= UFC Fight Night: Holohan vs. Smolka =

UFC mixed martial arts event in 2015

- The poster for UFC Fight Night: Holohan vs. Smolka
- Promotion: Ultimate Fighting Championship
- Date: 24 October 2015
- Venue: 3Arena
- City: Dublin, Ireland
- Attendance: 9,500

Event chronology
UFC 192: Cormier vs. Gustafsson	UFC Fight Night: Holohan vs. Smolka	UFC Fight Night: Belfort vs. Henderson 3

UFC Fight Night: Holohan vs. Smolka (also known as UFC Fight Night 76) was a mixed martial arts event held on 24 October 2015, at 3Arena in Dublin, Ireland. It featured Paddy Holohan and Louis Smolka as headliners. Smolka defeated Holohan via rear-naked choke.

== Background ==
The event was the third UFC event in Dublin, following UFC 93: Franklin vs. Henderson in January 2009 and UFC Fight Night: McGregor vs. Brandao in July 2014.

The event was expected to be headlined by a lightweight bout between Dustin Poirier and Joseph Duffy. However, Duffy was forced to pull out of the fight on 21 October, three days prior to the event, after sustaining a concussion during a sparring session earlier that week and the fight was scrapped. A flyweight bout between Paddy Holohan and Louis Smolka was promoted to serve as the event's new headliner. It was the first three-rounds main event bout since The Ultimate Fighter: Team Rousey vs. Team Tate Finale in November 2013.

The co-main event was expected to feature a heavyweight bout with potential UFC Heavyweight Championship title implications between Stipe Miocic and Ben Rothwell. However, Miocic pulled out of the fight on 14 October, ten days before the event, citing an injury. Rothwell was removed from the card the following day after the promotion deemed that a suitable opponent could not be arranged on short notice.

== Results ==
Main Card (UFC Fight Pass)
Weight class				Method	Round	Time	Notes
Flyweight	Louis Smolka	def.	Paddy Holohan	Submission (rear-naked choke)	2	4:09
Lightweight	Norman Parke	def.	Reza Madadi	Decision (unanimous) (30–27, 30–27, 30–27)	3	5:00
Welterweight	Darren Till	vs.	Nicolas Dalby	Draw (majority) (29–28, 28–28, 28–28)	3	5:00
Flyweight	Neil Seery	def.	Jon Delos Reyes	Submission (guillotine choke)	2	4:12
Preliminary Card (UFC Fight Pass)
Lightweight	Stevie Ray	def.	Mickael Lebout	Decision (unanimous) (29–28, 30–27, 30–27)	3	5:00
Women's Strawweight	Aisling Daly	def.	Ericka Almeida	Decision (unanimous) (30–27, 29–27, 29–28)	3	5:00
Middleweight	Krzysztof Jotko	def.	Scott Askham	Decision (split) (29–28, 28–29, 29–28)	3	5:00
Welterweight	Tom Breese	def.	Cathal Pendred	TKO (punches)	1	4:37
Featherweight	Darren Elkins	def.	Robert Whiteford	Decision (unanimous) (30–27, 30–27, 30–27)	3	5:00
Middleweight	Garreth McLellan	def.	Bubba Bush	TKO (punches)	3	4:58

== Bonus awards ==
The following fighters were awarded $50,000 bonuses:

- Fight of the Night: Darren Till vs. Nicolas Dalby
- Performance of the Night: Neil Seery and Tom Breese

== See also ==
- List of UFC events
- 2015 in UFC
