= UFC 189 =

UFC mixed martial arts event in 2015

UFC 189: Mendes vs. McGregor
- The poster for UFC 189: Mendes vs. McGregor
- Promotion: Ultimate Fighting Championship
- Date: July 11, 2015
- Venue: MGM Grand Garden Arena
- City: Las Vegas, Nevada
- Attendance: 16,019
- Total gate: $7,201,648
- Buyrate: 825,000

Event chronology
UFC Fight Night: Machida vs. Romero	UFC 189: Mendes vs. McGregor	The Ultimate Fighter: American Top Team vs. Blackzilians Finale

UFC 189: Mendes vs. McGregor was a mixed martial arts event held on July 11, 2015, at the MGM Grand Garden Arena in Las Vegas, Nevada.

== Background ==
The event took place during the UFC's annual International Fight Week.

The event was expected to be headlined by a UFC Featherweight Championship bout between the then champion José Aldo and Conor McGregor. On June 23, it was reported that Aldo suffered a rib fracture and pulled out of the bout in light of the injury. On June 30, it was confirmed that Aldo indeed pulled out of the bout and that the interim championship bout would take place at this event. The bout remained the event headliner. On July 1, photographs of Aldo's scans were released and indicated that he had indeed suffered a fractured rib. On July 10, White claimed that Aldo did not have a broken rib as "every x-ray he sent out was of an old injury". He reaffirmed that Aldo had a "bruised rib and cartilage" and that the biggest problem was the weight cutting process being complicated by the injury. They later fought at UFC 194.

The co-main event featured a UFC Welterweight Championship bout between then champion Robbie Lawler and top contender Rory MacDonald. Their first fight at UFC 167 ended in a split decision victory for Lawler.

Matt Brown was briefly linked to a bout with Nate Diaz at the event. However, in mid-April, Brown announced that the pairing had been scrapped. Brown remained on the card against Tim Means.

A welterweight bout between Jake Ellenberger and Stephen Thompson was initially expected to take place at this event. However, in mid-May, the bout was made the main event of The Ultimate Fighter: American Top Team vs. Blackzilians Finale which took place a day later at the same venue.

John Hathaway was expected to face Gunnar Nelson at the event. However, on June 23, Hathaway pulled out of the bout due to an injury. This prompted a shift in another welterweight bout on the card as Brandon Thatch was pulled from his fight against John Howard to face Nelson, while Cathal Pendred was announced as Howard's new opponent. Pendred had previously fought only 28 days before the event, when he defeated Augusto Montaño at UFC 188.

Jeremy Stephens missed weight on his first attempt, coming in 3.5 lb overweight at 149.5 lb. After having made no attempts to cut further, he was fined 20 percent of his fight purse, which went to Dennis Bermudez.

== Results ==
Main Card
Weight class				Method	Round	Time	Notes
Featherweight	Conor McGregor	def.	Chad Mendes	TKO (punches)	2	4:57	(Note: For the interim UFC Featherweight Championship.)
Welterweight	Robbie Lawler (c)	def.	Rory MacDonald	TKO (punches)	5	1:00	(Note: For the UFC Welterweight Championship.)
Catchweight (149.5 lb)	Jeremy Stephens	def.	Dennis Bermudez	TKO (flying knee and punches)	3	0:32
Welterweight	Gunnar Nelson	def.	Brandon Thatch	Submission (rear-naked choke)	1	2:54
Bantamweight	Thomas Almeida	def.	Brad Pickett	KO (flying knee)	2	0:29
Preliminary Card (Fox Sports 1)
Welterweight	Matt Brown	def.	Tim Means	Submission (guillotine choke)	1	4:44
Welterweight	Alex Garcia	def.	Mike Swick	Decision (unanimous) (29–28, 30–27, 30–27)	3	5:00
Welterweight	John Howard	def.	Cathal Pendred	Decision (split) (29–28, 28–29, 29–28)	3	5:00
Bantamweight	Cody Garbrandt	def.	Henry Briones	Decision (unanimous) (30–27, 30–27, 30–27)	3	5:00
Preliminary Card (UFC Fight Pass)
Flyweight	Louis Smolka	def.	Neil Seery	Decision (unanimous) (30–27, 30–27, 30–27)	3	5:00
Lightweight	Cody Pfister	def.	Yosdenis Cedeno	Decision (unanimous) (29–28, 29–28, 29–28)	3	5:00

== Bonus awards ==
The following fighters were awarded $50,000 bonuses:

- Fight of the Night: Robbie Lawler vs. Rory MacDonald
- Performance of the Night: Conor McGregor and Thomas Almeida

== Reported payout ==
The following is the reported payout to the fighters as reported to the Nevada State Athletic Commission. It does not include sponsor money and also does not include the UFC's traditional "fight night" bonuses.

- Conor McGregor: $500,000 (no win bonus) def. Chad Mendes: $500,000
- Robbie Lawler: $300,000 (includes $150,000 win bonus) def. Rory MacDonald: $59,000
- Jeremy Stephens: $72,000 (includes $40,000 win bonus) def. Dennis Bermudez: $34,000 ^
- Gunnar Nelson: $58,000 (includes $29,000 win bonus) def. Brandon Thatch: $22,000
- Thomas Almeida: $24,000 (includes $12,000 win bonus) def. Brad Pickett: $30,000
- Matt Brown: $92,000 (includes $46,000 win bonus) def. Tim Means: $23,000
- Alex Garcia: $30,000 (includes $15,000 win bonus) def. Mike Swick: $48,000
- John Howard: $42,000 (includes $21,000 win bonus) def. Cathal Pendred: $10,000
- Cody Garbrandt: $20,000 (includes $10,000 win bonus) def. Henry Briones: $10,000
- Louis Smolka: $30,000 (includes $15,000 win bonus) def. Neil Seery: $10,000
- Cody Pfister: $20,000 (includes $10,000 win bonus) def. Yosdenis Cedeno: $13,000

^ Jeremy Stephens was fined 20 percent of his purse ($8,000) for failing to make the required weight for his fight with Dennis Bermudez. That money was issued to Bermudez, an NSAC official confirmed.

== Records set ==
The event's weigh-ins took place before a record crowd estimated at 11,500.

The event had a $7,200,000 gate, which broke the record for a mixed martial arts event in the United States. The final attendance for the event was 16,019, a record for Nevada, which had hosted 91 prior UFC events.

== Lawler vs. MacDonald II ==
The rematch between Robbie Lawler and Rory MacDonald for the welterweight championship was named 2015's Fight of the Year by Sherdog and MMA Fighting. The fight was exceptionally brutal - Lawler's lip was deeply lacerated by the end of the fight and MacDonald's nose bled profusely after being broken by the end of the first round, leading him to fight with what has been described as a "crimson mask" of blood. At the end of the fourth round, both fighters stared each other down in the middle of the octagon before being ushered back into their corners. After being nearly finished at the end of the third round, Lawler landed a clean punch on MacDonald's already-broken nose in the fifth round, causing MacDonald to collapse in pain and winning by TKO. Going into the fifth, MacDonald was ahead on all three judge's scorecards, meaning that Lawler likely needed to win by finish.

The fight was awarded Fight of the Night honors, and met with immediate acclaim. MMA journalist Dave Doyle proclaimed it "an instant classic," and speculated that the fight was MMA's equivalent of Arturo Gatti vs. Mickey Ward. Within two years, a fan poll conducted by ESPN voted it the best fight in UFC history, narrowly edging out Jones vs. Gustafsson. Numerous sources regard it as the greatest fight in the history of the promotion, and it was inducted into the UFC Hall of Fame's Fight wing in 2023.

== Milestones ==
This was the first event to feature the UFC's Reebok fight kits, which were announced on December 2, 2014 and officially revealed on June 30, 2015.

For the main event, the entrance music was performed live. Sinéad O'Connor sang "Foggy Dew" for McGregor and Aaron Lewis and his band played "Country Boy" for Mendes.

== See also ==
- List of UFC events
- 2015 in UFC
