= 2013 in Cage Warriors =

Mixed martial arts events

Information
- First date: March 9, 2013
- Last date: December 31, 2013

Events
- Total events: 14

Fights
- Total fights: 91

Chronology
2012 in Cage Warriors	2013 in Cage Warriors	2014 in Cage Warriors

The year 2013 is the 12th year in the history of Cage Warriors, a mixed martial arts promotion based in the United Kingdom. In 2013 Cage Warriors held 14 events beginning with, Cage Warriors: 52.

== Events list ==
#	Event Title	Date	Arena	Location
59	Cage Warriors 52	March 9, 2013	The Forum	London, England
60	Cage Warriors 53	April 13, 2013	Kelvin Hall	Glasgow, Scotland
61	Cage Warriors 54	May 4, 2013	Motorpoint Arena	Cardiff, Wales
62	Cage Warriors Fight Night 8	May 11, 2013	Mirbeh Sports Hall	Al Fujairah, UAE
63	Cage Warriors 55	June 1, 2013	The Helix	Dublin, Ireland
64	Cage Warriors 56	July 6, 2013	The Forum	London, England
65	Cage Warriors 57	July 20, 2013	Echo Arena	Liverpool, England
66	Cage Warriors 58	August 24, 2013	Olympisk Arena	Grozny, Chechnya
67	Cage Warriors 59	September 14, 2013	Motorpoint Arena	Cardiff, Wales
68	Cage Warriors 60	October 5, 2013	The Forum	London, England
69	Cage Warriors Fight Night 9	October 25, 2013	King Hussein Boxing Arena	Amman, Jordan
70	Cage Warriors 61	December 7, 2013	Metro Radio Arena	Newcastle, England
71	Cage Warriors 62	December 13, 2013	King Hussein Boxing Arena	Amman, Jordan
72	Cage Warriors 63	December 31, 2013	The Helix	Dublin, Ireland

== Cage Warriors: 52 ==
Cage Warriors: 52 was an event held on March 9, 2013 in London, England.

=== Results ===
Main Card
Weight class				Method	Round	Time	Notes
Welterweight	Cathal Pendred	def.	Gael Grimaud	Decision (Unanimous)	5	5:00
