= Phil Harris (fighter) =

English martial artist

- Born: 9 April 1983 (age 43); Portsmouth, England
- Other names: Billy
- Nationality: England
- Height: 5 ft 4 in (1.63 m)
- Weight: 125 lb (57 kg; 8.9 st)
- Division: Flyweight; Featherweight (formerly)
- Reach: 64.0 in (163 cm)
- Fighting out of: Portsmouth, England
- Team: Gym 01 / South Coast Submissions
- Rank: Black belt in Judo
- Years active: 2003-2014

Mixed martial arts record
- Total: 36
- Wins: 22
- By knockout: 4
- By submission: 13
- By decision: 5
- Losses: 12
- By knockout: 5
- By submission: 5
- By decision: 2
- No contests: 2

Other information
- Mixed martial arts record from Sherdog

Phil Harris (born 9 April 1983) is a retired English mixed martial artist. A professional competitor from 2003 until 2014, he competed for the UFC, Cage Warriors,Cage Rage, and BAMMA.

== Mixed martial arts career ==
=== Early career ===
After compiling a record of 17–9 (1), Harris signed with BAMMA in 2010, winning his debut match against Irish featherweight Steve McCombe at BAMMA 2 via unanimous decision. He followed that up with another decision victory over Neil Seery at BAMMA 3. After a 21-month layoff, Harris dropped two weight classes to take on Canadian grappler Remi Morvan at Cage Warriors 46, winning by triangle armbar at 4:21 of round 1, his first submission win since 2007. Less than a month later, he took on TUF 14 contestant Casey Dyer at Cage Warriors: Fight Night 4, notching his fifth consecutive win with a unanimous decision.

=== Ultimate Fighting Championship ===
On 16 August 2012, Harris was signed by the Ultimate Fighting Championship. He made his UFC debut against fellow grappler Darren Uyenoyama at UFC on FX 5 on 5 October 2012, replacing an injured Louis Gaudinot. Harris was submitted in the second round with a rear naked choke.

Harris next faced Ulysses Gomez on 16 February 2013 at UFC on Fuel TV: Barão vs. McDonald. Harris won via unanimous decision.

Harris was expected to face John Lineker on 3 August 2013 at UFC 163, but Harris suffered a fractured orbital bone in training and was replaced by José Maria.

The bout with Lineker was rescheduled for 26 October 2013 at UFC Fight Night 30. Harris lost by first-round TKO.

Harris faced Louis Gaudinot at UFC Fight Night 37. He lost via submission in the first round. However, on 20 June 2014, the loss was changed to a No Contest after it was revealed Gaudinot had failed his drug test.

On 5 April 2014, Harris was released from the UFC after losing two fights in a row.

On the same day that Harris was released from the UFC, 5 April 2014, it was announced that Harris had signed an exclusive five-fight deal with Cage Warriors. Harris was expected to face Kurban Gadzhiev on 18 April 2014 in the main event of Cage Warriors Fight Night 11. However Kurban Gadzhiev pulled out of the fight due to illness, thus scrapping the fight.

Harris faced Neil Seery in a rematch on 19 July 2014 at UFC Fight Night 46. He lost via unanimous decision.

On 31 December 2014, Harris announced his retirement from mixed martial arts.

== Mixed martial arts record ==
Professional record breakdown
36 matches	22 wins	12 losses
By knockout	4	5
By submission	13	5
By decision	5	2
No contests	2	

Res.	Record	Opponent	Method	Event	Date	Round	Time	Location	Notes
Loss	22–12 (2)	Neil Seery	Decision (unanimous)	UFC Fight Night: McGregor vs. Brandao	19 July 2014	3	5:00	Dublin, Ireland	
NC	22–11 (2)	Louis Gaudinot	NC (overturned loss)	UFC Fight Night: Gustafsson vs. Manuwa	8 March 2014	1	1:13	London, England	Originally a submission (guillotine choke) loss; overturned due to failed drug test
Loss	22–11 (1)	John Lineker	TKO (punches)	UFC Fight Night: Machida vs. Munoz	26 October 2013	1	2:51	Manchester, England	128 lbs catchweight bout; Lineker missed weight
Win	22–10 (1)	Ulysses Gomez	Decision (unanimous)	UFC on Fuel TV: Barão vs. McDonald	16 February 2013	3	5:00	London, England	
Loss	21–10 (1)	Darren Uyenoyama	Submission (rear naked choke)	UFC on FX: Browne vs. Bigfoot	5 October 2012	2	3:38	Minneapolis, Minnesota, United States	
Win	21–9 (1)	Casey Dyer	Decision (unanimous)	Cage Warriors Fight Night 4	16 March 2012	3	5:00	Dubai, United Arab Emirates	
Win	20–9 (1)	Remi Morvan	Submission (triangle armbar)	Cage Warriors: 46	23 February 2012	1	4:22	Kyiv, Ukraine	Flyweight debut.
Win	19–9 (1)	Neil Seery	Decision (unanimous)	BAMMA 3	15 May 2010	3	5:00	Birmingham, England	
Win	18–9 (1)	Steve McCombe	Decision (unanimous)	BAMMA 2	13 February 2010	3	5:00	London, England	
Win	17–9 (1)	Mourad Benshegir	Decision	Atlas Fighting Challenge	9 August 2008	3	5:00	Birmingham, England	
Loss	16–9 (1)	Ashleigh Grimshaw	TKO (punches)	FX3: England vs. Germany	24 November 2007	1	0:46	Reading, England	
Loss	16–8 (1)	Michael Leonard	Submission (triangle choke)	Cage Rage Contenders: Dynamite	29 September 2007	1	1:25	Dublin, Ireland	
NC	16–7 (1)	Michal Hamrsmid	No Contest	Cage Fight Series: D-Day	12 May 2007	1	N/A	England	Harris cut by faulty cage.
Win	16–7	Scott Jansen	Submission (rear-naked choke)	UK-1 Fight Night	14 April 2007	N/A	N/A	England	
Win	15–7	Nayeb Hezam	Submission (achilles lock)	Fight First MMA	23 March 2007	1	1:32	London, England	
Win	14–7	Darren Russell	Submission (armbar)	UK Mixed Martial Arts Championship 18	25 February 2007	1	2:25	Essex, England	
Loss	13–7	Micky Young	TKO (corner stoppage)	Ultimate Fighting Revolution 7	29 October 2006	1	N/A	Belfast, Northern Ireland	
Loss	13–6	David Smyth	KO	Pride & Glory: Drop Zone 4	9 September 2006	1	0:37	Catterick, England	
Win	13–5	Kamon Rana	TKO (punches)	Full Contact Fight Night 3	15 July 2006	1	N/A	Bracknell, England	
Win	12–5	Valdo Menzes	TKO (punches)	Absolute Adrenaline: Game Over	4 June 2006	2	N/A	Bournemouth, England	
Win	11–5	Phil Labar	Submission (rear-naked choke)	UK-1 Fight Night	25 February 2006	1	N/A	Portsmouth, England	
Loss	10–5	Paul McVeigh	Submission (triangle choke)	CWFC: Strike Force 4	26 November 2005	3	1:05	Coventry, England	
Win	10–4	Valdo Menzes	TKO (punches)	FX 3: Battle of Britain	15 October 2005	2	1:52	Reading, England	
Loss	9–4	José Aldo	TKO (doctor stoppage)	UK-1 Fight Night	17 September 2005	1	N/A	Portsmouth, England	
Win	9–3	Christian Schoter	TKO (corner stoppage)	UK Storm	18 June 2005	1	5:00	Birmingham, England	Schoter didn't answer bell for second round.
Win	8–3	Ricky Moore	Submission (rear-naked choke)	Anarchy Fight Night	20 February 2005	1	4:09	Birmingham, England	
Win	7–3	Alex Pullin	Submission (choke)	Angrrr Management 1	4 December 2004	1	N/A	Somerset, England	
Win	6–3	Chris Freeborn	Submission (armbar)	Full Contact Fight Night 3	13 November 2004	N/A	N/A	Portsmouth, England	
Win	5–3	Chris Westwood	Submission (armbar)	UK Storm	4 September 2004	1	1:25	Evesham, England	
Loss	4–3	Luiz Henrique Tosta	Technical Submission (armbar)	UK Mixed Martial Arts Championship 8	22 August 2004	1	4:52	Essex, England	
Loss	4–2	Alex Owen	Submission (triangle choke)	Night of Fury	1 August 2004	2	3:30	Merthyr Tydfil, Wales	
Win	4–1	Dave Campbell	Submission (armbar)	UK Mixed Martial Arts Championship 7	30 May 2004	3	4:13	Essex, England	
Loss	3–1	Mark Chen	Decision (unanimous)	UK Mixed Martial Arts Championship 6	29 February 2004	3	5:00	Essex, England	
Win	3–0	Frank Rivas	Submission (rear-naked choke)	Pride & Glory 1	1 February 2004	2	1:30	Cardiff, Wales	
Win	2–0	Steven Milward	Submission (rear-naked choke)	Ultimate Combat 8	30 November 2003	2	2:27	Chippenham, England	
Win	1–0	Eric Dumas	Submission (armbar)	UK Mixed Martial Arts Championship 5	2 November 2003	1	3:34	Essex, England	
