= Tom Breese =

English mixed martial artist

- Born: 26 September 1991 (age 35); Birmingham, England
- Height: 6 ft 3 in (1.91 m)
- Weight: 205 lb (93 kg; 14 st 9 lb)
- Division: Light Heavyweight; Middleweight; Welterweight
- Reach: 73 in (185 cm)
- Fighting out of: Birmingham, England
- Team: Fearless MMA (until 2016); Team Renegade BJJ & MMA (2016–present); Tristar Gym (2013–2016)
- Rank: Black belt in Brazilian Jiu Jitsu under Chiu Kwong Man
- Years active: 2010–present

Mixed martial arts record
- Total: 29
- Wins: 21
- By knockout: 5
- By submission: 14
- By decision: 2
- Losses: 8
- By knockout: 5
- By submission: 2
- By decision: 1

Other information
- Mixed martial arts record from Sherdog

Tom Breese (born 26 September 1991) is an English mixed martial artist who competes in the Middleweight and Light Heavyweight division. A professional competitor since 2010, he formerly competed for the Ultimate Fighting Championship, Professional Fighters League (PFL), Konfrontacja Sztuk Walki (KSW), and BAMMA.

== Background ==
Born in Birmingham to a Welsh father and an English mother, Breese began training MMA at the age of 16. After high school, Breese attended university only to drop out later in order to pursue a career in mixed martial arts. A successful wrestler and jiu-jitsu competitor, he won a junior national freestyle wrestling championship, as well as a second-place finish at the IBJJF world championships when he was a purple belt.

== Mixed martial arts career ==
=== Early career ===
Breese compiled an amateur record of 3–0–1 before successfully making his professional debut for BAMMA in 2010.

Breese fought exclusively in his native England and amassed an undefeated record of 7–0 with all but one win coming by way of submission before joining the Ultimate Fighting Championship in 2015.

=== Ultimate Fighting Championship ===
Breese made his promotional debut against Luiz Dutra Jr. on 30 May 2015 at UFC Fight Night 67. Breese won the fight via TKO in the first round after dropping his opponent with a straight left and following up with ground and pound.

Breese faced Cathal Pendred on 24 October 2015 at UFC Fight Night 76. Breese dominated the fight with striking exchanges en route to another TKO victory in the first round. In similar fashion to his UFC debut, Breese dropped his opponent with a straight left and followed up with ground and pound to earn the TKO victory. The win also earned him his first Performance of the Night bonus award.

Breese faced Keita Nakamura on 27 February 2016 at UFC Fight Night 84. He won the fight via unanimous decision.

Breese faced Sean Strickland on 4 June 2016 at UFC 199. He lost the fight via split decision, marking the first loss in Breese's career.

Breese was expected to face Oluwale Bamgbose on 18 March 2017 at UFC Fight Night 107. However, on the day of the event, Breese was deemed unfit to compete and the bout was cancelled.

Breese faced Dan Kelly on 27 May 2018 at UFC Fight Night 130. He won the fight via technical knockout in round one. This win earned him the Performance of the Night award.

Breese was expected to face Cezar Ferreira on 17 November 2018 at UFC Fight Night 140. However, it was reported on 9 November 2018 that Breese pulled out of the event due to injury and was replaced by Ian Heinisch.

Breese was expected to face Alessio Di Chirico on 16 March 2019 at UFC Fight Night 147. However, Di Chirico pulled out of the fight in early January citing an undisclosed injury and subsequent surgery. He was replaced by Cezar Ferreira. However, on 1 February 2019 Ferreira withdrew from the fight, citing a knee injury, and was replaced by Ian Heinisch. In turn, Breese withdrew from the fight against Heinisch due to health concerns.

Breese faced Brendan Allen on 29 February 2020 at UFC Fight Night 169. He lost the fight via TKO in the first round.

Breese was scheduled to meet Roman Kopylov on 4 October 2020. at UFC on ESPN: Holm vs. Aldana. However, Kopylov was removed from the bout for undisclosed reason and he was replaced by KB Bhullar. The fight took place a week later at UFC Fight Night: Moraes vs. Sandhagen. Breese won the fight via technical knockout in round one. This win earned him the Performance of the Night award.

Breese was expected to face Omari Akhmedov on 16 January 2021 at UFC on ABC 1. During fight week, the UFC opted to move the bout to UFC on ESPN: Chiesa vs. Magny. He lost the bout via second round arm triangle submission.

Breese was scheduled to face Antônio Arroyo on 5 June 2021 at UFC Fight Night: Rozenstruik vs. Sakai. However, the fight would be cancelled a few hours before it was to take place due to medical issues suffered by Breese.

=== Levels Fight League ===
After the pull out from his last bout, Breese was released from the UFC and signed a multi-fight deal with Levels Fight League. Breese made his debut against David Ramirez at LFL 4 on 13 March 2022. He won the fight by submission due to rear naked choke at 1:46 of the second round, winning the LFL Middleweight title in the process.

Breese defended his title against Ahmed Sami at Levels Fight League 5 on 26 June 2022. He won the bout and kept the title, submitting Sami in the second round via guillotine choke.

=== Konfrontacja Sztuk Walki ===
Breese made his KSW debut against Damian Janikowski on 10 September 2022, at KSW 74, controversially winning via guillotine choke in the second round, with the bout being stopped after the ref thought that Janikowski tapped when he said he didn't.

In his sophomore performance, Breese faced Paweł Pawlak on 12 November 2022, at KSW 76: Parnasse vs. Rajewski, losing the bout via ground and pound TKO in the first round.

Breese faced Bartosz Leśko on 17 March 2023, at KSW 80: Ruchała vs. Eskiev, submitting him via rear-naked choke in the first round.

=== Return to LFL and double championship ===
After the stint in KSW, Breese returned to the Levels Fight League, challenging the reigning LFL Light Heavyweight champion Jarosław Lech at LFL 9 on 9 July 2023. Breese became an LFL double champion by submitting Lech in the first round.

On 10 October 2023 KSW announced that Breese was no longer under contract with the promotion.

=== Professional Fighters League ===
After leaving KSW, Breese signed with the PFL and made his debut against Cleiton Silva on 8 December 2023 at PFL Europe 4. He won the fight via a rear-naked choke submission in the first round.

Breese started the 2024 season with a bout against Rob Wilkinson on 12 April 2024 at PFL 2. He lost the fight by first-round technical knockout with a knee and punches.

Breese was scheduled to face Sadibou Sy on 21 June 2024 at PFL 5, however he pulled out for unknown reasons.

== Championships and achievements ==
- Ultimate Fighting Championship
  - Performance of the Night (Three times) vs. Cathal Pendred, Dan Kelly and KB Bhullar
  - UFC.com Awards
    - 2015: Ranked #2 Newcomer of the Year
- BAMMA
  - BAMMA RDX Welterweight Championship (One time)
- Levels Fight League
  - LFL Middleweight Championship (One time; current)
    - One successful title defense
  - LFL Light Heavyweight Championship (one time; current)
- Konfrontacja Sztuk Walki
  - Submission of the Night (one time) vs. Bartosz Leśko

== Mixed martial arts record ==
Professional record breakdown
29 matches	21 wins	8 losses
By knockout	5	5
By submission	14	2
By decision	2	1

Res.	Record	Opponent	Method	Event	Date	Round	Time	Location	Notes
Win	21–8	Marcin Prachnio	Submission (rear-naked choke)	FNC 32	June 20, 2026	1	1:06	Osijek, Croatia	
Loss	20–8	Caio Machado	TKO (punches and elbows)	UAE Warriors 67	January 31, 2026	2	2:58	Abu Dhabi, United Arab Emirates	
Loss	20–7	Emiliano Sordi	Submission (rear-naked choke)	FNC 25	November 29, 2025	1	2:15	Varaždin, Croatia	
Win	20–6	Jakob Nedoh	Submission (heel hook)	FNC 22	April 12, 2025	1	1:18	Ljubljana, Slovenia	
Loss	19–6	Cezary Oleksiejczuk	TKO (punches)	FNC 21	February 15, 2025	1	1:36	Zadar, Croatia	Middleweight bout; Breese missed weight (190.5 lb).
Win	19–5	Renato Rangel	Decision (unanimous)	Levels Fight League 14	October 27, 2024	3	5:00	Amsterdam, Netherlands	
Loss	18–5	Rob Wilkinson	TKO (knee and punches)	PFL 2 (2024)	12 April 2024	1	1:10	Las Vegas, Nevada, United States	
Win	18–4	Cleiton Silva	Submission (rear-naked choke)	PFL Europe 4 (2023)	8 December 2023	1	3:30	Dublin, Ireland	2024 PFL Global League Qualifier.
Win	17–4	Jarosław Lech	Submission (triangle choke)	Levels Fight League 9	9 July 2023	1	2:42	Amsterdam, Netherlands	Light Heavyweight debut. Won the LFL Light Heavyweight Championship.
Win	16–4	Bartosz Leśko	Submission (rear-naked choke)	KSW 80	17 March 2023	1	2:45	Lubin, Poland	Submission of the Night.
Loss	15–4	Paweł Pawlak	TKO (elbow and punches)	KSW 76	12 November 2022	1	3:54	Grodzisk Mazowiecki, Poland	
Win	15–3	Damian Janikowski	Submission (guillotine choke)	KSW 74	10 September 2022	2	1:53	Ostrów Wielkopolski, Poland	
Win	14–3	Ahmed Sami	Submission (guillotine choke)	Levels Fight League 5	26 June 2022	2	1:52	Amsterdam, Netherlands	Defended the LFL Middleweight Championship.
Win	13–3	David Ramires	Submission (rear-naked choke)	Levels Fight League 4	13 March 2022	2	1:46	Amsterdam, Netherlands	Won the vacant LFL Middleweight Championship.
Loss	12–3	Omari Akhmedov	Submission (arm-triangle choke)	UFC on ESPN: Chiesa vs. Magny	20 January 2021	2	1:41	Abu Dhabi, United Arab Emirates	
Win	12–2	KB Bhullar	TKO (punches)	UFC Fight Night: Moraes vs. Sandhagen	11 October 2020	1	1:43	Abu Dhabi, United Arab Emirates	Performance of the Night.
Loss	11–2	Brendan Allen	TKO (elbows and punches)	UFC Fight Night: Benavidez vs. Figueiredo	29 February 2020	1	4:47	Norfolk, Virginia, United States	
Win	11–1	Dan Kelly	TKO (punches)	UFC Fight Night: Thompson vs. Till	27 May 2018	1	3:33	Liverpool, England	Middleweight debut. Performance of the Night.
Loss	10–1	Sean Strickland	Decision (split)	UFC 199	4 June 2016	3	5:00	Inglewood, California, United States	
Win	10–0	Keita Nakamura	Decision (unanimous)	UFC Fight Night: Silva vs. Bisping	27 February 2016	3	5:00	London, England	
Win	9–0	Cathal Pendred	TKO (punches)	UFC Fight Night: Holohan vs. Smolka	24 October 2015	1	4:37	Dublin, Ireland	Performance of the Night.
Win	8–0	Luiz Dutra Jr.	TKO (punches)	UFC Fight Night: Condit vs. Alves	30 May 2015	1	4:58	Goiânia, Brazil	
Win	7–0	Thibaud Larchet	Submission (rear-naked choke)	Cage Warriors 74	15 November 2014	3	4:57	London, England	
Win	6–0	Warren Kee	Submission (rear-naked choke)	BAMMA 11	1 December 2012	1	3:06	Birmingham, England	Won the inaugural BAMMA British Welterweight Championship.
Win	5–0	Jack Magee	Submission (triangle choke)	BAMMA 10	15 September 2012	1	3:19	London, England	
Win	4–0	Mark Tucker	TKO (knee to the body)	BAMMA 9	24 March 2012	2	1:40	Birmingham, England	
Win	3–0	Qasim Shafiq	Submission (triangle choke)	BAMMA 8	10 December 2011	1	4:20	Nottingham, England	
Win	2–0	Lee Taylor	Submission (rear-naked choke)	BAMMA 7	10 September 2011	1	2:26	Birmingham, England	
Win	1–0	Shahid Hussain	Submission (rear-naked choke)	BAMMA 4	25 September 2010	2	2:57	Birmingham, England	

== See also ==
- List of male mixed martial artists
