= Norman Parke =

Northern Irish mixed martial artist

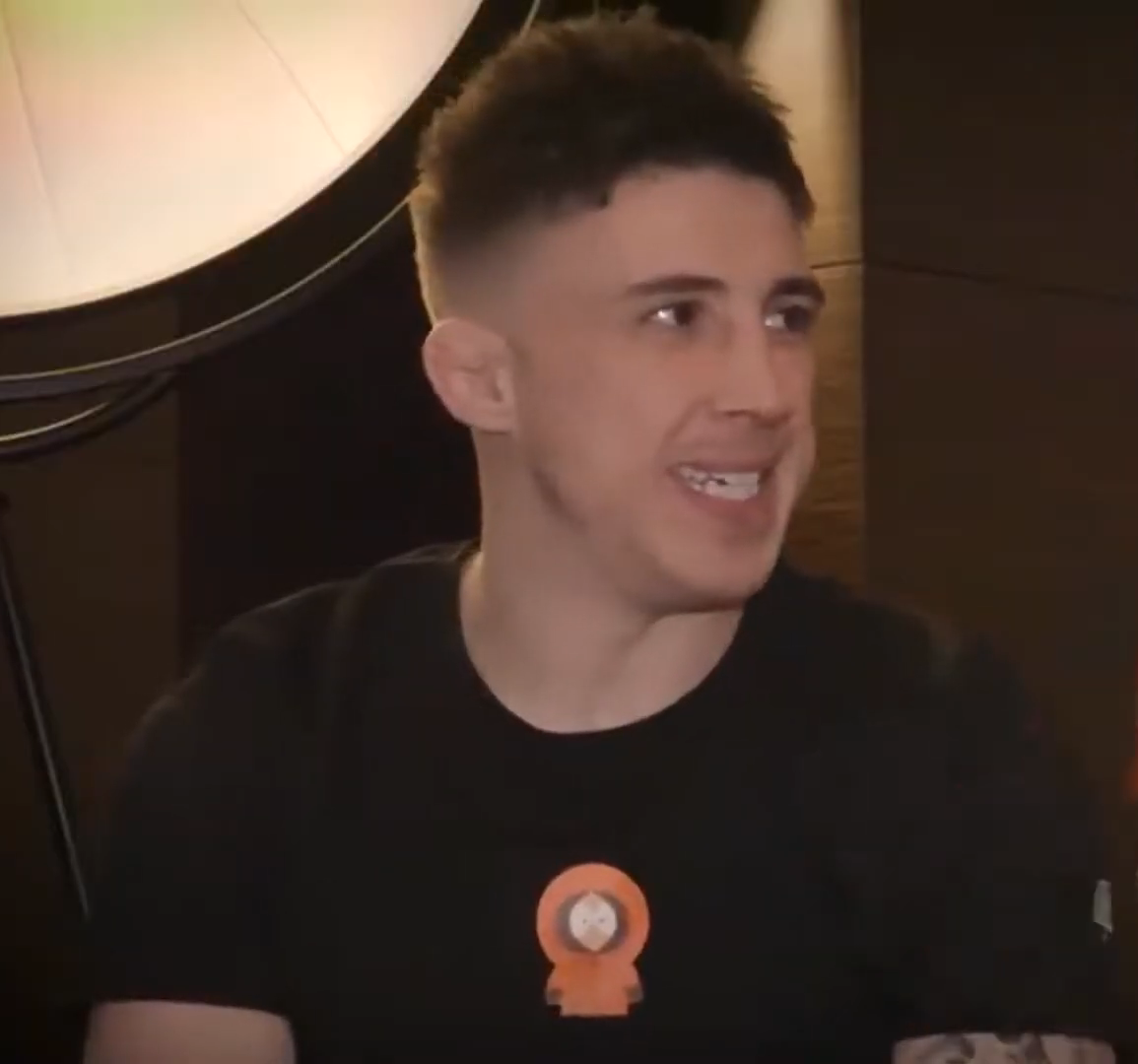
- Born: 22 December 1986 (age 39); Bushmills, County Antrim, Northern Ireland
- Other names: Stormin
- Nationality: British and Irish
- Height: 5 ft 11 in (1.80 m)
- Weight: 156.1 lb (71 kg; 11 st 2 lb)
- Division: Lightweight
- Reach: 70.0 in (178 cm)
- Fighting out of: Bushmills, County Antrim, Northern Ireland
- Team: Next Generation
- Rank: Black belt in Judo
- Wrestling: Northern Ireland National Champion in Freestyle Wrestling
- Years active: 2006–present

Mixed martial arts record
- Total: 41
- Wins: 32
- By knockout: 5
- By submission: 12
- By decision: 15
- Losses: 7
- By knockout: 1
- By submission: 2
- By decision: 4
- Draws: 1
- No contests: 1

Other information
- Mixed martial arts record from Sherdog

Norman Parke (born 22 December 1986) is a mixed martial artist from Northern Ireland. A professional MMA competitor since 2006, Parke has fought for the UFC, Absolute Championship Berkut, KSW, and BAMMA. He was also a competitor for Team UK on The Ultimate Fighter: The Smashes in late 2012 and won the Lightweight Tournament.

== Background ==
Born and raised in Bushmills, Northern Ireland, Parke began training in Judo at the age of 16. He went on to be a National Champion in Judo as well as Freestyle Wrestling in 2009–2010 and 2011–2012. Later, after he also began training in boxing, Parke transitioned into mixed martial arts at the age of 20.

== Mixed martial arts career ==
=== Early career ===
Before signing with the UFC, Parke compiled a record of 16–2, with 12 of his victories coming via submission. Parke's losses were against the veteran Greg Loughran and the then-undefeated Joseph Duffy.

Parke was introduced to the masses and given his first televised fight by Cage Contender on 24 July 2010, going on to fight for the promotion more times than anywhere else. In his last fight under the Cage Contender banner, Parke claimed the vacant Cage Contender Lightweight Championship.

After going 14–2, Parke signed to face Anton Kuivanen at Fight Festival 29, in what would have been his first fight outside Ireland and the United Kingdom. However, the fight did not materialise and Kuivanen fought another fighter on the card. After a further victory domestically, Parke signed with Cage Warriors to face Brad Wheeler in February 2012. However, Parke withdrew after a hand injury. Parke returned in May 2012, where he defeated Stephen Coll via TKO, in what turned out to be his final appearance before joining The Ultimate Fighter.

=== The Ultimate Fighter ===
In late 2012, Parke signed to be a competitor on The Ultimate Fighter: The Smashes - a regional version of the Ultimate Fighter series, which pitted Australian fighters against British fighters. Parke competed in the lightweight division and his first opponent in the show was Richie Vaculik, who currently competes at flyweight. Parke was able to hit Vaculik on the ground with elbows; one of which cut Vaculik on the top of his head. Parke was able to take Vaculik down again in the second round and controlled the fight from half-guard. Parke defeated Vaculik via unanimous decision to move onto the semi-final round.

In the semi-final round, Parke was matched up against fellow Team UK fighter Brendan Loughnane. Parke won the fight via unanimous decision and moved onto the finals which took place live on UFC on FX: Sotiropoulos vs. Pearson.

=== Ultimate Fighting Championship ===
Parke made his UFC debut on 15 December 2012 at UFC on FX 6 which was also known as "The Ultimate Fighter: The Smashes Finale". Parke would fight Colin Fletcher to determine the lightweight winner of The Ultimate Fighter: The Smashes. Parke controlled the entirety of the fight and won the fight via unanimous decision.

Parke was expected to face Jon Tuck on 20 April 2013 at UFC on Fox 7. However, the bout was scrapped during the week leading up to the event as Tuck was forced out of the bout with an injury.

Parke fought Kazuki Tokudome on 6 July 2013 at UFC 162. He won the fight by unanimous decision.

A rescheduled bout with Jon Tuck eventually took place on 26 October 2013 at UFC Fight Night 30. Parke won the fight via unanimous decision.

Parke faced TUF: Brazil 2 winner Leonardo Santos at UFC Fight Night 38. Due to a point deduction for Parke grabbing Santos' shorts, the bout ended in a majority draw.

Parke faced returning veteran Naoyuki Kotani on 19 July 2014 at UFC Fight Night 46 in Dublin. He won the fight via TKO in the second round.

Parke was expected to face Diego Sanchez on 15 November 2014 at UFC 180. However, Parke pulled out of the bout in early October citing a knee injury and was replaced by Joe Lauzon.

Parke was expected to face Jorge Masvidal on 18 January 2015 at UFC Fight Night 59. However, in early December, Masvidal pulled out of the bout citing an injury and was replaced by Gleison Tibau. Parke lost the fight via split decision.

Parke was expected to face Gilbert Burns on 30 May 2015 at UFC Fight Night 67. However, Burns pulled out of the fight in late April and was replaced by Francisco Trinaldo. Parke lost the fight via split decision.

Parke faced returning veteran Reza Madadi on 24 October 2015 at UFC Fight Night 76. He won the fight by unanimous decision.

Parke faced Rustam Khabilov on 27 February 2016 at UFC Fight Night 84. He lost the fight via unanimous decision.

Following the loss to Khabilov, Parke was released by the UFC.

=== Absolute Championship Berkut ===
Parke faced Andrew Fisher on 1 October 2016 at ACB 47: Braveheart. He won the fight via unanimous decision.

=== BAMMA ===
On 24 February 2017, Parke made his debut for the BAMMA organization. He faced Paul Redmond at BAMMA 28 for the vacant BAMMA Lightweight championship. Parke went on to win the fight by majority decision, but was not eligible to claim the championship due to a weight miss.

=== KSW ===
Parke signed with Polish promotion KSW and made his debut at KSW 39: Colosseum on 27 May 2017 for the KSW Lightweight Championship against champion Mateusz Gamrot. He lost the bout via unanimous decision.

Parke rematched Mateusz Gamrot at KSW 40: Dublin on 22 October 2017. After the bout was stopped due to eye pokes that left Parke unable to continue, Parke shoved Gamrot's cornerman, Borys Mankowski, which resulted in Marcin Bilman, another professional fighter who was in the champion's corner, responded by landing a punch on Parke. Gamrot was subsequently fined 30% of his purse and Bilman has been handed a two-year ban from KSW events.

After a few bouts in the KSW and Brave CF, it was announced on 14 July 2018 that Parke had signed a multi-fight contract with Bellator. Despite the contract with Bellator, Parke faced former KSW Welterweight Champion Borys Mankowski at KSW 47 on 23 March 2019 and won the bout via unanimous decision. Both fighters were awarded the Fight of the Night bonus award.

After defeating the former KSW Featherweight Champion Artur Sowiński via unanimous decision at KSW 49: Soldić vs. Kaszubowski, Parke was expected to face Marian Ziółkowski for the interim KSW Lightweight Championship at KSW 50 on 14 September 2019. However, Ziółkowski was forced to withdraw from the bout due to an injury and was replaced by former KSW Featherweight Champion Marcin Wrzosek. Parke won the fight by split decision.

Parke faced Mateusz Gamrot in a trilogy bout at KSW 53 on 11 July 2020. The bout was expected to be the Lightweight Championship unification bout, but Parke was unable to make weight thus the title is not on the line. Parke lost the fight via doctor stoppage in the third round.

=== Regional circuit ===
On 28 February, during the Second Press Conference before Fame 9, a boxing fight between Norman Parke and a former amateur boxer, Polish championship medalist Kasjusz "Don Kasjo" Życiński was announced.

On 26 March 2022 Parke faced rapper Popek at Fame 13. He won after Popek broke his hand less than a minute into the bout and was unable to continue.

Parke faced Grzegorz Szulakowski on 9 July 2022 at Prime Show MMA 2, winning the bout via unanimous decision.

Parke was scheduled to fight Adam Okniński at Prime Show MMA 4 on 26 November 2022, but withdrew from the bout after a contract dispute with the organization.

As the sole bout of his contract with Hexagone, Parke faced Alfredo Souza on 11 March 2023 at Hexagone MMA 7, winning the bout via unanimous decision.

Coming in as a late replacement, Parke faced Michał Pasternak at Fame 20 on 11 February 2024, winning the bout via unanimous decision.

== Championships and accomplishments ==
- Konfrontacja Sztuk Walki
  - Interim KSW Lightweight Championship (One time; former)
  - Fight of the Night (Two times) vs. Borys Mańkowski and Marcin Wrzosek
- Ultimate Fighting Championship
  - The Ultimate Fighter: The Smashes Lightweight Winner
- Cage Contender
  - Cage Contender Lightweight Champion (One time)

== Mixed martial arts record ==
Professional record breakdown
41 matches	32 wins	7 losses
By knockout	5	1
By submission	12	2
By decision	15	4
Draws	1	
No contests	1	

Res.	Record	Opponent	Method	Event	Date	Round	Time	Location	Notes
Win	32–7–1 (1)	Michał Pasternak	Decision (unanimous)	Fame 20	10 February 2024	3	3:00	Kraków, Poland	Light Heavyweight debut.
Win	31–7–1 (1)	Alfredo Souza	Decision (unanimous)	Hexagone MMA 7	11 March 2023	3	5:00	Poitiers, France	Catchweight (181 lb) bout.
Win	30–7–1 (1)	Grzegorz Szulakowski	Decision (unanimous)	Prime Show MMA 2	July 9, 2022	3	5:00	Gdynia, Poland	
Win	29–7–1 (1)	Paweł Mikołajuw	TKO (hand injury)	Fame 13	26 March 2022	1	0:37	Gliwice, Poland	Openweight debut.
Loss	28–7–1 (1)	Mateusz Gamrot	TKO (doctor stoppage)	KSW 53	11 July 2020	3	3:02	Warsaw, Poland	Non-title bout; Parke missed weight (158.3 lb).
Win	28–6–1 (1)	Marcin Wrzosek	Decision (split)	KSW 50	14 September 2019	5	5:00	London, England	Return to Lightweight. Won the interim KSW Lightweight Championship. Fight of the Night.
Win	27–6–1 (1)	Artur Sowiński	Decision (unanimous)	KSW 49	18 May 2019	3	5:00	Gdańsk, Poland	Catchweight (163 lb) bout.
Win	26–6–1 (1)	Borys Mańkowski	Decision (unanimous)	KSW 47	23 March 2019	3	5:00	Łódź, Poland	Welterweight debut. Fight of the Night.
Win	25–6–1 (1)	Myles Price	Decision (unanimous)	Brave CF 13	9 June 2018	3	5:00	Belfast, Northern Ireland	
Win	24–6–1 (1)	Łukasz Chlewicki	Decision (unanimous)	KSW 43	14 April 2018	3	5:00	Wrocław, Poland	Catchweight (159.2 lb) bout; Parke missed weight.
NC	23–6–1 (1)	Mateusz Gamrot	NC (accidental eye poke)	KSW 40	22 October 2017	2	4:39	Dublin, Ireland	Non-title bout; Parke missed weight (156.1 lb). Accidental eye poke rendered Parke unable to continue.
Loss	23–6–1	Mateusz Gamrot	Decision (unanimous)	KSW 39	27 May 2017	3	5:00	Warsaw, Poland	For the KSW Lightweight Championship.
Win	23–5–1	Paul Redmond	Decision (majority)	BAMMA 28	24 February 2017	3	5:00	Belfast, Northern Ireland	For the vacant BAMMA Lightweight Championship. Parke missed weight (155.8 lb) and was ineligible for the title.
Win	22–5–1	Andrew Fisher	Decision (unanimous)	ACB 47	1 October 2016	3	5:00	Glasgow, Scotland	
Loss	21–5–1	Rustam Khabilov	Decision (unanimous)	UFC Fight Night: Silva vs. Bisping	27 February 2016	3	5:00	London, England	
Win	21–4–1	Reza Madadi	Decision (unanimous)	UFC Fight Night: Holohan vs. Smolka	24 October 2015	3	5:00	Dublin, Ireland	
Loss	20–4–1	Francisco Trinaldo	Decision (split)	UFC Fight Night: Condit vs. Alves	30 May 2015	3	5:00	Goiânia, Brazil	
Loss	20–3–1	Gleison Tibau	Decision (split)	UFC Fight Night: McGregor vs. Siver	18 January 2015	3	5:00	Boston, Massachusetts, United States	
Win	20–2–1	Naoyuki Kotani	TKO (punches)	UFC Fight Night: McGregor vs. Brandao	19 July 2014	2	3:41	Dublin, Ireland	
Draw	19–2–1	Leonardo Santos	Draw (majority)	UFC Fight Night: Shogun vs. Henderson 2	23 March 2014	3	5:00	Natal, Brazil	Parke was deducted one point in round 2 due to grabbing Santos' shorts.
Win	19–2	Jon Tuck	Decision (unanimous)	UFC Fight Night: Machida vs. Munoz	26 October 2013	3	5:00	Manchester, England	
Win	18–2	Kazuki Tokudome	Decision (unanimous)	UFC 162	6 July 2013	3	5:00	Las Vegas, Nevada, United States	
Win	17–2	Colin Fletcher	Decision (unanimous)	UFC on FX: Sotiropoulos vs. Pearson	15 December 2012	3	5:00	Gold Coast, Australia	Won The Ultimate Fighter: The Smashes Lightweight Tournament.
Win	16–2	Stephen Coll	TKO (punches)	Immortal FC 6	12 May 2012	3	2:24	Letterkenny, Ireland	
Win	15–2	Marcos Nardini	Decision (unanimous)	Cage Contender 11	8 October 2011	3	5:00	Belfast, Northern Ireland	Won the Cage Contender Lightweight Championship.
Win	14–2	Dominic McConnell	Submission (arm-triangle choke)	Immortal FC 3	11 September 2010	3	1:23	Strabane, Northern Ireland	
Win	13–2	Stuart Davies	TKO (punches)	Cage Contender 6	28 August 2010	2	2:34	Manchester, England	
Win	12–2	Tom Maguire	Submission (guillotine choke)	Cage Contender 5	24 July 2010	2	0:42	Dublin, Ireland	
Win	11–2	Ian Jones	Submission (guillotine choke)	Fight-Stars 2	28 March 2010	1	4:18	Leeds, England	
Loss	10–2	Joseph Duffy	Submission (rear-naked choke)	Spartan Fight Challenge 3	20 March 2010	1	3:06	Newport, Wales	
Win	10–1	Myles Price	Submission (guillotine choke)	Cage Contender 3	5 February 2010	1	3:27	Antrim, Northern Ireland	
Win	9–1	Ben Davis	Submission (rear-naked choke)	Tribal Warfare 5	3 October 2009	1	3:10	Connacht, Republic of Ireland	
Win	8–1	Ali MacLean	Submission (rear-naked choke)	Immortal FC 1	19 September 2009	2	4:05	Strabane, Northern Ireland	
Win	7–1	Mick Bowman	Submission (rear-naked choke)	OMMAC 1	8 August 2009	1	2:06	Liverpool, England	
Win	6–1	Mark Mills	TKO (punches)	Strike and Submit 11	5 July 2009	3	3:40	Gateshead, England	
Win	5–1	Paul Jenkins	Submission (rear-naked choke)	House of Pain 11	30 May 2009	1	2:41	Newport, Wales	
Win	4–1	Dominic McConnell	Submission (armbar)	Chaos FC 4	25 April 2009	1	1:10	Derry, Northern Ireland	
Win	3–1	Barry Oglesby	Submission (leglock)	Tribal Warfare 4	28 March 2009	1	3:30	Galway, Ireland	
Win	2–1	Ali McLean	Submission (rear-naked choke)	Ultimate Fighting Revolution 14	21 August 2008	2	4:50	Belfast, Northern Ireland	
Win	1–1	Brian Kerr	Submission (armbar)	Ultimate Fighting Revolution 13	18 May 2008	1	2:10	Belfast, Northern Ireland	
Loss	0–1	Greg Loughran	Submission (rear-naked choke)	Ultimate Fighting Revolution 5	12 March 2006	1	1:43	Toomebridge, Northern Ireland	

== Boxing record ==
Res.	Record	Opponent	Method	Event	Date	Round	Time	Location	Notes
Loss	2–2	(Poland) Wawrzyniec Bartnik	Decision (unanimous)	Prime Show MMA 17	13 June 2026	3	3:00	Częstochowa, Poland	Fighting in MMA gloves
Loss	2–1	(Poland) Borys Mańkowski	Decision (unanimous)	Fame 11: Fight Club	2 October 2021	1	15:00	Gliwice, Poland	Catchweight bout (176 lbs). Fighting in MMA gloves
Win	2–0	(Poland) Maciej Jewtuszko	Decision (majority)	EFM Show 2: Materla vs. Rimbon	11 September 2021	3	3:00	Sofia, Bulgaria	Catchweight bout (176 lbs).
Win	1–0	(Poland) Kasjusz Życiński	Decision (unanimous)	Fame 10: Don Kasjo vs. Parke	15 May 2021	5	3:00	Łódź, Poland	Catchweight bout (183 lbs). Won a 1kg golden bar and the "King's Belt".

== Custom rules record ==
Res.	Record	Opponent	Method	Event	Date	Round	Time	Location	Notes
Win	2–0	(Poland) Maciej Sulęcki	Decision (split)	Fame: Reborn	9 December 2023	5	3:00	Łódź, Poland	
Win	1–0	(Poland) Piotr Szeliga	TKO (punches)	Fame 14: Gimper vs. Tromba	14 May 2022	2	2:13	Kraków, Poland	Fight against non-standard rules, first boxing round, second and third rounds MMA. Open Weight.

== See also ==
- List of Irish UFC fighters
- List of current KSW fighters
- List of male mixed martial artists
