= Paddy Holohan =

Irish martial artist and municipal politician

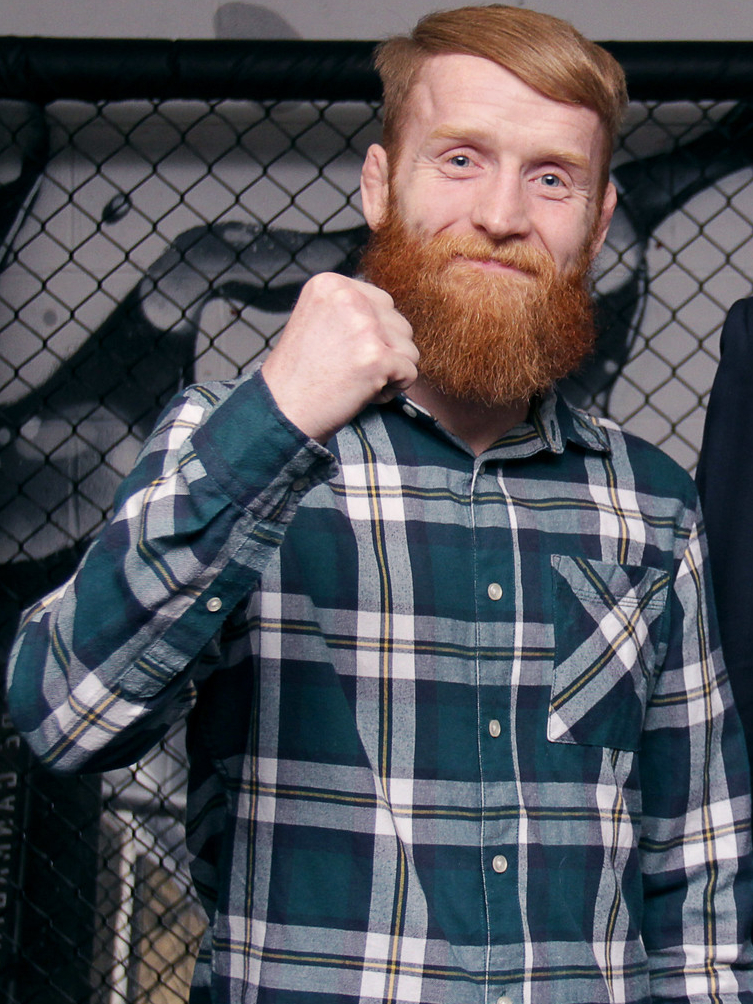
- Holohan in 2019

South Dublin County Councillor
- Incumbent
- Assumed office 24 May 2019
- Constituency: Tallaght South

Personal details
- Born: Patrick Pearse Holohan; 3 May 1988 (age 38) Tallaght, Ireland
- Party: Independent
- Other political affiliations: Sinn Féin (2019-2021)
- Martial arts career
- Other names: The Hooligan
- Height: 5 ft 9 in (175 cm)
- Weight: 125 lb (57 kg; 8 st 13 lb)
- Division: Bantamweight (2007–13), Flyweight (2014–2016)
- Reach: 69.0 in (175 cm)
- Fighting out of: Dublin, Ireland
- Team: SBG Ireland
- Trainer: John Kavanagh
- Rank: Black belt in Brazilian Jiu-Jitsu under Tom King
- Years active: 2007–2016

Mixed martial arts record
- Total: 15
- Wins: 12
- By knockout: 1
- By submission: 8
- By decision: 3
- Losses: 2
- By submission: 1
- By decision: 1
- Draws: 1

Other information
- Mixed martial arts record from Sherdog
- Last updated on: 18 July 2015

Patrick Pearse Holohan (born 3 May 1988) is an Irish politician and retired mixed martial artist who previously competed in the flyweight division of the Ultimate Fighting Championship. A professional MMA competitor from 2007 until his retirement in 2016, Holohan also competed for the promotion Cage Contender and was a competitor on The Ultimate Fighter 18.

== Early and personal life ==
Holohan's mother was placed in a Magdalene Laundry before he was born following the loss of two previous children.

For part of his childhood Holohan resided with a maternal aunt in Belfast, Northern Ireland, during the final years of the Troubles. Holohan's father figure was his maternal grandfather, a member of the Defence Forces whom Holohan credits with instilling in him discipline and morality.

Holohan became a father at age 19. He has two sons and two daughters. His eldest son is named Tiernan, after the Irish comedian Tommy Tiernan, whom Holohan credits with keeping his morale up during tough periods in his life. His son Séamus Patrick was born in 2018 and daughter Féile Éireann in 2021 and Ceóla Laragh in 2022 with his long-term partner Chelsea Hudson.

With Hudson, Holahan runs a martial arts academy, Holohan Martial Arts. Holohan released an autobiography, Hooligan, in 2019.

== Mixed martial arts career ==
After a successful career in Ireland where he compiled an undefeated 9–0–1 record, it was revealed in August 2013 that Holohan was selected to be a participant on The Ultimate Fighter 18. He faced Josh Hill for his fight to get in the house. Holohan was repeatedly taken down and had no answer for the top game of Hill and ended up losing by decision.

Holohan made his official promotional debut in the Ultimate Fighting Championship against Josh Sampo on 19 July 2014 at UFC Fight Night 46. Holohan won the fight via a rear-naked choke submission midway through the first round.

He was scheduled to face Louis Gaudinot on 4 October 2014 at UFC Fight Night 54. However, Gaudinot pulled out of the bout due to injury and was replaced by promotional newcomer Chris Kelades. Holohan lost the fight via unanimous decision. The performance earned both participants Fight of the Night honours.

Holohan faced Shane Howell on 18 January 2015, at UFC Fight Night 59. He won via unanimous decision. He returned to the cage on 18 July 2015, to face Vaughan Lee on 18 July 2015 at UFC Fight Night 72. He won via unanimous decision.

Holohan next fought Louis Smolka on 24 October 2015 at UFC Fight Night 76. Holohan lost by second round submission after taking a series of shots and then giving up his back, opening a window for Smolka to lock in the rear naked choke for the victory.

Holohan was expected to face Willie Gates on 8 May 2016 at UFC Fight Night 87. However, on 25 April, he abruptly announced his retirement, citing Factor XIII deficiency, a rare blood disorder. He was replaced on the card by Yuta Sasaki.

== Political career ==
Holohan was elected to South Dublin County Council for Sinn Féin at the 2019 local elections in May 2019.

=== Podcast controversies ===
In a 7 January 2020 episode of "Paddy Holohan's No Shame Podcast", Holohan criticised the Taoiseach Leo Varadkar over his party's intention to commemorate the Black and Tans. Holohan accused Varadkar of not understanding the society of Ireland and the history of Ireland, and of being detached from the classes of Ireland, due to his father and grandfather's Indian ethnicity. Holohan stated that when he was growing up, he was raised on stories by his own grandfather about the history of Ireland, and said that Varadkar would have instead been raised "on stories of the rebellion in India, in the idea of fighting the English there, and Gandhi and all these other stories." He also stated he would like the leader of the country to be a "family man," and to know "what it is like to have kids," in reference to Varadkar's homosexuality. On 16 January, as the 2020 Irish general election campaign was underway, Holohan was called upon by his party to apologize for his remarks. He issued an apology later the same day. In response, Varadkar accepted the apology, stating "I understand that he has apologised in the last few hours and you know that's good enough for me." Sinn Féin party leader Mary Lou McDonald also stated that she was satisfied with the apology and there would be no further action needed.

On 17 January, it emerged that Holohan had previously made comments on his podcast regarding the alleged use of sexual extortion by underage girls, whereby he claimed he had been told that teenage girls were deliberately targeting men, engaging in sexual relationships and recording evidence of same, and then threatening them with extortion of up to €10,000. Mary Lou McDonald described the comments as "beyond offensive, I actually find them upsetting". She announced that "I have moved immediately to the party's disciplinary procedures, and disciplinary action will be taken". Sinn Féin announced that afternoon that Holohan had been suspended from the party and was to face disciplinary procedures.

=== Nomination for Mayor of South Dublin ===
On 26 June 2020 it was announced that Holohan's suspension from Sinn Féin had been recently lifted and he had been reinstated to the party. The same day as his suspension was lifted, he was nominated for the position of Mayor of South Dublin by members of South Dublin County Council, but was not elected. Sinn Féin were criticised for allowing the nomination to occur, and senior figures in the party such as Pearse Doherty and Eoin O'Broin called Holohan's nomination "regrettable" and "wrong". On 6 July, as a result of the Holohan nomination Sinn Féin suspended their entire South West Dublin organisation until further notice.

=== Second disciplinary action and departure from Sinn Féin ===
In March 2021, Sinn Féin once again took disciplinary action against Holohan after Holohan refused a request to take down a Facebook post supporting a salon owner who reopened in breach of COVID-19 restrictions. Pearse Doherty explained the situation to the Irish Independent's Floating Voter podcast: "This fella made a comment, we told him that comment isn't in keeping with the party's view, we told him to withdraw it, he isn't doing so, there's a disciplinary procedure, the party will deal with that".

Later that month, it was revealed that Holohan had chosen not to renew his party membership and had become an independent councillor.

==== 2024 elections ====
Holohan stood in the 2024 Irish local elections in both Tallaght South and Tallaght Central, won seats in both, and took up his seat in Tallaght South while nominating local MMA coach Dean Donnelly to be co-opted onto the council for the Tallaght Central seat.

On 15 November 2024, Paddy Holohan declared his intention to run in the Dublin South West Dáil constituency in the 2024 Irish general election he lost this election coming 12th out of 16 candidates receiving 3.68% of first preference votes.

== Championships and accomplishments ==
- Ultimate Fighting Championship
  - Fight of the Night (One time) vs. Chris Kelades

== Mixed martial arts record ==
Professional record breakdown
15 matches	12 wins	2 losses
By knockout	1	0
By submission	8	1
By decision	3	1
Draws	1	

Res.	Record	Opponent	Method	Event	Date	Round	Time	Location	Notes
Loss	12–2–1	Louis Smolka	Submission (rear-naked choke)	UFC Fight Night: Holohan vs. Smolka	24 October 2015	2	1:29	Dublin, Ireland	
Win	12–1–1	Vaughan Lee	Decision (unanimous)	UFC Fight Night: Bisping vs. Leites	18 July 2015	3	5:00	Glasgow, Scotland	
Win	11–1–1	Shane Howell	Decision (unanimous)	UFC Fight Night: McGregor vs. Siver	18 January 2015	3	5:00	Boston, Massachusetts, United States	
Loss	10–1–1	Chris Kelades	Decision (unanimous)	UFC Fight Night: MacDonald vs. Saffiedine	4 October 2014	3	5:00	Halifax, Nova Scotia, Canada	Fight of the Night.
Win	10–0–1	Josh Sampo	Submission (rear-naked choke)	UFC Fight Night: McGregor vs. Brandao	19 July 2014	1	3:06	Dublin, Ireland	Flyweight debut.
Win	9–0–1	Artemij Sitenkov	Submission (triangle choke)	Cage Contender 14	21 July 2012	1	2:50	Dublin, Ireland	
Win	8–0–1	Damien Rooney	KO (punch and head kick)	Cage Contender 13	28 April 2012	1	1:01	Belfast, Northern Ireland	
Win	7–0–1	Neil McGuigan	Submission (rear-naked choke)	Chaos FC 9	3 September 2011	1	2:46	Derry, Northern Ireland	
Win	6–0–1	Steve McCombe	Decision (unanimous)	Cage Contender 8	12 March 2011	3	5:00	Dublin, Ireland	
Draw	5–0–1	Neil McGuigan	Draw	Chaos FC 8	12 February 2011	3	5:00	Derry, Northern Ireland	
Win	5–0	Andreas Lovbrand	Submission (triangle kimura)	KO – The Fight Before Christmas 3	3 December 2010	1	2:03	Dublin, Ireland	
Win	4–0	Milan Kovach	Submission (rear-naked choke)	Cage Contender 5	24 July 2010	1	4:58	Dublin, Ireland	
Win	3–0	Ritchie Ivory	Submission (rear-naked choke)	Ring of Combat 26	29 May 2010	1	0:00	Waterford, Ireland	
Win	2–0	Michael Daboville	Submission (triangle choke)	Pancrase Fighting Championship 2	17 April 2010	1	4:37	Marseille, France	
Win	1–0	Shane Bane	Submission (triangle choke)	ROT7 – The Next Level	28 July 2007	2	N/A	Dublin, Ireland	

=== Mixed martial arts exhibition record ===
Exhibition record breakdown		
1 match	0 wins	1 loss
By knockout	0	0
By submission	0	0
By decision	0	1

Result	Record	Opponent	Method	Event	Date	Round	Time	Location	Notes
Loss	0–1	Josh Hill	Decision (majority)	The Ultimate Fighter: Team Rousey vs. Team Tate	4 September 2013 (airdate)	2	5:00	Las Vegas, Nevada, United States	Elimination bout

== See also ==
- List of Irish UFC fighters
- List of current UFC fighters
- List of male mixed martial artists
