= Louis Smolka =

American mixed martial arts fighter

- Born: Louis Smolka; July 16, 1991 (age 35); Kapolei, Hawaii, U.S.
- Other names: Da Last Samurai
- Height: 5 ft 9 in (1.75 m)
- Weight: 135 lb (61 kg; 9 st 9 lb)
- Division: Flyweight; Bantamweight (2018-present)
- Fighting out of: Irvine, California, United States
- Team: Hawaii Elite MMA Gracie Technics (2010-2018); Team Oyama (2018-present)
- Rank: Brown belt in Judo; Junior brown belt in Kenpo Karate
- Years active: 2010–present

Mixed martial arts record
- Total: 26
- Wins: 17
- By knockout: 8
- By submission: 7
- By decision: 2
- Losses: 9
- By knockout: 2
- By submission: 3
- By decision: 4

Other information
- Mixed martial arts record from Sherdog

Louis Smolka (born July 16, 1991) is an American mixed martial artist who competes in the bantamweight division. A professional competitor since 2010, he has previously fought for the Ultimate Fighting Championship, California Xtreme Fighting, King of the Cage and Pacific Xtreme Combat. He is also former flyweight champion of both California Xtreme Fighting and Pacific Xtreme Combat.

== Mixed martial arts career ==
=== Early career ===
Smolka began his amateur career in 2010 and was able to achieve a 2–1 record in his first year of competition, also winning the X-1 amateur 135 lb. title. He would take nearly a year off before turning professional in 2012. He would pick up wins under the Destiny MMA and King of the Cage banners before moving on to the PXC promotion in late 2012. He would win all four fights he had with PXC and would leave the promotion as the flyweight champion.

=== Ultimate Fighting Championship ===
In late 2013, Louis was signed by the UFC and was slated to make his promotional debut against Alp Ozkilic at UFC Fight Night 35 on January 15, 2014. Smolka was able to come out with a unanimous decision victory.

Smolka later faced Chris Cariaso on May 10, 2014, at UFC Fight Night 40. Smolka lost the fight via split decision.

Smolka faced Richie Vaculik on November 8, 2014, at UFC Fight Night 55. He won the fight via knockout in the third round, finishing him with a side kick to the face and swarmed on Vaculik til the fight was stopped. The win also earned Smolka his first Performance of the Night bonus award.

Smolka faced Neil Seery on July 11, 2015, at UFC 189. He won the fight by unanimous decision.

Smolka faced Paddy Holohan on October 24, 2015, at UFC Fight Night 76 in the main event. After a back and forth first round featuring creative maneuvers by both men, Smolka was able to establish top position on Holohan midway in round two and deliver a series of shots, prompting Holohan to give up his back. Smolka was then able to lock in the rear-naked choke and secure the victory.

Smolka next faced Ben Nguyen on July 13, 2016, at UFC Fight Night 91. He won the fight via TKO in the second round and was awarded a Performance of the Night bonus.

Smolka was expected to face Sergio Pettis on October 1, 2016, at UFC Fight Night 96. However, Pettis pulled out of the fight citing a minor injury and was replaced by promotional newcomer Brandon Moreno. Smolka lost the fight via submission in the first round.

Smolka faced Ray Borg on December 30, 2016, at UFC 207. At the weigh-ins, Borg missed weight for the bout, coming in at 129.5 pounds. As a result, he was fined 30% of his fight purse, which went to Smolka, who agreed to take a catchweight bout. Smolka lost the fight by unanimous decision.

Smolka faced Tim Elliott on April 15, 2017, at UFC on Fox 24. He lost the fight by unanimous decision. Both participants were awarded Fight of the Night for their performance.

Smolka faced Matheus Nicolau on December 30, 2017, at UFC 219. He lost the fight via unanimous decision.

=== Post UFC ===
After being released from UFC in the beginning of 2018, Smolka moved to Irvine, California to train at Team Oyama and try to turn his career around. After getting scolded by his manager, Smolka realized he had a drinking problem that had hindered his career for the last years. Smolka gave up drinking completely and claims to have been sober since January 2018.

Smolka's release from the UFC also prompted him to reconsider his career as a mixed martial artist. Faced with lower salary and limited growth opportunities, Smolka admitted to nearly walking away from MMA.

Smolka faced Tyrone Christian Gorgonia at Gladiator Challenge - MMA Fighting Championship on April 21, 2018. He won the fight via TKO in the first round.

=== Return to UFC ===
On November 13, 2018, news surfaced that Smolka has re-signed a four-fight contract with the UFC and faced promotional newcomer Su Mudaerji at UFC Fight Night: Blaydes vs. Ngannou 2 on November 24, 2018. The bout marked Smolka's return to the bantamweight division. Smolka admitted to struggling to make it to the flyweight limit in the past, admitting "I would be depleting myself to pretty close to death." He won the fight via an armbar in round two.

Smolka faced Matt Schnell on March 9, 2019, at UFC Fight Night 146. He lost the fight via a triangle submission in the first round.

Smolka faced Ryan McDonald on September 14, 2019, at UFC Fight Night 158. He won the fight via TKO in the first round.

Smolka was expected to face Davey Grant at UFC on ESPN: Ngannou vs. Rozenstruik on March 28, 2020. Due to the COVID-19 pandemic, the event was eventually postponed, and ultimately the pairing was scrapped.

Smolka faced Casey Kenney on May 30, 2020, at UFC on ESPN: Woodley vs. Burns. He lost the fight via submission through a guillotine choke in round one.

Smolka was scheduled to face José Alberto Quiñónez on November 14, 2020, at UFC Fight Night 182. At the weigh-ins, Smolka weighed in at 139 pounds, three pounds over the bantamweight non-title fight limit. The bout was to proceed at catchweight with Smolka fined 20 percent of his purse, which would go to his opponent Quiñónez. Smolka pulled out of their fights the next day as consequence of the weigh-cut and those bouts were canceled. The bout was left intact and eventually took place at UFC on ESPN 19 on December 5, 2020. Smolka won the fight via a technical knockout in round two.

Smolka was scheduled to face Sean O'Malley on July 10, 2021, at UFC 264. However, Smolka pulled out of the fight in late-June citing injury and was replaced by promotional newcomer Kris Moutinho.

Smolka faced Vince Morales on December 4, 2021, at UFC on ESPN 31. He lost the fight via knockout out in round one.

Smolka faced Davey Grant on May 14, 2022, at UFC on ESPN 36. He lost the bout after getting knocked out in the third round after getting dropped with a leg kick.

Smolka announced on June 7, 2022, that he was “excited to test free agency” via his Twitter, confirming that he had been cut from the UFC.

== Personal life ==
Smolka and his wife Yumi have a daughter, Lucy.

== Championships and accomplishments ==
- Pacific Xtreme Combat
  - Pacific Xtreme Combat Flyweight Championship (One time)
- Ultimate Fighting Championship
  - Performance of the Night (Two times) vs. Richie Vaculik, Ben Nguyen
  - Fight of the Night (One time) vs. Tim Elliott
  - UFC.com Awards
    - 2017: Ranked #6 Fight of the Year vs. Tim Elliott

== Mixed martial arts record ==
Professional record breakdown
26 matches	17 wins	9 losses
By knockout	8	2
By submission	7	3
By decision	2	4

Res.	Record	Opponent	Method	Event	Date	Round	Time	Location	Notes
Loss	17–9	Davey Grant	KO (punches)	UFC on ESPN: Błachowicz vs. Rakić	May 14, 2022	3	0:49	Las Vegas, Nevada, United States	
Loss	17–8	Vince Morales	KO (punches)	UFC on ESPN: Font vs. Aldo	December 4, 2021	1	2:02	Las Vegas, Nevada, United States	
Win	17–7	José Alberto Quiñónez	TKO (punches)	UFC on ESPN: Hermansson vs. Vettori	December 5, 2020	2	2:15	Las Vegas, Nevada, United States	
Loss	16–7	Casey Kenney	Submission (guillotine choke)	UFC on ESPN: Woodley vs. Burns	May 30, 2020	1	3:03	Las Vegas, Nevada, United States	
Win	16–6	Ryan McDonald	TKO (punches)	UFC Fight Night: Cowboy vs. Gaethje	September 14, 2019	1	4:43	Vancouver, British Columbia, Canada	
Loss	15–6	Matt Schnell	Submission (triangle choke)	UFC Fight Night: Lewis vs. dos Santos	March 9, 2019	1	3:18	Wichita, Kansas, United States	
Win	15–5	Su Mudaerji	Submission (armbar)	UFC Fight Night: Blaydes vs. Ngannou 2	November 24, 2018	2	2:07	Beijing, China	Return to Bantamweight.
Win	14–5	Kyle Estrada	TKO (doctor stoppage)	CXF 15	October 20, 2018	2	5:00	Burbank, California, United States	Won the vacant CXF Flyweight Championship.
Win	13–5	Tycen Lynn	Submission (guillotine choke)	Destiny MMA: Fight Night 5	June 23, 2018	3	N/A	Honolulu, Hawaii, United States	
Win	12–5	Tyrone Christian Gorgonia	TKO (punches)	Gladiator Challenge: MMA Fighting Championship	April 21, 2018	1	1:15	Rancho Mirage, California, United States	
Loss	11–5	Matheus Nicolau	Decision (unanimous)	UFC 219	December 30, 2017	3	5:00	Las Vegas, Nevada, United States	
Loss	11–4	Tim Elliott	Decision (unanimous)	UFC on Fox: Johnson vs. Reis	April 15, 2017	3	5:00	Kansas City, Missouri, United States	Fight of the Night.
Loss	11–3	Ray Borg	Decision (unanimous)	UFC 207	December 30, 2016	3	5:00	Las Vegas, Nevada, United States	Catchweight (129.5 lb) bout; Borg missed weight.
Loss	11–2	Brandon Moreno	Submission (guillotine choke)	UFC Fight Night: Lineker vs. Dodson	October 1, 2016	1	2:23	Portland, Oregon, United States	
Win	11–1	Ben Nguyen	TKO (punches and elbows)	UFC Fight Night: McDonald vs. Lineker	July 13, 2016	2	4:41	Sioux Falls, South Dakota, United States	Performance of the Night.
Win	10–1	Paddy Holohan	Submission (rear-naked choke)	UFC Fight Night: Holohan vs. Smolka	October 24, 2015	2	4:09	Dublin, Ireland	
Win	9–1	Neil Seery	Decision (unanimous)	UFC 189	July 11, 2015	3	5:00	Las Vegas, Nevada, United States	
Win	8–1	Richie Vaculik	KO (side kick and punches)	UFC Fight Night: Rockhold vs. Bisping	November 8, 2014	3	0:18	Sydney, Australia	Performance of the Night.
Loss	7–1	Chris Cariaso	Decision (split)	UFC Fight Night: Brown vs. Silva	May 10, 2014	3	5:00	Cincinnati, Ohio, United States	
Win	7–0	Alp Ozkilic	Decision (unanimous)	UFC Fight Night: Rockhold vs. Philippou	January 15, 2014	3	5:00	Duluth, Georgia, United States	
Win	6–0	Ale Cali	TKO (punches)	Pacific Xtreme Combat 41	November 9, 2013	2	1:52	Pasig, Philippines	Flyweight debut. Won the PXC Flyweight Championship.
Win	5–0	Jessie Rafols	Submission (rear-naked choke)	Pacific Xtreme Combat 39	September 14, 2013	1	1:59	Pasig, Philippines	
Win	4–0	Alvin Cacdac	Submission (rear-naked choke)	Pacific Xtreme Combat 35	February 16, 2013	3	3:59	Pasig, Philippines	
Win	3–0	Bryan To Hang Lam	Submission (armbar)	Pacific Xtreme Combat 34	November 17, 2012	1	3:54	Quezon City, Philippines	
Win	2–0	Kawika Martin	Submission (D'Arce choke)	KOTC - Mana	October 20, 2012	2	2:53	Honolulu, Hawaii, United States	
Win	1–0	Shane Pacarro	TKO (doctor stoppage)	Destiny MMA - Unleashed	April 28, 2012	2	5:00	Waipahu, Hawaii, United States	

== See also ==
- List of male mixed martial artists
