= UFC Fight Night: Condit vs. Alves =

UFC mixed martial arts event in 2015

- The poster for UFC Fight Night: Condit vs. Alves
- Promotion: Ultimate Fighting Championship
- Date: May 30, 2015
- Venue: Goiânia Arena
- City: Goiânia, Brazil
- Attendance: 3,500

Event chronology
UFC 187: Johnson vs. Cormier	UFC Fight Night: Condit vs. Alves	UFC Fight Night: Boetsch vs. Henderson

UFC Fight Night: Condit vs. Alves (also known as UFC Fight Night 67) was a mixed martial arts event held on May 30, 2015, at the Goiânia Arena in Goiânia, Brazil.

== Background ==
The event was the second that the UFC has hosted in Goiânia, Brazil after UFC Fight Night: Belfort vs. Henderson on November 9, 2013.

The event was headlined by a welterweight bout between former WEC & Interim UFC Welterweight champion Carlos Condit and veteran contender Thiago Alves.

A welterweight bout between TJ Waldburger and Wendell Oliveira was originally booked for UFC Fight Night 61. However, the bout was cancelled on the day of the weigh-ins, after Waldburger passed out while cutting weight. The pairing had been rescheduled for this event, but it was scrapped yet again after Waldburger pulled out of the bout on May 19 due to undisclosed reasons. He was replaced by promotional newcomer Darren Till.

Gilbert Burns was expected to face Norman Parke at this event. However, Burns was forced to withdraw from the event due to injury and was replaced by Francisco Trinaldo.

Renato Moicano was expected to face Mirsad Bektić at the event. However, Moicano pulled out of the fight in late April due to a knee injury and was replaced by Lucas Martins.

Jessica Penne was expected to face Juliana Lima at the event. However on May 1, Penne was removed from the card and placed into a UFC Women's Strawweight Championship fight against champion Joanna Jędrzejczyk on June 20, 2015 at UFC Fight Night 69. She was replaced by promotional newcomer Ericka Almeida.

Yan Cabral was expected to face K. J. Noons at the event. However on May 19, Cabral pulled out of the fight due to dengue fever and was replaced by Alex Oliveira.

On June 18, it was announced that Rony Jason tested positive for hydrochlorothiazide, which is a banned diuretic, therefore his submission victory against Damon Jackson was overturned and he received a nine-month suspension. The UFC rescinded Jason's $50,000 "Performance of the Night" award. Jason requested an analysis of his second sample, which also came positive for the diuretic. This card also featured the UFC debut of Darren Till

== Results ==
Main Card (Fox Sports 1)
Weight class				Method	Round	Time	Notes
Welterweight	Carlos Condit	def.	Thiago Alves	TKO (doctor stoppage)	2	5:00
Featherweight	Charles Oliveira	def.	Nik Lentz	Submission (guillotine choke)	3	1:10
Welterweight	Alex Oliveira	def.	K. J. Noons	Submission (rear-naked choke)	1	2:51
Light Heavyweight	Francimar Barroso	def.	Ryan Jimmo	Decision (unanimous) (30–27, 30–27, 29–28)	3	5:00
Lightweight	Francisco Trinaldo	def.	Norman Parke	Decision (split) (28–29, 29–28, 29–28)	3	5:00
Welterweight	Darren Till	def.	Wendell Oliveira	KO (elbows)	2	1:37
Preliminary Card (Fox Sports 1)
Featherweight	Rony Jason	vs.	Damon Jackson	No Contest (overturned)	1	3:31	(Note: Originally a Submission (triangle choke) win for Jason; Overturned after he tested positive for a banned diuretic.)
Flyweight	Jussier Formiga	def.	Wilson Reis	Decision (unanimous) (29–28, 29–28, 29–28)	3	5:00
Welterweight	Nicolas Dalby	def.	Elizeu Zaleski dos Santos	Decision (split) (29–28, 28–29, 29–28)	3	5:00
Featherweight	Mirsad Bektić	def.	Lucas Martins	TKO (punches)	2	0:30
Preliminary Card (UFC Fight Pass)
Women's Strawweight	Juliana Lima	def.	Ericka Almeida	Decision (unanimous) (30–27, 30–27, 30–25)	3	5:00
Welterweight	Tom Breese	def.	Luiz Dutra Jr.	TKO (punches)	1	4:58

== Bonus awards ==
The following fighters were awarded $50,000 bonuses:

- Fight of the Night: Charles Oliveira vs. Nik Lentz
- Performance of the Night: Charles Oliveira and Rony Jason*

*Due to Jason's failed drug test, UFC rescinded his $50,000 "Performance of the Night" award. The award will not be reissued to a different fighter on the card.

== See also ==
- List of UFC events
- 2015 in UFC
