= Jon Delos Reyes =

Guamanian mixed martial artist

Jon delos Reyes
- Born: Chalan Pago-Ordot, Guam
- Nationality: Guamanian (Overseas American)
- Height: 5 ft 6 in (1.68 m)
- Weight: 125 lb (57 kg; 8.9 st)
- Division: Flyweight
- Reach: 68.0 in (173 cm)
- Style: Sanda, Kickboxing, BJJ
- Fighting out of: Tamuning, Guam
- Team: Countershot MMA
- Rank: Black belt in Sanda; Brown belt in Brazilian Jiu-Jitsu
- Years active: 2008-2015

Mixed martial arts record
- Total: 13
- Wins: 8
- By knockout: 3
- By submission: 5
- Losses: 5
- By knockout: 1
- By submission: 3
- By decision: 1

Other information
- Mixed martial arts record from Sherdog

Jon delos Reyes is a former Guamanian professional mixed martial artist who formerly competed in the Flyweight division of the Ultimate Fighting Championship.

== Background ==
Reyes was born and raised in Guam, and both of his parents are Filipino. Reyes began training in the martial arts in high school with Brazilian jiu-jitsu before transitioning into kickboxing and mixed martial arts. Reyes is the former Grappler's Quest Champion, NAGA Champion, Pan Asia Brazilian Jiu-Jitsu Champion, Pan Asia No-Gi Grappling Champion, Marianas Open Brazilian Jiu-Jitsu Champion, Guam Kickboxing Invitational Champion, and an IBJJF-Las Vegas Open Medalist.

== Mixed martial arts career ==
=== Early career ===
Reyes made his professional MMA debut in 2008 and compiled an overall record of 7-2 before being signed by the Ultimate Fighting Championship. Reyes had originally tried out for The Ultimate Fighter 18 and didn't make the cut but demonstrated enough talent to earn a call from the promotion a year later.

=== Ultimate Fighting Championship ===
Reyes made his promotional debut against Dustin Kimura On January 4, 2014 at UFC Fight Night 34. Reyes lost via armbar submission in the first round.

Reyes was next scheduled to face Richie Vaculik at UFC Fight Night 43 on June 28, 2014. However, Reyes was forced from the bout with an injury and replaced by promotional newcomer Roldan Sangcha-an.

Reyes then dropped down to the Flyweight division and faced Kyoji Horiguchi at UFC Fight Night 52 on September 20, 2014. Reyes was defeated via first-round TKO.

Reyes faced Roldan Sangcha-an on May 16, 2015 at UFC Fight Night 66. He won the fight by submission in the second round. The win also earned Reyes his first Fight of the Night bonus award.

Reyes faced Neil Seery on October 24, 2015 at UFC Fight Night 76. He lost the bout via submission in the second round.

== Championships and accomplishments ==
- Ultimate Fighting Championship
  - Fight of the Night (One time)

== Mixed martial arts record ==
Professional record breakdown
13 matches	8 wins	5 losses
By knockout	3	1
By submission	5	3
By decision	0	1

Res.	Record	Opponent	Method	Event	Date	Round	Time	Location	Notes
Loss	8–5	Neil Seery	Submission (guillotine choke)	UFC Fight Night: Holohan vs. Smolka	October 24, 2015	2	4:12	Dublin, Ireland	
Win	8–4	Roldan Sangcha-an	Submission (rear-naked choke)	UFC Fight Night: Edgar vs. Faber	May 16, 2015	2	3:13	Pasay, Philippines	Fight of the Night.
Loss	7–4	Kyoji Horiguchi	TKO (punches)	UFC Fight Night: Hunt vs. Nelson	September 20, 2014	1	3:48	Saitama, Japan	Flyweight debut.
Loss	7–3	Dustin Kimura	Submission (armbar)	UFC Fight Night: Saffiedine vs. Lim	January 4, 2014	1	2:13	Marina Bay, Singapore	
Win	7–2	Troy Bantiag	Submission (armbar)	PXC 33	September 1, 2012	1	3:46	Pasig, Philippines	
Win	6–2	Josh Duenas	TKO (doctor stoppage)	Rites of Passage 12	April 20, 2012	2	5:00	Saipan, Northern Mariana Islands	
Win	5–2	Virgil Ortega	TKO (punches)	PXC 28	November 26, 2011	1	N/A	Pasig, Philippines	
Win	4–2	Derek Rangamar	Submission (rear-naked choke)	Trench Warz 12	May 21, 2010	1	2:30	Saipan, Northern Mariana Islands	
Loss	3–2	Russell Doane	Submission (rear-naked choke)	808 Battlegrounds: Dropping Jaws	February 19, 2010	1	1:48	Waipahu, Hawaii, United States	
Win	3–1	Chris Laayug	TKO (punches)	Trench Warz 10	July 31, 2009	1	1:17	Saipan, Northern Mariana Islands	
Loss	2–1	Kyle Aguon	Decision (unanimous)	PXC 15	July 25, 2008	3	5:00	Pasig, Philippines	
Win	2–0	Brandon Chandler	Submission (rear-naked choke)	PXC 14	March 10, 2008	1	N/A	Pasig, Philippines	
Win	1–0	Conrad Iba	Submission (slam)	Rites of Passage 4	February 16, 2008	1	2:04	Saipan, Northern Mariana Islands	

== See also ==
- List of current UFC fighters
- List of male mixed martial artists
