= Cathal Pendred =

Irish actor and mixed martial artist

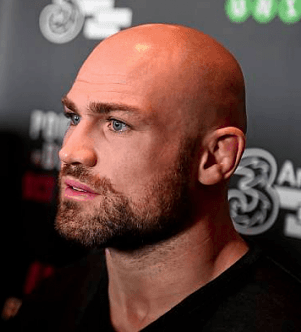
- Pendred at the premiere of 'The Corrupted'
- Born: 2 September 1987 (age 39); Boston, Massachusetts, United States
- Other names: The punisher
- Nationality: Irish
- Height: 6 ft 1 in (1.85 m)
- Weight: 170 lb (77 kg; 12 st)
- Division: Middleweight; Welterweight
- Reach: 75 in (190 cm)
- Stance: Orthodox
- Fighting out of: Dublin, Ireland
- Team: SBG Ireland
- Rank: Blue belt in Brazilian Jiu-Jitsu under John Kavanagh
- Years active: 2009–2015

Mixed martial arts record
- Total: 22
- Wins: 17
- By knockout: 6
- By submission: 1
- By decision: 10
- Losses: 4
- By knockout: 2
- By submission: 1
- By decision: 1
- Draws: 1

Other information
- Occupation: Actor (B.Sc) Analytical Science (M.Sc) Climate Change
- University: Dublin City University (B.Sc)
- Spouse: Síomha Ní Ruairc (m. 2024)
- Notable school: Belvedere College
- Mixed martial arts record from Sherdog

Cathal Pendred is an Irish actor and former mixed martial artist who competed in the Ultimate Fighting Championship. He was the Cage Warriors Welterweight World Champion.

== Background ==
Pendred was born in Boston, Massachusetts to Irish immigrant parents, when he was four years old he moved to Dublin, Ireland with his parents where he was raised alongside a younger brother and two younger sisters. Pendred competed in rugby growing up and was talented, winning the Leinster Schools Senior Cup.

== Mixed martial arts career ==
=== Early career ===
Pendred started his professional career in 2009. He became the number one ranked welterweight in Ireland in 2010 after winning the national title. In March 2013 he became the Cage Warriors Welterweight Champion after beating the title holder Gael Grimaud in London, England.

=== The Ultimate Fighter ===
Pendred was selected as a cast member of the nineteenth season of The Ultimate Fighter on 25 March 2014. He was then chosen as the third pick for the middleweights on coach B.J. Penn's team.

In the quarter-final rounds, Pendred fought Team Edgar middleweight Urbina. Pendred defeated Urbina by decision after three rounds. Pendred fought Eddie Gordon in the semi-finals. He lost the bout by a split decision.

=== Ultimate Fighting Championship ===
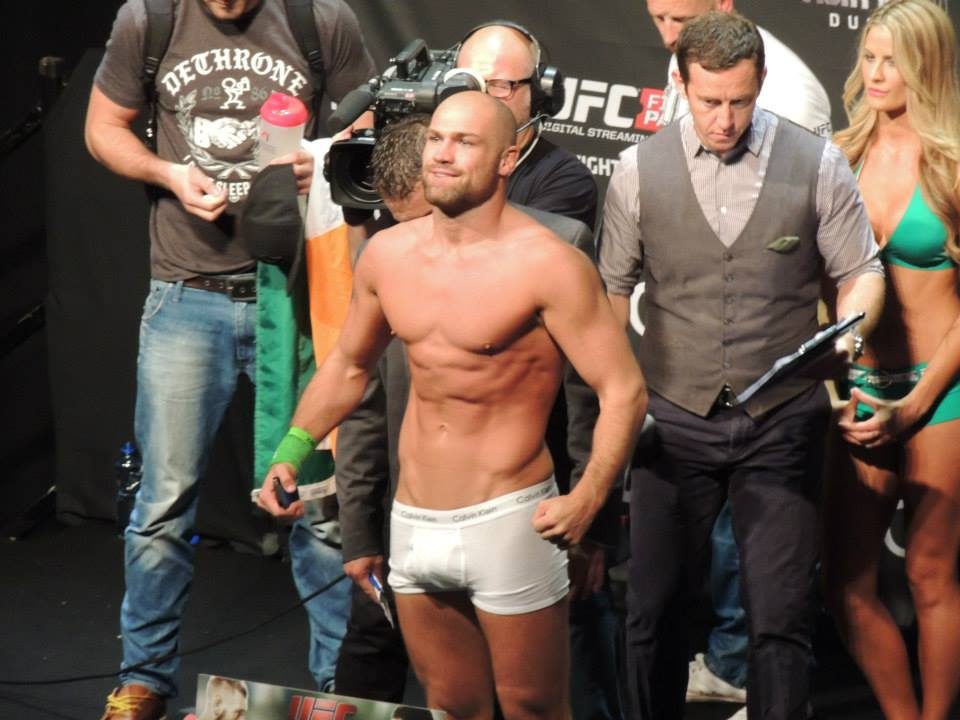
Pendred weighing in at UFC Fight Night Dublin

Pendred faced Team Penn teammate Mike King at middleweight on 19 July 2014 at UFC Fight Night 46. He was victorious via second-round submission. The win earned him 'Fight of the Night' honours along with Mike King. However, King would also later go on to fail the drug test which resulted in his half of the bonus going to Pendred.

Pendred dropped to the welterweight division where he fought Gasan Umalatov on 4 October 2014 at UFC Fight Night: Nelson vs. Story. He defeated Umalatov by a split decision.

Pendred next faced Sean Spencer on 18 January 2015 at UFC Fight Night 59. Pendred won the fight by a controversial unanimous decision. Both Joe Rogan and Mike Goldberg had felt Spencer had dominated the fight and declared on air how baffling the decision was; later UFC president Dana White echoed this sentiment on air. Likewise, all 15 major MMA media outlets scored the fight in favour of Spencer.

Pendred faced Augusto Montaño on 13 June 2015 at UFC 188. He won the fight by unanimous decision. Montaño tested positive for testosterone metabolites in the post-fight drug test.

Pendred faced John Howard as a short-notice replacement on 11 July 2015 at UFC 189. He lost the fight via split decision.

Pendred next faced Tom Breese on 24 October 2015 at UFC Fight Night 76. Pendred lost the fight by TKO in the first round.

Pendred announced his retirement from MMA on 25 November 2015.

== Acting career ==
On 23 May 2017, it was announced that Pendred had been cast in a lead role in the Amazon produced TV series Lore, which is based on the popular podcast of the same name. Pendred plays Michael Cleary, a real-life character from Irish folklore in the horror anthology series. Michael is married to the younger Bridget (played by Holland Roden). When Bridget starts making more money than he does, and starts questioning his decisions, Michael is convinced that his loving wife has been replaced by a changeling. Lore premiered on 13 October 2017.

== Personal life ==
Pendred was educated in Belvedere College, Dublin and won a Leinster Senior Schools Cup medal in 2005 alongside future Irish internationals Cian Healy and Ian Keatley.

Pendred attended Dublin City University where he studied forensics, he graduated with a BSc degree in Analytical Science in 2012.

In April 2014 Cathal was pictured carrying a baby dolphin into the ocean. The dolphin had become beached and was unable to return to deep enough water on its own. A picture was taken with the dolphin in Cathal's arms as he carried it into the sea, this picture went viral soon after the incident. Subsequently, the story was reported across the globe.

In March 2022, Pendred graduated with a master's degree in climate change from Dublin City University.

In June 2024, Pendred married Virgin Media Ireland presenter Síomha Ní Ruairc.

=== Other endeavors ===
Cathal was the subject of a 2013 MTV UK mini-documentary entitled "Pendred".

In 2015 Pendred became the first UFC fighter to support an anti-domestic violence group. He spearheaded a campaign which promoted the positive influence men can play in stopping domestic abuse of women and children. The campaign involved the release of a powerful YouTube video in which Pendred spoke about the role men can play in preventing abuse.

== Filmography ==
=== Film ===
Year	Title	Role	Notes
2016	Split	Enforcer	Also stunt player
2016	Jack Taylor: In Purgatory	Xavier	
2017	Cardboard Gangsters	Security Officer	
2017	My Name Is Lenny	Roofie	
2017	Release	Marcus	
2018	Black Water	Dax	
2019	The Corrupted	Gerry Dwyer	

=== Television ===
Year	Title	Role	Notes
2013	Ripper Street	Phillip	Guest role; 2 episodes
2013	Pendred	Himself	1 episode; (MTV UK production)
2016	Ray Donovan	Joxy Maguire	Episode: "The Texan"
2017	Into the Badlands	Rafferty	Guest role; 2 episodes
2017	Lore	Michael Cleary	Episode: "Black Stockings"
2018	Strike Back	Anton Krupin	Episode: #6.10
2018	Magnum P.I.	Wade Steuben	Guest role; 2 episodes

== Championships and accomplishments ==
=== Mixed martial arts ===
- Ultimate Fighting Championship
  - Fight of the Night (One time) vs. Mike King
  - UFC.com Awards
    - 2014: Ranked #10 Fight of the Year vs. Mike King
- Cage Warriors Fighting Championship
  - CWFC Welterweight Championship (One time)
- Cage Contender
  - Cage Contender Welterweight Championship (One time)

== Mixed martial arts record ==
Professional record breakdown
22 matches	17 wins	4 losses
By knockout	6	2
By submission	1	1
By decision	10	1
Draws	1	

Res.	Record	Opponent	Method	Event	Date	Round	Time	Location	Notes
Loss	17–4–1	Tom Breese	TKO (punches)	UFC Fight Night: Holohan vs. Smolka	24 October 2015	1	4:37	Dublin, Ireland	
Loss	17–3–1	John Howard	Decision (split)	UFC 189	11 July 2015	3	5:00	Las Vegas, Nevada, United States	
Win	17–2–1	Augusto Montaño	Decision (unanimous)	UFC 188	13 June 2015	3	5:00	Mexico City, Mexico	
Win	16–2–1	Sean Spencer	Decision (unanimous)	UFC Fight Night: McGregor vs. Siver	18 January 2015	3	5:00	Boston, Massachusetts, United States	
Win	15–2–1	Gasan Umalatov	Decision (split)	UFC Fight Night: Nelson vs. Story	4 October 2014	3	5:00	Stockholm, Sweden	
Win	14–2–1	Mike King	Technical Submission (rear-naked choke)	UFC Fight Night: McGregor vs. Brandao	19 July 2014	2	3:33	Dublin, Ireland	Middleweight bout. Fight of the Night.
Win	13–2–1	Che Mills	TKO (corner stoppage)	CWFC 55	1 June 2013	3	1:47	Dublin, Ireland	Non-title bout; Mills missed weight (170.7 lbs).
Win	12–2–1	Gael Grimaud	Decision (unanimous)	Cage Warriors: 52	9 March 2013	5	5:00	London, England	Won the Cage Warriors Welterweight Championship.
Win	11–2–1	Bruno Carvalho	Decision (unanimous)	Cage Warriors: 49	27 October 2012	3	5:00	Cardiff, Wales	
Win	10–2–1	David Bielkheden	Decision (unanimous)	Cage Warriors: 47	2 June 2012	3	5:00	Dublin, Ireland	
Draw	9–2–1	Danny Mitchell	Draw	Cage Warriors: Fight Night 2	8 September 2011	3	5:00	Amman, Jordan	
Win	9–2	Nico Musoke	Decision (unanimous)	OT: On Top 2	18 June 2011	2	5:00	Glasgow, Scotland	OTP Welterweight Tournament Semi-final, Withdrew from final against Steven Ray and was replaced by Misoke
Win	8–2	Vladimir Malko	TKO (punches)	Cage Warriors: 42	28 May 2011	2	3:14	Cork City, Ireland	
Win	7–2	Liam Shannon	TKO (punches)	Cage Contender 8	12 March 2011	3	2:03	Dublin, Ireland	Defended the Cage Contender Welterweight Championship.
Loss	6–2	Lee Chadwick	TKO (punches)	OMMAC 8	4 December 2010	1	0:27	Liverpool, England	Middleweight bout.
Win	6–1	Jamie Rogers	Decision (unanimous)	Cage Warriors 39: The Uprising	27 November 2010	3	5:00	Cork City, Ireland	
Win	5–1	Yuri Malko	TKO (punches)	TNP: Boiling Points	28 August 2010	1	0:00	Wexford, Ireland	
Win	4–1	Liam Shannon	Decision (unanimous)	Cage Contender 5	24 July 2010	3	5:00	Dublin, Ireland	Won the Cage Contender Welterweight Championship.
Win	3–1	Jonny Shiels	Decision (unanimous)	Cage Contender 4	1 May 2010	3	5:00	Belfast, Northern Ireland	
Win	2–1	Merv Mulholland	TKO (punches)	KO: The Fight Before Christmas 2	2 December 2009	2	4:02	Dublin, Ireland	
Loss	1–1	Ronan McKay	Submission (triangle armbar)	Immortal Fighting Championship 1	19 September 2009	3	0:00	Strabane, Northern Ireland	
Win	1–0	Attila Horvarth	TKO (punches)	Strabane Fight Team: Fight Night 2	21 February 2009	1	0:38	Strabane, Northern Ireland	Middleweight bout.

== Mixed martial arts exhibition record ==
Exhibition record breakdown		
2 matches	1 win	1 loss
By decision	1	1

Res.	Record	Opponent	Method	Event	Date	Round	Time	Location	Notes
Loss	1–1	Eddie Gordon	Decision (split)	The Ultimate Fighter: Team Edgar vs. Team Penn	18 June 2014 (airdate)	3	5:00	Las Vegas, Nevada, United States	TUF 19 semi-final round.
Win	1–0	Hector Urbina	Decision (unanimous)	The Ultimate Fighter: Team Edgar vs. Team Penn	23 April 2014 (airdate)	3	5:00	Las Vegas, Nevada, United States	TUF 19 preliminary round.

== See also ==
- List of Irish UFC fighters
- List of current UFC fighters
- List of male mixed martial artists
