= Louis Gaudinot =

American martial artist

- Born: Louis J. Gaudinot; August 28, 1984 (age 42); Yonkers, New York, United States
- Other names: Goodnight
- Height: 5 ft 3 in (1.60 m)
- Weight: 125.2 lb (56.8 kg; 8.94 st)
- Division: Flyweight; Bantamweight
- Reach: 63.0 in (160 cm)
- Fighting out of: Hoboken, New Jersey, United States
- Team: Team Tiger Schulmann
- Rank: Fourth degree black belt in Kyokushin Karate under Tiger Schulmann
- Years active: 2009–present

Mixed martial arts record
- Total: 13
- Wins: 8
- By knockout: 3
- By submission: 2
- By decision: 3
- Losses: 4
- By knockout: 1
- By decision: 4
- No contests: 1

Other information
- Mixed martial arts record from Sherdog

Louis J. Gaudinot (born August 28, 1984) is an American professional mixed martial artist who formerly competed in the UFC's Flyweight division. A professional competitor since 2009, Gaudinot has also formerly competed on Spike TV's The Ultimate Fighter: Team Bisping vs. Team Miller as a Bantamweight.

== Background ==
Gaudinot began training in martial arts with Tiger Schulmann well over twenty years ago because of where he grew up and how small he was as a child. Being tiny in a disinvested neighborhood, Louis's parents knew he would have to defend himself at one or many points in his life, so they brought him to the Tiger Schulmann's in Yonkers NY when he was six years old. Originally, he trained in Kyokushin Karate and over time began also training in grappling. Gaudinot later earned a fourth-degree black belt in karate.

== Mixed martial arts career ==
=== Early career ===
After many years of training, in 2008, Gaudinot made his amateur debut. He held a 3–1 record as an amateur before turning professional in 2009.

=== Ring of Combat ===
Gaudinot signed with New Jersey's Ring of Combat to compete as a professional in April 2009. His debut came at Ring of Combat 24 against fellow 0-0 fighter, Chris Aquino. Gaudinot controlled the bout and won the fight via unanimous decision after two, four-minute rounds. After the fight, he stirred some controversy when he flipped off Aquino's corner.

Gaudinot fought on the next card at Ring of Combat 25 and took his first professional loss, losing a unanimous decision to Nick Cottone.

At Ring of Combat 26, Gaudinot bounced back from his loss to Cottone with a second-round TKO victory over Jeff Cressman. Two months later Gaudinot was again in action and again was fighting on back-to-back Ring of Combat cards. On the Ring of Combat 27 card he competed in his first three-round fight, winning via unanimous decision against Nate Williams.

Gaudinot fought against Tuan Pham at Ring of Combat 28, winning the fight via KO in the first round. The impressive victory earned Gaudinot a chance at the vacant Ring of Combat Flyweight Championship. His title shot came at Ring of Combat 31 against Jesse Riggleman. Gaudinot dominated the bout and won via submission (guillotine choke) near the end of the first round.

=== The Ultimate Fighter ===
In 2011, Gaudinot signed with the UFC to compete on The Ultimate Fighter: Team Bisping vs. Team Miller. In the first episode, Gaudinot faced Paul McVeigh; winning via TKO in the third round. The win gained Gaudinot entry into the Ultimate Fighter house. He was selected as a part of Team Bisping.

Gaudinot next fought against Team Mayhem's Dustin Pague. Gaudinot lost the fight in the second round via rear-naked choke submission. The fight also won Gaudinot and Pague an additional $25,000 for the fan-voted "Fight of the Season".

=== Ultimate Fighting Championship ===
Gaudinot made his official UFC debut on December 3, 2011, at The Ultimate Fighter 14 Finale against Johnny Bedford. Gaudinot lost to Bedford via TKO in the third round.

Gaudinot returned to the flyweight division and faced former Jungle Fight Bantamweight Champion, John Lineker, on May 5, 2012, at UFC on Fox 3. The bout was contested at a catchweight of 127 lb, as Lineker missed weight. Gaudinot defeated Lineker via guillotine choke submission in the second round after an action-packed, back-and-forth first two rounds. Both participants earned Fight of the Night honors for their performances.

Gaudinot was expected to face Darren Uyenoyama on October 5, 2012, at UFC on FX 5. However, Gaudinot was forced out of the bout with an injury and replaced by promotional newcomer Phil Harris.

Gaudinot faced Tim Elliott on August 31, 2013, at UFC 164. He lost the fight via dominant unanimous decision.

Gaudinot faced Phil Harris at UFC Fight Night 37. He won the fight via submission in the first round. However, on June 20, the win was overturned to a No Contest after it was revealed that Gaudinot had failed his drug test.

Gaudinot was expected to face Patrick Holohan on October 4, 2014, at UFC Fight Night: MacDonald vs. Saffiedine, but pulled out of the bout due to injury.

Gaudinot faced Kyoji Horiguchi on January 3, 2015, at UFC 182. He lost the fight by unanimous decision and was subsequently released from the organization.

=== Post-UFC career ===
In his first fight since being released from the UFC, Gaudinot faced off against Bellator veteran Claudio Ledesma in the main event of CFFC 51 on September 12, 2015. Gaudinot made a successful rebound from a three-fight slump, winning the fight with a dominant unanimous decision verdict.

The win over Ledesma granted Gaudinot a title shot against the CFFC Flyweight Champion Sidemar Honório, which took place at CFFC 57 on March 19, 2016. He won the fight via first-round knockout, claiming the championship which he later vacated with no title defenses.

Gaudinot then challenged Phil Caracappa for the Ring of Combat Bantamweight Championship at ROC 65 on September 21, 2018. He lost the fight via unanimous decision.

== Bare-knuckle boxing ==
=== Bare Knuckle Fighting Championship ===
Gaudinot was expected to make his debut against Sean Santella in a flyweight bout at BKFC 61 on May 11, 2024. However, on April 24, 2024, the bout was pulled from the card for unknown reasons.

== Championships and accomplishments ==
=== Mixed martial arts ===
- Cage Fury Fighting Championships
  - CFFC Flyweight Champion (One time; former)
- Ring of Combat
  - Ring of Combat Flyweight Champion (One time)
- Ultimate Fighting Championship
  - Fight of the Season (The Ultimate Fighter 14)
  - Fight Of The Night (One time)
  - UFC.com Awards
    - 2012: Ranked #10 Fight of the Year vs. John Lineker

== Mixed martial arts record ==
Professional record breakdown
14 matches	8 wins	5 losses
By knockout	3	1
By submission	2	0
By decision	3	4
No contests	1	

Res.	Record	Opponent	Method	Event	Date	Round	Time	Location	Notes
Loss	8–5 (1)	Phil Caracappa	Decision (unanimous)	Ring of Combat 65	September 21, 2018	3	5:00	Atlantic City, New Jersey, United States	For the Ring of Combat Bantamweight Championship.
Win	8–4 (1)	Sidemar Honório	TKO (punches)	CFFC 57: Gaudinot vs. Honório	March 19, 2016	1	0:59	Philadelphia, Pennsylvania, United States	Won the CFFC Flyweight Championship.
Win	7–4 (1)	Claudio Ledesma	Decision (unanimous)	CFFC 51: Ledesma vs. Gaudinot	September 12, 2015	3	5:00	Bethlehem, Pennsylvania, United States	
Loss	6–4 (1)	Kyoji Horiguchi	Decision (unanimous)	UFC 182	January 3, 2015	3	5:00	Las Vegas, Nevada, United States	
NC	6–3 (1)	Phil Harris	NC (overturned)	UFC Fight Night: Gustafsson vs. Manuwa	March 8, 2014	1	1:13	London, England	Originally a submission win (guillotine choke); overturned due to a failed drug test
Loss	6–3	Tim Elliott	Decision (unanimous)	UFC 164	August 31, 2013	3	5:00	Milwaukee, Wisconsin, United States	
Win	6–2	John Lineker	Technical Submission (guillotine choke)	UFC on Fox: Diaz vs. Miller	May 5, 2012	2	4:54	East Rutherford, New Jersey, United States	Catchweight (127 lbs) bout; Lineker missed weight. Fight of the Night
Loss	5–2	Johnny Bedford	TKO (knees to the body)	The Ultimate Fighter 14 Finale	December 3, 2011	3	1:58	Las Vegas, Nevada, United States	Bantamweight bout.
Win	5–1	Jessie Riggleman	Submission (guillotine choke)	Ring of Combat 31	September 24, 2010	1	4:43	Atlantic City, New Jersey, United States	Won the vacant Ring of Combat Flyweight Championship.
Win	4–1	Tuan Pham	KO (punch)	Ring of Combat 28	February 19, 2010	1	1:09	Atlantic City, New Jersey, United States	
Win	3–1	Nate Williams	Decision (unanimous)	Ring of Combat 27	November 20, 2009	3	4:00	Atlantic City, New Jersey, United States	
Win	2–1	Jeff Cressman	TKO (punches)	Ring of Combat 26	September 11, 2009	2	0:24	Atlantic City, New Jersey, United States	
Loss	1–1	Nick Cottone	Decision (unanimous)	Ring of Combat 25	June 12, 2009	2	4:00	Atlantic City, New Jersey, United States	
Win	1–0	Chris Aquino	Decision (unanimous)	Ring of Combat 24	April 17, 2009	2	4:00	Atlantic City, New Jersey, United States	

=== Mixed martial arts exhibition record ===
Exhibition record breakdown		
2 matches	1 win	1 loss
By knockout	1	0
By submission	0	1
By decision	0	0
No contests	0	

Res.	Record	Opponent	Method	Event	Date	Round	Time	Location	Notes
Loss	1–1	Dustin Pague	Submission (rear-naked choke)	The Ultimate Fighter: Team Bisping vs. Team Miller	2011	2	2:32	Las Vegas, Nevada, United States	Quarterfinal Bout. Fight Of The Season.
Win	1–0	Paul McVeigh	TKO (elbow and punches)	The Ultimate Fighter: Team Bisping vs. Team Miller	2011	3	4:59	Las Vegas, Nevada, United States	Preliminary Bout.

== See also ==
- List of current UFC fighters
- List of male mixed martial artists
