= 2012 in Cage Warriors =

Mixed martial arts events

Information
- First date: February 11, 2012
- Last date: December 31, 2012

Events
- Total events: 12

Fights
- Total fights: 107

Chronology
2011 in Cage Warriors	2012 in Cage Warriors	2013 in Cage Warriors

2012 was the eleventh year of Cage Warriors, a mixed martial arts promotion based in the United Kingdom, comprising twelve events beginning with Cage Warriors Fight Night 3.

== Events list ==
#	Event title	Date	Arena	Location
47	Cage Warriors Fight Night 3	February 11, 2012	Al Habtoor	Beirut, Lebanon
48	Cage Warriors: 45	February 18, 2012	The Forum	London, England
49	Cage Warriors: 46	February 23, 2012	Stereo Plaza	Kyiv, Ukraine
50	Cage Warriors Fight Night 4	March 16, 2012	DWTC	Dubai, UAE
51	Cage Warriors Fight Night 5	April 12, 2012	Al-Hussein Youth City Boxing Arena	Amman, Jordan
52	Cage Warriors Fight Night 6	May 24, 2012	Khalifa Sports City	Isa Town, Bahrain
53	Cage Warriors: 47	June 2, 2012	The Helix	Dublin, Ireland
54	Cage Warriors: 48	July 21, 2012	The Forum	London, England
55	Cage Warriors Fight Night 7	September 1, 2012	Al-Hussein Youth City Boxing Arena	Amman, Jordan
56	Cage Warriors: 49	October 27, 2012	St David's Hall	Cardiff, Wales
57	Cage Warriors: 50	December 8, 2012	Kelvin Hall	Glasgow, Scotland
58	Cage Warriors: 51	December 31, 2012	The Helix	Dublin, Ireland

== Cage Warriors Fight Night 3 ==
Cage Warriors Fight Night 3 was an event held on February 11, 2012 in Beirut, Lebanon.

Main Card
Weight class				Method	Round	Time	Notes
Lightweight	Juha-Pekka Vainikainen	def.	Kyle Watson	TKO (Doctor Stoppage)	2	4:26
Middleweight	Mats Nilsson	def.	Tommy Speer	Submission (Arm Triangle)	2	4:17
Featherweight	Matteus Lahdesmaki	def.	Graham Turner	Submission (Rear Naked Choke)	1	2:19
Middleweight	Faycal Hucin	def.	Gareth Joseph	TKO (Punches)	1	1:14
Middleweight	Victor Cheng	def.	Matt Gabel	Submission (Rear Naked Choke)	2	1:49
Welterweight	Domingos Mestre	def.	John Donnelly	Decision (Unanimous)	3	5:00
Welterweight	Ben Alloway	def.	Mauro Chimento Jr	Decision (Unanimous)	3	5:00

== Cage Warriors: 45 ==
Cage Warriors: 45 was an event held on February 18, 2012 in London, England.

Main Card
Weight class				Method	Round	Time	Notes
Heavyweight	Bobby Brents	def.	Rogent Lloret	Submission (Arm Triangle)	1	4:41
Lightweight	J. P. Reese	def.	Brad Wheeler	Decision (Unanimous)	3	5:00
Middleweight	Chris Fields	def.	Jack Nason	TKO (Head Kick and Punches)	1	0:50
Featherweight	Conor McGregor	def.	Steve O'Keefe	TKO (Elbows)	1	1:33
Heavyweight	Dave Keeley	def.	Eddy Bengtsson	TKO (Punches and Elbows)	1	4:40
Middleweight	Brett Sizeland	def.	Brett Bassett	TKO (Doctor Stoppage)	2	1:47
Welterweight	Jacek Toczydlowski	def.	Shah Hussain	Decision (Unanimous)	3	5:00
Middleweight	Charlie Watts	def.	Chad Brown	TKO (Submission to punches)	2	2:12
Catchweight	Ben Hajir	def.	Michael Jones	Submission (Armbar)	3	3:06

== Cage Warriors: 46 ==
Cage Warriors: 46 was an event held on February 23, 2012 in Kyiv, Ukraine.

Main Card
Weight class				Method	Round	Time	Notes
Heavyweight	Andreas Kraniotakes	def.	Dmitry Poberezhets	Submission (Rear Naked Choke)	1	3:27
Lightweight	Diego Gonzalez	def.	Ivica Truscek	Submission (Guillotine Choke)	2	3:25
Middleweight	Pavel Kusch	def.	Alexander Starikov	Submission (Omaplata)	1	0:30
Flyweight	Phil Harris	def.	Remi Morvan	Submission (Armbar)	1	4:22
Welterweight	Alexander Voitenko	def.	Dan Hope	TKO (Punches)	3	1:11
Flyweight	Artemij Sitenkov	def.	Neil Seery	Submission (Kneebar)	1	0:55
Middleweight	Vladimir Katyhin	def.	Anatoly Safronov	Submission (Rear Naked Choke)	2	0:41
Welterweight	Sergei Churilov	def.	Anatoly Starodubstev	Submission (Achilles Lock)	1	2:51
Featherweight	James Brum	def.	Leandro Gontijo	Decision (Unanimous)	3	5:00
Featherweight	Artem Lobov	def.	Kamil Korycki	Decision (Unanimous)	3	5:00
Lightweight	Andrei Prizyuk	def.	Oleg Vival	Submission (Rear Naked Choke)	2	2:54
Featherweight	Sergey Grechka	def.	Artem Boiko	Decision (Unanimous)	3	5:00
Lightweight	Maksim Ivshin	def.	Valery Tighineanu	Decision (Unanimous)	3	5:00

== Cage Warriors Fight Night 4 ==
Cage Warriors Fight Night 4 was an event held on March 16, 2012 in Dubai, UAE.

Main Card
Weight class				Method	Round	Time	Notes
Heavyweight	Mike Hayes	def.	Andreas Kraniotakes	Submission (Kimura)	3	4:20	(Note: For Cage Warriors Heavyweight Title)
Welterweight	Assan Njie	def.	Stevie Ray	Submission (Guillotine Choke)	2	2:29
Middleweight	Lucio Linhares	def.	Kyle Baker	Decision (Unanimous)	3	5:00
Flyweight	Sheila Gaff	def.	Jennifer Maia	TKO (Punches)	1	0:10	(Note: Cage Warriors women's flyweight tournament semifinal)
Flyweight	Phil Harris	def.	Casey Dyer	Decision (Unanimous)	3	5:00
Lightweight	Mansour Barnaoui	def.	Brad Wheeler	Submission (Rear Naked Choke)	3	4:26
Welterweight	Brad Scott	def.	Mok Rahman	TKO (Body Punch)	3	2:45
Heavyweight	Cyril Asker	def.	Adam Brearley	TKO (Punches)	1	4:30

== Cage Warriors Fight Night 5 ==
Cage Warriors Fight Night 5 was an event held on April 12, 2012 in Amman, Jordan.

Main Card
Weight class				Method	Round	Time	Notes
Heavyweight	D.J. Linderman	def.	Bobby Brents	Decision (Unanimous)	3	5:00
Middleweight	Pavel Kusch	def.	John Phillips	Submission (Heel Hook)	1	0:25
Middleweight	Victor Cheng	def.	Faycal Hucin	Decision (Unanimous)	3	5:00
Featherweight	Liam James	def.	Jean N'Doye	Decision (Split)	3	5:00
Middleweight	Mike Ling	def.	Eric Cebarec	TKO (Elbows)	2	2:11
Lightweight	Piotr Hallmann	def.	Kevin Donnelly	Submission (Rear Naked Choke)	3	4:10
Bantamweight	James Brum	def.	Thomas Back	Decision (Unanimous)	3	5:00
Bantamweight	Kris Edwards	def.	Janne Elonen-Kulmala	Decision (Unanimous)	3	5:00
Light Heavyweight	Mohamed Ali	def.	Doo Hwan Kim	Decision (Unanimous)	3	5:00

== Cage Warriors Fight Night 6 ==
Cage Warriors Fight Night 6 was an event held on May 24, 2012 in Isa Town, Bahrain.

Main Card
Weight class				Method	Round	Time	Notes
Welterweight	Gael Grimaud	def.	Jesse Taylor	Submission (Armbar)	3	0:55	(Note: For Cage Warriors Welterweight Title)
Featherweight	Jim Alers	def.	Matteus Lahdesmaki	TKO (Elbows)	2	3:01
Lightweight	Ivan Buchinger	def.	Diego Gonzalez	TKO (Punches)	2	1:30
Heavyweight	Eddy Bengtsson	def.	Jay Mortimore	Submission (Smother)	1	2:46
Middleweight	John Phillips	def.	Tomas Penz	Submission (Triangle Choke)	2	3:21
Middleweight	Alan Carlos	def.	Mike Ling	Decision (Majority)	3	5:00
Bantamweight	Oliver Pastor	def.	Dino Gambatesa	KO (Punches)	1	0:52
Middleweight	Allan Love	def.	Ignas Petkus	TKO (Punches)	1	3:03

== Cage Warriors: 47 ==
Cage Warriors: 47 was an event held on June 2, 2012 in Dublin, Ireland.

Main Card
Weight class				Method	Round	Time	Notes
Heavyweight	D.J. Linderman	def.	Mike Hayes	Decision (Unanimous)	5	5:00	(Note: For Cage Warriors Heavyweight Title)
Featherweight	Conor McGregor	def.	Dave Hill	Submission (Rear Naked Choke)	2	4:10	(Note: For Cage Warriors Featherweight Title)
Featherweight	Rosi Sexton	def.	Aisling Daly	Decision (Unanimous)	3	5:00	(Note: Cage Warriors women's flyweight tournament semifinal)
Welterweight	Cathal Pendred	def.	David Bielkheden	Decision (Unanimous)	3	5:00
Flyweight	Neil Seery	def.	Mark Platts	Submission (Rear Naked Choke)	2	2:36
Catchweight	Jack Mason	def.	Tommy Quinn	Decision (Split)	3	5:00
Lightweight	Paul Redmond	def.	Yuri Malko	TKO (Punches)	2	2:05
Middleweight	Brett Sizeland	def.	Victor Peixoto	TKO (Punches)	1	1:32

== Cage Warriors: 48 ==
Cage Warriors: 48 was an event held on July 21, 2012 in London, England.

Main Card
Weight class				Method	Round	Time	Notes
Catchweight	John Phillips	def.	Chris Fields	Submission (Guillotine Choke)	2	2:04
Welterweight	Aaron Wilkinson	def.	Leigh Cohoon	Submission (Rear Naked Choke)	2	2:07
Middleweight	Denniston Sutherland	def.	Brett Sizeland	TKO (Punches)	1	4:12
Welterweight	Danny Roberts	def.	Jack Mason	Submission (Armbar)	2	2:46
Lightweight	Dale Hardiman	def.	Ido Pariente	KO (Punches)	3	0:44
Flyweight	Kris Edwards	def.	Brian Hyslop	Submission (Armbar)	2	1:44
Heavyweight	Dayman Lake	def.	Jay Mortimore	KO (Punches)	1	1:56
Welterweight	Piotr Ptasinski	def.	Jacek Toczydlowski	Decision (Unanimous)	3	5:00
Catchweight	Leon Del Gaudio	def.	Mehmet Faulds	Submission (Rear Naked Choke)	1	3:03
Middleweight	Charlie Watts	def.	Victor Peixoto	Submission (Guillotine Choke)	1	0:53

== Cage Warriors Fight Night 7 ==
Cage Warriors Fight Night 7 was an event held on September 1, 2012 in Amman, Jordan.

Main Card
Weight class				Method	Round	Time	Notes
Middleweight	Chris Fields	def.	Pavel Kusch	TKO (Punches)	3	2:05	(Note: For vacant Cage Warriors Middleweight Title)
Featherweight	Jim Alers	def.	Marcio Cesar	Submission (D'Arce Choke)	2	2:27
Lightweight	Leonardo Santos	def.	Mark Holst	Submission (Arm Triangle Choke)	1	1:15
Welterweight	Mohsen Bahari	def.	Piotr Ptasinski	Decision (Unanimous)	3	5:00
Bantamweight	Olivier Pastor	def.	Liam James	Submission (Guillotine Choke)	3	3:21
Bantamweight	James Brum	def.	James Zackary	Decision (Unanimous)	3	5:00
Light Heavyweight	Robert Krecicki	def.	Mohamed Ali	Decision (Majority)	3	5:00
Middleweight	Brett Bassett	def.	Mike Ling	KO (Punch)	1	0:38
Catchweight	Jay Furness	def.	Artem Lobov	Decision (Unanimous)	3	5:00

== Cage Warriors: 49 ==
Cage Warriors: 49 was an event held on October 27, 2012 in Cardiff, Wales.

Main Card
Weight class				Method	Round	Time	Notes
Welterweight	Cathal Pendred	def.	Bruno Carvalho	Decision (Unanimous)	3	5:00
Lightweight	Tim Newman	def.	Greg Loughran	Submission (Guillotine)	1	4:45
Middleweight	Faycal Hucin	def.	John Michael Sheil	Decision (Split)	3	5:00
Lightweight	Mervyn Mulholland	def.	Daniel Thomas	Submission (Triangle)	1	1:22
Lightweight	Paul Redmond	def.	Lewis Long	Submission (Rear Naked Choke)	2	3:34
Bantamweight	Alan Philpott	def.	Kris Edwards	Submission (Rear Naked Choke)	1	3:53
Welterweight	Lee Caers	def.	Kevin Reed	TKO (Strikes)	2	4:52
Bantamweight	Martin McDonough	def.	Dino Gambatesa	Submission (Armbar)	1	1:53
Flyweight	Neil Seery	def.	Karl Harrison	Decision (Unanimous)	3	5:00
Featherweight	Brett Johns	def.	Sam Gilbert	Decision (Unanimous)	3	5:00

== Cage Warriors: 50 ==
Cage Warriors: 50 was an event held on December 8, 2012 in Glasgow, Scotland.

Main Card
Weight class				Method	Round	Time	Notes
Catchweight	Brandon Hempleman	def.	Paul McVeigh	Decision (Unanimous)	3	5:00
Bantamweight	Wilson Reis	def.	Owen Roddy	Submission (Rear Naked Choke)	3	1:32
Welterweight	Alan Johnston	def.	Aaron Wilkinson	Decision (Unanimous)	3	5:00
Middleweight	Scott Askham	def.	Denniston Sutherland	Decision (Unanimous)	3	5:00
Featherweight	Graham Turner	def.	Nathan Beer	TKO (Strikes)	1	4:30
Catchweight	Dan Hope	def.	Avi Jack	Decision (Unanimous)	3	5:00
Catchweight	Alex Enlund	def.	Ahsan Gillani	TKO (Strikes)	1	0:39
Flyweight	Mark Connor	def.	Andy Young	Decision (Unanimous)	3	5:00

== Cage Warriors: 51 ==
Cage Warriors: 51 was an event held on December 31, 2012 in Dublin, Ireland.

Main Card
Weight class				Method	Round	Time	Notes
Lightweight	Conor McGregor	def.	Ivan Buchinger	KO (Punch)	1	3:40	(Note: For Cage Warriors Lightweight Title)
Middleweight	Jesse Taylor	def.	Chris Fields	Submission (Rear Naked Choke)	2	1:06	(Note: For Cage Warriors Middleweight Title)
Catchweight	Katja Kankaanpää	def.	Aisling Daly	Decision (Unanimous)	3	5:00
Welterweight	Jack Mason	def.	Florent Betorangal	Decision (Unanimous)	3	5:00
Lightweight	Paul Redmond	def.	Ryan Roddy	Submission (Toe Hold)	2	2:14
Bantamweight	James Brum	def.	Moktar Benkaci	Decision (Unanimous)	3	5:00
Weltwerweight	Tommy Quinn	def.	Philip Mulpeter	Decision (Majority)	3	5:00
Middleweight	Henry Fadipe	def.	Charlie Watts	TKO (Strikes)	1	1:08
