= UFC Fight Night: Gustafsson vs. Manuwa =

UFC mixed martial arts event in 2014

- The poster for UFC Fight Night: Gustafsson vs. Manuwa
- Promotion: Ultimate Fighting Championship
- Date: March 8, 2014
- Venue: The O2 Arena
- City: London, England
- Attendance: 14,604
- Total gate: $2,000,056

Event chronology
The Ultimate Fighter China Finale: Kim vs. Hathaway	UFC Fight Night: Gustafsson vs. Manuwa	UFC 171: Hendricks vs. Lawler

UFC Fight Night: Gustafsson vs. Manuwa (also known as UFC Fight Night 37) was a mixed martial arts event held on March 8, 2014, at The O2 Arena in London, England. The event was shown live in the UK on Channel 5 and BT Sport and in the United States on UFC Fight Pass.

== Background ==
A bout between Alexander Gustafsson and Jimi Manuwa headlined the event.

UFC President Dana White initially announced that a bout between Gustafsson and Antônio Rogério Nogueira would be headlining the event. However, just 5 days after the fight was announced news came that Nogueira had to withdraw from the bout due to an injury. Later, reports came that said that Nogueira had never agreed to take the fight against Gustafsson at all.

Ross Pearson was expected to face Melvin Guillard in a rematch at the event. However, Pearson pulled out of the bout citing a knee injury and was replaced by Michael Johnson.

Brad Pickett was expected to make his Flyweight debut against Ian McCall on this card. However, on February 13, it was announced that McCall had pulled out of the bout and was replaced by promotional newcomer Neil Seery.

A bout between Roland Delorme and Davey Grant was cancelled after the weigh ins the day before the event due to Grant suffering a torn meniscus.

== Results ==
Fight card (UFC Fight Pass)
Weight class				Method	Round	Time	Notes
Light Heavyweight	Alexander Gustafsson	def.	Jimi Manuwa	TKO (knee and punches)	2	1:18
Lightweight	Michael Johnson	def.	Melvin Guillard	Decision (unanimous) (30–27, 30–27, 29–28)	3	5:00
Flyweight	Brad Pickett	def.	Neil Seery	Decision (unanimous) (30–27, 30–27, 29–28)	3	5:00
Welterweight	Gunnar Nelson	def.	Omari Akhmedov	Submission (guillotine choke)	1	4:36
Preliminary card (UFC Fight Pass)
Light Heavyweight	Ilir Latifi	def.	Cyrille Diabaté	Submission (ninja choke)	1	3:02
Middleweight	Luke Barnatt	def.	Mats Nilsson	TKO (head kick and punches)	1	4:24
Middleweight	Cláudio Silva	def.	Brad Scott	Decision (unanimous) (29–28, 29–28, 29–28)	3	5:00
Welterweight	Igor Araújo	def.	Danny Mitchell	Decision (unanimous) (30–27, 30–27, 30–27)	3	5:00
Flyweight	Louis Gaudinot	vs.	Phil Harris	No Contest (overturned)	1	1:13	(Note: Originally a submission (guillotine choke) victory for Gaudinot, the result was changed to "No Contest" after Gaudinot tested positive for a banned diuretic during a post fight screening.)

== Bonus awards ==
The following fighters received $50,000 bonuses:

- Fight of the Night: Alexander Gustafsson vs. Jimi Manuwa
- Performance of the Night: Alexander Gustafsson and Gunnar Nelson

== See also ==
- List of UFC events
- 2014 in UFC
