= Neil Seery =

Irish mixed martial artist

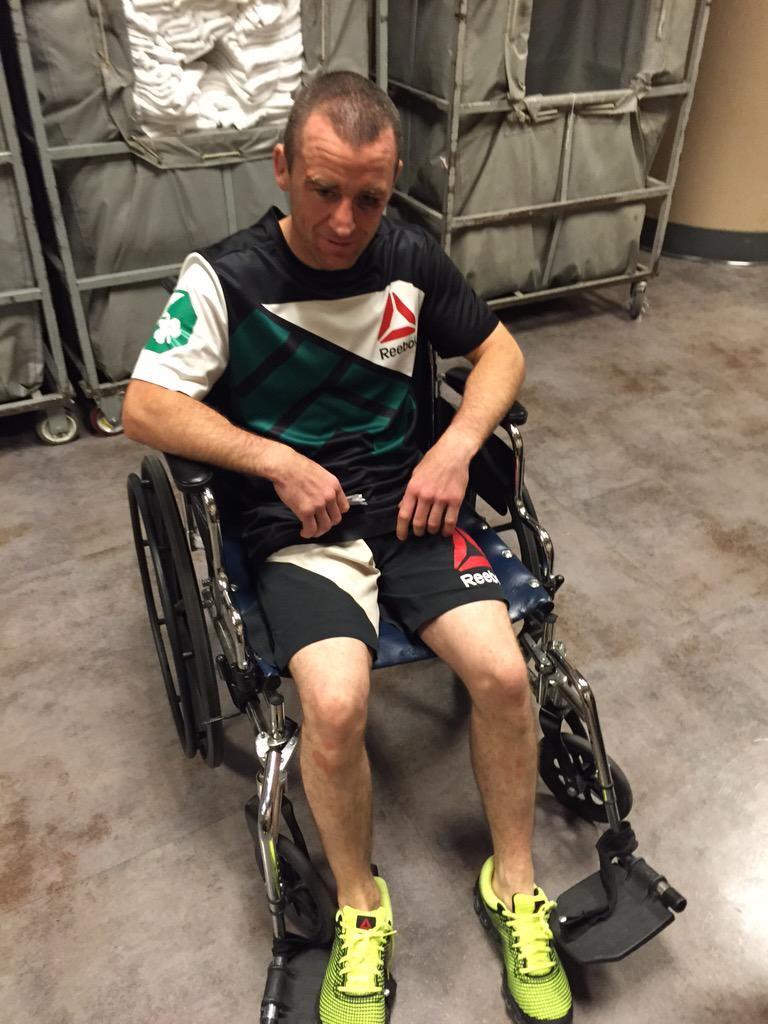
- Neil Seery
- Born: 30 August 1979 (age 47); Dublin, Ireland
- Other names: 2Tap; Piglet
- Nationality: Irish
- Height: 5 ft 4 in (1.63 m)
- Weight: 56.7 kg (125 lb; 8.93 st)
- Division: Flyweight
- Reach: 64.0 in (163 cm)
- Team: Team Ryano MMA
- Rank: Brown belt in Karate; Brown belt in Brazilian Jiu-Jitsu under Andy Ryan
- Years active: 2005–2017

Mixed martial arts record
- Total: 29
- Wins: 16
- By knockout: 6
- By submission: 6
- By decision: 4
- Losses: 13
- By knockout: 1
- By submission: 6
- By decision: 5
- By disqualification: 1

Other information
- Mixed martial arts record from Sherdog
- Last updated on: lifelong Manchester United season ticket holder.

Neil Seery (born 30 August 1979) is a retired Irish professional mixed martial artist, who most recently competed in the flyweight division of the UFC. Beginning his career in 2005, Seery also competed for BAMMA, Cage Warriors, and RINGS. He was the Cage Warriors Flyweight Champion.

== Mixed martial arts career ==
=== Early career ===
Seery made his professional debut in 2005 and after starting off his career at 1–4, Seery was able to bounce back, compiling a record of 8–8 before he began competing for the Cage Warriors promotion in his home country of Ireland. Under the promotion's banner, Seery went 5–1, capturing the Flyweight Championship in the process.

=== Ultimate Fighting Championship ===
Seery made his UFC debut at UFC Fight Night 37 on 8 March 2014 as a replacement for Ian McCall against Brad Pickett, and was signed to a four-fight contract. A huge underdog against Pickett, Seery lost unanimously on the judges' score cards.

In his second fight for the promotion, Seery faced Phil Harris at UFC Fight Night 46 on 19 July 2014. This was a rematch of Seery's fight with Harris at BAMMA 3, which Seery lost via unanimous decision. He won the fight by unanimous decision.

Seery was expected to face Richie Vaculik at UFC Fight Night 55 on 8 November 2014. Subsequently, Seery pulled out of the fight and was replaced by Louis Smolka.

Seery faced Chris Beal on 24 January 2015 at UFC on Fox 14. He won the back-and-forth fight by unanimous decision.

Seery faced Louis Smolka on 11 July 2015 at UFC 189. He lost the fight by unanimous decision.

Seery faced Jon Delos Reyes on 24 October 2016 at UFC Fight Night 76. He won the fight via submission in the second round. The victory also produced a Performance of the Night bonus.

Seery next faced Kyoji Horiguchi on 8 May 2016 at UFC Fight Night 87. He lost the fight via unanimous decision.

Seery was expected to face Ian McCall on 19 November 2016 at UFC Fight Night 99. However, as Seery was weighing in for the event, it was announced that McCall had to pull out of the fight after becoming ill due to the effects of his weight cut and the bout was scrapped.

Seery faced Alexandre Pantoja at UFC Fight Night 113 on July 16, 2017. He lost the fight via submission in the third round. Seery confirmed his intention to retire from MMA competition after this fight.

== Championships and accomplishments ==
- Cage Warriors
  - Cage Warriors Flyweight Championship (One time)
- Ultimate Fighting Championship
  - Performance of the Night (One time)

== Mixed martial arts record ==
Professional record breakdown
29 matches	16 wins	13 losses
By knockout	6	1
By submission	6	6
By decision	4	5
By disqualification	0	1

Res.	Record	Opponent	Method	Event	Date	Round	Time	Location	Notes
Loss	16–13	Alexandre Pantoja	Submission (rear-naked choke)	UFC Fight Night: Nelson vs. Ponzinibbio	16 July 2017	3	2:31	Glasgow, Scotland	
Loss	16–12	Kyoji Horiguchi	Decision (unanimous)	UFC Fight Night: Overeem vs. Arlovski	8 May 2016	3	5:00	Rotterdam, Netherlands	
Win	16–11	Jon delos Reyes	Submission (guillotine choke)	UFC Fight Night: Holohan vs. Smolka	24 October 2015	2	4:12	Dublin, Ireland	Performance of the Night.
Loss	15–11	Louis Smolka	Decision (unanimous)	UFC 189	11 July 2015	3	5:00	Las Vegas, Nevada, United States	
Win	15–10	Chris Beal	Decision (unanimous)	UFC on Fox: Gustafsson vs. Johnson	24 January 2015	3	5:00	Stockholm, Sweden	
Win	14–10	Phil Harris	Decision (unanimous)	UFC Fight Night: McGregor vs. Brandao	19 July 2014	3	5:00	Dublin, Ireland	
Loss	13–10	Brad Pickett	Decision (unanimous)	UFC Fight Night: Gustafsson vs. Manuwa	8 March 2014	3	5:00	London, England	
Win	13–9	Mikael Silander	Submission (armbar)	CWFC 55	1 June 2013	3	3:57	Dublin, Ireland	Won the inaugural Cage Warriors Flyweight Championship.
Win	12–9	Paul Marin	TKO (body kick)	CWFC 53	13 April 2013	1	1:22	Glasgow, Scotland	
Win	11–9	Karl Harrison	Decision (unanimous)	Cage Warriors: 49	27 October 2012	3	5:00	Cardiff, Wales	
Win	10–9	Mark Platts	Submission (rear-naked choke)	Cage Warriors: 47	2 June 2012	2	2:46	Dublin, Ireland	
Loss	9–9	Artemij Sitenkov	Submission (kneebar)	Cage Warriors: 46	23 February 2012	1	0:55	Kyiv, Ukraine	
Win	9–8	Niko Gjoka	KO (punches)	Cage Warriors: 44	1 October 2011	2	4:04	Kentish Town, England	
Win	8–8	Damien Rooney	Decision (unanimous)	CC 7: Fields vs. Kelly	13 November 2010	3	5:00	Belfast, Northern Ireland	
Loss	7–8	Phil Harris	Decision (unanimous)	BAMMA 3	15 May 2010	3	5:00	Birmingham, England	
Loss	7–7	Jordy Peute	Submission (kneebar)	CW 12: Nightmare	29 November 2009	2	0:17	Belfast, Northern Ireland	
Win	7–6	Erikas Suslovas	Submission (armbar)	Bushido Lithuania: Hero's 2009	14 November 2009	1	0:29	Vilnius, Lithuania	
Win	6–6	Neil McLeod	Submission (armbar)	EB: Extreme Brawl	5 September 2009	3	1:02	London, England	
Win	5–6	Neil McLeod	TKO (punches)	EB: Extreme Brawl	21 March 2009	2	4:57	London, England	
Loss	4–6	James Doolan	Submission (triangle choke)	SAS 9: Strike and Submit 9	8 February 2009	1	1:59	Gateshead, England	
Loss	4–5	Andreas Lovbrand	TKO (knee injury)	TW: Tribal Warfare	20 September 2008	3	N/A	Galway, Ireland	
Win	4–4	Peter Wilson	TKO (punches)	UFR 14: Ultimate Fighting Revolution 14	21 August 2008	2	N/A	Belfast, Northern Ireland	
Win	3–4	Steve McCombe	Submission (rear-naked choke)	UFR 13: Ultimate Fighting Revolution 13	18 May 2008	2	4:56	Lurgan, Northern Ireland	
Win	2–4	Husen Muhamed	TKO (punches)	COT 2: Cage of Truth	8 March 2008	2	N/A	Dublin, Ireland	
Loss	1–4	Andreas Lovbrand	Decision (split)	UFR 10: Ultimate Fighting Revolution 10	6 October 2007	3	5:00	Galway, Ireland	
Loss	1–3	Paul McVeigh	Submission (rear-naked choke)	Cage Rage Contenders: The Real Deal	26 May 2007	1	1:10	Dublin, Ireland	
Win	1–2	Steve McCombe	TKO (punches)	ROT: Ring of Truth 6	17 February 2007	1	4:25	Dublin, Ireland	
Loss	0–2	Micky Young	DQ (soccer kick)	ROT: Ring of Truth 4	29 April 2006	1	N/A	Dublin, Ireland	
Loss	0–1	Michael Leonard	Submission (triangle choke)	RINGS Ireland: Reborn	15 October 2005	N/A	N/A	Dublin, Ireland	

== See also ==
- List of Irish UFC fighters
- List of current UFC fighters
- List of male mixed martial artists
