= UFC Fight Night: McGregor vs. Brandão =

UFC mixed martial arts event in 2014

- The poster for UFC Fight Night: McGregor vs. Brandão
- Promotion: Ultimate Fighting Championship
- Date: 19 July 2014
- Venue: 3Arena
- City: Dublin, Ireland
- Attendance: 9,500
- Total gate: $1.4 million

Event chronology
UFC Fight Night: Cowboy vs. Miller	UFC Fight Night: McGregor vs. Brandão	UFC on Fox: Lawler vs. Brown

UFC Fight Night: McGregor vs. Brandão (also known as UFC Fight Night 46) was a mixed martial arts event held on 19 July 2014, at The 3Arena in Dublin, Ireland.

== Background ==
This was the second time that the organization has hosted an event in Dublin, following UFC 93 in 2009.

The event was expected to be headlined by a featherweight bout between Conor McGregor and Cole Miller. However, Miller was forced to pull out due to an injury, and was replaced by Diego Brandão. Despite the change with one of the headlining participants, ticket demand was high for the event, with nearly all tickets selling out within a few hours of going on sale.

Ryan LaFlare was scheduled to face Gunnar Nelson at the event. However, LaFlare was removed from the card and was replaced by Zak Cummings.

Tom Lawlor was expected to face Ilir Latifi at the event, but Lawlor pulled out of the bout with an injury and was replaced by promotional newcomer Chris Dempsey.

== Results ==
Main Card (UFC Fight Pass)
Weight class				Method	Round	Time	Notes
Featherweight	Conor McGregor	def.	Diego Brandão	TKO (punches)	1	4:05
Welterweight	Gunnar Nelson	def.	Zak Cummings	Submission (rear-naked choke)	2	4:48
Flyweight	Ian McCall	def.	Brad Pickett	Decision (unanimous) (30–27, 30–27, 29–28)	3	5:00
Lightweight	Norman Parke	def.	Naoyuki Kotani	TKO (punches)	2	3:41
Preliminary card (UFC Fight Pass)
Light Heavyweight	Ilir Latifi	def.	Chris Dempsey	TKO (punches)	1	2:07
Flyweight	Neil Seery	def.	Phil Harris	Decision (unanimous) (30–27, 30–27, 30–27)	3	5:00
Middleweight	Cathal Pendred	def.	Mike King	Technical Submission (rear-naked choke)	2	3:33
Middleweight	Trevor Smith	def.	Tor Troéng	Decision (unanimous) (29–28, 29–28, 29–28)	3	5:00
Light Heavyweight	Nikita Krylov	def.	Cody Donovan	TKO (punches)	1	4:57
Flyweight	Paddy Holohan	def.	Josh Sampo	Submission (rear-naked choke)	1	3:06

== Bonus awards ==
The following fighters received $50,000 bonuses:

- Fight of the Night: Cathal Pendred vs. Mike King ^
- Performance of the Night: Conor McGregor and Gunnar Nelson

^ Bonus winner Mike King had his award rescinded after testing positive for anabolic steroids during his post fight drug screening.

== See also ==
- List of UFC events
- 2014 in UFC
