= Augusto Montaño =

Mexican mixed martial arts fighter

- Born: Salvador Augusto Montaño; October 25, 1984 (age 42); Mexico City, Mexico
- Other names: Dodger
- Height: 6 ft 1 in (1.85 m)
- Weight: 170 lb (77 kg; 12 st)
- Division: Welterweight; Middleweight
- Reach: 73 in (185 cm)
- Fighting out of: Mexico City, Mexico
- Team: Bonebreakers MMA
- Trainer: Raúl Senk
- Rank: Brown belt in Galvan Combat Systems
- Years active: 2008–2016

Mixed martial arts record
- Total: 18
- Wins: 15
- By knockout: 10
- By submission: 5
- Losses: 3
- By knockout: 1
- By decision: 2

Other information
- Mixed martial arts record from Sherdog

Salvador Augusto Montaño (born October 25, 1984) is a Mexican former mixed martial artist who competed in the welterweight division of the Ultimate Fighting Championship.

== Mixed martial arts career ==
=== Early career ===
Montaño started training at age 15 in Kung Fu for sport and to know how to respond to the physical aggression and violence embedded in what he grew up in coming from a hard and dangerous neighborhood in Mexico.

Montaño made his professional mixed martial arts debut in November 2008. He won and defended middleweight titles in Xtreme Fighter Society, Xtreme Fighters Latino and Xtreme Kombat several times.

Montaño fought extensively in his native Mexico and amassed a record of 14–1 before joining the Ultimate Fighting Championship.

=== Ultimate Fighting Championship ===
Montaño made his promotional debut against Chris Heatherly on November 15, 2014, at UFC 180. Montaño won the fight via TKO in the first round.

Montaño faced Cathal Pendred on June 13, 2015, at UFC 188. He lost the fight by unanimous decision. Montaño tested positive for testosterone metabolites in the post-fight drug test and was given a one-year suspension.

Montaño next faced future UFC Welterweight Champion Belal Muhammad on September 17, 2016, at UFC Fight Night 94. He lost the fight via TKO in the third round.

== Championships and accomplishments ==
- Xtreme Fighter Society
  - XFS Middleweight Championship (One time)
- Xtreme Fighters Latino
  - XFL Middleweight Championship (One time)
- Xtreme Kombat
  - XK Middleweight Championship (One time)
  - Two successful title defenses
- ELLA Lucha Libre Vs. MMA
  - One Night Tournament

== Mixed martial arts record ==
Professional record breakdown
18 matches	15 wins	3 losses
By knockout	10	1
By submission	5	0
By decision	0	2

Res.	Record	Opponent	Method	Event	Date	Round	Time	Location	Notes
Loss	15–3	Belal Muhammad	TKO (punches)	UFC Fight Night: Poirier vs. Johnson	September 17, 2016	3	4:19	Hidalgo, Texas, United States	
Loss	15–2	Cathal Pendred	Decision (unanimous)	UFC 188	June 13, 2015	3	5:00	Mexico City, Mexico	
Win	15–1	Chris Heatherly	TKO (knees)	UFC 180	November 15, 2014	1	4:50	Mexico City, Mexico	
Win	14–1	Santana-Sol Martinez	KO (punches)	Jackson's MMA Series 12	May 31, 2014	1	1:38	Pueblo, Colorado, United States	Welterweight debut.
Win	13–1	Jason Clayton	Submission (punches)	Jackson's MMA Series 11	August 10, 2013	1	4:24	Albuquerque, New Mexico, United States	
Win	12–1	Edwin Aguilar	TKO (punches)	Xtreme Kombat 17	September 21, 2012	1	1:20	Mexico City, Mexico	Defended the XK Middleweight Championship.
Win	11–1	Rafael Arias	TKO (punches)	Xtreme Kombat 13	June 1, 2012	1	1:09	Mexico City, Mexico	Defended the XK Middleweight Championship.
Win	10–1	Julio Cesar Cruz	TKO (punches)	Xtreme Kombat 9	March 25, 2012	1	1:16	Mexico City, Mexico	Won the XK Middleweight Championship.
Loss	9–1	Sam Alvey	Decision (unanimous)	Chihuahua Extremo	November 5, 2011	3	5:00	Chihuahua, Mexico	
Win	9–0	Edvaldo de Oliveira	Submission (guillotine choke)	Jungle Fight 22	September 18, 2010	2	0:41	São Paulo, Brazil	
Win	8–0	Jorge Enrique Macias	TKO (punches)	Xtreme Fighters Latino 4	November 5, 2009	1	0:53	Mexico City, Mexico	Won the XFL Middleweight Championship.
Win	7–0	Lucio Hernandez	KO (punches)	Xtreme Fighters Latino 3	October 15, 2009	1	2:06	Mexico City, Mexico	
Win	6–0	Daniel Aragon	Submission (rear-naked choke)	Xtreme Fighters Latino 1	August 22, 2009	1	1:46	Mexico City, Mexico	
Win	5–0	Mike Lemaire	Submission (armbar)	MMA Xtreme 23	August 15, 2009	1	1:41	Cancun, Mexico	
Win	4–0	João Assis	TKO (punches)	Total Combat 33	July 11, 2009	1	4:43	Mexico City, Mexico	
Win	3–0	Alberto Lopez	Submission (armbar)	Xtreme Fighter Society 1	November 28, 2008	1	0:57	Mexico City, Mexico	Won the XFS Middleweight Championship.
Win	2–0	Miguel Carrasco	TKO (punches)	Xtreme Fighter Society 1	November 28, 2008	3	2:25	Mexico City, Mexico	
Win	1–0	Jorge Serratos	TKO (punches)	Xtreme Fighter Society 1	November 28, 2008	1	1:11	Mexico City, Mexico	

== See also ==
- List of current UFC fighters
- List of Mexican UFC fighters
- List of male mixed martial artists
