= Janičić =

Janičić is a South Slavic surname. Notable persons with the surname include:

- Boro Janičić
- Miloš Janičić
- Nemanja Janičić
- Predrag Janičić, musician from the Yugoslav gock band Griva
