= Alex Oliveira =

Brazilian mixed martial arts fighter

- Born: February 21, 1988 (age 38); Três Rios, Rio de Janeiro, Brazil
- Other names: Cowboy
- Height: 5 ft 11 in (1.80 m)
- Weight: 185 lb (84 kg; 13 st 3 lb)
- Division: Lightweight; Welterweight
- Reach: 76 in (193 cm)
- Stance: Orthodox
- Fighting out of: Três Rios, Rio de Janeiro, Brazil
- Team: ATS (2011–2013, 2017–present); Tata Fight Team (2013–2018)
- Trainer: André Tadeu
- Rank: Dark blue prajied in Muay Thai; Blue belt in Brazilian Jiu-Jitsu
- Years active: 2011–present

Kickboxing record
- Total: 3
- Wins: 3
- By knockout: 3

Mixed martial arts record
- Total: 48
- Wins: 25
- By knockout: 15
- By submission: 5
- By decision: 5
- Losses: 20
- By knockout: 7
- By submission: 9
- By decision: 4
- Draws: 1
- No contests: 2

Other information
- Children: 10
- Mixed martial arts record from Sherdog

Alex Oliveira (born February 21, 1988) is a Brazilian professional mixed martial artist who competes in the Welterweight division. He is best known for his tenure fighting in the Ultimate Fighting Championship (UFC).

== Background ==
Born and raised in Três Rios, Rio de Janeiro, Oliveira worked for a time as a construction worker and bull rider before he starting training in martial arts. Oliveira had three brothers – of whom two deceased due to violent crime – and four sisters. He also trained in Muay Thai for a couple of years before switching to mixed martial arts at the age of 22.

== Mixed martial arts career ==
Fighting out of Três Rios, he made his professional debut competing in the welterweight division in December 2011. He compiled a record of 11–2–1 (1), including a two-fight stint for Bitetti Combat while competing exclusively for regional promotions in his native Brazil. After taking a unanimous decision victory over Joilton Santos, Oliveira signed with the UFC in early 2015.

=== Ultimate Fighting Championship (2015-2022) ===
==== 2015 ====
Oliveira made his promotional debut as a short notice replacement against Gilbert Burns on March 21, 2015, at UFC Fight Night 62, filling in for an injured Josh Thomson. After arguably winning each of the first two rounds, Oliveira eventually lost via submission in the third round.

For his second fight in the UFC, Oliveira was again tabbed as short notice replacement and faced K.J. Noons on May 30, 2015, at UFC Fight Night 67, filling in for Yan Cabral. Oliveira won the fight via submission in the first round.

Competing in his third UFC fight in just over three months, Oliveira faced promotional newcomer Joe Merritt on June 27, 2015, at UFC Fight Night 70. Oliveira won the fight by unanimous decision.

Oliveira faced Piotr Hallmann in a lightweight bout on November 7, 2015, at UFC Fight Night 77. He won the fight by knockout in the third round. The win also earned Oliveira his first Performance of the Night bonus award.

==== 2016 ====
Oliveira fought Donald Cerrone on February 21, 2016, at UFC Fight Night 83, filling in for Tim Means. Oliveira lost the fight via submission in the first round.

Oliveira faced James Moontasri on July 23, 2016, at UFC on Fox 20. He won the one-sided fight via unanimous decision.

Oliveira next faced Will Brooks in a lightweight bout on October 1, 2016, at UFC Fight Night 96. The bout took place at a catchweight of 161.5 lbs, as Oliveira missed weight. Oliveira won the fight via KO in the third round.

Oliveira faced Tim Means on December 30, 2016, at UFC 207. The bout was halted in the first round after Means landed several knees to the head of Oliveira while he was considered a grounded opponent. As a result, Oliveira was unable to continue after the foul occurred. Subsequently, referee Dan Miragliotta judged that the foul was accidental, and in turn, the result was scored a No Contest.

==== 2017 ====
A rematch with Means eventually took place on March 11, 2017, at UFC Fight Night 106. Oliveira won the bout via submission in the second round.

Oliveira faced Ryan LaFlare on July 22, 2017, at UFC on Fox 25. He won the fight via knockout in the second round, after landing a well timed right uppercut. He was awarded his second Performance of the Night bonus award.

Oliveira faced Yancy Medeiros on December 2, 2017, at UFC 218. He lost the back-and-forth fight via TKO in the third round. Despite the loss, Oliveira earned his first Fight of the Night bonus award for the fight.

==== 2018 ====
Oliveira defeated Carlos Condit on April 14, 2018, at UFC on Fox 29, after replacing injured Matt Brown. He won the fight via a guillotine choke. This fight earned him the Performance of the Night bonus award.

Oliveira was expected to face Neil Magny on September 22, 2018, at UFC Fight Night 137. However Magny was removed from the pairing on August 22 in favor of a matchup with Santiago Ponzinibbio in November at UFC Fight Night 140, he was replaced by Carlo Pedersoli Jr. Oliveira won the fight via knockout just 39 seconds into the first round.

Oliveira faced Gunnar Nelson on December 8, 2018, at UFC 231. He lost the fight via a rear-naked choke in round two.

==== 2019 ====
Oliveira was expected to face Li Jingliang on April 27, 2019, at UFC Fight Night: Jacaré vs. Hermansson. However, it was reported on March 23, 2019, that Li was injured and was forced to pull from the bout. He was replaced by Mike Perry. Oliveira lost the back-and-forth fight by unanimous decision. The bout also earned Oliveira his second Fight of the Night bonus award.

Oliveira faced returning veteran Nicolas Dalby on September 28, 2019, at UFC Fight Night 160. He lost the fight via unanimous decision. Subsequently the decision was appealed on grounds of erroneous action by the referee.

==== 2020 ====
Oliveira was expected to face Mickey Gall on February 29, 2020, at UFC Fight Night 169. However, on December 27, 2019, the bout was pulled from the event by the UFC. Oliveira was quickly rescheduled and instead faced Max Griffin the following week at UFC 248. He won the back-and-forth fight via split decision.

Oliveira faced Peter Sobotta on July 26, 2020, at UFC Fight Night: Whittaker vs. Till. He won the fight via unanimous decision.

Oliveira faced Shavkat Rakhmonov, replacing injured Elizeu Zaleski dos Santos on October 24, 2020, at UFC 254. At the weigh-ins, Oliveira weighed in at 173 pounds, two pounds over the welterweight non-title fight limit. The bout proceeded at catchweight and he was 20% his purse, which went to his opponent Rakhmonov. Oliveira lost the fight via a guillotine choke submission in the first round.

==== 2021 ====
Oliveira was expected to face Randy Brown on February 27, 2021, at UFC Fight Night 186. However, Brown pulled out of the fight during the week leading up to the event due to undisclosed reasons, and he was replaced by promotional newcomer Ramazan Kuramagomedov. However, the bout was scrapped the day before the event when Kuramagomedov was removed due to illness. The bout between Oliveira and Brown was rescheduled and eventually took place at UFC 261 on April 24, 2021. Oliveira lost the fight via a one-armed rear naked choke in the first round.

Oliveira faced Niko Price on October 2, 2021, at UFC Fight Night 193. He lost the fight via unanimous decision.

==== 2022 ====
Oliveira faced Kevin Holland at UFC 272 on March 5, 2022. He lost the fight via technical knockout in round two.

In April 2022, it was announced that Oliveira was a free agent when his UFC contract and the UFC opted to not re-sign him.

=== Post-UFC ===
==== 2022 ====
Oliveira made his first appearance post-UFC against Michel Silva at BF Mr. Cage Fight Music Show on June 10, 2022. He lost the bout after getting choked unconscious in the second round via anaconda choke.

After picking up a quick victory on the Brazilian scene, Oliveira faced Aslambek Arsamikov on December 28. 2022 at Serbian Battle Championship 45, winning the bout via ground and pound TKO stoppage at the end of the first round.

Oliveira faced Kiefer Crosbie on April 1, 2023 at Rise Fighting Championship: Cowboy vs. Kiefer. He lost the bout via knockout in the first round.

==== 2023 ====
Oliveira faced Stefan Sekulić on June 2, 2023 at Titan FC 82/ SBC 47: Revenge. He won the bout via judo slam in the first round.

Oliveira next faced Alexander Shlemenko on July 21, 2023 at Shlemenko FC 8, getting submitted in the first round via guillotine choke.

==== 2025 ====
Oliveira was scheduled to face Gleison Tibau in the inaugural Global Fight League event on May 24, 2025 at GFL 1. However, all GFL events were cancelled indefinitely.

== Bare-knuckle boxing ==
Oliveira made his bare-knuckle boxing debut on September 20, 2024 against Igor Ionov at Russian event "REN TV Fight Club" and lost via knockout in the first round.

== Personal life ==
Oliveira is nicknamed "Cowboy" due to formerly being a rodeo bullrider.

Oliveira has ten children from various relationships.

=== Grenade attack on Christmas Eve 2018 ===
On Christmas Eve in 2018, while getting gasoline for his mother’s car in Tres Rios, Brazil, a grenade was thrown toward his direction after he noticed several family members in an altercation with heavily armed thugs. Oliveira subsequently underwent surgery to remove fragments of the grenade from his leg.

=== Incidents in May 2019 ===
According to reports, seemingly intoxicated Oliveira got into an altercation with a security guard during a party on May 24, 2019. The next morning, Oliveira showed up at his wife's apartment where he allegedly assaulted her, fleeing the scene on a motorcycle with their baby daughter. The child was found on May 26 at one of Oliveira's sister's apartments, and Oliveira had generally been understood to be reported missing until his early March 2020 arrival in Las Vegas for the UFC 248 fight card which he competed on. In an interview Oliveira denied punching his wife but did not comment on other indictments. Oliveira also said they were only having an argument and that they haven't separated: on the contrary, his wife is pregnant again.

== Championships and accomplishments ==
- Ultimate Fighting Championship
  - Performance of the Night (Three times) vs Piotr Hallmann, Ryan LaFlare and Carlos Condit
  - Fight of the Night (Two times) vs Yancy Medeiros, Mike Perry
  - UFC.com Awards
    - 2015: Ranked #9 Newcomer of the Year
    - 2017: Ranked #3 Fight of the Year vs. Yancy Medeiros
- ESPN
  - 2017 Fight of the Year vs. Yancy Medeiros at UFC 218
- MMA Sucka
  - 2017 Fight of the Year vs. Yancy Medeiros at UFC 218
- MMA Junkie
  - 2017 #2 Ranked Fight of the Year vs. Yancy Medeiros at UFC 218

== Mixed martial arts record ==
Professional record breakdown
49 matches	26 wins	20 losses
By knockout	15	7
By submission	6	9
By decision	5	4
Draws	1	
No contests	2	

Res.	Record	Opponent	Method	Event	Date	Round	Time	Location	Notes
Loss	26–20–1 (2)	Juan Pablo Varela	TKO (elbows)	Liga Monstro Combate 3	September 25, 2026	1	4:16	São Paulo, Brazil	
Loss	26–19–1 (2)	Omar Tugarev	TKO (punches)	Beazt Fight Night 1	June 13, 2026	1	2:35	Tallinn, Estonia	For the inaugural BFN Lightweight Championship.
Loss	26–18–1 (2)	Davit Lortqipanidze	Submission (anaconda choke)	Rkena FC 2	March 14, 2026	1	0:41	Tbilisi, Georgia	Return to Lightweight.
Loss	26–17–1 (2)	Miloš Janičić	TKO (punches)	FNC 26	December 20, 2025	1	1:50	Podgorica, Montenegro	Catchweight (161 lb) bout.
Win	26–16–1 (2)	Mauricio Ariel Pare	Submission (rear-naked choke)	Furthar MMA 5	September 6, 2025	1	2:10	Rio Grande, Brazil	
Loss	25–16–1 (2)	Alexander Grozin	TKO (spinning back kick to the body)	Nashe Delo 83	May 25, 2024	1	0:57	Sochi, Russia	Return to Welterweight.
Loss	25–15–1 (2)	Alexander Shlemenko	Submission (guillotine choke)	Shlemenko FC 8	July 21, 2023	1	1:59	Omsk, Russia	Middleweight debut.
Win	25–14–1 (2)	Stefan Sekulić	KO (slam)	Titan FC 82 / SBC 47	June 2, 2023	1	3:51	Novi Sad, Serbia	
Loss	24–14–1 (2)	Kiefer Crosbie	TKO (elbows and punches)	Rise FC: By. Diego Faisca	April 1, 2023	1	4:14	Porto, Portugal	
Win	24–13–1 (2)	Aslambek Arsamikov	TKO (punches)	Serbian Battle Championship 45	December 28, 2022	1	4:35	Subotica, Serbia	
Win	23–13–1 (2)	Helison Cruz	TKO (doctor stoppage)	Sul Fluminense Fight Night 9	August 13, 2022	1	0:36	Três Rios, Brazil	
Loss	22–13–1 (2)	Michel Silva	Technical Submission (anaconda choke)	Mr. Cage: Fight Music Show	June 10, 2022	2	1:51	Manaus, Brazil	For the vacant Mr. Cage Welterweight Championship.
Loss	22–12–1 (2)	Kevin Holland	TKO (elbows)	UFC 272	March 5, 2022	2	0:38	Las Vegas, Nevada, United States	
Loss	22–11–1 (2)	Niko Price	Decision (unanimous)	UFC Fight Night: Santos vs. Walker	October 2, 2021	3	5:00	Las Vegas, Nevada, United States	
Loss	22–10–1 (2)	Randy Brown	Submission (rear-naked choke)	UFC 261	April 24, 2021	1	2:50	Jacksonville, Florida, United States	
Loss	22–9–1 (2)	Shavkat Rakhmonov	Submission (guillotine choke)	UFC 254	October 24, 2020	1	4:40	Abu Dhabi, United Arab Emirates	Catchweight (173 lb) bout; Oliveira missed weight.
Win	22–8–1 (2)	Peter Sobotta	Decision (unanimous)	UFC on ESPN: Whittaker vs. Till	July 26, 2020	3	5:00	Abu Dhabi, United Arab Emirates	
Win	21–8–1 (2)	Max Griffin	Decision (split)	UFC 248	March 7, 2020	3	5:00	Las Vegas, Nevada, United States	
Loss	20–8–1 (2)	Nicolas Dalby	Decision (unanimous)	UFC Fight Night: Hermansson vs. Cannonier	September 28, 2019	3	5:00	Copenhagen, Denmark	
Loss	20–7–1 (2)	Mike Perry	Decision (unanimous)	UFC Fight Night: Jacaré vs. Hermansson	April 27, 2019	3	5:00	Sunrise, Florida, United States	Fight of the Night.
Loss	20–6–1 (2)	Gunnar Nelson	Submission (rear-naked choke)	UFC 231	December 8, 2018	2	4:17	Toronto, Ontario, Canada	
Win	20–5–1 (2)	Carlo Pedersoli Jr.	TKO (punches)	UFC Fight Night: Santos vs. Anders	September 22, 2018	1	0:39	São Paulo, Brazil	
Win	19–5–1 (2)	Carlos Condit	Submission (guillotine choke)	UFC on Fox: Poirier vs. Gaethje	April 14, 2018	2	3:17	Glendale, Arizona, United States	Performance of the Night.
Loss	18–5–1 (2)	Yancy Medeiros	TKO (punches)	UFC 218	December 2, 2017	3	2:02	Detroit, Michigan, United States	Fight of the Night.
Win	18–4–1 (2)	Ryan LaFlare	KO (punch)	UFC on Fox: Weidman vs. Gastelum	July 22, 2017	2	1:50	Uniondale, New York, United States	Performance of the Night.
Win	17–4–1 (2)	Tim Means	Submission (rear-naked choke)	UFC Fight Night: Belfort vs. Gastelum	March 11, 2017	2	2:38	Fortaleza, Brazil	
NC	16–4–1 (2)	Tim Means	NC (illegal knees)	UFC 207	December 30, 2016	1	3:33	Las Vegas, Nevada, United States	Means landed several knees to Oliveira's head, who was considered a downed opponent.
Win	16–4–1 (1)	Will Brooks	KO (punches)	UFC Fight Night: Lineker vs. Dodson	October 1, 2016	3	3:30	Portland, Oregon, United States	Lightweight bout; Oliveira missed weight (161.5 lb).
Win	15–4–1 (1)	James Moontasri	Decision (unanimous)	UFC on Fox: Holm vs. Shevchenko	July 23, 2016	3	5:00	Chicago, Illinois, United States	
Loss	14–4–1 (1)	Donald Cerrone	Submission (triangle choke)	UFC Fight Night: Cowboy vs. Cowboy	February 21, 2016	1	2:33	Pittsburgh, Pennsylvania, United States	
Win	14–3–1 (1)	Piotr Hallmann	KO (punch)	UFC Fight Night: Belfort vs. Henderson 3	November 7, 2015	3	0:51	São Paulo, Brazil	Lightweight bout. Performance of the Night.
Win	13–3–1 (1)	Joe Merritt	Decision (unanimous)	UFC Fight Night: Machida vs. Romero	June 27, 2015	3	5:00	Hollywood, Florida, United States	
Win	12–3–1 (1)	K. J. Noons	Submission (rear-naked choke)	UFC Fight Night: Condit vs. Alves	May 30, 2015	1	2:51	Goiânia, Brazil	
Loss	11–3–1 (1)	Gilbert Burns	Submission (armbar)	UFC Fight Night: Maia vs. LaFlare	March 21, 2015	3	4:14	Rio de Janeiro, Brazil	Lightweight bout.
Win	11–2–1 (1)	Joilton Santos	Decision (unanimous)	Face to Face 10	February 21, 2015	3	5:00	Itaboraí, Brazil	
Win	10–2–1 (1)	Douglas Aparecido	TKO (punches)	Watch Out Combat Show 38	October 18, 2014	1	2:52	Ubá, Brazil	Catchweight (163 lb) bout.
Win	9–2–1 (1)	Ederson Moreira	Submission (rear-naked choke)	Watch Out Combat Show 36	July 18, 2014	1	4:18	Três Rios, Brazil	Catchweight (165 lb) bout.
NC	8–2–1 (1)	Rogerio Matias	NC (overturned)	Coliseu Extreme Fight 10	May 29, 2014	1	5:00	Maceió, Brazil	For the CEF Welterweight Championship.
Win	8–2–1	Fabio Lima Ferreira	TKO (punches)	Bitetti Combat 19	February 6, 2014	1	4:26	Manaus, Brazil	
Win	7–2–1	Welton Doidao	Submission (rear-naked choke)	Watch Out Combat Show 32	December 13, 2013	3	3:44	Rio de Janeiro, Brazil	
Win	6–2–1	Thiago Macedo	TKO (punches)	Watch Out Combat Show 27	August 2, 2013	1	2:40	Rio de Janeiro, Brazil	
Draw	5–2–1	Kenedy Gualande Andrade	Draw (unanimous)	Luta Contra o Crack	June 23, 2013	3	5:00	Rio de Janeiro, Brazil	
Win	5–2	Jone Guilherme Garcia	TKO (punches)	Bitetti Combat 15	May 11, 2013	2	2:03	Rio de Janeiro, Brazil	
Loss	4–2	Wendell Oliveira	Decision (unanimous)	Watch Out Combat Show 25	April 12, 2013	3	5:00	Rio de Janeiro, Brazil	
Win	4–1	Daniel Silva	TKO (doctor stoppage)	JF Fight Evolution	October 6, 2012	1	5:00	Juiz de Fora, Brazil	
Win	3–1	Fabi Ohany	TKO (punches)	Vicosa Fight 2	August 25, 2012	1	1:43	Viçosa, Brazil	
Win	2–1	Leandro Beinrothi	TKO (knees)	Big Fights Champions	June 30, 2012	1	0:57	Nova Serrana, Brazil	
Loss	1–1	Wallace Dantas	Submission (triangle choke)	ATS Kombat 1	May 26, 2012	1	1:03	Senador Firmino, Brazil	
Win	1–0	Rodrigo Rodrigo	KO (punches)	Ervalia Fight	December 10, 2011	1	N/A	Ervália, Brazil	

== See also ==
- List of male mixed martial artists
