= Raul Castillo =

Raul Castillo may refer to:

- Raúl Castillo (actor), American actor and playwright
- Raul Castillo (fighter), American mixed martial artist
- Raúl Castillo (footballer), Mexican footballer
