= Siyar Bahadurzada =

Afghan mixed martial artist

- Born: 17 April 1984 (age 42); Kabul, Democratic Republic of Afghanistan
- Other names: The Great
- Nationality: Dutch
- Height: 5 ft 11 in (1.80 m)
- Weight: 186 lb (84 kg; 13 st 4 lb)
- Division: Light Heavyweight (2002–2003); Middleweight (2003–2010, 2017); Welterweight (2010–2016, 2018)
- Reach: 72 1/2 in (184 cm)
- Fighting out of: Deventer, Netherlands
- Team: Golden Glory; Blackzilians; Reign Training Center; Kingdom of Mayhem Jackson's Wink MMA
- Years active: 2001–2020

Mixed martial arts record
- Total: 33
- Wins: 24
- By knockout: 14
- By submission: 6
- By decision: 4
- Losses: 8
- By submission: 2
- By decision: 6
- Draws: 1

Other information
- Mixed martial arts record from Sherdog

Siyar Bahadurzada (Dari: سیار بهادرزاده; born 17 April 1984) is a retired Afghan-born Dutch mixed martial artist who competed in the Welterweight division of the Ultimate Fighting Championship, making him the first Afghan to compete in the promotion. He currently works as an instructor for Evolve MMA in Singapore. A professional competitor since 2001, he had also competed for World Victory Road, RINGS, and for Shooto, in which he held the title of Shooto Middleweight Champion.

== Background ==
Bahadurzada was born in Kabul, Afghanistan, on 17 April 1984. He and his family moved to The Netherlands in 1999.

== Mixed martial arts career ==
=== Early career ===
Bahadurzada trained under the Golden Glory association based in the Netherlands.

Siyar then signed a 4-fight contract with Strikeforce, but like many of the Golden Glory team signed to the organization, his promotional debut was delayed. Siyar gave an interview for Strikeforce, which can be heard on his Facebook profile. Bahadurzada waited for a fight from Strikeforce but never acquired a visa. He later commented in January 2011 on the scenario and expressed displeasure, saying he would never fight for the promotion.

=== Ultimate Fighting Championship ===
On 30 September 2011 Siyar announced he had signed with the UFC. He was expected to face Erick Silva on 14 January 2012 at UFC 142. However, Bahadurzada pulled out of the bout with an injury and was replaced by Carlo Prater.

Bahadurzada fought Paulo Thiago on 14 April 2012 at UFC on Fuel TV 2 and won by KO at 42 seconds of the first round, earning him Knockout of the Night honors, he became the first man to knock out Thiago.

Bahadurzada was expected to face Thiago Alves on 21 July 2012 at UFC 149, replacing an injured Yoshihiro Akiyama. However, on 1 June Alves pulled out of the bout citing an injury and was replaced by Chris Clements. Bahadurzada then himself had to withdraw from the fight due to a hand injury, and was replaced with Matthew Riddle.

Bahadurzada faced Dong Hyun Kim on 3 March 2013 at UFC on Fuel TV 8. He lost a lopsided decision after he was dominated by the grappling offense and ground and pound of Kim for all three rounds.

Bahadurzada was expected to face Robbie Lawler on 27 July 2013 at UFC on Fox 8, replacing an injured Tarec Saffiedine. However, on 11 July it was announced that Bahadurzada also pulled out of the bout and was replaced by Bobby Voelker.

Bahadurzada faced John Howard on 28 December 2013 at UFC 168. He lost the fight via unanimous decision.

After over two years away from the sport, Bahadurzada returned to face Brandon Thatch on 5 March 2016 at UFC 196. He won the fight by submission in the third round.

Bahadurzada was scheduled to face Cláudio Silva on 30 July 2016 at UFC 201. However, Silva was forced out of the bout with an injury and replaced by Jorge Masvidal. In turn, Bahadurzada pulled out of the bout on 12 July, citing an illness.

After another year away from competition Bahadurzada was expected to face Abu Azaitar on 2 September 2017 at UFC Fight Night: Struve vs. Volkov. However, Azaitar pulled out of the bout due to injury and was replaced by UFC newcomer Rob Wilkinson. Bahadurzada won the fight via TKO in the second round.

Bahadurzada faced Luan Chagas on 21 April 2018 at UFC Fight Night 128. He won the fight via knockout in the second round. This win earned him the Performance of the Night bonus.

Bahadurzada faced Curtis Millender on 29 December 2018 at UFC 232. He lost the fight via unanimous decision.

Bahadurzada was scheduled to face Nordine Taleb on 4 May 2019 at UFC Fight Night: Iaquinta vs. Cowboy. However, it was reported on 24 April 2019 that Bahadurzada pulled out of the bout citing injury, and he is replaced by newcomer Kyle Prepolec.

Bahadurzada faced Ismail Naurdiev on 28 September 2019 at UFC on ESPN+ 18. He lost the fight via unanimous decision.

In June 2020, Siyar announced that he was retiring.

== Coaching career ==
On 13 January 2020 Singapore-based mixed martial arts team Evolve MMA announced that Bahadurzada had been appointed as the new head coach.

== Championships and achievements ==
=== Mixed martial arts ===
- Ultimate Fighting Championship
  - Knockout of the Night (One time) vs. Paulo Thiago
  - Performance of the Night (One time) vs. Luan Chagas
  - UFC.com Awards
    - 2012: Ranked #5 Newcomer of the Year & Half-Year Awards: Best Newcomer of the 1HY & Ranked #4 Knockout of the Year vs. Paulo Thiago
- Professional Shooto Japan
  - Shooto Middleweight Championship (One time)
  - Two successful title defenses
- United Glory
  - 2010/2011 World Series Welterweight Tournament Winner
- Shooto Holland
  - 2003 Light Heavyweight Tournament Winner

== Mixed martial arts record ==
Professional record breakdown
33 matches	24 wins	8 losses
By knockout	13	0
By submission	7	2
By decision	4	6
Draws	1	

Res.	Record	Opponent	Method	Event	Date	Round	Time	Location	Notes
Loss	24–8–1	Ismail Naurdiev	Decision (unanimous)	UFC Fight Night: Hermansson vs. Cannonier	28 September 2019	3	5:00	Copenhagen, Denmark	
Loss	24–7–1	Curtis Millender	Decision (unanimous)	UFC 232	29 December 2018	3	5:00	Inglewood, California, United States	
Win	24–6–1	Luan Chagas	KO (front kick to the body and punch)	UFC Fight Night: Barboza vs. Lee	21 April 2018	2	2:40	Atlantic City, New Jersey, United States	Performance of the Night.
Win	23–6–1	Rob Wilkinson	TKO (punches)	UFC Fight Night: Volkov vs. Struve	2 September 2017	2	3:10	Rotterdam, Netherlands	Middleweight bout.
Win	22–6–1	Brandon Thatch	Submission (arm-triangle choke)	UFC 196	5 March 2016	3	4:11	Las Vegas, Nevada, United States	
Loss	21–6–1	John Howard	Decision (unanimous)	UFC 168	28 December 2013	3	5:00	Las Vegas, Nevada, United States	
Loss	21–5–1	Kim Dong-hyun	Decision (unanimous)	UFC on Fuel TV: Silva vs. Stann	3 March 2013	3	5:00	Saitama, Japan	
Win	21–4–1	Paulo Thiago	KO (punch)	UFC on Fuel TV: Gustafsson vs. Silva	14 April 2012	1	0:42	Stockholm, Sweden	Knockout of the Night.
Win	20–4–1	Tommy Depret	TKO (knee and punches)	United Glory: 2010/2011 World Series Finals	28 May 2011	2	4:16	Moscow, Russia	Won the United Glory Welterweight Tournament.
Win	19–4–1	John Alessio	TKO (punches)	United Glory: 2010/2011 World Series Semifinals	19 March 2011	1	1:55	Charleroi, Belgium	United Glory Welterweight Tournament Semifinal.
Win	18–4–1	Derrick Noble	TKO (punches)	United Glory: 2010/2011 World Series Quarterfinals	16 October 2010	1	1:54	Amsterdam, Netherlands	Return to Welterweight. United Glory Welterweight Tournament Quarterfinal.
Win	17–4–1	Carlos Alexandre Pereira	KO (punch)	Shooto Brasil 17	6 August 2010	1	1:34	Rio de Janeiro, Brazil	Defended the Shooto Middleweight Championship.
Win	16–4–1	Robert Jocz	Decision (majority)	Ultimate Glory 11	17 October 2009	3	5:00	Amsterdam, Netherlands	
Win	15–4–1	Leandro Batata	TKO (punches)	Shooto Brasil 13	27 August 2009	1	3:14	Fortaleza, Brazil	Defended the Shooto Middleweight Championship.
Loss	14–4–1	Jorge Santiago	Submission (heel hook)	World Victory Road Presents: Sengoku 6	1 November 2008	1	1:10	Saitama, Japan	2008 Sengoku Middleweight Grand Prix Semifinal.
Win	14–3–1	Evangelista Santos	TKO (arm injury)	World Victory Road Presents: Sengoku 5	28 September 2008	1	0:22	Tokyo, Japan	2008 Sengoku Middleweight Grand Prix Opening round.
Loss	13–3–1	Kazuo Misaki	Submission (guillotine choke)	World Victory Road Presents: Sengoku First Battle	5 March 2008	2	2:02	Tokyo, Japan	
Win	13–2–1	Nathan Schouteren	TKO (submission to punches)	Ultimate Glory 6	17 November 2007	1	4:17	Ede, Netherlands	
Win	12–2–1	Shiko Yamashita	Decision (unanimous)	Shooto: Back To Our Roots 4	15 July 2007	3	5:00	Tokyo, Japan	Won the Shooto Middleweight Championship.
Win	11–2–1	Kurt Verschueren	KO (punch)	Ultimate Glory 3	20 May 2007	1	0:55	Rotterdam, Netherlands	
Win	10–2–1	Rody Trost	TKO (punches)	International Mix Fight Association: Staredown City 2007	22 April 2007	2	3:19	Amsterdam, Netherlands	
Win	9–2–1	Rolandas Agrba	Submission (rear-naked choke)	Ultimate Glory 2	21 January 2007	1	0:26	Amsterdam, Netherlands	Return to Middleweight.
Win	8–2–1	Denis Charoykin	Decision (unanimous)	Rings Holland: Beverwijk Top Team 2006	15 October 2006	3	3:00	Beverwijk, Netherlands	
Win	7–2–1	Alexander Penao	Submission (heel hook)	Shooto Holland: Next in Line	10 September 2005	1	3:31	Barneveld, Netherlands	Welterweight debut.
Loss	6–2–1	Stefan Klever	Decision (unanimous)	Rings Holland: Born Invincible	12 December 2004	2	5:00	Utrecht, Netherlands	
Loss	6–1–1	Nathan Schouteren	Decision (unanimous)	Shooto Holland: Knockout Fight Night 3	28 March 2004	2	5:00	Vlissingen, Netherlands	Return to Light Heavyweight.
Draw	6–0–1	Patrick Vallee	Draw (split)	Shooto Holland: Knockout Fight Night 2	18 October 2003	2	5:00	Vlissingen, Netherlands	
Win	6–0	Arschak Dahabagian	Decision (unanimous)	Shooto Holland: On Tour 4	20 September 2003	2	5:00	Ede, Netherlands	Return to Middleweight.
Win	5–0	Dennis van Asselt	Submission (north-south choke)	Shooto Holland: Knockout Fight Night 1	20 April 2003	1	2:23	Goes, Netherlands	Won the Shooto Holland Light Heavyweight Tournament.
Win	4–0	Sebastiaan Rijtslag	Submission (rear-naked choke)	Shooto Holland: Knockout Fight Night 1	20 April 2003	1	2:32	Goes, Netherlands	Return to Light Heavyweight. Shooto Holland Light Heavyweight Tournament Semifinal.
Win	3–0	Hubert Veenendaal	Submission (triangle choke)	Shooto Holland: Holland vs. The World	12 April 2003	1	2:28	Culemborg, Netherlands	Middleweight debut.
Win	2–0	Mingoes Pelupessy	KO (head kick)	Shooto Holland: On Tour 1	20 September 2002	1	0:19	Culemborg, Netherlands	
Win	1–0	Marc Lange	KO (punches)	Beast of the East 4	8 March 2002	1	0:57	Zutphen, Netherlands	Light Heavyweight debut.

== See also ==
- List of male mixed martial artists
