= Erick Silva =

Brazilian mixed martial artist (born 1984)

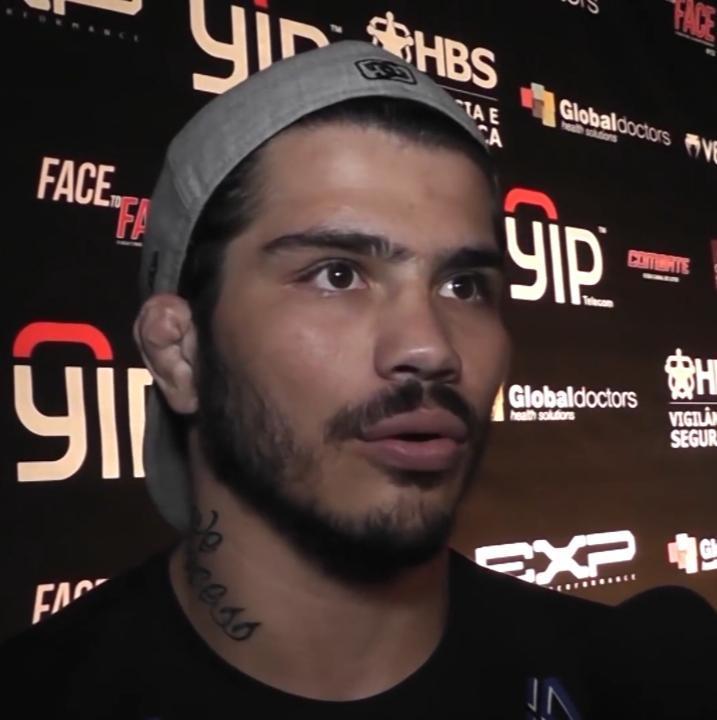
- Silva in 2015
- Born: June 21, 1984 (age 42); Vila Velha, Espírito Santo, Brazil
- Other names: A Fierce Tiger
- Height: 5 ft 11 in (180 cm)
- Weight: 170 lb (77 kg; 12 st 2 lb)
- Division: Welterweight; Middleweight
- Reach: 74 in (188 cm)
- Team: X-Gym (2005–2016); Kings MMA (2016); Tiger's Den MMA (2016–2018); Team Nogueira (2018–present)
- Rank: Black belt in Brazilian Jiu-Jitsu; Black belt in Judo
- Years active: 2005–2019

Mixed martial arts record
- Total: 32
- Wins: 20
- By knockout: 4
- By submission: 13
- By decision: 3
- Losses: 11
- By knockout: 4
- By decision: 6
- By disqualification: 1
- No contests: 1

Other information
- Mixed martial arts record from Sherdog

Erick Silva (born June 21, 1984) is a Brazilian former mixed martial artist who competed in the Welterweight division. A professional from 2005 till 2019, he competed for the Ultimate Fighting Championship, Bellator MMA, and Jungle Fight, where he was the inaugural Welterweight Champion. He is also former UFC Bantamweight fighter Gabriel Silva's big brother.

== Mixed martial arts career ==
=== Background and early career ===
Silva comes from Vila Velha, Brazil and was an X-Gym training partner for the likes of Anderson Silva, Rafael Feijao and Jacare Souza.

=== Jungle Fight Championship ===
Silva joined Jungle Fight, appearing at Jungle Fight 9 against Carlos Eduardo dos Santos. In the third and final round, Silva defeated dos Santos via rear naked choke.

At Jungle Fight 11, he defeated Igor Fernandes via unanimous decision. Silva followed that up with two further victories in the promotion.

Silva then competed in a unique fight of his career, at Jungle Fight 17, which was held outdoors. On the day of the event, the weather was clear throughout, until less than an hour before the start, when rain began to fall and never stopped. The event, which went down as one of the wettest in MMA history was not a successful one for Silva who hit his downed opponent with a knee, resulting in a no contest verdict.

Silva won his next fight, at Jungle Fight 21, via TKO (knee and punches) in the second round.

Silva then entered into the tournament for the inaugural Jungle Fight Welterweight Championship at Jungle Fight 23. Silva defeated both opponents on the same night to win the tournament. His opening round matchup was against Gil de Freitas. The opening round saw Silva utilize his striking game to take the first round, though de Freitas came back strongly in the second round with his take downs and effective ground game. In the final round, Silva caught de Freitas with a roundhouse kick to the liver, dropping him. After Silva used ground-and-pound to set up a guillotine choke, de Freitas was forced to tap out.

Silva progressed to the tournament final, where he faced the Mexican, Francisco Ayon. Ayon had just come off a split decision victory in the semi-final and he wasn't able to mount any offense against Silva, who took him down. After hitting him with several punches, Silva locked in an arm triangle choke to force the tap out with just 67 seconds on the clock. Silva therefore became the inaugural Jungle Fight Welterweight champion.

=== Ultimate Fighting Championship ===
Silva signed with the UFC in early 2011. He was expected to make his debut against Mike Swick at UFC 134. However, on August 4, 2011, it was announced that Swick had to withdraw from the bout due to a knee injury and was replaced by Luis Ramos. Silva won quickly via first round TKO due to punches.

Silva was expected to face promotional newcomer Siyar Bahadurzada on January 14, 2012, at UFC 142. However, Bahadurzada was forced out of the bout with an injury and replaced by Carlo Prater. After missing a looping right hook in the opening seconds of the fight, Silva quickly followed with a left knee to the body which effectively knocked Prater down. Prater caught Silva's knee and held on to his leg as Silva began attacking with hammer fists and punches to the head. During the attack, the referee, Mario Yamasaki, repeatedly warned Silva not to hit the back of the head. When Prater appeared to go unconscious and could no longer intelligently defend himself, Yamasaki stepped in and stopped the fight. Although Silva appeared victorious, Yamasaki disqualified Silva for strikes to the back of the head. The disqualification was later upheld by the UFC.

Silva then faced Charlie Brenneman on June 8, 2012, at UFC on FX 3. Silva won the fight with a rear-naked choke late in the first round.

Silva faced Jon Fitch on October 13, 2012, at UFC 153 in Rio de Janeiro, Brazil. After three rounds, Silva lost the fight via unanimous decision (30–27, 29–28, and 29–28). The performance earned both participants Fight of the Night honors.

Silva was expected to face Jay Hieron on February 2, 2013, at UFC 156. However, Silva pulled out of the bout citing an injury and was replaced by promotional newcomer Tyron Woodley.

Silva was expected to face John Hathaway on June 8, 2013, at UFC on Fuel TV 10. However, Hathaway was pulled from the bout in late April and replaced by Jason High, who was already scheduled on the card against Ildemar Alcantara. Silva won the fight via triangle armbar submission. The finished earned him his second Submission of the Night bonus.

Silva faced Dong Hyun Kim on October 9, 2013, at UFC Fight Night 29. Kim defeated Silva via second round KO.

Silva was expected to face returning veteran Nate Loughran on February 15, 2014, at UFC Fight Night 36. However, Loughran was forced out of the bout with an injury. Silva instead faced promotional newcomer Takenori Sato. He won the fight via TKO early in the first round. The win also earned him one of the first UFC Performance of the Night bonus awards.

Silva faced Matt Brown in the main event at UFC Fight Night 40. He lost the fight via TKO due to punches in the third round. Despite the loss, Silva was given a Fight of the Night bonus award for his performance.

Silva faced Mike Rhodes on December 20, 2014, at UFC Fight Night 58. He won the fight by technical submission in the first round. The win also earned Silva his second Performance of the Night bonus award.

Silva was expected to face Ben Saunders on March 21, 2015, at UFC Fight Night 62. However, on March 6, Saunders was forced from the fight citing an injury and was replaced by Josh Koscheck. Silva won the fight by submission in the first round.

Silva was expected to face Rick Story on June 27, 2015, at UFC Fight Night 70. However, Silva was removed from the card on June 19, after visa issues restricted his entry to the United States. In turn, Story was removed from the card as well. The bout with Story was rescheduled and was expected to take place on August 23, 2015, at UFC Fight Night 74. Subsequently, Story pulled out of the bout on August 11 citing injury and was replaced by Neil Magny. Silva lost the fight via split decision.

On March 5, 2016, Silva faced Nordine Taleb at UFC 196 at the MGM Grand in Las Vegas. He lost the fight via knockout in the second round. During the opening round, Silva extended his fist to Taleb to touch gloves in a sign of sportsmanship, but immediately landed a right hook as Taleb attempted to reciprocate it and respond to Silva's gesture. Taleb called the move dirty in a post-fight interview and stated he knew Silva was a "dirty" fighter. He received heavy criticism from fans and media and later apologized on his Twitter account, releasing a statement and admitting it was "unethical".

After the loss, Silva decided to establish his own fight team, Tiger's Den MMA, to be closer to his son, Kalleu. He brought in Andre Benkei to be his head coach. Silva was briefly scheduled to face Brandon Thatch on September 24, 2016, at UFC Fight Night 95. However, Thatch pulled out of the fight with an undisclosed injury and was subsequently replaced by Luan Chagas. He won the back and forth fight via submission in the third round. Both participants were awarded Fight of the Night honors.

Silva faced Yancy Medeiros on June 3, 2017, at UFC 212. He lost the fight via TKO in the second round.

Silva faced Jordan Mein on December 16, 2017, at UFC on Fox: Lawler vs. dos Anjos. He lost the fight by unanimous decision. The fight with Mein was the last of his contract with UFC.

=== Legacy Fighting Alliance ===
Following his departure from the UFC, Silva signed with Legacy Fighting Alliance and debuted in the main event at LFA 45 against Nick Barnes on July 20, 2018. He won the fight via submission in the first round.

=== Bellator MMA ===
On September 6, 2018, it was announced that Silva had signed a multi-fight deal with Bellator MMA. Silva was expected to make his promotional debut against Lorenz Larkin at Bellator 207, but was forced to pull out due to an injury on October 1, 2018.

Silva made his promotional debut against Yaroslav Amosov at Bellator 216 on February 16, 2019. He lost the fight via unanimous decision.

Silva faced Paul Daley at Bellator 223 on June 22, 2019. He lost the fight by unanimous decision.

Silva announced his retirement from MMA in 2022 after revealing that he had suffered a heart attack due to complications from Covid-19.

== Personal life ==
Erick and his wife Isabela have two sons.

== Championships and accomplishments ==
=== Mixed martial arts ===
- Ultimate Fighting Championship
  - Fight of the Night (Three times) vs. Jon Fitch, Matt Brown, and Luan Chagas
  - Submission of the Night (Two times) vs. Charlie Brenneman and Jason High
  - Performance of the Night (Two times) vs. Takenori Sato and Mike Rhodes
  - UFC.com Awards
    - 2014: Ranked #4 Fight of the Year vs. Matt Brown
- Jungle Fight Championship
  - Jungle Fight Welterweight Championship
  - Jungle Fight Welterweight Tournament Champion
- MMA Junkie
  - 2014 May Fight of the Month vs. Matt Brown
- Sherdog
  - 2012 Robbery of the Year
- Bleacher Report
  - 2014 #6 Ranked Fight of the Year vs. Matt Brown at UFC Fight Night: Brown vs. Silva

== Mixed martial arts record ==
Professional record breakdown
32 matches	20 wins	11 losses
By knockout	4	4
By submission	13	0
By decision	3	6
By disqualification	0	1
No contests	1	

Res.	Record	Opponent	Method	Event	Date	Round	Time	Location	Notes
Loss	20–11 (1)	Paul Daley	Decision (unanimous)	Bellator 223	June 22, 2019	3	5:00	London, England	
Loss	20–10 (1)	Yaroslav Amosov	Decision (unanimous)	Bellator 216	February 16, 2019	3	5:00	Uncasville, Connecticut, United States	
Win	20–9 (1)	Nick Barnes	Submission (armbar)	LFA 45	July 20, 2018	1	4:43	Cabazon, California, United States	
Loss	19–9 (1)	Jordan Mein	Decision (unanimous)	UFC on Fox: Lawler vs. dos Anjos	December 16, 2017	3	5:00	Winnipeg, Manitoba, Canada	
Loss	19–8 (1)	Yancy Medeiros	TKO (punches)	UFC 212	June 3, 2017	2	2:01	Rio de Janeiro, Brazil	
Win	19–7 (1)	Luan Chagas	Submission (rear-naked choke)	UFC Fight Night: Cyborg vs. Länsberg	September 24, 2016	3	3:57	Brasília, Brazil	Fight of the Night.
Loss	18–7 (1)	Nordine Taleb	KO (punch)	UFC 196	March 5, 2016	2	1:34	Las Vegas, Nevada, United States	
Loss	18–6 (1)	Neil Magny	Decision (split)	UFC Fight Night: Holloway vs. Oliveira	August 23, 2015	3	5:00	Saskatoon, Saskatchewan, Canada	
Win	18–5 (1)	Josh Koscheck	Submission (guillotine choke)	UFC Fight Night: Maia vs. LaFlare	March 21, 2015	1	4:21	Rio de Janeiro, Brazil	
Win	17–5 (1)	Mike Rhodes	Technical Submission (arm-triangle choke)	UFC Fight Night: Machida vs. Dollaway	December 20, 2014	1	1:15	Barueri, Brazil	Performance of the Night.
Loss	16–5 (1)	Matt Brown	TKO (punches)	UFC Fight Night: Brown vs. Silva	May 10, 2014	3	2:11	Cincinnati, Ohio, United States	Fight of the Night.
Win	16–4 (1)	Takenori Sato	KO (punches)	UFC Fight Night: Machida vs. Mousasi	February 15, 2014	1	0:52	Jaraguá do Sul, Brazil	Performance of the Night.
Loss	15–4 (1)	Dong Hyun Kim	KO (punch)	UFC Fight Night: Maia vs. Shields	October 9, 2013	2	3:01	Barueri, Brazil	
Win	15–3 (1)	Jason High	Submission (reverse triangle armbar)	UFC on Fuel TV: Nogueira vs. Werdum	June 8, 2013	1	1:11	Fortaleza, Brazil	Submission of the Night.
Loss	14–3 (1)	Jon Fitch	Decision (unanimous)	UFC 153	October 13, 2012	3	5:00	Rio de Janeiro, Brazil	Fight of the Night.
Win	14–2 (1)	Charlie Brenneman	Submission (rear-naked choke)	UFC on FX: Johnson vs. McCall	June 8, 2012	1	4:33	Sunrise, Florida, United States	Submission of the Night.
Loss	13–2 (1)	Carlo Prater	DQ (punches to back of head)	UFC 142	January 14, 2012	1	0:29	Rio de Janeiro, Brazil	
Win	13–1 (1)	Luis Ramos	TKO (punches)	UFC 134	August 27, 2011	1	0:40	Rio de Janeiro, Brazil	
Win	12–1 (1)	Francisco Ayon	Submission (arm-triangle choke)	Jungle Fight 23	October 30, 2010	1	1:07	Belém, Brazil	Won the inaugural Jungle Fight Welterweight Championship.
Win	11–1 (1)	Gil de Freitas	Submission (guillotine choke)	Jungle Fight 23	October 30, 2010	3	0:57	Belém, Brazil	Jungle Fight Welterweight Championship Tournament Semifinal.
Win	10–1 (1)	Jose de Ribamar	TKO (knee and punches)	Jungle Fight 21	July 31, 2010	2	3:39	Natal, Brazil	
NC	9–1 (1)	Henrique Oliveira	NC (illegal knee)	Jungle Fight 17: Vila Velha	February 27, 2010	2	3:57	Vila Velha, Brazil	Welterweight debut.
Win	9–1	Jorge Luis Bezerra	Decision (unanimous)	Jungle Fight 15	September 19, 2009	3	5:00	São Paulo, Brazil	
Win	8–1	Carlos Villamor	Submission (kneebar)	Jungle Fight 14: Ceará	May 9, 2009	2	3:38	Fortaleza, Brazil	
Win	7–1	Igor Fernandes	Decision (unanimous)	Jungle Fight 11	September 13, 2008	3	5:00	Rio de Janeiro, Brazil	
Win	6–1	Carlos Eduardo Santos	Submission (rear-naked choke)	Jungle Fight 9: Warriors	May 31, 2008	3	N/A	Rio de Janeiro, Brazil	
Win	5–1	Fabio Issa	Decision (unanimous)	Open Fight	August 4, 2007	N/A	N/A	Brazil	
Loss	4–1	Mario Neto	Decision (unanimous)	Superfight Vitoria	December 10, 2006	3	5:00	Brazil	
Win	4–0	Leandro Zumbi	Submission (arm-triangle choke)	MMA: Kombat Espirito Santo	November 25, 2006	1	3:05	Vila Velha, Brazil	
Win	3–0	Henrique Lango	Submission (rear-naked choke)	Guarafight 3	August 12, 2006	1	N/A	Guarapari, Brazil	
Win	2–0	Julian Soares	KO (punch)	Guarafight 2	January 7, 2006	1	2:30	Guarapari, Brazil	
Win	1–0	Fabiano Mastodonte	Submission (rear-naked choke)	Guarafight 1	June 4, 2005	1	2:02	Guarapari, Brazil	

== See also ==
- List of male mixed martial artists
