= UFC Fight Night: Barboza vs. Lee =

UFC mixed martial arts event in 2018

- The poster for UFC Fight Night: Barboza vs. Lee
- Promotion: Ultimate Fighting Championship
- Date: April 21, 2018
- Venue: Boardwalk Hall
- City: Atlantic City, New Jersey
- Attendance: 9,541
- Total gate: $923,720

Event chronology
UFC on Fox: Poirier vs. Gaethje	UFC Fight Night: Barboza vs. Lee	UFC 224: Nunes vs. Pennington

UFC Fight Night: Barboza vs. Lee (also known as UFC Fight Night 128) was a mixed martial arts event produced by the Ultimate Fighting Championship that was held on April 21, 2018, at Boardwalk Hall in Atlantic City, New Jersey.

== Background ==
The event marked the promotion's ninth visit to Atlantic City, the first since July 2014. The promotion last contested an event at Boardwalk Hall in June 2005.

A lightweight bout between Edson Barboza and former interim UFC Lightweight Championship challenger Kevin Lee served as the event headliner.

A light heavyweight bout between The Ultimate Fighter: Team Edgar vs. Team Penn light heavyweight winner Corey Anderson and Patrick Cummins was originally scheduled for UFC 217. However, Cummins pulled out due to a staph infection. The bout took place at this event.

Paulo Costa was expected to face Uriah Hall at the event. However, Costa pulled out of the fight in mid-March with an arm injury. In turn, promotion officials elected to pull Hall from the event and reschedule the pairing for a future event.

Augusto Mendes was pulled from a bout against Merab Dvalishvili due to a potential Anti-Doping Policy violation stemming from an out-of-competition sample collected on March 7, 2018. He was replaced by promotional newcomer Ricky Simón.

Former WSOF Flyweight Champion Magomed Bibulatov was expected to face Ulka Sasaki, but he pulled out a day before the event, citing back injury and the bout was cancelled.

At the weigh-ins, Lee weighed in at 157 pounds, one pound over the lightweight non-title fight upper limit of 156 pounds. As a result, the bout proceeded at catchweight and Lee was fined 20% of his purse which will go to his opponent Barboza. Aspen Ladd weighed in at 137.8 pounds, 1.8 pounds over the bantamweight non-title fight upper limit of 136 pounds. Ladd supposedly offered Leslie Smith an additional $5,000 on top of her 20% purse deduction. However, the fight was removed from the card after Smith refused to fight at catchweight. Subsequently, the UFC paid Smith her show and win money but then released her from the promotion.

== Results ==
Main card (Fox Sports 1)
Weight class				Method	Round	Time	Notes
Catchweight (157 lb)	Kevin Lee	def.	Edson Barboza	TKO (doctor stoppage)	5	2:18
Featherweight	Frankie Edgar	def.	Cub Swanson	Decision (unanimous) (30–27, 30–27, 30–27)	3	5:00
Heavyweight	Justin Willis	def.	Chase Sherman	Decision (unanimous) (29–28, 29–28, 29–28)	3	5:00
Middleweight	David Branch	def.	Thiago Santos	KO (punches)	1	2:30
Bantamweight	Aljamain Sterling	def.	Brett Johns	Decision (unanimous) (30–27, 30–27, 30–27)	3	5:00
Lightweight	Dan Hooker	def.	Jim Miller	KO (knee)	1	3:00
Preliminary card (Fox Sports 1)
Welterweight	Ryan LaFlare	def.	Alex Garcia	Decision (unanimous) (30–27, 30–27, 30–27)	3	5:00
Bantamweight	Ricky Simón	def.	Merab Dvalishvili	Technical Submission (guillotine choke)	3	5:00
Welterweight	Siyar Bahadurzada	def.	Luan Chagas	KO (body kick and punch)	2	2:40
Light Heavyweight	Corey Anderson	def.	Patrick Cummins	Decision (unanimous) (30–26, 30–26, 30–27)	3	5:00
Preliminary card (UFC Fight Pass)
Welterweight	Anthony Rocco Martin	def.	Keita Nakamura	Decision (unanimous) (30–27, 30–27, 30–27)	3	5:00

== Bonus awards ==
The following fighters were awarded $50,000 bonuses:

- Fight of the Night: Ricky Simón vs. Merab Dvalishvili
- Performance of the Night: David Branch and Siyar Bahadurzada

== See also ==
- List of UFC events
- List of current UFC fighters
- 2018 in UFC
