= Francisco Trinaldo =

Brazilian mixed martial arts fighter

- Born: August 24, 1978 (age 48); Amarante, Piauí, Brazil
- Other names: Massaranduba
- Height: 5 ft 8 in (1.73 m)
- Weight: 170 lb (77 kg; 12 st)
- Division: Middleweight; Welterweight; Lightweight
- Reach: 70 in (178 cm)
- Fighting out of: Brasília, Federal District, Brazil
- Team: Evolução Thai; Constrictor Team
- Trainer: Striking: André Dida; Jiu-Jitsu: Sérgio Moraes
- Rank: Black belt in Kickboxing; Brown belt in Brazilian Jiu-Jitsu
- Years active: 2006–present

Kickboxing record
- Total: 14
- Wins: 12
- Losses: 2

Mixed martial arts record
- Total: 38
- Wins: 29
- By knockout: 10
- By submission: 5
- By decision: 14
- Losses: 9
- By submission: 3
- By decision: 6

Other information
- Mixed martial arts record from Sherdog

Francisco Trinaldo (born August 24, 1978) is a Brazilian mixed martial artist who competed in the welterweight division of the Ultimate Fighting Championship. A professional since 2006, he has also competed for Jungle Fight in his native Brazil, where he is the former Lightweight Champion, and was a competitor on The Ultimate Fighter: Brazil.

== Mixed martial arts career ==
=== Background ===
Trinaldo began with an amateur career, compiling a record of 6–1 in mixed martial arts. He is also a three-time Brasília State Kickboxing Champion, and began kickboxing when he was 23 years old before transitioning into mixed martial arts, holding a record of 12–1. Trinaldo is an ex-training partner of Paulo Thiago and Rani Yahya.

He spends most of his training time at the Evolução Thai, where he garnered considerable recognition, causing Sherdog.com to list him in August 2010 as their top prospect in MMA.

Trinaldo is regarded as being hampered by financial issues that prevented his rise further in the sport. Coming from a disadvantaged background, Trinaldo struggled and has been quoted as saying "Sometimes I can’t train because I don’t have money to catch a bus and go to the academy."

His nickname came from the character of the Brazilian TV show Casseta & Planeta Urgente played by the Brazilian comedian Cláudio Manoel named Massaranduba, who had his same quarrelsome attitude.

=== Early career ===
Trinaldo's professional career began in the Fight Club Tournament promotion, where he won his opening bout via unanimous decision. This was followed by a TKO due to corner stoppage.

Trinaldo then fought twice more, securing a submission victory via arm-triangle choke and another victory via TKO due to punches and soccer kicks after 12 seconds.

=== Bitetti Combat and Jungle Fight ===
Trinaldo's success continued when he joined Bitetti Combat in February 2010. Facing Luiz Firmino at Bitetti Combat 6, Trinaldo dominated, locking in a kneebar on his experienced opponent and forcing the tapout with ease.

Following this, Trinaldo joined the Jungle Fight Championship promotion and faced another experienced opponent in Flavio Alvaro. Late in the second round, Trinaldo secured a TKO victory due to punches, taking his professional record to 6-0.

Trinaldo suffered his first professional loss in September 2010, at the hands of future UFC fighter Iuri Alcântara via second round armbar.

Trinaldo then went on a four-fight winning streak in the Jungle Fight promotion with victories over Bruno Lobato, Joao Paulo, Derrick Burnsed and Adriano Martins, with the latter one earning him the Jungle Fight Lightweight belt.

=== The Ultimate Fighter ===
In March 2012, Trinaldo appeared as a fighter on The Ultimate Fighter: Brazil. He entered in the competition to fight in the Middleweight tournament. In the opening elimination fight, he defeated Charles Maicon by TKO in round 1 to get into the TUF house. He was then defeated by Thiago Perpétuo.

=== Ultimate Fighting Championship ===
Trinaldo competed on the live finale card which took place at UFC 147 on June 23, 2012, in Belo Horizonte, Brazil against Delson Heleno. Trinaldo won in his UFC debut via TKO in the first round. After the fight he expressed his desire to fight at 155 which is his natural weight.

Trinaldo returned to the lightweight division and faced Gleison Tibau on October 13, 2012, at UFC 153. He lost the fight via unanimous decision.

Trinaldo defeated C.J. Keith on January 19, 2013, at UFC on FX 7, locking up an arm-triangle choke early in the second round.

For his fourth UFC fight, Trinaldo faced Mike Rio on May 18, 2013, at UFC on FX 8. He won the fight via submission in the first round.

Trinaldo faced promotional newcomer Piotr Hallmann on September 4, 2013, at UFC Fight Night 28. After dominating the first round and hurting Hallmann twice with body kicks, Trinaldo lost the fight via kimura submission in the second round.

Trinaldo faced Jesse Ronson at UFC Fight Night 36. He won the fight via split decision.

Trinaldo faced Michael Chiesa on May 24, 2014, at UFC 173. He lost the fight via unanimous decision.

Trinaldo faced Leandro Silva at UFC Fight Night 51 on September 13, 2014. He won the fight by unanimous decision.

Trinaldo faced Akbarh Arreola on March 21, 2015, at UFC Fight Night 62. He won the fight by unanimous decision.

Trinaldo replaced an injured Gilbert Burns and fought Norman Parke on May 30, 2015, at UFC Fight Night 67. He won the fight by split decision.

Trinaldo faced Chad Laprise on August 23, 2015, at UFC Fight Night 74. He won the fight via TKO in the first round, after knocking his opponent down with a left hand and finishing with ground strikes, handing Laprise his first loss of his MMA career.

Trinaldo faced Ross Pearson on January 17, 2016, at UFC Fight Night 81. He won the fight via unanimous decision.

Trinaldo next faced Yancy Medeiros on May 14, 2016, at UFC 198. He won the fight via unanimous decision. Both participants were awarded Fight of the Night honors.

Trinaldo faced Paul Felder on September 24, 2016, at UFC Fight Night 95. He won the fight via TKO in the third round.

Trinaldo faced Kevin Lee on March 11, 2017, at UFC Fight Night 106. After a back-and-forth first round, Trinaldo lost the fight via submission in the second round.

Trinaldo faced Jim Miller on October 28, 2017, at UFC Fight Night 119. He won the fight by unanimous decision.

Trinaldo faced James Vick on February 18, 2018, at UFC Fight Night: Cowboy vs. Medeiros. He lost the fight via unanimous decision.

Trinaldo faced Evan Dunham on September 22, 2018, at UFC Fight Night 137, He won the fight via knockout in the second round due to a knee to the body.

Trinaldo was originally set to face Islam Makhachev on January 26, 2019, at UFC 233, however, Makhachev was forced out of the bout due to undisclosed reasons and was replaced by Alexander Hernandez. In turn, Hernandez was pulled from that fight in favor of a bout with Donald Cerrone a week earlier at UFC Fight Night: Cejudo vs. Dillashaw. Subsequently, Trinaldo was pulled from the card entirely.

Trinaldo was scheduled to face Carlos Diego Ferreira on May 11, 2019, at UFC 237. However, Ferreira was forced out of the bout on weigh-in day as he was deemed medically unfit due to a weight cutting issue. As a result, the bout was cancelled.

Trinaldo faced Alexander Hernandez on July 20, 2019, at UFC on ESPN 4. He lost the fight via controversial unanimous decision, as 11 of 13 media outlets scoring the bout in favor of Trinaldo.

Trinaldo faced Bobby Green on November 16, 2019, at UFC Fight Night 164. He won the fight via unanimous decision.

Trinaldo faced John Makdessi on March 14, 2020, at UFC Fight Night 170. He won the fight via unanimous decision.

Trinaldo faced Jai Herbert on July 26, 2020, at UFC on ESPN 14. At the weigh-ins, Trinaldo weighed in at 160 pounds, four pounds over the lightweight non-title fight limit. His bout proceeded at a catchweight and he was fined 30% of his purse, which went to his opponent Jai Herbert. He won the fight via technical knockout in round three.

==== Move up to welterweight ====
After missing weight for the first time in his UFC career, Trinaldo moved up to welterweight and faced Muslim Salikhov at UFC Fight Night 189 on June 5, 2021. He lost the fight via unanimous decision.

Trinaldo faced Dwight Grant on October 23, 2021, at UFC Fight Night 196. He won the fight via split decision.

Trinaldo faced Danny Roberts on May 7, 2022, at UFC 274. He won the bout via unanimous decision.

Trinaldo faced Randy Brown on October 1, 2022, at UFC Fight Night 211. He lost the bout via unanimous decision.

Trinaldo was released by the UFC in early January 2023 after the loss.

=== Gamebred Bareknuckle MMA ===
In his first fight since his UFC release, Trinaldo faced Sasha Palatnikov at Gamebred Bareknuckle MMA 6 on November 10, 2023. He won the fight via TKO due to injury in the first round.

==== Global Fight League ====
On December 11, 2024, it was announced that Trinaldo was eligible to be drafted in the Global Fight League. However, he was not drafted for the 2025 season. In turn, in April 2025, it was reported that all GFL events were cancelled indefinitely.

== Championships and accomplishments ==
=== Mixed martial arts ===
- Ultimate Fighting Championship
  - Fight of the Night (One time) vs. Yancy Medeiros
  - UFC.com Awards
    - 2015: Ranked #9 Upset of the Year vs. Chad Laprise
- Jungle Fight
  - Jungle Fight Lightweight Championship (One time)

=== Kickboxing ===
- Brasília State Kickboxing Champion (Three times)

== Mixed martial arts record ==
Professional record breakdown
38 matches	29 wins	9 losses
By knockout	10	0
By submission	5	3
By decision	14	6

Res.	Record	Opponent	Method	Event	Date	Round	Time	Location	Notes
Win	29–9	Sasha Palatnikov	TKO (knee injury)	Gamebred Fighting Championship 6	November 10, 2023	1	1:55	Biloxi, Mississippi, United States	Bare knuckle MMA.
Loss	28–9	Randy Brown	Decision (unanimous)	UFC Fight Night: Dern vs. Yan	October 1, 2022	3	5:00	Las Vegas, Nevada, United States	
Win	28–8	Danny Roberts	Decision (unanimous)	UFC 274	May 7, 2022	3	5:00	Phoenix, Arizona, United States	
Win	27–8	Dwight Grant	Decision (split)	UFC Fight Night: Costa vs. Vettori	October 23, 2021	3	5:00	Las Vegas, Nevada, United States	
Loss	26–8	Muslim Salikhov	Decision (unanimous)	UFC Fight Night: Rozenstruik vs. Sakai	June 5, 2021	3	5:00	Las Vegas, Nevada, United States	Welterweight debut.
Win	26–7	Jai Herbert	TKO (punch)	UFC on ESPN: Whittaker vs. Till	July 26, 2020	3	1:30	Abu Dhabi, United Arab Emirates	Catchweight (160 lb) bout; Trinaldo missed weight.
Win	25–7	John Makdessi	Decision (unanimous)	UFC Fight Night: Lee vs. Oliveira	March 14, 2020	3	5:00	Brasília, Brazil	
Win	24–7	Bobby Green	Decision (unanimous)	UFC Fight Night: Błachowicz vs. Jacaré	November 16, 2019	3	5:00	São Paulo, Brazil	
Loss	23–7	Alexander Hernandez	Decision (unanimous)	UFC on ESPN: dos Anjos vs. Edwards	July 20, 2019	3	5:00	San Antonio, Texas, United States	
Win	23–6	Evan Dunham	KO (knee to the body)	UFC Fight Night: Santos vs. Anders	September 22, 2018	2	4:10	São Paulo, Brazil	
Loss	22–6	James Vick	Decision (unanimous)	UFC Fight Night: Cowboy vs. Medeiros	February 18, 2018	3	5:00	Austin, Texas, United States	
Win	22–5	Jim Miller	Decision (unanimous)	UFC Fight Night: Brunson vs. Machida	October 28, 2017	3	5:00	São Paulo, Brazil	
Loss	21–5	Kevin Lee	Submission (rear-naked choke)	UFC Fight Night: Belfort vs. Gastelum	March 11, 2017	2	3:12	Fortaleza, Brazil	
Win	21–4	Paul Felder	TKO (doctor stoppage)	UFC Fight Night: Cyborg vs. Länsberg	September 24, 2016	3	2:25	Brasília, Brazil	
Win	20–4	Yancy Medeiros	Decision (unanimous)	UFC 198	May 14, 2016	3	5:00	Curitiba, Brazil	Fight of the Night.
Win	19–4	Ross Pearson	Decision (unanimous)	UFC Fight Night: Dillashaw vs. Cruz	January 17, 2016	3	5:00	Boston, Massachusetts, United States	
Win	18–4	Chad Laprise	TKO (punches)	UFC Fight Night: Holloway vs. Oliveira	August 23, 2015	1	2:43	Saskatoon, Saskatchewan, Canada	
Win	17–4	Norman Parke	Decision (split)	UFC Fight Night: Condit vs. Alves	May 30, 2015	3	5:00	Goiânia, Brazil	
Win	16–4	Akbarh Arreola	Decision (unanimous)	UFC Fight Night: Maia vs. LaFlare	March 21, 2015	3	5:00	Rio de Janeiro, Brazil	
Win	15–4	Leandro Silva	Decision (unanimous)	UFC Fight Night: Bigfoot vs. Arlovski	September 13, 2014	3	5:00	Brasília, Brazil	
Loss	14–4	Michael Chiesa	Decision (unanimous)	UFC 173	May 24, 2014	3	5:00	Las Vegas, Nevada, United States	
Win	14–3	Jesse Ronson	Decision (split)	UFC Fight Night: Machida vs. Mousasi	February 15, 2014	3	5:00	Jaraguá do Sul, Brazil	
Loss	13–3	Piotr Hallmann	Submission (kimura)	UFC Fight Night: Teixeira vs. Bader	September 4, 2013	2	3:50	Belo Horizonte, Brazil	
Win	13–2	Mike Rio	Submission (arm-triangle choke)	UFC on FX: Belfort vs. Rockhold	May 18, 2013	1	3:08	Jaraguá do Sul, Brazil	
Win	12–2	C.J. Keith	Submission (arm-triangle choke)	UFC on FX: Belfort vs. Bisping	January 19, 2013	2	1:50	São Paulo, Brazil	
Loss	11–2	Gleison Tibau	Decision (unanimous)	UFC 153	October 13, 2012	3	5:00	Rio de Janeiro, Brazil	Return to Lightweight.
Win	11–1	Delson Heleno	TKO (punches)	UFC 147	June 23, 2012	1	4:21	Belo Horizonte, Brazil	Middleweight debut.
Win	10–1	Adriano Martins	Decision (majority)	Jungle Fight 30	July 30, 2011	3	5:00	Belém, Brazil	Won the Jungle Fight Lightweight Championship.
Win	9–1	Derrick Burnsed	KO (punch)	Jungle Fight 28	May 21, 2011	2	0:52	Rio de Janeiro, Brazil	Won the Interim Jungle Fight Lightweight Championship.
Win	8–1	João Paulo Rodrigues	Decision (unanimous)	Jungle Fight 25	February 19, 2011	3	5:00	Vila Velha, Brazil	
Win	7–1	Bruno Lobato	Submission (anaconda choke)	Jungle Fight 24	December 18, 2010	1	2:24	Rio de Janeiro, Brazil	
Loss	6–1	Iuri Alcântara	Submission (armbar)	Jungle Fight 22	September 18, 2010	2	2:24	São Paulo, Brazil	Jungle Fight Lightweight Grand Prix Semifinal.
Win	6–0	Flavio Alvaro	TKO (punches)	Jungle Fight 20	May 22, 2010	2	4:01	São Paulo, Brazil	Jungle Fight Lightweight Grand Prix Semifinal.
Win	5–0	Luiz Firmino	Submission (kneebar)	Bitetti Combat MMA 6	February 25, 2010	1	2:03	Brasília, Brazil	
Win	4–0	Junior Lava	TKO (punches and soccer kicks)	Norofight 1	August 8, 2009	1	0:12	Unaí, Brazil	
Win	3–0	Marcone Bezerra	Submission (arm-triangle choke)	Hero's The Jungle 2	April 7, 2008	1	N/A	Manaus, Brazil	Lightweight debut.
Win	2–0	Vinicius Dohrer	TKO (corner stoppage)	Fight Club Tournament 3	August 18, 2006	2	N/A	Taguatinga, Brazil	
Win	1–0	Edval Pedroso	Decision (unanimous)	Fight Club Tournament 2	May 13, 2006	3	5:00	Taguatinga, Brazil	

=== Mixed martial arts exhibition record ===
Exhibition record breakdown		
2 matches	1 win	1 loss
By knockout	1	1

Res.	Record	Opponent	Method	Event	Date	Round	Time	Location	Notes
Loss	1–1	Thiago Perpétuo	TKO (retirement)	The Ultimate Fighter: Brazil	May 13, 2012 (airdate)	1	5:00	São Paulo, Brazil	The Ultimate Fighter: Brazil Preliminary Round.
Win	1–0	Charles Maicon	TKO (punches)	The Ultimate Fighter: Brazil	March 25, 2012 (airdate)	1	0:00	São Paulo, Brazil	The Ultimate Fighter: Brazil Elimination Round.

== See also ==
- List of male mixed martial artists
