= Gilbert Burns =

Brazilian-American mixed martial artist (born 1986)

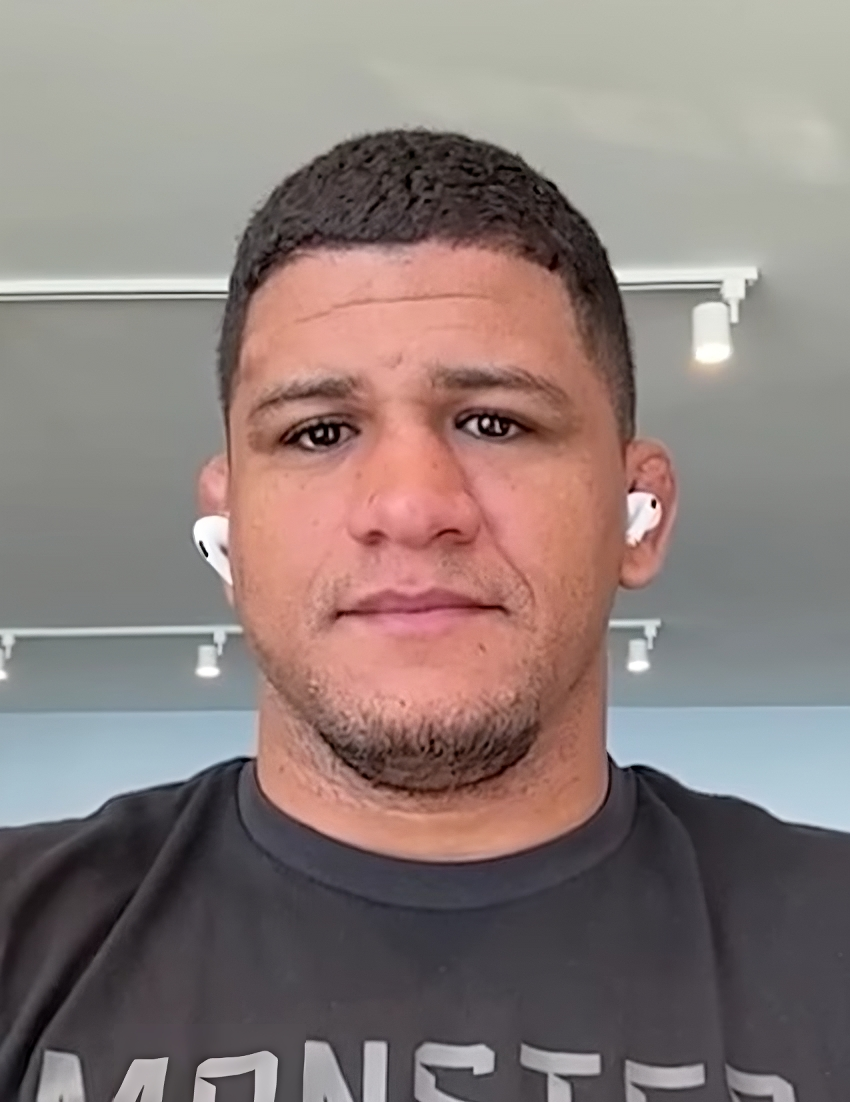
- Burns in 2024
- Born: Gilbert Alexander Pontes Burns; 20 July 1986 (age 40); Niterói, Rio de Janeiro, Brazil
- Other names: Durinho
- Height: 5 ft 10 in (178 cm)
- Weight: 170 lb (77 kg; 12 st 2 lb)
- Division: Lightweight (2012–2019); Welterweight (2014, 2019–2026)
- Reach: 71 in (180 cm)
- Style: Brazilian jiu-jitsu
- Stance: Orthodox
- Fighting out of: Boca Raton, Florida, U.S.
- Team: Xtreme Couture (2011–2012); Blackzilians (2012–2016); Kill Cliff FC (2017–present)
- Trainer: Henri Hooft (striking); Neil Melanson (Catch wrestling)
- Rank: 3rd degree black belt in Brazilian Jiu-Jitsu (Note: under Rafael "Fofitio" Barros)
- Years active: 2012–2026

Mixed martial arts record
- Total: 32
- Wins: 22
- By knockout: 6
- By submission: 9
- By decision: 7
- Losses: 10
- By knockout: 5
- By decision: 5

Other information
- Notable relatives: Herbert Burns (brother)
- Notable students: Mikey Musumeci
- Mixed martial arts record from Sherdog

Gilbert Alexander Pontes Burns (born 20 July 1986) is a Brazilian and American former professional mixed martial artist and submission grappler. He competed in the Welterweight division of the Ultimate Fighting Championship (UFC) where he was a challenger for the UFC Welterweight championship in February 2021.

Burns is an IBJJF World Jiu-Jitsu Champion (gi and no-gi), CBJJ Brazilian Champion, UAEJJF World Pro Champion, European Open medallist, and ADCC Submission Fighting World Championship medallist.

He is the older brother of former UFC fighter Herbert Burns.

== Background ==
Burns was born in Niterói, as one of three brothers. During their childhood, he and his younger brother, former UFC fighter Herbert Burns, suffered from severe attacks of asthmatic bronchitis. Upon medical recommendation to help manage the condition, they began practicing sports at the age of four, getting their first martial arts experience through karate sessions in their backyard.

Their definitive transition to Brazilian jiu-jitsu happened in 1998, after the brothers found a gi in the trunk of a car belonging to one of their father's clients. Their father worked as an upholsterer, and the car's owner, a coach named Luiz Carlos, offered the three boys three months of free BJJ lessons in exchange for repairing his car seats. Due to the family's severe financial struggles at the time, the eldest brother, Frederick, gave up his competitive career in 2003 to work and help support the household. He would later become a combat diver for the Brazilian Navy's Special Operations.

Burns began his formal training at the Associação Oriente Academy in Niterói. His famous nickname, "Durinho", originated when the brothers started training at the Nova União headquarters in Rio de Janeiro. Frederick was known as "Todo Duro" (roughly translated as "All Stiff")—a moniker given to him by veteran Vitor "Shaolin" Ribeiro due to his stiff movement style. Because Gilbert was the younger brother but still displayed remarkable toughness during sparring, "Shaolin" dubbed him "Durinho" (the diminutive form, meaning "Little Tough Guy").

At the age of 18, Burns secured his first sponsorship, which allowed him to cover his training expenses and financially assist his family. Initially, he enrolled in college to study Physical education, but dropped out in 2007 to focus entirely on his competitive jiu-jitsu career. He subsequently relocated to Rio Claro in the state's countryside. During this period, he struggled to make rent and dealt with recurring bronchitis attacks, but was ultimately persuaded by his older brother to not abandon the sport.

== Grappling career ==
He trained with Nova União until the 2007 World Championship, where he came in second place.

In 2009, Burns became recognized when he won the silver medal at the World Jiu-Jitsu Championship.

In 2010, Burns attained a high level of international success competing worldwide. He reached the semifinals of the European Open in January; he defeated heavy favorite Celso Venicius at the World Pro Cup trials; he won the World Cup finals in Abu Dhabi against Claudio Mattos, and he won the Brazilian Nationals in May.

In 2011, Burns achieved his highest recognition as he won the gold medal in the 2011 World Brazilian Jiu-Jitsu Championships.

In 2015, Burns won bronze at Abu Dhabi Submission Wrestling championships (ADCC).

In November 2020, Burns challenged Nate Diaz to a grappling match on an upcoming Submission Underground event, but the match didn't come to fruition.

Burns faced Rafael Lovato Jr. in the main event of Who's Number One on 30 April 2021 and won a unanimous decision.

He then fought against Lucas Barbosa in the main event of BJJ Stars 7 on 6 November 2021. Burns lost by submission after being caught in a rear-naked choke.

Burns faced Horlando Monteiro in his UFC BJJ debut at UFC BJJ 9 on June 4, 2026. He won the match via rear-naked choke.

== Mixed martial arts career ==
=== Early career ===
After winning the 2011 World Brazilian Jiu-Jitsu Championships, Burns decided to make mixed martial arts his main focus and made his professional debut in January 2012.

=== The Ultimate Fighter: Brazil ===
In 2012, Burns was chosen by UFC fighter Vitor Belfort to be the head grappling coach for Team Vitor on the first season of The Ultimate Fighter: Brazil.

=== Ultimate Fighting Championship ===
==== 2014 ====
Burns made his debut on 26 July 2014 at UFC on Fox 12, replacing an injured Viscardi Andrade against promotional newcomer Andreas Stahl. He won the fight by unanimous decision.

===== Return to Lightweight =====
Burns faced promotional newcomer Christos Giagos in a lightweight bout on 25 October 2014 at UFC 179. He won the bout via submission in the first round. The win also earned him his first Performance of the Night bonus award.

==== 2015 ====
Burns was expected to face Josh Thomson on 21 March 2015 at UFC Fight Night 62. However, on 26 February, Thomson pulled out of the fight with an undisclosed injury, and was replaced by Alex Oliveira. After arguably dropping the first two rounds, Burns rallied to win the fight via submission in the third round. This win also earned him his second straight Performance of the Night bonus.

Burns was expected to face Norman Parke on 30 May 2015 at UFC Fight Night 67. However, Burns pulled out of the fight due to injury in late April and was replaced by Francisco Trinaldo.

Burns faced Rashid Magomedov at UFC Fight Night 77 on 7 November 2015. After getting knocked down multiple times during the bout, he lost the first fight via unanimous decision, marking his first loss in his MMA career.

==== 2016 ====
Burns next faced Łukasz Sajewski on 7 July 2016 at UFC Fight Night 90. He won the fight via submission in the closing seconds of the first round.

Burns faced Michel Prazeres on 24 September 2016 at UFC Fight Night 95. He lost the fight via unanimous decision.

==== 2017 ====
Burns was scheduled to meet Paul Felder on 11 February 2017 at UFC 208. However, Burns pulled out of the fight in mid-January citing injury.

Burns faced Jason Saggo on 16 September 2017 at UFC Fight Night 116. He won the fight via knockout in the second round.

In the beginning of November 2017, Burns stated he had signed a new, four-fight contract with UFC.

==== 2018 ====
Burns was scheduled to face Olivier Aubin-Mercier on 24 February 2018 at UFC on Fox 28. However, on 21 February 2018, both Burns and Aubin-Mercier were pulled from the card, as promotional medical team deemed Burns would be unsafe to meet lightweight upper limit of 156 Ibs limit upon his arrival at the fight week.

Burns was linked to a fight with Lando Vannata on 14 April 2018 at UFC on Fox 29. However, the pairing never materialized as Vannata was unable to accept the fight for this date/event as he was still rehabilitating a recent arm injury, instead Burns was scheduled to face newcomer Dan Moret in this event. He won the fight via knockout one minute into the second round.

Burns faced Dan Hooker on 7 July 2018 at UFC 226. He lost the fight via knockout in the first round, being finished for the first time in his MMA career.

The bout with Olivier Aubin-Mercier was rescheduled and eventually took place on 8 December 2018 at UFC 231. Burns won the fight by unanimous decision.

==== 2019 ====
Burns was expected to face returning veteran Eric Wisely on 27 April 2019 at UFC Fight Night 150. However, it was reported on 18 April that Wisely pulled out of the bout, citing injury. He was replaced by newcomer Mike Davis. Burns won the fight via rear-naked choke submission in the second round.

Burns returned to the welterweight facing Alexey Kunchenko on 10 August 2019 at UFC Fight Night 156, replacing injured Laureano Staropoli. He won the fight via unanimous decision, marking Kunchenko's first loss in his career.

Burns stepped in as a late replacement to face Gunnar Nelson, on 28 September 2019 at UFC Fight Night 160. He won the fight via unanimous decision.

==== 2020 ====
As the first fight of his new, four-fight contract, Burns faced Demian Maia on 14 March 2020 at UFC Fight Night 170. He won the fight via technical knockout in round one. This win earned him the Performance of the Night award.

Burns faced Tyron Woodley on 30 May 2020 in the main event of UFC on ESPN 9. After knocking Woodley down in the first round and mostly dominating the former champion throughout the fight, Burns won the fight via unanimous decision. This win also earned him his fourth Performance of the Night award.

==== 2021 ====
As the first bout of his new five-fight contract, Burns was scheduled to face Kamaru Usman for the UFC Welterweight Championship on 11 July 2021 at UFC 251. However, on 3 July 2020, it was revealed that Burns tested positive for COVID-19, and he was subsequently removed from the card, and replaced by Jorge Masvidal. The title bout with Usman was rescheduled for 12 December 2021, at UFC 256. However, on 5 October 2020, it was reported Usman pulled from his bout, citing more time needed to recover from undisclosed injuries and the bout was postponed to an unknown future date. The bout with Usman took place on 13 February 2021 at UFC 258. Burns knocked Usman down early in the fight, but went on to lose the bout via technical knockout in the third round.

Burns faced Stephen Thompson on 10 July 2021 at UFC 264. He won the fight via unanimous decision.

==== 2022 ====
Burns faced Khamzat Chimaev at UFC 273 on 9 April 2022. He lost the bout via unanimous decision. The fight was awarded the Fight of the Night award. Dana White later announced that Burns would get his win bonus for the fight, despite the loss.

==== 2023 ====
Burns faced Neil Magny on 21 January 2023 at UFC 283. He won the fight via an arm-triangle choke submission in the first round.

Burns faced Jorge Masvidal on 8 April 2023 at UFC 287. He won the bout via unanimous decision.

Burns faced Belal Muhammad on 6 May 2023 at UFC 288. He lost the bout by unanimous decision.

==== 2024 ====
Burns faced Jack Della Maddalena on 9 March 2024 at UFC 299. He lost the bout via knockout in round three.

Burns faced Sean Brady on 7 September 2024 at UFC Fight Night 242 in the main event. He lost the fight by unanimous decision.

==== 2025 ====
Burns was scheduled to face undefeated prospect Michael Morales on 12 April 2025, at UFC 314. However, the bout was moved to 10 May 2025 at UFC 315 for unknown reasons. In turn, the bout against Morales was moved to serve as the main event on 17 May 2025 at UFC Fight Night 256. Burns lost the fight by technical knockout in the first round.

==== 2026 ====
Burns faced Mike Malott in the main event on 18 April 2026, at UFC Fight Night 273. He lost the fight by technical knockout in the third round and laid down his gloves after the bout signaling his retirement from mixed martial arts.

== Freestyle Wrestling ==
Burns faced Khamzat Chimaev on 18 September 2026 at RAF 13. He lost the match by technical fall in the second round.

== Brazilian jiu-jitsu lineage ==
Mitsuyo "Count Koma" Maeda → Carlos Gracie, Sr. → Carlson Gracie → André Pederneiras → Rafael Barros → Gilbert Burns

== Championships and accomplishments ==
=== Submission grappling ===
- 3rd Place ADCC Submission Fighting World Championship (2015)

=== Brazilian jiu-jitsu ===
Main Achievements (black belt):

- IBJJF World Champion (2011)
- IBJJF World No-Gi Champion (2010, 2013)
- CBJJ Brazilian Nationals Champion (2010)
- UAEJJF Abu Dhabi World Pro Champion (2010)
- 2nd place IBJJF World Championship (2009)
- 3rd Place IBJJF European Open (2009)

Main Achievements (lower belts):

- 2nd place IBJJF World Championship (2007/2006 brown)
- 2nd place CBJJ Brazilian Nationals (2007 brown)

=== Mixed martial arts ===
- Ultimate Fighting Championship
  - Performance of the Night (Four times) vs. Christos Giagos, Alex Oliveira, Demian Maia and Tyron Woodley
  - Fight of the Night (One time) vs. Khamzat Chimaev
  - Third most armbar submission wins in UFC history (3)
  - UFC Honors Awards
    - 2022: President's Choice Fight of the Year Winner vs. Khamzat Chimaev
  - UFC.com Awards
    - 2015: Ranked #3 Submission of the Year vs. Alex Oliveira
    - 2020: Half-Year Awards: Best Fighter of the 1HY & Ranked #4 Fighter of the Year
    - 2022: Ranked #2 Fight of the Year vs. Khamzat Chimaev
- MMAjunkie.com
  - 2021 February Fight of the Month vs. Kamaru Usman
  - 2022 April Fight of the Month vs. Khamzat Chimaev

== Mixed martial arts record ==
Professional record breakdown
32 matches	22 wins	10 losses
By knockout	6	5
By submission	9	0
By decision	7	5

Res.	Record	Opponent	Method	Event	Date	Round	Time	Location	Notes
Loss	22–10	Mike Malott	TKO (punches)	UFC Fight Night: Burns vs. Malott	18 April 2026	3	2:08	Winnipeg, Manitoba, Canada	
Loss	22–9	Michael Morales	TKO (punches)	UFC Fight Night: Burns vs. Morales	17 May 2025	1	3:39	Las Vegas, Nevada, United States	
Loss	22–8	Sean Brady	Decision (unanimous)	UFC Fight Night: Burns vs. Brady	7 September 2024	5	5:00	Las Vegas, Nevada, United States	
Loss	22–7	Jack Della Maddalena	KO (knee and elbows)	UFC 299	9 March 2024	3	3:43	Miami, Florida, United States	
Loss	22–6	Belal Muhammad	Decision (unanimous)	UFC 288	6 May 2023	5	5:00	Newark, New Jersey, United States	
Win	22–5	Jorge Masvidal	Decision (unanimous)	UFC 287	8 April 2023	3	5:00	Miami, Florida, United States	
Win	21–5	Neil Magny	Submission (arm-triangle choke)	UFC 283	21 January 2023	1	4:15	Rio de Janeiro, Brazil	
Loss	20–5	Khamzat Chimaev	Decision (unanimous)	UFC 273	9 April 2022	3	5:00	Jacksonville, Florida, United States	Fight of the Night.
Win	20–4	Stephen Thompson	Decision (unanimous)	UFC 264	10 July 2021	3	5:00	Las Vegas, Nevada, United States	
Loss	19–4	Kamaru Usman	TKO (punches)	UFC 258	13 February 2021	3	0:34	Las Vegas, Nevada, United States	For the UFC Welterweight Championship.
Win	19–3	Tyron Woodley	Decision (unanimous)	UFC on ESPN: Woodley vs. Burns	30 May 2020	5	5:00	Las Vegas, Nevada, United States	Performance of the Night.
Win	18–3	Demian Maia	TKO (punches)	UFC Fight Night: Lee vs. Oliveira	14 March 2020	1	2:34	Brasília, Brazil	Performance of the Night.
Win	17–3	Gunnar Nelson	Decision (unanimous)	UFC Fight Night: Hermansson vs. Cannonier	28 September 2019	3	5:00	Copenhagen, Denmark	
Win	16–3	Alexey Kunchenko	Decision (unanimous)	UFC Fight Night: Shevchenko vs. Carmouche 2	10 August 2019	3	5:00	Montevideo, Uruguay	Return to Welterweight.
Win	15–3	Mike Davis	Submission (rear-naked choke)	UFC Fight Night: Jacaré vs. Hermansson	27 April 2019	2	4:15	Sunrise, Florida, United States	
Win	14–3	Olivier Aubin-Mercier	Decision (unanimous)	UFC 231	8 December 2018	3	5:00	Toronto, Ontario, Canada	
Loss	13–3	Dan Hooker	KO (punches)	UFC 226	7 July 2018	1	2:28	Las Vegas, Nevada, United States	
Win	13–2	Dan Moret	KO (punches)	UFC on Fox: Poirier vs. Gaethje	14 April 2018	2	0:59	Glendale, Arizona, United States	
Win	12–2	Jason Saggo	KO (punch)	UFC Fight Night: Rockhold vs. Branch	16 September 2017	2	4:55	Pittsburgh, Pennsylvania, United States	
Loss	11–2	Michel Prazeres	Decision (unanimous)	UFC Fight Night: Cyborg vs. Länsberg	24 September 2016	3	5:00	Brasília, Brazil	Catchweight (158 lb) bout; Prazeres missed weight.
Win	11–1	Łukasz Sajewski	Submission (armbar)	UFC Fight Night: dos Anjos vs. Alvarez	7 July 2016	1	4:57	Las Vegas, Nevada, United States	
Loss	10–1	Rashid Magomedov	Decision (unanimous)	UFC Fight Night: Belfort vs. Henderson 3	7 November 2015	3	5:00	São Paulo, Brazil	
Win	10–0	Alex Oliveira	Submission (armbar)	UFC Fight Night: Maia vs. LaFlare	21 March 2015	3	4:14	Rio de Janeiro, Brazil	Performance of the Night.
Win	9–0	Christos Giagos	Submission (armbar)	UFC 179	25 October 2014	1	4:57	Rio de Janeiro, Brazil	Return to Lightweight. Performance of the Night.
Win	8–0	Andreas Ståhl	Decision (unanimous)	UFC on Fox: Lawler vs. Brown	26 July 2014	3	5:00	San Jose, California, United States	Welterweight debut.
Win	7–0	Paulo Teixeira	TKO (punches)	Face to Face 7	2 May 2014	1	1:02	Rio de Janeiro, Brazil	
Win	6–0	Paulo Gonçalves	KO (punch)	Coliseu Extreme Fight 8	5 December 2013	1	4:57	Maceió, Brazil	Catchweight (160 lb) bout.
Win	5–0	Rodolfo Coronel	Submission (armbar)	Mixed Submission and Strike Arts 3	25 March 2013	1	3:41	Rio de Janeiro, Brazil	
Win	4–0	Paulo Roberto	TKO (punches)	Champion Pro MMA Fights 1	4 August 2012	1	1:30	Salvador, Brazil	
Win	3–0	Vinicius Alves	Technical Submission (rear-naked choke)	Watchout Combat Show 20	27 July 2012	1	1:59	Rio de Janeiro, Brazil	
Win	2–0	Herels dos Santos	Submission (armbar)	Ichigeki: Fight Night 2012	15 June 2012	1	3:30	São Paulo, Brazil	
Win	1–0	José Salgado	Submission (rear-naked choke)	Crown FC 5	28 January 2012	1	2:40	St. George, Utah, United States	Lightweight debut.

== Pay-per-view bouts ==
No	Event	Fight	Date	Venue	City	PPV buys
1.	UFC 258	Usman vs. Burns	13 February 2021	UFC Apex	Enterprise, Nevada, United States	Not Disclosed

== Submission grappling record ==
Result	Rec	Opponent	Method	Event	Date
Win	10–5	(Brazil) Horlando Monteiro	Submission (Rear Naked Choke)	UFC BJJ 9	4 June 2026
Loss	9–5	(Brazil) Lucas Barbosa	Submission (Face Crank)	BJJ Stars 7	6 November 2021
Win	9–4	(United States) Rafael Lovato Jr.	Decision	Who's #1: Lovato Jr. vs. Burns	30 April 2021
Loss	8–4	(Australia) Craig Jones	Submission (Heel Hook)	Submission Underground 10	22 December 2019
Win	8–3	(United States) Jake Shields	Decision	Quintet Ultra	12 December 2019
Win	7–3	(Japan) Kazushi Sakuraba	Decision	Quintet Ultra	12 December 2019
Win	6–3	(The Bahamas) Yves Edwards	Submission (Rear Naked Choke)	Quintet Ultra	12 December 2019
Loss	5–3	(Norway) Tommy Langaker	Decision	Polaris 12	30 November 2019
Win	5–2	(Brazil) Marcelo Azevedo	Submission (choke)	Third Coast Grappling 2	21 June 2019
Win	4–2	(United States) Gleison Tibau	Submission (Rear Naked Choke)	Titan FC 53	15 March 2019
Win	3–2	(Brazil) Gregor Gracie	Injury	Polaris 7	July 14, 2018
Loss	2–2	(United States) Jake Shields	Quickest Escape	Submission Underground 6	3 December 2017
Win	2–1	(United States) John Combs	Decision	Submission Underground 4	14 May 2017
Win	1–1	(Brazil) Kron Gracie	Points (2-9)	2011 IBJJF World Jiu-Jitsu Championship	5 June 2011
Loss	0–1	(Brazil) Michael Langhi	Decision	2009 IBJJF World Jiu-Jitsu Championship	29 March 2009

== See also ==
- List of male mixed martial artists
