= UFC 198 =

UFC mixed martial arts event in 2016

UFC 198: Werdum vs. Miocic
- The poster for UFC 198: Werdum vs. Miocic
- Promotion: Ultimate Fighting Championship
- Date: May 14, 2016
- Venue: Arena da Baixada
- City: Curitiba, Brazil
- Attendance: 45,207
- Buyrate: 217,000

Event chronology
UFC Fight Night: Overeem vs. Arlovski	UFC 198: Werdum vs. Miocic	UFC Fight Night: Almeida vs. Garbrandt

UFC 198: Werdum vs. Miocic was a mixed martial arts event held on May 14, 2016, at Arena da Baixada in Curitiba, Brazil.

== Background ==
The event was initially announced as a Fight Night event with a middleweight bout between former UFC Light Heavyweight Champion Vitor Belfort and former Strikeforce Middleweight Champion Ronaldo Souza scheduled to serve as headliner. However, it was reported by Brazilian media that this event would become UFC 198 following a series of events in January 2016 that led to the originally planned UFC 196 becoming a UFC Fight Night following a series of cancellations.

On March 4, it was confirmed that the event was indeed changed to PPV and it would be headlined by a UFC Heavyweight Championship bout between champion Fabrício Werdum and top contender Stipe Miocic. They were briefly scheduled to meet at the original UFC 196, as Miocic replaced former two-time champion Cain Velasquez. In turn, Werdum announced on the following day that he was pulling out of the event due to injury as well as he wasn't comfortable with the opponent change while dealing with injuries of his own.

The event was the first that the promotion hosted in Curitiba. It was the fourth stadium venue to host a UFC event after UFC 129 at the Rogers Centre in Canada, UFC on Fox: Gustafsson vs. Johnson at the Tele2 Arena in Sweden and UFC 193 at the Etihad Stadium in Australia.

A lightweight bout between Evan Dunham and The Ultimate Fighter: Brazil 2 winner Leonardo Santos, originally scheduled for this event, was moved to UFC 199 after a minor injury to Dunham delayed the matchup a few weeks.

The event featured the long anticipated debut of Curitiba native Cris Cyborg, former Strikeforce Women's Featherweight Champion and current Invicta FC Featherweight Champion, in a catchweight bout of 140 lb against Leslie Smith.

Kamaru Usman was expected to face Sérgio Moraes at the event. However, he pulled out two weeks before the event due to injury and was replaced by promotional newcomer Luan Chagas.

Former UFC Middleweight Champion Anderson Silva was expected to face Uriah Hall at the event. However, Silva pulled out just four days before the event with a clinical condition that indicated acute cholecystitis and required surgical intervention. The UFC wanted to find a replacement for him, but Hall opted against that.

During the main card broadcast, the UFC announced that former interim UFC Heavyweight Champion and Pride Heavyweight Champion Antônio Rodrigo Nogueira would be inducted to the UFC's Hall of Fame at the "International Fight Week" in July, one day after UFC 200.

== Results ==
Main Card
Weight class				Method	Round	Time	Notes
Heavyweight	Stipe Miocic	def.	Fabrício Werdum (c)	KO (punch)	1	2:47	(Note: For the UFC Heavyweight Championship.)
Middleweight	Ronaldo Souza	def.	Vitor Belfort	TKO (punches)	1	4:38
Catchweight (140 lb)	Cris Cyborg	def.	Leslie Smith	TKO (punches)	1	1:21
Light Heavyweight	Maurício Rua	def.	Corey Anderson	Decision (split) (28–29, 29–28, 29–28)	3	5:00
Welterweight	Bryan Barberena	def.	Warlley Alves	Decision (unanimous) (29–28, 29–28, 29–28)	3	5:00
Preliminary Card (Fox Sports 1)
Welterweight	Demian Maia	def.	Matt Brown	Submission (rear-naked choke)	3	4:31
Middleweight	Thiago Santos	def.	Nate Marquardt	KO (punches)	1	3:39
Lightweight	Francisco Trinaldo	def.	Yancy Medeiros	Decision (unanimous) (29–26, 30–27, 30–26)	3	5:00
Bantamweight	John Lineker	def.	Rob Font	Decision (unanimous) (30–27, 29–28, 30–26)	3	5:00
Preliminary Card (UFC Fight Pass)
Light Heavyweight	Antônio Rogério Nogueira	def.	Patrick Cummins	TKO (punches)	1	4:52
Welterweight	Sérgio Moraes	vs.	Luan Chagas	Draw (split) (29–28, 28–29, 28–28)	3	5:00
Featherweight	Renato Moicano	def.	Zubaira Tukhugov	Decision (split) (28–29, 29–28, 29–28)	3	5:00

== Bonus awards ==
The following fighters were awarded $50,000 bonuses:

- Fight of the Night: Francisco Trinaldo vs. Yancy Medeiros
- Performance of the Night: Stipe Miocic and Ronaldo Souza

== See also ==
- List of UFC events
- 2016 in UFC
