= UFC Fight Night: Cyborg vs. Länsberg =

UFC mixed martial arts event in 2016

- The poster for UFC Fight Night: Cyborg vs. Länsberg
- Promotion: Ultimate Fighting Championship
- Date: September 24, 2016
- Venue: Ginásio Nilson Nelson
- City: Brasília, Brazil
- Attendance: 8,410

Event chronology
| UFC Fight Night: Poirier vs. Johnson | UFC Fight Night: Cyborg vs. Länsberg | UFC Fight Night: Lineker vs. Dodson |

UFC Fight Night: Cyborg vs. Länsberg (also known as UFC Fight Night 95) was a mixed martial arts event produced by the Ultimate Fighting Championship held on September 24, 2016, at Ginásio Nilson Nelson in Brasília, Brazil.

== Background ==
The event in Brasília was the second that the organization hosted in the Brazilian capital city, with the first being UFC Fight Night: Bigfoot vs. Arlovski in September 2014.

The event was headlined by a catchweight bout of 140 lb between former Strikeforce Women's Featherweight Champion and current Invicta FC Featherweight Champion Cris Cyborg and promotional newcomer Lina Länsberg.

On August 13, the card suffered multiple changes due to injury: Brandon Thatch and Shinsho Anzai pulled out of their respective fights against Erick Silva and Luan Chagas. Silva and Chagas were instead rescheduled to face each other. Renato Moicano and Joaquim Silva also pulled out of their respective fights against Mike De La Torre and promotional newcomer Gregor Gillespie. Their replacements were Godofredo Pepey and The Ultimate Fighter: Brazil 4 winner Glaico França, respectively.

At the weigh-ins, Michel Prazeres missed weight by two pounds, weighing in at 158 lb. As a result, he was fined 20% of his fight purse, which went to Gilbert Burns.

== Results ==
Main Card (Fox Sports 1)
| Weight class | | | | Method | Round | Time | Notes |
|---|---|---|---|---|---|---|---|
| Catchweight (140 lb) | Cris Cyborg | def. | Lina Länsberg | TKO (punches) | 2 | 2:29 |
| Featherweight | Renan Barão | def. | Phillipe Nover | Decision (unanimous) (29–28, 29–28, 30–27) | 3 | 5:00 |
| Heavyweight | Roy Nelson | def. | Antônio Silva | KO (punches) | 2 | 4:10 |
| Lightweight | Francisco Trinaldo | def. | Paul Felder | TKO (doctor stoppage) | 3 | 2:25 |
| Middleweight | Eric Spicely | def. | Thiago Santos | Submission (rear-naked choke) | 1 | 2:58 |
| Featherweight | Godofredo Pepey | def. | Mike De La Torre | Submission (rear-naked choke) | 1 | 3:03 |
Preliminary Card (Fox Sports 1)
| Catchweight (158 lb) | Michel Prazeres | def. | Gilbert Burns | Decision (unanimous) (30–27, 30–27, 30–27) | 3 | 5:00 |
| Bantamweight | Rani Yahya | def. | Michinori Tanaka | Decision (unanimous) (29–28, 29–28, 29–28) | 3 | 5:00 |
| Flyweight | Jussier Formiga | def. | Dustin Ortiz | Decision (unanimous) (30–27, 29–27, 29–28) | 3 | 5:00 |
| Welterweight | Erick Silva | def. | Luan Chagas | Submission (rear-naked choke) | 3 | 3:57 |
Preliminary Card (UFC Fight Pass)
| Lightweight | Alan Patrick | def. | Stevie Ray | Decision (unanimous) (29–28, 29–28, 30–27) | 3 | 5:00 |
| Welterweight | Vicente Luque | def. | Héctor Urbina | KO (punch) | 1 | 1:00 |
| Lightweight | Gregor Gillespie | def. | Glaico França | Decision (unanimous) (29–27, 29–27, 29–27) | 3 | 5:00 |

== Bonus awards ==
The following fighters were awarded $50,000 bonuses:

- Fight of the Night: Erick Silva vs. Luan Chagas
- Performance of the Night: Eric Spicely and Vicente Luque

== See also ==
- List of UFC events
- 2016 in UFC
