= UFC Fight Night: Maia vs. LaFlare =

UFC mixed martial arts event in 2015

- The poster for UFC Fight Night: Maia vs. LaFlare
- Promotion: Ultimate Fighting Championship
- Date: March 21, 2015
- Venue: Ginásio do Maracanãzinho
- City: Rio de Janeiro, Brazil
- Attendance: 7,707

Event chronology
UFC 185: Pettis vs. dos Anjos	UFC Fight Night: Maia vs. LaFlare	UFC Fight Night: Mendes vs. Lamas

UFC Fight Night: Maia vs. LaFlare (also known as UFC Fight Night 62) was a mixed martial arts event held on March 21, 2015, at the Ginásio do Maracanãzinho in Rio de Janeiro, Brazil.

== Background ==
After hosting a PPV event at the venue and some others at HSBC Arena, the event was the first Fight Night that the UFC has hosted in Rio de Janeiro.

The event was expected to be headlined by a bantamweight rematch between Urijah Faber and Raphael Assunção. However, on February 2, Assunção was forced out of the bout as his ankle, injured in mid-December 2014, was slow to heal and he was unable to resume the proper training to prepare for the fight in that time frame. The UFC also removed Faber from the card and promoted a welterweight bout between Demian Maia and Ryan LaFlare to the main event.

Matt Wiman was expected to face Leonardo Santos at the event. However, on February 11, Wiman pulled out of the bout citing a back injury and was replaced by Anthony Rocco Martin.

Josh Thomson was expected to face Gilbert Burns at the event. However, on February 26, Thomson pulled out of the fight with an undisclosed injury, while Burns remained on the card and faced promotional newcomer Alex Oliveira.

Ben Saunders was expected to face Erick Silva at the event. However, on March 6, Saunders pulled out of the bout due to an injury. He was replaced by Josh Koscheck. Koscheck had previously fought just 21 days before this event at UFC 184, losing his fight against Jake Ellenberger.

A lightweight fight between Leandro Silva and Drew Dober ended with controversy as referee Eduardo Herdy stopped the bout at 2:45 of the second round for no apparent reason, as Dober had already escaped a guillotine choke attempt. The result was met with an enormous number of complaints from several people related to mixed martial arts. Dober was paid his win bonus regardless. Although initially announcing the controversial result would stand, the Comissão Atlética Brasileira de MMA (CABMMA) – Brazilian MMA Athletic Commission – overturned Silva's win and declared the fight a no-contest on March 26.

On April 9, the CABMMA announced that Jorge de Oliveira failed a fight night drug test, testing positive for the anabolic steroid stanozolol. He was suspended for one year, retroactive to the event date.

== Results ==
Main Card (Fox Sports 1)
Weight class				Method	Round	Time	Notes
Welterweight	Demian Maia	def.	Ryan LaFlare	Decision (unanimous) (48–46, 48–46, 48–46)	5	5:00	(Note: Maia was docked 1 point in the 5th round for stalling on the ground and not engaging in the fight.)
Welterweight	Erick Silva	def.	Josh Koscheck	Submission (guillotine choke)	1	4:21
Lightweight	Leonardo Santos	def.	Anthony Rocco Martin	Submission (rear-naked choke)	2	2:29
Women's Bantamweight	Amanda Nunes	def.	Shayna Baszler	TKO (leg kick)	1	1:56
Lightweight	Gilbert Burns	def.	Alex Oliveira	Submission (armbar)	3	4:14
Featherweight	Godofredo Pepey	def.	Andre Fili	Submission (flying triangle choke)	1	3:14
Preliminary Card (Fox Sports 2)
Lightweight	Francisco Trinaldo	def.	Akbarh Arreola	Decision (unanimous) (30–27, 30–27, 30–27)	3	5:00
Featherweight	Kevin Souza	def.	Katsunori Kikuno	KO (punch)	1	1:31
Lightweight	Leandro Silva	vs.	Drew Dober	No Contest (overturned)	2	2:45	(Note: Originally ruled a submission (guillotine choke) victory for Silva; result overturned to "No Contest" by CABMMA as referee errantly stopped the fight.)
Lightweight	Leonardo Mafra	def.	Cain Carrizosa	Decision (unanimous) (30–26, 30–27, 30–27)	3	5:00
Preliminary Card (UFC Fight Pass)
Lightweight	Christos Giagos	def.	Jorge de Oliveira	Submission (rear-naked choke)	1	3:12
Flyweight	Fredy Serrano	def.	Bentley Syler	KO (punch)	3	1:34

== Bonus awards ==
The following fighters were awarded $50,000 bonuses:

- Fight of the Night: None awarded
- Performance of the Night: Gilbert Burns, Godofredo Pepey, Kevin Souza and Fredy Serrano

== See also ==
- List of UFC events
- 2015 in UFC
