= Yancy Medeiros =

American mixed martial arts fighter (born 1987)

- Born: September 7, 1987 (age 39); Wai'anae, Hawaii, U.S.
- Other names: The Kid
- Height: 5 ft 10 in (1.78 m)
- Weight: 171 lb (78 kg; 12.2 st)
- Division: Light Heavyweight; Middleweight; Welterweight; Lightweight
- Reach: 75 1/2 in (192 cm)
- Fighting out of: Makaha, Hawaii, United States
- Team: Gracie Technics
- Years active: 2007–present

Mixed martial arts record
- Total: 27
- Wins: 16
- By knockout: 8
- By submission: 4
- By decision: 4
- Losses: 9
- By knockout: 4
- By submission: 1
- By decision: 4
- No contests: 2

Other information
- Mixed martial arts record from Sherdog

Yancy Medeiros Jr. (born September 7, 1987) is a former American mixed martial artist who competes in the Lightweight division. A professional competitor since 2007, he has competed for the Ultimate Fighting Championship, Bellator MMA, and Strikeforce.

== Early life ==
Medeiros grew up in Wai'anae Hawaii and at a young age began training in Karate. He is of Filipino and Native Hawaiian descent, known as Hapa Pukiki and Hapa Pilipino. Medeiros wrestled for his Waianae High School wrestling team, placing third in the state wrestling tournament his senior season. Yancy credits Kawika Pa'aluhi, an early pioneer of MMA in Hawaii, with motivating him to train and pursue a career in MMA.

== Mixed martial arts career ==
=== Early career ===
Medeiros began his career 4–0 before defeating EliteXC veteran Po'ai Suganuma at Destiny MMA: Pier Fighter 1. After winning two more fights to bring his record to 7–0, fighting as a Light Heavyweight, he then signed with Strikeforce.

=== Strikeforce ===
In his Strikeforce debut, moving down to Middleweight, Medeiros defeated Raul Castillo by unanimous decision at Strikeforce Challengers: Kaufman vs. Hashi. No. His next fight came against Gareth Joseph which Medeiros won via first-round KO due to punches at Strikeforce: Fedor vs. Werdum.

Medeiros was expected to face John Salter at Strikeforce Challengers: Woodley vs. Saffiedine. However, Medeiros was forced from the bout with an injury.

=== Ultimate Fighting Championship ===
On January 31, 2013, it was announced that Medeiros would be brought over to the Ultimate Fighting Championship as part of the Strikeforce transition.

He dropped two weight classes to Lightweight and made his UFC debut against Rustam Khabilov on April 27, 2013, at UFC 159. The fight ended in unusual fashion as Medeiros dislocated his thumb during a takedown by Khabilov early in the first round, resulting in a TKO victory for Khabilov as Medeiros was unable to continue.

Medeiros took on Yves Edwards at UFC Fight For The Troops 3 on November 6, 2013. He won by KO in the first round. The win, however, was subsequently overturned when Medeiros tested positive for marijuana in his post-fight drug test.

Medeiros was expected to face promotional newcomer Joe Ellenberger on April 26, 2014, at UFC 172. However, in the week leading up to the event, Medeiros was pulled from the Ellenberger bout in favor of a match up on the main card with Jim Miller after his scheduled opponent Bobby Green pulled out of the bout. Medeiros lost the fight via submission in the first round.

Medeiros was expected to face Justin Edwards on August 30, 2014, at UFC 177. However, Edwards pulled out of the event in the days leading up to the event citing an injury. Medeiros instead faced promotional newcomer Damon Jackson. Medeiros won the fight by submission in the second round. The win also earned Medeiros his first Performance of the Night bonus award.

Medeiros faced Joe Proctor on December 12, 2014, at The Ultimate Fighter 20 Finale. Medeiros won the fight in the first round after dropping Proctor with a spinning back kick to the body and securing a guillotine choke to earn the submission. The result also earned Medeiros a Performance of the Night bonus.

Medeiros was expected to face Tony Ferguson on February 28, 2015, at UFC 184. However, Medeiros pulled out of the bout citing injury and was replaced by Gleison Tibau.

Medeiros faced Dustin Poirier on June 6, 2015, at UFC Fight Night 68. He lost the fight via TKO in the first round.

Medeiros faced John Makdessi on December 12, 2015, at UFC 194. He won the fight by split decision.

Medeiros next faced Francisco Trinaldo on May 14, 2016, at UFC 198. He lost the fight via unanimous decision. Both participants were awarded Fight of the Night honors.

==== Move up to welterweight ====
Medeiros faced Sean Spencer in a welterweight bout on September 10, 2016, at UFC 203. He won the fight via submission in the second round and was awarded a Performance of the Night bonus.

Medeiros was expected to face Li Jingliang on January 28, 2017, at UFC on Fox 23. However, in early January, Medeiros pulled out for undisclosed reasons and was replaced by promotional newcomer Bobby Nash.

Medeiros faced Erick Silva on June 3, 2017, at UFC 212. He won the fight via TKO in the second round.

Medeiros faced Alex Oliveira on December 2, 2017, at UFC 218. He won the back-and-forth fight via TKO in the third round. The win also earned him his second Fight of the Night bonus award.

Medeiros faced Donald Cerrone on February 18, 2018, at UFC Fight Night 126. He lost the fight via technical knockout out in round one.

Medeiros was expected to face Mike Perry on July 7, 2018, at UFC 226. However, Medeiros pulled out of the fight on June 27 citing a rib injury and was replaced by Paul Felder.

==== Return to lightweight ====
Medeiros faced Gregor Gillespie in a lightweight bout on January 19, 2019, at UFC Fight Night 143. He lost the fight via TKO in the second round.

Medeiros faced Lando Vannata on February 15, 2020, at UFC Fight Night: Anderson vs. Błachowicz 2. He lost the fight via unanimous decision.

Replacing injured Nikolas Motta, Medeiros was scheduled to fight Damir Hadžović on May 22, 2021, at UFC Fight Night: Font vs. Garbrandt. However, the bout was pulled from the card just hours before taking place due to health issues with Hadžović. The pairing was rescheduled on June 26, 2021, at UFC Fight Night 190. He lost the fight via unanimous decision. Subsequently, he tested positive for marijuana and was suspended for four-and-a-half months by NSAC, making him eligible to return to competition on November 9, 2021.

In August 2021, Medeiros was released from UFC.

=== Bellator MMA ===
Medeiros faced Emmanuel Sanchez on April 23, 2022, at Bellator 279. Medeiros won the bout via unanimous decision.

Medeiros faced Charlie Leary on April 22, 2023, at Bellator 295. Even though he was dropped in the bout, Medeiros dropped Leary and after a barrage of punches, submitted him via rear-naked choke at the end of the first round. It was later announced that the victory was overturned to a no contest after Medeiros tested positive for a banned substance.

Medeiros next faced Jora Ayvazyan on September 7, 2024 at Bellator Champions Series 4, losing the fight via unanimous decision.

== Personal life ==
Medeiros started off his career fighting at light heavyweight. He then moved down to middleweight and eventually made his lightweight debut at UFC 159. Medeiros credits Nick Diaz and Nate Diaz for changing his diet and work ethic which allowed him to lose weight and move down in weight classes.

== Championships and accomplishments ==
- Ultimate Fighting Championship
  - Fight of the Night (Two times) vs. Francisco Trinaldo and Alex Oliveira
  - Performance of the Night (Three times) vs. Damon Jackson, Joe Proctor and Sean Spencer
  - UFC.com Awards
    - 2017: Ranked #3 Fight of the Year vs. Alex Oliveira
- ESPN
  - 2017 Fight of the Year vs. Alex Oliveira at UFC 218
- MMA Sucka
  - 2017 Fight of the Year vs. Alex Oliveira at UFC 218
- MMA Junkie
  - 2017 #2 Ranked Fight of the Year vs. Alex Oliveira at UFC 218

== Mixed martial arts record ==
Professional record breakdown
27 matches	16 wins	9 losses
By knockout	8	4
By submission	4	1
By decision	4	4
No contests	2	

Res.	Record	Opponent	Method	Event	Date	Round	Time	Location	Notes
Loss	16–9 (2)	Jora Ayvazyan	Decision (unanimous)	Bellator Champions Series 4	September 7, 2024	3	5:00	San Diego, California, United States	
NC	16–8 (2)	Charlie Leary	NC (overturned)	Bellator 295	April 22, 2023	1	4:39	Honolulu, Hawaii, United States	Catchweight (165 lb) bout. Originally a Submission (rear-naked choke) win for Medeiros; overturned after he tested positive for a banned substance.
Win	16–8 (1)	Emmanuel Sanchez	Decision (unanimous)	Bellator 279	April 23, 2022	3	5:00	Honolulu, Hawaii, United States	
Loss	15–8 (1)	Damir Hadžović	Decision (unanimous)	UFC Fight Night: Gane vs. Volkov	June 26, 2021	3	5:00	Las Vegas, Nevada, United States	
Loss	15–7 (1)	Lando Vannata	Decision (unanimous)	UFC Fight Night: Anderson vs. Błachowicz 2	February 15, 2020	3	5:00	Rio Rancho, New Mexico, United States	
Loss	15–6 (1)	Gregor Gillespie	TKO (punches)	UFC Fight Night: Cejudo vs. Dillashaw	January 19, 2019	2	4:59	Brooklyn, New York, United States	Return to Lightweight.
Loss	15–5 (1)	Donald Cerrone	TKO (punches)	UFC Fight Night: Cowboy vs. Medeiros	February 18, 2018	1	4:58	Austin, Texas, United States	
Win	15–4 (1)	Alex Oliveira	TKO (punches)	UFC 218	December 2, 2017	3	2:02	Detroit, Michigan, United States	Fight of the Night.
Win	14–4 (1)	Erick Silva	TKO (punches)	UFC 212	June 3, 2017	2	2:01	Rio de Janeiro, Brazil	
Win	13–4 (1)	Sean Spencer	Submission (rear-naked choke)	UFC 203	September 10, 2016	2	0:49	Cleveland, Ohio, United States	Welterweight debut. Performance of the Night.
Loss	12–4 (1)	Francisco Trinaldo	Decision (unanimous)	UFC 198	May 14, 2016	3	5:00	Curitiba, Brazil	Fight of the Night.
Win	12–3 (1)	John Makdessi	Decision (split)	UFC 194	December 12, 2015	3	5:00	Las Vegas, Nevada, United States	
Loss	11–3 (1)	Dustin Poirier	TKO (body kick and punches)	UFC Fight Night: Boetsch vs. Henderson	June 6, 2015	1	2:38	New Orleans, Louisiana, United States	Catchweight (159.5 lb) bout; Medeiros missed weight.
Win	11–2 (1)	Joe Proctor	Submission (guillotine choke)	The Ultimate Fighter: A Champion Will Be Crowned Finale	December 12, 2014	1	4:37	Las Vegas, Nevada, United States	Performance of the Night.
Win	10–2 (1)	Damon Jackson	Submission (reverse bulldog choke)	UFC 177	August 30, 2014	2	1:54	Sacramento, California, United States	Performance of the Night.
Loss	9–2 (1)	Jim Miller	Technical Submission (guillotine choke)	UFC 172	April 26, 2014	1	3:18	Baltimore, Maryland, United States	
NC	9–1 (1)	Yves Edwards	NC (overturned)	UFC: Fight for the Troops 3	November 6, 2013	1	2:47	Fort Campbell, Kentucky, United States	Originally a KO (punches) win for Medeiros; overturned after he tested positive for Marijuana.
Loss	9–1	Rustam Khabilov	TKO (thumb injury)	UFC 159	April 27, 2013	1	2:32	Newark, New Jersey, United States	Lightweight debut.
Win	9–0	Gareth Joseph	KO (punches)	Strikeforce: Fedor vs. Werdum	June 26, 2010	2	1:19	San Jose, California, United States	
Win	8–0	Raul Castillo	Decision (unanimous)	Strikeforce Challengers: Kaufman vs. Hashi	February 26, 2010	3	5:00	San Jose, California, United States	
Win	7–0	Zeke Prados	TKO (punches)	Destiny MMA: Maui No Kaoi	August 22, 2009	1	2:23	Wailuku, Hawaii, United States	
Win	6–0	Jake Yasui	Submission (rear-naked choke)	UNU 1: Seek and Destroy	March 21, 2009	1	1:46	Wailuku, Hawaii, United States	
Win	5–0	Po'ai Suganuma	TKO (punches)	Destiny MMA: Pier Fighter 1	November 15, 2008	3	0:37	Honolulu, Hawaii, United States	Light Heavyweight bout.
Win	4–0	Gino Venti	Decision (unanimous)	Hawaii Fight League 4	October 12, 2008	3	3:00	Waipahu, Hawaii, United States	Middleweight debut.
Win	3–0	Larry Perreira	KO (punches)	Hawaii Fight League 3	May 3, 2008	1	2:37	Waipahu, Hawaii, United States	
Win	2–0	Eddie Ohia	TKO (punches)	Hawaii Fight League 2	January 12, 2008	1	1:23	Honolulu, Hawaii, United States	
Win	1–0	Rigo Mendoza	KO (punches)	Hawaii Fight League 1	October 19, 2007	1	N/A	Honolulu, Hawaii, United States	Light Heavyweight debut.

== See also ==
- List of male mixed martial artists
