= Piotr Hallmann =

Polish mixed martial arts fighter

- Born: August 25, 1987 (age 39); Gdynia, Poland
- Other names: Płetwal (eng. "whale")
- Nationality: Polish
- Height: 5 ft 9 in (1.75 m)
- Weight: 155 lb (70 kg; 11.1 st)
- Division: Lightweight
- Reach: 71.0 in (180 cm)
- Fighting out of: Gdynia, Poland
- Team: MMA Lab
- Years active: 2009–present

Mixed martial arts record
- Total: 25
- Wins: 19
- By knockout: 8
- By submission: 7
- By decision: 4
- Losses: 6
- By knockout: 3
- By decision: 3
- Draws: 0

Other information
- Mixed martial arts record from Sherdog

Piotr Hallmann
- Born: August 27, 1987 (age 39); Gdynia, Poland
- Military career
- Allegiance: Poland
- Branch: Polish Navy
- Rank: Podporucznik (Second Lieutenant)

Piotr Hallmann (born 25 August 1987 in Gdynia) is a Polish mixed martial artist and second lieutenant in the Polish Navy. Hallmann has fought as a lightweight throughout his MMA career, and competed for the Ultimate Fighting Championship.

He is currently fights in the lightweight division of the Absolute Championship Berkut.

== Biography ==
Hallmann was born in Gdynia, Poland on August 25, 1987. He is the first professional athlete from his family. He had shown interest in martial arts at a very young age, when he had started training karate at the age of six. His other athletic pursuits included football and capoeira. He had started training in mixed martial arts in 2008, and made his professional debut one year later.

He trains at Mighty Bulls Gdynia under Grzegorz Jakubowski.

Hallmann graduated from Akademia Marynarki Wojennej and is currently an officer of the Navy, with the rank of Secondary Lieutenant.

== Mixed martial arts career ==
=== Early career ===
Hallmann had made his professional debut at "Beast of the East" event in his hometown, Gdynia, on November 14, 2009, when he defeated Krzysztof Adaszak. After three consecutive wins, he suffered his first career defeat against a German fighter, Christian Eckerlin.

Following that loss, Hallmann collected nine consecutive wins at various European events. He won Casino Fight Night 2011 tournament in Erfurt, as well as World Freefight Challenge and Celtic Gladiator lightweight championship titles.

=== Ultimate Fighting Championship ===
Following his series of wins on European circuit, Hallmann had signed a four-fight deal with the Ultimate Fighting Championship

Hallmann first competed on the UFC Fight Night: Teixeira vs. Bader card, which took place on September 4, 2013 in Brazil. He faced Brazilian fighter Francisco Trinaldo and scored a comeback win by kimura in the second round, after getting repeatedly hurt by kicks to the body in the first round. This performance had earned him a $50,000 Submission of the Night bonus award.

Hallmann faced Al Iaquinta on October 26, 2013 at UFC Fight Night: Machida vs. Munoz. He lost the fight via unanimous decision.

In his highest profile fight with the promotion to date, Hallmann faced Yves Edwards at UFC Fight Night 42 on June 7, 2014. He won the fight via rear-naked choke submission in the third round. The win also earned Hallmann his first Performance of the Night bonus award.

Hallman next faced Gleison Tibau on September 13, 2014 at UFC Fight Night 51. He lost the back-and-forth fight via split decision. Despite the loss on the scorecards, Hallman was awarded a bonus for Fight of the Night. However, Hallman tested positive during a post fight drug screening for drostanolone. In turn, Hallmann was suspended for nine months and his bonus award was rescinded.

Hallman faced promotional newcomer Magomed Mustafaev on June 20, 2015 at UFC Fight Night 69. He lost the fight via TKO in the second round, after the referee stopped the contest on the advice of the doctor due to a large cut over Hallman's left eye.

Hallman faced Alex Oliveira on November 7, 2015 at UFC Fight Night 77. He lost the back-and-forth bout via knockout in the third round and was subsequently released from the promotion.

=== Absolute Championship Berkut ===
Hallmann faced Adrian Zielinski on July 1, 2017 at ACB 63. He won the fight via split decision.

== Championships and accomplishments ==
=== Mixed martial arts ===
- Ultimate Fighting Championship
  - Fight of the Night (One time) vs. Gleison Tibau
  - Performance of the Night (One time) vs. Yves Edwards
  - Submission of the Night (One time) vs. Francisco Trinaldo
  - UFC.com Awards
    - 2013: Ranked #9 Submission of the Year vs. Francisco Trinaldo

== Mixed martial arts record ==
Professional record breakdown
25 matches	19 wins	6 losses
By knockout	8	3
By submission	7	0
By decision	4	3

Res.	Record	Opponent	Method	Event	Date	Round	Time	Location	Notes
Win	19–6	Damien Lapilus	TKO (leg injury)	Boxing Night 14: Narodowa Gala Boksu	May 25, 2018	1	0:35	Warsaw, Poland	
Win	18–6	Adrian Zielinski	Decision (split)	ACB 63	July 1, 2017	3	5:00	Gdańsk, Poland	
Win	17–6	Patryk Nowak	Decision (unanimous)	FEN 17	May 12, 2017	3	5:00	Gdynia, Poland	
Loss	16–6	Kamil Łebkowski	Decision (unanimous)	FEN 12	August 13, 2016	3	5:00	Gdynia, Poland	
Win	16–5	Jason Ponet	Decision (split)	Slavia Republic 1	April 30, 2016	3	5:00	Gdynia, Poland	
Loss	15–5	Alex Oliveira	KO (punch)	UFC Fight Night: Belfort vs. Henderson 3	November 7, 2015	3	0:54	São Paulo, Brazil	
Loss	15–4	Magomed Mustafaev	TKO (doctor stoppage)	UFC Fight Night: Jędrzejczyk vs. Penne	June 20, 2015	2	3:24	Berlin, Germany	
Loss	15–3	Gleison Tibau	Decision (split)	UFC Fight Night: Bigfoot vs. Arlovski	September 13, 2014	3	5:00	Brasília, Brazil	Fight of the Night.
Win	15–2	Yves Edwards	Submission (rear-naked choke)	UFC Fight Night: Henderson vs. Khabilov	June 7, 2014	3	2:31	Albuquerque, New Mexico, United States	Performance of the Night.
Loss	14–2	Al Iaquinta	Decision (unanimous)	UFC Fight Night: Machida vs. Munoz	October 26, 2013	3	5:00	Manchester, England	
Win	14–1	Francisco Trinaldo	Submission (kimura)	UFC Fight Night: Teixeira vs. Bader	September 4, 2013	2	3:50	Belo Horizonte, Brazil	Submission of the Night.
Win	13–1	Juha-Pekka Vainikainen	Decision (unanimous)	MMA Attack 3	April 27, 2013	3	5:00	Katowice, Poland	
Win	12–1	Ivica Truscek	Submission (rear-naked choke)	Celtic Gladiator VI	February 9, 2013	2	2:03	Saggart, Ireland	Won the CG Lightweight Championship.
Win	11–1	Vaso Bakočević	TKO (doctor stoppage)	WFC 17: Olimp Live & Fight	October 21, 2012	2	0:47	Ljubljana, Slovenia	Won the WFC Lightweight Championship.
Win	10–1	Jarkko Latomaki	TKO (punches)	Botnia Punishment 12	September 14, 2012	1	4:02	Seinajoki, Finland	
Win	9–1	Kevin Donnelly	Submission (rear-naked choke)	Cage Warriors Fight Night 5	May 22, 2012	3	4:10	Amman, Jordan	
Win	8–1	Szymon Walaszek	Submission (rear-naked choke)	Round 1	November 12, 2011	1	2:18	Białogard, Poland	
Win	7–1	Tamirlan Dadajew	Submission (rear-naked choke)	Casino Fight Night 2	April 9, 2011	1	11:23	Erfurt, Germany	
Win	6–1	Avtandil Shoshiashvili	KO (punch)	Casino Fight Night 2	April 9, 2011	1	0:12	Erfurt, Germany	
Win	5–1	Rastislav Hanulay	Submission (rear-naked choke)	Ring XF 3: Double Battle	March 5, 2011	2	4:08	Zgierz, Poland	
Loss	4–1	Christian Eckerlin	TKO (retirement)	GMC 2: Continued	October 10, 2010	4	0:51	Herne, Germany	
Win	4–0	Kerim Abzaiłow	KO (punches)	RING XF 2: Second Coming	May 30, 2010	1	2:47	Łódź, Poland	
Win	3–0	Rafał Terlikowski	TKO (punches)	Shooto Poland: Polish Shooto League 9	February 27, 2010	1	1:42	Przodkowo, Poland	
Win	2–0	Paweł Wołowiec	TKO (punches)	Shooto Poland: Held vs. Lasota	November 21, 2009	1	2:15	Kielce, Poland	
Win	1–0	Krzysztof Adaszak	TKO (punches)	Beast of the East	November 14, 2009	1	2:49	Gdynia, Poland	

== See also ==
- List of current UFC fighters
- List of male mixed martial artists
