= Luan Chagas =

Brazilian mixed martial arts fighter

- Born: 17 June 1993 (age 33); Navirai, Mato Grosso do Sul, Brazil
- Other names: Tarzan
- Height: 5 ft 11 in (1.80 m)
- Weight: 168 lb (76 kg; 12 st 0 lb)
- Division: Welterweight
- Reach: 75 in (191 cm)
- Team: Gile Ribeiro Team; Noguchi Team
- Teacher: Gile Ribeiro
- Rank: Black belt in Brazilian Jiu-Jitsu; Black belt in Karate
- Years active: 2012–present

Mixed martial arts record
- Total: 19
- Wins: 15
- By knockout: 6
- By submission: 9
- Losses: 3
- By knockout: 1
- By submission: 2
- Draws: 1

Other information
- Mixed martial arts record from Sherdog

Luan Chagas (born 9 November 1989) is a Brazilian mixed martial artist who competed in the Welterweight division of the Ultimate Fighting Championship.

== Background ==
Chagas was born in Navirai, Brazil and he attended Karate classes at the early age and was the children's champion in the sport in Brazil. He started training BJJ at Gile Ribeiro gym after he moved to Curitiba where he received his black belt in 2015. He transitioned to MMA later and started competing in MMA and won the welterweight championship for Curitiba Fight Pro.

== Mixed martial arts career ==
=== Early career ===
Chagas stated his professional MMA career on 28 July 2012 and he fought all his fights in Brazil. He was the Curitiba Fight Pro middleweight champion and amassed a record of 14-1 prior signed by UFC.

=== Ultimate Fighting Championship ===
In his UFC debut, Chagas faced Sérgio Moraes as a late replacement, on 14 May 2016 at UFC 198 in Curitiba, Brazil. Chagas started the fight with a barrage of punches on round one and dropped Moraes on round two with a leg kick. Moraes took down Chagas but was not able to score a submission. After three rounds, the fight was declared a draw.

His next UFC fight was in September 2016 against Erick Silva at UFC Fight Night: Cyborg vs. Lansberg. He lost the fight via submission on round three. The fight earned him the Fight of the Night award.

On 3 June 2017, he faced Jim Wallhead at UFC 212. He submitted Wallhead via a rear-naked choke on round two and won the fight.

Chagas was scheduled to face Niko Price on 28 October 2017 UFC Fight Night: Brunson vs. Machida. on 6 October 2017, it was announced that Chagas has fractured his foot and was pulled out from the bout.

Chagas faced Siyar Bahadurzada on 21 April 2018 at UFC Fight Night 128. He lost the fight via knockout in round two.

With his last bout being the last of his UFC contract, Chagas became a free agent.

== Fighting style ==
With a background in Karate and Muay Thai, Chagas relies heavily on his kicking game as part of his fighting strategy. He throws sharp, chopping low kicks and mixes them with wheel and head kicks in an attempt to score a knockdown. He is also a competent wrestler and likes to pressure his opponents with flurries of lunging strikes, particularly in the early rounds.

== Personal life ==
Chagas moniker "Tarzan" was coined after where he was from, Navirai, Mato Grosso do Sul in Brazil where 65% of the Brazilian Pantanal, a natural region encompassing largest tropical wetland area in the world.

== Mixed martial arts record ==
Professional record breakdown
19 matches	15 wins	3 losses
By knockout	6	1
By submission	9	2
Draws	1	

Res.	Record	Opponent	Method	Event	Date	Round	Time	Location	Notes
Loss	15–3–1	Siyar Bahadurzada	KO (front kick to the body and punch)	UFC Fight Night: Barboza vs. Lee	21 April 2018	2	2:40	Atlantic City, New Jersey, United States	
Win	15–2–1	Jim Wallhead	Submission (rear-naked choke)	UFC 212	3 June 2017	2	4:48	Rio de Janeiro, Brazil	
Loss	14–2–1	Erick Silva	Submission (rear-naked choke)	UFC Fight Night: Cyborg vs. Lansberg	24 September 2016	3	3:57	Brasília, Brazil	Fight of the Night.
Draw	14–1–1	Sérgio Moraes	Draw (split)	UFC 198	14 May 2016	3	5:00	Curitiba, Brazil	
Win	14–1	Eduardo Garvon	Submission (rear-naked choke)	Imortal FC 2	13 December 2015	1	4:14	São José dos Pinhais, Brazil	
Win	13–1	Edvald de Oliveira	TKO	Frontline Fight Series 1	19 September 2015	2	0:00	São José dos Pinhais, Brazil	
Win	12–1	Julio Cesar Andrade	Submission (armbar)	Max Fight 15	4 July 2015	2	1:27	Ilha Comprida, Brazil	
Win	11–1	Julio Cesar Bilik	Submission (rear-naked choke)	Curitiba Fight Pro 3	7 March 2015	1	4:22	Curitiba, Brazil	Won the vacant CFP Welterweight Championship.
Win	10–1	Christian Ferreira	Submission (armbar)	Power Fight Extreme 12	13 December 2014	2	1:59	Curitiba, Brazil	
Win	9–1	Allan Simon	TKO (punches)	Curitiba Fight Pro 2	9 August 2014	1	2:16	Curitiba, Brazil	
Win	8–1	Roberto Ordza	Submission (triangle choke)	Samurai FC: Power Fight Extreme 10	30 November 2013	1	1:42	Curitiba, Brazil	
Win	7–1	Silas Robson de Oliveira	TKO (punches and knees)	Watch Out Combat Show 28	10 August 2013	3	5:00	Curitiba, Brazil	
Win	6–1	Edson Lopes	Submission (rear-naked choke)	Power Fight Extreme 9	29 June 2013	1	4:57	Curitiba, Brazil	
Loss	5–1	Lorival Lourenco Jr.	Submission (rear-naked choke)	Gladiator Combat Fight 1	6 April 2013	2	1:46	Curitiba, Brazil	
Win	5–0	Jose Luiz Domingues da Silva	Submission	Adventure Fighters Tournament 4	9 March 2013	1	2:22	Curitiba, Brazil	
Win	4–0	Everton Souza	TKO (punches)	Striker's House Cup 23	23 February 2013	1	1:29	Curitiba, Brazil	
Win	3–0	Cassio Pit	Submission (rear-naked choke)	Striker's House Cup 22	8 December 2012	1	2:02	Curitiba, Brazil	
Win	2–0	Adriano Carvalho	TKO (punches)	G1 Open Fight 14	15 September 2012	1	0:45	Siqueira Campos, Brazil	
Win	1–0	Alex Morales	TKO (punches)	Face the Danger 3	28 July 2012	1	N/A	Curitiba, Brazil	

== See also ==
- List of current UFC fighters
- List of male mixed martial artists
