= Boro Janičić =

Montenegrin footballer (born 1967)

Personal information
- Full name: Boro Janičić
- Date of birth: 1967 (age 58–59)
- Place of birth: SFR Yugoslavia
- Height: 1.84 m (6 ft 0 in)
- Position: Midfielder

Senior career*
Years	Team	Apps	(Gls)
1988–1991	Sutjeska Nikšić	86	(1)
- Obilić
1992-1994	Budućnost Podgorica	23	(0)
1994–1995	LG Cheetahs	34	(0)
- * Club domestic league appearances and goals as of 15 August 2013

Boro Janičić (born 1967) is a retired Montenegrin footballer who played as a midfielder.

== Club career ==
He played with FK Sutjeska Nikšić in the Yugoslav Second League between 1988 and 1991. Then, he played for FC Seoul of the South Korean K League, then known as LG Cheetahs.
