= Raul Castillo (fighter) =

American mixed martial arts fighter

- Nationality: American
- Height: 5 ft 11 in (1.80 m)
- Weight: 185 lb (84 kg; 13.2 st)
- Division: Middleweight
- Fighting out of: Half Moon Bay, California
- Team: Raul Castillo Martial Arts
- Years active: 2007-present

Mixed martial arts record
- Total: 7
- Wins: 6
- By knockout: 4
- By submission: 2
- Losses: 1
- By decision: 1

Other information
- Mixed martial arts record from Sherdog

Raul Castillo is an American mixed martial artist from Half Moon Bay, California. He last competed in 2015, and made appearances for the Strikeforce promotion.

== Mixed martial arts record ==
Professional record breakdown
8 matches	7 wins	1 loss
By knockout	4	0
By submission	2	0
By decision	1	1

Res.	Record	Opponent	Method	Event	Date	Round	Time	Location	Notes
Win	7–1	Mauricio Alonso	Decision	Dragon House 19	March 21, 2015	3	5:00	San Francisco, California, United States	
Loss	6–1	Yancy Medeiros	Decision (unanimous)	Strikeforce Challengers: Kaufman vs. Hashi	February 26, 2010	3	5:00	San Jose, California, United States	
Win	6–0	Brandon Michaels	Submission (rear-naked choke)	Strikeforce: Shamrock vs. Diaz	April 11, 2009	1	1:45	San Jose, California, United States	Catchweight (188 lb) bout.
Win	5–0	Josh Neal	TKO (punches)	GC 80: Summer Showdown	July 18, 2008	1	2:12	San Francisco, California, United States	
Win	4–0	Eric Lawson	TKO	GC 72: Seasons Beatings	December 8, 2007	2	2:23	San Francisco, California, United States	
Win	3–0	Nik Theotikos	Submission (choke)	GC 66: Battle Ground	July 27, 2007	1	N/A	San Francisco, California, United States	
Win	2–0	Andrew Montanez	TKO (punches)	Strikeforce: Triple Threat	December 8, 2006	1	2:10	San Jose, California, United States	
Win	1–0	Victor Cabian	TKO	West Coast Fighters	May 13, 2006	1	1:30	Portland, Oregon, United States	
