= Miloš Janičić =

Montenegrin mixed martial artist (born 1997)

- Born: May 3, 1997 (age 29); Podgorica, Montenegro, FR Yugoslavia
- Native name: Милош Јаничић
- Other names: Cobra
- Height: 5 ft 11 in (1.80 m)
- Weight: 156 lb (71 kg; 11 st 2 lb)
- Division: Lightweight (2019, 2021, 2023–present); Welterweight (2016, 2018–2020, 2022); Middleweight (2015–2019)
- Reach: 72.8 in (185 cm)
- Fighting out of: Podgorica, Montenegro
- Team: UFD Gym
- Years active: 2015–present

Kickboxing record
- Total: 1
- Losses: 1

Mixed martial arts record
- Total: 23
- Wins: 19
- By knockout: 11
- By submission: 8
- Losses: 4
- By knockout: 1
- By submission: 1
- By decision: 2

Other information
- Mixed martial arts record from Sherdog

Miloš Janičić (Serbian Cyrillic: Милош Јаничић; born May 3, 1997) is a Montenegrin professional mixed martial artist and kickboxer. He currently competes in the Lightweight division for the Ultimate Fighting Championship (UFC). Janičić has previously competed on Fight Nation Championship, KSW, and Oktagon.

== Professional career ==
=== Early career ===
Janičić made his professional debut on July 28, 2015 against Aleksandar Brajković. Janičić won the fight via a first-round submission.

=== Konfrontacja Sztuk Walki ===
After accumulating a career record of 11–2, Janičić made his debut under Polish federation Konfrontacja Sztuk Walki on November 9, 2019 against Roman Szymański. Janičić lost the fight via Unanimous Decision.

=== Fight Nation Championship ===
Janičić made his debut under Croatian federation Fight Nation Championship on July 31, 2020 against Tonči Peruško. Janičić won the fight via a first-round submission.

=== Oktagon MMA ===
After a one-off fight in the country of Serbia, Janičić made his debut under Czech federation Oktagon MMA on November 6, 2021 against Jaroslav Pokorný. Janičić won the fight via a third-round submission.

=== Returns to Serbian Battle Championship and Fight Nation Championship ===
Janičić returned to Serbian Battle Championship on September 9, 2022 against Akbar Gadzhiekperov. Janičić won the fight via a third-round TKO.

Janičić returned to Fight Nation Championship on March 4, 2023 against Joelson Nascimento. Janičić won the fight via a first-round TKO.

=== Return to Oktagon MMA ===
Janičić returned to Oktagon MMA on March 2, 2024 against Ebrahim Hosseinpour. Janičić won the fight via a second-round TKO.

=== Return to Fight Nation Championship ===
Janičić returned to Fight Nation Championship on May 24, 2025 against Marko Bojković. Janičić won the fight via a second-round TKO.

Janičić faced UFC veteran Alex Oliveira on December 20, 2025, at FNC 26. Janičić won the fight via a first-round TKO.

=== Ultimate Fighting Championship ===
On June 23, 2026, it was announced that Janičić had signed with the Ultimate Fighting Championship (UFC).

Janičić made his UFC debut against Noah Gugnon on August 1, 2026, at UFC Fight Night 283. He lost the fight via a rear-naked choke submission in the first round.

== Bare-knuckle boxing career ==
Janičić made his bare-knuckle boxing debut on December 15, 2023 against Ognjen Dimić. Janičić won the fight via split decision.

== Kickboxing career ==
Janičić made his kickboxing debut on July 13, 2024 against Stefan Dobrijević. Janičić lost the fight via split decision.

== Dirty boxing career ==
Janičić made his dirty boxing debut on June 14, 2025 against Guilherme Bastos. Janičić won the fight via Unanimous Decision.

His next fight came on August 29, 2025 against Lamar Brown. Janičić won the fight via a first-round TKO.

== Personal life ==
Janičić is an ethnic Serb and enters the ring with the tricolor flag of the Kingdom of Montenegro which is nowadays used as an ethnic flag of Serbs of Montenegro. Janičić has criticized the Montenegrin government for the recognition of Kosovo and the legalization of gay-marriage.

== Mixed martial arts record ==
Professional record breakdown
23 matches	19 wins	4 losses
By knockout	11	1
By submission	8	1
By decision	0	2

Res.	Record	Opponent	Method	Event	Date	Round	Time	Location	Notes
Loss	19–4	Noah Gugnon	Submission (rear-naked choke)	UFC Fight Night: Medić vs. Rodriguez	August 1, 2026	1	1:21	Belgrade, Serbia	
Win	19–3	Alex Oliveira	TKO (punches)	Fight Nation Championship 26	December 20, 2025	1	1:50	Podgorica, Montenegro	Catchweight (161 lb) bout.
Win	18–3	Marko Bojković	TKO (punches)	Fight Nation Championship 23	May 24, 2025	2	2:22	Belgrade, Serbia	
Win	17–3	Ebrahim Hosseinpour	TKO (knee)	Oktagon 54	March 2, 2024	2	1:23	Ostrava, Czech Republic	Oktagon Lightweight Tournament Reserve bout; Hosseinpour missed weight (162.7 lb).
Win	16–3	Joelson Nascimento	TKO (punches)	Fight Nation Championship 10	March 4, 2023	1	1:29	Ljubuški, Bosnia and Herzegovina	
Win	15–3	Akbar Gadzhiekperov	TKO (punches)	Serbian Battle Championship 44	September 9, 2022	3	1:52	Belgrade, Serbia	Welterweight bout.
Win	14–3	Jaroslav Pokorný	Submission (heel hook)	Oktagon Prime 4	November 6, 2021	3	4:43	Pardubice, Czech Republic	
Win	13–3	Ivan Sakić	Submission (rear-naked choke)	Megdan Fighting 7	October 14, 2020	1	1:02	Novi Sad, Serbia	Catchweight (163 lb) bout.
Win	12–3	Tonči Peruško	Submission (guillotine choke)	Fight Nation Championship 3	July 31, 2020	1	1:15	Zagreb, Croatia	Welterweight bout.
Loss	11–3	Roman Szymański	Decision (unanimous)	KSW 51	November 9, 2019	3	5:00	Zagreb, Croatia	Lightweight debut.
Win	11–2	Zoran Đođ	TKO (punches)	Megdan Fighting 4	March 15, 2019	2	4:16	Novi Sad, Serbia	
Win	10–2	Ivan Vladimir	Submission (anaconda choke)	Montenegro FC 8	June 16, 2018	1	1:10	Bar, Montenegro	Welterweight bout.
Win	9–2	Marko Radaković	KO (punches)	Megdan Fighting 3	April 26, 2018	3	4:00	Novi Sad, Serbia	
Win	8–2	Mirza Sendić	Submission (anaconda choke)	Montenegro FC 6	December 23, 2017	1	N/A	Podgorica, Montenegro	
Win	7–2	Dragutin Milošević	TKO (punches)	Megdan Fighting 2	November 25, 2017	2	3:48	Novi Sad, Serbia	
Win	6–2	Ivan Skoko	TKO (doctor stoppage)	Montenegro FC 5	June 8, 2017	2	N/A	Podgorica, Montenegro	
Win	5–2	Ivan Karačić	Submission (kimura)	Cage Fight Championship 3	February 26, 2017	1	3:01	Ljubljana, Slovenia	
Win	4–2	Branislav Došenović	TKO (punches)	Montenegro FC 4	December 11, 2016	1	1:26	Podgorica, Montenegro	
Win	3–2	Igor Lazarevski	Submission (north-south choke)	Night of the Eternal: Forever with You	October 8, 2016	1	1:57	Veles, Macedonia	
Win	2–2	Mladen Krndija	TKO (punches)	Brcko Fight Night 4	August 20, 2016	1	1:55	Brčko, Bosnia and Herzegovina	Return to Middleweight.
Loss	1–2	Stefan Negucić	TKO (punches)	Montenegro FC: Fight Night 1	June 12, 2016	2	N/A	Podgorica, Montenegro	
Loss	1–1	Vladimir Prodanović	Decision (unanimous)	Serbian Battle Championship 9	April 16, 2016	3	5:00	Odžaci, Serbia	Welterweight debut.
Win	1–0	Aleksandar Brajković	Submission (guillotine choke)	Montenegro FC 3	July 28, 2015	1	3:27	Budva, Montenegro	Middleweight debut.

== Kickboxing record ==
Professional kickboxing record
0 Wins (0 (T)KOs), 1 Loss, 0 Draw
Date	Result	Opponent	Event	Location	Method	Round	Time
2024-07-13	Loss	(Bosnia and Herzegovina) Stefan Dobrijević	Fight Nation Championship 18	Banja Luka, Bosnia and Herzegovina	Decision (split)	3	5:00

== Bare-knuckle boxing record ==
Professional record breakdown
1 match	1 win	0 losses
By knockout	0	0
By decision	1	0

Res.	Record	Opponent	Method	Event	Date	Round	Time	Location	Notes
Win	1–0	Ognjen Dimić	Decision (split)	Serbian Battle Championship 48	December 15, 2023	2	2:00	Odžaci, Serbia	

== Dirty boxing record ==
Professional record breakdown
3 matches	3 wins	0 losses
By knockout	2	0
By decision	1	0

Res.	Record	Opponent	Method	Event	Date	Round	Time	Location	Notes
Win	3–0	Taylor Burley	TKO (punches and elbows)	Dirty Boxing Championship 6	April 10, 2026	1	0:44	Miami, Florida, United States	
Win	2–0	Lamar Brown	TKO (punches)	Dirty Boxing Championship 3	August 29, 2025	1	0:59	Miami, Florida, United States	
Win	1–0	Guilherme Bastos	Decision (unanimous)	Dirty Boxing Championship 2	June 14, 2025	3	5:00	Miami, Florida, United States	
