= Ervália =

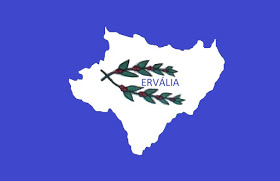
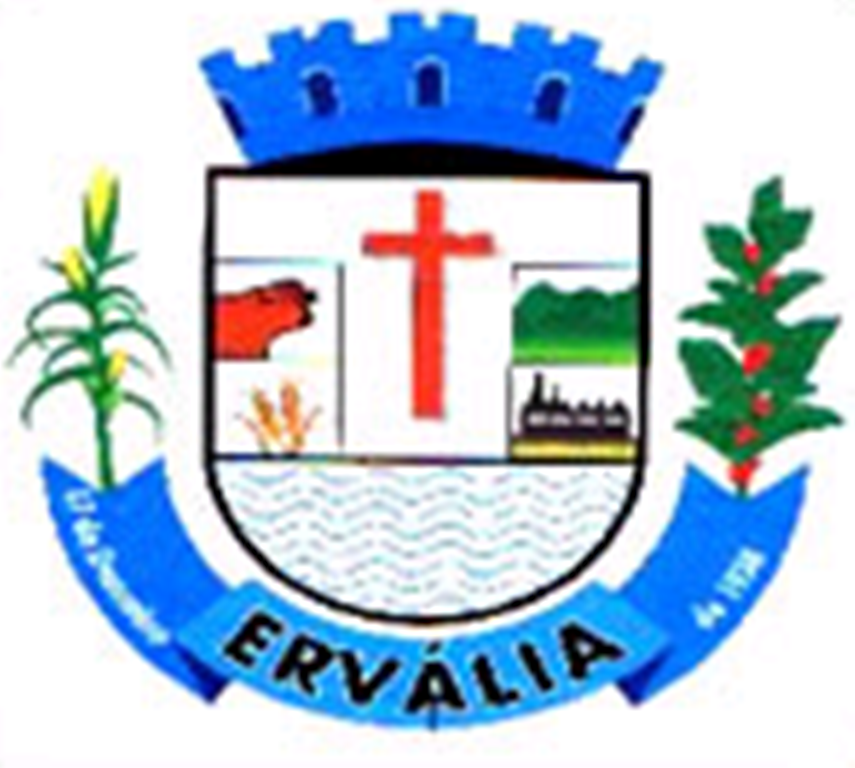
- Flag Coat of arms

- Location within Brazil
- Coordinates: 20°54′24″S 42°39′25″W
- Country: Brazil
- State: Minas Gerais
- Mesoregion: Zona da Mata
- Microregion: Viçosa

Government
  - Mayor: Edson Said Rezende

Area
  - Total: 357.489 km^{2} (138.027 sq mi)
- Elevation: 800 m (2,600 ft)

Population (2020)
  - Total: 18,958
  - Density: 53.031/km^{2} (137.35/sq mi)
- Demonym: Ervalenses
- Time zone: UTC−3 (BRT)

Ervália is a Brazilian municipality located in the state of Minas Gerais.

== See also ==
- List of municipalities in Minas Gerais
