= Chris Haueter =

Brazilian jiu-jitsu practitioner from the US

Christopher Haueter
- Born: 27 December 1964 (age 61); California
- Style: Brazilian Jiu-Jitsu
- Team: Combat Base; Rigan Machado
- Teachers: Rigan Machado; Dan Inosanto
- Rank: 6th deg. BJJ black belt (under Rigan Machado)

Other information
- Occupation: BJJ instructor
- Spouse: Melissa Haueter
- Notable students: Matt Thornton; Mads Burnell
- Website: https://www.combatbase.com/

Chris Haueter is a 6th degree black belt Brazilian jiu jitsu practitioner and coach. As one of the first non-Brazilians to achieve the rank of black belt and the first American black belt to compete at the World Jiu-Jitsu Championship, he is regarded as a pioneer of the sport. Haueter is also known for coining several unnamed Brazilian jiu-jitsu's positions.

== Biography ==
Christopher Bard Haueter was born in 1964 in California. Haueter started training karate before switching to wrestling in school, After completing high school he joined the US Marine Corps. After trying muay thai and boxing Haueter started Brazilian jiu-jitsu (BJJ) at Rorion Gracie’s garage, where he met his mentor Rigan Machado. After Machado started his academy Haueter followed receiving his black belt from him in December 1996. He is considered one of BJJ Dirty Dozen, the first 12 Non-Brazilian recipients of the BJJ black belt.

As one of the first American black belts in Brazilian Jiu-Jitsu, Haueter named new positions as BJJ rapidly developed in the mid 1990s, famously coining the term "combat base" stance and naming his academy after it. Haueter is known as the first American to submit a Brazilian in competition and the first American black belt to compete at the World Jiu-Jitsu Championship in Brazil. During his coaching career Haueter has awarded black belts to some notable practitioners such as Matt Thornton, the founder of Straight Blast Gym (SBG) who awarded John Kavanagh his black belt in 2007, leading Conor McGregor to call Haueter his "coach's coach's coach".

Haueter is also known as the head referee for the Metamoris grappling promotion, and for designing the Magikimono, a jiu-jitsu kimono for the Shoyoroll brand.

A memoir of Chris's life, The Chris Haueter Book, written in collaboration with Scott Burr, was published in August of 2026.

== Brazilian Jiu-Jitsu competitive summary ==
Main Achievements (Black Belt):

- IBJJF Master 4 Pan Jiu-Jitsu Champion (2011
- IBJJF Master 3 World Jiu-Jitsu No-gi Champion (2009)
- IBJJF Master 3 Pan Jiu-Jitsu Champion (2009)
- 2nd place IBJJF Master 3 Pan Jiu-Jitsu Champion (2010)
- 3rd place IBJJF Master 1 American National Jiu-jitsu Championship (2009)

== Instructor lineage ==
Mitsuyo Maeda → Carlos Gracie Sr. → Hélio Gracie → Rolls Gracie & Carlos Gracie Jr → Rigan Machado → Chris Haueter

== See also ==
- List of Brazilian Jiu-Jitsu practitioners
