= List of Irish UFC fighters =

Ultimate Fighting Championship
- Leader: FIGHTERS Total: 10

The Ultimate Fighting Championship (UFC) is a mixed martial arts (MMA) promotion, founded in 1993 by Art Davie and Rorion Gracie. The organization was purchased from its parent company SEG in 2001 by Zuffa LLC, a promotional company owned by Las Vegas casino magnates, Lorenzo and Frank Fertitta and managed by Dana White (current president of operations). Since its inception, and through its current Zuffa management, the UFC has remained one of the more dominant MMA promotions in the world, playing host to a wide field of MMA fighters.

This list provides an up-to-date roster of all Irish fighters currently competing or have previously competed under the UFC promotional banner. (Note: Unless otherwise cited, all fighters listed are retrieved from ufc.com.) (Note: All names presented are in accordance with UFC.com profiles and may include common nicknames or alternative spellings rather than birth names.) (Note: Fighters are included on this list if they were born in Ireland (the Republic of Ireland/Northern Ireland) or if they have represented Ireland during their professional UFC career.) (Note: Fighters are organized by weight class and within their weight class by their debut under the UFC promotion.)

The ISO listed next to a Fighters name as well as their birthplace and where they fight out of is determined by information displayed on UFC broadcasts. (Note: Where a Fighter is born, fighting out of, and the flag they represent is provided by the UFC during live broadcasts.)

The team a Fighter trains with is based on who primarily corners them during their professional bouts in the UFC.

Each fight record has four categories: wins, losses, draws, and no-contests (NC). All fight records in this article are displayed in that order, with fights resulting in a no-contest listed in parentheses. (Note: Unless otherwise cited, all records are retrieved from sherdog.com.)

== Heavyweights (265 lb, 120 kg) ==
ISO	Name	Nickname	UFC record	Birthplace	Fighting Out Of	Team	UFC Debut	Notes
NIR	Colin Robinson	Big C	0–2	Ballymena, Northern Ireland	Antrim, Northern Ireland	UFR Fight Team/Next Generation Northern Ireland	16/06/2007	

== Welterweights (170 lb, 77 kg) ==
ISO	Name	Nickname	UFC record	Birthplace	Fighting Out Of	Team	UFC Debut	Notes
IRE	Kiefer Crosbie	BDK	0–3	North Inner City Dublin, Ireland	North Inner City Dublin, Ireland	SBG Ireland	09/09/2023	
IRE	Dean Barry	The Sniper	0–1	Dublin, Ireland	Dublin, Ireland	Team Ryano	23/04/2022	
IRE	Ian Machado Garry	The Future	17–1	Dublin, Ireland	Dublin, Ireland By Way Of Belo Horizonte, Brazil	Chute Boxe Diego Lima Kill Cliff FC	06/11/2021	
IRE NIR	Rhys McKee	Skeletor	1–4	Ballymena, Northern Ireland	Ballymena, Northern Ireland	Fight Academy Ireland Next Generation Northern Ireland	25/07/2020	
IRE	Charlie Ward	Relentless	0–2	Portlaoise, Ireland	Dublin, Ireland By Way Of Mountmellick, Ireland	SBG Ireland	19/11/2016	
IRE	Cathal Pendred	The Punisher	4–2	Boston, Massachusetts	Dublin, Ireland	SBG Ireland	19/07/2014	
IRE	Tom Egan	The Tank	0–1	Dublin, Ireland	Dublin, Ireland	SBG Ireland	17/01/2009	First Irish UFC Fighter - competed at UFC 93
IRE	Stevie Lynch	The Smiling Assassin	0–1	Belfast, Northern Ireland	Antrim, Northern Ireland	UFR Fight Team	16/06/2007	First Northern Irish UFC Fighter - competed in UFC 72

== Lightweights (155 lb, 70 kg) ==
ISO	Name	Nickname	UFC record	Birthplace	Fighting Out Of	Team	UFC Debut	Notes
IRE	Richie Smullen		0-1	Dublin, Ireland	Dublin, Ireland	SBG Ireland	06/07/2018	
RUS IRE	Artem Lobov	The Russian Hammer	2-5	Nizhny Novgorod, Russia	Dublin, Ireland	SBG Ireland	11/12/2015	
IRE	Joe Duffy	Irish	4–4	Donegal, Ireland	Donegal, Ireland	Tristar Gym	14/03/2015	
IRE	Conor McGregor	The Notorious	10–5	Dublin, Ireland	Dublin, Ireland	SBG Ireland	06/04/2013	Former UFC Lightweight Champion; Former UFC Featherweight Champion
NIR	Norman Parke	Stormin	5–3–1	Bushmills, Northern Ireland	Bushmills, Northern Ireland San Diego, California By Way Of Bushmills, Northern Ireland Ballymoney, Northern Ireland	Next Generation Northern Ireland	14/12/2012	The Ultimate Fighter: The Smashes Winner

== Featherweights (145 lb, 65 kg) ==
ISO	Name	Nickname	UFC record	Birthplace	Fighting Out Of	Team	UFC Debut	Notes
IRE	Paul Redmond	Redser	0–2	Dublin, Ireland	Dublin, Ireland	Team Ryano	24/01/2015	Released from UFC November 2015

== Bantamweights (135 lb, 61 kg) ==
ISO	Name	Nickname	UFC record	Birthplace	Fighting Out Of	Team	UFC Debut	Notes
IRE	Caolan Loughran	The Don	2-2	Tyrone, Northern Ireland	Tyrone, Northern Ireland	Team Kaobon	02/09/2023	

== Flyweights (125 lb, 56 kg) ==
ISO	Name	Nickname	UFC record	Birthplace	Fighting Out Of	Team	UFC Debut	Notes
IRE	Patrick Holohan	The Hooligan	3–2	Dublin, Ireland	Tallaght, Dublin, Ireland Dublin, Ireland	SBG Ireland	19/07/2014	
IRE	Neil Seery	2Tap	3–4	Dublin, Ireland	Dublin, Ireland	Team Ryano	08/03/2014	

== Women's strawweights (115 lb, 52 kg) ==
ISO	Name	Nickname	UFC record	Birthplace	Fighting Out Of	Team	UFC Debut	Notes
IRE	Shauna Bannon	Mama B	2-2	Dublin, Ireland	Tallaght, Dublin, Ireland	Holohan Martial Arts	22/07/2023	
IRE	Aisling Daly	Ais the Bash	2–1	Dublin, Ireland	Dublin, Ireland	SBG Ireland	12/12/2014	First Irish Female To Compete In The UFC

== See also ==
- List of UFC champions
- List of current Bellator fighters
- List of current Invicta FC fighters
