= John Kavanagh (martial artist) =

Irish mixed martial arts coach and fighter

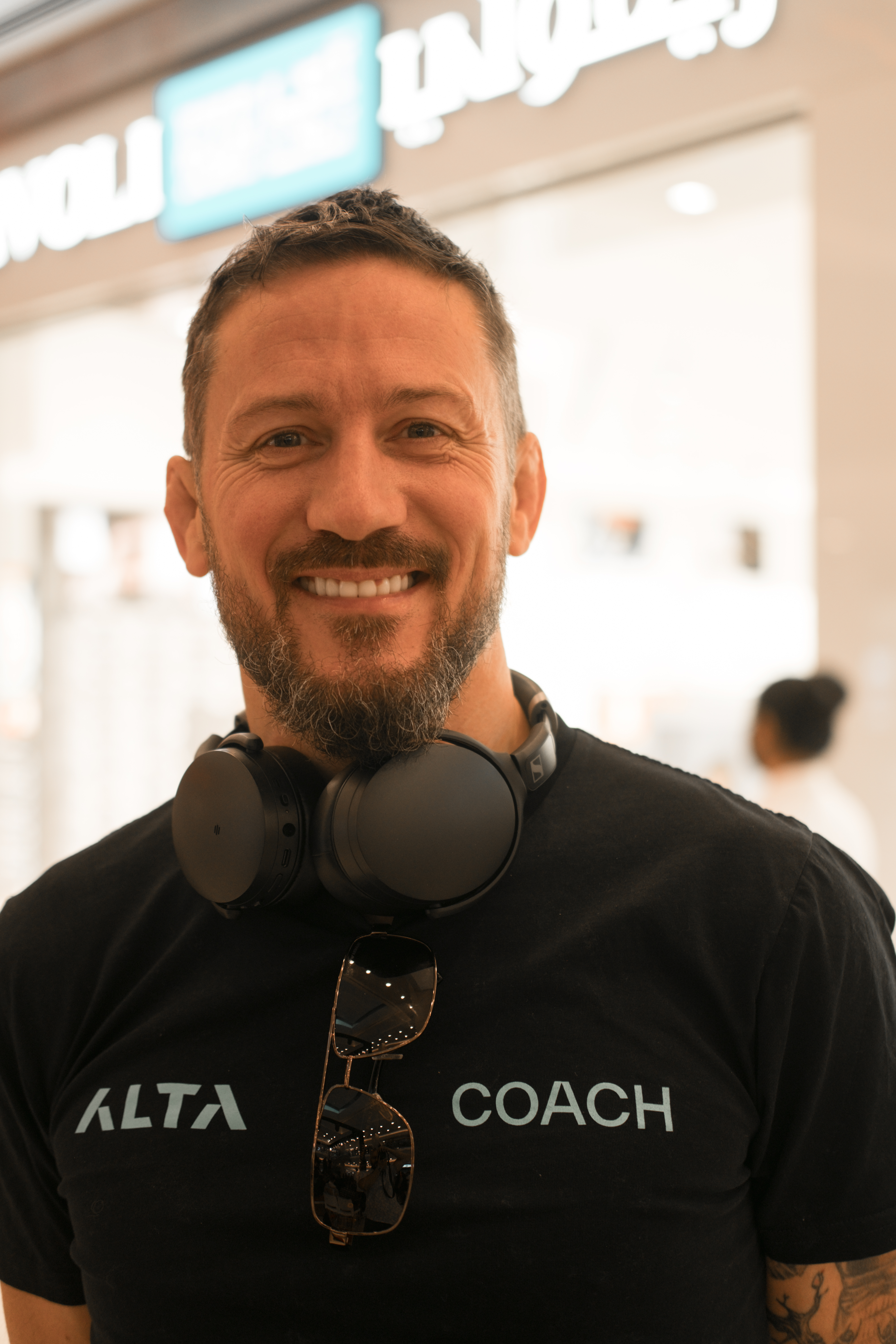
- Born: 18 January 1978 (age 48); Churchtown, Dublin, Ireland
- Height: 5 ft 9 in (175 cm)
- Weight: 154 lb (70 kg; 11 st 0 lb)
- Team: Straight Blast Gym Ireland
- Rank: 4th degree black belt in Brazilian Jiu-Jitsu under Matt Thornton; 2nd degree Black Belt in Kenpo Karate under Pat Conlon

Mixed martial arts record
- Total: 6
- Wins: 3
- By submission: 3
- Losses: 3
- By knockout: 1
- By submission: 1
- By decision: 1

Other information
- Occupation: Martial arts coach
- Mixed martial arts record from Sherdog

John Kavanagh (born 18 January 1978) is an Irish martial arts coach, Brazilian jiu-jitsu practitioner and former professional mixed martial artist. His students include fighters such as Conor McGregor, Makwan Amirkhani, and Gunnar Nelson.

== Background ==
He is the founder and head coach of Irish MMA gym Straight Blast Gym Ireland in Inchicore. He is the current president of the Irish Mixed Martial Arts Association. Kavanagh was inspired to take up mixed martial arts after watching footage of the UFC tournament in 1993. A pioneer of MMA in Ireland, he competed in some of the earliest local circuit MMA events in Ireland and the UK and is the first Irish man to receive a black belt in Brazilian jiu-jitsu. Kavanagh was welcomed into the Straight Blast Gym International association of gyms in 2001 by SBGi founder Matt Thornton.

Today, Kavanagh is known as one of the best MMA coaches in the world, being nominated for the World MMA Awards "Coach of the Year" in 2016, and winning it in 2017.

Kavanagh is also the promoter of a mixed martial arts organization Euro Fight Night which held their inaugural event in October 2019.

John Kavanagh is the current president of the Irish Amateur MMA Organisation, IMMMA.

== Awards and achievements ==
- World MMA Awards
  - 2017 The Shawn Tompkins Coach of the Year

== Mixed martial arts record ==
Professional record breakdown
6 matches	3 wins	3 losses
By knockout	0	1
By submission	3	1
By decision	0	1

Res.	Record	Opponent	Method	Event	Date	Round	Time	Location	Notes
Win	3–3	Robbie Oliver	Submission (armbar)	UZI 2: Combat Evolution	8 March 2003	1	2:26	Milton Keynes, England, United Kingdom	
Loss	2–3	Danny Batten	Submission (keylock)	UZI 1: Cage Combat Evolution	30 November 2002	2	N/A	Milton Keynes, England, United Kingdom	
Loss	2–2	Leigh Remedios	Decision (unanimous)	UC 1: Ultimate Combat 1	10 March 2002	3	5:00	Wiltshire, England, United Kingdom	
Win	2–1	Tamel Hasar	Submission (rear-naked choke)	Cage Wars 1	23 February 2002	1	N/A	Portsmouth, England, United Kingdom	
Loss	1–1	Bobby Karagiannidis	KO (punches)	Pride and Honor: Pride and Honor	24 November 2001	1	N/A	South Africa	
Win	1–0	Leighton Hill	Submission (triangle choke)	Grapple & Strike 1	29 May 2000	1	0:55	Worcester, England, United Kingdom	

== Instructor lineage ==
Kanō Jigorō → Tomita Tsunejirō → Mitsuyo "Count Koma" Maeda → Hélio Gracie → Rolls Gracie & Carlos "Carlinhos" Gracie Jr → Rigan Machado → Chris Haueter → Matt Thornton → John Kavanagh
