= Cage Contender =

Mixed martial arts promoter based in Belfast

- Company type: Private
- Industry: Mixed Martial Arts promotion
- Founded: 2009
- Founder: John Ferguson
- Headquarters: Belfast, Northern Ireland
- Key people: John Ferguson (Founder & CEO); Tom Murphy
- Parent: Ferguson Sports Group LT
- Website: http://cagecontender.com

Cage Contender is a European mixed martial arts promotion owned and operated by Belfast based Ferguson Sports Group LTD.

== History ==
The creation of Irish sports promoter John Ferguson, Cage Contender began as a knockout style tournament to be fought at a weight of 70–80 kg in The Cricket Club, Downpatrick, County Down, Northern Ireland. The six men were drawn by way of raffle to make up three first-round fights. The winners of these three fights progressed to the next round along with one of the losers who would be granted a golden ticket again by way of raffle. The winners of the two second-round fights would progress to the final and a winner crowned.

The fight card was made up of a mix of amateur undercard fights and the professional six-man tournament which was the main event. The main event was won by English fighter Aaron Lambourne who returned via the golden ticket system following a first-round loss after a battle with local man Mervyn Mullholland.

From the outset of the Cage Contender project Ferguson stated that he would first achieve a broadcast deal then go on to become the Irish market leader. Many thought that this was nonsense given that he had no experience within either the television or MMA industries. The first part of his claim became reality at Cage Contender 4 in May 2010 when Cage Contender was broadcast for the first time in Ireland and the UK.

Its status as Irish market leader was confirmed on 24 July 2010 when Cage Contender 5 became the biggest non UFC event ever in Ireland being broadcast in 56 countries while 3500 fans packed Dublin's National Basketball Arena to witness the biggest Bantamweight fight in European MMA history between Paul McVeigh and Artemij Sitenkov.

On 28 August 2010 Cage Contender had its first event outside Ireland when welterweights Gunnar Nelson and Danny Mitchell headlined Cage Contender 6 at the Altrincham Leisure Centre in Manchester, England.

Gunnar Nelson also headlined Cage Contender 12 against Alexander Butenko on 25 February 2012 at Dublins' National Basketball Arena. The fight made a milestone in Nelson's native country of Iceland as it was the first ever MMA event to be shown live on Icelandic television. The Nordic fans got to see Nelson submit Butenko in the first round and few months later sign a deal with the UFC.

Cage Contender was the first MMA promotion in Europe where fans were able to bet on the outcome of the fights in a historic team-up with Irish bookmaking chain Boyle Sports. This historic event led the way to more mainstream betting on MMA promotions in Europe.

Cage Contender features a mix of Irish talent combined with many UFC veterans to give wider commercial appeal.

In December 2012 Cage Contender returned to its tournament-style roots with the £10,000 Cage Contender Fight Stars event in Liverpool, England. This tournament was won by The Ultimate Fighter veteran and former Royal Marine Commando Martin Stapleton.

2013 saw Cage Contender sign international fighter Paul Daley to compete at Cage Contender 16 in Dublin, Ireland. Daley faced Frenchman Patrick Vallee and finished the fight by flying knee in the second round.

== Notable competitors ==
- Paul Daley
- Conor McGregor
- Gunnar Nelson
- Dean Lister
- Norman Parke
- Ivan Salaverry
- Paul McVeigh
- Shannon Gugerty
- Jeff Monson
- Patrick Holohan
- Neil Seery
- Cathal Pendred

== Champions ==
| Division | Weight limit | Champion |
|---|---|---|
| Heavyweight | 265 lbs | (England) Neil Wain |
| Light Heavyweight | 205 lbs | (South Africa) Fraser Opie |
| Middleweight | 185 lbs | (Republic of Ireland) Chris Fields |
| Welterweight | 170 lbs | (Iran) Ali Arish |
| Lightweight | 155 lbs | (Northern Ireland) Micky Doyle |
| Featherweight | 145 lbs | Vacant |
| Bantamweight | 135 lbs | Vacant |

== Rules ==
Cage Contender bouts are held under the Unified Rules of MMA

All Cage Contender bouts are competed over 3 x 5-minute rounds

== Results ==
Cage Contender Results from Sherdog.com

== TV coverage ==
Cage Contender events are currently broadcast live in over 100 territories globally through television partners including Sky Sports, Setanta Sports, The Fight Network, Fox Sports International, Fight Now TV and 365 Network (Stod2) reaching a potential audience of around 380 million homes.

In May 2013 Cage Contender agreed terms with global content distributor SPI International Polska which will see the brand available on airlines, cruise ships and in hotel chains worldwide across 5 continents.
