= Burnie (mascot) =

Mascot of the Miami Heat

Burnie is the mascot of the Miami Heat, the NBA basketball team since 1988. Burnie is a rough, anthropomorphic depiction of the fireball featured on the team's logo.

== Appearance ==
The Burnie costume is a full-body suit. The body is orange fur, while the "nose" is a green basketball. Burnie wears number 0 (or 00) for the Heat, typically in a black uniform, although he has also worn the Heat's red and white jerseys during playoff promotions. He also sometimes wears a white team T-shirt.

During the NBA Playoffs, in accord with the team's "White Hot Heat" Playoffs theme, Burnie's costume often changes to an all-white version of the same suit, with black trim around the jersey's text.

On June 10, 2023 Mixed martial artist Conor McGregor appeared at Game Four of the 2023 NBA Finals in Miami, Florida, to promote his pain relief spray in a planned skit with Burnie. McGregor proceeded to punch the man wearing the mascot costume once and then again when the man was on the ground, and subsequently the man was treated in a hospital emergency room. Most of the crowd in attendance booed McGregor for his actions. On June 13, three days after the incident, McGregor clarified that "it was a skit," and that "and all is well" between the two.

== Legal problems ==
Burnie was sued in 1994 during an exhibition game in Puerto Rico. Burnie selected a woman from the audience, dragged her by the feet, and danced on the court with her during a time-out. The woman turned out to be the wife of a federal judge. The woman pulled away from Burnie and fell. Burnie faced 20 years in jail after being charged with aggravated assault and battery. Burnie was also sued prior for US$1 million due to the emotional distress the woman went through. The media ridiculed the case, and she appeared several times on late-night television. The case was settled for $50,000.

Burnie's hijinks also led to another lawsuit in March 2015 and March 2017. On both occasions, people were injured by Burnie while he was performing. The same lawyer represented the two clients on the two occasions and both cases were settled. Both agreements remain confidential.
