= Straight Blast Gym Ireland =

Mixed martial arts academy and professional team based in Dublin

- Est.: 2001; 25 years ago
- Founded by: John Kavanagh
- Primary trainers: John Kavanagh (head coach); Philip Mulpeter (fitness); Sergey Pikulskiy (wrestling); Karl Cannon (Muay Thai); Tom King (Brazilian Jiu-Jitsu); Clive Staunton (Brazilian Jiu-Jitsu)
- Past titleholders: Conor McGregor; Ultimate Fighting Championship (Lightweight Champion: 2016-18); Ultimate Fighting Championship (Featherweight Champion: 2015-16); Cage Warriors Fighting Championship (Lightweight Champion: 2012-13); Cage Warriors Fighting Championship (Featherweight Champion: 2012-13); John Phillips; BAMMA (Middleweight Champion: 2016); Frans Mlambo; IMMAF World Championships (Featherweight Champion: 2015); Cathal Pendred; Cage Warriors Fighting Championship (Welterweight Champion: 2013); Luka Jelčić; Final Fight Championship (Lightweight Champion: 2016)
- Training facilities: Dublin, Ireland
- Website: sbgireland.com

Straight Blast Gym Ireland (also known as SBG Ireland) is a mixed martial arts academy and professional team based in Dublin, Ireland. It is run by John Kavanagh, and is part of Straight Blast Gym International. The team has produced several Ultimate Fighting Championship (UFC) fighters, the most notable being Conor McGregor.

== History ==
The gym was founded in 2001 by John Kavanagh, who was a black belt in karate. Later that year it became part of Matt Thornton's Straight Blast Gym International (SBGi), a worldwide association of over 35 gyms, after Kavanagh met Thornton at a tournament in Africa. After partnering with SBGi, Thornton awarded Kavanagh his Brazilian Jiu-Jitsu (BJJ) purple belt in 2002. Three years later, Kavanagh won gold at the 2005 European BJJ Championship. In 2007, he was awarded his BJJ black belt, making Kavanagh Ireland's first ever BJJ black belt in the process.

After 15 years at SBG Ireland, main striking coach Owen Roddy announced his departure in the end of November 2018.

== Ultimate Fighting Championship ==
In 2009, Tom Egan became SBG's first ever fighter to compete in the UFC. Egan lost to John Hathaway at UFC 93: Franklin vs. Henderson in Dublin. It wasn't until 2012 that SBG returned to the UFC, when Gunnar Nelson made his debut against DaMarques Johnson at UFC on Fuel TV: Struve vs. Miocic, winning via first-round rear-naked choke. The following year, Conor McGregor made his debut in Sweden. He defeated Marcus Brimage with a first-round knockout, and marked the beginning of a new era of success for the team.

At UFC 189 on 11 July 2015, SBG won their first UFC belt. In the main event of the evening, Conor McGregor had been booked to face José Aldo for the UFC Featherweight title. Aldo pulled out of the fight due to a rib injury however, meaning McGregor instead faced Chad Mendes for the interim title. McGregor won the fight via second-round TKO, on a card that also featured a loss and a victory for SBG fighters Cathal Pendred and Gunnar Nelson respectively.

At UFC 194, an event which set numerous records, Conor McGregor finally got the chance to become the undisputed UFC Featherweight champion, and unify his belt against José Aldo who had been undefeated for over ten years. It took McGregor only 13 seconds to KO the Brazilian, making it the fastest ever finish in a UFC championship match.

== The Ultimate Fighter ==
Following McGregor's interim title win at UFC 189, the UFC announced that he would be coaching against Urijah Faber in Season 22 of The Ultimate Fighter. In a "Europe vs USA" themed installment, McGregor was aided by his SBG coaches, Sergey Pikulskiy, Owen Roddy, Arkadiusz Sternalski and former SBG fighter Tom Egan who now coaches out of Peter Welch's Gym in Boston. Despite a slow start, Team Europe took six fighters into the quarter-finals, and then had three of the remaining four in the semi-finals. SBG's Artem Lobov was due to face England's Saul Rogers in an all-European Final, but visa issues saw Team USA's Ryan Hall replace Rogers in the season finale, where he utilized his superior grappling to great effect, and earned a unanimous decision victory over Lobov.

Status	Name	Weight Class	Information	Most Recent Promotion
Active	(Finland) Makwan Amirkhani	145 lb	Four-time Finnish medalist in Greco-Roman and Freestyle Wrestling.	Ultimate Fighting Championship
Active	(Argentina) Francisco Barrio	145 lb	Five-time international medalist in Greco-Roman Wrestling.	Konfrontacja Sztuk Walki
Active	(Netherlands) Ilias Bulaid	145 lb	World Champion in Kickboxing.	Bellator
Active	(Portugal) Mick Daly	145 lb	Former Bellator Featherweight title challenger.	Bellator
Active	(Republic of Ireland) Kiefer Crosbie	170 lb		Centurion Fight Championship
Retired	(Republic of Ireland) Aisling Daly	115 lb	Black Belt in Brazilian Jiu-Jitsu.	Ultimate Fighting Championship
Active	(United States) Dillon Danis	170 lb	Seven-time international medalist and Black belt in Brazilian Jiu-Jitsu.	Bellator
Active	(Republic of Ireland) James Gallagher	145 lb	Three-time European medalist and Brown belt in Brazilian Jiu-Jitsu.	Bellator
Active	(Netherlands) Hesdy Gerges	245 lb	Former World Champion in Kickboxing.	HIT
Retired	(Republic of Ireland) Patrick Holohan	125 lb	Black belt in Brazilian Jiu-Jitsu.	Ultimate Fighting Championship
Retired	(Croatia) Luka Jelčić	155 lb	Former FFC Lightweight Champion.	Retired
Active	(Canada) Brad Katona	145 lb	TUF: Undefeated Featherweight Champion and current Brave CF Bantamweight Champion	Brave Combat Federation
Active	(Republic of Ireland) Sinead Kavanagh	155 lb	IMMAF: World Championships silver medalist. / Former Bellator Women's Featherweight title challenger.	Bellator
Active	(Netherlands) Denise Kielholtz	125 lb	Current Bellator: Kickboxing Flyweight Champion.	Bellator
Active	(France) Taylor Lapilus	135-145 lb		Ultimate Fighting Championship
Active	(Russia) Artem Lobov	145 lb	TUF: Season 22 runner-up.	Bare Knuckle Fighting Championship
Active	(Republic of Ireland) Conor McGregor	145-170 lb	Former UFC Lightweight and Featherweight Champion / Former CWFC Lightweight and Featherweight Champion / Black belt in Brazilian Jiu-Jitsu.	Ultimate Fighting Championship
Active	(South Africa) Frans Mlambo	135 lbs	Copa Combate 2021 Winner	Combate Global
Active	(Republic of Ireland) Brian Moore	145 lb		Bellator
Active	(Iceland) Gunnar Nelson	170 lb	Four-time international medalist and Black belt in Brazilian Jiu-Jitsu / Black belt in Gōjū-ryū Karate.	Ultimate Fighting Championship
Retired	(Republic of Ireland) Cathal Pendred	170-185 lb	Former CWFC Welterweight Champion / Blue belt in Brazilian Jiu-Jitsu.	Ultimate Fighting Championship
Active	(France) Cédric Doumbé	170 lb	World Champion in Kickboxing.	Professional Fighters League
Active	(Poland) Paweł Polityło	135 lb		Konfrontacja Sztuk Walki
Active	(Republic of Ireland) Peter Queally	155 lb		Bellator
Retired	(Republic of Ireland) Owen Roddy	135-145 lb	Black belt in Brazilian Jiu-Jitsu	Cage Warriors
Active	(Italy) Daniele Scatizzi	145-170 lb	Black belt in Brazilian Jiu-Jitsu.	Bellator
Active	(Republic of Ireland) Richie Smullen	155 lb	TUF: Undefeated contestant.	Bellator
Active	(Republic of Ireland) Charlie Ward	185 lb		Bellator
Active	(Brazil) Johnny Walker	185-265 lb	Brown belt in Brazilian Jiu-Jitsu.	Ultimate Fighting Championship

== World MMA Awards ==
SBG and its team members have received various recognitions from The World MMA Awards:

Gym / Personnel

- 2014 Gym of the Year (nominated) SBG Concorde
- 2015 Coach of the Year (nominated) John Kavanagh
- 2015 Trainer of the Year (nominated) Ido Portal
- 2015 Gym of the Year (nominated) SBG Concorde
- 2016 Gym of the Year (nominated) SBG Concorde
- 2016 Coach of the Year (winner) John Kavanagh

Fighters

- 2013 Breakthrough Fighter of the Year (nominated) Conor McGregor
- 2013 International Fighter of the Year (nominated) Conor McGregor
- 2014 Comeback of the Year (nominated) Cathal Pendred vs. Mike King
- 2014 International Fighter of the Year (winner) Conor McGregor
- 2015 Knockout of the Year (nominated) Conor McGregor vs. José Aldo
- 2015 International Fighter of the Year (winner) Conor McGregor
- 2015 Fighter of the Year (winner) Conor McGregor
- 2016 Fighter of the Year (winner) Conor McGregor

== Gyms ==
While John Kavanagh's gym remains SBG Ireland's official headquarters, the association has added new branches with gyms across the country. The current gyms are as follows (see https://www.sbgireland.com/affiliate-sbg-gyms/):

- SBG Belfast

Joys Entry, Belfast, Antrim.

- SBG Cork City

North Point Business Park, Blackpool, Cork.

- SBG Ireland (HQ)

SBG Ireland HQ Unit 13, Goldenbridge Industrial Estate Inchicore Dublin 8 D08 WK22

- SBG Clonmel

Cashel Road Industrial Estate, Clonmel, Tipperary

- SBG Killarney

Mangerton View, Killarney, Kerry

- SBG Ballina

Bunree Road, Bunree, Ballina, Mayo

- SBG Evolution

Kilcruttin Business Park, Tullamore, Offaly

- SBG Strabane

Riverside Leisure Centre, Strabane, Tyrone

== See also ==
- List of professional MMA training camps
