= UFC 194 =

UFC mixed martial arts event in 2015

UFC 194: Aldo vs. McGregor
- The poster for UFC 194: Aldo vs. McGregor
- Promotion: Ultimate Fighting Championship
- Date: December 12, 2015
- Venue: MGM Grand Garden Arena
- City: Las Vegas, Nevada
- Attendance: 16,516
- Total gate: $10,006,249
- Buyrate: 1,200,000

Event chronology
The Ultimate Fighter: Team McGregor vs. Team Faber Finale	UFC 194: Aldo vs. McGregor	UFC on Fox: dos Anjos vs. Cowboy 2

UFC 194: Aldo vs. McGregor was a mixed martial arts event held by the Ultimate Fighting Championship on December 12, 2015, at the MGM Grand Garden Arena in Las Vegas, Nevada.

== Background ==
The event was originally scheduled to take place on December 5. However, the MGM Grand Garden Arena had already been booked for an Andrea Bocelli concert, prompting the UFC to look at alternative venues such as the Mandalay Bay Events Center. The AT&T Stadium in Arlington, Texas was the most relevant venue under consideration, which would likely have made the event the highest attended in the promotion's history. Subsequently, on August 10, UFC president Dana White confirmed the event would take place at the MGM Grand Garden Arena, albeit one week later on December 12.

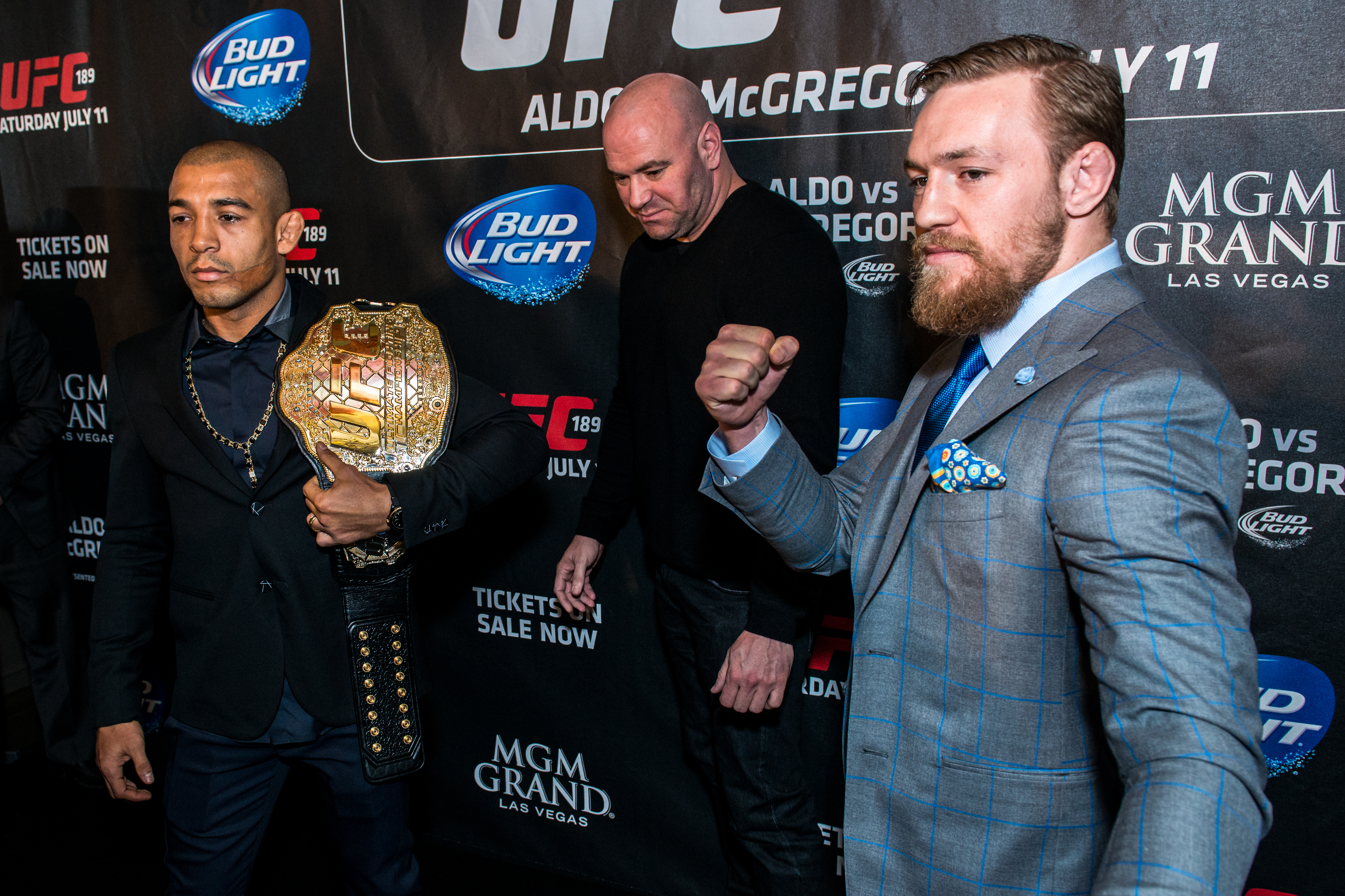
McGregor (right), Dana White (middle) and José Aldo (left) prior to the UFC 189 press conference in March 2015.

This event marked the first time the UFC has ever scheduled three events in consecutive days, with all of them taking place in Las Vegas. Instead of the MGM Grand Garden Arena, the other two events were held at The Chelsea at The Cosmopolitan.

The event was headlined by a UFC Featherweight Championship unification bout between then champion José Aldo and then interim champion Conor McGregor. The bout was originally expected to take place at UFC 189. However, Aldo pulled out of the bout due to a rib injury and the event was instead headlined by an interim title bout between McGregor and Chad Mendes.

The co-main event featured a UFC Middleweight Championship bout between then undefeated champion Chris Weidman and former Strikeforce Middleweight champion Luke Rockhold.

A middleweight bout between Ronaldo Souza and Yoel Romero was originally booked for UFC 184 and later UFC on Fox: Machida vs. Rockhold. However, the bout was cancelled both times due to Souza being struck with pneumonia and Romero pulling out due to a ligament and meniscus tear in his knee, respectively. The fight was later rescheduled for this event.

Michelle Waterson was expected to face Tecia Torres at the event. However, Waterson pulled out of the bout on November 24 citing an injury. She was replaced by promotional newcomer Jocelyn Jones-Lybarger.

On January 13, Romero was informed of a potential doping violation stemming from an out of competition test conducted by USADA. On February 8, Romero and his manager explained that he took a supplement after his fight and that supplement turned out to be contaminated. His team and USADA both sent out the supplement for testing and it came back that it contained a banned substance. That substance was not listed on the label, his manager said. They did not want to reveal the name of the supplement or the substance, because USADA was investigating the issue. On March 23, it was announced that Romero would appeal his suspension. His team and USADA discussed a deal for a nine-month suspension for the fighter, but Romero preferred to go to arbitration. The typical USADA anti-doping violation suspension is two years. Eventually on April 4, both parts reached an agreement for a six-month suspension. USADA revealed that Romero tested positive for ibutamoren, a growth hormone release stimulator. The supplement was tested and the banned substance did indeed come up, even though it was not listed on the label. Romero announced that he'll pursue legal action against the supplement company within the next few weeks. The result of the fight was not disqualified or overturned.

== McGregor vs. Aldo fight ==
Before the opening of the first round, they refused to touch gloves and went immediately into combat. As the fight started, McGregor took control of the center of the octagon. When Aldo got within his range, McGregor threw a straight left hand to keep Aldo away. The punch did not hit its target. McGregor then followed with a leg kick that connected. As Aldo charged forward to connect with a right-left punch combination, McGregor moved backwards and connected with a left hook that landed on Aldo's chin and rendered him unconscious. Both punches connected, but McGregor's left punch landed first. As Aldo fell to the ground, McGregor connected with two hammer fists until the referee (Big John McCarthy) stepped in to stop the fight. When the fight was over, McGregor leaped atop the fence and celebrated his victory. Within a minute, Aldo regained consciousness and was on his feet. The bout lasted 13 seconds. The knockout was the fastest finish in UFC title fight history. “Again, nobody can take that left-hand shot,” said McGregor in the post-fight interview. “[Aldo's] powerful and he's fast. But precision beats power, and timing beats speed. And that’s what you saw there.”

== Results ==
Main Card
Weight class				Method	Round	Time	Notes
Featherweight	Conor McGregor (ic)	def.	José Aldo (c)	KO (punch)	1	0:13	(Note: For the UFC Featherweight Championship.)
Middleweight	Luke Rockhold	def.	Chris Weidman (c)	TKO (punches)	4	3:12	(Note: For the UFC Middleweight Championship.)
Middleweight	Yoel Romero	def.	Ronaldo Souza	Decision (split) (29–27, 28–29, 29–28)	3	5:00
Welterweight	Demian Maia	def.	Gunnar Nelson	Decision (unanimous) (30–26, 30–25, 30–25)	3	5:00
Featherweight	Max Holloway	def.	Jeremy Stephens	Decision (unanimous) (30–27, 30–27, 29–28)	3	5:00
Preliminary Card (Fox Sports 1)
Bantamweight	Urijah Faber	def.	Frankie Saenz	Decision (unanimous) (29–28, 29–28, 30–27)	3	5:00
Women's Strawweight	Tecia Torres	def.	Jocelyn Jones-Lybarger	Decision (unanimous) (30–27, 30–27, 30–27)	3	5:00
Welterweight	Warlley Alves	def.	Colby Covington	Submission (guillotine choke)	1	1:26
Lightweight	Leonardo Santos	def.	Kevin Lee	TKO (punches)	1	3:26
Preliminary Card (UFC Fight Pass)
Lightweight	Magomed Mustafaev	def.	Joe Proctor	TKO (knees and punches)	1	1:54
Lightweight	Yancy Medeiros	def.	John Makdessi	Decision (split) (29–28, 28–29, 29–28)	3	5:00
Welterweight	Court McGee	def.	Márcio Alexandre Jr.	Decision (unanimous) (30–27, 29–28, 29–28)	3	5:00

== Bonus awards ==
The following fighters were awarded $50,000 bonuses:

- Fight of the Night: Luke Rockhold vs. Chris Weidman
- Performance of the Night: Conor McGregor and Leonardo Santos

== Reported payout ==
The following is the reported payout to the fighters as reported to the Nevada State Athletic Commission. It does not include sponsor money and also does not include the UFC's traditional "fight night" bonuses.

- Conor McGregor: $500,000 (no win bonus) def. José Aldo: $400,000
- Luke Rockhold: $160,000 (includes $80,000 win bonus) def. Chris Weidman: $275,000
- Yoel Romero: $150,000 (includes $25,000 win bonus) def. Ronaldo Souza: $135,000
- Demian Maia: $156,000 (includes $78,000 win bonus) def. Gunnar Nelson: $75,000
- Max Holloway: $90,000 (includes $45,000 win bonus) def. Jeremy Stephens: $43,000
- Urijah Faber: $300,000 (includes $150,000 win bonus) def. Frankie Saenz: $20,000
- Tecia Torres: $24,000 (includes $12,000 win bonus) def. Jocelyn Jones-Lybarger: $10,000
- Warlley Alves: $42,000 (includes $21,000 win bonus) def. Colby Covington: $18,000
- Leonardo Santos: $40,000 (includes $20,000 win bonus) def. Kevin Lee: $21,000
- Magomed Mustafaev: $24,000 (includes $12,000 win bonus) def. Joe Proctor: $13,000
- Yancy Medeiros: $42,000 (includes $21,000 win bonus) def. John Makdessi: $30,000
- Court McGee: $48,000 (includes $24,000 win bonus) def. Marcio Alexandre Jr.: $12,000

== See also ==
- List of UFC events
- 2015 in UFC
