= Gunnar Nelson (fighter) =

Icelandic mixed martial artist (born 1988)

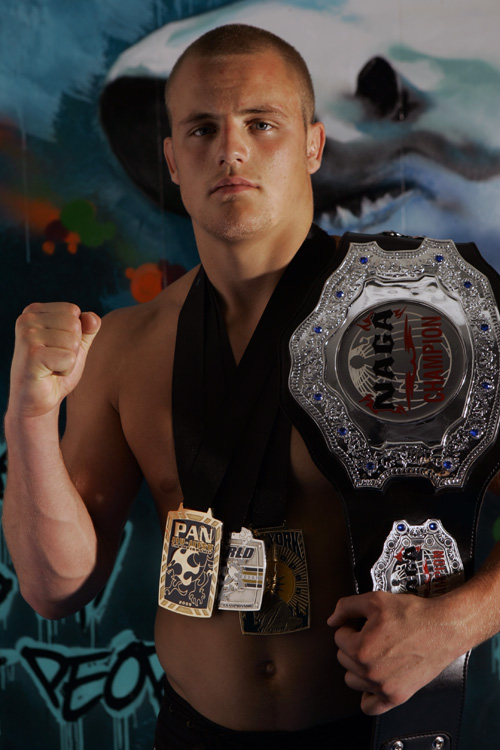
- Gunnar Nelson
- Born: Gunnar Lúðvík Nelson; 28 July 1988 (age 38); Akureyri, Iceland
- Nickname: Gunni
- Height: 5 ft 11 in (180 cm)
- Weight: 170 lb (77 kg; 12 st 2 lb)
- Division: Welterweight
- Reach: 72 in (183 cm)
- Style: Brazilian Jiu-Jitsu
- Stance: Orthodox
- Fighting out of: Reykjavík, Iceland
- Team: Mjölnir; SBG Ireland
- Rank: Black belt in Gōjū-ryū Karate; 3rd degree black belt in Brazilian Jiu-Jitsu under Renzo Gracie
- Years active: 2007–present

Mixed martial arts record
- Total: 26
- Wins: 19
- By knockout: 4
- By submission: 13
- By decision: 2
- Losses: 6
- By knockout: 1
- By decision: 5
- Draws: 1

Other information
- Website: gunnarnelson.com
- Mixed martial arts record from Sherdog

Gunnar Nelson
Medal record

Representing Iceland

Grappling

World Jiu-Jitsu Championship (Gi)
Silver medal – second place	2009	Middleweight (Brown)

Pan American Championship (Gi)
Gold medal – first place	2009	Middleweight (Brown)

Pan American Championship (No-Gi)
Gold medal – first place	2009	Middleweight (Black)
Silver medal – second place	2009	Absolute (Black)

Gunnar Lúðvík Nelson (born 28 July 1988) is an Icelandic professional mixed martial artist, currently competing in the Welterweight division of the Ultimate Fighting Championship. He is a black belt in Brazilian Jiu-Jitsu, which was awarded by Renzo Gracie after impressive results at the 2009 IBJJF Pan-Ams and the 2009 ADCC Submission Wrestling World Championship. Nelson is a member of Mjölnir MMA in Iceland, and SBG Ireland.

== Background ==
=== Early life ===
Gunnar was born on 28 July 1988, in Akureyri in the north side of Iceland but has lived in Reykjavík, the capital of Iceland, almost all his life from early childhood. He played football and ice hockey in his childhood years. At the age of 13, he started training in Gōjū-ryū Karate and won the Icelandic Juvenile Kumite Championship title in 2003, and again in 2004 and 2005. He took home medals in every karate tournament he participated in from 2003 to 2005. In 2005, he was chosen as Iceland's most promising up-and-coming karate talent of that year, when he was just 16. However, he gave up karate to train in Brazilian Jiu-Jitsu and grappling at age 17. Gunnar's father, Haraldur Dean Nelson (aka Halli Nelson), is of Anglo-American and Icelandic descent. He is also Gunnar's manager. Gunnar's mother, Guðrún Hulda Gunnarsdóttir Nelson, is Icelandic. Gunnar has one sibling, a sister named María Dögg Nelson, born in 1992 in Reykjavík. María is an actress in their home country of Iceland.

=== Brazilian Jiu-Jitsu ===
Gunnar began grappling in 2006, receiving his Brazilian Jiu-Jitsu (BJJ) blue belt from Matt Thornton of Straight Blast Gym International. From the age of 17, he continued his tutelage primarily under John Kavanagh, one of Thornton's students. Gunnar first met Kavanagh during one of his BJJ seminars at Mjolnir, and the SBG Ireland owner would remain his head coach until this day. By 2008, Gunnar had already progressed far enough for Kavanagh to award him his brown belt, but with Kavanagh not being a black belt for more than six years at the time, he was unable to award Gunnar his own black belt under IBJJF rules. Gunnar subsequently spent a period at Renzo Gracie Academy in New York to advance rank to black belt. Shortly after his arrival, he had competed for their team in various competitions, winning a silver medal in the 2009 Mundials brown belt category. He also won gold at the 2009 Pan American Championship (Gi), along with gold and silver (open class) in the 2009 Pan American Championship (No-Gi). At the 2009 ADCC Submission Wrestling World Championship, Gunnar took 4th place in the absolute category where he defeated the much heavier and touted BJJ Black Belts Jeff Monson and David Avellan. Gracie had already seen enough, and awarded him his black belt after less than a year with his academy. In 2011, Gunnar was again offered a place in the ADCC Submission Wrestling World Championship and had a good run (though not bringing home any medals), defeating the then present and twofold European Champion and multiple Finnish champion Marko Helen and the Brazilian and American champion and former World Champion Bruno Frazzato.

Today, Gunnar is an instructor in his home club Mjolnir. He spends his time between there, SBG Ireland, Renzo Gracie Academy, and also SBG Mainline in Manchester.

== Mixed martial arts career ==
=== Early career ===
In May 2007, Gunnar fought in mixed martial arts for the first time, in Copenhagen, Denmark. The fight was against Danish fighter John Olesen. The judges ruled the bout a draw.

Gunnar won five more fights in the 16 months following his debut, in Ireland, the United Kingdom and Denmark, before taking a break from the sport for almost two years. He returned at BAMMA 2: Roundhouses at the Roundhouse in February 2010 and defeated opponent Sam Elsdon via submission in the first round. He secured another first round victory in his next fight against Danny Mitchell at Cage Contender 6 in Manchester, England before returning to BAMMA later that year. His next appearance was at BAMMA 4: Reid vs. Watson in September 2010 where he faced previously unbeaten British prospect Eugene Fadiora and won by submission in the first round. In February 2012, Gunnar returned to MMA with a first round armbar submission win over Ukrainian fighter Alexander Butenko at Cage Contender 12 in Dublin Ireland. In late 2012 Gunnar signed a multi-fight agreement with the UFC.

=== Ultimate Fighting Championship ===
Nelson signed a multifight contract with the UFC in July 2012. He's the first fighter from Iceland to fight for the company.

Nelson was expected to make his promotional debut against Pascal Krauss on September 29, 2012, at UFC on Fuel TV: Struve vs. Miocic. However, Krauss was forced out of the bout with an injury (Rich Attonito was shortly linked to fighting Gunnar but he had weight concerns and also pulled out) and Gunnar was expected to face DaMarques Johnson at a catchweight bout of 175 lb, but his opponent could not make the required weight. The fight was contested at 183 lbs (Gunnar weighed in at 175 lbs). Gunnar submitted Johnson via rear-naked choke at the 3:34 mark of the first round.

Nelson was expected to face Justin Edwards on February 16, 2013, at UFC on Fuel TV: Barão vs. McDonald. However, Edwards was forced to pull out of the bout citing an injury, and was replaced by returning veteran Jorge Santiago. Gunnar won the fight by unanimous decision (29–28, 29–28, and 30–27).

Nelson was expected to face Mike Pyle on May 25, 2013, at UFC 160. However, Gunnar pulled out of the bout citing an injury and was replaced by Rick Story.

A year later Nelson returned to the UFC and faced Omari Akhmedov on March 8, 2014, at UFC Fight Night 37. Gunnar won the fight via submission in the first round. The win also earned him his first Performance of the Night bonus award.

Nelson was expected to face Ryan LaFlare on July 19, 2014, at UFC Fight Night 46. LaFlare suffered an injury and was replaced by Zak Cummings. Gunnar won the fight via second round rear-naked choke. The victory secured his second Performance of the Night bonus award.

Nelson next faced Rick Story on October 4, 2014, in the main event at UFC Fight Night 53. Gunnar lost the fight via split decision.

Nelson was expected to face John Hathaway on July 11, 2015, at UFC 189. However, Hathaway pulled out of the bout on June 23 citing injury, and was replaced by Brandon Thatch. Gunnar won the fight by submission due to a rear naked choke in round one after dropping Thatch with a left-right hand combo.

Nelson was briefly linked to a fight with Demian Maia on October 24, 2015, at UFC Fight Night 76, but the bout did not materialize for that event as Maia was sidelined with a staph infection on his left leg. The bout eventually took place on December 12, 2015, at UFC 194. Gunnar lost the one-sided fight via unanimous decision.

Nelson faced Albert Tumenov on May 8, 2016, at UFC Fight Night 87. He won the fight via submission in the second round, and earned his third Performance of the Night bonus.

Nelson was expected to face Dong Hyun Kim on November 19, 2016, at UFC Fight Night 99. However, on October 21, it was announced that Gunnar had pulled out due to an injury and the fight was off. Kim was rescheduled to face Tarec Saffiedine on December 30, 2016, at UFC 207.

Nelson faced Alan Jouban on March 18, 2017, at UFC Fight Night 107. After rocking Jouban with a punch, Gunnar secured a guillotine choke to win by submission in the second round. He was awarded a Performance of the Night bonus.

Nelson faced Santiago Ponzinibbio on July 16, 2017, at UFC Fight Night 113. He lost the fight by knockout in the first round. At the post-fight press conference, Gunnar claimed that Ponzinibbio poked him in the eye during one of the earlier exchange and caused him see double: "And I really should have said something because I was seeing double for the rest of the fight. He caught me with a shot that I didn’t really see." Ponzinibbio dismissed Gunnar's claim and stated, "I went there to knock him out and thank God it went as expected, I won by knockout. If (the eye poke) happened, of course it wasn’t intentional, but I watched the video again and didn’t see it." However pictures from the fight clearly show that Ponzinibbio poked Gunnar's eyes number of times in the fight. After the fight, Gunnar appealed his loss, as the referee had failed to stop the fight due to eye pokes under the Unified Rules of MMA; his appeal was denied by UFC.

Nelson was expected to face Neil Magny on May 27, 2018, at UFC Fight Night 130. However, it was reported on April 28, 2018, that he was pulled from the event due to knee injury.

Nelson faced Alex Oliveira on December 8, 2018, at UFC 231. He won the fight via a rear-naked choke after opening a brutal cut with an elbow in round two.

Nelson faced Leon Edwards on March 16, 2019, at UFC Fight Night 147. He lost the fight via split decision.

Nelson was expected to face Thiago Alves on September 28, 2019, at UFC Fight Night 160. However, Alves pulled out of the fight in mid-September due to undisclosed injury, and he was replaced by Gilbert Burns. He lost the fight via unanimous decision.

As the first fight of his new multi-fight contract, Nelson was expected to return from extended hiatus and face Cláudio Silva on March 19, 2022, at UFC Fight Night 204. However, Silva pulled out in early March due to a knee injury and he was replaced by Takashi Sato. Gunnar won the fight via unanimous decision.

Nelson was scheduled to face Daniel Rodriguez on March 18, 2023, at UFC 286. However, Rodriguez withdrew from the event for undisclosed reasons and he was replaced by Bryan Barberena. Nelson won the fight via armbar submission in the first round. He was awarded a Performance of the Night bonus for the finish.

After a two-year hiatus from competing, Nelson faced Kevin Holland on March 22, 2025, at UFC Fight Night 255. He lost the fight by unanimous decision.

Nelson was rescheduled to face Neil Magny on July 19, 2025, at UFC 318. However, two weeks prior to the event, it was reported that he had to withdraw from the fight due to a hamstring injury.

== View on mixed martial arts practices ==
=== Weight cutting ===
Throughout his career, Gunnar has never engaged in extensive weight cutting. His training weight is around 175–176 pounds (79–80 kg), necessitating only a 5–6-pound (2.3–2.7 kg) weight cut. He has been a big proponent of instituting strict rules against weight cutting, arguing that the practice is dangerous to the fighters and counterproductive to the UFC, as it leads to fights being cancelled or fought at catch weight.

=== Wraps and gloves ===
Gunnar fights and spars without wraps on his hands and uses small gloves. He has said that he would fight without any gloves if it were possible. He maintains that minimal wraps and gloves give him a better feel of what he's doing with his hands. Wraps and gloves are intended to protect fighters' hands, but Gunnar notes that he has never broken his hands.

== Personal life ==
Gunnar has three children, a son and two daughters. His son was born on May 30, 2014, whose mother is Icelandic artist, Auður Ómarsdóttir. Gunnar and his girlfriend, Fransiska Björk Hinriksdóttir, who is a clinical psychologist, have two daughters, born on October 31, 2019, and August 13, 2023.

== Championships and accomplishments ==
=== Mixed martial arts ===
- Ultimate Fighting Championship
  - Performance of the Night (Five times) vs. Omari Akhmedov, Zak Cummings, Albert Tumenov, Alan Jouban, and Bryan Barberena
  - Most submission wins in UFC Welterweight division history (7)
  - Tied (Frank Mir and Islam Makhachev) for eighth most submission wins in UFC history (8)
  - Highest significant strike accuracy in UFC Welterweight division history (60.5%)
  - UFC.com Awards
    - 2012: Ranked #8 Newcomer of the Year
    - 2015: Ranked #9 Submission of the Year vs. Brandon Thatch
- Nordic MMA Awards - MMAviking.com
  - 2012 Breakthrough Fighter of the Year
  - 2015 Submission of the Year vs. Brandon Thatch
  - 2018 Submission of the Year vs. Alex Oliveira

=== Grappling ===
- North American Grappling Association
  - NAGA Middleweight Champion (One time)
- International Brazilian Jiu-Jitsu Federation
  - 2009 IBJJF World Jiu-Jitsu Championship Middleweight Brown Belt Gi Silver Medalist
  - 2009 IBJJF Pan American Championship Middleweight Brown Belt Gi Gold Medalist
  - 2009 IBJJF Pan American Championship Middleweight Black Belt No Gi Gold Medalist
  - 2009 IBJJF Pan American Championship Absolute Black Belt No Gi Silver Medalist

== Mixed martial arts record ==
Professional record breakdown
26 matches	19 wins	6 losses
By knockout	4	1
By submission	13	0
By decision	2	5
Draws	1	

Res.	Record	Opponent	Method	Event	Date	Round	Time	Location	Notes
Loss	19–6–1	Kevin Holland	Decision (unanimous)	UFC Fight Night: Edwards vs. Brady	March 22, 2025	3	5:00	London, England	
Win	19–5–1	Bryan Barberena	Submission (armbar)	UFC 286	March 18, 2023	1	4:51	London, England	Performance of the Night.
Win	18–5–1	Takashi Sato	Decision (unanimous)	UFC Fight Night: Volkov vs. Aspinall	March 19, 2022	3	5:00	London, England	
Loss	17–5–1	Gilbert Burns	Decision (unanimous)	UFC Fight Night: Hermansson vs. Cannonier	September 28, 2019	3	5:00	Copenhagen, Denmark	
Loss	17–4–1	Leon Edwards	Decision (split)	UFC Fight Night: Till vs. Masvidal	March 16, 2019	3	5:00	London, England	
Win	17–3–1	Alex Oliveira	Submission (rear-naked choke)	UFC 231	December 8, 2018	2	4:17	Toronto, Ontario, Canada	
Loss	16–3–1	Santiago Ponzinibbio	KO (punches)	UFC Fight Night: Nelson vs. Ponzinibbio	July 16, 2017	1	1:22	Glasgow, Scotland	
Win	16–2–1	Alan Jouban	Submission (guillotine choke)	UFC Fight Night: Manuwa vs. Anderson	March 18, 2017	2	0:46	London, England	Performance of the Night.
Win	15–2–1	Albert Tumenov	Submission (neck crank)	UFC Fight Night: Overeem vs. Arlovski	May 8, 2016	2	3:15	Rotterdam, Netherlands	Performance of the Night.
Loss	14–2–1	Demian Maia	Decision (unanimous)	UFC 194	December 12, 2015	3	5:00	Las Vegas, Nevada, United States	
Win	14–1–1	Brandon Thatch	Submission (rear-naked choke)	UFC 189	July 11, 2015	1	2:54	Las Vegas, Nevada, United States	
Loss	13–1–1	Rick Story	Decision (split)	UFC Fight Night: Nelson vs. Story	October 4, 2014	5	5:00	Stockholm, Sweden	
Win	13–0–1	Zak Cummings	Submission (rear-naked choke)	UFC Fight Night: McGregor vs. Brandão	July 19, 2014	2	4:48	Dublin, Ireland	Performance of the Night.
Win	12–0–1	Omari Akhmedov	Submission (guillotine choke)	UFC Fight Night: Gustafsson vs. Manuwa	March 8, 2014	1	4:36	London, England	Performance of the Night.
Win	11–0–1	Jorge Santiago	Decision (unanimous)	UFC on Fuel TV: Barão vs. McDonald	February 16, 2013	3	5:00	London, England	
Win	10–0–1	DaMarques Johnson	Submission (rear-naked choke)	UFC on Fuel TV: Struve vs. Miocic	September 29, 2012	1	3:34	Nottingham, England	Catchweight (175 lb) bout; Johnson missed weight (183 lb).
Win	9–0–1	Alexander Butenko	Submission (armbar)	Cage Contender 12	February 25, 2012	1	4:21	Dublin, Ireland	
Win	8–0–1	Eugene Fadiora	Submission (neck crank)	BAMMA 4	September 25, 2010	1	3:51	Birmingham, England	
Win	7–0–1	Danny Mitchell	Submission (rear-naked choke)	Cage Contender 6	August 28, 2010	1	2:51	Manchester, England	
Win	6–0–1	Sam Elsdon	Submission (rear-naked choke)	BAMMA 2	February 13, 2010	1	2:30	London, England	
Win	5–0–1	Iran Mascarenhas	KO (punch)	Adrenaline 3	September 6, 2008	2	3:22	Copenhagen, Denmark	
Win	4–0–1	Barry Mairs	TKO (punches)	Angrrr Management 14	December 9, 2007	1	3:38	London, England	
Win	3–0–1	Niek Tromp	TKO (punches)	Cage of Truth 1	November 24, 2007	1	1:50	Dublin, Ireland	
Win	2–0–1	Adam Slawinski	TKO (punches)	Ultimate Fighting Revolution 10	October 6, 2007	1	2:30	Galway, Ireland	
Win	1–0–1	Driss El Bakara	Submission (armbar)	Cage Rage Contenders: Dynamite	September 29, 2007	1	3:46	Dublin, Ireland	
Draw	0–0–1	John Olesen	Draw (split)	Adrenaline 1	May 5, 2007	3	5:00	Copenhagen, Denmark	

== Grappling record ==
14 Matches, 8 Wins (4 Submissions), 6 Losses (1 Submission)
Result	Rec.	Opponent	Method	Event	Division	Date	Location
Loss	8-6	(Brazil) Alexandre Ribeiro	Points	ADCC World Championship	Absolute	September 25, 2011	(United Kingdom) Nottingham
Win	8-5	(Brazil) Bruno Frazzato	Points	ADCC World Championship	Absolute	September 25, 2011	(United Kingdom) Nottingham
Loss	7-5	(Brazil) André Galvão	Points	ADCC World Championship	-88 kg	September 24, 2011	(United Kingdom) Nottingham
Win	7-4	(Finland) Marko Helen	Points	ADCC World Championship	-88 kg	September 24, 2011	(United Kingdom) Nottingham
Win	6-4	(Iceland) Bjarni Kristjánsson	Submission (guillotine choke)	Mjolnir Open	Absolute	September 3, 2011	(Iceland) Reykjavík
Win	5-4	(Iceland) Brynjólfur Ingvarsson	Submission (armbar)	Mjolnir Open	Absolute	September 3, 2011	(Iceland) Reykjavík
Win	4-4	(United Kingdom) Mike Russell	Submission (rear naked choke)	Health & Fitness Expo	Superfight	November 20, 2010	(Iceland) Reykjavík
Loss	3-4	(United States) Azunna Anyanwu	Points	Grapplers Quest: Beast of the East	Absolute	March 20, 2010	(United States) Caldwell, NJ
Win	3-3	(United States) Ronnie Mikvenski	Points	Grapplers Quest: Beast of the East	Absolute	March 20, 2010	(United States) Caldwell, NJ
Loss	2-3	(Brazil) Vinny Magalhães	Points	ADCC World Championship	Absolute	September 27, 2009	(Spain) Barcelona
Loss	2-2	(Brazil) Alexandre Ribeiro	Submission (kneebar)	ADCC World Championship	Absolute	September 27, 2009	(Spain) Barcelona
Win	2-1	(United States) David Avellan	Submission (rear naked choke)	ADCC World Championship	Absolute	September 27, 2009	(Spain) Barcelona
Win	1-1	(United States) Jeff Monson	Points	ADCC World Championship	Absolute	September 27, 2009	(Spain) Barcelona
Loss	0-1	(United States) James Brasco	Referee Decision	ADCC World Championship	-88 kg	September 26, 2009	(Spain) Barcelona

== Instructor lineage ==
Kano Jigoro → Tomita Tsunejiro → Mitsuyo Maeda → Carlos Gracie, Sr. → Helio Gracie → Rolls Gracie → Carlos Gracie, Jr. → Renzo Gracie → Gunnar Nelson

== See also ==
- List of current UFC fighters
- List of male mixed martial artists
