= Conor McGregor =

Irish mixed martial artist (born 1988)

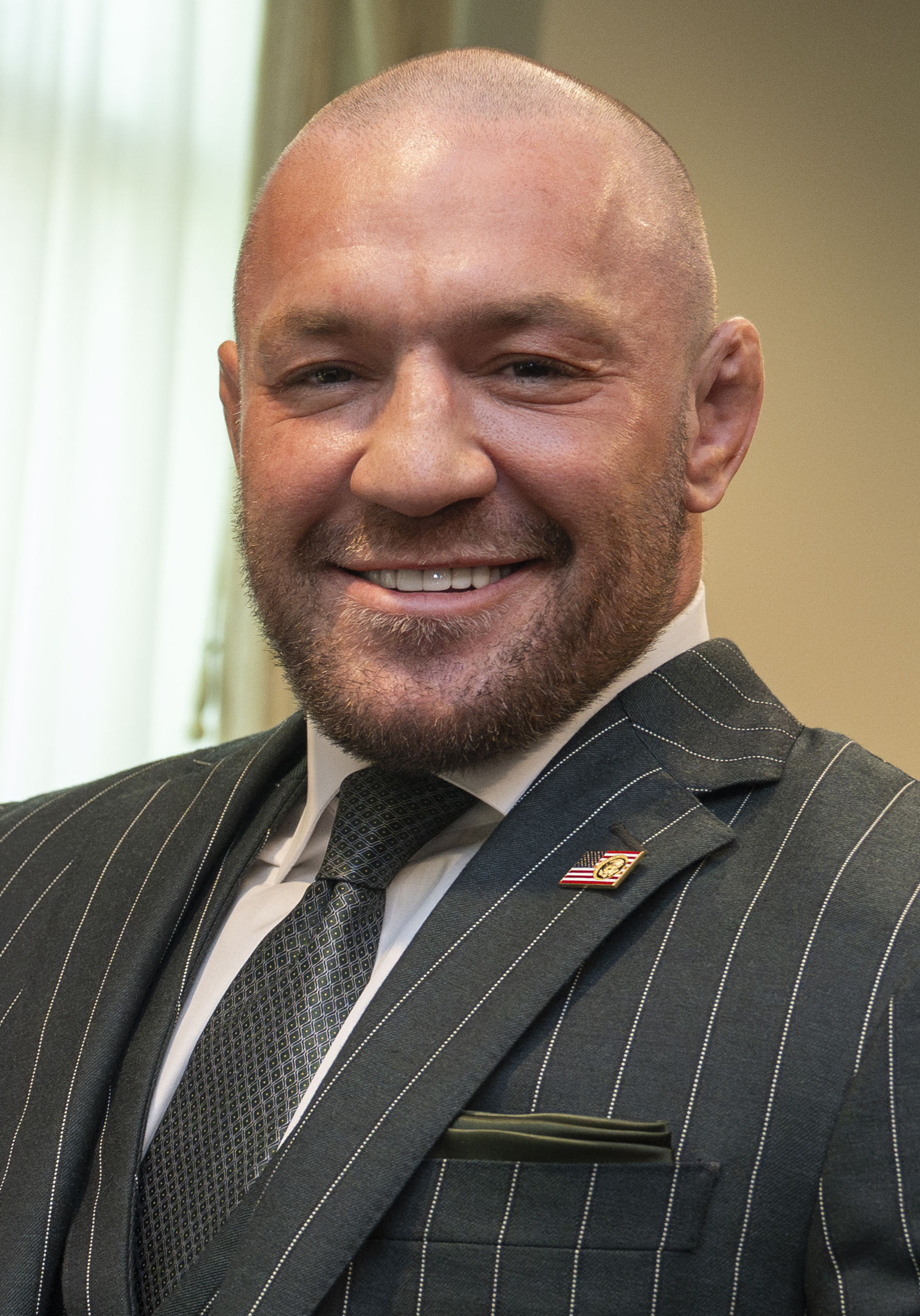
- McGregor in 2025
- Born: Conor Anthony McGregor; 14 July 1988 (age 38); Dublin, Ireland
- Other name: Notorious
- Occupations: Mixed martial artist; businessman
- Criminal charges: 20+, including driving offences and assault
- Spouse: Dee Devlin (m. 2025)
- Children: 4
- Relatives: Keith Buckley (cousin); Warren Davis (cousin)
- Martial arts career
- Height: 5 ft 8 in (173 cm)
- Weight: 170 lb (77 kg; 12 st 2 lb)
- Division: Featherweight (2008–2015); Lightweight (2008–2012, 2016–2018, 2021-present); Welterweight (2016, 2020, 2026)
- Reach: 74 in (188 cm)
- Stance: Southpaw
- Team: SBG Ireland
- Trainer: John Kavanagh (head coach); Owen Roddy, Raj Vrînceanu (Boxing); Sergey Pikulskiy (Wrestling); John Connor (S&C); George Lockhart (Nutrition)
- Rank: Black belt in Brazilian jiu-jitsu under John Kavanagh
- Years active: 2008–present

Professional boxing record
- Total: 1
- Wins: 0
- Losses: 1
- By knockout: 1

Mixed martial arts record
- Total: 29
- Wins: 22
- By knockout: 19
- By submission: 1
- By decision: 2
- Losses: 7
- By knockout: 3
- By submission: 4

Amateur record
- Total: 1
- Wins: 1
- By knockout: 1
- Losses: 0

Other information
- Mixed martial arts record from Sherdog
- Website: conormcgregor.com

Conor Anthony McGregor (born 14 July 1988) is an Irish professional mixed martial artist. He is a former Ultimate Fighting Championship (UFC) Featherweight and Lightweight Champion, becoming the first fighter to hold UFC championships in two weight classes simultaneously. He is also a former simultaneous Cage Warriors Fighting Championship (CWFC) Featherweight and Lightweight Champion.

In 2008, McGregor began competing professionally in mixed martial arts (MMA), fighting in the lightweight and featherweight divisions. He won the CWFC Featherweight and Lightweight Championships in 2012 before signing with the UFC in 2013. After five consecutive wins, he won the Interim Featherweight Championship by defeating Chad Mendes at UFC 189. He became the undisputed Featherweight Champion at UFC 194 after knocking out José Aldo in 13 seconds, which is the fastest finish in UFC title fight history. In 2016, he won the UFC Lightweight Championship at UFC 205 by defeating Eddie Alvarez. He transitioned briefly to professional boxing, facing Floyd Mayweather Jr. in a highly publicised bout, which he lost via TKO in the 10th round. He returned to MMA and challenged for the UFC Lightweight Championship at UFC 229, losing to Khabib Nurmagomedov via submission.

McGregor is the biggest pay-per-view (PPV) draw in MMA history, having headlined the five highest-selling UFC PPV events. His fight against Nurmagomedov at UFC 229 drew 2.4 million PPV buys, the most ever for an MMA event. His 2017 boxing match against Mayweather generated over 5.3 million buys across the United States and the United Kingdom, making it the second highest-selling pay-per-view event in history. McGregor was ranked as the world's highest-paid athlete by Forbes in 2021, earning a reported $180 million. He also appeared on the list in 2018, ranking fourth with earnings of $99 million. Outside of fighting, McGregor has pursued business ventures, including in the alcoholic beverage industry, and is a co-owner of the Bare Knuckle Fighting Championship (BKFC), a bare-knuckle boxing promotion.

McGregor has been involved in multiple legal issues, including civil and criminal cases. He has faced charges for assault, disorderly conduct, driving offences and rape. His comments on the 2023 Dublin riots and immigration policy in Ireland have also caused controversy. In November 2024, an Irish High Court ruled in a civil case that he had assaulted and raped a woman in 2018, ordering him to pay over €248,000 in damages. In December 2024, he was ordered to pay the victim's legal costs, amounting to approximately €1,500,000. In July 2025, he lost an appeal on the verdict. Following the 2024 civil court ruling, McGregor lost several sponsorship and partnership deals.

In March 2025, McGregor announced his intention to stand as an independent candidate in the 2025 Irish presidential election and has expressed views dubbed anti-immigration, far-right, and national populist. On 14 September, he withdrew from the election.

== Early life ==
Conor Anthony McGregor was born in Dublin, Ireland, to parents Tony and Margaret McGregor. Tony is from Liverpool, and was born to an English mother and Irish father. He was raised in Crumlin and attended Irish-language schools — the Gaelscoil Scoil Mológa, in Harold's Cross, at primary level, and Gaelcholáiste Coláiste de hÍde in Tallaght at secondary level, where he also developed his passion for sport, playing football.

In his youth, he played football for Lourdes Celtic Football Club. At the age of 12, he also began boxing at Crumlin Boxing Club, as a way to defend himself against bullies and raise his confidence.

When McGregor was 13, the family moved to Lucan, Dublin, where he attended Gaelcholáiste Coláiste Cois Life. At the urging of his parents, he commenced a plumbing apprenticeship for a year, but found the job difficult and uninteresting. While in Lucan, he met future UFC fighter Tom Egan and they soon started training mixed martial arts (MMA) together. Among his inspirations growing up were Naseem Hamed, Muhammad Ali and Bruce Lee.

== Amateur mixed martial arts career ==
On 17 February 2007, at the age of 18, McGregor made his mixed martial arts debut in an amateur fight against Kieran Campbell for the Irish Ring of Truth promotion in Dublin. He won via technical knockout (TKO) in the first round. Following the fight, he turned professional and was signed by the Irish Cage of Truth promotion. In 2008, McGregor began training at the Straight Blast Gym (SBG) in Dublin under John Kavanagh.

== Professional mixed martial arts career ==
=== Early career (2008–2013) ===
On 9 March 2008, McGregor had his first professional MMA bout, as a lightweight, defeating Gary Morris with a second-round TKO. After McGregor won his second fight against Mo Taylor, he made his featherweight debut in a loss via kneebar against submission specialist Artemij Sitenkov. After a victory at featherweight in his next bout against Stephen Bailey, McGregor contemplated a different career path before his mother contacted his coach John Kavanagh and reinvigorated him to continue pursuing mixed martial arts.

McGregor then won his next fight, also at featherweight, against Connor Dillon, before moving back to lightweight for a fight against Joseph Duffy, in which he received his second professional loss after submitting to an arm triangle choke. Following this, during 2011 and 2012, McGregor went on an eight-fight winning streak, during which he won both the CWFC Featherweight and Lightweight championships, making him the first European professional mixed martial artist to hold titles in two divisions simultaneously.

In February 2013, UFC president Dana White made a trip to Dublin, Ireland to receive a Gold Medal of Honorary Patronage from Trinity College's student Philosophical Society and was inundated with requests to sign McGregor to the UFC. After a meeting with McGregor and talking with UFC CEO Lorenzo Fertitta, White offered him a contract days later.

=== Ultimate Fighting Championship (2013–present) ===
==== 2013 ====
In February 2013, the Ultimate Fighting Championship (UFC) announced that they had signed McGregor to a multi-fight contract. In joining, he became only the second fighter from Ireland to compete for the company, following team member Tom Egan.

On 6 April 2013, McGregor made his UFC debut against Marcus Brimage at UFC on Fuel TV: Mousasi vs. Latifi. He won the fight by knockout in round one. The win also earned McGregor his first "Knockout of the Night" award.

McGregor was expected to face Andy Ogle on 17 August 2013 at UFC Fight Night 26, but Ogle pulled out of the bout citing an injury and was replaced by eventual UFC Featherweight Champion Max Holloway. McGregor won the fight by unanimous decision (30–27, 30–27, 30–26). Following the bout with Holloway, an MRI scan revealed that McGregor had torn his anterior cruciate ligament (ACL) during the bout and would require surgery, keeping him out of action for up to ten months.

==== 2014 ====
McGregor was expected to face Cole Miller on 19 July 2014, at UFC Fight Night 46 in his comeback bout after recovering from his ACL injury. However, Miller pulled out of the bout citing a thumb injury and was replaced by Diego Brandão. McGregor fought Brandão in front of a crowd of 9,500 at The O2 in Dublin, Ireland. The fight was officially halted by referee Leon Roberts at 4:05 of the first round. The win earned McGregor his first Performance of the Night award.

Prior to his next bout, McGregor met with Lorenzo Fertitta and signed a new multi-fight contract with the UFC. McGregor next faced Dustin Poirier on 27 September 2014, at UFC 178. Despite McGregor landing only 9 significant strikes to Poirier's 10, he managed to secure a victory early on in the first round, by pressuring Poirier onto his back foot, before exploding with a left hook behind Poirier's ear, forcing referee Herb Dean to step in to end the fight. The finish officially came at 1:46 into the first round. This marked Poirier's first UFC loss via KO/TKO and earned McGregor his second straight "Performance of the Night" award.

==== 2015 ====
===== Championship pursuits =====
McGregor faced Dennis Siver on 18 January 2015 at UFC Fight Night 59. He won the fight via TKO in the second round. The victory also earned McGregor his third straight "Performance of the Night" award.

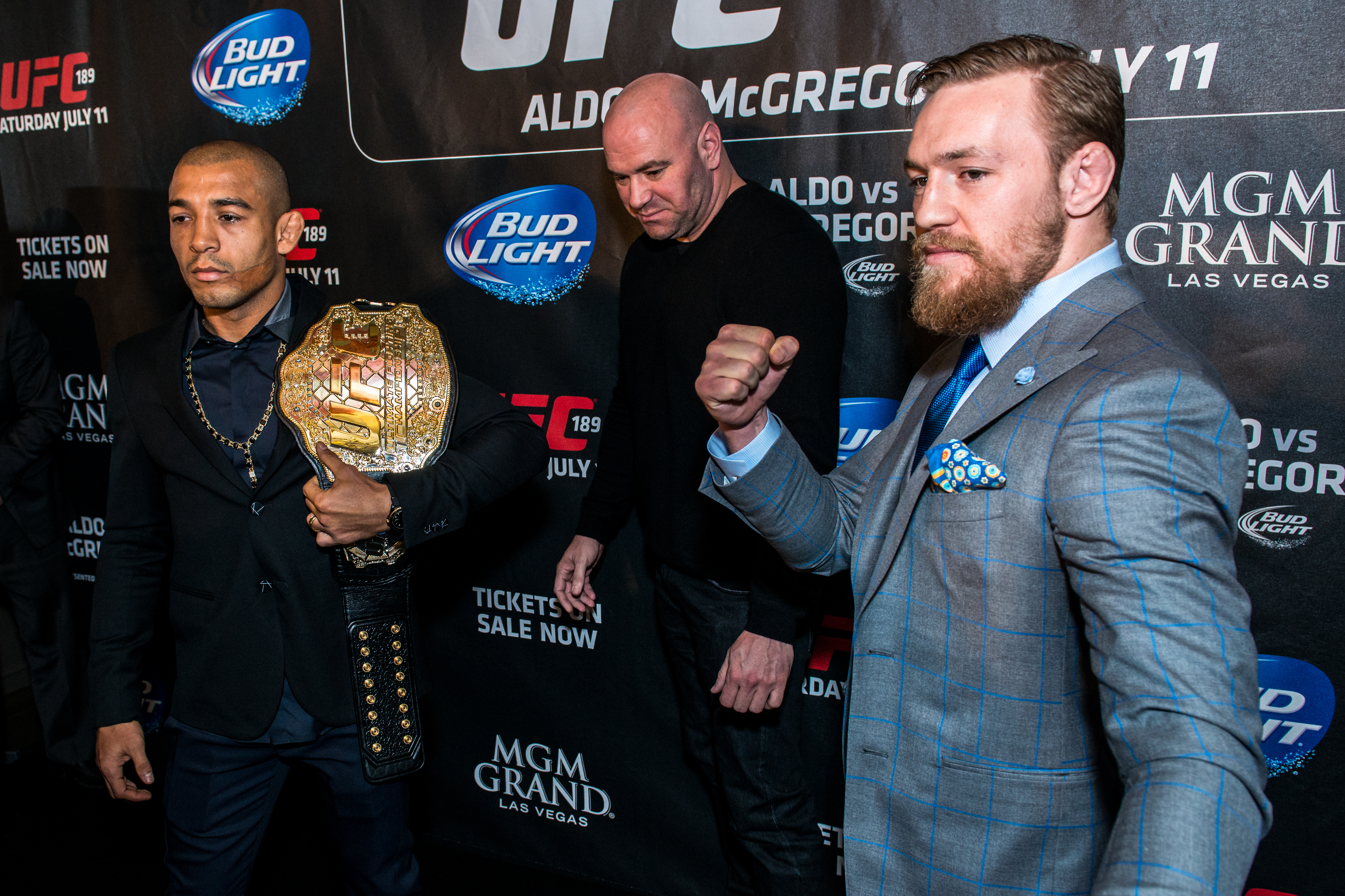
McGregor (right), Dana White (middle) and José Aldo (left) in London as part of the World Tour promoting UFC 189 in March 2015

===== Interim Featherweight Championship bout =====
The highly anticipated bout with Aldo was announced on 30 January 2015, at the UFC 183 Q&A. McGregor declared that he was expected to face Aldo on 11 July 2015 at UFC 189 for the undisputed UFC Featherweight Championship, during the UFC's annual International Fight Week. The fight took place at the MGM Grand Garden Arena in Las Vegas, Nevada. The UFC, confident that the fight would exceed expectations, increased the promotional budget for the event, with company Dana White stating that "[the UFC] spent more money promoting Aldo–McGregor than any fight in UFC history."

With the fight against Aldo announced both McGregor and Aldo would embark on a 12-day world tour, during which eight cities in five countries were visited, including Aldo's home country of Brazil (Rio de Janeiro) and McGregor's hometown of Dublin. The tour began in Rio de Janeiro on 20 March and ended in Dublin on 31 March. However, on 23 June, it was reported that Aldo had suffered a rib fracture and had pulled out of the bout as a consequence. McGregor remained on the card and was rescheduled to face Chad Mendes for the Interim Featherweight Championship. The official attendance for the event, 16,019, broke the record in Nevada, while the gate of $7,200,000 broke the record for a mixed martial arts event in the United States. Prior to the fight, McGregor's entrance song, "The Foggy Dew", was sung live by Irish singer-songwriter Sinéad O'Connor. McGregor won the fight via TKO, winning the UFC Interim Featherweight Championship.

McGregor then took part in UFC's The Ultimate Fighter, in which he coached against Urijah Faber. Faber's team member Ryan Hall ended up winning the competition.

===== Featherweight Championship unification bout =====
On 10 August, it was announced that the event would take place on 12 December at UFC 194, when McGregor would face José Aldo for the UFC Featherweight Championship. At the weigh-ins, both McGregor and Aldo achieved the weight limit of 145 pounds. McGregor knocked out Aldo thirteen seconds into the first round with a left hook, ending his seven-year-long WEC and UFC title reign and eighteen-fight win streak to claim the title, earning the "Performance of the Night" bonus as well. This finish marked the fastest knockout in a title bout in UFC history.

==== 2016 ====
===== First UFC loss =====
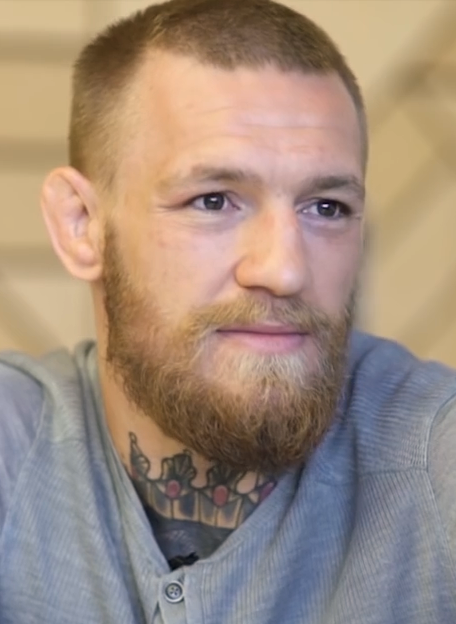
McGregor in 2016

McGregor was expected to challenge Rafael dos Anjos for the UFC Lightweight Championship on 5 March. However, it was announced on 23 February that dos Anjos had been forced out of the championship fight after breaking his foot during training. Instead McGregor faced The Ultimate Fighter Season 5 winner and former UFC Lightweight Championship challenger Nate Diaz in a welterweight bout at UFC 196. On 24 February 2016, a press conference was held to help promote the new main event, with both men trading insults. At the Thursday pre-fight press conference on 3 March, McGregor and Diaz engaged in a brief scuffle during a face-off, after McGregor landed a strike on Diaz's lead hand.

The fight began with combination in the first round, Diaz returned fire with two consecutive hooks, one a slap, a signature of Nate and his brother, Nick Diaz, termed the "Stockton Slap". McGregor had success with his bodywork, but Diaz began to land combinations of his own. After a one-two punch from Diaz, McGregor attempted a double leg takedown, which Diaz defended by sprawling. Diaz then threatened the guillotine choke, which forced McGregor onto his back after stopping McGregor from scrambling and Diaz secured the mount and secured a rear naked choke. McGregor tapped to the submission at 4:12 into the second round. Both competitors were awarded "Fight of the Night" bonuses, and McGregor received the highest disclosed purse of any fighter in the history of the company to that point, at $1,000,000. McGregor was critical of his own performance while praising Diaz, saying "I was inefficient with my energy. It was a battle of energy and he got the better of that."

===== Rematch with Nate Diaz =====
A rematch with Diaz was scheduled for 9 July at UFC 200; however, on 19 April, the UFC announced that McGregor had been pulled from the event after failing to fulfil media obligations related to the fight. In turn, the fight with McGregor was rescheduled and took place the following month, contested again at welterweight, at UFC 202. McGregor won the rematch via majority decision (48–47, 47–47, 48–47). The bout was once again awarded "Fight of the Night" honours. The event broke the record previously held by UFC 100 for the highest selling pay-per-view in UFC history, with 1,650,000 buys.

===== Two–division champion =====
On 27 September, it was officially announced that McGregor's next bout would be against Eddie Alvarez for the UFC Lightweight Championship on 12 November at UFC 205. After dropping Alvarez multiple times throughout the first round, McGregor landed a multiple-punch combination to stop his opponent via technical knockout in the second round. This result marked the first time a competitor had held UFC championships in two different weight classes, and it also repeated McGregor's feat during his career at Cage Warriors. This win earned McGregor the "Performance of the Night" and is widely considered one of his best performances inside the octagon.

===== Stripping of Featherweight Championship =====
On 26 November, due to his inactivity in the division, it was initially announced that McGregor had vacated the Featherweight Championship, therefore promoting José Aldo to undisputed champion. McGregor's coach, however, confirmed further reports which stated that McGregor had actually been stripped of the title.

==== 2017 ====
After winning the lightweight championship at UFC 205, McGregor announced he would take time off from the UFC to wait for the birth of his first child due in 2017. McGregor spent the majority of his public appearances in early-2017 campaigning for a boxing match with Floyd Mayweather Jr. After months of negotiations, the two finally came to terms on 14 June 2017 and announced the match to take place on 26 August. The match ultimately ended in the 10th round with a victory by TKO for Mayweather.

==== 2018 ====
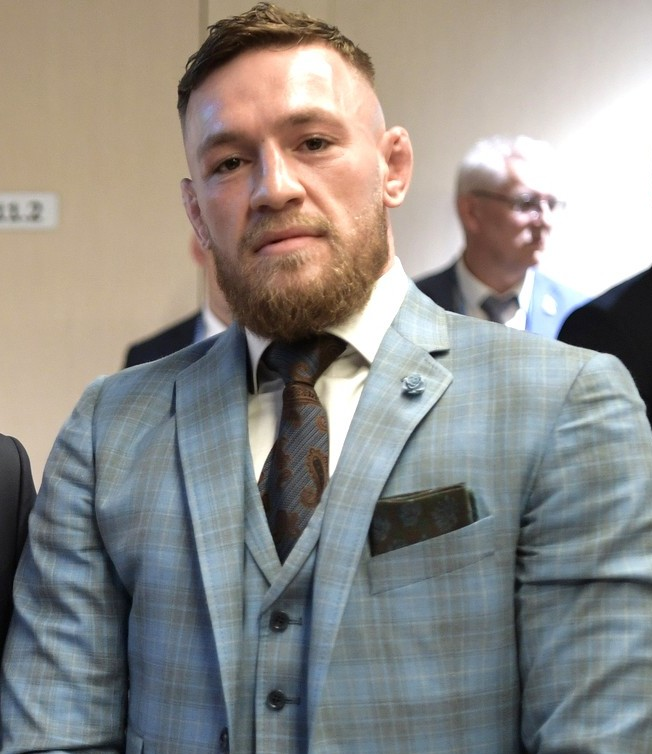
McGregor in 2018

After the conclusion of UFC 223 on 7 April, McGregor was stripped of the UFC Lightweight Championship due to inactivity and Khabib Nurmagomedov was crowned the undisputed champion after defeating Al Iaquinta at the event.

On 3 August, it was announced that McGregor would return to the octagon for the first time since November 2016 at UFC 229 to challenge the undefeated Khabib Nurmagomedov for the UFC Lightweight Championship on 6 October. This bout was considered one of the biggest contests in the history of the sport and it was filled with pre-fight hype. Nurmagomedov submitted McGregor with a neck crank in the fourth round.

==== 2019 ====
On 26 March 2019, McGregor announced his retirement on social media. However, Dana White viewed this announcement as a ploy to secure an ownership stake in the company, with White later suggesting his retirement would not last and that he had been in regular contact with him and stated he would fight again in the future. McGregor had previously tweeted that he wanted a rematch with Khabib Nurmagomedov and that he would see him in the Octagon.

==== 2020 ====
After over a year away from the Octagon, McGregor faced Donald Cerrone in a welterweight bout on 18 January 2020 at UFC 246. He won the fight via technical knockout 40 seconds into the first round. This win earned him a Performance of the Night award. The win made McGregor the first UFC fighter to hold knockout finishes in the featherweight, lightweight and welterweight divisions. On 6 June 2020, McGregor announced once more that he was retiring from fighting.

==== 2021 ====
Despite talks of retirement, McGregor was booked to face former UFC Lightweight Championship challenger Dustin Poirier in a rematch of their 2014 bout at UFC 257 on 24 January 2021. He lost the fight via technical knockout in the second round, marking the first knockout loss in his career. McGregor was later handed a 6–month medical suspension after the knockout.

McGregor faced Poirier for a third time on 10 July 2021 at UFC 264. McGregor lost the fight via technical knockout in round one after the ringside doctor stopped the bout. McGregor had rolled his ankle while stepping back, resulting in a broken lower tibia which rendered him unable to continue.

==== 2023–2024 ====
After the layoff nursing his leg injury, McGregor coached The Ultimate Fighter 31 for the second time with the opposing coach being Michael Chandler. Filming of the show started in February 2023 and aired on television from May to August 2023. The show led to McGregor being scheduled to fight in a welterweight bout against Chandler at UFC 303 on 29 June 2024. Following speculation on the fight's status due to an abruptly cancelled press conference, the UFC officially announced the fight's cancellation on 13 June 2024, citing an injury (broken toe) sustained by McGregor.

==== 2025 ====
On 7 October 2025, it was announced that McGregor had failed to disclose his whereabouts for drug testing on three occasions in 2024. As a result, he was given an eighteen-month suspension, retroactive to the date of his failure. His 18-month suspension ended in March 2026, and he is currently eligible to compete.

==== 2026 ====
After a five-year hiatus, McGregor made his return and rematched Max Holloway in a welterweight bout in the main event on 11 July 2026 at UFC 329. He lost the fight via technical knockout due to a knee injury, one minute and nine seconds into the first round.

On 19 July, McGregor stated that he had suffered a torn meniscus and ACL.

== Fighting style ==
McGregor is known mostly as a counter-striker and prefers to fight standing up, as opposed to on the ground. He is known for his striking precision and knockout power. McGregor is left-handed and primarily fights out of the southpaw stance but often switches to an orthodox stance. He will frequently try to be the aggressor in his bouts. McGregor's boxing is typically considered his best skill, with the majority of his victories coming by way of knockout or technical knockout via punches. Many pundits cite McGregor's pull-back left-handed counter as his most dangerous strike.

McGregor's signature style off arena is to repeatedly engage in trash talk and "psychological warfare" against his opponents, which has led to earning him the moniker 'The Notorious', and has brought comparisons with Muhammad Ali, whom McGregor cites as one of his early inspirations. After Ali died in June 2016, McGregor opined that "nobody will ever come close to [Ali's] greatness". McGregor has also cited Bruce Lee as an inspiration, and compared himself to Lee. During the buildup to his bout against Donald Cerrone and the rematch against Dustin Poirier, McGregor was respectful towards his opponents and refrained from trash talking. However, McGregor heavily used trash talk in the buildup to his trilogy fight with Poirier.

== Professional boxing match ==
On 14 June 2017, it was announced that McGregor would compete in his first professional boxing match against the undefeated Floyd Mayweather Jr., on 26 August 2017 at T-Mobile Arena in Paradise, Nevada. The fight was broadcast on Showtime PPV in the US and Sky Sports Box Office in the UK. The bout was contested at super welterweight (154 pounds) with 8 oz. gloves. The fight was expected to be the richest in boxing history.

On 24 August 2017, it was announced that Mayweather and McGregor would compete for the WBC Money Belt. According to the Nevada State Athletic Commission, Mayweather would earn a guaranteed purse of $100 million, and McGregor was guaranteed $30 million. The match resulted in Mayweather winning via TKO in the 10th round, with the scorecards reading 87–83, 89–82, 89–81, all in favour of Mayweather. The Nevada State Athletic Commission announced the live gate for the event was $55,414,865.79 from 13,094 tickets sold. Given the success in pay-per-views, Mayweather reportedly earned around $280 million overall, while McGregor came out with earning $130 million.

== Charges and controversies ==
=== Driving offences ===
In November 2017 McGregor pleaded guilty to exceeding the speed limit in Rathcoole, County Dublin. He was fined €400. In November 2018 he pleaded guilty to speeding in Kill, County Kildare, and was fined €1,000 and disqualified from driving for six months.

On 22 March 2022, McGregor was arrested in Dublin and charged with six driving offences, including two counts of dangerous driving, being uninsured, having no licence and failing to produce his documents. His car was seized by the Gardaí. He was released on bail, his car was returned to him, and he was scheduled to appear before Blanchardstown district court in April 2022.

On 23 June 2022, McGregor appeared in Blanchardstown District Court in relation to events on 22 March 2022. He was remanded on continuing bail pending "further charges" as part of a dangerous driving prosecution. He had not yet indicated a plea and the judge remanded him to appear on 8 September 2022 for directions from the Director of Public Prosecutions. On 8 September he was charged with an additional charge of careless driving, adding to the six charges he already faced over the incident: two charges of dangerous driving, two of allegedly driving with no license or insurance and two of failing to produce either a licence or insurance. The trial was originally set to begin in January 2023, but McGregor's defence told the court that he could not attend the trial then due to being unwell. The judge ordered the trial to start on 31 July 2024. In July 2024 he was given a two-year driving ban and a five-month suspended sentence, on condition that he keeps the peace for two years.

=== Accusations of racism ===
Ahead of his 2015 bout with Brazilian fighter José Aldo, McGregor was accused of racially taunting Aldo.

In 2017, McGregor was accused of racism, after taunting boxer Floyd Mayweather Jr. ahead of their 26 August boxing match. McGregor told him to "Dance for me, boy," at a promotional event in Los Angeles, before urging the crowd to yell obscenities at Mayweather, his wife and children.

=== Florida arrest ===
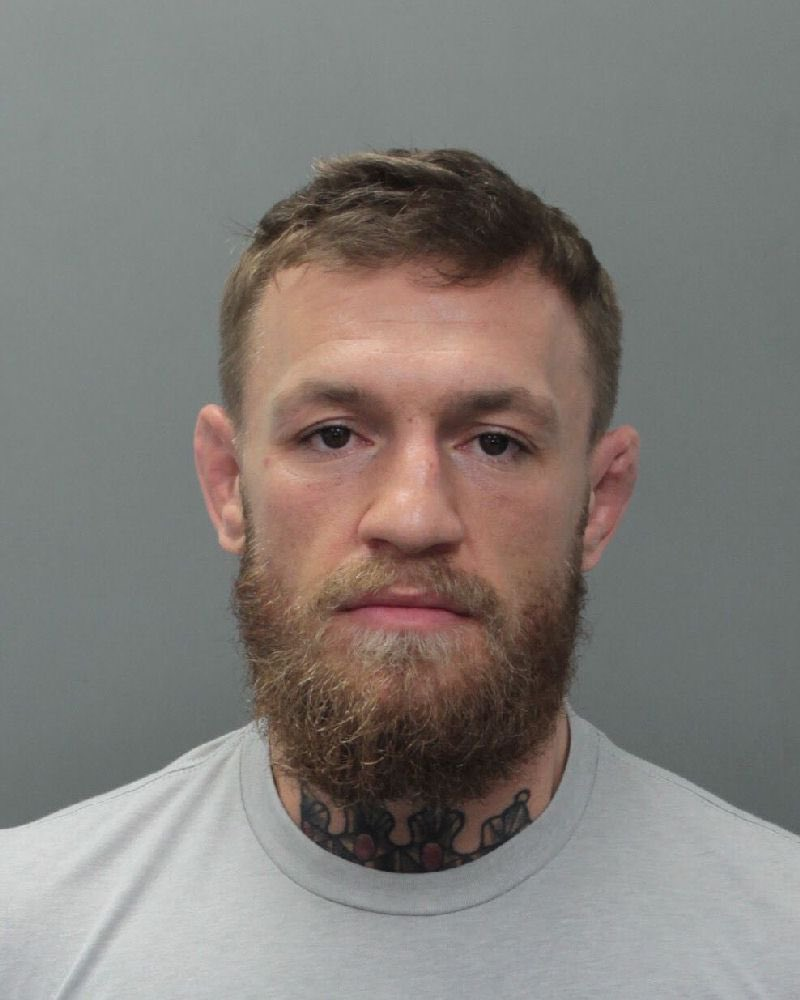
McGregor's March 2019 mugshot

On 11 March 2019, McGregor was arrested outside of the Fontainebleau Hotel in Miami Beach, Florida, after he attacked a fan taking a picture on his mobile phone. In an incident that was caught on a security camera, McGregor lunged to hit the man, grabbed his device and smashed it on the ground. He was arrested and charged with strong-armed robbery and criminal mischief. McGregor was released on a $5,000 bond. On 14 March 2019, news surfaced that McGregor was also facing a civil lawsuit from the fan involved in the incident. On 8 April, the civil lawsuit against McGregor was dropped by the fan. On 13 May, it was revealed that the criminal charges against McGregor had also been dropped after the accuser's attorney said that his client had "been made whole" by McGregor, in a reference to an out-of-court settlement that was reached.

=== Mixed martial arts event incidents ===
==== Incident at Bellator 187 ====
On 10 November 2017, McGregor's SBG Ireland teammate Charlie Ward made his debut at Bellator 187 in Dublin against John Redmond. Ward knocked out Redmond in round one, and McGregor jumped the cage (he was not a licensed cornerman) to celebrate Ward's win while the fight was not yet officially declared over. McGregor was separated by referee Marc Goddard, as Goddard needed to verify if the knockout was before the bell, and to ensure lock down of the cage for medical staff to assess the health of the knocked out Redmond. McGregor charged towards Goddard: while he pushed and confronted Goddard in a wild melee, he also checked on the downed Redmond and knocked him down while he was trying to get up.

McGregor did a lap around the cage after he exited the cage a few minutes later, then climbed and straddled the cage apron to continue the celebration of Ward's win. He was stopped by a commissioner and McGregor, agitated, slapped the commissioner's face. Redmond stated after the fight that Goddard intended to let the fight continue to round two, but the Mohegan Sun commission, which oversaw the event, elected to end the fight due to McGregor's behaviour in the ring.

A day after the incident, the head of the commission for Bellator 187, Mike Mazzulli, the president of both the Mohegan Tribe Department of Athletic Regulation (MTDAR) and Association of Boxing Commissions, issued a statement, stating that "McGregor's conduct jeopardized the health and safety" of fighters who were in the cage during the Ireland event. In addition, McGregor "assaulted Referee Mark Goddard and a [member of] Bellator staff".

==== Bus attack at UFC 223 Media Day ====
On 3 April 2018, Khabib Nurmagomedov and his entourage cornered and slapped Artem Lobov at a hotel in Brooklyn, New York. Lobov is known to be close to McGregor, with whom Nurmagomedov has had altercations and trash talk exchanges. On 5 April 2018, during promotional appearances for UFC 223, McGregor and a group of about twenty others were let into the Barclays Center by credentialled members of his promotional team. They attempted to confront Nurmagomedov, who was on a bus leaving the arena with "red corner" fighters for UFC 223 on it, such as Rose Namajunas, Al Iaquinta, Karolina Kowalkiewicz, Ray Borg and Michael Chiesa. McGregor ran up alongside the slowly moving bus and then ran past it to grab a metal equipment dolly, which he then threw at the bus's window, before trying to throw other objects in the vicinity. Chiesa and Borg were injured by the shattered glass and sent to hospital. They were soon removed from the card on the advice of the NYSAC and the UFC's medical team. Lobov was also pulled from his fight for his involvement in the dispute.

Dana White said there was a warrant out for McGregor's arrest and the NYPD said McGregor was a person of interest. White said McGregor had told him via text message: "This had to be done." "You can imagine he's going to be sued beyond belief", White said, and denied suggestions that the violence was a publicity stunt intended to generate interest in the UFC. McGregor and others involved initially fled the Barclays Center after the incident, although he and a fellow accused turned themselves in that night. McGregor was charged with three counts of assault and one count of criminal mischief. He was further charged with menacing and reckless endangerment at his arraignment and was released on $50,000 bail until 14 June 2018. Under the bail conditions negotiated by his then attorney, Jim Walden, and set by the judge, McGregor was allowed to travel without restriction. On 12 April 2018, McGregor hired lawyer Bruce Mafeo of Cozen O'Connor to represent him in this matter. McGregor pleaded no contest to a count of disorderly conduct and was ordered to perform five days of community service and attend anger management classes. On 12 September 2018, Chiesa announced a lawsuit against McGregor, saying that he "experienced pain, suffering and a loss of enjoyment of life" as a result of the attack.

==== Incident at UFC 229 ====
Following the fight at UFC 229 on 6 October 2018, Khabib Nurmagomedov jumped out of the cage and charged towards McGregor's training partner Dillon Danis. Soon afterwards, McGregor and Abubakar Nurmagomedov, Khabib's cousin, also attempted to exit the octagon, but a scuffle broke out after McGregor punched Abubakar, who then punched him back. Two of Nurmagomedov's cornermen retaliated: Esed Emiragaev and Zubaira Tukhugov. Tukhugov was scheduled to fight on 27 October 2018 at UFC Fight Night: Volkan vs. Smith against Artem Lobov, the McGregor team member who was confronted by Nurmagomedov in April 2018. Nurmagomedov's payment for the fight was withheld by the Nevada State Athletic Commission (NSAC) as a result, pending an investigation into his actions. Nurmagomedov appeared at the post-fight interview and apologised to the NSAC.

The NSAC filed a formal complaint against both McGregor and Nurmagomedov, and on 24 October, the NSAC voted to release half of Nurmagomedov's $2 million fight payout immediately. Nurmagomedov and McGregor received indefinite bans, at least until the official hearing, which took place in December 2018. On 29 January 2019, the NSAC announced a six-month suspension for McGregor (retroactive to 6 October 2018) and a $50,000 fine. He became eligible to compete again on 6 April 2019.

=== Assault incidents ===
==== Dublin pub assault ====
On 15 August 2019, TMZ Sports published a video that showed McGregor punching an older man at The Marble Arch Pub in Dublin. The incident happened on 6 April and was originally reported by Irish media, although without the video that showed the attack. McGregor had repeatedly offered the victim a shot of his whiskey, which the victim repeatedly declined, then McGregor had punched him. Gardaí stated that they had opened an investigation. McGregor was charged with assault and first appeared in court on 11 October 2019. The court heard that McGregor had 18 prior convictions from 2018 going back to 2009. The majority were for driving offences, but he was given the Probation Act in 2009 when he was an apprentice plumber for an assault causing harm offence. On 1 November, McGregor pleaded guilty to the assault and was fined €1,000.

==== Attack on Francesco Facchinetti ====
On 17 October 2021, McGregor allegedly assaulted Francesco Facchinetti, an Italian musician and TV presenter, in a nightclub in Rome, breaking Facchinetti's nose in front of witnesses and bodyguards. A few days later, Facchinetti filed charges against McGregor for the attack.

==== Alleged attack on yacht ====
In January 2023, McGregor was accused of assaulting a 42-year-old woman aboard his yacht in Ibiza, Spain, during his birthday party on 22 July 2022. The woman claimed she was berated by McGregor before being physically assaulted. She further claimed that she was forced to jump from the yacht to escape McGregor and that she sustained a broken arm in the process. The woman did not file a formal statement with Spanish police at the time of the incident. In January, she gave a formal statement with Gardaí, who then shared that statement with their Spanish counterparts. The woman has also filed a civil suit against McGregor over the alleged incident. After making her formal statement, the woman's car was burned outside of her Dublin home, though no link was made to McGregor's alleged attack. In February, a brick was reportedly thrown through a window of that residence. In late February 2023, news surfaced that the lawsuit was discontinued by the plaintiff, with no further information provided.

==== Punching the Miami Heat mascot ====
On 10 June 2023, McGregor appeared at Game Four of the 2023 NBA Finals in Miami, Florida, to promote his pain relief spray in a planned skit with the Miami Heat's mascot, Burnie. McGregor proceeded to punch the man wearing the mascot costume (Heat dancer Chris Brown) once and "knock him out", but then he dealt a second, powerful and apparently off-script punch to Brown's jaw while Brown was on the ground. Brown was subsequently treated in a local hospital emergency room and later released. Most of the crowd in attendance booed McGregor for his actions. On 13 June, three days after the incident, McGregor claimed that "it was a skit" and that "all is well" between the two.

=== Rape and sexual assault cases ===
==== Dublin rape case ====
In March 2019, The New York Times reported that McGregor was under investigation by the Garda Síochána, following allegations of a sexual assault on a woman in a Dublin hotel in December 2018. A second allegation of sexual assault was reported in October 2019, regarding an assault on a woman in a car alleged to have taken place earlier that month.

In January 2021, after prosecutors declined to prosecute McGregor for the 2018 alleged sexual assault, a civil claim for damages was launched in the High Court. A spokeswoman for McGregor said in a statement that the allegations against him were "categorically rejected" and that he was "confident that justice will prevail" in the civil case. In March 2022, the High Court made a pre-trial discovery order against McGregor requiring the Gardaí to disclose certain information and documents gathered by them.

The civil action was taken against McGregor by Nikita Hand, who alleged he violently beat and raped her in Dublin in December 2018. The trial began in the High Court in Dublin on 5 November 2024, with Mr. Justice Alexander Owens as judge. On 22 November 2024, the jury returned their verdict and found that McGregor had raped Hand. Accordingly, McGregor was ordered to pay Hand nearly €250,000 in damages. On 5 December 2024, Justice Owens ordered McGregor to pay the entirety of Hand's legal costs, approximately €1,500,000, and said that he may begin contempt of court proceedings against McGregor for his comments about the case on social media after it concluded. During his cross-examination, McGregor admitted to using cocaine.

After the trial, McGregor indicated on social media that he planned to appeal the verdict, and Hand said she hoped that the case would encourage victims of assault to continue "pushing forward for justice". The Irish Minister for Justice, Helen McEntee, praised Hand's bravery and determination, and the Taoiseach, Simon Harris, had a phone conversation with Hand before complimenting her "bravery and courage" when speaking to the media. It also emerged that Hand's partner had been stabbed and windows were smashed when attackers wearing balaclavas invaded their home in June 2024. This information was withheld from the jury during the trial.

In light of the court ruling, IO Interactive ceased its collaboration with McGregor, removing content that featured him from their Hitman video game series. The Rape Crisis Network Ireland also called for retailers to stop selling his stout and whiskey brands. Various retailers and Irish wholesalers, including the Musgrave Group, announced that they would no longer stock his beer brand or whiskey, which would see the brands removed from SuperValu, Centra, Tesco Ireland, Spar, Mace and Londis stores, among others. A few days after the verdict, Proper No. Twelve-parent company Proximo Spirits announced it would no longer feature McGregor in association with the brand. Wetherspoons and other pub chains likewise stopped selling McGregor's stout brand.

At the start of July 2025 McGregor withdrew his application to bring in new witnesses, Samantha O'Reilly and Steven Cummins, and evidence in support of his appeal against the finding that he had raped Hand. The late withdrawal of the witnesses and evidence was described by her legal team as a concession that the evidence was a lie and that the matter should be referred to the Director of Public Prosecutions to consider perjury, which the court agreed to do. On 31 July, McGregor lost his appeal and the original ruling was upheld. Hand's legal team has initiated legal proceedings to seek damages from McGregor, O'Reilly, and Cummins.

Following the failed appeal, McGregor brought a further appeal to the Supreme Court using new lawyers. In December 2025 the judges found that he had had a fair hearing, had used his right of appeal and refused further appeal. Nikita Hand welcomed the decision of the Supreme Court.

In September 2026 Samantha O’Reilly and Steven Cummins were charged with perjury following a Garda investigation into the failed appeal. They appeared before Dublin District Court and charged with giving statements in a judicial proceeding which were false and which they knew to be false. The judge was told that the Director of Public Prosecutions ordered that they both be tried before a jury in the Circuit Criminal Court. They were remanded on bail provided that they sign in weekly at Ballyfermot Garda station, provide a mobile number and do not attempt to interfere with witnesses. They will appear before the District court on 9 November for the book of evidence to be served.

==== Miami Heat arena alleged sexual assault ====
On 11 June 2023, Miami police received a report that McGregor had sexually assaulted a woman the previous night in a toilet at the Miami Heat arena, after Game Four of the NBA Finals. McGregor released a statement denying the allegation. On 18 October, the case was dropped.

On 15 January 2025, a lawsuit was filed against McGregor in the U.S. District Court for the Southern District of Florida, accusing him of sexual assault during an NBA Finals game in Miami on 9 June 2023. The suit alleges that McGregor assaulted a 49-year-old woman in a bathroom at the Kaseya Center, home of the Miami Heat. The plaintiff, identified as a vice president at a prominent Wall Street financial firm, claims that McGregor "intentionally engaged in unlawful sexual contact", "attempted to forcefully place his unprotected penis into [her] mouth without her consent". She attempted to leave the stall, but McGregor allegedly slammed her against a wall face first, put her in an arm lock and "attempted to forcefully place his unprotected penis into [the victim's] anus without her consent." The lawsuit also names the Miami Heat and arena staff as defendants, alleging gross negligence in their handling of the situation. Key details of the lawsuit include an allegation that the woman was led to the men's restroom by a member of McGregor's team, and that arena staff and security were aware of potential misconduct but failed to provide adequate protection. The plaintiff's attorney stated that his client's main goal in filing the lawsuit was to raise awareness and encourage others to report sexual assault. The lawsuit seeks medical treatment costs, compensatory damages, and other relief from both McGregor and the Heat organisation. On 3 December 2025, the civil lawsuit was voluntarily dismissed with prejudice by the plaintiff, meaning the litigation cannot be refiled.

==== Unsolicited nude photos incident ====
In July 2025, rapper Azealia Banks, writing on X, accused McGregor of sending her unsolicited dick pics. However, in later posts Banks stated she and McGregor had in fact been exchanging unsolicited nude pictures as far back as 2016.

== Political views ==
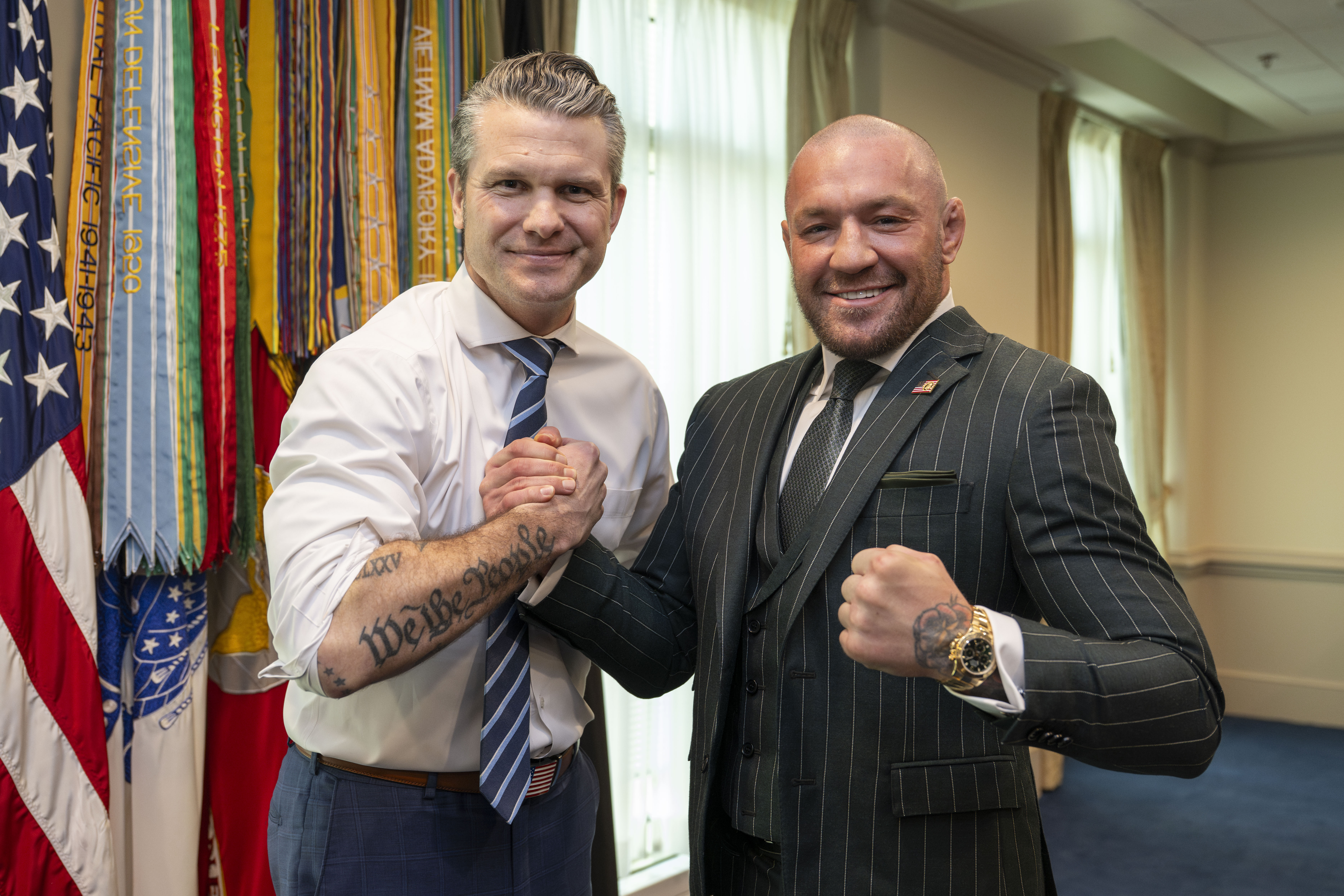
McGregor with U.S. Secretary of Defense Pete Hegseth at The Pentagon, March 2025

McGregor's political views have been categorised as far-right, and as populist. Opposition to immigration is his most frequent political topic.

=== Response to the 2023 Dublin riots ===
On 23 November 2023, in response to the stabbing of a woman and three children in Dublin, McGregor made multiple anti-immigration statements, tweeting that "Ireland is at war". In response to a tweet by Britain First leader Paul Golding calling on McGregor to lead a "freedom march", McGregor condemned the riots that followed the stabbings but tweeted "Ashling Murphy murdered. Two Sligo men decapitated. This is NOT Ireland's future! If they do not act soon with their plan of action to ensure Ireland's safety, I will." He also called for the man who perpetrated the stabbings to be "tortured and killed". It was reported on 28 November that McGregor was being investigated as part of a criminal probe into incitement to hatred, following his social media statements following the stabbings. The Twitter posts were subsequently deleted and in March 2025 it was announced that McGregor would not be charged for incitement.

=== Views on the Gaza war ===
McGregor has shown support for Israel in the Israeli–Palestinian conflict. On 26 November 2023, McGregor criticised then Taoiseach Leo Varadkar for his views on immigration and for his failure to mention the Palestinian militant group Hamas when he wrote about an Irish hostage released by the group, in which he described her as "an innocent child who was lost."

=== 2025 Irish presidential run and White House visit ===
It was reported in December 2023 that McGregor was considering running for the office of President of Ireland, to which Elon Musk posted on X "Not a bad idea." A poll that month found that eight percent of people polled would vote for McGregor for office, while 89 percent said they would not.

On 17 March 2025, McGregor visited the White House in Washington, D.C. at the invitation of U.S. President Donald Trump, for a Saint Patrick's Day event. During the visit, McGregor said that Ireland was losing its Irishness and blamed illegal immigration. His comments were condemned by Taoiseach Micheál Martin, who stated that they were both wrong and did not reflect the spirit of Saint Patrick's Day or the values of the Irish people. The Tánaiste and Minister for Foreign Affairs, Simon Harris, echoed Martin's remarks. The leader of the Social Democratic and Labour Party (SDLP), Colum Eastwood, noted that McGregor had never been elected and did not represent the Irish people. Matthew O'Toole of the SDLP felt that the meeting was insulting to Irish people and that McGregor was an "appalling individual". During the visit, McGregor announced his intention to stand as an independent candidate in the 2025 Irish presidential election.

The chief executive of the Dublin Rape Crisis Centre, Rachel Morrogh, said the meeting between McGregor and Trump was shocking since a jury had recently found that McGregor had committed rape. Human rights lawyer and former head of the Rape Crisis Centre, Noeline Blackwell, said "The other thing that occurred to me, though, was the enormous sense of entitlement that Mr McGregor seems to feel. I was thinking of Nikita Hand with judgment of her peers in the jury that Mr McGregor was civilly liable for the sexual assault on her, and just thinking that that's the reality for an awful lot of people who are victims of sexual abuse – that even after a court judgment, even after hearing the level of hurt and harm that Nikita Hand suffered, that she and others like her have to, in some ways, put up with the reality that in the community sometimes the message just isn't getting through to those who are actually found by court of law to be liable along the way." Ruth Coppinger said in Dáil Éireann, that it was a meeting of two rapists.

In an April poll by the Sunday Independent, 7% of those polled said they would vote for McGregor in a presidential election, while 90% said they would not. 69% of respondents said they would be less likely to vote for a TD or councillor if they nominated McGregor to run. 78% said Donald Trump disrespected Ireland by inviting McGregor to the White House.

On 4 August 2025, McGregor launched an online petition, hoping to generate enough public support to pressure a change in the current electoral rules, which would have required an amendment by referendum to the Constitution of Ireland. His petition was aimed to circumvent the Irish constitution and allow for a direct popular vote on who can appear on the ballot. Under Ireland's constitution, a presidential candidate must be nominated by least 20 members of the Oireachtas, or by four local authorities.

On 15 September 2025, McGregor announced that he was withdrawing from the presidential race.

== Business ventures ==
=== Endorsements and sponsors ===
McGregor has had endorsement deals with Beats by Dre, Monster Energy, Reebok and Bud Light. In 2017, his endorsement deals rounded up to $7 million. In light of a 2024 Dublin court case, in which McGregor was found to have assaulted and raped a woman in December 2018, McGregor lost his first sponsor when the IO Interactive video game company ceased its collaboration with him. After the court case, Rape Crisis Network Ireland called for retailers to stop selling his stout and whiskey brands. Musgrave delisted McGregor-linked drinks, resulting in SuperValu, Costcutter, Centra and Carry Out ceasing to sell McGregor's Forged Irish Stout and Proper No. Twelve whiskey. Tesco and Ocado additionally pulled all alcoholic products associated with McGregor from their stores, alongside Wetherspoons, Asda, and BWG Group who stopped stocking Proper No. Twelve whiskey. Irish airports in Cork and Dublin also pulled McGregor-related alcohol products from their airport bars.

=== Clothing ===
Just ahead of his fight with Mayweather, McGregor announced a fashion partnership with tailoring brand David August; the brand is named "August McGregor" and is aimed at providing modern men's suits to millennials. August had met McGregor about three years earlier, via Dana White.

=== Alcohol and pub ===
In September 2018, McGregor launched Proper No. Twelve Irish whiskey in Ireland and the United States. The whiskey is named after the Crumlin neighbourhood in Dublin 12, in which McGregor grew up. In 2021, it was reported that McGregor and his business partners sold their majority stake in the Proper No. Twelve company to Proximo Spirits, who previously had a 49% stake, for a deal worth a reported $600 million. In the aftermath of a 2024 Dublin court case, in which McGregor was found to have assaulted and raped a woman in December 2018, Proximo Spirits announced it would no longer use McGregor's name or image on the drink.

In an August 2022 interview Artem Lobov alleged that McGregor was initially headed towards creating a vodka product, but it was Lobov who pitched the idea of doing a whiskey instead. In the same interview, Lobov also stated that he was the one who did the background study and conducted business deals for the product. In late November 2022, news surfaced that Lobov had sued McGregor, seeking five percent of the proceeds of the $600 million deal conducted in 2021. Following the suing, McGregor aimed several social media messages at Lobov, who subsequently filed another lawsuit against McGregor for defamation, intimidation and harassment. In January 2023, the latter lawsuit was denied by the judge and Lobov was ordered to pay the legal fees.

In 2020, McGregor purchased a pub in Crumlin, renaming it to the Black Forge Inn. In 2022, the Black Forge Inn was targeted by petrol bombs. He purchased a second pub in 2021, the Marble Arch. McGregor had previously assaulted a man at the Marble Arch on 6 April 2019.

McGregor officially launched Forged Irish Stout in 2021. In 2024, complaints about the sexualised nature of its advertising were upheld by the Advertising Standards Authority for Ireland.

On 25 July 2025 at 3am a fire broke out at the Black Forge Inn, but the blaze was extinguished and there were no casualties. The fire is being treated as suspicious, though Gardaí do not believe a petrol bomb was involved. The following month, a man in his twenties was arrested by Gardaí attached to the Special Detective Unit and held in a Garda station in Dublin.

=== Entertainment and sports ===
In 2022, McGregor was cast along with the actor Jake Gyllenhaal in a remake of the 1989 film Road House.

On 27 April 2024, it was announced that McGregor and his company "McGregor Sports and Entertainment" were now part-owners of Bare Knuckle Fighting Championship (BKFC). McGregor has since appeared at multiple BKFC events.

== Personal life ==
McGregor has two sisters named Erin and Aoife. He is Catholic. His cousins Keith Buckley and Warren Davis are both professional footballers.

He has been in a relationship with Dee Devlin since 2008, and they have four children. They got engaged in 2020, and married at the Church of Santo Stefano degli Abissini in Vatican City in December 2025.

McGregor often trains at the Mjölnir gym in Reykjavík, alongside fellow UFC fighter Gunnar Nelson. He has stated that he does not adhere to any pre-fight rituals or superstitions because he believes them to be "a form of fear". McGregor is a football fan and a supporter of both Celtic and Manchester United. He has also expressed support for Paris Saint-Germain, being a friend of Sergio Ramos.

== Championships and accomplishments ==
=== Mixed martial arts ===
- Ultimate Fighting Championship
  - UFC Lightweight Championship (One time)
  - UFC Featherweight Championship (One time)
  - Interim UFC Featherweight Championship (One time)
  - Fight of the Night (Two times) vs. Nate Diaz (x2)
  - Knockout of the Night (One time) vs. Marcus Brimage
    - Greatest Knockout in UFC's first 25 Years vs. José Aldo
  - Performance of the Night (Seven times) vs. Diego Brandão, Dustin Poirier, Dennis Siver, Chad Mendes, José Aldo, Eddie Alvarez and Donald Cerrone
    - Tied (Donald Cerrone, Ovince Saint Preux, Tom Aspinall, Carlos Prates & Song Yadong) for fourth most Performance of the Night awards in UFC history (7)
    - Most consecutive Performance of the Night awards in UFC history (5)
    - Most consecutive post-fight bonuses in UFC history (8)
  - First Irish-born UFC champion
  - Third Multi-Divisional Champion in UFC History (Featherweight, Lightweight)
  - First simultaneous multi-divisional champion in UFC history (Featherweight, Lightweight)
  - Fastest win in a UFC Championship fight (13 seconds) vs. José Aldo
  - Fastest finish in a UFC Championship fight (13 seconds) vs. José Aldo
  - Most knockdowns-per-fifteen minutes in UFC Featherweight division history (2.31)
  - Tied (Chad Mendes & Choi Doo-ho) for third most knockouts in UFC Featherweight division history (6)
  - One of five fighters (Jared Cannonier, Vitor Belfort, Robert Whittaker & Max Holloway) to have knockout victories in three different weight classes
  - Tied for fourth most consecutive knockouts in UFC history (5)
  - Holds wins over four former UFC champions (3 undisputed) — vs. Max Holloway 1, José Aldo, Eddie Alvarez and Dustin Poirier (interim)
  - UFC.com Awards
    - 2013: Ranked #2 Newcomer of the Year
    - 2015: Fighter of the Year & Ranked #2 Knockout of the Year vs. José Aldo
    - 2016: Ranked #3 Fighter of the Year & Ranked #2 Fight of the Year vs. Nate Diaz 2
- Cage Warriors Fighting Championship
  - CWFC Featherweight Championship (One time)
  - CWFC Lightweight Championship (One time)
- BJPenn.com
  - 2010s Fighter of the Decade
- Black Belt magazine
  - 2017 MMA Fighter of the Year
- Bleacher Report
  - 2015 Fighter of the Year
  - 2016 Fighter of the Year
  - 2016 Fight of the Year vs. Nate Diaz at UFC 202
  - 2017 Story of the Year: Conor Goes Boxing
  - 2018 Story of the Year: Conor McGregor Attacks a Bus and Its Occupants
- ESPN
  - 2015 Fighter of the Year
- ESPYs
  - 2016 Best Fighter
- Sports Illustrated
  - 2016 Fighter of the Year
- Fight Matrix
  - 2015 Male Fighter of the Year
  - 2020 Comeback Fighter of the Year
  - Lineal Featherweight Championship (one time)
- Fox Sports
  - 2015 Fighter of the Year
  - 2016 Fight of the Year vs. Nate Diaz at UFC 202
- MMA Fighting
  - 2015 Event of the Year headlined at UFC 189
  - 2015 Fighter of the Year
  - 2010s #5 Ranked Fighter of the Decade
- MMA Junkie
  - 2015 Male Fighter of the Year
  - 2015 #2 Ranked Knockout of the Year vs. José Aldo at UFC 194
  - 2015 December Knockout of the Month vs. José Aldo
  - 2016 #2 Ranked Fighter of the Year
  - 2016 #3 Ranked Fight of the Year vs. Nate Diaz 2 at UFC 202
  - 2016 #5 Ranked Fight of the Year vs. Nate Diaz at UFC 196
  - 2016 March Fight of the Month vs. Nate Diaz
  - 2016 August Fight of the Month vs. Nate Diaz
  - 2010s #5 Ranked Fighter of the Decade
- MMA Insider
  - 2013 Best UFC Newcomer
- MMA Mania
  - 2015 Event of the Year headlined at UFC 189
  - 2015 Fighter of the Year
- RTÉ Sport
  - 2016 RTÉ Sports Person of the Year
- Rolling Stone
  - 25 Hottest Sex Symbols of 2015 inclusion
- Severe MMA
  - 2014 Irish Pro Fighter of the Year
  - 2015 Irish Pro Fighter of the Year
  - 2015 Fighter of the Year
- Sherdog
  - 2014 Breakthrough Fighter of the Year
  - 2015 Event of the Year headlined at UFC 194
  - 2015 Knockout of the Year vs. José Aldo
  - 2015 Fighter of the Year
  - 2016 Fighter of the Year
- The MMA Community
  - 2015 Male Fighter of the Year
- Time
  - 2017 Top 100 Most Influential People inclusion
- VIP Style Awards
  - 2014 Ireland's Most Stylish Man
- World MMA Awards
  - 2014 International Fighter of the Year
  - 2015 International Fighter of the Year
  - 2015 Fighter of the Year
  - 2016 Fighter of the Year
- Wrestling Observer Newsletter
  - 2016, 2017, 2018, 2020 and 2021 Best Box Office Draw
  - 2015, 2016 and 2017 Best on Interviews
  - 2015 Feud of the Year vs. José Aldo
  - 2016 Feud of the Year vs. Nate Diaz
  - 2016 and 2018 Mixed Martial Arts Most Valuable
  - 2016 Most Charismatic
  - 2015 and 2016 Most Outstanding Fighter of the Year
- Yahoo Sports
  - 2015 Fighter of the Year
  - 2016 Fight of the Year vs. Nate Diaz 2 at UFC 202
- CBS Sports
  - 2016 #3 Ranked UFC Fighter of the Year
  - 2016 #2 Ranked UFC Fight of the Year vs. Nate Diaz at UFC 202
  - 2016 #6 Ranked UFC Fight of the Year vs. Nate Diaz at UFC 196
- Combat Press
  - 2014 Breakout Fighter of the Year
  - 2015 Fighter of the Year
- MMA Weekly
  - 2015 Fighter of the Year

==== State/Local ====
- Key to the City of Miami: 28 September 2021

== Pay-per-view bouts ==
=== Mixed martial arts ===
No.	Event	Fight	Date	Venue	City	PPV buys
1.	UFC 189	Mendes vs. McGregor	11 July 2015	MGM Grand Garden Arena	Las Vegas, Nevada, US	825,000
2.	UFC 194	Aldo vs. McGregor	12 December 2015	MGM Grand Garden Arena	Las Vegas, Nevada, US	1,200,000
3.	UFC 196	McGregor vs. Diaz	5 March 2016	MGM Grand Garden Arena	Las Vegas, Nevada, US	1,317,000
4.	UFC 202	Diaz vs. McGregor 2	20 August 2016	T-Mobile Arena	Las Vegas, Nevada, US	1,650,000
5.	UFC 205	Alvarez vs. McGregor	12 November 2016	Madison Square Garden	New York City, New York, US	1,300,000
6.	UFC 229	Khabib vs. McGregor	6 October 2018	T-Mobile Arena	Las Vegas, Nevada, US	2,400,000
7.	UFC 246	McGregor vs. Cowboy	18 January 2020	T-Mobile Arena	Las Vegas, Nevada, US	1,000,000
8.	UFC 257	Poirier vs. McGregor 2	24 January 2021	Etihad Arena	Abu Dhabi, United Arab Emirates	1,600,000
9.	UFC 264	Poirier vs. McGregor 3	10 July 2021	T-Mobile Arena	Las Vegas, Nevada, US	1,800,000
Total sales						13,342,000

=== Boxing ===
United States
No.	Date	Fight	Billing	Network	Buys	Revenue	Source(s)
1	26 August 2017	Mayweather vs. McGregor	The Money Fight	Showtime (US)	4,300,000	$492,785,000	
1	26 August 2017	Mayweather vs. McGregor	The Money Fight	Sky Box Office (UK)	1,007,000	£20,089,650	
Total					5,307,000		

== Filmography ==
=== Film ===
Year	Title	Role	Notes	Ref.
2008	The Escapist	Prisoner	Uncredited	
2017	Conor McGregor: Notorious	Himself	Documentary	
2024	Road House	Knox		

=== Television ===
Year	Title	Role	Notes	Ref.
2023	McGregor Forever	Himself	Documentary	

=== Video games ===
Logan Paul in video games
Year	Title	Role	Notes	Ref.
2014	EA Sports UFC	Himself	Playable Fighter	
2016	EA Sports UFC 2	Himself	Playable Fighter	
2016	Call of Duty: Infinite Warfare	Captain Bradley Fillion	Antagonist	
2018	EA Sports UFC 3	Himself	Playable Fighter	
2020	EA Sports UFC 4	Himself	Playable Fighter	
2023	EA Sports UFC 5	Himself	Playable Fighter	
2024	Hitman: World of Assassination	Himself	"The Disruptor" Elusive Target	

== Mixed martial arts record ==
=== Professional ===
Professional record breakdown
29 matches	22 wins	7 losses
By knockout	19	3
By submission	1	4
By decision	2	0

Res.	Record	Opponent	Method	Event	Date	Round	Time	Location	Notes
Loss	22–7	Max Holloway	TKO (knee injury)	UFC 329	11 July 2026	1	1:09	Las Vegas, Nevada, United States	Return to Welterweight.
Loss	22–6	Dustin Poirier	TKO (doctor stoppage)	UFC 264	10 July 2021	1	5:00	Las Vegas, Nevada, United States	
Loss	22–5	Dustin Poirier	TKO (punches)	UFC 257	24 January 2021	2	2:32	Abu Dhabi, United Arab Emirates	
Win	22–4	Donald Cerrone	TKO (head kick and punches)	UFC 246	18 January 2020	1	0:40	Las Vegas, Nevada, United States	Welterweight bout. Performance of the Night.
Loss	21–4	Khabib Nurmagomedov	Submission (neck crank)	UFC 229	6 October 2018	4	3:03	Las Vegas, Nevada, United States	For the UFC Lightweight Championship.
Win	21–3	Eddie Alvarez	TKO (punches)	UFC 205	12 November 2016	2	3:04	New York City, New York, United States	Won the UFC Lightweight Championship. Performance of the Night. Later stripped of the title due to inactivity.
Win	20–3	Nate Diaz	Decision (majority)	UFC 202	20 August 2016	5	5:00	Las Vegas, Nevada, United States	Fight of the Night.
Loss	19–3	Nate Diaz	Submission (rear-naked choke)	UFC 196	5 March 2016	2	4:12	Las Vegas, Nevada, United States	Welterweight debut. Fight of the Night.
Win	19–2	José Aldo	KO (punch)	UFC 194	12 December 2015	1	0:13	Las Vegas, Nevada, United States	Won and unified the UFC Featherweight Championship. Performance of the Night. Later stripped of the title due to inactivity.
Win	18–2	Chad Mendes	TKO (punches)	UFC 189	11 July 2015	2	4:57	Las Vegas, Nevada, United States	Won the interim UFC Featherweight Championship. Performance of the Night.
Win	17–2	Dennis Siver	TKO (punches)	UFC Fight Night: McGregor vs. Siver	18 January 2015	2	1:54	Boston, Massachusetts, United States	Performance of the Night.
Win	16–2	Dustin Poirier	TKO (punches)	UFC 178	27 September 2014	1	1:46	Las Vegas, Nevada, United States	Performance of the Night.
Win	15–2	Diego Brandão	TKO (punches)	UFC Fight Night: McGregor vs. Brandão	19 July 2014	1	4:05	Dublin, Ireland	Performance of the Night.
Win	14–2	Max Holloway	Decision (unanimous)	UFC Fight Night: Shogun vs. Sonnen	17 August 2013	3	5:00	Boston, Massachusetts, United States	
Win	13–2	Marcus Brimage	TKO (punches)	UFC on Fuel TV: Mousasi vs. Latifi	6 April 2013	1	1:07	Stockholm, Sweden	Return to Featherweight. Knockout of the Night.
Win	12–2	Ivan Buchinger	KO (punch)	Cage Warriors 51	31 December 2012	1	3:40	Dublin, Ireland	Won the vacant Cage Warriors Lightweight Championship.
Win	11–2	Dave Hill	Submission (rear-naked choke)	Cage Warriors 47	2 June 2012	2	4:10	Dublin, Ireland	Won the vacant Cage Warriors Featherweight Championship.
Win	10–2	Steve O'Keefe	KO (elbows)	Cage Warriors 45	18 February 2012	1	1:35	London, England	Return to Featherweight.
Win	9–2	Aaron Jahnsen	TKO (punches)	Cage Warriors: Fight Night 2	8 September 2011	1	3:29	Amman, Jordan	
Win	8–2	Artur Sowiński	TKO (punches)	Celtic Gladiator 2	11 June 2011	2	1:12	Portlaoise, Ireland	Return to Lightweight.
Win	7–2	Paddy Doherty	KO (punch)	Immortal FC 4	16 April 2011	1	0:04	Letterkenny, Ireland	
Win	6–2	Mike Wood	KO (punches)	Cage Contender 8	12 March 2011	1	0:16	Dublin, Ireland	Return to Featherweight.
Win	5–2	Hugh Brady	TKO (punches)	Chaos FC 8	12 February 2011	1	2:31	Derry, Northern Ireland	
Loss	4–2	Joseph Duffy	Submission (arm-triangle choke)	Cage Warriors 39	27 November 2010	1	0:38	Cork, Ireland	
Win	4–1	Connor Dillon	TKO (corner stoppage)	Chaos FC 7	9 October 2010	1	4:22	Derry, Northern Ireland	Featherweight bout.
Win	3–1	Stephen Bailey	TKO (punches)	K.O.: The Fight Before Christmas 1	12 December 2008	1	1:22	Dublin, Ireland	Lightweight debut.
Loss	2–1	Artemij Sitenkov	Submission (kneebar)	Cage of Truth 3	28 June 2008	1	1:09	Dublin, Ireland	
Win	2–0	Mo Taylor	TKO (punches)	Cage Rage Contenders: Ireland vs. Belgium	3 May 2008	1	1:06	Dublin, Ireland	
Win	1–0	Gary Morris	TKO (punches)	Cage of Truth 2	8 March 2008	2	0:08	Dublin, Ireland	Featherweight debut.

=== Amateur ===
Amateur record breakdown		
1 match	1 win	0 losses
By knockout	1	0

Res.	Record	Opponent	Method	Event	Date	Round	Time	Location	Notes
Win	1–0	Ciaran Campbell	TKO (punches)	Ring of Truth 6	17 February 2007	1	1:31	Dublin, Ireland	

== Boxing record ==
=== Professional ===
1 fight	0 wins	1 loss
By knockout	0	1

No.	Result	Record	Opponent	Type	Round, time	Date	Location	Notes
1	Loss	0–1	Floyd Mayweather Jr.	TKO	10 (12), 1:05	26 Aug 2017	T-Mobile Arena, Paradise, Nevada, US	

=== Exhibition ===
1 fight	0 wins	0 losses
Draws	1	

No.	Result	Record	Opponent	Type	Round, time	Date	Location	Notes
1	Draw	0–0–1	Michael McGrane	PTS	4	19 Apr 2019	Crumlin Boxing Club, Dublin, Ireland	

== See also ==
- Double champions in MMA
- List of Irish UFC fighters
- List of male mixed martial artists
- List of mixed martial artists with professional boxing records
- List of UFC champions

Achievements
Vacant Title last held by Danny Batten	4th Cage Warriors Featherweight Champion; 2 June 2012 – 7 February 2013; Vacated	Vacant Title next held by Jim Alers
Vacant Title last held by Ivan Musardo	6th Cage Warriors Lightweight Champion; 31 December 2012 – 7 February 2013; Vacated	Vacant Title next held by Stevie Ray
New title	1st UFC Interim Featherweight Champion; 11 July – 12 December 2015	Vacant Title next held by José Aldo
Preceded by José Aldo	2nd UFC Featherweight Champion; 12 December 2015 – 26 November 2016; Stripped	Succeeded by José Aldo; Interim champ promoted
Preceded by Eddie Alvarez	9th UFC Lightweight Champion; 12 November 2016 – 7 April 2018; Stripped	Vacant Title next held by Khabib Nurmagomedov
Awards
Preceded by Robbie Lawler	World MMA Fighter of the Year; 2015, 2016	Succeeded by Max Holloway
Preceded by Ronda Rousey	Best Fighter ESPY Award; 2016	Succeeded by Demetrious Johnson
