= Shoyoroll =

American clothing brand

- Company type: Corporation
- Founded: 2006; 20 years ago
- Founder: Vince “Bear” Quitugua
- Headquarters: Los Alamitos, California, United States
- Area served: Worldwide
- Products: Clothing, Brazilian jiu-jitsu gi
- Website: www.shoyoroll.com

Shoyoroll is an American jiu-jitsu lifestyle brand that designs and manufactures Brazilian jiu-jitsu gi, casual apparel, and accessories headquartered in Los Alamitos, California. It is one of the most popular jiu-jitsu brands in the world.

== History ==
Shoyoroll was founded by Vince “Bear” Quitugua in 2006. Bear started making t-shirts and caps to show off his creative side inside his garage in Guam. Budo Videos, a martial arts online retailer, started to exclusively sell Shoyoroll gis in North America in 2009.

Shoyoroll announced a collaboration with the IBJJF for an exclusive line of gis in 2023. In 2023, Shoyoroll won 'Brand of the Year' at the JitsMagazine BJJ Awards.

== Partnerships ==
Shoyoroll have made collaborations with other brands and companies such as Illest, EA Sports, Undefeated, Albino and Preto and RVCA. They have also collaborated with ONE Championship to produce the official kit for their submission grappling division.

== See also ==
- Mixed martial arts clothing
