= Matt Thornton (martial artist) =

American martial arts coach (born 1969)

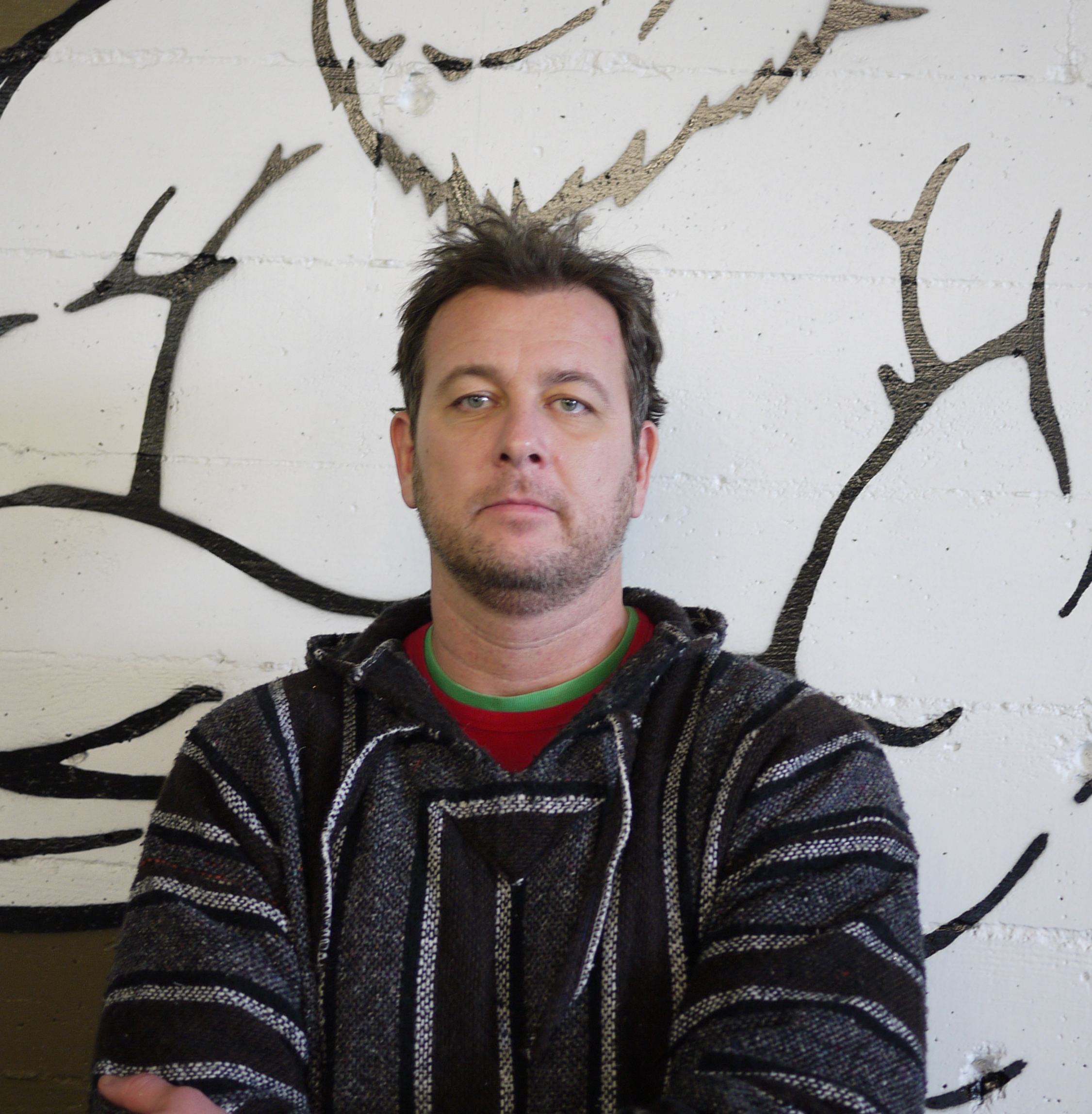
- Team: Straight Blast Gym
- Rank: 6th Degree Black Belt in Brazilian Jiu-Jitsu under Chris Haueter

Other information
- Occupation: Martial arts coach

Matt Thornton (born March 25, 1969) is an American martial arts athlete, trainer, and founder of Straight Blast Gym International, an association based in Portland, Oregon.

== Early years ==
After growing up in the San Francisco bay area of California, Matt joined the U.S. Army where he began his involvement with martial arts as a boxer. In 1988 after leaving the military he returned to the USA and began training in Jeet Kune Do (JKD).

It was in this period that he first began to question aspects of traditional martial arts training methods, and began to formulate his concepts. In 1991 he attended a training session with renowned Brazilian Jiu Jitsu competitor Rickson Gracie. He has recounted this as a breakthrough experience: "I watched Rickson wrestle a room of Judo black belts. He tapped them all out within seconds, without using his hands, and I knew this is for me!"

This began an intensive immersion in BJJ, which included training under Rickson, from whom he received his blue belt in 1992, and later training under Chris Haueter, who subsequently awarded him purple, brown and black belts in BJJ.

== Straight Blast Gym ==
Matt founded the first Straight Blast Gym in Salem, Oregon in 1992, in an effort to create a gym that allowed athletes to train with aliveness. This was the key organizing concept that Thornton created to tie together the various innovations that he had been developing. It included the elimination of the focus on static forms, known in Japanese martial arts as kata, that typified most martial arts training in the United States and much of the world at that time. In 1994 a larger gym in Portland, Oregon was opened, and remains the headquarters for the Straight Blast Gym international association.

Thornton's emphasis on training against resisting opponents, cross training in several martial arts, and inclusion of boxing and wrestling as part of the training were unique for martial arts schools at the time, most of which were focused on Asian fighting systems which emphasized forms and repetitive drills as the methods to gain skills.

The timing of the beginnings of the Straight Blast Gym coincided with the first widely popularized mixed martial arts competitions, the Ultimate Fighting Championship (UFC), which had its first televised match, UFC 1, in November 1993. The domination of the Brazilian Jiu Jitsu fighter Royce Gracie simultaneously raised interest in Jiu Jitsu and created the first wave of athletes looking to train effectively for this type of competition. Thornton's training methods seemed better suited to the intense competition of this new MMA arena than highly constrained rules used in martial arts such as Tae Kwon Do, or those which had little or no full force sparring, such as most forms of Kung Fu being practiced at the time.

As a result Thornton was able to attract a few dedicated mixed martial arts competitors, including Randy Couture to the gym, and this led to synergistic improvements in the training methods used. Couture went on to become a six-time UFC champion and won the UFC 13 tournament. Now retired, he continues to reference his training under Thornton at Straight Blast Gym as helpful in his growth as a fighter. Other notable MMA fighters trained by SBG include John Kavanagh*, former UFC Light Heavyweight Champion Forrest Griffin, and Rory Singer, a professional fighter and contestant on the popular reality TV show "The Ultimate Fighter".

SBG is also well known for questioning many other traditions in martial arts training, including the use of Japanese, Chinese and Korean terminology (in English speaking countries), the use of Asian honorifics for teachers, such as Sifu, and the tradition of progression through the ranks via formalized testing. Many norms associated with the Western style of teaching, such as addressing teachers as "coach" were substituted.

Recently Thornton has been applying many of his ideas to the discipline of philosophy, where he champions skepticism, rationality, and the scientific method and opposes faith based belief systems and mysticism. He has guest lectured in philosophy classes on these topics at Portland State University and other venues. When not travelling to his various affiliates internationally, Thornton coaches at his Portland, Oregon academy. In 2019 Matt released his "Mastering the Mount" Instructional. His first new instructional in 15 years.

== SBG International Association ==
As Thornton's renown grew he became a well-known figure in the martial arts world and was frequently featured in martial arts magazines championing 'aliveness'. and other concepts of his training methods. His training expanded from his own gym in Oregon into over 400 training seminars at martial arts training facilities worldwide. Beginning in 1998 Matt's seminars were made available as commercial video tapes, which further spread his ideas and reputation in the martial arts community.

The popularity of his methods and philosophy led to the formation of several affiliated gyms beginning in the late 1990s. In 2001 this was formalized as the Straight Blast Gym International Brazilian Jiu Jitsu Association. As of 2012 the Straight Blast Gym international organization includes over 35 gyms worldwide including locations in Australia (Leichhardt, NSW and Albany, WA), Canada, Ireland, Iceland, South Africa, South Korea, Sweden, and the UK. Thornton himself owns 2 gyms in Portland, Oregon, and Vancouver, Washington. SBG is affiliated as a registered academy through the IBJJF and USBJJF.

== Instructor lineage ==
Kanō Jigorō → Tomita Tsunejirō → Mitsuyo "Count Koma" Maeda → Hélio Gracie → Rolls Gracie & Carlos "Carlinhos" Gracie Jr → Rigan Machado → Chris Haueter → Matt Thornton
