= Yakovlev (surname) =

Yakovlev (Яковлев, [ˈjakəvlʲɪf]) is an East Slavic surname derived from the masculine given name Yakov. Yakovleva is the feminine form.

Notable people with the surname include:

- Alexander Yakovlev (disambiguation), several people
- Anatoli Yakovlev (1913–1993), Soviet spymaster in New York City
- Andrei Yakovlev (born 1995), Russian footballer
- Boris Yakovlev (1945–2014), Soviet Ukrainian race walker
- Dmitry Yakovlev, Kazakhstani beach volleyball player
- Egor Yakovlev (born 1991), Russian ice hockey player
- Elena Yakovleva (born 1961), Russian actress
- Gennady Yakovlev (born 1938), Russian botanist
- Ivan Yakovlev (1848–1930), Chuvash enlightener, educator, and writer
- Lora Yakovleva (born 1932), Russian chess grandmaster
- Maksim Sergeyevich Yakovlev (born 1991), Russian footballer
- Mikhail Iakovlev (born 2000), Israeli racing cyclist
- Mikhail Yakovlev (footballer, born 1892) (1892–1942), Russian footballer
- Natalya Yakovleva (handballer) (born 1986), Kazakhstani handball player
- Nataliya Yakovleva (swimmer) (born 1971), Russian Olympic Swimmer
- Nikolai Dmitriyevich Yakovlev (1898–1972), Soviet military leader
- Oleg Yakovlev (footballer, born 1970), Russian football player and manager
- Oleg Yakovlev (footballer, born 1997), Russian footballer
- Olga Vitalevna Yakovleva (1970–2015), Russian singer known as Origa
- Pavel Yakovlev (disambiguation), several people
- Postnik Yakovlev, Russian architect of St Basil's Cathedral in Moscow, active 1555–1588
- Roman Yakovlev (born 1976), Russian volleyball player
- Sergei Yakovlev (disambiguation), several people
- Vadim Yakovlev, Russian Cossack cavalry commander, active 1914–1923
- Valentina Yakovleva (born 1947), Soviet Olympic Swimmer
- Varvara Yakovleva (died 1918), Russian Orthodox nun and saint
- Varvara Yakovleva (politician) (1884–1941), Russian Bolshevik leader
- Vasily Yakovlev (1885–1938), Finnish Bolshevik revolutionary and politician
- Vasily Evgrafovich Yakovlev (1839–1908), Russian entomologist
- Vasyl Yakovlev (born 1972), Ukrainian Olympic cyclist
- Vitali Yakovlev (born 1985), Russian footballer
- Vladimir Anatolyevich Yakovlev (born 1944), Russian politician
- Vladimir Yakovlev (general) (born 1954), Russian military commander
- Vladimir Yakovlev (journalist) (born 1959), Russian journalist and editor
- Vladislav Yakovlev (rower) (born 1993), Kazakhstani rower
- Yakov Yakovlev (1896–1938), Soviet statesman and politician
- Yegor Yakovlev (1930–2005), Russian journalist
- Yuriy Yakovlev (disambiguation), several people

== See also ==
- Dima Yakovlev Law, Russian law defining sanctions against certain US citizens
- Yakovlev (disambiguation)
