= Alexander Yakovlev (disambiguation) =

Alexander Yakovlev may refer to:

- Alexander Yakovlev (entomologist) (1863–1909), Russian entomologist and painter
- Alexander Stepanovich Yakovlev (1886–1953), Russian and Soviet writer
- Alexander Yevgenievich Yakovlev (1887–1938), Russian neoclassicist painter
- Alexander Yakovlev (engineer) (1906–1989), Soviet aeronautical engineer
- Alexander Yakovlev (Russian politician) (1923–2005), Soviet and Russian politician
- Aleksandr Yakovlev (jurist) (1927–2011), Soviet and Russian jurist, the Presidential Plenipotentiary to the Federal Assembly in 1994–1996
- Alex Yakovlev (scientist) (1956–), Russian-British computer scientist, Professor at Newcastle University, UK
- Alexander Yakovlev (diplomat), United Nations officer convicted of financial crimes in 2010
- Aleksandr Yakovlev (actor), an actor who starred in Me Ivan, You Abraham (1993)
- Alexander Yakovlev (fighter) (born 1984), Russian amateur wrestler, mixed martial artist and rapper
