= UFC 208 =

UFC mixed martial arts event in 2017

UFC 208: Holm vs. de Randamie
- The poster for UFC 208: Holm vs. de Randamie
- Promotion: Ultimate Fighting Championship
- Date: February 11, 2017
- Venue: Barclays Center
- City: Brooklyn, New York
- Attendance: 15,628
- Total gate: $2,275,105

Event chronology
| UFC Fight Night: Bermudez vs. The Korean Zombie | UFC 208: Holm vs. de Randamie | UFC Fight Night: Lewis vs. Browne |

UFC 208: Holm vs. de Randamie was a mixed martial arts event produced by the Ultimate Fighting Championship held on February 11, 2017, at the Barclays Center in Brooklyn, New York.

== Background ==
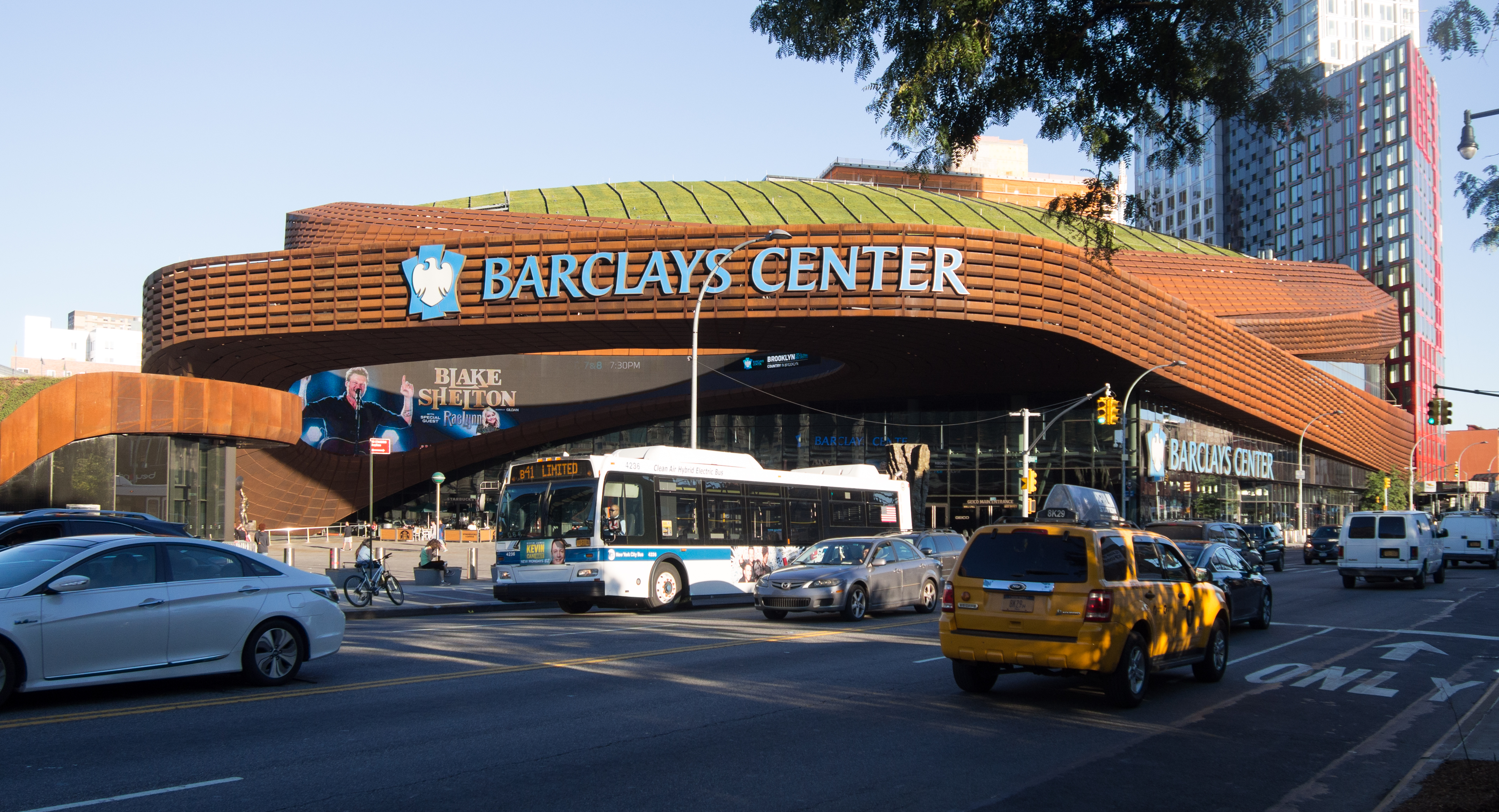
Barclays Center hosts games for teams like the Brooklyn Nets and New York Islanders.

The event was originally scheduled to take place on January 21 at Honda Center in Anaheim, California. However, due to a lack of suitable headliners for the date, the event in Anaheim was postponed to August 5 (and subsequently took place at Staples Center in Los Angeles) and an originally scheduled UFC 209 to be held at the Barclays Center in Brooklyn, New York on February 11 was renamed as UFC 208. This was the first UFC event held in Brooklyn and the fourth overall hosted in the state of New York.

The event was headlined by the inaugural UFC Women's Featherweight Championship bout between former UFC Women's Bantamweight Champion Holly Holm and Germaine de Randamie. It was also the first women's featherweight bout in the promotion's history.

A UFC Featherweight Championship unification bout between two-time champion José Aldo and interim champion Max Holloway was in the works for this card. The bout eventually did not materialize as Holloway had some consideration (nagging injuries and the desire to spend Christmas with his family) about fighting only two months after UFC 206.

The original Anaheim event had two announced bouts, including flyweights Wilson Reis and Ulka Sasaki, as well as a light heavyweight bout between former UFC Light Heavyweight Championship challenger Glover Teixeira and Jimi Manuwa. Teixeira faced Jared Cannonier at the event, while Manuwa faced Corey Anderson at UFC Fight Night 107.

A flyweight bout between Ian McCall and Neil Seery was originally scheduled for UFC Fight Night: Mousasi vs. Hall 2. However, the pairing was cancelled on the day of the weigh-ins, as McCall had to pull out of the fight after becoming ill due to the effects of his weight cut. The fight was later rescheduled for this event. In turn, Seery pulled out on January 29 due to the passing of his mother-in-law. He was replaced by promotional newcomer Jarred Brooks. On the day of the event, McCall was hospitalized with gastrointestinal issues and the bout was cancelled.

Gilbert Burns was expected to face Paul Felder at the event. However, Burns pulled out of the fight in mid-January citing injury. In turn, Felder was removed from the card and rescheduled against a new opponent at a separate event a week later.

A heavyweight contest between Derrick Lewis and Travis Browne was scheduled to take place at this event, but was moved a week later to headline UFC Fight Night 105.

George Sullivan was scheduled to face Randy Brown at the event. However, on January 26, Sullivan was pulled from the card after being notified by USADA of a potential anti-doping violation stemming from an out-of-competition sample collected earlier this year. Belal Muhammad was chosen as his replacement.

Luis Henrique was expected to face Marcin Tybura, but was pulled from the bout on February 1 due to NYSAC concerns related to a corrective eye surgery he underwent almost a year before. He was replaced by promotional newcomer Justin Willis. In turn, the bout was cancelled entirely as Willis was deemed "medically unfit" to compete.

== Results ==
Main Card
| Weight class | | | | Method | Round | Time | Notes |
|---|---|---|---|---|---|---|---|
| Women's Featherweight | Germaine de Randamie | def. | Holly Holm | Decision (unanimous) (48–47, 48–47, 48–47) | 5 | 5:00 | (Note: For the inaugural UFC Women's Featherweight Championship.) |
| Middleweight | Anderson Silva | def. | Derek Brunson | Decision (unanimous) (29–28, 29–28, 30–27) | 3 | 5:00 |
| Middleweight | Ronaldo Souza | def. | Tim Boetsch | Submission (kimura) | 1 | 3:41 |
| Light Heavyweight | Glover Teixeira | def. | Jared Cannonier | Decision (unanimous) (30–26, 30–26, 30–26) | 3 | 5:00 |
| Lightweight | Dustin Poirier | def. | Jim Miller | Decision (majority) (28–28, 30–27, 29–28) | 3 | 5:00 |
Preliminary Card (Fox Sports 1)
| Welterweight | Belal Muhammad | def. | Randy Brown | Decision (unanimous) (30–27, 30–27, 29–28) | 3 | 5:00 |
| Flyweight | Wilson Reis | def. | Ulka Sasaki | Decision (unanimous) (29–28, 29–28, 29–28) | 3 | 5:00 |
| Lightweight | Islam Makhachev | def. | Nik Lentz | Decision (unanimous) (30–25, 30–25, 30–27) | 3 | 5:00 |
| Featherweight | Ricky Glenn | def. | Phillipe Nover | Decision (split) (27–30, 29–28, 29–28) | 3 | 5:00 |
Preliminary Card (UFC Fight Pass)
| Welterweight | Ryan LaFlare | def. | Roan Carneiro | Decision (unanimous) (30–26, 30–27, 29–28) | 3 | 5:00 |

== Bonus awards ==
The following fighters were awarded $50,000 bonuses:

- Fight of the Night: Dustin Poirier vs. Jim Miller
- Performance of the Night: Ronaldo Souza

== Aftermath ==
On February 15, it was announced that Holm filed a complaint against referee Todd Anderson and an appeal of the result, asking the NYSAC to review Anderson's "failure to deduct one or more points from Germaine de Randamie following her repeated strikes thrown after the horn sounded to end rounds 2 and 3." Thirteen days later, the NYSAC denied Holm's appeal.

On June 20, Sullivan was officially suspended for his second anti-doping offense by USADA, receiving a one-year term for his failed test. He had disclosed he was taking prescription fertility medication and provided medical records to document his treatment, which wound up helping him when punishment was considered. His positive test was caused by clomiphene citrate, which "he was using in a therapeutic dose under the care of a physician to treat a medical condition," USADA said in a statement. They determined that Sullivan's degree of fault was reduced because "his use of clomiphene citrate was under the care of his physician for a documented medical condition. Accordingly, Sullivan received a reduction to one year from the standard two-year period of ineligibility that could have been imposed for a second offense involving a specified substance." His period of ineligibility began January 14, the date of his positive test.

== See also ==
- 2017 in UFC
- List of UFC events
- Mixed martial arts in New York
