= Ian McCall =

Ian McCall may refer to:

- Ian McCall (fighter) (born 1984), mixed martial artist in the Ultimate Fighting Championship
- Ian McCall (footballer) (born 1964), Scottish football player and manager
