= 2003 in M-1 Global =

Mixed martial arts events

Information
- First date: April 6, 2003
- Last date: December 5, 2003

Events
- Total events: 5

Fights
- Total fights: 63

Chronology
| 2002 in M-1 | 2003 in M-1 Global | 2004 in M-1 |

The year 2003 is the seventh year in the history of M-1 Global, a mixed martial arts promotion based in Russia. In 2003 M-1 Global held five events between April and December.

== Events list ==
| # | Event title | Date | Arena | Location |
|---|---|---|---|---|
| 21 | M-1 MFC: Russia vs. The World 7 | December 5, 2003 | | Saint Petersburg, Russia |
| 20 | M-1 MFC: Russia vs. The World 6 | October 10, 2003 | | Moscow, Russia |
| 19 | M-1 MFC: Russia vs. Ukraine | June 17, 2003 | Casino Conti Giant Hall | Saint Petersburg, Russia |
| 18 | M-1 MFC: Northwest Open Cup | May 22, 2003 | | Saint Petersburg, Russia |
| 17 | M-1 MFC: Russia vs. The World 5 | April 6, 2003 | Yubileyny Sports Palace | Saint Petersburg, Russia |

== M-1 MFC: Russia vs. The World 5 ==
M-1 MFC: Russia vs. The World 5 was an event held on April 6, 2003 at Sports Hall "Jubileiniy" in Saint Petersburg, Russia.

=== Results ===
Main Card
| Weight class | | | | Method | Round | Time | Notes |
|---|---|---|---|---|---|---|---|
| | Arman Gambaryan | def. | Ruben Vazquez | Submission (Kimura) | 1 | 8:00 |
| | Luiz Firmino | def. | Musail Alaudinov | Decision (Unanimous) | 1 | 15:00 |
| | Ibragim Magomedov | def. | Valentijn Overeem | TKO (Punches) | 1 | 3:20 |
| | Roman Zentsov | def. | Thomas Rahders | TKO (Punches) | 1 | 0:20 |
| | Sergey Kaznovsky | def. | Martin Tondryk | TKO (Punches) | 1 | 1:00 |
| | Mike Pyle | vs. | Andrei Semenov | Draw | 1 | 10:00 |
| | Melvin Manhoef | def. | Alexandr Garkushenko | TKO (Punches) | 1 | 6:57 |
| | Alexei Veselovzorov | def. | Antonio Navarro | TKO (Punches) | 1 | 6:50 |
| | Milton Vieira | def. | Magomed Dzhabrailov | Decision (Unanimous) | 1 | 10:00 |
| | Nikolai Kudryashov | def. | George Nunga | KO (Punch) | 1 | 1:35 |
| | Islam Karimov | def. | Furdjel de Windt | Decision (Unanimous) | 1 | 10:00 |
| | Thomas Hytten | def. | Maxim Rudenski | Submission (Triangle Choke) | 1 | 1:05 |
| | Sergey Golyaev | def. | Magomed Khimelov | Submission (Armlock) | 1 | 1:43 |
| | Ovagim Manusajan | def. | Seifullakh Agabaev | Decision (Unanimous) | 1 | 10:00 |
| | Ansar Chalangov | def. | Denis Komkin | Decision (Unanimous) | 1 | 10:00 |
| | Magomed Khimelov | def. | Arut Mesokyan | Decision (Unanimous) | 1 | 10:00 |
| | Sergey Golyaev | def. | Sergei Betsky | Submission (Armbar) | 1 | 1:43 |

== M-1 MFC: Northwest Open Cup ==
M-1 MFC: Northwest Open Cup was an event held on May 22, 2003 in Saint Petersburg, Russia.

=== Results ===
Main Card
| Weight class | | | | Method | Round | Time | Notes |
|---|---|---|---|---|---|---|---|
| | Bashir Guliev | def. | Mikhail Bogdanov | TKO | 0 | 0:00 |
| | Danila Veselov | def. | Igor Vasilyev | TKO | 0 | 0:00 |
| | Denis Komkin | def. | Seifullakh Agabaev | N/A | 0 | 0:00 |
| | Seifullakh Agabaev | def. | Denis Kolotukhin | N/A | 0 | 0:00 |
| | Denis Komkin | def. | Pavel Kositchkiy | KO | 0 | 0:00 |
| | Arut Mesokyan | def. | Magomed Khimelov | Decision | 0 | 0:00 |
| | Magomed Khimelov | def. | Islam Radzhabov | N/A | 0 | 0:00 |
| | Arut Mesokyan | def. | Abdulmuslim Yakubov | N/A | 0 | 0:00 |

== M-1 MFC: Russia vs. Ukraine ==
M-1 MFC: Russia vs. Ukraine was an event held on June 17, 2003 at The Casino Conti Giant Hall in Saint Petersburg, Russia.

=== Results ===
Main Card
| Weight class | | | | Method | Round | Time | Notes |
|---|---|---|---|---|---|---|---|
| | Roman Zentsov | def. | Andrey Jangolenko | Submission (Punches) | 1 | 0:16 |
| | Sergey Jangolenko | vs. | Denis Kolotukhin | Draw | 2 | 5:00 |
| | Bashir Guliev | def. | Valery Nemykin | Submission (Punches) | 1 | 0:29 |
| | Vitaly Kanevets | def. | Ovagim Manusajan | Submission (Achilles Lock) | 1 | 1:49 |
| | Sergey Golyaev | def. | Sergei Pashenko | Decision (Unanimous) | 2 | 5:00 |
| | Igor Abaev | def. | Artak Muradjan | KO (Punch) | 1 | 2:59 |
| | Karen Grigoryan | def. | Alexey Ivanov | Submission (Rear-Naked Choke) | 1 | 1:18 |
| | Konstantin Vasilev | def. | Evgeni Lutsi | Submission (Rear-Naked Choke) | 2 | 1:17 |
| | Ali Ezerbiyev | def. | Rashad Bajramov | Submission (Armbar) | 1 | 3:35 |
| | Magomed Magomedrasulov | def. | Vladimir Magomedshayshafiev | Submission (Triangle Choke) | 1 | 3:47 |

== M-1 MFC: Russia vs. The World 6 ==
M-1 MFC: Russia vs. The World 6 was an event held on October 10, 2003 in Moscow, Russia.

=== Results ===
Main Card
| Weight class | | | | Method | Round | Time | Notes |
|---|---|---|---|---|---|---|---|
| | Daniel Tabera | def. | Sergey Kaznovsky | Decision (Unanimous) | 1 | 10:00 |
| | Roman Zentsov | def. | Bob Schrijber | Submission (Rear-Naked Choke) | 1 | 2:12 |
| | Martin Malkhasyan | def. | Igor Komisarov | Submission (Armbar) | 1 | 1:15 |
| | Amar Suloev | def. | Yushin Okami | TKO (Punches) | 1 | 4:44 |
| | Andrei Semenov | def. | Chris Albandia | TKO (Punches) | 1 | 0:50 |
| | Arman Gambaryan | def. | Fabricio Moura | Submission (Rear-Naked Choke) | 1 | 2:11 |
| | Mikhail Bogdanov | def. | Thomas Rahders | Submission (Punches) | 1 | 0:21 |
| | Denis Komkin | def. | Tulio Palhares | Submission (Achilles Lock) | 1 | 1:37 |
| | Ansar Chalangov | def. | Vladimir Yushko | Submission (Armbar) | 1 | 2:16 |
| | Musail Alaudinov | def. | Joakim Engberg | Submission (Punches) | 1 | 6:59 |
| | Keith Wisniewski | def. | Danila Veselov | Submission (Guillotine Choke) | 1 | 1:54 |
| | Ovagim Manusajan | def. | Igor Abaev | Submission (Armbar) | 1 | 2:51 |
| | Alexey Prokofiev | def. | Alexandr Sukharev | Submission (Rear-Naked Choke) | 1 | 5:04 |
| | Yuri Ivlev | def. | Sergey Golyaev | Submission (Armbar) | 1 | 2:35 |

== M-1 MFC: Russia vs. The World 7 ==
M-1 MFC: Russia vs. The World 7 was an event held on December 5, 2003 in Saint Petersburg, Russia.

=== Results ===
Main Card
| Weight class | | | | Method | Round | Time | Notes |
|---|---|---|---|---|---|---|---|
| | Gilbert Yvel | vs. | Daniel Tabera | Draw | 1 | 10:00 |
| | Fatih Kocamis | def. | Arman Gambaryan | Submission (Punches) | 1 | 8:00 |
| | Sergey Kaznovsky | def. | Slavomir Molnar | TKO (Punches) | 1 | 2:34 |
| | Kassim Annan | def. | Mikhail Bogdanov | Submission (Triangle Choke) | 1 | 3:40 |
| | Bashir Guliev | def. | Stefan Crnko | TKO (Punches) | 1 | 0:15 |
| | Denis Kang | vs. | Andrei Semenov | Draw | 1 | 10:00 |
| | Alexei Veselovzorov | def. | Brad Lynde | Submission (Guillotine Choke) | 1 | 1:51 |
| | Ansar Chalangov | def. | Dave Strasser | Submission (Guillotine Choke) | 1 | 0:53 |
| | Denis Komkin | def. | Yuji Hisamatsu | TKO (Punches) | 1 | 0:16 |
| | Alexey Prokofiev | def. | Loic Pora | Submission (Rear-Naked Choke) | 1 | 2:02 |
| | Musail Alaudinov | def. | Yuji Hoshino | TKO (Punches) | 1 | 0:13 |
| | Sergei Bal | vs. | Magomed Magomedrasulov | Draw | 1 | 10:00 |
| | Vasily Krilov | def. | Ramin Tagiev | Decision (Unanimous) | 1 | 10:00 |
| | Karen Grigoryan | def. | Roman Galako | Submission (Rear-Naked Choke) | 1 | 2:06 |

== See also ==
- M-1 Global
