= 2005 in M-1 Global =

Mixed martial arts events

Information
- First date: December 8, 2005
- Last date: February 5, 2005

Events
- Total events: 5

Fights
- Total fights: 34

Chronology
2004 in M-1	2005 in M-1 Global	2006 in M-1

The year 2005 is the ninth year in the history of M-1 Global, a mixed martial arts promotion based in Russia. In 2005 M-1 Global held 5 events beginning with, M-1 MFC: International Fight Night.

== Events list ==
#	Event title	Date	Arena	Location
33	M-1 MFC: Lightweight Cup	December 8, 2005		Saint Petersburg, Russia
32	M-1 MFC: Russia vs. France	November 3, 2005		Saint Petersburg, Russia
31	M-1 MFC: New Blood	October 1, 2005		Saint Petersburg, Russia
30	M-1 MFC: Mix-fight	April 10, 2005		Russia
29	M-1 MFC: International Fight Night	February 5, 2005		Saint Petersburg, Russia

== M-1 MFC: International Fight Night ==
M-1 MFC: International Fight Night was an event held on February 5, 2005, in Saint Petersburg, Russia.

=== Results ===
Main Card
Weight class				Method	Round	Time	Notes
	Ramazan Akhadullaev	def.	Aleksey Bogoslovsky	TKO (Punches)	2	1:59
	Gegard Mousasi	def.	Erik Oganov	Submission (Rear-Naked Choke)	1	2:16
	Andrei Sen	def.	Abdulatip Abdulatipov	TKO (Punches)	0	N/A
	Sergey Golyaev	def.	Pavel Lesko	Submission (Armbar)	1	2:15
	Baga Agaev	def.	Dmitry Zabolotny	Decision	3	5:00
	Sergei Boikov	def.	Ramin Tagiev	TKO (Punches)	3	N/A
	Alexander Yakovlev	def.	Dmitry Sokov	TKO (Punches)	1	1:32
	Said Khalilov	def.	Dmitry Pavlov	Decision	3	5:00
	Gela Beridze	def.	Magomed Tugayev	Submission (Leg Lock)	1	4:43

== M-1 MFC: Mix-fight ==
M-1 MFC: Mix-fight was an event held on April 10, 2005, in Saint Petersburg, Russia.

=== Results ===
Main Card
Weight class				Method	Round	Time	Notes
	Alexander Yakovlev	def.	Danila Veselov	Decision (Unanimous)	2	5:00

== M-1 MFC: New Blood ==
M-1 MFC: New Blood was an event held on October 1, 2005, in Saint Petersburg, Russia.

=== Results ===
Main Card
Weight class				Method	Round	Time	Notes
	Alexei Belyaev	def.	Vakhtang Kintsurashvili	Decision	3	5:00
	Alexander Shlemenko	def.	Ubaidula Chopolaev	Decision	2	5:00
	Alexander Yakovlev	def.	Oleg Glazunov	KO	1	1:40
	Sergey Golyaev	def.	Rustam Kuraev	Submission (Armbar)	1	2:40
	Said Khalilov	def.	Roman Shurubkin	KO	1	4:05
	Mikhail Malyutin	def.	Yunus Evloev	KO	1	4:54
	Arthur Guseinov	def.	Sergei Shinkarev	Submission (Rear Naked Choke)	1	3:56

== M-1 MFC: Russia vs. France ==
M-1 MFC: Russia vs. France was an event held on November 3, 2005, in Saint Petersburg, Russia.

=== Results ===
Main Card
Weight class				Method	Round	Time	Notes
	Roman Zentsov	def.	Ibragim Magomedov	KO	2	4:08
	Alexander Shlemenko	def.	Sergey Naumov	TKO	2	4:50
	Ramazan Akhadullaev	def.	Marc Emmanuel	Submission (Choke)	1	2:36
	Boris Jonstomp	def.	Said Khalilov	TKO (Corner Stoppage)	2	5:00
	Amar Suloev	def.	Damien Riccio	KO	1	1:25
	Gregory Bouchelaghem	def.	Andrei Semenov	Decision	3	5:00
	Arman Gambaryan	def.	Moise Rimbon	Decision	3	5:00
	Erik Oganov	def.	Makhtar Gueye	Submission (Armbar)	1	3:19
	Yuri Ivlev	def.	Bendy Casimir	Submission (Armbar)	1	4:54

== M-1 MFC: Lightweight Cup ==
M-1 MFC: Lightweight Cup was an event held on December 8, 2005, in Saint Petersburg, Russia.

=== Results ===
Main Card
Weight class				Method	Round	Time	Notes
	Vladimir Zenin	def.	Amir Shankhalov	Submission (Rear Naked Choke)	1	2:02
	Amir Shankhalov	def.	Mikhail Malyutin	Decision (Unanimous)	2	5:00
	Vladimir Zenin	def.	Maxim Kochetov	Submission (Armbar)	1	2:16
	Mikhail Malyutin	def.	Bagavdin Gadzhimuradov	Decision (Majority)	2	5:00
	Amir Shankhalov	def.	Yuri Ivlev	Decision (Unanimous)	2	5:00
	Vladimir Zenin	def.	Rustam Tashuev	Submission (Rear Naked Choke)	1	1:21
	Abdula Mutalimov	def.	Alexander Grebenkin	Decision (Unanimous)	2	5:00
	Alexei Belyaev	def.	Victor Evgrafov	Submission (Rear Naked Choke)	1	1:04

== See also ==
- M-1 Global
