= Sergey Golyaev =

Russian mixed martial arts fighter

- Born: 3 November 1981 (age 44); Russian SFSR, Soviet Union
- Nationality: Russian
- Height: 1.83 m (6 ft 0 in)
- Weight: 71 kg (157 lb; 11.2 st)
- Division: Lightweight; Welterweight
- Style: Muay Thai, Karate
- Fighting out of: St. Petersburg, Russia
- Team: Action-Force Fight Team

Mixed martial arts record
- Total: 34
- Wins: 23
- By knockout: 6
- By submission: 12
- By decision: 5
- Losses: 11
- By submission: 9
- By decision: 2

Other information
- Mixed martial arts record from Sherdog

Sergey Golyaev (born November 3, 1981) is a Russian mixed martial artist.

== Background ==
Sergey Golyaev has a Muay Thai and Karate background. He started to be engaged in karate at 14 years old and his Muay Thai experience dates back 9 years.

== Mixed martial arts career ==
Sergey Golyaev pulled the upset win against the No.1 lightweight Takanori Gomi in World Victory Road Presents: Sengoku 6 back in November 2008. This was considered a huge upset win and Gomi was no longer considered to be the greatest lightweight and dropped from the Top 10 rankings.

== Accomplishments ==
=== Mixed martial arts ===
- Sherdog Upset of the Year: 2008 - Sergey Golyaev vs. Takanori Gomi

=== Muay Thai ===
- Saint Petersburg open Muay Thai champion.
- Two time Russian lightweight Muay Thai champion.
- Russian North-West regions Muay Thai champion.

== Mixed martial arts record ==
Professional record breakdown
34 matches	23 wins	11 losses
By knockout	6	0
By submission	12	9
By decision	5	2

Res.	Record	Opponent	Method	Event	Date	Round	Time	Location	Notes
Loss	23-11	Ivan Buchinger	Submission (rear-naked choke)	M-1 Challenge 47	April 4, 2014	1	N/A	Orenburg, Russia	
Win	23-10	Dzhumabek Aktilek	TKO (punches)	SVS MMA-Commonwealth Cup 2012	December 8, 2012	2	1:55		
Win	22-10	Kuat Khamitov	Submission (Arm-Triangle Choke)	Bushido Lithuania: vol. 51	June 8, 2012	2	0:36		
Win	21-10	Ott Tonissaar	Submission (Armbar)	Lion's Fights 1: The Beginning	March 3, 2012	1	1:37		
Win	20-10	Djamshed Mavlonov	TKO (Doctor Stoppage)	League of Combat Sambo: Cup of Ismail Somani	January 20, 2012	1	1:02		
Win	19-10	Ramon Diaz	KO (Punch)	League S-70: Sambo 70 vs. Spain	April 21, 2011	2	3:40		
Win	18-10	Eduard Pestrak	Submission (Achilles Lock)	NOFC 1: New Order Fighting Championship	April 9, 2011	1	2:21		
Loss	17-10	Ali Bagov	Submission (Rear-Naked Choke)	ProFC: Union Nation Cup 11	December 25, 2010	1	4:54		
Loss	17-9	Ruslan Kelekhsaev	Decision (Unanimous)	Draka: Governor's Cup 2010	December 18, 2010	2	5:00		
Loss	17-8	John Alessio	Submission (Kimura)	United Glory 12	October 16, 2010	2	01:51		Welterweight Tournament quarterfinal bout
Win	17-7	Ivan Buchinger	KO (Punch)	APF: Azerbaijan vs. Europe	May 22, 2010	1	00:20		
Win	16-7	Artiom Damkovsky	Decision (Split)	Bushido FC: Legends	November 28, 2009	3	05:00		
Win	15-7	Danny van Bergen	TKO (Punches)	Bushido FC: Legends	November 28, 2009	1	04:57		
Win	14-7	Shamil Zagirov	Submission (Armbar)	ProFC: Union Nation Cup 2	September 25, 2009	1	02:30		
Loss	13-7	Eiji Mitsuoka	Submission (Armbar)	World Victory Road Presents: Sengoku no Ran 2009	January 4, 2009	1	04:22		
Win	13-6	Takanori Gomi	Decision (Split)	World Victory Road Presents: Sengoku 6	November 1, 2008	3	05:00		Sherdog 2008 Upset of the Year
Win	12-6	Aleksandr Dalishniy	TKO (Punches)	Shooto Russia: Against The War	September 26, 2008	2	02:20		
Win	11-6	Vladimir Soroka	Decision	FOP: Fire of Persevit	December 2, 2006	N/A	N/A		
Win	10-6	Thomas Hytten	Decision (Unanimous)	Zst: Prestige	September 23, 2006	3	05:00		
Win	9-6	Rustam Kuraev	Submission (Armbar)	M-1 MFC: New Blood	October 1, 2005	1	02:40		
Loss	8-6	Kurt Pellegrino	Submission (Arm-Triangle Choke)	Euphoria: USA vs. Russia	May 14, 2005	1	03:24		
Loss	8-5	Furdjel de Windt	Submission (Rear Naked Choke)	JE: Holland vs Russia	March 24, 2005	3	N/A		
Win	8-4	Pavel Lesko	Submission (Armbar)	M-1 MFC: International Fight Night	February 5, 2005	1	02:15		
Win	7-4	Said Khalilov	Submission (Triangle Choke)	M-1 MFC: Heavyweight GP	December 4, 2004	1	01:14		
Loss	6-4	Joachim Hansen	Submission (Rear Naked Choke)	Euphoria: Road to the Titles	October 15, 2004	1	03:24		
Win	6-3	Dmitriy Megrobyan	Submission (Triangle Choke)	M-1 MFC: Mix-Fight	May 21, 2004	N/A	N/A		
Loss	5-3	Rich Clementi	Submission (Triangle Choke)	Euphoria: Russia vs USA	March 13, 2004	2	03:43		
Loss	5-2	Yuri Ivlev	Submission (Armbar)	M-1 MFC: Russia vs. the World 6	October 10, 2003	1	02:35		
Win	5-1	Sergei Pashenko	Decision (Unanimous)	M-1 MFC: Russia vs. Ukraine	June 17, 2003	2	05:00		
Win	4-1	Magomed Khimelov	Submission (Armlock)	M-1 MFC: Russia vs. the World 5	April 6, 2003	1	01:43		
Win	3-1	Sergei Betsky	Submission (Armbar)	M-1 MFC: Russia vs. the World 5	April 6, 2003	1	01:43		
Loss	2-1	Colin Mannsur	Decision (1-0 Points)	FFH: Free Fight Explosion 2	June 23, 2002	2	05:00		
Win	2-0	Rasim Kasumov	Submission (Triangle Choke)	M-1 MFC: Exclusive Fight Night 3	September 27, 2001	1	02:45		
Win	1-0	Matvey Pereshivailo	Submission (Armbar)	M-1 MFC: Exclusive Fight Night 2	June 28, 2001	1	02:10		
