= 2006 in M-1 Global =

Mixed martial arts events

Information
- First date: February 18, 2006
- Last date: November 18, 2006

Events
- Total events: 6

Fights
- Total fights: 34

Chronology
2005 in M-1	2006 in M-1 Global	2007 in M-1

The year 2006 is the tenth year in the history of M-1 Global, a mixed martial arts promotion based in Russia. In 2006 M-1 Global held 6 events beginning with, M-1 MFC: Mix Fight.

== Events list ==
#	Event title	Date	Arena	Location
39	M-1: International Fight Night 6	November 18, 2006		Saint Petersburg, Russia
38	M-1: Mix-Fight Tournament	October 12, 2006		Russia
37	M-1 MFC: Mix-Fight	October 7, 2006		Russia
36	M-1 MFC: Mix-fight	June 15, 2006		Russia
35	M-1 MFC: Russia vs. Europe	April 8, 2006		Saint Petersburg, Russia
34	M-1 MFC: Mix Fight	February 18, 2006		Saint Petersburg, Russia

== M-1 MFC: Mix Fight ==
M-1 MFC: Mix Fight was an event held on February 18, 2006, in Saint Petersburg, Russia.

=== Results ===
Main Card
Weight class				Method	Round	Time	Notes
	Baga Agaev	def.	Sergei Kotin	Submission (Rear Naked Choke)	1	1:25
	Said Khalilov	def.	Mali Magomedaliev	Decision (Unanimous)	2	5:00
	Alexey Prokofiev	def.	Timur Gasanov	Submission (Armbar)	2	2:37
	Alexei Belyaev	def.	Sergei Boikov	Decision (Unanimous)	2	5:00
	Amir Shankhalov	def.	Maxim Kochetov	Decision (Unanimous)	2	5:00
	Gocha Markoziya	def.	Jujuev Zaodin	Decision (Unanimous)	2	5:00

== M-1 MFC: Russia vs. Europe ==
M-1 MFC: Russia vs. Europe was an event held on April 8, 2006, in Saint Petersburg, Russia.

=== Results ===
Main Card
Weight class				Method	Round	Time	Notes
	Martin Malkhasyan	def.	Peter Mulder	Submission (Rear Naked Choke)	1	2:28
	Besiki Gerenava	def.	Gewik Mousasi	Submission (Rear Naked Choke)	1	2:01
	Arman Gambaryan	def.	Boris Jonstomp	Decision (Unanimous)	2	5:00
	David Baron	def.	Erik Oganov	TKO (Punches)	2	3:12
	Ramil Kurmantaev	def.	Michal Hansgut	Decision (Unanimous)	2	5:00
	Porfirio Alves Jr.	def.	Said Khalilov	TKO (Punches)	1	4:15
	Vladimir Zenin	def.	Rachid Nassoudi	KO	1	3:33
	Yuri Ivlev	def.	Per Eklund	Decision (Unanimous)	2	5:00
	Alexei Belyaev	def.	Vladislav Kiselev	Decision (Unanimous)	2	5:00
	Amir Shankhalov	def.	Yunus Evloev	Decision (Unanimous)	2	5:00

== M-1 MFC: Mix-Fight ==
M-1 MFC: Mix-Fight was an event held on June 15, 2006, in Russia.

=== Results ===
Main Card
Weight class				Method	Round	Time	Notes
	Alexander Yakovlev	def.	Alexander Grebenkin	TKO (Punches)	1	0:00

== M-1 MFC: Mix-Fight ==
M-1 MFC: Mix-Fight was an event held on October 7, 2006, in Russia.

=== Results ===
Main Card
Weight class				Method	Round	Time	Notes
	Mikhail Zayats	def.	Christophe Durant	Decision (Unanimous)	3	5:00
	Dmitry Samoilov	def.	Jean Pierre Bassette	Submission (Armbar)	1	0:37
	Norman Paraisy	def.	Rustam Kuraev	Decision (Split)	3	5:00
	Makhtar Gueye	def.	Mikhail Malyutin	Decision	3	5:00

== M-1: Mix-Fight Tournament ==
M-1: Mix-Fight Tournament was an event held on October 12, 2006, in Russia.

=== Results ===
Main Card
Weight class				Method	Round	Time	Notes
	Roman Zentsov	def.	Min Jin Lee	Submission (Guillotine Choke)	1	0:55
	Besiki Gerenava	def.	Tamerlan Urtaev	TKO (Corner Stoppage)	1	5:00
	Alexander Yakovlev	def.	Andrei Simykin	TKO	3	1:40
	Islam Karimov	def.	Sergei Bytchkov	Submission (Heel Hook)	1	3:15
	Vladimir Zenin	def.	Yuri Ivlev	Decision (Unanimous)	3	5:00

== M-1: International Fight Night 6 ==
M-1: International Fight Night 6 was an event held on November 18, 2006, in Saint Petersburg, Russia.

=== Results ===
Main Card
Weight class				Method	Round	Time	Notes
	Rotmir Alirzaev	def.	Kazmir Filip	TKO (Punches to the Body)	1	4:24
	Alexander Grebenkin	def.	Artur Korchemny	Decision (Unanimous)	2	5:00
	Alexander Yakovlev	def.	Ishkhan Zakharian	TKO (Punches)	1	3:26
	Said Khalilov	def.	Rustam Kuraev	TKO (Punches)	2	2:09
	Mikhail Malyutin	def.	Gocha Markoziya	Submission (Triangle Choke)	1	3:09
	Artur Guseinov	def.	Dmitry Shovenko	Submission (Rear-Naked Choke)	1	1:45
	Amir Shankhalov	def.	Islam Karimov	Decision (Unanimous)	3	5:00
	Yunus Evloev	def.	Pavel Radjabov	N/A	1	1:15
