= Yegor Yakovlev =

Russian journalist

- Yegor Yakovlev during an interview on Echo Moskvy radio
- Born: March 14, 1930; Moscow
- Died: September 18, 2005 (aged 75); Moscow
- Resting place: Novodevichy Cemetery
- Education: Moscow History and Archive Institute
- Occupation: Journalist
- Children: Vladimir
- Father: Vladimir Yakovlev

Yegor Vladimirovich Yakovlev (Russian: Егор Владимирович Яковлев; 14 March 1930 – 18 September 2005) was one of the founders of Mikhail Gorbachev and Boris Yeltsin's policy of glasnost, and one of the most respected Russian journalists.

His father, Vladimir Yakovlev, was a Soviet security agent. Yegor Yakovlev graduated from Moscow's History and Archives Institute in 1954. In 1966, he became an editor-in-chief of the Sovietskaya Pechat journal which was later renamed Journalist. In 1968, he continued his career in journalism as a special correspondent with the Izvestia newspaper.

In 1981 he narrated the documentary "Rabotat khorosho vsegda trudno" which covered the Volzhsky Automobile Plant in Russia. Yakovlev worked in Prague for three years during that period and returned there as a resident correspondent in 1985-1986. In August 1986, he was appointed editor-in-chief of the Moscow News, which he turned from an English-language voice of Soviet propaganda into one of the most popular and widely read papers of the era of perestroika and glasnost.

In 1991-1992, he was the chairman of All-Soviet Television Company (VGTRK). In 1993, he became a publisher of Obschaya Gazeta which he sold in 2002. Yakovlev won several international awards, including the John Paul II medal. He also authored several books. His son Vladimir is also a journalist; he is a founder and an editor-in-chief of the Kommersant Newspaper, the first Russian daily business-oriented newspaper.
