= Alexander Yakovlev (fighter) =

Russian mixed martial arts fighter (born 1984)

- Born: July 18, 1984 (age 42); Veliky Novgorod, Russian SFSR, Soviet Union
- Native name: Александр Яковлев
- Other names: Thunder of the North
- Nationality: Russian
- Height: 6 ft 3 in (1.91 m)
- Weight: 170 lb (77 kg; 12 st)
- Division: Light Heavyweight; Middleweight; Welterweight; Lightweight
- Reach: 74 in (188 cm)
- Fighting out of: St. Petersburg, Leningrad, Russia; Fairfield, New Jersey, United States
- Team: K-Dojo Warrior Tribe
- Rank: Master of Sports in Hand-to-hand combat Master of Sports in Sport Sambo; Master of Sports in Combat Sambo; Master of Sports in Freestyle Wrestling
- Years active: 2004–present

Mixed martial arts record
- Total: 39
- Wins: 25
- By knockout: 9
- By submission: 9
- By decision: 7
- Losses: 13
- By knockout: 1
- By submission: 5
- By decision: 7
- Draws: 1

Other information
- University: St. Petersburg Ministry of Internal Affair University
- Mixed martial arts record from Sherdog

Alexander Andreevich Yakovlev (born July 18, 1984), is a Russian mixed martial artist and rapper who competes in the Lightweight division. Yakovlev competed in the Ultimate Fighting Championship, M-1 Global, ProFC, Shooto Russia, and Bodog Fight promotions.

== Mixed martial arts career ==
=== M-Global ===
At the age of 19, Alexander made his professional MMA debut in a tournament for M-1 Global.

Yakovlev faced Shamil Zavurov on March 16, 2012, at M-1 Challenge 31, with the fight ending in a draw (judges scorecards: 29–28 Zavurov, 28–28, 28–28)

Yakovlev faced Rashid Magomedov on November 15, 2012, at M-1 Challenge 35. He lost the fight via unanimous decision.

Yakovlev faced Murad Abdulaev on April 9, 2013, at M-1 Challenge 38. He won via split decision.

Yakovlev faced UFC veteran Paul Daley on November 8, 2013, at Legend 2. He won via unanimous decision.

=== Ultimate Fighting Championship ===
On January 6, 2014, Yakovlev signed a contract with the UFC.

Yakovlev was initially expected to make his debut against Yan Cabral on May 10, 2014, at UFC Fight Night 40. However, on April 9, Yakovlev was moved to The Ultimate Fighter Brazil 3 Finale card as he replaced an injured Mike Pierce against Demian Maia. He lost the fight via unanimous decision.

Yakovlev fought Nico Musoke on October 4, 2014, at UFC Fight Night 53. He lost the fight via unanimous decision.

Yakovlev next dropped to the lightweight division and faced Gray Maynard on April 4, 2015, at UFC Fight Night 63. He won the fight by unanimous decision.

Yakovlev faced George Sullivan in the Welterweight at UFC on Fox 18 on January 30, 2016. He won the fight via knockout in the first round.

Yakovlev was expected to face Ryan LaFlare on July 23, 2016, at UFC on Fox 20. However, LaFlare pulled out of the fight in early June after sustaining an undisclosed injury and replaced by Kamaru Usman. He lost the one-sided fight via unanimous decision.

Yakovlev faced Zak Cummings at UFC Fight Night 99 on November 19, 2016. He lost the fight by submission due to armbar in the second round.

Yakovlev was expected to return from an extended hiatus to face Teemu Packalén on April 20, 2019, at UFC Fight Night 149. However on April 4, 2019, it was reported that Packalen pull out for undisclosed reason and he was replaced by Alex da Silva Coelho. Yakovlev won the fight via guillotine choke submission in the second round.

Yakovlev was scheduled to face Vinc Pichel on November 9, 2019, at UFC Fight Night 163 However, Pichel pulled out of the fight on October 24 citing an undisclosed injury and was replaced by Roosevelt Roberts. He lost the fight via unanimous decision.

Yakovlev faced Joel Álvarez on October 24, 2020, at UFC 254. At the weigh-ins, Álvarez weighed in at 159.5 pounds, three and a half pounds over the lightweight non-title fight limit. The bout proceeded at catchweight and Álvarez was fined 30% of his purse respectively, which went to Yakovlev. Yakovlev lost the fight via an armbar submission in the first round.

On June 17, 2021, it was announced that Yakovlev was released from the UFC.

=== Post UFC ===
In his first appearance after leaving the UFC, he faced Ali Abdulkhalikov on March 27, 2022, at ProFC 70. He lost the bout via unanimous decision.

Yakovlev faced Maxim Butorin on March 18, 2023, at AMC Fight Nights 119, losing the bout via unanimous decision.

== Championships and accomplishments ==
=== Sambo ===
- Russian Combat Sambo Federation
  - Medalist Russian Sambo Championship

=== Hand-to-hand combat ===
- Russian Union of Martial Arts
  - Medalist Russian Hand-to-hand combat Championships
  - Russian National Champion

=== Freestyle wrestling ===
- All-Russian Wrestling Federation
  - Medalist of Freestyle Wrestling National Tournament

=== Grappling ===
- NAGA
  - World Champion (2014, 187 lbs)

== Mixed martial arts record ==
Professional record breakdown
| 39 matches | 25 wins | 13 losses |
| By knockout | 9 | 1 |
| By submission | 9 | 5 |
| By decision | 7 | 7 |
| Draws | 1 | |

| Res. | Record | Opponent | Method | Event | Date | Round | Time | Location | Notes |
|---|---|---|---|---|---|---|---|---|---|
| Loss | 25–13–1 | Maxim Butorin | Decision (unanimous) | AMC Fight Nights 119 | March 18, 2023 | 3 | 5:00 | Ulyanovsk, Russia | Return to Welterweight. |
| Loss | 25–12–1 | Ali Abdulkhalikov | Decision (unanimous) | ProFC 70 | March 27, 2022 | 5 | 5:00 | Rostov-on-Don, Russia | For the ProFC Interim Lightweight Championship. |
| Loss | 25–11–1 | Joel Álvarez | Submission (armbar) | UFC 254 | October 24, 2020 | 1 | 3:00 | Abu Dhabi, United Arab Emirates | Catchweight (159.5 lb) bout; Álvarez missed weight. |
| Loss | 25–10–1 | Roosevelt Roberts | Decision (unanimous) | UFC Fight Night: Magomedsharipov vs. Kattar | November 9, 2019 | 3 | 5:00 | Moscow, Russia | |
| Win | 25–9–1 | Alex da Silva Coelho | Submission (guillotine choke) | UFC Fight Night: Overeem vs. Oleinik | April 20, 2019 | 2 | 3:10 | Saint Petersburg, Russia | Return to Lightweight. |
| Loss | 24–9–1 | Zak Cummings | Submission (straight armbar) | UFC Fight Night: Mousasi vs. Hall 2 | November 19, 2016 | 2 | 3:25 | Belfast, Northern Ireland | Catchweight (172.8 lb) bout; Cummings missed weight. |
| Loss | 24–8–1 | Kamaru Usman | Decision (unanimous) | UFC on Fox: Holm vs. Shevchenko | July 23, 2016 | 3 | 5:00 | Chicago, Illinois, United States | Yakovlev was deducted one point in round one for grabbing the cage. |
| Win | 24–7–1 | George Sullivan | KO (punches) | UFC on Fox: Johnson vs. Bader | January 30, 2016 | 1 | 3:59 | Newark, New Jersey, United States | Return to Welterweight. |
| Win | 23–7–1 | Gray Maynard | Decision (unanimous) | UFC Fight Night: Mendes vs. Lamas | April 4, 2015 | 3 | 5:00 | Fairfax, Virginia, United States | Lightweight debut. |
| Loss | 22–7–1 | Nico Musoke | Decision (unanimous) | UFC Fight Night: Nelson vs. Story | October 4, 2014 | 3 | 5:00 | Stockholm, Sweden | |
| Loss | 22–6–1 | Demian Maia | Decision (unanimous) | The Ultimate Fighter Brazil 3 Finale: Miocic vs. Maldonado | May 31, 2014 | 3 | 5:00 | São Paulo, Brazil | |
| Win | 22–5–1 | Paul Daley | Decision (unanimous) | Legend: Part 2: Invasion | November 8, 2013 | 3 | 5:00 | Moscow, Russia | |
| Win | 21–5–1 | Reinaldo da Silva | Decision (unanimous) | Fightspirit Championship 1 | September 8, 2013 | 2 | 5:00 | Kolpino, Russia | |
| Win | 20–5–1 | Murad Abdulaev | Decision (split) | M-1 Challenge 38 | April 9, 2013 | 3 | 5:00 | Saint Petersburg, Russia | |
| Loss | 19–5–1 | Rashid Magomedov | Decision (unanimous) | M-1 Challenge 35 | November 15, 2012 | 5 | 5:00 | Saint Petersburg, Russia | For the M-1 Global Welterweight Championship. |
| Draw | 19–4–1 | Shamil Zavurov | Draw (majority) | M-1 Challenge 31 | March 16, 2012 | 3 | 5:00 | Saint Petersburg, Russia | |
| Win | 19–4 | Juan Manuel Suarez | TKO (punches) | M-1 Global: Fedor vs. Monson | November 20, 2011 | 2 | 3:55 | Moscow, Russia | |
| Win | 18–4 | Christian Eckerlin | Submission (rear-naked choke) | M-1 Challenge 25: Zavurov vs. Enomoto | April 28, 2011 | 2 | 3:14 | Saint Petersburg, Russia | |
| Win | 17–4 | Dimitri Anghelou | Submission (rear-naked choke) | IM 1: Team Saint Petersburg vs. Team France | January 22, 2011 | 2 | 3:40 | Cherepovets, Russia | |
| Win | 16–4 | Khamid Gereyhanov | Submission (rear-naked choke) | Draka: Governor's Cup 2010 | December 18, 2010 | 1 | N/A | Khabarovsk, Russia | Return to Welterweight. |
| Win | 15–4 | Vahe Tadevosyan | Submission (triangle choke) | ProFC: Union Nation Cup 7 | August 6, 2010 | 1 | 4:55 | Rostov-on-Don, Russia | |
| Loss | 14–4 | Jacob McClintock | Submission (armbar) | fightFORCE: Day of Anger | February 28, 2009 | 1 | 4:59 | Saint Petersburg, Russia | Welterweight bout. |
| Win | 14–3 | Yuri Pulaev | Submission (rear-naked choke) | Shooto Russia: Against The War | September 26, 2008 | 1 | 3:00 | Saint Petersburg, Russia | |
| Win | 13–3 | Alexander Kokoev | Submission (rear-naked choke) | Bodog Fight: USA vs. Russia | November 30, 2007 | 2 | 4:43 | Moscow, Russia | |
| Win | 12–3 | Gigam Matevosian | Decision (unanimous) | PGM: Russia vs. Novgorod | November 24, 2007 | 2 | 5:00 | Velikiy Novgorod, Russia | Light Heavyweight bout. |
| Win | 11–3 | Gigam Matevosian | Submission (triangle choke) | PGM: Russia vs. Novgorod | April 28, 2007 | 2 | 2:15 | Velikiy Novgorod, Russia | Light Heavyweight bout. |
| Loss | 10–3 | Karl Amoussou | Submission (armbar) | M-1 MFC: International Mix Fight | March 17, 2007 | 1 | 1:44 | Saint Petersburg, Russia | |
| Win | 10–2 | Ishkhan Zakharian | TKO (punches) | M-1: International Fight Night 6 | November 18, 2006 | 1 | 3:26 | Saint Petersburg, Russia | |
| Win | 9–2 | Andrei Simykin | TKO (punches) | M-1: Mix-Fight Tournament | October 12, 2006 | 3 | 1:40 | Saint Petersburg, Russia | Middleweight debut. |
| Win | 8–2 | Alexander Grebenkin | TKO (punches) | M-1 MFC: Mix-fight | June 15, 2006 | 1 | N/A | Saint Petersburg, Russia | Light Heavyweight debut. |
| Win | 7–2 | Oleg Glazunov | KO (punches) | M-1 MFC: New Blood | October 1, 2005 | 2 | 1:40 | Saint Petersburg, Russia | |
| Win | 6–2 | Danila Veselov | Decision (unanimous) | M-1 MFC: Mix-fight | April 10, 2005 | 2 | 5:00 | Saint Petersburg, Russia | |
| Win | 5–2 | Artur Korchemny | TKO (punches) | CF: Champions Fight | February 25, 2005 | 1 | 3:20 | Saint Petersburg, Russia | |
| Win | 4–2 | Dmitry Sokov | TKO (punches) | M-1 MFC: International Fight Nights | February 5, 2005 | 1 | 1:32 | Saint Petersburg, Russia | |
| Loss | 3–2 | Magomed Tugayev | Submission (armbar) | M-1 MFC: Mix-Fight | May 21, 2004 | N/A | N/A | Saint Petersburg, Russia | |
| Win | 3–1 | Vladimir Magomedshayshafiev | Submission (rear-naked choke) | M-1 MFC: Mix-Fight | April 10, 2004 | N/A | N/A | Saint Petersburg, Russia | |
| Win | 2–1 | Vladimir Magomedshayshafiev | TKO (punches) | M-1 MFC: Mix-Fight | February 21, 2004 | N/A | N/A | Saint Petersburg, Russia | Welterweight debut. |
| Loss | 1–1 | Alexander Shlemenko | TKO (punches) | IAFC: Stage of Russia Cup 3 | 19 February 2004 | 2 | N/A | Omsk, Russia | Stage of Russia Cup 3 Final. |
| Win | 1–0 | Dmitry Iliyicin | Decision (unanimous) | IAFC: Stage of Russia Cup 3 | 19 February 2004 | 2 | 5:00 | Omsk, Russia | Stage of Russia Cup 3 Semifinal |

== Discography ==
- Examen (Exam) (2011)
- Bad Boy with D.Masta (2011)
- Money Power (2012)

== See also ==
- List of male mixed martial artists
