= Pavel Yakovlev =

Pavel Yakovlev may refer to:

- Pavel Yakovlev (athlete) (born 1958), Soviet runner
- Pavel Yakovlev (footballer) (born 1991), Russian footballer

== See also ==
- Yakovlev (surname)
