= Zak Cummings =

American mixed martial arts fighter

- Born: Zacharry Michael Cummings; August 2, 1984 (age 42); Irving, Texas, U.S.
- Height: 6 ft 0 in (1.83 m)
- Weight: 205 lb (93 kg; 14.6 st)
- Division: Welterweight; Middleweight; Light Heavyweight
- Reach: 74 1/2 in (189 cm)
- Fighting out of: Kansas City, Missouri, U.S.
- Team: Glory MMA and Fitness
- Rank: 2nd degree black belt in Brazilian Jiu-Jitsu under Leonardo "Léo" Peçanha
- Years active: 2007–2023

Mixed martial arts record
- Total: 32
- Wins: 25
- By knockout: 6
- By submission: 12
- By decision: 7
- Losses: 7
- By submission: 2
- By decision: 5

Other information
- University: Missouri State University
- Notable schools: Glendale High School; Meramec Community College
- Mixed martial arts record from Sherdog

Zacharry "Zak" Michael Cummings (born August 2, 1984) is an American former professional mixed martial artist, who competed in the Middleweight division of the Ultimate Fighting Championship. A professional competitor since 2007, he has also formerly competed for Strikeforce, MFC, Titan FC, and Bellator.

== Background ==
Born in Irving, Texas, Cummings moved to Springfield, Missouri, at the age of three. After beginning wrestling in the sixth grade, he attended Glendale High School where he competed in wrestling, as well as football, baseball, and basketball. A state qualifier, he later attended Meramec Community College where he was a two-time NJCAA national qualifier his freshman and sophomore seasons. Due to an injury, Cummings transferred to Missouri State University to finish his degree, majoring in exercise and movement science. It was around this time that he began to training in mixed martial arts, and was 6–0 as an amateur before turning professional.

== Mixed martial arts career ==
=== Early career ===
Cummings made his professional MMA debut in November 2007. He was undefeated for the first year and a half of his career, going 10–0 during that time period with a majority of his wins by TKO or submission.

This impressive streak earned him a shot in Strikeforce. He faced Tim Kennedy in the main event of Strikeforce Challengers 3, but lost via submission in the second round.

Post-Strikeforce, Cummings fought for various independent organizations and had one appearance for Bellator Fighting Championships. He added five more wins and two losses to his record during this time.

=== The Ultimate Fighter ===
In January 2013, it was revealed that Cummings was a cast member of The Ultimate Fighter: Team Jones vs. Team Sonnen. He won his preliminary bout over Nik Fekete quickly by TKO with the first punch he threw. Cummings was selected by Sonnen as his third pick (fifth overall).

Cummings faced Dylan Andrews in the elimination round. He lost via majority decision.

=== Ultimate Fighting Championship ===
Cummings made his debut against Ben Alloway on August 28, 2013, at UFC Fight Night: Condit vs. Kampmann 2. He won the fight via submission in the first round. The win also earned him his first Submission of the Night bonus award.

Cummings was expected to face Sérgio Moraes on November 30, 2013, at The Ultimate Fighter 18 Finale. However, Cummings and Moraes had to pull out of the event due to injury and were replaced by Sean Spencer and Drew Dober respectively.

Cummings was expected to face promotional newcomer Alberto Mina on March 1, 2014, at The Ultimate Fighter China Finale. However, at the weigh-ins for the event, Cummings came in eight pounds over the welterweight limit. On the advice of his coaches, Mina would not agree to compete at a catch weight, so the bout was scratched from the event.

Cummings faced Yan Cabral on May 10, 2014, at UFC Fight Night 40. He won the fight via unanimous decision.

Cummings was briefly linked to a bout with Kenny Robertson on July 16, 2014, at UFC Fight Night 45. However, Cummings was pulled from that fight in favor of a matchup with Gunnar Nelson on July 19, 2014 at UFC Fight Night 46 after his opponent Ryan LaFlare was removed from the card. He lost the fight via rear-naked choke.

Cummings was expected to face Antônio Braga Neto on July 25, 2015, at UFC on Fox 16. However, Braga Neto pulled out of the fight in early July and was replaced by promotional newcomer Dominique Steele. Cummings won the fight by TKO in the first round.

Cummings faced Nicolas Dalby on April 10, 2016, at UFC Fight Night 86, filling in for Bartosz Fabiński. He won the fight via unanimous decision.

Cummings next faced Santiago Ponzinibbio on August 6, 2016, at UFC Fight Night 92. He lost the fight via unanimous decision.

Cummings faced Alexander Yakovlev at UFC Fight Night 99 on November 19, 2016. He won the bout by submission in the second round.

Cummings faced Nathan Coy on April 15, 2017, at UFC on Fox 24. He won the fight via technical submission due to a guillotine choke in the first round.

Cummings was scheduled to face Thiago Alves on January 14, 2018, at UFC Fight Night: Stephens vs. Choi. On January 13, 2018, it was announced that Cummings injured his skull after a bathroom slip and the bout against Alves was cancelled as no replacement would be sought.

Cummings faced Michel Prazeres on May 19, 2018, at UFC Fight Night 129. He lost the back-and-forth fight via split decision.

Cummings faced Trevor Smith on December 15, 2018, at UFC on Fox 31. He won the fight by unanimous decision.

Cummings faced Trevin Giles on May 18, 2019, at UFC Fight Night 152. He won the fight via a guillotine choke submission in the third round.

Cummings faced Omari Akhmedov on September 7, 2019, at UFC 242. He lost the fight by unanimous decision.

Cummings was scheduled to face Andrew Sanchez on April 25, 2020. However, on April 9, Dana White, the president of UFC announced that this event was postponed to a future date

Cummings faced Alessio Di Chirico on August 29, 2020, at UFC Fight Night 175. He won the fight by unanimous decision.

Cummings was scheduled to face Sam Alvey on April 10, 2021, at UFC on ABC 2. However on March 11, Cummings withdrew from the bout for undisclosed reasons and was replaced by Julian Marquez.

It was later revealed that Cummings had suffered a serious back injury in camp for his last bout, resulting in him needing back surgery for herniated disc.

Cummings faced Ed Herman on April 15, 2023, at UFC on ESPN 44. He won the fight via TKO in the third round. In his post-fight speech, Cummings announced his retirement from mixed martial arts competition alongside Herman.

== Personal life ==
Cummings is the owner of Ignite Jiu Jitsu & MMA in Kansas City, where he also serves as a head coach.

Cummings has a daughter, Kyleigh (born 2017).

== Championships and accomplishments ==
- Ultimate Fighting Championship
  - Submission of the Night (One time) vs. Ben Alloway
  - UFC.com Awards
    - 2014: Ranked #8 Upset of the Year vs. Yan Cabral
- Midwest Cage Championships
  - MCC Middleweight Championship (One time)

== Mixed martial arts record ==
Professional record breakdown
32 matches	25 wins	7 losses
By knockout	6	0
By submission	12	2
By decision	7	5

Res.	Record	Opponent	Method	Event	Date	Round	Time	Location	Notes
Win	25–7	Ed Herman	TKO (punches)	UFC on ESPN: Holloway vs. Allen	April 15, 2023	3	4:13	Kansas City, Missouri, United States	Light Heavyweight bout. Herman was deducted 1 point in round 2 due to an illegal upkick.
Win	24–7	Alessio Di Chirico	Decision (unanimous)	UFC Fight Night: Smith vs. Rakić	August 29, 2020	3	5:00	Las Vegas, Nevada, United States	
Loss	23–7	Omari Akhmedov	Decision (unanimous)	UFC 242	September 7, 2019	3	5:00	Abu Dhabi, United Arab Emirates	
Win	23–6	Trevin Giles	Submission (guillotine choke)	UFC Fight Night: dos Anjos vs. Lee	May 18, 2019	3	4:01	Rochester, New York, United States	
Win	22–6	Trevor Smith	Decision (unanimous)	UFC on Fox: Lee vs. Iaquinta 2	December 15, 2018	3	5:00	Milwaukee, Wisconsin, United States	Return to Middleweight.
Loss	21–6	Michel Prazeres	Decision (split)	UFC Fight Night: Maia vs. Usman	May 19, 2018	3	5:00	Santiago, Chile	
Win	21–5	Nathan Coy	Technical Submission (guillotine choke)	UFC on Fox: Johnson vs. Reis	April 15, 2017	1	4:21	Kansas City, Missouri, United States	
Win	20–5	Alexander Yakovlev	Submission (straight armbar)	UFC Fight Night: Mousasi vs. Hall 2	November 19, 2016	2	4:02	Belfast, Northern Ireland	Catchweight (172.8 lb) bout; Cummings missed weight.
Loss	19–5	Santiago Ponzinibbio	Decision (unanimous)	UFC Fight Night: Rodríguez vs. Caceres	August 6, 2016	3	5:00	Salt Lake City, Utah, United States	
Win	19–4	Nicolas Dalby	Decision (unanimous)	UFC Fight Night: Rothwell vs. dos Santos	April 10, 2016	3	5:00	Zagreb, Croatia	
Win	18–4	Dominique Steele	TKO (punches)	UFC on Fox: Dillashaw vs. Barão 2	July 25, 2015	1	0:43	Chicago, Illinois, United States	
Loss	17–4	Gunnar Nelson	Submission (rear-naked choke)	UFC Fight Night: McGregor vs. Brandao	July 19, 2014	2	4:48	Dublin, Ireland	
Win	17–3	Yan Cabral	Decision (unanimous)	UFC Fight Night: Brown vs. Silva	May 10, 2014	3	5:00	Cincinnati, Ohio, United States	
Win	16–3	Ben Alloway	Submission (D'Arce choke)	UFC Fight Night: Condit vs. Kampmann 2	August 28, 2013	1	4:19	Indianapolis, Indiana, United States	Welterweight debut. Submission of the Night.
Win	15–3	Brandon Newsome	Submission (guillotine choke)	Slay Marketing: Fight Night Returns	March 24, 2012	1	2:38	Springfield, Missouri, United States	
Win	14–3	Lamont Stafford	Submission (rear-naked choke)	Slay Marketing	February 11, 2012	1	1:46	O'Reilly Family Event Center, Springfield, Missouri, United States	
Loss	13–3	Ryan Jimmo	Decision (unanimous)	MFC 29: Conquer	April 8, 2011	5	5:00	Windsor, Ontario, Canada	For the MFC Light Heavyweight Championship.
Win	13–2	Jonathan Smith	TKO (punches)	SMMA: The Proving Ground	February 19, 2011	1	0:50	Springfield, Missouri, United States	
Win	12–2	Dennis Reed	Submission (armbar)	XCF 13: Cummings vs. Reed	September 18, 2010	1	0:58	Springfield, Missouri, United States	
Win	11–2	Rudy Bears	Submission (D'Arce choke)	Bellator 26	August 26, 2010	1	1:27	Kansas City, Missouri, United States	
Loss	10–2	Elvis Mutapčić	Decision (unanimous)	Midwest Cage Championships 27	June 11, 2010	5	5:00	Des Moines, Iowa, United States	For the MCC Middleweight Championship.
Loss	10–1	Tim Kennedy	Submission (north-south choke)	Strikeforce Challengers: Kennedy vs. Cummings	September 25, 2009	2	2:43	Tulsa, Oklahoma, United States	
Win	10–0	Dominic Brown	TKO (punches)	FM: Productions	May 9, 2009	1	2:19	Springfield, Missouri, United States	
Win	9–0	Terry Martin	Decision (split)	XCF: Rumble in Racetown 1	February 14, 2009	3	5:00	Daytona Beach, Florida, United States	
Win	8–0	Cole Jennet	Submission (neck crank)	MCC 17: Thanksgiving Throwdown	November 26, 2008	1	2:11	West Des Moines, Iowa, United States	Won the MCC Middleweight Championship.
Win	7–0	Leo Pla	TKO (punches)	FM: Productions	September 13, 2008	2	3:48	Springfield, Missouri, United States	
Win	6–0	Danny Anderson	Decision (unanimous)	MCC 15: Lights Out!	July 25, 2008	3	5:00	Des Moines, Iowa, United States	
Win	5–0	Jason Broom	TKO (punches)	ISCF: Brawl at the Hall	May 9, 2008	2	2:21	Joplin, Missouri, United States	
Win	4–0	Victor Moreno	Submission (americana)	MCC 13: Contenders	April 25, 2008	2	2:19	Urbandale, Iowa, United States	
Win	3–0	James Bunch	Submission (choke)	FM: Productions	April 18, 2008	2	1:34	Rolla, Missouri, United States	
Win	2–0	Rudy Bears	Submission (choke)	FM: Productions	February 1, 2008	3	2:08	Rolla, Missouri, United States	
Win	1–0	Ron Jackson	Decision (unanimous)	Titan FC 10	November 28, 2007	3	N/A	Kansas City, Kansas, United States	

=== Mixed martial arts exhibition record ===
Exhibition record breakdown		
2 matches	1 win	1 loss
By knockout	1	0
By decision	0	1

Res.	Record	Opponent	Method	Event	Date	Round	Time	Location	Notes
Loss	1–1	Dylan Andrews	Decision (majority)	The Ultimate Fighter: Team Jones vs. Team Sonnen	March 12, 2013 (airdate)	2	5:00	Las Vegas, Nevada, United States	Preliminary bout.
Win	1–0	Nik Fekete	KO (punches)	The Ultimate Fighter: Team Jones vs. Team Sonnen	January 22, 2013 (airdate)	1	N/A	Las Vegas, Nevada, United States	TUF 17 house entry bout.

== See also ==
- List of male mixed martial artists
