= Ryan LaFlare =

American mixed martial arts fighter (born 1983)

- Born: October 1, 1983 (age 43); Lindenhurst, New York, U.S.
- Height: 6 ft 1 in (1.85 m)
- Weight: 170 lb (77 kg; 12 st)
- Division: Welterweight
- Reach: 74 in (188 cm)
- Fighting out of: Farmingdale, New York
- Team: Long Island MMA; Bellmore Kickboxing
- Rank: Purple belt in Brazilian Jiu-Jitsu
- Years active: 2008- 2018

Mixed martial arts record
- Total: 17
- Wins: 14
- By knockout: 4
- By submission: 3
- By decision: 7
- Losses: 3
- By knockout: 2
- By decision: 1

Other information
- Mixed martial arts record from Sherdog

Ryan LaFlare (born October 1, 1983) is an American retired mixed martial artist who formerly competed in the UFC's Welterweight division.

== Background ==
LaFlare was born and raised in Lindenhurst, New York, attending Lindenhurst High School where he was a League I runner-up, and placed 6th at the Suffolk County/Section XI Championships in wrestling. LaFlare then continued his career at Nassau Community College, but shifted his attention to lacrosse after a snowboarding accident. He later transferred to Farmingdale State College where he became the school's all-time leading goal scorer and was also an honorable mention All-American. LaFlare began practicing Brazilian jiu-jitsu upon graduation, before transitioning into mixed martial arts. He also previously worked for the MMA stats website Compustrike, which he claims gave him a better understanding of the sport.

== Mixed martial arts career ==
=== Early career ===
LaFlare compiled an undefeated 6–0 record with all finishes with all of his bouts taking place in the New Jersey–based promotion Ring of Combat. There was a 2.5 year gap between his last two wins due to a plethora of injuries and the successful return got him a call up to Strikeforce. However the organization would be absorbed by the UFC shortly after signing him and he would never compete. Believing that he was free to sign elsewhere he signed with World Series of Fighting at was tentatively booked to face Josh Burkman at WSOF 2. However two weeks after the bout was announced LaFlare was called by the UFC and informed that he was under contract with them due to his previous Strikeforce contract being absorbed.

=== Ultimate Fighting Championship ===
LaFlare made his promotional debut on April 6, 2013, at UFC on Fuel TV 9 against Ben Alloway. He won the fight via unanimous decision.

LaFlare faced promotional newcomer Santiago Ponzinibbio on November 9, 2013, at UFC Fight Night 32. He won the fight via unanimous decision.

LaFlare faced Court McGee on December 14, 2013, at UFC on Fox 9, replacing an injured Kelvin Gastelum. He won the fight via unanimous decision.

LaFlare faced John Howard at UFC Fight Night 39. He won the fight by unanimous decision.

LaFlare was expected to face Gunnar Nelson on July 19, 2014, at UFC Fight Night 46. However, he was sidelined due to injury and replaced by Zak Cummings.

LaFlare faced Demian Maia at UFC Fight Night 62 on March 21, 2015. LaFlare lost the fight by unanimous decision.

LaFlare faced Mike Pierce on December 11, 2015, at The Ultimate Fighter 22 Finale. He won the fight by unanimous decision.

LaFlare was scheduled to face Alexander Yakovlev on July 23, 2016, at UFC on Fox 20. However, LaFlare pulled out of the fight in early June after sustaining an undisclosed injury and replaced by Kamaru Usman.

LaFlare faced Roan Carneiro on February 11, 2017, at UFC 208. He won the fight by unanimous decision.

LaFlare faced Alex Oliveira on July 22, 2017, at UFC on Fox 25. After winning the first round with his wrestling, he lost the fight via knockout in the second round, marking the first time he's been stopped in his MMA career.

LaFlare faced Alex Garcia on April 21, 2018, at UFC Fight Night 128. He won the fight via unanimous decision.

LaFlare faced Anthony Rocco Martin on October 6, 2018, at UFC 229. He lost the fight via knockout in the third round after being dropped by a head kick and finished with punches.

On October 10, 2018, LaFlare announced his retirement from professional MMA competition.

== Championships and accomplishments ==
- Ultimate Fighting Championship
  - UFC.com Awards
    - 2013: Ranked #4 Newcomer of the Year
- Fight Matrix
  - 2013 Comeback Fighter of the Year

== Mixed martial arts record ==
Professional record breakdown
| 17 matches | 14 wins | 3 losses |
| By knockout | 4 | 2 |
| By submission | 3 | 0 |
| By decision | 7 | 1 |

| Res. | Record | Opponent | Method | Event | Date | Round | Time | Location | Notes |
|---|---|---|---|---|---|---|---|---|---|
| Loss | 14–3 | Anthony Rocco Martin | KO (head kick and punches) | UFC 229 | October 6, 2018 | 3 | 1:00 | Las Vegas, Nevada, United States | |
| Win | 14–2 | Alex Garcia | Decision (unanimous) | UFC Fight Night: Barboza vs. Lee | April 21, 2018 | 3 | 5:00 | Atlantic City, New Jersey, United States | |
| Loss | 13–2 | Alex Oliveira | KO (punch) | UFC on Fox: Weidman vs. Gastelum | July 22, 2017 | 2 | 1:50 | Uniondale, New York, United States | |
| Win | 13–1 | Roan Carneiro | Decision (unanimous) | UFC 208 | February 11, 2017 | 3 | 5:00 | Brooklyn, New York, United States | |
| Win | 12–1 | Mike Pierce | Decision (unanimous) | The Ultimate Fighter: Team McGregor vs. Team Faber Finale | December 11, 2015 | 3 | 5:00 | Las Vegas, Nevada, United States | |
| Loss | 11–1 | Demian Maia | Decision (unanimous) | UFC Fight Night: Maia vs. LaFlare | March 21, 2015 | 5 | 5:00 | Rio de Janeiro, Brazil | Maia was deducted one point in round 5 due to timidity. |
| Win | 11–0 | John Howard | Decision (unanimous) | UFC Fight Night: Nogueira vs. Nelson | April 11, 2014 | 3 | 5:00 | Abu Dhabi, United Arab Emirates | |
| Win | 10–0 | Court McGee | Decision (unanimous) | UFC on Fox: Johnson vs. Benavidez 2 | December 14, 2013 | 3 | 5:00 | Sacramento, California, United States | |
| Win | 9–0 | Santiago Ponzinibbio | Decision (unanimous) | UFC Fight Night: Belfort vs. Henderson | November 9, 2013 | 3 | 5:00 | Goiânia, Brazil | |
| Win | 8–0 | Ben Alloway | Decision (unanimous) | UFC on Fuel TV: Mousasi vs. Latifi | April 6, 2013 | 3 | 5:00 | Stockholm, Sweden | |
| Win | 7–0 | Andrew Osborne | Submission (armbar) | Ring of Combat 43 | January 25, 2013 | 3 | 2:01 | Atlantic City, New Jersey, United States | Defended the ROC Welterweight Championship. |
| Win | 6–0 | Mike Medrano | TKO (knee to the body and punches) | Ring of Combat 30 | June 11, 2010 | 1 | 4:07 | Atlantic City, New Jersey, United States | Defended the ROC Welterweight Championship. |
| Win | 5–0 | Justin Haskins | KO (punches) | Ring of Combat 28 | February 19, 2010 | 2 | 1:36 | Atlantic City, New Jersey, United States | Won the ROC Welterweight Championship. |
| Win | 4–0 | Mark Berrocal | TKO (punches) | Ring of Combat 27 | November 20, 2009 | 1 | 3:19 | Atlantic City, New Jersey, United States | |
| Win | 3–0 | Jose Sulsona | Submission (armbar) | Ring of Combat 26 | September 11, 2009 | 2 | 2:18 | Atlantic City, New Jersey, United States | Welterweight debut. |
| Win | 2–0 | Robert Cunane | KO (punch) | Ring of Combat 25 | June 12, 2009 | 1 | 1:19 | Atlantic City, New Jersey, United States | Catchweight (176 lbs) bout. |
| Win | 1–0 | Radji Bryson-Barrett | Submission (armbar) | Ring of Combat 20 | June 27, 2008 | 1 | 2:38 | Atlantic City, New Jersey, United States | Catchweight (175 lbs) bout. |

== See also ==
- List of current UFC fighters
- List of male mixed martial artists
