= UFC on Fox: Holm vs. Shevchenko =

UFC mixed martial arts event in 2016

- The poster for UFC on Fox: Holm vs. Shevchenko
- Promotion: Ultimate Fighting Championship
- Date: July 23, 2016
- Venue: United Center
- City: Chicago, Illinois
- Attendance: 10,287
- Total gate: $1,000,000

Event chronology
UFC Fight Night: McDonald vs. Lineker	UFC on Fox: Holm vs. Shevchenko	UFC 201: Lawler vs. Woodley

UFC on Fox: Holm vs. Shevchenko (also known as UFC on Fox 20) was a mixed martial arts event produced by the Ultimate Fighting Championship held on July 23, 2016, at United Center in Chicago, Illinois.

== Background ==
The event was headlined by a women's bantamweight bout between former UFC Women's Bantamweight Champion Holly Holm and multiple-time Muay Thai world champion Valentina Shevchenko.

A bout between former UFC Light Heavyweight Championship challengers Anthony Johnson and Glover Teixeira was expected to serve as the co-main event. However, Johnson pulled out on June 18 to tend to personal issues. In turn, promotion officials elected to pull Teixeira from the card and the pairing was left intact and rescheduled to take place four weeks later at UFC 202.

Ryan LaFlare was expected to face Alexander Yakovlev at the event. However, LaFlare was removed from the fight in early June after sustaining an undisclosed injury and was replaced by The Ultimate Fighter: American Top Team vs. Blackzilians winner Kamaru Usman.

Anthony Rocco Martin was expected to face Michel Prazeres at the event. However, Martin pulled out on July 6 due to a neck injury and was replaced by promotional newcomer J.C. Cottrell.

George Sullivan was expected to face Héctor Urbina, but was pulled from the event due to a "potential compliance issue" with the UFC's anti-doping policy stemming from "voluntarily disclosed information" he provided to USADA. Urbina still weighed in as a potential backup opponent should there be a need for him to compete in another bout. Since that did not materialize, he will be re-booked for another card in the near future.

== Results ==
Main Card (Fox)
Weight class				Method	Round	Time	Notes
Women's Bantamweight	Valentina Shevchenko	def.	Holly Holm	Decision (unanimous) (49–46, 49–46, 49–46)	5	5:00
Lightweight	Edson Barboza	def.	Gilbert Melendez	Decision (unanimous) (30–27, 30–27, 29–28)	3	5:00
Heavyweight	Francis Ngannou	def.	Bojan Mihajlović	TKO (punches)	1	1:34
Women's Strawweight	Felice Herrig	def.	Kailin Curran	Submission (rear-naked choke)	1	1:59
Preliminary Card (Fox)
Bantamweight	Eddie Wineland	def.	Frankie Saenz	TKO (punches)	3	1:54
Featherweight	Darren Elkins	def.	Godofredo Pepey	Decision (unanimous) (29–27, 29–27, 30–26)	3	5:00	(Note: Pepey was deducted 1 point in round 2 due to an illegal knee.)
Welterweight	Kamaru Usman	def.	Alexander Yakovlev	Decision (unanimous) (30–25, 30–25, 30–25)	3	5:00	(Note: Yakovlev was deducted 1 point in round 1 due to grabbing the cage.)
Lightweight	Michel Prazeres	def.	J.C. Cottrell	Decision (unanimous) (30–26, 30–27, 30–27)	3	5:00
Preliminary Card (UFC Fight Pass)
Welterweight	Alex Oliveira	def.	James Moontasri	Decision (unanimous) (30–26, 30–26, 30–25)	3	5:00
Featherweight	Jason Knight	def.	Jim Alers	Decision (split) (29–28, 28–29, 29–28)	3	5:00
Heavyweight	Luis Henrique	def.	Dmitry Smolyakov	Submission (rear-naked choke)	2	3:58

== Bonus awards ==
The following fighters were awarded $50,000 bonuses:

- Fight of the Night: Jason Knight vs. Jim Alers
- Performance of the Night: Felice Herrig and Eddie Wineland

== See also ==
- List of UFC events
- 2016 in UFC
