= 2004 in M-1 Global =

Mixed martial arts events

Information
- First date: February 21, 2004
- Last date: December 4, 2004

Events
- Total events: 7

Fights
- Total fights: 67

Chronology
2003 in M-1	2004 in M-1 Global	2005 in M-1

The year 2004 is the eighth year in the history of M-1 Global, a mixed martial arts promotion based in Russia. In 2004 M-1 Global held 7 events beginning with, M-1 MFC: Mix-fight.

== Events list ==
#	Event title	Date	Arena	Location
28	M-1 Heavyweight Grand Prix	December 4, 2004	Lujniki Sports Complex	Moscow, Russia
27	M-1 Heavyweight Russia Cup	November 6, 2004	Conti Casino Giant Hall	Saint Petersburg, Russia
26	M-1 Middleweight Grand Prix	October 9, 2004		Saint Petersburg, Russia
25	M-1 Middleweight Russia Cup	August 27, 2004	Conti Casino Giant Hall	Saint Petersburg, Russia
24	M-1 International Fight Night 2	May 21, 2004		Saint Petersburg, Russia
23	M-1 International Fight Night 1	April 10, 2004	Conti Casino Giant Hall	Saint Petersburg, Russia
22	M-1 Northwest Open Cup	February 21, 2004	Conti Casino Giant Hall	Saint Petersburg, Russia

== M-1 Northwest Open Cup ==
M-1 Northwest Open Cup was an event held on February 21, 2004 in Russia.

=== Results ===
Main Card
Weight class				Method	Round	Time	Notes
	Alexander Yakovlev	def.	Vladimir Magomedshayshafiev	TKO (Punches)	1	0:00

== M-1 International Fight Night 1 ==
M-1 International Fight Night 1 was an event held on April 10, 2004 in Saint Petersburg, Russia.

=== Results ===
Main Card
Weight class				Method	Round	Time	Notes
	Milco Voorn	def.	Maxim Novoselov	N/A	2	5:00
	Sergey Naumov	def.	Denis Komkin	N/A	0	0:00
	Andrei Sen	def.	Ramin Tagiev	N/A	0	0:00
	Karen Grigoryan	def.	Ardak Nazarov	N/A	0	0:00
	Nikolai Kudryashov	def.	Klimov Klimov	KO	1	0:17
	Baga Agaev	def.	Vitaly Ankipin	N/A	0	0:00
	Roman Galako	vs.	Parviza Mastabegova	Draw	0	0:00
	Igor Abaev	def.	Vladimir Kuchenko	N/A	0	0:00
	Alexander Yakovlev	def.	Vladimir Magomedshayshafiev	Submission (Rear-Naked Choke)	1	0:00

== M-1 International Fight Night 2 ==
International Fight Night 2 was an event held on May 21, 2004 in Saint Petersburg, Russia.

=== Results ===
Main Card
Weight class				Method	Round	Time	Notes
	Ramazan Akhadullaev	def.	Artem Matveyevskiy	Submission	0	0:00
	Sergey Naumov	def.	Sergey Grishina	Submission (Strikes)	1	0:00
	Parviza Mastabegova	def.	Svyatoslav Scherbakov	Decision	2	5:00
	Sergey Golyaev	def.	Dmitriy Megrobyan	Submission (Triangle Choke)	0	0:00
	Ramin Tagiev	def.	Anatoliy Baragunov	TKO (Cut)	1	0:00
	Ovagim Manusajan	def.	Vladimir Kuchenko	Submission (Armlock)	1	0:00
	Roman Galako	def.	Islam Radzhabov	Submission (Guillotine Choke)	1	0:00
	Magomed Tugayev	def.	Alexander Yakovlev	Submission (Armlock)	1	0:00
	Abdulmuslim Yakubov	vs.	Koba Kobaliya	Draw	2	5:00
	Ali Ezerbiyev	def.	Gocha Markoziya	Decision	2	5:00

== M-1 Middleweight Russia Cup ==
M-1 Middleweight Russia Cup was an event held on August 27, 2004 at Conti Hall in Saint Petersburg, Russia.

=== Results ===
Main Card
Weight class				Method	Round	Time	Notes
	Ramazan Akhadullaev	def.	Vasiliy Gorbonos	Submission (Armbar)	1	2:01
	Alexey Oleinik	def.	Azred Telkusheev	Submission (Heel Hook)	1	0:38
	Azred Telkusheev	def.	Sergey Naumov	Submission (Rear-Naked Choke)	1	2:08
	Alexey Oleinik	def.	Ubaidula Chopolaev	Submission (Rear-Naked Choke)	1	0:48
	Alexey Oleinik	def.	Ramin Tagiev	Submission (Rear-Naked Choke)	1	2:03
	Azred Telkusheev	def.	Denis Komkin	TKO (Punches)	1	1:10
	Ubaidula Chopolaev	def.	Ruslan Mamedov	TKO (Punches)	1	3:42
	Sergey Naumov	def.	Danila Veselov	Submission (Rear-Naked Choke)	1	3:44
	Said Khalilov	def.	Anatoliy Baragunov	TKO (Punches)	1	1:22

== M-1 Middleweight Grand Prix ==
M-1 Middleweight Grand Prix was an event held on October 9, 2004 in Saint Petersburg, Russia.

=== Results ===
Main Card
Weight class				Method	Round	Time	Notes
	Vladimir Yushko	def.	Ramin Tagiev	Submission (Armbar)	1	0:46
	Danila Veselov	def.	Roman Galako	Submission (Kneebar)	2	0:55
	Andrei Semenov	def.	Flavio Luiz Moura	Decision (Unanimous)	3	5:00
	Alexander Emelianenko	def.	Carlos Barreto	Decision (Unanimous)	3	5:00
	Ramazan Akhadullaev	def.	Peter Mulder	Submission (Punches)	1	0:48
	Arman Gambaryan	def.	Cyrille Diabate	Decision (Unanimous)	3	5:00
	Flavio Luiz Moura	def.	Alexey Oleinik	Technical Submission (Rear-Naked Choke)	1	1:11
	Andrei Semenov	def.	Azred Telkusheev	Submission (Rear-Naked Choke)	1	1:25
	Alexei Veselovzorov	def.	Michael Knaap	Submission (Rear-Naked Choke)	1	1:53
	Musail Alaudinov	def.	Petr Cajnak	Submission (Rear-Naked Choke)	1	0:47
	Alexey Oleinik	def.	Marcelo Alfaya	Decision (Unanimous)	2	5:00
	Azred Telkusheev	def.	Shonie Carter	Decision (Unanimous)	2	5:00
	Andrei Semenov	def.	Martin Kampmann	TKO (Doctor Stoppage)	1	1:21
	Flavio Luiz Moura	def.	Kazuki Okubo	Submission (Guillotine Choke)	1	1:08
	Murat Musavuzov	def.	Ubaidula Chopolaev	Submission (Armbar)	1	1:05

== M-1 Heavyweight Russia Cup ==
M-1 Heavyweight Russia Cup was an event held on November 6, 2004 at Gigant Hall in Saint Petersburg, Russia.

=== Results ===
Main Card
Weight class				Method	Round	Time	Notes
	Ramazan Akhadullaev	def.	Baga Agaev	Submission (Rear-Naked Choke)	1	4:57
	Ramazan Akhadullaev	def.	Roman Savochka	TKO (Punches)	1	4:41
	Baga Agaev	def.	Pavel Ponomarenko	Submission (Rear-Naked Choke)	1	0:39
	Baga Agaev	def.	Denis Bogdanov	Submission (Armbar)	1	0:55
	Roman Savochka	def.	Alexandr Garkushenko	Submission (Heel Hook)	1	4:57
	Ramazan Akhadullaev	def.	Vladimir Kuchenko	Submission (Rear-Naked Choke)	1	0:35
	Pavel Ponomarenko	def.	Vadim Fadeev	Submission (Rear-Naked Choke)	1	2:16
	Said Khalilov	def.	Rustam Akhmarov	TKO (Corner Stoppage)	1	5:00
	Karen Grigoryan	def.	Gela Beridze	Submission (Armbar)	1	2:30

== M-1 Heavyweight Grand Prix ==
M-1 Heavyweight Grand Prix was an event held on December 4, 2004 at the Lujniki Sports Complex in Moscow, Russia.

=== Results ===
Main Card
Weight class				Method	Round	Time	Notes
	Andrei Semenov	def.	Matt Ewin	Decision (Unanimous)	3	5:00
	Keith Jardine	def.	Arman Gambaryan	Submission (Armbar)	1	2:37
	Denis Kang	def.	Alexei Veselovzorov	Submission (Anaconda Choke)	1	1:17
	Jason Jones	def.	Sergey Naumov	KO (Knee)	2	4:32
	Ibragim Magomedov	def.	Martin Malkhasyan	Decision (Unanimous)	3	5:00
	Ibragim Magomedov	def.	Milco Voorn	Decision (Unanimous)	2	5:00
	Martin Malkhasyan	def.	Ramazan Akhadullaev	Submission (Rear-Naked Choke)	1	4:45
	Ibragim Magomedov	def.	Carlos Clayton	Decision (Unanimous)	2	5:00
	Milco Voorn	def.	Ulysses Castro	TKO (Corner Stoppage)	1	5:00
	Ramazan Akhadullaev	def.	Rodney Glunder	Decision (Split)	2	5:00
	Martin Malkhasyan	def.	Carlos Barreto	Decision (Unanimous)	2	5:00
	Roman Savochka	def.	Baga Agaev	Submission (Achilles Lock)	1	2:06
	Besiki Gerenava	def.	Ruslan Gasanov	KO (Punch)	1	0:31
	Sergey Golyaev	def.	Said Khalilov	Submission (Triangle Choke)	1	1:14

== See also ==
- M-1 Global
