= Yakovlev (disambiguation) =

Yakovlev is a Russian aircraft designer and manufacturer.

Yakovlev may also refer to:

- Yakovlev (surname), a Russian surname
- Mount Yakovlev, a mountain in the Russkiye Mountains, Queen Maud Land, Antarctica
