= Anthony Rocco Martin =

American mixed martial artist

- Born: December 11, 1989 (age 36); Palos Heights, Illinois, U.S.
- Other names: Tony Martin
- Height: 6 ft 0 in (1.83 m)
- Weight: 170 lb (77 kg; 12 st)
- Division: Middleweight; Welterweight; Lightweight
- Reach: 73 1/2 in (187 cm)
- Stance: Orthodox
- Fighting out of: Saint Paul, Minnesota, United States
- Team: American Top Team; Team Lloyd Irvin; Performance Compound
- Rank: Black belt in Brazilian Jiu-Jitsu
- Years active: 2012–present (MMA)

Mixed martial arts record
- Total: 24
- Wins: 18
- By knockout: 1
- By submission: 10
- By decision: 7
- Losses: 6
- By submission: 2
- By decision: 4

Other information
- Mixed martial arts record from Sherdog

Anthony Rocco Martin (born December 11, 1989) is an American professional mixed martial artist who competed in the lightweight and welterweight divisions of the Ultimate Fighting Championship.

== Background ==
Born in Palos Heights, Illinois, Martin moved to Worth, Illinois, before settling in Wisconsin during his junior high school years. After graduating high school, where he played football, Martin attended college and briefly played football at North Dakota State University before dropping out. After dropping out Martin began training in Brazilian jiu-jitsu and mixed martial arts.

== Mixed martial arts career ==
Martin made his professional mixed martial arts debut on January 7, 2012, when he faced Bruce Johnson at Cage Fighting Xtreme 30. He won the fight via first round rear-naked choke. Following the quick win, he compiled a record of 8–0, including a notable win over UFC veteran Phillipe Nover at Dakota FC 14, before being signed by the Ultimate Fighting Championship in late 2013.

=== Ultimate Fighting Championship ===
In his official UFC debut, Martin faced fellow newcomer Rashid Magomedov at UFC 169 on February 1, 2014. Though he had Magomedov in trouble early with a deep armbar, Magomedov rallied back and Martin lost the fight via unanimous decision.

Martin then faced Beneil Dariush at UFC Fight Night: Henderson vs. dos Anjos on August 23, 2014. Martin lost the fight via rear-naked choke in the second round.

For his third fight with the promotion, he faced Fabrício Camões in a catchweight bout (both fighters missed weight) at UFC 179 on October 25, 2014. He won the fight via first round kimura lock, getting his first UFC win in the process.

Martin next faced Leonardo Santos on March 21, 2015, at UFC Fight Night 62, as a replacement for an injured Matt Wiman. He lost the fight via submission in the second round.

Martin faced promotional newcomer Felipe Olivieri on January 30, 2016, at UFC on Fox 18. Martin earned a come from behind victory as he submitted Oilveiri in the third round.

Martin was expected to face Michel Prazeres on July 23, 2016, at UFC on Fox 20. However, Martin pulled out of the fight in early July citing a neck injury and was replaced by promotional newcomer J.C. Cottrell.

Martin was expected to face Erik Koch on January 15, 2017, at UFC Fight Night 103. However, Koch pulled out of the fight on December 12 citing an injury and was replaced by Alex White. He won the fight via unanimous decision.

Martin faced Johnny Case on June 25, 2017, at UFC Fight Night 112. He won the fight via unanimous decision.

Martin faced Olivier Aubin-Mercier on September 16, 2017, at UFC Fight Night 116. He lost the back-and-forth fight via split decision.

Martin faced Keita Nakamura in a welterweight bout on April 21, 2018, at UFC Fight Night 128. He won the fight via unanimous decision.

Martin faced Ryan LaFlare on October 6, 2018, at UFC 229. He won the fight via knockout in the third round after dropping LaFlare with a head kick and following up with punches. This victory marked Martin's first professional victory by way of knockout.

Martin faced Jake Matthews on December 2, 2018, at UFC Fight Night 142. He won the fight via an anaconda choke in round three.

Martin faced Sérgio Moraes on March 9, 2019, at UFC Fight Night 146. He won the fight by unanimous decision.

Martin faced Demian Maia on June 29, 2019, at UFC on ESPN: Ngannou vs. dos Santos. He lost the fight via majority decision.

Martin faced Ramazan Emeev on November 9, 2019, at UFC on ESPN+ 21. He won the fight via unanimous decision.

Martin was scheduled to face David Zawada on April 25, 2020. However, on April 9 the promotion indicated that the pairing had been scrapped as a result of the COVID-19 pandemic.

As the last fight of his prevailing contract, Martin faced Neil Magny on June 6, 2020, at UFC 250. He lost the bout via unanimous decision.

Martin and the UFC parted ways after the completion of his most recent contract allowing him to negotiate with other promotions.

=== CES ===
Martin made his first appearance since leaving the UFC headlining against Tim Bazer at CES 68 on May 6, 2022. He won the bout via brabo choke in the second round.

== Legal incidents ==
Martin was arrested on November 23, 2021, for one count each of battery and lewd/dissolute conduct in a public place in Las Vegas for allegedly urinating in a hallway at Caesars Palace and punching a security officer in the throat after he was confronted. Martin was released later and is expected to appear in Las Vegas Justice Court on January 19, 2022

== Mixed martial arts record ==
Professional record breakdown
| 24 matches | 18 wins | 6 losses |
| By knockout | 1 | 0 |
| By submission | 10 | 2 |
| By decision | 7 | 4 |

| Res. | Record | Opponent | Method | Event | Date | Round | Time | Location | Notes |
|---|---|---|---|---|---|---|---|---|---|
| Win | 18–6 | Tim Bazer | Submission (brabo choke) | CES 68 | May 6, 2022 | 2 | 1:05 | West Fargo, North Dakota, United States | Middleweight debut. |
| Loss | 17–6 | Neil Magny | Decision (unanimous) | UFC 250 | June 6, 2020 | 3 | 5:00 | Las Vegas, Nevada, United States | |
| Win | 17–5 | Ramazan Emeev | Decision (unanimous) | UFC Fight Night: Magomedsharipov vs. Kattar | November 9, 2019 | 3 | 5:00 | Moscow, Russia | |
| Loss | 16–5 | Demian Maia | Decision (majority) | UFC on ESPN: Ngannou vs. dos Santos | June 29, 2019 | 3 | 5:00 | Minneapolis, Minnesota, United States | |
| Win | 16–4 | Sérgio Moraes | Decision (unanimous) | UFC Fight Night: Lewis vs. dos Santos | March 9, 2019 | 3 | 5:00 | Wichita, Kansas, United States | |
| Win | 15–4 | Jake Matthews | Technical Submission (anaconda choke) | UFC Fight Night: dos Santos vs. Tuivasa | December 2, 2018 | 3 | 1:19 | Adelaide, Australia | |
| Win | 14–4 | Ryan LaFlare | KO (head kick and punches) | UFC 229 | October 6, 2018 | 3 | 1:00 | Las Vegas, Nevada, United States | |
| Win | 13–4 | Keita Nakamura | Decision (unanimous) | UFC Fight Night: Barboza vs. Lee | April 21, 2018 | 3 | 5:00 | Atlantic City, New Jersey, United States | Return to Welterweight. |
| Loss | 12–4 | Olivier Aubin-Mercier | Decision (split) | UFC Fight Night: Rockhold vs. Branch | September 16, 2017 | 3 | 5:00 | Pittsburgh, Pennsylvania, United States | |
| Win | 12–3 | Johnny Case | Decision (unanimous) | UFC Fight Night: Chiesa vs. Lee | June 25, 2017 | 3 | 5:00 | Oklahoma City, Oklahoma, United States | |
| Win | 11–3 | Alex White | Decision (unanimous) | UFC Fight Night: Rodríguez vs. Penn | January 15, 2017 | 3 | 5:00 | Phoenix, Arizona, United States | |
| Win | 10–3 | Felipe Olivieri | Technical Submission (rear-naked choke) | UFC on Fox: Johnson vs. Bader | January 30, 2016 | 3 | 3:02 | Newark, New Jersey, United States | |
| Loss | 9–3 | Leonardo Santos | Submission (rear-naked choke) | UFC Fight Night: Maia vs. LaFlare | March 21, 2015 | 2 | 2:29 | Rio de Janeiro, Brazil | |
| Win | 9–2 | Fabrício Camões | Submission (kimura) | UFC 179 | October 25, 2014 | 1 | 4:16 | Rio de Janeiro, Brazil | Catchweight (158 lbs) bout; both fighters missed weight. |
| Loss | 8–2 | Beneil Dariush | Submission (arm-triangle choke) | UFC Fight Night: Henderson vs. dos Anjos | August 23, 2014 | 2 | 3:38 | Tulsa, Oklahoma, United States | |
| Loss | 8–1 | Rashid Magomedov | Decision (unanimous) | UFC 169 | February 1, 2014 | 3 | 5:00 | Newark, New Jersey, United States | |
| Win | 8–0 | Thomas Gifford | Submission (americana) | 3 River Throwndown 4 | September 14, 2013 | 3 | 5:00 | La Crescent, Minnesota, United States | |
| Win | 7–0 | Tyler Hellenbrand | Decision (unanimous) | Dakota FC 15 | April 20, 2013 | 3 | 5:00 | Fargo, North Dakota, United States | |
| Win | 6–0 | Phillipe Nover | Decision (majority) | Dakota FC 14 | January 26, 2013 | 3 | 5:00 | Fargo, North Dakota, United States | Lightweight debut. |
| Win | 5–0 | Ted Worthington | Submission (kimura) | CFX: Cage Fighting Xtreme | December 16, 2012 | 1 | 3:58 | Maplewood, Minnesota, United States | Catchweight (165 lb) bout. |
| Win | 4–0 | Jay Ellis | Submission (guillotine choke) | Cage Fighting Xtreme 39 | October 20, 2012 | 1 | 0:51 | Maplewood, Minnesota, United States | |
| Win | 3–0 | Jonathan Knutson | Submission (kimura) | Throwdown at the Crowne 1 | September 8, 2012 | 3 | 2:10 | St. Paul, Minnesota, United States | |
| Win | 2–0 | Kuchlong Kuchlong | Submission (inverted triangle choke) | Cage Fighting Xtreme 33 | April 28, 2012 | 1 | 4:19 | Minneapolis, Minnesota, United States | |
| Win | 1–0 | Bruce Johnson | Submission (rear-naked choke) | Cage Fighting Xtreme 30 | January 7, 2012 | 1 | 2:15 | St. Cloud, Minnesota, United States | Welterweight debut. |

== See also ==
- List of male mixed martial artists
