= Yuriy Yakovlev =

Yuriy, Yuri, or Yury Yakovlev may refer to:

- Yury Yakovlev (1928–2013), Soviet film and theatre actor
- Yuriy Yakovlev (Bulgarian actor) (1930–2002), Bulgarian stage and film actor
- Yuri Yakovlev (ice hockey) (born 1957), Russian ice-hockey team president
- Yuri Yakovlev (military officer), Russian intelligence officer
- Yuri Yakovlev (writer), screenwriter of the 1969 film Umka
- Yuri Yakovlev (aircraft designer) (born 1961), Ukrainian aircraft designer, founder of Aeroprakt company

== See also ==
- Yakovlev (surname)
