= Aleksandr Yakovlev (jurist) =

- Александр Яковлев

Plenipotentiary Representative to the Federal Assembly
- In office 18 February 1994 – 5 February 1996

Personal details
- Born: Aleksandr Maksimovich Yakovlev; 29 August 1927 Leningrad, Soviet Union
- Died: 26 May 2011 (aged 83) Moscow, Russia
- Education: Moscow Law Institute

Aleksandr Maksimovich Yakovlev (Russian: Александр Максимович Яковлев; 29 August 1927 - 26 May 2011), was a Russian politician and jurist who had served as the Plenipotentiary Representative of the President of Russia to the Federal Assembly from 1994 to 1996.

Yakovlev was a Doctor of Law, Professor, a 1984 laureate of the State Prize of the USSR, and an Honoured Lawyer of Russia. He was also a People's Deputy of the USSR. He was one of the authors of the Constitution of Russia.

== Biography ==
Aleksandr Yakovlev was born in Leningrad on 29 August 1927. In 1952, Yakovlev graduated with honours from the Moscow Law Institute. He worked as head of the sector of criminal law and criminology of the Institute of State and Law of the USSR Academy of Sciences, and was the deputy director of the Institute of Soviet Legislation of the Soviet Ministry of Justice until 1975.

In 1989, Yakovlev was elected a People's Deputy of the USSR, and was a member of the Committee on Legislation, Law and Order of the Supreme Soviet of the Soviet Union.

In 1993, Yakovlev was the coordinator of a group of representatives of federal government bodies of the Constitutional Conference of Russia, which finalized the "presidential" draft of the Constitution of Russia. On 18 February 1994, Yakovlev became the Plenipotentiary Representative of the President of Russia to the Federal Assembly. That same year, he had been a member of the UN Committee to Combat Torture. On 5 February 1996, he was relieved of his duties as the plenipotentiary representative. On 10 February, the office of the plenipotentiary representative in the Federal Assembly was abolished. That same year, he was elected rector of the Moscow New Law Institute. He was the chief researcher of the sector of criminal law and criminology of the Center for Theoretical Problems of Combating Crime of the Institute of State and Law of the Russian Academy of Sciences.

Yakovlev was the author of numerous publications on constitutional law, criminal law, criminology, sociology of law and crime. He was a visiting professor at the University of Alberta, York, Toronto, Rutgers University, Emory University.

Yakovlev died in Moscow on 26 May 2011.
