= Alexander Stepanovich Yakovlev =

Russian/Soviet writer

Alexander Yakovlev
- Born: 23 November 1886; Volsk, Saratov Governorate, Russian Empire
- Died: 4 November 1953 (aged 66); Moscow, Soviet Union

Alexander Stepanovich Yakovlev (Russian: Алекса́ндр Степа́нович Я́ковлев) (23 November 1886 – 4 November 1953) was a Russian/Soviet writer.

== Biography ==
Yakovlev was born into the family of a house painter in the town of Volsk. He fought in World War 1. His works concentrate on the lives of working-class people. Yakovlev is credited with being one of the first writers to depict the Russian Revolution of 1917 on a broad canvas in his novel October (1918). He was the author of many novels, including Fires in the Field (1934–35) and Steps (1940), and a number of stories and essays. He also chronicled the rescue attempts made on the expeditions of Nobile and Roald Amundsen, in which he took part. He died in Moscow in 1953.

== English translations ==
- The Peasant, from The Salt Pit and Other Stories, Raduga, Moscow, 1988.
