= Kommersant =

Russian daily newspaper

- Front page on 27 December 2010
- Type: Daily newspaper
- Owner: Alisher Usmanov
- Founder: Vladimir Yakovlev
- Editor-in-chief: Mikhail Loukin
- Founded: 1989; 37 years ago
- Language: Russian
- Headquarters: Moscow
- Circulation: 120,000–130,000 (July 2013)
- ISSN: 1561-347X (print); 1563-6380 (web)
- OCLC number: 244126120
- Website: www.kommersant.ru

Kommersant (Russian: Коммерсантъ, IPA: [kəmʲɪrˈsant], The Businessman or Commerce Man, often shortened to Ъ) is a nationally distributed daily newspaper published in Russia mostly devoted to politics and business. The TNS Media and NRS Russia certified July 2013 circulation of the daily was 120,000–130,000.

It is widely considered to be one of Russia's three main business dailies (together with Vedomosti and RBK Daily).

== History ==
The original Kommersant newspaper was established in Moscow in 1909, but was shut down by the Bolsheviks following the October Revolution in 1917.

In 1989, with the onset of press freedom in Russia, Kommersant was relaunched under the ownership of businessman and publicist Vladimir Yakovlev. The first issue was released in January 1990. It was modeled after Western business journalism.

The newspaper's title is spelled in Russian with a terminal hard sign (ъ) – a letter that is silent at the end of a word in modern Russian, and was thus largely abolished by the post-revolution Russian spelling reform, in reference to the original Kommersant. This is played up in the Kommersant logo, which features a script hard sign at the end of somewhat more formal font. The newspaper also refers to itself or its redaction as "Ъ".

Founded as a weekly newspaper, it became popular among business and political elites. It then became a daily newspaper in 1992. It was owned by the businessman Boris Berezovsky from 1999 until 2006, when he sold it to Badri Patarkatsishvili. In September 2006, it was sold to Alisher Usmanov.

In January 2005, Kommersant published a protest at a court ruling ordering it to publish a denial of a story about a crisis at Alfa-Bank. In 2008, BBC News named Kommersant one of Russia's leading liberal business broadsheets.

It has been argued that Kommersant strategically uses an ironic tone in its reporting, expressed in "creative neologisms, wordplay, metaphors, and legally imposed euphemisms", allowing it to maintain a degree of independence in periods of severe state censorship.
