= Sergei Yakovlev =

Sergei Yakovlev may refer to:

- Sergei Yakovlev (actor) (1925–1996), Russian actor
- Sergei Yakovlev (cyclist) (born 1976), Kazakhstani road-bicycle racer
- Sergey Yakovlev (diplomat), Russian diplomat and ambassador to Israel, 2011–2015
