= Ian McCall (fighter) =

American mixed martial artist

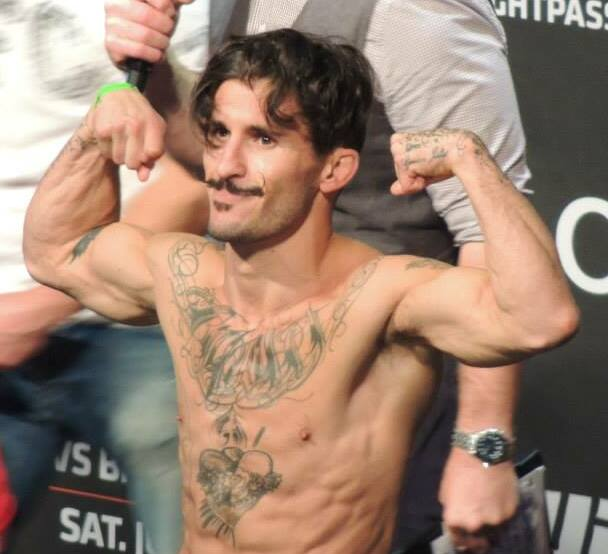
- Ian McCall at the UFC 183 Weigh-ins
- Born: Ian Gregory McCall; July 5, 1984 (age 42); Costa Mesa, California, U.S.
- Other names: Uncle Creepy
- Height: 5 ft 5 in (1.65 m)
- Weight: 136 lb (62 kg; 9 st 10 lb)
- Division: Flyweight; Bantamweight
- Style: Wrestling, Kung Fu
- Fighting out of: Dana Point, California, United States
- Team: Team Oyama
- Rank: Black belt in Kung Fu black belt in Brazilian Jiu-Jitsu
- Years active: 2002–2018

Mixed martial arts record
- Total: 21
- Wins: 13
- By knockout: 4
- By submission: 3
- By decision: 6
- Losses: 7
- By knockout: 2
- By submission: 1
- By decision: 4
- Draws: 1

Other information
- Mixed martial arts record from Sherdog

Ian Gregory McCall (born July 5, 1984) is a retired American mixed martial artist who competed in the Flyweight and Bantamweight divisions of several prominent MMA promotions, including Ultimate Fighting Championship, Rizin Fighting Federation and World Extreme Cagefighting. He is also a former TPF Flyweight Champion. In between his fights in January 2015 and December 2017, he had been booked for six consecutive cancelled fights, four of which were cancelled during the week of. Since retiring, McCall has become an advocate for psychedelic-assisted therapy for athletes with traumatic brain injury and founded the nonprofit https://athletesjourneyhome.com/.

== Background ==
McCall was born in Costa Mesa, California and has an older brother, Bradley McCall. McCall got into many "fights" growing up and in his youth, he practiced kung fu. He competed in wrestling for Dana Hills High School where he was a standout and then continued later at Cuesta College, before dropping out to a knee injury. He was also known to fight kids at the town center. Often striking kids for no reason besides being a bully. He was also a part of a gang called the Lords of South County, where the gang would regularly start fights with random people, usually multiple people beating up one unsuspecting person. A few of them were charged for crimes, like former UFC fighter Rob Emerson, but Ian McCall escaped without charges. During one encounter, McCall attempted an uppercut against an unsuspecting person, but was countered with a right cross and knocked unconscious. During another scuffle, McCall actually punched a lady in the face but he claims he thought she was a man.

== Mixed martial arts career ==
=== World Extreme Cagefighting ===
In his WEC tenure, McCall defeated Coty Wheeler and lost to Charlie Valencia in 2007. McCall returned in 2009, but lost to Dominick Cruz.

=== Tachi Palace Fights ===
In February, McCall signed a deal with the California-based promotion, Tachi Palace Fights. Ian's first fight was against Jussier Formiga, who at the time was ranked as the #1 Flyweight in the world. McCall upset Formiga with a unanimous decision victory.

On May 6, 2011, McCall then defeated previously unbeaten prospect Dustin Ortiz at Tachi Palace Fights 9, setting up an August 5, 2011 championship bout with the TPF Flyweight Champion Darrell Montague at TPF 10: Tachi Palace Fights 10. He won the title by submitting Montague in round 3 with a rear naked choke.

=== Ultimate Fighting Championship ===
McCall signed with the UFC in December 2011 to compete in a four-man Flyweight Tournament to determine the inaugural UFC Flyweight Champion. He faced Demetrious Johnson in the opening round of the tournament on March 3, 2012, at UFC on FX: Alves vs. Kampmann. Johnson was initially thought to have defeated McCall by majority decision, though was later revealed that a scoring error had taken place and a majority draw was the correct result. This fight was the first flyweight bout in UFC history.

A rematch with Johnson took place on June 8, 2012, at UFC on FX 3 to determine who would meet Joseph Benavidez in the finals of the flyweight tournament. McCall lost the bout via unanimous decision.

McCall was briefly linked to a bout with promotional newcomer John Moraga on August 4, 2012, at UFC on Fox: Shogun vs. Vera. However, McCall was forced out of the bout with an issue with police and replaced by Ulysses Gomez.

McCall next faced Joseph Benavidez on February 2, 2013, at UFC 156. He lost the fight via unanimous decision.

McCall faced Iliarde Santos on August 3, 2013, at UFC 163. He won the fight via unanimous decision, earning his first UFC win. The fight also earned him his second Fight of the Night bonus award.

McCall was slated to face Scott Jorgensen on December 14, 2013, at UFC on Fox 9, but was ruled out of the bout due to injury.

McCall was expected to face Brad Pickett on March 8 at UFC Fight Night 37 in London, England. However, on 13 February, it was announced that McCall had pulled out of the bout due to injury and was replaced by promotional newcomer Neil Seery.

The rescheduled bout with Pickett took place on July 19, 2014, at UFC Fight Night 46. McCall won the bout by unanimous decision, having out struck Pickett across three rounds, while displaying strong takedowns and effective ground and pound.

McCall was expected to face John Lineker on November 8, 2014, at UFC Fight Night 56 as the co-main event. Although both fighters successfully made weight, it was announced just hours after the weigh in that McCall had been pulled from the event due to a blood infection. The bout was pulled from the event entirely.

The bout with Lineker eventually took place on January 31, 2015, at UFC 183. McCall lost the fight by unanimous decision.

A rematch with Dustin Ortiz was expected to take place on August 8, 2015, at UFC Fight Night 73. However, McCall pulled out of the fight in late July citing injury and was replaced by Willie Gates.

McCall was expected to face Justin Scoggins on July 30, 2016, at UFC 201. However, only 2 days before the event, Scoggins announced he was not going to make the contracted weight. The UFC pulled Scoggins and canceled the bout.

McCall was expected to face Ray Borg on September 10, 2016, at UFC 203. However, Borg pulled out of the fight on September 7 citing an illness. With no time to find a suitable replacement, McCall was removed from the card.

McCall was expected to face Neil Seery on November 19, 2016, at UFC Fight Night 99. However, McCall was pulled from the fight one day before it was scheduled to take place. It was rebooked for UFC 208, and this time Seery pulled out of what was expected to be his retirement bout two weeks before.

McCall was expected to face Jarred Brooks on February 11, 2017, at UFC 208. However, McCall was pulled from the fight the day it was scheduled to take place due to gastrointestinal illness.

During his layoff, McCall underwent treatment for brain-related health issues. In 2017, the United States Anti-Doping Agency cleared him of an anti-doping violation related to a saline intravenous infusion he received during the UFC 208 hospitalization, granting him a retroactive therapeutic use exemption.

McCall was granted his requested release from the UFC in October 2017.

=== Rizin Fighting Federation ===
On October 16, 2017, it was announced that McCall had signed with Japan's Rizin Fighting Federation.

McCall's debut was against Manel Kape, as part of Rizin's 2017 Bantamweight World Grand Prix. He lost the fight in the first round by doctor's stoppage due to a cut from the ring ropes.

For his second fight for the promotion, McCall faced fellow UFC veteran Kyoji Horiguchi in the main event at Rizin 10 on May 6, 2018. He lost the fight via knockout just nine seconds into the first round.

=== Retirement ===
On May 21, 2018, McCall announced his retirement during The MMA Hour podcast.

== Professional grappling career ==
McCall competed against Mike John at Subversiv 10 on April 13, 2024. He lost the match by submission.

== Personal life ==
McCall has a young daughter and a stepson.

In a 2012 interview with Ariel Helwani, McCall stated that during a hiatus after his last fight in the WEC he overdosed on a combination of oxycodone, GHB, Xanax and other tranquilizers. He awoke two days later in a hospital and later found out his breathing and heartbeat had both stopped. He was revived and recovered to full health within a matter of weeks.

By 2013, McCall said he had become sober and was focused on fatherhood. He has since spoken publicly about the mental health challenges he faced after retiring.

== Advocacy ==
After retiring from competition, McCall became an advocate for psychedelic-assisted therapy for athletes dealing with traumatic brain injury (TBI) and addiction. He is the founder and CEO of Athletes Journey Home, a nonprofit that connects retired athletes and military veterans with alternative treatments, including group ibogaine treatment at the Beond facility in Cancún, Mexico. McCall has said that ibogaine treatment helped him address dependence on pain medication and ketamine misuse. He has publicly urged UFC CEO Dana White to consider ibogaine therapy as an option for fighters with concussion-related issues.

McCall also works as a psychedelic integration coach for athletes through his practice, The McCall Method, and has spoken on a sports and psychedelics panel at the Wonderland conference in Miami.

== Championships and accomplishments ==
=== Mixed martial arts ===
- Ultimate Fighting Championship
  - Fight of the Night (Two times) vs. Demetrious Johnson and Iliarde Santos
  - First Flyweight to headline a UFC Event with Demetrious Johnson
- Tachi Palace Fights
  - TPF Flyweight Championship (One time)
- Sherdog
  - 2011 Comeback Fighter of the Year
  - 2011 All-Violence First Team

== Mixed martial arts record ==
Professional record breakdown
21 matches	13 wins	7 losses
By knockout	4	2
By submission	3	1
By decision	6	4
Draws	1	

Res.	Record	Opponent	Method	Event	Date	Round	Time	Location	Notes
Loss	13–7–1	Kyoji Horiguchi	KO (punch)	Rizin 10	May 6, 2018	1	0:09	Fukuoka, Japan	
Loss	13–6–1	Manel Kape	TKO (doctor stoppage)	Rizin World Grand Prix 2017: 2nd Round	December 29, 2017	1	1:48	Saitama, Japan	2017 Rizin Bantamweight Grand Prix Quarterfinal.
Loss	13–5–1	John Lineker	Decision (unanimous)	UFC 183	January 31, 2015	3	5:00	Las Vegas, Nevada, United States	Catchweight (130 lbs) bout; Lineker missed weight.
Win	13–4–1	Brad Pickett	Decision (unanimous)	UFC Fight Night: McGregor vs. Brandao	July 19, 2014	3	5:00	Dublin, Ireland	
Win	12–4–1	Iliarde Santos	Decision (unanimous)	UFC 163	August 3, 2013	3	5:00	Rio de Janeiro, Brazil	Fight of the Night.
Loss	11–4–1	Joseph Benavidez	Decision (unanimous)	UFC 156	February 2, 2013	3	5:00	Las Vegas, Nevada, United States	
Loss	11–3–1	Demetrious Johnson	Decision (unanimous)	UFC on FX: Johnson vs. McCall	June 8, 2012	3	5:00	Sunrise, Florida, United States	UFC Flyweight Tournament semifinal.
Draw	11–2–1	Demetrious Johnson	Draw (majority)	UFC on FX: Alves vs. Kampmann	March 3, 2012	3	5:00	Sydney, Australia	UFC Flyweight Tournament Semifinal; Fight of the Night.
Win	11–2	Darrell Montague	Submission (rear-naked choke)	TPF 10: Let The Chips Fall	August 5, 2011	3	2:15	Lemoore, California, United States	Won Tachi Palace Fights Flyweight Championship.
Win	10–2	Dustin Ortiz	Decision (unanimous)	TPF 9: The Contenders	May 6, 2011	3	5:00	Lemoore, California, United States	
Win	9–2	Jussier Formiga	Decision (unanimous)	TPF 8: All or Nothing	February 18, 2011	3	5:00	Lemoore, California, United States	Flyweight debut.
Win	8–2	Jeff Willingham	Submission (triangle choke)	MEZ Sports: Pandemonium 3	November 19, 2010	1	2:17	Los Angeles, California, United States	
Loss	7–2	Dominick Cruz	Decision (unanimous)	WEC 38	January 25, 2009	3	5:00	San Diego, California, United States	
Win	7–1	Kevin Dunsmoor	Decision (unanimous)	Total Combat 32	October 2, 2008	3	5:00	El Cajon, California, United States	
Loss	6–1	Charlie Valencia	Submission (guillotine choke)	WEC 31	December 12, 2007	1	3:19	Las Vegas, Nevada, United States	
Win	6–0	Coty Wheeler	TKO (punches)	WEC 30	September 5, 2007	3	4:34	Las Vegas, Nevada, United States	
Win	5–0	Rick McCorkell	KO (punch)	Battle in the Ballroom: Summer Fist 2007	June 28, 2007	1	0:13	Costa Mesa, California, United States	
Win	4–0	Chris David	Decision (unanimous)	Total Combat 15	July 15, 2006	3	N/A	San Diego, California, United States	
Win	3–0	Musa Toliver	TKO (corner stoppage)	WFC: Rumble at the Ramada	December 8, 2005	2	N/A	Norwalk, California, United States	
Win	2–0	Chris Acevedo	TKO (corner stoppage)	Crown Fighting Championship 1	September 4, 2004	1	N/A	Rosarito Beach, Mexico	
Win	1–0	Jerry Samson	Submission (rear-naked choke)	Warriors Quest 6: Best of the Best	August 3, 2002	2	2:32	Honolulu, Hawaii, United States	

== See also ==
- List of current UFC fighters
- List of male mixed martial artists
