= Alexander Yakovlev (entomologist) =

Russian painter

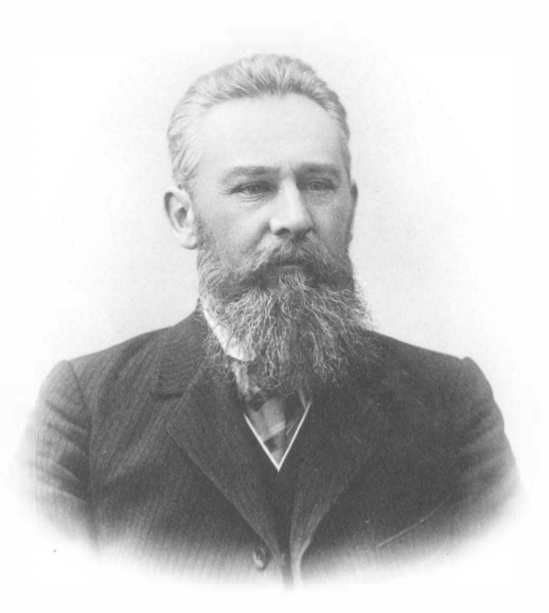

Alexander Ivanovich Yakovlev (spelled Jakowlew, Jakowleff, Jakovlev in German and French), (22 February 1863 – 28 December 1909) was a Russian entomologist and painter.

Yakovlev lived in Saint Petersburg. He was primarily interested in Coleoptera.

== Selected works ==
- [Яковлев, А.И.] Jakovlev, A.I. Dytiscides nouveaux on peu connus I. Horae Societitas Entomologicae Rossicae 30:175-183 (1896).
- Dytiscides nouveaux on peu connus. II Horae Societitas Entomologicae Rossicae 32:504–509 (1898,1899).
- Dytiscidarum novarum diagnoses L’Abeille 29:37-41. (1897)
