= Vladimir Yakovlev (journalist) =

Russian journalist

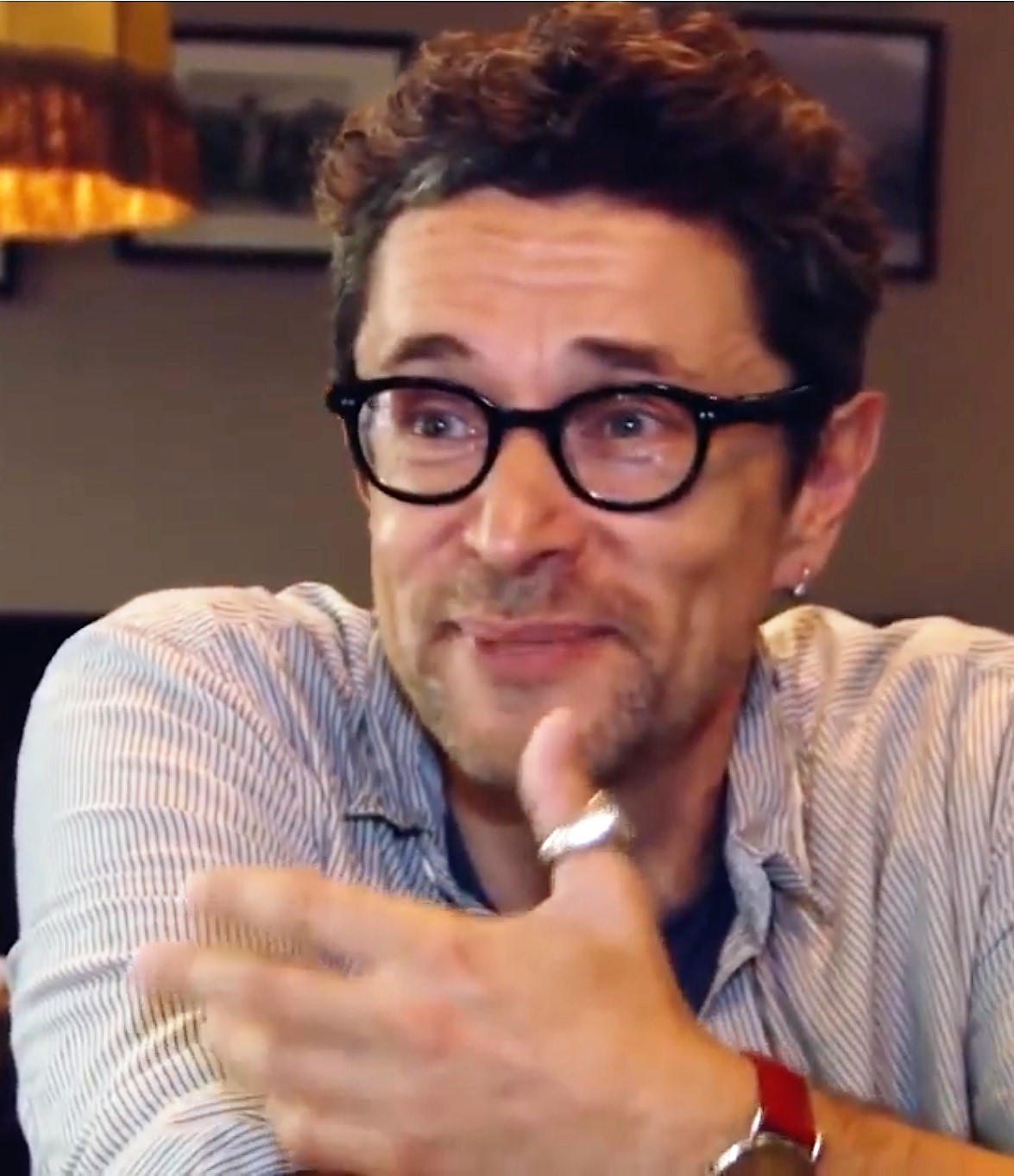
- Yakovlev on Planeta.ru in 2014
- Born: Vladimir Yegorovich Yakovlev; March 8, 1959 (age 67); Moscow, Russian SFSR, Soviet Union
- Education: Lomonosov Moscow State University
- Children: son
- Father: Yegor Vladimirovich Yakovlev

Vladimir Yegorovich Yakovlev (Russian: Владимир Егорович Яковлев, born March 8, 1959) is a founder and an editor-in-chief of the Kommersant, the first Russian daily business-oriented newspaper. He is a former CEO and owner of Kommersant Publishing house.

== Biography ==
=== Early life and career ===
Vladimir was born into the family of the famous Soviet journalist Yegor Vladimirovich Yakovlev.

He graduated from the International Division of the School of Journalism of Lomonosov Moscow State University.

Yakovlev was placed on a job in the Newspaper Soviet Russia. He then went on to work in the Magazine Rabotnitsa, the Sobesednik Weekly. Up to 1988 Yakovlev was a correspondent of Ogoniok Magazine.

Since June 15, 1988 Yakovlev was a founder and a president of Fakt informational cooperative society (it was created in cooperation with Gleb Pavlovsky). Originally, the organization was created in the format of an information and reference service in order to “provide its potential readers – members of the booming cooperative movement – with facts: contact details, references, texts of regulatory acts and documents”.

In 1989 at the suggestion of the vice-president of Fakt, the USSR cooperators’ union, Artem Tarasov Yakovlev together with Gleb Pavlovsky started an independent news agency and newspaper Kommersant. The pilot issue of the weekly newspaper was in December 1989.

From 1989 up to 1999 Yakovlev was the owner and editor-in-chief of Kommersant Newspaper, which was the basis of the homonymous publishing house. Since 1992 Yakovlev, being the majority shareholder, took up a post as CEO of Kommersant Joint-Stock Company (up to 1992 Vladimir was the editor-in-chief of the newspaper).

Simultaneously, Yakovlev was engaged in various projects such as Domovoy Magazine, together with V. D. Drannikov, a famous journalist, but none became as famous as Kommersant.

In 1999 the majority of shares of Kommersant publishing house were purchased by Boris Berezovsky and Badri Patarkatsishvili through the American Capital Group. Kommersant Newspaper, Dengi, Vlast, Ogoniok, Autopilot, Sekret Firmy, Weekend, Citizen K. Magazines, Kommersant FM Radio station and Kommersant TV Channel were among the assets of the publishing group.

=== After Kommersant ===
In 2007 Yakovlev became the CEO of Stream Continent Company, which was a content agency for cable television (an affiliate of Sistema Analytical finance company, currently Stream Channel Joint-Stock Company).

Since 2007 Yakovlev was a member of the board of directors of Sistemy mass media, an affiliate of Sistema Analytical finance company, and in the same year he founded Content bureau.

In 2008 together with Mikhail Prokhorov he created Zhivi! Media group. The goal of the company was “launching and managing innovative media projects”. Vladimir Yakovlev's Content bureau LLC was a parent company, while ONEXIM company had 90% of the shares. The main projects of the company was Zhivi! (a project promoting a healthy lifestyle), including a homonymous channel, web-site and club; F5 (a newspaper and a web-site), Russian Pioneer Magazine and Snob Magazine (a project invented by Yakovlev). In 2009-2010 Snob expanded to the UK and USA with availability via Barnes & Noble and regional hubs. Prokhorov invested $150 million in the launch of the magazine and website targeting highly paid professionals.

At the end of 2011, Yakovlev stepped down as an editor-in-chief of the Snob project and president of the Zhivi! Media group. Nikolai Uskov (Russian GQ) became the head of the company.

In 2010, Yakovlev signed an open letter to the President of the Russian Federation asking for the quickest solving of crimes against journalists. Editors-in-chief of Novaya Gazeta, Forbes.ru, Russkiy Reporter and others also signed the open letter.

In 2011, Yakovlev officially came down on the side of journalist Maxim Kovalskiy. According to Yakovlev, the journalist was fired for writing an article “which the government wouldn’t have liked”.

In May 2012, Yakovlev started a new project called The age of happiness. It is dedicated to active ageing and is bilingual (Russian/English)

== Legacy ==
Yakovlev is thought to be the author of New Russians and Global Russians clichés.

Yakovlev is one of the Perestroika publicists who created the "Russian newspeak" of the 90's:

«This new generation – mostly the children of the men of the 60’s such as Vladimir Yakovlev, Artyom Borovik, Dmitry Lihanov, Yevgeny Dodolev, Alexander Lyubimov – are already taking their course. Being those of the gilded youth, having been brought up in huge apartments or having spent their childhood abroad, having graduated from the international division of the School of Journalism of Moscow State University, they now make a difference on the television and mass media. The perfect takeoff and innate lack of fear allows them to remove taboos and visit all the hot spots where no Soviet journalist had been before»

== Awards ==
Yakovlev received a letter of acknowledgment from the President of the Russian Federation on June 25, 1996, for active involvement of organization and conducting of the election company of the President of the Russian Federation in 1996.

He is nominated man of the year in Journalism according to the Federation of Jewish Communities of Russia.
