= UFC Fight Night: Mousasi vs. Hall 2 =

2017 mixed martial arts event

- The poster for UFC Fight Night: Mousasi vs. Hall 2
- Promotion: Ultimate Fighting Championship
- Date: November 19, 2016
- Venue: The SSE Arena
- City: Belfast, Northern Ireland
- Attendance: 7,222
- Total gate: $850,000

Event chronology
UFC 205: Alvarez vs. McGregor	UFC Fight Night: Mousasi vs. Hall 2	UFC Fight Night: Bader vs. Nogueira 2

UFC Fight Night: Mousasi vs. Hall 2 (also known as UFC Fight Night 99) was a mixed martial arts event produced by the Ultimate Fighting Championship that was held on November 19, 2016 at The SSE Arena in Belfast, Northern Ireland

== Background ==
The event was the second that the organisation hosted in Northern Ireland, with the first being UFC 72 in June 2007.

A welterweight bout between ranked contenders Dong Hyun Kim and Gunnar Nelson was expected to serve as the headlined of the event. However, on 21 October, it was announced that Nelson pulled out due to an injury and the fight was cancelled. Kim was rescheduled to compete at UFC 207. In turn, a middleweight rematch between former Strikeforce Light Heavyweight Champion Gegard Mousasi and Uriah Hall was announced as the new headliner. The pairing met previously in September 2015 at UFC Fight Night: Barnett vs. Nelson with Hall taking the victory via second round highlight reel TKO in what was considered a huge upset.

A lightweight bout between Ross Pearson and James Krause was originally booked for The Ultimate Fighter: Team Joanna vs. Team Cláudia Finale. However, Krause pulled out due to undisclosed reasons. The fight was later rescheduled for this event and was expected to serve as the co-main event. Subsequently, on 26 October, Krause pulled out of the fight citing a torn hamstring. He was then replaced by Stevie Ray.

As a result of the cancellation of UFC Fight Night: Lamas vs. Penn, a flyweight bout between Kyoji Horiguchi and Ali Bagautinov was rescheduled for this event.

At the weigh-ins, Zak Cummings came in at 172.8 lb, almost two pounds over the welterweight limit of 171 lb. As a result, Cummings was fined 20% of his purse, which went to his opponent Alexander Yakovlev and the bout proceeded as scheduled at a catchweight.

A flyweight bout between Ian McCall and Neil Seery was scheduled for the event. However, as Seery was weighing in for the event, it was announced that McCall had to pull out of the fight after becoming ill due to the effects of his weight cut and the bout was scrapped.

== Results ==
Main Card (UFC Fight Pass)
Weight class				Method	Round	Time	Notes
Middleweight	Gegard Mousasi	def.	Uriah Hall	TKO (punches)	1	4:37
Lightweight	Stevie Ray	def.	Ross Pearson	Decision (split) (27–30, 30–27, 30–27)	3	5:00
Heavyweight	Alexander Volkov	def.	Timothy Johnson	Decision (split) (29–28, 27–30, 29–28)	3	5:00
Featherweight	Artem Lobov	def.	Teruto Ishihara	Decision (unanimous) (30–27, 30–27, 29–28)	3	5:00
Preliminary Card (UFC Fight Pass)
Middleweight	Jack Marshman	def.	Magnus Cedenblad	TKO (punches)	2	3:32
Flyweight	Kyoji Horiguchi	def.	Ali Bagautinov	Decision (unanimous) (30–27, 30–27, 30–27)	3	5:00
Lightweight	Kevin Lee	def.	Magomed Mustafaev	Technical Submission (rear-naked choke)	2	4:31
Women's Strawweight	Amanda Cooper	def.	Anna Elmose	Decision (unanimous) (30–27, 29–28, 29–28)	3	5:00
Heavyweight	Justin Ledet	def.	Mark Godbeer	Submission (rear-naked choke)	1	2:16
Catchweight (172.8 lb)	Zak Cummings	def.	Alexander Yakovlev	Submission (straight armbar)	2	4:02
Women's Bantamweight	Marion Reneau	def.	Milana Dudieva	TKO (punches and elbows)	3	3:03
Bantamweight	Brett Johns	def.	Kwan Ho Kwak	Decision (unanimous) (30–27, 30–27, 30–27)	3	5:00
Welterweight	Abdul Razak Alhassan	def.	Charlie Ward	KO (punches)	1	0:53

== Bonus awards ==
The following fighters were awarded $50,000 bonuses:

- Fight of the Night: Not awarded
- Performance of the Night: Jack Marshman, Kevin Lee, Justin Ledet and Abdul Razak Alhassan

== See also ==
- List of UFC events
- 2016 in UFC
