= Yan Cabral =

Brazilian Jiu-Jitsu practitioner and mixed martial artist

- Born: Yan Cabral; 13 May 1983 (age 43); Rio de Janeiro, Brazil
- Height: 5 ft 11 in (180 cm)
- Weight: 155 lb (70 kg; 11 st 1 lb)
- Division: Lightweight (155 lb)
- Reach: 73 in (185 cm)
- Style: Brazilian Jiu-Jitsu
- Fighting out of: Barcelona, Spain
- Team: Nova União
- Rank: 5th degree black belt in BJJ
- Years active: 2007–present (MMA)

Mixed martial arts record
- Total: 18
- Wins: 15
- By knockout: 1
- By submission: 13
- By decision: 1
- Losses: 3
- By knockout: 1
- By decision: 2

Other information
- Occupation: Brazilian jiu-jitsu instructor
- Mixed martial arts record from Sherdog

Yan Cabral (born 13 May 1983 in Rio de Janeiro, Brazil) is a mixed martial artist, grappler and 5th degree Brazilian jiu-jitsu black belt practitioner and instructor associated with the Nova União academy. A former UFC fighter, Cabral trained mixed martial art (MMA) competing in the lightweight division. Head coach of the Aranha Association team, Cabral teaches out of Barcelona.

== Mixed Martial Arts career ==
=== Background and early career ===
Cabral currently trains with team Nova Uniao alongside fighters such as Wagnney Fabiano, former UFC Featherweight Champion José Aldo, former UFC Bantamweight Champion Renan Barão.

Cabral made his professional MMA debut fighting in Luxembourg in December 2007. Over the next four years, he quickly amassed an undefeated record of 10-0. All of his wins have come via submission with Cabral never having been into the third round in any of his fights.

=== DREAM ===
In 2011, Cabral signed with DREAM to compete in their welterweight division. In his debut, he faced Kazushi Sakuraba at Dream.17. Cabral won the fight via submission in the second round, earning him his highest profile win to date.

=== The Ultimate Fighter: Brazil ===
In March 2013, it was revealed that Cabral was a cast member of The Ultimate Fighter: Brazil 2. He won his elimination fight to get into the TUF house, defeating Ronaldo Oliveira Silva by rear naked choke submission in round 1. He was chosen to be a member of Team Werdum and defeated David Vieira before being removed from the show due to a broken hand. At this point Cabral held an MMA record of 12 fights and 12 wins all by submission.

=== Ultimate Fighting Championship ===
Cabral made his official UFC debut at UFC Fight Night: Maia vs. Shields, where he defeated David Mitchell by unanimous decision.

In his second fight for the promotion, Cabral faced Zak Cummings at UFC Fight Night: Brown vs. Silva. Despite controlling Cummings on the ground for a large portion of the fight, Cabral lost the fight by unanimous decision.

Cabral returned on 25 October 2014 at UFC 179, where he faced Naoyuki Kotani. Cabral won the fight via second round rear naked choke.

Cabral was expected to face Mairbek Taisumov on 24 January 2015 at UFC on Fox 14. However, Cabral was pulled from the fight for undisclosed reasons and was replaced by promotional newcomer Anthony Christodoulou.

Cabral was expected to face K. J. Noons on 30 May 2015 at UFC Fight Night 67. However, Cabral was forced out of the bout after contracting Dengue Fever and replaced by Alex Oliveira.

Cabral faced Johnny Case on 7 November 2015 at UFC Fight Night 77. He lost the fight by unanimous decision. Cabral faced Reza Madadi on 8 May 2016 at UFC Fight Night 87. He lost the fight via TKO in the third round after a brutal uppercut. Following his loss against Madadi, Cabral was released from the UFC.

=== After the UFC ===
In january 2017, Yan Cabral came back in the octagon to face Zalimkhan Yusupov at the World Kings Glory MMA 2. Cabral displayed high level jiu jitsu to win by RNC. He then came back in december 2017, for a second fight in China. He faced Peng Yang at The Legend King Championship 4 and won by submission.

He was expected to face John Maguire in May 2020 in Madrid but the fight was cancelled because of the coronavirus crisis.

Cabral came back to fight in May 2024, for AFL 34 against Mauricio Otalora, in Badalona, a city close to Barcelona, where Cabral lives. He won the fight by TKO. Following his win, he retired from MMA at the age of 41, surrounded by his team and his family.

== Professional grappling career ==
Cabral is due to compete against Joao Zeferino of ADXC 6 on October 25, 2024.

== Championships and achievements ==
=== Brazilian jiu-jitsu ===
Main Achievements (at Adult black belt level):

- Copa do Mundo World Champion (2009)
- 2nd Place Copa do Mundo (2008)
- 2nd Place IBJJF European Championship (2009 / 2007)
- 3rd Place Rio Open IBJJF (2008)
- 2nd Place Sydney Open IBJJF (2017)
- 1st Place Paris Spring Open IBJJF (2018)
- 2nd Place Geneva Open IBJJF (2019)
- 2nd Place Rome Open IBJJF (2019)

Main Achievements (at Master 1 black belt level):

- ACB World Champion (2019)
- 2nd Place Abu Dhabi World Masters Jiu Jitsu Championship (2020)
- Abu Dhabi Grand Slam Champion - Abu Dhabi (2020)
- Abu Dhabi Grand Slam Champion - Los Angeles (2019)
- 2nd Place Abu Dhabi Grand Slam - Tokyo (2019)
- 2nd Place Abu Dhabi Grand Slam - Moscow (2019)

Main Achievements at colored belts :

- 3rd Place World IBJJF Jiu-Jitsu Championship (2001) at blue belt
- 2nd Place Brazilian National IBJJF Jiu-Jitsu Championship (2002) at purple belt

== Mixed martial arts record ==
Professional record breakdown
18 matches	15 wins	3 losses
By knockout	1	1
By submission	13	0
By decision	1	2

Res.	Record	Opponent	Method	Event	Date	Round	Time	Location	Notes
Win	15–3	Mauricio Otalora	TKO (punches)	Ansgar Fighting League 34	25 May 2024	1	1:51	Badalona, Spain	Catchweight (181 lb) bout.
Win	14–3	Peng Yang	Submission (triangle armbar)	The Legend King Championship 4	23 December 2017	1	1:07	Yantai, China	
Win	13–3	Zalimkhan Yusupov	Technical Submission (rear-naked choke)	World Kings Glory MMA 2	6 January 2017	1	1:01	Harbin, China	
Loss	12–3	Reza Madadi	TKO (punches)	UFC Fight Night: Overeem vs. Arlovski	8 May 2016	3	1:56	Rotterdam, Netherlands	
Loss	12–2	Johnny Case	Decision (unanimous)	UFC Fight Night: Belfort vs. Henderson 3	7 November 2015	3	5:00	São Paulo, Brazil	
Win	12–1	Naoyuki Kotani	Submission (rear-naked choke)	UFC 179	25 October 2014	2	3:06	Rio de Janeiro, Brazil	Lightweight debut.
Loss	11–1	Zak Cummings	Decision (unanimous)	UFC Fight Night: Brown vs. Silva	10 May 2014	3	5:00	Cincinnati, Ohio, United States	
Win	11–0	David Mitchell	Decision (unanimous)	UFC Fight Night: Maia vs. Shields	9 October 2013	3	5:00	Barueri, Brazil	
Win	10–0	Kazushi Sakuraba	Submission (arm-triangle choke)	Dream 17	24 September 2011	2	2:42	Saitama, Japan	
Win	9–0	Djordje Beric	Submission (arm-triangle choke)	Strength and Honor Championship 2	10 April 2010	1	1:30	Geneva, Switzerland	
Win	8–0	Arbi Agujev	Submission (armbar)	Vienna Fight Night: Fabulous Las Vegas	24 January 2010	2	1:40	Vienna, Austria	
Win	7–0	Peter Angerer	Submission (kimura)	Strength and Honor Championship 1	26 September 2009	1	3:45	Geneva, Switzerland	
Win	6–0	Mattias Awad	Submission (arm-triangle choke)	Superior Challenge 3	30 May 2009	2	2:35	Stockholm, Sweden	
Win	5–0	Gary Kono	Submission (arm-triangle choke)	Yamabushi: Combat Sport Night 5	2 May 2009	1	1:30	Geneva, Switzerland	
Win	4–0	Catalin Ersen	Submission (arm-triangle choke)	Almogavers 1	22 March 2009	2	1:33	Barcelona, Spain	
Win	3–0	Francis Guilherme	Submission (kimura)	Shooto: Brazil 8	30 August 2008	2	2:18	Rio de Janeiro, Brazil	
Win	2–0	Christos Petroutsos	Submission (armbar)	Fight Fiesta de Luxe: Unstoppable	5 April 2008	1	4:37	Luxembourg City, Luxembourg	
Win	1–0	Chas Jacquier	Submission (rear-naked choke)	Fight Fiesta: de Luxe 3	22 December 2007	1	N/A	Luxembourg City, Luxembourg	

== See also ==
- List of current UFC fighters
- List of male mixed martial artists
