= Patrick Cronin =

Patrick Cronin may refer to:

- Patrick Henry Cronin (died 1889), member of Clan na Gael murdered in 1889
- Patrick Cronin (bishop) (1913–1991), Irish Roman Catholic archbishop of Cagayan de Oro
- Patrick Cronin (actor) (born 1941), stage, television, and film actor
- Patrick Cronin (hurler) (born 1987), Irish hurler
- Patrick John Cronin (1996–2016), person killed in a Melbourne coward-punch attack
