= UFC 293 =

Mixed martial arts event in 2023

UFC 293: Adesanya vs. Strickland
- The poster for UFC 293: Adesanya vs. Strickland
- Promotion: Ultimate Fighting Championship
- Date: September 10, 2023
- Venue: Qudos Bank Arena
- City: Sydney, Australia
- Attendance: 18,168
- Total gate: $6,860,000

Event chronology
| UFC Fight Night: Gane vs. Spivac | UFC 293: Adesanya vs. Strickland | UFC Fight Night: Grasso vs. Shevchenko 2 |

UFC 293: Adesanya vs. Strickland was a mixed martial arts event produced by the Ultimate Fighting Championship that took place on September 10, 2023, at the Qudos Bank Arena in Sydney, Australia.

== Background ==
The event marked the promotion's sixth visit to Sydney and first since UFC Fight Night: Werdum vs. Tybura in November 2017.

A UFC Middleweight Championship bout between current two-time champion Israel Adesanya and Sean Strickland headlined the event. Former title challenger Jared Cannonier served as backup and potential replacement for this fight.

A women's flyweight bout between Casey O'Neill and Viviane Araújo was expected to take place at this event. However, O'Neill pulled out due to injury and was replaced by Jennifer Maia, with the new matchup being pushed back to UFC Fight Night: Yusuff vs. Barboza.

A flyweight bout between former interim UFC Flyweight Championship challenger Kai Kara-France and former Rizin Bantamweight Champion Manel Kape was expected to take place at the event. However, Kara-France withdrew after sustaining a concussion in training. He was replaced by promotional newcomer Felipe dos Santos.

A lightweight bout between Nasrat Haqparast and Sam Patterson was expected to take place the week prior at UFC Fight Night: Gane vs. Spivak. However, Patterson pulled out due to health issues. A replacement was found in promotional newcomer, Landon Quinones, who had previously competed on Season 31 of The Ultimate Fighter earlier in the year, and the pairing was moved to this event.

At the weigh-ins, Shane Young weighed in at 149.75 pounds, three and three-quarters pounds over the featherweight non-title fight limit. His bout proceeded at catchweight and he was fined 30% of his purse, which went to his opponent Gabriel Miranda.

== Results ==
Main card
| Weight class | | | | Method | Round | Time | Notes |
|---|---|---|---|---|---|---|---|
| Middleweight | Sean Strickland | def. | Israel Adesanya (c) | Decision (unanimous) (49–46, 49–46, 49–46) | 5 | 5:00 | (Note: For the UFC Middleweight Championship.) |
| Heavyweight | Alexander Volkov | def. | Tai Tuivasa | Submission (Ezekiel choke) | 2 | 4:37 |
| Flyweight | Manel Kape | def. | Felipe dos Santos | Decision (unanimous) (30–27, 29–28, 29–28) | 3 | 5:00 |
| Heavyweight | Justin Tafa | def. | Austen Lane | KO (punches) | 1 | 1:22 |
| Light Heavyweight | Tyson Pedro | def. | Anton Turkalj | KO (punches) | 1 | 2:12 |
Preliminary card (ESPN / ESPN+)
| Light Heavyweight | Carlos Ulberg | def. | Jung Da-un | Submission (rear-naked choke) | 3 | 4:49 |
| Featherweight | Chepe Mariscal | def. | Jack Jenkins | TKO (arm injury) | 2 | 3:19 |
| Lightweight | Jamie Mullarkey | def. | John Makdessi | Decision (unanimous) (29–28, 29–28, 29–28) | 3 | 5:00 |
| Lightweight | Nasrat Haqparast | def. | Landon Quiñones | Decision (unanimous) (30–27, 30–27, 30–27) | 3 | 5:00 |
Early preliminary card (ESPN+ / UFC Fight Pass)
| Welterweight | Charlie Radtke | def. | Mike Mathetha | Decision (unanimous) (29–27, 29–27, 29–27) | 3 | 5:00 | (Note: Mathetha was deducted 1 point in Round 3 due to repeated groin strikes.) |
| Catchweight (149.75 lb) | Gabriel Miranda | def. | Shane Young | Technical Submission (rear-naked choke) | 1 | 0:59 |
| Welterweight | Kevin Jousset | def. | Kiefer Crosbie | Submission (rear-naked choke) | 1 | 4:49 |

== Bonus awards ==
The following fighters received $50,000 bonuses.

- Fight of the Night: Manel Kape vs. Felipe dos Santos
- Performance of the Night: Sean Strickland and Justin Tafa

== See also ==
- 2023 in UFC
- List of current UFC fighters
- List of UFC events
- Mixed martial arts in Australia
