= Sydney lockout laws =

Laws to reduce alcoholic violence in Sydney, Australia

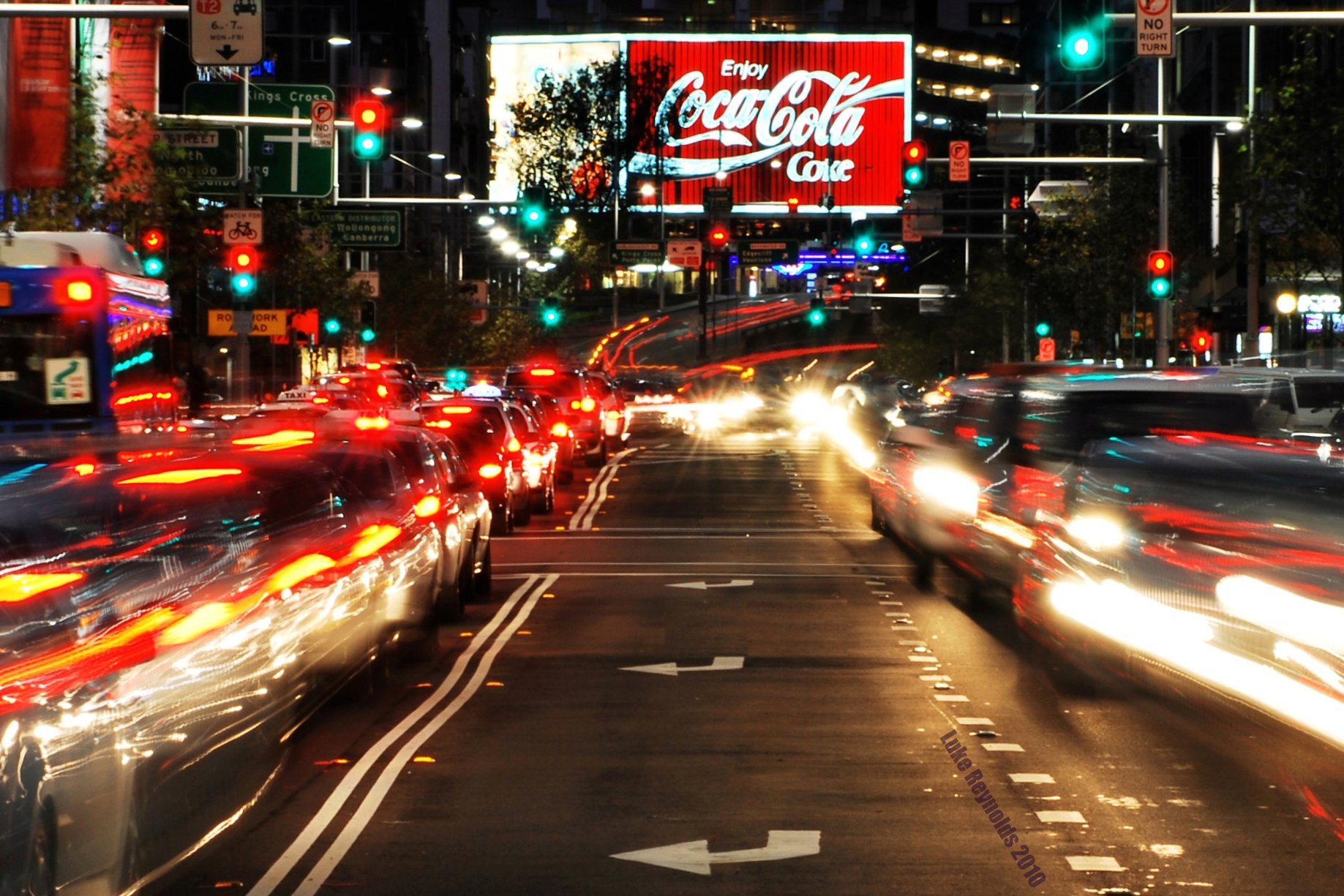
William Street May 2010

The Sydney lockout laws were introduced by the Government of New South Wales from February 2014 to January 2020 in the CBD and Oxford Street (and, until March 2021, for Kings Cross) with the objective of reducing alcohol-fuelled violence. The legislation required 1:30 a.m. lockouts (after which no new patrons could be admitted to a venue) and 3:00 a.m. last drinks at bars, pubs and clubs in the Sydney CBD entertainment precinct. The precinct, defined in regulations, was bounded by Kings Cross, Darlinghurst, Cockle Bay, The Rocks and Haymarket.

While data showed that the lockout laws did help reduce alcohol-related violence, concerns were raised about the impact of the law on Sydney's night-time economy.

In 2016, the law was subject to an independent review, conducted by Ian Callinan. In response, the NSW Government announced it would "maintain Sydney’s lockout laws and implement the key recommendations" which included relaxing the last drinks and lockout laws by half an hour for live entertainment venues in a two-year trial.

In September 2019, a NSW Parliamentary committee recommended that the lockout laws should be removed by the end of the year, with the exception of Kings Cross, where restrictions will be retained. Medical professionals and representatives of emergency services workers opposed repeal.

On 28 November 2019, the NSW Government announced that the lockout laws would be lifted in Sydney's CBD and Oxford Street from 14 January 2020. On 8 February 2021, the NSW government announced the lockout laws would be lifted from the remaining area, Kings Cross, from 8 March 2021.

== Context ==
=== 2014: Daniel Christie one-hit punch incident ===
Teenager Daniel Christie died in January 2014, the victim of a coward punch. He had been out celebrating New Year's Eve in Kings Cross. His assault, a random attack at 9 p.m., was just metres from the site where teenager Thomas Kelly had been fatally punched in July 2012.

=== Other incidents ===
Similar killings on the streets of Kings Cross and the Sydney CBD in that period included those of Calum Grant in 2011, Wilson Duque Castillo in 2012 and Lucio Rodrigues in 2013, bringing the tally to "five deaths in three years".

=== Family and popular opinion ===
Christie's family called upon politicians to set laws that would help to stop alcohol-related violence.

Within weeks of Christie's death, the O'Farrell ministry met to discuss a new package of measures to address community concerns on the issue.

== Legislation ==
=== Legislative change ===
Premier Barry O'Farrell announced his government's plan for the new lockout laws on 21 January 2014. The Government introduced the Liquor Amendment Bill 2014 to parliament on 31 January 2014, to amend the Liquor Act 2007 and the Liquor Regulations 2008. The Bill would give the minister a regulation-making power to declare areas as prescribed precincts and impose conditions on licensed premises within those precincts. The regulations defined the new 'CBD entertainment precinct' as the region bounded by Kings Cross, Darlinghurst, Cockle Bay, The Rocks and Haymarket, including parts of Surry Hills. The government also increased maximum prison sentences and introduced new mandatory minimums for various drug-fuelled violent offences.

In January 2026, the Minns government announced the repeal of the last lockout laws. These include: serving last drinks at 3:30 am, requiring RSA marshals at venues, plastic cups, and per-person drink limits.

=== Exemptions ===
==== Within the CBD entertainment precinct ====
The regulations exempt venues within the defined CBD entertainment precinct that have poker machines installed. These venues may permit entrance to patrons on the condition that they do not serve alcohol past 1:30 am and do not provide entertainment other than poker machines and background entertainment. Most licensed small bars (maximum 60 people), restaurants and tourist accommodation may stay open past 3am, although alcohol service is not permitted after this time.

==== Outside the CBD entertainment precinct ====
The entertainment precinct defined in regulations ends at Darling Harbour and does not include The Star casino, which is one of Sydney's most violent licensed venues.

== Impact ==
=== Effect on reducing offences ===
A report from the NSW Bureau of Crime Statistics and Research (BOCSAR) released in April 2015 showed a 26% reduction in assaults in the lockout area, and a 32% reduction in assaults in Kings Cross. In a March 2017 report, however, areas adjacent to the lockout precinct showed a 12% increase in assaults, with a 17% increase in "easy-to-reach" areas. Representatives from peak medical organisations such as the Australian Medical Association NSW and hospitals such as St Vincent's testified to the efficacy of the laws in reducing violence, trauma and injury, saying they made a difference: “We've gone from a time when people were dying, to a time when people are not dying.”

=== Effect on CBD business ===
Several venues in Kings Cross have closed since 2014, with several owners blaming the lockout laws for shutting down the late-night economy or a decrease in trade.

Pedestrian traffic dropped by 40% in Kings Cross, falling from a Saturday peak of 5,590 per hour between 1 a.m. and 2 a.m. in 2010, to a Saturday peak of 3,888 between 12 a.m. and 1 a.m. in 2015. Industry groups have claimed an 80 per cent reduction of foot traffic in Kings Cross, while the Foundation for Alcohol Research and Education claimed the decline is closer to 19 per cent.

== Controversy ==
Controversy over the lockout laws centred around finding a balance between encouraging "night life" with the associated sale of alcohol and preventing injury resulting from alcohol-related violence.

=== Support ===
Support for the laws came from medical personnel, notably including Dr Gordian Fulde, then-Director of the Emergency Department of the nearby St Vincent's Hospital, who "have to pick up the pieces". A Fairfax Media commissioned ReachTEL poll of 1,600 voters taken in August 2016 found "broad support within the community for keeping a 1:30 a.m. lockout (70 per cent) and retaining the 3 a.m. 'last drinks' time (72 per cent)". It further found that "three-quarters of young people support existing laws" and that a majority of NSW voters said the lockout laws should be extended across the state.

=== Opposition ===
Opposition to the laws came mainly from the hotel industry and business. When the law was first introduced, the NSW branch of the Australian Hotels Association said that the law would negatively impact Sydney's nighttime economy. As at April 2016, they were advocating for the lockouts to be replaced with a 'no new patrons' policy, whereby patrons arriving after 3 a.m. would have to book ahead and alcohol service could continue after 1.30am.

In September 2015, a 1000-member group named 'Reclaim the Streets' marched in protest of the lockout laws, claiming that the lockout had not solved the problem of alcohol-fuelled violence, instead pushing it into neighbouring suburbs, including Newtown. Other protests organised by 'Keep Sydney Open' such as one on 21 February 2016, attended by members of bands to protest the lockout laws, and another in October of the same year, called for the NSW Government to lift lockout laws. Organisers claimed that the laws alienated young people and destroyed the live music scene, while allowing The Star casino to remain open.

A ReachTel poll commissioned by The Sun-Herald in October 2018 found a decline in support for the laws. Citing a decline in patronage in parts of the city, Lord Mayor Clover Moore supported reversing the lockouts.

== Callinan and other reviews ==
An independent review of the lockout laws, conducted by Ian Callinan, was released in September 2016. The review considered the impact and effectiveness of the laws, but did not address some of the complaints the community had about the laws, including the impact on employment in the precincts. While largely backing the laws, the review recommended relaxing the 1:30 a.m. lockout to 2 a.m. for live entertainment venues.

In December 2016, the NSW Government released its response to the review and said it would relax the lockout law for live music venues by a half-hour in a two-year trial. In line with the review, takeaway and home delivery alcohol sales will be extended from 10 p.m. to 11 p.m. across the State.

In October 2018, Members of the NSW Government were reported to be considering relaxing the laws due to the negative impact on businesses and the reputation of Sydney on people seeking to holiday in the city.

In September 2019, the Premier hoped to introduce legislation to change or scrap them and a Parliamentary committee recommended that the sale of takeaway alcohol be extended, although retained in Kings Cross because the area was "not yet sufficiently changed to warrant a complete reversal". While the point was made that the lockout laws hoped to pre-empt crimes by predicting them, others did not see any urgency in changing the laws, arguing instead for "gradual easing of restrictions and monitoring the changes at each stage".

== See also ==
- Crime in New South Wales § Sydney
- 2am Lockout in Melbourne
- Six o'clock swill
