= Sarai Bareman =

New Zealand footballer and FIFA executive

Dame Sarai Bareman DNZM
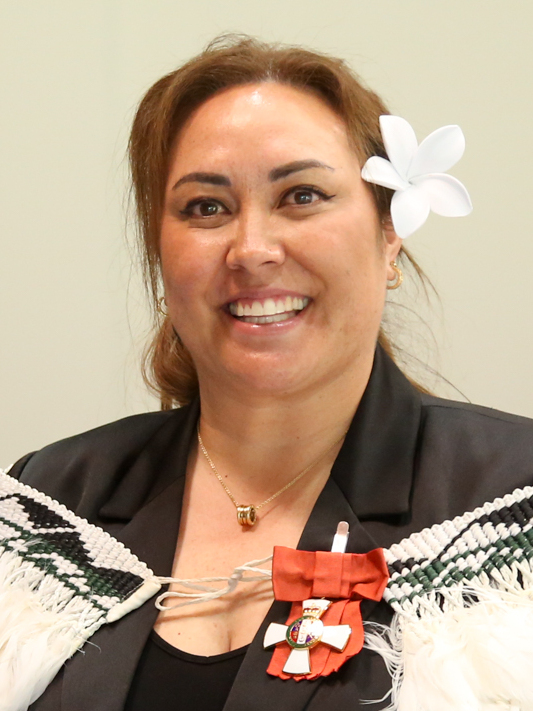
- Bareman in 2024

1st FIFA Chief Women's Football Officer
- Incumbent
- Assumed office 2016

Personal details
- Born: Sarai-Paea Bareman; 1980 or 1981 (age 44–45) Auckland, New Zealand
- Relatives: Eugene Bareman (brother)
- Occupation: Football administrator

Dame Sarai-Paea Bareman DNZM (born 1980 or 1981) is a New Zealand association football administrator and former player. She played for the Samoan national football team, and is the current chief women's football officer for FIFA.

== Early life and family ==
Bareman was born in Auckland in 1980 or 1981 to a Dutch father and a Samoan mother, and has three brothers, including the MMA trainer Eugene Bareman. She grew up in West Auckland and from 1994 to 1998 was educated at Massey High School, where she was a member of the school's 1xt XI football team.

== Career ==
As a player, Bareman played club football in Auckland for Waitakere, Glenfield and North Shore United, before moving to Samoa and representing the Samoa women's national football team.

As a football administrator, Bareman also started her journey in Samoa after leaving a 10-year career in the banking and finance industry in New Zealand. She was first employed as the finance manager for the Football Federation of Samoa, responsible for all financial matters of the national association. This appointment came at a critical time in the association's history, as they had recently been suspended by FIFA for misuse of funds by the previous administration.

After a short time in the role, Bareman was promoted to chief executive officer (CEO), where she took over the reins of the national governing body and played an instrumental role in rebuilding the sport in the country. Bareman became a prominent figure in the Pacific sporting landscape after speaking at the Pacific Youth and Sports Conference held in 2013 about her experiences as female leader in a male-dominated industry. In 2014, Bareman moved back to Auckland to take up a role as the operations manager of the Oceania Football Confederation.

After the 2015 FIFA corruption case, Bareman was appointed as the only women on the FIFA Reforms Committee. As part of the reform, Bareman advocated strongly for increasing the number of women in leadership roles within FIFA and football organisations, as well as more resourcing and prioritisation of the women's game. The reforms were approved in February 2016 at the FIFA Congress and later in the year, she was appointed as FIFA's first chief women's football officer.

In 2018, Bareman conducted the draw for the 2018 FIFA U-20 Women's World Cup in France, her first World Cup at the helm of global women's football. Later that year, Bareman also oversaw the FIFA U-17 Women's World Cup in Uruguay. In 2019, Bareman played a key role in the delivery of the 2019 FIFA Women's World Cup in France.

Bareman also led the development of FIFA's first ever global strategy for women's football, which was launched in October 2018.

In 2023, Bareman went on record to encourage federations to properly invest FIFA allocated funds towards their women's national teams. In the 2024 New Year Honours, Bareman was appointed a Dame Companion of the New Zealand Order of Merit, for services to sport.
