= Andrew Fifita =

Australia & Tonga international rugby league footballer (born 1989)

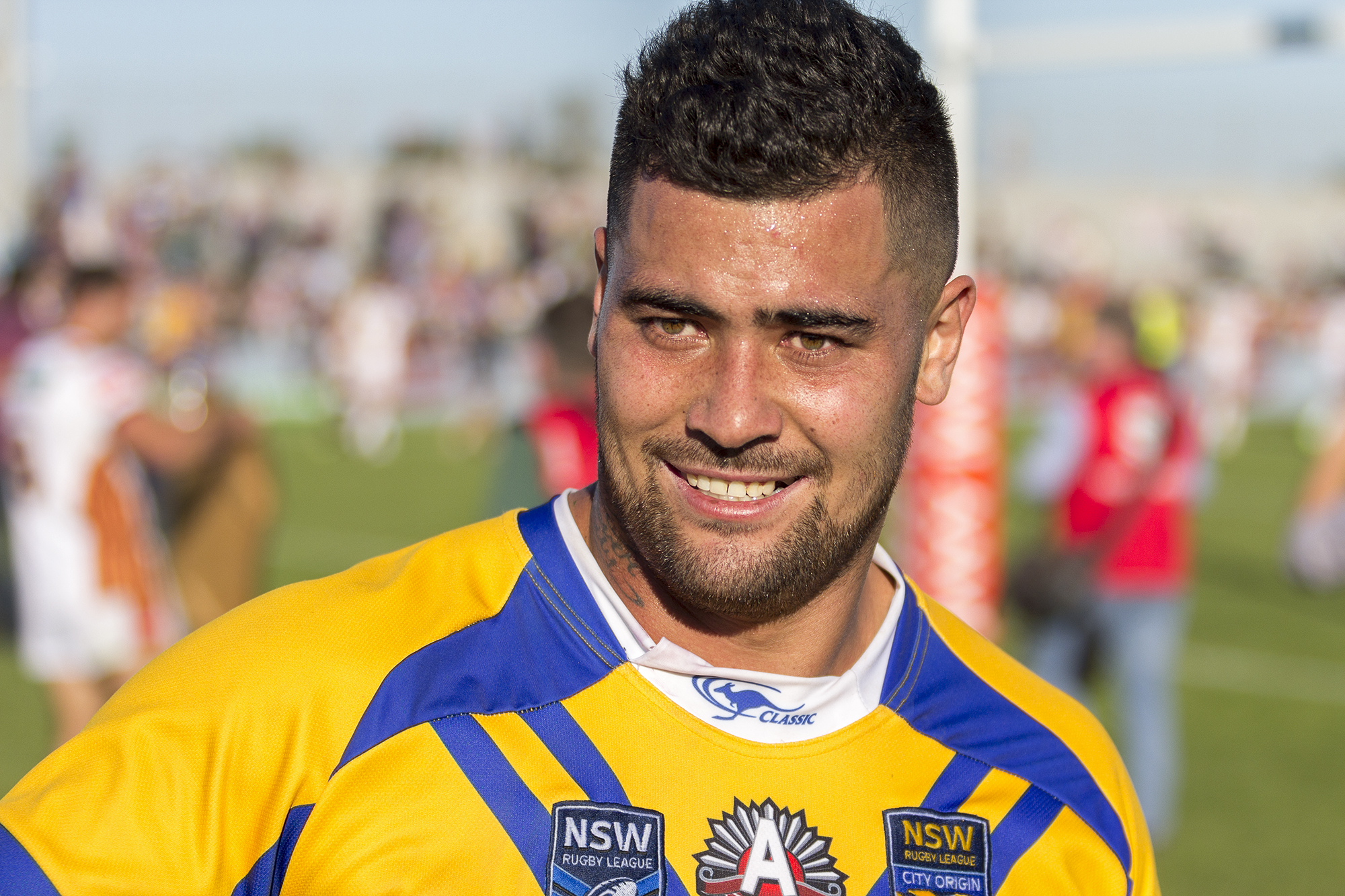

Personal information
- Full name: Andrew Fifita
- Born: 28 June 1989 (age 37) Blacktown, New South Wales, Australia
- Height: 194 cm (6 ft 4 in)
- Weight: 118 kg (18 st 8 lb)

Playing information
- Position: Prop
Club
Years	Team	Pld	T	G	FG	P
2010–11	Wests Tigers	39	8	0	0	32
2012–22	Cronulla Sharks	213	32	0	0	128
	Total	252	40	0	0	160
Representative
Years	Team	Pld	T	G	FG	P
2010–19	Tonga	10	0	0	0	0
2012–22	Indigenous All Stars	6	0	0	0	0
2013–15	NSW City	3	2	0	0	8
2013–17	New South Wales	10	2	0	0	8
2013–17	Australia	7	2	0	0	8
2017	Prime Minister's XIII	1	0	0	0	0
- Source: As of 16 December 2023
- Education: Patrician Brothers' College, Blacktown; Wyndham College
- Relatives: Latu Fifita (brother); David Fifita (brother); David Fifita (cousin); Solomon Haumono (uncle)

Andrew Fifita (born 28 June 1989) is a former professional rugby league footballer who played as a prop. He has played for Tonga and Australia at international level.

Fifita previously played for the Cronulla-Sutherland Sharks and Wests Tigers in the National Rugby League, and has played at representative level for the Indigenous All Stars, New South Wales City Origin and New South Wales in the State of Origin series.

Fifita is known for his tackle-breaks, strong fend and his step. He was a part of the Cronulla team that won their maiden premiership title in the 2016 season, scoring the equalising try that led to the game winning conversion from James Maloney.

== Early years ==
Fifita was born in Blacktown, New South Wales, Australia, of Indigenous Australian and Tongan descent. Andrew Fifita's twin brother, David Fifita played for the Wakefield Trinity as a prop.

Fifita began playing rugby league with twin brother David in the Penrith junior rugby league system before moving to Griffith, New South Wales. He attended Patrician Brothers' College, Blacktown and Wyndham College. He played junior football for the Doonside Roos, St Patricks Blacktown and the Griffith Waratahs.

As a teenager, Fifita trialled with the Sydney Roosters and the North Sydney Bears, but was considered lightweight, even though he was playing as a winger or centre at the time. Fifita said he, "tried eating and all that stuff but it didn't work and then one day I just blew out. It wasn't until I was 17 or 18 that I put the size on. Maybe it was the grog, I don't know. I was seriously pushing to get to 80 kg back then. I think I was about 70 kg." Fifita would eventually sign with the Wests Tigers and later played in their NYC team in 2009, including playing at prop in the 2009 NYC Grand Final against the Melbourne Storm in the 22–24 loss.

His twin brother David also played lower-grade for the Tigers. Fifita is not related to John Fifita, a former St George Dragons player. Fifita's elder brother Latu Fifita played for Workington Town in the Kingstone Press Championship.

== Playing career ==
=== 2010 ===
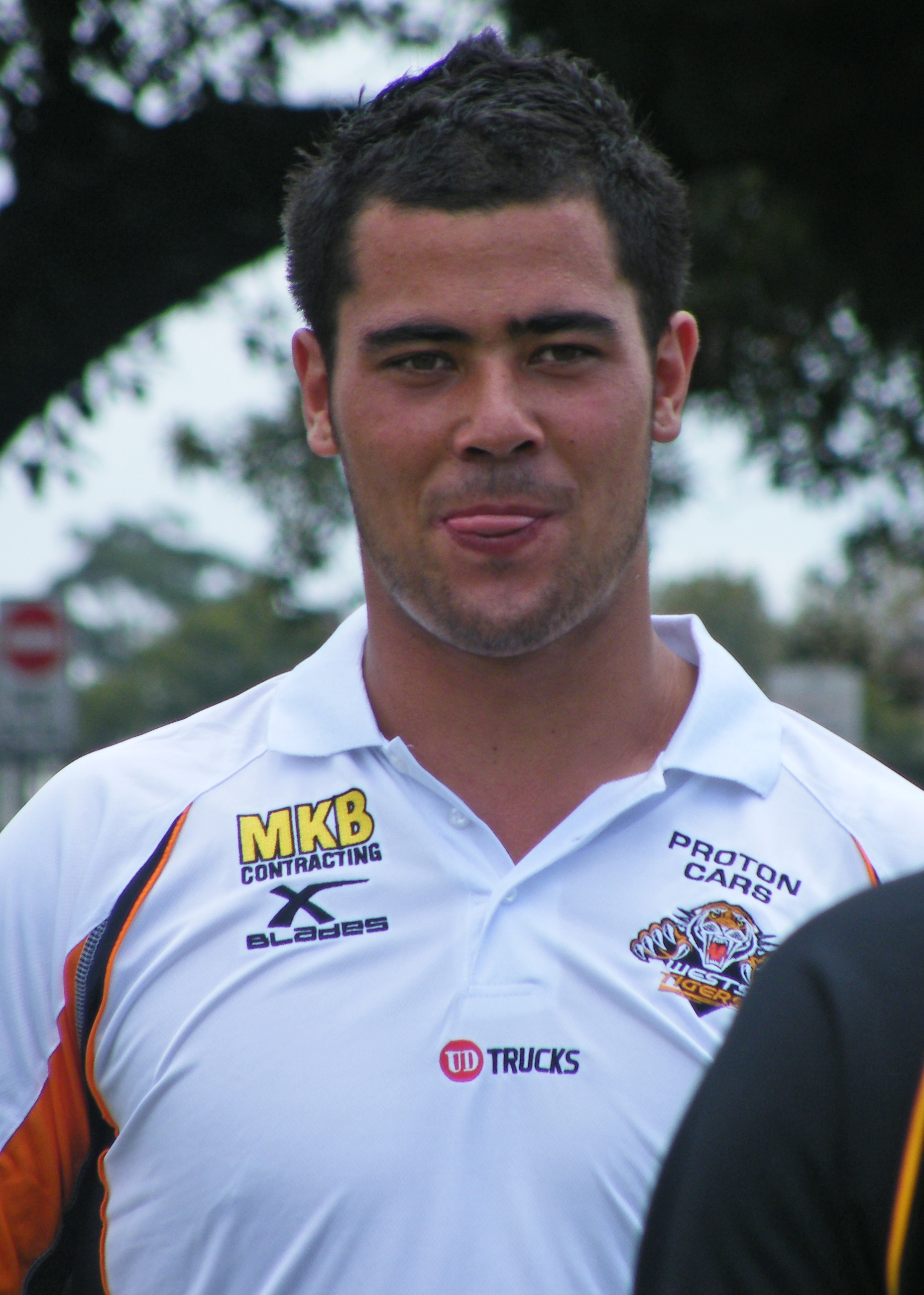
Fifita representing the Tigers in 2010

In round 2, Fifita made his first grade debut for the Wests Tigers against Sydney Roosters, coming off the interchange bench where he scored a try in the 44–32 loss at the Sydney Football Stadium. In round 23, against the Penrith Panthers, Fifita scored two tries in the Tigers 43–18 win at Campbelltown Stadium. Fifita finished his debut year in the NRL with 5 tries from 22 matches. On 25 October, Fifita made his international debut for Tonga, starting at prop in the 6–22 loss against Samoa at Parramatta Stadium. Fifita commented after match saying, "It was a good experience, it's not about the loss here, it's about the experience and about looking forward to the future for the World Cup and the years ahead."

=== 2011 ===
Fifita was chosen to participate in a New South Wales developmental squad. In the off-season he had dropped about 10 kilos to be playing at about 109 kg. Fifita started the season at prop, but was dropped from first grade by Tim Sheens after round 19 and never returned. "I was always saying, 'Let me play, let me play,'" Fifita said. "But he just said go to NSW Cup. I was pulling 80 minutes each game there, what can you do? You're up against the coach. You can't say anything. At the end I had kind of given up. I thought there was no more first grade for me."

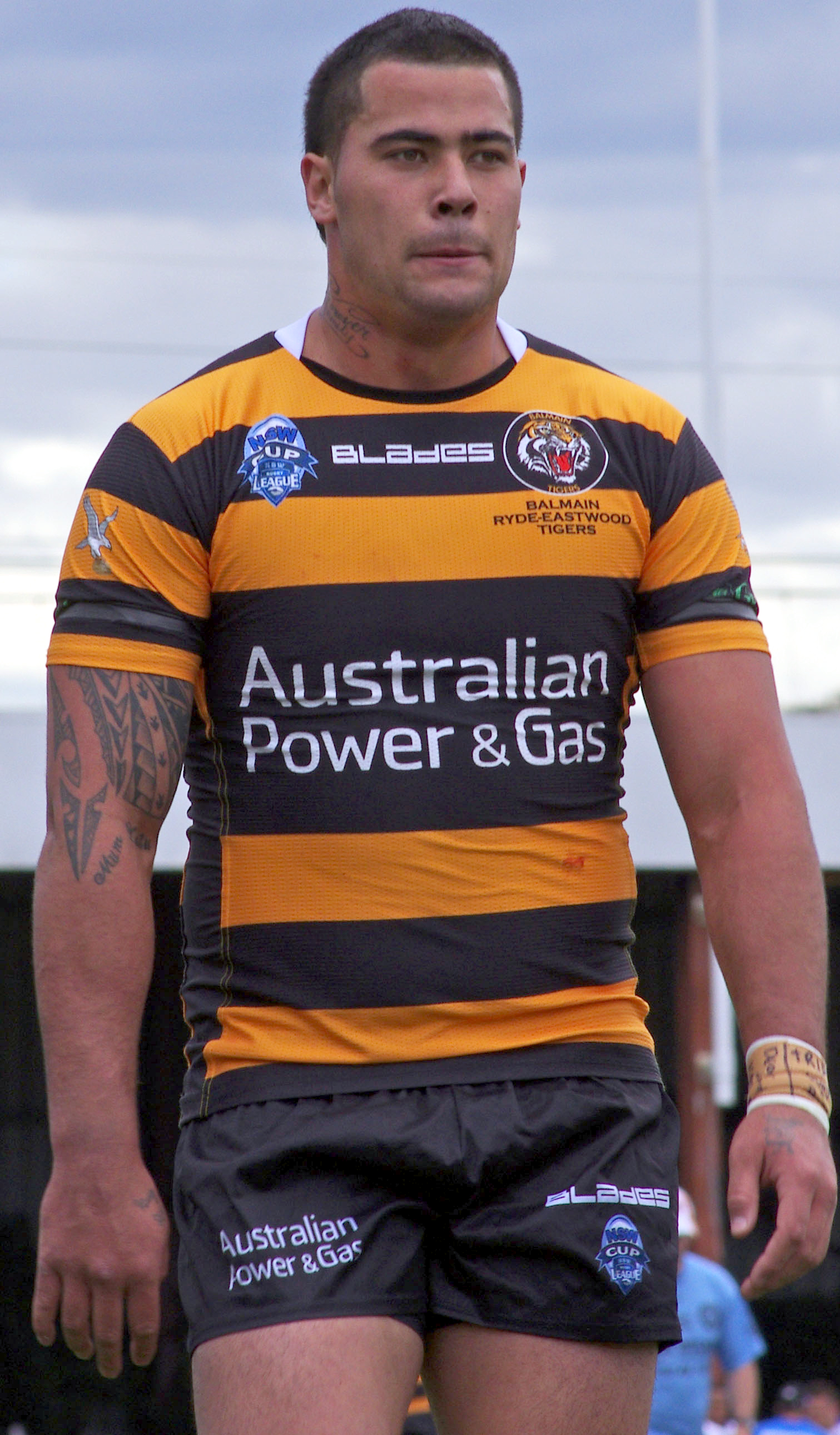
Fifita playing for the Tigers in 2011

On 15 July, Fifita signed with the Cronulla-Sutherland Sharks on a 3-year deal, starting from 2012 after was released from the Wests Tigers, along with Bryce Gibbs, so that the club could accommodate Adam Blair under the salary cap. Fifita finished his last year with the Wests Tigers with 3 tries in 17 matches.

=== 2012 ===
On 9 February, Fifita played for the Indigenous All Stars against the NRL All Stars, starting at prop in the 28–36 loss. In round 1, Fifita made his debut for the Cronulla-Sutherland Sharks against his former club, the Wests Tigers, playing off the interchange bench in the 16–17 loss at Leichhardt Oval. In round 4, against the North Queensland Cowboys, Fifita scored his first club try for the Sharks in the 20–14 win at 1300SMILES Stadium. With the Sharks starting 2012 well, and with his old club struggling to win early games, Fifita commented, "We have an unbelievable bond. We're so tight. Compared to the Tigers everyone is so tight. We have the same dressing rooms. It's just more of a friendship. We're all just brothers and it's no split groups, no nothing, it's who we are." Fifita finished his first year with the Sharks with him playing in 22 matches and scoring 5 tries.

=== 2013 ===
On 9 February, Fifita played for the Indigenous All Stars against the NRL All Stars, starting at prop in the 32–6 win. Fifita proved to be a revelation for the Sharks in the 2013 NRL season and was rewarded with representative selections for NSW City Origin and the New South Wales State of Origin teams. On 21 April, he played for City Origin against the NSW Country Origin side, where he played off the interchange bench and scored a try in the 12–18 loss. On 5 June, Fifita made his State of Origin debut for New South Wales against Queensland, where he played off the interchange bench in the Blues 14–6 win at ANZ Stadium. After continuing his good form for the Sharks and helping them to a 5th-place finish, Fifita was selected as the 2013 Dally M Prop of the year after being the Sharks highest tryscorer with 9 tries from 25 matches.

Fifita was chosen in the 24-man Australian squad for the 2013 Rugby League World Cup. On 26 October, he made his international debut for Australia against England where he played off the interchange bench in the 28–20 win at Millennium Stadium. In his third match for Australia, against Ireland, Fifita scored his first international try in the Kangaroos 50–0 win at Thomond Park. In the Kangaroos semi-final match against Fiji, Fifita scored the last try of the match in the 64–0 win. It was the last try ever described by BBC rugby league commentator Ray French. During the tournament, Fifita played in 6 matches and scored 2 tries for Australia, including playing off the interchange bench in the Kangaroos 34-2 World Cup win over New Zealand at Old Trafford.

=== 2014 ===
On 11 March, Fifita signed a four-year contract worth more than $800,000 a season to play with the Canterbury Bankstown Bulldogs. On 31 March, Fifita's contract with the Canterbury-Bankstown Bulldogs was terminated. A statement from the Bulldogs stated that they had advised Fifita's management that he would not be playing for the club "given the final terms of the NRL Playing Contract could not be agreed". Canterbury's management team were also reportedly upset with Fifita's comments days after signing with the club saying that "He wished he joined Rugby Union instead" and that his "heart was still with Cronulla". On 26 April, Fifita re-signed with Cronulla on a four-year deal until the end of the 2018 season. Fifita later made public the terms of the memorandum of understanding he had signed, which stated he would be paid $800,000 per season. When the official contract was received 17 days later, the figures were much lower, and only offered $375,000 for the first season. On 4 May, Fifita played for City against Country where he scored a try in the 26-all draw. In round 9, against the Parramatta Eels, Fifita suffered an ankle injury. The injury resulted in Fifita missing the 2014 State of Origin series, and a big chunk of the NRL season. Fifita returned in round 18, against the Newcastle Knights. In round 22, against the New Zealand Warriors, Fifita suffered a broken arm which ended his season. Fifita played in 12 matches during his tumultuous heavily publicised 2014 NRL season.

On 17 August, Fifita was involved in a road rage incident at Taren Point where he allegedly threw an object at a car travelling behind him and later after the pair pulled over, Fifita allegedly got out of his Jeep and verbally abused the 23-year-old male driver of the Subaru before punching and kicking the panels of his car.

=== 2015 ===
In round 2, against the Brisbane Broncos, Fifita played his 100th career match in the Sharks 2–10 loss at Shark Park. On 3 May, he played for City Origin in the 22–34 loss in Wagga Wagga. Fifita's good form in the early rounds of the season earned him a spot back into the New South Wales Blues team, where he played in game 1 of the series, coming off the interchange bench in the Blues 10–11 loss at ANZ Stadium. He wasn't selected for games 2 or 3.

On 6 August, Fifita and his twin brother David were given 6-week suspensions and a $30,000 fine after they abused a referee at a junior match in Penrith. The pair allegedly abused the referee because a player in the team they were helping out, St Patrick's Blacktown, was injured in back play and the referee didn't stop the match. During the suspension, on an episode of The Footy Show, Fifita discussed how he had suffered severe depression in October 2014 and attempted suicide by trying to hurl himself out of a 20th story window at a holiday resort at Surfers Paradise after a drunken night out with his brothers and friends celebrating a friend's bucks night. Fifita revealed that he had been saved when someone in the room grabbed his legs and pulled him back inside and said "David punched me in the face, punched me in the mouth, I sat there laughing at him", I was just yelling at him 'I don't care: it's over, do what you want.' Life was over for me at that point." Fifita had become suicidal amid the pressures of his team's poor results, a personal form slump and complications involving his contract. Following the incident, Andrew's brother David forced him to seek psychiatric help after which he received treatment for depression and a personality disorder. After his suspension was over, Fifita returned for the Sharks in their elimination finals match against the reigning premiers the South Sydney Rabbitohs, where he played off the interchange bench in the Sharks 28–12 win. Fifita finished the year with him playing in 18 matches and scoring 7 tries for the Sharks.

=== 2016 ===
On 13 February, Fifita played for the Indigenous All Stars against the World All Stars, starting at prop in the 12–8 loss at Suncorp Stadium. In September 2016, sports journalist Rebecca Wilson called for Fifita to be terminated by Cronulla after the player had visited convicted killer Kieran Loveridge in prison. Wilson later said that Fifita had no place in rugby league.

On 2 October, Fifita played for Cronulla-Sutherland against the Melbourne Storm in the 2016 NRL Grand Final, which Cronulla won 14–12 at ANZ Stadium in Sydney. He scored the winning try with ten minutes to go in the game, carrying several defenders over the line with him. His efforts in the 2016 season saw him co-winner of the Cronulla-Sutherland Sharks Player of the Year trophy at the clubs annual season awards night. On 13 December 2016, Fifita was handed a breach notice by The NRL for showing support for childhood friend, one punch killer Kieran Loveridge. Fifita attempted to reach out to the family of Thomas Kelly and was dismayed at how the incident was received.

On seven occasions Fifita was photographed playing with the message on his wrist during the Cronulla's premiership drought-breaking campaign. On 21 December 2016, Fifita was fined $20,000 by The NRL over his continued support for Loveridge.

=== 2017 ===
On 31 May 2017, Fifita played for the New South Wales Blues in game 1 of the 2017 State of Origin series and was instrumental in the team's 28–4 win over the Queensland Maroons. He fended multiple times to put James Maloney in under the posts, then made some runs. He took advantage of a loose ball from Justin O'Neill to score under the posts. Fifita was adjudged man of the match. During RLWC 2017, despite being named in the Australian team, Fifita opted to play for Tonga, and was instrumental in their most successful World Cup campaign to date, reaching the semi-finals. On 2 December 2017, it was revealed that Fifita was taking NRL club Canterbury to court over a contract dispute which was reportedly worth $3.2 million over 4 seasons.

=== 2018 ===
Fifita had a strong year in 2018. He captained the Sharks on occasion and was awarded the Dally M Prop of the Year. In November, it was revealed by The Daily Telegraph that Cronulla had lost their 3 main sponsors ahead of the 2019 season. According to the report, Cronulla were in talks with securing a major sponsor for the next five seasons equaling $6 million but the deal was cancelled due to Fifita and fellow Cronulla player Josh Dugan's antics during a podcast back in August 2018 when Fifita called Daily Telegraph sports columnist Phil Rothfield a "complete fuckwit" and Dugan calling Rothfield an "old, weathered and baldheaded idiot".

In the historic first ever rugby league Test between the Australian Kangaroos and Tonga, Fifita led the Tongan pre-match warcry, the sipi tau, in front of a sold-out crowd at Auckland's Mount Smart Stadium. The Kangaroos went on to win 36–14.

=== 2019 ===
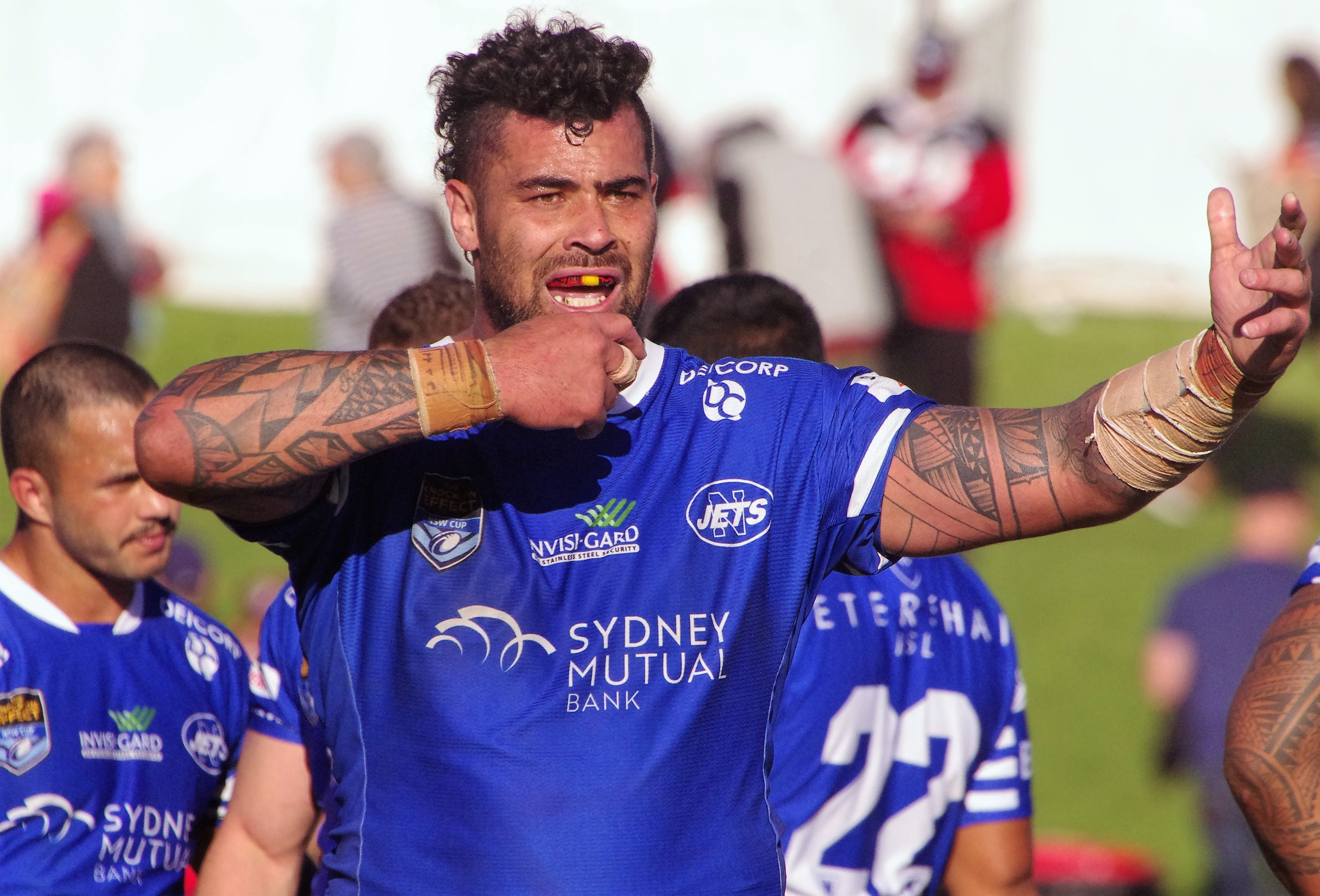
Fifita playing for the Newtown Jets in 2021

On 3 May, Fifita ruled out a return to play for New South Wales saying "The pinnacle of our game is to play for your country, And we've created something really good for international footy and I don't want it to drop off".

In Round 18 against the New Zealand Warriors, Fifita was sin binned with 10 minutes of play left after using an illegal shoulder charge on New Zealand player Lachlan Burr. New Zealand would go on to kick the subsequent penalty goal and then kicked a field goal to win the match 19–18. After the match, former NRL player Darren Lockyer branded Fifita "irresponsible" and "lazy".

At the end of the 2019 regular season, Cronulla finished in 7th spot and qualified for the finals. Fifita played in the club's elimination final defeat against Manly at Brookvale Oval.

=== 2020 ===
Fifita played 12 games for Cronulla in the 2020 NRL season as the club finished 8th and qualified for the finals. He played in Cronulla's elimination final loss against Canberra.

=== 2021 ===
Fifita started the season in the NSW Cup, playing for Cronulla's feeder club Newtown. In round 10 of the 2021 NRL season, he made his first appearance of the year for Cronulla against South Sydney.

In round 22 against Newcastle, Fifita was taken from the field in the first half of the match and later taken to hospital with a suspected throat injury, where he was diagnosed with a fractured larynx requiring surgery and placed into an induced coma.

=== 2022 ===
In round 17 of the 2022 NRL season, Fifita was sent to the sin bin for a dangerous tackle during Cronulla's 28-6 victory over Melbourne. On 23 August, Fifita announced he would be leaving Cronulla at the end of the 2022 season. Fifita played a total of 22 games for Cronulla throughout 2022 including both of the clubs finals matches. Fifita's final game for Cronulla was their elimination final loss to South Sydney. In November, Fifita announced his retirement.

== Post playing ==
After retiring from the NRL, Fifita completed a diploma of counselling.

On 30 January 2025, Fifita was announced as the coach for the Tarsha Gale Under 19s squad. On 12 November 2025, the Sharks confirmed that Fifita would return as coach for the 2026 Tarsha Gale Cup season.

== Statistics ==
=== NRL ===
Season	Team	Matches	T	G	GK %	F/G	Pts
2010	Wests Tigers	22	5	0	—	0	20
2011	Wests Tigers	17	3	0	—	0	12
2012	Cronulla-Sutherland	22	5	0	—	0	20
2013	Cronulla-Sutherland	25	9	0	—	0	36
2014	Cronulla-Sutherland	12	0	0	—	0	0
2015	Cronulla-Sutherland	18	7	0	—	0	28
2016	Cronulla-Sutherland	25	3	0	—	0	12
2017	Cronulla-Sutherland	23	1	0	—	0	4
2018	Cronulla-Sutherland	26	3	0	—	0	12
2019	Cronulla-Sutherland	21	2	0	—	0	8
2020	Cronulla-Sutherland	12	1	0	—	0	4
2021	Cronulla-Sutherland	6	0	0	—	0	0
2022	Cronulla-Sutherland	22	1	0	—	0	4
Career totals		252	40	0	—	0	160

=== All Star ===
Season	Team	Matches	T	G	GK %	F/G	Pts
2012	Indigenous All Stars	1	0	0	—	0	0
2013	Indigenous All Stars	1	0	0	—	0	0
2016	Indigenous All Stars	1	0	0	—	0	0
2017	Indigenous All Stars	1	0	0	—	0	0
2019	Indigenous All Stars	1	0	0	—	0	0
2022	Indigenous All Stars	1	0	0	—	0	0
Career totals		6	0	0	—	0	0

=== City vs Country ===
Season	Team	Matches	T	G	GK %	F/G	Pts
2013	NSW City	1	1	0	—	0	4
2014	NSW City	1	1	0	—	0	4
2015	NSW City	1	0	0	—	0	0
Career totals		3	2	0	—	0	8

=== State of Origin ===
Season	Team	Matches	T	G	GK %	F/G	Pts
2013	New South Wales	3	0	0	—	0	0
2015	New South Wales	1	0	0	—	0	0
2016	New South Wales	3	1	0	—	0	4
2017	New South Wales	3	1	0	—	0	4
Career totals		10	2	0	—	0	8

=== International ===
Season	Team	Matches	T	G	GK %	F/G	Pts
2010	Tonga	1	0	0	—	0	0
2013	Australia	6	2	0	—	0	8
2017	Australia	1	0	0	—	0	0
2017	Tonga	5	0	0	—	0	0
2018	Tonga	2	0	0	—	0	0
2019	Tonga Invitational	2	0	0	—	0	0
Career totals		17	2	0	—	0	8
