= Kevin Jousset =

French mixed martial artist (born 1993)

- Born: 2 May 1993 (age 33); Bordeaux, France
- Other names: Air
- Height: 6 ft 2 in (1.88 m)
- Weight: 170.5 lb (77 kg; 12 st 3 lb)
- Division: Welterweight (2019–2022, 2023–present); Middleweight (2022–2023)
- Reach: 75 in (191 cm)
- Fighting out of: Auckland, New Zealand
- Team: Absolute MMA (2016–2020); City Kickboxing (main) (2020–present); Boxing Squad (secondary) (2024–present)
- Trainer: Eugene Bareman
- Rank: 2nd dan black belt in Judo; Purple belt in Brazilian Jiu-Jitsu
- Years active: 2019–present

Mixed martial arts record
- Total: 15
- Wins: 10
- By knockout: 4
- By submission: 1
- By decision: 5
- Losses: 5
- By knockout: 3
- By decision: 2

Amateur record
- Total: 3
- Wins: 3
- By knockout: 3

Other information
- Website: airjousset.com
- Mixed martial arts record from Sherdog

Kevin Jousset (born 2 May 1993) is a French professional mixed martial artist, who competed in the Welterweight division in the Ultimate Fighting Championship (UFC), receiving a 2-2 record in the promotion. A professional competitor since 2019, Jousset formerly competed for the Hex Fight Series in Australia, where he has been the first simultaneous double Welterweight and Middleweight Champion.

== Early life ==
Kevin Jousset was born on 2 May 1993 in Bordeaux, France and then quickly moved with his family to Gap where he grew up. Jousset started judo as a child and received his 2nd dan black belt at the age of 14. He pursued his judo career along with other French prospects at the Rennes Academy and Bordeaux France Academy before moving to Paris and joining INEF and INSEP.

Unfortunately, he had to stop his career after a serious shoulder injury and chose to spend one year and a half in Scotland for learning English at the age of 21. Two years later, he moved to Melbourne, Australia in November 2016 where he got a fitness coach diploma and started mixed martial arts.

== Mixed martial arts career ==
=== Early years ===
Jousset quickly joined Absolute MMA in Melbourne where he met former UFC Featherweight Champion Alexander Volkanovski and elite grappler Craig Jones. He stayed there for four years and prepared his first fights with the team. After a few amateur wins, he made his professional debut in March 2019 at Hex Fight Series 18 and went on to win the bout via knockout with a knee strike in the first round. For his third professional fight, he lost against Jack Della Maddalena on 4 October at Eternal MMA 48 for the EMMA Welterweight Championship after a doctor stoppage at the end of round 2. He then settled down in Auckland, New Zealand in January 2020 and joined City Kickboxing where he made a training camp the previous year.

In 2023, he became the first fighter ever to become a two-division champion in the Australian elite MMA promotion HEX Fight Series after winning the HEX Vacant Middleweight Belt in February and then the HEX Welterweight Belt in May.

=== Ultimate Fighting Championship ===
In August 2023, Jousset signed with the Ultimate Fighting Championship (UFC) after becoming the first HEX double champion. His City Kickboxing teammate and friend, former two-time UFC Middleweight Champion Israel Adesanya as well as his coach Eugene Bareman recommended to the UFC staff to sign him after Jousset's progress and dominance in training. On 10 September 2023, he made his promotional debut against Irish fighter Kiefer Crosbie at UFC 293 in Sydney, Australia and won by submitting him with a rear-naked choke at the end of round one. Following his fast win, he called out fellow UFC Welterweight Ian Machado Garry in an attempt to continue the theme of defeating Irish fighters.

Jousset faced Song Kenan on 9 December at UFC Fight Night 233. He won the fight via unanimous decision with all three judges scoring 30–27 for the Frenchman. For his third bout in the UFC, he was scheduled to face Jared Gooden on 11 May 2024 at UFC on ESPN 56. However, for medical reasons, Gooden was unable to compete and the bout was cancelled. Since January 2024, Jousset partly trains at Manon Fiorot's team Boxing Squad in Nice when he goes back to France for short or medium stays.

Jousset faced Bryan Battle on 28 September 2024 at UFC Fight Night 243. He lost the fight by technical knockout in the second round.

Jousset faced Jonathan Micallef on February 9, 2025, at UFC 312. He lost the fight by unanimous decision.

On April 29, 2025, it was reported that Jousset was removed from the UFC roster.

=== Professional Fighters League ===
Jousset was scheduled to face Abdoul Abdouraguimov on September 26, 2025, at PFL Europe 3. However, Abdouraguimov withdrew from the event due to personal reasons and the bout was cancelled.

Jousset faced Patrick Habirora on December 13, 2025, at PFL Lyon: Nemkov vs. Ferreira. He lost the fight via knockout in round one.

== Championships and accomplishments ==
=== Mixed martial arts ===
- Hex Fight Series
  - First ever HEX double champion
    - HEX Welterweight Championship (One time)
    - HEX Middleweight Championship (One time)

== Mixed martial arts record ==
Professional record breakdown
| 15 matches | 10 wins | 5 losses |
| By knockout | 4 | 3 |
| By submission | 1 | 0 |
| By decision | 5 | 2 |

| Res. | Record | Opponent | Method | Event | Date | Round | Time | Location | Notes |
|---|---|---|---|---|---|---|---|---|---|
| Loss | 10–5 | Patrick Habirora | KO (punches) | PFL Lyon: Nemkov vs. Ferreira | December 13, 2025 | 1 | 2:42 | Décines-Charpieu, France | |
| Loss | 10–4 | Jonathan Micallef | Decision (unanimous) | UFC 312 | February 9, 2025 | 3 | 5:00 | Sydney, Australia | |
| Loss | 10–3 | Bryan Battle | TKO (punches) | UFC Fight Night: Moicano vs. Saint Denis | September 28, 2024 | 2 | 3:47 | Paris, France | |
| Win | 10–2 | Song Kenan | Decision (unanimous) | UFC Fight Night: Song vs. Gutiérrez | December 9, 2023 | 3 | 5:00 | Las Vegas, Nevada, United States | |
| Win | 9–2 | Kiefer Crosbie | Submission (rear-naked choke) | UFC 293 | September 10, 2023 | 1 | 4:49 | Sydney, Australia | |
| Win | 8–2 | Kitt Campbell | TKO (punches) | Hex Fight Series 26 | May 26, 2023 | 3 | 4:53 | Melbourne, Australia | Return to Welterweight. Won the HEX Welterweight Championship. |
| Win | 7–2 | Priscus Fogagnolo | Decision (split) | Hex Fight Series 25 | February 24, 2023 | 5 | 5:00 | Melbourne, Australia | Won the vacant HEX Middleweight Championship. |
| Win | 6–2 | James Craughwell | Decision (unanimous) | Shuriken Fight Series 13 | December 10, 2022 | 3 | 5:00 | Auckland, New Zealand | Middleweight debut. |
| Loss | 5–2 | Kaleb Rideout | Decision (split) | Eternal MMA 67 | July 16, 2022 | 5 | 5:00 | Gold Coast, Australia | For the vacant Eternal MMA Welterweight Championship. |
| Win | 5–1 | Saeed Fatahifar | Decision (majority) | Eternal MMA 59 | May 7, 2021 | 3 | 5:00 | Melbourne, Australia | |
| Win | 4–1 | Paul McMah | TKO (knee and punches) | Shuriken Fight Series 9 | March 26, 2021 | 1 | 2:39 | Auckland, New Zealand | |
| Win | 3–1 | Mat Myers | Decision (unanimous) | Hex Fight Series 20 | December 13, 2019 | 3 | 5:00 | Melbourne, Australia | |
| Loss | 2–1 | Jack Della Maddalena | TKO (doctor stoppage) | Eternal MMA 48 | October 4, 2019 | 2 | 5:00 | Melbourne, Australia | For the Eternal MMA Welterweight Championship. |
| Win | 2–0 | James O'Brien | TKO (elbows) | Eternal MMA 45 | May 25, 2019 | 1 | 2:32 | Southport, Australia | |
| Win | 1–0 | Sam McNally | KO (knee) | Hex Fight Series 18 | March 29, 2019 | 1 | 1:01 | Melbourne, Australia | Welterweight debut. |

=== Amateur record ===
| Amateur record breakdown | | |
| 2 matches | 2 wins | 0 losses |
| By knockout | 1 | 0 |
| Unknown | 1 | 0 |

| Res. | Record | Opponent | Method | Event | Date | Round | Time | Location | Notes |
|---|---|---|---|---|---|---|---|---|---|
| Win | 2–0 | Marc Luty | KO (slam) | Eternal MMA 38 | October 27, 2018 | 1 | 2:17 | Findon, Australia | |
| Win | 1–0 | Jayden Groen | —N/a | Path to Hex 6 | September 22, 2018 | —N/a | —N/a | Melbourne, Australia | |

== See also ==
- List of male mixed martial artists
