= Death of Patrick Cronin =

2016 incident in Melbourne, Australia

Pat Cronin
- Born: Patrick John Cronin; 24 September 1996; Bundoora, Victoria, Australia
- Died: 18 April 2016 (aged 19); Royal Melbourne Hospital, Victoria, Australia
- Cause of death: Acute extra-dural haemorrhage following blunt force trauma (coward punch)
- Education: Whitefriars College; La Trobe University
- Parents: Matt Cronin (father); Robyn Cronin (mother)
- Website: Pat Cronin Foundation

Patrick John Cronin (24 September 1996 – 18 April 2016) was a 19-year-old Australian man who died following a brawl at the Windy Mile Hotel in Diamond Creek, Victoria in 2016. Cronin was killed by a single strike to the back of his head (described as a coward punch) while he attempted to pull his friend out of the fight.

It is believed the brawl involved up to thirty individuals, several of whom were charged in relation to the brawl. The main offender, Andrew William Lee, pleaded guilty to the manslaughter of Cronin and received a prison term of eight years with a five-year non-parole period. Following his sentencing, Lee sought to appeal his original sentence twice but was refused. In addition to his sentence, Lee was ordered to pay Cronin's family $170,972 by the Supreme Court of Victoria following a compensation claim by Cronin's family.

Of the other individuals who were charged in relation to Cronin's death, one had his charge dismissed, two received a criminal conviction and had to pay fines of $2,000 and $3,000, two were offered diversions, and one was ordered to be of good behaviour and make a $2,000 donation to the Pat Cronin Foundation. Cronin's family set up the foundation which aims to end the coward punch and educate people on the consequences of violence. The foundation presents its "Be Wise Education Program" to school students across Victoria in an effort to promote responsible decision-making from a young age.

== Circumstances of death ==
On 16 April 2016 at 9:45 p.m., Patrick Cronin met with friends at the bar of the Windy Mile Hotel in Diamond Creek, Victoria, Australia. Earlier in the day, Cronin and his older brother Lucas had both played their first senior match at their local football club. Andrew Lee arrived at the hotel at 10:21 p.m. and proceeded to have a few drinks with his friends.

At around 11 p.m., a fight broke out just outside the hotel after a man named Joseph Hitchcock confronted a group of four patrons who yelled "fuck off, you fatty" to him. Shortly thereafter, Patrick Cronin was seen on CCTV to have left his seat at the bar and proceeded outside to where the fight was taking place. He was seen trying to remove his friend, Anthony Hopkins, from the brawl. Lee also proceeded outside to the location of the altercation and watched for approximately a minute before deciding to get involved. Lee approached the brawl, out of Cronin's view, towards his right side. Lee threw three punches, all of which were aimed at Cronin's friend, Hopkins. The first punch struck the right side of Hopkins' head, the second punch struck Cronin near his ear (the force of the blow caused Cronin to stumble sideways), and the third punch did not strike anyone. From that point, Lee continued to engage in the brawl while Cronin removed Hopkins and other friends from the area.

Police arrived at the hotel soon afterwards; the brawl subsided, and the participants scattered. Cronin explained to friends that he had been punched on the right of his head and could be seen rubbing the area on CCTV. Cronin then left the hotel to stay at a friend's house; he complained of a headache and feeling unwell during the rest of the evening. By 12:30 a.m., Cronin's condition had become considerably worse, and he was found vomiting in the bathroom by Hopkins. Cronin said that he suspected he had a concussion. At around 1 a.m., Cronin's mother, Robyn Cronin, was called to pick him up due to his poor condition. As his condition further deteriorated, Cronin began convulsing and suffered a seizure; an ambulance was called. By the time paramedics arrived, Cronin was unconscious. The MICA staff had to intervene in order to assist Cronin's breathing and to stabilise his condition for the trip to the hospital. Upon his arrival at the Royal Melbourne Hospital, doctors determined that Cronin "suffered a significant haemorrhage on the right side of his brain" and that the "injury was not survivable".

Cronin died at 8:25 p.m. on 18 April 2016 from what was described as an "acute extra-dural haemorrhage following blunt force trauma." A post mortem was conducted by forensic pathologist Yeliena Baber. She concluded that Cronin had been struck at the "weakest point of the skull", only four millimetres (0.16 in) thick. She described the area as the "achilles tendon of the skull." She reported that the punch Cronin suffered caused a two-centimetre (0.79 in) hairline fracture in his skull and it was a "lacerated artery that produced the haemorrhage."

== Criminal proceedings ==
Police suspected that as many as thirty individuals were engaged in the altercation that took Cronin's life; ultimately, charges were filed against seven individuals involved in the brawl.

=== Andrew William Lee ===
On 19 April 2016, police released an image of "a man they would like to speak to," the following day, Lee turned himself in, was arrested, and charged with Cronin's murder. In May 2017, Lee's initial charge of murder was downgraded to the lesser charge of manslaughter. On 8 September 2017, Lee pleaded guilty to one charge of manslaughter in relation to his involvement in the brawl. His plea of guilty occurred one day after his trial had started and with a jury already being empanelled.

On 10 November 2017, in sentencing Lee, Justice Lex Lasry concluded that despite the seriousness of Lee's actions, several factors helped mitigate the imposed sentence. The judge cited Lee's plea of guilty (which spared the Cronin family from the trauma involved with a trial), his remorse for his actions, previous good character, and good prospects for rehabilitation. Lasry sentenced Lee to eight years' imprisonment, fixed with a five-year non-parole period, for the manslaughter of Cronin. Lee made two attempts to appeal against his sentence, but both failed. On the first occasion, in March 2018, the matter was refused by a justice of the Court of Appeal. On the second occasion, in December 2018, the matter was refused by three Court of Appeal justices.

In 2019, Lee was ordered to pay $170,972 in compensation to Cronin's family after they sought financial compensation for Lee's actions. In Victoria, all victims of crime are able to seek compensation from offenders through the Sentencing Act 1991; however, the process is costly, complex, and lengthy. In August 2018, it was revealed that Lee had been speaking to VCE legal studies students as part of a Corrections Victoria education program. While the program had existed for twenty years, Cronin's father raised concerns and others that students were receiving talks from someone guilty of manslaughter and that there was the potential for Lee to meet with someone who may have known Cronin. Following a furore, Lee was removed from the program.

=== Other charges ===
Aron John Burns, a man who had a prior criminal conviction for "intentionally causing injury", was convicted of unlawfully flighting and affray and fined $2,000 after pleading guilty.

Gerrard O'Connor had his charge dismissed after pleading not guilty. O'Connor claimed he was acting in self-defence despite admitting to punching co-accused Samuel Judd in the face. Magistrate Lance Martin acquitted O'Connor after concluding that his actions were necessary in the course of protecting his friend, who was also involved in the brawl.

Joseph Hitchcock, the man involved in the inception of the fight, was charged over his actions in the brawl, which included criminal damage for breaking the phone of a person who was recording the incident and affray. Hitchcock pleaded guilty to both charges. Showing remorse and with no prior convictions, Hitchcock received a $4,000 fine and a criminal conviction.

Luke Sheahan, whose involvement in the fight lasted 12 seconds, pleaded guilty to affray. Sheahan received a 12-month good behaviour bond and was ordered to donate $2,000 to the Pat Cronin Foundation.

Samuel Judd was charged in relation to the matter and was offered a diversion.

Simon Jeffrey Buchanan, with no prior convictions, was offered a diversion, ordered to donate $2,000 to the Pat Cronin Foundation and be of good behaviour after he pleaded guilty to unlawfully fighting and affray. He did not receive a criminal conviction.

Wayne Gilbert McManus, a man who had "two relevant prior convictions", was found guilty, received a $3,000 fine, and a criminal conviction after pleading not guilty and claiming he "acted in defence of others" as he attempted to break up smaller fights within the brawl.

== Legacy ==
=== Pat Cronin Foundation ===
Roughly two years after his death, Cronin's family launched a foundation in his honour to educate, raise awareness and conduct research in relation to the coward punch. The foundation has received hundreds of thousands of dollars in Victorian state government funding directed at the rollout of the Be Wise Education Program across 200 schools. The program promotes good decision-making and the dangers of social violence to students, with the ultimate goal being to end the coward punch. In addition to the presentations that are run throughout the year, the Foundation hosts events such as the Be Wise Ball and the Be Wise Walk to the Valley where people walk from Heidelberg to Lower Plenty in memory of Cronin. The foundation's symbol, an owl, was drawn by Cronin shortly before his passing and has since been used as a symbol for Be Wise.

=== Proposed law reforms ===
Cronin's family has been vocal in their desire for new laws in dealing with coward punch cases and victim's rights. This has included a call for crime compensation law reform. They describe the process for victims of crime to access compensation from an offender as very onerous, consuming a lot of time and money. Cronin's family argue that even after being ordered to pay compensation, the offender may decide to ignore the order, which then requires the victim to pursue the matter in a civil lawsuit. Cronin's father has suggested that an order of compensation be imposed at the time of sentencing as an alternative.

Legislation introduced in 2014 that imposed a ten-year mandatory minimum sentence for manslaughter as a result of a coward punch was unable to be applied in Lee's case after Justice Lasry determined that Lee's intention to strike Cronin could not be proven. As a result, Cronin's family has called for the current legislation to be reformed, labelling it "poor and ambiguous" as the mandatory sentence is difficult to apply to manslaughter cases (as proving manslaughter does not require proof of intent).

== See also ==
- Sucker punch
- Crime in Victoria
- Death of Thomas Kelly
- Rabbit punch

== Sources ==
- Lasry, Lex (10 November 2017). "R v Lee [2017] VSC 678". BarNet Jade. Supreme Court of Victoria. Archived from the original on 18 January 2023.
