= Sucker punch =

Type of punch

A sucker punch (American English), also known as a cheap shot, one-punch attack, and coward punch or king-hit (Australian English and New Zealand English), is a punch thrown at the recipient unprovoked without warning, allowing no time for preparation or defense on their end. The term is generally used in situations where the way in which the punch has been delivered is considered unfair or unethical, and is done using deception, distraction, or just surprise.

In boxing, a sucker punch—as is done when 'hitting on the break'—is illegal. For example, when James Butler knocked Richard Grant unconscious after losing a fight to him on points, his license was suspended and he served four months in prison. It is often thrown from behind—such as in the 'knockout game'—although striking from behind is not a prerequisite for a sucker punch. In 2021, notable figures in the MMA community, such as UFC middleweight champion Israel Adesanya and City Kickboxing head coach Eugene Bareman, called for legal changes and 'coward punch laws'. In 2014, New South Wales, Queensland and Victoria all introduced such laws.

== As a crime ==
=== Australia ===
Between 2012 and 2014, significant media attention was paid to two violent killings involving one-hit punches in Australia, one of which being the death of Thomas Kelly. Noting that 91 people had died in Australia in the previous fourteen years from brain trauma as a result of being hit, a media campaign was launched to refer to them as coward punches. This campaign was supported by the New South Wales Government.

Following the deaths of two teenagers from "one punch" assaults, New South Wales Premier Barry O'Farrell announced in January 2014 that the state would introduce new legislation to toughen sentences against drunken violence including "coward punch" assaults. These measures include minimum eight-year sentences for fatal one-punch assaults influenced by drugs or alcohol. The Crimes and Other Legislation Amendment (Assault and Intoxication) Act 2014 amended the Crimes Act 1900 to introduce a new offence: "Assault Causing Death." Under sections 25A and 25B of the Crimes Act, intoxicated offenders convicted of assault causing death can face a minimum jail term of eight years and a maximum jail term of 25 years. In addition, Law Enforcement (Powers and Responsibilities) Act 2002 was amended to allow for the testing of offenders charged with assault causing death for intoxication. In December 2017, a Sydney man named Hugh Garth became the first person to be sentenced under the new "one punch" law to ten years for an assault causing death in 2014.

In addition, other one-punch laws were introduced in Victoria and Queensland in 2014. In August 2014, the Queensland Parliament passed the Safe Night Legislation Amendment Bill 2014 which amends the Criminal Code that introduces a 15-year minimum term for those convicted of fatal one-punch attacks. In September 2014, the Victorian government introduced the Sentencing Amendment (Coward's Punch Manslaughter and Other Matters) Bill 2014 that treats one-punch attacks as manslaughter subject to a ten-year minimum sentence.

In February 2018, Home Affairs Minister Peter Dutton ordered the deportation of New Zealander Caleb Maraku using a character test provision of the Migration Act 1958. Maraku had been convicted of a one punch attack against another youth in Queensland's Gold Coast in November 2017; receiving a 12-month probationary sentence for assault and being ordered to pay a A$361 fine. He was also discharged without conviction. Maraku's perceived lenient sentence and insensitive post-sentencing behaviour had drawn significant media attention and public criticism. Australian boxer Kerry Foley had challenged Maraku to fight while a petition calling for his deportation attracted 50,000 signatures. Commenting on Maraku's deportation, Dutton said:

"It's no different to being invited into somebody's home - you don't start assaulting the residents of that house, you don't start assaulting Australian citizens and if you do you are shown the door."

=== New Zealand ===
In September 2018, National Party Member of Parliament Matt King submitted his Crimes (Coward Punch Causing Death) Amendment Bill, which would have created a 20-year prison term for one-punch attacks causing deaths. The bill was debated on 17 June 2020 but was defeated due to opposition from the incumbent Labour-led coalition government, which contended that New Zealand already had legislation dealing with one-punch attacks. Following the defeat of the Coward Punch Amendment Bill, King launched a "One Punch Can Kill campaign" to promote "one punch" legislation based on the New South Wales law. This campaign was supported by professional boxer Joseph Parker and his trainer Kevin Barry.

Following a one punch attack on mixed martial artist Fau Vake in May 2021, fellow mixed martial artist Israel Adesanya called for the introduction of legislation dealing with one punch attacks in New Zealand. Following Vake's death from his injuries, the conservative justice advocacy group Sensible Sentencing Trust sponsored a petition calling for tougher laws dealing with "one punch" attacks.

In early February 2024, National Party MP Paulo Garcia introduced a member's bill that would seek to amend the Crimes Act 1961 to specifically criminalise acts of "coward punching" leading to serious injuries or death. His member's bill was endorsed by mixed martial artist Adesanya.

On 30 June 2025, Paul Goldsmith Justice Minister confirmed that the National Government would introduce specific coward punching legislation as part of the National Party's coalition agreement with New Zealand First. New Zealand First campaigned on a similar law in the 2020 election. On 6 August 2026, Parliament passed legislation amending the Crimes Act 1961 to include new offenses for injuring or manslaughter via "coward punching."

=== United States ===
The term "sucker punch" was widely discussed after the New York Jets' starting quarterback, Geno Smith, was sucker punched by a fellow player, IK Enemkpali, on August 11, 2015. The altercation was in the locker room about compensation regarding a $600 airplane ticket.
