= Hemi Ahio =

New Zealand and Tongan boxer (born 1990)

- Born: John Kevin Alipate Ahio; 20 July 1990 (age 36); Mt Albert, New Zealand
- Other names: John Kevin (Kickboxing); The Heat (Nickname)
- Nationality: New Zealand; Tonga
- Height: 183 cm (6 ft 0 in)
- Weight: 115.9 kg (256 lb; 18 st 4 lb)
- Division: Heavyweight; Bridgerweight
- Reach: 185 cm (72.8 in)
- Team: City Kickboxing

Professional boxing record
- Total: 27
- Wins: 25
- By knockout: 19
- Losses: 2
- By knockout: 1

Kickboxing record
- Total: 1
- Losses: 1
- By knockout: 1

Other information
- Boxing record from BoxRec

John Kevin Alipate Ahio (born 20 July 1990), known professionally as Hemi Ahio, is a New Zealand-born Tongan professional boxer.

Ahio is a former WBC Middle East heavyweight title holder. He is a two-time New Zealand national heavyweight champion, being the first person to hold two New Zealand heavyweight titles from two commissioning bodies including NZNBF and PBCNZ. He was the first IBO Oceania-Oriental heavyweight champion.

== Early life and inspirations ==
Ahio was born and raised in Auckland, New Zealand by Tongan parents. He was introduced to boxing in 2012 by his uncle, after Ahio was attacked and stabbed by a group of men while waiting for a bus. Due to his height and ferocity he has been compared to a young Mike Tyson, sometimes earning him the nickname the 'Tongan Tyson'. He was inspired by New Zealand Samoan Heavyweight David Tua, and Tongan Legend Kitone Lave.

== Professional boxing ==
=== Professional debut to New Zealand champion 2013–2017 ===
Ahio made his professional boxing debut in 2013 where he stopped Clint Foai in the first round. At this time Ahio was trained by Lolo Heimuli. Ahio made his professional boxing debut in June 2014 when he defeated Will Quarrie by unanimous decision on the undercard of the inaugural Super 8 Boxing Tournament. Around this time is where Hemi Ahio signed a long-term deal with John McRae, promoter of the Super 8 tournament series.

Ahio next broadcast fight is on the third Super 8 event undercard in 2015 where he took on the American Clarence Tillman. Ahio would win the fight with Tillman retiring in corner from Shoulder dislocation. Ahio would fight again in May 2015 against journeyman Junior Maletino Iakopo. Ahio won the fight by Unanimous Decision, fighting through the fight with a hand injury. In August 2015, Ahio had his first international fight, in Australia, on a Danny Green undercard against Andre Meunier. Ahio won the first by first-round knockout. Ahio would return to the Super 8 events on TV when he takes on American Samoan boxer Alapati A'asa for the vacant New Zealand National (NZNBF version) Heavyweight title to end his 2015. After both boxers gets knocked down during the fight, Ahio won the fight by second-round TKO, picking up his first title.

Due to his promoter losing major sponsors earlier in the year, Ahio was not able to keep active. Ahio wasn't able to fight on other cards due to contract obligations to the former promoter. The contract however expired in 2018. Ahio would make his return in 2017 where he took on Daniel Tai for the vacant IBO Oceania Orient Heavyweight title and vacant New Zealand National (PBCNZ version) Heavyweight title. This will be the last fight Ahio would be fight under his trainer Lolo Heimuli and his promoter John McRae. Ahio would win the fight by unanimous decision picking up his second and third titles.

=== Fighting around the world, regional champion 2018–present ===
In November 2018, Ahio made his in ring return with a new trainer and away from the old promoter. Alongside Junior Fa, Hemi Ahio started training at City Kickboxing under Eugene Bareman and Doug Viney. Mark Keddell who had been Ahio's regular matchmaker since 2015, now became his co-manager. Ahio would make his American debut in March 2019 where he took on Ed Fountain. Ahio would win the fight by seventh round stoppage. At the end of March 2019, Ahio took on American boxer and the tallest boxer in the world Julius Long on the Geovana Peres vs Lani Daniels WBO World Light Heavyweight title fight undercard. Ahio won the fight by unanimous decision. Ahio will continue to have more fights overseas, making his Middle East Debut when he fought undefeated Ali Kiydin in July 2019. Hemi Ahio won the fight by first-round knockout. Ahio returned to America when he fought American Joshua Tufte. Ahio won the fight by second round stoppage.

Due to the Covid Pandemic, Ahio was not able to fight in 2020. During 2021, he was able to secure a WBC ranking in the Bridgerweight division, reaching 25th on the Bridgerweight rankings. In February 2021, Ahio fought in a rematch against Julius Long. Ahio won the fight by seventh-round knockout. In October 2021, Ahio fought in the Middle East for the second time, taking on Mohammad Ali Bayat Farid for the inaugural WBC Middle East Heavyweight title. Ahio won the fight by second-round TKO picking up his first major international title. In his time away from the ring, Ahio would peak on the WBC rankings in the heavyweight division reaching 35th. Ahio returned to the ring in June 2022. Originally his opponent was scheduled to be Joe Jones, however due to a last minute pull out, Ahio took on Christian Ndzie Tsoye. Ahio won the fight by stoppage as his opponent retired in the corner between rounds due to injury.

Ahio beat former Commonwealth heavyweight champion Lucas Browne by first-round stoppage at the RAC Arena in Perth, Australia, on 12 May 2024.

== Kickboxing ==
On 23 December 2016, Ahio fought in his one and only kickboxing fight under the name of John Kevin in Emei, China. Ahio took on experienced kickboxer Julius Mocka in the 100 kg+ division at EM Legend event "EM Legend 15 - End of Year Finals Emei" at Emei Shan Gymnasium. Ahio lost the fight by first-round knockout.

== Professional boxing titles ==
- New Zealand National Boxing Federation
  - New Zealand National Heavyweight Title (2015)
- Professional Boxing Commission New Zealand
  - New Zealand National Heavyweight Title (2017)
- International Boxing Organisation
  - IBO Oceania-Oriental Heavyweight Title (2017)
- World Boxing Council
  - WBC Middle East Heavyweight Title (2021)

== Professional boxing record ==
27 fights	25 wins	2 losses
By knockout	19	2
By decision	6	0

No.	Result	Record	Opponent	Type	Round, time	Date	Location	Notes
27	Loss	25−2	Teremoana Teremoana	TKO	2 (10), 1:36	18 Nov 2026	Pullman Hotel Albert Park, Melbourne, Australia	For vacant IBF Inter-Continental heavyweight title
26	Win	25−1	Joe Ageli	TKO	3 (10)	8 Aug 2026	Eventfinda Stadium, North Shore, New Zealand	
25	Win	24−1	Aekkaphob Auraiwan	TKO	1 (8), 2:59	22 Mar 2025	Qudos Bank Arena, Sydney Olympic Park, Australia	
24	Win	23−1	Faiga Opelu	SD	10	19 Sep 2024	Viaduct Events Centre, Auckland, New Zealand	
23	Win	22−1	Lucas Browne	TKO	1 (8), 2:01	12 May 2024	Perth Arena, Perth, Australia	
22	Win	21–1	Amron Sands	TKO	6 (8), 2:02	22 Jul 2023	FireLake Arena, Shawnee, Oklahoma, US	
21	Win	20–1	Richie Feulufai	TKO	1 (4), 1:31	4 Feb 2023	ABA Stadium, Auckland, New Zealand	
20	Loss	19–1	Faiga Opelu	TKO	4 (8), 1:21	16 Oct 2022	Rod Laver Arena, Melbourne, Australia	
19	Win	19–0	Christian Ndzie Tsoye	TKO	1 (8), 3:00	5 Jun 2022	Marvel Stadium, Melbourne, Australia	
18	Win	18–0	Mohammad Ali Bayat	TKO	2 (8), 2:57	16 Oct 2021	La Perle, Dubai, United Arab Emirates	Won inaugural WBC Middle East heavyweight title
17	Win	17–0	Julius Long	KO	7 (8), 2:55	27 Feb 2021	Spark Arena, Auckland, New Zealand	
16	Win	16–0	Joshua Tufte	TKO	2 (10), 1:10	15 Nov 2019	Salt Palace, Salt Lake City, Utah, US	
15	Win	15–0	Ali Kiydin	KO	1 (4), 1:06	12 Jul 2019	King Abdullah Sports City, Jeddah, Saudi Arabia	
14	Win	14–0	Julius Long	UD	6	30 Mar 2019	SkyCity Convention Centre, Auckland, New Zealand	
13	Win	13–0	Ed Fountain	TKO	7 (8), 1:46	2 Mar 2019	Voinovich Center, Columbus, Ohio, US	
12	Win	12–0	Junior Maletino Iakopo	TKO	2 (4), 2:59	6 Dec 2018	Ellerslie Event Centre, Auckland, New Zealand	
11	Win	11–0	Conrad Lam	UD	6	24 Nov 2018	AMI Netball Centre, Auckland, New Zealand	
10	Win	10–0	Daniel Tai	UD	10	1 Sep 2017	AMI Netball Centre, Auckland, New Zealand	Won inaugural PBCNZ and IBO Oceania-Orient heavyweight titles
9	Win	9–0	Alapati A'asa	TKO	2 (10), 2:43	3 Nov 2015	SkyCity Convention Centre, Auckland, New Zealand	Won vacant NZNBF heavyweight title
8	Win	8–0	Richard Tutaki	TKO	2 (4)	5 Sep 2015	ABA Stadium, Auckland, New Zealand	
7	Win	7–0	Andre Meunier	KO	1 (6), 1:41	19 Aug 2015	Hisense Arena, Melbourne, Australia	
6	Win	6–0	Junior Maletino Iakopo	UD	4	23 May 2015	The Trusts Arena, Auckland, New Zealand	
5	Win	5–0	Clarence Tillman	RTD	1 (4), 2:43	28 Mar 2015	Horncastle Arena, Christchurch, New Zealand	
4	Win	4–0	Fale Faleata	TKO	1 (4)	17 Oct 2014	ABA Stadium, Auckland, New Zealand	
3	Win	3–0	Will Quarrie	UD	4	4 Jun 2014	The Trusts Arena, Auckland, New Zealand	
2	Win	2–0	Faauli Maesililia	KO	1 (4)	19 Dec 2013	Mangere Bridge Tavern, Auckland, New Zealand	
1	Win	1–0	Clint Foai	TKO	1 (4)	18 Oct 2013	ASB Stadium, Auckland, New Zealand	

== Professional kickboxing record ==
Kickboxing record
0 wins, 1 loss, 0 draws
Date	Result	Opponent	Event	Location	Method	Round	Time	Record
2016-12-23	Loss	(Lithuania) Julius Mocka	EM Legend 15 - End of Year Finals Emei	Emei, China	KO (Right High Leg)	1	2:06	0–1
Legend: Win Loss Draw/No contest Notes
