= 2am Lockout =

2008 initiative in Melbourne, Australia

The "2am Lockout" was the name of a 2008 initiative set up by the Victorian Labor Government to curb alcohol-related violence in Melbourne. The three-month trial period began on 2 June 2008 and lasted until 2 September of that year. A permanent lockout was not instigated after the trial was over.

The lockout prohibited patrons from entering pubs, bars and nightclubs after 2am in designated areas which included the council areas of Port Phillip, Stonnington, Melbourne (including the Docklands) and Yarra. Licensees that breached the lockout could be fined a maximum of $6,899.

Protest poster

Melbourne Locked Out, a protest group designed specifically for campaigning against the lockout, was a source of opposition. On 30 May 2008, a protest was held at the Treasury Gardens, with about 3,000 people attending.

== History ==
The 2am lockout was announced on 2 May by Premier John Brumby. One of the objectives of the lockout was to reduce 'bar hopping' between 2am and 6am. On 2 June at 4.30am, the first morning of the trial, a bouncer struck a reveler outside a bar. Brumby used the incident to justify the need for the lockout.

Of the 457 premises that were originally planned to be bound by the lockout, 115 were granted exemption but must abide under a number of rules which include no passouts after 2am for smokers; passouts for food, cab etc.; no advertising the fact that they have exemptions, and extra security guards after 2am. A bid by VCAT to enforce the 2am lockout on exempt venues was dismissed on 16 June.

== See also ==
- Sydney lockout laws
