= Shane Young =

New Zealand mixed martial artist

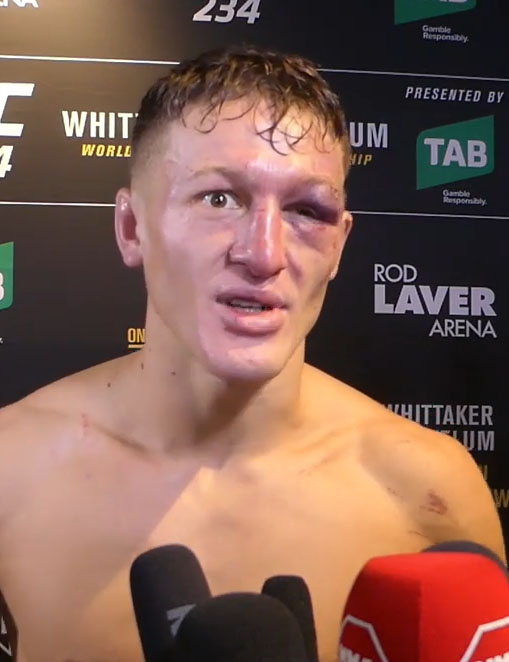
- Shane Young post fight interview at UFC 234
- Born: 31 July 1993 (age 33); Napier, New Zealand
- Height: 5 ft 8 in (173 cm)
- Weight: 150 lb (68 kg; 10 st 10 lb)
- Division: Lightweight (2014–present); Featherweight (2015)
- Reach: 72 in (183 cm)
- Style: Kickboxing
- Fighting out of: Auckland, New Zealand
- Team: GroundControl (until 2014); City Kickboxing (2014–present)
- Rank: Blue belt in Brazilian jiu-jitsu
- Years active: 2012–present

Mixed martial arts record
- Total: 21
- Wins: 13
- By knockout: 6
- By submission: 4
- By decision: 3
- Losses: 8
- By knockout: 1
- By submission: 1
- By decision: 6

Other information
- Website: shaneyoung.co.nz
- Mixed martial arts record from Sherdog

Shane Young (born 31 July 1993) is a New Zealand mixed martial artist (MMA) who competes in the Featherweight division and previously competed in the Ultimate Fighting Championship (UFC).

== Background ==
Young was born in Napier, New Zealand, and had a brother who died at the age of two. He went to Dilworth School, where he was the rugby team captain for two years. He studied to become an architect before pursuing a career in mixed martial arts. Young is of European and Māori descent and is affiliated with the Māori tribe Ngāti Kahungunu. He uses fighting as the platform to inspire New Zealand mixed-blood Māori to accept their Māori roots and to be sporting stars.

I wanted to see sporting stars ... especially half-cast people, people of European and Māori decent – the colonised and the coloniser. I wanted them to try and inspire Māori people. So many people especially at my age feel very whakamā, feel very shy to let people know that they're Māori because of the stigma attached to it.

I feel like Māori is magical and people need to see that magic.

I want to do it for my community and where I'm from. I want to be an inspiration to them. It also helps me and gives me mana. My ancestors were warriors, fighting to the death in battle. I'll talk about it and I'll say Māori words, and it gives me goosebumps. You can't fake that stuff, it gives you power.

He trains at Auckland's City Kickboxing gym where he is the teammate of UFC fighters Israel Adesanya, Dan Hooker and Kai Kara-France.

== Mixed martial arts career ==
=== Early career ===
Young started his professional MMA career in 2012 and amassed a record of 11–3 before being signed by the UFC.

=== Ultimate Fighting Championship ===
Young made his promotional debut as a short notice replacement against Alexander Volkanovski on 19 November 2017 at UFC Fight Night: Werdum vs. Tybura. The bout proceeded at a catchweight of 150 pounds. Young lost the fight via unanimous decision.

Young faced Rolando Dy on 23 June 2018 at UFC Fight Night: Cowboy vs. Edwards. He won the fight via technical knockout in round two. This win earned him the Fight of the Night award.

Young contemplated stepping away from fighting for the remainder of 2018 to tackle issues with depression after his bout with Dy. Prior to the bout, he had to borrow $40 to get to the airport for his flight to Singapore for the fight, and was dealing mental health issues surrounding the break-up of his marriage. Young said that he spent most of the time with his family while seeking to reconnect with his Māori culture, which helped him to return to a healthy state of mind.

We all know there's this magic in being Māori, being in the community and being able work with each other. What got me out of it was returning to my roots, my Māoritanga. We get caught up too much in the modern-day everything - I should have this because I should be rich and I should be all these things. But I was like, what I should be is what I am, a young Māori man in Aotearoa, where you have that appreciation for the land."

Young returned to fighting and faced Austin Arnett on 10 February 2019 at UFC 234. He won the fight via unanimous decision.

Young was scheduled to face Nate Landwehr on 27 September 2020 at UFC 253. However Landwehr was pulled from the event due to testing positive for COVID-19 and was replaced by newcomer Ľudovít Klein. At the weigh-ins, Klein weighed in at 150 pounds, four pounds over the non-title featherweight fight limit. The bout proceeded at a catchweight and Klein was fined a percentage of his purse, which went to Young. Young lost the fight via knockout in round one.

Young faced Omar Morales on 27 March 2021 at UFC 260. He lost the fight via unanimous decision.

Young faced Blake Bilder on 12 February 2023, at UFC 284. He lost the fight via unanimous decision.

Young faced Gabriel Miranda at UFC 293 on 10 September 2023. At the weigh-ins, Young weighed in at 149.75 pounds, three and three quarters pounds over the featherweight non-title fight limit. The bout proceeded at catchweight and Young was fined a percentage of his purse, which went to Miranda. He lost the fight via technical submission in the first round.

In October 2023, Young was released by the UFC.

== Championships and accomplishments ==
=== Mixed martial arts ===
- Ultimate Fighting Championship
  - Fight of the Night (One time) vs. Rolando Dy

== Personal life ==
Young was a builder and foreman prior to competing in MMA professionally.

Young has a son.

== Mixed martial arts record ==
Professional record breakdown
21 matches	13 wins	8 losses
By knockout	6	1
By submission	4	1
By decision	3	6

Res.	Record	Opponent	Method	Event	Date	Round	Time	Location	Notes
Loss	13–8	Gabriel Miranda	Technical Submission (rear-naked choke)	UFC 293	September 10, 2023	1	0:59	Sydney, Australia	Catchweight (149.75 lb) bout; Young missed weight.
Loss	13–7	Blake Bilder	Decision (unanimous)	UFC 284	February 12, 2023	3	5:00	Perth, Australia	
Loss	13–6	Omar Morales	Decision (unanimous)	UFC 260	March 27, 2021	3	5:00	Las Vegas, Nevada, United States	
Loss	13–5	Ľudovít Klein	KO (head kick and punches)	UFC 253	September 27, 2020	1	1:16	Abu Dhabi, United Arab Emirates	Catchweight (150 lb) bout; Klein missed weight.
Win	13–4	Austin Arnett	Decision (unanimous)	UFC 234	February 10, 2019	3	5:00	Melbourne, Australia	
Win	12–4	Rolando Dy	TKO (punches)	UFC Fight Night: Cowboy vs. Edwards	June 23, 2018	2	4:40	Kallang, Singapore	Fight of the Night.
Loss	11–4	Alexander Volkanovski	Decision (unanimous)	UFC Fight Night: Werdum vs. Tybura	November 19, 2017	3	5:00	Sydney, Australia	Catchweight (150 lb) bout.
Win	11–3	Bo Yan	Submission (choke)	WLF: W.A.R.S. 13	April 22, 2017	1	N/A	Zhengzhou, China	
Win	10–3	Zexian Jiang	Technical Submission (rear-naked choke)	Glory of Heroes: Rise of Heroes 7	February 18, 2017	1	5:00	Auckland, New Zealand	
Win	9–3	Siitia Leti	Decision	BRACE 43	October 1, 2016	1	0:36	Canterbury, New Zealand	
Win	8–3	Zhenhong Lu	TKO (punches)	Elevation Power in Cage 4	May 28, 2014	1	3:29	Zhengzhou, China	
Win	7–3	Rodolfo Marques	Decision (split)	Minotaur 3	June 1, 2014	3	5:00	Parkville, Australia	
loss	6–3	Guan Wang	Decision (unanimous)	Wu Lin Feng 2015: New Zealand vs. China	September 19, 2015	3	5:00	Auckland, New Zealand	
Win	6–2	Liucai Cui	Submission (rear-naked choke)	The Legend Of Emei 3	August 8, 2015	1	2:34	Shahe, China	
Win	5–2	Julian Wallace	KO (punches)	Xtreme Fighting Championship 24	May 23, 2015	1	1:16	Brisbane, Australia	Return to Featherweight. Defended the XFC Featherweight Championship.
Loss	4–2	Damien Brown	Decision (majority)	Xtreme Fighting Championship 23	February 28, 2015	3	5:00	Brisbane, Australia	Lightweigh debut. For the vacant XFC Lightweight Championship.
Win	4–1	Adrian Rodriguez	TKO (head kick and punches)	Xtreme Fighting Championship 22	November 24, 2014	3	3:32	Brisbane, Australia	Won the XFC Featherweight Championship.
Loss	3–1	Adrian Rodriguez	Decision (majority)	Xtreme Fighting Championship 20	February 15, 2014	3	5:00	Brisbane, Australia	For the XFC Featherweight Championship. Fight of the Night.
Win	3–0	Hayden Watt	Submission (rear-naked choke)	Shuriken MMA: Rise	November 23, 2013	3	5:00	Auckland, New Zealand	
Win	2–0	Jiraya Fernandes	TKO (punches)	Jiraya Fernandes	June 23, 2013	1	4:50	Wellington, New Zealand	
Win	1–0	Ray Karaitiana	TKO (punches)	ICNZ 18	September 22, 2012	1	N/A	Auckland, New Zealand	

== See also ==
- List of male mixed martial artists
