= Eugene Bareman =

New Zealand mixed martial arts trainer

- Born: 21 May 1979 (age 47); Auckland, New Zealand
- Nickname: The Mad Genius
- Height: 1.77 m (5 ft 10 in)
- Weight: 191 lb (87 kg; 13 st 9 lb)
- Style: Muay Thai, Kickboxing, Brazilian jiu-jitsu
- Stance: Orthodox
- Fighting out of: Auckland, New Zealand
- Team: City Kickboxing
- Rank: Black belt in Brazilian Jiu-Jitsu under André Galvão
- Years active: 2001–present

Mixed martial arts record
- Total: 7
- Wins: 4
- By knockout: 1
- By submission: 3
- Losses: 3
- By knockout: 1
- By submission: 1
- By decision: 1

Other information
- Notable relatives: Genah Fabian (cousin)
- Mixed martial arts record from Sherdog

Eugene Bareman (born 21 May 1979) is a New Zealand mixed martial arts trainer. He is a former professional mixed martial artist and kickboxer. He is the head trainer and founder of City Kickboxing.

== Early life ==
Bareman was born in New Zealand to a Dutch father and Samoan mother, as one of three children. He started training in mixed martial arts to get into shape to play rugby. He studied in law school in Auckland, before dropping out in his second year to focus on fighting.

== Career ==
Bareman had an unassuming career as an amateur kickboxer. He started fighting in local kickboxing tournaments in 2001, and mixed martial arts in 2006. As of 5 July 2018, Bareman fought in 48 fights across different disciplines.

Bareman founded City Kickboxing with former boxer Doug Viney in his local city Auckland, New Zealand in 2007. Bareman and City Kickboxing made their names in 2018, with the successes of their fighters Israel Adesanya and Dan Hooker. After both Adesanya and Alexander Volkanovski claimed UFC championships in 2019, Bareman and City Kickboxing were named as the Coach of the Year and the Gym of the Year, respectively, by MMAJunkie.com.

Bareman and City Kickboxing repeated as Coach of the Year and the Gym of the Year in 2020.

== Notable fighters trained ==
=== Mixed martial arts ===
- Israel Adesanya
- Alexander Volkanovski
- Kai Kara-France
- Dan Hooker
- Carlos Ulberg
- Navajo Stirling
- Brad Riddell
- Shane Young
- Tyson Pedro
- Genah Fabian
- Kevin Jousset

=== Boxers ===
- Junior Fa
- Hemi Ahio
- Baby Nansen

== Mixed martial arts record ==
Professional record breakdown
7 matches	4 wins	3 losses
By knockout	0	1
By submission	3	1
By decision	1	1

Res.	Record	Opponent	Method	Event	Date	Round	Time	Location	Notes
Win	4–3	Aaron Forsterling	Decision (unanimous)	Nitro MMA 10	26 October 2013	3	5:00	Logan City, Australia	
Loss	3–3	Gareth Ealey	Submission (rear-naked choke)	Shuriken MMA	13 October 2012	1	1:01	Auckland, New Zealand	
Loss	3–2	Tyler Manawaroa	Decision (unanimous)	Warriors Realm 15	18 August 2012	3	5:00	Gladstone, Australia	
Loss	3–1	Rodney MacSwain	TKO (leg injury)	Supremacy Fighting Championship 4	14 November 2009	1	0:15	Auckland, New Zealand	
Win	3–0	Steve Kennedy	Submission (rear-naked choke)	ETK Thai Boxing	20 December 2008	N/A	N/A	Auckland, New Zealand	
Win	2–0	Graeme Glidden	Submission (rear-naked choke)	Kiwi King of the Ring	23 February 2008	1	3:01	Tauranga, New Zealand	
Win	1–0	James Griffiths	Submission (kimura)	Carnage in the Cage	27 October 2007	1	N/A	Auckland, New Zealand	Welterweight debut.
