= City Kickboxing =

Martial arts gym based in Auckland, New Zealand

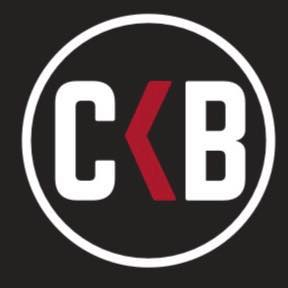
- Est.: 2007; 19 years ago
- Founded by: Eugene Bareman; Doug Viney
- Primary trainers: Eugene Bareman; Doug Viney; Chanel Niumata; Tristram Apikotoa; Mike Angove
- Current titleholders: Alexander Volkanovski; Carlos Ulberg
- Training facilities: Mount Eden, Auckland, New Zealand
- Website: citykickboxing.net.nz

City Kickboxing is a mixed martial arts training gym based in Auckland, New Zealand. The gym features professional fighters who have competed in many major promotions, such as the Ultimate Fighting Championship (UFC), Bellator, ONE Championship, and Dibella Entertainment.

== History ==
Eugene Bareman and Doug Viney founded City Kickboxing in 2007. The duo hoped that having their own premises would allow them to focus more on their training but quickly found the economics of running a gym was all-consuming and soon after transitioned to training professional fighters.

== Notable students & alumnae ==
=== MMA ===
- Israel Adesanya - Former two-time UFC Middleweight Champion
- Dan Hooker - #6 ranked UFC lightweight fighter
- Kevin Jousset - UFC welterweight fighter and former HEX two-division champion
- Kai Kara-France - #4 ranked UFC flyweight fighter
- Navajo Stirling - UFC Light heavyweight fighter
- Tyson Pedro - Former UFC light heavyweight fighter
- Brad Riddell - UFC lightweight fighter
- Carlos Ulberg - Current UFC Light Heavyweight Champion
- Alexander Volkanovski - Current two-time UFC Featherweight Champion
- Robert Whittaker - Former UFC Middleweight Champion
- Shane Young - Former UFC featherweight fighter
- Rong Zhu - UFC lightweight fighter
- Tom Nolan - UFC lightweight fighter

* Champions as of rankings as of September 28, 2025 after Ulberg vs. Reyes.

=== Boxing ===
- Hemi Ahio - current WBC Middle East, Former IBO Oceania, two time New Zealand national (NZNBF & PBCNZ version) Heavyweight Champion
- Junior Fa - former WBO Oriental interim & New Zealand national (NZPBA version) Heavyweight Champion
- Baby Nansen - former New Zealand national (PBCNZ version) & South Pacific (PBCNZ version) Super Lightweight Champion

== Awards ==
After both Adesanya and Volkanovski claimed UFC championships in 2019, Bareman and City Kickboxing were named as the Coach of the Year and the Gym of the Year, respectively, by MMAJunkie.com.

- MMAjunkie.com
  - 2019 Gym of the Year
  - 2019 Coach of the Year (Eugene Bareman)
- CombatPress.com
  - 2019 Gym of the Year
  - 2019 Coach of the Year (Eugene Bareman)
  - 2020 Gym of the Year
  - 2020 Coach of the Year (Eugene Bareman)
  - 2021 Gym of the Year
- World MMA Awards
  - 2022 Gym of the Year
  - 2022 Coach of the Year (Eugene Bareman)

== See also ==
- List of professional MMA training camps
