= Alexander Volkanovski =

Australian mixed martial artist (born 1988)

- Volkanovski in 2021
- Born: 29 September 1988 (age 38); Wollongong, New South Wales, Australia
- Nickname: The Great
- Height: 5 ft 6 in (1.68 m)
- Weight: 145 lb (66 kg; 10 st 5 lb)
- Division: Featherweight (2014–present); Lightweight (2014; 2016; 2023); Welterweight (2012–2013)
- Reach: 71 1/2 in (182 cm)
- Fighting out of: Windang, New South Wales, Australia
- Team: City Kickboxing; Tiger Muay Thai; Bangtao Muay Thai & MMA; Freestyle Fighting Gym
- Rank: Black belt in Brazilian Jiu-Jitsu under Joe Lopez
- Years active: 2012–present

Professional boxing record
- Total: 1
- Wins: 1

Mixed martial arts record
- Total: 33
- Wins: 29
- By knockout: 14
- By submission: 3
- By decision: 12
- Losses: 4
- By knockout: 3
- By decision: 1

Other information
- Website: alexandervolkanovski.com
- Boxing record from BoxRec
- Mixed martial arts record from Sherdog

YouTube information
- Channel: Alexander Volkanovski
- Subscribers: 804 thousand
- Views: 128.55 million
- Last updated: November 7, 2026

Alexander Volkanovski (born 29 September 1988) is an Australian professional mixed martial artist. He currently competes in the Featherweight division of the Ultimate Fighting Championship (UFC), where he is the current and two-time UFC Featherweight Champion. Volkanovski is the first Australian-born fighter to win a UFC title. He is also a former Australian Fighting Championship (AFC) Featherweight champion. Prior to his UFC debut, Volkanovski competed as a professional boxer in 2015. As of 16 June 2026, he is #2 in the UFC men's pound-for-pound rankings. He is considered one of the greatest featherweight MMA fighters of all time.

Volkanovski held the UFC's top pound-for-pound ranking during two separate reigns between 2022 and 2023 and was named Fighter of the Year at the World MMA Awards in 2022. He has the most featherweight title victories in UFC history. At the age of 36, Volkanovski became the oldest fighter to win the UFC Featherweight Championship, and at 38 became the oldest to defend the title successfully. Fight Matrix currently ranks him as the second-greatest featherweight of all time and the fourth-greatest fighter pound-for-pound.

== Background ==
Volkanovski was born on 29 September 1988 in Wollongong, New South Wales, into a mixed immigrant family. His father, Anthony Volkanovski (Macedonian: Антониј Волкановски), was originally a Yugoslav national, born in the village of Beranci in then Socialist Republic of Macedonia within Yugoslavia. His mother, Mary Volkanovski (Greek: Μαρία Βολκανόφσκι) was from Greece.

Volkanovski began training in Greco-Roman wrestling at an early age and won a national title twice at the age of 12. He decided to give up wrestling at the age of 14 and instead focused on a career in rugby league as a front rower. Volkanovski attended Lake Illawarra High School throughout his teenage years and worked as a concreter after graduation.

He played semi-professional rugby league for the Warilla Gorillas in the Group 7 Rugby League where he was awarded the Mick Cronin Medal in 2010 as the league's best player. He also played a crucial role in Warilla's 2011 Premiership winning season and received the Man of the Match award for his performance in his team's Grand Final victory over Gerringong. Volkanovski then decided to quit rugby league at 23 years of age to pursue a professional career in Mixed Martial Arts in the latter half of 2011. He claims to have watched Ultimate Fighting Championship events since childhood and would often rent UFC VHS tapes from Blockbuster as well as purchase UFC pay per views from 14 years of age.

Coach Joe Lopez said Volkanovski started training in MMA at the age of 22 and Greco-Roman wrestling to keep fit during the rugby league off season, where he weighed 97 kg (214 lb). However, he soon realized he had a passion for the sport and wanted to go as far as he could. Volkanovski quickly became a good counter striker with a powerful overhand right as well as a fantastic offensive wrestler. He initially competed in multiple amateur fights in the middleweight division as he adjusted from his rugby weight before turning professional and moving down to welterweight, lightweight and ultimately the featherweight division.

"There are no excuses in fighting. You can be playing a team sport and have a good game, and you can lose. In fighting, it’s all on me. If I go out there and lose, then it’s my fault. I like that. So I know if I fight well, I’m going to win. I definitely love the fact that it’s all on you, and you do what you have to do to win. Each fight is like a grand final in the rugby league."

Volkanovski is based at Freestyle Fighting Gym in Wollongong but regularly completes training camps at Tiger Muay Thai and Bangtao Muay Thai & MMA in Phuket and City Kickboxing in Auckland with fellow UFC fighters, former UFC Middleweight Champion Israel Adesanya, Dan Hooker and Kai Kara-France. Members of Volkanovski's team have included Eugene Bareman and Craig Jones.

== Mixed martial arts career ==
=== Early career ===
Starting as an amateur at middleweight and going 4–0 before turning professional, Volkanovski has fought in various MMA organizations in the Oceania region in Asia from 2012 to July 2016 before signing with the UFC. He won a Pacific Xtreme Combat (PXC) title and two Australian Fighting Championship (AFC) Featherweight titles. Volkanovski amassed a record of 13–1 with 10 straight wins prior to joining the UFC.

=== Ultimate Fighting Championship ===
Volkanovski made his promotional debut on 26 November 2016, and increased his win streak to 11 with a second-round TKO against Yusuke Kasuya at UFC Fight Night 101. He announced at the post-fight press conference that he would drop from lightweight to featherweight for his next fight.

==== Move down to Featherweight ====
Volkanovski was expected to face Michel Quiñones on 19 February 2017 at UFC Fight Night 105. However, the bout was scrapped after Quiñones suffered an injury and no replacement could be found.

Volkanovski returned to Featherweight and faced Mizuto Hirota on 11 June 2017 at UFC Fight Night 110. He won the fight via unanimous decision after almost finishing Hirota following a knockdown.

Volkanovski was expected to face Jeremy Kennedy at UFC Fight Night: Werdum vs. Tybura on 19 November 2017, in Sydney, Australia. However, Kennedy pulled out of the fight on 5 October, citing a back injury and was replaced by Humberto Bandenay. In November 2017, it was announced that Bandenay would delay his UFC debut at this event due to undisclosed reasons, and was replaced by Drex Zamboanga. In turn, Zamboanga pulled out of the fight due to visa issues and was replaced by promotional newcomer Shane Young. The bout proceeded at a catchweight of 150 pounds. Volkanovski won the fight via unanimous decision.

The bout with Kennedy was rescheduled and took place on 11 February 2018 at UFC 221. He won the fight via technical knockout.

Volkanovski faced Darren Elkins on 14 July 2018 at UFC Fight Night 133. He won the fight via unanimous decision.

Volkanovski faced Chad Mendes on 29 December 2018 at UFC 232. He won the fight via technical knockout in round two after surviving two knockdowns himself. This fight earned him the Fight of the Night award.

Volkanovski faced former featherweight champion José Aldo at UFC 237 on 11 May 2019. He won the fight via unanimous decision.

=== UFC Featherweight Champion ===
==== Volkanovski vs. Holloway ====
Volkanovski faced Max Holloway on 14 December 2019, for the UFC Featherweight Championship at UFC 245. Volkanovski won the fight via unanimous decision.

==== Volkanovski vs. Holloway 2 ====
Volkanovski made his first title defense in a rematch against Max Holloway on 11 July 2020 at UFC 251. He won the fight via split decision. This outcome was controversial amongst media outlets, with 18 out of 27 media scores giving it to Holloway, including mixed martial arts personalities such as UFC president Dana White, former referee and creator of the rules system John McCarthy, and multiple mixed martial artists.

==== Volkanovski vs. Ortega ====
Volkanovski was scheduled to make his second title defense against Brian Ortega on 27 March 2021 at UFC 260. However, the fight was canceled due to COVID-19 protocols. Volkanovski later tweeted that he tested positive for COVID-19.

On 2 April 2021, it was announced that Brian Ortega and Volkanovski would be the coaches for The Ultimate Fighter 29 at ESPN+ and the show featured bantamweight and middleweight contestants.

Volkanovski faced Brian Ortega on 25 September 2021, at UFC 266 for the UFC Featherweight Championship. He won the fight via unanimous decision. Volkanovski received universal praise for escaping multiple submission attempts and persevering. This fight earned him the Fight of the Night award.

==== Volkanovski vs. The Korean Zombie ====
Volkanovski was scheduled to face Max Holloway for a third time on 5 March 2022, at UFC 272. However, a day after the announcement, Holloway was forced to pull from the event due to injury. Holloway was replaced by Chan Sung Jung and the title bout was moved to UFC 273 on 9 April 2022. After knocking Jung down multiple times, Volkanovski won the fight via TKO in the fourth round. The win earned him the Performance of the Night award. The fight also earned him second place in the Crypto.com "Fan Bonus of the Night" award.

==== Volkanovski vs. Holloway 3 ====
The trilogy bout against Holloway was rescheduled at UFC 276 on 2 July 2022. Volkanovski won the bout via unanimous decision, with all three judges scoring the fight 50–45. This win earned him the Crypto.com Fan Bonus of the Night second-place award, which paid the bitcoin equivalent of US$20,000.

==== Volkanovski vs. Makhachev ====
Volkanovski moved up a weight class to challenge Islam Makhachev for the UFC Lightweight Championship on 12 February 2023 at UFC 284. He lost the closely contested fight via unanimous decision. This fight earned him the Fight of the Night award.

==== Volkanovski vs. Rodríguez ====
Volkanovski returned to featherweight and faced interim featherweight champion Yair Rodríguez in a title unification bout for the UFC Featherweight Championship on 8 July 2023 at UFC 290. He won the fight via TKO in round three.

==== Volkanovski vs. Makhachev 2 ====
Volkanovski was next scheduled to face Ilia Topuria on 20 January 2024 to defend his UFC Featherweight Championship at UFC 297. However, on 11 October 2023, Charles Oliveira withdrew from his lightweight title match against Islam Makhachev at UFC 294 due to a training injury. Volkanovski stepped in on 11 days' notice, moving up a weight class to challenge for the UFC Lightweight Championship in a rematch of their bout at UFC 284. He lost via head kick knockout in the first round.

==== Volkanovski vs. Topuria ====
Following the short notice rematch with Makhachev, the bout with Ilia Topuria was initially expected to continue forward and take place on its original date of 20 January 2024 at UFC 297. However, it was later pushed back one month to headline UFC 298 on 17 February 2024 instead. Volkanovski lost the championship by knockout in the second round.

==== Volkanovski vs. Lopes ====
With Topuria vacating the title, Volkanovski faced Diego Lopes for the vacant UFC Featherweight Championship on 12 April 2025 at UFC 314. He won the fight by unanimous decision. This fight earned him another Fight of the Night award. At the age of 36, he is the first male UFC fighter to win a title over the age of 35 between the flyweight and lightweight divisions.

==== Volkanovski vs. Lopes 2 ====
Volkanovski defended his title in a rematch against Diego Lopes on 1 February 2026 at UFC 325. He won the fight by unanimous decision. This fight earned him a $100,000 Fight of the Night award.

==== Volkanovski vs. Evloev ====
Volkanovski faced undefeated contender Movsar Evloev on October 24, 2026 at UFC 333. He won the bout via technical knockout in the second round, marking Evloev's first loss in mixed martial arts competition. This fight earned him a $100,000 Performance of the Night award.

== Professional boxing career ==
Volkanovski has a single boxing bout, which was a Super welterweight bout he won by unanimous decision in four rounds against Dillon Bargero.

== Personal life ==
Volkanovski married his wife Emma on 21 October 2012 and they have four daughters.

He appeared as a coach in Malaysia Invasion, an amateur MMA reality show. Because of his paternal Macedonian and maternal Greek heritage, he uses the nickname "The Great" in reference to Alexander the Great, claiming that he had "a Macedonian father and a Greek mother", similar to himself.

Volkanovski has his own YouTube channel. In 2021, Volkanovski debuted his own cooking show on his YouTube channel.

== Championships and accomplishments ==
=== Mixed martial arts ===
- Ultimate Fighting Championship
  - UFC Featherweight Championship (Two times, current)
    - Seven successful title defenses
      - Five successful title defenses (First reign)
      - Two successful title defenses (Second reign)
      - Most title fight wins in UFC Featherweight division history (9)
    - First Australian-born fighter to win a UFC championship
    - Oldest fighter in history to win the UFC Featherweight Championship (36 years, 195 days)
    - Oldest fighter in history to defend the UFC Featherweight Championship (37 years, 125 days and 38 years, 25 days)
  - Fight of the Night (Five times) vs. Chad Mendes, Brian Ortega, Islam Makhachev 1 and Diego Lopes (x2)
  - Performance of the Night (Two times) vs. Chan Sung Jung and Movsar Evloev
  - Second longest win streak in UFC Featherweight division history (11) (behind Max Holloway)
  - Second highest striking differential in UFC Featherweight division history (2.81)
  - Longest average fight time in UFC Featherweight division history (17:31)
  - Second most significant strikes landed in UFC Featherweight division history (1679)
  - Third most total strikes landed in UFC Featherweight division history (1899)
  - Third highest significant strike accuracy percentage in UFC Featherweight division history (56.9%)
  - Fifth most strikes landed per minute in UFC Featherweight division history (6.39)
  - Tied (Andre Fili) for fourth most wins in UFC Featherweight division history (14)
  - Tied (Andre Fili, Max Holloway & Movsar Evloev) for second most decision wins in UFC Featherweight division history (9)
  - Fifth most total fight time in UFC Featherweight division history (4:22:41)
  - Most leg kicks landed in a fight in UFC Featherweight division history (75 vs Max Holloway 1)
    - Second most leg kicks landed in a fight in UFC Featherweight division history (67 vs Max Holloway 2)
  - Most total leg strikes landed in a fight in UFC Featherweight division history (81 vs José Aldo)
    - Second most total leg strikes landed in a fight in UFC Featherweight division history (75 vs Max Holloway 1)
    - Third most total leg strikes landed in a fight in UFC Featherweight division history (67 vs Max Holloway 2)
  - UFC Men's Pound-For-Pound No. 1 in 2022 & 2023
  - UFC Honors Awards
    - 2021: President's Choice Fight of the Year Nominee vs. Brian Ortega
    - 2023: President's Choice Fight of the Year Winner vs. Islam Makhachev 1
  - UFC.com Awards
    - 2019: Top 10 Fighter of the Year
    - 2021: Ranked #2 Fight of the Year vs. Brian Ortega
    - 2022: Fighter of the Year
    - 2023: Fight of the Year vs. Islam Makhachev 1
- Crypto.com
  - Fan Bonus of the Night vs. Chan Sung Jung
- Australian Fighting Championship
  - Australian FC Featherweight Championship (One time; former)
    - One successful title defense
- Cage Conquest
  - Cage Conquest Welterweight Championship (One time; former)
- Pacific Xtreme Combat
  - PXC Featherweight Championship (One time; former)
- Roshambo MMA
  - Roshambo MMA Lightweight Championship (One time; former)
  - Roshambo MMA Welterweight Championship (One time; former)
- Wollongong Wars
  - Wollongong Wars Lightweight Championship (One time; former)
- The Sporting News
  - 2022 Male Fighter of the Year
  - 2023 Fight of the Year vs. Islam Makhachev 1 at UFC 284
- Combat Press
  - 2019 Breakout Fighter of the Year
- World MMA Awards
  - 2019 – July 2020 Upset of the Year vs. Max Holloway at UFC 245
  - 2022 Charles 'Mask' Lewis Fighter of the Year
  - 2022 International Fighter of the Year
  - 2023 Fight of the Year vs. Islam Makhachev at UFC 284
- MMA Junkie
  - 2021 September Fight of the Month vs. Brian Ortega
  - 2023 Fight of the Year vs. Islam Makhachev at UFC 284
- ESPN
  - 2021 Fight of the Year vs. Brian Ortega
  - 2023 Fight of the Year vs. Islam Makhachev at UFC 284
- MMA Mania
  - 2021 Fight of the Year vs. Brian Ortega
- Bleacher Report
  - 2023 UFC Fight of the Year vs. Islam Makhachev 1 at UFC 284
- MMA Sucka
  - 2021 Fight of the Year vs. Brian Ortega
- BT Sport
  - 2022 Fighter of the Year
- Cageside Press
  - 2022 Male Fighter of the Year
  - 2023 Fight of the Year vs. Islam Makhachev at UFC 284
- Sherdog
  - 2023 Fight of the Year vs. Islam Makhachev at UFC 284
- MMA Fighting
  - 2022 First Team MMA All-Star
  - 2023 Fight of the Year vs. Islam Makhachev at UFC 284
- Wrestling Observer Newsletter
  - Most Outstanding Fighter of the Year (2022)
  - 2023 MMA Match of the Year vs. Islam Makhachev at UFC 284
- Fight Matrix
  - 2020 Most Noteworthy Match of the Year vs. Max Holloway II at UFC 251
  - 2022 Male Fighter of the Year
  - 2023 Most Noteworthy Match of the Year vs. Islam Makhachev II at UFC 294
  - 2024 Most Noteworthy Match of the Year vs. Ilia Topuria at UFC 298
- The Wrightway Sports Network
  - 2025 Comeback of the Year at UFC 314
- CBS Sports
  - 2019 #4 Ranked UFC Fighter of the Year
  - 2021 #2 Ranked UFC Fight of the Year vs. Brian Ortega
  - 2023 MMA Fight of the Year vs. Islam Makhachev
- GiveMeSport
  - 2023 UFC Fight of the Year vs. Islam Makhachev 1 at UFC 284
- Sportsnaut
  - 2023 UFC Fight of the Year vs. Islam Makhachev 1 at UFC 284
- Australian MMA
  - 2025 Male Next Level Fighter of the Year

=== Amateur wrestling ===
- Australian National Schools Wrestling Competition
  - Gold medal - 12/13 yrs 62 kg (2001)

=== State/Local ===
- Key to the City of Wollongong: 22 May 2025

== Mixed martial arts record ==
Professional record breakdown
33 matches	29 wins	4 losses
By knockout	14	3
By submission	3	0
By decision	12	1

Res.	Record	Opponent	Method	Event	Date	Round	Time	Location	Notes
Win	29–4	Movsar Evloev	TKO (punches)	UFC 333	24 October 2026	2	4:54	Abu Dhabi, United Arab Emirates	Defended the UFC Featherweight Championship. Broke the record for the most UFC Featherweight title wins (9). Performance of the Night.
Win	28–4	Diego Lopes	Decision (unanimous)	UFC 325	1 February 2026	5	5:00	Sydney, Australia	Defended the UFC Featherweight Championship. Fight of the Night.
Win	27–4	Diego Lopes	Decision (unanimous)	UFC 314	12 April 2025	5	5:00	Miami, Florida, United States	Won the vacant UFC Featherweight Championship. Fight of the Night.
Loss	26–4	Ilia Topuria	KO (punch)	UFC 298	17 February 2024	2	3:32	Anaheim, California, United States	Lost the UFC Featherweight Championship.
Loss	26–3	Islam Makhachev	KO (head kick and punches)	UFC 294	21 October 2023	1	3:06	Abu Dhabi, United Arab Emirates	For the UFC Lightweight Championship.
Win	26–2	Yair Rodríguez	TKO (punches)	UFC 290	8 July 2023	3	4:19	Las Vegas, Nevada, United States	Defended and unified the UFC Featherweight Championship.
Loss	25–2	Islam Makhachev	Decision (unanimous)	UFC 284	12 February 2023	5	5:00	Perth, Australia	For the UFC Lightweight Championship. Fight of the Night.
Win	25–1	Max Holloway	Decision (unanimous)	UFC 276	2 July 2022	5	5:00	Las Vegas, Nevada, United States	Defended the UFC Featherweight Championship.
Win	24–1	Jung Chan-sung	TKO (punches)	UFC 273	9 April 2022	4	0:45	Jacksonville, Florida, United States	Defended the UFC Featherweight Championship. Performance of the Night.
Win	23–1	Brian Ortega	Decision (unanimous)	UFC 266	25 September 2021	5	5:00	Las Vegas, Nevada, United States	Defended the UFC Featherweight Championship. Fight of the Night.
Win	22–1	Max Holloway	Decision (split)	UFC 251	12 July 2020	5	5:00	Abu Dhabi, United Arab Emirates	Defended the UFC Featherweight Championship.
Win	21–1	Max Holloway	Decision (unanimous)	UFC 245	14 December 2019	5	5:00	Las Vegas, Nevada, United States	Won the UFC Featherweight Championship.
Win	20–1	José Aldo	Decision (unanimous)	UFC 237	11 May 2019	3	5:00	Rio de Janeiro, Brazil	
Win	19–1	Chad Mendes	TKO (punches)	UFC 232	29 December 2018	2	4:14	Inglewood, California, United States	Fight of the Night.
Win	18–1	Darren Elkins	Decision (unanimous)	UFC Fight Night: dos Santos vs. Ivanov	14 July 2018	3	5:00	Boise, Idaho, United States	
Win	17–1	Jeremy Kennedy	TKO (punches and elbows)	UFC 221	11 February 2018	2	4:57	Perth, Australia	
Win	16–1	Shane Young	Decision (unanimous)	UFC Fight Night: Werdum vs. Tybura	19 November 2017	3	5:00	Sydney, Australia	Catchweight (150 lb) bout.
Win	15–1	Mizuto Hirota	Decision (unanimous)	UFC Fight Night: Lewis vs. Hunt	11 June 2017	3	5:00	Auckland, New Zealand	Return to Featherweight.
Win	14–1	Yusuke Kasuya	TKO (punches)	UFC Fight Night: Whittaker vs. Brunson	26 November 2016	2	2:06	Melbourne, Australia	
Win	13–1	Jai Bradney	TKO (punches)	Wollongong Wars 4	8 July 2016	1	N/A	Wollongong, Australia	Won the Wollongong Wars Lightweight Championship.
Win	12–1	Jamie Mullarkey	KO (punch)	Australian FC 15	19 May 2016	1	3:23	Melbourne, Australia	Defended the AFC Featherweight Championship.
Win	11–1	Yusuke Yachi	Submission (triangle choke)	Pacific Xtreme Combat 50	4 December 2015	4	3:43	Mangilao, Guam	Won the PXC Featherweight Championship.
Win	10–1	James Bishop	TKO (punches)	Australian FC 13	14 June 2015	1	1:39	Melbourne, Australia	Won the AFC Featherweight Championship.
Win	9–1	David Butt	TKO (punches)	Wollongong Wars 2	1 November 2014	2	1:52	Thirroul, Australia	Lightweight bout.
Win	8–1	Kyle Reyes	Decision (unanimous)	Pacific Xtreme Combat 45	24 October 2014	3	5:00	Mangilao, Guam	Return to Featherweight.
Win	7–1	Jai Bradney	Submission (rear-naked choke)	Roshambo MMA 3	26 July 2014	1	4:58	Brisbane, Australia	Defended the Roshambo MMA Lightweight Championship.
Win	6–1	Rodolfo Marques Diniz	KO (punch)	Australian FC 9	17 May 2014	1	3:41	Albury, Australia	Featherweight debut.
Win	5–1	Greg Atzori	Submission (guillotine choke)	Roshambo MMA 2	1 February 2014	1	N/A	Brisbane, Australia	Lightweight debut. Won the vacant Roshambo MMA Lightweight Championship.
Win	4–1	Luke Catubig	TKO (punches)	Australian FC 7	14 December 2013	3	4:39	Melbourne, Australia	
Loss	3–1	Corey Nelson	TKO (head kick and punches)	Australian FC 5	10 May 2013	3	0:13	Melbourne, Australia	AFC Welterweight Tournament Quarterfinal.
Win	3–0	Anton Zafir	TKO (punches)	Roshambo MMA 1	17 April 2013	4	2:19	Brisbane, Australia	Won the Roshambo MMA Welterweight Championship.
Win	2–0	Regan Wilson	TKO (doctor stoppage)	Cage Conquest 2	23 February 2013	1	2:49	Nowra, Australia	Won the Cage Conquest Welterweight Championship.
Win	1–0	Gerhard Voigt	Decision (unanimous)	Revolution at the Roxy	19 May 2012	3	5:00	Sydney, Australia	Welterweight debut.

== Professional boxing record ==
1 fight	1 win	0 losses
By decision	1	0

No.	Result	Record	Opponent	Type	Round, time	Date	Location	Notes
1	Win	1–0	Dillon Bargero	UD	4	17 Apr 2015	Hurstville Entertainment Centre, Hurstville, Australia	

== Main Event bouts ==
No.	Event	Fight	Date	Venue	City	PPV Buys
1.	UFC 266	Volkanovski vs. Ortega	25 September 2021	T-Mobile Arena	Las Vegas, Nevada, United States	Not Disclosed
2.	UFC 273	Volkanovski vs. Korean Zombie	9 April 2022	VyStar Veterans Memorial Arena	Jacksonville, Florida, United States	Not Disclosed
3.	UFC 284	Makhachev vs. Volkanovski	12 February 2023	RAC Arena	Perth, Australia	Not Disclosed
4.	UFC 290	Volkanovski vs. Rodríguez	8 July 2023	T-Mobile Arena	Las Vegas, Nevada, United States	Not Disclosed
5.	UFC 294	Makhachev vs. Volkanovski 2	21 October 2023	Etihad Arena	Abu Dhabi, United Arab Emirates	Not Disclosed
6.	UFC 298	Volkanovski vs. Topuria	17 February 2024	Honda Center	Anaheim, California, United States	Not Disclosed
7.	UFC 314	Volkanovski vs. Lopes	12 April 2025	Kaseya Center	Miami, Florida, United States	Not Disclosed
8.	UFC 325	Volkanovski vs. Lopes 2	1 February 2026	Qudos Bank Arena	Sydney, Australia	Not Disclosed
9.	UFC 333	Volkanovski vs. Evloev	24 October 2026	Etihad Arena	Abu Dhabi, United Arab Emirates	Not disclosed

== Filmography ==
Year	Title	Role	Ref.
2026	Street Fighter	Joe	

== See also ==
- List of current UFC fighters
- List of male mixed martial artists

Achievements
Preceded by Max Holloway	5th UFC Featherweight Champion; 14 December 2019 – 17 February 2024	Succeeded by Ilia Topuria
Vacant Title last held by Ilia Topuria	7th UFC Featherweight Champion; 12 April 2025 – present	Incumbent
Awards
Preceded by Amanda Nunes	World MMA Upset of the Year; 2019–20 vs. Max Holloway at UFC 245	Succeeded by Adriano Moraes
Preceded by Kamaru Usman	World MMA Fighter of the Year; 2021–22	Succeeded by Leon Edwards
Preceded by Jiří Procházka vs. Glover Teixeira	World MMA Fight of the Year; 2022–23 vs. Islam Makhachev at UFC 284	Succeeded by Max Holloway vs. Justin Gaethje
