= Death of Thomas Kelly =

2012 manslaughter of an Australian man

Thomas Kelly (6 January 1994 – 9 July 2012) was an eighteen-year-old male from Sydney, Australia, who was the victim of a random one-punch assault as he walked down Victoria Street in Kings Cross, New South Wales, on 7 July 2012. Kelly was taken to St. Vincent's Hospital with serious head injuries and remained in intensive care for two days. He never regained consciousness and died at 7:59 pm on 9 July 2012. His attacker, inebriated 19-year-old Kieran Loveridge, was charged and convicted of manslaughter in 2014.

Kelly's death caused public outrage and received widespread media coverage. The case helped initiate legal reforms to New South Wales drinking laws, which saw the introduction of mandatory sentencing and lockout laws in 2014. These changes have been criticised by legal experts and members of the public, who believe they will not be effective deterrents and may impact Sydney's nightlife economy.

== Incident ==
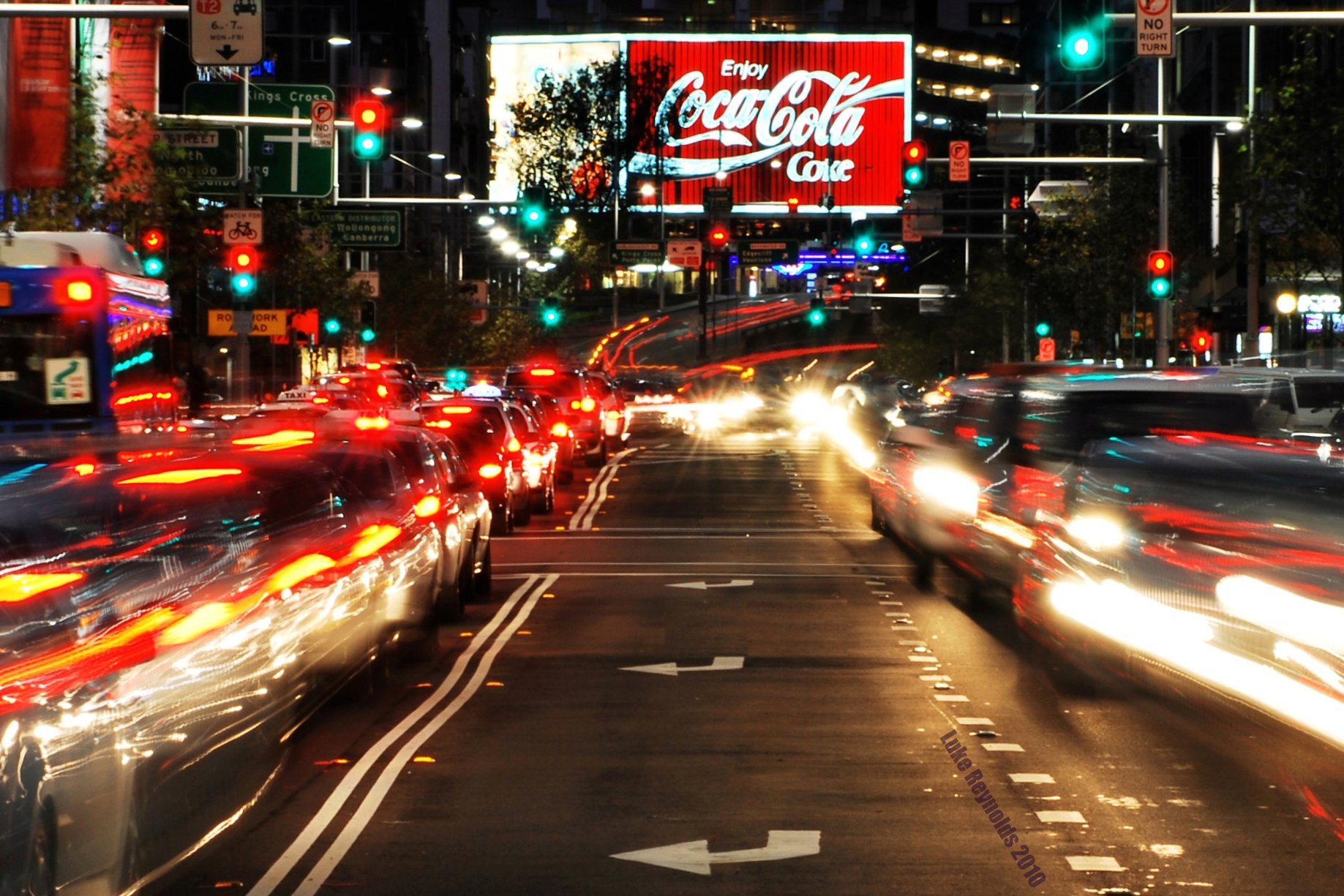
Kings Cross at night

On 7 July 2012, Kelly was on a night out with his girlfriend and another female companion. At 10:03 pm, the group passed the Mercure Hotel when a drunken Kieran Loveridge stepped out and punched the head of Kelly as he spoke on a mobile phone.

Loveridge struck Kelly near the nose area, which caused him to fall backwards and collide with the pavement, knocking him unconscious. The two young men were unknown to one another, and the attack was unprovoked and random. The impact of the concrete on Kelly's skull inflicted a fatal fracture and subsequent brain trauma. Immediately following the assault, Kelly became limp and comatose as a pool of blood formed around him.

Shortly after the incident, a witness observed Loveridge fleeing in the direction of the Victoria Street and Darlinghurst intersection. A second witness stated that Loveridge appeared "angry and possibly intoxicated".

At about 10:10 pm, paramedics responded to a call that a young male had been punched and was now unresponsive on Victoria Street in Sydney. They arrived on the scene seven minutes after the attack occurred, with one paramedic describing Kelly's condition as "severe and life threatening". He was fixed with a spinal collar and transferred to a stretcher before being taken to St. Vincent's Hospital by ambulance at 10:33 pm. Hospital staff intubated and ventilated the heavily unconscious Kelly, where he then underwent emergency surgery after a cranial scan uncovered acute hemorrhaging and a severe skull fracture. Kelly was placed in the Intensive Care Unit for two days until his family consented to switching off his life support.

Preceding the attack, Loveridge had been involved in a string of other violent and aggressive altercations. At about 7:30 pm, Loveridge and his friends arrived at the Star City Casino, having already consumed a substantial amount of alcohol. The group then traveled to the Cargo Bar in Darling Harbour where security denied them entry. The five males were then admitted to another bar, where more alcohol was consumed. Following this, the group took a taxi to Brougham Street in Kings Cross, where they continued to move between nightclubs.

At about 9:45 pm, Loveridge appeared to become agitated and on edge. The first assault took place at 10:00 pm as Marco Compagnoni walked along Victoria Street with other companions. The two males were strangers, and as they approached one another, Loveridge proceeded to elbow Compagnoni on the left eye, which lacerated the skin and drew blood. This encounter occurred shortly before and near the area where Kelly was attacked. At 10:15 pm, soon after the assault on Kelly, David Nofoaluma arrived on Bayswater Road outside The Club, where he attempted to greet a disgruntled Loveridge. Loveridge commenced to swing at Nofoaluma's head, before being restrained by another companion and then apologising. Loveridge then stated, "I swear I'm going to bash someone tonight".

Over the remainder of the evening, Loveridge assaulted three other males: Matthew Serrao, Rhyse Saliba, and Aden Gazi. All three victims were unknown to Loveridge before the attacks. Loveridge was on conditional bail at the time of the assaults.

== Court proceedings ==
Loveridge made several comments regarding the death of Kelly in the days following the attack. On 8 July 2012, a news story on Kelly's condition was broadcast on television, to which Loveridge appeared worried, asking, "Was that one of my fights? I don't know". He also expressed concern over whether he matched the description of the offender's appearance. On 12 July 2012, Loveridge confided in the coach of his rugby league team, making statements such as "I don't remember what happened that night, it could have been me. I was drunk".

=== Arrest ===
On 18 July 2012, the police arrested Loveridge at the Belmore Sports Ground at 7:20 pm, and took him to the Campsie police station, where he was charged with Kelly's murder. In March 2013, representatives of Loveridge offered a guilty plea to manslaughter and four counts of assault if the charge of murder was revoked. After deliberation, the Director of Public Prosecutions accepted the deal, and Loveridge was committed to the Central Local Court for sentencing before being submitted to the Supreme Court on 6 September 2013.

=== Trial ===
Loveridge pleaded guilty to all charges, and the trial went directly to sentencing. The judge considered both aggravating and mitigating factors when deciding on a penalty. Loveridge's previous criminal record, the unprovoked nature of the attacks, and drunken conduct were deemed aggravating factors. His disadvantaged background, remorse, and prospects for rehabilitation were considered as points of leniency. Loveridge received a 25% sentencing discount for pleading guilty.

At the conclusion of the hearing, the judge sentenced Loveridge to a total of seven years and two months, with parole eligibility after five years and two months. The sentences for the four other assaults amounted to a fixed term of eighteen months imprisonment. The individual sentence for the death of Thomas Kelly consisted of a non-parole period of four years, with an additional two-year term. Loveridge would be eligible for release on parole on 18 November 2017.

The initial sentence was met with frustration from Kelly's parents, who branded the punishment "an absolute joke". Loveridge was remanded in custody up until the lodging of an appeal in 2014 by the Director of Public Prosecutions.

== Appeal ==
In response to public outcry, the original sentence was appealed in 2014 by the Director of Public Prosecutions on behalf of the Crown. The appeal contended that the original sentence was "manifestly inadequate" and failed to consider the need for general deterrence. Other grounds of the appeal included errors in the examination and classification of Loveridge's crimes. A hearing was held in the NSW Court of Criminal Appeal on 7 May 2014, and was conducted by a three-judge panel led by Chief Justice Thomas Bathurst. The hearing found several errors in the original sentence imposed by Justice Campbell. The Crown overturned the previous legal ruling to uphold the grounds of the appeal and re-sentenced Loveridge for all five of his offences. He was handed down a seven-year non-parole internment for the death of Kelly, while the overall penalty was increased to a minimum term of ten years and two months. He was eligible for parole on 18 November 2022. In reasoning the outcomes of the appeal, the judges issued a statement:

"The use of lethal force against a vulnerable, unsuspecting and innocent victim on a public street in the course of alcohol-fuelled aggression … called for express and demonstrable application of the element of general deterrence as a powerful factor on sentence in this case".

These outcomes were met with relief from Kelly's family. At the conclusion of the appeal, Kathy Kelly stated "at last we can focus on our family and on the memory of our son, rather than on the whole court process". Loveridge served his sentence in the Silverwater Correctional Complex, where he was involved in a brawl with another inmate. He was charged with affray and referred to the Burwood Local Court.

On 4 April 2024, Loveridge was released on parole. Kelly's family did not support this release, but did accept it, with his father stating that he wished for Loveridge's "transition to community life [to be] as smooth as possible."

== Reforms ==
There was widespread community backlash at the death of Kelly, and NSW drinking laws came under heavy scrutiny. The death of Daniel Christie in 2014 also contributed to the growing demand for law reform. In response to mounting pressure, the NSW government committed to introducing "one-punch" laws to regulate and deter alcohol-fuelled violence. On 5 February 2014, the government passed the Crimes and Other Legislation Amendment (Assault and Intoxication) Bill 2014 (NSW). The legislation introduced a minimum eight-year sentence for alcohol-related assaults causing death, 10:00 pm closing times for bottle shops and 1:30 am lockouts, and 3:00 am closing times for all licensed venues within the CBD and Kings Cross. These changes exempted the Star Casino, which has one of the highest violence rates in Sydney. Police were also given the power to search any persons suspected of committing a drug or alcohol-fuelled offence. Barry O'Farrell, the NSW Premier at the time, said of the reforms "I'm confident that the package that cabinet approved yesterday will make the difference and start the change that the community seeks to have implemented". Those in support of mandatory sentencing argue that it provides legal consistency, incapacitation and general deterrence.

In a 2019 report, it was stated that since 2014, there has been a 26% reduction in alcohol-fuelled violence in lockout zones. However this has coincided with a 17% increase in assaults outside these areas.

In 2016, the NSW government declared that it would be adjusting lockout laws for live music venues by half an hour.

In May 2019, the NSW parliamentary committee announced it would review Sydney's lockout laws. The commission will determine if the laws require maintenance to balance both a safe city and the need for a nighttime economy. Premier Gladys Berejiklian said of the review, "after five years of operation, it makes sense for us to now take stock and examine whether any further changes should be made".

== Opposition to law reform ==
These legislative changes were met with scepticism by some legal experts. Mandatory sentencing was accused of minimising judicial discretion and impacting the sentencing process. Those in opposition argue that compulsory sentences deny offenders the right to equality by removing proportionate punishment. Phillip Boulten, President of the NSW Bar Association, said of the new laws, "it isn't effective, it's not a deterrent, it just leads to more people being locked up for no good purpose".

There has been strong opposition to lockout laws, particularly from owners of nightclubs and pubs in Sydney's CBD and Kings Cross. The reforms have been criticised for attempting to reduce violence by restricting the liberties of law-abiding individuals. The Australian Hotels Association claimed that stricter laws will impact on nighttime economy in the Sydney area. Since the introduction of these reforms, several bars and nightclubs have closed, with owners blaming lockout laws for damaging the nightlife industry. On September 5, 2015, a collective of 1000 members from Reclaim the Streets protested lockout laws. The group claimed that harsher legislation had not reduced alcohol-fuelled violence but rather forced it into neighboring suburbs, such as Newtown.

In October 2015, Keep Sydney Open organised a protest attended by 15,000 people in opposition to lockout laws. A second rally was organised in 2016, and was attended by 4,000 people. A third rally was planned for 2017 but was then shut down by police.

== See also ==
- Crime in New South Wales
- Tourism in Australia
- Death of Patrick Cronin
