= UFC Fight Night: Werdum vs. Tybura =

2017 mixed martial arts event

- The poster for UFC Fight Night: Werdum vs. Tybura
- Promotion: Ultimate Fighting Championship
- Date: November 19, 2017
- Venue: Qudos Bank Arena
- City: Sydney, Australia
- Attendance: 10,021

Event chronology
UFC Fight Night: Poirier vs. Pettis	UFC Fight Night: Werdum vs. Tybura	UFC Fight Night: Bisping vs. Gastelum

UFC Fight Night: Werdum vs. Tybura (also known as UFC Fight Night 121) was a mixed martial arts event produced by the Ultimate Fighting Championship held on November 19, 2017, at Qudos Bank Arena in Sydney, Australia.

== Background ==
This event marked the promotion's fifth visit to Sydney, and first since UFC Fight Night: Rockhold vs. Bisping in November 2014.

A heavyweight bout between the 2001 K-1 World Grand Prix winner and former interim title contender Mark Hunt against Marcin Tybura was expected to serve as the event's headliner. However, on October 10, Hunt was removed from the bout due to "medical concerns". He had recently admitted in an article trouble sleeping and said he's begin to stutter and slur his words. The UFC released a statement claiming that "the health-related statements made by Hunt represented the first time the UFC was made aware of these claims". They also announced that it would be required that Hunt undergo further testing and evaluations prior to competing in any future bout. As a result, former UFC Heavyweight Champion Fabrício Werdum was chosen as his replacement.

The Ultimate Fighter: Redemption welterweight winner Jesse Taylor was expected to face Belal Muhammad at the event. However, on September 13, it was announced that Taylor was pulled from the card after being notified by USADA of a potential doping violation. He was flagged after an out-of-competition drug test conducted August 22. He was replaced by Tim Means. On October 13, USADA officially suspended Taylor one year for testing positive for anti-estrogen agent clomiphene.

Jeremy Kennedy was expected to face Alexander Volkanovski at the event. However, Kennedy pulled out of the fight on October 5, citing a back injury. He was replaced by Humberto Bandenay. In turn, Bandenay pulled out of the fight on 6 November and was replaced by promotional newcomer Shane Young. The bout took place at a catchweight of 150 lb.

A lightweight bout between former Bellator Lightweight Champion Will Brooks and Nik Lentz was previously scheduled for UFC 216. However, the pairing was scrapped during the weigh-ins for the event, as Lentz was stricken with "medical issues" and deemed unfit to compete. The fight took place at this event.

A heavyweight bout between promotional newcomer Adam Wieczorek and Anthony Hamilton was initially scheduled to take place at UFC Fight Night: Cowboy vs. Till. However, the bout was removed a day before the event due to "safety concerns," as a few Lechia Gdańsk ultras – extreme and sometimes violent supporters of the local football team – showed up just prior to the weigh-ins. Wieczorek is a supporter of Ruch Chorzów, a Lechia Gdańsk rival team. The fighters were absent from ceremonial weigh-ins due to that reason, but the bout was eventually cancelled and rescheduled for this event.

Bec Rawlings was originally scheduled to compete against Joanne Calderwood at the event. However, on November 7, it was announced that Calderwood withdrew from the event due to "undisclosed reasons". She was replaced by promotional newcomer Jessica-Rose Clark.

Jessica-Rose Clark, Ryan Benoit, Frank Camacho, and Nadia Kassem missed weight at the official weigh-ins, coming in at 128, 129, 160 and 120 pounds, respectively. Rose-Clark and Benoit forfeited 20% and Camacho and Kassem forfeited 30% of their purses to their opponents and the bouts proceeded as catchweight bouts.

== Results ==
Main Card (Fox Sports 1)
Weight class				Method	Round	Time	Notes
Heavyweight	Fabrício Werdum	def.	Marcin Tybura	Decision (unanimous) (50–45, 50–45, 49–46)	5	5:00
Catchweight (128 lb)	Jessica-Rose Clark	def.	Bec Rawlings	Decision (split) (29–28, 28–29, 29–28)	3	5:00
Welterweight	Belal Muhammad	def.	Tim Means	Decision (split) (29–28, 28–29, 29–28)	3	5:00
Welterweight	Jake Matthews	def.	Bojan Veličković	Decision (split) (29–28, 28–29, 29–28)	3	5:00
Middleweight	Elias Theodorou	def.	Dan Kelly	Decision (unanimous) (30–28, 30–27, 30–26)	3	5:00
Catchweight (150 lb)	Alexander Volkanovski	def.	Shane Young	Decision (unanimous) (30–27, 30–26, 30–26)	3	5:00
Preliminary Card (Fox Sports 1)
Catchweight (129 lb)	Ryan Benoit	def.	Ashkan Mokhtarian	KO (head kick)	3	2:38
Lightweight	Nik Lentz	def.	Will Brooks	Submission (guillotine choke)	2	2:05
Heavyweight	Tai Tuivasa	def.	Rashad Coulter	KO (flying knee)	1	4:35
Catchweight (160 lb)	Frank Camacho	def.	Damien Brown	Decision (split) (28–29, 30–27, 29–28)	3	5:00
Preliminary Card (UFC Fight Pass)
Catchweight (120 lb)	Nadia Kassem	def.	Alex Chambers	Decision (unanimous) (29–28, 29–27, 29–27)	3	5:00
Flyweight	Eric Shelton	def.	Jenel Lausa	Decision (unanimous) (30–27. 30–26, 30–25)	3	5:00
Heavyweight	Adam Wieczorek	def.	Anthony Hamilton	Decision (unanimous) (29–28, 29–28, 29–28)	3	5:00

== Bonus awards ==
The following fighters were awarded $50,000 bonuses:

- Fight of the Night: Frank Camacho vs. Damien Brown
- Performance of the Night: Nik Lentz and Tai Tuivasa

== Records set ==
The event tied UFC 169, UFC Fight Night: Machida vs. Mousasi and UFC Fight Night: Silva vs. Bisping and later UFC on ESPN: dos Anjos vs. Edwards, UFC Fight Night: Vieira vs. Tateand UFC on ABC: Hill vs. Rountree Jr. for the most decisions at a single UFC event with 10. The record was later surpassed by UFC 263 which had eleven decision bouts.

This event also became the longest UFC event with 3:04:18 of fight time, passing UFC Fight Night: Machida vs. Mousasi with 2:53:32. The record was since surpassed by UFC 251 with 3:07:27.

== See also ==
- 2017 in UFC
- List of UFC events
- Mixed martial arts in Australia
