= List of prizefighters with professional boxing and kickboxing records =

There are many prizefighters with both professional boxing records and professional kickboxing records, including:

== A ==
- Dennis Alexio
- Christopher Algieri
- Hiromi Amada

== B ==
- Xhavit Bajrami
- Baker Barakat
- Mike Bernardo
- Jemyma Betrian
- Marc de Bonte
- Francois Botha
- Riddick Bowe
- Paul Briggs
- Shannon Briggs
- Curtis Bush
- Butterbean

== C ==
- Graciela Casillas
- Donald Cerrone
- Shane Chapman
- Chi In-jin
- Randall Cobb
- Roberto Cocco
- Carlos Condit
- Dale Cook
- Dewey Cooper
- Kit Cope
- César Córdoba

== D ==
- Lucian Danilencu
- Marcus Davis
- Daniel Dawson
- Troy Dorsey

== E ==
- Ben Edwards

== F ==
- Johann Fauveau
- Don Frye
- Kyotaro Fujimoto

== G ==
- Fredia Gibbs
- Konstantin Gluhov
- Rodney Glunder
- Denis Grachev
- Peter Graham
- Harut Grigorian

== H ==
- Regina Halmich
- Holly Holm
- Nieky Holzken
- Mark Hunt

== J ==
- Jomthong Chuwattana
- Dragan Jovanović

== K ==
- Kaoklai Kaennorsing
- Virgil Kalakoda
- Karapet Karapetyan
- Vitali Klitschko
- Albert Kraus
- Jörgen Kruth

== L ==
- Lamsongkram Chuwattana
- Jérôme Le Banner
- Artem Levin
- Jean-Claude Leuyer

== M ==
- Bruce Macfie
- Sergej Maslobojev
- Ray Mercer
- Mighty Mo
- Jarrell Miller
- Steve Moxon
- Zack Mwekassa

== N ==
- Miriam Nakamoto
- Antz Nansen
- Yōsuke Nishijima
- K. J. Noons
- Jan Nortje
- Phil Nurse

== O ==
- Andy Ologun
- Henri van Opstal

== P ==
- John Wayne Parr
- Tosca Petridis
- Vince Phillips
- Marek Piotrowski
- Jens Pulver

== R ==
- Pelé Reid
- Alessandro Riguccini
- Lucia Rijker
- Tsotne Rogava
- Kevin Rosier
- Rick Roufus

== S ==
- Saenchai PKSaenchaimuaythaigym
- Saiyok Pumpanmuang
- Sam-A Kaiyanghadaogym
- Samart Payakaroon
- Samson Dutch Boy Gym
- Joe Schilling
- Ray Sefo
- Umar Semata
- Anderson Silva
- Sirimongkol Singwangcha
- Matt Skelton
- Maurice Smith
- Patrick Smith
- Andy Souwer
- Jason Suttie

== T ==
- Yoko Takahashi
- Gregory Tony

== U ==
- Perry Ubeda
- Alexander Ustinov

== V ==
- Rico Verhoeven
- Doug Viney

== W ==
- Nicolas Wamba
- James Warring
- Kazuhisa Watanabe
- Adam Watt
- Arthur Williams
- Carter Williams
- Don Wilson

== Z ==
- Pavel Zhuravlev
- Cătălin Zmărăndescu
- Henriques Zowa

== See also ==
- List of female boxers
- List of male boxers
- List of female kickboxers
- List of male kickboxers
- List of mixed martial artists with professional boxing records
- List of multi-sport athletes
