= K-1 Fighting Network Romania 2007 =

K-1 martial arts event in 2007

- Promotion: K-1; Local Kombat
- Date: May 4, 2007
- Venue: Sala Polivalentă
- City: Bucharest, Romania
- Attendance: 4,000

Event chronology
K-1 World Grand Prix 2007 in Hawaii	K-1 Fighting Network Romania 2007	K-1 Fighting Network Scandinavian Qualification 2007

K-1 Fighting Network Romania 2007 was a kickboxing event held by the K-1 organization in association with the Local Kombat promotion on Friday, May 4, 2007 at the Sala Polivalentă in Bucharest, Romania.

== Background ==
An eight-man elimination tournament was held to determine a heavyweight winner to advance to K-1 World GP 2007 in Amsterdam. This event also featured two prestige fights.

== Results ==
Fight card
Weight class				Method	Round	Time	Notes
Heavyweight	(Belgium) Brecht Wallis	def.	(New Zealand) Paula Mataele	KO (straight punch)	2	1:00	Heavyweight Tournament Final
Heavyweight	(Croatia) Stefan Leko	def.	(Romania) Cătălin Moroșanu	Decision (unanimous)	3	3:00
Heavyweight	(Belgium) Brecht Wallis	def.	(Suriname) Errol Zimmerman	Decision (majority)	3	3:00	Heavyweight Tournament Semi Final
Heavyweight	(New Zealand) Paula Mataele	def.	(Bosnia and Herzegovina) Adnan Redžović	TKO (three knockdowns)	2	2:45	Heavyweight Tournament Semi Final
Heavyweight	(Romania) Daniel Ghiță	def.	(Japan) Nobu Hayashi	Decision (unanimous)	3	3:00
Heavyweight	(Suriname) Errol Zimmerman	def.	(Switzerland) Petar Majstorović	Extra round decision (majority)	4	3:00	Heavyweight Tournament Quarter Final
Heavyweight	(Belgium) Brecht Wallis	def.	(New Zealand) Doug Viney	KO (left roundhouse kick)	3	0:50	Heavyweight Tournament Quarter Final
Heavyweight	(Bosnia and Herzegovina) Adnan Redžović	def.	(Czech Republic) Petr Vondráček	Decision (unanimous)	3	3:00	Heavyweight Tournament Quarter Final
Heavyweight	(New Zealand) Paula Mataele	def.	(Romania) Sebastian Chira	KO	1	2:17	Heavyweight Tournament Quarter Final
Heavyweight	(France) Patrice Quarteron	def.	(Suriname) Ashwin Balrak	Decision (unanimous)	3	3:00	Heavyweight Tournament Reserve Bout

== Heavyweight tournament ==
Quarter-finals
(Switzerland) Petar Majstorović	2–0
(Suriname) Errol Zimmerman	DEC
(Belgium) Brecht Wallis	KO
(New Zealand) Doug Viney	R3.
(Czech Republic) Petr Vondráček	3–0
(Bosnia and Herzegovina) Adnan Redžović	DEC
(New Zealand) Paula Mataele	KO
(Romania) Sebastian Chira	R1.

Semi-finals
(Suriname) Errol Zimmerman	2–0
(Belgium) Brecht Wallis	DEC
(New Zealand) Paula Mataele	KO
(Bosnia and Herzegovina) Adnan Redžović	R2.

Final
(New Zealand) Paula Mataele	R2.
(Belgium) Brecht Wallis	KO

== See also ==
- List of K-1 events
- List of K-1 champions
- List of male kickboxers
