= Rony Sefo =

New Zealand martial artist

- Born: 10 April 1972 (age 54); Auckland, New Zealand
- Other names: Slyman
- Nationality: New Zealander
- Height: 1.83 m (6 ft 0 in)
- Weight: 108 kg (238 lb; 17.0 st)
- Style: MMA, Kickboxing
- Team: Ray Sefo Fight Academy

Kickboxing record
- Total: 22
- Wins: 10
- By knockout: 4
- Losses: 12
- By knockout: 2

Mixed martial arts record
- Total: 2
- Wins: 0
- Losses: 2
- By submission: 1
- By decision: 1

Other information
- Notable relatives: Ray Sefo, brother
- Mixed martial arts record from Sherdog

Rony Sefo (born 10 April 1972 in New Zealand) is a former two-time World Champion New Zealand kickboxer and mixed martial artist, who fought on Pride Fighting Championships and K-1. As a kickboxer he holds notable wins against Hiriwa Te Rangi and Ricardo Van Den Bos. He is the younger brother of the Muay Thai World champion Ray Sefo. Sefo is married to Kara, and they have two children.

== Championships and accomplishments ==
=== Kickboxing ===
1996 UTC World Heavyweight Champion
1998 ISKA World Heavyweight Champion

- K-1
  - K-1 Oceania 2000 (3rd)
  - K-1 New Zealand Grand Prix 2000 Finalist
  - K-1 New Zealand Grand Prix 2001 Finalist
  - K-1 Oceania 2001 (5th)

== Records ==
=== Kickboxing record ===
10 Wins (4 (T)KO's, 6 Decisions), 12 Losses (2 (T)KO's, 9 Decisions)
Date	Result	Opponent	Event	Method	Round	Time
5 March 2006	Loss	(Poland) Paul Slowinski	K-1 World Grand Prix 2006, Auckland, New Zealand	Decision 3–0	3	
10 December 2005	Win	(New Zealand) Jay Hepi	K-1 Kings of Oceania 2005 Round 3, Auckland, New Zealand	Decision	3	
10 July 2005	Win	(Netherlands) Ricardo Van Den Bos	K-1 Kings of Oceania 2005 Round 2, Auckland, New Zealand	Decision	3	
10 July 2005	Loss	(Australia) Peter Graham	K-1 Kings of Oceania 2005 Round 1, Auckland, New Zealand	Decision 3–0	3	
7 August 2004	Loss	(Sweden) Jorgen Kruth	K-1 World Grand Prix 2004 in Las Vegas II, United States	Decision 3–0	3	
12 September 2003	Loss	(Croatia) Ivica Perkovic	K-1 Final Fight - Croatia vs New Zealand, Split, Croatia	Decision	5	
11 April 2003	Win	(Croatia) Ivica Perkovic	K-1 Lord of the Rings, Auckland, New Zealand	Decision	5	
8 November 2002	Loss	(New Zealand) Jason Suttie	K-1 New Zealand Grand Prix 2002 Auckland, New Zealand	Decision	3	
8 November 2002	Win	(New Zealand) Terry Tuteru	K-1 New Zealand Grand Prix 2002 Auckland, New Zealand	KO (Punches)	3	1:13
13 April 2002	Loss	(Russia) Evgeny Orlov	K-1 Croatia Grand Prix 2002 Zagreb, Croatia	Decision 3–0	3	
18 February 2002	Loss	(New Zealand) Andrew Peck	K-1 World Grand Prix 2002 Preliminary Melbourne, Australia	Decision 3–0	3	
21 July 2001	Loss	(New Zealand) Doug Viney	K-1 New Zealand Grand Prix 2001	Decision (Unanimous)	3	3:00
21 July 2001	Win	(New Zealand) Hiriwa Te Rangi	K-1 New Zealand Grand Prix 2001	Decision 3–0	3	
21 July 2001	Win	(New Zealand) Gary Hart	K-1 New Zealand Grand Prix 2001	TKO	2	
24 February 2001	Loss	(Australia) Peter Graham	K-1 Oceania Grand Prix 2001, Melbourne, Australia	Decision 3–0	3	
24 February 2001	Win	(Australia) Muhammed Azzoui	K-1 Oceania Grand Prix 2001, Melbourne, Australia	TKO (Referee Stoppage)	2	0:43
10 November 2000	Loss	(New Zealand) Andrew Peck	K-1 New Zealand Grand Prix 2000	KO (Kick)	1	0:54
10 November 2000	Win	(New Zealand) Shane Wijohn	K-1 New Zealand Grand Prix 2000	Decision	3	
10 November 2000	Win	(New Zealand) Josh Khan	K-1 New Zealand Grand Prix 2000	KO (Punches and Knee)	2	
27 February 2000	Loss	(New Zealand) Mark Hunt	K-1 Oceania Grand Prix 2000, Melbourne, Australia	Decision 3–0	3	
27 February 2000	Win	(Australia) Fadi Haddara	K-1 Oceania Grand Prix 2000, Melbourne, Australia	Decision 3–0	3	
22 August 1999	Loss	(South Africa) Mike Bernardo	K-1 Spirits 1999, Japan	KO (Punch)	4	

=== Mixed martial arts record ===
Professional record breakdown
2 matches	0 wins	2 losses
By knockout	0	0
By submission	0	1
By decision	0	1
By disqualification	0	0
Draws	0	
No contests	0	

Res.	Record	Opponent	Method	Event	Date	Round	Time	Location	Notes
Loss	0–2	Sam Brown	Decision (unanimous)	XMMA 2 - ANZ vs. USA	31 July 2010	3	5:00	Sydney, Australia	
Loss	0–1	Kiyoshi Tamura	Submission (armbar)	Pride Shockwave 2003	31 December 2003	1	2:20	Saitama, Japan	
