= Mark Miller (kickboxer) =

American kickboxer (born 1971)

Mark "Fightshark" Miller
- Born: Mark Jason Miller; September 17, 1971 (age 55); Pittsburgh, Pennsylvania, U.S.
- Other names: Fightshark
- Nationality: (United States) American
- Height: 6 ft 2 in (1.88 m)
- Weight: 220 lb (100 kg; 16 st)
- Division: Heavyweight
- Style: Kickboxing, Muay Thai
- Fighting out of: Los Angeles, California, U.S.
- Team: Iron City Gym; Team Fightshark; Golden Glory
- Trainer: Maurice Smith Rob Kaman Buddy McGirt
- Years active: 1996-2012

Kickboxing record
- Total: 24
- Wins: 15
- By knockout: 11
- Losses: 8
- Draws: 1
- Last updated on: October 6, 2012

Mark Jason Miller (born September 17, 1971) is a retired American kickboxer who competed in the heavyweight division. He is also a published author and artist.

== Biography and career ==
=== Early life ===
Miller grew up in Latrobe, Pennsylvania and became involved with martial arts through his love of Bruce Lee and Chuck Norris films. His father took him to a boxing gym at a young age, and he also practiced Tang Soo Do, Hapkido, and Taekwondo as a child and teenager. He began competing in amateur boxing at the age of 18.

Miller graduated from the University of Pittsburgh with degrees in economics and political science in December 1993.

He later began Muay Thai and trained and fought in Thailand.

=== Career ===
Mark Miller made his debut in the K-1 promotion in August 2000 at K-1 USA Championships 2000, where he lost to Tommy Glanville via unanimous decision, suffering his first loss as a professional. He re-matched with Glanville in May the following year at K-1 World Grand Prix 2001 Preliminary USA, and avenged his loss with a split decision victory. He then took on Dewey Cooper in August 2001 at K-1 World Grand Prix 2001 in Las Vegas and lost by TKO in the 2nd round. In February 2002, he took part in the Grand Prix at K-1 World Grand Prix 2002 Preliminary North America and lost to Canada's Giuseppe DeNatale in the first round. This was to be his last bout in K-1.

In August 2006, Miller was set to compete in a bout for the S-1 Muay Thai promotion in Miami, Florida. However, he failed the Florida Athletic Commission's medical tests due to a heart condition. According to cardiologists, Miller had a 15% cardiac output due to a damaged aortic valve. In September 2007, he had open heart surgery to replace his aortic valve to repair the condition.

He made his return to the ring on May 28, 2011 at United Glory 14: 2010-2011 World Series Finals in Moscow, Russia against Nikolaj Falin. Miller knocked Falin out with a right hook nine seconds into the first round. Following this match, Miller joined the famous Golden Glory gym in the Netherlands.

10 months later, again in Moscow, Russia he faced Sergei Kharitonov at United Glory 15 in a fight where he gave up 46 pounds. Despite a strong early start, he succumbed to a massive right hand at the end of the first round losing by KO.

He faced Koichi Pettas at Glory 2: Brussels on October 6, 2012 in Brussels, Belgium and lost via KO in the second round. Due to suffering kidney failure in 2013, this would end up being the final fight of his professional career.

== Kickboxing record ==
Kickboxing record
15 Wins, 8 Losses, 1 Draw
Date	Result	Opponent	Event	Location	Method	Round	Time
2012-10-06	Loss	(Japan) Koichi Pettas	Glory 2: Brussels	Brussels, Belgium	KO (Right Cross)	2	
2012-03-23	Loss	(Russia) Sergei Kharitonov	United Glory 15	Moscow, Russia	KO (Right Hook)	1	1:59
2011-05-28	Win	(Russia) Nikolaj Falin	United Glory 14: 2010-2011 World Series Finals	Moscow, Russia	KO (right hook)	1	0:09
2002-02-09	Loss	(Canada) Giuseppe DeNatale	K-1 World Grand Prix 2002 Preliminary North America, Quarter Finals	Milwaukee, Wisconsin, USA	TKO	2	2:07
2001-08-11	Loss	(United States) Dewey Cooper	K-1 World Grand Prix 2001 in Las Vegas	Las Vegas, Nevada, USA	TKO	2	
2001-05-05	Win	(United States) Tommy Glanville	K-1 World Grand Prix 2001 Preliminary USA	Las Vegas, Nevada, USA	Decision (split)	5	3:00
2000-08-05	Loss	(United States) Tommy Glanville	K-1 USA Championships 2000	Las Vegas, Nevada, USA	Decision (unanimous)	3	3:00
Legend: Win Loss Draw/No contest Notes

== Personal life ==
Miller's memoir Pain Don't Hurt: Fighting Inside and Outside the Ring was published in July 2014 by Ecco Press, an imprint of HarperCollins curated by chef and author Anthony Bourdain. The book, co-written with Miller's girlfriend at the time, Shelby Jones, tells of his origins in a troubled family, heart surgery, struggles with addiction, and his kickboxing career. Kirkus Reviews described the book as "thoughtful but unsentimental" and "a force to be reckoned with". As of 2024, the memoir has a 4.7 out of 5 in reviews on Amazon Books. Miller had successful kidney and pancreas transplants at Cedars-Sinai Hospital in June 2016.
