= List of mixed martial artists with professional boxing records =

There is an overlap between the combat sports of boxing and mixed martial arts (MMA). Muhammad Ali vs. Antonio Inoki in 1976 served as the first significant bout between professional boxing and what would eventually become modern MMA. Floyd Mayweather Jr. vs. Conor McGregor was the highest-earning fight between the two disciplines, and initiated the trend of crossover matches in the 2010s and 2020s. Holly Holm and Cris Cyborg are the only fighters known to have won world championships in both boxing and mixed martial arts. Alternatively, Héctor Lombard and Andrei Arlovski have won major titles in both bare-knuckle boxing and MMA. Fighters with professional records in both are listed below.

== A ==
- (New Zealand) Israel Adesanya 5–1
- (United States) Ben Askren 0–1
- (Brazil) Jose Aldo 1-0-1

== B ==
- (Russia) Ali Bagautinov 2–0
- (United States) Alan Belcher 5-0
- (Brazil) Vitor Belfort 2-0
- (United States) Randy Blake 2–1
- (Australia) Arlene Blencowe 4–4
- (United States) Antwain Britt 1–0
- (United States) T.J. Brown 1–0
- (United States) Mikey Burnett 1–0
- (United States) Raphael Butler 35–12–0

== C ==
- (United States) Donald Cerrone 0–1
- (United States) Jason Chambers 0–1
- (United States) LaVerne Clark 14–18–1
- (United States) Rich Clementi 0–1
- (United States) Clay Collard 9–2–3
- (United States) Carlos Condit 0–1
- (United States) Kit Cope 1–1
- (Canada) Patrick Cote 0–1
- (United States) Rashad Coulter 1–0
- (United States) Jeff Curran 2–2–1
- (Brazil) Cris Cyborg 7–0

== D ==
- (United States) Dillon Danis 0–1
- (United States) Mac Danzig 0–1
- (United States) Marcus Davis 17–1–2
- (United States) Nate Diaz 1–1
- (United States) Nick Diaz 1–0
- (Republic of Ireland) Joe Duffy 7–0

== E ==
- (United States) Marvin Eastman 1–0
- (The Bahamas) Yves Edwards 2–0
- (Russia) Aleksander Emelianenko 1–1–1
- (United States) Eric "Butterbean" Esch 77–7–4
- (United States) Andre Ewell 0–4

== F ==
- (United States) Tony Ferguson 1–0
- (Canada) Ryan Ford 16–4
- (England) Julius Francis 23–24–1
- (United States) Don Frye 2–5–1

== G ==
- (United States) Leonard Garcia 0–1
- (Australia) Peter Graham 11–4–1
- (United States) Melvin Guillard 0–1–1

== H ==
- (Jamaica) Uriah Hall 1-1
- (United States) Chevelle Hallback 27–5–2
- (United States) Dennis Hallman 1–3
- (United States) Greg Hardy 3-0
- (United States) Heather Hardy 22–1–1
- (United States) Clint Hester 3–3–1
- (United States) Marcus Hicks 5–4–1
- (United States) Holly Holm 34–3–3
- (New Zealand) Mark Hunt 1–2–1

== I ==
- (Russia) Zelim Imadaev 0–1

== J ==
- (United States) Dustin Jacoby 1–0–0
- (United States) Keith Jardine 3–0–1
- (China) Qiu Jianliang 1–0
- (United States) Art Jimmerson 33–18–0
- (United States) Dashon Johnson 22–23–3

== K ==
- (Russia) Sergei Kharitonov 2–0
- (United States) Justine Kish 1–0
- (United States) Ava Knight 19–2–5
- (Sweden) Jörgen Kruth 1–0–0
- (United States) Mike Kyle 1–3–1

== L ==
- (France) Taylor Lapilus 1–0
- (Philippines) Jenel Lausa 10–0–1
- (France) Jerome Le Banner 6–0–0
- (United States) Kathy Long 2–1
- (United States) Chris Lytle 13–1–1

== M ==
- (Brazil) Jennifer Maia 3–0
- (Brazil) Fábio Maldonado 27–5
- (United States) Terry Martin 5–1–0
- (United States) Jorge Masvidal 1–1
- (Nicaragua) Ricardo Mayorga 32–12–1
- (United States) Court McGee 2–1–0
- (Republic of Ireland) Conor McGregor 0–1
- (United States) Tim Means 2–1
- (United States) Ray Mercer 36–7–1
- (United States) Guy Mezger 1–0–0
- (American Samoa) Mighty Mo 2–1–0
- (United States) Pat Miletich 1–0–0
- (United States) Frank Mir 0–1
- (United States) Jeff Monson 2–1–1
- (United States) John Moraga 1–3

== N ==
- (United States) Josh Neer 1–0
- (United States) Journey Newson 0–1–1
- (United States) Alex Nicholson 1–1
- (Japan) Yōsuke Nishijima 24–2–1
- (United States) K. J. Noons 11–2–0
- (South Africa) Jan Nortje 11–0–0
- (Cameroon) Francis Ngannou 0–2

== Q ==
- (United States) Billy Quarantillo 1–0

== P ==
- (England) Michael Page 2–0
- (United States) Dustin Pague 1–0
- (Australia) John Wayne Parr 11–3
- (England) Ross Pearson 1–0
- (United States) Luis Peña 0–2–1
- (Brazil) Alex Pereira 1–0
- (United States) Mike Perry 0–2
- (United States) Anthony Pettis 1–0
- (Cyprus) Costas Philippou 3–0–0

== R ==
- (Canada) Jessica Rakoczy 33–3
- (United States) Elena Reid 19–6–6
- (Canada) Nick Ring 5–1
- (United States) Angela Rivera-Parr 2–3
- (United States) Ricco Rodriguez 1–1–0
- (United States) Rick Roufus 13–5–1

== S ==
- (Italy) Alessio Sakara 8–1
- (United States) Darrill Schoonover 1–0–0
- (New Zealand) Ray Sefo 5–1–0
- (Puerto Rico) Amanda Serrano 40–1–1
- (United States) Eric Shelton 1–0
- (United States) Claressa Shields 18–0
- (Brazil) Anderson Silva 4-2–0
- (Brazil) Antônio Silva 0-1
- (Brazil) Assuério Silva 1–0
- (England) Matt Skelton 25–6–0
- (The Bahamas) Kimbo Slice 7–0
- (United States) Maurice Smith 0–2–0
- (United States) Patrick Smith 5–10–2
- (Croatia) Roberto Soldić 4–0
- (Netherlands) Tyrone Spong 14–0
- (Brazil) Ronaldo Souza 0-1
- (Kyrgyzstan) Valentina Shevchenko 2–0
- (Sweden) Andreas Spång 0–0–1
- (United States) Mia St. John 46–11–2
- (United States) Cody Stamann 0–1
- (United States) Jeremy Stephens 0–1–1

== T ==
- (United States) Din Thomas 1–0–1
- (United States) James Toney 77–10–3
- (United States) Erin Toughill 7–4–1 1NC

== U ==
- (Russia) Alexander Ustinov 36–5-0

== V ==
- (United States) Paige VanZant 0–0–1
- (Netherlands) Rico Verhoeven 1–0
- (United States) James Vick 2–2
- (Australia) Alexander Volkanovski 1–0

== W ==
- (United States) James Warring 18–4–1
- (United States) Carter Williams 2–0–0
- (United States) Jeremy Williams 43–5–1
- (United States) Rubin Williams 29–14–1
- (United States) Tyron Woodley 0–3

== See also ==
- List of female boxers
- List of male boxers
- List of female mixed martial artists
- List of male mixed martial artists
- List of multi-sport athletes
- List of prizefighters with professional boxing and kickboxing records
- List of professional wrestlers by MMA record
