= Paul Slowinski =

Polish kickboxer (b.1980)

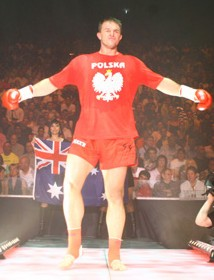
- Born: Paweł Słowiński; 24 September 1980 (age 46); Strzegom, Poland
- Other names: The Sting
- Citizenship: Polish; Australian
- Height: 1.90 m (6 ft 3 in)
- Weight: 110 kg (243 lb; 17 st 5 lb)
- Division: Light Heavyweight; Cruiserweight; Heavyweight; Heavyweight (MMA)
- Style: Muay Thai
- Fighting out of: Adelaide, South Australia, Australia
- Team: RIKERS GYM Flinders Muaythai (1998–2007); Team Hoost (2007–2009); Blackzilians (MMA) (2013 – present)
- Trainer: Alan Wong (1998–2007); Ernesto Hoost (2007–2009)
- Years active: 1999–2016 (Kickboxing); 2013–present (MMA)

Kickboxing record
- Total: 129
- Wins: 106
- By knockout: 62
- Losses: 22
- By knockout: 8
- Draws: 1

Mixed martial arts record
- Total: 3
- Wins: 1
- By knockout: 1
- By submission: 0
- By decision: 0
- Losses: 2
- By knockout: 1
- By submission: 1
- By decision: 0
- Draws: 0
- No contests: 0

Other information
- Mixed martial arts record from Sherdog
- Last updated on: 14 June 2014

Paul "The Sting" Slowinski (born 24 September 1980) is a Polish-Australian kickboxer, a four-time World Muay Thai Council (WMC) Muay Thai World champion and two-time K-1 World GP 2006 in Auckland and K-1 World GP 2007 in Amsterdam champion. After two years training in Amsterdam, Netherlands under Ernesto Hoost, Slowinski moved back to Adelaide in 2009 and began to teach and train out of Rikers Gym. He has competed in the K-1 and SUPERKOMBAT promotions.

== Biography ==
Paul Slowinski was born in Strzegom, Poland and immigrated to Adelaide, Australia in 1996 as a teenager with his mother and brother. He started kickboxing in 1998 under Alan Wong. He turned pro in February 2001.

He faced Cătălin Moroşanu at the K-1 World Grand Prix 2012 in Tokyo final 16 on 14 October 2012 and lost via unanimous decision after visiting the canvas twice in round three.

He defeated Nato Lauui via unanimous decision at Kings of Kombat 8 in Melbourne on 8 December 2012.

Slowinski and Ben Edwards met for the fourth time on 23 March 2013 in Canberra, Australia at Capital Punishment 7. Edwards won on points to bring their rivalry to 2–2.

He made his professional MMA debut against Leamy Tato at MMA Downunder 4, on 21 September 2013. The event was held at the Adelaide Arena in Adelaide, South Australia. He spend time training for this bout with the Blackzilians training camp in Boca Raton, Florida.

He lost to Raul Cătinaș by third-round KO at the SUPERKOMBAT World Grand Prix 2013 Final in Galați, Romania on 21 December 2013.

Slowinski defeated Tsotne Rogava via unanimous decision to win the WMC World Super Heavyweight (+95 kg/209 lb) Championship at Monte Carlo Fighting Masters 2014 in Monte Carlo, Monaco on 14 June 2014.

== Titles ==
- 2014 WMC Super Heavyweight World champion
- 2011 ISKA Heavyweight World champion
- 2010 K-1 Oceania GP in Canberra runner up
- 2009 International Kickboxer Magazine Super Heavyweight(+95 kg) champion
- 2009 WMC Super Heavyweight World champion
- 2008 WMC Super Heavyweight World champion
- 2007 WMC Super Heavyweight World champion
- 2007 K-1 World GP in Amsterdam champion
- 2006 K-1 World Grand Prix in Auckland champion
- 2005 KOMA GP in Tokyo champion
- 2005 WMC World Heavyweight GP champion
- 2005 King of Oceania champion
- 2003 WMC Heavyweight World champion
- 2002 WMC Cruiserweight World champion
- 2001 WMC Light Heavyweight World champion
- 2001 Super 8 Tournament in Brisbane champion
- 1999 IAMTF Australian Super Light Heavyweight champion
- 1999 King's Birthday Cup Amateur champion

== Kickboxing record ==
Kickboxing Record
106 Wins (63 (T)KOs), 22 Losses, 1 Draw
Date	Result	Opponent	Event	Location	Method	Round	Time
2015-12-26	Loss	(Azerbaijan) Zabit Samedov	Akhmat Fight Show	Grozny, Russia	Decision (unanimous)	3	3:00
2014-06-14	Win	(Ukraine) Tsotne Rogava	Monte Carlo Fighting Masters 2014	Monte Carlo, Monaco	Decision (unanimous)	5	3:00
Wins WMC Super Heavyweight Title.
2013-12-21	Loss	(Romania) Raul Cătinaș	SUPERKOMBAT World Grand Prix 2013 Final	Galați, Romania	KO (left uppercut)	3	2:32
2013-12-04	Win	(Turkey) Cihad Kepenek	A1 World Grand Prix 2013	Melbourne, Australia	TKO	1	
2013-03-23	Loss	(Australia) Ben Edwards	Capital Punishment 7	Canberra, Australia	Decision	3	3:00
2012-12-08	Win	(New Zealand) Nato Lauui	Kings of Kombat 8	Australia	Decision (unanimous)	3	3:00
2012-11-17	Win	(New Zealand) Antz Nansen	Knees of Fury 39	Adelaide, Australia	KO (kick to the body)	2	
2012-10-14	Loss	(Romania) Cătălin Moroşanu	K-1 World Grand Prix 2012 in Tokyo final 16, First Round	Tokyo, Japan	Decision (unanimous)	3	3:00
2012-08-25	Win	(New Zealand) Doug Viney	Capital Punishment 6	Canberra, Australia	Decision	3	3:00
2012-02-25	Win	(United States) Steve Banks	Knees of Fury 36	Mile End, Australia	TKO (leg kicks)	3	
2011-11-26	Win	(England) Chris Knowles	Knees of Fury 35	Mile End, Australia	TKO (leg kicks)	1	
2011-09-16	Win	(United States) Steve Banks	Knees of Fury 34	Mile End, Australia	KO (body hook)	3	
2011-08-20	Win	(Australia) Peter Graham	Kings of Combat 4	Keysborough, Australia	KO	3	
Wins I.S.K.A. World Heavyweight Title.
2011-02-26	Win	(Australia) Thor Hoopman	Knees of Fury 32	Mile End, Australia	TKO (punches)	1	3:00
2010-12-15	Win	(United States) Carter Williams	Kings of Combat 2	Melbourne, Australia	TKO	2	
2010-11-13	Win	(Australia) Andre Meunier	Knees of Fury 31	Adelaide, Australia	KO (left round kick)	1	0:33
2010-08-29	Win	(New Zealand) Sio Vitale	Kings of Combat	Keysborough, Australia	TKO	1	
2010-07-10	Loss	(Australia) Ben Edwards	K-1 Oceania GP 2010, Final	Canberra, Australia	KO (right hook)	1	0:59
Fight was for K-1 Oceania GP 2010 tournament title.
2010-07-10	Win	(Tonga) Cedric Kongaika	K-1 Oceania GP 2010, Semi-final	Canberra, Australia	TKO (left high kick)	3	1:16
2010-07-10	Win	(New Zealand) Sio Vitale	K-1 Oceania GP 2010, Quarter Final	Canberra, Australia	TKO (left middle kick)	1	2:52
2010-06-09	Loss	(Australia) Steve McKinnon	Last Man Standing 2 Tournament, Semi-final	Melbourne, Australia	Decision (Majority)	3	3:00
2010-06-09	Win	(Australia) Eric Nosa	Last Man Standing 2 Tournament, Reserve Fight	Melbourne, Australia	KO (left high kick)	1	1:23
2010-03-28	Win	(Latvia) Konstantin Gluhov	K-1 World Grand Prix 2010 in Warsaw, Super Fight	Warsaw, Poland	KO (right overhand)	2	0:59
2010-01-09	Loss	(Netherlands) Hesdy Gerges	Ring Sensation Championship: Uprising 12	Rotterdam, Netherlands	Decision (unanimous)	3	3:00
2009-11-14	Loss	(Australia) Thor Hoopman	Knees of Fury 27	Mile End, Australia	Decision (unanimous)	5	3:00
2009-10-09	Win	(Australia) Ben Edwards	Evolution 18	Melbourne, Australia	TKO (low kicks)	3	
Wins IK World Super Heavyweight Title (+95 kg).
2009-06-26	Win	(France) Patrice Quarteron	Champions of Champions 2	Montego Bay, Jamaica	KO (left hook)	2	1:55
Wins WMC World Super Heavyweight Title.
2008-12-06	Loss	(Netherlands) Melvin Manhoef	K-1 World GP 2008 Final, Reserve Fight	Yokohama, Japan	KO (left hook)	1	2:26
2008-11-15	Win	(Croatia) Domagoj Ostojic	Angels of Fire IV Against All Odds	Płock, Poland	KO	1	
2008-09-27	Loss	(Netherlands) Remy Bonjasky	K-1 World GP 2008 Final 16	Seoul, South Korea	Decision (Majority))	3	3:00
Fails to qualify for K-1 Grand Prix '08 Final.
2008-08-09	Win	(Morocco) Aziz Jahjah	K-1 World GP 2008 in Hawaii	Hawaii	KO (punches)	3	1:53
2008-06-28	Win	(Czech Republic) Antonin Dusek	European Muaythai Championships 2008	Zgorzelec, Poland	TKO (doctor stoppage)	2	3:00
Wins WMC World Super Heavyweight Title.
2008-04-26	Loss	(Turkey) Gokhan Saki	K-1 World GP 2008 in Amsterdam	Amsterdam, Netherlands	KO (left cross)	1	2:40
2007-12-08	Win	(United States) Mighty Mo	K-1 World Grand Prix 2007 Final, Reserve Fight	Yokohama, Japan	TKO (low kicks)	2	0:50
2007-09-29	Loss	(Netherlands) Semmy Schilt	K-1 World GP 2007 in Seoul Final 16	Seoul, South Korea	KO (Knee)	1	2:26
Fails to qualify for K-1 Grand Prix '07 Final.
2007-07-28	Win	(Sudan) Faisal Zakaria	Fists of Fury	Singapore	TKO (low kick)	4	0:08
Wins WMC Super Heavyweight World Title.
2007-06-23	Win	(Switzerland) Bjorn Bregy	K-1 World Grand Prix 2007 in Amsterdam, Final	Amsterdam, Netherlands	KO (right hook)	2	2:25
Wins K-1 World Grand Prix 2007 in Amsterdam tournament title.
2007-06-23	Win	(Azerbaijan) Zabit Samedov	K-1 World Grand Prix 2007 in Amsterdam, Semi-final	Amsterdam, Netherlands	TKO (2 knockdown)	1	3:00
2007-06-23	Win	(Japan) Hiromi Amada	K-1 World Grand Prix 2007 in Amsterdam, Quarter Final	Amsterdam, Netherlands	TKO (2 knockdown)	1	1:50
2007-06-02	Win	(Iran) Abbas Asaraki	Fury in Macau	Macau, China	TKO (low kicks)	2	2:21
2006-12-02	Loss	(Morocco) Badr Hari	K-1 World Grand Prix 2006 in Tokyo Final, Super Fight	Tokyo, Japan	Decision (unanimous)	3	3:00
2006-11-11	Win	(Switzerland) Xhavit Bajrami	Xplosion	Macau, China	Decision	5	3:00
2006-05-26	Win	(Switzerland) Xhavit Bajrami		Switzerland	Decision		
2006-09-30	Loss	(Brazil) Glaube Feitosa	K-1 World Grand Prix 2006 in Osaka opening round	Osaka, Japan	Decision (unanimous)	3	3:00
Fails to qualify for K-1 Grand Prix '06 Final.
2006-07-30	Win	(Japan) Tatsufumi Tomihira	K-1 World Grand Prix 2006 in Sapporo	Sapporo, Japan	Decision (unanimous)	3	3:00
2006-04-24	Loss	(Russia) Alexander Ustinov	MARS World Fighting GP	Seoul, South Korea	KO (punches)	2	2:55
2006-03-05	Win	(New Zealand) Jason Suttie	K-1 World Grand Prix 2006 in Auckland, Final	Auckland, New Zealand	KO (left high kick)	2	1:45
Wins K-1 World Grand Prix 2006 in Auckland tournament title.
2006-03-05	Win	(Australia) Peter Graham	K-1 World Grand Prix 2006 in Auckland, Semi-final	Auckland, New Zealand	KO (low kicks)	2	1:42
2006-03-05	Win	(New Zealand) Rony Sefo	K-1 World Grand Prix 2006 in Auckland, Quarter Final	Auckland, New Zealand	Decision (unanimous)	3	3:00
2006-02-02	Win	(United Arab Emirates) Abdumalik Gadzhiev	Knees of Fury 12	Adelaide, Australia	KO (Leg kicks)	2	
2005-12-22	Win	(Japan) Yuuki Niimura	KOMA GP, Final	Tokyo, Japan	KO	2	
Wins KOMA GP Title.
2005-12-22	Win	(Japan) Kanenobu	KOMA GP, Semi-final	Tokyo, Japan	KO	2	
2005-12-22	Win	(South Korea) Soo Kyong	KOMA GP, Quarter Final	Tokyo, Japan	KO	1	
2005-12-10	Win	(Australia) Ben Edwards	K-1 Kings of Oceania 2005 Round 3	Gold Coast, Australia	KO	2	
2005-11-04	Loss	(New Zealand) Jason Suttie	Knees of Fury 11	Adelaide, Australia	KO (left hook)	3	
2005-10-08	Win	(New Zealand) Daniel Tai	K-1 Kings of Oceania 2005 Round 2	Auckland, New Zealand	TKO	2	
2005-08-22	Win	(South Korea) Kwak Yoon Sup	Titans 2nd	Tokyo, Japan	KO (low kicks)	1	0:38
2005-07-10	Win	(New Zealand) Sydney Asiata	K-1 Kings of Oceania 2005 Round 1	Auckland, New Zealand	KO (left hook)	1	
2005-06-25	Win	(Japan) Ryu	K-1 Challenge 2005 Xplosion X	Gold Coast, Australia	TKO (Corner Stoppage)	2	3:00
2005-08-18	Win	(Netherlands) Ricardo van den Bos	Knees of Fury 10 WMC World Heavyweight GP, Final	Australia	TKO (Threw in towel)	1	0:05
Wins Knees of Fury 10 WMC World Heavyweight GP Title.
2005-08-18	Win	(Australia) Roger Izonritei	Knees of Fury 10 WMC World Heavyweight GP, Semi-final	Australia	TKO (Knee strikes)	2	2:30
2005-08-18	Win	(New Zealand) Andrew Peck	Knees of Fury 10 WMC World Heavyweight GP, Quarter Final	Australia	KO (right hook)	1	2:00
2005-04-30	Win	(New Zealand) Rony Sefo	K-1 Battle of Anzacs II	Auckland, New Zealand	Decision (Split)	3	3:00
2005-03-11	Win	(Iran) Mohammad Reza	Knees of Fury IX	Adelaide, Australia	KO (Elbows)	2	
2004-12-18	Win	(Australia) Chris Chrisopoulides	K-1 Challenge 2004 Oceania vs World	Gold Coast, Australia	Decision	3	3:00
2004-11-06	Loss	(Belarus) Alexey Ignashov	Titans 1st	Kitakyushu, Japan	Decision (unanimous)	3	3:00
2004-10-15	Win	Matt Samoa	Knees of Fury VIII	Adelaide, Australia	KO	2	
2004-09-05	Loss	(Sweden) Jorgen Kruth	SM Thaiboxing Gala	Stockholm, Sweden	Decision	5	3:00
2004-07-16	Loss	(Australia) Peter Graham	Kings of Oceania 2004, Semi-final	Auckland, New Zealand	Decision	3	3:00
2004-07-16	Win	(New Zealand) Sio Vitale	Kings of Oceania 2004, Quarter Final	Auckland, New Zealand	Decision	3	3:00
2004-06-18	Win	(New Zealand) Rony Sefo	Knees of Fury VII	Adelaide, Australia	Decision	5	3:00
2004-04-23	Win	(New Zealand) Andrew Peck	K-1 Battle of Anzacs 2004	Auckland, New Zealand	KO (right hook)	1	
2004-03-19	Win	(New Zealand) Sio Vitale	Knees of Fury VI	Adelaide, Australia	TKO	4	
2003-12-20	Win	(South Korea) Hyo-Phil Lee	Into the Fire 2/2	Seoul, South Korea	KO		
2003-11-07	Draw	(Australia) Chris Chrisopoulides	Knees of Fury V	Adelaide, Australia	Decision draw	5	3:00
2003-07-27	Loss	(Papua New Guinea) Mitch O'Hello	K-1 World Grand Prix 2003 in Melbourne	Melbourne, Australia	KO (right hook)	1	1:12
2003-06-15	Win	(Sweden) Jorgen Kruth	Knees of Fury IV	Adelaide, Australia	TKO (Elbow)	1	
2003-04-24	Win	(Samoa) Clay Aumitagi	License 2 Thrill	Australia	TKO (Corner Stoppage)	3	
2003-03-14	Win	(Kazakhstan) Askhab Gorbakhov	WMC Heavyweight World Title	Adelaide, Australia			
Wins WMC Heavyweight World Title.
2002-11-05	Win	(Japan) Koji Iga	Shootboxing: The Age of "S" Vol.5	Japan	TKO (Referee Stoppage)	3	1:40
2002-09-21	Win	(New Zealand) Daniel Paora	KB4	Rooty Hill, Australia	TKO (Referee Stoppage)	3	
2002-06-14	Win	(Thailand) Louk Thong	South Australia vs Thailand	Adelaide, Australia	TKO		
2002-05-07	Win	(Thailand) Nokweed Devy	Chaweng Stadium	Ko Samui, Thailand	KO (High kick)	4	
2002-04-00	Win	(Thailand) Nokweed Devy	Kanchanaburi Stadium	Thailand	KO (punches)	2	
2002-04-09	Win	(Thailand) Louk Thong	WMC Cruiserweight World Title, Chewang Stadium	Bangkok, Thailand	KO (punches)	4	
Wins WMC Cruiserweight World Title.
2001-12-23	Win	(Sudan) Faisal Zakaria	WMC Light Heavyweight World Title	Bangkok, Thailand	TKO (low kicks)	3	
Wins WMC Light Heavyweight World Title.
2001-09-01	Win	(Australia) Steve McKinnon	JNI Promotions, Star City	Australia	KO (left Highkick)	3	1:52
2001-05-12	Win	(Australia) Nathan Corbett	Light Heavyweight Super 8, Final	Brisbane, Australia	Decision	3	3:00
Wins Super 8 Tournament title.
2001-05-12	Win	(Australia) Aaron Boyes	Light Heavyweight Super 8, Semi-final	Brisbane, Australia			
2001-05-12	Win	(Australia) Matt McConachy	Light Heavyweight Super 8, Quarter Final	Brisbane, Australia			
2000-00-00	Win	(Australia) John Wyborne	Thailand vs West Australia	Perth, Australia	KO		
1999-00-00	Win	(Australia) Brett Dalton	Thai Consul General's Cup	Perth, Australia	Decision	5	3:00
1998-08-14	Win	(Australia) Liam O'Regan	South Australian Title	Adelaide, Australia	TKO (low kicks)	4	
Legend: Win Loss Draw/No contest Notes

== Mixed martial arts record ==
Professional record breakdown
3 matches	1 win	2 losses
By knockout	1	1
By submission	0	1

Res.	Record	Opponent	Method	Event	Date	Round	Time	Location	Notes
Loss	1–2	Michał Andryszak	TKO (punches)	KSW 26	22 March 2014	1	1:06	Warsaw, Poland	
Loss	1–1	Marcin Rozalski	Submission (rear-naked choke)	KSW 24	29 September 2013	1	–	Lodz, Poland	
Win	1–0	Leamy Tato	TKO (head kick & punches)	MMA Downunder 4	21 September 2013	1	2:27	Adelaide, Australia	

== See also ==
- List of male kickboxers
- List of K-1 Events
