= Koichi (kickboxer) =

Japanese kickboxer (1980–2018)

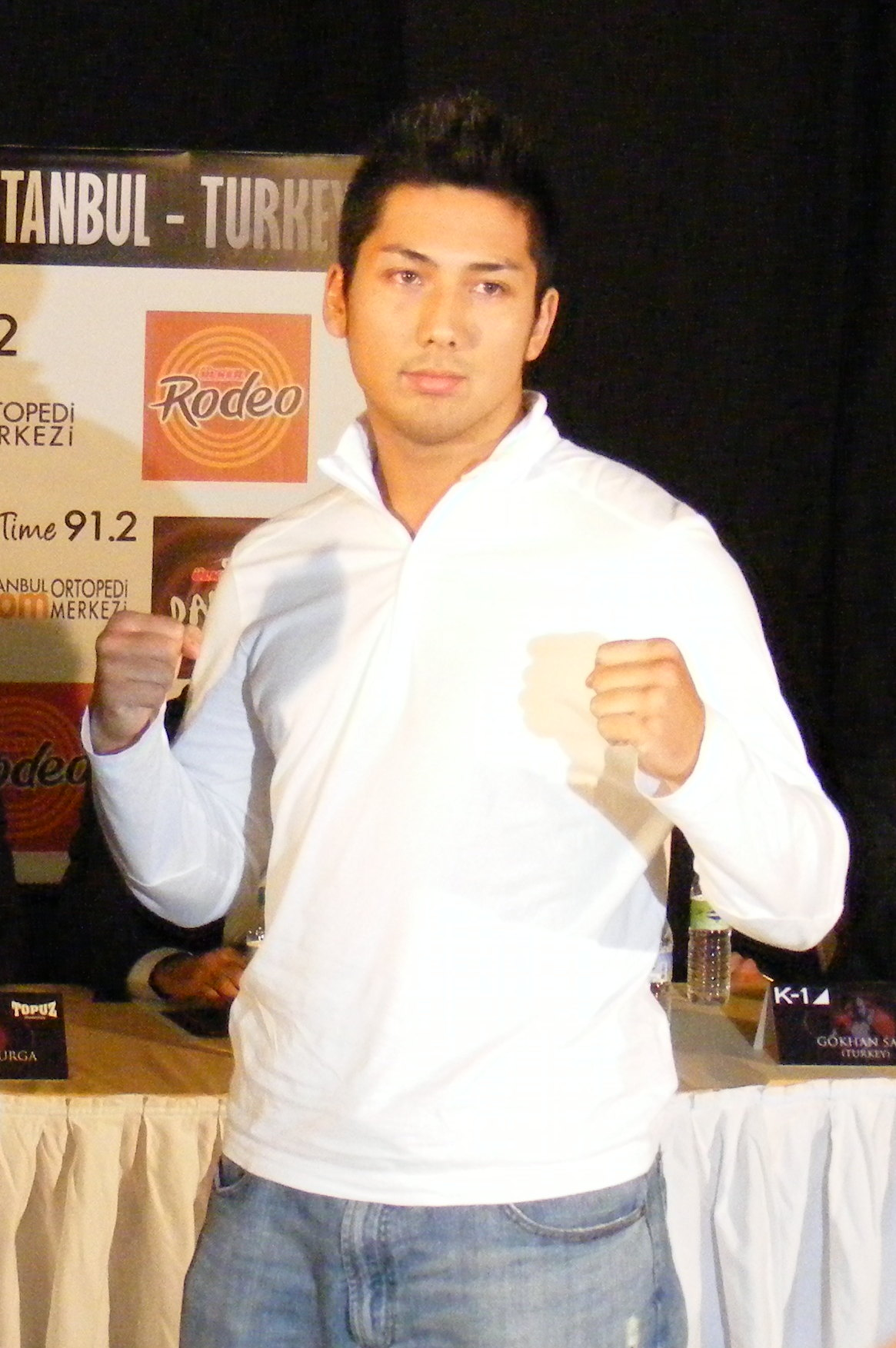
- Koichi in 2007
- Born: Koichi Watanabe; October 26, 1980; Niigata, Japan
- Died: 7 April 2018 (aged 37)
- Native name: 渡邉 浩一
- Other names: KOICHI
- Nationality: (Japan) Japanese
- Height: 1.86 m (6 ft 1 in)
- Weight: 100 kg (220 lb; 15 st 10 lb)
- Division: Heavyweight
- Style: Kickboxing
- Team: Bungeling Bay Spirit; Team Spirit
- Trainer: Nicholas Pettas
- Years active: 2008–2018

Kickboxing record
- Total: 44
- Wins: 31
- By knockout: 18
- Losses: 12
- By knockout: 4
- Draws: 1
- Last updated on: April 7, 2018

Koichi Watanabe (Japanese: コウイチ) (26 October 1980 - 7 April 2018), better known as Koichi Pettas or simply KOICHI, was a Japanese heavyweight kickboxer competing in K-1, It's Showtime and GLORY.

== Biography and career ==
Koichi gained recognition fighting in organizations like RISE and MARS, then went on to win the M-1 Heavyweight Muaythai title in 2009 and the WPMF Japan Heavyweight Muaythai title in 2010. Having spent most of his career at heavyweight, Koichi dropped to light-heavyweight following back-to-back losses to Jerome Le Banner in GLORY events. He retired from active competition in November 2017 to become a trainer. Koichi was killed in a traffic accident on April 7, 2018. He collided with a car while driving a scooter in Tokyo. He was declared dead shortly upon arrival at the hospital.

== Titles ==
- 2010 WPMF Japan Heavyweight Muaythai champion
- 2009 M-1 Heavyweight Muaythai champion

== Kickboxing record ==
Kickboxing Record
31 Wins (18 KO's, 13 decisions), 12 Losses, 1 Draw
Date	Result	Opponent	Event	Location	Method	Round	Time	Record
2017-11-23	Loss	(Morocco) Ibrahim El Bouni	K-1 World GP 2017 Heavyweight Championship Tournament, Quarter Finals	Saitama, Japan	KO (Left Hook)	1	0:20	31-12-1
2017-04-22	Win	(Japan) K-Jee	K-1 World GP 2017 Super Bantamweight Championship	Tokyo, Japan	KO	3		31-11-1
2016-09-19	Loss	(Japan) Makoto Uehara	K-1 World GP 2016 -60kg World Tournament	Tokyo, Japan	Decision (Unanimous)	3	3:00	30-11-1
2015-11-4	Win	(Japan) Nobu Hayashi	Enishi	Tokyo, Japan	KO	1	1:24	30-10-1
2015-8-1	Win	(Japan) Hiromi Amada	Blade 2	Tokyo, Japan	Decision (Unanimous)	3	3:00	29-10-1
2014-12-29	Win	(Japan) Raoumaru	Blade 1	Tokyo, Japan	Decision (Unanimous)	3	3:00	28-10-1
2014-9-28	Win	(Japan) GORIsenoo	REBELS 30	Tokyo, Japan	KO	1	1:47	27-10-1
2013-06-22	Loss	(United States) Randy Blake	Glory 9: New York - 95 kg Slam Tournament, Reserve Bout	New York City, New York, USA	Decision (unanimous)	3	3:00	26-10-1
2013-05-03	Loss	(France) Jérôme Le Banner	Glory 8: Tokyo	Tokyo, Japan	Decision (unanimous)	3	3:00	26-9-1
2012-12-31	Loss	(France) Jérôme Le Banner	Glory 4: Tokyo	Saitama, Japan	KO (Right Hook)	3	2:48	26-8-1
2012-10-06	Win	(United States) Mark Miller	Glory 2: Brussels	Brussels, Belgium	KO (Right Cross)	2		26-7-1
2012-7-29	Win	(Japan) Ryuta Noji	IT'S SHOWTIME JAPAN countdown-2	Tokyo, Japan	KO (3 Punches/Knockdowns)	1	2:54	25-7-1
2012-5-20	Win	(Japan) Jonhan Kim	SHUKEN VI - IT'S SHOWTIME Japan	Tokyo, Japan	Decision (3-0)	3	3:00	24-7-1
2012-01-22	Loss	(Japan) Toshio Matsumoto	REBELS.10 - IT'S SHOWTIME Japan	Tokyo, Japan	Decision (3-0)	3	3:00	23-7-1
Fight was for the vacant IT'S SHOWTIME Japan 95kg title.
2011-09-04	Win	(Japan) Yoichi Babaguchi	TITANS NEOS X	Tokyo, Japan	KO (Left hook)	1	0:51	23-6-1
2011-07-18	Win	(South Korea) Nam II	IT'S SHOWTIME JAPAN countdown-1	Tokyo, Japan	KO (Left hook)	2	0:46	22-6-1
2011-06-12	Win	(New Zealand) Andrew Peck	M-1 Fairtex Challenge	Tokyo, Japan	KO (Knees and punches)	3	1:01	21-6-1
2010-12-01	Win	(Japan) Hiromi Amada	Fujiwara Festival 2010	Tokyo, Japan	Decision (3-0)	5	3:00	20-6-1
Wins WPMF Japan Heavyweight Muaythai title.
2010-09-12	Win	(Japan) Fuck Kishida	M-1 Fairtex Challenge	Tokyo, Japan	KO (Knee strike)	2	1:20	19-6-1
2010-06-27	Win	(Japan) Eiji Ikeno	M-1 Fairtex Challenge	Tokyo, Japan	KO (Knee strike)	2	2:34	18-6-1
2010-06-06	Win	(Japan) Ryo Takigawa	M-1 Fairtex Challenge	Tokyo, Japan	KO (High kick)	2	0:19	17-6-1
2009-09-08	Draw	(Japan) Yuuki Niimura		Tokyo, Japan	Decision Draw (1-0)	3	3:00	16-6-1
2009-08-02	Win	(Japan) Yusuke Sakashita	K-1 World Grand Prix 2009 in Seoul	Seoul, Korea	Decision	3	3:00	16-6
2009-05-06	Loss	(India) Singh Jaideep	J-Network Get Real in J-World 2nd	Japan	Decision (3-0)	5	3:00	15-6
Fight was for the J-Network Heavyweight title.
2009-03-29	Win	(Iran) Prince Ali	TITANS NEOS 5	Tokyo, Japan	Decision (3-0)	3	3:00	15-5
2009-01-18	Win	(Japan) Keigo Takamori	M-1 Fairtex Challenge	Tokyo, Japan	KO (Body kick)	4	1:33	14-5
Wins M-1 Heavyweight Muaythai title.
2009-08-09	Loss	(Netherlands) Rico Verhoeven	K-1 World GP 2008 Hawaii	Honolulu, Hawai	Decision (3-0)	3	3:00	13-5
2008-05-23	Win	(Japan) Shintaro Kiso	Smokers	Tokyo, Japan	KO (Uppercut)	1	2:31	13-4
2008-08-04	Win	(Japan) Kuniyosh	TITANS	Tokyo, Japan	Decision	3	3:00	12-4
2007-11-02	Loss	(France) Freddy Kemayo	K-1 Fighting Network Turkey 2007	Istanbul, Turkey	TKO (Doctor stoppage)	4	1:50	11-4
2007-09-26	Loss	(Brazil) Fabiano Aoki	J-Network Tour Championship of J 2nd	Tokyo, Japan	Ext R. Decision (3-0)	4	3:00	11-3
Fight was for the J-Network Heavyweight Tournament title.
2007-09-26	Win	(Japan) Niimura Yuki	J-Network Championship Tour of J 2nd	Tokyo, Japan	Decision	3	3:00	11-2
2007-08-03	Win	(Japan) Koya Hasegawa	J-Network Championship Tour of J 1st	Tokyo, Japan	Decision	3	3:00	10-2
2007	Win	(Japan) Hiromitsu Takayama	MA Kickboxing	Tokyo, Japan	Decision (3-0)	3	3:00	9-2
2007-03-24	Loss	(New Zealand) Andrew Peck	HEAT 3	Nagoya, Japan	Decision (3-0)	3	3:00	8-2
2006-12-22	Win	(Korea) Lee Jea Hun	MARS 6 Rapid Fire	Yokohama, Japan	Decision (3-0)	3	3:00	8-1
2006-08-26	Win	(Korea) Seol Bo Kyung	MARS 4 New Deal	Tokyo, Japan	KO (Left high kick)	1	0:53	7-1
2006-07-31	Win	(Japan) Masashi Aoyagi	RISE XXVIII	Tokyo, Japan	Decision (3-0)	3	3:00	6-1
2006-03-26	Loss	(United States) Alex Roberts	RISE G-Bazooka Tournament '06	Tokyo, Japan	KO (Right high kick)	1	2:30	5-1
2006-03-26	Win	(Brazil) Fabiano Aoki	RISE G-Bazooka Tournament '06	Tokyo, Japan	KO (Left hook)	1	2:04	5-0
2005-11-27	Win	(Japan) Yoichi Uchida	RISE XX	Tokyo, Japan	TKO (Doctor Stoppage)	1	2:44	4-0
2005-08-13	Win	(Japan) Wataru Suda	AJKF Cross Fire	Tokyo, Japan	KO (Right lowkick)	3	1:55	3-0
2005-06-19	Win	(Japan) Hiroshi Sakai	RISE G-Bazooka Tournament '05	Tokyo, Japan	KO (Knee to the body)	3	2:29	2-0
2005-04-24	Win	(Japan) Mr. Kamikaze	RISE XIV	Tokyo, Japan	Ext R. Decision (2-1)	4	3:00	1-0
Legend: Win Loss Draw/No contest Notes

== See also ==
- List of male kickboxers
- List of K-1 Events
