= Fabiano Aoki =

Brazilian kickboxer

- Born: Edilson Fabiano Goncalves Aoki; 21 November 1978 (age 47); Santa Izabel Do Para
- Other names: Fabiano Cyclone
- Nationality: Brazilian, Japanese
- Height: 1.87 m (6 ft 1 1/2 in)
- Weight: 100 kg (220 lb; 15 st 10 lb)
- Division: Heavyweight
- Style: Kickboxing, Karate, Muay Thai
- Stance: Orthodox
- Fighting out of: Tokyo, Japan
- Team: TARGET
- Trainer: Takashi Ito

Kickboxing record
- Total: 37
- Wins: 27
- By knockout: 14
- Losses: 10

Mixed martial arts record
- Total: 2
- Losses: 1
- By knockout: 1
- No contests: 1

Other information
- Mixed martial arts record from Sherdog

Fabiano "Cyclone" Goncalves Aoki (Japanese: ファビアーノ 青木; born on 21 November 1978) is a Brazilian former heavyweight kickboxer, fighting out of TARGET team in Japan. He was J-Network tournament champion, RISE, WPMF, HEAT and WBC Muaythai champion, competed in the K-1 and is currently signed to GLORY.

== Biography and career ==
On June 9, 2012, Aoki replaced Igor Jurković and challenged Cristian Bosch for his WBC Muaythai heavyweight world title. The fight happened in Bangkok, Thailand at Singha Battle For The Belts event. Aoki dominated the fight and KOed Bosch in the second round via flying knee.

In 2012, he signed for GLORY. He made his promotional debut in Brussels on 6 October 2012 at Glory 2: Brussels where he lost via unanimous decision to Filip Verlinden, suffering a knockdown with a left hook in the second round.

On April 6, 2013, he lost to Mourad Bouzidi via TKO due to corner stoppage in round two at Glory 6: Istanbul in Istanbul, Turkey.

On August 31, 2022, Aoki was named a WBC Muay Thai Global Ambassador. He was inducted into the WBC Muay Thai Hall of Fame class of 2023.

After retiring from competition, Aoki founded and currently operates Cyclone Muay Thai in Surprise, Arizona, where he coaches fighters and teaches Muay Thai.

== Titles ==
- 2012 WBC Muaythai Heavyweight World Champion
- 2012 HEAT Kickboxing Heavyweight Champion
- 2010 WPMF World Super-heavyweight Champion
- 2008 RISE Heavyweight Champion
- 2007 J-Network Heavyweight Tournament Champion

== Kickboxing record ==
Professional kickboxing record
Date	Result	Opponent	Event	Location	Method	Round	Time
2013-04-06	Loss	(Tunisia) Mourad Bouzidi	Glory 6: Istanbul	Istanbul, Turkey	TKO (corner stoppage)	2	
2012-10-06	Loss	(Belgium) Filip Verlinden	Glory 2: Brussels	Brussels, Belgium	Decision (unanimous)	3	3:00
2012-06-09	Win	(Argentina) Cristian Bosch	Singha Battle For The Belts	Bangkok, Thailand	KO (jumping knee)	2	2:28
Wins WBC Muaythai Heavyweight World title.
2012-04-08	Win	(Japan) Hiromi Amada	HEAT 22	Japan	KO (knee)	2	1:39
Wins HEAT Kickboxing Heavyweight title.
2011-11-23	Loss	(Czech Republic) Jan Soukup	RISE 85: RISE Heavyweight Tournament 2011, Quarter Finals	Tokyo, Japan	Decision (majority)	3	3:00
2011-07-23	Win	(Japan) Joey Kaputai	RISE 80	Tokyo, Japan	KO (right hook)	1	
2011-04-29	Win	(Iran) Prince Ali	J-Network Time to Change the Kick by J-Spirit 2nd	Japan	TKO (foot injury)	1	0:22
2010-12-30	Win	(Australia) Andrew Peck	SRC - Soul of Fight	Tokyo, Japan	TKO (cut)	2	
2010-09-12	Win	(Japan) Gotoku Onda	M-1 Fairtex Muay Thai Challenge vol. 3	Tokyo, Japan	KO (straight left)	2	2:27
2010-03-21	Win	(Japan) Yuki Niimura	M-1 Fairtex Muay Thai Challenge vol. 1	Tokyo, Japan	Decision (unanimous)	5	3:00
Wins WPMF World Super-heavyweight championship.
2009-09-13	Win	(Thailand) Bank Fairtex	M-1 Fairtex Muay Thai Challenge vol. 3	Tokyo, Japan	Decision (majority)	3	3:00
2008-11-30	Win	(India) Singh Jaideep	R.I.S.E. 51	Japan	Ext R. decision (unanimous)	4	3:00
2008-07-04	Win	(Japan) Magnum Sakai	R.I.S.E. 48 - The King of Gladiators	Japan	TKO (3 knockdowns)	2	2:31
Wins R.I.S.E. heavyweight championship.
2008-05-11	Win	(Japan) Moriguchi Dragon	Rise 46 - The King of Gladiators	Japan	Decision (unanimous)	3	3:00
2008-04-11	Loss	(India) Singh Jaideep	J-Network "Let's Kick with J the 2nd"	Japan	Decision (Unanimous)	5	3:00
For J-Network heavyweight championship.
2007-12-16	Win	(India) Singh Jaideep	R.I.S.E. Dead or Alive tournament 07	Japan	KO (right hook)	1	2:45
2007-09-26	Win	(Japan) Koichi Pettas	J-Network Tour Championship of J 2nd	Tokyo, Japan	Ext R. decision (unanimous)	4	3:00
Wins J-Network Heavyweight Tournament title.
2007-09-26	Win	(Japan) Yuzo Matsumoto	J-Network Championship Tour of J 2nd	Tokyo, Japan	Decision (unanimous)	3	3:00
2007-08-03	Win	(Japan) Takashi Noboru	J-Network Championship Tour of J 1st	Tokyo, Japan	Decision (unanimous)	3	3:00
2006-05-28	Win	(Japan) Yoichi Uchida	R.I.S.E. XXVI	Tokyo, Japan	Decision (unanimous)	3	3:00
2006-03-26	Loss	(Japan) Koichi Pettas	RISE G-Bazooka Tournament '06, quarter finals	Tokyo, Japan	KO (left hook)	1	2:04
2005-06-19	Loss	(Japan) Magnum Sakai	R.I.S.E. G-Bazooka Tournament '05, semi finals	Japan	Decision (split)	3	3:00
2005-06-19	Win	(Japan) Junichi Sawayashiki	R.I.S.E. G-Bazooka Tournament '05, quarter finals	Japan	Decision (unanimous)	3	3:00
2005-04-24	Win	(Japan) Masanobu Yamanaka	R.I.S.E. XIV	Japan	Decision (unanimous)	3	3:00
2005-02-20	Loss	(Japan) Tomokazu Kamiya	R.I.S.E. XIII	Japan	Decision (majority)	3	3:00
2004-12-19	Win	(Japan) Serada Takanori	R.I.S.E. DEAD or ALIVE Tournament '04	Japan	TKO (arm injury)	2	2:05
2004-07-04	Loss	(Japan) Aoyagi Masahide	R.I.S.E. The Law of The Ring	Japan	TKO (3 knockdowns/low kick)	3	1:35
2004-04-29	Win	(Japan) Taichi Furuta	R.I.S.E. VII	Japan	KO (right uppercut)	2	2:51
2004-03-27	Win	(Japan) Hiroshi Tajima	K-1 World Grand Prix 2004 in Saitama	Saitama, Japan	Decision (majority)	3	3:00
2004-02-15	Loss	(Japan) Great Kusatsu	K-1 Burning 2004	Okinawa, Japan	KO (kick)	1	2:53
2003-11-16	Win	(Japan) Manabu Ito	IKUSA Young Gunners 2	Japan	Decision (split)	3	3:00
2003-08-30	Win	(Japan) Atsushi Sato	IKUSA Futur Fighter IKUSA 4	Japan	Decision (unanimous)	3	3:00
2003-08-23	Loss	(Japan) Riyu	Taekwondo Game 2003 Grand Prix	Japan	Points	3	2:00
2003-04-27	Win	(Scotland) Stewart Fulton	R.I.S.E.	Japan	TKO (3 knockdowns)	1	1:57
2003-02-23	Win	(Japan) Ishikura Ken	R.I.S.E.	Japan	KO (knee)	1	1:25
Legend: Win Loss Draw/no contest Notes

== Mixed martial arts record ==
Professional record breakdown
2 matches	0 wins	1 loss
By knockout	0	1
No contests	1	

Res.	Record	Opponent	Method	Event	Date	Round	Time	Location	Notes
Loss	0–1 (1)	Yuji Sakuragi	TKO (knee injury)	MARS 6 - Rapid Fire	22 Dec 2006	2	1:55	Yokohama, Japan	
NC	0–0 (1)	Yuji Sakuragi	NC (groin kick)	MARS 5 - Marching On	28 Oct 2006	1	0:17	Tokyo, Japan	MMA debut.

== See also ==
- List of male kickboxers
