= Ricardo van den Bos =

Dutch martial artist

- Born: Ricardo van den Bos; 17 November 1984 (age 41); Zwolle, Netherlands
- Other names: The Boss
- Height: 1.93 m (6 ft 4 in)
- Weight: 103 kg (227 lb; 16.2 st)
- Division: Heavyweight
- Style: Muay Thai
- Stance: Orthodox
- Team: Mike's Gym

Kickboxing record
- Total: 34
- Wins: 12
- By knockout: 8
- Losses: 22
- Last updated on: November 9, 2013

Ricardo van den Bos (born 17 November 1984) is a Dutch kickboxer and boxer, fighting out of Zwolle. He is a four time WBC International Muay Thai Heavyweight Champion and the Dutch Amateur Boxing Heavyweight Champion of 2010.

== Career ==
Van den Bos was initially set to fight Marvin Eastman for the vacant WPMF World Super Heavyweight (+95.454 kg/210.4 lb) Championship at Muaythai Superfight in Pattaya, Thailand on May 13, 2013. The event was pushed back to June 14, 2013, however, and he KO'd Eastman to take the belt.

He was on the receiving end of a brutal first round KO from Raul Cătinaș the SuperKombat World Grand Prix 2013 Final Elimination in Ploiești, Romania on November 9, 2013.

== Titles ==
- 2013 WPMF World Super Heavyweight Champion
- 2010 Dutch Amateur Boxing Heavyweight Champion
- 2006 WBC Muaythai International Heavyweight Champion (3 title defenses)
- 2001 Dutch Amateur Boxing Super Middleweight Champion

== Kickboxing record ==
Kickboxing record
wins ( KO's), losses, draw
Date	Result	Opponent	Event	Location	Method	Round	Time
2018-03-25	Loss	(Netherlands) Fred Sikking	WFL: Wildcard Tournament, Semi Finals	Almere, Netherlands	Decision	3	3:00
2013-11-09	Loss	(Romania) Raul Cătinaș	SuperKombat World Grand Prix 2013 Final Elimination	Ploiești, Romania	KO (left hook)	1	1:40
2013-06-14	Win	(United States) Marvin Eastman	Muaythai Superfight	Pattaya, Thailand	TKO (punches)	2	
Wins interim WPMF World Super Heavyweight Championship.
2012-11-24	Loss	(Netherlands) Michael Duut	2 the MAXX	Hoogeveen, Netherlands	KO	3	
2012-01-28	Loss	(Australia) Ben Edwards	It's Showtime 2012 in Leeuwarden	Leeuwarden, Netherlands	Decision (3-0)	3	3:00
2011-10-01	Loss	(Ukraine) Pavel Zhuravlev	SuperKombat World Grand Prix III 2011, Semi Finals	Brăila, Romania	Decision (3-0)	3	3:00
2011-03-06	Win	(Netherlands) Raymond Bonte	Fightingstars presents: It's Showtime Sporthallen Zuid	Amsterdam, Netherlands	KO (Right high kick)	1	
2010-12-17	Loss	(Montenegro) Goran Radonjic	Podgorica Fight Night	Podgorica, Montenegro	KO	1	2:18
2010-10-24	Loss	(Netherlands) Raemon Welboren	Gala Top Team Beverwijk	Beverwijk, Netherlands	KO		
2010-09-12	Loss	(Netherlands) Rico Verhoeven	Fightingstars presents: It's Showtime 2010	Amsterdam, Netherlands	Decision (3-0)	3	3:00
2010-04-10	Loss	(Lithuania) Sergej Maslobojev	K-1 WORLD GP 2010 in Vilnius	Vilnius, Lithuania	Decision (3-0)	3	3:00
2010-03-23	Loss	(Netherlands) Brian Douwes	K-1 World MAX 2010 West Europe Tournament	Utrecht, Netherlands	Decision (3-0)	3	3:00
2010-01-02	Loss	(Sudan) Faisal Zakaria	Battle at the Beach Show	Pattaya, Thailand	Decision (2-1)	5	3:00
Loses WBC Muay Thai International Heavyweight Championship.
2009-10-02	Win	(Netherlands) Koos Wessels	Swolla Soldiers	Zwolle, Netherlands	Decision (3-0)	3	3:00
2009-01-02	Win	(Iran) Abbas Astraki	Battle at the Beach Show	Pattaya, Thailand	KO	3	
Defends WBC Muay Thai International Heavyweight Championship.
2009-04-11	Win	(Turkey) Mutlu Karabulut	Amsterdam Fight Club	Amsterdam, Netherlands	TKO	1	
2008-07-05	Loss	(Netherlands) Hesdy Gerges	Amsterdam Fightclub	Amsterdam, Netherlands	Decision (3-0)	3	3:00
For WFCA Dutch Thaiboxing Super Heavyweight Championship.
2008-01-04	Win	(Poland) Tomasz Wozade	Battle at the Beach Show	Pattaya, Thailand	Decision (3-0)	5	
Defends WBC Muay Thai International Heavyweight Championship.
2007-09-08	Loss	(United States) Shane del Rosario	World Championship Muayhthai	Las Vegas, USA	KO (Knee strike)	2	3:00
For WBC Muay Thai World Heavyweight Championship.
2007-05-25	Loss	(Russia) Magomed Magomedov	K-1 Ringmasters Fight Night	Istanbul, Turkey	TKO	3	
2007-03-08	Win	(Iran)	San Jai Thai Su Jai Tai	Bangkok, Thailand	KO (Right high kick)	1	
2007-02-02	Win	(Morocco) Nourdin Zidani	It's Showtime Trophy	Zwolle, Netherlands	KO		
2007-01-03	Win	(Russia) Malex Gadzhiev	Battle at the Beach Show	Pattaya, Thailand	Decision (2-1)	5	3:00
Defends WBC Muay Thai International Heavyweight Championship.
2006-09-23	Win	(Netherlands) Koos Wessels	North against South	Leek, Netherlands	KO	1	
2006-04-08	Loss	(Bosnia and Herzegovina) Dzevad Poturak	K-1 Italy Grand Prix 2006 in Milan	Milan, Italy	Decision (3-0)	3	3:00
2006-02-12	Loss	(Suriname) Ashwin Balrak	Dancing With the Fighters	Amsterdam, Netherlands	Decision (3-0)	3	3:00
2005-12-10	Loss	(Australia) Peter Graham	K-1 Kings of Oceania 2005 Round 3	Auckland, New Zealand	KO (Punches)	1	1:19
2005-10-08	Loss	(New Zealand) Rony Sefo	K-1 Kings of Oceania 2005 Round 2	Auckland, New Zealand	Decision (3-0)	3	3:00
2005-07-10	Loss	(New Zealand) Jay Hepi	K-1 Kings of Oceania 2005 Round 1	Auckland, New Zealand	Ext.R Decision	4	3:00
2005-06-25	Loss	(New Zealand) Paula Mataele	K-1 Challenge 2005 Xplosion X	Auckland, New Zealand	TKO	2	
2005-05-22	Loss	(Poland) Paul Slowinski	Knees Of Fury 10, Finals	Australia	TKO (Corner stoppage)	1	0:05
For WMC World Heavyweight GP Championship.
2005-05-22	Win	(New Zealand) Hiriwa Te Rangi	Knees Of Fury 10, Semi Finals	Australia	Decision (3-0)	3	3:00
2005-05-22	Win	(New Zealand) Peter Sampson	Knees Of Fury 10, Quarter Finals	Australia	TKO	1	
2004-05-22	Loss	(New Zealand) Jason Suttie	K-1 Challenge 2004 Oceania vs World	Gold Coast, Australia	Decision (3-0)	3	3:00
Legend: Win Loss Draw/No contest Notes
