= Andrew Peck =

New Zealand kickboxer

- Born: 3 July 1973 (age 53); Auckland, New Zealand
- Other names: Golden Boy, Powerhouse
- Nationality: New Zealander
- Height: 1.91 m (6 ft 3 in)
- Weight: 112 kg (247 lb; 17.6 st)
- Style: Kickboxing

Kickboxing record
- Total: 92
- Wins: 71
- By knockout: 28
- Losses: 19
- Draws: 2

Andrew Peck (born 3 July 1973, in New Zealand) is a New Zealand kickboxer. He is the 2010 WMC Super Heavyweight Intercontinental Champion.

== Biography ==
Originally from Auckland, New Zealand Andrew Peck began training Muaythai at the age of 18. One year later, he added karate to his strengths. Peck moved to Japan to live and train. He worked his way through the amateur ranks of kickboxing and karate until his impressive professional debut in 2000 when he won the K-1 New Zealand Grand Prix by three first-round knockouts.

In his next tournament, the K-1 World Grand Prix 2002 Preliminary Melbourne, Peck made it to the semi-finals only to be beaten by Mark Hunt. He bounced back by winning the WKBF South Pacific Super Heavyweight Kickboxing Championship in 2001. In 2002, he made his K-1 Japan debut. By 2004 he was the WMC New Zealand Super Heavyweight title holder and decided to retire only to return to the K-1 circuit in 2006. Still living up to his nickname he won the K-1 Kings of Oceania title in 2007.

He is married and has two children.

== Championships and Accomplishments ==
- 2010 WMC Intercontinental Super Heavyweight Champion
- 2009 WPMF New Zealand Super Heavyweight Champion
- 2007 K-1 Kings of Oceania Round 1 Champion
- 2004 WMC New Zealand Super Heavyweight Champion
- 2002 K-1 World Grand Prix Preliminary Melbourne Finalist
- 2001 WKBF South Pacific Super Heavyweight Kickboxing Champion
- 2000 K-1 New Zealand Grand Prix Champion

== Kickboxing record ==
Kickboxing record
71 wins ( 28 KO's), 19 losses, 2draw
Date	Result	Opponent	Event	Location	Method	Round	Time
2024-12-15	Win	(Brazil) Mamuti	Hoost Cup Kings Nagoya 16	Nagoya, Japan	KO	3	2:05
2024-07-28	Draw	(Japan) Rikiya Yamashita	Hoost Cup Kings Osaka 6	Osaka, Japan	Decision Draw	4	3:00
2014-09-07	Win	(Japan) Ryo Aitaka	HEAT 33	Nagoya, Japan	TKO	1	2:06
2013-10-18	Win	(New Zealand) Mika Maliefulu	Heavyweight War	Auckland, New Zealand			
2013-04-13	Win	(New Zealand) Tafa Misipati	King of the Ring	Auckland, New Zealand	Decision (3-0)	3	3:00
2011-06-23	Loss	(Japan) Koichi Watanabe	M-1 Fairtex Challenge	Tokyo, Japan	KO	3	
2010-12-30	Loss	(Brazil) Fabiano Aoki	SRC - Soul of Fight	Tokyo, Japan	TKO (Cut)	2	
2010-09-03	Win	(Sudan) Faisal Zakaria	Universal Soldier	Auckland, New Zealand	KO	4	0:45
Wins WMC Intercontinental Super Heavyweight Championship.
2009-11-07	Win	(New Zealand) Vini Mahoni	Pathai Promotion	Auckland, New Zealand	TKO (Corner stoppage)	3	
Wins WPMF New Zealand Super Heavyweight Championship.
2009-08-29	Loss	(Australia) Ben Edwards	World Domination II	Canberra, Australia	TKO (Referee stoppage)	1	2:24
For Edward's ISKA World Super Heavyweight Championship.
2009-06-20	Win	(Brazil) Eduardo Maiorino	New Zealand vs. Brazil	Auckland, New Zealand			
2008-11-25	Loss	(Australia) Thor Hoopman	Planet Battle GP 2008, Semi Finals	Hong Kong	KO	2	
2008-11-25	Win	(United Kingdom) Chris Knowles	Planet Battle GP 2008, Quarter Finals	Hong Kong	Decision	3	3:00
2008-07-13	Loss	(Iran) Prince Ali	HEAT 7	Nagoya, Japan	KO	2	2:03
2008-06-25	Win	(Brazil) Bruno Schwartz	Planet Battle I	Wan Chai, Hong Kong	KO (Left highkick)	2	
2008-02-08	Loss	(Croatia) Stipan Radić	KO World Series 2008 in Oceania, Semi Finals	Auckland, New Zealand	KO	2	
2007-11-25	Win	(Japan) Ryuta Noji	HEAT 5	Nagoya, Japan	Decision (3-0)	3	3:00
2007-04-14	Win	(New Zealand) Felise Leniu	K-1 Kings of Oceania 2007 Round 1	Auckland, New Zealand	TKO	2	
Wins K-1 Kings of Oceania 2007 Round 1 title.
2007-04-14	Win	(New Zealand) Leamy Tato	K-1 Kings of Oceania 2007 Round 1	Auckland, New Zealand	TKO	2	
2007-04-14	Win	(New Zealand) Charlie Smiler	K-1 Kings of Oceania 2007 Round 1	Auckland, New Zealand	TKO	2	
2007-03-24	Win	(Japan) Koichi Watanabe	HEAT 3	Nagoya, Japan	Decision (3-0)	3	3:00
2006-11-18	Win	Matt Samoa	K-1 Kings of Oceania 2006 Round 3	Auckland, New Zealand	TKO (3 knockdowns)	2	2:50
2006-09-16	Loss	(Australia) Peter Graham	K-1 Kings of Oceania 2006 Round 2	Auckland, New Zealand	TKO (Low Kicks)	2	
2006-06-24	Loss	(New Zealand) Doug Viney	K-1 Kings of Oceania 2006 Round 1	Auckland, New Zealand	Decision	3	3:00
2005-08-18	Loss	(Poland) Paul Slowinski	Knees of Fury 10 WMC World Heavyweight GP, Quarter Final	Australia	KO (Right hook)	1	2:00
2005-06-24	Loss	(New Zealand) Daniel Tai	New Zealand vs. Russia	Auckland, New Zealand	Decision (0-3)	3	3:00
2004-04-23	Loss	(Poland) Paul Slowinski	K-1 Battle of Anzacs 2004	Auckland, New Zealand	KO (Right hook)	1	
2003-11-07	Loss	(New Zealand) Hiriwa Te Rangi	K-1 World GP 2004 Preliminary: New Zealand, Semi Finals	Auckland, New Zealand	KO	3	
2003-11-07	Win	(New Zealand) Clay Auimatagi	K-1 World GP 2004 Preliminary: New Zealand, Quarter Finals	Auckland, New Zealand	Decision (3-0)	3	3:00
2003-09-12	Loss	(Croatia) ^{[a]} Danijel Marhold	K-1 Final Fight	Split, Croatia	KO	2	0:30
2003-07-27	Loss	(New Zealand) Jason Suttie	K-1 World Grand Prix 2003 in Melbourne, Semi Finals	Melbourne, Australia	KO (Left Hook)	1	1:02
2003-07-27	Win	(New Zealand) Auckland Aumitagi	K-1 World Grand Prix 2003 in Melbourne, Quarter Finals	Melbourne, Australia	TKO (Right Knee, 2 Knockdowns)	2	1:09
2003-05-29	Win	(Australia) Terry Tuteru	Kio at the Ocean City	Melbourne, Australia	KO	4	
2003-04-11	Loss	(Croatia) Josip Bodrožić	K-1 Lord of the Rings	Auckland, New Zealand	KO (Punch)	1	
2002-11-08	Loss	(New Zealand) Doug Viney	K-1 New Zealand Grand Prix 2003 in Auckland, Semi Finals	Auckland, New Zealand	Decision	3	3:00
2002-11-08	Win	(New Zealand) Hiriwa Te Rangi	K-1 New Zealand Grand Prix 2003 in Auckland, Quarter Finals	Auckland, New Zealand	KO	3	2:50
2002-04-21	Draw	(Japan) Ryuta Noji	K-1 Burning 2002	Hiroshima, Japan	Decision Draw	5	3:00
2002-02-18	Loss	(Australia) Adam Watt	K-1 World Grand Prix 2002 Preliminary Melbourne, Finals	Melbourne, Australia	KO	1	1:50
Fight was for K-1 World Grand Prix 2002 Preliminary Melbourne title.
2002-02-18	Win	(New Zealand) Doug Viney	K-1 World Grand Prix 2002 Preliminary Melbourne, Semi Finals	Melbourne, Australia	KO	1	1:38
2002-02-18	Win	(New Zealand) Rony Sefo	K-1 World Grand Prix 2002 Preliminary Melbourne, Quarter Finals	Melbourne, Australia	Decision (3-0)	3	3:00
2001-12-13	Win	(New Zealand) Auckland Aumitagi	Payback	Auckland, New Zealand			
2001-02-24	Loss	(New Zealand) Mark Hunt	K-1 Oceania Grand Prix 2001 in Melbourne, Semi Finals	Melbourne, Australia	KO (Right Punch)	1	0:48
2001-02-24	Win	(Australia) Paul Robinson	K-1 Oceania Grand Prix 2001 in Melbourne, Quarter Finals	Melbourne, Australia	Decision (Unanimous)	3	3:00
2000-11-10	Win	(New Zealand) Rony Sefo	K-1 New Zealand Grand Prix 2000, Finals	Auckland, New Zealand	KO (Right high kick)	1	0:54
Wins K-1 New Zealand Grand Prix 2000 title.
2000-11-10	Win	(New Zealand) Auckland Aumitagi	K-1 New Zealand Grand Prix 2000, Semi Finals	Auckland, New Zealand	KO	2	
2000-11-10	Win	(Samoa) Foma'I Taho-Tusa	K-1 New Zealand Grand Prix 2000, Quarter Finals	Auckland, New Zealand	KO		
2000-08-16	Win	(New Zealand) Josh Khan	Power Station	Auckland, New Zealand			
Legend: Win Loss Draw/No contest Notes

== Notes ==
a.	Daniel Marhold (Slovenian) fought in Croatian team against New Zealand.

Image taken by Global Vehicle Exporter, Nicholas J Bull at F1 Suzuka 2005
