= Doug Viney =

New Zealand boxer and kickboxer

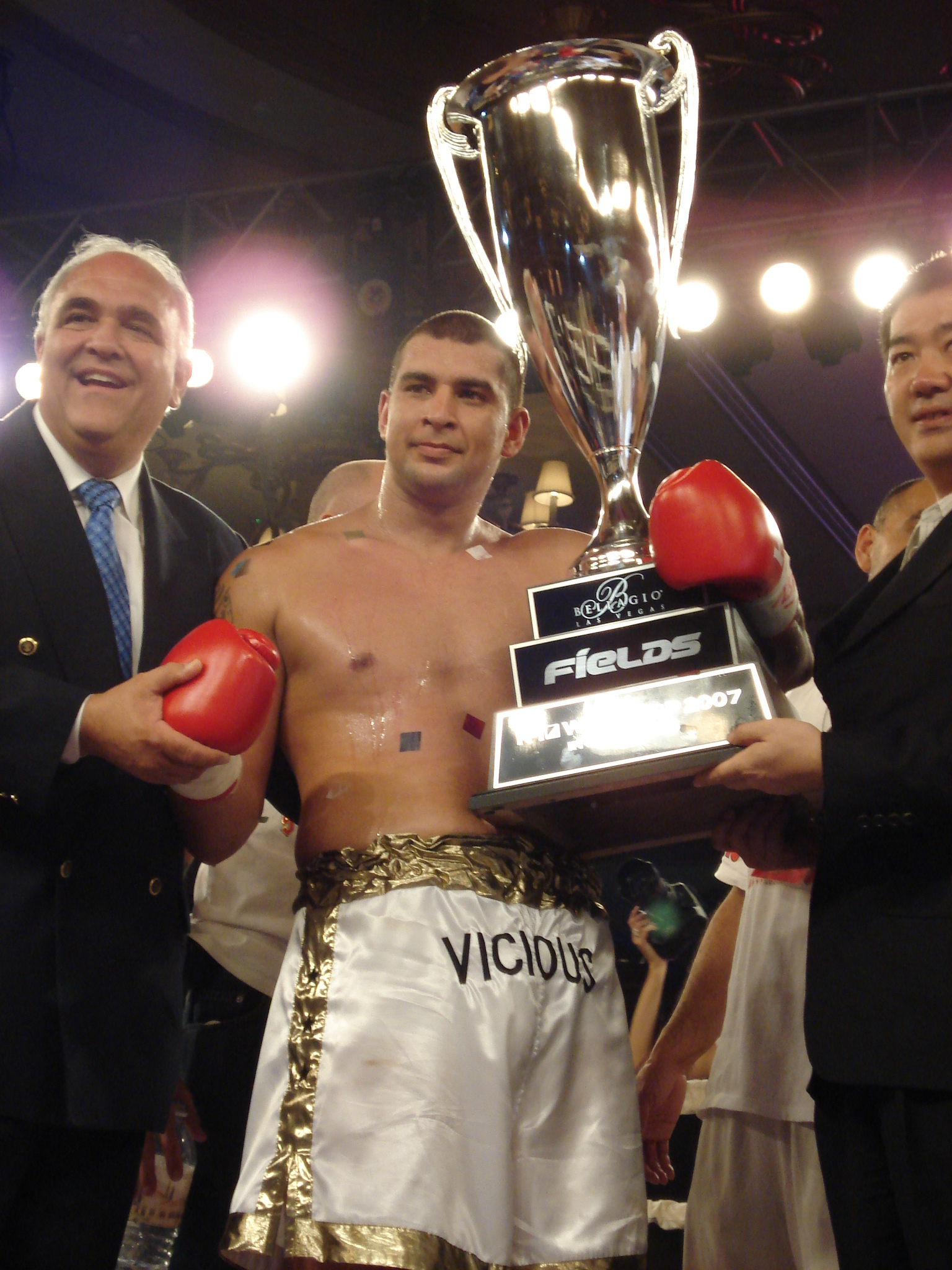
- Doug Viney in 2007
- Born: Douglas Ma'afu Hawke; 20 November 1976 (age 49); Auckland, New Zealand
- Other names: Vicious
- Nationality: Tongan; New Zealander
- Height: 1.87 m (6 ft 2 in)
- Weight: 100 kg (220 lb; 15 st 10 lb)
- Division: Super heavyweight
- Style: Boxing, Muay Thai
- Fighting out of: Auckland, New Zealand
- Team: Team Sefo; Balmoral Lee Gar Gym; City Kickboxing Gym
- Trainer: Ray Sefo; Lolo Heimuli; Jayson Vemoa
- Years active: 2000–present

Professional boxing record
- Total: 1
- Wins: 1
- By knockout: 0
- Losses: 0

Kickboxing record
- Total: 31
- Wins: 21
- By knockout: 9
- Losses: 10
- By knockout: 7

Mixed martial arts record
- Total: 1
- Wins: 0
- Losses: 1
- By submission: 1

Other information
- Occupation: Personal Trainer
- Boxing record from BoxRec
- Mixed martial arts record from Sherdog

Douglas Ma'afu Hawke, better known as Doug "Vicious" Viney (born 20 November 1976) is a Tongan-New Zealander heavyweight boxer and kickboxer. He is the K-1 World GP 2007 in Las Vegas champion, who also represented Tonga as a super heavyweight boxer under the name of Ma'afu Hawke at 2004 Summer Olympics in Athens, Greece.

== Biography and career ==
Viney made his K-1 debut on 21 July 2001 at the K-1 New Zealand Grand Prix 2001. He knocked out Dion Crouch and Auckland Aumitagi in the quarter and semi-finals, respectively, before going on to face Rony Sefo in the final, who he defeated via decision. He then went on to the K-1 World Grand Prix 2002 Preliminary Melbourne in February 2002, where he was defeated in the semi-finals by Andrew Peck after beating Chris Chrisopoulides in the quarters. In November 2002, he again entered the New Zealand Grand Prix at K-1 New Zealand 2002 where he reached the final only to be defeated by Jason Suttie.

He then went on to lose his next two fights after this also, and then switched to the sport of boxing. In the summer of 2004, he represented Tonga as a super heavyweight boxer under the name of Ma'afu Hawke at 2004 Summer Olympics in Athens, Greece. After the Olympics, he made his professional boxing debut on 3 September 2005 by defeating Junior Pati by decision.

He returned to kickboxing in 2006, winning his first three fights, including a decision win over Peter Graham. On 4 May 2007, he took part in the eight-man tournament at K-1 Fighting Network Romania 2007 and was defeated in the quarter-finals by Brecht Wallis. Three months later, on 11 August, he was reserve fighter at the K-1 World Grand Prix 2007 in Las Vegas. After defeating Mahmoud Fawzy in the reserve match, he was called in to the semi-finals to face Aleksandr Pitchkounov after Rick Cheek pulled out of the tournament with an injury. He was able to defeat Aleksandr Pitchkounov, and then went on to beat Zabit Samedov in the final.

After winning the Las Vegas Grand Prix, he was given a place in the last 16 of the 2007 K-1 World Grand Prix. He was knocked out in round 2 by Badr Hari at the K-1 World Grand Prix 2007 in Seoul Final 16. He then returned in 2008 at the K-1 World Grand Prix 2008 in Amsterdam where he rematched Zabit Samedov in the semi-finals. Samedov was able to take his revenge, winning by decision and knocking Viney out of the tournament.

== Kickboxing record ==
Kickboxing Record
19 Wins (9 (T)KO's, 10 decisions), 10 Losses, 0 Draw
Date	Result	Opponent	Event	Location	Method	Round	Time
2012-08-25	Loss	(Australia) Paul Slowinski	Capital Punishment 6	Canberra, Australia	Decision	3	3:00
2012-03-17	Win	(Australia) Eric Nosa	Kings of Kombat 6	Keysborough, Australia	Decision	3	3:00
2010-08-29	Loss	(Australia) Peter Graham	Kings of Kombat	Keysborough, Australia	TKO	5	
2009-04-12	Loss	(Romania) Sebastian Ciobanu	Local Kombat 33	Romania	Decision (Unanimous)	3	3:00
2008-09-12	Win	(Turkey) Erhan Deniz	K-1 Slovakia 2008	Bratislava, Slovakia	Decision	3	3:00
2008-04-26	Loss	(Azerbaijan) Zabit Samedov	K-1 World Grand Prix 2008 in Amsterdam Quarter Finals	Amsterdam, Netherlands	Decision (Unanimous)	3	3:00
Fails to K-1 World Grand Prix 2008 in Amsterdam.
2007-09-11	Loss	(Morocco) Badr Hari	K-1 World Grand Prix 2007 in Seoul Final 16	Seoul, Korea	KO (Straight right punch)	2	1:23
Fails to qualify for K-1 World Grand Prix 2007 Finals.
2007-08-11	Win	(Azerbaijan) Zabit Samedov	K-1 World Grand Prix 2007 in Las Vegas Final	Las Vegas, NV, United States	Decision (Unanimous)	3	3:00
Wins K-1 World Grand Prix 2007 in Las Vegas and qualifies for K-1 World Grand Prix 2007 Final Elimination.
2007-08-11	Win	(Russia) Aleksandr Pitchkounov	K-1 World Grand Prix 2007 in Las Vegas Semi Finals	Las Vegas, NV, United States	Decision (Unanimous)	3	3:00
2007-08-11	Win	(United States) Mahmoud Fawzy	K-1 World Grand Prix 2007 in Las Vegas Reserve Fight	Las Vegas, NV, United States	TKO (2 knockdowns/Right uppercut)	1	2:08
2007-05-04	Loss	(Belgium) Brecht Wallis	K-1 Fighting Network Romania 2007 Quarter Finals	Bucharest, Romania	KO (Left roundhouse kick)	3	0:50
Fails to K-1 Fighting Network Romania 2007.
2006-11-18	Win	(Australia) Peter Graham	K-1 Kings of Oceania 2006 Round 3	Auckland, New Zealand	Decision (Unanimous)	3	3:00
2006-09-24	Win	Matt Samoa	K-1 Kings of Oceania 2006 Round 2	Auckland, New Zealand	Decision	3	3:00
2006-06-24	Win	(New Zealand) Andrew Peck	K-1 Kings of Oceania 2006 Round 1	Auckland, New Zealand	Decision	3	3:00
2003-09-12	Loss	(Croatia) Gordan Jukic	K-1 Final Fight	Split, Croatia	KO (High Kick)	1	2:40
2003-04-11	Loss	(Croatia) Gordan Jukic	K-1 Lord of the Rings	Auckland, New Zealand	TKO	2	
2002-11-08	Loss	(New Zealand) Jason Suttie	K-1 New Zealand 2002 Final	Auckland, New Zealand	KO	3	1:32
Runner Up of K-1 New Zealand 2002.
2002-11-08	Win	(New Zealand) Andrew Peck	K-1 New Zealand 2002 Semi Finals	Auckland, New Zealand	Decision	3	3:00
2002-11-08	Win	(New Zealand) Oliva Tuisafia	K-1 New Zealand 2002 Quarter Finals	Auckland, New Zealand	KO	1	2:55
2002-02-18	Loss	(New Zealand) Andrew Peck	K-1 World Grand Prix 2002 Preliminary Melbourne Semi Finals	Melbourne, Australia	KO	1	1:38
Fails to K-1 World Grand Prix 2002 Preliminary Melbourne.
2002-02-18	Win	(Australia) Chris Chrisopoulides	K-1 World Grand Prix 2002 Preliminary Melbourne Quarter Finals	Melbourne, Australia	TKO	2	2:59
2001-07-21	Win	(New Zealand) Rony Sefo	K-1 New Zealand Grand Prix 2001 Final	Auckland, New Zealand	Decision (Unanimous)	3	3:00
Wins K-1 New Zealand Grand Prix 2001 championship.
2001-07-21	Win	(Samoa) Auckland Aumitagi	K-1 New Zealand Grand Prix 2001 Semi Finals	Auckland, New Zealand	TKO		
2001-07-21	Win	(New Zealand) Dion Crouch	K-1 New Zealand Grand Prix 2001 Quarter Finals	Auckland, New Zealand	KO	2	
Legend: Win Loss Draw/No contest Notes

== Mixed martial arts record ==
Professional record breakdown
21 matches	11 wins	10 losses
By knockout	7	5
By submission	4	4
By decision	0	1

Res.	Record	Opponent	Method	Event	Date	Round	Time	Location	Notes
Loss	0-1	(England) James McSweeney	Submission (rear naked choke)	Shamrock Events Kings of Kombat 5	10 December 2011	1	2:30	Keysborough, Victoria, Australia	

== Boxing record ==
1 Wins, 0 Losses, 0 Draws
Result	Record	Opponent	Type	Round, Time	Date	Location	Notes
Win	1-0	(New Zealand) Junior Pati	PTS	4 (4)	2005-09-03	Auckland, New Zealand	Pro debut.

== Titles ==
- 2007 K-1 World Grand Prix Las Vegas 8 man Champion
- 2006 Kings of Oceania Champion
- 2004 Athens Summer Olympian
- 2004 Oceania Amateur Heavyweight Boxing Champion
- 2001 K-1 New Zealand 8 man Champion

== See also ==
- List of male kickboxers
- List of K-1 Events
- List of K-1 champions
