= Ben Edwards (kickboxer) =

Australian boxer and mixed martial arts fighter

- Born: Benjamin Edwards; 17 February 1985 (age 41); Sydney, Australia
- Other names: The Guvner, Bangin'
- Nationality: Australian
- Height: 1.91 m (6 ft 3 in)
- Weight: 121.5 kg (268 lb; 19.13 st)
- Division: Heavyweight
- Reach: 76 in (190 cm)
- Style: Kickboxing
- Stance: Orthodox
- Fighting out of: Canberra, Australia
- Team: Bulldog Gym Canberra
- Trainer: John Verran (2003–2009); Jamie McCuaig (2009–present)
- Years active: 2004–present

Professional boxing record
- Total: 5
- Wins: 4
- By knockout: 4
- Losses: 0
- Draws: 1

Kickboxing record
- Total: 50
- Wins: 38
- By knockout: 33
- Losses: 10
- By knockout: 6
- Draws: 2

Mixed martial arts record
- Total: 6
- Wins: 5
- By knockout: 5
- Losses: 1
- By decision: 1

Other information
- University: Dickson College
- Boxing record from BoxRec
- Mixed martial arts record from Sherdog
- Last updated on: 3 May 2014

Ben "The Guvner" Edwards (born 17 February 1985) is an Australian heavyweight kickboxer, boxer and mixed martial artist. He is the K-1 World Grand Prix 2010 in Canberra tournament champion. He won the tournament by three 1st-round KOs, the fastest win in K-1 history, in a total time of 3 minutes and 28 seconds, breaking the previous record held by Jerome Le Banner of 4 minutes and 4 seconds in K-1 World Grand Prix 2001 in Osaka.

Fighting out of Bulldog Gym, Canberra, Australia, Edwards has competed in the K-1, Capital Punishment, Kings of Kombat, SUPERKOMBAT and It's Showtime promotions. He is currently signed to GLORY.

== Biography and career ==
Ben Edwards was born in Sydney and has been living in Canberra since he was 4, currently residing in Queanbeyan. He played Rugby league until he was 19. He represented the Canberra Raiders sides in both Harold Matthews Cup and SG Ball sides. He went to Dickson College where he played first grade for the Queanbeyan Blues.

Ben Edwards started kickboxing in 2003 at the Bulldog Gym under late John Verran his coach and mentor.

After winning multiple ISKA kickboxing titles, he made his K-1 debut at the K-1 World Grand Prix 2010 Canberra. He knocked out all three of his opponents in the first round, including tournament favourite, Paul Slowinski, whom he had lost to twice in his career. He still maintains the record for the fastest kickboxing tournament in K-1 history, at 3 minutes and 28 seconds.

At the K-1 Final 16, in the main event he lost to the eventual World Grand Prix champion Alistair Overeem in the first round.

Following the loss he decisioned Carter Williams and knocked out Mighty Mo in 2011. He finished the year with a loss against Roman Kleibl in the semi-finals of the SUPERKOMBAT Fight Club tournament. After being dropped by Daniel Sam in the quarter-finals he finished off his opponent in the second round. Despite dropping Kleibl in the second round he was TKOed in the final round after running out of energy.

He started out 2012 with a decision win against Ricardo van den Bos. He is now scheduled to face Rico Verhoeven on March, 17 in Australia.

He faced Raul Cătinaş at the K-1 World Grand Prix 2012 in Tokyo final 16 on 14 October 2012 and won via TKO in round two.

Edwards was drawn against Zabit Samedov in the quarter-finals of the K-1 World Grand Prix FINAL in Zagreb, held on 15 March 2013 in Zagreb, Croatia. However, he decided not to compete as he was already booked to fight Paul Slowinski for the fourth time on 23 March 2013 in Canberra, Australia at Capital Punishment 7. He defeated Slowinski by decision.

He joined Glory in July 2013.

He won the vacant Kings of Kombat Heavyweight Championship with a majority decision win over Cătălin Moroșanu at Kings of Kombat 10 in Melbourne, Australia on 7 September 2013, relying heavily on low kicks in the fight rather than use his usual brawling style.

In a slugfest at Glory 12: New York - Lightweight World Championship Tournament in New York City on 23 November 2013, Edwards landed numerous unanswered shots on Jamal Ben Saddik throughout round three before eventually putting him away with a big right hand towards the end.

He was initially set to face Errol Zimmerman in the main event of Glory 15: Istanbul in Istanbul, Turkey on 12 April 2014 but the match was transferred to the semi-finals of the Glory 16: Denver - Heavyweight Contendership Tournament in Broomfield, Colorado, US on 3 May 2014. He lost to Zimmerman via TKO, suffering two knockdowns in the first round.

== Titles ==
=== Kickboxing ===
- 2013 Kings of Kombat Heavyweight champion
- 2010 K-1 World Grand Prix in Canberra champion
- 2009 ISKA Super-heavyweight World champion (2 title def.)
- 2008 ISKA Super-heavyweight South Pacific title

=== Mixed martial arts ===
- 2013 C8 Heavyweight Champion

=== Boxing ===
- 2015 Australian Heavyweight Champion

== Kickboxing record ==
Kickboxing record
38 wins (33 (T)KOs), 11 losses, 2 draws
Date	Result	Opponent	Event	Location	Method	Round	Time
2015-10-09	Loss	(Netherlands) Jahfarr Wilnis	Glory 24: Denver – Heavyweight Contender Tournament, Semi-finals	Denver, Colorado, USA	TKO (2 knockdowns)	2	1:36
2014-05-03	Loss	(Curaçao) Errol Zimmerman	Glory 16: Denver – Heavyweight Contender Tournament, Semi-finals	Broomfield, Colorado, USA	TKO (right hook)	1	2:50
2013-11-23	Win	(Morocco) Jamal Ben Saddik	Glory 12: New York	New York City, USA	KO (right hook)	3	2:52
2013-09-07	Win	(Romania) Cătălin Moroșanu	Kings of Kombat 10	Melbourne	Decision (majority)	3	3:00
Wins Kings of Kombat Heavyweight title.
2013-03-23	Win	(Poland) Paul Slowinski	Capital Punishment 7	Canberra, Australia	Decision	3	3:00
2012-10-14	Win	(Romania) Raul Cătinaș	K-1 World Grand Prix 2012 in Tokyo final 16, First Round	Tokyo, Japan	TKO (referee stoppage)	2	2:24
2012-03-17	Loss	(Netherlands) Rico Verhoeven	Capital Punishment 5	Canberra, Australia	Decision	3	3:00
2012-01-28	Win	(Netherlands) Ricardo van den Bos	It's Showtime 2012 in Leeuwarden	Leeuwarden, Netherlands	Decision (unanimous)	3	3:00
2011-11-17	Loss	(Czech Republic) Roman Kleibl	SUPERKOMBAT Fight Club, Semi-finals	Oradea, Romania	KO (left hook)	3	2:38
2011-11-17	Win	(England) Daniel Sam	SUPERKOMBAT Fight Club, Quarter-finals	Oradea, Romania	TKO (referee stoppage)	2	2:43
2011-07-30	Win	(United States) Mighty Mo	Capital Punishment 4	Canberra, Australia	KO (knee)	2	2:18
2011-04-02	Win	(United States) Carter Williams	Kings of Kombat 3	Keysborough, Australia	Decision (majority)	3	3:00
2010-10-02	Loss	(Netherlands) Alistair Overeem	K-1 World Grand Prix 2010 in Seoul Final 16	Seoul, Korea	KO (right hook/3 knockdowns)	1	2:08
2010-07-10	Win	(Poland) Paul Slowinski	K-1 World Grand Prix 2010 in Canberra, final	Canberra, Australia	TKO (three knockdowns/punches)	1	1:24
Wins K-1 World Grand Prix 2010 tournament title.
2010-07-10	Win	(New Zealand) Tafa Misapati	K-1 World Grand Prix 2010 in Canberra, semi-final	Canberra, Australia	TKO (three knockdowns/left uppercut)	1	0:59
2010-07-10	Win	(Sudan) Faisal Zakaria	K-1 World Grand Prix 2010 in Canberra, quarter final	Canberra, Australia	KO (left hook)	1	1:03
2010-04-01	Win	(Australia) Mick Siebert	Marrara International Stadium	Darwin, Northern Territory	TKO (referee stoppage/shin injury)	1	0:30
2010-02-20	Win	(Australia) Thor Hoopman	Capital Punishment	Canberra, Australia	TKO (referee stoppage)	1	
Defended his ISKA Super Heavyweight (+95kg) World title.
2009-10-09	Loss	(Poland) Paul Slowinski	Evolution 18	Melbourne	TKO (low kicks)	3	
Fight was for International Kickboxer Super Heavyweight (+95kg) title.
2009-08-29	Win	(New Zealand) Andrew Peck	World Domination II, Rydges Lakeside Hotel	Canberra, Australia	TKO (referee stoppage)	1	2:24
Defended his ISKA Super Heavyweight (+95kg) World title.
2009-04-04	Win	(United States) Rick Cheek	World Domination	Canberra, Australia	KO (right cross)	1	1:39
Wins ISKA Super Heavyweight (+95kg) World title.
2008–11	Win	(Australia) Mick Siebert		Australia	KO (left hook)	2	1:03
Wins ISKA Super Heavyweight (+95kg) South Pacific title.
2008-04-20	Loss	(Japan) Nobu Hayashi	Titans	Tokyo, Japan	Decision (split)	3	3:00
2008-03-29	Win	(Russia) Ramazan Ramazanov	Xplosion 18 Super Fights	Sydney	KO (left hook)	2	
2007–12	Win	(Serbia) Duško Basrak		Serbia	KO	2	
2007-03-03	Loss	(New Zealand) Jason Suttie	Philip Lam Promotions	Auckland, New Zealand	Decision (split)	3	3:00
2006-11-11	Win	(Australia) Erik Nosa	N&J promotion presents "Men at War"	Canberra, Australia	KO	2	
Wins Super Heavyweight (+95kg) Australian title.
2006-08-04	Draw	(Australia) Erik Nosa	War on the North Shore III	Brookvale, New South Wales	Decision draw	3	3:00
2006-06-24	Loss	(New Zealand) Peter Sampson	K-1 Kings of Oceania 2006 Round 1	Auckland, New Zealand	Decision	3	3:00
2006-03-05	Loss	(New Zealand) Jay Hepi	K-1 World Grand Prix 2006 in Auckland	Auckland, New Zealand	Decision (majority)	3	3:00
2005-12-10	Loss	(Poland) Paul Slowinski	K-1 Kings of Oceania 2005 Round 3	Gold Coast, Australia	KO	2	
2005-10-08	Win	(New Zealand) Sidney Asiata	K-1 Kings of Oceania 2005 Round 2	Auckland, New Zealand	Ext. R decision	4	3:00
2005-06-17	Win	(Australia) Martin Opetaia	JNI promotion "50th Show"	Hurstville, New South Wales			
2005-04-29	Win	(Australia) Jason Boneham	JNI "Unfinished Business"	Hurstville, New South Wales			
2005-02-01	Win	(Australia) arren Berry	Jabout Show @ Penrith Panthers	Penrith, New South Wales			
2004-08-20	Win	(Lebanon) Wesam El Dahabi	JNI "Wicked Ways"	Hurstville, New South Wales			

Boxing record
3 wins (3 (T)KOs), 0 losses, 1 draw
Date	Result	Opponent	Event	Location	Method	Round	Time	Record
2014-11-15	Win	(New Zealand) Tafa Misipati	Hellenic Club of Canberra	Canberra, Australia	KO	1		4–0–1
2011-05-13	Draw	(Australia) Michael Kirby	The Melbourne Pavilion	Flemington, Victoria, Australia	Decision (split)	10	3:00	3–0–1
Fight was for vacant Australian heavyweight title.
2011-02-18	Win	(New Zealand) Leamy Tato	Rydges Lakeside Canberra Hotel	Canberra, Australian Capital Territory	KO	1		3–0
2009-07-23	Win	(Australia) Sam Leuii	AIS Arena	Bruce, Australian Capital Territory	TKO	1		2–0
2007-04-13	Win	(Australia) John Hopoate	Erindale Vikings Club	Wanniassa, Australian Capital Territory	TKO	1	1:29	1–0
Legend: Win Loss Draw/no contest Notes

== Mixed martial arts record ==
Professional record breakdown
6 matches	5 wins	1 loss
By knockout	5	0
By decision	0	1

Res.	Record	Opponent	Method	Event	Date	Round	Time	Location	Notes
Loss	5–1	Francimar Barroso	Decision (unanimous)	PFL 6	8 August 2019	3	5:00	Atlantic City, New Jersey, United States	
Win	5–0	Wallace To'o	TKO	MFC 29	16 Feb 2019	2		Canberra, Australia	
Win	4–0	Felise Leniu	TKO	Hex Fight Series 14	30 Jun 2018	1		Melbourne, Australia	
Win	3–0	Jeremy Joiner	KO	MFC 26	11 Dec 2017	1	1:35	Canberra, Australia	
Win	2–0	Brandon Sosoli	TKO (submission to strikes)	MFC 25	17 Jun 2017	1	3:53	Canberra, Australia	
Win	1–0	Donnie Lester	TKO	Combat8:03	29 Aug 2013	1		Sydney	MMA debut. Wins C8 Heavyweight Title.

== See also ==
- List of male kickboxers
- List of K-1 events

Awards and achievements
Preceded by David Levi	Australian heavyweight Championship	Succeeded by Peter Graham
