= Peter Graham (fighter) =

Australian boxer, kickboxer and mixed martial artist

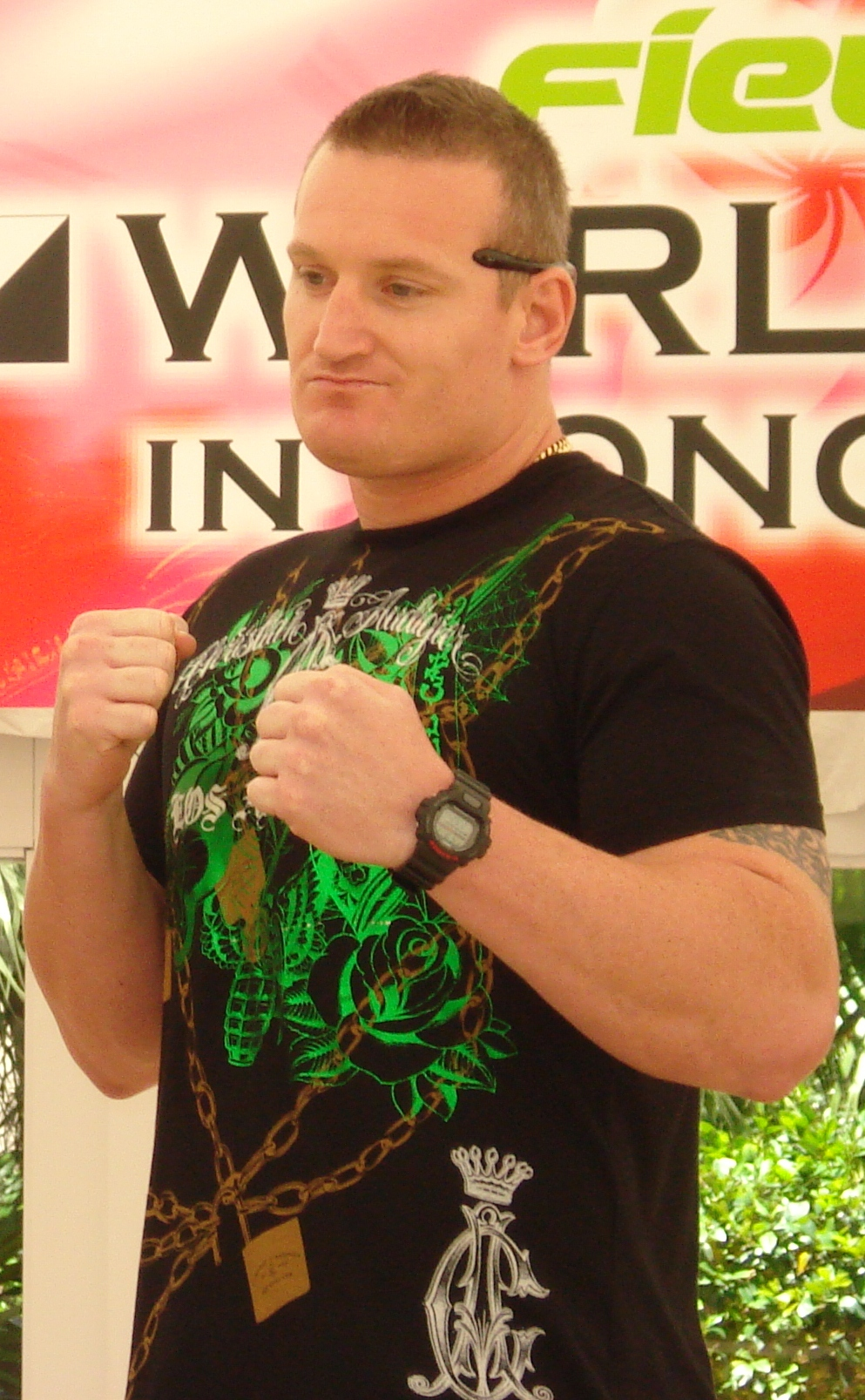
- Graham at K-1 World GP 2007 in Hong Kong press conference
- Born: 5 August 1975 (age 51); Sydney, Australia
- Other names: The Chief
- Height: 6 ft 2 in (188 cm)
- Weight: 247 lb (112 kg; 17 st 9 lb)
- Division: Heavyweight
- Reach: 73 in (185 cm)
- Style: Kyokushin, kickboxing
- Stance: Orthodox
- Fighting out of: Tokyo, Japan
- Team: Redfern Gym; Spirit Gym; Boxing Works; IMC
- Trainer: Larry Papadopoulos (BJJ MMA); Alex Tui; Nicholas Pettas (K1 Kickboxing Thai boxing); Paul Grech (Boxing); Graham Porter; Paul Zadro (Kempo karate)
- Rank: First degree black belt in Kyokushin Karate; Second degree black belt in Kempo Karate; Blue belt in Brazilian jiu-jitsu Orange belt in Judo
- Years active: 2000–2002, 2012–2017 (Boxing); 2000–2014 (Kickboxing); 2008–2016 (MMA)

Professional boxing record
- Total: 16
- Wins: 11
- By knockout: 5
- Losses: 4
- By knockout: 2
- Draws: 1

Kickboxing record
- Total: 74
- Wins: 59
- By knockout: 32
- Losses: 14
- Draws: 1

Mixed martial arts record
- Total: 21
- Wins: 11
- By knockout: 10
- By decision: 1
- Losses: 10
- By submission: 8
- By decision: 2

Other information
- Spouse: Silvia dos Santos
- Boxing record from BoxRec
- Mixed martial arts record from Sherdog
- Last updated on: 29 May 2014

Peter Graham (born 5 August 1975) is an Australian former karateka, kickboxer, boxer and mixed martial artist.

== Background ==
Originally from North Sydney, New South Wales, Australia, Graham began training in Kyokushin Karate at the age of 18. He quickly demonstrated his talents, winning his first tournament in an under yellow belt division about half a year later. In 1999 at the age of 23, Graham won the Amateur Australian and New Zealand Open Weight Championships and soon also became the South Pacific Champion. He then moved to Ikebukuro in Tokyo, Japan to further hone his skills and live in a dojo. However, he only completed three months of this rigorous training before having to return to Australia after his brother Matthew died of a heroin overdose. Graham earned his black belt in only five years.

== Kickboxing career ==
Graham began kickboxing and boxing at the age of 21 and before turning professional he captured the World Kickboxing Federation World Amateur Heavyweight Championship from New Zealand's Shane Wijohn, finishing his amateur career undefeated (17–0). Graham turned professional in 2000 and attained instant success, defeating Ben Hamilton in K-1 Oceania Revenge by TKO and then Clay Aumitagi.

On 19 November 2000 he became the first Australian to go ten rounds with the legendary Stan "The Man" Longinidis.

In 2001 he defeated Mark Hunt, the K-1 World GP Champion of the year. He won his second WKBF Super Heavyweight title the next year, and won the Kings of Oceania 2004 championship after defeating his long-term rival Jason Suttie.

In 2006, Graham had a feud with Badr Hari in K-1 World Grand Prix 2006 in Auckland. Hari mocked Graham as a has-been, and Hari as the future. A brawl at the press conference instigated by Hari kissing Graham hyped up their match. The real match was won by Peter, who won by knockout via his trademark "Rolling Thunder" spinning kick, which broke Hari's jaw. Hari was sidelined for almost a year.

On 31 December 2006 at K-1 PREMIUM 2006 Dynamite!!, Graham fought the four time K-1 heavyweight champion, Dutch man from the Seidokaikan dojo Semmy Schilt in a 5-round match and lost by unanimous decision (3–0).

On 5 August 2007, Graham and Hari met for a revenge fight in K-1 World GP 2007 in Hong Kong as one of the three super bouts of the event, held in Hong Kong for the first time. This time, Hari was more alert to the threat of a Rolling Thunder by Graham. Both fighters could not show their top performances as Hari won the fight by points. Graham tried the Rolling Thunder Kick twice in the last moments of the fight, but could not connect with Hari.

In a rematch with Doug Viney at Kings of Kombat in Keysborough, Victoria on 29 August 2010, Graham won via TKO in the fifth round to claim the ISKA World Heavyweight Championship. Graham lost the title to Paul Slowinski, in the third fight between them, when he lost by a third-round KO at King of Kombat 4 on 20 August 2011.

He has returned to kickboxing to fight Prince Ali at HEAT 24 in Nagoya, Japan on 7 October 2012, winning the fight via decision.

He is competed in a Heavyweight Tournament at GFC Series 1 in Dubai on 29 May 2014, defeating Arnold Oborotov via an extension round majority decision in the semi-finals before losing to Badr Hari by first-round TKO in the final.

== Mixed martial arts career ==
After training with PRIDE veteran Akira Shoji, Peter made his MMA debut in World Victory Road on 5 March 2008 against the seasoned Japanese MMA fighter Kazuyuki Fujita, and was defeated by submission in the first round. Graham undeterred by the loss returned to for the World Victory Road Presents: Sengoku 4, where he again he fought valiantly in a much closer match against French grappler Moise Rimbon but Graham was submitted early in the second round.

Over the course of the following two years Graham proceed to hone his BJJ skills in Brazil, earning a blue belt, and continued to fight at elite level matches around the globe matched against the likes of Rolles Gracie Jr. In July 2010 Graham defeated American K-1 Champion Carter Williams.

On 8 December 2010, Graham defeated Alexander Emelianenko by TKO via leg kicks halfway through the second round. This marks Graham's biggest win in MMA to date.

In 2012, Graham defeated Konstantin Gluhov twice by KO & TKO.

Following the second Gluhov fight, he returned home to fight at Australian Fighting Championship (AFC) 4, defeating Donnie Lester by TKO 1:50 of Round 1, in December 2012.

Graham was scheduled to fight upcoming MMM star Tai Tuivasa in Combat8 at C8:03, a Mixed Rules Australian MMA organization. Graham defeated Tai Tuivasa by TKO in the second round in a back and forth fight, making that his eighth KO/TKO MMA win so far.

Graham Beat Salimgirey Rasulov by TKO due to injury of Rasulov's broken arm in Russia on 2 June.

=== Bellator MMA ===
He signed with Bellator MMA in July 2013. He debuted at Bellator 104 on 18 October 2013 when he faced Eric Prindle. He won the fight by unanimous decision which marks the first MMA fight Graham had that went the distance.

In late October, Graham was announced as the injury replacement in the Bellator Season Nine Heavyweight Tournament. He faced Cheick Kongo on 8 November 2013 at Bellator 107. He lost the fight via unanimous decision.

On 7 March 2014, Graham faced Mighty Mo in the Bellator Season Ten Heavyweight Tournament at Bellator 111. Despite winning the first 2 rounds, Graham would lose via submission in the third round.

=== Konfrontacja Sztuk Walki ===
After going 1–2 in Bellator MMA, Graham returned to MMA competition in Poland at KSW 28 versus Marcin Rózalski on 4 October 2014. He won via TKO due to a leg injury in the second round. Graham next faced Karol Bedorf at KSW 31 on May 23, 2015. He lost the fight via unanimous decision. Graham faced Mariusz Pudzianowski at KSW 32: Road to Wembley on Halloween night 2015. Held at the Wembley Arena in London, the event was the first produced by KSW to take place outside of Poland. Graham won the fight via TKO in the second round.

=== Fight Nights Global ===
On June 17, 2016, Graham faced Vitaly Minakov at Fight Nights Global 50: Fedor vs. Maldonado. He lost the bout via armbar submission at just over a minute into the first round.

== Championships and achievements ==
=== Boxing ===
- Australian National Boxing Federation
  - Australian Heavyweight Championship (one time)
  - New South Wales State Heavyweight Championship (one time)
- World Boxing Foundation
  - World Boxing Foundation World Heavyweight Championship (one time) 2016
- World Boxing Organization
  - WBO Asia Pacific Heavyweight Championship (one time)

=== Karate ===
- South Pacific Karate Champion
- 1999 Australian Kyokushin Openweight Champion
- 1999 New Zealand Kyokushin Openweight Champion

=== Kickboxing ===
- International Sport Karate Association
  - ISKA World Heavyweight Championship (one time)
- K-1
  - 2001 K-1 World Grand Prix Preliminary Melbourne runner-up
  - 2003 K-1 World Grand Prix in Melbourne Champion
  - 2004 Kings of Oceania Champion
- World Kick Boxing Federation
  - WKBF Amateur Super Heavyweight Championship (one time)
  - WKBF World Super Heavyweight Championship (one time)

=== Mixed martial arts ===
- Bellator MMA
  - Bellator MMA Season 9 Heavyweight Tournament runner-up

== Personal life ==
Graham grew up in Sydney, NSW Australia. He was a street kid and lived in youth refuges until he was 20. Starting karate at 18, in just two years and with the help from his karate dojo and his own savings, Graham moved to Tokyo that same year, to study Kyokushin as an elite karate prospect. After the heroin overdose of his older brother he returned to Australia to bury him and start his journey back to Japan and to K1 kickboxing greatest heights. Five years later he won the amateur kickboxing world titles undefeated. Turning pro, he returned to Japan to fight K1.

Heeventually to married a Brazilian woman living in Tokyo on 22 June 2008. He got a tattoo on his right arm reading her name, "Silvia". They have two daughters together.

In 2010, Graham appeared on the TV program Find My Family, where he was reunited with his younger brother with whom he had lost contact and had not seen in 20 years.

In 2012, Graham opened his own full-time martial arts and combat sports school Prospect IMC at Prospect New South Wales.

== Mixed martial arts record ==
Professional record breakdown
21 matches	11 wins	10 losses
By knockout	10	0
By submission	0	8
By decision	1	2

Res.	Record	Opponent	Method	Event	Date	Round	Time	Location	Notes
Loss	11–10	Vitaly Minakov	Submission (armbar)	Fight Nights Global 50: Fedor vs. Maldonado	June 17, 2016	1	1:01	St. Petersburg, Russia	
Win	11–9	Mariusz Pudzianowski	TKO (punches and elbows)	KSW 32: Road to Wembley	31 October 2015	2	2:00	London, England	
Loss	10–9	Karol Bedorf	Decision (unanimous)	KSW 31: Materla vs. Drwal	23 May 2015	3	5:00	Gdańsk, Poland	
Loss	10–8	Denis Goltsov	Submission (kimura)	Tech-Krep FC – Ermak Prime Challenge	3 April 2015	2	3:23	Krasnodar, Russia	
Win	10–7	Marcin Różalski	TKO (knee injury)	KSW 28: Fighters Den	4 October 2014	2	0:43	Szczecin, Poland	
Loss	9–7	Mighty Mo	Submission (arm-triangle choke)	Bellator 111	7 March 2014	3	2:31	Thackerville, Oklahoma, United States	Bellator Season 10 Heavyweight Tournament Quarterfinal
Loss	9–6	Cheick Kongo	Decision (unanimous)	Bellator 107	8 November 2013	3	5:00	Thackerville, Oklahoma, United States	Bellator Season 9 Heavyweight Tournament Final
Win	9–5	Eric Prindle	Decision (unanimous)	Bellator 104	18 October 2013	3	5:00	Cedar Rapids, Iowa, United States	
Win	8–5	Salimgirey Rasulov	TKO (injury)	K-1 Global MMA	2 June 2013	2	1:00	Krasnodar Krai, Russia	
Win	7–5	Donnie Lester	TKO (corner stoppage)	AFC 4	7 December 2012	1	1:50	Melbourne, Australia	
Win	6–5	Konstantin Gluhov	TKO (punches)	Draka 11	24 November 2012	1	3:20	Khabarovsk, Russia	
Win	5–5	Konstantin Gluhov	KO (punch)	Governor's Cup 2012	11 February 2012	1	2:47	Khabarovsk, Russia	
Win	4–5	Alexander Emelianenko	TKO (leg kicks)	Draka 5	18 December 2010	2	2:59	Khabarovsk, Russia	Special rules allowing :30 on the ground.
Win	3–5	Yusuke Kawaguchi	TKO (elbows)	Xtreme MMA 3	5 November 2010	1	N/A	Sydney	
Win	2–5	Carter Williams	TKO (strikes)	Xtreme MMA 2	31 July 2010	1	4:10	Sydney	
Loss	1–5	Jim York	Submission (rear naked choke)	Impact FC 2	18 July 2010	1	3:44	Sydney	
Loss	1–4	Dion Staring	Submission (armbar)	Fury 1: Clash of the Titans	21 May 2010	1	N/A	Macau, China	
Win	1–3	Felise Leniu	TKO (punches)	RPA: Return of the Chief	18 April 2010	1	N/A	Keysborough, Australia	
Loss	0–3	Rolles Gracie	Submission (arm-triangle choke)	Art of War 14	26 September 2009	1	1:43	Macau, China	
Loss	0–2	Moise Rimbon	Submission (rear naked choke)	World Victory Road Presents: Sengoku 4	24 August 2008	2	0:42	Saitama, Saitama, Japan	
Loss	0–1	Kazuyuki Fujita	Submission (north-south choke)	World Victory Road Presents: Sengoku First Battle	5 March 2008	1	1:23	Tokyo, Japan	

== MMA mixed rules record ==
Professional record breakdown
1 match	1 win	0 losses
By knockout	1	0

Res.	Record	Opponent	Method	Event	Date	Round	Time	Location	Notes
Win	1–0	Tai Tuivasa	TKO (punches)	Combat8:03	27 April 2013	2	2:55	Big Top Sydney, New South Wales, Australia	

== Kickboxing record ==
59 wins (31 (T)KOs, 25 decisions), 14 losses
Date	Result	Opponent	Event	Method	Round	Time
13 April 2018	Loss	(Poland) Marcin Różalski	DSF Kickboxing Challenge 14	TKO		
29 May 2014	Loss	(Morocco) Badr Hari	GFC Fight Series 1 – Heavyweight Tournament, Final, Dubai, UAE	TKO (punches)	1	1:33
29 May 2014	Win	(Lithuania) Arnold Oborotov	GFC Fight Series 1 – Heavyweight Tournament, Semi-finals, Dubai, UAE	Extension round decision (majority)	4	3:00
23 March 2013	Win	(New Zealand) Erik Nosa	Capital Punishment 7, Canberra, Australia	KO (right low kick)	1	1:43
7 October 2012	Win	(Iran) Prince Ali	HEAT 24, Nagoya, Japan	Decision	3	3:00
20 August 2011	Loss	(Poland) Paul Slowinski	Kings of Kombat 4, Keysborough, Australia, I.S.K.A. Heavyweight World Title	KO	3	
2 April 2011	Win	(Australia) Andre Meunier	Kings of Combat 3, Keysborough, Australia	TKO (low kicks and punches)	3	
29 August 2010	Win	(New Zealand) Doug Viney	Kings of Combat, Keysborough, Australia, I.S.K.A. Heavyweight World Title	TKO (leg kicks)	5	
5 August 2007	Loss	(Morocco) Badr Hari	K-1 World Grand Prix 2007 in Hong Kong	Decision (unanimous)	3	3:00
28 April 2007	Win	(Netherlands) Jerrel Venetiaan	K-1 World Grand Prix 2007 in Hawaii, USA	Decision (unanimous)	3	3:00
31 December 2006	Loss	(Netherlands) Semmy Schilt	K-1 Premium 2006 Dynamite!!, Japan	Decision (unanimous)	5	3:00
18 November 2006	Loss	(New Zealand) Doug Viney	K-1 Kings of Oceania 2006 Round 3, New Zealand	Decision	3	3:00
11 November 2006	Win	(Japan) Yuki Kamikaze	Macau X-plosion, Macau	TKO (low kicks)	2	
16 September 2006	Win	(New Zealand) Andrew Peck	K-1 Kings of Oceania 2006 Round 2, New Zealand	TKO (low kicks)	2	
18 August 2006	Win	(Belarus) Andrei Malchanau	X-plosion 13, Sydney, Australia	TKO (referee stoppage)	1	
24 June 2006	Win	Matt Samoa	K-1 Kings of Oceania 2006 Round 1, New Zealand	KO (right hook)	1	2:16
5 March 2006	Loss	(Poland) Paul Slowinski	K-1 World Grand Prix 2006 in Auckland, New Zealand	TKO (low kicks)	2	1:42
5 March 2006	Win	(Morocco) Badr Hari	K-1 World Grand Prix 2006 in Auckland, New Zealand	KO (rolling thunder)	3	2:54
10 December 2005	Win	(Netherlands) Ricardo van den Bos	K-1 Kings of Oceania 2005 Round 3, Australia	KO (punches)	1	1:19
8 October 2005	Win	(New Zealand) Jay Hepi	K-1 Kings of Oceania 2005 Round 2, New Zealand	Decision	3	3:00
30 July 2005	Win	(New Zealand) Rony Sefo	K-1 Kings of Oceania 2005 Round 1, New Zealand	Decision (unanimous)	3	3:00
30 April 2005	Win	(Belarus) Alexey Ignashov	K-1 Battle of Anzacs II, New Zealand	2nd ext. R decision	5	3:00
5 November 2004	Loss	(New Zealand) Jason Suttie	K-1 Oceania MAX 2004, New Zealand	Decision (unanimous)	3	3:00
16 July 2004	Win	(New Zealand) Jason Suttie	Kings of Oceania 2004, New Zealand	Decision (unanimous)	3	3:00
16 July 2004	Win	(Poland) Paul Slowinski	Kings of Oceania 2004, New Zealand	Decision (unanimous)	3	3:00
16 July 2004	Win	(New Zealand) Hiriwa Te-Rangi	Kings of Oceania 2004, New Zealand	KO (rolling thunder)	1	1:59
6 March 2004	Loss	(Albania) Xhavit Bajrami	Kings of the Ring, Pristina, Kosovo, Serbia	Decision	5	3:00
6 December 2003	Loss	(Netherlands) Remy Bonjasky	K-1 World Grand Prix 2003, Japan	TKO (referee stoppage)	1	2:58
11 October 2003	Win	(Australia) Sam Greco	K-1 World Grand Prix 2003 Final Elimination, Japan	TKO (leg injury)	2	0:30
27 July 2003	Win	(New Zealand) Jason Suttie	K-1 World Grand Prix 2003 in Melbourne, Australia	Decision (unanimous)	3	3:00
27 July 2003	Win	(Papua New Guinea) Mitch O'Hello	K-1 World Grand Prix 2003 in Melbourne, Australia	Ext.R TKO (punch)	4	0:47
27 July 2003	Win	(Croatia) Josip Bodrozic	K-1 World Grand Prix 2003 in Melbourne, Australia	Decision	3	3:00
27 April 2003	Win	(Australia) Chris Chrispoulides	License to Thrill, Australia	Decision	3	3:00
24 April 2003	Win	(New Zealand) Mike Angove	Fights in Dunedin, New Zealand	TKO (knees)	2	0:55
31 August 2002	Win	(New Zealand) Hiriwa Te-Rangi	WKBF World Super Heavyweight Title, Dunedin, NZ	Decision	5	3:00
12 July 2002	Loss	(New Zealand) Jason Suttie	KB4 Fightnight, Sydney, Australia	Decision	3	3:00
12 July 2002	Win	(Australia) Chris Chrispoulides	KB4 Fightnight, Sydney, Australia	Decision	3	3:00
1 September 2001	Draw	(New Zealand) Jason Suttie	JNI Promotions, Star City, Australia	Draw	3	3:00
21 July 2001	Win	(New Zealand) Mark Hunt	K-1 New Zealand Grand Prix 2001	Decision	5	3:00
29 April 2001	Loss	(Australia) Adam Watt	K-1 World Grand Prix 2001 in Osaka, Japan	KO (left punch)	2	1:29
29 April 2001	Win	(South Africa) Jan Nortje	K-1 World Grand Prix 2001 in Osaka, Japan	Ext. R decision	4	3:00
7 April 2001	Win	(Australia) Fadi Hadara	Australia vs USA, Sydney, Australia	Decision	3	3:00
24 February 2001	Loss	(New Zealand) Mark Hunt	K-1 World Grand Prix 2001 Preliminary Melbourne, Australia	KO (right uppercut)	3	2:10
24 February 2001	Win	(New Zealand) Rony Sefo	K-1 World Grand Prix 2001 Preliminary Melbourne, Australia	Decision	3	3:00
24 February 2001	Win	(Australia) Phil Fagan	K-1 World Grand Prix 2001 Preliminary Melbourne, Australia	TKO (2 knockdowns)	2	
19 November 2000	Loss	(Australia) Stan Longinidis	K-1 Oceania Star Wars 2000, Australia	Decision (unanimous)	10	2:00
10 September 2000	Win	(Turkey) Gurkan Ozkan	K-1 Oceania Dream, Australia	Ext.R TKO (3 knockdowns)	4	
24 June 2000	Win	(Samoa) Clay Aumitagi	Bradford's Show, Sydney, Australia	Decision	3	3:00
14 May 2000	Win	(Australia) Ben Hamilton	K-1 Revenge Oceania, Australia	TKO (doctor stoppage)	2	
8 April 2000	Win	(Australia) Shane Wijohn	Bound for Glory, NSW, Australia	TKO (leg kicks and punches)	1	

== Professional boxing record ==
16 fights	11 wins	4 losses
By knockout	5	2
By decision	6	2
Draws	1	

No.	Result	Record	Opponent	Type	Round, time	Date	Location	Notes
16	Loss	11–4–1	Zhilei Zhang	KO	1 (10), 2:58	21 Jan 2017	Hebei Sports Venue, Shijiazhuang, China	For vacant WBO Oriental heavyweight title
15	Win	11–3–1	Julius Long	TD	6 (12), 2:02	27 Feb 2016	Darwin Convention Centre, Darwin, Australia	Won vacant WBF (Foundation) heavyweight title
14	Win	10–3–1	Alphonce Mchumiatumbo	TKO	4 (12), 1:01	28 Nov 2015	Suzhou Sports Center, Suzhou, China	Won vacant WBO Asia Pacific heavyweight title
13	Win	9–3–1	Ben Edwards	SD	10	11 Jul 2015	Hellenic Club, Woden Valley, Australia	Won Australian heavyweight title
12	Win	8–3–1	David Levi	TKO	6 (8), 2:17	22 Feb 2013	Entertainment Centre, Hurstville, Australia	Retained New South Wales heavyweight title
11	Win	7–3–1	George Poulivaati	UD	8	19 May 2012	Croatian Club, Punchbowl, Australia	Won New South Wales heavyweight title
10	Win	6–3–1	Patrick Kennedy	TKO	5 (6)	15 Nov 2002	Club Nova, Newcastle, Australia	
9	Win	5–3–1	Patrick Kennedy	UD	6	9 Aug 2002	Club Nova, Newcastle, Australia	
8	Win	4–3–1	Joseph Semeatu	KO	1 (4)	10 May 2002	Mayfield Ex Services Club, Newcastle, Australia	
7	Draw	3–3–1	Phil Gregory	PTS	8	1 Apr 2002	Sports Complex, Gold Coast, Australia	
6	Win	3–3	Paul Withers	KO	6 (6)	4 Mar 2002	Entertainment Centre, Townsville, Australia	
5	Win	2–3	Andrew Fepuileai	UD	4	15 Feb 2002	Woonona Bulli RSL Club, Wollongong, Australia	
4	Win	1–3	Glen Sewell	TD	2 (4)	12 Oct 2001	Sydney, Australia	
3	Loss	0–3	Simon Paterson	MD	6	28 Sep 2001	The Octagon, Sydney, Australia	
2	Loss	0–2	Caine Melbourne	KO	2 (?)	21 Jul 2000	Hornsby RSL Club, Sydney, Australia	
1	Loss	0–1	Caine Melbourne	PTS	4	23 Apr 2000	Wyong RSL Club, Wyong, Australia	

== See also ==
- List of mixed martial artists with professional boxing records

Awards and achievements
Preceded by Ben Edwards	Australian heavyweight Championship	Succeeded by Willie Nasio
