= Jason Suttie =

New Zealand martial artist

- Born: 7 August 1973 (age 53); Apia, Western Samoa
- Other names: Psycho
- Nationality: Samoan; New Zealander
- Height: 5 ft 11.5 in (1.82 m)
- Weight: 220 lb (100 kg; 16 st)
- Division: Super Middleweight; Light Heavyweight; Cruiserweight; Heavyweight
- Style: MMA; Kickboxing, Boxing, Muay thai, American Kenpo
- Fighting out of: Auckland, New Zealand
- Team: ETK (2000–present); Ihara Dojo (1993–99); Balmoral Lee Gar (1992–2000)
- Trainer: Roger Earp; Lolo Heimuli
- Years active: 1993–2008

Professional boxing record
- Total: 3
- Wins: 3
- Losses: 0
- Draws: 0

Kickboxing record
- Total: 89
- Wins: 71
- By knockout: 27
- Losses: 16
- By knockout: 3
- Draws: 2

Mixed martial arts record
- Total: 1
- Wins: 0
- Losses: 1
- By submission: 1
- Draws: 0

Other information
- Website: http://www.jasonsuttie.com
- Boxing record from BoxRec
- Mixed martial arts record from Sherdog

Jason "Psycho" Suttie (born 7 August 1973) is a Samoan-born New Zealand former heavyweight kickboxer and 6 time Muay Thai World champion fighting out of Elite Thai Kickboxing Gym in Auckland, New Zealand.

== Biography and career ==
In his youth Suttie fought under NZ trainer Lollo Heimuli of the gym Balmoral Lee Gar, training alongside Ray Sefo, Jayson Vemoa and Doug Viney. Having some 25 fights before opening his own gym, Jason has been very successful both as an amateur and professional kickboxer. As an amateur he took a New Zealand title and the South Pacific super middleweight and light heavyweight titles.

In 1996 Jason graduated from Auckland with a B.A. in education and in the same year was the first Kiwi to fight in the K-1 kickboxing promotion, at his fight Ray Sefo was in the audience negotiating his K-1 contract.

In 1997 Jason won his first world title and by 2000 he had racked up five more world titles in five different weight divisions from super middleweight (76 kg) through to super heavyweight (95 kg) with four different federations.

In 2010 he was acquitted of aggravated robbery and blackmail charges.

Jason owns and runs his gym Elite Thai Kickboxing with his partner Roger Earp in Auckland, New Zealand. He now promotes King in the Ring aiming for finding fighters NZ's.

== Titles ==
- 2006 K-1 World Grand Prix in Auckland Runner Up
- 2004 Kings of Oceania Runner Up
- 2003 K-1 World Grand Prix in Melbourne Runner Up
- 2002 K-1 NZ Champion
- 2002 KB4 Champion
- 2001 WMTA World Super Heavyweight Champion
- 2001 WKBF World Heavyweight Champion
- 2000 WKBF World Cruiserweight Champion
- 1999 WKBF World Light Heavyweight Champion
- 1998 ISKA World Super Middleweight Champion
- 1996 UTC World Super Middleweight Champion

== Kickboxing record ==
71 Wins (27 (T)KO's, 44 decisions), 16 Losses
Date	Result	Opponent	Event	Method	Round	Time
2008-11-25	Loss	(Bosnia and Herzegovina) Dzenan Poturak	Planet Battle, Hong Kong	Decision (Unanimous)	3	3:00
2008-10-17	Win	(Australia) Alofa Solitua	ETK "Nemesis", Auckland, New Zealand	Decision	3	3:00
2008-07-07	Loss	(Japan) Goutoku Onda	Heat 7, Nagoya, Japan	Decision (Majority)	3	3:00
2008-05-04	Win	(New Zealand) Charlie Smiler	Fight Club 8, Ellerslie, Auckland, New Zealand	Decision	3	3:00
2008-02-23	Loss	(New Zealand) Peter Sampson	Philip Lam Super Saturday, Auckland, New Zealand	Decision	3	3:00
2008-02-09	Win	(New Zealand) Leamy Tato	KO World Series 2008 Auckland, New Zealand	Decision	3	3:00
2007-12-21	Win	(New Zealand) Charlie Smiler	ETK Dominate Fight Royale 3, Auckland, New Zealand	Decision	3	3:00
2007-03-03	Win	(Australia) Ben Edwards	Philip Lam Promotions, Auckland, New Zealand	Decision (Split)	3	3:00
2006-11-18	Loss	(New Zealand) Peter Sampson	K-1 Kings of Oceania 2006 Round 3, Auckland, New Zealand	Decision (Majority)	3	3:00
2006-09-16	Win	(New Zealand) Simi Tai	K-1 Kings of Oceania 2006 Round 2, Auckland, New Zealand	TKO (Low kicks)		
2006-06-24	Win	(Netherlands) Reuben de Jong	K-1 Kings of Oceania 2006 Round 1, Auckland, New Zealand	Decision	3	3:00
2006-03-05	Loss	(Poland) Paul Slowinski	K-1 World Grand Prix 2006 in Auckland, Auckland, New Zealand	KO (Left high kick)	2	1:45
2006-03-05	Win	(Japan) Hiraku Hori	K-1 World Grand Prix 2006 in Auckland, Auckland, New Zealand	KO	3	1:34
2006-03-05	Win	(Tonga) Paula Mataele	K-1 World Grand Prix 2006 in Auckland, Auckland, New Zealand	Decision (Majority)	3	3:00
2005-12-10	Win	(New Zealand) Hiriwa Te Rangi	K-1 Kings of Oceania 2005 Round 3, Gold Coast, Australia	Decision	3	3:00
2005-11-04	Win	(Poland) Paul Slowinski	Knees of Fury 11, Gold Coast, Australia	KO (Left hook)	3	
2005-10-08	Win	(Tonga) Paula Mataele	K-1 Kings of Oceania 2005 Round 2, Auckland, New Zealand	Decision	3	3:00
2005-09-03	Win	(New Zealand) Richard Tutaki	Afternoon Rumble, New Zealand	Decision	3	3:00
2005-07-10	Win	Matt Samoa	K-1 Kings of Oceania 2005 Round 1, Auckland, New Zealand	KO (Punches)	1	
2005-04-30	Loss	(Australia) Chris Chrispoulides	K-1 Battle of Anzacs II, New Zealand	2nd Ext.R Decision	5	3:00
2005-03-12	Win	(Serbia) Dragan Jovanović	Tarik Solak's Show, Sydney, Australia	Decision	3	3:00
2005-02-18	Win	(Norway) Niels Eikeland	First of the Year, Auckland, New Zealand	KO (Straight right punch)	1	
2004-12-18	Win	(Netherlands) Ricardo van den Bos	K-1 Challenge 2004 Oceania vs World, Gold Coast, Australia	Decision	3	3:00
2004-11-05	Win	(Australia) Peter Graham	K-1 Oceania MAX 2004, New Zealand	Decision	5	3:00
2004-09-29	Win	(New Zealand) Edwin Marsh	NZ vs France, Auckland, New Zealand	KO	1	
2004-08-28	Win	(New Zealand) Hiriwa Te Rangi	Capital Punishment, Dunedin, New Zealand	Decision	5	3:00
2004-07-16	Loss	(Australia) Peter Graham	Kings of Oceania 2004, New Zealand	Decision (Unanimous)	3	3:00
2004-07-16	Win	Matt Samoa	Kings of Oceania 2004, New Zealand	KO	1	
2004-07-16	Win	(Papua New Guinea) Mitch O'Hello	Kings of Oceania 2004, New Zealand	KO	1	
2003-11-07	Loss	(New Zealand) Rony Sefo	K-1 New Zealand 2003, Auckland, New Zealand	Decision (Split)	3	3:00
2003-11-07	Win	(New Zealand) Keri Karena	K-1 New Zealand 2003, Auckland, New Zealand	Decision (Unanimous)	3	3:00
2003-07-27	Loss	(Australia) Peter Graham	K-1 World Grand Prix 2003 in Melbourne, Australia	Decision (Unanimous)	3	3:00
2003-07-27	Win	(New Zealand) Andrew Peck	K-1 World Grand Prix 2003 in Melbourne, Australia	KO (Left hook)	1	1:02
2003-07-27	Win	(Japan) Tsuyoshi	K-1 World Grand Prix 2003 in Melbourne, Australia	Decision (Unanimous)	3	3:00
2003-05-25	Win	(Australia) Paul Robinson	Urban Disturbance, Auckland, NZ	TKO (Three knockdowns)	1	2:34
2003-05-02	Win	(New Zealand) Hiriwa Te Rangi	Fanta @ The Emperor, Auckland, New Zealand	Decision	3	3:00
2003-04-11	Win	(Slovenia) Daniel Marhold	K-1 Lord of the Rings, Auckland, New Zealand	KO (Left middle kick)	3	
2002-11-08	Win	(New Zealand) Doug Viney	K-1 New Zealand 2002, New Zealand	KO	3	1:32
2002-11-08	Win	(New Zealand) Rony Sefo	K-1 New Zealand 2002, New Zealand	Decision	3	3:00
2002-11-08	Win	(New Zealand) Mike Angove	K-1 New Zealand 2002, New Zealand	KO	3	2:50
2002-07-12	Win	(Australia) Peter Graham	KB4 Fightnight, Sydney, Australia	Decision	3	3:00
2002-07-12	Win	(Australia) Paul Robinson	KB4 Fightnight, Sydney, Australia	Decision	3	3:00
2002-02-18	Loss	(Australia) Adam Watt	K-1 World Grand Prix 2002 Preliminary Melbourne, Sydney, Australia	Decision	3	3:00
2002-02-18	Win	(Australia) Nathan Briggs	K-1 World Grand Prix 2002 Preliminary Melbourne, Sydney, Australia	TKO (Low kicks)	2	2:02
2001-09-01	Draw	(Australia) Peter Graham	JNI Promotions, Star City, Australia	Decision draw	3	3:00
2001-07-21	Loss	(New Zealand) Hiriwa Te Rangi	K-1 New Zealand Grand Prix 2001, Auckland, New Zealand	KO (Spinning back fist)		
2001-06-08	Win	(Samoa) Auckland Aumitagi	WMTA Super Heavyweight title, Christchurch, New Zealand	Decision	5	2:00
2001-03-16	Win	(Thailand) Gyang Gai	YMCA Battleground, Auckland, New Zealand			
2000-12-05	Win	(Australia) Kevin Blanch	Summer Knockout, Auckland, New Zealand	KO		
2000-08-18	Win	(New Zealand) Najef Kanj	Power Station, Auckland, New Zealand	KO		
2000-06-29	Win	(Thailand) Kar Dong Yai	KGB Challenge II, Auckland, New Zealand	Decision	5	3:00
2000-03-23	Draw	(Thailand) Kar Dong Yai	NZ vs Thailand, Auckland, New Zealand	Decision draw	5	3:00
1999-11-11	Win	(Thailand) Kar Dong Yai	KGB Challenge I, Auckland, New Zealand	Decision	5	3:00
1999-10-07	Win	(Russia) Igor Ilkaev	NZ vs Russia, Auckland, New Zealand			
1998-01-23	Win	(England) Trevor Ambrose	ISKA Super Middleweight title, Auckland, New Zealand	Decision (Split)	5	2:00
1997-06-05	Win	(United States) Danny Bennett	NZ vs USA, UTC Super Middleweight title, Auckland, New Zealand			
1996-09-01	Win	(Netherlands) Ivan Hippolyte	K-1 Revenge 1996, Osaka, Japan	Decision	5	3:00
1995-10-19	Win	(Australia) John Wybourne	NZ vs Australia, Auckland, New Zealand			
1995-08-25	Win	(Thailand) Balia	NZ-AUS-USA, Auckland, New Zealand			

== Boxing record ==
3 Wins (3 decisions), 0 Losses
Date	Result	Opponent	Event	Method	Round	Time
2004-06-05	Win	(Australia) Lawrence Tuasa	Sky City Convention Centre, Auckland, New Zealand	Decision (Split)	4	3:00
2002-12-13	Win	(New Zealand) Richard Tutaki	Emperor Restaurant, Auckland, New Zealand	Decision	6	3:00
2001-12-13	Win	(New Zealand) John Argall	St.James Theatre, Auckland, New Zealand	Decision	4	3:00

== Mixed martial arts record ==
Res.	Record	Opponent	Method	Event	Date	Round	Time	Location	Notes
Loss	0–1	Sergei Kharitonov	Submission (armbar)	PRIDE Bushido 1	5 October 2003	1	2:25	Saitama, Japan	

== See also ==
- List of male kickboxers
- List of K-1 events
