= Melsik Baghdasaryan =

Armenian mixed martial artist

- Baghdasaryan in Las Vegas in 2023
- Born: January 28, 1992 (age 34); Yerevan, Armenia
- Nickname: The Gun
- Height: 5 ft 8 in (1.73 m)
- Weight: 145 lb (66 kg; 10 st 5 lb)
- Division: Lightweight; Featherweight
- Reach: 70 in (178 cm)
- Style: Kickboxing
- Fighting out of: Glendale, California
- Team: Glendale Fighting Club
- Years active: 2013–present

Professional boxing record
- Total: 3
- Wins: 3
- By knockout: 1

Kickboxing record
- Total: 11
- Wins: 9
- By knockout: 4
- Losses: 2
- By knockout: 1

Mixed martial arts record
- Total: 12
- Wins: 8
- By knockout: 5
- By decision: 3
- Losses: 4
- By knockout: 1
- By submission: 3

Other information
- Boxing record from BoxRec
- Mixed martial arts record from Sherdog

Melsik Baghdasaryan (born January 28, 1992) is an Armenian mixed martial artist, kickboxer and boxer, currently competing as a featherweight in the UFC. A professional competitor since 2013, he is the former Wu Lin Feng International champion, and one-time K-1 Welterweight title challenger.

== Kickboxing career ==
=== Early career ===
Baghdasaryan began training karate at six years old, before transitioning to kickboxing, and later, muay thai. He has spent most of his professional career at the Glendale Fighting Club.

Baghdasaryan was scheduled to fight Jermaine Soto at a GLORY event on September 28, 2013. He won the fight by unanimous decision.

Baghdasaryan fought during the WCK vs. Wulinfeng event in 2013, with his opponent being Xie Chuang. Baghdasaryan won the fight by a unanimous decision, while suffering a slight injury to his left thumb.

Baghdasaryan was scheduled to fight John Vargas at WCK Muay Thai: Matter of Pride, on February 15, 2014. He won the fight by a third-round TKO.

In 2014, he fought again under WCK Muay Thai, facing Chen Wei Chao. Melsik won the fight by a unanimous decision.

His kickboxing winning streak earned him a chance to fight for the Wu Lin Feng International title, held at the time by Qiu Jianliang. Baghdasaryan continued his winning streak with a majority decision win over the reigning champion.

=== Return to kickboxing ===
In his return to kickboxing, Baghdasaryan participated in the Wu Lin Feng 67 kg tournament, but lost in the quarter final round to Lu Jianbo, by a first-round KO. He bounced back with a decision wins over Wei Ninghui.

In 2017 Melsik took part in the K-1 Welterweight Grand Prix. He won a unanimous decision over Kazuki Yamagiwa in the quarter final bout, but an injury prevented him from taking further part in the tournament, and he was subsequently replaced by Yamagiwa.

His next fight with K-1 was against Yuta Kubo, winner of the 2017 Welterweight Grand Prix, for the K-1 Welterweight title. Kubo won the fight by a unanimous decision.

== Boxing career ==
After winning the WLF title, Melsik transitioned to boxing in 2015. He has had three professional fights to date. In his boxing debut he faced Mario Angeles. Angelas was unable to figure out how to fight against a southpaw and lost the fight in the third round, after a right to the body which forced the referee to stop the fight.

In his second boxing match, Melsik fought Abraham Calderon Ruiz, winning the fight through a unanimous decision. He then fought Diego Padilla, and won the match by a majority decision.

== Mixed martial arts career ==
=== Early career ===
After he suffered a submission loss in his MMA debut in 2014, Melsik waited until 2019 for his second MMA bout. Baghdasaryan amassed a four fight knockout winning streak, with a cumulative fight time of 62 seconds. In the last of those four fights, against Art Hernandez, he made his lightweight debut.

Baghdasaryan was given a chance to fight for a UFC contract at Dana White's Contender Series 31, when he faced Dennis Buzukja. He won the fight by a unanimous decision, but was not given a contract.

=== Ultimate Fighting Championship ===
In March 2021, Baghdasaryan signed with the UFC.

Baghdasaryan made his promotional debut against Collin Anglin at UFC on ESPN 28 on July 31, 2021. He won the fight via knockout in round two. This fight earned him the Performance of the Night award.

Baghdasaryan was scheduled to face T.J. Laramie November 6, 2021 at UFC 268. However, Laramie was forced to pull out due to diagnosed with MRSA. He was replaced by LFA Featherweight Champion Bruno Souza in his promotional debut. At the weigh-ins, Souza weighed in at 148.4 pounds, 2.4 pounds over the featherweight non-title fight limit. The bout proceeded at a catchweight and he forfeited 20% of his purse to Baghdasaryan. He won the bout via unanimous decision.

Baghdasaryan was scheduled to face T.J. Laramie on April 16, 2022, at UFC Fight Night 206. However, Melsik pulled out for unknown reasons.

Baghdasaryan was expected to face Joanderson Brito on October 15, 2022, at UFC Fight Night 212. However, Baghdasaryan pulled out in late September due to a broken hand.

Baghdasaryan faced Joshua Culibao on February 12, 2023, at UFC 284. He lost the fight via a rear-naked choke submission in the second round.

Baghdasaryan next faced Tucker Lutz at UFC on ESPN 49 on July 15, 2023, winning the bout via unanimous decision.

Baghdasaryan was scheduled to face William Gomis on February 3, 2024, UFC Fight Night 235. However, Gomis pulled out due to undisclosed reasons in early January.

Baghdasaryan was eventually rebooked a week later against Hyder Amil on February 10, 2024, at UFC Fight Night 236, replacing Shayilan Nuerdanbieke. In turn, Baghdasaryan pulled out on fight week due to injury and was replaced by Fernie Garcia.

Baghdasaryan was scheduled to face Muhammad Naimov on June 22, 2024 at UFC on ABC 6. However, Baghdasaryan pulled out during fight week due to a torn labrum in his left shoulder.

Baghdasaryan faced Jean Silva on February 22, 2025 at UFC Fight Night 252. He lost the fight by technical knockout in the first round.

Baghdasaryan was scheduled to face Joanderson Brito on December 13, 2025, at UFC on ESPN 73. However, Baghdasaryan withdrew from the bout for undisclosed reasons and was replaced by promotional newcomer Isaac Thomson.

Baghdasaryan faced promotional newcomer Murtazali Magomedov on June 20, 2026 at UFC Fight Night 279. He lost the fight via a twister submission in the first round.

== Championships and accomplishments ==
=== Mixed martial arts ===
- Ultimate Fighting Championship
  - Performance of the Night (One time) vs. Collin Anglin

=== Kickboxing ===
- Wu Lin Feng
  - WLF 67 kg International Championship

== Mixed martial arts record ==
Professional record breakdown
12 matches	8 wins	4 losses
By knockout	5	1
By submission	0	3
By decision	3	0

Res.	Record	Opponent	Method	Event	Date	Round	Time	Location	Notes
Loss	8–4	Murtazali Magomedov	Submission (twister)	UFC Fight Night: Kape vs. Horiguchi	June 20, 2026	1	1:17	Las Vegas, Nevada, United States	
Loss	8–3	Jean Silva	TKO (punches and elbows)	UFC Fight Night: Cejudo vs. Song	February 22, 2025	1	4:15	Seattle, Washington, United States	
Win	8–2	Tucker Lutz	Decision (unanimous)	UFC on ESPN: Holm vs. Bueno Silva	July 15, 2023	3	5:00	Las Vegas, Nevada, United States	
Loss	7–2	Joshua Culibao	Submission (rear-naked choke)	UFC 284	February 12, 2023	2	2:02	Perth, Australia	
Win	7–1	Bruno Souza	Decision (unanimous)	UFC 268	November 6, 2021	3	5:00	New York City, New York, United States	Catchweight (148.4 lb) bout; Souza missed weight.
Win	6–1	Collin Anglin	KO (head kick and punches)	UFC on ESPN: Hall vs. Strickland	July 31, 2021	2	1:50	Las Vegas, Nevada, United States	Performance of the Night.
Win	5–1	Dennis Buzukja	Decision (unanimous)	Dana White's Contender Series 31	September 1, 2020	3	5:00	Las Vegas, Nevada, United States	Return to Featherweight.
Win	4–1	Art Hernandez	KO (punch)	Lights Out Xtreme Fighting 3	September 21, 2019	1	0:07	Commerce, California, United States	Lightweight debut.
Win	3–1	Jay White	TKO (punches)	Gladiator Challenge: Berry vs. Baseman	June 1, 2019	1	0:09	San Jacinto, California, United States	
Win	2–1	Mauricio Diaz	TKO (punches)	Lights Out Xtreme Fighting 1	May 11, 2019	1	0:32	Burbank, California, United States	Catchweight (146.8 lb) bout; Baghdasaryan missed weight.
Win	1–1	Jason Gouvion	TKO (punches)	Gladiator Challenge: MMA World Championships	March 23, 2019	1	0:14	Lincoln, California, United States	
Loss	0–1	Jay Bogan	Submission (armbar)	Lights Out Promotions: Chaos at the Casino 4	April 12, 2014	1	1:26	Inglewood, California, United States	Featherweight debut; Bogan missed weight (147 lb).

== Kickboxing record ==
Professional kickboxing record
9 wins (4 (T)KOs), 2 losses, 0 draws, 0 no contests
Date	Result	Opponent	Event	Location	Method	Round	Time
March 31, 2018	Loss	(Japan) Yuta Kubo	K-1 World GP 2018: K'FESTA.1	Saitama, Japan	Decision (unanimous)	3	3:00
For the K-1 Welterweight title.
September 9, 2017	Win	(Japan) Kazuki Yamagiwa	K-1 World GP 2017 Welterweight Championship Tournament, Quarter Finals	Saitama, Japan	Decision (unanimous)	3	3:00
Baghdasaryan withdrew from the tournament due to injury.
November 17, 2016	Win	(China) Wei Ninghui	Wu Lin Feng 2016: China vs USA	Las Vegas, United States	Decision (unanimous)	3	3:00
January 23, 2016	Loss	(China) Lu Jianbo	Wu Lin Feng 2016: World Kickboxing Championship in Shanghai	Shanghai, China	KO (straight right)	1	
November 1, 2014	Win	(China) Qiu Jianliang	Wu Lin Feng & WCK Muaythai: China vs USA	Las Vegas, United States	Decision (majority)	3	3:00
Fight Was For Wu Lin Feng International Championship -67 kg.
June 9, 2014	Win	(China) Chen Wei Chao	WCK Muay Thai: International Showdown	Temecula, California, United States	Decision (split)	3	3:00
February 15, 2014	Win	(United States) John Vargas	WCK Muay Thai: Matter of Pride	Temecula, California, United States	TKO	3	
November 2, 2013	Win	(China) Xie Chuang	WCK vs. Wulinfeng 2013	Las Vegas, United States	Decision (unanimous)	3	3:00
September 28, 2013	Win	(United States) Jermaine Soto	Road to GLORY	Ontario, California, United States	Decision (unanimous)	3	3:00
Legend: Win Loss Draw/no contest Notes

== Professional boxing record ==
3 fights	3 wins	0 losses
By knockout	1	0
By decision	2	0

No.	Result	Record	Opponent	Type	Round, time	Date	Location	Notes
3	Win	3–0	(Mexico) Diego Padilla	MD	4	Oct 23, 2015	(United States) Fantasy Springs Resort Casino, Indio, California, U.S.	
2	Win	2–0	(Mexico) Abraham Calderon Ruiz	UD	4	Jul 2, 2015	(United States) Belasco Theater, Los Angeles, California, U.S.	
1	Win	1–0	(Mexico) Mario Angeles	KO	3 (4), 2:10	Apr 2, 2015	(United States) Belasco Theater, Los Angeles, California, U.S.	

== See also ==
- List of male mixed martial artists
- List of male kickboxers
