= Magomed Mustafaev =

Russian mixed martial arts fighter

- Born: August 2, 1988 (age 38); Gergebilsky District, Dagestan ASSR, Russian SFSR, Soviet Union
- Other names: Sniper
- Nationality: Russian
- Height: 5 ft 9 in (1.75 m)
- Weight: 155 lb (70 kg; 11.1 st)
- Division: Middleweight; Welterweight; Lightweight
- Reach: 71 in (180 cm)
- Stance: Southpaw
- Fighting out of: Sochi, Krasnodar Krai, Russia; Makhachkala, Dagestan, Russia
- Team: Sochi Star Club; Berkut Fight Club; American Top Team
- Trainer: Mansur Uchakaev; Agop Topchyan
- Years active: 2011–2020

Mixed martial arts record
- Total: 17
- Wins: 14
- By knockout: 10
- By submission: 4
- Losses: 3
- By submission: 2
- By decision: 1

Other information
- Mixed martial arts record from Sherdog

Magomed Mustafayevich Mustafayev (Russian: Магомед Мустафаевич Мустафаев; born August 2, 1988) is a Russian mixed martial artist, who competed in the Lightweight division of the UFC. A professional competitor since 2011, he has also competed for M-1 Global.

== Background ==
Magomed Mustafaev was born on February 8, 1988, in the village of Aimaki in modern-day Dagestan. He began training in freestyle wrestling while in elementary school. After high school, he moved to Sochi and started training MMA. He is the winner of the Pankration Black Sea Cup.

== Mixed martial arts career ==
=== Early career ===
Mustafaev made his professional mixed martial arts debut on April 29, 2011, defeating fellow Russian Marat Medzhidov by TKO in the first round. The first loss on his professional record came in his next fight less than three months later against Dagestani Arsen Ubaidulaev due to a rear-naked choke.

Mustafaev faced to Russian MMA prospect Andrei Koshkin on March 14, 2014, at M-1 Challenge 46. He won via submission in the second round.

On September 1, 2014, Mustafaev competed in the Sochi Star 2014 Welterweight Grand Prix. Mustafaev defeated Amirkhan Adaev and Gleb Morozov both by KO in the first round. Mustafaev followed up with another winning performance against Russian MMA prospect and WSOF fighter Abubakar Nurmagomedov (cousin of Khabib Nurmagomedov) to claim the tournament victory and propel himself into consideration for a shot in a top tier MMA promotion.

=== Ultimate Fighting Championship ===
Following the tournament victory and a 10 fight win streak in various Russian MMA events, Mustafaev signed with the Ultimate Fighting Championship on November 6, 2014. In his move from Russian MMA promotions to the UFC, Mustafaev transitioned from Welterweight to the Lightweight division.

Mustafaev first fought in the UFC opposite Piotr Hallmann on June 20, 2015, at UFC Fight Night 69 in Berlin, Germany. Mustafaev won by TKO (doctor's stoppage) in the second round due to multiple cuts around the eyes of Hallmann.

Mustafaev faced Joe Proctor at UFC 194 on December 12, 2015. He won the fight via TKO in the first round after a liver kick.

Mustafaev faced Kevin Lee at UFC Fight Night 99 on November 19, 2016. He suffered an arm injury and lost the fight by submission due to a rear naked choke in the second round.

After an extended hiatus, due in part to an arm injury suffered in his last fight, Musafaev faced promotional newcomer Rafael Fiziev on April 20, 2019, at UFC Fight Night 149. Mustafaev won the fight by first round technical knockout. This win earned him the Performance of the Night award.

Mustafaev was expected to face Don Madge on September 7, 2019, at UFC 242. However, on August 18, 2019, it was reported that Mustafaev was removed from the bout for undisclosed reasons.

Mustafaev faced Brad Riddell on February 23, 2020, at UFC Fight Night: Felder vs. Hooker. He lost the fight via split decision.

Mustafaev was scheduled to face Renato Moicano on October 18, 2020 at UFC Fight Night 180. However, Moicano pulled out of the fight in mid-September for undisclosed reasons, and he was replaced by Mateusz Gamrot. In turn, the bout was scrapped entirely for undisclosed reasons.

Mustafaev was expected to face Damir Ismagulov on October 30, 2021, at UFC 267. However at the weigh-ins, Ismagulov came in at 163.5 pounds, missing weight by 7.5 pounds, the bout was subsequently canceled by the UFC.

Mustafaev was scheduled to face Jamie Mullarkey on October 22, 2022, at UFC 280. However, Mullarkey pulled out in mid-September due to injury, and he was replaced by Yamato Nishikawa. In turn, Nishikawa was forced to withdraw due to contractual issues. The bout was ultimately scrapped from the card.

In late October 2022, it was reported that Mustafaev was released by the UFC.

== Championships and accomplishments ==
=== Mixed martial artist ===
- Ultimate Fighting Championship
  - Performance of the Night (One time) vs. Rafael Fiziev
  - UFC.com Awards
    - 2015: Ranked #7 Newcomer of the Year

== Mixed martial arts record ==
Professional record breakdown
17 matches	14 wins	3 losses
By knockout	10	0
By submission	4	2
By decision	0	1

Res.	Record	Opponent	Method	Event	Date	Round	Time	Location	Notes
Loss	14–3	Brad Riddell	Decision (split)	UFC Fight Night: Felder vs. Hooker	February 23, 2020	3	5:00	Auckland, New Zealand	
Win	14–2	Rafael Fiziev	TKO (spinning back kick and punches)	UFC Fight Night: Overeem vs. Oleinik	April 20, 2019	1	1:26	Saint Petersburg, Russia	Performance of the Night.
Loss	13–2	Kevin Lee	Technical Submission (rear-naked choke)	UFC Fight Night: Mousasi vs. Hall 2	November 19, 2016	2	4:31	Belfast, Northern Ireland	
Win	13–1	Joe Proctor	TKO (knees and punches)	UFC 194	December 12, 2015	1	1:54	Las Vegas, Nevada, United States	
Win	12–1	Piotr Hallmann	TKO (doctor stoppage)	UFC Fight Night: Jędrzejczyk vs. Penne	June 20, 2015	2	3:24	Berlin, Germany	Return to Lightweight.
Win	11–1	Abubakar Nurmagomedov	TKO (doctor stoppage)	Sochi Star Club: Sochi Star Tournament 1	September 1, 2014	1	4:11	Sochi, Russia	
Win	10–1	Amirkhan Adaev	KO (slam)	Sochi Star Club: Sochi Star Tournament 1	September 1, 2014	1	1:38	Sochi, Russia	
Win	9–1	Andrei Koshkin	Verbal Submission (heel hook)	M-1 Challenge 46	March 14, 2014	2	0:39	Saint Petersburg, Russia	
Win	8–1	Lom-Ali Nalgiev	Submission (rear-naked choke)	Legion Fight 18	December 26, 2013	2	2:45	Sochi, Russia	Lightweight bout.
Win	7–1	Guseyn Omarov	TKO (doctor stoppage)	Legion Fight 17	November 28, 2013	2	1:39	Vladikavkaz, Russia	
Win	6–1	Islam Begidov	KO (punches)	Legion Fight 15	September 15, 2013	1	1:55	Sochi, Russia	
Win	5–1	Artyom Egorov	Submission (armbar)	Legion Fight 15	September 15, 2013	1	1:55	Sochi, Russia	Return to Welterweight.
Win	4–1	Vadim Ogar	Submission (triangle choke)	Legion Fight 12	January 16, 2013	1	1:15	Sochi, Russia	
Win	3–1	Dmitry Korobeynikov	TKO (punches)	Legion Fight 12	January 16, 2013	1	2:40	Sochi, Russia	
Win	2–1	Sakhil Askarov	TKO (corner stoppage)	Legion Fight 10	March 10, 2012	2	2:20	Sochi, Russia	Lightweight debut.
Loss	1–1	Arsen Ubaidulaev	Submission (rear-naked choke)	Legion Fight 9	July 8, 2011	2	3:20	Sochi, Russia	Middleweight debut.
Win	1–0	Marat Medzhidov	TKO (punches)	Legion Fight 7	April 29, 2011	1	4:55	Sochi, Russia	Welterweight debut.

== See also ==
- List of male mixed martial artists
