= Douglas Silva de Andrade =

Brazilian mixed martial arts fighter

- Born: June 22, 1985 (age 41); Castanhal, Pará, Brazil
- Other names: D'Silva
- Height: 5 ft 6 in (1.68 m)
- Weight: 61.25 kg (135 lb; 9 st 9 lb)
- Division: Bantamweight (2015–2018, 2021–present); Featherweight (2007–2014, 2019–2021)
- Reach: 68 in (173 cm)
- Style: Boxing, BJJ
- Fighting out of: Castanhal, Pará, Brazil
- Team: Corinthians MMA; Nabruta Fight Team; NFT Castanhal
- Years active: 2010–present

Mixed martial arts record
- Total: 37
- Wins: 29
- By knockout: 20
- By submission: 2
- By decision: 7
- Losses: 7
- By knockout: 2
- By submission: 1
- By decision: 4
- No contests: 1

Other information
- Mixed martial arts record from Sherdog

Douglas Silva de Andrade (born June 22, 1985) is a Brazilian mixed martial artist who competed in Bantamweight and Featherweight divisions of the Ultimate Fighting Championship (UFC).

== Background ==
Silva de Andrade grew up in Castanhal, Brazil. He has an older sister. He became interested in martial arts in his early teens and continued to train only with his friend long into his professional career.

== Mixed martial arts career ==
=== Early career ===
Silva de Andrade began his professional mixed martial arts career in 2007. He competed on the regional circuit in Pará, Brazil, notably for Super Pitbull Fight, Carmen Casca-Grossa Fight, Amazon Fight and Shooto Brazil. He amassed a record of 21–0 with 1 non-contest prior joining UFC.

=== Ultimate Fighting Championship ===
Silva de Andrade made his promotional debut on a short notice, replacing injured Thiago Tavares on February 15, 2014 at UFC Fight Night: Machida vs. Mousasi against Zubaira Tukhugov. He lost the fight via unanimous decision.

Silva de Andrade was expected to face Rob Font at UFC 175 in July 2014. However he ceded his place on the card due to injury and was replaced by George Roop.

He next faced Cody Gibson at UFC Fight Night: Bigfoot vs Mir on February 22, 2015. Silva de Andrade rebounded with a victory over Gibson with a unanimous decision.

After 21 months layoff from the recoveries of three surgeries, Silva de Andrade returned to octagon to fight Henry Briones at The Ultimate Fighter Latin America 3 Finale: dos Anjos vs. Ferguson on November 5, 2016. He knocked out Briones via a spinning backfist and won the fight. He also earned a Performance of the Night bonus.

Silva de Andrade faced Rob Font on July 8, 2017 at UFC 213. He lost the fight via submission in the second round.

Silva de Andrade faced Marlon Vera on February 3, 2018 at UFC Fight Night 125. He won the fight via unanimous decision.

Silva de Andrade was briefly scheduled to meet Petr Yan on September 15, 2018 at the UFC Fight Night 136. However, Andrade pulled out of the fight on August 9 citing a foot injury. The pair was rescheduled to meet on December 29, 2018 at UFC 232. He lost the fight via technical knockout in round two after his corner stopped the fight in between rounds.

Silva de Andrade faced Renan Barão in a featherweight bout on November 16, 2019 at UFC Fight Night 164. He won the fight by unanimous decision.

Silva de Andrade was scheduled to face Movsar Evloev on March 7, 2020 at UFC 249. However, de Andrade withdrew from the bout due to injury and he was replaced by newcomer Jamall Emmers.

Silva de Andrade faced Lerone Murphy on January 20, 2021 at UFC on ESPN 20. He lost the bout via unanimous decision.

Silva de Andrade faced Gaetano Pirrello on October 2, 2021 at UFC Fight Night 193. He won the fight via knockout in round one. This win earned him the Performance of the Night award.

Silva de Andrade faced Sergey Morozov on February 12, 2022 at UFC 271. After a dominant round one from Morozov, Silva de Andrade won the bout via second round technical submission after dropping Morozov multiple times and then choking Morozov unconscious with a rear-naked choke. The bout earned the Fight of the Night bonus award.

Silva de Andrade faced Said Nurmagomedov on July 9, 2022 at UFC on ESPN 39. He lost the fight via unanimous decision.

Silva de Andrade faced Cody Stamann on May 13, 2023 at UFC on ABC 4. He won the bout via unanimous decision.

Silva de Andrade faced Miles Johns on June 15, 2024, at UFC on ESPN 58. He lost the fight by unanimous decision.

Silva de Andrade was scheduled to face John Castañeda on March 1, 2025 at UFC Fight Night 253. However, despite having the bout changed to a 140 pound catchweight bout, the fight was cancelled as Silva de Andrade did not have medical clearance to compete. It was later revealed that Andrade was suspended as a result of testing positive for the presence of furosemide six months from the date of the test, which made him eligible for competition on August 28, 2025.

Returning to Featherweight, Silva de Andrade faced promotional newcomer Javier Reyes on February 28, 2026 at UFC Fight Night 268. He lost the fight by technical knockout at the end of the first round.

On November 20, 2026, it was reported that Silva de Andrade was removed from the UFC roster.

== Personal life ==
Silva de Andrade and his wife Meiriane have a daughter, Eva (born 2021).

== Championships and accomplishments ==
=== Mixed martial arts ===
- Ultimate Fighting Championship
  - Performance of the Night (Two times) vs. Henry Briones and Gaetano Pirrello
  - Fight of the Night (One time) vs. Sergey Morozov
- MMAjunkie.com
  - 2022 February Fight of the Month vs. Sergey Morozov

== Mixed martial arts record ==
Professional record breakdown
| 37 matches | 29 wins | 7 losses |
| By knockout | 20 | 2 |
| By submission | 2 | 1 |
| By decision | 7 | 4 |
| No contests | 1 | |

| Res. | Record | Opponent | Method | Event | Date | Round | Time | Location | Notes |
|---|---|---|---|---|---|---|---|---|---|
| Loss | 29–7 (1) | Javier Reyes | TKO (punches) | UFC Fight Night: Moreno vs. Kavanagh | February 28, 2026 | 1 | 4:59 | Mexico City, Mexico | Return to Featherweight. |
| Loss | 29–6 (1) | Miles Johns | Decision (unanimous) | UFC on ESPN: Perez vs. Taira | June 15, 2024 | 3 | 5:00 | Las Vegas, Nevada, United States | |
| Win | 29–5 (1) | Cody Stamann | Decision (unanimous) | UFC on ABC: Rozenstruik vs. Almeida | May 13, 2023 | 3 | 5:00 | Charlotte, North Carolina, United States | Catchweight (140 lb) bout. |
| Loss | 28–5 (1) | Said Nurmagomedov | Decision (unanimous) | UFC on ESPN: dos Anjos vs. Fiziev | July 9, 2022 | 3 | 5:00 | Las Vegas, Nevada, United States | |
| Win | 28–4 (1) | Sergey Morozov | Technical Submission (rear-naked choke) | UFC 271 | February 12, 2022 | 2 | 3:24 | Houston, Texas, United States | Fight of the Night. |
| Win | 27–4 (1) | Gaetano Pirrello | KO (punch) | UFC Fight Night: Santos vs. Walker | October 2, 2021 | 1 | 2:04 | Las Vegas, Nevada, United States | Return to Bantamweight. Performance of the Night. |
| Loss | 26–4 (1) | Lerone Murphy | Decision (unanimous) | UFC on ESPN: Chiesa vs. Magny | January 20, 2021 | 3 | 5:00 | Abu Dhabi, United Arab Emirates | |
| Win | 26–3 (1) | Renan Barão | Decision (unanimous) | UFC Fight Night: Błachowicz vs. Jacaré | November 16, 2019 | 3 | 5:00 | São Paulo, Brazil | Return to Featherweight. |
| Loss | 25–3 (1) | Petr Yan | TKO (corner stoppage) | UFC 232 | December 29, 2018 | 2 | 5:00 | Inglewood, California, United States | |
| Win | 25–2 (1) | Marlon Vera | Decision (unanimous) | UFC Fight Night: Machida vs. Anders | February 3, 2018 | 3 | 5:00 | Belém, Brazil | |
| Loss | 24–2 (1) | Rob Font | Submission (guillotine choke) | UFC 213 | July 8, 2017 | 2 | 4:36 | Las Vegas, Nevada, United States | |
| Win | 24–1 (1) | Henry Briones | TKO (elbow and spinning back fist) | The Ultimate Fighter Latin America 3 Finale: dos Anjos vs. Ferguson | November 5, 2016 | 3 | 2:33 | Mexico City, Mexico | Performance of the Night. |
| Win | 23–1 (1) | Cody Gibson | Decision (unanimous) | UFC Fight Night: Bigfoot vs. Mir | February 22, 2015 | 3 | 5:00 | Porto Alegre, Brazil | Bantamweight debut. |
| Loss | 22–1 (1) | Zubaira Tukhugov | Decision (unanimous) | UFC Fight Night: Machida vs. Mousasi | February 15, 2014 | 3 | 5:00 | Jaraguá do Sul, Brazil | |
| Win | 22–0 (1) | Tiago Passos | KO (punch) | Jungle Fight 63 | December 21, 2013 | 1 | 0:25 | Belém, Brazil | |
| Win | 21–0 (1) | Fabiano Fernandes | TKO (punches) | Jungle Fight 60 | November 2, 2013 | 1 | 1:40 | São Paulo, Brazil | |
| Win | 20–0 (1) | Luiz Antônio Lobo Gavinho | TKO (punches) | Jungle Fight 52 | May 4, 2013 | 2 | 2:17 | Belém, Brazil | |
| Win | 19–0 (1) | Abenilson Cardoso | TKO (punches) | Advangers Fight | July 12, 2012 | 1 | 3:54 | Castanhal, Brazil | |
| Win | 18–0 (1) | Felipe Froes | KO (head kick) | Shooto Brazil 30 | June 3, 2012 | 3 | 3:49 | Belém, Brazil | |
| Win | 17–0 (1) | Eunapio Edson Freitas | KO (head kick) | Super Pitbull Fight | April 13, 2012 | 1 | 3:25 | Castanhal, Brazil | |
| Win | 16–0 (1) | Giovane Fernandes | TKO (punches) | Amazon Fight 11 | February 16, 2012 | 2 | 3:04 | Castanhal, Brazil | |
| Win | 15–0 (1) | Neliton José Serrão Furtado | Decision (unanimous) | Amazon Fight 10 | December 7, 2011 | 3 | 5:00 | Belém, Brazil | |
| Win | 14–0 (1) | João Ferreira Jr. | Decision (split) | Super Pitbull Fight 28 | December 1, 2011 | 3 | 5:00 | Castanhal, Brazil | |
| Win | 13–0 (1) | Cleison Cardoso | KO (punches) | Super Pitbull Fight | September 1, 2011 | 3 | 4:58 | Castanhal, Brazil | |
| Win | 12–0 (1) | Anderson Macaco | TKO (punches) | Super Pitbull Fight | June 13, 2011 | 1 | 2:30 | Castanhal, Brazil | |
| Win | 11–0 (1) | Antônio Marcos | TKO (punches) | Super Pitbull Fight | June 10, 2011 | 1 | 2:39 | Igarapé-Açu, Brazil | |
| Win | 10–0 (1) | Marcelo Rodrigues | KO (knees) | Carmen Casca-Grossa Fight | July 3, 2010 | 1 | 0:16 | Ananindeua, Brazil | |
| Win | 9–0 (1) | Daziel Serafim da Silva Jr. | TKO (punches) | Super Pitbull Fight | May 22, 2010 | 3 | 2:17 | Castanhal, Brazil | |
| Win | 8–0 (1) | João Ferreira Jr. | TKO (doctor stoppage) | Super Pitbull Fight | April 9, 2010 | 1 | 0:27 | Castanhal, Brazil | |
| Win | 7–0 (1) | Antônio Carlos Fernandes | TKO (head kick) | Super Pitbull Fight | December 27, 2009 | 2 | 1:30 | Castanhal, Brazil | |
| Win | 6–0 (1) | Denis Pitbull | KO (punches) | Super Pitbull Fight: King of the Ring | November 14, 2009 | 2 | 2:33 | Castanhal, Brazil | |
| Win | 5–0 (1) | Denis Pitbull | KO (knees) | Super Pitbull Fight: King Champions | August 8, 2009 | 1 | 1:49 | Castanhal, Brazil | |
| Win | 4–0 (1) | Junior Teixeira | TKO (retirement) | Super Pitbull Fight 10 | June 26, 2009 | 3 | 2:30 | Capanema, Brazil | |
| Win | 3–0 (1) | Maykson Souza Lima | Decision (unanimous) | Super Pitbull Fight 9 | May 9, 2009 | 5 | 5:00 | Castanhal, Brazil | |
| Win | 2–0 (1) | Jorge Rodrigues | Submission (rear-naked choke) | Super Pitbull Fight 3 | March 7, 2008 | 1 | 4:57 | Castanhal, Brazil | |
| NC | 1–0 (1) | Deivison Francisco Ribeiro | No Contest (knee to the groin) | Super Pitbull Fight | August 12, 2007 | 1 | 2:00 | Castanhal, Brazil | |
| Win | 1–0 | Deivison Francisco Ribeiro | TKO (corner stoppage) | Open Fight de Vale Tudo 2 | May 11, 2007 | 2 | 4:19 | Castanhal, Brazil | |

== See also ==
- List of male mixed martial artists
