= Jalin Turner =

American mixed martial artist (born 1995)

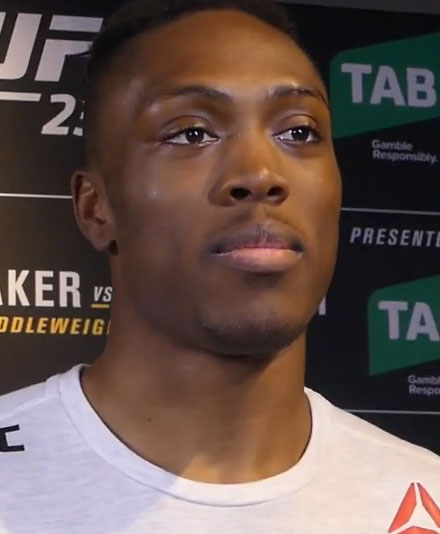
- Jalin Turner at UFC 234
- Born: May 18, 1995 (age 31); San Bernardino, California, U.S.
- Other names: The Tarantula
- Height: 6 ft 3 in (191 cm)
- Weight: 156 lb (71 kg; 11.1 st)
- Division: Welterweight (2018); Lightweight (2019-present)
- Reach: 77 in (196 cm)
- Fighting out of: Fontana, California, U.S.
- Team: RVCA Training Center
- Rank: Brown belt in Brazilian Jiu-Jitsu
- Years active: 2016–present

Mixed martial arts record
- Total: 25
- Wins: 16
- By knockout: 12
- By submission: 4
- Losses: 9
- By knockout: 4
- By submission: 1
- By decision: 4

Other information
- Mixed martial arts record from Sherdog

Jalin Turner (/ˈdʒeɪlɪn/ JAY-lin; born May 18, 1995) is an American professional mixed martial artist who currently competes in the lightweight division of the Ultimate Fighting Championship (UFC). A professional since 2016, he has also competed for Bellator MMA, the World Series of Fighting, King of the Cage, and Tachi Palace Fights.

== Background ==
Born in San Bernardino, California, Turner attended Summit High School and has described that he grew up in a rough neighbourhood. In high school he was unable to play much sports such as football, basketball or track and field due to multiple injuries. Having the most talent in wrestling, Turner took up the sport during the pre-season of his sophomore year, but was unable to compete that season due to a broken finger. Frustrated by the recurring injuries, he started watching MMA bouts on television, which inspired him to try and practice the sport. With little money as a teenager and unable to afford combat training equipment, he would run and shadow box and used his family couch as a punching bag, until he joined Team Adrenaline which kickstarted his mixed martial arts career. Growing up, Turner was arachnophobic, and to overcome that fear, he began to collect tarantulas as pets. When he made his UFC debut he had 200 of them, earning his ring nickname "The Tarantula". At UFC Vegas 10 Turner had his official weight taken while holding a tarantula in his left hand.

== Mixed martial arts career ==
=== Early career ===
After compiling an amateur record of 5–2, Turner started his professional MMA career since 2016 and fought primarily in his home state of California. He amassed a record of 7–3, with two-fight winning streak including a technical knockout win against Noah Tillis in Bellator 192, before being signed by the UFC.

In a September 2018 interview with UFC, Turner said he held a purple belt in jiu-jitsu. In January 2022, Compex, a corporate sponsor, reported Jalin was a brown belt in Brazilian jiu-jitsu.

=== Dana White's Tuesday Night Contender Series ===
Turner faced Max Mustaki on June 19, 2018 at Dana White's Contender Series 12, winning by technical knockout in round one.

=== Ultimate Fighting Championship ===
Turner made his UFC debut against Vicente Luque on October 6, 2018 at UFC 229, losing by knockout in the first round.

In his second UFC fight Turner was scheduled to face Alex Gorgees at UFC 234. However, on January 23, 2019, it was reported that Gorgees had pulled out of the fight, and was replaced by Callan Potter. Turner won the fight via knockout in the first round.

Turner faced Matt Frevola on April 13, 2019 at UFC 236. He lost the fight by unanimous decision.

Turner was scheduled to face Jamie Mullarkey on February 23, 2020 at UFC Fight Night 168. However Mullarkey was forced to withdraw from the bout due to injury and he was replaced by Joshua Culibao. Turner won the fight via TKO in the second round.

Turner was scheduled to face Thiago Moisés on September 5, 2020 at UFC Fight Night 176. However, on September 5, 2020, Moisés tested positive for COVID-19 and the bout against Turner was cancelled. In turn, Turner was quickly rescheduled and faced Brok Weaver on September 12, 2020 at UFC Fight Night 177. After knocking Weaver down multiple times, Turner won the fight via a rear–naked choke submission in round two.

In January 2024, Turner attained his highest ranking at #9 in the UFC lightweight division.

Turner faced Uroš Medić on September 25, 2021 at UFC 266. He won the fight via rear naked choke in round one.

Turner faced Jamie Mullarkey on March 5, 2022 at UFC 272. He won the fight via technical knockout in round two.

Turner faced Brad Riddell on July 2, 2022, at UFC 276. He won the bout via guillotine choke submission less than a minute into the contest. This win earned him a Performance of the Night award.

Turner was scheduled to face Dan Hooker on March 4, 2023, at UFC 285. However, Hooker was forced to withdraw from the event, citing a hand injury, and he was replaced by Mateusz Gamrot. In a closely contested bout where Gamrot employed his wrestling to combat Turner's reach advantage, Turner lost by split decision.

Turner faced Dan Hooker on July 8, 2023 at UFC 290. At the weigh-ins Turner weighed in at 158 pounds, 2 pounds over the non-title lightweight limit. As a result, the bout proceeded as a catchweight and Turner was fined 20% of his fight purse, which went to Hooker. In a back and forth bout, Turner came out losing the bout via split decision.

Turner stepped in on one week's notice to face Bobby Green on December 2, 2023, at UFC on ESPN 52, as a replacement for an injured Dan Hooker. He won the fight via knockout in the first round. This fight earned him the Performance of the Night award.

Turner faced Renato Moicano on April 13, 2024, at UFC 300. Despite scoring an early knockdown, Turner lost the fight via TKO in the second round.

Turner faced Ignacio Bahamondes on March 8, 2025 at UFC 313. He lost the fight via a triangle choke submission in the first round. After the bout, he left his gloves in the middle of the octagon and appeared to retire from mixed martial arts competition.

=== Return to UFC ===
Turner made his return to the UFC against Edson Barboza on December 6, 2025 at UFC 323. He won the fight by technical knockout in the first round.

Turner faced Kauê Fernandes on August 15, 2026 at UFC 330. He won the fight by knockout in the first round. This fight earned him a $100,000 Performance of the Night award.

== Championships and awards ==
=== Mixed martial arts ===
- Ultimate Fighting Championship
  - Performance of the Night (Three times) vs. Brad Riddell, Bobby Green and Kauê Fernandes
  - UFC.com Awards
    - 2023: Ranked #6 Fight of the Year vs. Dan Hooker

== Mixed martial arts record ==
Professional record breakdown
25 matches	16 wins	9 losses
By knockout	12	4
By submission	4	1
By decision	0	4

Res.	Record	Opponent	Method	Event	Date	Round	Time	Location	Notes
Win	16–9	Kauê Fernandes	KO (punches)	UFC 330	August 15, 2026	1	0:39	Philadelphia, Pennsylvania, United States	Performance of the Night.
Win	15–9	Edson Barboza	TKO (punches)	UFC 323	December 6, 2025	1	2:24	Las Vegas, Nevada, United States	
Loss	14–9	Ignacio Bahamondes	Submission (triangle choke)	UFC 313	March 8, 2025	1	2:29	Las Vegas, Nevada, United States	
Loss	14–8	Renato Moicano	TKO (elbows and punches)	UFC 300	April 13, 2024	2	4:11	Las Vegas, Nevada, United States	
Win	14–7	Bobby Green	KO (punches)	UFC on ESPN: Dariush vs. Tsarukyan	December 2, 2023	1	2:49	Austin, Texas, United States	Performance of the Night.
Loss	13–7	Dan Hooker	Decision (split)	UFC 290	July 8, 2023	3	5:00	Las Vegas, Nevada, United States	Catchweight (158 lb) bout; Turner missed weight.
Loss	13–6	Mateusz Gamrot	Decision (split)	UFC 285	March 4, 2023	3	5:00	Las Vegas, Nevada, United States	
Win	13–5	Brad Riddell	Submission (guillotine choke)	UFC 276	July 2, 2022	1	0:45	Las Vegas, Nevada, United States	Performance of the Night.
Win	12–5	Jamie Mullarkey	TKO (punches)	UFC 272	March 5, 2022	2	0:46	Las Vegas, Nevada, United States	
Win	11–5	Uroš Medić	Submission (rear-naked choke)	UFC 266	September 25, 2021	1	4:01	Las Vegas, Nevada, United States	
Win	10–5	Brok Weaver	Submission (rear-naked choke)	UFC Fight Night: Waterson vs. Hill	September 12, 2020	2	4:20	Las Vegas, Nevada, United States	Catchweight (165 lb) bout.
Win	9–5	Joshua Culibao	TKO (punches)	UFC Fight Night: Felder vs. Hooker	February 23, 2020	2	3:01	Auckland, New Zealand	
Loss	8–5	Matt Frevola	Decision (unanimous)	UFC 236	April 13, 2019	3	5:00	Atlanta, Georgia, United States	
Win	8–4	Callan Potter	TKO (punches)	UFC 234	February 10, 2019	1	0:53	Melbourne, Australia	Return to Lightweight.
Loss	7–4	Vicente Luque	KO (punches)	UFC 229	October 6, 2018	1	3:52	Las Vegas, Nevada, United States	Welterweight debut.
Win	7–3	Max Mustaki	TKO (doctor stoppage)	Dana White's Contender Series 12	July 10, 2018	1	5:00	Las Vegas, Nevada, United States	
Win	6–3	Noah Tillis	TKO (punches)	Bellator 192	January 20, 2018	1	1:12	Inglewood, California, United States	
Win	5–3	Vytautas Sadauskas	Submission (triangle choke)	KOTC: Never Quit	September 2, 2017	1	1:39	Ontario, California, United States	
Loss	4–3	Richard LeRoy	TKO (punches)	California Xtreme Fighting 8	June 17, 2017	3	4:18	Burbank, California, United States	
Win	4–2	Paradise Vaovasa	KO (knee to the body)	Tachi Palace Fights 31	May 18, 2017	1	1:30	Lemoore, California, United States	
Win	3–2	Gabriel Green	KO (punches)	Bellator 170	January 21, 2017	1	0:36	Inglewood, California, United States	
Loss	2–2	Andrew Lagdaan	Decision (split)	SMASH Global 4	September 15, 2016	3	5:00	Los Angeles, California, United States	
Loss	2–1	Ronnie Borja	KO (punches)	California Fight League 8	July 30, 2016	1	0:11	Victorville, California, United States	
Win	2–0	Adrian Ajoleza	TKO (body kick)	BAMMA Badbeat 20	June 10, 2016	1	4:55	Commerce, California, United States	Catchweight (160 lb) bout.
Win	1–0	Eric Steans	KO (punch)	WSOF 28	February 20, 2016	1	0:32	Garden Grove, California, United States	Lightweight debut.

== See also ==
- List of current UFC fighters
- List of Dana White's Contender Series alumni
- List of male mixed martial artists
