= Brad Riddell =

New Zealander mixed martial arts fighter

- Born: 30 September 1991 (age 35); Christchurch, New Zealand
- Other names: Quake
- Height: 5 ft 8 in (1.73 m)
- Weight: 155 lb (70 kg; 11 st 1 lb)
- Division: Lightweight
- Reach: 71 in (180 cm)
- Style: Kickboxing
- Fighting out of: Auckland, New Zealand
- Team: City Kickboxing; Bangtao Muay Thai & MMA; Tiger Muay Thai (former)
- Rank: Brown Belt in Brazilian Jiu-Jitsu under Andre Galvao
- Years active: 2013–2022 (MMA); 2009–2019 (kickboxing); 2015 (boxing)

Professional boxing record
- Total: 1
- Wins: 0
- Losses: 1
- Draws: 0

Kickboxing record
- Total: 70
- Wins: 60
- Losses: 10
- Draws: 0

Mixed martial arts record
- Total: 14
- Wins: 10
- By knockout: 5
- By decision: 5
- Losses: 4
- By knockout: 1
- By submission: 3

Other information
- Mixed martial arts record from Sherdog

Brad Riddell (born 30 September 1991) is a New Zealand mixed martial artist and former kickboxer, who competed in the Lightweight division of the Ultimate Fighting Championship (UFC).

== Early life ==
Riddell played rugby union throughout his upbringing before quitting the sport to focus on martial arts.

== Kickboxing ==
Riddell won several kickboxing championships around New Zealand during his rise through the regional scene. He also fought professional Muay Thai and kickboxing fights, fighting to a split decision with Glory welterweight champion, Cédric Doumbé, and losing a competitive decision to ONE lightweight champion, Regian Eersel. He also has wins against the likes of famed Aussie kickboxer John Wayne Parr.

== Professional boxing career ==
In November 2015, Riddell took part in the four man Super 8 Boxing Tournament in his professional boxing debut. Riddell took on Reece Papuni in the semi-finals of the tournament. The ended in a draw in the third round, which lead to the fight going one extra round. Riddell lost the fight by unanimous decision.

== Mixed martial arts career ==
=== Early career ===
Riddell made his MMA debut in an unexpected manner, having flown into Myanmar for a Muay Thai fight, but being told upon landing that it was a MMA fight. Then during his Muay Thai/Kickboxing career, he would continue to have MMA fights, mainly in the Glory of Heroes promotion, with his most notable win being a knockout of future fellow UFC fighter Kenan Song.

=== Ultimate Fighting Championship ===
Brad made his UFC career debut against fellow newcomer, Jamie Mullarkey at UFC 243 on 5 October 2019. In a fast-paced fight, Riddell won the fight via unanimous decision and took home the Fight of the Night bonus.

Brad faced Magomed Mustafaev on 23 February 2020 at UFC Fight Night: Felder vs. Hooker. He won the fight via split decision.

Riddell faced Alex da Silva Coelho at UFC 253 on 27 September 2020. He won the fight via unanimous decision.

Riddell was expected to face Gregor Gillespie on 20 March 2021 at UFC on ESPN 21. However, the day of the event the bout was postponed due to COVID-19 protocols.

Riddell faced Drew Dober on 12 June 2021 at UFC 263. He won the fight via unanimous decision. This fight earned him the Fight of the Night award.

Riddell faced Rafael Fiziev on 4 December 2021 at UFC on ESPN 31. He lost the fight via knockout in round three.

Riddell faced Jalin Turner on 2 July 2022, at UFC 276. He lost the bout via guillotine choke 45 seconds into the contest.

Riddell faced Renato Moicano on 12 November 2022 at UFC 281. He lost the bout via a rear naked choke in the first round. After the loss, Riddell announced that he would be taking a hiatus from MMA.

Upon his return to fighting, Riddell was expected to face Thiago Moisés on 16 March 2024, at UFC Fight Night 239. On 14 February 2024 though, it was announced that he withdrew from the event due to undisclosed reasons.

On 18 May 2026, it was reported that Riddell was removed from the UFC roster.

== Championships and achievements ==
=== Mixed martial arts ===
- Ultimate Fighting Championship
  - Fight of the Night (Two times) vs. Jamie Mullarkey and Drew Dober
- Wollongong Wars
  - Wollongong Wars Welterweight Championship (One time)

== Personal life ==
Riddell dubbed himself “Quake” in homage to his home city of Christchurch, which was devastated by an earthquake in 2011. The disaster destroyed many of the buildings, including Riddell's place of work, but it was also the catalyst for him moving to Auckland and building a career in combat sports.

In the UFC 322 Countdown, Riddell was credited as Zhang Weili's striking coach in her training for her fight versus Valentina Shevchenko.

== Mixed martial arts record ==
Professional record breakdown
14 matches	10 wins	4 losses
By knockout	5	1
By submission	0	3
By decision	5	0

Res.	Record	Opponent	Method	Event	Date	Round	Time	Location	Notes
Loss	10–4	Renato Moicano	Submission (rear-naked choke)	UFC 281	13 November 2022	1	3:20	New York City, New York, United States	
Loss	10–3	Jalin Turner	Submission (guillotine choke)	UFC 276	2 July 2022	1	0:45	Las Vegas, Nevada, United States	
Loss	10–2	Rafael Fiziev	KO (spinning wheel kick)	UFC on ESPN: Font vs. Aldo	4 December 2021	3	2:20	Las Vegas, Nevada, United States	
Win	10–1	Drew Dober	Decision (unanimous)	UFC 263	12 June 2021	3	5:00	Glendale, Arizona, United States	Fight of the Night.
Win	9–1	Alex da Silva Coelho	Decision (unanimous)	UFC 253	27 September 2020	3	5:00	Abu Dhabi, United Arab Emirates	
Win	8–1	Magomed Mustafaev	Decision (split)	UFC Fight Night: Felder vs. Hooker	23 February 2020	3	5:00	Auckland, New Zealand	
Win	7–1	Jamie Mullarkey	Decision (unanimous)	UFC 243	5 October 2019	3	5:00	Melbourne, Australia	Return to Lightweight. Fight of the Night.
Win	6–1	Mikey Vaotuua	Decision (unanimous)	Wollongong Wars 7	12 July 2019	3	5:00	Gwynneville, Australia	Won the Wollongong Wars Welterweight Championship.
Win	5–1	Maxim Pugachev	TKO (punches)	Glory of Heroes 38	25 May 2019	1	5:00	Shantou, China	
Win	4–1	Shem Murdoch	TKO (punches)	Glory of Heroes 37	16 April 2019	1	3:42	Auckland, New Zealand	
Loss	3–1	Abel Brites	Submission (armbar)	Hex Fight Series 15	21 July 2018	1	1:05	Perth, Australia	Lightweight debut.
Win	3–0	Song Kenan	TKO (punch to the body)	Glory of Heroes 6	13 January 2017	2	3:11	Jiyuan, China	
Win	2–0	Erruer Ye	TKO (punches)	Glory of Heroes: Conquest of Heroes 2	3 December 2016	2	N/A	Jiyuan, China	
Win	1–0	Gi Gean Key	KO (punch)	International Boxing	31 August 2013	1	2:15	Yangon, Myanmar	Welterweight debut.

== Kickboxing and Muay Thai record ==
Kickboxing record (Incomplete)
60 Wins, 10 Losses, 0 Draws
Date	Result	Opponent	Event	Location	Method	Round	Time
2019-01-12	Loss	(Thailand) Rungrawee KemMuaythaigym	EM Legend 36	Shenzhen, China	Decision	3	3:00
2018-07-28	Win	(Thailand) Rungrawee KemMuaythaigym	EM Legend 32	Chengdu, China	Decision	3	3:00
2018-04-20	Loss	(Suriname) Regian Eersel	ONE Championship: Heroes of Honor	Manila, Philippines	Decision (Unanimous)	3	3:00
Record documented before the fight 59-8.
2018-03-02	Win	(Netherlands) Fernando Groenhart	Powerplay 36	Victoria, Australia	Decision (Unanimous)	5	3:00
2017-11-11	Loss	(Spain) Felix Carpintero	Glory of Heroes: China VS Spain	Madrid, Spain	Decision (Unanimous)	3	3:00
2017-05-27	Loss	(Portugal) Diogo Calado	Glory of Heroes: Portugal & Strikers League	Carcavelos, Portugal	Decision (Unanimous)	3	3:00
For the Strikers League 77 kg title.
2017-04-01	Win	(Thailand) Janrob Strong Heart	Powerplay 33	Victoria, Australia	Decision (Unanimous)	5	3:00
2016-11	Win	(China) Zhang Lipeng	Wu Lin Feng	China			
2016-10-14	Win	(Australia) Frank Giorgi	Powerplay Promotions 31	Australia	Decision (Split)	5	3:00
2016-09-24	Win	(China) Zheng Zhaoyu	Kunlun Fight 53	Beijing, China	Ext.R Decision (Unanimous)	4	3:00
2016-05-07	Loss	(France) Cedric Doumbe	Glory of Heroes 2	Shenzhen, China	Decision (Split)	3	3:00
2016-03-04	Win	(Australia) John Wayne Parr	Boonchu Cup: Caged Muay Thai 8	Gold Coast, Australia	Decision (unanimous)	5	3:00
2016	Win	(China) Geng Shuguang	EM Legend	China	Decision (Unanimous)	3	3:00
2015-08-29	Win	(Australia) Michael Badato	King in the Ring 100+ kg III	Auckland, New Zealand	Decision (Unanimous)	3	3:00
2015-04-17	Win	(Australia) Maseh Nuristani	GFC Fight Series 5	Dubai, United Arab Emirates	TKO	1	
2014-04-26	Loss	(Australia) Steve Moxon	Kings of Kombat 12	Dandenong, Australia	Decision (unanimous)	5	3:00
2013-11-08	Loss	(Australia) John Wayne Parr	Powerplay Promotions 22	Melbourne, Australia	Decision (unanimous)	5	3:00
2012-06-24	Loss	(China) Yi Long	Wu Lin Feng	Henan, China	Decision	3	3:00
For the CIK World Champion.
2012-01-14	Loss	(China) Yi Long	Wu Lin Feng	Henan, China	Decision	3	3:00
2011-12-02	Win	(China) Yi Long	Wu Lin Feng	Henan, China	Decision	3	3:00
2011-10-28	Loss	(New Zealand) Edwin Samy	King in the Ring 72 kg I, Semi-finals	Auckland, New Zealand			
2011-10-28	Win	(New Zealand) Brendan Varty	King in the Ring 72 kg I, Quarter-finals	Auckland, New Zealand			
2011-03-12	Win	(New Zealand)		Nelson, New Zealand	TKO (Knee)		
Wins the WKBF New Zealand Middleweight title.
2010-09-17	Win	(Thailand)	Bangla Boxing Stadium	Thailand	KO (Straight Right)	1	
2010-03-13	Win	(New Zealand) Jason Nuttal	Fight Sports Night 2	Christchurch, New Zealand	TKO (Punches)	2	
2009-12-03	Win	(New Zealand) Leon Tangaroa	Cage Warriors 3	New Zealand	Decision (Unanimous)	3	3:00
Legend: Win Loss Draw/No contest Notes

== Boxing record ==
Boxing record
Date	Result	Opponent	Location	Method	Round	Record
3 November 2015	Loss	(New Zealand) Reece Papuni	(New Zealand) Sky City Convention Centre Auckland	UD	3 (3)	0–1
Legend: Win Loss Draw/No contest Notes

== See also ==
- List of male mixed martial artists
