= UFC Fight Night: Felder vs. Hooker =

UFC mixed martial arts event in 2020

- The poster for UFC Fight Night: Felder vs. Hooker
- Promotion: Ultimate Fighting Championship
- Date: 23 February 2020
- Venue: Spark Arena
- City: Auckland, New Zealand
- Attendance: 10,025
- Total gate: $1,239,625

Event chronology
UFC Fight Night: Anderson vs. Błachowicz 2	UFC Fight Night: Felder vs. Hooker	UFC Fight Night: Benavidez vs. Figueiredo

UFC Fight Night: Felder vs. Hooker (also known as UFC Fight Night 168 and UFC on ESPN+ 26) was a mixed martial arts event produced by the Ultimate Fighting Championship that took place on 23 February 2020, at Spark Arena in Auckland, New Zealand.

== Background ==
The event was the third time that the promotion has hosted in Auckland and first since UFC Fight Night: Lewis vs. Hunt in June 2017.

A lightweight bout between Paul Felder and Dan Hooker served as the event headliner.

A light heavyweight bout between Tyson Pedro and Vinicius Moreira was scheduled for the event. However, Pedro pulled out of the fight in early January citing an undisclosed injury. In turn, promotion officials elected to remove Moreira from the card entirely.

A women's flyweight bout between Rachael Ostovich and Shana Dobson was scheduled for the event. However, Ostovich pulled out of the fight for an unknown reason and was replaced by Priscila Cachoeira.

A women's strawweight bout between Loma Lookboonmee and Hannah Goldy was scheduled for the event. However, Goldy pulled out due to a shoulder injury and was replaced by former Invicta FC Strawweight Champion Angela Hill.

A lightweight bout between Jamie Mullarkey and Jalin Turner was scheduled for the event. However, Mullarkey withdrew from the event due to injury and was replaced by promotional newcomer Joshua Culibao.

A welterweight bout between Maki Pitolo and Takashi Sato was scheduled for the preliminary portion of the card. However, the bout was cancelled as Pitolo failed to make it to the scale during the weigh-ins after falling ill and the matchup was called off by medical personnel.

== Results ==
Main card (ESPN+)
Weight class				Method	Round	Time	Notes
Lightweight	Dan Hooker	def.	Paul Felder	Decision (split) (47–48, 48–47, 48–47)	5	5:00
Light Heavyweight	Jimmy Crute	def.	Michał Oleksiejczuk	Submission (kimura)	1	3:29
Women's Strawweight	Yan Xiaonan	def.	Karolina Kowalkiewicz	Decision (unanimous) (30–26, 30–26, 30–26)	3	5:00
Heavyweight	Marcos Rogério de Lima	def.	Ben Sosoli	TKO (punches)	1	1:28
Lightweight	Brad Riddell	def.	Magomed Mustafaev	Decision (split) (29–28, 28–29, 29–28)	3	5:00
Preliminary card (ESPN+)
Featherweight	Zubaira Tukhugov	def.	Kevin Aguilar	TKO (punches)	1	3:21
Lightweight	Jalin Turner	def.	Joshua Culibao	TKO (punches)	2	3:01
Welterweight	Jake Matthews	def.	Emil Weber Meek	Decision (unanimous) (29–28, 29–28, 29–28)	3	5:00
Welterweight	Song Kenan	def.	Callan Potter	KO (punches)	1	2:20
Flyweight	Kai Kara-France	def.	Tyson Nam	Decision (unanimous) (30–27, 30–27, 30–27)	3	5:00
Women's Strawweight	Angela Hill	def.	Loma Lookboonmee	Decision (unanimous) (30–27, 29–28, 29–28)	3	5:00
Women's Flyweight	Priscila Cachoeira	def.	Shana Dobson	KO (punch)	1	0:40

== Bonus awards ==
The following fighters received $50,000 bonuses.

- Fight of the Night: Dan Hooker vs. Paul Felder
- Performance of the Night: Jimmy Crute and Priscila Cachoeira

== See also ==
- List of UFC events
- List of current UFC fighters
- 2020 in UFC
