= Zubaira Tukhugov =

Russian mixed martial arts fighter

- Born: January 15, 1991 (age 35); Grozny, Checheno-Ingush ASSR, Russian SFSR, Soviet Union
- Native name: Зубайра Тухугов
- Other names: Zuba; Warrior
- Nationality: Russian
- Height: 5 ft 8 in (173 cm)
- Weight: 158 lb (72 kg; 11 st 4 lb)
- Division: Featherweight (2013–2022); Lightweight (2010–2013, 2022–present)
- Reach: 72 1/2 in (184 cm)
- Stance: Orthodox
- Fighting out of: Grozny, Chechnya; Moscow, Russia
- Team: American Kickboxing Academy (2016-current); Krepyost; Berkut Fight Club
- Rank: Master of Sports in Combat Sambo; Master of Sports in Hand-to-Hand Combat
- Years active: 2010–present

Mixed martial arts record
- Total: 27
- Wins: 20
- By knockout: 7
- By submission: 1
- By decision: 12
- Losses: 6
- By knockout: 1
- By submission: 1
- By decision: 4
- Draws: 1

Other information
- Mixed martial arts record from Sherdog

Zubaira Alikhanovich Tukhugov (Note: Russian:Зуба́йра Алиха́нович Туху́гов) (born January 15, 1991) is a Russian mixed martial artist who competed in the Lightweight division of the Ultimate Fighting Championship (UFC). A professional MMA competitor since 2010, Tukhugov fought in promotions like Cage Warriors, ProFC, Fight Nights (EFN) and others, before joining the UFC in 2014. He has also competed in the Professional Fighters League, and was involved in the UFC 229 Nurmagomedov-McGregor post-fight incident.

== Mixed martial arts career ==
Tukhugov made his professional debut in 2010 beating his three opponents by winning Pankration Atrium Cup 2 eight man, one night tournament. After a 10-3 mixed martial arts records, he would be signed by the Russian promotion, Fight Nights, where he won all of his 3 fights, defeating Romano De Los Reyes, Harun Kina and Vaso Bakocevic. During his time on Fight Nights, Tukhugov did a fight for Cage Warriors, defeating Denys Pidnebesnyi at CWFC 58.

=== Ultimate Fighting Championship ===
In December 2013, it was announced that Tukhugov had signed a contract with UFC and was scheduled to make his promotional debut against Thiago Tavares on February 15 at UFC Fight Night: Machida vs. Mousasi. However, Tavares was forced to pull out due to an undisclosed injury, and was replaced by UFC newcomer Douglas Silva de Andrade. Tukhugov dominated the fight and got a unanimous decision win.

Tukhugov later faced Ernest Chavez on October 4, at UFC Fight Night: Nelson vs. Story. He won the fight via technical knockout due to punches in the first round.

Tukhugov was expected to face Thiago Tavares on June 6, 2015 at UFC Fight Night 68 However, the pairing was scrapped after Tukhugov suffered a rib injury.

Tukhugov faced Phillipe Nover on December 10, 2015 at UFC Fight Night 80. He won the fight by split decision.

Tukhugov next faced Renato Moicano on May 14, 2016 at UFC 198. In a controversial series of events, despite Tukhogov suffering a kick to the groin in the first round and again in the second round, referee Eduardo Herdy signaled the competitors to continue. Tukhogov lost the fight via split decision.

Tukhugov was expected to face Tiago Trator on December 9, 2016 at UFC Fight Night 102. However, on November 14, Tukhugov was pulled from the card after being notified by USADA of a potential anti-doping violation stemming from an out-of-competition sample collected earlier. In February 2018, it was announced that Tukhugov received a two years USADA suspension and contributed USD ten thousand dollar for the arbitration proceedings in testing positive for ostarine from a sample collected on October 29, 2016.

Tukhugov was scheduled to face Artem Lobov on October 27, 2018 at UFC Fight Night 138. However, it was reported that Tukhugov was removed from the fight due his role in the UFC 229 post-fight melee.

After a three-year lay-off, Tukhugov returned to face Lerone Murphy on September 7, 2019 at UFC 242. The back-and-forth fight ended in a split draw, with two judges awarding a 29-28 win to different fighters and the third seeing it as a 28-28 draw.

Tukhugov faced Kevin Aguilar on February 23, 2020 at UFC Fight Night 168. He won the fight via TKO in the first round.

Tukhugov faced Hakeem Dawodu on September 27, 2020 at UFC 253. At the weigh-ins, Tukhugov weighed in at 150 pounds, four pounds over the non-title featherweight fight limit. The bout proceeded at a catchweight and Tukhugov was fined a percentage of his purse, which went to his opponent Dawodu. Tukhugov lost the fight via split decision.

Tukhugov was scheduled to face Ricardo Ramos on March 13, 2021 at UFC Fight Night 187. A week before the event, Tukhugov pulled out due to undisclosed reasons. Promotion officials elected to remove Ramos from the card entirely. The Ramos bout was rescheduled for October 30, 2021 at UFC 267. He won the bout via unanimous decision.

Tukhugov was scheduled to face Nate Landwehr on August 6, 2022 at UFC on ESPN 40, However, Tukhugov pulled out of the fight due to alleged visa issues which restricted his travel.

Tukhugov was scheduled to face Lucas Almeida on October 22, 2022 at UFC 280. The bout was canceled just minutes before weigh-ins, due to weight management issues.

Tukhugov was scheduled to face Joel Álvarez on February 14, 2023 at UFC 284. However, Alvarez withrew from the event for undisclosed reasons and he was replaced by promotional newcomer Elves Brenner. At the weigh-ins, Tukhugov weighed in at 157.5 pounds, one and a half pound over the lightweight non-title fight limit. The bout proceeded at catchweight and Tukhugov was fined 30% of his purse, which went to Brenner. He lost the fight via split decision.

On February 28, 2023 Tukhugov was released from the UFC roster.

=== Professional Fighters League ===
Tukhugov was scheduled to face Artem Lobov on October 3, 2025, at PFL Champions Series 3. However on September 30, the promotion announced that the bout was scrapped due to Lobov's suffered an injury in training.

== Controversies ==
=== UFC 229 Nurmagomedov-McGregor post-fight incident ===
At UFC 229, Khabib Nurmagomedov jumped the cage after his victory and charged toward Conor McGregor's team mate Dillon Danis. Soon after, McGregor and Khabib's cousin Abubakar Nurmagomedov attempted to exit the octagon, but a scuffle broke out between them after McGregor hit Abubakar, who then punched him back. Tukhugov jumped the cage and punched McGregor before security pulled him and Asadulla Emiragaev away. On January 29, 2019, the NSAC announced a one-year suspension for Tukhugov, (retroactive to October 6, 2018) and a $25,000 fine. On May 22, 2019, NSAC reduced the suspensions by 35 days which allowed Tukhugov to be eligible to compete again on September 1, 2019.

== Mixed martial arts record ==
Professional record breakdown
27 matches	20 wins	6 losses
By knockout	7	1
By submission	1	1
By decision	12	4
Draws	1	

Res.	Record	Opponent	Method	Event	Date	Round	Time	Location	Notes
Loss	20–6–1	Elves Brener	Decision (split)	UFC 284	February 12, 2023	3	5:00	Perth, Australia	Return to Lightweight; Tukhugov missed weight (157.5 lb).
Win	20–5–1	Ricardo Ramos	Decision (unanimous)	UFC 267	October 30, 2021	3	5:00	Abu Dhabi, United Arab Emirates	
Loss	19–5–1	Hakeem Dawodu	Decision (split)	UFC 253	September 27, 2020	3	5:00	Abu Dhabi, United Arab Emirates	Catchweight (150 lb) bout; Tukhugov missed weight.
Win	19–4–1	Kevin Aguilar	TKO (punches)	UFC Fight Night: Felder vs. Hooker	February 23, 2020	1	3:21	Auckland, New Zealand	
Draw	18–4–1	Lerone Murphy	Draw (split)	UFC 242	September 7, 2019	3	5:00	Abu Dhabi, United Arab Emirates	
Loss	18–4	Renato Moicano	Decision (split)	UFC 198	May 14, 2016	3	5:00	Curitiba, Brazil	
Win	18–3	Phillipe Nover	Decision (split)	UFC Fight Night: Namajunas vs. VanZant	December 10, 2015	3	5:00	Las Vegas, Nevada, United States	
Win	17–3	Ernest Chavez	TKO (punches)	UFC Fight Night: Nelson vs. Story	October 4, 2014	1	4:21	Stockholm, Sweden	
Win	16–3	Douglas Silva de Andrade	Decision (unanimous)	UFC Fight Night: Machida vs. Mousasi	February 15, 2014	3	5:00	Jaraguá do Sul, Brazil	
Win	15–3	Vaso Bakočević	KO (spinning back kick)	Fight Nights: Battle of Moscow 13	October 26, 2013	1	4:30	Moscow, Russia	Featherweight debut. For the inaugural FNG Featherweight Championship. Both fighters missed weight (153.9 lb) and were ineligible to win the title.
Win	14–3	Denys Pidnebesnyi	Decision (unanimous)	Cage Warriors 58	August 24, 2013	3	5:00	Grozny, Russia	Catchweight (158 lb) bout.
Win	13–3	Kuat Khamitov	Decision (split)	Alash Pride FC: Great Battle	March 30, 2013	2	5:00	Almaty, Kazakhstan	
Win	12–3	Harun Kina	TKO (punches)	Fight Nights: Battle of Moscow 10	February 23, 2013	1	2:30	Moscow, Russia	Catchweight (156.5 lb) bout; Kina missed weight.
Win	11–3	Romano De Los Reyes	Decision (unanimous)	Fight Nights: Battle of Moscow 8	November 3, 2012	2	5:00	Moscow, Russia	
Win	10–3	Anatoliy Pokrovsky	Decision (unanimous)	League S-70: Plotforma Cup 2012	August 11, 2012	1	1:43	Sochi, Russia	
Loss	9–3	Akhmet Aliev	KO (head kick)	League S-70: 2011 Russian Grand Prix 4	May 25, 2012	1	3:19	Moscow, Russia	
Win	9–2	Ivan Lapin	Decision (split)	League S-70: 2011 Russian Grand Prix 3	April 6, 2012	3	5:00	Moscow, Russia	Return to Lightweight.
Win	8–2	Risim Mislimov	Decision (unanimous)	MMA Corona Cup 20	February 17, 2012	3	5:00	Moscow, Russia	Welterweight debut.
Loss	7–2	Anton Telepnev	Decision (split)	ProFC 22	December 17, 2010	3	5:00	Rostov-on-Don, Russia	
Win	7–1	Murad Abdulaev	TKO (doctor stoppage)	ProFC 19	November 13, 2010	1	5:00	Taganrog, Russia	Won the ProFC Russia Cup 1 Lightweight Tournament.
Win	6–1	Rasul Shovhalov	Decision (unanimous)	ProFC 19	November 13, 2010	2	5:00	Taganrog, Russia	ProFC Russia Cup 1 Lightweight Tournament Semifinal.
Loss	5–1	Murad Machaev	Submission (rear-naked choke)	Fight Nights: Battle of Moscow 1	June 5, 2010	1	1:17	Moscow, Russia	2010 Fight Nights Global Lightweight Tournament Final.
Win	5–0	Danil Turinghe	TKO (punches)	Fight Nights: Battle of Moscow 1	June 5, 2010	1	1:26	Moscow, Russia	2010 Fight Nights Global Lightweight Tournament Semifinal.
Win	4–0	Evgeniy Slonskiy	Decision (unanimous)	ProFC 15	April 23, 2010	2	5:00	Moscow, Russia	
Win	3–0	Viktor Finagin	Submission (rear-naked choke)	Atrium Pankration Cup 2010	March 10, 2010	2	N/A	Moscow, Russia	Won the 2010 Atrium Cup Lightweight Tournament.
Win	2–0	Roman Markovich	Decision (unanimous)	Atrium Pankration Cup 2010	March 10, 2010	3	5:00	Moscow, Russia	2010 Atrium Cup Lightweight Tournament Semifinal.
Win	1–0	Isa Musaev	Decision (unanimous)	Atrium Pankration Cup 2010	March 10, 2010	3	5:00	Moscow, Russia	Lightweight debut. 2010 Atrium Cup Lightweight Tournament Quarterfinal.

== See also ==
- List of male mixed martial artists
