= UFC 284 =

2023 mixed martial arts event

UFC 284: Makhachev vs. Volkanovski
- The poster for UFC 284: Makhachev vs. Volkanovski
- Promotion: Ultimate Fighting Championship
- Date: 12 February 2023
- Venue: RAC Arena
- City: Perth, Australia
- Attendance: 14,124
- Total gate: $4,086,687.70

Event chronology
UFC Fight Night: Lewis vs. Spivak	UFC 284: Makhachev vs. Volkanovski	UFC Fight Night: Andrade vs. Blanchfield

UFC 284: Makhachev vs. Volkanovski was a mixed martial arts event produced by the Ultimate Fighting Championship that took place on 12 February 2023, at RAC Arena in Perth, Australia.

== Background ==
The event marked the promotion's 16th overall trip to Australia, returning to the country for the first time since UFC 243 in Melbourne in October 2019.

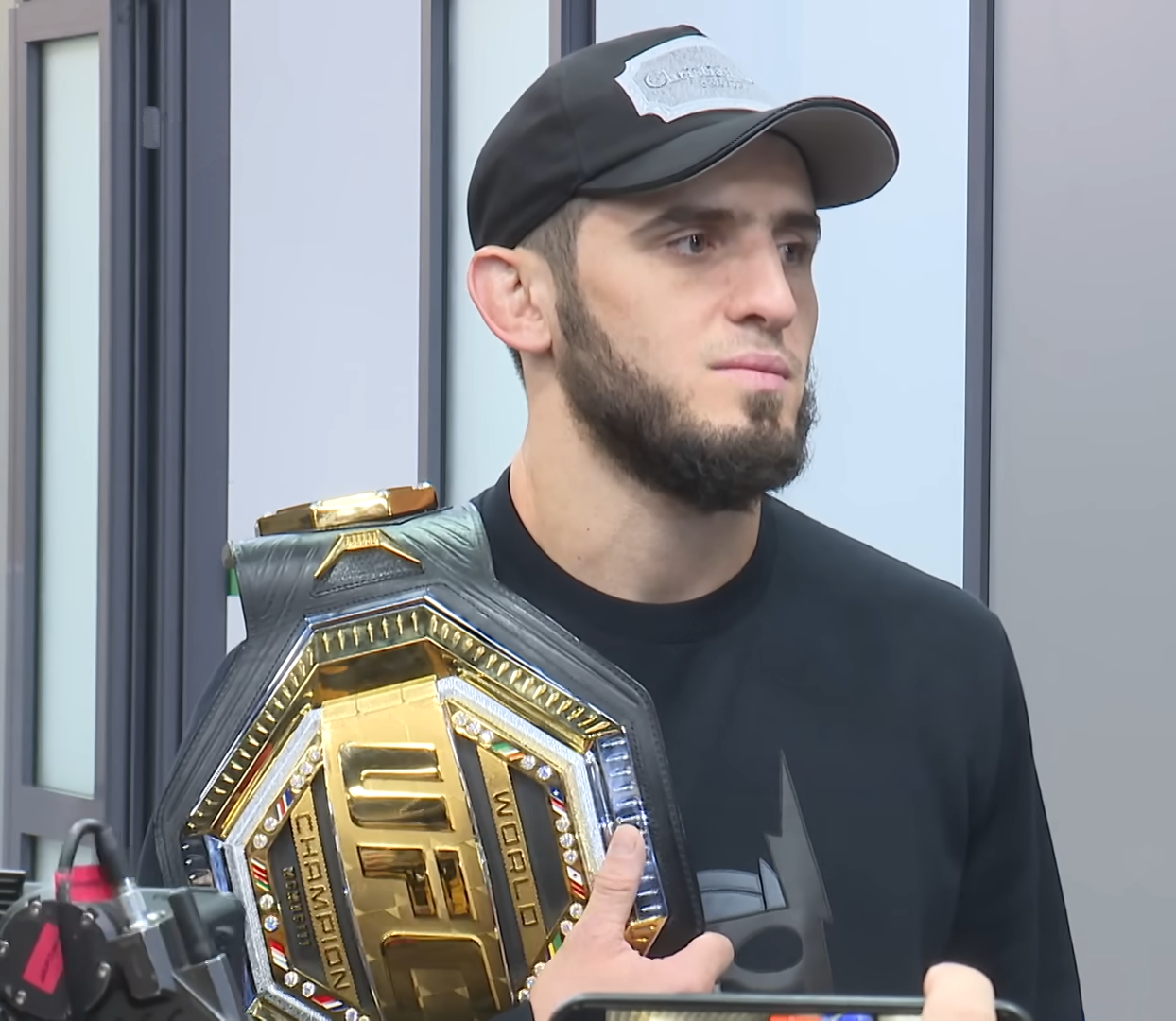
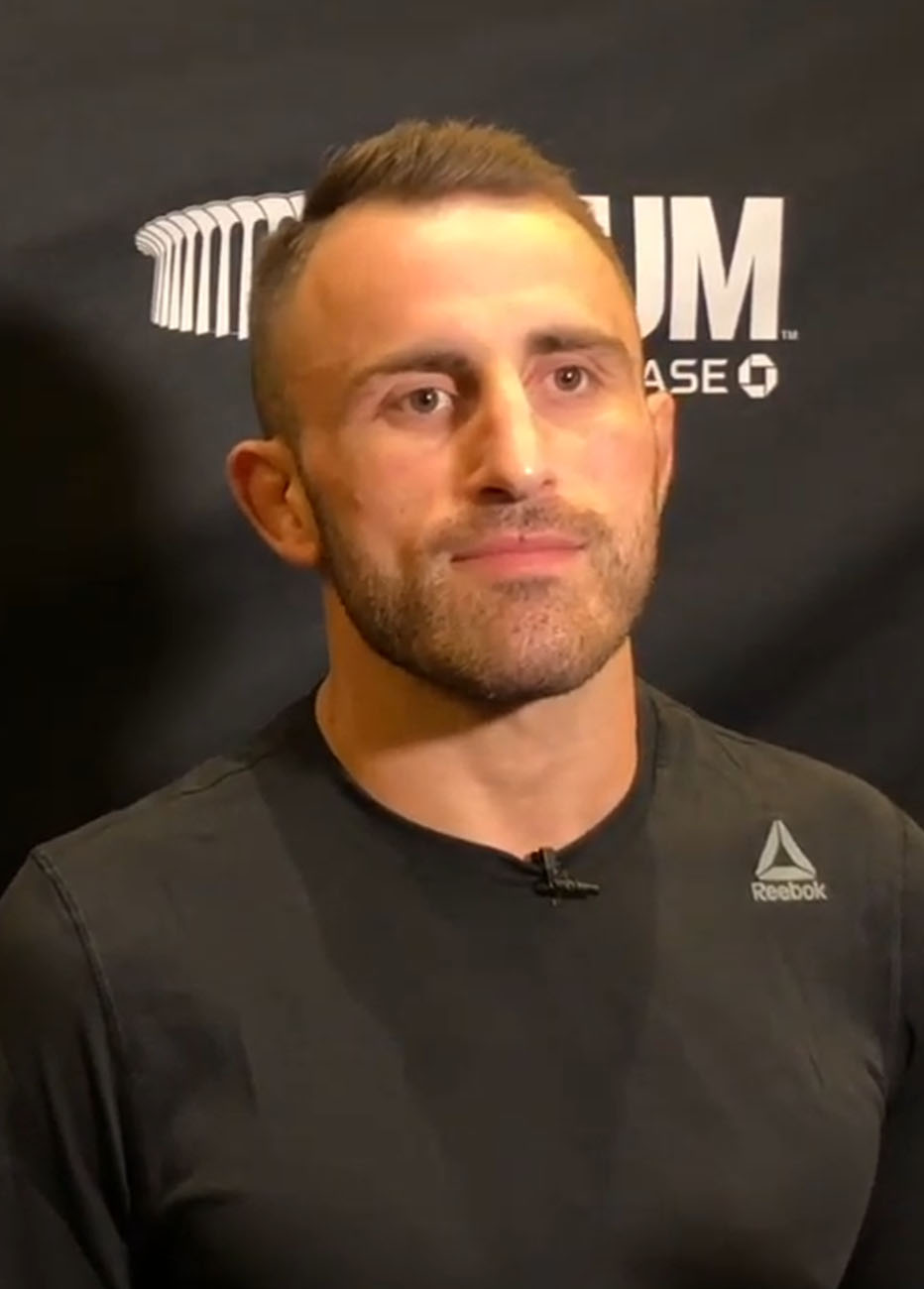
Makhachev (left) made his first title defense after winning the title at UFC 280. If victorious, Volkanovski (right) would have become the second man to be a simultaneous UFC featherweight and lightweight champion.

A UFC Lightweight Championship bout between current champion Islam Makhachev and current UFC Featherweight Champion Alexander Volkanovski headlined the event. This was the eighth time in UFC history that champions in different divisions fought for the same title, following UFC 94, UFC 205, UFC 226, UFC 232, UFC Fight Night: Cejudo vs. Dillashaw, UFC 259, and UFC 277. If successful, Volkanovski would have become the fourth man to be champion in two divisions simultaneously and fifth fighter overall (after Conor McGregor at UFC 205, Daniel Cormier at UFC 226, Amanda Nunes at UFC 232 and UFC 277, and Henry Cejudo at UFC 238), as well as the eighth person overall to win a title in different divisions. It was also the first time in the organization's history that the number 1 pound-for-pound fighter (Volkanovski) faced the number 2 fighter (Makhachev) for a championship.

An interim UFC Featherweight Championship bout between The Ultimate Fighter: Latin America featherweight winner Yair Rodríguez and Josh Emmett took place at the event.

A middleweight bout between former UFC Middleweight Champion (also The Ultimate Fighter: The Smashes welterweight winner) Robert Whittaker and former title challenger Paulo Costa was linked to this event. However, Costa disputed the official announcement by the promotion indicating he had never signed a contract and the fight would not take place. The pair was previously expected to headline UFC on ESPN: Whittaker vs. Gastelum in April 2021, but Costa withdrew due to illness.

A flyweight bout between former UFC Flyweight Championship challengers Alex Perez and Kai Kara-France (the latter for the interim title) was scheduled for this event. They were once booked for an event at San Diego on May 16, 2020, but the card was moved to a different location due to the COVID-19 pandemic and the bout eventually never took place. In turn, the bout was canceled in late December as Kara-France suffered an undisclosed injury. Perez was rescheduled for a bout against former Rizin Bantamweight Champion Manel Kape at UFC on ESPN: Vera vs. Sandhagen on March 25.

A women's strawweight bout between Loma Lookboonmee and Elise Reed was scheduled for UFC Fight Night: Lewis vs. Spivak. However, the pair was moved to this event for undisclosed reasons.

A lightweight bout between Nasrat Haqparast and Jamie Mullarkey was expected to take place at the event. However, Haqparast withdrew due to undisclosed reasons and was replaced by promotional newcomer Francisco Prado.

A lightweight bout between Joel Álvarez and Zubaira Tukhugov was scheduled for the event. However, Alvarez withrew from the event for undisclosed reasons and was replaced by promotional newcomer Elves Brenner. At the weigh-ins, Tukhugov weighed in at 157.5 pounds, one and a half pound over the lightweight non-title fight limit. The bout proceeded at catchweight and Tukhugov was fined 30% of his purse, which went to Brenner.

A heavyweight bout between promotional newcomer Junior Tafa and Austen Lane was scheduled for this event. However, Lane withdrew due to undisclosed reasons and was replaced by Waldo Cortes-Acosta. In turn, it was announced a few days later that Tafa withdrew due to injury and the bout was scrapped.

A light heavyweight bout between Tyson Pedro and Zhang Mingyang was expected to take place at the event. However, Zhang withdrew for unknown reasons and was replaced by Modestas Bukauskas.

Also at the weigh-ins, Kleydson Rodrigues missed weight. He weighed in at 127 pounds, one pound over the flyweight non-title fight limit. The bout proceeded at catchweight with Rodrigues being fined 20% of his purse, which went to his opponent Shannon Ross.

During the event's broadcast, the inaugural and former UFC Lightweight Champion Jens Pulver was announced as the next "pioneer wing" UFC Hall of Fame inductee.

== Results ==
Main card
Weight class				Method	Round	Time	Notes
Lightweight	Islam Makhachev (c)	def.	Alexander Volkanovski	Decision (unanimous) (48–47, 48–47, 49–46)	5	5:00	(Note: For the UFC Lightweight Championship.)
Featherweight	Yair Rodríguez	def.	Josh Emmett	Submission (triangle choke)	2	4:19	(Note: For the interim UFC Featherweight Championship.)
Welterweight	Jack Della Maddalena	def.	Randy Brown	Submission (rear-naked choke)	1	2:13
Heavyweight	Justin Tafa	def.	Parker Porter	KO (punch)	1	1:06
Light Heavyweight	Jimmy Crute	vs.	Alonzo Menifield	Draw (majority) (29–27, 28–28, 28–28)	3	5:00	(Note: Menifield was deducted 1 point in round 3 due to grabbing the fence.)
Preliminary card (ESPN / ESPN+)
Light Heavyweight	Modestas Bukauskas	def.	Tyson Pedro	Decision (unanimous) (30–27, 29–28, 29–28)	3	5:00
Featherweight	Joshua Culibao	def.	Melsik Baghdasaryan	Submission (rear-naked choke)	2	2:02
Catchweight (127 lb)	Kleydson Rodrigues	def.	Shannon Ross	TKO (punches)	1	0:59
Lightweight	Jamie Mullarkey	def.	Francisco Prado	Decision (unanimous) (30–27, 30–27, 30–27)	3	5:00
Early preliminary card (ESPN+ / UFC Fight Pass)
Featherweight	Jack Jenkins	def.	Don Shainis	Decision (unanimous) (30–27, 30–27, 29–28)	3	5:00
Women's Strawweight	Loma Lookboonmee	def.	Elise Reed	Submission (rear-naked choke)	2	0:44
Featherweight	Blake Bilder	def.	Shane Young	Decision (unanimous) (30–27, 30–27, 29–28)	3	5:00
Catchweight (157.5 lb)	Elves Brener	def.	Zubaira Tukhugov	Decision (split) (29–28, 28–29, 30–27)	3	5:00

== Bonus awards ==
The following fighters received $50,000 bonuses.

- Fight of the Night: Islam Makhachev vs. Alexander Volkanovski
- Performance of the Night: Yair Rodríguez and Jack Della Maddalena

== See also ==
- List of UFC events
- List of current UFC fighters
- Mixed Martial Arts in Australia
- 2023 in UFC
