= UFC Fight Night: Aspinall vs. Tybura =

Mixed martial arts event in 2023

- The poster for UFC Fight Night: Aspinall vs. Tybura
- Promotion: Ultimate Fighting Championship
- Date: July 22, 2023
- Venue: The O_{2} Arena
- City: London, England
- Attendance: 15,078
- Total gate: $2,500,000

Event chronology
UFC on ESPN: Holm vs. Bueno Silva	UFC Fight Night: Aspinall vs. Tybura	UFC 291: Poirier vs. Gaethje 2

UFC Fight Night: Aspinall vs. Tybura (also known as UFC Fight Night 224 and UFC on ESPN+ 82) was a mixed martial arts event produced by the Ultimate Fighting Championship that took place on July 22, 2023, at The O_{2} Arena in London, England.

== Background ==
The event marked the promotion's 15th visit to London and first since UFC 286 in March 2023.

A heavyweight bout between Tom Aspinall and Marcin Tybura headlined the event.

== Results ==
Main Card (ESPN+)
Weight class				Method	Round	Time	Notes
Heavyweight	Tom Aspinall	def.	Marcin Tybura	TKO (elbow and punches)	1	1:13
Women's Flyweight	Julija Stoliarenko	def.	Molly McCann	Submission (armbar)	1	1:55
Featherweight	Nathaniel Wood	def.	Andre Fili	Decision (unanimous) (29–28, 29–28, 29–28)	3	5:00
Middleweight	Paul Craig	def.	André Muniz	TKO (elbows)	2	4:40
Lightweight	Farès Ziam	def.	Jai Herbert	Decision (unanimous) (29–28, 29–28, 30–27)	3	5:00
Featherweight	Lerone Murphy	def.	Joshua Culibao	Decision (unanimous) (30–26, 30–26, 30–27)	3	5:00
Bantamweight	Daniel Marcos	def.	Davey Grant	Decision (split) (28–29, 29–28, 29–28)	3	5:00
Preliminary card (ESPN+ / UFC Fight Pass)
Welterweight	Jonny Parsons	def.	Danny Roberts	TKO (punches)	2	4:57
Lightweight	Joel Álvarez	def.	Marc Diakiese	Submission (brabo choke)	2	4:26
Heavyweight	Mick Parkin	def.	Jamal Pogues	Decision (unanimous) (30–27, 30–27, 30–27)	3	5:00
Middleweight	Makhmud Muradov	def.	Bryan Barberena	Decision (unanimous) (30–27, 30–27, 30–27)	3	5:00
Women's Bantamweight	Ketlen Vieira	def.	Pannie Kianzad	Decision (unanimous) (29–28, 29–28, 29–28)	3	5:00
Lightweight	Chris Duncan	def.	Yanal Ashmouz	Decision (unanimous) (30–27, 30–27, 29–28)	3	5:00
Women's Strawweight	Bruna Brasil	def.	Shauna Bannon	Decision (unanimous) (29–28, 29–28, 30–27)	3	5:00
Flyweight	Jafel Filho	def.	Daniel Bárez	Submission (arm-triangle choke)	1	3:26

== Bonus awards ==
The following fighters received $50,000 bonuses.

- Fight of the Night: Jonny Parsons vs. Danny Roberts
- Performance of the Night: Tom Aspinall and Paul Craig

== See also ==
- List of UFC events
- List of current UFC fighters
- 2023 in UFC
