= Renato Moicano =

Brazilian mixed martial artist (born 1989)

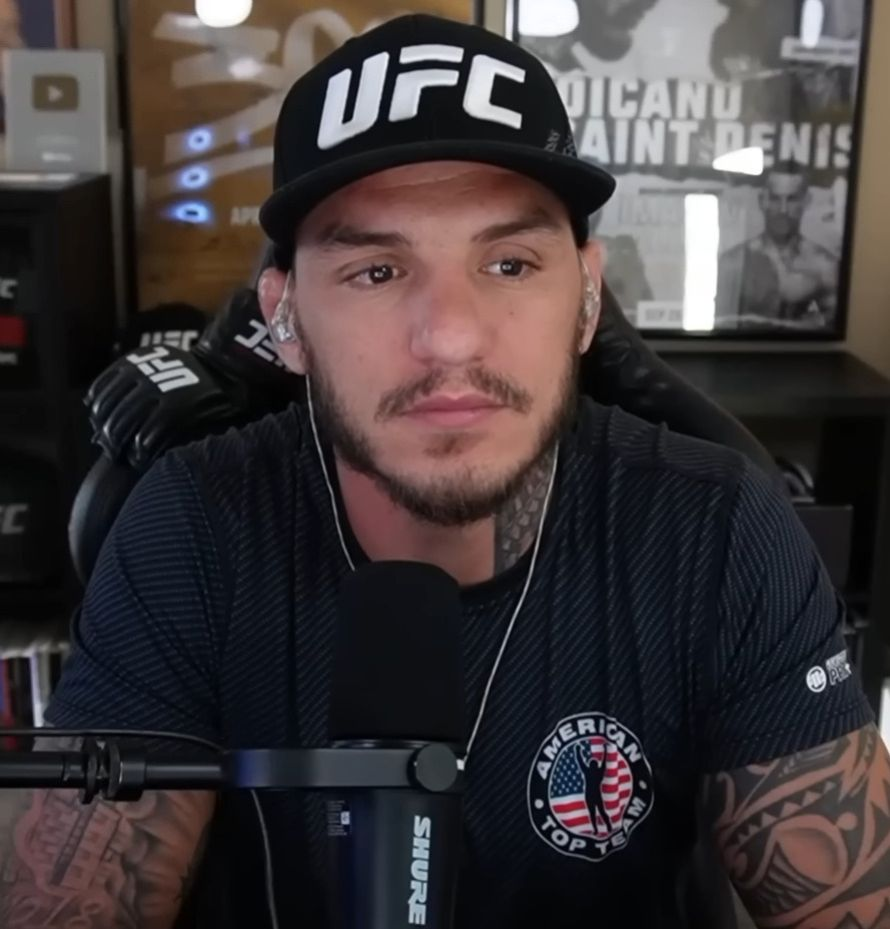
- Moicano in 2025
- Born: Renato Alves Carneiro; May 21, 1989 (age 37); Brasília, Distrito Federal, Brazil
- Nickname: Money Moicano
- Height: 5 ft 11 in (180 cm)
- Weight: 155 lb (70 kg; 11 st 1 lb)
- Division: Featherweight (2010–2019); Lightweight (2020–present)
- Reach: 72 in (183 cm)
- Style: Submission Grappling
- Fighting out of: Brasília, Brazil
- Team: Constrictor Team; American Top Team (2017–present)
- Rank: Black belt in Brazilian Jiu-Jitsu under Alex Leleco; Black belt in Muay Thai
- Years active: 2010–present

Mixed martial arts record
- Total: 30
- Wins: 21
- By knockout: 2
- By submission: 11
- By decision: 8
- Losses: 8
- By knockout: 4
- By submission: 2
- By decision: 2
- Draws: 1

Other information
- Website: moneymoicano.com
- Mixed martial arts record from Sherdog

YouTube information
- Channel: Renato Money Moicano
- Subscribers: 240 thousand
- Views: 21 million
- Last updated: December 30, 2025

Renato Alves Carneiro (born May 21, 1989), known as Renato Moicano, is a Brazilian professional mixed martial artist. He currently competes in the Lightweight division of the Ultimate Fighting Championship (UFC). A professional since 2010, Moicano made a name for himself fighting all over his home country of Brazil, and is the former interim Jungle Fight Featherweight Champion. As of October 31, 2026, he is #14 in the Meta UFC lightweight rankings.

Moicano is known for his outspoken libertarian activism, inspired by taxes on his UFC winnings, promoting Austrian economics, Bitcoin as protection against financial instability, and core U.S. constitutional liberties.

== Background ==
Born in Brazil, Carneiro started training judo at the age of eight. He attended university in order to become a lawyer, but dropped out after two years to pursue a career in mixed martial arts.

In an interview, Moicano stated that his nickname "Moicano" means mohawk in Portuguese and that the nickname was given to him when he had a mohawk while training in Brazilian jiu-jitsu.

== Mixed martial arts career ==
After an undefeated professional record in eight fights, Moicano faced Ismael Bonfim for the interim Jungle Fight Featherweight Championship. He won the fight via rear naked choke submission in the first round.

=== Ultimate Fighting Championship ===
On December 12, 2014, it was announced that Moicano signed with the UFC, and was scheduled to replace Rony Jason against Tom Niinimäki on 10 days notice at UFC Fight Night 58. He won the fight via rear naked choke submission in the second round.

Moicano later was scheduled to fight Mirsad Bektic on May 30, 2015, at UFC Fight Night 67, but he was pulled from the bout due to injury and replaced by Lucas Martins.

On March 14, 2016, it was announced that Moicano would face Zubaira Tukhugov at UFC 198. for his second UFC appearance. He was the underdog to the fight but won via split decision.

Moicano was expected to face Mike De La Torre on September 24, 2016, at UFC Fight Night 95, but was forced to pull out with injury and was replaced on short notice by Godofredo Pepey.

For his third fight, Moicano faced Jeremy Stephens on April 15, 2017, at UFC on Fox 24. He won the fight by split decision.

Moicano faced Brian Ortega on July 29, 2017, at UFC 214. He lost the fight via guillotine choke submission in the third round. This fight earned Fight of the Night bonus. After the fight with Ortega, Moicano moved from Brazil to United States in order to train at the American Top Team.

Moicano faced Calvin Kattar on April 7, 2018, at UFC 223. He won the fight by unanimous decision.

Moicano faced Cub Swanson on August 4, 2018, at UFC 227. He won the fight via a rear naked choke submission. This win earned him the Performance of the Night award.

Moicano was scheduled to face Mirsad Bektic on December 8, 2018, at UFC 231; however, it was reported on 15 November 2018 that Bektic was forced to pull out of the bout due to an undisclosed injury and the bout was cancelled.

Moicano faced José Aldo on February 2, 2019, in the co-main event at UFC Fight Night 144. He lost the fight via TKO in the second round.

Moicano faced Chan Sung Jung on June 22, 2019, in the main event at UFC Fight Night 154. He lost the fight via TKO in the first round.

Moicano faced Damir Hadžović in a lightweight bout on March 14, 2020, at UFC Fight Night 170. He won the fight via a rear naked choke submission in round one.

Moicano was scheduled to face Magomed Mustafaev on October 18, 2020 at UFC Fight Night 180. However, Moicano pulled out of the fight in mid-September for undisclosed reasons. Two weeks later, it was reported that Moicano was scheduled to face Rafael Fiziev on November 28, 2020, at UFC on ESPN 18. In turn, Moicano pulled out on November 28 after testing positive for COVID-19 and the bout was rescheduled for UFC 256. He lost the fight via TKO in the first round.

Moicano faced Jai Herbert on June 26, 2021, at UFC Fight Night 190. He won the fight via a rear naked choke in round two.

Moicano faced Alexander Hernandez on February 12, 2022, at UFC 271. He won the bout via rear naked choke in the second round.

Moicano was tabbed as a short notice replacement for Rafael Fiziev and faced Rafael dos Anjos on March 5, 2022, at UFC 272. The bout was contested at a catchweight of 160 pounds. He lost the fight via unanimous decision.

Moicano faced Brad Riddell on November 12, 2022, at UFC 281. He won the bout via a rear naked choke in the first round.

Moicano was scheduled to face Arman Tsarukyan on April 29, 2023, at UFC on ESPN 45. However, Moicano withdrew due to an injury.

Moicano faced Drew Dober on February 3, 2024, at UFC Fight Night 235. Despite having his face cut open in the second round, Moicano had a significant amount of top-position control time which helped him win the bout by unanimous decision.

Moicano faced Jalin Turner on April 13, 2024, at UFC 300. After being knocked down at the end of the first round, Moicano rallied back and won the bout by technical knockout as a result of ground-and-pound.

Moicano faced Benoît Saint Denis in the main event on September 28, 2024 at UFC Fight Night 243. He won the fight by technical knockout due to doctor stoppage at the end of the second round as a result of damage done to Saint Denis' right eye.

Moicano was originally scheduled to face Beneil Dariush on January 18, 2025 at UFC 311. A day before the event, an injury suffered by title challenger Arman Tsarukyan forced him to pull out of the fight. Moicano ended up replacing Tsarukyan and challenged Lightweight Champion Islam Makhachev for the title. He lost the fight via a D'arce choke submission in the first round.

Moicano's bout with Dariush was re-scheduled and took place on June 28, 2025 at UFC 317. He lost the fight by unanimous decision.

Moicano was scheduled to face former UFC Featherweight Championship challenger Brian Ortega in a rematch on March 7, 2026 at UFC 326. However, Ortega withdrew due to injury, and the bout was scrapped.

Moicano faced Chris Duncan on April 4, 2026 in the main event at UFC Fight Night 272. He won the fight via a face crank submission in the second round.

Moicano was scheduled to face Brian Ortega on September 19, 2026 at UFC 331. However, days before the event, Ortega had to withdraw due to an eye injury, so the bout was once again cancelled.

Moicano faced Tom Nolan on October 31, 2026 at UFC Fight Night 292 in the main event. He lost the fight by technical knockout in the third round following a controversial referee stand up.

== Professional grappling career ==
Moicano defeated Chase Hooper via unanimous decision at Fury Pro Grappling 3 on December 30, 2021.

Moicano faced Cristian Guzman in the co-main event of UFC Fight Pass Invitational 7 on May 15, 2024. He won the match on points.

== Personal life ==
Moicano and his wife have a son. Moicano started referring to himself as "Money" in November 2022 after his UFC 281 post-fight speech.

Moicano has attracted attention for his outspoken support of Austrian economics. In 2024 his UFC shoutout of Ludwig von Mises became a viral video. He has said that taxes on his UFC winnings led to his economic study and activism. Moicano postulated his love and commitment to the libertarian values of the foundations of the United States, such as the Constitution, its First Amendment, freedom to bear arms and the right to private property. (Note: Strictly speaking, these were originally classical liberal values.) His advocacy for Bitcoin was highlighted by Fox Business in 2024, where Moicano framed cryptocurrency as a safeguard against financial instability. Later in 2024, he spoke negatively about French president Emmanuel Macron, globalists, and democracy in a victory speech in Paris; advising the audience to read the libertarian book Democracy: The God That Failed by Hans-Hermann Hoppe.

== Championships and achievements ==
=== Mixed martial arts ===
- Ultimate Fighting Championship
  - Fight of the Night (One time) vs. Brian Ortega
  - Performance of the Night (One time) vs. Cub Swanson
  - Tied (Kenny Florian and Brendan Allen) for third most rear-naked choke submissions in UFC history (7) (Note: The UFC statistically counts face crank submissions as rear-naked chokes.)
  - UFC Honors Awards
    - 2024: Fan's Choice Comeback of the Year Winner vs. Jalin Turner
  - UFC.com Awards
    - 2024: Ranked #7 Fighter of the Year
- Jungle Fight
  - Interim Jungle Fight Featherweight Championship (One time)
- ESPN
  - 2022 Best On-The-Mic moment of the Year at UFC 281
- MMA Fighting
  - 2024 First Team MMA All-Star

== Mixed martial arts record ==
Professional record breakdown
30 matches	21 wins	8 losses
By knockout	2	4
By submission	11	2
By decision	8	2
Draws	1	

Res.	Record	Opponent	Method	Event	Date	Round	Time	Location	Notes
Loss	21–8–1	Tom Nolan	TKO (punches and elbows)	UFC Fight Night: Moicano vs. Nolan	October 31, 2026	3	1:28	Las Vegas, Nevada, United States	
Win	21–7–1	Chris Duncan	Submission (face crank)	UFC Fight Night: Moicano vs. Duncan	April 4, 2026	2	3:14	Las Vegas, Nevada, United States	
Loss	20–7–1	Beneil Dariush	Decision (unanimous)	UFC 317	June 28, 2025	3	5:00	Las Vegas, Nevada, United States	
Loss	20–6–1	Islam Makhachev	Submission (brabo choke)	UFC 311	January 18, 2025	1	4:05	Inglewood, California, United States	For the UFC Lightweight Championship.
Win	20–5–1	Benoît Saint Denis	TKO (doctor stoppage)	UFC Fight Night: Moicano vs. Saint Denis	September 28, 2024	2	5:00	Paris, France	
Win	19–5–1	Jalin Turner	TKO (elbows and punches)	UFC 300	April 13, 2024	2	4:11	Las Vegas, Nevada, United States	
Win	18–5–1	Drew Dober	Decision (unanimous)	UFC Fight Night: Dolidze vs. Imavov	February 3, 2024	3	5:00	Las Vegas, Nevada, United States	
Win	17–5–1	Brad Riddell	Submission (rear-naked choke)	UFC 281	November 13, 2022	1	3:20	New York City, New York, United States	
Loss	16–5–1	Rafael dos Anjos	Decision (unanimous)	UFC 272	March 5, 2022	5	5:00	Las Vegas, Nevada, United States	Catchweight (160 lb) bout.
Win	16–4–1	Alexander Hernandez	Submission (rear-naked choke)	UFC 271	February 12, 2022	2	1:23	Houston, Texas, United States	
Win	15–4–1	Jai Herbert	Submission (rear-naked choke)	UFC Fight Night: Gane vs. Volkov	June 26, 2021	2	4:36	Las Vegas, Nevada, United States	
Loss	14–4–1	Rafael Fiziev	KO (punches)	UFC 256	December 12, 2020	1	4:05	Las Vegas, Nevada, United States	
Win	14–3–1	Damir Hadžović	Submission (rear-naked choke)	UFC Fight Night: Lee vs. Oliveira	March 14, 2020	1	0:44	Brasília, Brazil	Lightweight debut.
Loss	13–3–1	Jung Chan-sung	TKO (punches)	UFC Fight Night: Moicano vs. The Korean Zombie	June 22, 2019	1	0:58	Greenville, South Carolina, United States	
Loss	13–2–1	José Aldo	TKO (punches)	UFC Fight Night: Assunção vs. Moraes 2	February 2, 2019	2	0:44	Fortaleza, Brazil	
Win	13–1–1	Cub Swanson	Submission (rear-naked choke)	UFC 227	August 4, 2018	1	4:15	Los Angeles, California, United States	Performance of the Night.
Win	12–1–1	Calvin Kattar	Decision (unanimous)	UFC 223	April 7, 2018	3	5:00	Brooklyn, New York, United States	
Loss	11–1–1	Brian Ortega	Submission (guillotine choke)	UFC 214	July 29, 2017	3	2:59	Anaheim, California, United States	Fight of the Night.
Win	11–0–1	Jeremy Stephens	Decision (split)	UFC on Fox: Johnson vs. Reis	April 15, 2017	3	5:00	Kansas City, Missouri, United States	
Win	10–0–1	Zubaira Tukhugov	Decision (split)	UFC 198	May 14, 2016	3	5:00	Curitiba, Brazil	
Win	9–0–1	Tom Niinimäki	Submission (rear-naked choke)	UFC Fight Night: Machida vs. Dollaway	December 20, 2014	2	3:30	Barueri, Brazil	
Win	8–0–1	Ismael Bonfim	Submission (rear-naked choke)	Jungle Fight 71	July 19, 2014	1	2:59	São Paulo, Brazil	Won the interim Jungle Fight Featherweight Championship.
Win	7–0–1	Nilson Pereira	Decision (unanimous)	Jungle Fight 55	July 20, 2013	3	5:00	Rio de Janeiro, Brazil	
Win	6–0–1	Mauro Chaulet	Submission (rear-naked choke)	Jungle Fight 50	May 6, 2013	2	2:53	Novo Hamburgo, Brazil	
Draw	5–0–1	Felipe Froes	Draw (majority)	Shooto Brazil 36	November 23, 2012	3	5:00	Brasília, Brazil	
Win	5–0	Iliarde Santos	Decision (unanimous)	Jungle Fight 29	June 25, 2011	3	5:00	Serra, Brazil	
Win	4–0	João Luiz Nogueira	Decision (unanimous)	Jungle Fight 25	February 19, 2011	3	5:00	Vila Velha, Brazil	
Win	3–0	Eduardo Felipe	Submission (rear-naked choke)	Jungle Fight 24	December 18, 2010	2	2:49	Rio de Janeiro, Brazil	
Win	2–0	João Paulo Rodrigues	Decision (unanimous)	Jungle Fight 21	July 31, 2010	3	5:00	Natal, Brazil	
Win	1–0	Alexandre Almeida	Submission (rear-naked choke)	Jungle Fight 18	May 20, 2010	3	1:56	São Paulo, Brazil	Featherweight debut.

== Submission grappling record ==
1 Match, 1 Win, 0 Losses
Result	Rec.	Opponent	Method	Event	Date	Location
Win	1–0	(United States) Chase Hooper	Decision (unanimous)	Fury Pro Grappling 3	30 December 2021	Philadelphia, Pennsylvania, United States

== Pay-per-view bouts ==
No.	Event	Fight	Date	Venue	City	PPV buys
1.	UFC 311	Makhachev vs. Moicano	January 18, 2025	Intuit Dome	Inglewood, California, United States	Not Disclosed

== See also ==
- List of current UFC fighters
- List of male mixed martial artists
