= UFC 267 =

2021 mixed martial arts event

UFC 267: Błachowicz vs. Teixeira
- The poster for UFC 267: Błachowicz vs. Teixeira
- Promotion: Ultimate Fighting Championship
- Date: October 30, 2021
- Venue: Etihad Arena
- City: Abu Dhabi, United Arab Emirates
- Attendance: 10,171

Event chronology
| UFC Fight Night: Costa vs. Vettori | UFC 267: Błachowicz vs. Teixeira | UFC 268: Usman vs. Covington 2 |

UFC 267: Błachowicz vs. Teixeira was a mixed martial arts event produced by the Ultimate Fighting Championship that took place on October 30, 2021, at the Etihad Arena in Abu Dhabi, United Arab Emirates.

== Background ==
This event took place in the evening in Abu Dhabi, which was the morning and afternoon in North America. It was the first numbered UFC event that was not pay-per-view in the United States since UFC 138 in 2011.

A UFC Light Heavyweight Championship bout between current champion Jan Błachowicz (also former KSW Light Heavyweight Champion) and former title challenger Glover Teixeira was expected to take place at UFC 266. However, the bout was pushed back in late June and headlined this event. Former Rizin Light Heavyweight Champion Jiří Procházka served as backup and potential replacement for this fight.

A UFC Bantamweight Championship rematch between current champion Aljamain Sterling and the former champion Petr Yan was expected to take place at this event. The duo had previously met earlier this year at UFC 259 with Sterling winning the fight (and title) by disqualification (intentional illegal knee strike) in the fourth round, becoming the first fighter to win a UFC title by disqualification. However, on September 25, Sterling withdrew from the contest due to lingering neck issues. Cory Sandhagen stepped in for Yan for an interim championship.

A lightweight bout between former UFC Lightweight Champion Rafael dos Anjos and Islam Makhachev was also expected to take place at the event. The pairing has previously been scheduled and cancelled twice. First in October 2020 at UFC 254 and then two weeks later at UFC Fight Night: Felder vs. dos Anjos with both participants pulling out due to separate health related issues. However, dos Anjos was yet again forced to withdraw from the bout due to injury. He was replaced by Dan Hooker.

A featherweight bout between Zubaira Tukhugov and Ricardo Ramos took place at this event. The pairing previously was scheduled to compete at UFC Fight Night: Edwards vs. Muhammad, but Tukhugov pulled out due to undisclosed reasons.

A light heavyweight bout between former light heavyweight title challenger Volkan Oezdemir and Magomed Ankalaev was originally expected to take place at UFC Fight Night: Brunson vs. Till. However, the bout was postponed to this event for unknown reasons.

A middleweight bout between Alen Amedovski and Hu Yaozong was expected to take place at the event. The pairing was previously scheduled to take place at UFC 264, but it was cancelled just hours before taking place due to COVID-19 protocol issues in Amedovski's camp. However, Amedovski was removed from the event due to undisclosed reasons and replaced by Andre Petroski.

A featherweight bout between Makwan Amirkhani and Tristan Connelly was expected to take place at the event. However, Connelly withdrew in early September for unknown reasons. Lerone Murphy stepped in to replace Connelly.

A middleweight bout between Alessio Di Chirico and promotional newcomer Albert Duraev was briefly linked to the event. However, Di Chirico was removed from the pairing on September 22 due to undisclosed reasons and replaced by Roman Kopylov.

A heavyweight bout between Walt Harris and Tai Tuivasa was scheduled for this event. However, Harris pulled out of the bout and Tuivasa was rescheduled to face Augusto Sakai at UFC Fight Night: Vieira vs. Tate.

A lightweight bout between Damir Ismagulov and Magomed Mustafaev was expected to take place at the event. However at the weigh-ins, Ismagulov came in at 163.5 pounds, missing weight by seven and half pounds over the lightweight non-title fight limit. The bout was subsequently cancelled by the UFC.

== Results ==
Main card (ESPN+)
| Weight class | | | | Method | Round | Time | Notes |
|---|---|---|---|---|---|---|---|
| Light Heavyweight | Glover Teixeira | def. | Jan Błachowicz (c) | Submission (rear-naked choke) | 2 | 3:02 | (Note: For the UFC Light Heavyweight Championship.) |
| Bantamweight | Petr Yan | def. | Cory Sandhagen | Decision (unanimous) (49–46, 49–46, 49–46) | 5 | 5:00 | (Note: For the interim UFC Bantamweight Championship.) |
| Lightweight | Islam Makhachev | def. | Dan Hooker | Submission (kimura) | 1 | 2:25 |
| Heavyweight | Alexander Volkov | def. | Marcin Tybura | Decision (unanimous) (30–27, 30–27, 29–28) | 3 | 5:00 |
| Welterweight | Khamzat Chimaev | def. | Li Jingliang | Technical Submission (rear-naked choke) | 1 | 3:16 |
| Light Heavyweight | Magomed Ankalaev | def. | Volkan Oezdemir | Decision (unanimous) (30–27, 30–27, 29–28) | 3 | 5:00 |
Preliminary card (ESPN+)
| Women’s Strawweight | Amanda Ribas | def. | Virna Jandiroba | Decision (unanimous) (29–28, 29–28, 29–28) | 3 | 5:00 |
| Featherweight | Zubaira Tukhugov | def. | Ricardo Ramos | Decision (unanimous) (29–28, 29–28, 29–28) | 3 | 5:00 |
| Middleweight | Albert Duraev | def. | Roman Kopylov | Decision (unanimous) (30–27, 29–27, 29–27) | 3 | 5:00 |
| Welterweight | Elizeu Zaleski dos Santos | def. | Benoît Saint Denis | Decision (unanimous) (29–26, 29–26, 29–26) | 3 | 5:00 | (Note: Zaleski dos Santos was deducted 1 point in Round 3 due to a groin strike.) |
| Light Heavyweight | Michał Oleksiejczuk | def. | Shamil Gamzatov | TKO (punches) | 1 | 3:31 |
| Featherweight | Lerone Murphy | def. | Makwan Amirkhani | KO (knee) | 2 | 0:14 |
| Middleweight | Andre Petroski | def. | Hu Yaozong | Submission (arm-triangle choke) | 3 | 4:46 |
| Flyweight | Tagir Ulanbekov | def. | Allan Nascimento | Decision (split) (28–29, 29–28, 29–28) | 3 | 5:00 |

== Bonus awards ==
The following fighters received $50,000 bonuses.

- Fight of the Night: Petr Yan vs. Cory Sandhagen
- Performance of the Night: Glover Teixeira and Khamzat Chimaev

== See also ==
- List of UFC events
- List of current UFC fighters
- 2021 in UFC
