= UFC Fight Night: Hermansson vs. Pyfer =

2024 mixed martial event in Nevada, US

- The poster for UFC Fight Night: Hermansson vs. Pyfer
- Promotion: Ultimate Fighting Championship
- Date: February 10, 2024
- Venue: UFC Apex
- City: Enterprise, Nevada, United States
- Attendance: Not announced

Event chronology
UFC Fight Night: Dolidze vs. Imavov	UFC Fight Night: Hermansson vs. Pyfer	UFC 298: Volkanovski vs. Topuria

UFC Fight Night: Hermansson vs. Pyfer (also known as UFC Fight Night 236, UFC on ESPN+ 94 and UFC Vegas 86) was a mixed martial arts event produced by the Ultimate Fighting Championship that took place on February 10, 2024, at the UFC Apex facility, in Enterprise, Nevada, part of the Las Vegas Metropolitan Area, United States.

== Background ==
A middleweight bout between Jack Hermansson and Joe Pyfer headlined the event.

A middleweight bout between Rodolfo Vieira and Armen Petrosyan took place at the event. The pairing was previously scheduled to meet at UFC Fight Night: Almeida vs. Lewis, but the bout was scrapped after Petrosyan became ill backstage during the event.

Lerone Murphy was expected to face Dan Ige in a featherweight bout at the event. However, Murphy pulled out in mid January due to an undisclosed injury and was replaced by Andre Fili.

Shayilan Nuerdanbieke was expected to meet Hyder Amil in a featherweight bout at the event, but he pulled out due to undisclosed reasons and was replaced by Melsik Baghdasaryan. In turn, Baghdasaryan pulled out on fight week due to injury and was replaced by Fernie Garcia.

Robert Bryczek and Albert Duraev were expected to meet in a middleweight bout at this event. However, Duraev pulled out due to visa issues and was briefly replaced by Dylan Budka, but medical issues prevented him from competing. Bryczek faced Ihor Potieria instead. At the weigh-ins, Potieria weighed in at 187.5 pounds, one and a half pounds over the middleweight non-title fight limit. The bout proceeded at catchweight with Potieria forfeiting 20 percent of his purse, which went to Bryczek.

A lightweight bout between Damir Hadžović and Bolaji Oki was expected to take place at the event. However, Hadžović withdrew due to visa issues and was replaced by Timothy Cuamba.

== Results ==
Main card (ESPN+)
Weight class				Method	Round	Time	Notes
Middleweight	Jack Hermansson	def.	Joe Pyfer	Decision (unanimous) (48–47, 48–47, 48–47)	5	5:00
Featherweight	Dan Ige	def.	Andre Fili	KO (punches)	1	2:43
Catchweight (187.5 lb)	Ihor Potieria	def.	Robert Bryczek	Decision (unanimous) (30–27, 30–27, 29–28)	3	5:00
Middleweight	Gregory Rodrigues	def.	Brad Tavares	TKO (punches)	3	0:55
Lightweight	Michael Johnson	def.	Darrius Flowers	Decision (unanimous) (30–27, 30–27, 30–27)	3	5:00
Middleweight	Rodolfo Vieira	def.	Armen Petrosyan	Submission (arm-triangle choke)	1	4:48
Preliminary card (ESPN+)
Welterweight	Carlos Prates	def.	Trevin Giles	KO (punch)	2	4:03
Lightweight	Bolaji Oki	def.	Timothy Cuamba	Decision (split) (28–29, 29–28, 29–28)	3	5:00
Women's Strawweight	Loma Lookboonmee	def.	Bruna Brasil	Decision (unanimous) (29–28, 29–28, 29–28)	3	5:00
Light Heavyweight	Marcin Prachnio	def.	Devin Clark	Decision (unanimous) (30–27, 30–27, 30–27)	3	5:00
Welterweight	Max Griffin	def.	Jeremiah Wells	Decision (split) (29–28, 28–29, 29–28)	3	5:00
Light Heavyweight	Bogdan Guskov	def.	Zac Pauga	KO (punches)	1	3:38
Featherweight	Hyder Amil	def.	Fernie Garcia	TKO (punches)	2	2:12
Bantamweight	Daniel Marcos	vs.	Aori Qileng	No Contest (accidental groin kick)	2	3:28	(Note: Accidental groin strike rendered Qileng unable to continue.)

== Bonus awards ==
The following fighters received $50,000 bonuses.

- Fight of the Night: No bonus awarded.
- Performance of the Night: Dan Ige, Rodolfo Vieira, Carlos Prates, and Bogdan Guskov

== See also ==
- 2024 in UFC
- List of current UFC fighters
- List of UFC events
