= Joshua Culibao =

Australian mixed martial artist

- Born: May 24, 1994 (age 32); Sydney, New South Wales, Australia
- Other names: Kuya
- Height: 5 ft 10 in (1.78 m)
- Weight: 145 lb (66 kg; 10 st 5 lb)
- Division: Lightweight; Featherweight
- Reach: 73 in (185 cm)
- Fighting out of: Sydney, New South Wales
- Team: Igor MMA
- Rank: Purple belt in Brazilian Jiu-Jitsu
- Years active: 2016–present

Mixed martial arts record
- Total: 16
- Wins: 11
- By knockout: 5
- By submission: 1
- By decision: 5
- Losses: 4
- By knockout: 1
- By decision: 3
- Draws: 1

Other information
- Mixed martial arts record from Sherdog

Joshua Culibao (born May 24, 1994) is an Australian mixed martial artist who competed in the Featherweight division of the Ultimate Fighting Championship.

== Background ==
The youngest of four siblings in a Filipino family, with his mother from Boracay while his father is from Pampanga, he was given the nickname "Kuya", a familial term used in a respectful manner to address an older male relative, brother, or friend, by his teammates at the Sydney-based Igor MMA, since he calls everyone in the gym by the Filipino kin endearment. Having practised taekwondo in his childhood, Culibao eventually started training mixed martial arts in order to lose weight in his adolescent years.

Before signing with the UFC, Culibao was a full-time electrician doing 40-plus-hour workweeks with training on top.

== Mixed martial arts career ==
=== Early career ===
Starting his professional MMA career in 2016, Culibao compiled a perfect 8–0 record on the regional Australian scene, capturing three titles during this time. He won his debut at Superfight MMA 2 on February 19, 2016, by stopping Paul Traish in the first round via TKO. He would win his next two fights in the Urban Fight Night promotion; winning via majority decision against Brad Shortland at UFN 7 on May 7, 2016 and via TKO against Simon Arentz at UFN 8 on August 27, 2016. Culibao would fight his next two bouts in the Hex Fight Series promotion, winning the HEX Featherweight Championship against Raphael Berthet at HFS 7 after dropping his with a body shot and finishing him with soccer kicks. He defended this title at HFS 8 against Jordan Cameron, who he beat in a close bout via split decision. After returning to Urban Fight Nights for one bout which he won via majority decision against James McGlashan, Culibao won the DFC Featherweight Championship against Rodolfo Marques at DFC 7 on November 10, 2018, via head kick and ground and pound. He would then capture the Superfight MMA Featherweight championship against Josh Payne at Superfight MMA 10 on March 1, 2019, winning the bout via TKO in the first round.

=== Ultimate Fighting Championship ===
Culibao signed with the UFC in February 2020 to replace Jamie Mullarkey on short notice against Jalin Turner at UFC Fight Night: Felder vs. Hooker on February 23, 2020. He lost the fight via second-round knockout.

He made his sophomore appearance against Charles Jourdain at UFC on ESPN: Holm vs. Aldana on October 4, 2020. The bout ended in a split draw, which drew ire with most of the media scoring it for Jourdain.

Culibao faced Shayilan Nuerdanbieke at UFC Fight Night: Font vs. Garbrandt on May 22, 2021. He won the fight by unanimous decision.

Culibao was scheduled to face Damon Jackson on March 12, 2022 UFC Fight Night 203. However, Culibao was pulled from the event for undisclosed reasons and he was replaced by Kamuela Kirk.

Culibao faced Seung Woo Choi on June 11, 2022, at UFC 275. After knocking his opponent down multiple times during the fight, Culibao won the bout via split decision.

Culibao faced Melsik Baghdasaryan on February 12, 2023, at UFC 284. He won the fight via a rear-naked choke submission in the second round.

Culibao faced Lerone Murphy on July 22, 2023, at UFC on ESPN+ 82. He lost the fight via unanimous decision.

Culibao faced Danny Silva on March 16, 2024, at UFC Fight Night 239. At the weigh-in, Silva weighed in at 148.5 pounds, two and a half pounds over the featherweight non-title fight limit. The bout proceeded at catchweight and Silva was fined 20% of his purse which went to Culibao. He lost the bout via split decision.

Culibao faced Ricardo Ramos on August 17, 2024, at UFC 305. He lost the fight by split decision. 8 out of 12 media outlets scored the bout for Culibao.

On February 27, 2025, it was reported that Culibao was removed from the UFC roster.

== Championships and accomplishments ==
- Hex Fight Series
  - HEX Featherweight Championship (one time; former)
    - One successful title defense
- Diamondback FC
  - DFC Featherweight Championship (one time; former)
- Superfight MMA
  - Superfight MMA Featherweight Championship (one time; former)

== Mixed martial arts record ==
Professional record breakdown
16 matches	11 wins	4 losses
By knockout	5	1
By submission	1	0
By decision	5	3
Draws	1	

Res.	Record	Opponent	Method	Event	Date	Round	Time	Location	Notes
Loss	11–4–1	Ricardo Ramos	Decision (split)	UFC 305	August 18, 2024	3	5:00	Perth, Australia	
Loss	11–3–1	Danny Silva	Decision (split)	UFC Fight Night: Tuivasa vs. Tybura	March 16, 2024	3	5:00	Las Vegas, Nevada, United States	Catchweight (148.5 lb) bout; Silva missed weight.
Loss	11–2–1	Lerone Murphy	Decision (unanimous)	UFC Fight Night: Aspinall vs. Tybura	July 22, 2023	3	5:00	London, England	
Win	11–1–1	Melsik Baghdasaryan	Submission (rear-naked choke)	UFC 284	February 12, 2023	2	2:02	Perth, Australia	
Win	10–1–1	Choi Seung-woo	Decision (split)	UFC 275	June 11, 2022	3	5:00	Kallang, Singapore	
Win	9–1–1	Shayilan Nuerdanbieke	Decision (unanimous)	UFC Fight Night: Font vs. Garbrandt	May 22, 2021	3	5:00	Las Vegas, Nevada, United States	
Draw	8–1–1	Charles Jourdain	Draw (split)	UFC on ESPN: Holm vs. Aldana	October 4, 2020	3	5:00	Abu Dhabi, United Arab Emirates	Return to Featherweight.
Loss	8–1	Jalin Turner	TKO (punches)	UFC Fight Night: Felder vs. Hooker	February 23, 2020	2	3:01	Auckland, New Zealand	Lightweight debut.
Win	8–0	Josh Payne	TKO (punches)	Superfight MMA 10	March 1, 2019	1	3:02	Punchbowl, Australia	Won the vacant Superfight MMA Featherweight Championship.
Win	7–0	Rodolfo Marques	TKO (head kick and punches)	Diamondback FC 7	November 10, 2018	4	0:00	North Adelaide, Australia	Won the vacant DFC Featherweight Championship.
Win	6–0	James McGlashan	Decision (majority)	Urban Fight Night 13	December 2, 2017	3	5:00	Liverpool, Australia	
Win	5–0	Jordan Cameron	Decision (split)	Hex Fight Series 8	March 31, 2017	5	5:00	Melbourne, Australia	Defended the HEX Featherweight Championship.
Win	4–0	Raphael Berthet	TKO (punch to the body and soccer kicks)	Hex Fight Series 7	December 2, 2016	5	1:35	Melbourne, Australia	Won the HEX Featherweight Championship.
Win	3–0	Simon Arentz	TKO (punches)	Urban Fight Night 8	August 27, 2016	1	4:49	Liverpool, Australia	Catchweight (146.2 lb) bout; Culibao missed weight.
Win	2–0	Brad Shortland	Decision (majority)	Urban Fight Night 7	May 7, 2016	3	5:00	Liverpool, Australia	
Win	1–0	Paul Traish	TKO (punches)	Superfight MMA 2	February 19, 2016	1	4:28	Sydney, Australia	Featherweight debut.

== See also ==
- List of male mixed martial artists
