= Lerone Murphy =

British mixed martial arts fighter

- Born: 22 July 1991 (age 35); Manchester, England
- Other names: The Miracle; The Iceman
- Height: 5 ft 9 in (1.75 m)
- Weight: 145 lb (66 kg; 10 st 5 lb)
- Division: Featherweight (2017-present); Lightweight (2016-2017)
- Reach: 73 1/2 in (187 cm)
- Fighting out of: Manchester, England
- Team: All Powers MMA (2013–2019); Manchester Top Team (2019–present)
- Rank: Purple belt in Brazilian Jiu-Jitsu
- Years active: 2016–present

Mixed martial arts record
- Total: 19
- Wins: 17
- By knockout: 8
- By decision: 9
- Losses: 1
- By decision: 1
- Draws: 1

Other information
- Mixed martial arts record from Sherdog

Lerone Murphy (born 22 July 1991) is a British professional mixed martial artist who currently competes in the Featherweight division of the Ultimate Fighting Championship (UFC). As of 3 February 2026, he is #3 in Meta UFC featherweight rankings.

== Background ==
Murphy, who was born and raised in Old Trafford, Greater Manchester, went to St Edward's Primary School in Rusholme and St Mary's Levenshulme and St Anne's High Catholic High School in Heaton Chapel, Stockport. He had been a promising footballer, who went on trials for Liverpool F.C. and had trained with both Stockport County and FC United as a teenager, until at the age of 16 after he suffered a serious knee injury that prematurely ended his football dreams. Being the nephew of Manchester boxing trainer, the late Oliver Harrison, who had trained the likes of Amir Khan and Rocky Fielding, Murphy had done some boxing training, but started his MMA training when he walked into the All Powers gym.

On Saturday 25 May 2013 Lerone, having just left a barber shop on Lloyd Street South in the Manchester suburb of Fallowfield, was shot by a gunman. Lerone was hit by three bullets, being hit on the face and neck twice. Due to the injuries Murphy had to get a set of prosthetic teeth, and has a tiny shard of bullet permanently embedded in his tongue.

== Mixed martial arts career ==
=== Early career ===
Making his MMA debut at FCC 15, he faced Martin Fouda and went on to defeat him via unanimous decision. Murphy would go on to defeat Tyler Thomas at Tanko FC 3, Jamie Lee at FCC 18, Nathan Thompson at FCC 19, Terry Doyle at FightStar Championship 14, all via first round TKO. He would go on to defeat his next two opponents via unanimous decision; James McErlean at Evolution Of Combat Fight Night 2 and Anton De Paepe at Celtic Gladiator 22. For his final appearance in the UK regional scene, Murphy won the FCC Featherweight Championship at FCC 23 against Manolo Schianna via TKO in the first round.

=== Ultimate Fighting Championship ===
Murphy made his UFC debut against Zubaira Tukhugov on 7 September 2019 at UFC 242. The back-and-forth fight ended in a split draw with one judge assigning each fighter a 29–28 win and the third seeing it as a 28–28 draw.

Murphy faced Ricardo Ramos on 16 July 2020 at UFC on ESPN 13. He won the fight via technical knockout in round one, earning himself a Performance of the Night bonus.

After his second fight in the promotion, Murphy renewed his contract with the UFC.

Murphy faced Douglas Silva de Andrade on 20 January 2021 at UFC on ESPN 20. He won the bout via unanimous decision.

Murphy was scheduled to face Charles Jourdain on 4 September 2021 at UFC Fight Night 191. However, Murphy was pulled from the event due to visa issues, and he was replaced by Julian Erosa.

Replacing an injured Tristan Connelly, Murphy stepped in on short notice against Makwan Amirkhani at UFC 267 on 30 October 2021. Murphy won the bout via knockout early in the second round.

Murphy was scheduled to face Nate Landwehr on 26 March 2022 at UFC on ESPN 33. However, Murphy withdrew from the bout for undisclosed reasons and was replaced by David Onama.

Murphy was scheduled to face Nathaniel Wood on 18 March 2023 at UFC 286. However, Wood was forced to withdraw from the event due to leg injury and was replaced by UFC newcomer Gabriel Santos. Murphy won the fight via split decision.

Murphy faced Joshua Culibao on 22 July 2023 at UFC Fight Night 224. He won the fight via unanimous decision.

Murphy was scheduled to face Dan Ige on 10 February 2024 at UFC Fight Night 236. However, Murphy pulled out in mid-January due to an undisclosed injury.

Murphy faced Edson Barboza on 18 May 2024 at UFC Fight Night 241. He won the fight by unanimous decision. This fight earned him the Fight of the Night award.

Murphy faced Dan Ige on 26 October 2024 at UFC 308. He won the bout via unanimous decision.

Murphy faced former interim UFC Featherweight Championship challenger Josh Emmett on 5 April 2025 in the main event at UFC on ESPN 65. He won the fight by unanimous decision.

Murphy faced Aaron Pico on 16 August 2025 in the co-main event of UFC 319. He won the fight via knockout with a spinning back elbow in round one. This win earned Murphy his second Performance of the Night award.

Murphy faced fellow undefeated contender Movsar Evloev in the main event title eliminator bout on 21 March 2026, at UFC Fight Night 270. Despite being the recipient of repeated groin strikes that resulted in a point deduction for Evloev in the fourth round, Murphy ultimately lost the fight by majority decision, marking the first defeat of his mixed martial arts career. 12 out of 17 media outlets scored the bout as a draw while the remaining five scored it for Murphy.

== Personal life ==
In May 2022 Murphy was hit by a car while cycling. He was knocked off his bike and almost bled to death.

== Championships and accomplishments ==
=== Mixed martial arts ===
- Full Contact Contender
  - FCC Featherweight Championship (One time)
- Ultimate Fighting Championship
  - Fight of the Night (One time) vs. Edson Barboza
  - Performance of the Night (Two times) vs. Ricardo Ramos and Aaron Pico
  - Tied (Movsar Evloev) for fourth longest win streak in UFC Featherweight division history (9)
  - UFC Honors Awards
    - 2025: President's Choice Performance of the Year Winner & Fan's Choice Knockout of the Year Nominee vs. Aaron Pico
  - UFC.com Awards
    - 2025: Knockout of the Year vs. Aaron Pico
- MMA Junkie
  - 2021 October Knockout of the Month vs. Makwan Amirkhani
- Sherdog
  - 2025 Knockout of the Year vs. Aaron Pico at UFC 319
- Bloody Elbow
  - 2025 Knockout of the Year vs. Aaron Pico at UFC 319
- MMA Mania
  - 2025 Knockout of the Year vs. Aaron Pico at UFC 319
- MMA Fighting
  - 2025 #2 Ranked Knockout of the Year vs. Aaron Pico at UFC 319
- Uncrowned
  - 2025 Knockout of the Year vs. Aaron Pico at UFC 319

== Mixed martial arts record ==
Professional record breakdown
| 19 matches | 17 wins | 1 loss |
| By knockout | 8 | 0 |
| By decision | 9 | 1 |
| Draws | 1 | |

| Res. | Record | Opponent | Method | Event | Date | Round | Time | Location | Notes |
|---|---|---|---|---|---|---|---|---|---|
| Loss | 17–1–1 | Movsar Evloev | Decision (majority) | UFC Fight Night: Evloev vs. Murphy | 21 March 2026 | 5 | 5:00 | London, England | UFC Featherweight title eliminator. Evloev was deducted one point in round 4 due to an illegal groin strike. |
| Win | 17–0–1 | Aaron Pico | KO (spinning back elbow) | UFC 319 | 16 August 2025 | 1 | 3:21 | Chicago, Illinois, United States | Performance of the Night. |
| Win | 16–0–1 | Josh Emmett | Decision (unanimous) | UFC on ESPN: Emmett vs. Murphy | 5 April 2025 | 5 | 5:00 | Las Vegas, Nevada, United States | |
| Win | 15–0–1 | Dan Ige | Decision (unanimous) | UFC 308 | 26 October 2024 | 3 | 5:00 | Abu Dhabi, United Arab Emirates | |
| Win | 14–0–1 | Edson Barboza | Decision (unanimous) | UFC Fight Night: Barboza vs. Murphy | 18 May 2024 | 5 | 5:00 | Las Vegas, Nevada, United States | Fight of the Night. |
| Win | 13–0–1 | Joshua Culibao | Decision (unanimous) | UFC Fight Night: Aspinall vs. Tybura | 22 July 2023 | 3 | 5:00 | London, England | |
| Win | 12–0–1 | Gabriel Santos | Decision (split) | UFC 286 | 18 March 2023 | 3 | 5:00 | London, England | |
| Win | 11–0–1 | Makwan Amirkhani | KO (knee) | UFC 267 | 30 October 2021 | 2 | 0:14 | Abu Dhabi, United Arab Emirates | |
| Win | 10–0–1 | Douglas Silva de Andrade | Decision (unanimous) | UFC on ESPN: Chiesa vs. Magny | 20 January 2021 | 3 | 5:00 | Abu Dhabi, United Arab Emirates | |
| Win | 9–0–1 | Ricardo Ramos | TKO (punches) | UFC on ESPN: Kattar vs. Ige | 16 July 2020 | 1 | 4:18 | Abu Dhabi, United Arab Emirates | Performance of the Night. |
| Draw | 8–0–1 | Zubaira Tukhugov | Draw (split) | UFC 242 | 7 September 2019 | 3 | 5:00 | Abu Dhabi, United Arab Emirates | |
| Win | 8–0 | Manolo Scianna | TKO (punches) | Full Contact Contender 23 | 18 May 2019 | 1 | 2:22 | Bolton, England | Won the FCC Featherweight Championship. |
| Win | 7–0 | Ayton De Paepe | Decision (unanimous) | Celtic Gladiator 22 | 30 November 2018 | 3 | 5:00 | Manchester, England | |
| Win | 6–0 | James McErlean | Decision (unanimous) | Evolution of Combat: Fight Night 2 | 1 September 2018 | 3 | 5:00 | Morecambe, England | |
| Win | 5–0 | Terry Doyle | TKO (punches) | FightStar Championship 14 | 14 April 2018 | 1 | 0:42 | London, England | Featherweight debut. |
| Win | 4–0 | Nathan Thompson | TKO (punches) | Full Contact Contender 19 | 30 September 2017 | 1 | 0:48 | Bolton, England | |
| Win | 3–0 | Jamie Lee | TKO (punches) | Full Contact Contender 18 | 15 April 2017 | 1 | 3:55 | Bolton, England | |
| Win | 2–0 | Tyler John Thomas | TKO (punches) | Tankō FC 3 | 11 February 2017 | 1 | 1:55 | Manchester, England | |
| Win | 1–0 | Martin Fouda Afana Bipouna | Decision (unanimous) | Full Contact Contender 15 | 5 March 2016 | 3 | 5:00 | Bolton, England | Lightweight debut. |

== See also ==
- List of current UFC fighters
- List of male mixed martial artists
