= Shayilan Nuerdanbieke =

Chinese mixed martial arts fighter (born 1994)

- Born: 4 May 1994 (age 32); Yili, Xinjiang, China
- Other names: Wolverine
- Height: 5 ft 8 in (1.73 m)
- Weight: 145 lb (66 kg; 10 st 5 lb)
- Division: Featherweight
- Reach: 69 in (175 cm)
- Style: Greco-Roman wrestling
- Stance: Orthodox
- Fighting out of: Beijing, China
- Team: China Top Team; Sanford MMA
- Years active: 2016–present

Mixed martial arts record
- Total: 51
- Wins: 39
- By knockout: 19
- By submission: 10
- By decision: 10
- Losses: 12
- By knockout: 3
- By submission: 7
- By decision: 2

Other information
- Mixed martial arts record from Sherdog

Shayilan Nuerdanbieke

Chinese name
- Simplified Chinese: 沙依兰·努尔丹别克
- Traditional Chinese: 沙依蘭·努爾丹別克
Transcriptions
Standard Mandarin
- Hanyu Pinyin: Shāyīlán Nǔěrdānbiékè

Kazakh name
- Kazakh: Сайран Нұрданбек; Sayran Nurdanbek

Shayilan Nuerdanbieke (Chinese: 沙依兰·努尔丹别克; Kazakh: Сайран Нұрданбек, romanized: Sayran Nurdanbek ; born 4 May 1994) is a Chinese mixed martial artist (MMA) who competed in the Featherweight division of the Ultimate Fighting Championship. An ethnic Kazakh from Northern Xinjiang, Shayilan became interested in MMA after watching Conor McGregor fight on television.

== Background ==
Sayran comes from the Ili Kazakh Autonomous Prefecture of northern Xinjiang, China, straddling the borders of Kazakhstan, Russia and Mongolia. He belongs to the Kazakh ethnic minority in China and trained in wrestling for six years. He won the 66KG Classical Wrestling Championship in Xinjiang and participated in many national competitions. After seeing Irish MMA fighter Conor McGregor on television, he was inspired to try his hand in MMA.

He spends his free time practicing the dombra, a traditional stringed Kazakh musical instrument.

== Mixed martial arts career ==
=== Early career ===
Starting his professional career in 2016, Sayran compiled a 37–9 record fighting on the Chinese regional scene.

=== Ultimate Fighting Championship ===
Sayran made his UFC debut against Joshua Culibao at UFC Fight Night 188 on 22 May 2021. He lost the fight by unanimous decision.

Nuerdanbieke faced Sean Soriano on 20 November 2021 at UFC Fight Night 198. He won the bout via unanimous decision.

Nuerdanbieke faced T.J. Brown on 25 June 2022 at UFC on ESPN 38. He won the fight via unanimous decision.

Nuerdanbieke faced Darrick Minner on 5 November 2022 at UFC Fight Night 214. He won the fight via technical knockout in the first round. The fight was later part of a controversy when Minner and his coach James Krause were suspended by UFC when suspicious betting patterns emerged.

Nuerdanbieke faced Steve Garcia on 8 April 2023, at UFC 287. Despite knocking down Garcia, Nuerdanbieke lost the fight via TKO in the second round via body kick and then ground and pound.

Nuerdanbieke was scheduled to face Hyder Amil on 10 February 2024, at UFC Fight Night 236, but was pulled from the card in mid January for undisclosed reasons.

Nuerdanbieke faced Melquizael Costa on 15 June 2024 at UFC on ESPN 58. He lost the fight by a face crank submission in the third round.

On 12 August 2026, it was reported that Nuerdanbieke requested his release from the promotion and was officially removed from the roster.

== Mixed martial arts record ==
Professional record breakdown
51 matches	39 wins	12 losses
By knockout	19	3
By submission	10	7
By decision	10	2

Res.	Record	Opponent	Method	Event	Date	Round	Time	Location	Notes
Loss	39–12	Melquizael Costa	Submission (face crank)	UFC on ESPN: Perez vs. Taira	15 June 2024	3	1:50	Las Vegas, Nevada, United States	
Loss	39–11	Steve Garcia	TKO (body kick and punches)	UFC 287	8 April 2023	2	0:36	Miami, Florida, United States	
Win	39–10	Darrick Minner	TKO (elbows)	UFC Fight Night: Rodriguez vs. Lemos	5 November 2022	1	1:07	Las Vegas, Nevada, United States	
Win	38–10	T.J. Brown	Decision (unanimous)	UFC on ESPN: Tsarukyan vs. Gamrot	25 June 2022	3	5:00	Las Vegas, Nevada, United States	
Win	37–10	Sean Soriano	Decision (unanimous)	UFC Fight Night: Vieira vs. Tate	20 November 2021	3	5:00	Las Vegas, Nevada, United States	
Loss	36–10	Joshua Culibao	Decision (unanimous)	UFC Fight Night: Font vs. Garbrandt	22 May 2021	3	5:00	Las Vegas, Nevada, United States	Return to Featherweight.
Win	36–9	Tanzhao Wang	Submission (rear-naked choke)	JCK Bounty Challenge Series: 2020 Trials Championship	December 26, 2020	1	2:59	Langfang, China	
Win	35–9	Nuerdebieke Bahetihan	Decision (unanimous)	JCK Bounty Challenge Series: 2020 Trials Elimination Round 1	November 27, 2020	3	5:00	Langfang, China	
Loss	34–9	Rong Zhu	KO (punches)	WLF W.A.R.S. 47	September 25, 2020	1	2:05	Zhengzhou, China	For the WLF Lightweight Championship.
Win	34–8	Huwanixi Wusikenbieke	Submission (arm-triangle choke)	WLF W.A.R.S. 46	August 21, 2020	1	4:03	Zhengzhou, China	
Win	33–8	Yibugele	TKO (punches)	WLF W.A.R.S. 43	May 22, 2020	3	4:40	Zhengzhou, China	Return to Lightweight.
Win	32–8	Alexey Oleinik	TKO (retirement)	WLF W.A.R.S. 41	January 3, 2020	1	5:00	Zhengzhou, China	
Win	31–8	Kikadze Bondo	Submission (rear-naked choke)	WLF W.A.R.S. 39	October 18, 2019	1	2:51	Zhengzhou, China	Return to Featherweight.
Win	30–8	Wilson Djavan	Decision (unanimous)	ICKF: World Combat Championship	August 1, 2019	3	5:00	São Lázaro, Macau	
Loss	29–8	Alisson Barbosa	Submission (triangle choke)	WLF W.A.R.S. 33	May 17, 2019	2	3:39	Zhengzhou, China	
Loss	29–7	Bakhtier Ibragimov	KO (body kick)	Kunlun Fight: Elite Fight Night 2	November 6, 2018	1	2:49	Tongling, China	Catchweight (159 lb) bout.
Win	29–6	Yibugele	KO (punches)	Chin Woo Men: 2017–2018 Season: Stage 9	May 12, 2018	1	0:23	Guangzhou, China	
Win	28–6	Syovuzh	KO (punches)	Chin Woo Men: 2017–2018 Season: Stage 8	April 15, 2018	1	1:10	Guangzhou, China	
Loss	27–6	Ruslan Emilbek	Submission (rear-naked choke)	Chin Woo Men: 2017–2018 Season: Stage 6	March 11, 2018	3	4:45	Guangzhou, China	
Win	27–5	Shalawujiang Yeerruer	TKO (body kick and punches)	Chin Woo Men: 2017–2018 Season: Stage 4	January 21, 2018	1	3:37	Hefei, China	
Win	26–5	Shaka Shanzis	Submission (straight armbar)	Chinese Kung Fu Championships	December 21, 2017	1	2:15	Kunming, China	
Win	25–5	Shunya Imai	TKO (punches)	Road FC 44	November 11, 2017	1	3:38	Shijiazhuang, China	Catchweight (157 lb) bout.
Win	24–5	Zack Shaw	TKO (punches)	Kunlun Fight MMA 15	October 3, 2017	1	1:27	Alashan, China	
Loss	23–5	Yibugele	Decision (unanimous)	Chin Woo Men: 2016–2017 Season: Individuals' Finals	September 16, 2017	4	5:00	Guangzhou, China	
Win	23–4	Leandro Rodrigues	TKO (submission to punches)	Kunlun Fight MMA 14	August 28, 2017	1	3:04	Qingdao, China	
Win	22–4	Stefan Pijuk	Decision (unanimous)	CKF Macau	August 10, 2017	3	5:00	Macau	
Win	21–4	David Muñoz	KO (punches)	Kunlun Fight MMA 13	July 6, 2017	1	0:42	Qingdao, China	
Win	20–4	Arthit Hanchana	Decision (unanimous)	Chinese MMA Super League: Day 5	June 17, 2017	3	5:00	Sanya, China	Catchweight (161 lb) bout.
Win	19–4	Junkai Yang	TKO (punches)	Chin Woo Men: 2016–2017 Season: Individuals' Tournament Quarterfinals	June 10, 2017	1	1:17	Guangzhou, China	
Win	18–4	Changzhao Yu	TKO (punches)	Chinese MMA Super League: Finals	April 11, 2017	2	4:52	Shanghai, China	
Win	17–4	Yikun Zhao	Decision (unanimous)	Chinese MMA Super League: Semifinals	10 April 2017	3	5:00	Shanghai, China	
Win	16–4	Swapnil	TKO (punches)	CKF Pacific International Fighting Dali: Day 1	27 March 2017	1	0:41	Dali City, China	
Win	15–4	Huiyong Yang	TKO (punches)	CKF Fighting League Finals 5: Day 2	24 March 2017	1	4:07	Beijing, China	
Win	14–4	Xiaofan Wei	TKO (punches)	CKF Fighting League Finals 5: Day 1	23 March 2017	1	2:04	Beijing, China	
Loss	13–4	Brian Tadeo	Submission (reverse triangle armbar)	WLF W.A.R.S. 12	March 11, 2017	1	2:56	Zhengzhou, China	Catchweight (159 lb) bout.
Loss	13–3	Missael Silva de Souza	Submission (rear-naked choke)	Chin Woo Men: 2016–2017 Season: Desperate Part 1	February 18, 2017	1	2:37	Guangzhou, China	
Win	13–2	Renjie Cao	Submission (armbar)	Chin Woo Men: 2016–2017 Season: Fierce Battle Part 1	January 7, 2017	1	2:09	Guangzhou, China	
Win	12–2	Rodrigo Anraku	KO (slam and punches)	Chinese MMA Super League: Day 4	1 January 2017	1	1:02	Zhongshan, China	
Win	11–2	Zhenyue Huang	Decision (majority)	Chinese MMA Super League: Day 5	October 15, 2016	3	5:00	Tianjin, China	
Win	10–2	Tinggui Lang	Decision (unanimous)	Chinese MMA Super League: Day 4	October 14, 2016	3	5:00	Tianjin, China	
Win	9–2	Jiale Li	TKO (corner stoppage)	Chinese MMA Super League: Day 3	October 13, 2016	1	3:57	Tianjin, China	
Win	8–2	Lei Huang	TKO (punches)	Chinese MMA Super League: Day 1	October 11, 2016	1	1:17	Tianjin, China	
Win	7–2	Temirlan Aysadilov	Decision (split)	Kingway & Beijing Combat	September 29, 2016	3	5:00	Changping, China	Return to Lightweight.
Win	6–2	Nuerjiang	Submission (guillotine choke)	Superstar Fight 5	September 23, 2016	1	2:04	Beijing, China	Welterweight debut.
Win	5–2	Anatoliy	Submission (arm-triangle choke)	WKG International MMA Tournament 3	August 25, 2016	3	2:03	Harbin, China	
Loss	4–2	Tao Zhou	Submission (rear-naked choke)	Art of War: Hero List 2	August 11, 2016	1	6:08	Beijing, China	
Win	4–1	Guicheng Liu	TKO (punches)	Art of War: Hero List	July 14, 2016	1	2:50	Beijing, China	Featherweight debut.
Loss	3–1	Nuerdebieke Bahetihan	Submission (shoulder choke)	Chinese MMA Super League: Day 4	June 6, 2016	2	3:24	Jinzhou, China	Bantamweight debut.
Win	3–0	Mingyang Li	Submission (rear-naked choke)	Chinese MMA Super League: Day 3	June 5, 2016	1	3:56	Jinzhou, China	
Win	2–0	Yusheng Wang	Submission (arm-triangle choke)	Chinese MMA Super League: Day 2	June 4, 2016	1	2:43	Jinzhou, China	
Win	1–0	Avzalbek Kuranbaev	Submission (rear-naked choke)	Bullet Fly FC 6	May 21, 2016	1	2:28	Beijing, China	Lightweight debut.

== See also ==
- List of male mixed martial artists
