= 2011 in AFC =

Mixed martial arts events

Information
- First date: June 25, 2011
- Last date: September 3, 2011

Events
- Total events: 2

Fights
- Total fights: 18

Chronology
2010 in AFC	2011 in AFC	2012 in AFC

The year 2011 was the 2nd year in the history of Australian Fighting Championship (AFC), a mixed martial arts promotion based in Australia. In 2011 AFC held 2 events.

== Events list ==
#	Event title	Date	Arena	Location
3	AFC 2	September 3, 2011	Melbourne Sports and Aquatic Centre	Melbourne, Australia
2	AFC Fight Night	June 25, 2011	State Netball and Hockey Centre	Melbourne, Australia

== AFC 2 ==
AFC 2 was held on September 3, 2011, at Melbourne Sports and Aquatic Centre in Melbourne, Australia.

=== Results ===
Main card
Weight class				Method	Round	Time	Notes
	Héctor Lombard	def.	Jesse Taylor	Submission (heel hook0	2	1:26
	Dylan Andrews	def.	Ross Dallow	TKO (punches)	1	0:57
	Marcin Held	def.	Kaleo Kwan	Submission (inverted heel hook)	1	0:55
	Soa Palelei	def.	Hye Seok Son	TKO (punches)	1	0:28
	Nick Patterson	def.	James Fairman	TKO (punches)	1	4:47
	Rusty McBride	def.	Richard Buhmann	TKO (knees to the body and punches)	1	1:11
	Dan Hooker	def.	Yuma Ishizuka	Decision (unanimous)	3	5:00
	Jack Becker	def.	Ben Hansen	Submission (kneebar)	1	1:57
	Troy Williams	def.	Sam Summers	Submission (armbar)	1	2:25

== AFC Fight Night ==
AFC Fight Night was held on June 25, 2011, at State Netball and Hockey Centre in Melbourne, Australia.

=== Results ===
Main card
Weight class				Method	Round	Time	Notes
	Garetj Ea;eu	def.	Xavier Lucas	Submission (armbar)	1	N/A
	Soa Palelei	def.	Yusuke Kawaguchi	TKO (punches)	1	N/A
	Jacques Marsters	def.	Steve Kennedy	TKO (punches)	1	N/A
	Luke Jumeau	def.	David Johnson	Decision (split)	3	5:00
	Rusty McBride	def.	Yuma Ishizuka	Decision (majority)	3	5:00
	Ben Hansen	def.	Ben Cernotta	TKO (punches)	1	N/A
	Troy Williams	def.	Jake O'Driscoll	Submission (guillotine choke)	1	N/A
	Daniel Way	def.	Stephen Peeles	Submission (guillotine choke)	1	N/A
	Dan Vasilopoulos	def.	Simon Middleton	Submission (guillotine choke)	1	N/A
