= 2012 in AFC =

Mixed martial arts events

Information
- First date: April 14, 2012
- Last date: December 7, 2012

Events
- Total events: 2

Fights
- Total fights: 16
- Title fights: 1

Chronology
2011 in AFC	2012 in AFC	2013 in AFC

The year 2012 was the 3rd year in the history of Australian Fighting Championship (AFC), a mixed martial arts promotion based in Australia. In 2012 AFC held 2 events.

== Events list ==
#	Event title	Date	Arena	Location
5	AFC 4	December 7, 2012	Melbourne Pavilion	Melbourne, Australia
4	AFC 3	April 14, 2012	Geelong Arena	Geelong, Australia

== AFC 4 ==
AFC 4 was held on December 7, 2012, at Melbourne Pavilion in Melbourne, Australia.

=== Results ===
Main card
Weight class				Method	Round	Time	Notes
Heavyweight	Soa Palelei	def.	Sean McCorkle	TKO (punches)	1	1:45	(Note: For the AFC Heavyweight Championship)
Heavyweight	Peter Graham	def.	Donnie Lester	TKO (doctor stoppage)	1	1:50
Featherweight	Ivo dos Santos	def.	Callum Lewis	Decision (unanimous)	3	5:00
Light Heavyweight	Daniel Keely	def.	Fabio Galeb	Decision (unanimous)	3	5:00
Middleweight	Zein Saliba	def.	Vik Grujic	Decision (unanimous)	3	5:00
Middleweight	David Gibb	def.	Mikey Vaotuua	TKO (punches)	2	1:16
Welterweight	Dean Purdon	def.	Jack Shand	Decision (split)	3	3:00
Featherweight	Anthony fogus	def.	Kenan Palliser	Decision (unanimous)	3	3:00
Featherweight	Regan Neoh	def.	Zach Hook	Decision (unanimous)	3	3:00

== AFC 3 ==
AFC 3 was held on April 14, 2012, at Geelong Arena in Geelong, Australia.

=== Results ===
Main card
Weight class				Method	Round	Time	Notes
Heavyweight	Soa Palelei	def.	Joe Kielur	TKO (punches)	1	1:14	(Note: For the AFC Heavyweight Championship)
Lightweight	Dan Hooker	def.	Rusty McBride	TKO (doctor stoppage)	2	3:57	(Note: For AFC Lightweight Championship)
Bantamweight	Richie Vaculik	def.	Matt Jaggers	TKO (punches)	1	2:38
Strawweight	Bec Rawlings	def.	Daniela Marjanovic	Technical Submission (rear-naked choke)	1	0:21
Middleweight	Gene Kapaufs	def.	Sam Faiers	TKO (punches)	3	2:40
Middleweight	Mikey Vaotuua	def.	Troy Resic	Decision (split)	3	5:00
Welterweight	Dan Enson Hyatt	def.	Jamie Stewart	Submission (rear-naked choke)	1	1:47
