= Tuivasa =

Tuivasa is a Samoan surname. Notable people with the surname include:

- Roger Tuivasa-Sheck (born 1993), Samoan-born New Zealand rugby league footballer
- Tai Tuivasa (born 1993), Australian mixed martial artist
