= 2014 in AFC =

Mixed martial arts events

Information
- First date: May 10, 2014
- Last date: December 14, 2014

Events
- Total events: 4

Fights
- Total fights: 31
- Title fights: 3

Chronology
2013 in AFC	2014 in AFC	2015 in AFC

The year 2014 was the 5th year in the history of Australian Fighting Championship (AFC), a mixed martial arts promotion based in Australia. In 2014 AFC held 4 events.

== Events list ==
#	Event title	Date	Arena	Location
12	AFC 11	November 22, 2014	Melbourne Pavilion	Melbourne, Australia
11	AFC 10	August 16, 2014	Bunton Park	North Albury, Australia
10	AFC 9	May 17, 2014	Melbourne Pavilion	Melbourne, Australia
9	AFC 8	February 22, 2014	Melbourne Pavilion	Melbourne, Australia

== AFC 11 ==
AFC 11 was held on November 22, 2014, at Melbourne Pavilion in Melbourne, Australia.

=== Results ===
Main card
Weight class				Method	Round	Time	Notes
Middleweight	Zein Saliba	def.	Maui Tuigamala	Submission (arm-triangle choke)	2	3:20
Middleweight	Kitt Campbell	def.	Chris Birch	Submission (rear-naked choke)	1	0:46
Welterweight	Lance Ettia	def.	James Londrigan	TKO (punches)	1	2:18
N/A	Jason Lonergan	def.	Nick Davis	Decision (split)	3	5:00
N/A	John Beirouti	def.	Chris Lindner	TKO (punches)	2	2:17
Flyweight	Stevie Kelly	def.	Alexandra Muir	Decision (unanimous)	3	5:00
Catchweight	Christian Burghartswieser	def.	Nikos Trepca	Decision (split)	3	5:00	(Note: Catchweight at 150 Ibs)
Bantamweight	Chris Wase	def.	Tim Zosh	Decision (split)	3	5:00

== AFC 10 ==
AFC 10 was held on August 16, 2014, at Bunton Park in North Albury, Australia.

=== Results ===
Main card
Weight class				Method	Round	Time	Notes
Lightweight	Bernardo Magalhaes	def.	Kieran Joblin	Decision (majority)	5	5:00	(Note: For the AFC Lightweight Championship)
N/A	Talgat Llyasov	def.	Amin Yaqubi	Submission (arm-triangle choke)	2	1:36
Middleweight	Daniel Way	def.	Joe Muir	TKO (doctor stoppage)	3	N/A
Welterweight	Peter Davenport	def.	Luis Dabu	Submission (heel hook)	1	3:57
Welterweight	Mitch O'Dowd	def.	Brent Masterman	Submission (armbar)	1	1:45
N/A	Nick Davis	def.	Chris Lindner	TKO	1	4:25
Welterweight	Alex Anthony	def.	Nikos Trepca	Technical Submission (armbar)	1	3:34
Welterweight	Luke Catubig	def.	James Londrigan	KO (punch)	1	0:10
N/A	Dan Ginnane	def.	Luke Falzon	TKO (punches)	2	4:05

== AFC 9 ==
AFC 9 was held on May 17, 2014, at Melbourne Pavilion in Melbourne, Australia.

=== Results ===
Main card
Weight class				Method	Round	Time	Notes
Welterweight	Corey Nelson	def.	Callan Potter	KO (punches)	1	3:15	(Note: For the AFC Welterweight Championship)
Bantamweight	Gustavo Falciroli	def.	Kai Kara-France	Submission (brabo choke)	1	4:55	(Note: For the AFC Bantamweight Championship)
Middleweight	Steve Kennedy	def.	Daniel Way	Decision (unanimous)	3	5:00
Middleweight	Dan Kelly	def.	Ben Kelleher	Submission (rear-naked choke)	2	3:41
Welterweight	Kael Coster	def.	Peter Davenport	Submission (rear-naked choke)	2	3:41
Featherweight	Alexander Volkanovski	def.	Rodolfo Marques	KO (punch)	1	3:41
Lightweight	Anthony Cowley	def.	James Londrigan	Submission 9triangle choke)	1	N/A

== AFC 8 ==
AFC 8 was an event held in February 2014, at Melbourne Pavilion in Melbourne, Australia.

=== Results ===
Main card
Weight class				Method	Round	Time	Notes
Lightweight	Nick Patterson	def.	Bernardo Magalhaes	Decision (unanimous)	3	5:00
Featherweight	Rodolfo Marques	def.	Dean Purdon	Decision (unanimous)	3	5:00
Middleweight	Corey Nelson	def.	Rick Alchin	TKO (leg kicks)	1	3:09
Bantamweight	Joel Fisher	def.	Aden Baron	TKO (corner stoppage)	2	4:45
N/A	Aldin Bates	def.	Matt McGuiness	TKO (punches)	2	1:18
Middleweight	Daniel Way	def.	Daniel Almeida	KO (knees and punches)	1	1:20
Welterweight	Kael Coster	def.	Scott Noras	Submission (rear-naked choke)	2	1:30
