= 2013 in AFC =

Mixed martial arts events

Information
- First date: May 10, 2013
- Last date: December 14, 2013

Events
- Total events: 3

Fights
- Total fights: 30
- Title fights: 2

Chronology
2012 in AFC	2013 in AFC	2014 in AFC

The year 2013 was the 4th year in the history of Australian Fighting Championship (AFC), a mixed martial arts promotion based in Australia. In 2013 AFC held 3 events.

== Events list ==
#	Event title	Date	Arena	Location
6	AFC 5	May 10, 2013	Melbourne Pavilion	Melbourne, Australia
7	AFC 6	August 24, 2013	Melbourne Pavilion	Melbourne, Australia
8	AFC 7	December 14, 2013	Melbourne Pavilion	Melbourne, Australia

== AFC 7 ==
AFC 7 was held on December 14, 2013, at Melbourne Pavilion in Melbourne, Australia.

=== Results ===
Main card
Weight class				Method	Round	Time	Notes
Middleweight	Steve Kennedy	def.	Manuel Rodriguez	Submission (kimura)	4	0:51	(Note: For the AFC Middleweight Championship)
Welterweight	Peter Davenport	def.	Dean Purdon	Decision (unanimous)	3	5:00
Welterweight	Nick Patterson	def.	Rod Staader	Submission (rear-naked choke)	3	5:00
Bantamweight	Gustavo Falciroli	vs.	Kai Kara-France	No Contest	2	3:20	(Note: Kara-France fell through the ropes of the ring and was unable to continue)
Welterweight	Alexander Volkanovski	def.	Luke Catubig	TKO (punches)	3	4:39
Bantamweight	Charlie Alaniz	def.	Giancarlo Embradora	Decision (unanimous)	3	5:00
Featherweight	Rodolfo Marques	def.	Mark Albelardo	Decision (unanimous)	3	5:00
Lightweight	Jordon Lucas	def.	Adam Corbett	Submission (armbar)	1	2:00
Welterweight	Callan Potter	def.	Troy Resic	TKO (punches)	1	3:40
Middleweight	Chris Birch	def.	David Gibb	Submission (guillotine choke)	1	3:42

== AFC 6 ==
AFC 6 was held on August 24, 2013, at Melbourne Pavilion in Melbourne, Australia.

=== Results ===
Main card
Weight class				Method	Round	Time	Notes
Lightweight	Dan Hooker	def.	Nick Patterson	TKO (punches)	3	0:34	(Note: For the AFC Lightweight Championship)
Featherweight	Rob Lisita	def.	Rodolfo marques	TKO (punches)	2	0:51
Welterweight	Peter Daveport	def.	Shaun Wilcock	KO (punch)	1	0:21
Middleweight	Dan Kelly	def.	Bor Bratovz	KO (punch)	2	1:42
Welterweight	Craig Martin	def.	Mikey Vaotuua	Decision (unanimous)	3	5:00
Welterweight	Corey Nelson	def.	Walber Brito de Barros	TKO (doctor stoppage)	2	4:20
Welterweight	Jake Matthews	def.	Dean Purdon	Submission (rear-naked choke)	2	2:42
Bantamweight	Joel Fisher	def.	Zach Hook	Decision (unanimous)	3	5:00

== AFC 5 ==
AFC 5 was held on May 10, 2013, at Melbourne Pavilion in Melbourne, Australia.

=== Results ===
Main card
Weight class				Method	Round	Time	Notes
Lightweight	Dan Hooker	def.	Rusty McBride	Submission (rear-naked choke)	1	1:31	(Note: For the AFC Lightweight Championship)
Welterweight	Corey Nelson	def.	Alexander Volkanovski	TKO (head kick and punches)	3	0:13
Welterweight	Dean Purdon	def.	Peter Davenport	Submissi0n (rear-naked choke)	1	2:53
Welterweight	Jake Matthews	def.	Luke Jumeau	Submission (rear-naked choke)	2	1:14
Featherweight	Rory O'Connell	def.	Ivo dos Santos	TKO (knee and punches)	2	4:15
Lightweight	Kieran Joblin	def.	Ian james Schaffa	Submission (armbar)	1	3:51
Middleweight	Dan Kelly	def.	Chris Birch	Submission (rear-naked choke)	1	0:23
Middleweight	Bor Bratovz	def.	Rick Alchin	KO (punches)	1	0:23
Middleweight	Vik Grujic	def.	Daniel Way	Decision (unanimous)	3	5:00
Middleweight	Steve Kennedy	def.	Cole Davids	Submission (armbar)	1	4:50
Catchweight	Jordan Lucas	def.	Joel fisher	Decision (unanimous)	3	5:00	(Note: Catchweight bout at 137 Ibs)
Bantamweight	Lana Kate	def.	Amy Adam	TKO (punches)	3	1:41
