= Kai Kara-France =

New Zealand mixed martial artist (born 1993)

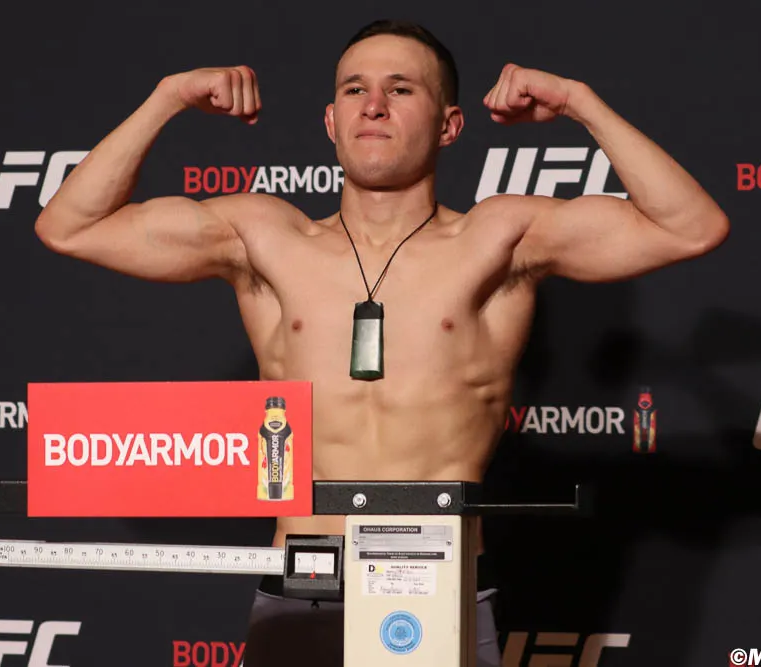
- Kara-France in 2021
- Born: James Kaiwhare Kara-France; 26 March 1993 (age 33); Auckland, New Zealand
- Nickname: Don't Blink
- Height: 5 ft 4 in (1.63 m)
- Weight: 125 lb (57 kg; 8.9 st)
- Division: Flyweight; Bantamweight
- Reach: 69 in (175 cm)
- Fighting out of: Auckland, New Zealand
- Team: Tiger Muay Thai (2012–2016); City Kickboxing (2016–present)
- Rank: Blue belt in Brazilian Jiu-Jitsu
- Years active: 2010–present

Mixed martial arts record
- Total: 38
- Wins: 25
- By knockout: 12
- By submission: 3
- By decision: 10
- Losses: 12
- By knockout: 3
- By submission: 4
- By decision: 5
- No contests: 1

Other information
- Mixed martial arts record from Sherdog

James Kaiwhare "Kai" Kara-France (born 26 March 1993) is a New Zealand professional mixed martial artist. He currently competes in the flyweight division of the Ultimate Fighting Championship (UFC), where he was a UFC flyweight title challenger.

== Background ==
Kara-France started practicing Brazilian jiu-jitsu at the age of 10 but stopped after two years. After being bullied for his small stature in high school, Mount Albert Grammar School, he started training mixed martial arts as a whole. Kara-France attended Unitec Institute of Technology for a spell, but dropped out. He is of Māori ancestry.

== Mixed martial arts career ==
=== Early career ===
In November 2010, Kara-France began his professional MMA career in his home city of Auckland, with a first-round TKO win over Ray Karaitiana.

Kara-France decided to drop out of the university after seeing a Facebook post promoting Tiger Muay Thai gym scholarship. He applied to the gym and was awarded the scholarship after competing in the try-outs. He moved to Phuket, Thailand, in 2013 where he trained and built his mixed martial arts record by fighting around Asia and The Pacific.

=== The Ultimate Fighter ===
In 2016, Kara-France competed in The Ultimate Fighter: Tournament of Champions - the 24th edition of the UFC-produced reality television series The Ultimate Fighter. He won his first fight with a 30-second KO win over Terrence Mitchell. His second and final fight in this tournament was in the quarterfinals, where he lost by decision to Alexandre Pantoja.

=== Ultimate Fighting Championship ===
Kara-France was signed by the UFC in July 2018 and he made his UFC debut on 1 December 2018, at UFC Fight Night: dos Santos vs. Tuivasa against Ashkan Mokhtarian. However, on 21 November 2018, Mokhtarian was pulled from the fight, citing an injury, and he was replaced by Elias Garcia. After both fighters getting knocked down, Kara-France won the fight via unanimous decision. Both fighters were awarded US$50,000 Fight of the Night bonuses.

Two months later, Kara-France faced Raulian Paiva on 10 February 2019, at UFC 234. He won the fight via split decision.

Kara-France faced Mark De La Rosa on 31 August 2019, at UFC Fight Night: Andrade vs. Zhang. He won the fight via unanimous decision.

Kara-France was briefly linked to a bout against Sergio Pettis on 14 December 2019, at UFC 245. However, in early October, Pettis revealed that he was entertaining offers from other promotions after the completion of his previous contract and did not currently have a fight lined up with the promotion. Kara-France instead faced Brandon Moreno. He lost the fight by unanimous decision.

Kara-France faced Tyson Nam on 23 February 2020, at UFC Fight Night 168. He won the fight via unanimous decision.

Kara-France was expected to face Alex Perez on 16 May 2020. However, on 9 April, Dana White, the president of UFC, announced that the event had been postponed to a future date due to COVID-19 pandemic.

Kara-France faced Brandon Royval on 27 September 2020 at UFC 253. After both fighters were knocked down in the first round, Kara-France lost the fight via submission in the second round. This fight earned him the Fight of the Night award.

As the first bout of his new four-fight contract, Kara-France faced Rogério Bontorin on 6 March 2021, at UFC 259. He won the fight via knockout in round one. This fight earned him the Performance of the Night award.

Kara-France next faced former UFC Bantamweight Champion Cody Garbrandt on 11 December 2021, at UFC 269. He won the fight via TKO in the first round. The win also earned Kara-France his second consecutive Performance of the Night bonus award.

Kara-France faced Askar Askarov on 26 March 2022, at UFC on ESPN 33. He spoiled Askarov's undefeated record, handing him his first loss via unanimous decision.

Kara-France faced former flyweight champion Brandon Moreno in a rematch on 30 July 2022, with the interim UFC Flyweight Championship on the line, at UFC 277. He lost the fight via TKO in the third round. The bout earned him his fourth Fight of the Night award.

Kara-France was scheduled to face Alex Perez on 12 February 2023, at UFC 284. However, Kara-France was pulled out of the fight, citing a knee injury.

Kara-France faced Amir Albazi on 3 June 2023, at UFC on ESPN 46. He lost the fight via a highly controversial split decision. 19 out of 21 media outlets scored the bout in favor of Kara-France.

Kara-France was scheduled to face Manel Kape on 10 September 2023, at UFC 293. However Kara-France pulled out of the fight in late August after suffering a concussion during training, and was replaced by Felipe dos Santos.

Kara-France faced former UFC Flyweight Championship challenger Steve Erceg on 18 August 2024, at UFC 305. He won the fight by technical knockout in the first round. This fight earned him another Performance of the Night award.

Kara-France was reportedly scheduled to face Alexandre Pantoja for the UFC Flyweight Championship on 12 April 2025, at UFC 314. However, for unknown reasons, the bout was reportedly moved to 7 June 2025 at UFC 316 but never came to fruition. The bout was rescheduled and took place on 28 June 2025 at UFC 317. Kara-France lost the fight via a rear-naked choke submission in the third round.

On 18 November 2025, it was reported that Kara-France was removed from the UFC rankings after announcing a year-long hiatus from competition to focus on personal matters.

== Personal life ==
Kara-France and his wife Chardae have a son.

== Championships and accomplishments ==
=== Mixed martial arts ===
- Ultimate Fighting Championships
  - Fight of the Night (Three times) vs. Elias Garcia, Brandon Moreno 2, and Brandon Royval
  - Performance of the Night (Three times) vs. Rogério Bontorin, Cody Garbrandt, and Steve Erceg
    - Fifth most Post-Fight bonuses in UFC Flyweight division history (6)
  - Tied (Manel Kape & Joshua Van) for second most knockdowns landed in UFC Flyweight division history (8) (behind Deiveson Figueiredo)
  - Third highest takedown defense percentage in UFC Flyweight division history (88.0%)
  - UFC.com Awards
    - 2022: Ranked #4 Upset of the Year vs. Askar Askarov

== Mixed martial arts record ==
Professional record breakdown
38 matches	25 wins	12 losses
By knockout	12	3
By submission	3	4
By decision	10	5
No contests	1	

Res.	Record	Opponent	Method	Event	Date	Round	Time	Location	Notes
Loss	25–12 (1)	Alexandre Pantoja	Submission (rear-naked choke)	UFC 317	28 June 2025	3	1:54	Las Vegas, Nevada, United States	For the UFC Flyweight Championship.
Win	25–11 (1)	Steve Erceg	TKO (punches)	UFC 305	18 August 2024	1	4:04	Perth, Australia	Performance of the Night.
Loss	24–11 (1)	Amir Albazi	Decision (split)	UFC on ESPN: Kara-France vs. Albazi	3 June 2023	5	5:00	Las Vegas, Nevada, United States	
Loss	24–10 (1)	Brandon Moreno	TKO (body kick and punches)	UFC 277	30 July 2022	3	4:34	Dallas, Texas, United States	For the interim UFC Flyweight Championship. Fight of the Night.
Win	24–9 (1)	Askar Askarov	Decision (unanimous)	UFC on ESPN: Blaydes vs. Daukaus	26 March 2022	3	5:00	Columbus, Ohio, United States	
Win	23–9 (1)	Cody Garbrandt	TKO (punches)	UFC 269	11 December 2021	1	3:21	Las Vegas, Nevada, United States	Performance of the Night.
Win	22–9 (1)	Rogério Bontorin	KO (punches)	UFC 259	6 March 2021	1	4:55	Las Vegas, Nevada, United States	Performance of the Night.
Loss	21–9 (1)	Brandon Royval	Submission (guillotine choke)	UFC 253	27 September 2020	2	0:48	Abu Dhabi, United Arab Emirates	Fight of the Night.
Win	21–8 (1)	Tyson Nam	Decision (unanimous)	UFC Fight Night: Felder vs. Hooker	23 February 2020	3	5:00	Auckland, New Zealand	
Loss	20–8 (1)	Brandon Moreno	Decision (unanimous)	UFC 245	14 December 2019	3	5:00	Las Vegas, Nevada, United States	
Win	20–7 (1)	Mark De La Rosa	Decision (unanimous)	UFC Fight Night: Andrade vs. Zhang	31 August 2019	3	5:00	Shenzhen, China	
Win	19–7 (1)	Raulian Paiva	Decision (split)	UFC 234	10 February 2019	3	5:00	Melbourne, Australia	
Win	18–7 (1)	Elias Garcia	Decision (unanimous)	UFC Fight Night: dos Santos vs. Tuivasa	2 December 2018	3	5:00	Adelaide, Australia	Return to Flyweight. Fight of the Night.
Win	17–7 (1)	Shi Xiaoyu	Submission (rear-naked choke)	Glory of Heroes: New Zealand vs. China	4 March 2018	1	N/A	Auckland, New Zealand	
Win	16–7 (1)	Huoyixibai Chuhayifu	Decision (unanimous)	WLF W.A.R.S. 19	11 November 2017	3	5:00	Zhengzhou, China	
Win	15–7 (1)	Aori Qileng	Decision (unanimous)	WLF W.A.R.S. 14	20 May 2017	3	5:00	Zhengzhou, China	Catchweight (129 lb) bout.
Win	14–7 (1)	Wu Ze	TKO (punches)	WLF W.A.R.S. 13	22 April 2017	1	2:01	Zhengzhou, China	
Win	13–7 (1)	Rodolfo Marques	KO (punch)	Hex Fight Series 8	31 March 2017	3	2:59	Melbourne, Australia	Return to Bantamweight.
Loss	12–7 (1)	Tatsumitsu Wada	Decision (unanimous)	Rizin World Grand Prix 2016: 2nd Round	29 December 2016	3	5:00	Saitama, Japan	
Win	12–6 (1)	Crisanto Pitpitunge	TKO (cartwheel kick and punches)	Pacific Xtreme Combat 52	18 March 2016	3	N/A	Mangilao, Guam	
Win	11–6 (1)	Josh Duenas	TKO (punches)	Pacific Xtreme Combat 50	4 December 2015	1	0:22	Mangilao, Guam	
Win	10–6 (1)	Shantaram Maharaj	TKO (punches)	Bragging Rights 7	27 September 2015	1	1:33	Perth, Australia	Won the KOZ Flyweight Championship.
Win	9–6 (1)	Dindo Camansa	KO (punches)	Malaysian Invasion: Mixed Martial A'rr	1 June 2015	1	0:12	Andaman Sea, Thailand	Flyweight debut.
Win	8–6 (1)	Jang Ik-hwan	TKO (punches)	PRO Fighting 10	9 May 2015	1	0:08	Taipei, Taiwan	
Loss	7–6 (1)	Ayideng Jumayi	Decision (unanimous)	Kunlun Fight 18	18 January 2015	3	5:00	Nanjing, China	
Loss	7–5 (1)	Mark Striegl	Submission (rear-naked choke)	Malaysian Invasion 2: Grand Finals	25 October 2014	1	2:10	Kuala Lumpur, Malaysia	
Loss	7–4 (1)	Gustavo Falciroli	Submission (brabo choke)	Australian FC 9	17 May 2014	1	4:55	Melbourne, Australia	For the AFC Bantamweight Championship.
Win	7–3 (1)	Wu Tieyin	Decision (unanimous)	Kunlun Fight 1	25 January 2014	3	5:00	Pattaya, Thailand	
NC	6–3 (1)	Gustavo Falciroli	No Contest (Kara-France fell out of the ring)	Australian FC 7	14 December 2013	2	3:20	Melbourne, Australia	Kara-France fell through the ropes of the ring and was unable to continue
Win	6–3	Wu Tieyin	Submission (guillotine choke)	World Team USA: Fight for Peace	23 October 2013	1	1:54	Manila, Philippines	
Win	5–3	Yudi Cahyadi	Decision (unanimous)	Bandung Fighting Club 1	29 September 2013	3	5:00	Bandung, Indonesia	
Win	4–3	Kim Ho-joon	KO (head kick)	PRO Fighting 8	4 August 2013	1	3:44	Taipei, Taiwan	
Loss	3–3	Danaa Batgerel	Decision (unanimous)	Legend FC 11	27 April 2013	3	5:00	Kuala Lumpur, Malaysia	
Win	3–2	Caleb Lally	Decision (unanimous)	Rage in the Cage	13 October 2012	3	5:00	Tauranga, New Zealand	
Win	2–2	Sam Chan	Submission (guillotine choke)	Legend FC 10	24 August 2012	1	3:21	Hong Kong, SAR, China	
Loss	1–2	Agustin Delarmino	KO (punches)	Legend FC 8	30 March 2012	3	0:29	Hong Kong, SAR, China	
Loss	1–1	Chad George	KO (punch)	The Cage 2	2 December 2011	1	2:04	Whakatāne, New Zealand	
Win	1–0	Ray Kaitiana	TKO (punches)	Supremacy Cage Fighting 7	27 November 2010	1	N/A	Auckland, New Zealand	Bantamweight debut.

=== Mixed martial arts exhibition record ===
Exhibition record breakdown		
2 matches	1 win	1 loss
By knockout	1	0
By decision	0	1

Res.	Record	Opponent	Method	Event	Date	Round	Time	Location	Notes
Loss	1–1	Alexandre Pantoja	Decision (unanimous)	The Ultimate Fighter: Tournament of Champions	2 November 2016	2	5:00	Las Vegas, Nevada, United States	TUF 24 Quarter-final round
Win	1–0	Terrence Mitchell	KO (punch)	The Ultimate Fighter: Tournament of Champions	31 August 2016	1	0:30	Las Vegas, Nevada, United States	TUF 24 Round of 16

*Date given is the air date of the episode. The actual dates of the fight are not released by the UFC

== See also ==
- List of current UFC fighters
- List of male mixed martial artists
