= UFC 305 =

2024 mixed martial event in Perth, Australia

UFC 305: du Plessis vs. Adesanya
- The poster for UFC 305: du Plessis vs. Adesanya
- Promotion: Ultimate Fighting Championship
- Date: 18 August 2024
- Venue: RAC Arena
- City: Perth, Australia
- Attendance: 14,152
- Total gate: $5,477,097

Event chronology
UFC on ESPN: Tybura vs. Spivac 2	UFC 305: du Plessis vs. Adesanya	UFC on ESPN: Cannonier vs. Borralho

UFC 305: du Plessis vs. Adesanya was a mixed martial arts event produced by the Ultimate Fighting Championship that took place on 18 August 2024, at the RAC Arena in Perth, Australia.

== Background ==
The event marked the promotion's third visit to Perth and first since UFC 284 in February 2023, as well as the beginning of a multiyear deal for twice-annual events in the city.

A UFC Middleweight Championship bout between current champion (also former KSW Welterweight Champion) Dricus du Plessis and former two-time champion Israel Adesanya headlined the event. It marked the first time two African-born athletes met for a title in the organization.

A featherweight bout between Gavin Tucker and Jack Jenkins was scheduled for this event. However, Tucker withdrew from the fight due to injury and was replaced by Herbert Burns.

A women's flyweight bout between Casey O'Neill and Tereza Bledá was scheduled for this event. However, Bledá withdrew from the fight for unknown reasons and was replaced by Luana Santos.

At the weigh-ins, Jesús Santos Aguilar weighed in at 127.5 pounds, one and a half pounds over the flyweight non-title fight limit. The bout proceeded at catchweight and Aguilar was fined 20 percent of his purse, which went to his opponent Stewart Nicoll.

== Results ==
Main card
Weight class				Method	Round	Time	Notes
Middleweight	Dricus du Plessis (c)	def.	Israel Adesanya	Submission (face crank)	4	3:38	(Note: For the UFC Middleweight Championship.)
Flyweight	Kai Kara-France	def.	Steve Erceg	TKO (punches)	1	4:04
Lightweight	Dan Hooker	def.	Mateusz Gamrot	Decision (split) (28–29, 29–28, 29–28)	3	5:00
Heavyweight	Jairzinho Rozenstruik	def.	Tai Tuivasa	Decision (split) (29–28, 27–30, 30–27)	3	5:00
Welterweight	Carlos Prates	def.	Li Jingliang	KO (punches)	2	4:02
Preliminary card (ESPN2 / ESPN+)
Heavyweight	Valter Walker	def.	Junior Tafa	Submission (heel hook)	1	4:56
Featherweight	Ricardo Ramos	def.	Joshua Culibao	Decision (split) (29–28, 28–29, 29–28)	3	5:00
Women's Flyweight	Casey O'Neill	def.	Luana Santos	Decision (unanimous) (30–27, 30–27, 30–26)	3	5:00
Featherweight	Jack Jenkins	def.	Herbert Burns	TKO (retirement)	3	0:48
Early preliminary card (ESPN+ / UFC Fight Pass)
Lightweight	Tom Nolan	def.	Alex Reyes	Decision (unanimous) (30–27, 30–27, 29–28)	3	5:00
Welterweight	Song Kenan	def.	Ricky Glenn	Decision (unanimous) (30–27, 30–26, 29–28)	3	5:00
Catchweight (127.5 lb)	Jesús Santos Aguilar	def.	Stewart Nicoll	Technical Submission (guillotine choke)	1	2:39

== Bonus awards ==
The following fighters received $50,000 bonuses.

- Fight of the Night: Dan Hooker vs. Mateusz Gamrot
- Performance of the Night: Kai Kara-France and Carlos Prates

== See also ==
- 2024 in UFC
- List of current UFC fighters
- List of UFC events
- Mixed Martial Arts in Australia
