= 2016 in AFC =

Mixed martial arts events

Information
- First date: March 19, 2016
- Last date: October 15, 2016

Events
- Total events: 3

Fights
- Total fights: 30
- Title fights: 4

Chronology
2015 in AFC	2016 in AFC	2017 in AFC

The year 2016 was the 7th year in the history of Australian Fighting Championship (AFC), a mixed martial arts promotion based in Australia. In 2016 AFC held 3 events.

== Events list ==
#	Event title	Date	Arena	Location
18	AFC 17	October 15, 2016	Melbourne Pavilion	Melbourne, Australia
17	AFC 16	June 18, 2016	Melbourne Pavilion	Melbourne, Australia
16	AFC 15	March 19, 2016	Melbourne Pavilion	Melbourne, Australia

== AFC 17 ==
AFC 17 was held on October 15, 2016, at Melbourne Pavilion in Melbourne, Australia.

=== Results ===
Main card
Weight class				Method	Round	Time	Notes
Heavyweight	Tai Tuivasa	def.	James McSweeney	TKO (corner stoppage)	1	5:00	(Note: For the AFC Heavyweight Championship)
Lightweight	Rob Hill	def.	Ben Wall	Decision (unanimous)	3	5:00
Lightweight	James Bishop	def.	Gokhan Turkyilmaz	TKO (knee and punches)	1	2:27
Light Heavyweight	Tyson Pedro	def.	Steven Warby	Submission (rear-naked choke)	1	3:05
Welterweight	William Namoa	def.	Peter Devenport	Decision (unanimous)	3	5:00
Bantamweight	Marko Orlovic	def.	Ramen Habib	Decision (split)	3	5:00
Lightweight	Mikey Vaotuua	def.	Dane Beebe	Decision (unanimous)	3	5:00
Bantamweight	Chris Wase	def.	Shane Parker	Submission (kimura)	2	3:50
Middleweight	Daniel Schuardt	def.	Sebastian	Decision (unanimous)	3	5:00
Middleweight	John Mitchell	def.	Kevin Bentley	TKO (punches)	2	2:26
N/A	Jun Zhu	def.	Harlem Ottaway	Submission (rear-naked choke)	1	2:05
Bantamweight	Kairin Moses	def.	Joshua Riley	TKO (punches)	2	3:04

== AFC 16 ==
AFC 16 was held on June 18, 2016, at Melbourne Pavilion in Melbourne, Australia.

=== Results ===
Main card
Weight class				Method	Round	Time	Notes
Heavyweight	Tai Tuivasa	def.	Brandon Sosoli	KO (elbow)	1	0:21	(Note: For the AFC Heavyweight Championship)
Lightweight	Issac Hardman	def.	Kaan Ofli	Decision (unanimous)	3	5:00
Lightweight	James McGlasham	def.	Mikey Vaotuua	Submission (guillotine choke)	1	2:56
Lightweight	Nikos Trepca	def.	Tim Zosh	Decision (uananimous)	3	5:00
Middleweight	John Beirouti	def.	Chris Lindner	TKO (punches)	1	2:51
Wleterweight	Dave Fowler	def.	Tony Dib	TKO (head kick)	1	4:34
Light Heavyweight	Tyson Pedro	def.	Don Endermann	Submission (rear-naked choke)	1	2:27
Welterweight	Josh Tummers	def.	Nick Davis	Decision (unanimous)	3	5:00

== AFC 15 ==
AFC 15 was held on March 19, 2016, at Melbourne Pavilion in Melbourne, Australia.

=== Results ===
Main card
Weight class				Method	Round	Time	Notes
Middleweight	Rob Wilkinson	def.	Jamie Abdallah	TKO (punches)	3	4:07	(Note: For the AFC Middleweight Championship)
Featherweight	Alexander Volkanovski (c)	def.	Jamie Mullarkey	KO (punch)	1	3:23	(Note: For the AFC Featherweight Championship)
Lightweight	Nikos Trepca	vs.	Kaan Ofli	Draw (majority)	3	5:00
Lightweight	Ben Wall	def.	Matiu thoms	Submission (rear-naked choke)	3	3:37
Lightweight	Gokhan turkilmaz	def.	Mikey Vaotuua	Decision (unanimous)	3	5:00
Lightweight	Rob Hill	def.	Steven Maxwell	Submission (rear-naked choke)	1	2:53
Lightweight	James Bishop	def.	James McGlasham	TKO (punches)	3	3:51
Welterweight	Tony Dib	def.	Chad Price	Submission (armbar)	1	1:49
Bantamweight	Chris Wase	def.	Ivo dos Santos	Decision (unanimous)	3	5:00
Bantamweight	Joshua Riley	def.	Jason Petropoulos	TKO (punches)	1	1:23
