= 2015 in AFC =

Mixed martial arts events

Information
- First date: March 22, 2015
- Last date: September 12, 2015

Events
- Total events: 3

Fights
- Total fights: 35
- Title fights: 6

Chronology
2014 in AFC	2015 in AFC	2016 in AFC

The year 2015 was the 6th year in the history of Australian Fighting Championship (AFC), a mixed martial arts promotion based in Australia. In 2015 AFC held 3 events.

== Events list ==
#	Event title	Date	Arena	Location
15	AFC 14	September 12, 2015	Melbourne Pavilion	Melbourne, Australia
14	AFC 13	June 14, 2015	Melbourne Pavilion	Melbourne, Australia
13	AFC 12	March 22, 2015	Melbourne Pavilion	Melbourne, Australia

== AFC 14 ==
AFC 14 was held on September 12, 2015, at Melbourne Pavilion in Melbourne, Australia.

=== Results ===
Main card
Weight class				Method	Round	Time	Notes
Light Heavyweight	Jamie Abdallah	def.	Randall Rayment	TKO (punches)	3	2:31	(Note: For the AFC Light Heavyweight Championship)
Welterweight	Manuel Rodriguez	def.	Corey Nelson	Submission (guillotine choke)	2	4:43	(Note: For the AFC Welterweight Championship)
Middleweight	Stuart Dare	def.	Kitt Campbell	Submission (guillotine choke)	2	4:43
Welterweight	Lance Ettia	def.	Kitt Campbell	Decision (split)	3	5:00
Middleweight	Rob Wilkinson	def.	Daniel Schuardt	Submission (guillotine choke)	1	3:28
Bantamweight	Ivo dos Santos	def.	Michael Barber	Submission (arm-triangle choke)	2	1:51
Lightweight	Kaan Ofli	def.	Bayden Mandich	Submission (bulldog choke)	1	1:37
Bantamweight	Nikos Trepca	def.	Chris Wase	Decision (unanimous)	3	5:00
Bantamweight	Muhammad Abdou	def.	Ramen Habib	Submission (armbar)	1	0:56
Welterweight	Sam Hayward	def.	Ryan Mills	Decision (split)	3	5:00

== AFC 13 ==
AFC 13 was held on June 14, 2015, at Melbourne Pavilion in Melbourne, Australia.

=== Results ===
Main card
Weight class				Method	Round	Time	Notes
Heavyweight	Brandon Sosoli	def.	Andre Meunier	TKO (punches)	1	1:45	(Note: For the AFC Heavyweight Championship)
Featherweight	Alexander Volkanovski	def.	James Bishop	TKO (punches)	1	1:39	(Note: For the AFC Featherweight Championship)
Welterweight	Kitt Campbell	def.	Shane Mitchell	Decision (unanimous)	3	5:00
Welterweight	Mikey Vaotuua	def.	Peter Davenport	Decision (unanimous)	3	5:00
Middleweight	Brandon Drillich	def.	John Beirouti	Submission (rear-naked choke)	1	2:24
Bantamweight	Darwin Sagurit	def.	Ivo dos Santos	KO (punch)	2	2:27
Featherweight	Regan Neoh	def.	Luke Catubig	Decision (unanimous)	3	5:00
Featherweight	Jamie Mullarkey	def.	Issac Hardman	Submission (arm-tringle choke)	1	N/A
Middleweight	Mitch O'Dowd	def.	Issey Francis Buangala	Submission (armbar)	1	3:44
Bantamweight	Muhammad Abdou	def.	Jason Petropoulos	Decision (split)	3	5:00
Light Heavyweight	Daniel Schuardt	def.	Luke Howard	Submission (kneebar)	1	0:56
Weltwerweight	Sam Hayward	def.	Maseiga Tuala	Submission (rear-naked choke)	1	2:41
Welterweight	Nikos Trepca	def.	Tyler Petee	Decision(unanimous)	3	5:00

== AFC 12 ==
AFC 12 was held on March 22, 2015, at Melbourne Pavilion in Melbourne, Australia.

=== Results ===
Main card
Weight class				Method	Round	Time	Notes
Light Heavyweight	Jamie Abdallah	def.	Daniel Almeida	KO (punch)	1	0:35	(Note: For AFC Light Heavyweight Championship)
Middleweight	Zein Saliba	def.	Daniel Way	Decision (unanimous)	5	5:00	(Note: For AFC Middleweight Championship)
Welterweight	Kitt Campbell	def.	Matt Eland	Submission (armbar)	1	1:30
Welterweight	James Bishop	def.	Peter Davenport	Submission (rear-naked choke)	1	4:22
Welterweight	Lance Ettia	def.	Dan Ginnane	Submission (triangle choke)	1	2:22
Middleweight	John Beirouti	def.	Dean martin	Technical Submission (bulldog choke)	1	3:23
Welterweight	Mikey Vaotuua	def.	Nick Davis	Decision (unanimous)	3	5:00
Bantamweight	Chris Wase	def.	Dylan Wolf	Decision (unanimous)	3	5:00
Lightweight	Kaan Ofli	def.	Christian Burghartswieser	Decision (unanimous)	3	5:00
N/A	Jason Petropoulos	def.	Justin Barbuto	Submission (guillotine choke)	1	0:51
Welterweight	Daniel Schauardt	def.	Issey Francis Buangala	Submission (triangle choke)	1	2:18
N/A	Ryan Mills	def.	Chris Lindner	Submission (guillotine choke)	1	1:25
