= Wes Shivers =

American martial artist (born 1977)

- Born: Wesley Shivers; March 8, 1977 (age 49); Brandon, Mississippi, U.S.
- Other names: The Perfect Storm
- Height: 6 ft 8 in (2.03 m)
- Weight: 265 lb (120 kg; 18.9 st)
- Division: Heavyweight
- Reach: 81.5 in (207 cm)
- Fighting out of: Biloxi, Mississippi
- Team: Freelance
- Years active: 2007–present

Other information
- Mixed martial arts record from Sherdog

Wesley Davis Shivers (born March 8, 1977) is an American professional mixed martial artist. He was a cast member of SpikeTV's The Ultimate Fighter: Heavyweights. Shivers also played in three National Football League (NFL) games with the Atlanta Falcons in 2000. Shivers had a small role in the movie Never Back Down 2: The Beatdown and Universal Soldier: The Reckoning as well as an appearance in the pseudo reality show The Devils Ride as Bobby Slaughter in season 3.

== Football career ==
After he entered high school at Benton Academy, Wes decided that he wanted to devote all of his time to American football. After graduation, Shivers attended a junior college prior to attending Mississippi State University. Shivers played on the football team as an offensive tackle. He was named a Junior College All-American, as well as being on the All-Southeastern Conference team. Shivers was drafted by the Tennessee Titans in the seventh round of the 2000 NFL draft and played three games with Atlanta before being cut. Shivers became a police officer after retiring but retired from that to pursue MMA.

== Mixed martial arts career ==
After picking up 4 stoppage wins in local Mississippi organizations, Shivers spent a good part of 2009 participating in the UFC's The Ultimate Fighter: Heavyweights. In his first fight, he lost a controversial majority decision to eventual semi-finalist James McSweeney.

After more than a year, Shivers returned to action, defeating Goldman Butler at Strikeforce Challengers: Wilcox vs. Ribeiro via KO.

== Mixed martial arts record ==
Professional record breakdown
9 matches	8 wins	1 loss
By knockout	4	1
By submission	4	0

Res.	Record	Opponent	Method	Event	Date	Round	Time	Location	Notes
Win	8–1	Goldman Butler	KO (punch)	Strikeforce Challengers: Wilcox vs. Ribeiro	November 19, 2010	1	2:15	Jackson, Mississippi, United States	
Win	7–1	Jerry Carol	Submission (arm-triangle choke)	Psychout - MMA	March 7, 2009	1	1:49	Jackson, Mississippi, United States	
Loss	6–1	Brad Tidwell	KO (punch)	Fight Force International - Blood and Sand 6	November 22, 2008	2	0:16	Byram, Mississippi, United States	
Win	6–0	Justin Thornton	KO (punch)	Psychout - MMA	September 27, 2008	3	1:16	Byram, Mississippi, United States	
Win	5–0	Christopher Adams	KO (punch)	Fight Force International - Blood and Sand 5	July 26, 2008	1	N/A	Biloxi, Mississippi, United States	
Win	4–0	Carlton Little	Submission (rear-naked choke)	KOTC: Reckless	May 17, 2008	1	1:53	Greenville, Mississippi, United States	
Win	3–0	Greg Maher	KO (punches)	Fight Force International - Blood and Sand 4	April 5, 2008	1	1:42	Biloxi, Mississippi, United States	
Win	2–0	Bo Hooks	TKO (punches)	Fight Force International - Beatdown	October 6, 2007	1	0:10	Hattiesburg, Mississippi, United States	
Win	1–0	James Neely	Submission (guillotine choke)	ShoXC: Elite Challenger Series	August 25, 2007	1	2:22	Vicksburg, Mississippi, United States	

=== Mixed martial arts exhibition record ===
Exhibition record breakdown		
1 match	0 wins	1 loss
By decision	0	1

Res.	Record	Opponent	Method	Event	Date	Round	Time	Location	Notes
Loss	0–1	James McSweeney	Decision (Majority)	The Ultimate Fighter: Heavyweights		2	5:00	Las Vegas, Nevada	Preliminary bout
