= 2010 in AFC =

Mixed martial arts events

Information
- First date: November 12, 2010
- Last date: November 12, 2010

Events
- Total events: 1

Fights
- Total fights: 10

Chronology
2010 in AFC	2011 in AFC

The year 2010 was the 1st year in the history of Australian Fighting Championship (AFC), a mixed martial arts promotion based in Australia. In 2010 AFC held 1 event.

== Events list ==
#	Event title	Date	Arena	Location
1	AFC 1	November 12, 2010	State Netball and Hockey Centre	Melbourne, Australia

== AFC 1 ==
AFC 1 was an event held on November 12, 2010, at State Netball and Hockey Centre in Melbourne, Australia. The event director for the inaugural AFC 1 was Lui Spedaliere a hip hop music tour promoter from Unda K9 Records who was engaged by the AFC founder Adam Milankovic three weeks before the event when only 50 tickets were recorded to be sold by Ticketmaster. Lui bought her Sydney team Kurt Pascoe and Sherri Ponisi, and successfully sold 3,200 tickets in the 3 weeks leading up to the event. The highest number of tickets sold in Australia for an MMA event outside of the UFC. The half-time entertainment was Hip Hop Artist Phrase and DJ Jay Funk who later went on to become the AFC resident DJ for AFC 2 - AFC 8. AFC 1 was also one of the first times an Australian MMA event had engaged international fighters Jesse Taylor, Jeremy May and Ritchie Whitson all of whom had appeared in the UFC reality show, The Ultimate Fighter.

=== Results ===
Main card
Weight class				Method	Round	Time	Notes
	Jesse Taylor	def.	Dylan Andrews	Technical Submission (guillotine choke)	1	2:40
	Jeremy May	def.	Ross Dallow	DQ (illegal Substance)	1	5:00
	Richie Whitson	def.	Masaya Doi	KO (punches)	1	3:23
	Leigh Allwood	def.	Supi Lanumata	KO (punches)	1	N/A
	Panapa Pereira	def.	Ryan carr-Ketu	Submission (rear-naked choke)	3	N/A
	Patrice Empeigne	def.	Troy Williams	Decision (unanimous)	3	3:00
	Rob Giuffrida	def.	Aaron Raffin	Submissi0n (arm-triangle choke)	1	1:50
	Daniel Richardson	def.	Hugh Cameron	decision (unanimous)	3	3:00
	Damien Brown	def.	Kenny Yeung	Decision (unanimous)	3	3:00
	Rusty McBride	def.	Matt Prince	TKO (punches)	1	N/A
