= Australian Fighting Championship =

Australian mixed martial arts (MMA) organisation based in Melbourne

- Type: Private
- Industry: Mixed martial arts promotion
- Founded: 2010
- Founder: Adam Milankovic
- Headquarters: Australia
- Key people: Kelly Seif, Shaun McIntyre
- Website: http://afcmma.com.au/

Australian Fighting Championship (AFC) was an Australian mixed martial arts (MMA) organisation based in Melbourne. In 2013, AFC was described as Australia's leading MMA organisation by MMA Kanvas and was part of Sherdog's list of top 50 global MMA organisations (2014). Since AFC 4, all events were successfully streamed live via pay-per-view.

AFC was the second-ranked Australasian promotion in 2013 according to MMA media outlet Fight Sport Asia. AFC CEO Adam Milankovic has had multiple media appearances promoting the sport of MMA to the public. AFC has showcased the talents of elite Australian and New Zealand mixed martial artists alongside international talent. 2017 saw the expansion of the promotion into Mainland China and a major rebranding to the Australasian Fighting Championship (AFC).

== Cage ban ==
The 2008 "cage ban" in Victoria meant MMA competitions, while legal, had to be conducted inside a boxing ring and not a purpose built cage (with the exception of AFC 9 in Albury, New South Wales). In the Victorian State election in November 2014, The Victorian branch of the Labor Party campaigned to revoke the cage ban. With success in the election the ban is set to be repealed allowing AFC to promote MMA in a caged enclosure to ensure optimum safety of fighters.

== Final champions ==
Division	Upper weight limit	Champion	Since	Title defenses
Heavyweight	265 lb (120 kg; 18.9 st)	(Australia) Tai Tuivasa	15 October 2016	0
Light Heavyweight	205 lb (93 kg; 14.6 st)	(Cameroon) Rameau Sokoudjou	28 October 2017	0
Middleweight	185 lb (84 kg; 13.2 st)	(Finland) Glenn Sparv	7 April 2018	0
Welterweight	170 lb (77 kg; 12 st)	(Australia) Theo Christakos	7 April 2018	1
Lightweight	155 lb (70 kg; 11.1 st)	(Australia) Blake Donnelly	1 December 2019	0
Featherweight	145 lb (66 kg; 10.4 st)	(Australia) Alexander Volkanovski	19 March 2016	0
Bantamweight	135 lb (61 kg; 9.6 st)	(Brazil) Gustavo Falciroli	17 May 2014	0

== Australian Fighting Championship Title history ==
=== Australian Fighting Championship Heavyweight Championship ===
Weight limit: 120 kg (264.6 lb)

No.	Name	Event	Date	Defenses
1	(Australia) Soa Palelei def. Joe Kielur	AFC 3 Geelong, Australia	14 April 2012	1. def. Sean McCorkle at AFC 4 on 7 December 2012
Palelei vacated the title when he left AFC for the UFC.
2	(Australia) Brandon Sosoli def. Andre Meunier	AFC 13; Melbourne, Australia	14 June 2015	
3	(Australia) Tai Tuivasa	AFC 16; Melbourne, Australia	18 June 2016	1. def. James McSweeney at AFC 16 on 15 October 2016
Tuivasa vacated the title when he left AFC for the UFC.

=== Australian Fighting Championship Light Heavyweight Championship ===
Weight limit: 93 kg (205.0 lb)

No.	Name	Event	Date	Defenses
1	(Australia) Jamie Abdallah def. Daniel Almeida	AFC 12; Melbourne, Australia	22 March 2015	1. def. Randall Rayment at AFC 14 on 12 September 2015
2	(Cameroon) Rameau Sokoudjou	AFC 21; Melbourne, Australia	28 October 2017	

=== Australian Fighting Championship Middleweight Championship ===
Weight limit: 84 kg (185.2 lb)

No.	Name	Event	Date	Defenses
1	(Australia) Steven Kennedy def. Manuel Rodriguez	AFC 7 Melbourne, Australia	14 December 2013	
Kennedy vacated the title.
2	(Australia) Zein Saliba def. Daniel Way	AFC 12; Melbourne, Australia	22 March 2015	
Saliba vacated the title.
3	(Australia) Rob Wilkinson def. Jamie Abdallah	AFC 15; Melbourne, Australia	19 March 2016	
Wilkinson vacated the title when he left AFC for the UFC.
4	(Nigeria) Israel Adesanya def. Melvin Guillard	AFC 20; Melbourne, Australia	28 July 2017	
Adesanya vacated the title when he left AFC for the UFC.
5	(Finland) Glenn Sparv def. Stu Dare	AFC 22; Melbourne, Australia	7 April 2018	

=== Australian Fighting Championship Welterweight Championship ===
Weight limit: 77 kg (169.8 lb)

No.	Name	Event	Date	Defenses
1	(Australia) Corey Nelson def. Callan Potter	AFC 9 Melbourne, Australia	17 May 2014	
2	(El Salvador) Manuel Rodriguez	AFC 14; Melbourne, Australia	12 September 2015	
Rodriquez vacated the title after suffering an early first round loss to 24-year-old Jacob Stephen Lee, securing Jacob’s 4th championship victory 2 Feb 2016.
3	(Australia) Barry O'Meara def. Anton Zafir 22 Dec 2016	AFC 22; Gold Coast, Australia	2 February 2016 – 7 May 2019	1. def. Jennys Box by way of knock out in the first second of the first round during AFC 5 on 10 May 2017; 2. def. Greg Goodchild by way of technical knock out to end. this flattened Gregs nose AFC 6 on 24 August 2018

=== Australian Fighting Championship Lightweight Championship ===
Weight limit: 70 kg (154.3 lb)

No.	Name	Event	Date	Defenses
1	(New Zealand) Dan Hooker def. Rusty McBride	AFC 3 Geelong, Australia	14 April 2012	1. def. Rusty McBride at AFC 5 on 10 May 2013; 2. def. Nick Patterson at AFC 6 on 24 August 2013
Hooker vacated the title when he signed with the UFC.
2	(Brazil) Bernardo Magalhaes def. Kieran Joblin	AFC 10; Albury-Wodonga, Australia	16 August 2014	
Magalhaes vacated the title.
3	(Australia) Issac Hardman def. James Bishop	AFC 19; Shaanxi, China	15 April 2017	1. def. Rob Hill at AFC 21 on 28 October 2017

=== Australian Fighting Championship Featherweight Championship ===
Weight limit: 66 kg (145.5 lb)

No.	Name	Event	Date	Defenses
1	(Australia) Alexander Volkanovski def. James Bishop	AFC 13; Melbourne, Australia	14 June 2015	1. def. Jamie Mullarkey at AFC 15 on 15 August 2016
Volkanovski vacated the title when he signed with the UFC.

=== Australian Fighting Championship Bantamweight Championship ===
Weight limit: 62 kg (136.7 lb)

No.	Name	Event	Date	Defenses
1	(Brazil) Gustavo Falciroli def. Kai Kara-France	AFC 9 Melbourne, Australia	17 May 2014	

== Scheduled events ==
#	Event Title	Date	Arena	Location

== Past events ==
#	Event Title	Date	Arena	Location
23	AFC 23	1 December 2019	Melbourne Pavilion	Melbourne, Australia
22	AFC 22	7 April 2018	Melbourne Pavilion	Melbourne, Australia
22	AFC 21	28 October 2017	Melbourne Pavilion	Melbourne, Australia
21	AFC 20	28 July 2017	Melbourne Pavilion	Melbourne, Australia
20	AFC 19	15 April 2017	AFC Arena	Xi'an, Shaanxi, China
19	AFC 18	14 April 2017	AFC Arena	Xi'an, Shaanxi, China
18	AFC 17	15 October 2016	Melbourne Pavilion	Melbourne, Australia
17	AFC 16	18 June 2016	Melbourne Pavilion	Melbourne, Australia
16	AFC 15	19 March 2016	Melbourne Pavilion	Melbourne, Australia
15	AFC 14	12 September 2015	Melbourne Pavilion	Melbourne, Australia
14	AFC 13	14 June 2015	Melbourne Pavilion	Melbourne, Australia
13	AFC 12	22 March 2015	Melbourne Pavilion	Melbourne, Australia
12	AFC 11	22 November 2014	Melbourne Pavilion	Melbourne, Australia
11	AFC 10	16 August 2014	Bunton Park	Albury, Australia
10	AFC 9	17 May 2014	Melbourne Pavilion	Melbourne, Australia
9	AFC 8	22 February 2014	Melbourne Pavilion	Melbourne, Australia
8	AFC 7	10 May 2013	Melbourne Pavilion	Melbourne, Australia
7	AFC 6	24 August 2013	Melbourne Pavilion	Melbourne, Australia
6	AFC 5	14 December 2013	Melbourne Pavilion	Melbourne, Australia
5	AFC 4	7 December 2012	Melbourne Pavilion	Melbourne, Australia
4	AFC 3	14 April 2012	Geelong Arena	Geelong, Australia
3	AFC 2	3 September 2011	Melbourne Sports & Aquatic Centre	Melbourne, Australia
2	AFC Fight Night	25 June 2011	State Netball & Hockey Centre	Melbourne, Australia
1	AFC 1	12 November 2010	State Netball & Hockey Centre	Melbourne, Australia

== Notable alumni ==
- Israel Adesanya (UFC)
- Hector Lombard (UFC)
- Soa Palelei (UFC)
- Dylan Andrews (UFC)
- Richie Vaculik (UFC)
- Peter Graham (Bellator)
- Bec Rawlings (UFC)
- Dan Kelly (UFC)
- Jake Matthews (UFC)
- Dan Hooker (UFC)
- Damien Brown (UFC)
- Alexander Volkanovski (UFC)
- Tai Tuivasa (UFC)
- Luke Jumeau (UFC)
- Tyson Pedro (UFC)
