= James McSweeney =

English kickboxer and mixed martial artist

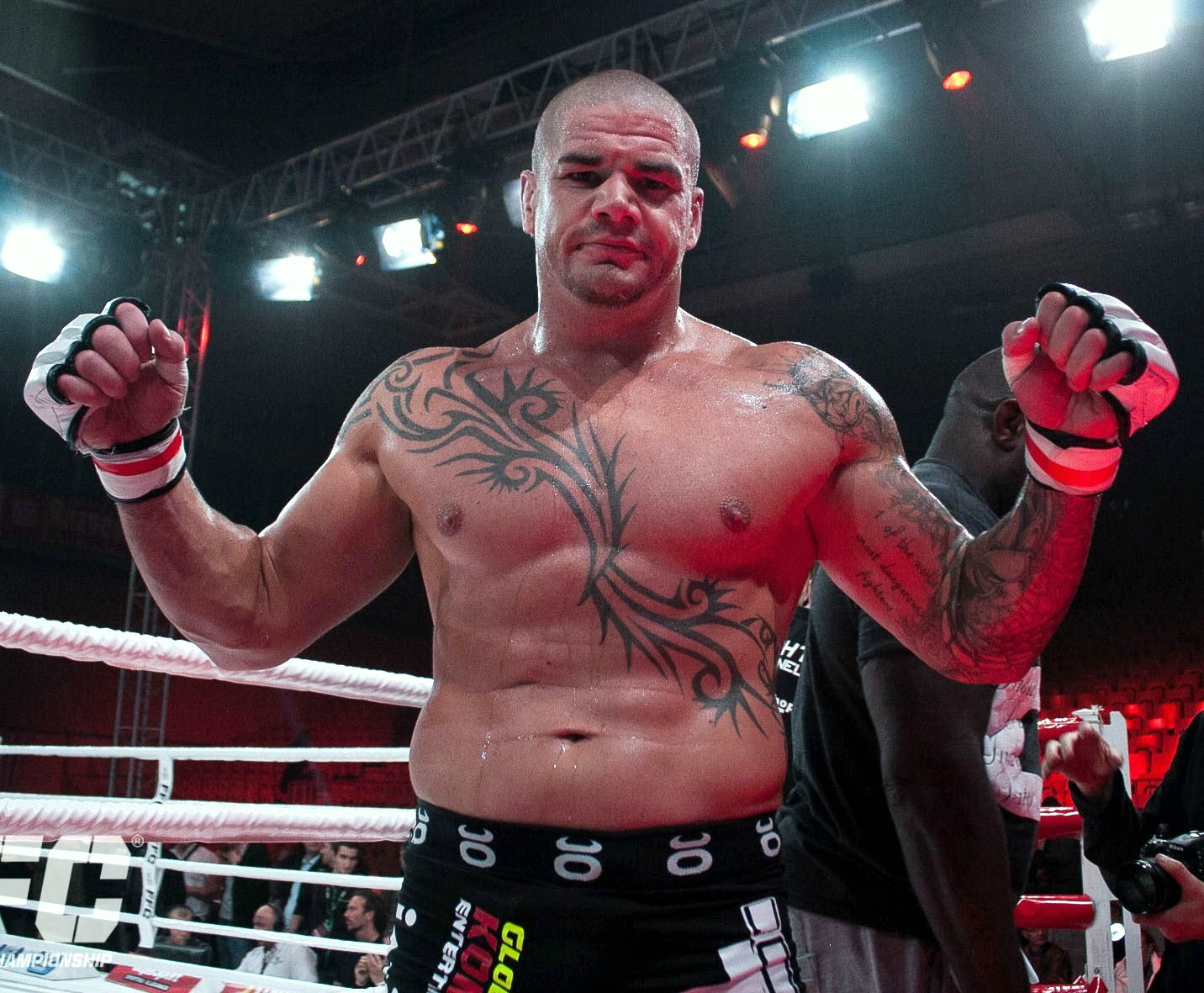
- Born: 24 October 1980 (age 45); London, England
- Other names: The Hammer
- Height: 6 ft 4 in (1.93 m)
- Weight: 251 lb (114 kg; 17 st 13 lb)
- Division: Heavyweight; Light Heavyweight
- Reach: 77 in (200 cm)
- Style: Dutch Kickboxing
- Fighting out of: Plano, Texas, United States
- Team: McSweeney Martial Arts
- Trainer: Valentijn Overeem
- Rank: Black belt in Brazilian jiu-jitsu
- Years active: 2005–2008, 2018–2022 (kickboxing); 2008–2021 (MMA)

Kickboxing record
- Total: 55
- Wins: 47
- By knockout: 31
- Losses: 8
- By knockout: 4

Mixed martial arts record
- Total: 33
- Wins: 15
- By knockout: 9
- By submission: 6
- Losses: 18
- By knockout: 11
- By submission: 4
- By decision: 3

Other information
- Mixed martial arts record from Sherdog
- Last updated on: 12 December 2022

James McSweeney (born 24 October 1980) is a British retired kickboxer and mixed martial artist. A professional since 2005, McSweeney is best known for being a cast member of Spike TV's The Ultimate Fighter: Heavyweights and competing in the UFC, but he has also competed in major European promotions such as KSW, Cage Rage and BAMMA.

== Background ==
Born in London to an Irish father and a Northern Irish mother, McSweeney started kickboxing in England when he was six years old. At 18, he finished school and moved to Amsterdam to train full-time in Dutch kickboxing. He joined Lucien Carbin's gym, where teammates and sparring partners included Alistair Overeem, Valentijn Overeem, and Tyrone Spong. An accomplished kickboxer and Muay Thai fighter, McSweeney won numerous British, Dutch, European and world titles.

== Mixed martial arts career ==
In 2006, McSweeney transitioned to mixed martial arts and moved in with The Ultimate Fighter coach Rashad Evans. The two quickly struck up a bond after McSweeney helped prepare Evans for his bout against Forrest Griffin in December 2008. While training for his fight against Travis Browne, McSweeney switched his camp from Jackson's Submission Fighting in Albuquerque, New Mexico to the Grudge Training Centre in Denver, Colorado to train full-time along with fellow UFC competitors Shane Carwin, Brendan Schaub and Nate Marquardt. McSweeney recently moved out of the Grudge Training Centre to return to the tutelage of European Muay Thai legend Lucien Carbin and to open up his own gym Sledgehammer MMA in Kent, England.

=== The Ultimate Fighter ===
McSweeney was on The Ultimate Fighter: Heavyweights fighting alongside Team Rashad. McSweeney was the first overall pick and fought on the second episode of the show against Wes Shivers defeating him via majority decision. McSweeney moved on to the next round of the tournament, fighting teammate, Matt Mitrione. McSweeney won via guillotine choke in the first round. In the semi-finals, McSweeney lost against former IFL Heavyweight Champion Roy Nelson via TKO after getting caught in the crucifix position.

=== Ultimate Fighting Championship ===
McSweeney was given another chance by the UFC despite losing on The Ultimate Fighter. He fought Darrill Schoonover on The Ultimate Fighter: Heavyweights Finale card in Las Vegas, Nevada, on 5 December, winning by TKO in the third round.

McSweeney made his second appearance for the UFC on The Ultimate Fighter: Team Liddell vs. Team Ortiz Finale preliminary card, fighting against undefeated newcomer Travis Browne. The fight ended in a TKO victory for Browne due to punches at 4:32 of the first round. McSweeney claims he was hit with illegal elbows and briefly tried to appeal the loss. McSweeney later decided against the appeal to focus on his next fight instead.

McSweeney was to drop to the Light Heavyweight division at UFC 120 to fight Tom Blackledge. However, McSweeney would instead face Fábio Maldonado after Blackledge was forced to pull out of the bout. McSweeney lost the bout in the third round via TKO due to punches.

As of 20 January 2011, conversations over McSweeney's Twitter account were strongly indicative that he is no longer a part of the UFC.

=== Independent promotions ===
McSweeney lost a unanimous decision to former UFC Heavyweight Champion Ricco Rodriguez at BAMMA 5: Daley vs Shirai on 26 February 2011. He then had a further loss to submissions ace Francisco France in April 2011 at a Crowbar MMA event. Fighting on 22 July 2011, Mcsweeney defeated Lee Mein by TKO (Punches) in the 1st round. On 20 August 2011, McSweeney defeated Sam Brown by Submission (armbar) in the 1st round.

McSweeney faced former MFC Light Heavyweight Champion Emanuel Newton at Superior Cage Combat 3. He lost by submission in the first round.

McSweeney faced fellow UFC veteran Paul Buentello in a Light Heavyweight bout on 23 August 2013 at Legacy Fighting Championship 22. He lost the fight via TKO in the second round.

=== ONE Fighting Championship ===
In 2014, McSweeney signed with the Asian promotion ONE Championship. He faced Chris Lokteff in his debut at ONE Fighting Championship: Rise of Heroes in May and won via KO due to a flying knee in round 1.

In his second fight for the promotion, McSweeney faced Cristiano Kaminishi at ONE FC: Reign of Champions in August. He again won the fight via KO in the first round.

For his third fight with the promotion, McSweeney faced Roger Gracie at ONE FC 23: Warrior's Way in December. He lost the fight via TKO in the third round.

=== KSW ===
McSweeney was expected to face Polish prospect Michał Andryszak at KSW 45 on 6 October 2018. However, Andryszak was pulled from the event due to injury and was replaced by Thiago Silva. McSweeney lost the fight by unanimous decision.

McSweeney faced Hatef Moeil at Mix Fight Championship 26 on 22 June 2019, losing the bout via first-round technical knockout. In September 2021, McSweeney announced that he had retired from mixed martial arts competition in order to continue his kickboxing career.

== Kickboxing career ==
Having already fought in numerous kickboxing bouts during his career, McSweeney signed with Glory in September 2021. He was scheduled to face Antonio Plazibat at Glory: Collision 3 on 23 October 2021. However, Plazibat was replaced by Gökhan Saki after Plazibat replaced Jamal Ben Saddik against Benjamin Adegbuyi. McSweeney lost by second-round knockout via leg kicks.

In December 2022, McSweeney defeated Bugra Erdogan to win the Mix Fight Heavyweight Championship. The event took place in Frankfurt, Germany.

McSweeney was expected to face Badr Hari in the main event of Glory 88 on 9 September 2023. The fight was cancelled as Hari withdrew from the fight.

In 2024, McSweeney retired from kickboxing.

== Personal life ==
McSweeney is married with one daughter. They reside in Rockwall, Texas. He is a former security guard. On 15 August 2012, he stopped an attempted robbery at a convenience store in Las Vegas by subduing a man armed with a knife.

== Championships and accomplishments ==
=== Kickboxing ===
- Mix Fight Championship
  - Mix Fight Heavyweight Champion (one time, current)

== Kickboxing record (incomplete) ==
Professional Kickboxing Record
47 Wins (31 (T)KO's), 8 Losses, 0 Draw, No Contest
Date	Result	Opponent	Event	Location	Method	Round	Time
2022-12-03	Win	(Turkey) Bugra Erdogan	Mix Fight Championship	Frankfurt, Germany	Decision (Split)	3	3:00
2021-10-23	Loss	(Turkey) Gökhan Saki	Glory: Collision 3	Arnhem, Netherlands	KO (Leg Kicks)	2	2:13
2019-12-07	Loss	(Suriname) Ismael Londt	Mix Fight 27, Heavyweight Tournament Final	Frankfurt, Germany	TKO (Doctor Stoppage)	2	
2019-12-07	Win	(Turkey) Murat Aygün	Mix Fight 27, Heavyweight Tournament Semi Final	Frankfurt, Germany	TKO (Doctor Stoppage)	2	
2018-12-01	Win	(Germany) Danyo Ilunga	Mix Fight Gala 25	Germany	KO (Spinning Backfist)	3	1:10
2018-01-27	Win	(Iran) Firouz Fakhri	Mix Fight Gala 24	İzmir, Turkey	KO (Knee)	2	2:29
2008-04-22	Loss	(Netherlands) Brian Douwes	K-1 World Grand Prix 2008 in Amsterdam	Amsterdam, Netherlands	KO (Left Hook)	1	1:10
2008-03-29	Win	(Croatia) Marin Došen	WFC 4	Ljubljana, Slovenia	TKO (Flying Knee)	2	
2007-04-21	Win	(Canada) Michael McDonald	Cage Rage 21: Judgement Day	London, United KIngdom	Decision (Majority)	3	3:00
2006-02-17	Loss	(Slovakia) Roman Kupčák	K-1 European League 2006 in Bratislava	Bratislava, Slovakia	KO (Strikes)	2	
2005-12-10	Loss	(Netherlands) Koos Wessels	Fights at the Border IV	Lommel, Belgium	Decision	3	3:00
Legend: Win Loss Draw/No contest Notes

== Mixed martial arts record ==
Professional record breakdown
33 matches	15 wins	18 losses
By knockout	9	11
By submission	6	4
By decision	0	3

Res.	Record	Opponent	Method	Event	Date	Round	Time	Location	Notes
Loss	15–18	Hatef Moeil	TKO (punches)	Mix Fight Championship 26	22 June 2019	1	4:13	Hessen, Germany	For the MFC Heavyweight Championship.
Loss	15–17	Thiago Silva	Decision (unanimous)	KSW 45: The Return to Wembley	6 October 2018	3	5:00	London, England	
Loss	15–16	Fernando Rodrigues Jr.	Decision (unanimous)	Superior Challenge 17	19 May 2018	3	5:00	Stockholm, Sweden	For the SC Heavyweight Championship.
Loss	15–15	Tai Tuivasa	TKO (corner stoppage)	Australian Fighting Championship 17	15 October 2016	1	5:00	Melbourne, Australia	For the AFC Heavyweight Championship.
Loss	15–14	Karol Bedorf	TKO (elbows)	KSW 34: New Order	5 March 2016	1	3:33	Warsaw, Poland	For the KSW Heavyweight Championship. Fight of the Night.
Win	15–13	Marcin Różalski	Submission (rear-naked choke)	KSW 32: Road to Wembley	31 October 2015	1	2:13	London, England	KSW Heavyweight title eliminator.
Loss	14–13	Denis Goltsov	TKO (head kick and punches)	Tech-Krep FC - Prime Selection 4: Grandmasters	24 July 2015	2	0:46	Krasnodar, Russia	
Loss	14–12	Roger Gracie	TKO (front kick to the body and punches)	ONE FC 23: Warrior's Way	5 December 2014	3	3:15	Pasay, Philippines	
Win	14–11	Cristiano Kaminishi	KO (punch and soccer kick)	ONE FC: Reign of Champions	29 August 2014	1	1:17	Dubai, United Arab Emirates	
Win	13–11	Chris Lokteff	KO (flying knee)	ONE Fighting Championship: Rise of Heroes	2 May 2014	1	3:04	Pasay, Philippines	
Win	12–11	Stefan Traunmuller	Submission (armbar)	FFC09: McSweeney vs. Traunmuller	15 November 2013	1	0:35	Ljubljana, Slovenia	Return to Heavyweight.
Loss	11–11	Paul Buentello	TKO (body punch)	Legacy FC 22	23 August 2013	2	2:44	Lubbock, Texas, United States	
Win	11–10	Dion Staring	TKO (head kick and punches)	CFA 10: McSweeney vs. Staring	2 March 2013	1	0:38	Coral Gables, Florida, United States	
Loss	10–10	Matti Mäkelä	TKO (punches)	Superior Challenge 8	6 October 2012	2	0:00	Malmö, Sweden	
Win	10–9	Jeff King	Submission (rear-naked choke)	Shamrock Events Kings of Kombat 7	23 June 2012	1	2:30	Melbourne, Australia	
Win	9–9	Kym Robinson	TKO (punches and elbows)	Shamrock Events Night of Mayhem 4	14 April 2012	1	3:03	Dandenong, Victoria, Australia	Return to Light Heavyweight.
Win	8–9	Felis Leniu	Submission (rear-naked choke)	Shamrock Events Kings of Kombat 6	17 March 2012	1	0:00	Keysborough, Victoria, Australia	Heavyweight bout.
Win	7–9	Doug Viney	Submission (rear-naked choke)	Shamrock Events Kings of Kombat 5	10 December 2011	1	2:30	Keysborough, Victoria, Australia	
Loss	6–9	Emanuel Newton	Submission (rear-naked choke)	Superior Cage Combat 3	4 November 2011	1	1:45	Las Vegas, Nevada, United States	
Win	6–8	Sam Brown	Submission (armbar)	Shamrock Events Kings of Kombat 4	20 August 2011	1	2:25	Melbourne, Australia	
Win	5–8	Lee Mein	TKO (punches)	Bully's Fight Night 2	22 July 2011	1	2:01	Lethbridge, Alberta, Canada	
Loss	4–8	Francisco France	Submission (kimura)	Crowbar MMA Spring Brawl 2011	29 April 2011	1	1:35	Fargo, North Dakota, United States	
Loss	4–7	Ricco Rodriguez	Decision (unanimous)	BAMMA 5: Daley vs. Shirai	26 February 2011	3	5:00	Manchester, England	215 pound catchweight bout.
Loss	4–6	Fábio Maldonado	TKO (punches)	UFC 120	16 October 2010	3	0:48	London, England	Light Heavyweight debut.
Loss	4–5	Travis Browne	TKO (punches)	The Ultimate Fighter: Team Liddell vs. Team Ortiz Finale	19 June 2010	1	4:32	Las Vegas, Nevada, United States	
Win	4–4	Darrill Schoonover	TKO (punches and knees)	The Ultimate Fighter: Heavyweights Finale	5 December 2009	3	3:20	Las Vegas, Nevada, United States	
Loss	3–4	Ricardo Romero	Submission (rear-naked choke)	Ring of Combat 24	17 April 2009	1	2:27	Atlantic City, New Jersey, United States	
Loss	3–3	Neil Grove	KO (punches)	UCMMA 1: Bad Breed	6 December 2008	2	1:38	London, England	
Win	3–2	Roman Webber	KO (knee)	Cage Rage 28	20 September 2008	1	0:10	London, England	
Win	2–2	Chris Cooper	TKO (punches)	FX3: Fight Night 9	13 September 2008	1	3:09	Reading, Berkshire, England	
Loss	1–2	Mostapha al-Turk	TKO (punches)	Cage Rage 27	12 July 2008	1	2:06	London, England	For the Cage Rage British Heavyweight Championship.
Loss	1–1	Robert Paczków	Submission (smother choke)	Cage Rage 24	1 December 2007	1	2:09	London, England	
Win	1–0	Mark Buchanan	TKO (punches)	Cage Rage 22	14 July 2007	1	1:30	London, England	

=== Mixed martial arts exhibition record ===
Exhibition record breakdown		
3 matches	2 wins	1 loss
By knockout	0	1
By submission	1	0
By decision	1	0

Res.	Record	Opponent	Method	Event	Date	Round	Time	Location	Notes
Loss	2–1	Roy Nelson	TKO (punches)	The Ultimate Fighter: Heavyweights		1	4:13	Las Vegas, Nevada, United States	Semi-finals.
Win	2–0	Matt Mitrione	Submission (guillotine choke)	The Ultimate Fighter: Heavyweights		1	3:38	Las Vegas, Nevada, United States	Quarter-finals.
Win	1–0	Wes Shivers	Decision (majority)	The Ultimate Fighter: Heavyweights		2	5:00	Las Vegas, Nevada, United States	Preliminary bout.

== Bare-knuckle boxing ==
Professional record breakdown
1 match	0 wins	1 loss
By knockout	0	1
By decision	0	0
By disqualification	0	0
Draws	0	

Res.	Record	Opponent	Method	Event	Date	Round	Time	Location	Notes
Loss	0–1	Lavar Johnson	KO (punch)	Valor Bare Knuckle 1	September 21, 2019	1	0:27	New Town, North Dakota, USA	

== See also ==
- List of male kickboxers
- List of male mixed martial artists
