= 2017 in AFC =

Mixed martial arts events

Information
- First date: 19 March 2017
- Last date: TBA

Events
- Total events: TBA

Fights
- Total fights: TBA
- Title fights: TBA

Chronology
2016 in AFC	2017 in AFC	2018 in AFC

The year 2017 was the 8th year in the history of Australian Fighting Championship (AFC), a mixed martial arts promotion based in Australia. In 2017 AFC held 4 events.

== Events list ==
#	Event title	Date	Arena	Location
22	AFC 21	28 October 2017	Melbourne Pavilion	Melbourne, Australia
21	AFC 20	28 July 2017	Melbourne Pavilion	Melbourne, Australia
20	AFC 19	15 April 2017	AFC Arena	Xi'an, Shaanxi, China
19	AFC 18	14 April 2017	AFC Arena	Xi'an, Shaanxi, China

== AFC 21 ==
AFC 21 was an event meant to be held on 28 October 2017, at AFC Arena in Xi'an, Shaanxi, China. The event was cancelled and instead was held on 28 October 2017, at Melbourne Pavilion, Melbourne, Australia.

=== Results ===
Main card
Weight class				Method	Round	Time	Notes
Light Heavyweight	Rameau Sokoudjou	def.	Jamie Abdallah	TKO (punches)	2	2:16	(Note: For the AFC Light Heavyweight Championship)
Lightweight	Issac Hardman	def.	Rob Hill	KO (punch)	2		(Note: For the AFC Lightweight Championship)
Welterweight	Zhang Lipeng	def.	Mikey Vaotuua	Submission (rear-raked choke)	1
Catchweight (68 kg)	Daniel Jones	def.	Francisco Jose Vinueles	TKO (punches)	2
Bantamweight	Zhang Meixuan	def.	Mario Moreno	Submission (armbar)	2
Welterweight	Wang Shaowei	def.	Peter Davenport	TKO (punches)	3
Lightweight	Cody Pfister	def.	Wu Haotian	Decision (unanimous)	3	5:00
Welterweight	Dane Beeby	def.	Brock McRobb	Submission (rear-naked choke)	2	4:02
Middleweight	Luke Spears	def.	Oscar Kong	Decision (unanimous)	3	5:00
Catchweight (68 kg)	Kazumasa Majima	def.	Luke Jones	Submission (rear-naked choke)	1

== AFC 20 ==
AFC 20 was an event held on 28 July 2017, at Melbourne Pavilion, Melbourne, Australia.

=== Results ===
Main card
Weight class				Method	Round	Time	Notes
Middleweight	Israel Adesanya	def.	Melvin Guillard	TKO (punches)	1	4:49	(Note: For the AFC Middleweight Championship)
Welterweight	Anton Zafir	def.	Hoshi Friedrich	TKO (punches)	1	3:31
Welterweight	Theo Christakos	def.	Abdullah Abou Hamdan	TKO (punches)	2	2:38
Welterweight	Brock McRobb	def.	Steve Thouliss	TKO (punches)	2	3:08
Bantamweight	Jaime Renouf	def.	Joshua Riley	Decision (unanimous)	3	5:00
Flyweight	Nicole Szepesvary	def.	Anthea Paton	Decision (majority)	3	5:00
Heavyweight	Damian Maru	def.	Phil Ikafanga	TKO (submission to punches)	1	4:38
Middleweight	Matt Heath	def.	Oscar Kong	TKO (doctor stoppage)	1	3:41
Welterweight	Saeed Karsaz	Draw	Joe Kendrick	Draw (majority)	3	5:00
Featherweight	James Vandarakis	def.	John Armstrong	Technical Submission (rear-naked choke)	1	1:35

== AFC 19 ==
AFC 19 was an event held on 15 April 2017, at AFC Arena in Xi'an, Shaanxi, China.

=== Results ===
Main card
Weight class				Method	Round	Time	Notes
Lightweight	Issac Hardman	def.	James Bishop	TKO	2	N/A	(Note: For the AFC Lightweight Championship)
Bantamweight	Jun Zhu	def.	Sun Uk Do	TKO	2	N/A
Bantamweight	Arlene Blencowe	def.	Rhiannon Thompson	TKO	1	N/A
Welterweight	Peter Davenport	def.	Harris Norwood	TKO	2	N/A
Featherweight	Tetsuya Seki	def.	Nikos Trepca	TKO	3	N/A
Lightweight	John Mitchell	def.	Chenglin Wu	TKO	1	N/A
N/A	Mohammad Issa Poursalamati	def.	Kefeng Jian	Submission	1	N/A

== AFC 18 ==
AFC 18 was an event held on 14 April 2017, at AFC Arena in Xi'an, Shaanxi, China.

=== Results ===
Main card
Weight class				Method	Round	Time	Notes
Light Heavyweight	Rameau Thierry Sokoudjou	def.	Marcelo Tenorio	TKO (punches and elbows)	1	N/A
Featherweight	Kaan Ofli	def.	Munehiro Fujita	Submission (bulldog choke)	2	N/A
Lightweight	Mikey Vaotuua	def.	Yufei Zhao	Submission (rear-naked choke)	2	N/A
Bantamweight	Long Xiao	def.	Chris Wase	Decision (unanimous)	3	5:00
Middleweight	Glenn Sparv	def.	Yuki Sasaki	TKO	1	N/A
Lightweight	Ruslan Emibek	def.	Amin Yaubi	TKO	1	N/A
N/A	Masoumeh Togan	def.	Zhou Lin	Decision (majority)	3	5:00
