= Tiger Muay Thai =

Mixed martial arts training facility in Phuket, Thailand

- Est.: 2003; 23 years ago
- Primary trainers: Phet Chaimanee (Muay thai); Rafael Fiziev (Striking); Eric Uresk (MMA/Wrestling); Joseph Henle (MMA)
- Prominent fighters: Arman Tsarukyan; Roger Huerta; Alexander Volkanovski; Rafael Fiziev; Cyrus Washington; Dan Hooker; Loma Lookboonmee; Dave Leduc; Kai Kara-France; Valentina Shevchenko; Brad Riddell; Shannon Wiratchai; Mairbek Taisumov; Khamzat Chimaev; Anissa Meksen
- Headquarters: Phuket, Thailand
- Address: 7 35 Soi Ta-iad, Chalong
- Location: Phuket, Thailand
- Training facilities: Phuket, Thailand; San Sai District, Chiang Mai, Thailand
- Website: Tiger Muay Thai

Tiger Muay Thai is a Thai mixed martial arts and muay thai training facility located in Phuket, Thailand.

== History ==
American veteran Sean Douglas previously owned a gym in Phuket consisting of only one ring to serve his muay thai training purposes. The gym gained popularity and with the help of investors, Douglas founded Tiger Muay Thai in a larger premises in 2003. Subsequently, a mixed martial arts program was added.

In 2015, the gym was sold to Thai businessmen and one of them, Viwat Sakulrat, became the managing director of the gym. It has continued to grow and is one of the world's most prominent muay thai gyms.

In July 2021, MMA coaches George and Frank Hickman announced they were leaving the team after an amicable split. In April 2022, they opened their own gym called Bangtao Muay Thai & MMA.

=== Tiger Muay Thai tryouts ===
Since 2013, Tiger Muay Thai has been hosting annual Fight Team tryouts where the best applicants receive scholarships to mixed martial arts and muay thai programs. The tryouts are widely recognized for their intensity and the career opportunities they offer. The tryout spans multiple days and tests athletes across disciplines such as Muay Thai, Brazilian jiu-jitsu, wrestling, and strength conditioning. Candidates also undergo personal interviews, and the challenge concludes with a gruelling run up Big Buddha hill in Phuket.

The tryouts have gained notoriety for launching the careers of notable fighters. Successful participants who earned full scholarships include: Kai Kara-France (2013), Alexander Volkanovski (2014), Dave Leduc (2016), Dan Hooker (2016), and Arman Tsarukyan (2018).

In 2023, Tiger Muay Thai announced a partnership with ONE Championship, offering winners up to US$100,000 in contracts and sponsorships.

== Locations ==
While the original Tiger Muay Thai in Chalong, Phuket remains the headquarters, they opened a new facility to San Sai District, Chiang Mai in 2013.

In 2019, they opened Tiger Muay Thai Beachside in Chalong.

In 2023, Tiger Muay Thai is set to open a new location in Bali, Indonesia.

In 2024, Tiger Muay Thai opened in Singapore, Pasir Panjang, and in 2025, they opened a 2nd boutique outlet in Raffles Place.

== Notable fighters ==
- Anatoly Malykhin, Current ONE Middleweight, Light Heavyweight and Former Heavyweight World Champion
- Fabrício Andrade, Former ONE Bantamweight World Champion
- Petr Yan, Current UFC Bantamweight Champion
- Tang Kai, Current ONE Featherweight World Champion
- Vitaly Bigdash, a Former ONE Middleweight World Champion
- Israel Adesanya, former two-time UFC Middleweight Champion
- Alexander Volkanovski, current UFC Featherweight Champion
- Valentina Shevchenko, current two-time UFC Women's Flyweight Champion
- Antonina Shevchenko
- Dan Hooker
- Rafael Fiziev
- Tai Tuivasa
- Arman Tsarukyan
- Loma Lookboonmee, the first Thai mixed martial artist in the UFC
- Shannon Wiratchai
- Roger Huerta
- Cyrus Washington
- Brad Riddell
- Kai Kara-France
- Timofey Nastyukhin
- Dave Leduc, a Lethwei fighter and a WLC Cruiserweight Champion
- Anissa Meksen, a French kickboxer and Former Glory Women's Super Bantamweight Champion
- Mairbek Taisumov
- Alexey Kunchenko
- Khamzat Chimaev, Current UFC Middleweight Champion
- Kairat Akhmetov, a Former ONE Flyweight World Champion
