= Gustavo Falciroli =

Australian-Brazilian former mixed martial artist and BJJ practitioner

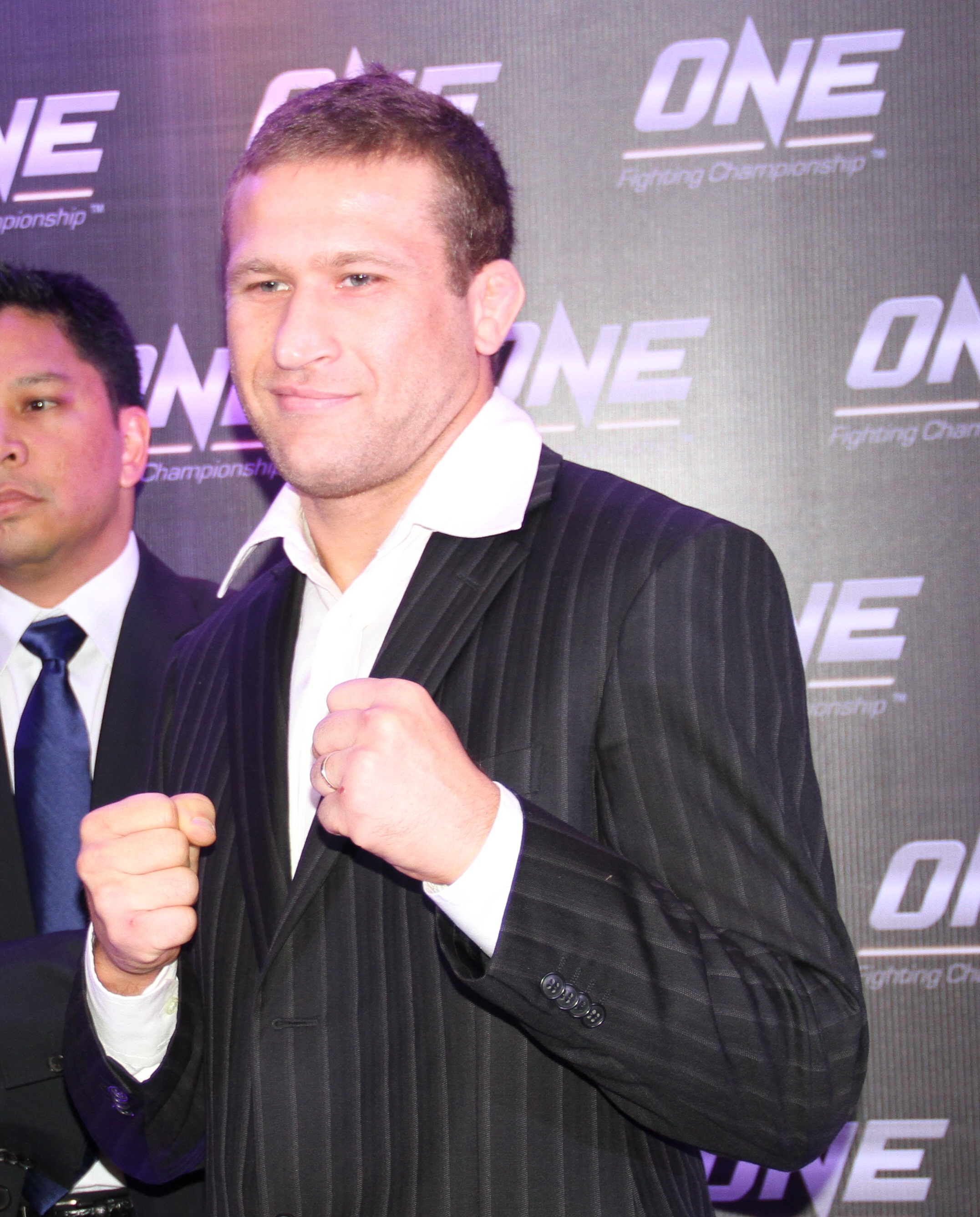
- Born: 13 December 1982 (age 43); São Paulo, Brazil
- Nationality: Brazilian and Australian
- Height: 5 ft 8 in (1.73 m)
- Weight: 135 lb (61 kg; 9.6 st)
- Division: Bantamweight
- Reach: 68 in (173 cm)
- Style: Brazilian jiu-jitsu
- Stance: Orthodox
- Fighting out of: Melbourne, Australia
- Team: Lab33
- Rank: Fourth degree black belt in Brazilian jiu-jitsu under Roberto Tozi and Roberto Godoi
- Years active: 1996–2018

Mixed martial arts record
- Total: 26
- Wins: 17
- By knockout: 3
- By submission: 10
- By decision: 4
- Losses: 6
- By knockout: 1
- By decision: 5
- Draws: 2
- No contests: 1

Other information
- Mixed martial arts record from Sherdog

Gustavo Falciroli (born 13 December 1982) is an Australian-Brazilian former mixed martial artist, and Brazilian jiu-jitsu practitioner. Falciroli has formerly competed in Australian Fighting Championship, where he was the inaugural bantamweight champion. He also competed in ONE FC, Shooto, and Cage Fighting Championship (CFC), where he was the former bantamweight champion. He is regarded as one of the most decorated mixed martial arts fighters in Australia's history and he is a fourth degree Brazilian jiu-jitsu black belt.

== Brazilian jiu-jitsu ==
Gustavo started his training in 1996 with Brazilian Jiu-Jitsu with Paulo Roberto de Miranda Streckert and has also trained with Carlos Alberto Liberi, in 2003 he was awarded his black belt by Roberto Tozi and Roberto Godoi. After placing third at the BJJ World Championships, winning the Brazilian Cup and taking home a slew of state titles in Brazil—all as a black belt—in 2007 he made the move to Australia and the transition into MMA. Since entering the world of mixed martial arts, Gustavo has replicated the success he found in BJJ and is renowned for his ability to apply his grappling and submissions in MMA.

== Mixed martial arts career ==
Gustavo made his mixed martial arts debut at Shooto Australia in Perth in May 2007. Gustavo defeated Richie Vaculik for the inaugural Cage Fighting Championships (CFC) bantamweight title at CFC 12, December 2010, via unanimous decision (5 rounds). He defended for the first time on 9 December 2011, winning by submission against Nick Honstein at Cage Fighting Championship 19. In February 2012 Gustavo attended at ONE Fighting Championship: Battle of Heroes, Jakarta to be the first ever Australian to fight in the Asian show. He submitted Soo Chul Kim via rear naked choke on the first round to become victorious. In August 2012 Gustavo contended in a main event ONE Fighting Championship at ONE Fighting Championship: Pride of a Nation, Philippines. He was defeated by Bibiano Fernandes via unanimous decision. Gustavo is the inaugural Australian Fighting Championship (AFC) bantamweight title holder after defeating New Zealander Kai Kara-France at AFC 9, via submission in round 1 in May 2014. The title fight was a rematch from AFC 7 after France fell out of the ring after being knocked out and struck a ringside table, a controversial No Contest was adjudicated by officials.

== Achievements ==
=== Mixed martial arts ===
- Cage Fighting Championship
  - CFC Bantamweight Championship (Two times)
- Australian Fighting Championship
  - AFC Bantamweight Championship (One time; current)
- K-Oz Entertainment
  - K-Oz Entertainment Bantamweight Championship (One time; current)
- Xtreme Fighting Championship
  - XFC Xtreme Fighting Bantamweight Championship (One time; current)

=== Main titles ===
- Black Belt
  - 2011 – Gold – Pan Pacific Championship (Melbourne, Australia)
  - 2011 – Gold – Australian Cup (Perth, Australia)
  - 2006 – Gold – São Paulo State Championship (São Paulo, Brazil)
  - 2006 – Silver – South American Championship ( Florianópolis, Brazil)
  - 2006 – Silver – Brazilian Cup (Rio de Janeiro, Brazil)
  - 2005 – Gold – King of the Grappler (Seoul, South Korea)
  - 2004 – Bronze – World Championships (Rio de Janeiro, Brazil)
  - 2004 – Gold – Brazilian South Cup (Porto Alegre, Brazil)
  - 2004 – Gold -Brazilian Cup (Rio de Janeiro, Brazil)
  - 2004 – Gold -São Paulo State Championship (São Paulo, Brazil)
- Brown Belt
  - 2003 – Gold – World Cup (Rio de Janeiro, Brazil)
  - 2003 – Gold – Brazilian Championship (Rio de Janeiro, Brazil)
  - 2003 – Gold – São Paulo State Championship (São Paulo, Brazil)
- Purple Belt
  - 2001 – Bronze – Pan-American Championship (Orlando, USA)
  - 2000 – Gold – São Paulo State Championship (São Paulo, Brazil)
  - 2000 – Bronze – Pan-American Championship (Orlando, USA)
- Blue Belt
  - 1999 – Gold – Brazilian Championship (Rio de Janeiro, Brazil)
  - 1999 – Bronze – World Championship (Rio de Janeiro, Brazil)
  - 1999 – Gold – São Paulo State Championship (São Paulo, Brazil)

== Personal life ==
Gustavo immigrated to Australia and has lived in Perth in Western Australia but has since relocated to Melbourne. In December 2012, Falciroli was subject to xenophobia on Melbourne public transport. After hearing him speak in Portuguese, a man approached Falciroli and told him that this was "not his country". He threatened to "cut" and "rape" him, his wife, and his two children. Falciroli got off the train and called the police. "Despite it [being] a bad situation, once again life has showed me that violence just creates more violence and I never should use my skills outside a cage, a ring or a mat," Falciroli said on social media.

== Mixed martial arts record ==
Professional record breakdown
26 matches	17 wins	6 losses
By knockout	3	1
By submission	10	0
By decision	4	5
Draws	2	
No contests	1	

Res.	Record	Opponent	Method	Event	Date	Round	Time	Location	Notes
Loss	17–6–2 (1)	Alan Philpott	Decision (unanimous)	ACB 88: Barnatt vs. Celiński	16 June 2018	3	5:00	Brisbane, Australia	
Win	17–5–2 (1)	Julian Wallace	Submission (triangle choke)	XFC 27	27 August 2016	2	4:47	Mansfield, Australia	
Loss	16–5–2 (1)	Darwin Sagurit	TKO (punch)	Minotaur 3: Carnage	4 March 2016	1	N/A	Parkville, Victoria, Australia	
Win	16–4–2 (1)	Hikaru Hasumi	Submission (armbar)	HFS – Hex Fight Series 4	31 October 2015	1	4:40	Melbourne, Australia	
Win	15–4–2 (1)	Mohd Fouzein Mohd Fozi	Submission (brabo choke)	K-Oz Entertainment – Bragging Rights 7: Resurrection	27 Sep 2015	1	1:13	Perth, Australia	Won the K-Oz Bantamweight Championship.
Win	14–4–2 (1)	Kai Kara-France	Submission (brabo choke)	Australian Fighting Championship 9	17 May 2014	1	4:55	Albury, Australia	Won the AFC Bantamweight Championship.
NC	13–4–2 (1)	Kai Kara-France	No Contest	Australian Fighting Championship 7	14 December 2013	2	3:20	Melbourne, Australia	Kara-France fell through the ropes of the ring and was unable to continue
Loss	13–4–2	Bibiano Fernandes	Decision (unanimous)	ONE FC: Pride of a Nation	31 August 2012	3	5:00	Manila, Philippines	
Win	13–3–2	Soo Chul Kim	Submission (rear-naked choke)	ONE FC: Battle of Heroes	11 February 2012	1	1:12	Jakarta, Indonesia	
Win	12–3–2	Nick Honstein	Submission (arm triangle choke)	Cage Fighting Championship 19	9 December 2011	2	3:14	Sydney, Australia	Defended the CFC Bantamweight Championship.
Loss	11–3–2	Taiki Tsuchiya	Decision (unanimous)	Shooto: The Way of Shooto 6: Like a Tiger, Like a Dragon	19 November 2010	3	5:00	Tokyo, Japan	
Win	11–2–2	Hideki Kadowaki	KO (punches)	Shooto Australia – Superfight Australia 8	11 June 2010	1	1:53	Joondalup, Australia	
Win	10–2–2	Richie Vaculik	Decision (unanimous)	Cage Fighting Championship 12	3 December 2010	5	5:00	Sydney, Australia	Won the CFC Bantamweight Championship.
Loss	9–2–2	Issei Tamura	Decision (unanimous)	Shooto: Revolutionary Exchanges 3	23 November 2009	3	5:00	Tokyo, Japan	
Win	9–1–2	Daisuke Ishizawa	Submission (triangle armbar)	Shooto: Revolutionary Exchanges 2	22 September 2009	1	4:55	Tokyo, Japan	
Win	8–1–2	Akiyo Nishiura	Decision (majority)	Shooto Australia – Superfight Australia 6	10 July 2009	3	5:00	Joondalup, Australia	
Win	7–1–2	Masahiro Oishi	TKO (punches)	Rize 1 – Rize MMA	23 May 2009	2	2:02	Queensland, Australia	
Win	6–1–2	Kazuhiro Ito	Decision (unanimous)	Shooto Australia – Superfight Australia 5	30 November 2008	3	5:00	Joondalup, Australia	
Win	5–1–2	Taro Kusano	KO (punch)	Shooto Australia – Superfight Australia 4	15 June 2008	1	0:53	Perth, Australia	
Win	4–1–2	Ryan Mortimer	Submission (armbar)	WR 13 – Warriors Realm 13	19 April 2008	1	2:46	Southport, Australia	
Draw	3–1–2	Takumi Ota	Draw	Shooto Australia – Superfight Australia 3	16 March 2008	2	5:00	Perth, Australia	
Loss	3–1–1	Bernardo Magalhaes	Decision (majority)	CFC – Cage Fighting Championships 3	15 February 2008	3	5:00	Sydney, Australia	
Win	3–0–1	Michiyuki Ishibashi	Submission (rear-naked choke)	Shooto Australia – Superfight Australia 2	23 November 2007	1	NA	Perth, Australia	
Draw	2–0–1	Jai Bradney	Draw	IC 2 – Inspirit Challenge 2	26 August 2007	2	5:00	Australia	
Win	2–0	Sergio Cabral	Decision (unanimous)	MMAB – MMA Boxing	19 August 2007	2	5:00	Perth, Australia	
Win	1–0	Mark Oates	Submission (armbar)	Shooto Australia – Superfight Australia 1	26 May 2007	1	1:10	Perth, Australia	
