= Tai Tuivasa =

Australian mixed martial artist (born 1993)

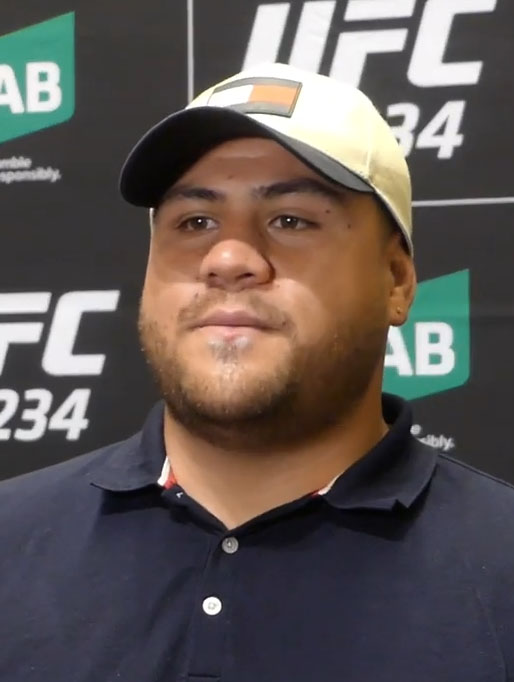
- Tuivasa at UFC 234 in 2019
- Born: Tai Anthony Tuivasa; 16 March 1993 (age 33); Sydney, Australia
- Other names: Bam Bam
- Height: 6 ft 2 in (1.88 m)
- Weight: 265 lb (120 kg; 18 st 13 lb)
- Division: Heavyweight
- Reach: 75 in (191 cm)
- Fighting out of: Sydney, New South Wales, Australia
- Team: Bangtao Muay Thai & MMA; Tiger Muay Thai & MMA; American Kickboxing Academy (2020–present); TK MMA & Fitness (2021–present)
- Years active: 2012–present

Professional boxing record
- Total: 7
- Wins: 5
- By knockout: 3
- Losses: 2

Kickboxing record
- Total: 16
- Wins: 14
- By knockout: 10
- Losses: 2

Mixed martial arts record
- Total: 25
- Wins: 14
- By knockout: 13
- By decision: 1
- Losses: 11
- By knockout: 3
- By submission: 3
- By decision: 5

Other information
- Boxing record from BoxRec
- Mixed martial arts record from Sherdog

Tai Anthony Tuivasa (born 16 March 1993) is an Australian professional mixed martial artist. He competed in the Heavyweight division of the Ultimate Fighting Championship (UFC).

== Early life ==
Tuivasa was born in Sydney to an Indigenous Australian (Wiradjuri) mother and a Samoan father. He grew up in the western Sydney suburb of Mount Druitt with 11 siblings, and predominantly played rugby league in his youth. He was signed by the professional Sydney Roosters rugby league club in 2010, but gave up playing the sport when he developed a gambling addiction.

== Mixed martial arts career ==
=== Early career ===
Tuivasa made his professional MMA debut in August 2012 in his native Australia. He fought sporadically over the next four years, with all of his wins ending in knockouts.

Tuivasa also fought a couple of MMA mixed rules bouts with Combat 8 promotions. Tuivasa fought Australian former rugby league representative John Hopoate on 1 December 2012 in the Newcastle Panthers FC arena at Combat 8:02, the second Combat 8 event, winning the fight by TKO. Tuivasa later fought kickboxer Peter Graham at Combat 8:03, in a back-and-forth brawl that seemed as if Tuivasa would finish his opponent early on. Yet as the fight went on, Graham rallied and Tuivasa tired, leading to an eventual loss for Tuivasa via TKO in the second round due to punches.

=== Ultimate Fighting Championship ===
In November 2016, it was announced that Tuivasa had signed a four-fight contract with the Ultimate Fighting Championship. According to Tuivasa, he had to sit out for an extended period due to a knee injury and subsequent surgery.

Tuivasa made his UFC debut against Rashad Coulter on 19 November 2017 at UFC Fight Night 121. Tuivasa won the fight by knockout after a flying knee in the first round, and became the first Indigenous Australian to win a UFC fight. This win also earned him the Performance of the Night bonus.

Tuivasa faced Cyril Asker on 11 February 2018 at UFC 221. He won the fight via technical knock out in the first round. On 13 February 2018 Tuivasa entered the UFC's official rankings for heavyweight fighters, coming in at position 15.

In March 2018, Tuivasa signed a new, four-fight contract with UFC. Tuivasa faced Andrei Arlovski on 9 June 2018 at UFC 225. He won the fight by unanimous decision.

Tuivasa faced former UFC Heavyweight Champion Junior dos Santos on 2 December 2018 at UFC Fight Night 142. He lost the fight via technical knockout in round two.

Tuivasa faced Blagoy Ivanov on 8 June 2019 at UFC 238. He lost the fight via unanimous decision.

Tuivasa faced Serghei Spivac on 6 October 2019 at UFC 243. He lost the fight via arm-triangle choke in the second round.

Tuivasa was scheduled to face Jarjis Danho on 6 June 2020 at UFC 251. However, on 9 April, Dana White, the president of UFC, announced that this event was postponed to a future date.

Tuivasa faced Stefan Struve on 24 October 2020 at UFC 254. He won the fight via knockout in the first round.

Tuivasa was scheduled to face Don'Tale Mayes on 20 March 2021 at UFC on ESPN 21. However, Mayes was removed from the fight during the week leading up to the event for undisclosed reasons and was replaced by promotional newcomer Harry Hunsucker. Tuivasa won the fight via technical knockout in round one.

Tuivasa faced Greg Hardy on 10 July 2021 at UFC 264. He won the fight via knockout in round one. This win earned him the Performance of the Night award.

Tuivasa was scheduled to face Walt Harris on 30 October 2021 at UFC 267; however, Harris pulled out of the bout. Tuivasa was then scheduled to face Augusto Sakai on 20 November 2021 at UFC Fight Night 198, but due to visa issues for Tuivasa, the bout was scrapped. The bout was rescheduled and eventually took place on 11 December 2021 at UFC 269. Tuivasa won the fight via knockout in the second round. The win also earned Tuivasa his third Performance of the Night bonus award.

Tuivasa faced Derrick Lewis on 12 February 2022 at UFC 271. Tuivasa won the fight via knockout in round two. The win earned him a Performance of the Night bonus award.

Tuivasa faced Ciryl Gane on 3 September 2022 at UFC Fight Night 209. Despite a knockdown for Tuivasa in the second round, he lost the fight via knockout in round three. This fight earned him the Fight of the Night award.

Tuivasa faced Sergei Pavlovich on 3 December 2022, at UFC on ESPN 42. He lost the fight via knockout in the first round.

Tuivasa faced Alexander Volkov on 10 September 2023, at UFC 293. He lost the fight via ezekiel choke in the second round.

Tuivasa was scheduled to face Marcin Tybura on 17 February 2024, at UFC 298. On 12 January 2024, it was announced that the fight was rescheduled to headline UFC Fight Night 239 on 16 March 2024. He lost the bout in the first round due to a rear-naked choke submission.

Tuivasa faced Jairzinho Rozenstruik on 18 August 2024 at UFC 305. He lost the fight by split decision. Judge Howie Booth, who scored the fight 30-27 for Tuivasa, was relieved of his duties midway through the event, and received widespread criticism from pundits, fighters and fans for his scorecard; 15 out of 15 media outlets scored the bout 30-27 for Rozenstruik.

After almost an 18-month hiatus, Tuivasa faced Tallison Teixeira on 1 February 2026, at UFC 325. He lost the fight by unanimous decision.

Tuivasa was scheduled to face Sean Sharaf on 2 May 2026 at UFC Fight Night 275. However, Sharaf withdrew due to a broken nose and was replaced by Louie Sutherland. After being deducted one point due to an illegal knee to the head, Tuivasa lost the fight via unanimous decision.

Tuivasa faced Robelis Despaigne on 19 September 2026 at UFC 331. He lost the fight by split decision, tying Tony Ferguson for the most consecutive losses in UFC history with eight.

== Personal life ==
Tuivasa has one son, with Brierley Pedro who is the sister of former UFC light heavyweight fighter Tyson Pedro.

Tuivasa currently hosts "The Halfcast Podcast", with Tyson Pedro and Andrew Fifita as co-hosts.

Since 2018, Tuivasa has celebrated his victories by doing a shoey, drinking beer from a borrowed shoe. Sydney newspaper The Daily Telegraph coined the moniker "Shoeyvasa". At UFC 254, he won again but was not allowed to do the shoey in the cage, but has since continued the tradition.

Tuivasa is co-owner of Drink West Brewery with Tyson Pedro and Nathan Cleary.

Tuivasa won the 2024 edition of The Amazing Race Australia (celebrity edition) with his brother Logan.

== Championships and accomplishments ==
- Ultimate Fighting Championship
  - Performance of the Night (Four times) vs. Rashad Coulter, Greg Hardy, Augusto Sakai and Derrick Lewis
  - Fight of the Night (One time) vs. Ciryl Gane
  - Tied for fourth most consecutive knockouts in UFC history (5)
  - Longest losing streak in UFC Heavyweight division history (8)
    - Tied (Tony Ferguson) for the longest losing streak in UFC history (8)
  - UFC.com Awards
    - 2022: Ranked #7 Fight of the Year vs. Ciryl Gane & Ranked #8 Upset of the Year vs. Derrick Lewis
- Australian Fighting Championship
  - AFC Heavyweight Champion (One time)
- National Dreamtime Awards
  - 2018 International Sportsperson of the Year
- MMAjunkie.com
  - 2021 July Knockout of the Month vs. Greg Hardy
- MMA Fighting
  - 2022 Third Team MMA All-Star

== Mixed martial arts record ==
Professional record breakdown
25 matches	14 wins	11 losses
By knockout	13	3
By submission	0	3
By decision	1	5

Res.	Record	Opponent	Method	Event	Date	Round	Time	Location	Notes
Loss	14–11	Robelis Despaigne	Decision (split)	UFC 331	19 September 2026	3	5:00	Los Angeles, California, United States	
Loss	14–10	Louie Sutherland	Decision (unanimous)	UFC Fight Night: Della Maddalena vs. Prates	2 May 2026	3	5:00	Perth, Australia	Tuivasa was deducted one point in round 3 due to an illegal knee to the head.
Loss	14–9	Tallison Teixeira	Decision (unanimous)	UFC 325	1 February 2026	3	5:00	Sydney, Australia	
Loss	14–8	Jairzinho Rozenstruik	Decision (split)	UFC 305	18 August 2024	3	5:00	Perth, Australia	
Loss	14–7	Marcin Tybura	Technical Submission (rear-naked choke)	UFC Fight Night: Tuivasa vs. Tybura	16 March 2024	1	4:08	Las Vegas, Nevada, United States	
Loss	14–6	Alexander Volkov	Submission (Ezekiel choke)	UFC 293	10 September 2023	2	4:37	Sydney, Australia	
Loss	14–5	Sergei Pavlovich	KO (punches)	UFC on ESPN: Thompson vs. Holland	3 December 2022	1	0:54	Orlando, Florida, United States	
Loss	14–4	Ciryl Gane	KO (punches)	UFC Fight Night: Gane vs. Tuivasa	3 September 2022	3	4:23	Paris, France	Fight of the Night.
Win	14–3	Derrick Lewis	KO (elbow)	UFC 271	12 February 2022	2	1:40	Houston, Texas, United States	Performance of the Night.
Win	13–3	Augusto Sakai	KO (punches)	UFC 269	11 December 2021	2	0:26	Las Vegas, Nevada, United States	Performance of the Night.
Win	12–3	Greg Hardy	KO (punches)	UFC 264	10 July 2021	1	1:07	Las Vegas, Nevada, United States	Performance of the Night.
Win	11–3	Harry Hunsucker	TKO (punches)	UFC on ESPN: Brunson vs. Holland	20 March 2021	1	0:49	Las Vegas, Nevada, United States	
Win	10–3	Stefan Struve	KO (punches)	UFC 254	24 October 2020	1	4:59	Abu Dhabi, United Arab Emirates	
Loss	9–3	Serghei Spivac	Technical Submission (arm-triangle choke)	UFC 243	6 October 2019	2	3:14	Melbourne, Australia	
Loss	9–2	Blagoy Ivanov	Decision (unanimous)	UFC 238	8 June 2019	3	5:00	Chicago, Illinois, United States	
Loss	9–1	Junior dos Santos	TKO (punches)	UFC Fight Night: dos Santos vs. Tuivasa	2 December 2018	2	2:30	Adelaide, Australia	
Win	9–0	Andrei Arlovski	Decision (unanimous)	UFC 225	9 June 2018	3	5:00	Chicago, Illinois, United States	
Win	8–0	Cyril Asker	TKO (punches and elbows)	UFC 221	11 February 2018	1	2:18	Perth, Australia	
Win	7–0	Rashad Coulter	KO (flying knee)	UFC Fight Night: Werdum vs. Tybura	19 November 2017	1	4:35	Sydney, Australia	Performance of the Night.
Win	6–0	James McSweeney	TKO (corner stoppage)	Australian FC 17	15 October 2016	1	5:00	Melbourne, Australia	Defended the AFC Heavyweight Championship.
Win	5–0	Brandon Sosoli	KO (elbow)	Australian FC 16	18 June 2016	1	0:21	Melbourne, Australia	Won the AFC Heavyweight Championship.
Win	4–0	Gul Pohatu	TKO (punches)	Urban Fight Night 5	12 December 2015	1	0:44	Liverpool, Australia	
Win	3–0	Erik Nosa	TKO (punches)	Gladiators Cage Fighting 3	9 November 2012	1	0:28	Sydney, Australia	
Win	2–0	Aaron Nieborak	TKO (punches)	Gladiators Cage Fighting 2	31 August 2012	1	N/A	Sydney, Australia	
Win	1–0	Simon Osborne	TKO (punches)	Elite Cage Championships 2	6 July 2012	1	N/A	Sydney, Australia	Heavyweight debut.

== Professional boxing record ==
7 fights	5 wins	2 losses
By knockout	3	0
By decision	1	2
By disqualification	1	0

No.	Result	Record	Opponent	Type	Round, time	Date	Location	Notes
7	Loss	5–2	Demsey McKean	UD	3	15 April 2016	The Melbourne Pavilion, Flemington, Victoria, Australia	Frank Bianco Cup Eight Man Heavyweight tournament Final
6	Win	5–1	David Tuitupou	UD	3	15 April 2016	The Melbourne Pavilion, Flemington, Victoria, Australia	Frank Bianco Cup Eight Man Heavyweight tournament Semi Final
5	Win	4–1	Hamad Alloush	TKO	2 (3), 1:33	15 April 2016	The Melbourne Pavilion, Flemington, Victoria, Australia	Frank Bianco Cup Eight Man Heavyweight tournament Quarter Final
4	Loss	3–1	Michael Kirby	UD	3	3 April 2014	The Melbourne Pavilion, Flemington, Victoria, Australia	Eight man heavyweight tournament final
3	Win	3–0	Willie Nasio	TKO	1 (3), 2:00	3 April 2014	The Melbourne Pavilion, Flemington, Victoria, Australia	Eight man heavyweight tournament Semi final
2	Win	2–0	Brett Smith	DQ	1 (3), 3:00	3 April 2014	The Melbourne Pavilion, Flemington, Victoria, Australia	Eight man heavyweight tournament Quarter final
1	Win	1–0	Nathan McKay	KO	3 (4), 2:57	13 December 2013	Olympic Park Sports Centre, Homebush, New South Wales, Australia	Professional debut

== Kickboxing career ==
=== GFC ===
- In 2014 Tai competed in the GFC Heavyweight Tournament, Semi Finals against Ismael Lazaar and lost by technical knockout in round 2.

=== Record ===
- Tai obtained a kickboxing record of 12 wins and two losses.

== MMA mixed rules record ==
Professional record breakdown
2 matches	1 win	1 loss
By knockout	1	1

Res.	Record	Opponent	Method	Event	Date	Round	Time	Location	Notes
Loss	1–1	Peter Graham	TKO (punches)	Combat8 3	27 April 2013	2	2:55	Big Top, Sydney, Australia	
Win	1–0	John Hopoate	TKO (punches)	Combat8 2	1 December 2012	1	1:40	Wests City, Newcastle, Australia	

== See also ==
- List of current UFC fighters
- List of male mixed martial artists
