= Dan Hooker =

New Zealand mixed martial artist (born 1990)

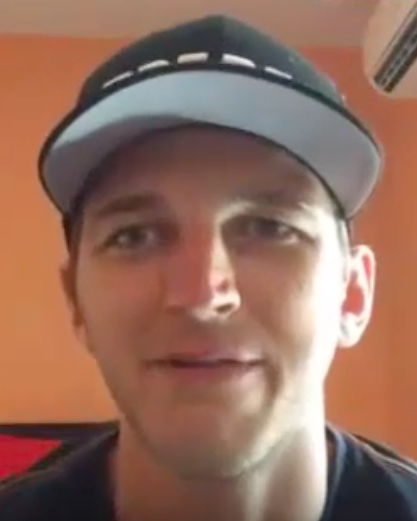
- Hooker in 2016
- Born: Daniel Preston Hooker; 13 February 1990 (age 36); Auckland, New Zealand
- Height: 6 ft 0 in (1.83 m)
- Weight: 156 lb (71 kg; 11 st 2 lb)
- Division: Featherweight (2012, 2014–2016, 2022); Lightweight (2009–2013, 2017–present)
- Reach: 75 1/2 in (192 cm)
- Style: Kickboxing
- Stance: Orthodox
- Fighting out of: Auckland, New Zealand
- Team: Tiger Muay Thai; City Kickboxing; Saigon Sports Club
- Trainer: Eugene Bareman; Doug Viney
- Rank: Black belt in Brazilian Jiu-Jitsu under Karl Webber and Teariki Pina Simpson
- Years active: 2009–present

Kickboxing record
- Total: 13
- Wins: 9
- By knockout: 5
- Losses: 1
- Draws: 3

Mixed martial arts record
- Total: 40
- Wins: 25
- By knockout: 11
- By submission: 7
- By decision: 7
- Losses: 15
- By knockout: 5
- By submission: 4
- By decision: 6

Other information
- Mixed martial arts record from Sherdog

Daniel Preston Hooker (born 13 February 1990) is a New Zealand professional mixed martial artist and former kickboxer. He currently competes in the Lightweight division of the Ultimate Fighting Championship (UFC). Hooker was the King in the Ring Middleweight Kickboxing Champion and WKBF X-Rules Welterweight Champion.

== Early life ==
Hooker was born in Auckland, New Zealand, into a family of partial Māori (Ngāti Maniapoto) descent. He grew up playing both codes of rugby throughout his schooling and was introduced to mixed martial arts by a friend after leaving school.

== Mixed martial arts career ==
=== Early career ===
Hooker made his professional mixed martial arts debut in March 2009. He fought primarily in his native New Zealand and amassed a record of 10–4 before joining the Ultimate Fighting Championship.

Dan is also a professional kickboxer with a 9–1–3 record, winning the King In The Ring Middleweight Kickboxing Championship and WKBF X-Rules Welterweight Championship.

Hooker also has a 3–2 submission grappling record. On 18 October 2009 he took part in the ICNZ Contender Series 1 No-Gi Submission Wrestling Tournament. He beat Thomas Kwok and Bass Khou by guillotine choke and lost to Pumau Campbell on points. He also competed in the New Zealand 2011 No-Gi Nationals, in the Advanced under 77 kg / 170 lbs division, he beat Paul Faavaoga in the first round and lost to LJ Stevenson in the second round.

He has also competed in a heavyweight fight, for which he weighed in at 86 kg / 189 lbs, against Mark Creedy, winning by knockout in the second round. He also partook in a heavyweight kickboxing spar, in Strikeforce Gym, New Lynn, involving Antz Nansen.

Hooker has been coaching MMA since 2008, spending time as head coach at City Kickboxing gym in Auckland. In mid 2018 Hooker opened his own gym Combat Academy in Ellerslie, Auckland, a gym with a full-sized boxing ring and an octagon.

=== Ultimate Fighting Championship ===
==== 2014 ====
Hooker made his promotional debut against fellow newcomer Ian Entwistle on 28 June 2014 at UFC Fight Night 43. Hooker won the back-and-forth fight via TKO in the first round.

Hooker faced Maximo Blanco on 20 September 2014 at UFC Fight Night 52. Hooker lost the fight via unanimous decision.

==== 2015 ====
Hooker faced Hatsu Hioki on 10 May 2015 at UFC Fight Night 65. He won the fight via knockout due to a combination of head kick and punches in the second round. With this win, he became the first man to knock out Hioki in a MMA fight. The win also earned Hooker his first Performance of the Night bonus award.

Hooker next faced Yair Rodríguez on 3 October 2015 at UFC 192. He lost the fight by unanimous decision.

==== 2016 ====
In April 2016, Hooker competed in the 2016 Tiger Muay Thai Tryouts in Phuket, and won a place on the professional fight team, along with teammate Dave Leduc.

Hooker next faced Mark Eddiva on 20 March 2016 at UFC Fight Night 85. He won the fight with a high-elbow mounted guillotine choke in the first round.

Hooker faced Jason Knight on 27 November 2016 at UFC Fight Night 101. He lost the fight via unanimous decision.

==== 2017 ====
Moving up from featherweight to lightweight, Hooker fought Ross Pearson on 11 June 2017 at UFC Fight Night 110. He trained locally in City Kickboxing in Newton, Auckland. He won the fight via knockout in the second round. The win also earned Hooker his second Performance of the Night bonus award.

Hooker faced Marc Diakiese on 30 December 2017 at UFC 219 He won the fight via guillotine choke submission in the third round.

==== 2018 ====
Hooker faced Jim Miller on 21 April 2018 at UFC Fight Night 128. He won the fight via knockout in round one.

Hooker faced Gilbert Burns on 7 July 2018 at UFC 226. He won the fight via knockout in round one.

Hooker faced Edson Barboza on 15 December 2018 at UFC on Fox 31. Hooker lost the fight via TKO.

==== 2019 ====
Hooker faced James Vick on 20 July 2019 at UFC on ESPN 4. He won the fight via knockout in the first round. This win earned him the Performance of the Night bonus.

Hooker faced former UFC title challenger Al Iaquinta on 6 October 2019 at UFC 243. He won the fight via unanimous decision.

==== 2020 ====
Hooker faced Paul Felder on 23 February 2020 at UFC Fight Night: Felder vs. Hooker. Hooker won the fight by a controversial split decision. Out of 17 media members, 12 scored it for Felder, and only 4 for Hooker. This fight earned him a Fight of the Night award.

Hooker faced returning UFC title challenger Dustin Poirier on 27 June 2020 at UFC on ESPN: Poirier vs. Hooker. He lost the fight via unanimous decision. This contest earned him the Fight of the Night award. This bout was widely considered one of the greatest fights of the year, due its back-and-forth bloody exchanges.

==== 2021 ====
Hooker faced former three-time Bellator MMA lightweight champion and UFC newcomer Michael Chandler at UFC 257 on 24 January 2021. He lost the fight via technical knockout in the first round. After the bout, Hooker placed his gloves in the middle of the octagon as a sign of retirement. However, he then clarified that after reconsideration, he would not retire from the sport.

Hooker faced Nasrat Haqparast on 25 September 2021 at UFC 266. He won the fight via unanimous decision.

Hooker faced Islam Makhachev as a short notice replacement for Rafael Dos Anjos at UFC 267. He lost the bout via submission due to a kimura in round one.

==== 2022 ====
Hooker faced Arnold Allen in a featherweight bout on 19 March 2022 at UFC Fight Night 204. He lost the fight via technical knockout in the first round.

Hooker faced Claudio Puelles on 12 November 2022 at UFC 281. He won the fight via technical knockout in the second round.

==== 2023 ====
Hooker was scheduled to face Jalin Turner on 4 March 2023 at UFC 285. However, Hooker was forced to withdraw from the event citing a hand injury, and he was replaced by Mateusz Gamrot.

Hooker faced Jalin Turner on 8 July 2023 at UFC 290. At the weigh-ins Turner weighed in at 158 pounds, 2 pounds over the non-title lightweight limit. As a result, the bout proceeded as a catchweight and Turner was fined 20% of his fight purse, which went to Hooker. In a back and forth bout, Hooker came out victorious via split decision.

Hooker was scheduled to face Bobby Green on 2 December 2023 at UFC on ESPN 52. However, the week before the event, Hooker withdrew due to injury, and was replaced by Jalin Turner.

==== 2024 ====
Hooker fought former KSW Lightweight Champion and KSW Featherweight Champion Mateusz Gamrot on 18 August 2024 at UFC 305. He won the fight by split decision. 8 out of 17 media outlets scored the bout for Hooker. This fight earned him another Fight of the Night award.

==== 2025 ====
Hooker was scheduled to face former UFC Interim Lightweight Champion Justin Gaethje on 8 March 2025 at UFC 313. However, Hooker had to withdraw from the bout due to a hand injury, and was replaced by Rafael Fiziev.

Hooker faced Arman Tsarukyan in the main event on 22 November 2025 at UFC Fight Night 265. He lost the fight via an arm-triangle choke submission in the second round.

==== 2026 ====
Hooker faced Benoît Saint Denis in the co-main event on 1 February 2026 at UFC 325. He lost the fight by technical knockout in the second round.

Hooker faced promotional newcomer Salahdine Parnasse in the main event on 5 September 2026, at UFC Fight Night 287. He lost the fight by technical knockout in the first round.

Hooker faced Brian Ortega on 21 November 2026 at UFC Fight Night 294. He won the fight via unanimous decision.

== Personal life ==
Hooker ran and taught at his own gym, The Combat Academy in Auckland, New Zealand, which he has since closed to focus on his MMA career. In September 2021, Hooker announced that he was relocating to the United States due to problems he experienced with lockdown measures in New Zealand as well as obtaining a work visa to travel to the US from NZ. However, he continues to live and train out of Auckland, New Zealand.

He has one daughter, Zoe, who has featured alongside him in UFC Embedded vlogs and several of his social media posts.

On 25 October 2025, Hooker received his Black Belt in Brazilian jiu-jitsu.

== Championships and accomplishments ==
=== Mixed martial arts ===
- Ultimate Fighting Championship
  - Performance of the Night (Three times) vs. Hatsu Hioki, Ross Pearson and James Vick
  - Fight of the Night (Three times) vs. Paul Felder, Dustin Poirier and Mateusz Gamrot
  - UFC Honors Awards
    - 2020: President's Choice Fight of the Year Nominee vs. Dustin Poirier
    - 2024: President's Choice Fight of the Year Nominee vs. Mateusz Gamrot
  - UFC.com Awards
    - 2015: Ranked #8 Upset of the Year vs. Hatsu Hioki
    - 2020: Ranked #3 Fight of the Year vs. Dustin Poirier & Ranked #5 Fight of the Year vs. Paul Felder
    - 2023: Ranked #6 Fight of the Year vs. Jalin Turner
    - 2024: Ranked #8 Fight of the Year vs. Mateusz Gamrot
- Australian Fighting Championship
  - AFC Lightweight Championship (One time)
    - Two successful title defenses
- Supremacy Fighting Championships
  - New Zealand Lightweight Championship
- MMA Junkie
  - 2015 May Knockout of the Month vs. Hatsu Hioki
  - 2020 February Fight of the Month vs. Paul Felder
  - 2020 June Fight of the Month vs. Dustin Poirier
- ESPN
  - 2020 Round of the Year Round 2 vs. Dustin Poirier at UFC on ESPN: Poirier vs. Hooker
  - 2024 Most improved
- MMA Mania
  - 2024 #3 Ranked Fight of the Year vs. Mateusz Gamrot at UFC 305
- CBS Sports
  - 2020 #3 Ranked UFC Fight of the Year vs. Dustin Poirier
- LowKick MMA
  - 2023 Comeback of the Year vs. Jalin Turner at UFC 290
- Combat Press
  - 2024 Fight of the Year vs. Mateusz Gamrot at UFC 305

=== Kickboxing ===
- World Kickboxing Federation
  - WKBF X-Rules Welterweight Championship
- King in the Ring
  - King in the Ring Middleweight Championship

== Mixed martial arts record ==
Professional record breakdown
40 matches	25 wins	15 losses
By knockout	11	5
By submission	7	4
By decision	7	6

Res.	Record	Opponent	Method	Event	Date	Round	Time	Location	Notes
Win	25–15	Brian Ortega	Decision (unanimous)	UFC Fight Night: Procházka vs. Stirling	21 November 2026	3	5:00	Al Rayyan, Qatar	
Loss	24–15	Salahdine Parnasse	TKO (body kick and punches)	UFC Fight Night: Hooker vs. Parnasse	5 September 2026	1	2:35	Paris, France	
Loss	24–14	Benoît Saint Denis	TKO (elbows and punches)	UFC 325	1 February 2026	2	4:45	Sydney, Australia	
Loss	24–13	Arman Tsarukyan	Submission (arm-triangle choke)	UFC Fight Night: Tsarukyan vs. Hooker	22 November 2025	2	3:34	Al Rayyan, Qatar	
Win	24–12	Mateusz Gamrot	Decision (split)	UFC 305	18 August 2024	3	5:00	Perth, Australia	Fight of the Night.
Win	23–12	Jalin Turner	Decision (split)	UFC 290	8 July 2023	3	5:00	Las Vegas, Nevada, United States	Catchweight (158 lb) bout; Turner missed weight.
Win	22–12	Claudio Puelles	TKO (front kick to the body)	UFC 281	12 November 2022	2	4:06	New York City, New York, United States	
Loss	21–12	Arnold Allen	TKO (punches and elbows)	UFC Fight Night: Volkov vs. Aspinall	19 March 2022	1	2:33	London, England	Featherweight bout.
Loss	21–11	Islam Makhachev	Submission (kimura)	UFC 267	30 October 2021	1	2:25	Abu Dhabi, United Arab Emirates	
Win	21–10	Nasrat Haqparast	Decision (unanimous)	UFC 266	25 September 2021	3	5:00	Las Vegas, Nevada, United States	
Loss	20–10	Michael Chandler	TKO (punches)	UFC 257	24 January 2021	1	2:30	Abu Dhabi, United Arab Emirates	
Loss	20–9	Dustin Poirier	Decision (unanimous)	UFC on ESPN: Poirier vs. Hooker	27 June 2020	5	5:00	Las Vegas, Nevada, United States	Fight of the Night.
Win	20–8	Paul Felder	Decision (split)	UFC Fight Night: Felder vs. Hooker	23 February 2020	5	5:00	Auckland, New Zealand	Fight of the Night.
Win	19–8	Al Iaquinta	Decision (unanimous)	UFC 243	6 October 2019	3	5:00	Melbourne, Australia	
Win	18–8	James Vick	KO (punch)	UFC on ESPN: dos Anjos vs. Edwards	20 July 2019	1	2:33	San Antonio, Texas, United States	Performance of the Night.
Loss	17–8	Edson Barboza	KO (punch to the body)	UFC on Fox: Lee vs. Iaquinta 2	15 December 2018	3	2:19	Milwaukee, Wisconsin, United States	
Win	17–7	Gilbert Burns	KO (punch)	UFC 226	7 July 2018	1	2:28	Las Vegas, Nevada, United States	
Win	16–7	Jim Miller	KO (knee)	UFC Fight Night: Barboza vs. Lee	21 April 2018	1	3:00	Atlantic City, New Jersey, United States	
Win	15–7	Marc Diakiese	Submission (guillotine choke)	UFC 219	30 December 2017	3	0:42	Las Vegas, Nevada, United States	
Win	14–7	Ross Pearson	KO (knee)	UFC Fight Night: Lewis vs. Hunt	11 June 2017	2	3:02	Auckland, New Zealand	Return to Lightweight. Performance of the Night.
Loss	13–7	Jason Knight	Decision (unanimous)	UFC Fight Night: Whittaker vs. Brunson	27 November 2016	3	5:00	Melbourne, Australia	
Win	13–6	Mark Eddiva	Submission (guillotine choke)	UFC Fight Night: Hunt vs. Mir	20 March 2016	1	1:24	Brisbane, Australia	
Loss	12–6	Yair Rodríguez	Decision (unanimous)	UFC 192	3 October 2015	3	5:00	Houston, Texas, United States	
Win	12–5	Hatsu Hioki	KO (head kick and punches)	UFC Fight Night: Miocic vs. Hunt	10 May 2015	2	4:13	Adelaide, Australia	Performance of the Night.
Loss	11–5	Maximo Blanco	Decision (unanimous)	UFC Fight Night: Hunt vs. Nelson	20 September 2014	3	5:00	Saitama, Japan	
Win	11–4	Ian Entwistle	TKO (elbows)	UFC Fight Night: Te Huna vs. Marquardt	28 June 2014	1	3:34	Auckland, New Zealand	Return to Featherweight.
Win	10–4	Nick Patterson	TKO (punches)	Australian FC 6	24 August 2013	3	0:34	Melbourne, Australia	Defended the AFC Lightweight Championship.
Win	9–4	Rusty McBride	Submission (rear-naked choke)	Australian FC 5	10 May 2013	1	1:31	Melbourne, Australia	Defended the AFC Lightweight Championship.
Win	8–4	Sihle Khuboni	Submission (triangle choke)	Shuriken MMA: Clash of the Continents	13 October 2012	1	2:53	Auckland, New Zealand	Return to Lightweight.
Win	7–4	Wu Chengjie	TKO (doctor stoppage)	Legend FC 9	16 June 2012	1	3:44	Macau, SAR, China	Featherweight debut.
Win	6–4	Rusty McBride	TKO (doctor stoppage)	Australian FC 3	14 April 2012	2	3:57	Melbourne, Australia	Won the AFC Lightweight Championship.
Loss	5–4	Wu Haotian	Technical Submission (rear-naked choke)	Legend FC 8	30 March 2012	2	4:52	Hong Kong, SAR, China	
Win	5–3	Yuma Ishizuka	Decision (unanimous)	Australian FC 2	3 September 2011	3	5:00	Melbourne, Australia	
Win	4–3	Scott MacGregor	Submission (guillotine choke)	Supremacy Cage Fighting 8	30 July 2011	1	4:42	Auckland, New Zealand	Won the Supremacy FC South Pacific Lightweight Championship.
Loss	3–3	Rob Lisita	Decision (split)	Supremacy Cage Fighting 6	3 July 2010	3	5:00	Dunedin, New Zealand	For the Supremacy FC South Pacific Lightweight Championship.
Loss	3–2	Sonny Brown	Submission (rear-naked choke)	Rize MMA 4	27 March 2010	2	2:00	Fortitude Valley, Australia	
Win	3–1	Ken Yasuda	TKO (eye injury)	Rize MMA 3	5 December 2009	1	3:12	Mansfield, Australia	
Win	2–1	Adam Calver	Submission (armbar)	Supremacy Cage Fighting 4	14 November 2009	1	2:52	Auckland, New Zealand	
Loss	1–1	Adam Calver	Decision (split)	Supremacy Cage Fighting 3	25 July 2009	3	5:00	Auckland, New Zealand	
Win	1–0	Mike Taylor	Submission (rear-naked choke)	Supremacy Cage Fighting 2	7 March 2009	1	0:48	Auckland, New Zealand	Lightweight debut.

== Kickboxing record (incomplete) ==
Professional Kickboxing Record
9-1-3
Date	Result	Opponent	Event	Location	Method	Round	Time
2013-07-13	Win	(New Zealand) Edwin Samy	King in the Ring 72MAX, Final	Auckland, New Zealand	KO (left hook to the body)	1	0:55
Wins King in the Ring 72MAX Tournament title.
2013-07-13	Win	(New Zealand) Victor Mechkov	King in the Ring 72MAX, Semi Final	Auckland, New Zealand	KO (punches)	3	2:16
2013-07-13	Win	(New Zealand) Dawson Gray	King in the Ring 72MAX, Quarter Final	Auckland, New Zealand			
Legend: Win Loss Draw/No contest Notes

== See also ==
- List of current UFC fighters
- List of male mixed martial artists
