= Walt Harris (fighter) =

American mixed martial arts fighter

- Born: June 10, 1983 (age 43); Birmingham, Alabama, U.S.
- Other names: The Big Ticket
- Height: 6 ft 5 in (196 cm)
- Weight: 264 lb (120 kg; 18 st 12 lb)
- Division: Heavyweight
- Reach: 77 in (196 cm)
- Fighting out of: Birmingham, Alabama, United States
- Team: SBG Alabama – Spartan Fitness
- Years active: 2011–present

Mixed martial arts record
- Total: 24
- Wins: 13
- By knockout: 13
- Losses: 10
- By knockout: 5
- By submission: 1
- By decision: 3
- By disqualification: 1
- No contests: 1

Other information
- Mixed martial arts record from Sherdog

Walt Harris (born June 10, 1983) is an American mixed martial artist who competed in the Heavyweight division of the Ultimate Fighting Championship where he was a former Heavyweight contender. A professional since 2011, Harris has also formerly competed for Titan FC.

== Background ==
Before entering mixed martial arts in 2010, Harris was a basketball player at Jacksonville State University.

== Mixed martial arts career ==
=== Early career ===
Harris competed as an amateur from 2009 to 2010, compiling a record of 4–1. He made his professional debut on March 15, 2011, when he faced Justin Thornton at HEF: Hess Extreme Fighting. He won via first-round TKO, just sixteen seconds into the first round. Following this, Harris compiled a record of 6–1, with wins over Tony Melton and UFC veteran Anthony Hamilton, before signing with UFC in the fall of 2013.

=== Ultimate Fighting Championship ===
On September 19, 2013, it was announced that Harris had signed with the UFC, and he faced fellow newcomer Jared Rosholt at The Ultimate Fighter 18 Finale on November 30, 2013. Despite dropping Rosholt in the first round, Rosholt rallied back and Harris lost the fight via unanimous decision.

In his second fight with the promotion, Harris faced Nikita Krylov at UFC on Fox 10 on January 25, 2014. Though he was the considerable favorite coming into the bout, Harris was staggered by a head kick from Krylov, and after follow-up strikes on the ground from Krylov, he lost the bout via TKO, just 25 seconds into the first round. After dropping to 0–2 in the UFC, Harris was subsequently released from the promotion.

=== Titan Fighting Championship ===
Following his UFC release, Harris signed with Florida based promotion Titan FC. He faced D.J. Linderman at Titan FC 28 on May 16, 2014. He won the fight via first-round knockout. He was expected to face Dave Herman at Titan FC 30 on September 26, 2014. However, Harris pulled out of the bout due to a back injury and the fight was postponed.

The bout with Herman was rescheduled and was expected to take place on December 19, 2014. However, Harris resigned with the UFC, and he was replaced by Jon Madsen.

=== Return to UFC ===
After Daniel Omielańczuk was forced to pull out of his bout with Soa Palelei due to a thumb injury, Harris resigned with UFC and faced Palelei at UFC Fight Night 55 on November 7, 2014. He lost the fight via second-round TKO.

Harris faced promotional newcomer Cody East on April 23, 2016, at UFC 197. He won the fight via TKO in the first round.

Harris next faced Shamil Abdurakhimov on October 1, 2016, at UFC Fight Night 96. He lost the fight via split decision.

Harris faced Chase Sherman on January 15, 2017, at UFC Fight Night 103. He won the fight by knockout in the second round.

Harris made his next appearance against Cyril Asker on June 17, 2017, at UFC Fight Night 111. He won the fight early in the first round via TKO due to a combination of elbows and punches.

Harris was expected to face Mark Godbeer on October 7, 2017, at UFC 216 before a fight-day injury to Derrick Lewis took him out of his scheduled fight with Fabrício Werdum. As a result, Harris moved on to face Werdum, and Godbeer was pulled from the event. Harris lost the fight via submission in the first round.

The bout with Godbeer was quickly rescheduled and took place on November 4, 2017, at UFC 217. Harris lost the bout by disqualification after Harris hit Godbeer with a head kick following the referee calling a time out due to a groin strike.

Harris faced Daniel Spitz on June 1, 2018, at UFC Fight Night 131. He won the fight via knock out in the second round.

Harris faced Andrei Arlovski on December 29, 2018, at UFC 232. He won the fight via split decision. It was reported on January 26, 2019, that Harris tested positive for LGD4033, and selective androgen receptor modulators (SARMs) like ostarine, and he was temporarily suspended by California State Athletic Commission (CSAC). In February, Harris was suspended for four months and fined $4,000. The fight result was overturned to a no contest. Per the CSAC, Harris was able to prove the positive test resulted from a tainted supplement and the commission does not believe he was an intentional doper, hence the shorter suspension.

Harris was expected to face Alexey Oleynik on May 4, 2019, at UFC Fight Night 151. However, on April 3, 2019, it was announced that Oleinik would face Alistair Overeem at UFC Fight Night 149 after Alexander Volkov withdrew from the event. He was replaced by Serghei Spivac. Harris won the fight via TKO in the first round. This fight earned Harris his first Performance of the Night bonus award.

The bout between Harris and Oleynik was rescheduled and took place on July 20, 2019, at UFC on ESPN 4. Harris won the fight via knockout just 12 seconds into the first round. This win earned Harris his second consecutive Performance of the Night bonus.

Harris was expected to face Alistair Overeem on December 7, 2019, at UFC on ESPN 7. However, Harris pulled out on November 1, 2019, due to the ongoing search for his missing step-daughter.

Harris was expected to face Alistair Overeem on April 11, 2020, at UFC Fight Night: Overeem vs. Harris. The pairing was previously scheduled to headline UFC on ESPN 7 in December 2019. Due to the COVID-19 pandemic, the event was eventually postponed. The match was rescheduled to May 16, 2020, at UFC on ESPN: Overeem vs. Harris. Despite hurting, and almost finishing Overeem in the first round, Harris went on to lose via second-round TKO.

Harris faced Alexander Volkov on October 24, 2020 at UFC 254. He lost the fight via technical knockout in round two.

Harris faced Marcin Tybura on June 5, 2021, at UFC Fight Night: Rozenstruik vs. Sakai. He lost the fight via TKO in round one.

Harris was scheduled to face Tai Tuivasa on October 30, 2021, at UFC 267. However, Harris pulled out of the bout for unknown reasons.

After a 2-year layoff, Harris was scheduled to face Josh Parisian on July 15, 2023, at UFC on ESPN 49. However, the bout was scrapped by Combat Sports Anti-Doping (CSAD) due to a potential anti-doping policy violation by Harris. He was given a 4-year suspension and will be eligible to compete again on July 11, 2027.

On March 27, 2025, it was reported that Harris was removed from the UFC roster.

== Politics ==
Harris ran for a city council seat in Homewood, Alabama, in 2020 but finished 3rd in the race with 24 percent of the vote.

== Personal life ==
Harris worked as a furniture mover and also worked for UPS prior to becoming an MMA fighter. Harris is married to Angela Haley-Harris, they have four children. They are currently living in Homewood, Alabama, where their children attend school.

=== Murder of stepdaughter ===
At the end of October 2019, news surfaced that Harris's stepdaughter, Aniah Blanchard, was reported missing on October 24, 2019. Soon after, Auburn police revealed that after finding evidence from Blanchard's vehicle, they suspected foul play regarding the disappearance. Subsequently, Alabama Governor Kay Ivey set up a reward of $5,000 for information leading to the arrest and conviction of the perpetrator, which was matched by an anonymous donor. Additionally, the UFC President Dana White and former UFC champion Jon Jones upped the ante by contributing $25,000 per person for the information. The reward sum exceeded $100,000.

On November 6, 2019, the Auburn police department released surveillance footage from an Auburn convenience store, presenting the person suspected in the disappearance, later identified as Ibraheem Yazeed, a repeat offender. On November 8, 2019, Yazeed was captured as an out-of-state fugitive in Escambia County, Florida, and was extradited to Auburn. On November 20, 2019, Yazeed was charged with first-degree kidnapping in an Alabama court, and remains in jail without bond. On November 25, 2019, an Alabama district attorney announced that they had found the remains of a girl they believe to be Aniah Blanchard in neighboring Macon County. Blanchard's remains were identified on November 27, 2019. In late November 2019, two additional suspects, Antwain Fisher and David Lee Johnson Jr., were arrested and charged with first-degree kidnapping and hindering prosecution, respectively. In December however, Fisher's charges were dropped with prejudice in Lee county. On November 28, 2019, police reports confirmed that the body found was indeed Harris's step daughter and an autopsy confirmed that Blanchard was killed by a gunshot wound. At the same time, the district attorney announced that capital murder charges were filed against Yazeed. In late 2022, Yazeed was indicted with three counts of capital murder and could face death penalty or life sentence without parole for each, should he be convicted, and the trial date was set on March 2, 2026. Yazeed was eventually found guilty of lesser charges of murder and felony murder in March 2026, and sentenced to two concurrent life sentences in May 2026.

== Championships and accomplishments ==
=== Mixed martial arts ===
- Ultimate Fighting Championship
  - Performance of the Night (Two times) vs. Serghei Spivac and Aleksei Oleinik
- MMA Sucka
  - 2020 Comeback Fighter of the Year
- Amateur Boxing
  - Golden Gloves Championship (Alabama)
  - Golden Gloves Championship (Georgia)

== Mixed martial arts record ==
Professional record breakdown
24 matches	13 wins	10 losses
By knockout	13	5
By submission	0	1
By decision	0	3
By disqualification	0	1
No contests	1	

Res.	Record	Opponent	Method	Event	Date	Round	Time	Location	Notes
Loss	13–10 (1)	Marcin Tybura	TKO (punches)	UFC Fight Night: Rozenstruik vs. Sakai	June 5, 2021	1	4:06	Las Vegas, Nevada, United States	
Loss	13–9 (1)	Alexander Volkov	TKO (body kick and punches)	UFC 254	October 24, 2020	2	1:15	Abu Dhabi, United Arab Emirates	
Loss	13–8 (1)	Alistair Overeem	TKO (punches)	UFC on ESPN: Overeem vs. Harris	May 16, 2020	2	3:00	Jacksonville, Florida, United States	
Win	13–7 (1)	Aleksei Oleinik	KO (knee and punches)	UFC on ESPN: dos Anjos vs. Edwards	July 20, 2019	1	0:12	San Antonio, Texas, United States	Performance of the Night.
Win	12–7 (1)	Serghei Spivac	TKO (punches)	UFC Fight Night: Iaquinta vs. Cowboy	May 4, 2019	1	0:50	Ottawa, Ontario, Canada	Performance of the Night.
NC	11–7 (1)	Andrei Arlovski	NC (overturned)	UFC 232	December 29, 2018	3	5:00	Inglewood, California, United States	Originally a split decision win for Harris; overturned after he tested positive for LGD-4033.
Win	11–7	Daniel Spitz	KO (punches)	UFC Fight Night: Rivera vs. Moraes	June 1, 2018	2	4:59	Utica, New York, United States	
Loss	10–7	Mark Godbeer	DQ (illegal kick)	UFC 217	November 4, 2017	1	4:29	New York City, New York, United States	
Loss	10–6	Fabrício Werdum	Submission (armbar)	UFC 216	October 7, 2017	1	1:05	Las Vegas, Nevada, United States	
Win	10–5	Cyril Asker	TKO (punches and elbows)	UFC Fight Night: Holm vs. Correia	June 17, 2017	1	1:44	Kallang, Singapore	
Win	9–5	Chase Sherman	KO (knee and punches)	UFC Fight Night: Rodríguez vs. Penn	January 15, 2017	2	2:41	Phoenix, Arizona, United States	
Loss	8–5	Shamil Abdurakhimov	Decision (split)	UFC Fight Night: Lineker vs. Dodson	October 1, 2016	3	5:00	Portland, Oregon, United States	
Win	8–4	Cody East	TKO (punches)	UFC 197	April 23, 2016	1	4:18	Las Vegas, Nevada, United States	
Loss	7–4	Soa Palelei	TKO (punches)	UFC Fight Night: Rockhold vs. Bisping	November 7, 2014	2	4:49	Sydney, Australia	
Win	7–3	D.J. Linderman	KO (punches)	Titan FC 28	May 16, 2014	1	4:12	Newkirk, Oklahoma, United States	
Loss	6–3	Nikita Krylov	TKO (head kick and punches)	UFC on Fox: Henderson vs. Thomson	January 25, 2014	1	0:25	Chicago, Illinois, United States	
Loss	6–2	Jared Rosholt	Decision (unanimous)	The Ultimate Fighter: Team Rousey vs. Team Tate Finale	November 30, 2013	3	5:00	Las Vegas, Nevada, United States	
Win	6–1	Tony Melton	TKO (punches)	Strike Hard Productions 24	June 15, 2013	1	2:00	Birmingham, Alabama, United States	
Win	5–1	Josh Robertson	TKO (punches)	Strike Hard Productions 20	December 8, 2012	1	1:06	Birmingham, Alabama, United States	
Win	4–1	Anthony Hamilton	KO (punches)	Superior Cage Combat 4: Grove vs. Silva	February 16, 2012	1	1:15	Las Vegas, Nevada, United States	
Win	3–1	Cedric James	KO (punches)	Fight Time 7: The Return	October 7, 2011	1	0:22	Fort Lauderdale, Florida, United States	
Win	2–1	Wes Little	KO (punch)	Fight Force International: Blood & Sand 9	May 7, 2011	1	1:54	Biloxi, Mississippi, United States	
Loss	1–1	Chris Barnett	Decision (unanimous)	World Extreme Fighting 46	April 22, 2011	3	5:00	Orlando, Florida, United States	
Win	1–0	Justin Thornton	TKO (punches)	Hess Extreme Fighting	March 15, 2011	1	0:16	Panama City Beach, Florida, United States	

== See also ==
- List of male mixed martial artists
