= Daniel Spitz =

American mixed martial arts fighter

- Born: July 31, 1990 (age 36); Spokane, Washington, U.S.
- Other names: Daddy Long Legs
- Height: 6 ft 7 in (2.01 m)
- Weight: 110.5 kg (244 lb; 17 st 6 lb)
- Division: Heavyweight
- Reach: 82 in (208 cm)
- Fighting out of: Spokane, Washington, U.S.
- Team: Sikjitsu
- Trainer: Rick Little -Coach
- Years active: 2013–2019

Mixed martial arts record
- Total: 9
- Wins: 6
- By knockout: 2
- By submission: 3
- By decision: 1
- Losses: 3
- By knockout: 1
- By decision: 2

Other information
- University: Washington State University
- Mixed martial arts record from Sherdog

Daniel Spitz (born July 31, 1990) is a retired American mixed martial artist. A professional competitor from 2013 until 2019, he competed for King of the Cage and the UFC.

== Background ==
Spitz was born in Spokane, Washington, United States. He attended Mead High School, where he starred in football as a defensive lineman and tight end. Spitz later continued playing football as an offensive lineman for Washington State University, weighing 302 lbs. at the time, and earned a degree in Psychology. After his collegiate football career was over, he transitioned to MMA as he wanted to stay physically active. He trained under Rick Little and competed in his first amateur fight after one month of training. He was instantly hooked after his fight competition and never looked back since. He trains at Sikjitsu in Spokane, and his teammates are UFC fighters Michael Chiesa, Julianna Pena, and Sam Sicilia.

== Mixed martial arts career ==
=== Early career ===
After compiling a 5-1 amateur record, Spitz fought all his fights in the United States for Excite Fight, King of the Cage (KOTC) and Conquest of the Cage (COTC) promotions. His notable win came over former notable UFC veteran Wesley Correira and he amassed a record of 5-0 prior to joining the UFC.

=== Ultimate Fighting Championship ===
In his UFC debut, Spitz faced Mark Godbeer, replacing Todd Duffee, on a 9-day notice, on March 4, 2017, at UFC 209 in Las Vegas. He lost the fight via unanimous decision.

On September 16, 2017, Spitz stepped into the octagon for his second UFC fight against Anthony Hamilton at UFC Fight Night 116. He won the fight via technical knockout in 24 seconds on round one.

Spitz faced Walt Harris on June 1, 2018, at UFC Fight Night 131. He lost the fight via in second round.

Spitz was scheduled to face Jeff Hughes on March 9, 2019, at UFC on ESPN+ 4. However, Spitz pulled out of the fight in February citing injury and Maurice Greene replaced him.

Spitz faced promotional newcomer Tanner Boser on October 18, 2019, at UFC on ESPN 6. He lost the fight via unanimous decision. Spitz was subsequently released from the promotion.

The UFC released Spitz on February 11, 2020.

== Personal life ==
Spitz went to Washington State University and earned a degree in Psychology and a minor in businesses study. He worked full-time at Starbucks and part-time as a bouncer prior signed by UFC. Spitz loves water related sport activities and he is a boxing fan.

== Mixed martial arts record ==
Professional record breakdown
9 matches	6 wins	3 losses
By knockout	2	1
By submission	3	0
By decision	1	2

Res.	Record	Opponent	Method	Event	Date	Round	Time	Location	Notes
Loss	6–3	Tanner Boser	Decision (unanimous)	UFC on ESPN: Reyes vs. Weidman	October 18, 2019	3	5:00	Boston, Massachusetts, United States	
Loss	6–2	Walt Harris	TKO (punches)	UFC Fight Night: Rivera vs. Moraes	June 1, 2018	2	4:59	Utica, New York, United States	
Win	6–1	Anthony Hamilton	TKO (punches)	UFC Fight Night: Rockhold vs. Branch	September 16, 2017	1	0:24	Pittsburgh, Pennsylvania, United States	
Loss	5–1	Mark Godbeer	Decision (unanimous)	UFC 209	March 17, 2017	3	5:00	Las Vegas, Nevada, United States	
Win	5–0	Colton Vaughn	TKO (injury)	KOTC: Fall Out	November 17, 2016	1	0:06	Worley, Idaho, United States	
Win	4–0	Wesley Correira	Decision (unanimous)	RWE: Just Scrap	April 22, 2016	3	5:00	Hilo, Hawaii, United States	
Win	3–0	Trandon Benson	Submission (rear-naked choke)	Conquest of the Cage 21	March 18, 2016	1	1:26	Airway Heights, Washington, United States	
Win	2–0	David Lewis	Submission (guillotine choke)	Conquest of the Cage 21	November 6, 2015	1	1:28	Airway Heights, Washington, United States	
Win	1–0	Matt Kovacs	Submission (arm-triangle choke)	ExciteFight: Summer Showdown 2	July 18, 2015	1	3:45	Tulalip, Washington, United States	

== See also ==
- List of current UFC fighters
- List of male mixed martial artists
