= Mark Godbeer =

English bare-knuckle boxer and mixed martial arts (MMA) fighter

- Born: Mark Godbeer; 22 November 1983 (age 42); Taunton, England
- Nickname: The Hand Of
- Nationality: English
- Height: 6 ft 4 in (193 cm)
- Weight: 246 lb (112 kg; 17 st 8 lb)
- Division: Heavyweight; Light Heavyweight
- Reach: 75 in (191 cm)
- Fighting out of: Bridgwater, England
- Team: All or Nothing MMA
- Trainer: Arthur Meek
- Years active: 2009–2018 (MMA), 2019-present (bare-knuckle boxing)

Mixed martial arts record
- Total: 18
- Wins: 13
- By knockout: 9
- By submission: 2
- By decision: 1
- By disqualification: 1
- Losses: 5
- By knockout: 3
- By submission: 2

Other information
- Mixed martial arts record from Sherdog
- Last updated on: 9 February 2017

Mark Godbeer (born 22 November 1983) is an English bare-knuckle boxer and former mixed martial artist. A professional MMA competitor from 2009 until 2018, he competed for the UFC, Bellator MMA, Absolute Championship Akhmat, and BAMMA. He is a former BAMMA heavyweight champion. In bare-knuckle boxing, he is a former Valor heavyweight champion, and a BKB British heavyweight champion.

== Early life ==
Starting training in MMA relatively late at the age of 25, Godbeer originally ran his own plastering business before focusing on mixed martial arts.

== Mixed martial arts career ==
=== Early career ===
Godbeer made his professional MMA debut on 7 August 2009 with a TKO victory over Sam Hooker. While fighting for numerous regional promotions, he amassed a record of 7–1 with all victories coming by way of knockout or submission. Following this, he was signed by BAMMA in 2012 to compete in their heavyweight division.

=== BAMMA and Bellator MMA ===
Between March 2012 and May 2016, Godbeer would remain undefeated in the BAMMA cage. During this time, he also signed on with Bellator MMA and would make a single appearance for the promotion, facing notable heavyweight Cheick Kongo on 4 October 2013 at Bellator 102. Following that loss, Godbeer would claim three straight victories in BAMMA, including winning the world heavyweight title against Paul Taylor on 13 June 2015. During this run he would announce a brief retirement from MMA due to injury, but ended that retirement in May 2016 to defend the BAMMA heavyweight title.

=== Ultimate Fighting Championship ===
Godbeer signed with the UFC in September 2016.

He made his promotional debut on 19 November 2016 against Justin Ledet at UFC Fight Night 99. He would lose the bout via submission in the first round.

Godbeer was expected to face Todd Duffee on 4 March 2017, at UFC 209. However, Duffee pulled out of the fight in mid-February for undisclosed reasons. He was replaced by promotional newcomer Daniel Spitz. Godbeer would win the bout via unanimous decision.

Godbeer was expected to face Walt Harris on 7 October 2017 at UFC 216 before a fight-day injury to Derrick Lewis took him out of his scheduled fight with Fabricio Werdum. As a result, Harris was moved on to face Werdum, and Godbeer was pulled from the event.

The bout with Harris was rescheduled for 4 November 2017 at UFC 217. Godbeer won the fight via disqualification after Harris hit Godbeer with a head kick following the referee called a time out due to a groin strike.

Godbeer was expected to face promotional newcomer Dmitry Poberezhets on 17 March 2018 at UFC Fight Night 127. However, it was announced on 25 January 2018 Poberezhets was injured and he was replaced by Dmitriy Sosnovskiy. Godbeer lost the fight via submission in the second round.

Godbeer was briefly scheduled to face Luis Henrique in his return to light heavyweight division on 22 September 2018 at UFC Fight Night 137. However, Godbeer pulled out of the fight in early August, citing injury, and was replaced by promotional newcomer Ryan Spann. Godbeer announced his retirement on 25 September 2018 .

== Bare-knuckle boxing ==
=== Valor Bare Knuckle ===
Mark Godbeer, while retired from MMA, transitioned over to bare-knuckle boxing and entered Ken Shamrock's newly founded Valor Bare Knuckle for its debut event, VBK: 1. Godbeer knocked out former fellow UFC, Bellator, & BAMMA veteran Jack "The Outlaw" May. Goddbeer knocked May out in less than a minute. He then faced current Road FC Open-weight Champion Mighty Mo in the main event for the tournament championship. Godbeer defeated Mo when after a series of punches Mo was knocked down and unable to get up in time for the 10 count, winning the VBK tournament.

=== Bare Knuckle Fighting Championship ===
On September 5, 2020, it was announced that Godbeer had signed with the Bare Knuckle Fighting Championship.

Godbeer was scheduled to face Sam Shewmaker at BKFC 15 on December 11, 2020. However, after testing positive for COVID-19, Godbeer withdrew from the fight and was replaced by Bobo O'Bannon. He was then scheduled to face Mick Terrill at BKFC 17 on April 30, 2021. However, Godbeer withdrew from the fight for unknown reasons.

=== BYB Extreme ===
Mark Godbeer was set to face Josh Burns for the Police Gazette World Diamond super heavyweight belt at BYB 9 on March 12, 2022. However, Godbeer withdrew for unknown reasons.

=== Gromda ===
In 2022, it was announced that Godbeer had signed with Polish bare-knuckle promotion Gromda. He made his debut on June 10, 2022 against Bartłomiej Domalik for the Gromda International Openweight Championship, losing by second-round TKO.

=== Return to Valor Bare Knuckle ===
Godbeer was scheduled to face Lavar Johnson in his return to Valor Bare Knuckle at Valor Bare Knuckle 2 on October 27, 2023. However, Godbeer withdrew for personal reasons.

== Championships and achievements ==
=== Mixed martial arts ===
- BAMMA
  - BAMMA World Heavyweight Champion (One time)
  - BAMMA British Heavyweight Champion (One time)

=== Bare-knuckle boxing ===
- Warlords Promotions
  - UBBF British Heavyweight Champion (One time)
- Valor Bare Knuckle
  - Valor Heavyweight Tournament Champion (One time)
- Bare Knuckle Boxing
  - BKB British Heavyweight Champion (One time)

== Mixed martial arts record ==
Professional record breakdown
| 18 matches | 13 wins | 5 losses |
| By knockout | 9 | 3 |
| By submission | 2 | 2 |
| By decision | 1 | 0 |
| By disqualification | 1 | 0 |
| Draws | 0 | |

| Res. | Record | Opponent | Method | Event | Date | Round | Time | Location | Notes |
|---|---|---|---|---|---|---|---|---|---|
| Loss | 13–5 | Sergey Bilostenniy | TKO (punches) | ACA 95: Tumenov vs. Abdulaev | 27 April 2019 | 1 | 2:04 | Moscow, Russia | |
| Loss | 13–4 | Dmitriy Sosnovskiy | Submission (rear-naked choke) | UFC Fight Night: Werdum vs. Volkov | 17 March 2018 | 2 | 4:29 | London, England | |
| Win | 13–3 | Walt Harris | DQ (illegal kick) | UFC 217 | 4 November 2017 | 1 | 4:29 | New York City, New York, United States | |
| Win | 12–3 | Daniel Spitz | Decision (unanimous) | UFC 209 | 4 March 2017 | 3 | 5:00 | Las Vegas, Nevada, United States | |
| Loss | 11–3 | Justin Ledet | Submission (rear-naked choke) | UFC Fight Night: Mousasi vs. Hall 2 | 19 November 2016 | 1 | 2:16 | Belfast, Northern Ireland | |
| Win | 11–2 | Stuart Austin | TKO (punches) | BAMMA 25: Champion vs. Champion | 14 May 2016 | 2 | 1:24 | Birmingham, England | Defended the BAMMA World Heavyweight Championship. Won the BAMMA British Heavyweight Championship. |
| Win | 10–2 | Paul Taylor | TKO (retirement) | BAMMA 21: DeVent vs. Kone | 13 June 2015 | 2 | 4:43 | Birmingham, England | Won the inaugural BAMMA World Heavyweight Championship. |
| Win | 9–2 | Thomas Denham | TKO (punches) | BAMMA 19: Petley vs. Stapleton | 28 March 2015 | 1 | 1:33 | Blackpool, England | |
| Loss | 8–2 | Cheick Kongo | TKO (knees and punches) | Bellator 102 | 4 October 2013 | 2 | 2:04 | Visalia, California, United States | Bellator Season 9 Heavyweight Tournament Semi-Final |
| Win | 8–1 | Catalin Zmarandescu | TKO (corner stoppage) | BAMMA 9: Watson vs. Marshman | 24 March 2012 | 1 | 5:00 | Birmingham, England | |
| Loss | 7–1 | Anthony Taylor | TKO (punches) | Supremacy Fight Challenge 4 | 20 November 2011 | 2 | 1:22 | Gateshead, England | Return to Heavyweight |
| Win | 7–0 | Tomas Vaicickas | TKO (punches) | Pain Pit Fight Night 1 | 3 September 2011 | 1 | 0:19 | Newport, Wales | |
| Win | 6–0 | Malik Merad | Submission (guillotine choke) | Head to Head: The Big Guns | 21 November 2010 | 2 | 3:00 | North Petherton, England | |
| Win | 5–0 | Chris Konieczny | TKO (kick to the body and punches) | Tear Up 4: Clash of the Giants | 2 October 2010 | 2 | 0:46 | Bristol, England | |
| Win | 4–0 | Fraser Opie | Submission (guillotine choke) | South West FC 1 | 22 August 2010 | 1 | 3:26 | Torquay England | Return to Light Heavyweight |
| Win | 3–0 | Paul Pestell | TKO (punches) | All or Nothing: Head to Head | 5 June 2010 | 1 | 1:00 | Bridgwater, England | Heavyweight debut |
| Win | 2–0 | Ibrar Malik | TKO (punches) | Bristol Fight Club: Fight Night | 8 March 2010 | 2 | 2:20 | South Gloucestershire, England | |
| Win | 1–0 | Sam Hooker | TKO (punches) | KnuckleUp MMA 2: Beer vs. Jazbutis | 9 August 2009 | 2 | 0:00 | Wells, England | |

== Bare-knuckle boxing record ==
Professional record breakdown
| 7 matches | 6 wins | 1 loss |
| By knockout | 5 | 1 |
| By decision | 1 | 0 |
| By disqualification | 0 | 0 |
| Draws | 0 | |

| Res. | Record | Opponent | Method | Event | Date | Round | Time | Location | Notes |
|---|---|---|---|---|---|---|---|---|---|
| Win | 6–1 | Dean Rees | KO | Warlords 4 | 21 September 2019 | 2 | 0:15 | Bridgwater, UK, Blake Hall | Defended the UBBF British Heavyweight Championship. |
| Win | 5–1 | Aaron Ashton | KO | Warlords 2 | 4 March 2025 | 2 | 0:20 | Bridgwater, UK, Blake Hall | Defended the UBBF British Heavyweight Championship. |
| Win | 4–1 | Stephan Hughes | TKO | Warlords 1 | 16 November 2024 | 1 | 0:39 | Bridgwater, UK, Blake Hall | For the UBBF British Heavyweight Championship. |
| Loss | 3–1 | Bartłomiej Domalik | TKO (punches) | Gromda 9: Balboa vs. Godbeer | 10 June 2022 | 2 | 0:55 | Pionki, Poland, Gromda Fight Club | For Gromda International Openweight Championship. |
| Win | 3–0 | Mighty Mo | TKO (stoppage) | VBK-Valor Bare Knuckle 1 | 21 September 2019 | 1 | 2:56 | New Town, ND, USA, 4 Bears Casino and Lodge | VBK Heavyweight Tournament Final. |
| Win | 2–0 | Jack "The Outlaw" May | KO (punch) | VBK-Valor Bare Knuckle 1 | 21 September 2019 | 1 | 0:50 | New Town, ND, USA, 4 Bears Casino and Lodge | VBK Heavyweight Tournament Semi-Final. |
| Win | 1–0 | Mickey Parker | Decision (Unanimous) | BKB 16 | 30 March 2019 | 5 | 2:00 | London, England, O2 Arena | Won BKB British Heavyweight Championship. |

== See also ==
- List of current UFC fighters
- List of male mixed martial artists
- List of male kickboxers
