= UFC Fight Night: Santos vs. Anders =

UFC mixed martial arts event in 2018

- The poster for UFC Fight Night: Santos vs. Anders
- Promotion: Ultimate Fighting Championship
- Date: September 22, 2018
- Venue: Ginásio do Ibirapuera
- City: São Paulo, Brazil
- Attendance: 9,485

Event chronology
UFC Fight Night: Hunt vs. Oleinik	UFC Fight Night: Santos vs. Anders	UFC 229: Khabib vs. McGregor

UFC Fight Night: Santos vs. Anders (also known as UFC Fight Night 137) was a mixed martial arts event produced by the Ultimate Fighting Championship held on September 22, 2018 at Ginásio do Ibirapuera in São Paulo, Brazil.

== Background ==
A light heavyweight bout between former UFC Light Heavyweight Championship challenger Glover Teixeira and Jimi Manuwa was expected to serve as the event headliner. However, Teixeira pulled out on August 14 due to a shoulder injury. He was replaced by Thiago Santos. In turn, Manuwa pulled out on September 16 due to a torn hamstring and was replaced by Eryk Anders.

Mark Godbeer was briefly scheduled to face Luis Henrique at the event. However, Godbeer pulled out of the fight in early August citing injury and was replaced by promotional newcomer Ryan Spann.

Neil Magny was scheduled to face Alex Oliveira at the event. However Magny was removed from the pairing on August 22 in favor of a matchup with Santiago Ponzinibbio in November at UFC Fight Night: Magny vs. Ponzinibbio. He was replaced by Carlo Pedersoli Jr.

Ketlen Vieira was expected to face former Invicta FC Bantamweight Champion and UFC Women's Featherweight Championship challenger Tonya Evinger at the event. However on August 7, Vieira pulled out due to a knee injury. Evinger was removed from the card and then rescheduled for a future event against a different opponent.

The Ultimate Fighter: Nations middleweight winner Elias Theodorou was expected to face The Ultimate Fighter: Brazil 3 heavyweight winner Antônio Carlos Júnior at the event. However, Júnior pulled out on August 28 due to injury. The pairing was left intact and rescheduled for UFC 231.

Elizeu Zaleski dos Santos was expected to face Belal Muhammad at the event. However on September 14, it was announced that Muhammad pulled out due to injury and was replaced by promotional newcomer Luigi Vendramini.

At the weigh-ins, former UFC Bantamweight Champion Renan Barão weighed in at 141.6 pounds, 5 pounds over the bantamweight non-title fight limit of 136. Barão was fined 30 percent of his purse, which went to his opponent Andre Ewell.

== Results ==
Main Card (Fox Sports 1)
Weight class				Method	Round	Time	Notes
Light Heavyweight	Thiago Santos	def.	Eryk Anders	TKO (referee stoppage)	3	5:00
Welterweight	Alex Oliveira	def.	Carlo Pedersoli Jr.	KO (punches)	1	0:39
Light Heavyweight	Antônio Rogério Nogueira	def.	Sam Alvey	TKO (punches)	2	1:00
Catchweight (141.6 lb)	Andre Ewell	def.	Renan Barão	Decision (split) (29–28, 28–29, 29–28)	3	5:00
Women's Strawweight	Randa Markos	vs.	Marina Rodriguez	Draw (majority) (29–28, 28–28, 28–28)	3	5:00
Preliminary Card (Fox Sports 2)
Lightweight	Charles Oliveira	def.	Christos Giagos	Submission (rear-naked choke)	2	3:22
Lightweight	Francisco Trinaldo	def.	Evan Dunham	KO (knee to the body)	2	4:10
Light Heavyweight	Ryan Spann	def.	Luis Henrique	Decision (unanimous) (30–27, 30–27, 29–28)	3	5:00
Heavyweight	Augusto Sakai	def.	Chase Sherman	TKO (punches)	3	4:03
Preliminary Card (UFC Fight Pass)
Welterweight	Sérgio Moraes	def.	Ben Saunders	Submission (arm-triangle choke)	2	4:42
Women's Flyweight	Mayra Bueno Silva	def.	Gillian Robertson	Submission (armbar)	1	4:55
Middleweight	Thales Leites	def.	Héctor Lombard	Decision (unanimous) (29–28, 29–28, 29–28)	3	5:00
Welterweight	Elizeu Zaleski dos Santos	def.	Luigi Vendramini	KO (flying knee and punches)	2	1:20
Women's Strawweight	Lívia Renata Souza	def.	Alex Chambers	Submission (guillotine choke)	1	1:21

== Bonus awards ==
The following fighters received $50,000 bonuses:

- Fight of the Night: Thiago Santos vs. Eryk Anders
- Performance of the Night: Antônio Rogério Nogueira and Charles Oliveira

== See also ==
- List of UFC events
- 2018 in UFC
- List of current UFC fighters
