= Alexander Volkov (fighter) =

Russian mixed martial artist (born 1988)

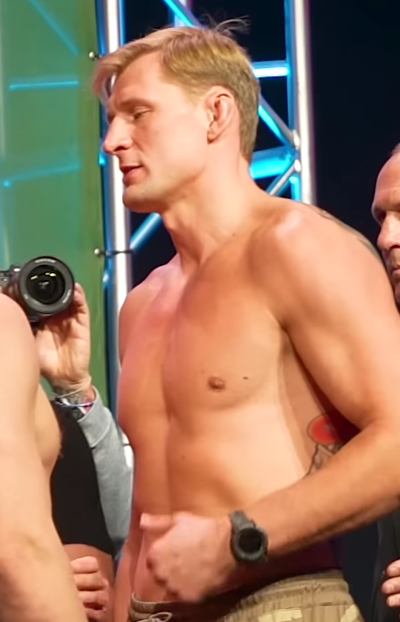
- Volkov at the UFC on ABC: Whittaker vs. Aliskerov face-off
- Born: Alexander Yevgenyevich Volkov; 24 October 1988 (age 38); Moscow, Russian SFSR, Soviet Union
- Native name: Александр Волков
- Other names: Drago
- Nationality: Russian
- Height: 6 ft 7 in (201 cm)
- Weight: 257 lb (117 kg; 18 st 5 lb)
- Division: Heavyweight
- Reach: 80 in (203 cm)
- Fighting out of: Moscow, Russia
- Team: Strela Team
- Rank: 3rd dan Black belt in Tsu Shin Gen; Brown belt in Kyokushin Karate; Black belt in Brazilian Jiu-Jitsu
- Years active: 2009–present

Mixed martial arts record
- Total: 52
- Wins: 41
- By knockout: 24
- By submission: 4
- By decision: 13
- Losses: 11
- By knockout: 2
- By submission: 3
- By decision: 6

Other information
- Mixed martial arts record from Sherdog

Alexander Yevgenyevich Volkov (Russian: Александр Евгеньевич Волков; born 24 October 1988) is a Russian professional mixed martial artist. He currently competes in the Heavyweight division of the Ultimate Fighting Championship (UFC). A professional since 2009, Volkov previously competed for the M-1 Global promotion, as well as Bellator MMA. He is a former heavyweight champion in both promotions. As of October 24, 2026, he is #2 in the Meta UFC heavyweight rankings.

== Mixed martial arts career ==
=== M-1 Global ===
In 2008 Volkov signed with M-1 Global. His professional MMA debut came in April 2009 when he defeated Nikolay Pleshakov by TKO in just 80 seconds. Volkov followed this up a month later with another TKO victory, this time against Adam Alikhanov in just 20 seconds. A further month later, Volkov suffered his first professional loss at the hands of Akhmed Sultanov. Midway through the first round, Volkov was forced to tap to an armbar. Volkov then went on a two-fight win streak, both via TKO.

In December 2009, after just eight months as a professional fighter, Volkov faced Ibragim Magomedov at M-1 Challenge 20 - 2009 Finals. Coming in as an underdog, his team simply wanted him to make it through all three rounds, but Volkov exceeded expectations by winning via unanimous decision. Volkov was awarded an M-1 Global ring "as a reward for exceptional performance".

Volkov faced Denis Smoldarev on February 19, 2016, M-1 Challenge 64 for the vacant M-1 Global Heavyweight title, he won the fight via submission (triangle choke).

Volkov faced former Bellator light heavyweight champion Attila Végh on June 16, 2016, at M-1 Challenge 68. He won the fight via knockout in the first round. This and other fights of Alexander Volkov in the M-1 league can be viewed in the All fights of Alexander Volkov in M-1 Global of the M-1 Global TV channel.

==== M-1 Eastern European Tournament ====
Within his first year of professional competition, Volkov was competing in the M-1 Eastern European tournament, taking victories in the opening round and the semi-final. Volkov progressed to the M-1 Selection 2010 - Eastern Europe Finals, where a win would put him in line to challenge for the M-1 Global Heavyweight title at the 2010 M-1 Challenge Season events. To reach the championship fight, Volkov first had to take on Maxim Grishin to become the Eastern Europe champion. Unfortunately for Volkov, he fell prey to a rear-naked choke early in the opening round and was eliminated.

=== Post M-1 Eastern European Tournament ===
Less than a month later, Volkov took his first fight outside of M-1 in nearly a year. His opponent was the debuting Eldar Yagudin, who he defeated inside the opening round by TKO (punches).

On August 5, 2011, as part of League-70 Russia vs Brazil, held in Sochi, Russia, Alexander Volkov defeated the undefeated at that time Bulgarian Nedyalko Karadzhov via TKO in the opening round.

=== Bellator MMA ===
In September 2012, it was announced that Volkov would compete for Bellator Fighting Championships. He made his U.S. debut in the Bellator season seven heavyweight tournament. In the opening, quarter-final round he faced Brett Rogers at Bellator 75. Volkov dominated the fight by making the most of his reach advantage. Volkov won via unanimous decision. In the semifinals at Bellator 80, he faced Vinicius Queiroz and won via TKO in the second round. On December 14, Volkov fought Richard Hale in a 5-round fight for Bellator Season 7 Heavyweight Tournament Final and Bellator Heavyweight Championship. Volkov won via unanimous decision.

In his first title defense, Volkov faced Vitaly Minakov in the co-main event at Bellator 108 on November 15, 2013. He lost the bout and his title via TKO in the first round.

Volkov faced Mark Holata on March 7, 2014, at Bellator 111 in Heavyweight Tournament. He won the fight via TKO in the first round. Volkov faced Mighty Mo in the semifinals at Bellator 116 on April 11, 2014. He won the fight via spectacular knockout in the first round.

Volkov faced Blagoy Ivanov in the finals on May 17, 2014, at Bellator 120. He won the fight via submission in the second round.

Nearly a year since his last fight for the promotion, Volkov faced Tony Johnson at Bellator 136 on April 10, 2015. He lost the fight via split decision.

Volkov faced Cheick Kongo at Bellator 139 on June 26, 2015. He lost the fight via unanimous decision marking his second consecutive loss being cut by the Bellator MMA.

=== Ultimate Fighting Championship ===
In September 2016, it was announced that Volkov has signed with the Ultimate Fighting Championship. He made his debut against Timothy Johnson on November 19, 2016, at UFC Fight Night 99. Volkov was awarded a controversial split decision victory. 12 out of 12 media scores gave the bout to Johnson.

Volkov faced Roy Nelson on April 15, 2017, at UFC on Fox 24. He won the fight via unanimous decision.

Volkov faced Stefan Struve on September 2, 2017, at UFC Fight Night: Volkov vs. Struve. He won the bout via TKO in the third round. The win also earned Volkov his first Fight of the Night bonus award.

Volkov faced Fabrício Werdum on March 17, 2018, at UFC Fight Night 127. He won the back-and-forth fight via knockout in the fourth round. The win also earned Volkov his first Performance of the Night bonus award.

Volkov weighed in at UFC 226 on July 6, 2018, serving as the backup for the heavyweight title bout between Stipe Miocic and Daniel Cormier.

Volkov faced Derrick Lewis on October 6, 2018, at UFC 229. Volkov dominated the fight, hurting Lewis multiple times, but ultimately lost the fight via knockout late in round three.

Volkov was expected to face Alistair Overeem on April 20, 2019, at UFC Fight Night 149. However, on April 3, 2019, it was reported Volkov pulled out from the fight for undisclosed reason.

Volkov was scheduled to face Junior Dos Santos on November 9, 2019, at UFC on ESPN+ 21. However, dos Santos was forced to pull out from the event due to contracting a serious bacterial infection, and he was replaced by Greg Hardy. He won the fight via unanimous decision.

Volkov faced Curtis Blaydes on June 20, 2020, at UFC on ESPN: Blaydes vs. Volkov. Volkov lost the fight by unanimous decision.

Volkov faced Walt Harris on October 24, 2020 at UFC 254. He won the fight via technical knockout in round two.

Volkov faced Alistair Overeem on February 6, 2021, at UFC Fight Night 184. He won the fight via technical knockout in round two. This win earned him the Performance of the Night award.

Volkov faced Ciryl Gane on June 26, 2021, at UFC Fight Night 190. He lost the fight via unanimous decision.

Volkov faced Marcin Tybura on October 30, 2021, at UFC 267. He won the bout via unanimous decision.

Volkov faced Tom Aspinall on March 19, 2022, at UFC Fight Night 204. Volkov lost the fight via straight armbar submission in round one.

Volkov faced Jairzinho Rozenstruik on June 4, 2022, at UFC Fight Night 207. He won the fight via technical knockout in round one.

Volkov faced Alexander Romanov on March 11, 2023, at UFC Fight Night 221. He won the fight via technical knockout in the first round.

Volkov faced Tai Tuivasa on September 10, 2023, at UFC 293. He won the fight with Ezekiel Choke in the second round. With this win, Volkov became the second person in UFC history to finish a fight with an Ezekiel Choke.

Volkov faced Sergei Pavlovich on June 22, 2024, at UFC on ABC 6. He won the fight by unanimous decision.

Volkov was scheduled to face former interim UFC Heavyweight Champion Ciryl Gane in a rematch on October 26, 2024, at UFC 308. However, due to Volkov's knee injury, the bout was moved and took place on December 7, 2024, at UFC 310. Volkov lost the close fight by a controversial, split decision. 19 out of 20 media outlets scored the bout for Volkov. UFC CEO Dana White apologized to Volkov after the bout saying he thought Volkov had won the bout and the head of the commission explained to White what was thought to be the reasoning of the judges' scorecards. Volkov voiced his frustration about one of the judges, Adalaide Byrd, who has had a history of questionable scorecards in both MMA and boxing.

Volkov faced Jailton Almeida on October 25, 2025, at UFC 321. He won the fight by split decision.

Volkov faced Waldo Cortes-Acosta on May 9, 2026, at UFC 328. He won the fight by unanimous decision.

Volkov faced Rizvan Kuniev on October 24, 2026 at UFC 333. He won the fight by unanimous decision.

== Fighting style ==
Volkov is primarily a standup striker. He utilizes his big height, long reach, and powerful kicks to deliver accurate strikes from a distance. In particular, he is known for his patient and technical boxing as well as his punishing body kicks, which he utilized at UFC 254 in his knockout victory against Walt Harris.

== Championships and accomplishments ==
- Bellator Fighting Championships
  - Bellator Heavyweight World Championship (One time)
  - Bellator Season Ten Heavyweight Tournament Championship
  - Bellator Season Seven Heavyweight Tournament Championship
- M-1 Global
  - M-1 Global Heavyweight Championship (One time)
    - One successful title defence
  - M-1 Eastern European Tournament Runner-Up
- Ultimate Fighting Championship
  - Fight of the Night (One time) vs. Stefan Struve
  - Performance of the Night (Two times) vs. Fabrício Werdum and Alistair Overeem
  - Second most significant strikes landed in UFC Heavyweight division history (1324) (behind Andrei Arlovski)
    - Third most total strikes landed in UFC Heavyweight division history (1754)
  - Tied (Junior dos Santos & Curtis Blaydes) for fourth most wins in UFC Heavyweight division history (15)
  - Third most decision wins in UFC Heavyweight division history (7)
  - Fourth most total fight time in UFC Heavyweight division history (4:21:08)
  - Holds wins over two former UFC champions — Fabrício Werdum & Ricco Rodriguez
  - UFC Honors Awards
    - 2023: Fan's Choice Submission of the Year Nominee vs. Tai Tuivasa
- MMA Fighting
  - 2023 Third Team MMA All-Star

== Mixed martial arts record ==
Professional record breakdown
52 matches	41 wins	11 losses
By knockout	24	2
By submission	4	3
By decision	13	6

Res.	Record	Opponent	Method	Event	Date	Round	Time	Location	Notes
Win	41–11	Rizvan Kuniev	Decision (unanimous)	UFC 333	October 24, 2026	3	5:00	Abu Dhabi, United Arab Emirates	
Win	40–11	Waldo Cortes-Acosta	Decision (unanimous)	UFC 328	May 9, 2026	3	5:00	Newark, New Jersey, United States	
Win	39–11	Jailton Almeida	Decision (split)	UFC 321	October 25, 2025	3	5:00	Abu Dhabi, United Arab Emirates	
Loss	38–11	Ciryl Gane	Decision (split)	UFC 310	December 7, 2024	3	5:00	Las Vegas, Nevada, United States	
Win	38–10	Sergei Pavlovich	Decision (unanimous)	UFC on ABC: Whittaker vs. Aliskerov	June 22, 2024	3	5:00	Riyadh, Saudi Arabia	
Win	37–10	Tai Tuivasa	Submission (Ezekiel choke)	UFC 293	September 10, 2023	2	4:37	Sydney, Australia	
Win	36–10	Alexander Romanov	TKO (punches)	UFC Fight Night: Yan vs. Dvalishvili	March 11, 2023	1	2:16	Las Vegas, Nevada, United States	
Win	35–10	Jairzinho Rozenstruik	TKO (punches)	UFC Fight Night: Volkov vs. Rozenstruik	June 4, 2022	1	2:12	Las Vegas, Nevada, United States	
Loss	34–10	Tom Aspinall	Submission (straight armbar)	UFC Fight Night: Volkov vs. Aspinall	March 19, 2022	1	3:45	London, England	
Win	34–9	Marcin Tybura	Decision (unanimous)	UFC 267	October 30, 2021	3	5:00	Abu Dhabi, United Arab Emirates	
Loss	33–9	Ciryl Gane	Decision (unanimous)	UFC Fight Night: Gane vs. Volkov	June 26, 2021	5	5:00	Las Vegas, Nevada, United States	
Win	33–8	Alistair Overeem	TKO (punches)	UFC Fight Night: Overeem vs. Volkov	February 6, 2021	2	2:06	Las Vegas, Nevada, United States	Performance of the Night.
Win	32–8	Walt Harris	TKO (body kick and punches)	UFC 254	October 24, 2020	2	1:15	Abu Dhabi, United Arab Emirates	
Loss	31–8	Curtis Blaydes	Decision (unanimous)	UFC on ESPN: Blaydes vs. Volkov	June 20, 2020	5	5:00	Las Vegas, Nevada, United States	
Win	31–7	Greg Hardy	Decision (unanimous)	UFC Fight Night: Magomedsharipov vs. Kattar	November 9, 2019	3	5:00	Moscow, Russia	
Loss	30–7	Derrick Lewis	KO (punches)	UFC 229	October 6, 2018	3	4:49	Las Vegas, Nevada, United States	UFC heavyweight title eliminator.
Win	30–6	Fabrício Werdum	KO (punches)	UFC Fight Night: Werdum vs. Volkov	March 17, 2018	4	1:38	London, England	Performance of the Night.
Win	29–6	Stefan Struve	TKO (punches)	UFC Fight Night: Volkov vs. Struve	September 2, 2017	3	3:30	Rotterdam, Netherlands	Fight of the Night.
Win	28–6	Roy Nelson	Decision (unanimous)	UFC on Fox: Johnson vs. Reis	April 15, 2017	3	5:00	Kansas City, Missouri, United States	
Win	27–6	Timothy Johnson	Decision (split)	UFC Fight Night: Mousasi vs. Hall 2	November 19, 2016	3	5:00	Belfast, Northern Ireland	
Win	26–6	Attila Végh	KO (punches)	M-1 Challenge 68	June 16, 2016	1	2:38	Moscow, Russia	Defended the M-1 Global Heavyweight Championship.
Win	25–6	Denis Smoldarev	Submission (triangle choke)	M-1 Challenge 64	February 19, 2016	3	0:41	Moscow, Russia	Won the vacant M-1 Global Heavyweight Championship.
Loss	24–6	Cheick Kongo	Decision (unanimous)	Bellator 139	June 26, 2015	3	5:00	Mulvane, Kansas, United States	
Loss	24–5	Tony Johnson	Decision (split)	Bellator 136	April 10, 2015	3	5:00	Irvine, California, United States	
Win	24–4	Alexei Kudin	Decision (unanimous)	Union MMA Pro 2015	February 21, 2015	3	5:00	Krasnodar, Russia	
Win	23–4	Roy Boughton	TKO (punches)	Tech-KREP FC: Battle of Heroes	December 12, 2014	1	0:40	Saint Petersburg, Russia	
Win	22–4	Blagoy Ivanov	Submission (rear-naked choke)	Bellator 120	May 17, 2014	2	1:08	Southaven, Mississippi, United States	Bellator Season 10 Heavyweight Tournament Final.
Win	21–4	Mighty Mo	KO (head kick)	Bellator 116	April 11, 2014	1	2:44	Temecula, California, United States	Bellator Season 10 Heavyweight Tournament Semifinal.
Win	20–4	Mark Holata	TKO (punches)	Bellator 111	March 7, 2014	1	1:21	Thackerville, Oklahoma, United States	Bellator Season 10 Heavyweight Tournament Quarterfinal.
Loss	19–4	Vitaly Minakov	TKO (punches)	Bellator 108	November 15, 2013	1	2:57	Atlantic City, New Jersey, United States	Lost the Bellator Heavyweight World Championship.
Win	19–3	Rich Hale	Decision (unanimous)	Bellator 84	December 14, 2012	5	5:00	Hammond, Indiana, United States	Won the vacant Bellator Heavyweight World Championship; Bellator Season 7 Heavyweight Tournament Final.
Win	18–3	Vinicius Queiroz	TKO (punches)	Bellator 80	November 9, 2012	2	4:59	Hollywood, Florida, United States	Bellator Season 7 Heavyweight Tournament Semifinal.
Win	17–3	Brett Rogers	Decision (unanimous)	Bellator 75	October 5, 2012	3	5:00	Hammond, Indiana, United States	Bellator Season 7 Heavyweight Tournament Quarterfinal.
Win	16–3	Stefan Stankovic	TKO (punches)	MFP: Mayor Cup 2012	May 26, 2012	1	4:27	Khabarovsk, Russia	
Win	15–3	Ricco Rodriguez	Decision (unanimous)	BF: Baltic Challenge 3	February 23, 2012	3	5:00	Kaliningrad, Russia	
Win	14–3	Arsen Abdulkerimov	TKO (punches)	M-1 Global: Fedor vs. Monson	November 20, 2011	1	0:26	Moscow, Russia	
Win	13–3	Bahodir Ibrogimov	TKO (punches)	MMA Corona Cup 1	October 7, 2011	2	2:22	Moscow, Russia	
Win	12–3	Nedyalko Karadzhov	TKO (punches)	League S-70: Russia vs. Brazil	August 5, 2011	1	2:41	Sochi, Russia	
Win	11–3	Denis Goltsov	TKO (punches)	M-1 Challenge 25	April 28, 2011	2	3:05	Saint Petersburg, Russia	
Win	10–3	Ruslan Chapko	TKO (punches)	Voronezh Interregional 2011	January 15, 2011	1	N/A	Voronezh, Russia	
Loss	9–3	Pat Bennett	Decision (unanimous)	M-1 Challenge 22	December 10, 2010	4	5:00	Moscow, Russia	
Win	9–2	Evgeni Babich	TKO (punches)	LM: Tournament 3	September 18, 2010	1	2:10	Lipetsk, Russia	
Win	8–2	Eldar Yagudin	TKO (punches)	Ratnoe Pole: The First Battlefield	August 7, 2010	1	4:34	Ryazan, Russia	
Loss	7–2	Maxim Grishin	Submission (rear-naked choke)	M-1 Selection: 2010 Eastern Europe Finals	July 22, 2010	1	2:39	Moscow, Russia	Eastern Europe Tournament Final.
Win	7–1	Alexander Romaschenko	Submission (rear-naked choke)	M-1 Selection: 2010 Eastern Europe Round 3	May 28, 2010	1	2:59	Kyiv, Ukraine	Eastern Europe Tournament Semifinal.
Win	6–1	Vitalii Yalovenko	TKO (doctor stoppage)	M-1 Selection: 2010 Eastern Europe Round 2	April 10, 2010	2	1:05	Kyiv, Ukraine	Eastern Europe Tournament Opening Round.
Win	5–1	Ibragim Magomedov	Decision (unanimous)	M-1 Challenge 20: 2009 Finals	December 3, 2009	3	5:00	Saint Petersburg, Russia	Russian Team Championship Finals.
Win	4–1	Smbat Zakaryan	TKO (punches)	ProFC: Union Nation Cup 3	October 30, 2009	1	4:20	Rostov-on-Don, Russia	3rd Stage CIS Cup Team.
Win	3–1	Abdulhalik Magomedov	TKO (punches)	M-1 Challenge: 2009 Selections 8	October 4, 2009	1	4:43	Moscow, Russia	8th Stage Russian Team Championship.
Loss	2–1	Akhmed Sultanov	Submission (armbar)	M-1 Challenge: 2009 Selections 4	June 24, 2009	1	2:50	Saint Petersburg, Russia	4th Stage Russian Team Championship.
Win	2–0	Adam Alikhanov	TKO (punches)	M-1 Challenge: 2009 Selections 3	May 28, 2009	1	0:20	Saint Petersburg, Russia	3rd Stage Russian Team Championship.
Win	1–0	Nikolay Pleshakov	TKO (punches)	M-1 Challenge: 2009 Selections 2	April 19, 2009	1	1:20	Saint Petersburg, Russia	2nd Stage Russian Team Championship.

Awards and achievements
Vacant Title last held by Cole Konrad	2nd Bellator Heavyweight World Champion; December 14, 2012 – November 15, 2013	Succeeded by Vitaly Minakov
