= UFC Fight Night: Werdum vs. Volkov =

UFC mixed martial arts event in 2018

- The poster for UFC Fight Night: Werdum vs. Volkov
- Promotion: Ultimate Fighting Championship
- Date: March 17, 2018
- Venue: The O_{2} Arena
- City: London, England
- Attendance: 16,274
- Total gate: $2,028,000

Event chronology
| UFC 222: Cyborg vs. Kunitskaya | UFC Fight Night: Werdum vs. Volkov | UFC 223: Khabib vs. Iaquinta |

UFC Fight Night: Werdum vs. Volkov (also known as UFC Fight Night 127) was a mixed martial arts event produced by the Ultimate Fighting Championship that was held on March 17, 2018, at The O_{2} Arena in London, England.

== Background ==
A heavyweight bout between former UFC Heavyweight Champion Fabrício Werdum and former Bellator Heavyweight Champion Alexander Volkov headlined this event.

Promotional newcomer Dmitry Poberezhets was expected to face Mark Godbeer at this event. However, Poberezhets was forced to pull out from the card on January 25 due to injury and was replaced by fellow newcomer Dmitry Sosnovskiy.

Rustam Khabilov was expected to face Kajan Johnson at this event. However, Khabilov pulled out of the fight on February 8 citing injury and was replaced by Stevie Ray.

Elizeu Zaleski dos Santos was scheduled to face Jack Marshman at the event. However, Zaleski pulled out of the fight on February 19 citing a knee injury. He was replaced by Brad Scott. In turn, Marshman was removed from the card two days before the event due to medical issues surrounding his weight cut and the bout was scrapped.

On March 8, it was reported that Alex Reyes pulled out of his bout against Nasrat Haqparast due to injury. On March 12, Nad Narimani was announced as his replacement. The bout was scrapped minutes before the event as Haqparast was deemed unfit to fight by the medical team due to an infectious eye condition.

== Results ==
Main Card (UFC Fight Pass)
| Weight class | | | | Method | Round | Time | Notes |
|---|---|---|---|---|---|---|---|
| Heavyweight | Alexander Volkov | def. | Fabrício Werdum | KO (punches) | 4 | 1:38 |
| Light Heavyweight | Jan Błachowicz | def. | Jimi Manuwa | Decision (unanimous) (29–28, 29–28, 30–27) | 3 | 5:00 |
| Bantamweight | Tom Duquesnoy | def. | Terrion Ware | Decision (unanimous) (29–28, 29–28, 30–27) | 3 | 5:00 |
| Welterweight | Leon Edwards | def. | Peter Sobotta | TKO (punches) | 3 | 4:59 |
Preliminary Card (UFC Fight Pass)
| Middleweight | Charles Byrd | def. | John Phillips | Submission (rear-naked choke) | 1 | 3:58 |
| Welterweight | Danny Roberts | def. | Oliver Enkamp | KO (punch) | 1 | 2:12 |
| Featherweight | Danny Henry | def. | Hakeem Dawodu | Technical Submission (guillotine choke) | 1 | 0:39 |
| Light Heavyweight | Paul Craig | def. | Magomed Ankalaev | Submission (triangle choke) | 3 | 4:59 |
| Lightweight | Kajan Johnson | def. | Stevie Ray | Decision (split) (29–28, 28–29, 29–28) | 3 | 5:00 |
| Heavyweight | Dmitriy Sosnovskiy | def. | Mark Godbeer | Submission (rear-naked choke) | 2 | 4:29 |

== Bonus awards ==
The following fighters were awarded $50,000 bonuses:

- Fight of the Night: Jan Błachowicz vs. Jimi Manuwa
- Performance of the Night: Alexander Volkov and Paul Craig

== See also ==
- List of UFC events
- List of current UFC fighters
- 2018 in UFC
