= UFC 209 =

UFC mixed martial arts event in 2017

UFC 209: Woodley vs. Thompson 2
- The poster for UFC 209: Woodley vs. Thompson 2
- Promotion: Ultimate Fighting Championship
- Date: March 4, 2017
- Venue: T-Mobile Arena
- City: Paradise, Nevada
- Attendance: 13,150
- Total gate: $2,385,230

Event chronology
UFC Fight Night: Lewis vs. Browne	UFC 209: Woodley vs. Thompson 2	UFC Fight Night: Belfort vs. Gastelum

UFC 209: Woodley vs. Thompson 2 was a mixed martial arts event produced by the Ultimate Fighting Championship held on March 4, 2017, at the T-Mobile Arena in Paradise, Nevada, part of the Las Vegas metropolitan area.

== Background ==
The event was originally scheduled to take place on February 11 at Barclays Center in Brooklyn, New York. However, due to a lack of suitable headliners for the original UFC 208 (scheduled for Anaheim, California), that event was postponed to July 29 and an originally scheduled UFC 209 to be held in Brooklyn was renamed as the new UFC 208. Therefore, this event was also renamed from UFC 210 to UFC 209. This was the fourth UFC event held in the venue.

A number of fans, including longtime UFC commentator Joe Rogan, had expressed hope that UFC 209 would feature Nick and/or Nate Diaz on the card or be held in or near their hometown of Stockton, California. 209 is the telephone area code for Stockton: the brothers have long expressed pride in being from "the 209", and Nate Diaz had even once yelled "209! 209!" at Clay Guida during their fight as trash talk. Rogan even went so far as to say that a Diaz-based UFC 209 could break the company's pay-per-view buy record. Ultimately, the UFC could not come to financial terms with either Diaz brother, and the Stockton Arena was deemed too small for a major pay-per-view event.

A UFC Welterweight Championship rematch between current champion Tyron Woodley and five-time kickboxing world champion Stephen Thompson headlined this event. The pairing met recently at UFC 205, as Woodley retained his title after the fight ended in a majority draw.

An interim UFC Lightweight Championship bout between undefeated Khabib Nurmagomedov and The Ultimate Fighter: Team Lesnar vs. Team dos Santos welterweight winner Tony Ferguson was expected to take place at the co-main event. The pairing was originally booked for The Ultimate Fighter: Team McGregor vs. Team Faber Finale and later UFC on Fox: Teixeira vs. Evans. However, the bout was cancelled both times due to Nurmagomedov being injured and Ferguson pulling out due to a lung issue. Once again the bout suffered a cancellation, as Nurmagomedov had medical issues related to his weight cut and the doctors opted to pull him from the event on weigh-in day.

Igor Pokrajac was expected to face Ed Herman at the event. However, Pokrajac pulled out of the fight in early February citing an injury, and was replaced by Gadzhimurad Antigulov. Then, on February 20, Herman revealed that he was injured and also unable to compete at the event. In turn, promotion officials elected to remove Antigulov from the card and he will be rescheduled for a future event.

Todd Duffee was expected to face Mark Godbeer at the event. However, Duffee pulled out of the fight in mid-February for undisclosed reasons. He was replaced by promotional newcomer Daniel Spitz.

A heavyweight bout between Marcin Tybura and Luis Henrique, initially scheduled for UFC 208, was moved to this event. The pairing was initially delayed as Henrique was unable to gain medical clearance by the NYSAC after a recent corrective eye surgery.

== Results ==
Main Card
Weight class				Method	Round	Time	Notes
Welterweight	Tyron Woodley (c)	def.	Stephen Thompson	Decision (majority) (48–47, 47–47, 48–47)	5	5:00	(Note: For the UFC Welterweight Championship.)
Lightweight	David Teymur	def.	Lando Vannata	Decision (unanimous) (30–27, 30–27, 30–27)	3	5:00
Middleweight	Dan Kelly	def.	Rashad Evans	Decision (split) (29–28, 28–29, 29–28)	3	5:00
Women's Strawweight	Cynthia Calvillo	def.	Amanda Cooper	Submission (rear-naked choke)	1	3:19
Heavyweight	Alistair Overeem	def.	Mark Hunt	KO (knees)	3	1:44
Preliminary Card (Fox Sports 1)
Heavyweight	Marcin Tybura	def.	Luis Henrique	TKO (punches)	3	3:46
Featherweight	Darren Elkins	def.	Mirsad Bektić	KO (punches)	3	3:19
Bantamweight	Iuri Alcântara	def.	Luke Sanders	Submission (kneebar)	2	3:13	(Note: Sanders was deducted one point in round 1 due to an illegal knee to a downed opponent.)
Heavyweight	Mark Godbeer	def.	Daniel Spitz	Decision (unanimous) (30–27, 30–27, 30–27)	3	5:00
Preliminary Card (UFC Fight Pass)
Light Heavyweight	Tyson Pedro	def.	Paul Craig	TKO (elbows)	1	4:10
Bantamweight	Albert Morales	def.	Andre Soukhamthath	Decision (split) (29–28, 28–29, 29–28)	3	5:00

== Bonus awards ==
The following fighters were awarded $50,000 bonuses:

- Fight of the Night: David Teymur vs. Lando Vannata
- Performance of the Night: Darren Elkins and Iuri Alcântara

== Reported payout ==
The following is the reported payout to the fighters as reported to the Nevada State Athletic Commission. It does not include sponsor money and also does not include the UFC's traditional "fight night" bonuses. The total disclosed payout for the event was $3,057,000.

- Tyron Woodley: $500,000 (includes $100,000 win bonus) def. Stephen Thompson: $380,000
- David Teymur: $28,000 (includes $14,000 win bonus) def. Lando Vannata: $25,000
- Dan Kelly: $54,000 (includes $27,000 win bonus) def. Rashad Evans: $150,000
- Cynthia Calvillo: $20,000 (includes $10,000 win bonus) def. Amanda Cooper: $17,000
- Alistair Overeem: $750,000 (no win bonus) def. Mark Hunt: $750,000
- Marcin Tybura: $72,000 (includes $36,000 win bonus) def. Luis Henrique: $16,000
- Darren Elkins: $92,000 (includes $46,000 win bonus) def. Mirsad Bektić: $21,000
- Iuri Alcântara: $68,000 (includes $24,000 win bonus) def. Luke Sanders: $12,000
- Mark Godbeer: $24,000 (includes $12,000 win bonus) def. Daniel Spitz: $12,000
- Tyson Pedro: $24,000 (includes $12,000 win bonus) def. Paul Craig: $12,000
- Albert Morales: $20,000 (includes $10,000 win bonus) def. Andre Soukhamthath: $10,000

== See also ==
- 2017 in UFC
- List of UFC events
