= Luis Henrique (fighter) =

Brazilian mixed martial artist

- Born: Luis Henrique Barbosa de Oliveira; August 21, 1993 (age 33); Rio de Janeiro, Brazil
- Other names: KLB
- Height: 6 ft 2 in (188 cm)
- Weight: 253 lb (115 kg; 18 st 1 lb)
- Division: Heavyweight; Light Heavyweight
- Reach: 74 in (188 cm)
- Fighting out of: Rio de Janeiro, Brazil
- Team: Infight; Tatá Fight Team; Rizzo RVT; American Top Team
- Rank: Brown belt in Brazilian Jiu-Jitsu; Light blue belt in Muay Thai
- Wrestling: Brazilian National Team
- Years active: 2011–present

Mixed martial arts record
- Total: 30
- Wins: 19
- By knockout: 5
- By submission: 10
- By decision: 4
- Losses: 10
- By knockout: 3
- By decision: 7
- No contests: 1

Other information
- Mixed martial arts record from Sherdog

Luis Henrique (born August 21, 1993) is a Brazilian mixed martial artist currently competing in the heavyweight division. A professional since 2011, he has also fought in the UFC and KSW.

== Mixed martial arts career ==
=== Early career ===
Henrique began his professional MMA career in November 2011. He competed exclusively in his native Brazil for the first three-and-a-half years of his career and amassed a record of 8–1 with one No Contest over this time.

=== Ultimate Fighting Championship ===
Henrique made his promotional debut against fellow newcomer Francis Ngannou on December 19, 2015, at UFC on Fox 17. He lost the fight via knockout in the second round.

Henrique faced promotional newcomer Dmitry Smolyakov on July 23, 2016, at UFC on Fox 20. He won the fight via submission in the second round.

Henrique next faced Christian Colombo on November 19, 2016, at UFC Fight Night 100. He won the fight via submission in the third round.

Henrique faced Marcin Tybura on March 5, 2017, at UFC 209. He lost the fight via TKO in the third round.

Henrique faced promotional newcomer Arjan Bhullar on September 9, 2017, at UFC 215. He lost the fight via unanimous decision.

Henrique was expected to face Timothy Johnson at UFC Fight Night 125, but was removed from the fight card due to a bicep injury that needed surgery.

In June 2018 it was announced that Henrique would face Mark Godbeer in a light heavyweight bout on September 22, 2018, at UFC Fight Night 137. However, Godbeer pulled out of the fight in early August citing injury and was replaced by promotional newcomer Ryan Spann. He lost the fight via a unanimous decision.

It was reported on November 24, 2018, that Henrique was released by the UFC.

=== Post-UFC career ===
After the release from the UFC Henrique one submission victory in his old promotion Watch Out Combat Show before signing with the KSW. Henrique made his promotional debut against Michał Andryszak at KSW 49: Soldić vs. Kaszubowski on May 18, 2018. He won the fight via first-round submission.

Henrique made his sophomore appearance in the KSW as he replaced Damian Grabowski who withdrew from a title bout against Philip De Fries at KSW 50: London on September 14, 2019, due to a hand injury. Henrique lost the fight split decision.

After the failed title shot, Henrique was expected to face Teodoras Aukštuolis at ARES FC 2 on April 3, 2020. However, due to the COVID-19 pandemic, the event was postponed until October 30, 2020.

Henrique faced Aleksandr Maslov in the main event of Open Fighting Championship 3 on April 17, 2021. He lost a close bout via split decision.

Henrique faced Kirill Kornilov on May 6, 2022, at RCC 11. He lost the bout via unanimous decision.

Henrique faced Slim Trabelsi on June 25, 2022, at Ares FC 7. He lost the bout via unanimous decision.

After three win at Brazil regional promotion, Henrique faced Justin Sumter on March 22, 2025, at LFA 204. He won the fight via a kimura in round two.

=== Oktagon MMA ===
In his promotional debut, Henrique faced Lazar Todev on September 13, 2025, at Oktagon 75. He lost the fight via unanimous decision.

== Mixed martial arts record ==
Professional record breakdown
30 matches	19 wins	10 losses
By knockout	5	3
By submission	10	0
By decision	4	7
No contests	1	

Res.	Record	Opponent	Method	Event	Date	Round	Time	Location	Notes
Win	19–10 (1)	Rodolfo dos Santos	Submission (neck crank)	Jungle Fight 155	October 3, 2026	1	4:41	Niterói, Brazil	Won the vacant Jungle Fight Light Heavyweight Championship.
Win	18–10 (1)	Reginaldo Rodrigues dos Santos	TKO (punches)	Watch Out Combat Show 64	August 22, 2026	1	0:43	Rio de Janeiro, Brazil	
Loss	17–10 (1)	Lazar Todev	Decision (unanimous)	Oktagon 75	September 13, 2025	3	5:00	Hanover, Germany	Heavyweight bout.
Win	17–9 (1)	Justin Sumter	Submission (kimura)	LFA 204	March 22, 2025	2	4:45	Mashantucket, Connecticut, United States	Return to Light Heavyweight.
Win	16–9 (1)	Luis Andrade de Oliveira	Submission (arm-triangle choke)	The Conqueror Fight 2	December 23, 2023	1	2:44	Angra dos Reis, Brazil	
Win	15–9 (1)	Alison Vicente	Decision (unanimous)	Federação Fight 16	September 2, 2023	3	5:00	Lagoa Santa, Brazil	
Win	14–9 (1)	Davi Lucas da Silva	TKO (punches)	The Lion Fight Series 2	June 17, 2023	1	0:50	Rio de Janeiro, Brazil	
Loss	13–9 (1)	Slim Trabelsi	Decision (unanimous)	Ares FC 7	June 25, 2022	3	5:00	Paris, France	
Loss	13–8 (1)	Kirill Kornilov	Decision (unanimous)	RCC 11	May 6, 2022	3	5:00	Yekaterinburg, Russia	
Loss	13–7 (1)	Aleksandr Maslov	Decision (split)	Open FC 3	April 17, 2021	5	5:00	Saint Petersburg, Russia	
Win	13–6 (1)	João Paulo dos Santos	Submission (guillotine choke)	Watch Out Combat Show 55	October 17, 2020	1	1:02	Rio de Janeiro, Brazil	
Loss	12–6 (1)	Phil De Fries	Decision (split)	KSW 50	September 14, 2019	5	5:00	London, England	For the KSW Heavyweight Championship.
Win	12–5 (1)	Michał Andryszak	Technical Submission (guillotine choke)	KSW 49	May 18, 2019	1	1:59	Gdańsk, Poland	
Win	11–5 (1)	Rodolfo Oliveira	Submission (guillotine choke)	Watch Out Combat Show 53	November 24, 2018	1	1:59	Rio de Janeiro, Brazil	Catchweight (220 lb) bout.
Loss	10–5 (1)	Ryan Spann	Decision (unanimous)	UFC Fight Night: Santos vs. Anders	September 22, 2018	3	5:00	São Paulo, Brazil	Light Heavyweight bout.
Loss	10–4 (1)	Arjan Bhullar	Decision (unanimous)	UFC 215	September 9, 2017	3	5:00	Edmonton, Alberta, Canada	
Loss	10–3 (1)	Marcin Tybura	TKO (punches)	UFC 209	March 4, 2017	3	3:46	Las Vegas, Nevada, United States	
Win	10–2 (1)	Christian Colombo	Submission (guillotine choke)	UFC Fight Night: Bader vs. Nogueira 2	November 19, 2016	3	2:12	São Paulo, Brazil	
Win	9–2 (1)	Dmitry Smolyakov	Submission (rear-naked choke)	UFC on Fox: Holm vs. Shevchenko	July 23, 2016	2	3:58	Chicago, Illinois, United States	
Loss	8–2 (1)	Francis Ngannou	KO (punch)	UFC on Fox: dos Anjos vs. Cowboy 2	December 19, 2015	2	2:53	Orlando, Florida, United States	Return to Heavyweight.
Win	8–1 (1)	Heitor Eschiavo	Submission (americana)	Watch Out Combat Show 41	July 18, 2015	2	1:35	Rio de Janeiro, Brazil	
Win	7–1 (1)	Armando Sixel	Decision (unanimous)	Watch Out Combat Show 40	December 13, 2014	3	5:00	Rio de Janeiro, Brazil	
Win	6–1 (1)	João Paulo Santos	Submission (rear-naked choke)	Watch Out Combat Show 38	October 18, 2014	1	1:46	Ubá, Brazil	
Win	5–1 (1)	Danilo Souza	Decision (unanimous)	Watch Out Combat Show 35	June 14, 2014	3	3:00	Rio de Janeiro, Brazil	
Win	4–1 (1)	Ney Duarte	TKO (punches)	Watch Out Combat Show 22	November 9, 2012	2	N/A	Rio de Janeiro, Brazil	
Win	3–1 (1)	Túlio Marcos	TKO (punches)	Brasil Fight 6	September 21, 2012	1	1:16	Rio de Janeiro, Brazil	Return to Light Heavyweight.
NC	2–1 (1)	Jollyson Francino	NC (illegal headbutt)	Shooto Brazil 32	July 14, 2012	2	4:19	Rio de Janeiro, Brazil	Heavyweight debut. Accidental illegal headbutt led to Francino being knocked unconscious.
Loss	2–1	Sultan Aliev	TKO (punches)	Revolution FC 1	March 9, 2012	2	2:30	Beirut, Lebanon	
Win	2–0	Luis Mauricio	TKO (punches)	Showtime Fights 2	December 3, 2011	1	4:29	Rio de Janeiro, Brazil	
Win	1–0	Jorge Evangelista	Decision (unanimous)	Watch Out Combat Show 16	November 5, 2011	3	5:00	Rio de Janeiro, Brazil	Light Heavyweight debut.

== Muay Thai record ==
Muay Thai Record
1 Wins, 0 Losses, 0 Draw
Date	Result	Opponent	Event	Location	Method	Round	Time
2024-12-22	Win	(Thailand) Hwang	Island Fighters League 3	Phuket, Thailand	KO (knee)	2	0:24
Legend: Win Loss Draw/No contest Notes

== See also ==
- List of male mixed martial artists
