= Marcin Tybura =

Polish mixed martial arts fighter

- Born: November 9, 1985 (age 40); Uniejow, Poland
- Nickname: Tybur
- Height: 6 ft 3 in (191 cm)
- Weight: 251 lb (114 kg; 17 st 13 lb)
- Division: Heavyweight
- Reach: 78 in (198 cm)
- Fighting out of: Uniejow, Poland
- Team: Jackson-Wink MMA (formerly); Syndicate MMA (2019–present); Ankos MMA (2020–present)
- Rank: Black belt in Brazilian Jiu-Jitsu under Kamil Umiński and Radek Turk
- Years active: 2011–present

Mixed martial arts record
- Total: 39
- Wins: 27
- By knockout: 10
- By submission: 7
- By decision: 10
- Losses: 12
- By knockout: 6
- By submission: 1
- By decision: 5

Other information
- University: University of Łódź
- Mixed martial arts record from Sherdog
- Last updated on: March 16, 2017

Marcin Tybura (born November 9, 1985) is a Polish professional mixed martial artist. He currently competes in the Heavyweight division of the Ultimate Fighting Championship (UFC). A professional competitor since 2011, Tybura previously fought for M-1 and was an M-1 Global Heavyweight Champion and M-1 Grand Prix 2013 Heavyweight Champion.

== Early life ==
Tybura began training in 2006 after a friend introduced him to the sport. Within weeks, he began feeling the urge to compete. However, he would not make his professional debut until several years later.

He earned a Master's degree in Physical Education at the University of Łódź.

== Mixed martial arts career ==
=== Early career ===
Tybura made his professional debut on November 5, 2011, against Robert Marcok, whom he beat by a rear-naked choke. He won his next five fights on the Polish MMA circuit, most notably defeating the future UFC heavyweight Adam Wieczorek by a unanimous decision. His last fight at the regional level was a third-round TKO of Krystian Kopytowski at Gladiator Arena 4.

=== M-1 Global ===
In 2013, Tybura signed with the Russian based M-1 Global promotion. For his promotional debut, Tybura was scheduled to fight Denis Komkin as a Heavyweight Grand Prix alternate bout. He won the fight by TKO, after Komkin retired from the bout at the end of the first round.

Tybura was then scheduled to fight Chaban Ka at M-1 Challenge 41, in a Heavyweight Grand Prix Semifinal. He beat Ka by a first-round TKO.

In his next two fights, Tybura beat Konstantin Gluhov at M-1 Challenge 42 by rear-naked choke and Maro Perak at M-1 Challenge 47 by a third-round TKO.

At M-1 Challenge 50, Tybura fought Damian Grabowski in the M-1 Heavyweight Grand Prix finals. Tybura submitted Grabowski with a north-south choke 88 seconds into the first round, to become the M-1 Heavyweight champion. He was scheduled to make his first title defense against Denis Smoldarev at M-1 Challenge 53. Tybura successfully defended the title with a first-round submission.

After successfully defending his title, Tybura was scheduled to fight the M-1 Light-heavyweight titleholder Stephan Puetz in a super-fight. The super-fight was contested at heavyweight, with neither of the belts being on the line. Tybura came into the fight with a 10 kilogram weight advantage. Despite winning the first two rounds on the judges' scorecards, Tybura suffered a cut in the third round, which forced the ringside doctor to stop the bout. Tybura suffered the first loss of his professional career, as Puetz was awarded the TKO win.

In his last fight with M-1, Tybura was scheduled to defend his title for the second time against the Croatian heavyweight Ante Delija. The fight ended two minutes into the first round, as Delija suffered a leg break, due to a checked leg kick.

=== Ultimate Fighting Championship ===
Tybura signed with the UFC in January 2016.

Tybura made his promotional debut April 10, 2016, against Timothy Johnson at UFC Fight Night 86. He lost the fight via unanimous decision.

Tybura next faced Viktor Pešta on August 6, 2016, at UFC Fight Night 92. He won the fight via KO (head kick), earning a Performance of the Night bonus in the process.

Tybura next fought at UFC 209 on March 4, 2017. He faced Luis Henrique and won the fight via TKO in the third round.

Tybura faced Andrei Arlovski on June 17, 2017, at UFC Fight Night 111. He won the fight by unanimous decision (29–28, 28–27, and 29–27).

Tybura was supposed to face Mark Hunt on November 19, 2017, at UFC Fight Night 121. On October 11, 2017, Hunt was pulled from the fight by UFC officials citing "medical concerns" on recent Hunt's first person interview statement, and Hunt was replaced by Fabrício Werdum. He lost the fight via unanimous decision.

Tybura faced Derrick Lewis on February 18, 2018, at UFC Fight Night 126. He lost the fight via technical knockout.

Tybura faced Stefan Struve on July 22, 2018, at UFC Fight Night 134. He won the fight via unanimous decision.

Tybura faced Shamil Abdurakhimov on April 20, 2019, at UFC Fight Night 149. He lost the fight via TKO in the second round.

Tybura faced Augusto Sakai on September 14, 2019, at UFC Fight Night 158. He lost the fight via knockout in the first round.

Tybura faced Serghei Spivac on February 29, 2020, at UFC Fight Night 169. He won the fight via unanimous decision.

Tybura was expected to face Alexander Romanov on July 11, 2020, at UFC 251. However, Romanov was pulled from the event due to contracting the COVID-19 virus and was replaced by promotional newcomer Maxim Grishin. Tybura won the fight via unanimous decision.

Tybura faced Ben Rothwell on October 11, 2020 at UFC Fight Night 179. He won the fight via unanimous decision.

Tybura faced Greg Hardy on December 19, 2020, at UFC Fight Night 183. He won the fight in the second round via a technical knockout. This win earned him the Performance of the Night award.

Tybura was scheduled to face Blagoy Ivanov on March 27, 2021, at UFC 260. However, Ivanov was pulled from the bout due to injury. Tybura was then scheduled to face Walt Harris on June 5, 2021, at UFC Fight Night: Rozenstruik vs. Sakai. After surviving an early onslaught from Harris, Tybura took Harris down and finished him with ground and pound. This win earned him the Performance of the Night award.

Tybura faced Alexander Volkov on October 30, 2021, at UFC 267. He lost the bout via unanimous decision.

Tybura was scheduled to face Jairzinho Rozenstruik on February 26, 2022, at UFC Fight Night 202. However, in mid January it was announced the bout was moved to UFC 273 on April 9, 2022. However, the bout was pulled from the card after Tybura withdrew due to an undisclosed illness.

Tybura faced Alexander Romanov on August 20, 2022, at UFC 278. Tybura won the fight via a controversial majority decision. 17 out of 18 media outlets scored the bout a draw.

Tybura faced Blagoy Ivanov on February 4, 2023, at UFC Fight Night 218. He won the fight via unanimous decision.

Tybura faced Tom Aspinall on July 22, 2023, at UFC Fight Night 224. He lost the fight via TKO just over a minute into the first round.

Tybura was scheduled to face Tai Tuivasa on February 17, 2024, at UFC 298, but the bout was later moved to instead take place at UFC Fight Night 239, on March 16, 2024. Tybura won the bout by a rear-naked choke submission in the first round. This fight earned him another Performance of the Night award.

Tybura faced Serghei Spivac in a rematch on August 10, 2024 at UFC on ESPN 61. He lost the fight via an armbar submission in the first round, leading to his first submission loss in his career.

Tybura faced Jhonata Diniz on November 16, 2024 at UFC 309. He won the fight by technical knockout via doctor stoppage at the end of the second round as a result of ground elbows.

Tybura faced Mick Parkin on March 22, 2025 at UFC Fight Night 255. He won the fight by unanimous decision.

Tybura faced 2022 PFL Heavyweight Champion Ante Delija in a rematch on September 6, 2025 at UFC Fight Night 258. He lost the fight by knockout in the first round.

Tybura was scheduled to face Valter Walker on March 28, 2026 at UFC Fight Night 271. However, Walker withdrew due to a foot fracture and was replaced by promotional newcomer Tyrell Fortune. Tybura lost the fight by unanimous decision.

Tybura faced Aleksandar Rakić on August 1, 2026 at UFC Fight Night 283. He lost the fight by unanimous decision.

== Championships and achievements ==
=== Mixed martial arts ===
- Ultimate Fighting Championship
  - Performance of the Night (Four times) vs. Viktor Pešta, Greg Hardy, Walt Harris and Tai Tuivasa
  - Second most decision wins in UFC Heavyweight division history (8) (behind Andrei Arlovski)
  - Third most total fight time in UFC Heavyweight division history (4:09:26)
  - Second most control time in UFC Heavyweight division history (1:15:30) (behind Curtis Blaydes)
  - Second most top position time in UFC Heavyweight division history (56:38) (behind Curtis Blaydes)
  - Second most total strikes landed in UFC Heavyweight division history (1816) (behind Andrei Arlovski)
  - Fourth most bouts in UFC Heavyweight division history (25)
  - Third longest fight time in UFC Heavyweight division history (4:39:26)
  - UFC.com Awards
    - 2022: Ranked #10 Upset of the Year vs. Alexander Romanov
- M-1 Global
  - M-1 2013 Grand Prix Champion (heavyweight)
  - M-1 Global Heavyweight Champion
- MMA Fighting
  - 2024 Second Team MMA All-Star

== Mixed martial arts record ==
Professional record breakdown
| 39 matches | 27 wins | 12 losses |
| By knockout | 10 | 6 |
| By submission | 7 | 1 |
| By decision | 10 | 5 |

| Res. | Record | Opponent | Method | Event | Date | Round | Time | Location | Notes |
|---|---|---|---|---|---|---|---|---|---|
| Loss | 27–12 | Aleksandar Rakić | Decision (unanimous) | UFC Fight Night: Medić vs. Rodriguez | August 1, 2026 | 3 | 5:00 | Belgrade, Serbia | |
| Loss | 27–11 | Tyrell Fortune | Decision (unanimous) | UFC Fight Night: Adesanya vs. Pyfer | March 28, 2026 | 3 | 5:00 | Seattle, Washington, United States | |
| Loss | 27–10 | Ante Delija | KO (punches) | UFC Fight Night: Imavov vs. Borralho | September 6, 2025 | 1 | 2:03 | Paris, France | |
| Win | 27–9 | Mick Parkin | Decision (unanimous) | UFC Fight Night: Edwards vs. Brady | March 22, 2025 | 3 | 5:00 | London, England | |
| Win | 26–9 | Jhonata Diniz | TKO (doctor stoppage) | UFC 309 | November 16, 2024 | 2 | 5:00 | New York City, New York, United States | |
| Loss | 25–9 | Serghei Spivac | Submission (armbar) | UFC on ESPN: Tybura vs. Spivac 2 | August 10, 2024 | 1 | 1:44 | Las Vegas, Nevada, United States | |
| Win | 25–8 | Tai Tuivasa | Technical Submission (rear-naked choke) | UFC Fight Night: Tuivasa vs. Tybura | March 16, 2024 | 1 | 4:08 | Las Vegas, Nevada, United States | Performance of the Night. |
| Loss | 24–8 | Tom Aspinall | TKO (elbow and punches) | UFC Fight Night: Aspinall vs. Tybura | July 22, 2023 | 1 | 1:13 | London, England | |
| Win | 24–7 | Blagoy Ivanov | Decision (unanimous) | UFC Fight Night: Lewis vs. Spivac | February 4, 2023 | 3 | 5:00 | Las Vegas, Nevada, United States | |
| Win | 23–7 | Alexander Romanov | Decision (majority) | UFC 278 | August 20, 2022 | 3 | 5:00 | Salt Lake City, Utah, United States | |
| Loss | 22–7 | Alexander Volkov | Decision (unanimous) | UFC 267 | October 30, 2021 | 3 | 5:00 | Abu Dhabi, United Arab Emirates | |
| Win | 22–6 | Walt Harris | TKO (punches) | UFC Fight Night: Rozenstruik vs. Sakai | June 5, 2021 | 1 | 4:06 | Las Vegas, Nevada, United States | Performance of the Night. |
| Win | 21–6 | Greg Hardy | TKO (punches) | UFC Fight Night: Thompson vs. Neal | December 19, 2020 | 2 | 4:31 | Las Vegas, Nevada, United States | Performance of the Night. |
| Win | 20–6 | Ben Rothwell | Decision (unanimous) | UFC Fight Night: Moraes vs. Sandhagen | October 11, 2020 | 3 | 5:00 | Abu Dhabi, United Arab Emirates | |
| Win | 19–6 | Maxim Grishin | Decision (unanimous) | UFC 251 | July 12, 2020 | 3 | 5:00 | Abu Dhabi, United Arab Emirates | |
| Win | 18–6 | Serghei Spivac | Decision (unanimous) | UFC Fight Night: Benavidez vs. Figueiredo | February 29, 2020 | 3 | 5:00 | Norfolk, Virginia, United States | |
| Loss | 17–6 | Augusto Sakai | KO (punches) | UFC Fight Night: Cowboy vs. Gaethje | September 14, 2019 | 1 | 0:59 | Vancouver, British Columbia, Canada | |
| Loss | 17–5 | Shamil Abdurakhimov | TKO (punches) | UFC Fight Night: Overeem vs. Oleinik | April 20, 2019 | 2 | 3:15 | Saint Petersburg, Russia | |
| Win | 17–4 | Stefan Struve | Decision (unanimous) | UFC Fight Night: Shogun vs. Smith | July 22, 2018 | 3 | 5:00 | Hamburg, Germany | |
| Loss | 16–4 | Derrick Lewis | KO (punches) | UFC Fight Night: Cowboy vs. Medeiros | February 18, 2018 | 3 | 2:48 | Austin, Texas, United States | |
| Loss | 16–3 | Fabrício Werdum | Decision (unanimous) | UFC Fight Night: Werdum vs. Tybura | November 19, 2017 | 5 | 5:00 | Sydney, Australia | |
| Win | 16–2 | Andrei Arlovski | Decision (unanimous) | UFC Fight Night: Holm vs. Correia | June 17, 2017 | 3 | 5:00 | Kallang, Singapore | |
| Win | 15–2 | Luis Henrique | TKO (punches) | UFC 209 | March 4, 2017 | 3 | 3:46 | Las Vegas, Nevada, United States | |
| Win | 14–2 | Viktor Pešta | KO (head kick) | UFC Fight Night: Rodríguez vs. Caceres | August 6, 2016 | 2 | 0:53 | Salt Lake City, Utah, United States | Performance of the Night. |
| Loss | 13–2 | Timothy Johnson | Decision (unanimous) | UFC Fight Night: Rothwell vs. dos Santos | April 10, 2016 | 3 | 5:00 | Zagreb, Croatia | |
| Win | 13–1 | Ante Delija | TKO (leg injury) | M-1 Challenge 61 | September 20, 2015 | 1 | 2:21 | Nazran, Russia | Defended the M-1 Global Heavyweight Championship. |
| Loss | 12–1 | Stephan Puetz | TKO (doctor stoppage) | M-1 Challenge 57 | May 2, 2015 | 3 | 3:48 | Orenburg, Russia | Non-title bout. |
| Win | 12–0 | Denis Smoldarev | Submission (rear-naked choke) | M-1 Challenge 53 | November 25, 2014 | 1 | 3:35 | Beijing, China | Defended the M-1 Global Heavyweight Championship. |
| Win | 11–0 | Damian Grabowski | Technical Submission (north-south choke) | M-1 Challenge 50 | August 15, 2014 | 1 | 1:28 | Saint Petersburg, Russia | Won the M-1 Global Heavyweight Championship. Submission of the Night. |
| Win | 10–0 | Maro Perak | TKO (punches) | M-1 Challenge 47 | April 4, 2014 | 3 | 3:26 | Orenburg, Russia | |
| Win | 9–0 | Konstantin Gluhov | Submission (rear-naked choke) | M-1 Challenge 42 | October 20, 2013 | 1 | 4:30 | Saint Petersburg, Russia | Won the 2013 M-1 Heavyweight Grand Prix. |
| Win | 8–0 | Chaban Ka | TKO (punches) | M-1 Challenge 41 | August 21, 2013 | 1 | 2:05 | Saint Petersburg, Russia | 2013 M-1 Heavyweight Grand Prix Semifinal. |
| Win | 7–0 | Denis Komkin | TKO (retirement) | M-1 Challenge 37 | February 27, 2013 | 1 | 5:00 | Orenburg, Russia | 2013 M-1 Heavyweight Grand Prix Alternate bout. |
| Win | 6–0 | Krystian Kopytowski | TKO (retirement) | Gladiator Arena 4 | December 8, 2012 | 3 | 1:53 | Pyrzyce, Poland | |
| Win | 5–0 | Szymon Bajor | Decision (split) | Prime FC 1 | June 1, 2012 | 3 | 5:00 | Mielec, Poland | |
| Win | 4–0 | Andrzej Kosecki | Submission (rear-naked choke) | Olimp Extreme Fight: Carphatian Primus Belt Round 2 | February 24, 2012 | 1 | 3:17 | Rzeszów, Poland | |
| Win | 3–0 | Stanisław Ślusakowicz | Submission (triangle armbar) | Olimp Extreme Fight: Carphatian Primus Belt Round 1 | November 13, 2011 | 1 | 3:20 | Rzeszów, Poland | |
| Win | 2–0 | Adam Wieczorek | Decision (unanimous) | Polish MMA Championships Finals | November 5, 2011 | 2 | 5:00 | Chorzów, Poland | |
| Win | 1–0 | Robert Marcok | Submission (rear-naked choke) | Polish MMA Championships Finals | November 5, 2011 | 1 | 3:48 | Chorzów, Poland | Heavyweight debut. |

== See also ==
- List of current UFC fighters
- List of male mixed martial artists
