= Fabrício Werdum =

Brazilian mixed martial artist and Jiu-Jitsu practitioner

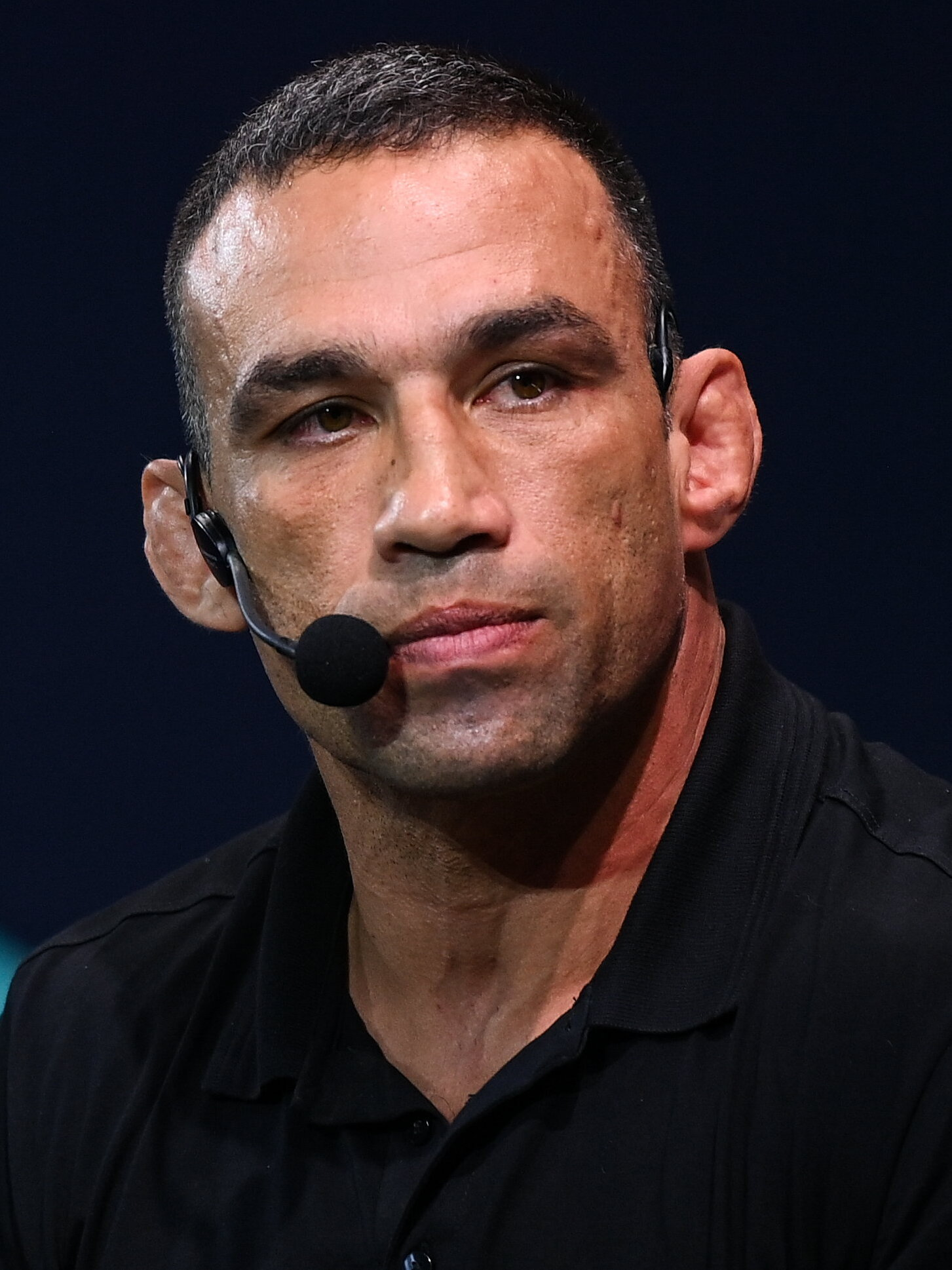
- Werdum in 2023
- Born: 30 July 1977 (age 49); Porto Alegre, Rio Grande do Sul, Brazil
- Other names: Vai Cavalo (Go Horse)
- Height: 6 ft 4 in (193 cm)
- Weight: 246 lb (112 kg; 17 st 8 lb)
- Division: Heavyweight
- Reach: 77 in (196 cm)
- Style: Brazilian Jiu-Jitsu
- Fighting out of: Los Angeles, California, U.S.
- Team: Kings MMA; Werdum Combat Team; Akhmat Fight Club
- Rank: 2nd degree black belt in Brazilian Jiu-Jitsu under Octávio "Ratinho" Couto; Black belt in Judo; Black prajied in Muay Thai under Rafael Cordeiro
- Years active: 2002–present (MMA)

Mixed martial arts record
- Total: 35
- Wins: 24
- By knockout: 6
- By submission: 12
- By decision: 6
- Losses: 9
- By knockout: 3
- By decision: 6
- Draws: 1
- No contests: 1

Other information
- Mixed martial arts record from Sherdog

Fabrício Werdum (Portuguese pronunciation: [faˈbɾisju veʁˈdũ]; born 30 July 1977) is a Brazilian mixed martial artist and former UFC Heavyweight Champion who competes in the Heavyweight division. He is also a 4-time Brazilian jiu-jitsu world champion, a two-time Abu Dhabi Combat Club World Heavyweight Champion and a member of the ADCC Hall of Fame. He holds black belts in Brazilian jiu-jitsu, Judo, and Muay Thai. Werdum has competed in PRIDE, the UFC, Strikeforce, and Jungle Fight. Fight Matrix ranks him as the fifth best heavyweight MMA fighter of all time.

== Early life and education ==
Born in Porto Alegre, Werdum started training in Brazilian jiu-jitsu after being choked unconscious with a triangle choke by the ex-boyfriend of his girlfriend. He trained with Marcio Corleta at the Porto Alegre Academy, Winner Behring. After success in competitive Brazilian jiu-jitsu and submission grappling, he started his career in MMA. He moved to Spain to join his mother, who had been living in Madrid. As a purple belt, he started teaching the art of Brazilian jiu-jitsu in Madrid and other cities of Spain. Despite only training with white and blue belts, he became a BJJ World Champion, being promoted to the rank of black belt by Master Sylvio Behring three years later.

From 2003 to 2011, Werdum's incomplete submission grappling record was 32 wins and 13 losses across 9 international tournaments. Competing at 99+ kg, he won first place at the ADCC World Championships in 2007 and 2009, second place at the ADCC World Championships in 2011, first place at the World IBJJF Jiu-Jitsu Championships in 2003 and 2004, second place at the Pan American Jiu-Jitsu Championships in 2003, and second place at the CBJJO World Jiu-Jitsu Cup in 2003.

== Mixed martial arts career ==
Werdum's early fights were with the promotions Jungle Fight, Millennium Brawl, and World Absolute Fight. He boasted a 4–0–1 record, including a win against BJJ specialist Gabriel Gonzaga. He was Mirko Filipović’s sparring partner at that time and the Croat was the main reason for his debut in PRIDE.

=== PRIDE Fighting Championships ===
In 2005, Werdum made his PRIDE debut against Tom Erikson, winning by submission. Later that year he faced Roman Zentsov in PRIDE Final Conflict 2005, he was able to defeat Zentsov by a triangle choke in 6:01 of the first round. Werdum then had the first loss in his MMA career, when he lost to Sergei Kharitonov via split decision in PRIDE 30. Then in early 2006, Werdum defeated Jon Olav Einemo by unanimous decision in PRIDE 31.

He accumulated a record of 3–1 in PRIDE before entering the 2006 Pride Open Weight Grand Prix. His first match of the tournament was against Dutch fighter Alistair Overeem, and he won via kimura in the second round. He then faced former PRIDE Heavyweight Champion, Antônio Rodrigo Nogueira in the quarter-finals, losing via decision.

Werdum then had a short stint in 2 Hot 2 Handle, facing Alexander Emelianenko in a Heavyweight bout, and beating the Russian by submission via triangle choke armbar combination.

=== Ultimate Fighting Championship ===
Fabrício Werdum debuted in the UFC on 21 April 2007 at UFC 70: Nations Collide. He faced former UFC Heavyweight Champion Andrei Arlovski, losing via unanimous decision. He began to train in Brazil at Chute Boxe Academy, becoming more aggressive and showing improvement in his striking, particularly in Muay Thai attacks.

At UFC 80 on 19 January 2008, Werdum met Gabriel Gonzaga in a rematch. Werdum won the bout by TKO. He weathered an early striking onslaught only to secure the Muay Thai clinch and connect with several knee strikes before taking Gonzaga to the ground and finishing him with punches.

Werdum's next fight was against Brandon Vera at UFC 85. He defeated Vera by TKO in the 1st round. Werdum achieved full mount with less than 30 seconds to go in the round and connected with a number of unanswered punches. The decision to stop the bout was booed due to the small amount of time remaining in the round, although the official time of stoppage was 4:40.

In his next fight at UFC 90, Werdum was heavily favored to win but was knocked out in 1:20 of the first round via uppercut by debuting Junior dos Santos. After the loss Werdum's contract was terminated by the UFC. Since Werdum was not contacted directly about the termination he had no idea he had been cut and initially denied the news of him no longer being in the UFC as just a rumor.

=== Strikeforce ===
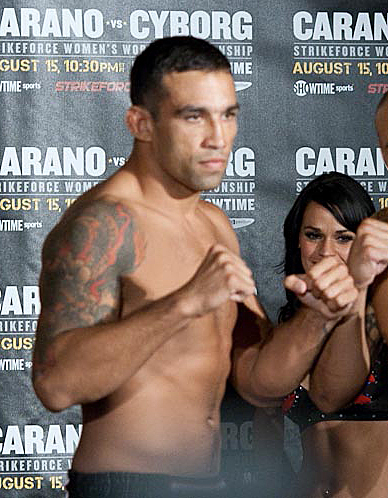
Werdum in 2009

After leaving the UFC Werdum then signed with Strikeforce. He made his debut at Strikeforce: Carano vs. Cyborg on 15 August 2009, against fellow UFC veteran Mike "MAK" Kyle. He won by submission in 1:24 of the first round. Werdum followed that up with a unanimous decision victory over Antônio "Bigfoot" Silva at Strikeforce: Fedor vs. Rogers.

Werdum faced former Pride Heavyweight Champion Fedor Emelianenko on 26 June 2010, at Strikeforce: Fedor vs. Werdum. In an enormous upset victory, Werdum forced Fedor to tap via triangle/armbar 1:09 into the first round. The victory ended Emelianenko's 28-fight unbeaten streak while propelling Werdum's status up the Heavyweight rankings. He was ranked as the third-best Heavyweight in MMA by Sherdog. The victory over Fedor also gave him the distinction of being the only man to hold victories over both of the Emelianenko brothers.

A rematch with Alistair Overeem took place on 18 June 2011, at Strikeforce: Dallas as part of an eight-man Heavyweight Tournament. Werdum lost to Overeem by unanimous decision (30–27, 30–27, and 29–28). He has received some criticism for "pleading" Overeem to fight him on the ground in order to get into a position favorable to him due to his Brazilian jiu-jitsu background.

=== Ultimate Fighting Championship return ===
On 8 November 2011, Werdum made his return to the UFC via contract-signing. It was speculated that his return fight might be against Brendan Schaub, a fight he expressed an interest in. The bout, however, did not materialize.

Instead, for his return match, Werdum faced Roy Nelson at UFC 143 on 4 February 2012. He won the fight via unanimous decision (30–27, 30–27, and 30–27). The back and forth action earned Fight of the Night honors.

Werdum next faced Mike Russow on 23 June 2012, at UFC 147. Werdum won the match against Russow in the first-round via TKO.

Werdum coached opposite Antônio Rodrigo Nogueira on the second season of The Ultimate Fighter: Brazil. The two met in a rematch at the conclusion of the season, on 8 June 2013, at UFC on Fuel TV: Nogueira vs. Werdum. He won the fight via verbal submission due to an armbar in the second round. The victory also gives him the distinction of being the only fighter to hold submission victories over both Fedor Emelianenko and Antônio Rodrigo Nogueira both whom were former PRIDE FC Heavyweight Champions.

Werdum faced Travis Browne at UFC on Fox 11 in a Heavyweight title eliminator bout. Despite being a betting underdog and considered at a disadvantage in terms of striking, Werdum dominated the fight for nearly all five rounds. He won the fight via unanimous decision (49–46, 50–45, and 50–45).

==== Heavyweight title ====
On 29 April 2014, the UFC announced that Werdum and heavyweight champion Cain Velasquez had been selected as coaches for the inaugural installment of The Ultimate Fighter: Latin America, with the two expected to face each other on 15 November 2014 at UFC 180.

On 21 October 2014, it was announced that Velasquez pulled out of the bout due to a knee injury. Werdum instead faced Mark Hunt for the interim UFC Heavyweight Championship at UFC 180. Despite being dropped by punches early on, he won the fight via TKO in the second round, becoming the new UFC interim Heavyweight Champion. The win also earned Werdum his first Performance of the Night bonus award.

A rescheduled bout with Velasquez took place on 13 June 2015, at UFC 188 in Mexico City. In a back-and-forth affair, Werdum won the fight in the third round by guillotine choke submission. The win earned Werdum his second consecutive Performance of the Night bonus award. With the victory, Werdum unified the UFC's heavyweight titles and became the undisputed champion. Subsequently, Werdum signed a new, eight-fight contract with the UFC.

==== Losing the Heavyweight Championship ====
A rematch with Velasquez was expected to take place on 6 February 2016, at UFC Fight Night 82. However, Velasquez pulled out of the bout due to a back injury on 23 January and was replaced by Stipe Miocic. On the following day, Werdum announced that he was pulling out of the event due to an injury as well. The bout with Miocic was rescheduled and took place on 14 May 2016, at UFC 198. Werdum lost the fight via knockout in the first round after rushing in with an attempted flurry of punches and was caught with a counter right hook, suffering his first defeat since June 2011.

==== Post-title ====
Werdum was expected to face Ben Rothwell on 10 September 2016 at UFC 203. However, Rothwell pulled out of the fight on 11 August citing a knee injury and was replaced by former opponent Travis Browne. Werdum won the fight by unanimous decision. After the bout, Travis' coach Edmond Tarverdyan angrily confronted Werdum, who push kicked the coach in the chest and raise his hands to defend himself. This resulted in both fighter corners having to get involved to separate the two men. No disciplinary action was taken against Werdum for the incident.

Werdum was expected to face Cain Velasquez in a rematch at UFC 207 on 30 December 2016. However the Nevada State Athletic Commission failed to approve Velasquez to fight, determining after physical examinations and interviews that he was unfit to compete.

The bout with Ben Rothwell was rescheduled and expected to take place on 13 May 2017 at UFC 211. The bout was canceled due to Rothwell failing a drug test.

A third fight with Alistair Overeem took place on 8 July 2017 at UFC 213. Although coming close to finishing Overeem in the third round, Werdum lost the bout via somewhat controversial majority decision.

Werdum was expected to face Derrick Lewis on 7 October 2017 at UFC 216. However, the day of the event Lewis was unable to fight due to back issues. Werdum agreed to face last-minute replacement Walt Harris on the card. After securing a single leg takedown almost immediately, Werdum quickly secured back mount and transitioned to an armbar for the victory just over a minute into the fight.

Werdum faced Marcin Tybura on 19 November 2017 at UFC Fight Night: Werdum vs. Tybura. He dominated most of the action and won the fight via unanimous decision.

Werdum faced Alexander Volkov on 17 March 2018 at UFC Fight Night 127. He lost the back-and-forth fight via knockout in the fourth round.

==== USADA suspension ====
Werdum was expected to face Alexey Oleynik on 15 September 2018 at UFC Fight Night 136. However, on 22 May, Fabrício Werdum was flagged for a potential USADA doping violation. In September 2018 it was revealed that the substance in question was trenbolone and as a result he was suspended from competition for 2 years. He was eligible to return in May 2020. Having two fights left in his contract, Werdum announced that he has requested for a release from the UFC. Subsequently, Werdum's 2-year suspension was reduced to 10 months for substantial assistance.

==== Return from suspension ====
Werdum was expected to face Alexey Oleynik on 9 May 2020 at UFC 250. However, on April 9, Dana White, the president of UFC announced that this event was postponed and the bout eventually took place on May 9, 2020, at UFC 249. Werdum lost the fight via split decision.

Werdum faced Alexander Gustafsson on July 26, 2020, at UFC on ESPN 14, the latter making his debut at heavyweight. He won the fight via an armbar submission in round one. This win earned him the Performance of the Night award. After the fight, Werdum chose not to re-sign with the UFC.

=== Professional Fighters League ===
On November 16, 2020, Werdum announced he had signed a multi-fight deal with the Professional Fighters League promotion and will compete in the 2021 PFL heavyweight tournament. He made his promotional debut against Team Nogueira fighter Renan Ferreira on May 6, 2021, at PFL 3. He lost the fight via technical knockout in the first round. The loss was surrounded by controversy as replays showed Ferreira tapping out while Werdum had him locked into a triangle choke right before Ferreira finished Werdum. On May 10, the New Jersey State Athletic Control Board announced that Ferreira's TKO win against Werdum was overturned to a no contest due to the controversy of the stoppage.

Werdum was scheduled to face Brandon Sayles on June 25, 2021, at PFL 6. However, it was later announced that Werdum had pulled out due to injuries suffered in his last bout.

=== Gamebred FC ===
After over two years away from competing in the sport, Werdum announced that he had signed a new contract with an unnamed promotion. Werdum was then booked to compete against in a rematch against Junior Dos Santos in a bare knuckle MMA fight at a Gamebred FC event on September 8, 2023. He lost the fight by split decision.

=== Global Fight League ===
On December 11, 2024, it was announced that Werdum was signed by Global Fight League.

Werdum was scheduled to face Frank Mir at a to be announced date and location. However, the bout was cancelled in March 2025 as a result of Mir having to undergo an emergency surgery. In turn, Werdum had to withdraw from the season due to an injury. Furthermore, in April 2025, it was reported that all GFL events were cancelled indefinitely.

== Schools and instruction ==
On 4 October 2015 Werdum signed a contract with Chechen Akhmat Fight Club to represent the club.

== Championships and accomplishments ==
=== Mixed martial arts ===
- Ultimate Fighting Championship
  - UFC Heavyweight Championship (One time)
  - Interim UFC Heavyweight Championship (One time)
  - Fight of the Night (One time) vs. Roy Nelson
  - Performance of the Night (Three times) vs. Mark Hunt, Cain Velasquez and Alexander Gustafsson
  - UFC.com Awards
    - 2013: Ranked #6 Submission of the Year vs. Antônio Rodrigo Nogueira
    - 2014: Ranked #7 Fighter of the Year & Ranked #7 Knockout of the Year vs. Mark Hunt
- Strikeforce
  - 2010 Submission of the Year vs. Fedor Emelianenko on 26 June
  - 2010 Upset of the Year vs. Fedor Emelianenko on 26 June
- World MMA Awards
  - 2010 Submission of the Year vs. Fedor Emelianenko at Strikeforce: Fedor vs. Werdum
- Sherdog
  - 2010 Submission of the Year vs. Fedor Emelianenko on 26 June
  - 2010 Upset of the Year vs. Fedor Emelianenko on 26 June
  - 2012 All-Violence Second Team
- Bleacher Report
  - 2010 Submission of the Year vs. Fedor Emelianenko on 26 June
  - 2010 Upset of the Year vs. Fedor Emelianenko on 26 June
  - 2014 #9 Ranked Fighter of the Year
  - 2015 Submission of the Year vs. Cain Velasquez at UFC 188
- MMA Junkie
  - 2015 #2 Ranked Submission of the Year vs. Cain Velasquez at UFC 188
  - 2015 June Submission of the Month vs. Cain Velasquez
- MMA Fighting
  - 2010 Submission of the Year vs. Fedor Emelianenko on 26 June
- FIGHT! Magazine
  - 2010 Upset of the Year vs. Fedor Emelianenko on 26 June
- Fight Matrix
  - 2010 Upset of the Year vs. Fedor Emelianenko on 26 June
  - Lineal MMA Heavyweight Champion (two times)

=== Submission grappling ===
- International Brazilian Jiu-Jitsu Federation
  - 2004 IBJJF World Jiu-Jitsu Championships Black Belt Gold Medalist
  - 2003 IBJJF World Jiu-Jitsu Championships Black Belt Absolute Bronze Medalist
  - 2003 IBJJF World Jiu-Jitsu Championships Black Belt Gold Medalist
  - 2003 Pan American Championships Black Belt Absolute Silver Medalist
  - 2003 Pan American Championships Black Belt Bronze Medalist
  - 2002 IBJJF World Jiu-Jitsu Championships Brown Belt Bronze Medalist
  - 2002 Pan American Championships Brown Belt Gold Medalist
  - 2001 IBJJF World Jiu-Jitsu Championships Purple Belt Silver Medalist
  - 2001 Pan American Championships Purple Belt Absolute Gold Medalist
  - 2001 Pan American Championships Purple Belt Gold Medalist
  - 2000 IBJJF World Jiu-Jitsu Championships Blue Belt Absolute Gold Medalist
  - 2000 IBJJF World Jiu-Jitsu Championships Blue Belt Gold Medalist
  - 2000 Pan American Championships Blue Belt Gold Medalist
- ADCC Submission Wrestling World Championship
  - 2011 ADCC Submission Wrestling World Championships Silver Medalist
  - 2009 ADCC Submission Wrestling World Championships Gold Medalist
  - 2007 ADCC Submission Wrestling World Championships Gold Medalist
  - 2005 ADCC Submission Wrestling World Championships Bronze Medalist
  - 2003 ADCC Submission Wrestling World Championships Absolute Bronze Medalist
  - 2003 ADCC Submission Wrestling World Championships Silver Medalist

== Personal life ==
Werdum has two daughters with his wife Karine. Werdum is fluent in Portuguese, English and Spanish, having lived in Spain for 10 years, and as his mother is of Spanish descent. Werdum was previously a Spanish-language commentator for the UFC and often comes to the octagon with the Spanish flag, as well as the Brazilian one.

From 2004 to 2006, Werdum lived and trained together with Mirko Filipović in Zagreb, Croatia.

In January 2019, Werdum made the news when he and a lifeguard rescued drowning teenagers at a beach near his home in Torrance, California.

In 2024, Werdum revealed that he had suffered brain lesions and scarring during his MMA career, and had suspected Chronic traumatic encephalopathy.

== Mixed martial arts record ==
Professional record breakdown
35 matches	24 wins	9 losses
By knockout	6	3
By submission	12	0
By decision	6	6
Draws	1	
No contests	1	

Res.	Record	Opponent	Method	Event	Date	Round	Time	Location	Notes
NC	24–9–1 (1)	Renan Ferreira	NC (overturned)	PFL 3 (2021)	6 May 2021	1	2:32	Atlantic City, New Jersey, United States	Originally a TKO (punches) win for Ferreira; overturned after it was determined Ferreira tapped out to a triangle choke applied by Werdum.
Win	24–9–1	Alexander Gustafsson	Submission (armbar)	UFC on ESPN: Whittaker vs. Till	26 July 2020	1	2:30	Abu Dhabi, United Arab Emirates	Performance of the Night.
Loss	23–9–1	Aleksei Oleinik	Decision (split)	UFC 249	9 May 2020	3	5:00	Jacksonville, Florida, United States	
Loss	23–8–1	Alexander Volkov	KO (punches)	UFC Fight Night: Werdum vs. Volkov	17 March 2018	4	1:38	London, England	
Win	23–7–1	Marcin Tybura	Decision (unanimous)	UFC Fight Night: Werdum vs. Tybura	19 November 2017	5	5:00	Sydney, Australia	
Win	22–7–1	Walt Harris	Submission (armbar)	UFC 216	7 October 2017	1	1:05	Las Vegas, Nevada, United States	
Loss	21–7–1	Alistair Overeem	Decision (majority)	UFC 213	8 July 2017	3	5:00	Las Vegas, Nevada, United States	
Win	21–6–1	Travis Browne	Decision (unanimous)	UFC 203	10 September 2016	3	5:00	Cleveland, Ohio, United States	
Loss	20–6–1	Stipe Miocic	KO (punch)	UFC 198	14 May 2016	1	2:47	Curitiba, Brazil	Lost the UFC Heavyweight Championship.
Win	20–5–1	Cain Velasquez	Submission (guillotine choke)	UFC 188	13 June 2015	3	2:13	Mexico City, Mexico	Won and unified the UFC Heavyweight Championship. Performance of the Night.
Win	19–5–1	Mark Hunt	TKO (knee and punches)	UFC 180	15 November 2014	2	2:27	Mexico City, Mexico	Won the interim UFC Heavyweight Championship. Performance of the Night.
Win	18–5–1	Travis Browne	Decision (unanimous)	UFC on Fox: Werdum vs. Browne	19 April 2014	5	5:00	Orlando, Florida, United States	
Win	17–5–1	Antônio Rodrigo Nogueira	Submission (armbar)	UFC on Fuel TV: Nogueira vs. Werdum	8 June 2013	2	2:41	Fortaleza, Brazil	
Win	16–5–1	Mike Russow	TKO (punches)	UFC 147	23 June 2012	1	2:28	Belo Horizonte, Brazil	
Win	15–5–1	Roy Nelson	Decision (unanimous)	UFC 143	4 February 2012	3	5:00	Las Vegas, Nevada, United States	Fight of the Night.
Loss	14–5–1	Alistair Overeem	Decision (unanimous)	Strikeforce: Overeem vs. Werdum	18 June 2011	3	5:00	Dallas, Texas, United States	Strikeforce Heavyweight Grand Prix Quarterfinal.
Win	14–4–1	Fedor Emelianenko	Submission (triangle armbar)	Strikeforce: Fedor vs. Werdum	26 June 2010	1	1:09	San Jose, California, United States	
Win	13–4–1	Antônio Silva	Decision (unanimous)	Strikeforce: Fedor vs. Rogers	7 November 2009	3	5:00	Hoffman Estates, Illinois, United States	
Win	12–4–1	Mike Kyle	Submission (guillotine choke)	Strikeforce: Carano vs. Cyborg	15 August 2009	1	1:24	San Jose, California, United States	
Loss	11–4–1	Junior dos Santos	TKO (punches)	UFC 90	25 October 2008	1	1:20	Rosemont, Illinois, United States	
Win	11–3–1	Brandon Vera	TKO (punches)	UFC 85	7 June 2008	1	4:40	London, England	
Win	10–3–1	Gabriel Gonzaga	TKO (punches)	UFC 80	19 January 2008	2	4:34	Newcastle, England	
Loss	9–3–1	Andrei Arlovski	Decision (unanimous)	UFC 70	21 April 2007	3	5:00	Manchester, England	
Win	9–2–1	Alexander Emelianenko	Submission (arm-triangle choke)	2 Hot 2 Handle: Pride and Honour	12 November 2006	1	3:24	Rotterdam, Netherlands	
Loss	8–2–1	Antônio Rodrigo Nogueira	Decision (unanimous)	Pride Critical Countdown Absolute	1 July 2006	3	5:00	Saitama, Japan	2006 Pride Openweight Grand Prix Quarterfinal.
Win	8–1–1	Alistair Overeem	Submission (kimura)	Pride Total Elimination Absolute	5 May 2006	2	3:43	Osaka, Japan	2006 Pride Openweight Grand Prix Opening round.
Win	7–1–1	John-Olav Einemo	Decision (unanimous)	Pride 31	26 February 2006	3	5:00	Saitama, Japan	
Loss	6–1–1	Sergei Kharitonov	Decision (split)	Pride 30	23 October 2005	3	5:00	Saitama, Japan	
Win	6–0–1	Roman Zentsov	Submission (triangle armbar)	Pride Final Conflict 2005	28 August 2005	1	6:01	Saitama, Japan	
Win	5–0–1	Tom Erikson	Submission (rear-naked choke)	Pride 29	20 February 2005	1	5:29	Saitama, Japan	
Win	4–0–1	Ebenezer Fontes Braga	KO (punch)	Jungle Fight 2	15 May 2004	2	1:28	Manaus, Brazil	
Win	3–0–1	Gabriel Gonzaga	TKO (punches)	Jungle Fight 1	13 September 2003	3	2:11	Manaus, Brazil	
Win	2–0–1	Kristof Midoux	Submission (triangle armbar)	World Absolute Fight 2	22 March 2003	1	4:11	Marrakesh, Morocco	
Draw	1–0–1	James Zikic	Draw	Millennium Brawl 8	22 September 2002	3	5:00	High Wycombe, England	Werdum was deducted one point in round 1 due to an illegal knee.
Win	1–0	Tengiz Tedoradze	Submission (triangle choke)	Millennium Brawl 7	16 June 2002	1	N/A	High Wycombe, England	Heavyweight debut.

== Pay-per-view bouts ==
No.	Event	Fight	Date	Venue	City	PPV Buys
1.	UFC 180	Werdum vs. Hunt	November 15, 2014	Arena Ciudad de México	Mexico City, Mexico	190,000
2.	UFC 188	Velasquez vs. Werdum	June 13, 2015	Arena Ciudad de México	Mexico City, Mexico	300,000
3.	UFC 198	Werdum vs. Miocic	May 14, 2016	Arena da Baixada	Curitiba, Brazil	217,000

== See also ==
- List of Brazilian Jiu-Jitsu practitioners
- List of male mixed martial artists
- List of multi-sport athletes
- List of multi-sport champions
- List of Strikeforce alumni

Achievements
Preceded by Cain Velasquez	18th UFC Heavyweight Champion; 13 June 2015 – 14 May 2016	Succeeded by Stipe Miocic
