= Derrick Lewis =

American mixed martial artist (born 1985)

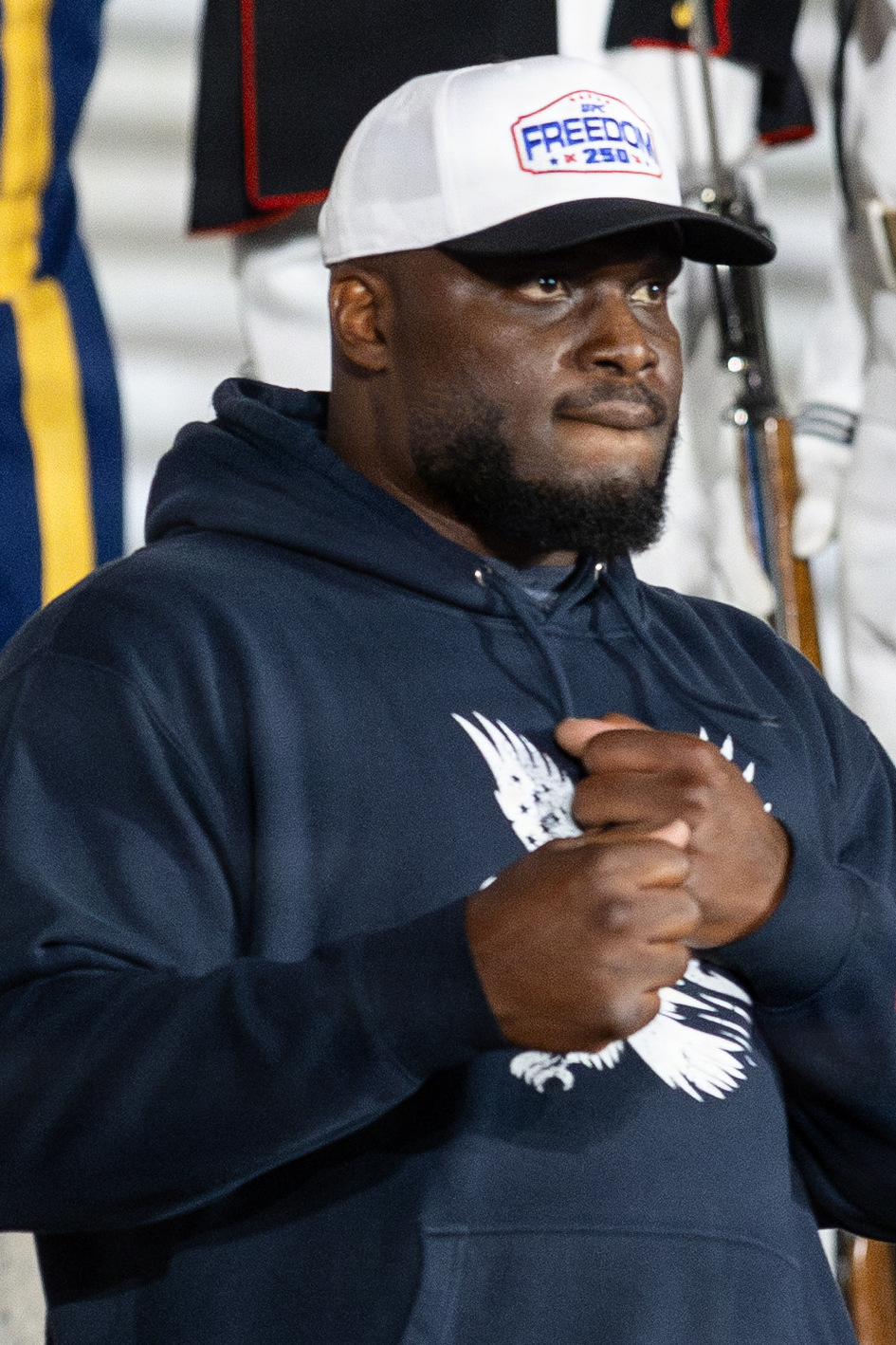
- Lewis in 2026
- Born: Derrick James Lewis; February 7, 1985 (age 41); New Orleans, Louisiana, U.S.
- Other names: The Black Beast
- Height: 6 ft 3 in (191 cm)
- Weight: 265 lb (120 kg; 18 st 13 lb)
- Division: Heavyweight (265 lbs)
- Reach: 79 in (201 cm)
- Fighting out of: Houston, Texas, U.S.
- Team: Silverback Fight Club (formerly); 4oz Fight Club
- Rank: Purple belt in Brazilian Jiu-Jitsu
- Years active: 2010–present (MMA)

Mixed martial arts record
- Total: 44
- Wins: 29
- By knockout: 24
- By submission: 1
- By decision: 4
- Losses: 14
- By knockout: 9
- By submission: 2
- By decision: 3
- No contests: 1

Amateur record
- Total: 1
- Wins: 1
- By knockout: 1

Other information
- Mixed martial arts record from Sherdog

Derrick James Lewis (born February 7, 1985) is an American professional mixed martial artist. He currently competes in the Heavyweight division of the Ultimate Fighting Championship (UFC), where he currently holds the record for most finishes in the Heavyweight division and most knockouts in UFC history (16). A professional since 2010, Lewis has also competed for Bellator MMA and Legacy FC, where he was the Heavyweight Champion.

== Background ==
Born and raised as one of seven siblings, the second oldest, by a single mother in New Orleans, Louisiana, Lewis was troubled growing up and was often involved in street fighting. In 1998, Lewis and his family relocated to Houston, Texas. At the age of 17, Lewis began training in boxing and was preparing for his first amateur fight when the gym unexpectedly shut down. Two weeks after graduating from high school, Lewis was charged with aggravated assault, and was placed on probation. Two years later, while attending Kilgore College on a full scholarship for football, Lewis violated his probation and was sentenced to five years in prison, but ended up serving three and a half. A week after being released, Lewis was introduced to mixed martial arts by a friend and, while working as a tow-truck driver, continued with boxing under the tutelage of George Foreman. After dominating in his first professional mixed martial arts fight, Lewis decided to focus on mixed martial arts.

== Mixed martial arts career ==
=== Early career ===
Lewis began his journey in MMA in late 2009, when he made his debut as an amateur against Jay Ross at LSAMMA on October 16, 2009. He lost the fight via TKO (doctor stoppage). He then faced Tim Buchanan at the United States American Combat Association event on January 30, 2010. He won via TKO.

After turning professional in 2010, Lewis would compile a fight record of 4–1 before signing with Bellator MMA in May 2010.

=== Bellator Fighting Championships ===
Lewis was scheduled to make his promotional debut at Bellator 45 on May 21, 2011, against Brazilian Thiago Santos. However, the bout was canceled when Santos had to pull out due to an injury.

Lewis faced Tony Johnson at Bellator 46 on June 25, 2011. He lost the bout via unanimous decision.

Lewis compiled a record of 6–0 with one no-contest after leaving Bellator, most notably winning and successfully defending the Legacy FC Heavyweight Championship. He was then signed to the UFC.

=== Ultimate Fighting Championship ===
==== 2013–2014 ====
Lewis was scheduled to make his promotional debut against Nandor Guelmino at UFC Fight Night: Condit vs. Kampmann 2 on August 28, 2013. However, the bout was canceled as Lewis had to pull out due to an injury.

Lewis instead made his debut at UFC on Fox: Werdum vs. Browne on April 19, 2014, against Jack May. He won via TKO in the first round.

In his second fight for the promotion, Lewis faced Guto Inocente at The Ultimate Fighter 19 Finale on July 6, 2014. He won the fight via KO in the first round.

Lewis faced Matt Mitrione on September 5, 2014, at UFC Fight Night 50. Mitrione quickly defeated Lewis via first-round knockout.

==== 2015 ====
Lewis faced Ruan Potts on February 28, 2015, at UFC 184. He won the fight via TKO in the second round.

Lewis next had a rematch with Shawn Jordan on June 6, 2015, at UFC Fight Night 68. In their first encounter on the regional circuit in 2010, Lewis lost by unanimous decision. Lewis lost the fight via TKO.

Lewis was expected to face Anthony Hamilton on October 3, 2015, at UFC 192. However, Hamilton was forced out of the bout with an injury and was replaced by Viktor Pešta. Lewis won the fight via TKO in the third round.

==== 2016 ====
Lewis faced Damian Grabowski on February 6, 2016, at UFC Fight Night 82. Lewis dominated the fight, winning via TKO in the first round.

Lewis next faced Gabriel Gonzaga on April 10, 2016, at UFC Fight Night 86. He won via KO in the first round. Subsequently, Lewis earned his first Performance of the Night bonus.

Lewis faced Roy Nelson on July 7, 2016, at UFC Fight Night 90. He won the fight via split decision.

Lewis was expected to face Marcin Tybura on October 15, 2016, at UFC Fight Night 97. However, the promotion announced on October 6 that they had canceled the event entirely.

Lewis faced Shamil Abdurakhimov on December 9, 2016, in the main event at UFC Fight Night 102. After losing the first three rounds, he won the fight via TKO in the fourth round.

==== 2017 ====
Lewis faced Travis Browne on February 19, 2017, in the main event at UFC Fight Night 105. He won the fight via knockout in the second round. Both participants were awarded Fight of the Night for their performance.

Lewis faced Mark Hunt on June 11, 2017, in the main event at UFC Fight Night 110. He lost the fight via TKO in the fourth round. Despite the loss, the win earned Lewis his second consecutive Fight of the Night bonus award. After the loss, during his post-fight interview, Lewis announced that he was likely retiring from mixed martial arts. Later in the month, Lewis revealed that he ultimately decided to continue fighting.

Lewis was expected to face Fabrício Werdum on October 7, 2017, at UFC 216. On the day of the fight, Lewis was forced out of the bout due to a back injury.

==== 2018 ====
Lewis faced Marcin Tybura on February 18, 2018, at UFC Fight Night 126. He won the fight via technical knockout in the third round. This win earned him the Performance of the Night bonus.

Lewis faced Francis Ngannou on July 7, 2018, at UFC 226. He won the fight via unanimous decision, but the fight itself was heavily criticized for the lack of action in both fighters with Lewis only landing 20 strikes, and Ngannou landing 11.

Lewis faced Alexander Volkov on October 6, 2018, at UFC 229. After being behind on the judges' scorecards and visibly hurt multiple times, Lewis won the fight via knockout in the closing seconds of the third round. This win earned him the Performance of the Night award.

Lewis faced Daniel Cormier for the UFC Heavyweight Championship on November 3, 2018, at UFC 230. He lost the fight by rear-naked choke in the second round, marking the first submission loss of his professional MMA career.

==== 2019 ====
Lewis signed a new contract with the UFC after the title shot. As the first fight of his new contract, Lewis faced Junior dos Santos in the main event of UFC Fight Night 146 on March 9, 2019. He lost the fight via TKO in the second round. This fight earned him the Fight of the Night award.

Lewis faced Blagoy Ivanov on November 2, 2019, at UFC 244. He won the fight via split decision.

==== 2020–2021 ====
Lewis faced Ilir Latifi on February 8, 2020, at UFC 247. He won the bout via unanimous decision.

Lewis faced Aleksei Oleinik on August 8, 2020, at UFC Fight Night 174. He won the bout via TKO early in round two. Lewis also set the record for most knockouts by a heavyweight in UFC history.

Lewis was scheduled to face Curtis Blaydes on November 28, 2020, at UFC on ESPN 18. However, the day before the fight, Blaydes tested positive for COVID-19 and the bout was scrapped from the card. The pair faced off at UFC Fight Night 185 on February 20, 2021. Lewis won the fight via knockout in the second round. This win earned him the Performance of the Night award.

Lewis faced Ciryl Gane on August 7, 2021, at UFC 265 for the Interim UFC Heavyweight Championship. Lewis lost the fight via technical knockout in round three.

Lewis faced Chris Daukaus on December 18, 2021, at UFC Fight Night 199. Lewis won the fight via knockout in the first round. With his knockout win over Daukaus, Lewis earned the record for the most knockouts in UFC history regardless of weight division, with 13 altogether. When asked by Michael Bisping in his UFC Fight Night 199 Octagon interview, how he felt about achieving the record, Lewis replied "I’m feeling good, and I’m also happy that I’m the first fighter, clean fighter, to be number one in knockouts".

==== 2022–2023 ====
Lewis faced Tai Tuivasa on February 12, 2022, at UFC 271 in Houston, Texas. Lewis lost the fight via knockout in the second round.

Lewis faced Sergei Pavlovich on July 30, 2022, at UFC 277. He lost the fight via TKO, just 55 seconds into the first round, however there was controversy as the stoppage by referee Dan Miragliotta was considered premature by fighters and fans alike. Lewis received the Crypto.com "Fan Bonus of the Night" award paid in bitcoin of US$10,000 for third place.

Lewis was next expected to face Serghei Spivac at UFC Fight Night 215 on November 19, 2022. However, Lewis was forced to pull out of the event due to non-COVID, non-weight cutting illness and the bout was canceled. The pair was rescheduled for UFC Fight Night 218 on February 4, 2023. Lewis lost the fight via an arm-triangle choke in round one, and he did not land a single strike during the fight.

Lewis faced Marcos Rogério de Lima on July 29, 2023, at UFC 291. He won the fight via technical knockout after a flying knee 33 seconds into round one, thus extending his UFC record of most knockouts to fourteen. The win also earned Lewis the Performance of the Night bonus award.

Lewis faced Jailton Almeida, replacing Curtis Blaydes, on November 4, 2023, at UFC Fight Night 231. He lost the fight via unanimous decision.

==== 2024 ====
Lewis faced Rodrigo Nascimento on May 11, 2024, at UFC on ESPN 56. After landing a knockdown, he won the fight via technical knockout from ground punches in the third round.

Lewis was originally scheduled to face Alexander Romanov on November 2, 2024 at UFC Fight Night 246. However, opponents were changed for unknown reasons and Lewis was going to face Jhonata Diniz instead. After the weigh-ins, Lewis was forced to withdraw from the fight due to non-weight cut related medical issues causing the bout between Lewis and Diniz to be scrapped.

==== 2025–2026 ====
Lewis faced Tallison Teixeira on July 12, 2025 at UFC on ESPN 70. He won the fight by technical knockout 35 seconds into the first round.

Lewis faced former LFA Heavyweight Champion Waldo Cortes-Acosta on January 24, 2026 at UFC 324. He lost the fight via technical knockout in round two.

Lewis faced Josh Hokit on June 14, 2026 at UFC Freedom 250. He lost the fight by technical knockout in the second round.

== Fighting style ==
Lewis has been characterized as a 'classic heavyweight' owing to his knockout power and physique. Former welterweight title contender and analyst Dan Hardy described him as a "wrecking ball", adding "Every time we've spoken about Derrick Lewis before, regardless of whether he's fighting Daniel Cormier, or whether he's fighting Volkov, or whether he's fighting Ciryl Gane, the same thing is always present. If he lands that right hand, it's game over."

Lewis greatly prefers stand-up fighting, which he refers to as "swangin' and banging", and has been noted by fans and commentators for his surprising ability to seemingly shrug off the grappling/wrestling offense of his opponents while in the bottom position, and simply "stand up". However, analysts have noted that when facing fighters with a background in folkstyle wrestling, such as Daniel Cormier, Lewis finds it more difficult to escape the bottom position. Nonetheless, Lewis appeared to simply "stand up" when threatened with a crucifix position by Roy Nelson, a fighter with a jiu-jitsu pedigree.

== Personal life ==
Lewis married his long-time girlfriend in Honolulu, Hawaii, on June 17, 2017. They have two sons and one daughter.

During the flooding caused by Hurricane Harvey in 2017, Lewis pulled an estimated 100 people from the flood waters in Houston, Texas, via his lifted truck.

On May 18, 2021, Lewis was returning to his car after a workout when he discovered a man allegedly trying to open the door of his vehicle. Lewis reportedly struck the alleged thief and pinned him to the ground until the police arrived.

== Championships and accomplishments ==
- Ultimate Fighting Championship
  - Performance of the Night (Five times) vs. Gabriel Gonzaga, Marcin Tybura, Alexander Volkov, Curtis Blaydes, and Marcos Rogério de Lima
  - Fight of the Night (Three times) vs. Travis Browne, Mark Hunt, and Junior dos Santos
    - Tied (Stefan Struve) for second most Post-Fight bonuses in UFC Heavyweight division history (8)
  - Most knockouts in UFC history (16)
    - Most knockouts in UFC Heavyweight division history (16)
  - Most finishes in UFC Heavyweight division history (16)
    - Tied (Donald Cerrone) for third most finishes in UFC history (16)
  - Second most wins in UFC Heavyweight division history (20) (behind Andrei Arlovski)
  - Second most bouts in UFC Heavyweight division history (32) (behind Andrei Arlovski)
  - Second most knockdowns landed in UFC Heavyweight division history (11) (behind Junior dos Santos)
  - Second most total fight time in UFC Heavyweight division history (4:33:59) (behind Andrei Arlovski)
  - Latest comeback finish by striking deficit in a finished fight (-82) vs Alexander Volkov
  - Most knockouts stemming from ground strikes in UFC history (9)
  - UFC.com Awards
    - 2016: Ranked #10 Fighter of the Year
    - 2018: Ranked #10 Knockout of the Year vs. Alexander Volkov
    - 2021: Ranked #9 Knockout of the Year vs. Curtis Blaydes
- Legacy Fighting Championship
  - Legacy FC Heavyweight Championship (One time)
    - One successful title defense
- MMA Sucka
  - 2018 Comeback of the Year vs. Alexander Volkov at UFC 229
- MMA Junkie
  - 2018 Comeback of the Year vs. Alexander Volkov
- MMADNA.nl
  - 2018 Comeback of the Year vs. Alexander Volkov

== Mixed martial arts record ==
Professional record breakdown
44 matches	29 wins	14 losses
By knockout	24	9
By submission	1	2
By decision	4	3
No contests	1	

Res.	Record	Opponent	Method	Event	Date	Round	Time	Location	Notes
Loss	29–14 (1)	Josh Hokit	TKO (punches)	UFC Freedom 250	June 14, 2026	2	4:09	Washington, D.C., United States	
Loss	29–13 (1)	Waldo Cortes-Acosta	TKO (punches)	UFC 324	January 24, 2026	2	3:14	Las Vegas, Nevada, United States	
Win	29–12 (1)	Tallison Teixeira	TKO (punches)	UFC on ESPN: Lewis vs. Teixeira	July 12, 2025	1	0:35	Nashville, Tennessee, United States	Extended the UFC record for most knockout wins (16).
Win	28–12 (1)	Rodrigo Nascimento	TKO (punches)	UFC on ESPN: Lewis vs. Nascimento	May 11, 2024	3	0:49	St. Louis, Missouri, United States	
Loss	27–12 (1)	Jailton Almeida	Decision (unanimous)	UFC Fight Night: Almeida vs. Lewis	November 4, 2023	5	5:00	São Paulo, Brazil	
Win	27–11 (1)	Marcos Rogério de Lima	TKO (punches)	UFC 291	July 29, 2023	1	0:33	Salt Lake City, Utah, United States	Broke the UFC record for most knockout wins (14). Performance of the Night.
Loss	26–11 (1)	Serghei Spivac	Submission (arm-triangle choke)	UFC Fight Night: Lewis vs. Spivac	February 4, 2023	1	3:05	Las Vegas, Nevada, United States	
Loss	26–10 (1)	Sergei Pavlovich	TKO (punches)	UFC 277	July 30, 2022	1	0:55	Dallas, Texas, United States	
Loss	26–9 (1)	Tai Tuivasa	KO (elbow)	UFC 271	February 12, 2022	2	1:40	Houston, Texas, United States	
Win	26–8 (1)	Chris Daukaus	KO (punches)	UFC Fight Night: Lewis vs. Daukaus	December 18, 2021	1	3:36	Las Vegas, Nevada, United States	
Loss	25–8 (1)	Ciryl Gane	TKO (punches)	UFC 265	August 7, 2021	3	4:11	Houston, Texas, United States	For the interim UFC Heavyweight Championship.
Win	25–7 (1)	Curtis Blaydes	KO (punch)	UFC Fight Night: Blaydes vs. Lewis	February 20, 2021	2	1:26	Las Vegas, Nevada, United States	Performance of the Night.
Win	24–7 (1)	Aleksei Oleinik	TKO (punches)	UFC Fight Night: Lewis vs. Oleinik	August 8, 2020	2	0:21	Las Vegas, Nevada, United States	
Win	23–7 (1)	Ilir Latifi	Decision (unanimous)	UFC 247	February 8, 2020	3	5:00	Houston, Texas, United States	
Win	22–7 (1)	Blagoy Ivanov	Decision (split)	UFC 244	November 2, 2019	3	5:00	New York City, New York, United States	
Loss	21–7 (1)	Junior dos Santos	TKO (punches)	UFC Fight Night: Lewis vs. dos Santos	March 9, 2019	2	1:58	Wichita, Kansas, United States	Fight of the Night.
Loss	21–6 (1)	Daniel Cormier	Submission (rear-naked choke)	UFC 230	November 3, 2018	2	2:14	New York City, New York, United States	For the UFC Heavyweight Championship.
Win	21–5 (1)	Alexander Volkov	KO (punches)	UFC 229	October 6, 2018	3	4:49	Las Vegas, Nevada, United States	UFC heavyweight title eliminator. Performance of the Night.
Win	20–5 (1)	Francis Ngannou	Decision (unanimous)	UFC 226	July 7, 2018	3	5:00	Las Vegas, Nevada, United States	
Win	19–5 (1)	Marcin Tybura	KO (punches)	UFC Fight Night: Cowboy vs. Medeiros	February 18, 2018	3	2:48	Austin, Texas, United States	Performance of the Night.
Loss	18–5 (1)	Mark Hunt	TKO (punches)	UFC Fight Night: Lewis vs. Hunt	June 11, 2017	4	3:51	Auckland, New Zealand	Fight of the Night.
Win	18–4 (1)	Travis Browne	KO (punches)	UFC Fight Night: Lewis vs. Browne	February 19, 2017	2	3:12	Halifax, Nova Scotia, Canada	Fight of the Night.
Win	17–4 (1)	Shamil Abdurakhimov	TKO (punches)	UFC Fight Night: Lewis vs. Abdurakhimov	December 9, 2016	4	3:42	Albany, New York, United States	
Win	16–4 (1)	Roy Nelson	Decision (split)	UFC Fight Night: dos Anjos vs. Alvarez	July 7, 2016	3	5:00	Las Vegas, Nevada, United States	
Win	15–4 (1)	Gabriel Gonzaga	KO (punches)	UFC Fight Night: Rothwell vs. dos Santos	April 10, 2016	1	4:48	Zagreb, Croatia	Performance of the Night.
Win	14–4 (1)	Damian Grabowski	TKO (punches)	UFC Fight Night: Hendricks vs. Thompson	February 6, 2016	1	2:17	Las Vegas, Nevada, United States	
Win	13–4 (1)	Viktor Pešta	TKO (punches)	UFC 192	October 3, 2015	3	1:15	Houston, Texas, United States	
Loss	12–4 (1)	Shawn Jordan	TKO (hook kick and punches)	UFC Fight Night: Boetsch vs. Henderson	June 6, 2015	2	0:48	New Orleans, Louisiana, United States	
Win	12–3 (1)	Ruan Potts	TKO (punches)	UFC 184	February 28, 2015	2	3:18	Los Angeles, California, United States	
Loss	11–3 (1)	Matt Mitrione	KO (punches)	UFC Fight Night: Jacaré vs. Mousasi	September 5, 2014	1	0:41	Mashantucket, Connecticut, United States	
Win	11–2 (1)	Guto Inocente	KO (punches)	The Ultimate Fighter: Team Edgar vs. Team Penn Finale	July 6, 2014	1	3:30	Las Vegas, Nevada, United States	
Win	10–2 (1)	Jack May	TKO (punches)	UFC on Fox: Werdum vs. Browne	April 19, 2014	1	4:23	Orlando, Florida, United States	
Win	9–2 (1)	Ricky Shivers	TKO (punches)	Legacy FC 18	March 1, 2013	3	4:22	Houston, Texas, United States	Defended the Legacy FC Heavyweight Championship.
Win	8–2 (1)	Jared Rosholt	KO (punches)	Legacy FC 13	August 17, 2012	2	4:41	Dallas, Texas, United States	Won the Legacy FC Heavyweight Championship.
Win	7–2 (1)	Justin Frazier	TKO (knee to the body and punches)	RFA 2	March 30, 2012	1	2:37	Kearney, Nebraska, United States	
NC	6–2 (1)	Jeremiah Constant	NC (punches to back of head)	Fight to Win: Paramount Prize Fighting 2012	January 27, 2012	1	0:48	Denver, Colorado, United States	Accidental punches to back of the head rendered Constant unable to continue.
Win	6–2	Rakim Cleveland	TKO (punches)	Legacy FC 9	December 16, 2011	3	3:12	Houston, Texas, United States	
Win	5–2	Jay Peche	TKO (punches)	Immortal Kombat Fighting 1	September 3, 2011	1	0:46	Spring, Texas, United States	
Loss	4–2	Tony Johnson	Decision (unanimous)	Bellator 46	June 25, 2011	3	5:00	Hollywood, Florida, United States	
Win	4–1	Taylor Herbert	TKO (punches)	International Xtreme Fight Association: Extreme Fighting 6	February 26, 2011	1	2:14	Houston, Texas, United States	
Win	3–1	Rakim Cleveland	Submission (armbar)	Worldwide Gladiator 2	November 12, 2010	2	1:33	Pasadena, Texas, United States	
Win	2–1	Ryan Martinez	TKO (punches)	Fight to Win: Worlds Collide	July 24, 2010	2	1:03	Denver, Colorado, United States	
Loss	1–1	Shawn Jordan	Decision (unanimous)	Global Fighting Alliance 7	June 25, 2010	3	5:00	Lafayette, Louisiana, United States	
Win	1–0	Nick Mitchell	TKO (punches)	Worldwide Gladiator 1	April 9, 2010	2	1:33	Pasadena, Texas, United States	Heavyweight debut.

== Pay-per-view bouts ==
No.	Event	Fight	Date	Venue	City	PPV Buys
1.	UFC 230	Cormier vs. Lewis	November 3, 2018	Madison Square Garden	New York City, New York, United States	250,000
2.	UFC 265	Lewis vs. Gane	August 7, 2021	Toyota Center	Houston, Texas, United States	300,000

== See also ==
- List of current UFC fighters
- List of male mixed martial artists

UFC records
Preceded by Matt Brown	Most knockouts July 29, 2023 – present 16	Incumbent
