= Danho =

Danho is a surname. Notable people with the surname include:

- Florian Danho (born 2000), French footballer
- Jarjis Danho (born 1983), Syrian-German mixed martial arts fighter
- Thibaut Amani Danho (born 1994), Ivorian swimmer
