= Jeff Hughes (fighter) =

American mixed martial arts fighter

- Born: May 17, 1988 (age 38); Canton, Ohio, United States
- Other names: Light Out
- Height: 6 ft 2 in (1.88 m)
- Weight: 265 lb (120 kg; 18 st 13 lb)
- Division: Heavyweight
- Reach: 77 in (196 cm)
- Fighting out of: Canton, Ohio, United States
- Team: Evolve MMA and Victory Martial Arts; Strong Style Fight Team (2017–present)
- Years active: 2014–present

Mixed martial arts record
- Total: 15
- Wins: 10
- By knockout: 4
- By submission: 1
- By decision: 5
- Losses: 4
- By knockout: 1
- By submission: 1
- By decision: 2
- No contests: 1

Other information
- Occupation: Truck driver
- Mixed martial arts record from Sherdog

Jeff Hughes (born May 17, 1988) is an American retired mixed martial artist. A professional since 2014, he has also fought in the Ultimate Fighting Championship and Legacy Fighting Alliance, where he was a former heavyweight champion.

== Background ==
Hughes was born and raised in Canton, Ohio. He played basketball and wrestled in high school. He then turned to MMA after he graduated from Canton South High School in his hometown of Canton, Ohio.

== Mixed martial arts career ==
=== Early career ===
After compiling an amateur record of 11-3 from 2007 until 2013, Hughes started his professional MMA career in 2014 and fought under numerous organizations, notably Legacy Fighting Alliance where he was the Heavyweight Champion twice. He amassed a record of 9-1 before competing in Dana White's Contender Series 14.

=== Dana White's Contender Series ===
Hughes appeared in Dana White's Contender Series 14 web-series program on July 24, 2018, facing Josh Appelt. He won the fight via first-round TKO. With this win, Hughes was awarded a contract with the UFC.

=== Ultimate Fighting Championship ===
Hughes made his UFC debut on March 9, 2019 at UFC Fight Night 146 against Daniel Spitz. However, Spitz pulled out of the fight in February citing injury and he was replaced by Maurice Greene. He lost the fight via a split decision.

Hughes faced Todd Duffee on September 14, 2019 at UFC Fight Night 158. The bout ended in the first round as a no contest due to an accidental eye poke that rendered Duffee unable to continue.

Hughes faced Raphael Pessoa on October 26, 2019 at UFC Fight Night 162. He lost the fight via unanimous decision.

Hughes was expected to face promotional newcomer Carlos Felipe on March 14, 2020 at UFC Fight Night 170. Due to the COVID-19 pandemic, the event was eventually postponed .

Hughes faced Juan Espino on September 27, 2020 at UFC 253. He lost the fight via submission in round one.

On October 2, 2020 it was reported that Hughes was released by the UFC.

== Championships and accomplishments ==
- Legacy Fighting Alliance
  - Legacy Fighting Alliance Heavyweight Championship (Two times) vs. Richard Odoms and Maurice Greene

== Mixed martial arts record ==
Professional record breakdown
15 matches	10 wins	4 losses
By knockout	4	1
By submission	1	1
By decision	5	2
No contests	1	

Res.	Record	Opponent	Method	Event	Date	Round	Time	Location	Notes
Loss	10–4 (1)	Juan Espino	Submission (scarf hold choke)	UFC 253	September 27, 2020	1	3:48	Abu Dhabi, United Arab Emirates	
Loss	10–3 (1)	Raphael Pessoa	Decision (unanimous)	UFC Fight Night: Maia vs. Askren	October 26, 2019	3	5:00	Kallang, Singapore	
NC	10–2 (1)	Todd Duffee	NC (accidental eye poke)	UFC Fight Night: Cowboy vs. Gaethje	September 14, 2019	1	4:03	Vancouver, British Columbia, Canada	Accidental eye poke rendered Duffee unable to continue.
Loss	10–2	Maurice Greene	Decision (split)	UFC Fight Night: Lewis vs. dos Santos	March 9, 2019	3	5:00	Wichita, Kansas, United States	
Win	10–1	Josh Appelt	TKO (punches)	Dana White's Contender Series 14	July 24, 2018	1	4:26	Las Vegas, Nevada, United States	
Win	9–1	Maurice Greene	Decision (unanimous)	LFA 38	April 27, 2018	5	5:00	Minneapolis, United States	Defended the LFA Heavyweight Championship.
Win	8–1	Richard Odoms	Decision (unanimous)	LFA 26	November 3, 2017	5	5:00	Houston, Texas, United States	Won the LFA Heavyweight Championship.
Win	7–1	Ryan Pokryfky	Decision (unanimous)	Big Guns 24	June 10, 2017	3	5:00	Tallmadge, Ohio, United States	
Loss	6–1	Dan Spohn	TKO (punches)	IT Fight Series 48	December 10, 2016	5	2:02	Columbus, Ohio, United States	For the vacant IT Fight Series Heavyweight Championship.
Win	6–0	John Hawk	Decision (unanimous)	Big Guns 18	March 19, 2016	3	5:00	Mansfield, Ohio, United States	
Win	5–0	Jason Riley	KO (spinning back kick)	Caged Madness 40	January 16, 2016	1	4:59	Akron, Ohio, United States	
Win	4–0	Curt Lemmon	Decision (unanimous)	Big Guns 16	August 22, 2015	3	5:00	Streetsboro, Ohio, United States	
Win	3–0	Ed Abrasley	TKO (punches)	PA Cage Fight 21	May 30, 2015	1	1:59	Akron, Ohio, United States	
Win	2–0	Leviticus Roberson	TKO (retirement)	RFO: Big Guns 15	March 21, 2015	1	5:00	Akron, Ohio, United States	
Win	1–0	Devon Wilson	Submission (guillotine choke)	Rock N Rumble 8	October 4, 2014	1	3:52	Canton, Ohio, United States	Heavyweight debut.

== See also ==
- List of male mixed martial artists
