= Josh Appelt =

American MMA fighter

- Born: June 19, 1983 (age 43); Yuba City, California, United States
- Other names: The Juggernaut
- Height: 5 ft 11 in (1.80 m)
- Weight: 252.5 lb (114.5 kg; 18.04 st)
- Division: Heavyweight
- Reach: 70 in (178 cm)
- Fighting out of: Sacramento, California, United States
- Team: Team Alpha Male; Mike's Body Shop; Groundworks Jiu-Jitsu House; MMA Gold Fight Team
- Years active: 2009–present

Mixed martial arts record
- Total: 22
- Wins: 15
- By knockout: 11
- By submission: 2
- By decision: 2
- Losses: 7
- By knockout: 3
- By submission: 1
- By decision: 3

Other information
- Mixed martial arts record from Sherdog

Josh Appelt is a retired American mixed martial artist who competed in the Heavyweight division. A professional competitor since 2009, he has competed for Bellator and King of the Cage.

== Background ==
Born and raised in California, Appelt wrestled in high school, competing in the state tournament twice during his junior and senior seasons. Appelt was originally introduced to mixed martial arts through fellow competitor Dave Huckaba, who Appelt helped with grappling during a training camp for a fight. A few months later, Appelt embarked upon his own career in MMA.

== Mixed martial arts career ==
=== Early career: Gladiator Challenge ===
Appelt started his career in 2009. He fought mainly for California-based promotion Gladiator Challenge.

Appelt faced Angel DeAnda on July 17, 2010 for the Gladiator Challenge Heavyweight Championship. Appelt was defeated for the first time in his career via first-round TKO.

Appelt fought once again for the title on December 11, 2010 against Rob Jackson. Appelt won via TKO in the first round to become the new Gladiator Challenge Heavyweight Champion.

In 2012, with an overall record of 7-2, Appelt signed with Bellator.

=== Bellator ===
Appelt made his promotional debut against Ed Carpenter on November 2, 2012 at Bellator 79. He won via submission in the first round.

Appelt faced Josh Lanier on February 28, 2013 at Bellator 91. He won via TKO in the second round.

Just a week after his bout against Lanier, Appelt replaced Maurice Jackson against Manny Lara on March 7, 2013 at Bellator 92. He won via unanimous decision. Applet lost his last Bellator fight against Freddie Aquintania on April 4, 2014. Following the loss, Applet suffered two more defeats fighting in WFC.

On August 29, 2016, it was announced that Applet will face Bobby Lashley on October 21, 2016 at Bellator 162 after he picked up two consecutive wins fighting in WFC. Applet lost the fight via rear-naked choke submission in the second round.

== Championships and accomplishments ==
=== Mixed martial arts ===
- Gladiator Challenge
  - Gladiator Challenge Heavyweight Championship (Two times; current)
  - One Successful Title Defense
- West Coast Fighting Championship
  - WFC Heavyweight Championship (One time, current)

== Mixed martial arts record ==
Professional record breakdown
22 matches	15 wins	7 losses
By knockout	11	3
By submission	2	1
By decision	2	3

Res.	Record	Opponent	Method	Event	Date	Round	Time	Location	Notes
Loss	15–7	Jeff Hughes	TKO (punches)	Dana White's Contender Series 14	July 24, 2018	1	4:26	Las Vegas, Nevada, United States	
Win	15-6	Anthony MacDonald	TKO (punches)	KOTC: Last Stand	October 7, 2017	1	0:48	Oroville, California, United States	
Win	14-6	Shannon Ritch	TKO (punches)	Gladiator Challenge: Contenders	May 20, 2017	1	1:08	Lincoln, California, United States	Defended Gladiator Challenge Heavyweight Championship.
Win	13-6	Ben Beebe	TKO (punches)	Gladiator Challenge: Mega Brawl	February 26, 2017	1	1:09	Lincoln, California, United States	Won the vacant Gladiator Challenge Heavyweight Championship.
Loss	12–6	Bobby Lashley	Submission (rear-naked choke)	Bellator 162	October 21, 2016	2	1:43	Memphis, Tennessee, United States	
Win	12–5	Roy Boughton	TKO (punches)	WFC 16: King of Sacramento	January 23, 2016	2	4:58	Sacramento, California, United States	Won the vacant WFC Heavyweight Championship.
Win	11–5	Joe Hernandez	TKO (punches)	WFC 15: Griffin vs. Wallace	October 10, 2015	1	1:58	Sacramento, California, United States	
Loss	10–5	Josue Lugo	TKO (punches)	WFC 13: Huckaba vs.Mitchell	February 28, 2015	1	0:14	Sacramento, California, United States	
Loss	10–4	Carl Seumanutafa	Decision (unanimous)	West Coast Fighting Championship 12	November 15, 2014	3	5:00	Sacramento, California, United States	
Loss	10–3	Freddie Aquitania	Decision (unanimous)	Bellator 115	April 4, 2014	3	5:00	Reno, Nevada, United States	
Win	10–2	Manny Lara	Decision (unanimous)	Bellator 92	March 7, 2013	3	5:00	Temecula, California, United States	
Win	9–2	Josh Lanier	TKO (punches)	Bellator 91	February 28, 2013	2	0:16	Rio Rancho, New Mexico, United States	
Win	8–2	Ed Carpenter	Submission (rear-naked choke)	Bellator 79	November 2, 2012	1	3:20	Rama, Ontario, Canada	
Win	7–2	C.J. Leveque	TKO (punches)	West Coast Fighting Championship: Showdown	June 9, 2012	2	2:43	Yuba City, California, United States	
Win	6–2	Rob Jackson	TKO (punches)	Gladiator Challenge: Mega Stars	December 11, 2011	1	N/A	Lincoln, California, United States	Won the Gladiator Challenge Heavyweight Championship.
Win	5–2	Robert Laroski	KO (punch)	Gladiator Challenge: Unleashed	August 27, 2011	1	N/A	Lincoln, California, United States	
Loss	4–2	C.J. Leveque	Decision (unanimous)	Rebel Fights	April 16, 2011	3	3:00	Plymouth, California, United States	
Loss	4–1	Angel DeAnda	TKO (punches)	Gladiator Challenge: Patriots	July 17, 2010	1	2:56	Placerville, California, United States	For the Gladiator Challenge Heavyweight Championship.
Win	4–0	Marcus Osbourn	Submission (rear-naked choke)	Gladiator Challenge: Champions	May 1, 2010	1	1:39	Placerville, California, United States	
Win	3–0	Keith Corum	TKO (punches)	Battle of the Valley 2	October 2, 2009	3	2:36	Stockton, California, United States	
Win	2–0	Michael Woodworth	Decision (unanimous)	Gladiator Challenge: Validation	June 26, 2009	3	5:00	Roseville, California, United States	
Win	1–0	Mike Martin	TKO (punches)	Gladiator Challenge: Put Up or Shut Up	May 31, 2009	1	0:48	Lakeport, California, United States	

== See also ==
- List of male mixed martial artists
