= Justin Frazier =

American mixed martial arts fighter

- Born: June 15, 1989 (age 37); Charleston, South Carolina, United States
- Other names: The Grizzly Bear
- Height: 6 ft 0 in (1.83 m)
- Weight: 281 lb (127 kg; 20 st 1 lb)
- Division: Heavyweight
- Reach: 75 in (191 cm)
- Stance: Southpaw
- Fighting out of: Batesville, Arkansas, United States
- Team: Without Limits MMA
- Years active: 2010–present

Mixed martial arts record
- Total: 16
- Wins: 12
- By knockout: 8
- By submission: 3
- By decision: 1
- Losses: 4
- By knockout: 3
- By submission: 1

Other information
- Mixed martial arts record from Sherdog

Justin Frazier (born June 15, 1989) is an American mixed martial artist who competes in the heavyweight division. He most notably competed in the Ultimate Fighting Championship and Bellator MMA.

== Background ==
Frazier graduated from Cave City High School in 2008, then played football at Arkansas Tech University. After a knee injury derailed his football career, Frazier received degrees at both University of Arkansas Community College at Batesville and at Arkansas State University.

== Mixed martial arts career ==
=== Early career ===
Starting his career in 2010, Frazier compiled a 10–2 record fighting for various regional organizations and Bellator MMA. At Bellator 52 on October 1, 2011, Frazier faced Liron Wilson and easily dispatched off him via GnP in the first round. In his next fight afterward, Frazier faced future UFC Heavyweight title contender Derrick Lewis at RFA 2 on March 30, 2012. He lost via TKO in the first round.

At Bellator 120 on May 17, 2014, Frazier waged a sloppy slugfest with Mike Wessel that ended in a Wessel TKO in the first round. After this win, Frazier would take a couple of years off to deal with the medical issues off his son.

=== The Ultimate Fighter ===
In August 2017, it was announced that Frazier was one of the fighters featured on The Ultimate Fighter: Heavy Hitters UFC TV series.

Frazier was the seventh pick by coach Kelvin Gastelum. In the quarter-finals, Frazier defeated Anderson da Silva via unanimous decision after two rounds. In the semi-finals, Frazier defeated Michel Batista via technical knockout in Round One. This win secured Frazier a spot in the finals against Juan Espino.

=== Ultimate Fighting Championship ===
In The Ultimate Fighter: Heavy Hitters Finale on November 30, 2018, Frazier faced Juan Espino. He lost the bout in quick fashion via straight armlock in the first round.

In February 2019, Frazier revealed that he was released from his UFC contract.

=== Post UFC ===
After his release from the UFC, Frazier faced Kevin Sears at C3 Fights 47 on January 12, 2019. He won the bout via unanimous decision. He then faced Ben Rowland at Pyramid Fights 12 on June 22, 2019, winning the bout via first round submission.

== Personal life ==
Frazier’s son was born with a congenital birth defect, hypoplastic left heart syndrome, that prevents the oxygen-rich blood from circulating the body, leading to a heart transplant just two weeks into his heart, and complications afterwards led to a battle with cancer in 2012.

== Mixed martial arts record ==
Professional record breakdown
| 16 matches | 12 wins | 4 losses |
| By knockout | 8 | 3 |
| By submission | 3 | 1 |
| By decision | 1 | 0 |

| Res. | Record | Opponent | Method | Event | Date | Round | Time | Location | Notes |
|---|---|---|---|---|---|---|---|---|---|
| Loss | 12–4 | Allen Frye | TKO (punches) | RDC 21 | September 6, 2025 | 1 | 2:54 | Batesville, Arkansas, United States | |
| Win | 12–3 | Ben Rowland | Submission (choke) | Pyramid Fights 12 | June 22, 2019 | 1 | 0:58 | Batesville, Arkansas, United States | |
| Win | 11–3 | Kevin Sears | Decision (unanimous) | C3 Fights 47 | January 12, 2019 | 3 | 5:00 | Newkirk, Oklahoma, United States | |
| Loss | 10–3 | Juan Espino | Submission (straight armlock) | The Ultimate Fighter: Heavy Hitters Finale | November 30, 2018 | 1 | 3:36 | Las Vegas, Nevada, United States | For The Ultimate Fighter 28 Heavyweight Tournament. |
| Win | 10–2 | Reggie Cato | TKO (punches) | Pyramid Fights 6 | March 17, 2018 | 1 | 2:37 | Batesville, Arkansas, United States | |
| Win | 9–2 | Parnell Davis | Submission (forearm choke) | Revolution Combat Championships 14 | December 29, 2017 | 1 | 1:00 | Cedar Rapids, Iowa, United States | Catchweight (285 lb) bout. |
| Win | 8–2 | Carlton Little Sr. | TKO (punches) | Pyramid Fights 3 | August 12, 2017 | 1 | 1:43 | Batesville, Arkansas, United States | |
| Loss | 7–2 | Mike Wessel | TKO (punches) | Bellator 120 | May 17, 2014 | 1 | 4:28 | Southaven, Mississippi, United States | |
| Win | 7–1 | Terence Landers | TKO (punches) | Off The Chain MMA 3 | October 26, 2013 | 1 | 2:15 | Hot Springs, Arkansas, United States | |
| Win | 6–1 | Chris Miller | TKO (punches) | Mid South MMA Championships 7 | June 9, 2012 | 1 | 3:09 | Caruthersville, Missouri, United States | |
| Loss | 5–1 | Derrick Lewis | TKO (knee to the body and punches) | RFA 2 | March 30, 2012 | 1 | 2:37 | Kearney, Nebraska, United States | |
| Win | 5–0 | Liron Wilson | TKO (punches) | Bellator 52 | October 1, 2011 | 1 | 1:50 | Lake Charles, Louisiana, United States | |
| Win | 4–0 | James Hall | TKO (punches) | AXC 14 | June 24, 2011 | 1 | 2:45 | Bryant, Arkansas, United States | |
| Win | 3–0 | Terence Landers | TKO (punches) | Brickhouse MMA: Beatdown 5 | April 30, 2011 | 1 | 2:31 | Paragould, Arkansas, United States | |
| Win | 2–0 | Ace Lewis | Submission (rear-naked choke) | AXC 12 | February 11, 2011 | 1 | 1:55 | Little Rock, Arkansas, United States | |
| Win | 1–0 | Kevin Casey | TKO (punches) | AXC 11 | December 11, 2010 | 1 | 0:26 | Conway, Arkansas, United States | |

== See also ==
- List of male mixed martial artists
