= Dana White's Contender Series season 2 =

UFC mixed martial arts event in 2018

Dana White's Contender Series
- Season 2

Release
- Original network: UFC Fight Pass
- Original release: June 12 – August 7, 2018

Season chronology
- ← Previous; Season 1 Next → Season 3

Season Two of Dana White's Contender Series commenced on June 12, 2018.

== Week 1 - June 12 ==
Dana White's Tuesday Night Contender Series 9
- Promotion: DWCS
- Date: June 12, 2018
- Venue: UFC Training Centre
- City: Las Vegas, Nevada, United States

Main Card
Weight class				Method	Round	Time	Notes
Light Heavyweight	Alonzo Menifield	def.	Dashawn Boatwright	TKO (punches)	1	0:08	(Note: This victory represents the fastest stoppage win during a Dana White's Contender Series fight)
Welterweight	Chris Curtis	def.	Sean Lally	TKO (hook kick and punches)	3	1:37
Heavyweight	Greg Hardy	def.	Austen Lane	TKO (punches)	1	0:57
Bantamweight	Montel Jackson	def.	Rico DiSciullo	TKO (knee and punches)	3	2:15	(Note: Jackson was deducted one point in round 1 due to an elbow to the back of the head and one point in round 3 due to eye poke.)
Middleweight	Kevin Holland	def.	Will Santiago	Decision (unanimous) (30–27, 30–27, 30–27)	3	5:00

=== Contract awards ===
The following fighters were awarded contracts with the UFC:

- Alonzo Menifield and Greg Hardy

== Week 2 - June 19 ==
Dana White's Tuesday Night Contender Series 10
- Promotion: DWCS
- Date: June 19, 2018
- Venue: UFC Training Centre
- City: Las Vegas, Nevada, United States

Main Card
Weight class				Method	Round	Time	Notes
Featherweight	Matt Sayles	def.	Yazan Hajeh	TKO (punches)	1	1:57
Middleweight	Anthony Hernandez	vs.	Jordan Wright	NC (overturned by NSAC)	1	0:40	(Note: Originally a KO (punches) win for Hernandez, overturned after he tested positive for cannabis metabolites.)
Featherweight	Austin Springer	def.	Giga Chikadze	Submission (rear-naked choke)	3	4:10
Light Heavyweight	Ryan Spann	def.	Emiliano Sordi	Submission (guillotine choke)	1	0:26
Welterweight	Dwight Grant	def.	Tyler Hill	KO (punches)	2	2:08

=== Contract awards ===
The following fighters were awarded contracts with the UFC:

- Matt Sayles, Anthony Hernandez, Ryan Spann, and Dwight Grant

== Week 3 - June 26 ==
Dana White's Tuesday Night Contender Series 11
- Promotion: DWCS
- Date: June 26, 2018
- Venue: UFC Training Centre
- City: Las Vegas, Nevada, United States

Main Card
Weight class				Method	Round	Time	Notes
Woman's Flyweight	Antonina Shevchenko	def.	Jaymee Nievara	TKO (knees)	2	3:22
Lightweight	Te'Jovan Edwards	def.	Austin Tweedy	KO (punch)	1	0:28
Heavyweight	Josh Parisian	def.	Greg Rebello	KO (spinning backfist)	1	1:31
Featherweight	Julian Erosa	def.	Jamall Emmers	KO (head kick and punches)	2	1:10
Middleweight	Jordan Williams	vs.	Tim Caron	NC (overturned by NSAC)	3	3:37	(Note: Originally a TKO (elbows) win for Williams, overturned after he tested positive for cannabis metabolites.)

=== Contract awards ===
The following fighters were awarded contracts with the UFC:

- Antonina Shevchenko and Te'Jovan Edwards

== Week 4 - July 10 ==
Dana White's Tuesday Night Contender Series 12
- Promotion: DWCS
- Date: July 10, 2018
- Venue: UFC Training Centre
- City: Las Vegas, Nevada, United States

Main Card
Weight class				Method	Round	Time	Notes
Lightweight	Kevin Aguilar	def.	Joey Gomez	Decision (split) (28–29, 29–28, 29–28)	3	5:00
Middleweight	Bevon Lewis	def.	Alton Cunningham	TKO (knees)	1	3:01
Featherweight	Ricky Palacios	def.	Toby Misech	Decision (unanimous) (30–27, 29–28, 29–28)	3	5:00
Flyweight	Jordan Espinosa	def.	Riley Dutro	TKO (punches)	3	4:58
Lightweight	Jalin Turner	def.	Max Mustaki	TKO (doctor stoppage)	1	5:00

=== Contract awards ===
The following fighters were awarded contracts with the UFC:

- Bevon Lewis and Jordan Espinosa

== Week 5 - July 17 ==
Dana White's Tuesday Night Contender Series 13
- Promotion: DWCS
- Date: July 17, 2018
- Venue: UFC Training Centre
- City: Las Vegas, Nevada, United States

Main Card
Weight class				Method	Round	Time	Notes
Women's Strawweight	Maycee Barber	def.	Jamie Colleen	TKO (elbows)	3	4:15
Bantamweight	Domingo Pilarte	def.	Vince Morales	Technical Submission (rear-naked choke)	2	1:52
Middleweight	Chibwikem Onyenegecha	def.	Anthony Adams	Decision (split) (29–28, 28–29, 29–28)	3	5:00
Welterweight	Austin Vanderford	def.	Angelo Trevino	Submission (rear-naked choke)	2	2:42
Middleweight	Edmen Shahbazyan	def.	Antonio Jones	TKO (punches)	1	0:40

=== Contract awards ===
The following fighters were awarded contracts with the UFC:

- Maycee Barber, Domingo Pilarte, and Edmen Shahbazyan

== Week 6 - July 24 ==
Dana White's Tuesday Night Contender Series 14
- Promotion: DWCS
- Date: July 24, 2018
- Venue: UFC Training Centre
- City: Las Vegas, Nevada, United States

Main Card
Weight class				Method	Round	Time	Notes
Lightweight	Alex Muñoz	def.	Nick Newell	Decision (unanimous) (30–27, 30–27, 30–27)	3	5:00
Light Heavyweight	Jimmy Crute	def.	Chris Birchler	TKO (punches)	1	4:23
Featherweight	Sodiq Yusuff	def.	Mike Davis	Decision (unanimous) (30–27, 30–27, 30–27)	3	5:00
Heavyweight	Jeff Hughes	def.	Josh Appelt	KO (punch)	1	4:26
Featherweight	Chase Hooper	def.	Canaan Kawaihae	Decision (unanimous) (29–26, 29–26, 28–26)	3	5:00

=== Contract awards ===
The following fighters were awarded contracts with the UFC:

- Jimmy Crute, Sodiq Yusuff, and Jeff Hughes
- Chase Hooper was signed to a development league contract

== Week 7 - July 31 ==
Dana White's Tuesday Night Contender Series 15
- Promotion: DWCS
- Date: July 31, 2018
- Venue: UFC Training Centre
- City: Las Vegas, Nevada, United States

Main Card
Weight class				Method	Round	Time	Notes
Lightweight	Roosevelt Roberts	def.	Garrett Gross	Submission (rear-naked choke)	2	2:13
Heavyweight	Don'Tale Mayes	def.	Mitchell Sipe	TKO (punches)	2	4:49
Middleweight	Ian Heinisch	def.	Justin Sumter	KO (elbows)	1	3:37
Featherweight	Jordan Griffin	def.	Maurice Mitchell	Submission (rear-naked choke)	1	3:57
Heavyweight	Juan Adams	def.	Shawn Teed	TKO (punches)	1	4:17

=== Contract awards ===
The following fighters were awarded contracts with the UFC:

- Roosevelt Roberts, Ian Heinisch, Jordan Griffin, and Juan Adams

== Week 8 - August 7 ==
Dana White's Tuesday Night Contender Series 16
- Promotion: DWCS
- Date: August 7, 2018
- Venue: UFC Training Centre
- City: Las Vegas, Nevada, United States

Main Card
Weight class				Method	Round	Time	Notes
Heavyweight	Greg Hardy	def.	Tebaris Gordon	TKO (punches)	1	0:17
Lightweight	Devonte Smith	def.	Joseph Lowry	KO (elbows)	1	2:52
Light Heavyweight	Kennedy Nzechukwu	def.	Dennis Bryant	TKO (head kick and punches)	1	1:48
Featherweight	Bobby Moffett	def.	Jacob Kilburn	Submission (brabo choke)	2	1:02
Featherweight	Alex Gilpin	def.	JR Coughran	Submission (brabo choke)	2	1:55

=== Contract awards ===
The following fighters were awarded contracts with the UFC:

- Devonte Smith, Kennedy Nzechukwu, and Bobby Moffett
