= Nassourdine Imavov =

French mixed martial artist (born 1995)

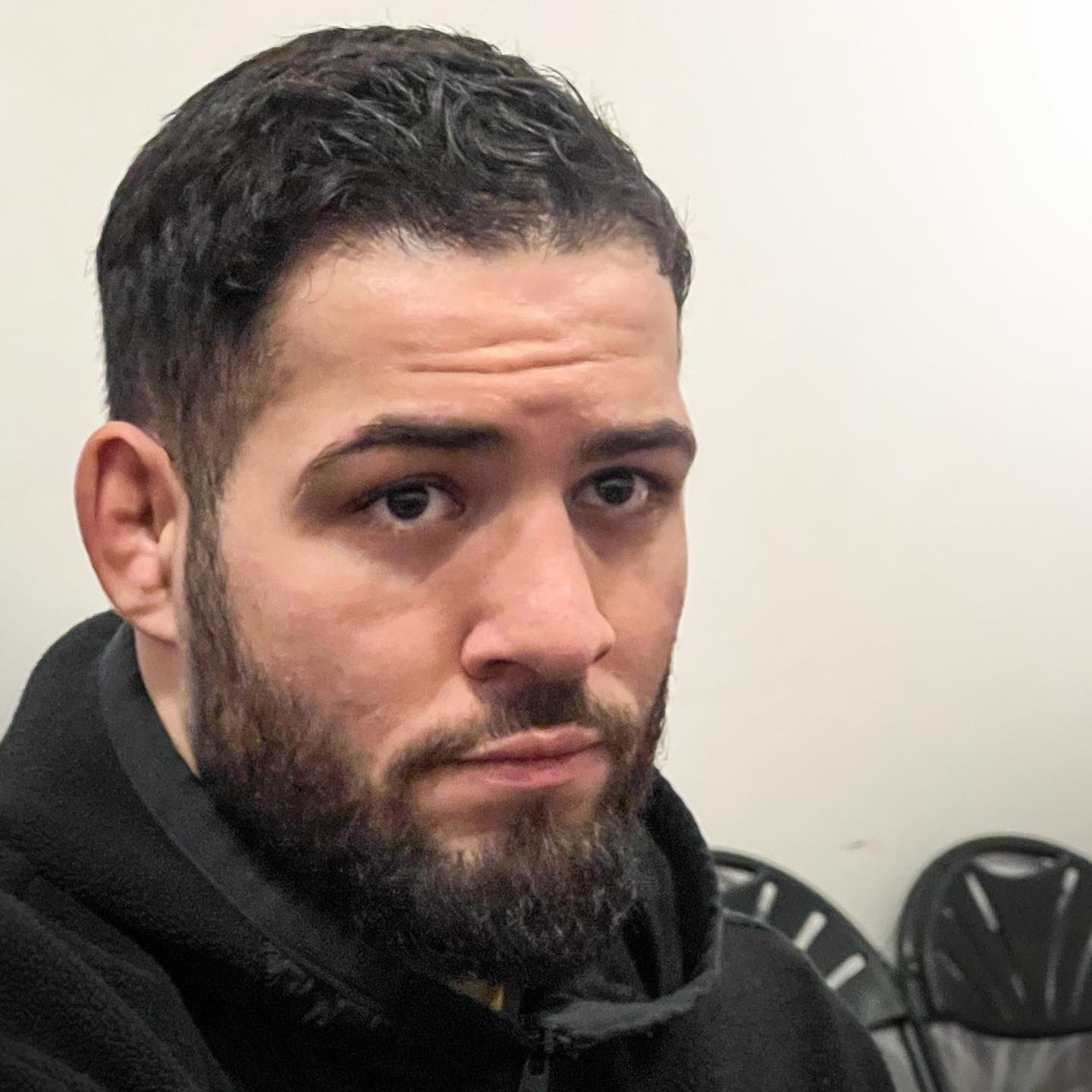
- Imavov in 2022
- Born: Nassourdine Abdoulazimovich Imavov; 1 March 1995 (age 31); Khasavyurt, Dagestan, Russia
- Other names: The Sniper
- Nationality: Russian; French
- Height: 6 ft 3 in (191 cm)
- Weight: 185 lb (84 kg; 13 st 3 lb)
- Division: Welterweight (2016–2019); Middleweight (2019–present); Light heavyweight (2023)
- Reach: 75 in (191 cm)
- Stance: Orthodox
- Fighting out of: Paris, France
- Team: MMA Factory (until 2023); Venum Training Camp
- Trainer: Fernand Lopez (until 2023); Nicolas Ott (2023–present)
- Years active: 2016–present

Mixed martial arts record
- Total: 22
- Wins: 17
- By knockout: 7
- By submission: 4
- By decision: 6
- Losses: 4
- By submission: 1
- By decision: 3
- No contests: 1

Other information
- Mixed martial arts record from Sherdog

Nassourdine Abdoulazimovich Imavov (Russian: Нассурдин Абдулазимович Имавов; born 1 March 1995) is a Russian-French professional mixed martial artist who currently competes in the Middleweight division of the Ultimate Fighting Championship (UFC). As of 12 May 2026, he is #3 in the Meta UFC middleweight rankings.

== Early life ==
Imavov was born to an ethnic Kumyk family in Khasavyurt, Dagestan, Russia. At the age of nine, Imavov moved with his family to Salon-de-Provence, France, where he started boxing. After that, he discovered MMA, and at 19, he moved to Paris with his older brother Daguir, where they joined Fernand Lopez's MMA Factory.

At the end of 2023, Imavov left MMA factory. He joined Venum Training Camp to train under Nicolas Ott.

== Mixed martial arts career ==
=== Early career ===
Starting his professional career in 2016, Imavov compiled an 8–2 record. He was riding a 5-bout win streak before signing with the UFC, during which time he picked up the Thunderstrike Fight League Welterweight Championship and a first-round beat down of former UFC welterweight Jonathan Meunier at ARES FC 1 on 14 December 2019.

=== Ultimate Fighting Championship ===
Imavov made his UFC debut against Jordan Williams on 4 October 2020, at UFC on ESPN 16. He won the bout via unanimous decision.

Imavov faced Phil Hawes at UFC Fight Night 185 on 20 February 2021. Despite a late storm by Imavov, he lost the bout via majority decision.

Imavov faced Ian Heinisch on 24 July 2021, at UFC on ESPN 27. He won the fight via technical knockout in round two.

Imavov faced Edmen Shahbazyan on 6 November 2021, at UFC 268. He won the fight via TKO due to elbows from crucifix position in round two.

Imavov was scheduled to face Kelvin Gastelum on 9 April 2022, at UFC 273. However, Imavov was forced to withdraw due to visa issues and the bout was cancelled.

Imavov faced Joaquin Buckley on 3 September 2022, at UFC Fight Night 209. He won the fight via unanimous decision.

Imavov was scheduled to face Kelvin Gastelum on 14 January 2023, at UFC Fight Night 217. However, Gastelum was forced to withdraw due to a mouth injury, and was replaced by Sean Strickland, with the bout taking place at light heavyweight. He lost the fight via unanimous decision.

Imavov faced Chris Curtis on 10 June 2023, at UFC 289. The bout ended in a no contest in the second round after an accidental clash of heads left Curtis unable to continue due to a severe cut above his eye.

Imavov was scheduled to face Ikram Aliskerov on 21 October 2023, at UFC 294. However, Imavov withdrew due to visa issues and was replaced by Warlley Alves.

Imavov faced Roman Dolidze on 3 February 2024, at UFC Fight Night 235 in the main event. Imavov won the bout by majority decision.

Imavov faced Jared Cannonier on 8 June 2024, at UFC on ESPN 57. He won the fight by technical knockout in the fourth round.

Imavov faced Brendan Allen on 28 September 2024 at UFC Fight Night 243. He won the fight by unanimous decision.

Imavov faced former two-time UFC Middleweight Champion Israel Adesanya in the main event on 1 February 2025 at UFC Fight Night 250. He won the fight by technical knockout in the second round. This fight earned him his first Performance of the Night award.

Imavov faced Caio Borralho in the main event on 6 September 2025 at UFC Fight Night 258. He won the fight by unanimous decision.

== Fighting style ==
Imavov is a 6-foot-3 striker known for his boxing skills. He has a versatile style mixing strong striking with grappling. He is a tall, athletic striker who excels at a steady pace from a distance. However, he can also be a strong offensive wrestler with top control and the ability to dominate opponents against the cage. He utilizes a side-on, bouncy stance. Rather than managing distance with kicks, Imavov uses his footwork to spring forward with fast punches, especially his jab. He keeps his lead hand extended to make his jab a quicker, more dangerous strike. He also uses feints and speed to set up hard combinations like the one-two or hook-cross. He is comfortable closing distance behind his right hand and is dangerous in the clinch, where he can land hard knees. He also excels at securing head position to defend against wrestling before breaking away with an elbow.

== Championships and accomplishments ==
=== Mixed martial arts ===
- Ultimate Fighting Championship
  - Performance of the Night (One time) vs. Israel Adesanya
- MMA Mania
  - 2025 Fighter of the Year - Honorable Mention
- Fight Exclusive Night
  - Fight of the Night (One time) vs. Michał Michalski
- Thunderstrike Fight League
  - TFL Welterweight Championship (One time; former)

== Mixed martial arts record ==
Professional record breakdown
22 matches	17 wins	4 losses
By knockout	7	0
By submission	4	1
By decision	6	3
No contests	1	

Res.	Record	Opponent	Method	Event	Date	Round	Time	Location	Notes
Win	17–4 (1)	Caio Borralho	Decision (unanimous)	UFC Fight Night: Imavov vs. Borralho	6 September 2025	5	5:00	Paris, France	
Win	16–4 (1)	Israel Adesanya	TKO (punches)	UFC Fight Night: Adesanya vs. Imavov	1 February 2025	2	0:30	Riyadh, Saudi Arabia	Performance of the Night.
Win	15–4 (1)	Brendan Allen	Decision (unanimous)	UFC Fight Night: Moicano vs. Saint Denis	28 September 2024	3	5:00	Paris, France	
Win	14–4 (1)	Jared Cannonier	TKO (punches)	UFC on ESPN: Cannonier vs. Imavov	8 June 2024	4	1:34	Louisville, Kentucky, United States	
Win	13–4 (1)	Roman Dolidze	Decision (majority)	UFC Fight Night: Dolidze vs. Imavov	3 February 2024	5	5:00	Las Vegas, Nevada, United States	Imavov was deducted one point in round 4 due to an illegal soccer kick.
NC	12–4 (1)	Chris Curtis	NC (accidental clash of heads)	UFC 289	10 June 2023	2	3:04	Vancouver, British Columbia, Canada	Return to Middleweight. Accidental clash of heads rendered Curtis unable to continue.
Loss	12–4	Sean Strickland	Decision (unanimous)	UFC Fight Night: Strickland vs. Imavov	14 January 2023	5	5:00	Las Vegas, Nevada, United States	Light Heavyweight debut.
Win	12–3	Joaquin Buckley	Decision (unanimous)	UFC Fight Night: Gane vs. Tuivasa	3 September 2022	3	5:00	Paris, France	
Win	11–3	Edmen Shahbazyan	TKO (elbows)	UFC 268	6 November 2021	2	4:42	New York City, New York, United States	
Win	10–3	Ian Heinisch	TKO (knee and punches)	UFC on ESPN: Sandhagen vs. Dillashaw	24 July 2021	2	3:09	Las Vegas, Nevada, United States	
Loss	9–3	Phil Hawes	Decision (majority)	UFC Fight Night: Blaydes vs. Lewis	20 February 2021	3	5:00	Las Vegas, Nevada, United States	
Win	9–2	Jordan Williams	Decision (unanimous)	UFC on ESPN: Holm vs. Aldana	4 October 2020	3	5:00	Abu Dhabi, United Arab Emirates	Return to Middleweight.
Win	8–2	Jonathan Meunier	TKO (punches)	Ares FC 1	14 December 2019	1	4:27	Dakar, Senegal	Catchweight (176 lb) bout.
Win	7–2	Mateusz Głuch	Submission (kimura)	Thunderstrike Fight League 18	September 28, 2019	1	N/A	Kozienice, Poland	Won the TFL Welterweight Championship.
Win	6–2	Francesco Demontis	Submission (rear-naked choke)	La Gabbia del Diavolo	July 26, 2019	1	2:26	Quartu Sant'Elena, Italy	Middleweight debut.
Win	5–2	Gregor Weibel	Decision (unanimous)	City Cage MMA 1	May 17, 2019	3	5:00	Luzern, Switzerland	
Win	4–2	Gary Formosa	TKO (punches)	Centurion Fight Championship 2	November 4, 2017	1	2:02	Paola, Malta	
Loss	3–2	Michał Michalski	Decision (unanimous)	Fight Exclusive Night 19	October 14, 2017	3	5:00	Wrocław, Poland	Fight of the Night.
Win	3–1	Paul Lawrence	TKO (punches)	Centurion Fight Championship 1	May 13, 2017	1	2:43	Paola, Malta	
Win	2–1	Yanis Cheufre	Submission (brabo choke)	Fight Night One 4	April 8, 2016	1	2:32	Saint Étienne, France	
Win	1–1	Said Magomed Tachaev	Submission (rear-naked choke)	Gladiator Fighting Arena 3	March 5, 2016	1	3:20	Nîmes, France	
Loss	0–1	Ayadi Majdeddine	Submission (guillotine choke)	100% Fight 27	February 4, 2016	1	4:49	Paris, France	Welterweight debut.

== Kickboxing record ==
Professional Kickboxing record
Date	Result	Opponent	Event	Location	Method	Round	Time
2019-04-06	Loss	(France) René Dione	La Nuit Des Combattants 9	Persan, France	Decision	3	3:00
Legend: Win Loss Draw/No contest Notes

== See also ==
- List of current UFC fighters
- List of male mixed martial artists
