= UFC Fight Night: Maia vs. Askren =

UFC mixed martial arts event in 2019

- The poster for UFC Fight Night: Maia vs. Askren
- Promotion: Ultimate Fighting Championship
- Date: October 26, 2019
- Venue: Singapore Indoor Stadium
- City: Kallang, Singapore
- Attendance: 7,155

Event chronology
UFC on ESPN: Reyes vs. Weidman	UFC Fight Night: Maia vs. Askren	UFC 244: Masvidal vs Diaz

UFC Fight Night: Maia vs. Askren (also known as UFC Fight Night 162 or UFC on ESPN+ 20) was a mixed martial arts event produced by the Ultimate Fighting Championship that took place on October 26, 2019 at the Singapore Indoor Stadium in Kallang, Singapore.

== Background ==
A welterweight bout between former UFC Welterweight and Middleweight Championship challenger Demian Maia and former Bellator Welterweight Champion and former ONE Welterweight Champion, Ben Askren headlined the event.

A heavyweight bout between Greg Hardy and Jarjis Danho was scheduled for the event. However, Danho was pulled from the event for an undisclosed reason. He was replaced by Ben Sosoli on September 19 and the bout moved to UFC on ESPN: Reyes vs. Weidman a week earlier.

Yan Xiaonan was scheduled to face Ashley Yoder at the event. However, Yan pulled out of the fight in late-September citing a foot injury. She was replaced by Randa Markos.

Ian Heinisch was scheduled to face Brad Tavares at the event. However, Heinisch was removed from the pairing in early October for undisclosed reasons. In turn, Tavares was removed from the event entirely and rescheduled to face Edmen Shahbazyan a week later at UFC 244.

Karol Rosa was scheduled to face Julia Avila at the event. However, Rosa pulled out of the fight in mid-October citing a knee injury and the bout was scrapped.

== Results ==
Main Card (ESPN+)
Weight class				Method	Round	Time	Notes
Welterweight	Demian Maia	def.	Ben Askren	Technical Submission (rear-naked choke)	3	3:54
Lightweight	Stevie Ray	def.	Michael Johnson	Decision (majority) (29–28, 29–28, 28–28)	3	5:00
Lightweight	Beneil Dariush	def.	Frank Camacho	Submission (rear-naked choke)	1	2:02
Heavyweight	Ciryl Gane	def.	Don'Tale Mayes	Submission (heel hook)	3	4:46
Welterweight	Muslim Salikhov	def.	Laureano Staropoli	Decision (unanimous) (30–26, 30–26, 29–28)	3	5:00
Preliminary Card (ESPN+)
Women's Strawweight	Randa Markos	def.	Ashley Yoder	Decision (split) (29–28, 28–29, 29–28)	3	5:00
Lightweight	Rafael Fiziev	def.	Alex White	Decision (unanimous) (29–28, 30–27, 30–27)	3	5:00
Featherweight	Movsar Evloev	def.	Enrique Barzola	Decision (unanimous) (29–28, 29–28, 30–27)	3	5:00
Heavyweight	Sergei Pavlovich	def.	Maurice Greene	TKO (punches)	1	2:11
Women's Strawweight	Loma Lookboonmee	def.	Aleksandra Albu	Decision (split) (30–27, 28–29, 30–27)	3	5:00
Heavyweight	Raphael Pessoa	def.	Jeff Hughes	Decision (unanimous) (30–27, 30–27, 30–27)	3	5:00

== Bonus awards ==
The following fighters received $50,000 bonuses.

- Fight of the Night: Demian Maia vs. Ben Askren
- Performance of the Night: Beneil Dariush and Ciryl Gane

== See also ==
- List of UFC events
- 2019 in UFC
- List of current UFC fighters
