= Juan Espino =

Spanish mixed martial arts fighter

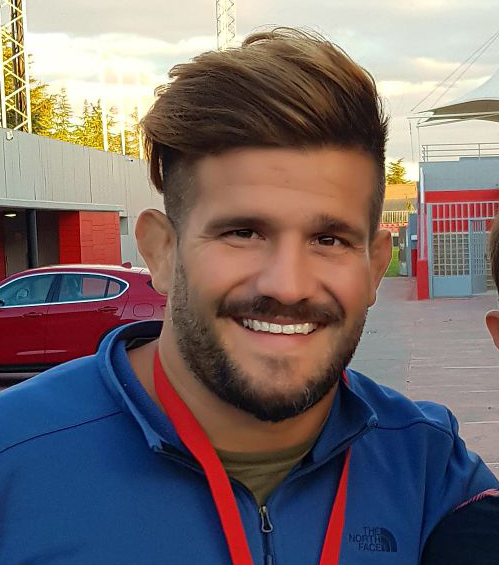
- Born: 9 October 1980 (age 46); Las Palmas, Canary Islands, Spain
- Other names: El Guapo
- Height: 6 ft 3 in (1.91 m)
- Weight: 255 lb (116 kg; 18 st 3 lb)
- Division: Heavyweight
- Reach: 80 in (203 cm)
- Style: Submission grappling Brazilian jiu-jitsu
- Fighting out of: Las Palmas, Canary Islands, Spain
- Team: American Top Team
- Rank: Black belt in Brazilian jiu-jitsu
- Years active: 2009–2023

Mixed martial arts record
- Total: 12
- Wins: 10
- By knockout: 1
- By submission: 7
- By decision: 2
- Losses: 2
- By knockout: 1
- By decision: 1

Other information
- Mixed martial arts record from Sherdog

Juan Francisco Espino Dieppa (born 9 October 1980) is a Spanish retired mixed martial artist and submission grappler who competed in the heavyweight division of the Ultimate Fighting Championship. In submission grappling, he was a 11-time world and European champion under UWW rules, in the no-gi and gi categories.

== Grappling ==
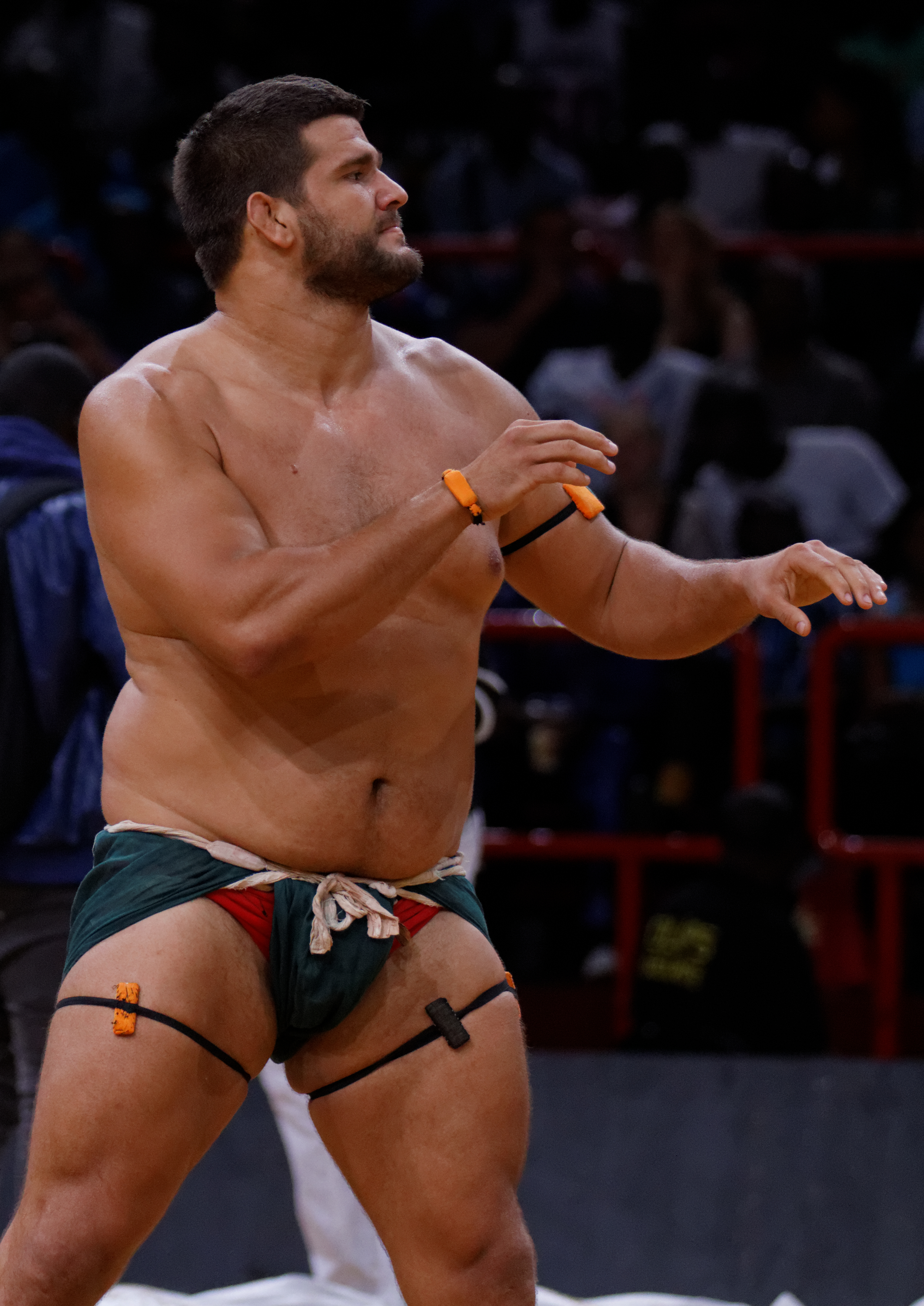
World African Wrestling world tour, Paris Bercy

Juan Espino started in Canarian wrestling where he reached the level of puntal A, the highest grade in this sport, as well as several individual and collective titles In grappling, he won the gold medal (in the absolute category) at the 2011 World Championship held in Belgrade (Serbia), after defeating the American Kelly Anundson in the final. He conquered the gold and silver medal in gi and no-gi, respectively, at the 2012 World Championship, held in Krakow (Poland). Gold medals in both grappling modalities at the 2013 World Championship, held in London (Canada) where he also won gold in Mixed Martial Arts and Brazilian Jiu-Jitsu. The following year he won the gold medal (in grappling without gi) and the bronze medal (in grappling with gi) at the World Championships held in Moscow. He also won a gold medal at the 2016 World Grappling Championships held in Minsk (Belarus), where he also won the bronze medal in grappling no-gi, in the over 100 kg category.

In the European Championships, he won gold medal in Brussels (Belgium), in 2012. The following year in Kecskemét (Hungary), both in grappling gi and no-gi, and in Sassari (Italy), in 2015, where he also got the double. He has obtained numerous victories in different variants of wrestling: champion of Spain (Gijón), in 2012 and 2013, in a Sambo modality. He was also European champion (León), in 2010, in Celtic Wrestling. In 2010 he was European champion in Lucha Gouren, in the championship held in Brittany, France. In Lucha Leonesa, he was the winner of the First European Wrestling Championship, and in the specialty of Tatar wrestling he was proclaimed European champion in 2013, in Mamaia (Romania).

In 2022, Espino competed at a team submission grappling event in Gran Canaria and drew criticism for his disqualification from the event after an eye-poke to his final opponent.

=== Lucha Laamb (Senegalese) ===
His expertise in Lamb or Senegalese wrestling, where he has a record of 7 wins and 0 losses, inspired a Robinson Report - "A white lion in Senegal" -, made him the only foreigner and white recognized by the National Federation of Senegal (C.N.G.L.) and earned him the nickname of the "White Lion".

=== Gouren ===
In 2010, Espino won the Bretrona Gouren European Wrestling Championship held in Brittany, France.

=== Leon Wrestling ===
In 2011, he was champion of the First European Leonese Wrestling Championship that took place in Leon (Spain).

=== Kabaddi ===
In 2013 he participated in the Kabaddi World Cup, included in the Spanish National Team, which attended for the first time a championship of this sport originating in India.

== Mixed martial arts career ==
=== Amateur MMA ===
In Mixed Martial Arts, Juan Espino holds a 17–0 record in the amateur category, having been proclaimed Champion of Spain, organized by FILA, in Gijón., European Row Champion in Hungary and World Row Champion in Canada. All these results were achieved in 2013. He also won the Spanish championship in 2014 and 2015.

Juan's career in Mixed Martial Arts begins with his first professional fight in 2009 against the Egyptian El Alfy Amr, in the Furious Fighting Championship 2, in Casablanca. He wins by submission with a kimura key 35 seconds into the fight. He fought again in 2010 by beating the Romanian Ionut Simionescu, in the first round. The fight took place at the Jet Challenge event, in the Canary Islands, with referee Alexis Santana. He won with a guillotine choke. His only defeat took place in 2011 against Russian Vitali Minakov, in Moscow.

In 2013, Juan went to train with the American Top Team, in Miami. One of the most important mixed martial arts gyms worldwide, where current and former UFC, PRIDE, K-1, Bellator, DREAM and Strikeforce champions are trained. Some prominent names, among many others, can be Tyron Woodley, Amanda Nunes, Junior Dos Santos, Alexey Oleynik, Thiago Alves or Will Brooks.

From here comes a series of six fights in which Juan has always beaten his opponents, starting with Dutchman Jimmy van Bemmelen, at the AFL 11 event in the Canary Islands. He next fought at Cotas MMA 3 fight in Bolivia against American Rodney Wallace, winning by unanimous decision. He returned to the Canary Islands, for the Lanzarote Arena 2 - MMA event, to finish with a technical knockout of Englishman Stanlee Wilson in the first round. Less than a month later, he gets back in the cage against Albanian Dritan Barjamaj at the WTE Fight Championship - MMA & Muay Thai event, on 14 July 2017, winning by submission in 1:39 minutes. On 23 September 2017, he goes to Barcelona, to the event "Arnold Fighters / Titan Channel - War of Titans", to prevail by mataleon against Ukrainian Yuri Gorbenko. His last fight took place in October 2017 at the FECALUMA - MMA-K-1-BJJ event, in the Canary Islands, against Slovak Martin Buday. He won by unanimous decision.

=== The Ultimate Fighter ===
In August 2017, it was announced that Juan was one of the fighters featured on The Ultimate Fighter: Heavy Hitters UFC TV series.

Espino was the third pick by coach Robert Whittaker. In the quarter-finals, Espino defeated Ben Sosoli via unanimous decision in two rounds. In the semi-finals, Espino defeated Maurice Greene via submission (rear naked choke) in Round 1. This win secured Espino a spot in the finals against Justin Frazier.

=== Ultimate Fighting Championship ===
Juan Espino made his UFC debut on 30 November 2018 at UFC, that event was known as "The Ultimate Fighter: Heavy Hitters Finale." He fought against Justin Frazier to determine the heavyweight winner of The Ultimate Fighter 28. "El guapo" won the fight with an armbar (armlock) in the first round of the fight. After this victory, he became the first Spaniard to win a fight in the UFC and was proclaimed winner of "The Ultimate Fighter 28: Heavy Hitters" along with Macy Chiasson (female winner). This performance earned Espino a Performance of the Night bonus.

However, Juan would suffer a hand injury that would keep him out of the octagon for two years. This was due to the fact that Juan had to undergo surgery 3 times to fully recover from the injury.

Espino faced Jeff Hughes on 27 September 2020 at UFC 253. He won the fight via submission in round one.

Espino faced Alexander Romanov on 17 April 2021 at UFC on ESPN: Whittaker vs. Gastelum. During the beginning of the third round, Espino accidentally connected with a knee to the groin of Romanov, who could not continue. Romanov was declared the winner via technical split decision. 6 out of 8 media scores gave it to Espino, with the other two declaring it a Draw.

On April 21, 2023, Espino announced that due to injuries, he was retiring from MMA. On 23 March 2024 Espino fought Antônio Silva in an exhibition match at La Despedida, in the Gran Canaria Arena in Las Palmas on the Canary Islands. The bout ended in a draw.

== Championships and accomplishments ==
=== Grappling ===
World Championship Grappling
Year	Location	Medals	Category
2011	Belgrade (Serbia)	Gold	Grappling Absolute
2012	Kraków (Poland)	Gold	Grappling Gi +100 kg
2012	Kraków (Poland)	Silver	Grappling No-Gi +100 kg
2013	London (Canada)	Gold	Grappling Gi +100 kg
2013	London (Canada)	Gold	Grappling No-Gi +100 kg
2014	Moscow (Russia)	Gold	Grappling No-Gi +100 kg
2014	Moscow (Russia)	Bronze	Grappling Gi +100 kg
2016	Minsk (Belarus)	Gold	Grappling Gi +100 kg
2016	Minsk (Belarus)	Bronze	Grappling No-Gi +100 kg
European Grappling Championship
Year	Location	Medals	Category
2012	Brussels (Belgium)	Gold	Grappling No-Gi +100 kg
2013	Kecskemet (Hungary)	Gold	Grappling Gi +100 kg
2013	Kecskemet (Hungary)	Gold	Grappling No-Gi +100 kg
2015	Sassari (Italy)	Gold	Grappling No-Gi +100 kg
2015	Sassari (Italy)	Gold	Grappling Gi +100 kg

=== Mixed martial arts ===
- Ultimate Fighting Championship
  - The Ultimate Fighter: Heavy Hitters Heavyweight winner.
  - Performance of the Night (One time) vs. Justin Frazier

== Mixed martial arts record ==
Professional record breakdown
12 matches	10 wins	2 losses
By knockout	1	1
By submission	7	0
By decision	2	1

Res.	Record	Opponent	Method	Event	Date	Round	Time	Location	Notes
Loss	10–2	Alexander Romanov	Technical Decision (split)	UFC on ESPN: Whittaker vs. Gastelum	April 17, 2021	3	1:05	Las Vegas, Nevada, United States	Accidental knee to the groin rendered Romanov unable to continue.
Win	10–1	Jeff Hughes	Submission (scarf hold choke)	UFC 253	September 27, 2020	1	3:48	Abu Dhabi, United Arab Emirates	
Win	9–1	Justin Frazier	Submission (straight armlock)	The Ultimate Fighter: Heavy Hitters Finale	November 30, 2018	1	3:36	Las Vegas, Nevada, United States	Won The Ultimate Fighter 28 Heavyweight Tournament. Performance of the Night.
Win	8–1	Martin Buday	Decision (unanimous)	FECALUMA: MMA-K1-BJJ	October 14, 2017	3	5:00	Santa Cruz de Tenerife, Spain	
Win	7–1	Yuri Gorbenko	Submission (rear-naked choke)	Titan Channel: War of Titans	September 23, 2017	1	2:27	Barcelona, Spain	
Win	6–1	Dritan Barjamaj	Submission (arm-triangle choke)	WTE Fight Championship 1	July 14, 2017	1	1:39	Santa Cruz de la Palma, Spain	
Win	5–1	Stanlee Wilson	TKO (punches)	Lanzarote Arena 2	July 8, 2017	1	1:42	Tías, Spain	
Win	4–1	Rodney Wallace	Decision (unanimous)	Combate Comas MMA 3	June 10, 2017	3	5:00	Santa Cruz, Bolivia	
Win	3–1	Jimmy van Bemmelen	Submission (rear-naked choke)	AFL 11	March 25, 2017	1	1:09	Las Palmas, Spain	
Loss	2–1	Vitaly Minakov	TKO (punches)	League S-70: Sambo 70 vs. Spain	April 21, 2011	1	0:09	Moscow, Russia	
Win	2–0	Ionut Simionescu	Submission (guillotine choke)	Jet Global Fitness Center: Jet Challenge	October 9, 2010	1	4:07	Las Palmas, Spain	
Win	1–0	El Alfy Amr	Submission (kimura)	Furious Fighting Championship 2	February 21, 2009	1	0:35	Casablanca, Morocco	

=== Mixed martial arts exhibition record ===
Exhibition record breakdown		
2 matches	2 wins	0 losses
By submission	1	0
By decision	1	0

Res.	Record	Opponent	Method	Event	Date	Round	Time	Location	Notes
Win	2–0	Maurice Greene	Submission (rear-naked choke)	The Ultimate Fighter: Heavy Hitters	November 21, 2018 (airdate)	1	1:55	Las Vegas, Nevada, United States	The Ultimate Fighter 28 semi-final round.
Win	1–0	Ben Sosoli	Decision (unanimous)	The Ultimate Fighter: Heavy Hitters	October 24, 2018 (airdate)	2	5:00	Las Vegas, Nevada, United States	The Ultimate Fighter 28 quarter-final round.

== See also ==
- List of male mixed martial artists
