= MMA Factory =

Mixed martial arts gym in Paris, France

- Est.: 2013; 13 years ago
- Founded by: Fernand Lopez
- Primary trainers: Fernand Lopez
- Past titleholders: Francis Ngannou; Ciryl Gane
- Training facilities: Boulevard Poniatowski, Paris, France
- Website: mma-factory.fr

MMA Factory is a mixed martial arts gym based in Paris, France. It is considered the largest MMA gym in France, and is notable for producing former UFC Heavyweight Champion, Francis Ngannou and current UFC Heavyweight Champion, Ciryl Gane.

== Overview ==
In 2013, Fernand Lopez and his business partner, a police officer, opened CrossFight in the 12th arrondissement of Paris. Soon after, he renamed the gym 'MMA Factory.' The gym started with only two fighters but rapidly expanded to have over 600 students and 18 staff members as of 2018.

MMA Factory was sponsored by Reebok France.

The most notable fighter produced by MMA Factory is Francis Ngannou who would become UFC Heavyweight Champion in 2021. When Ngannou was 26, he moved from Cameroon to France in order pursue his dream of becoming a professional boxer. Francis Carmont met Ngannou and then introduced him to Lopez and the MMA factory. Lopez saw the potential of Ngannou and convinced him to try MMA even though Ngannou originally wanted to do boxing. Lopez gave Ngannou some MMA gear and allowed him to train and sleep at the gym for no cost thus starting his MMA career. However the relationship between Lopez and Ngannou has deteriorated in recent years with Lopez citing that Ngannou has ego problems and had refused to pay gym membership fees after he had achieved success. As a result, Ngannou moved to the United States to train at Xtreme Couture.

MMA factory has also produced Ciryl Gane. Gane won the Interim UFC Heavyweight Championship after defeating Derrick Lewis on 7 August 2021, at UFC 265.

Gane faced Francis Ngannou for the UFC Heavyweight Championship on 22 January 2022, at UFC 270. He lost the fight via unanimous decision.

== Notable people ==
=== Mixed martial artists ===
==== UFC ====
- Francis Ngannou (Former UFC Heavyweight Champion)
- Ciryl Gane (Current UFC Heavyweight Champion)
- Ion Cuțelaba
- Veronica Macedo
- Taylor Lapilus
- Nassourdine Imavov
- Alan Baudot

==== Others ====
- Jérôme Le Banner
- Sokoudjou
- Christian M'Pumbu
- Rizlen Zouak
- Cédric Doumbé

== See also ==
- List of professional MMA training camps
