= Fernand Lopez =

French Cameroonian mixed martial arts (MMA) fighter and coach

Fernand Lopez Owonyebe
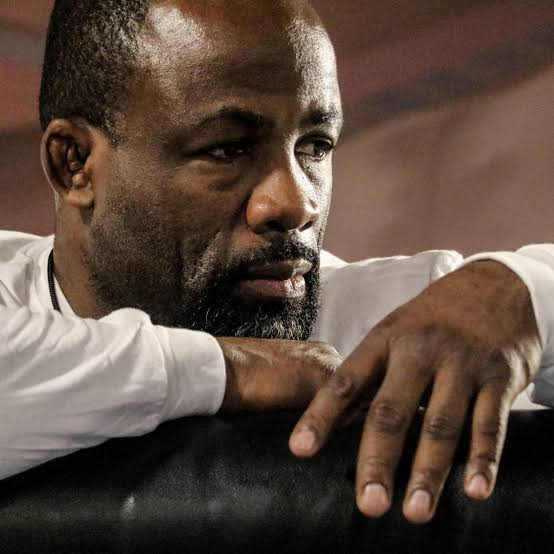
- Fernand Lopez in training
- Born: 12 November 1978 (age 47); Lekié, Cameroon
- Nationality: Cameroonian, French
- Height: 5 ft 9 in (175 cm)
- Weight: 185 lb (84 kg; 13.2 st)
- Division: Middleweight
- Team: MMA Factory (2013–present); Free Fight Academy (2005–2013)

Mixed martial arts record
- Total: 17
- Wins: 10
- By knockout: 4
- By submission: 3
- By decision: 3
- Losses: 7
- By knockout: 6
- By submission: 1

Other information
- University: INSEP; Université de Bourgogne UFR STAPS
- Notable school: Lycée General Leclerc
- Website: www.fernandlopez.com
- Mixed martial arts record from Sherdog

Fernand Lopez Owonyebe (born 12 November 1978) is a French former mixed martial artist (MMA) and current MMA coach. He is best known for having co-founded MMA Factory, the biggest MMA gym in France, as well as being the former trainer of former UFC Heavyweight Champion Francis Ngannou and current trainer of the current UFC Heavyweight Champion Ciryl Gane. Since 2019, he has been director of the ARES Fighting Championship.

== Background ==
Lopez was born in 1978 in a small village in Lekié and grew up in Yaoundé. His father was a college professor and his mother was a high school teacher.

In his youth his father signed him up for lessons in combat sports such as Taekwondo, Boxing, Judo and Wrestling to defend himself from bullies.

In 1997, Lopez immigrated to France where he worked as an Electrical Engineer. On the side he would attend sports science classes at INSEP while playing rugby in the Pro D2 league. However a neck injury sidelined him in rugby and he had to have surgery to treat it, rendering him unable to move his neck for three years. During this period, Lopez discovered Brazilian Jiu-Jitsu (BJJ) leading him to gain an interest in mixed martial arts.

After retiring as a professional fighter, Lopez became an MMA coach at Free Fight Academy for a few years before deciding to establish his own gym. In 2013 Lopez and his business partner, a police officer, opened a gym called 'Cross Fight' which was later renamed 'MMA Factory'.

=== Mixed martial arts career ===
Lopez joined Mathieu Nicourt's Free Fight Academy where he initially trained in BJJ. Once his neck recovered, he resumed training in other combat sports like Wrestling and Boxing.

On 11 March 2006, Lopez made his professional MMA debut after a year of training. The bout took place at Xtreme Gladiators 2 where he submitted Cedric Deschamps via choke in the first round.

Lopez's professional MMA career lasted for four years from 2006 to 2010. He fought in various promotions such as M1 Global and Shooto, where his final record was ten wins and seven losses.

=== Coaching career ===
He is Sports Director, and manages the MMA Factory with Benjamin Sarfati as president. Together they create an ecosystem that allows them to push their fighters to the most prestigious organizations including the Ultimate Fighting Championship.

Initially this academy had two students, but grew very fast to become the biggest gym in France with over 600 students. MMA Factory was one of only three gyms to receive sponsorship from Reebok, with the other two being AKA and SBG.

His most notable student was Francis Ngannou, who became the UFC Heavyweight Champion in 2021 after defeating Stipe Miocic in a rematch at UFC 260 where Fernand trained Ngannou with no cost and allowed him sleep at the gym at no cost when Ngannou started training in Lopez's gym. The relationship between Lopez and Ngannou has deteriorated after that, with Lopez stating that Ngannou has ego problems and had refused to pay gym membership fees after he had achieved success. Ngannou moved to the United States to train at Xtreme Couture.

==== Notable fighters trained ====
- Francis Ngannou - former UFC Heavyweight Champion
- Ciryl Gane - current UFC Heavyweight Champion
- Ion Cuțelaba
- Taylor Lapilus
- Christian M'Pumbu
- Nassourdine Imavov
- Jérôme Le Banner
- Cédric Doumbé

== Personal life ==
Fernand Lopez has been married to Charlotte Dipanda since April 15, 2023.

The book Training Camp: “MMA, in the secrets of the battle of the titans Gane VS Ngannou”, published in March 2023, is co-written by Lopez and Geoffrey Le Guilcher. This work relates the journey and the clash of Lopez's two champions: Gane and Ngannou for the title of world heavyweight champion at UFC 270 in 2022. Lopez also addresses the technical details of the training camps.

Fernand Lopez obtained a degree in electrical engineering but very quickly became interested in sport. He graduated from the National Institute of Sport in sports performance and physical preparation and State Diplomas in four combat disciplines where he is one of the external speakers as part of training at INSEP.

Fernand Lopez the “Management Factory”, an athlete career management agency, Fight Management College, a training school specializing in the supervision of combat sports.

== Controversies ==
Cédric Doumbé leveled accusations of domestic violence against Fernand Lopez following his victory at PFL Europe 3. He claimed to have witnessed an incident while on the phone with Lopez's ex-partner. Several statements and revelations were made by the key individuals on social media during this period. Fernand Lopez acknowledged engaging in violent behavior towards his ex-girlfriend, offering apologies.

== Mixed martial arts record ==
Professional record breakdown
17 matches	10 wins	7 losses
By knockout	4	6
By submission	3	1
By decision	3	0

Res.	Record	Opponent	Method	Event	Date	Round	Time	Location	Notes
Win	10–7	Matteo Piran	TKO (punches)	ADFC - Round 2	22 October 2010	1	4:20	Abu Dhabi, United Arab Emirates	
Loss	9–7	Patrick Vallee	KO (front kick)	100% Fight - VIP	19 June 2010	2	2:53	Aubervilliers, France	
Win	9–6	Eric Cebarec	Decision (unanimous)	100% Fight - VIP	19 June 2010	2	5:00	Aubervilliers, France	
Win	8–6	Christophe Daffreville	Decision (unanimous)	PFC 2 - Pancrase Fighting Championship 2	17 April 2010	3	5:00	Marseille, Bouches-du-Rhône, France	
Loss	7–6	Patrick Vallee	KO (head kick)	100% Fight - 100 Percent Fight 2	13 March 2010	1	0:40	Paris, France	
Loss	7–5	Danijel Dzebic	Submission (heel hook)	M-1 Selection 2010: Western Europe Round 1	5 February 2010	1	0:59	Hilversum, North Holland, Netherlands	
Win	7–4	Nicolas M'Bog	Decision (unanimous)	PFC - Challengers 1	6 December 2009	2	5:00	Marseille, Bouches-du-Rhône, France	
Win	6–4	Karim Mammar	TKO (punches)	Shooto - Belgium	27 June 2009	1	0:12	Charleroi, Wallonia, Belgium	
Win	5–4	Cedric Severac	Submission (rear-naked choke)	PMKE - Pro MMA Kempo Elite	6 June 2009	2	2:58	Lyon, France	
Loss	4–4	Igor Araujo	KO (knee)	Yamabushi - Combat Sport Night 5	2 May 2009	2	1:29	Geneva, Switzerland	
Win	4–3	Wojciech Jamrozik	TKO	PK - Pro Kumite	21 February 2009	1	1:03	Swindon, Wiltshire, England	
Loss	3–3	Vasily Krilov	TKO (punches)	M-1 MFC: Fedor Emelianenko Cup	15 May 2008	1	N/A	Russia	
Loss	3–2	Kamil Uygun	TKO (punches)	M-1: Slamm	2 March 2008	1	N/A	Almere, Flevoland, Netherlands.	
Win	3–1	Delivrance Nsomboli	Submission	MYT - Mix-fight Yveslines Tournament	8 December 2007	N/A	N/A	France	
Loss	2–1	Aziz Karaoglu	TKO	OC - Masters Fight Night 6	11 November 2006	2	N/A	Wuppertal, Germany	
Win	2–0	Ali Yilmaz	TKO	OC 5 - Outsider Cup 5	13 May 2006	1	2:31	Duisburg, Germany	
Win	1–0	Cedric Deshamps	Submission (choke)	XG 2 - Xtreme Gladiators 2	11 March 2006	1	N/A	Paris, France	
