= UFC 253 =

UFC mixed martial arts event in 2020

UFC 253: Adesanya vs. Costa
- The poster for UFC 253: Adesanya vs. Costa
- Promotion: Ultimate Fighting Championship
- Date: September 27, 2020
- Venue: du Forum
- City: Abu Dhabi, United Arab Emirates
- Attendance: None (behind closed doors)
- Buyrate: 700,000

Event chronology
| UFC Fight Night: Covington vs. Woodley | UFC 253: Adesanya vs. Costa | UFC on ESPN: Holm vs. Aldana |

UFC 253: Adesanya vs. Costa was a mixed martial arts event produced by the Ultimate Fighting Championship that took place on September 27, 2020 at the du Forum on Yas Island, Abu Dhabi, United Arab Emirates.

== Background ==
The event was originally expected to take place on September 19, but it was moved to September 27. UFC Fight Night: Covington vs. Woodley took place on the former date.

Although not officially announced by the organization, a UFC Lightweight Championship unification bout between current champion Khabib Nurmagomedov and interim champion Justin Gaethje (also former WSOF Lightweight Champion) was briefly linked to the event. However, the date did not materialize and their manager, Ali Abdelaziz, indicated that his clients would still face each other before the end of the year. The pairing was then scheduled for UFC 254.

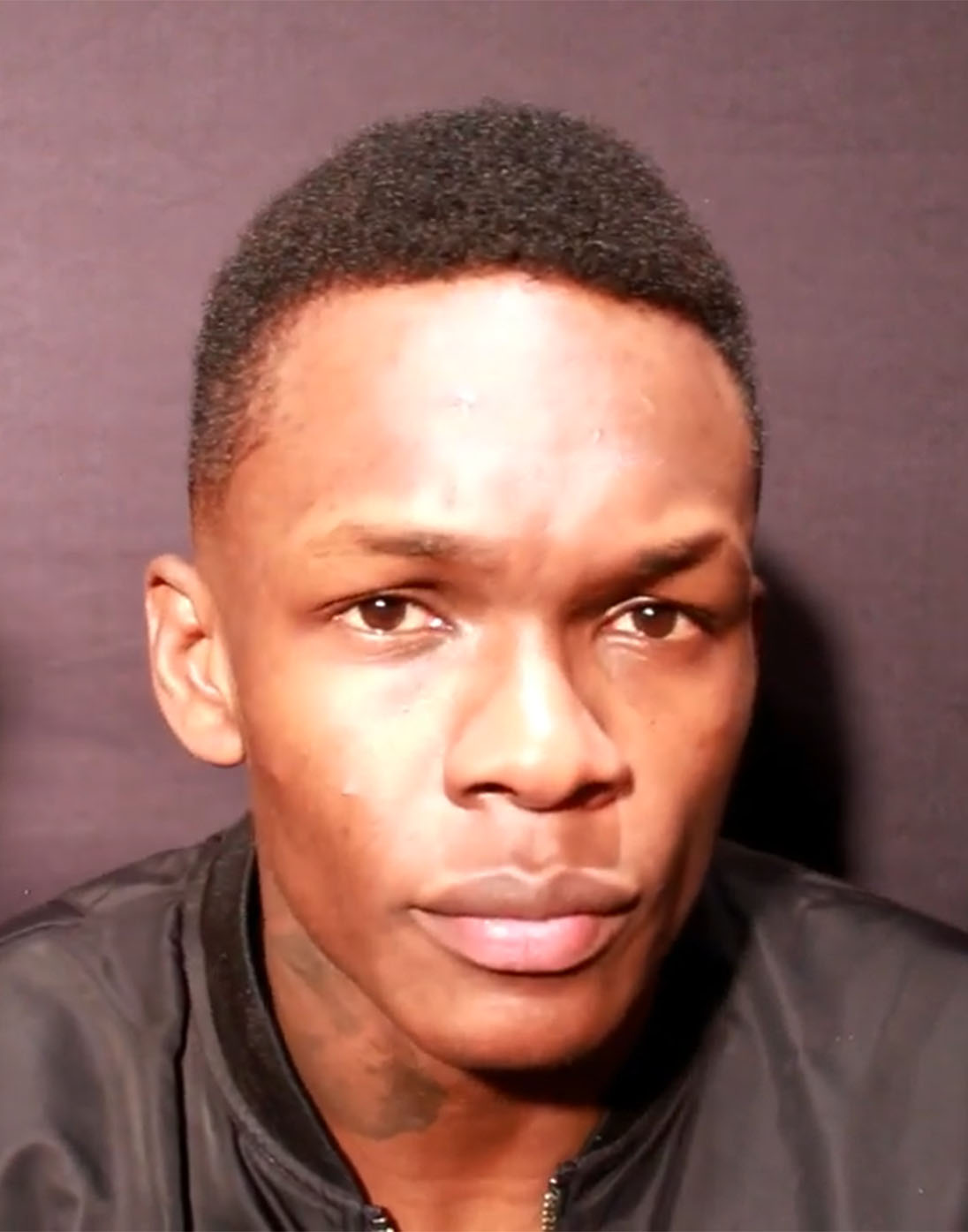
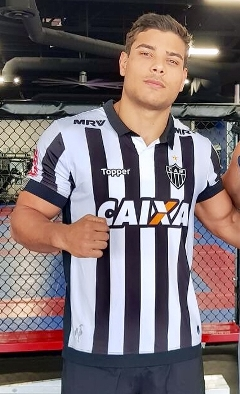
With both Adesanya (left) and Costa (right) having no losses on their records (19–0 and 13–0, respectively), this bout represented just the second time in UFC history that two undefeated male athletes had met for a title. The only previous occasion was for the UFC Light Heavyweight Championship over a decade ago, between former champions Rashad Evans and Lyoto Machida at UFC 98 in 2009.

Without fans in attendance, the promotion did not have to worry about the local timing of the event, so it proceeded with normal timing for prime time hours on the east coast of North America. The main card began at 6:00 am (September 27) local time in Abu Dhabi, with a full preliminary card beginning at approximately 2:30 am Gulf Standard Time.

A UFC Middleweight Championship bout between current champion Israel Adesanya and Paulo Costa served as the event headliner. The bout was originally targeted for UFC 248, but Costa was unable to compete on that card due to injury. In turn, Adesanya defended his title against former title challenger (as well as 2000 Olympic silver medalist and former world champion in freestyle wrestling) Yoel Romero.

A UFC Light Heavyweight Championship bout for the vacant title between former title challenger Dominick Reyes and former KSW Light Heavyweight Champion Jan Błachowicz served as the event's co-headliner. Former two-time champion Jon Jones vacated the belt on August 17, citing issues with the UFC over salary negotiation and the desire to compete at heavyweight.

A heavyweight bout between Ciryl Gane and Shamil Abdurakhimov was expected to take place at this event. The pairing was originally scheduled for UFC 249, but Gane was forced to pull out of the event after he was struck by a pneumothorax in training. Subsequently, the pairing was rescheduled for UFC 251 and cancelled a second time as Abdurakhimov was removed from the bout for undisclosed reasons. In late August, the bout was moved from this event to UFC Fight Night: Covington vs. Woodley a week earlier.

A strawweight bout between former UFC Women's Strawweight Championship challenger Cláudia Gadelha and Yan Xiaonan was expected to take place at this event, but a knee injury sustained by Gadelha ruled her out of the bout. The pairing was rescheduled for UFC on ESPN: Santos vs. Teixeira instead.

A flyweight bout between Jordan Espinosa and David Dvořák was expected to take place at this event, but was later rebooked for UFC Fight Night: Covington vs. Woodley due to undisclosed reasons.

A women's bantamweight bout between Marion Reneau and Ketlen Vieira was scheduled for the event. However, Reneau was pulled from the bout on September 16 citing an undisclosed injury and replaced by Sijara Eubanks.

Nate Landwehr was expected to face Shane Young in a featherweight bout at this event. However, Landwehr was pulled from the event after he tested positive for COVID-19 and replaced by promotional newcomer Ľudovít Klein.

A bantamweight bout between Casey Kenney and Heili Alateng was originally expected to take place at this event. However, it was moved to UFC on ESPN: Holm vs. Aldana a week later due to undisclosed reasons.

At the weigh-ins, Zubaira Tukhugov and Ľudovít Klein missed weight for their respective featherweight bouts. Both fighters weighed in at 150 pounds, four pounds over the non-title fight limit. Both of their bouts proceeded at a catchweight and they were each fined a percentage of their individual purses, which went to their opponents Hakeem Dawodu and Shane Young.

== Results ==
Main card
| Weight class | | | | Method | Round | Time | Notes |
|---|---|---|---|---|---|---|---|
| Middleweight | Israel Adesanya (c) | def. | Paulo Costa | TKO (punches) | 2 | 3:59 | (Note: For the UFC Middleweight Championship.) |
| Light Heavyweight | Jan Błachowicz | def. | Dominick Reyes | TKO (punches) | 2 | 4:36 | (Note: For the vacant UFC Light Heavyweight Championship.) |
| Flyweight | Brandon Royval | def. | Kai Kara-France | Submission (guillotine choke) | 2 | 0:48 |
| Women's Bantamweight | Ketlen Vieira | def. | Sijara Eubanks | Decision (unanimous) (29–28, 29–28, 29–28) | 3 | 5:00 |
| Catchweight (150 lb) | Hakeem Dawodu | def. | Zubaira Tukhugov | Decision (split) (28–29, 30–27, 29–28) | 3 | 5:00 |
Preliminary card (ESPN2 / ESPN+)
| Lightweight | Brad Riddell | def. | Alex da Silva Coelho | Decision (unanimous) (29–28, 29–28, 29–28) | 3 | 5:00 |
| Welterweight | Jake Matthews | def. | Diego Sanchez | Decision (unanimous) (30–26, 30–26, 30–26) | 3 | 5:00 |
| Catchweight (150 lb) | Ľudovít Klein | def. | Shane Young | KO (head kick and punches) | 1 | 1:16 |
| Light Heavyweight | William Knight | def. | Aleksa Camur | Decision (unanimous) (29–28, 30–27, 30–27) | 3 | 5:00 |
Early Preliminary card (ESPN2 / ESPN+ / UFC Fight Pass)
| Heavyweight | Juan Espino | def. | Jeff Hughes | Submission (scarf hold choke) | 1 | 3:48 |
| Light Heavyweight | Danilo Marques | def. | Khadis Ibragimov | Decision (unanimous) (29–28, 29–28, 30–27) | 3 | 5:00 |

== Bonus awards ==
The following fighters received $50,000 bonuses.

- Fight of the Night: Brandon Royval vs. Kai Kara-France
- Performance of the Night: Israel Adesanya and Jan Błachowicz

== See also ==
- List of UFC events
- List of current UFC fighters
- 2020 in UFC
