= Ian Heinisch =

American mixed martial arts fighter

- Born: Ian Edward Heinisch; August 5, 1988 (age 38); Denver, Colorado, United States
- Other names: The Hurricane
- Height: 5 ft 11 in (1.80 m)
- Weight: 185 lb (84 kg; 13 st 3 lb)
- Division: Middleweight
- Reach: 72 in (183 cm)
- Fighting out of: Phuket, Thailand
- Team: Factory X (2014–2020); Tiger Muay Thai (2020); Genesis Training Academy (2020); Easton Training Center (2020); Sanford MMA (2021–2023)
- Years active: 2015–2023

Mixed martial arts record
- Total: 19
- Wins: 14
- By knockout: 5
- By submission: 2
- By decision: 7
- Losses: 5
- By knockout: 1
- By submission: 1
- By decision: 3

Other information
- University: North Idaho College
- Mixed martial arts record from Sherdog

Ian Edward Heinisch (born August 5, 1988) is an American former mixed martial artist who previously competed in the middleweight division of the Ultimate Fighting Championship. A professional since 2015, he has also competed for the World Series of Fighting and Legacy Fighting Alliance, where he is the former Interim Middleweight Champion.

== Background ==
Heinisch, who is a Colorado native, was diagnosed with ADHD when he was young. His parents home schooled him and placed him in wrestling classes as he had too much energy and could not pay attention in school. He won the Colorado state high school championship and was an All-American twice. He went on to wrestle at North Idaho College but dropped out of school and originally moved to Vancouver, working as a door-to-door salesman before being deported for working illegally. Upon returning to the United States, Heinisch started selling ecstasy pills to keep up with his lifestyle after his parents lost their house and got divorced. He was arrested for selling 2,000 ecstasy pills and headed to Amsterdam to avoid a jail sentence after meeting bail. He ended up working in a bar in Spain and sleeping on the beach for three months. Not long after Heinisch started drug trafficking from South America to Spain and got caught on one of his trips when a Spanish immigration officer found one kilo of cocaine on him. Heinisch ended up in prison at Canary Islands. He taught himself how to speak Spanish by reading a Spanish bible with an English dictionary and taking up boxing. After he finished serving his prison sentence in Spain, Heinisch flew back to New York where he was apprehended upon re-entry to United States for fleeing the country back in 2009. He turned his life around after finishing his sentence at Rikers Island in the United States and pursued an MMA career.

My dream is to open up a gym that’s like a gym we have, an MMA gym/rehab facility where kids under 25 or young kids getting these huge prison sentences instead of them going to prison and pretty much going to crime school and a revolving door in a system that is broken and doesn’t rehabilitate people that can go and get an opportunity to train full time and to have great mentors and people around them and get them on track so they do get rehabilitated. Like I had the opportunity in Spain to do.

== Mixed martial arts career ==
=== Early career ===
Heinisch started his professional MMA career in 2015 and fought under various promotions, namely Sparta Combat League, and Legacy Fighting Alliance where he was the interim middleweight champion after defeating Gabriel Checco and was promoted to middleweight champion after Anthony Hernandez vacated the title in June 2018 when he signed with the UFC. He amassed a record of 10-1 prior to competing in Dana White's Contender Series. Heinisch was nearly cast for The Ultimate Fighter: Team Joanna vs. Team Cláudia as a light heavyweight, however, due to paperwork issues from his time in Spain ultimately prevented him from competing.

=== Dana White's Contender Series ===
Heinisch appeared in Dana White's Contender Series 15 web-series program on July 31, 2018, facing Justin Sumter. He won the fight via knockout in the first round and was signed by UFC.

=== Ultimate Fighting Championship ===
Heinisch made his UFC debut on November 17, 2018, against Cezar Ferreira, replacing injured Tom Breese at UFC Fight Night: Magny vs. Ponzinibbio. He won the fight via unanimous decision.

His next fight came on May 18, 2019, at UFC Fight Night: dos Anjos vs. Lee against Antônio Carlos Júnior He won the fight via unanimous decision.

Heinisch faced Derek Brunson on August 17, 2019, at UFC 241. He lost the fight via unanimous decision.

Heinisch was expected to face Brad Tavares on October 26, 2019, at UFC Fight Night 162 However, Heinisch was removed from the pairing in early October for undisclosed reasons. In turn, Tavares was removed from the event entirely and rescheduled to face Edmen Shahbazyan a week later at UFC 244.

Heinisch faced Omari Akhmedov on December 14, 2019, at UFC 245. He lost the fight via unanimous decision.

On March 31, 2020, Heinisch revealed that after fighting out his contract, Heinisch signed a new, four-fight contract with the UFC.

Heinisch was scheduled to face Gerald Meerschaert on June 6, 2020, at UFC 250. However, two days before the fight his cornerman tested positive for COVID-19. Heinisch was pulled from the fight and replaced by promotional newcomer Anthony Ivy. Subsequently, the cornerman was re-tested and the initial test was proven to be false positive and Heinisch was reinstated to the card. Finally, Heinisch faced Meerschaert as originally scheduled and won the fight via TKO in the first round.

Heinisch was scheduled to face Brendan Allen on June 27, 2020, at UFC on ESPN: Poirier vs. Hooker. However, Heinisch pulled out of the matchup in mid-June citing an injury and was replaced by promotional newcomer Kyle Daukaus. The bout between Heinisch and Allen was rescheduled again on November 7, 2020, at UFC on ESPN: Santos vs. Teixeira. On the day of the event, the UFC announced the bout was once again canceled due to Heinisch testing positive for COVID-19.

Heinisch was scheduled to face Kelvin Gastelum on January 30, 2021, at UFC Fight Night 186. On December 26, 2020, it was announced that the bout had moved to UFC 258 on February 13, 2021. Heinisch lost the fight via unanimous decision.

Heinisch faced Nassourdine Imavov on July 24, 2021, at UFC on ESPN: Sandhagen vs. Dillashaw. He lost the fight via technical knockout in round two.

Heinisch was scheduled to face Sam Alvey on February 5, 2022, at UFC Fight Night 200. Heinisch pulled out due to undisclosed reasons in late December and was replaced by Phil Hawes.

On July 20, 2023, Heinisch announced that he was retiring from MMA to concentrate on treatment for his concussion issues.

== Championships and achievements ==
- Legacy Fighting Alliance
  - Interim LFA Middleweight Champion (One time; former)

== Mixed martial arts record ==
Professional record breakdown
19 matches	14 wins	5 losses
By knockout	5	1
By submission	2	1
By decision	7	3

Res.	Record	Opponent	Method	Event	Date	Round	Time	Location	Notes
Loss	14–5	Nassourdine Imavov	TKO (knee and punches)	UFC on ESPN: Sandhagen vs. Dillashaw	July 24, 2021	2	3:09	Las Vegas, Nevada, United States	
Loss	14–4	Kelvin Gastelum	Decision (unanimous)	UFC 258	February 13, 2021	3	5:00	Las Vegas, Nevada, United States	
Win	14–3	Gerald Meerschaert	TKO (punches)	UFC 250	June 6, 2020	1	1:14	Las Vegas, Nevada, United States	
Loss	13–3	Omari Akhmedov	Decision (unanimous)	UFC 245	December 14, 2019	3	5:00	Las Vegas, Nevada, United States	
Loss	13–2	Derek Brunson	Decision (unanimous)	UFC 241	August 17, 2019	3	5:00	Anaheim, California, United States	
Win	13–1	Antônio Carlos Júnior	Decision (unanimous)	UFC Fight Night: dos Anjos vs. Lee	May 18, 2019	3	5:00	Rochester, New York, United States	
Win	12–1	Cezar Ferreira	Decision (unanimous)	UFC Fight Night: Magny vs. Ponzinibbio	November 17, 2018	3	5:00	Buenos Aires, Argentina	
Win	11–1	Justin Sumter	KO (elbows)	Dana White's Contender Series 15	July 31, 2018	1	3:37	Las Vegas, Nevada, United States	
Win	10–1	Gabriel Checco	KO (punches)	LFA 39	May 4, 2018	1	3:44	Vail, Colorado, United States	Won the interim LFA Middleweight Championship. Later promoted to undisputed champion.
Win	9–1	Daniel Madrid	KO (punch)	LFA 31	January 19, 2018	1	3:44	Phoenix, Arizona, United States	
Loss	8–1	Markus Perez	Submission (arm-triangle choke)	LFA 22	September 8, 2017	1	2:14	Broomfield, Colorado, United States	For the vacant LFA Middleweight Championship.
Win	8–0	Lucas Rota	Submission (scarf hold armlock)	LFA 10	April 21, 2017	1	2:38	Pueblo, Colorado, United States	
Win	7–0	Hayward Charles	Decision (unanimous)	SCL 53	October 15, 2016	3	5:00	Denver, Colorado, United States	Defended the SCL Middleweight Championship.
Win	6–0	Jeremy Spelts	Submission (scarf hold armlock)	SCL: AVM 7	April 23, 2016	1	4:34	Loveland, Colorado, United States	Defended the SCL Middleweight Championship.
Win	5–0	Tyler Vogel	Decision (unanimous)	WSOF 29	March 12, 2016	3	5:00	Greeley, Colorado, United States	
Win	4–0	Kris Hocum	Decision (unanimous)	SCL 45	October 24, 2015	3	5:00	Denver, Colorado, United States	Won the SCL Middleweight Championship.
Win	3–0	Zack Wells	Decision (unanimous)	SCL 42	July 18, 2015	3	5:00	Castle Rock, Colorado, United States	
Win	2–0	Canaan Grigsby	Decision (unanimous)	SCL: Army vs. Marines 6	April 25, 2015	3	5:00	Loveland, Colorado, United States	
Win	1–0	Dante Florez	TKO (punches)	SCL 40	January 24, 2015	1	3:06	Denver, Colorado, United States	

== See also ==
- List of Dana White's Contender Series alumni
- List of male mixed martial artists
