= Greg Hardy =

American mixed martial artist and American football player (born 1988)

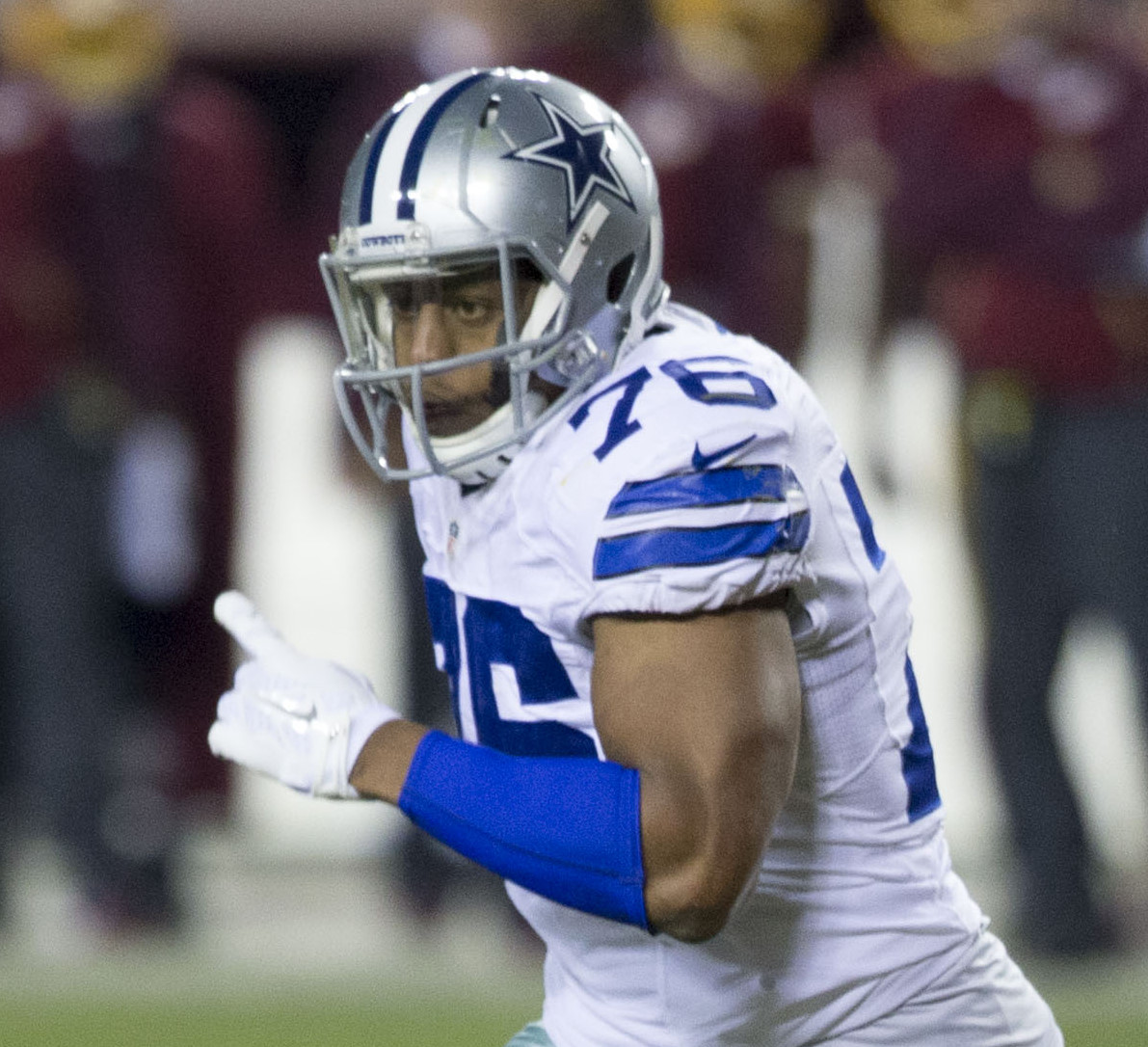
- Hardy with the Dallas Cowboys in 2015

No. 76
- Position: Defensive end

Personal information
- Born: July 28, 1988 (age 38); Millington, Tennessee, U.S.
- Listed height: 6 ft 5 in (1.96 m)
- Listed weight: 280 lb (127 kg)

Career information
- High school: Briarcrest (Eads, Tennessee)
- College: Ole Miss (2006–2009)
- NFL draft: 2010: 6th round, 175th overall pick

Career history
- Carolina Panthers (2010–2014); Dallas Cowboys (2015); Richmond Roughriders (2018)

Awards and highlights
- Second-team All-Pro (2013); Pro Bowl (2013); Second-team All-American (2007); First-team All-SEC (2007); Second-team All-SEC (2008)

Career NFL statistics
- Games played: 75
- Tackles: 238
- Sacks: 40.0
- Forced fumbles: 8
- Stats at Pro Football Reference

Gregory McKarl Hardy (born July 28, 1988) is an American mixed martial artist, boxer, and former football defensive end. He played football for six seasons in the National Football League (NFL), primarily with the Carolina Panthers.

Hardy played college football for the Ole Miss Rebels and was selected by the Panthers in the sixth round of the 2010 NFL draft. His most successful season was in 2013 when he set the Panthers single-season record for sacks, earning him Pro Bowl and second-team All-Pro honors. During the following off-season, however, Hardy was found guilty of assaulting a former girlfriend. Following Hardy's appeal, the case was dismissed after the victim failed to appear in court. The ensuing controversy led to him not being re-signed by the Panthers after playing one game with them in 2014. Hardy spent his final NFL season with the Dallas Cowboys.

After the conclusion of his football career, Hardy became a mixed martial artist. He was signed to the Ultimate Fighting Championship (UFC) from 2019 to 2022, where he competed in the heavyweight division.

== Early life ==
Hardy attended Briarcrest Christian School in Eads, Tennessee, where he was a three-sport letterman in football, basketball and track. In football, he helped lead his team to the state championship in 2004. As a senior, he was credited with 65 tackles, including 12 for loss and six sacks, while also receiving 48 passes for 268 yards. Hardy played with offensive tackle Michael Oher at both Briarcrest Christian School and Ole Miss. In basketball, he was an honorable mention all-state as a junior.

In track & field, Hardy earned a letter competing as a sprinter and shot putter. In sprints, he ran the 200-meter dash in 24.04 seconds as a sophomore. In the shot put, he got a top-throw of 14.47 meters (47 ft 6 in). In addition, he also recorded a 4.8-second 40-yard dash and had a 28-inch vertical jump.

Hardy was considered a three-star prospect by Rivals.com, and was ranked No. 30 among weakside defensive end prospects, No. 44 according to Scout.com. He was an all-state pick who was rated as the No. 5 player in Tennessee by Super Prep, No. 8 by Scout.com and No. 12 by Rivals.com. He was also named All-Metro by The Commercial Appeal.

== Football career ==
=== College ===
Hardy accepted a football scholarship from the University of Mississippi. As a freshman, he played in all 12 games, with 9 starts at left defensive end. He posted 49 tackles (fifth on the team), 3 sacks, 5 tackles for loss, 4 forced fumbles and 2 fumble recoveries. He spent time at wide receiver against Mississippi State University, making a 23 yards touchdown reception.

As a sophomore, he played in 10 games out of 12 games with four starts at defensive end. He tallied 64 tackles (fourth on the team), 10 sacks (led the conference), 18.5 tackles for loss (second in the conference), 3 forced fumbles and 2 touchdown receptions on offense.

As a junior, he missed the first three games after having foot surgery to repair a broken bone in his right foot. He played in 9 out of 13 games because of injuries, recording 18 tackles, 8.5 sacks (third in the conference), 9.5 tackles for loss, 3 quarterback pressures, one interception and one pass defensed. Hardy was considered one of the best pass rushers eligible for the 2009 NFL draft but he elected to return to Ole Miss for his senior season.

In January 2009, he underwent a second surgery to his right foot during the off-season. On July 12, 2009, he was involved in a car accident along with teammate Dexter McCluster, where he aggravated the foot injury and was put back in a walking cast.

As a senior, he appeared in 9 out of 13 games (including the Cotton Bowl Classic), after missing the final three regular-season contests because of a surgery on his fractured left wrist. He registered 16 tackles, 6.5 tackles for loss, 5 sacks (tied for third on the team), 4 quarterback pressures, 3 passes defensed and one fumble recovery. Hardy finished his college career with 39.5 career tackles for loss and 26.5 sacks.

In the 2006–07 basketball season, he played in 15 games (one start), while averaging just under one point and two rebounds per contest. His best performance came against the two-time national champion University of Florida in the semifinals of the 2007 SEC tournament, where he had 6 points and 4 rebounds.

=== Professional career ===
==== Pre-draft ====
Pre-draft measurables
Height	Weight	Arm length	Hand span	40-yard dash	10-yard split	20-yard split	20-yard shuttle	Three-cone drill	Vertical jump	Broad jump	Bench press	Wonderlic
6 ft 4 in (1.93 m)	281 lb (127 kg)	34 in (0.86 m)	9 3/4 in (0.25 m)	4.79 s	1.67 s	2.81 s	4.62 s	7.13 s	36.0 in (0.91 m)	10 ft 1 in (3.07 m)	21 reps	19
All values from NFL Combine/Mississippi Pro Day

In the April 2009 edition of Sports Illustrated, Hardy was named a top prospect for the 2010 NFL draft. However, injuries, poor production, and an unimpressive combine caused his draft stock to fall significantly.

==== Carolina Panthers ====
Hardy was selected by the Carolina Panthers in the sixth round (175th overall) of the 2010 NFL draft. He was signed to a contract on June 17, 2010. Hardy managed to record a blocked punt for a safety as well as force a fumble and record 4 tackles in his rookie debut.

Although Hardy had played in 15 games his rookie year, he had started none. He did, however, finish the year with 30 tackles, 3 sacks, two forced fumbles, and the aforementioned safety.

Hardy recorded 11 sacks in 2012 in spite of sustaining a broken thumb in September.

On November 9, 2012, Hardy was fined $15,750 for a roughing the passer penalty against Robert Griffin III versus the Washington Redskins in Week 9.

On June 11, 2013, Hardy spoke to reporters during a summer minicamp claiming his goal for sacks in the 2013 season to be 50. Regarding such a lofty number, more than twice the current record, Hardy stated, "Why shoot low, right? If I'm going to shoot at it, I'm going to shoot at it with a .50 caliber. I'm going to shoot at a little bird with a .50-caliber bullet. That's the goal for this year, 50 sacks, that's where I'm at. That's the goal, 50. You heard it first."

In a road victory against the Atlanta Falcons, Hardy finished with a single game team record four sacks. He ended up recording a team-record 15 sacks, earning his first trip to the 2014 Pro Bowl and being named a second-team All Pro by the Associated Press. The Panthers defense finished first in the NFL with 60 sacks in 2013, second in points per game, and third in DVOA team defense. He was ranked 53rd in the NFL Top 100 for his breakout performance in the 2013 NFL season.

Hardy was set to become a free agent during the 2014 offseason, but it was announced on February 28, 2014, that the Panthers had placed the franchise tag on him, allowing him to return to the field for them during the 2014 season. Hardy played the first game of the 2014 season, but was placed on the commissioner's exempt list while his domestic violence case played out. He remained there for the rest of the season.

In March 2015, the Panthers decided not to re-sign Hardy. Panthers owner Jerry Richardson made the decision to cut ties with Hardy. Despite requests from players and coaches to let Hardy have another chance, Richardson said that he made the decision not to do so because "we do the right things."

==== Dallas Cowboys ====
On March 18, 2015, Hardy signed as a free agent a one-year, $11.3 million contract with the Dallas Cowboys. The Cowboys were looking for him to be a difference-maker at right defensive end and as expected, were criticized by the public and the media for the signing.

On April 22, Hardy was suspended for the first 10 games of the 2015 season without pay due to violating the NFL Personal Conduct Policy. On July 10, the NFL reduced it to a 4-game suspension, in order to avoid a possible legal action on Hardy's part.

His first game after the suspension came against the New England Patriots. He had two sacks and five hits on quarterback Tom Brady. Two games later, against the Seattle Seahawks, he tipped a pass from Russell Wilson and intercepted it.

After his quick start, Hardy's production dropped. He led the team in quarterback pressures (32) and was second in sacks (6), but only three of those sacks came in the last nine games. Hardy also drew the ire of coach Jason Garrett due to inappropriate tweets, frequent tardiness, and being a bad influence on the younger players on the team. The Cowboys chose not to re-sign Hardy after the season.

==== Spring League and indoor football ====
Hardy participated in The Spring League in 2017. He signed with the Richmond Roughriders of the American Arena League in January 2018.

== NFL career statistics ==
Year	Team	Games		Tackles					Interceptions						Fumbles	
Year	Team	GP	GS	Cmb	Solo	Ast	Sck	Sfty	PD	Int	Yds	Avg	Lng	TD	FF	FR
2010	CAR	15	0	30	24	6	3.0	1	1	0	0	0.0	0	0	2	0
2011	CAR	16	15	50	38	12	4.0	1	11	0	0	0.0	0	0	1	0
2012	CAR	15	10	61	41	20	11.0	0	2	0	0	0.0	0	0	2	1
2013	CAR	16	13	59	39	20	15.0	0	1	0	0	0.0	0	0	1	1
2014	CAR	1	1	4	3	1	1.0	0	0	0	0	0.0	0	0	1	0
2015	DAL	12	12	35	23	12	6.0	0	1	1	9	9.0	9	0	1	0
Total		75	52	239	168	71	40.0	2	16	1	9	9.0	9	0	8	2

== Domestic violence charges and suspension ==
On May 13, 2014, Hardy was arrested for assault and communicating threats, after he was alleged to have assaulted an ex-girlfriend by grabbing her, throwing her into furniture, strangling her, and threatening to kill her. On July 15, a judge found him guilty of assault and communicating threats, and sentenced him to 18 months' probation, suspending a 60-day jail sentence. When Hardy appealed the decision, requesting a jury trial, the victim failed to appear in court to testify. As a result, the prosecutor's office dropped the charges, citing their inability to locate the victim, and "reliable information" that the two parties had reached a civil settlement.

Hardy's arrest and trial was the focus of considerable controversy, as news media drew comparisons to other NFL-related domestic violence cases, including those against other NFL players. Panthers head coach Ron Rivera initially told news media that he was comfortable having Hardy play, but on September 14, 2014, Hardy was deactivated. On September 17, 2014, he was placed on the exempt list by the league, which meant that he could continue to draw his salary but was prohibited in taking part in any team activities. He would never play another game for the Panthers.

On April 22, 2015, NFL Commissioner Roger Goodell suspended Hardy for 10 games, after the league's two-month-long investigation found that there was "sufficient credible evidence" that Hardy had engaged in conduct which "violated NFL policies in multiple respects and with aggravating circumstances." The league's investigation had concluded that Hardy used physical force in at least four instances, including placing his hands around the victim's neck with enough pressure to leave visible marks, and that his actions were "a significant act of violence in violation of the Personal Conduct Policy."

On July 10, 2015, an arbiter reduced Hardy's suspension from ten games to four games.

On November 5, 2015, the domestic violence charges against Hardy were expunged from his record. The following day, Deadspin released police photographs of Hardy's ex-girlfriend's injuries.

On September 26, 2016, Hardy was arrested for cocaine possession in Dallas, Texas.

On June 4, 2025, it was reported that Hardy was arrested for allegedly assaulting a family member. Specifically, the records show he was booked on a charge of "assault causes bodily injury family member".

== Personal life ==
Hardy has a daughter and a son.

== Mixed martial arts career ==
Greg Hardy
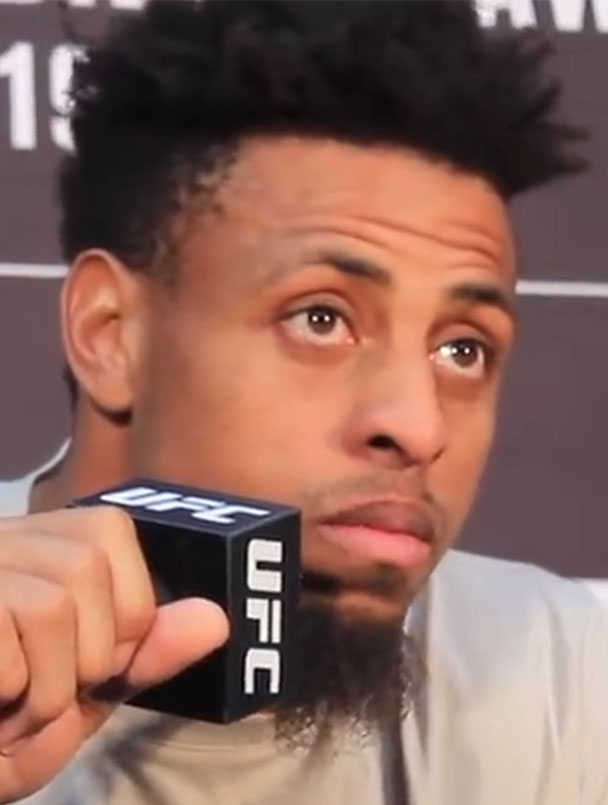
- Hardy at UFC Fight Night 143 post fight interview
- Other names: Prince Of War
- Height: 6 ft 5 in (1.96 m)
- Weight: 266 lb (121 kg)
- Division: Heavyweight
- Reach: 80 in (203 cm)
- Fighting out of: Coconut Creek, Florida, United States
- Team: American Top Team (2016–2020)
- Trainer: Din Thomas; Rashad Evans
- Years active: 2017–present (MMA)

Professional boxing record
- Total: 4
- Wins: 3
- By knockout: 2
- Losses: 1
- By knockout: 1

Mixed martial arts record
- Total: 16
- Wins: 9
- By knockout: 7
- By decision: 2
- Losses: 6
- By knockout: 4
- By decision: 1
- By disqualification: 1
- No contests: 1

Amateur record
- Total: 3
- Wins: 3
- By knockout: 3

Other information
- Mixed martial arts record from Sherdog

=== Amateur career ===
In October 2016, Hardy announced he would start a mixed martial arts career and had been training for several months, although he had no previous experience in MMA.

Hardy made his amateur MMA debut on November 4, 2017, in which he defeated Joe Hawkins by knockout in a 32-second match. Hardy's amateur MMA record improved to 2–0 on December 1, 2017, with another first-round TKO victory, this time over debuting amateur Kenneth Woods. On February 16, 2018, Hardy was victorious in his third amateur bout, defeating Ryan Chester via knockout 14 seconds into the first round.

=== Professional career ===
In April 2018, it was announced that Hardy would make his professional debut at Dana White's Contender Series 9 on June 12. He fought fellow former NFL defensive end Austen Lane and won by a knockout in the first round. Afterwards, he was awarded a contract by the UFC.

For his second professional fight, Hardy faced Tebaris Gordon on the Dana White's Contender Series 16 of Dana White's Tuesday Night Contender Series. He won by TKO in the fight's opening minute. Following the win over Gordon, Hardy said he was committed to his MMA career and would only consider a return to the NFL if it was with the Dallas Cowboys or the Carolina Panthers.

For the third fight of his professional career, Hardy faced Rasheem Jones at Xtreme Fight Night 352 on September 29, 2018. He won by knockout at 53 seconds in the first round.

=== Ultimate Fighting Championship ===
After obtaining an undefeated professional record of 3–0, with all 3 wins coming by way of knockout inside one minute, Hardy made his Ultimate Fighting Championship promotional debut against Allen Crowder on January 19, 2019, at UFC Fight Night: Cejudo vs. Dillashaw. Hardy lost the fight via disqualification. Hardy hit Crowder with his knee while Crowder was down on the ground, leaving Crowder unable to continue.

For his second UFC fight, Hardy faced Dmitry Smolyakov on April 27, 2019, at UFC Fight Night: Jacaré vs. Hermansson. He won the fight via TKO in the first round.

Hardy faced Juan Adams on July 20, 2019, at UFC on ESPN 4. He won the fight via TKO in the first round.

Hardy was scheduled to face Jarjis Danho on October 26, 2019, at UFC Fight Night 162. However, Danho was pulled from the event for undisclosed reasons. In turn, Hardy was rescheduled and faced promotional newcomer Ben Sosoli a week earlier at UFC on ESPN 6. He originally won the fight via unanimous decision; however, Hardy's non-permitted use of an inhaler in between the second and third round caused the Massachusetts State Athletic Commission to overrule the original decision to a no contest.

In a quick turnaround, Hardy took a major step up in competition and replaced Junior dos Santos to face Alexander Volkov on November 9, 2019, at UFC Fight Night 163. Hardy lost the fight via unanimous decision.

Hardy was initially scheduled to face Yorgan De Castro on March 28, 2020, at UFC on ESPN: Ngannou vs. Rozenstruik. Due to the COVID-19 pandemic, the event was eventually postponed . However, on April 9, Dana White, the president of UFC announced that this event was postponed and the bout eventually took place on May 9, 2020. Hardy won the fight via unanimous decision.

Hardy faced Maurice Greene on October 31, 2020, at UFC Fight Night 181. He won the fight via technical knockout in round two.

Hardy faced Marcin Tybura on December 19, 2020, at UFC Fight Night 183. He knocked down Tybura in the first round but lost the fight in the second round via technical knockout.

Hardy faced Tai Tuivasa on July 10, 2021, at UFC 264. He lost the fight via knockout in round one.

Hardy was scheduled to face Aleksei Oleinik on January 22, 2022, at UFC 270. However, Oleynik withdrew from the event for undisclosed reasons and he was replaced by Serghei Spivac. In turn, just a week before the event Hardy withdrew due to a finger injury and the bout was removed from the event. The pair was moved to UFC 272 on March 5, 2022. Hardy lost the fight via technical knockout in round one.

Having fought out his contract, Hardy became a free agent after he was not re-signed by the organization.

=== Post UFC ===
Hardy was scheduled to face Chase Sherman on November 15, 2024, at Gamebred Bareknuckle MMA 8. However, Hardy withdrew for unknown reasons.

==== Global Fight League ====
On December 11, 2024, it was announced that Hardy was eligible to be drafted in the Global Fight League. However, he was not drafted for the 2025 season. In turn, in April 2025, it was reported that all GFL events were cancelled indefinitely.

==== Other promotions ====
After missing weight by over 25 pounds, Hardy faced former two-time KSW Heavyweight Championship challenger Darko Stošić at FNC 31 on May 30, 2026 and lost the bout by knockout in the third round.

== Professional boxing career ==
=== Hardy vs. Cook ===
On October 8, 2022, Hardy made his professional boxing debut against Mike Cook. Hardy won via knockout in the 2nd round.

=== Rahman Jr. vs. Hardy ===
On November 19, 2022, Hardy fought American professional boxer Hasim Rahman Jr. on the undercard of MF & DAZN: X Series 003. Hardy took the fight on 1 week notice after Rahman Jr.'s previous opponent, Vitor Belfort, withdrew after testing positive for COVID-19. Hardy defeated Rahman Jr. via unanimous decision.

=== Corbin vs. Hardy ===
On September 30, 2023, Hardy fought American professional boxer Gregory Corbin at the Tower Club in Dallas. He won the fight by retirement after the first round.

=== Papin vs. Hardy ===
On December 13, 2024, Hardy faced Alexei Papin in Russia and was knocked out in the third round.

== Bare-knuckle boxing career ==
=== Bare Knuckle Fighting Championship ===
After his tenure in the UFC, news surfaced on June 15, 2022, that Hardy had signed a multi-fight contract with the Bare Knuckle Fighting Championship.

Hardy made his bare-knuckle debut against Josh Watson at BKFC KnuckleMania 3 on February 17, 2023. Hardy lost the fight by knockout in round 2.

== Exhibition boxing career ==
=== Team Combat League ===
Hardy has competed in numerous exhibition rounds with Team Combat League boxing promotion. On June 2, 2023, Hardy was knocked out by Alexander Flores which was his first loss since joining the promotion with the Dallas Enforcers boxing team. On May 23, 2024, Hardy was knocked out by professional boxer Patrick Mailata.

== Championships and accomplishments ==
=== Mixed martial arts ===
- Ultimate Fighting Championship
  - UFC.com Awards
    - 2019: Ranked #9 Newcomer of the Year

== Mixed martial arts record ==
Professional record breakdown
16 matches	9 wins	6 losses
By knockout	7	4
By decision	2	1
By disqualification	0	1
No contests	1	

Res.	Record	Opponent	Method	Event	Date	Round	Time	Location	Notes
Win	9–6 (1)	Joseph Holmes	TKO (punches)	Peak Fighting 53	July 18, 2026	3	1:35	Frisco, Texas, United States	Defended the Peak Fighting Heavyweight Championship.
Loss	8–6 (1)	Darko Stošić	KO (punches)	FNC 31	May 30, 2026	3	2:42	Belgrade, Serbia	Catchweight (292.3 lb) bout; Hardy missed weight.
Win	8–5 (1)	Philip Latu	Decision (unanimous)	Peak Fighting 50	January 30, 2026	5	5:00	Frisco, Texas, United States	Won the vacant Peak Fighting Heavyweight Championship.
Loss	7–5 (1)	Serghei Spivac	TKO (punches)	UFC 272	March 5, 2022	1	2:16	Las Vegas, Nevada, United States	
Loss	7–4 (1)	Tai Tuivasa	KO (punches)	UFC 264	July 10, 2021	1	1:07	Las Vegas, Nevada, United States	
Loss	7–3 (1)	Marcin Tybura	TKO (punches)	UFC Fight Night: Thompson vs. Neal	December 19, 2020	2	4:31	Las Vegas, Nevada, United States	
Win	7–2 (1)	Maurice Greene	TKO (punches)	UFC Fight Night: Hall vs. Silva	October 31, 2020	2	1:12	Las Vegas, Nevada, United States	
Win	6–2 (1)	Yorgan De Castro	Decision (unanimous)	UFC 249	May 9, 2020	3	5:00	Jacksonville, Florida, United States	
Loss	5–2 (1)	Alexander Volkov	Decision (unanimous)	UFC Fight Night: Magomedsharipov vs. Kattar	November 9, 2019	3	5:00	Moscow, Russia	
NC	5–1 (1)	Ben Sosoli	NC (overturned by MSAC)	UFC on ESPN: Reyes vs. Weidman	October 18, 2019	3	5:00	Boston, Massachusetts, United States	Originally a unanimous decision win for Hardy; overturned after he used an inhaler in between rounds.
Win	5–1	Juan Adams	TKO (punches)	UFC on ESPN: dos Anjos vs. Edwards	July 20, 2019	1	0:45	San Antonio, Texas, United States	
Win	4–1	Dmitry Smolyakov	TKO (punches)	UFC Fight Night: Jacaré vs. Hermansson	April 27, 2019	1	2:15	Sunrise, Florida, United States	
Loss	3–1	Allen Crowder	DQ (illegal knee)	UFC Fight Night: Cejudo vs. Dillashaw	January 19, 2019	2	2:28	Brooklyn, New York, United States	
Win	3–0	Rasheem Jones	KO (punches)	Xtreme Fight Night 352	September 29, 2018	1	0:53	Tulsa, Oklahoma, United States	
Win	2–0	Tebaris Gordon	TKO (punches)	Dana White's Contender Series 16	August 7, 2018	1	0:17	Las Vegas, Nevada, United States	
Win	1–0	Austen Lane	TKO (punches)	Dana White's Contender Series 9	June 12, 2018	1	0:57	Las Vegas, Nevada, United States	Heavyweight debut.

Amateur record breakdown		
3 matches	3 wins	0 losses
By knockout	3	0

Res.	Record	Opponent	Method	Event	Date	Round	Time	Location	Notes
Win	3–0	Ryan Chester	TKO (punches)	Legacy Fighting Alliance 33	February 16, 2018	1	0:14	Dallas, Texas, United States	
Win	2–0	Kenneth Woods	TKO (head kick and punches)	Rite of Passage 2	December 1, 2017	1	1:36	Bossier City, Louisiana, United States	
Win	1–0	Joe Hawkins	TKO (punches)	Rise of a Warrior 21	November 4, 2017	1	0:32	Fort Pierce, Florida, United States	

== Professional boxing record ==
3 fights	3 wins	0 losses
By knockout	2	0
By decision	1	0

No.	Result	Record	Opponent	Type	Round, time	Date	Location	Notes
3	Win	3–0	Gregory Corbin	RTD	1 (4), 3:00	Sep 30, 2023	Tower Club, Dallas, Texas, U.S.	
2	Win	2–0	Hasim Rahman Jr.	UD	4	Nov 19, 2022	Moody Center, Austin, Texas, U.S.	
1	Win	1–0	Mike Cook	KO	2 (4), 0:14	Oct 8, 2022	Tennis Centre, Delray Beach, Florida, U.S.	

== Exhibition boxing record ==
1 fight	0 wins	1 loss
By knockout	0	1

No.	Result	Record	Opponent	Type	Round, time	Date	Location	Notes
1	Loss	0–1	Alexei Papin	KO	3 (6), 1:39	Dec 13, 2024	Megasport Sport Palace, Moscow, Russia	

== Bare-knuckle boxing record ==
Professional record breakdown
1 match	0 wins	1 loss
By knockout	0	1

Res.	Record	Opponent	Method	Event	Date	Round	Time	Location	Notes
Loss	0–1	Josh Watson	KO (punch)	BKFC KnuckleMania 3	February 17, 2023	2	0:19	Albuquerque, New Mexico, United States	
