= Ciryl Gane =

French mixed martial artist (born 1990)

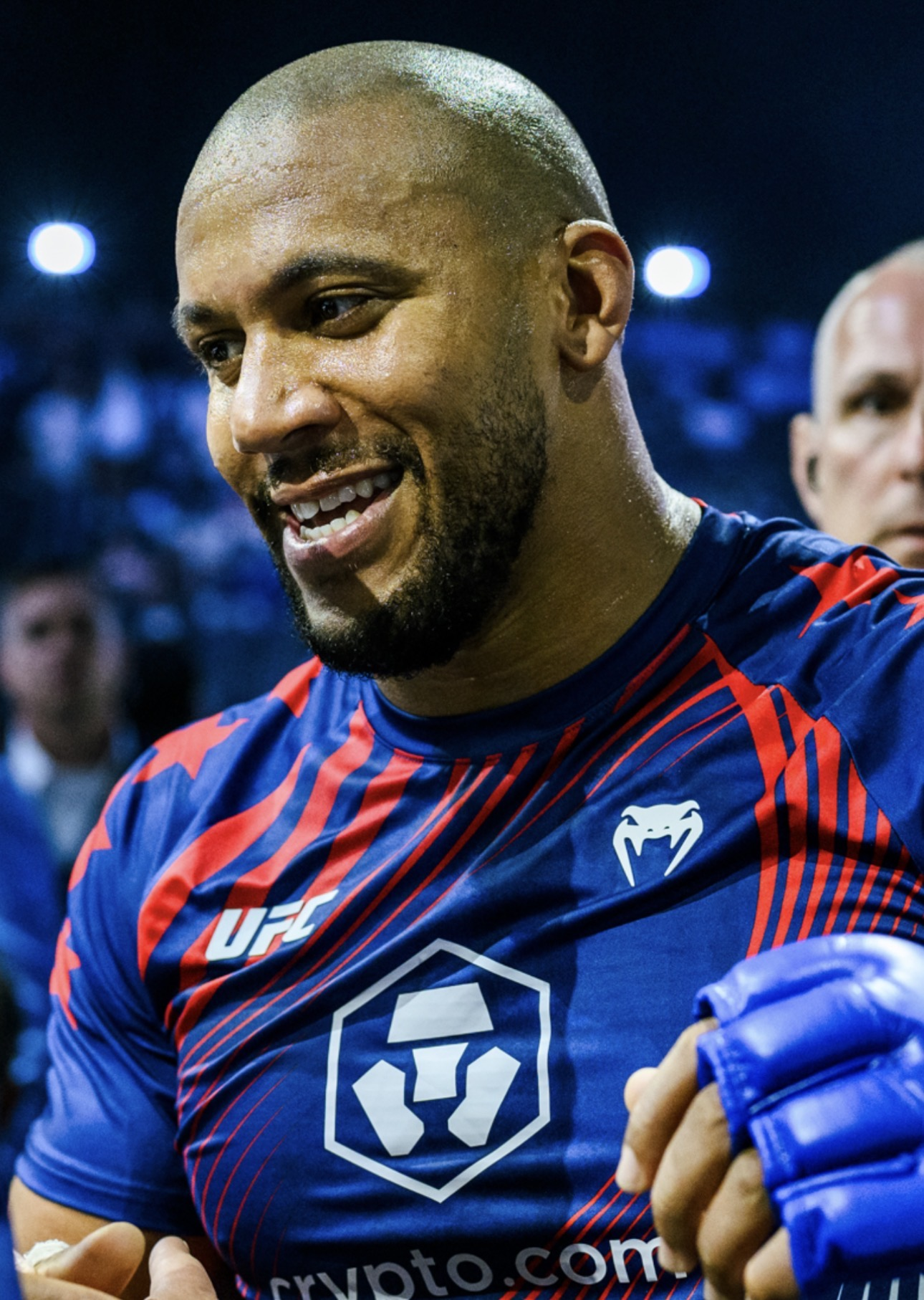
- Gane in 2026
- Born: Ciryl Romain Gane; April 12, 1990 (age 36); La Roche-sur-Yon, Vendée, France
- Nickname: Bon Gamin (Good Kid)
- Height: 6 ft 4 in (193 cm)
- Weight: 243 lb (110 kg; 17 st 5 lb)
- Division: Heavyweight
- Reach: 81 in (206 cm)
- Fighting out of: Paris, France
- Team: MMA Factory (2017–present)
- Trainer: Fernand Lopez
- Years active: 2018–present (MMA); 2014–2018 (Muay Thai)

Mixed martial arts record
- Total: 18
- Wins: 15
- By knockout: 7
- By submission: 3
- By decision: 5
- Losses: 2
- By submission: 1
- By decision: 1
- No contests: 1

Muay Thai record
- Total: 13
- Wins: 13
- By knockout: 9

Other information
- Mixed martial arts record from Sherdog

Ciryl Romain Gane (born April 12, 1990) is a French professional mixed martial artist, actor, and former Muay Thai fighter. He currently competes in the Heavyweight division of the Ultimate Fighting Championship (UFC), where he is the current UFC Heavyweight Champion and the first French champion in UFC history. A professional since 2014, Gane has also formerly competed for TKO Major League MMA where he was the Heavyweight Champion. As of November 17, 2026, he is #8 in the UFC men's pound-for-pound rankings.

== Early life ==
Gane was born in La Roche-sur-Yon in the Vendée department. His paternal family has roots in the French overseas department of Guadeloupe in the Carribean (French Antilles). His father, Romain Gane was a bus driver, and footballer in the Division d'Honneur. As a youth, Ciryl played football and basketball. Despite his sporting talent, he decided to work in sales at a furniture store and he joined a work-study program in Paris. During this time, a former classmate introduced him to Muay Thai.

== Muay Thai career ==
Gane made his professional debut on June 4, 2016, in a AFMT Muay thai heavyweight title fight against Jérémy Jeanne. He won the fight by a second-round knockout.

After a decision win against Samih Bachar, Gane was scheduled to fight the K-1 veteran Brice Guidon at La Nuit Des Titans. He beat Guidon by a third-round knockout.

Gane was scheduled to defend his AFMT title against Jonathan Gengoul at Muay Thai Spirit 5. He won the fight by a first-round knockout.

At Warriors Night, Gane beat Bangaly Keita by a third-round knockout. He was then scheduled to fight the multiple-time WBC Muaythai champion Yassine Boughanem at Duel 2. Gane won the fight by decision.

== Mixed martial arts career ==
=== Early career ===
Coached by Fernand Lopez, Ciryl Gane made his professional MMA debut in 2018. He was first contracted to the Canadian MMA promotion TKO, where his first fight was for the vacant TKO heavyweight championship, against Bobby Sullivan. He won the title fight in the first round through a front choke.

He defended the heavyweight championship a month later against Adam Dyczka, winning the fight in the second round via a TKO. His third fight in TKO, and his second title defense, was against Roggers Souza, which he won in the first round by a TKO.

=== Ultimate Fighting Championship ===
==== 2019 ====
Gane made his promotional debut on August 10, 2019, at UFC Fight Night: Shevchenko vs. Carmouche 2 against Raphael Pessoa. Gane won the fight by an arm triangle choke at the end of the first round.

Gane faced Don'Tale Mayes on October 26, 2019, at UFC Fight Night: Maia vs. Askren. Gane won the fight via a heel hook in the third round, earning him a Performance of the Night bonus.

Gane faced Tanner Boser on December 21, 2019, at UFC Fight Night: Edgar vs. The Korean Zombie. He won the fight via unanimous decision.

==== 2020 ====
Gane was scheduled to face Shamil Abdurakhimov on April 18, 2020, at UFC 249. However, on March 5, 2020, it was announced that Gane was forced to pull out from the event after suffering pneumothorax during training. The bout was eventually rescheduled for July 11, 2020, at UFC 251. Subsequently, the pairing was cancelled a second time and scrapped from this event in mid-June as Abdurakhimov was removed from the bout for undisclosed reasons. In turn, Gane was expected to face Sergei Pavlovich on August 8, 2020, at UFC Fight Night 174. Pavlovich however had to pull out because of an injury. Therefore the original fight against Shamil Abdurakhimov was scheduled again on September 26, 2020, at UFC 253; however, the bout was rescheduled again to UFC Fight Night 180 on October 18, 2020. The bout fell through once again as Abdurakhimov pulled out due to undisclosed reasons on September 28, 2020, and he was replaced by promotional newcomer Ante Delija. On October 14, 2020, it was announced that the bout was cancelled due to Delija's contractual problems with his previous deal with the PFL.

Gane faced Junior dos Santos on December 12, 2020, at UFC 256. He won the fight via technical knockout in the second round.

==== 2021 ====
Gane faced Jairzinho Rozenstruik on February 27, 2021, at UFC Fight Night 186. He won the fight via unanimous decision.

Gane faced Alexander Volkov on June 26, 2021, at UFC Fight Night 190. He won the fight via unanimous decision.

Gane faced Derrick Lewis on August 7, 2021, at UFC 265 for the Interim UFC Heavyweight Championship. He won the one-sided fight via technical knockout in round three. This fight earned him the Performance of the Night award.

==== 2022 ====
Gane faced Francis Ngannou for the UFC Heavyweight Championship on January 22, 2022, at UFC 270. Gane was ahead after the first two rounds, but Ngannou switched to wrestling and controlled him for the majority rounds three through five. He lost the fight via unanimous decision, marking his first defeat in any martial arts competition.

Gane faced Tai Tuivasa on September 3, 2022, at UFC Fight Night 209. He won the fight via knockout in round three. This fight earned him the Fight of the Night award.

==== 2023 ====
Gane faced Jon Jones for the vacant UFC Heavyweight Championship on March 4, 2023, at UFC 285. He lost via a guillotine choke submission in the first round.

Gane faced Serghei Spivac on September 2, 2023, at UFC Fight Night 226. He won the fight via TKO in the second round. The win also earned Gane his third Performance of the Night bonus award.

==== 2024 ====
Gane was scheduled to face former Bellator Heavyweight World Champion Alexander Volkov in a rematch on October 26, 2024 at UFC 308. However, due to Volkov's knee injury, the bout was moved and took place on December 7, 2024 at UFC 310. Gane won the close fight by a controversial split decision. 19 out of 20 media outlets scored the bout for Volkov. UFC CEO Dana White apologized to Volkov after the bout saying he thought Volkov had won the bout and the head of the commission explained to White what was thought to be the reasoning of the judges' scorecards.

==== 2025 ====
Gane competed for the heavyweight championship for the third time against current champion Tom Aspinall on October 25, 2025 at UFC 321. During a competitive first round with both men exchanging, Gane extended his hand poking Aspinall in both eyes. Aspinall was unable to continue and the fight was ruled a no contest.

==== 2026 ====
Gane won the interim heavyweight championship against former UFC Middleweight and two-time UFC Light Heavyweight champion Alex Pereira on June 14, 2026 at UFC Freedom 250. He won the championship by technical knockout in the second round. This fight earned him a $425,000 Performance of the Night award.

After Tom Aspinall vacated his title due to lingering medical complications, Gane was promoted to undisputed heavyweight champion. He made his first defense on November 14, 2026 at UFC 334 against Josh Hokit. Gane defeated Hokit by unanimous decision. This fight earned him a $100,000 Fight of the Night award.

== Fighting style ==
Gane is an orthodox heavyweight striker with a background in Muay Thai. At 6 ft 4 in with an 81 in reach, he uses unusually light footwork for the division, fighting mostly at long range behind jabs, feints, front kicks and round kicks to the leg, body and head.

His striking is generally based more on movement, volume and setups than on one-punch exchanges. He often uses small feints, stance adjustments and hand movement to draw reactions before attacking with his jab, low kicks, body kicks or lead-leg front kicks. Unlike many heavyweights, Gane rarely relies on extended boxing combinations in the pocket, instead preferring short entries, exits, angle changes and kicks to maintain distance.

In grappling exchanges, Gane has shown some offensive submission ability early in his MMA career, but his overall game is still primarily striking-oriented. His wrestling and defensive grappling have been viewed as the less developed parts of his style, especially when opponents are able to close distance, force clinches or hold top position.

== Filmography ==
Ciryl Gane stars as Bastien in the movie KO. He is also in the 2025 film Den of Thieves 2, starring O'Shea Jackson Jr. and Gerard Butler. In 2025, Gane served as an MMA judge on a French reality TV show broadcast by Netflix in 2026, l'Arène.

== Personal life ==
Gane and his wife have two daughters. They live in Nogent-sur-Marne, in the eastern suburbs of Paris.

== Championships and accomplishments ==
=== Muay Thai ===
- Académie Française de Muay Thai
  - AFMT National Title +91 kg (+201 lb) (One time)
    - One successful title defense

=== Mixed martial arts ===
- Ultimate Fighting Championship
  - UFC Heavyweight Champion (One time, current)
    - One successful title defense
    - First French fighter to become an undisputed UFC champion
  - Interim UFC Heavyweight Championship (Two times)
    - First French fighter to win an interim UFC title
    - Second ever UFC fighter to win an Interim Championship twice (after Justin Gaethje)
  - Fight of the Night (Two times) vs. Tai Tuivasa and Josh Hokit
  - Performance of the Night (Four times) vs. Don'Tale Mayes, Derrick Lewis, Serghei Spivac and Alex Pereira
  - Tied (Andrei Arlovski & Cain Velasquez) for second longest win streak in UFC Heavyweight division history (7)
  - Third most significant strikes landed in UFC Heavyweight division history (1220)
  - Second highest significant strike accuracy in UFC Heavyweight division history (63.0%) (behind Alistair Overeem)
  - Fourth highest striking differential in UFC Heavyweight division history (3.16)
  - UFC.com Awards
    - 2019: Ranked #2 Newcomer of the Year
    - 2021: Ranked #3 Fighter of the Year
    - 2022: Ranked #7 Fight of the Year vs. Tai Tuivasa
- TKO Major League MMA
  - TKO World Heavyweight Championship (One time)
    - Two successful title defenses
- Sherdog
  - 2021 Breakthrough Fighter of the Year
- MMA Sucka
  - 2021 Breakout Fighter of the Year
- UFC heavyweight bout records
  - Most significant strikes landed (237) (vs. Josh Hokit)
  - Most significant strikes attempted (343) (vs. Josh Hokit)
    - Second most total strikes attempted (412) (vs. Josh Hokit)
  - Most distance strikes landed (179) (vs. Josh Hokit)
  - Most significant head strikes landed (170) (vs. Josh Hokit)
    - Third most total head strikes landed (204) (vs. Josh Hokit)
  - Second most significant body strikes landed (63) (vs. Josh Hokit)
    - Third most total body strikes landed (90) (vs. Josh Hokit)
  - Most total leg strikes landed (71) (vs. Josh Hokit)
    - Tied (Tanner Boser) for second most leg kicks landed (46) (vs. Jairzinho Rozenstruik)
  - Second most total strikes landed (298) (vs. Josh Hokit)
  - Fourth most significant clinch strikes landed (58) (vs. Josh Hokit)

== Mixed martial arts record ==
Professional record breakdown
18 matches	15 wins	2 losses
By knockout	7	0
By submission	3	1
By decision	5	1
No contests	1	

Res.	Record	Opponent	Method	Event	Date	Round	Time	Location	Notes
Win	15–2 (1)	Josh Hokit	Decision (unanimous)	UFC 334	November 14, 2026	5	5:00	New York City, New York, United States	Defended the UFC Heavyweight Championship. Fight of the Night.
Win	14–2 (1)	Alex Pereira	TKO (punches)	UFC Freedom 250	June 14, 2026	2	1:27	Washington, D.C., United States	Won the interim UFC Heavyweight Championship. Performance of the Night. Promoted to undisputed champion on September 14, 2026.
NC	13–2 (1)	Tom Aspinall	NC (accidental eye poke)	UFC 321	October 25, 2025	1	4:35	Abu Dhabi, United Arab Emirates	For the UFC Heavyweight Championship. Accidental eye poke rendered Aspinall unable to continue.
Win	13–2	Alexander Volkov	Decision (split)	UFC 310	December 7, 2024	3	5:00	Las Vegas, Nevada, United States	
Win	12–2	Serghei Spivac	TKO (punches)	UFC Fight Night: Gane vs. Spivac	September 2, 2023	2	3:44	Paris, France	Performance of the Night.
Loss	11–2	Jon Jones	Submission (guillotine choke)	UFC 285	March 4, 2023	1	2:04	Las Vegas, Nevada, United States	For the vacant UFC Heavyweight Championship.
Win	11–1	Tai Tuivasa	KO (punches)	UFC Fight Night: Gane vs. Tuivasa	September 3, 2022	3	4:23	Paris, France	Fight of the Night.
Loss	10–1	Francis Ngannou	Decision (unanimous)	UFC 270	January 22, 2022	5	5:00	Anaheim, California, United States	For the UFC Heavyweight Championship.
Win	10–0	Derrick Lewis	TKO (punches)	UFC 265	August 7, 2021	3	4:11	Houston, Texas, United States	Won the interim UFC Heavyweight Championship. Performance of the Night.
Win	9–0	Alexander Volkov	Decision (unanimous)	UFC Fight Night: Gane vs. Volkov	June 26, 2021	5	5:00	Las Vegas, Nevada, United States	
Win	8–0	Jairzinho Rozenstruik	Decision (unanimous)	UFC Fight Night: Rozenstruik vs. Gane	February 27, 2021	5	5:00	Las Vegas, Nevada, United States	
Win	7–0	Junior dos Santos	TKO (elbow)	UFC 256	December 12, 2020	2	2:34	Las Vegas, Nevada, United States	
Win	6–0	Tanner Boser	Decision (unanimous)	UFC Fight Night: Edgar vs. The Korean Zombie	December 21, 2019	3	5:00	Busan, South Korea	
Win	5–0	Don'Tale Mayes	Submission (heel hook)	UFC Fight Night: Maia vs. Askren	October 26, 2019	3	4:46	Kallang, Singapore	Performance of the Night.
Win	4–0	Raphael Pessoa	Submission (arm-triangle choke)	UFC Fight Night: Shevchenko vs. Carmouche 2	August 10, 2019	1	4:12	Montevideo, Uruguay	
Win	3–0	Roggers Souza	TKO (punches)	TKO 48	May 24, 2019	1	4:26	Gatineau, Quebec, Canada	Defended the TKO Heavyweight Championship.
Win	2–0	Adam Dyczka	TKO (punches)	TKO 44	September 21, 2018	2	4:57	Québec City, Quebec, Canada	Defended the TKO Heavyweight Championship.
Win	1–0	Bobby Sullivan	Submission (guillotine choke)	TKO Fight Night 1	August 2, 2018	1	1:42	Montreal, Quebec, Canada	Heavyweight debut. Won the vacant TKO Heavyweight Championship.

== Pay-per-view bouts ==
No.	Event	Fight	Date	Venue	City	PPV Buys
1.	UFC 265	Lewis vs. Gane	August 7, 2021	Toyota Center	Houston, Texas, United States	Not Disclosed
2.	UFC 270	Ngannou vs. Gane	January 22, 2022	Honda Center	Anaheim, California, United States	Not Disclosed
3.	UFC 285	Jones vs. Gane	March 4, 2023	T-Mobile Arena	Las Vegas, Nevada, United States	Not Disclosed
4.	UFC 321	Aspinall vs. Gane	October 25, 2025	Etihad Arena	Abu Dhabi, United Arab Emirates	Not Disclosed

== Muay Thai record ==
Professional Muay Thai record
13 Wins (9 (T)KOs, 4 Decisions), 0 Losses, 0 Draws
Date	Result	Opponent	Event	Location	Method	Round	Time	Record
June 9, 2018	Win	(Cameroon) Daniel Lentie	La Nuit De l'Impact IV	Saintes, France	TKO	1	N/A	13–0
October 28, 2017	Win	(Belgium) Yassine Boughanem	Duel 2	Paris, France	Decision	3	3:00	12–0
May 27, 2017	Win	(France) Bangaly Keita	Warriors Night	Paris, France	TKO	3	N/A	11–0
April 22, 2017	Win	(France) Jonathan Gengoul	Muay Thai Spirit 5	Les Herbiers, France	KO	1	N/A	10–0
Defended the AFMT Muay thai National Title +201 lb (+91 kg)
March 18, 2017	Win	(France) Brice Guidon	La Nuit Des Titans	Tours, France	TKO	3	N/A	9–0
November 5, 2016	Win	(France) Samih Bachar	Gala des 5 Nations	Nanterre, France	Decision	3	3:00	8–0
June 4, 2016	Win	(France) Jérémy Jeanne	Hurricane Fighting 3	Châlons-en-Champagne, France	TKO	2	N/A	7–0
Won the AFMT Muay thai National Title +201 lb (+91 kg)
April 2, 2016	Win	(Tunisia) Imed Souissi	8^{e} Défi des Champions	(Tunisia) M’Saken, Tunisie	KO	1	N/A	6–0
December 10, 2015	Win	(France) Brandon Mobi	Paris Fight	Paris, France	Decision	3	3:00	5–0
October 31, 2015	Win	(France) Brandon Mobi	Show Thaï 13	Aubervilliers, France	Decision	3	3:00	4–0
May 8, 2015	Win	(France) Jonathan Gengoul	Show Thaï 12	Aubervilliers, France	KO	2	N/A	3–0
February 15, 2015	Win	(France) Yann Kouadja	Super Fight	Paris, France	KO	2	N/A	2–0
November 1, 2014	Win	(Republic of the Congo) Cyril Omahri	Show Thaï 10	Aubervilliers, France	KO	1	N/A	1–0
Legend: Win Loss Draw/No contest Notes; Source: muaythaitv.fr

== See also ==
- List of current UFC fighters
- List of male mixed martial artists

Achievements
Vacant Title last held by Fabrício Werdum	6th UFC Heavyweight Interim Champion; 7 August 2021 – 22 January 2022	Vacant Title next held by Tom Aspinall
Vacant Title last held by Tom Aspinall	8th UFC Heavyweight Interim Champion; 14 June 2026 – 14 September 2026	Vacant
Preceded by Tom Aspinall; Vacated	25th UFC Heavyweight Champion; 14 September 2026 – present Promoted	Incumbent
