= Nganou =

Nganou or Ngannou is a surname. Notable people with the surname include:

- Emmanuel Nganou Djoumessi (born 1957), Cameroonian politician and minister
- Francis Ngannou (born 1986), Cameroonian and French mixed martial artist and boxer
