= Jarjis Danho =

Syrian mixed martial arts fighter

- Born: Gewargis Danho; October 15, 1983 (age 43); Al-Malikiyah, Syrian Arab Republic
- Other names: Man Mountain
- Nationality: German
- Height: 6 ft 3 in (1.91 m)
- Weight: 265 lb (120 kg; 18.9 st)
- Division: Heavyweight
- Reach: 74 in (188 cm)
- Fighting out of: Bielefeld, Germany
- Team: Hammers Team (2010–2021)
- Years active: 2011–2021

Mixed martial arts record
- Total: 9
- Wins: 6
- By knockout: 5
- By submission: 1
- Losses: 1
- By decision: 1
- Draws: 1
- No contests: 1

Other information
- Mixed martial arts record from Sherdog

Jarjis Danho (born October 15, 1983) is a German professional mixed martial artist who competed in the Heavyweight division of the Ultimate Fighting Championship.

== Background ==
Danho is an Assyrian Orthodox Christian. His family fled to Germany from Al-Malikiyah, Syria in 1989. The family moved around Germany until they settled in Paderborn. Having a big stature already in his adolescent years, begun working in family businesses as a cook and a bouncer at the age of 14. Having a soccer and power-lifting background, Jarjis started boxing at the age of 27 and rapidly picked up mixed martial arts too.

== Mixed martial arts career ==
=== Early career ===
Briefly after starting the sport, Danho made his amateur debut in 2011 and won the bout via first-minute knockout, subsequently turning professional. In 2014, he fought in the MMA Championship "Desert Force." In 2015, he was considered the number one fighter in Germany in the over 120 kg weight class and signed a contract with the Ultimate Fighting Championship (UFC).

=== Ultimate Fighting Championship ===
In 2015, Danho was asked to replace Konstantin Erokhin to face Daniel Omielańczuk on short notice at UFC Fight Night: Bisping vs. Leites on July 18, 2015. However, his then-current organization Desert Force didn't allow him to sign with the UFC.

After his contract with Desert Force expired, Danho was able to sign with the UFC. The previously proposed matchup with Daniel Omielańczuk was rebooked to take place at UFC Fight Night: Silva vs. Bisping on February 27, 2016. He lost the bout via majority technical decision after being rendered unable to continue due to a groin punch.

Danho then faced Christian Colombo at UFC Fight Night 93 on September 3, 2016. The bout was declared a majority draw. Colombo was deducted one point in the first round after kneeing the downed Danho.

Danho was next scheduled to face Dmitry Poberezhets at UFC 211 on May 13, 2017. However, Danho pulled out of the fight citing an injury and was replaced by Chase Sherman.

After almost three-year absence from the octagon, Danho was scheduled to face Greg Hardy at UFC Fight Night 162 on October 26, 2019. Again, Danho was forced to withdraw from the bout due to an injury and was replaced by Ben Sosoli.

Danho was next scheduled to face Tai Tuivasa at UFC 251 but due to the COVID-19 pandemic, the event was moved to take place on June 6, 2020 in Abu Dhabi. Due to the change, the bout never took place.

Over four years removed from his previous bout, Danho returned to the UFC to face Yorgan De Castro at UFC on ABC: Vettori vs. Holland on April 10, 2021. He won the fight via knockout in the first round.

On October 10, 2024, after not competing for three years, it was reported that Danho was removed from the UFC roster.

== Mixed martial arts record ==
Professional record breakdown
9 matches	6 wins	1 loss
By knockout	5	0
By submission	1	0
By decision	0	1
Draws	1	
No contests	1	

Res.	Record	Opponent	Method	Event	Date	Round	Time	Location	Notes
Win	6–1–1 (1)	Yorgan De Castro	KO (punch)	UFC on ABC: Vettori vs. Holland	April 10, 2021	1	3:02	Las Vegas, Nevada, United States	
Draw	5–1–1 (1)	Christian Colombo	Draw (majority)	UFC Fight Night: Arlovski vs. Barnett	September 3, 2016	3	5:00	Hamburg, Germany	Colombo was deducted one point in round 1 due to an illegal knee.
Loss	5–1 (1)	Daniel Omielańczuk	Technical Decision (majority)	UFC Fight Night: Silva vs. Bisping	February 27, 2016	3	1:31	London, England	Accidental groin strike rendered Danho unable to continue.
Win	5–0 (1)	Stefan Traunmueller	TKO (punches)	Desert Force 17: Homecoming	May 25, 2015	1	4:07	Amman, Jordan	
Win	4–0 (1)	Marcus Vänttinen	TKO (punches)	Cage 29	Feb 28, 2015	3	3:22	Helsinki, Finland	
Win	3–0 (1)	Mohamed Abdel Karim	TKO (punches)	Desert Force 12: Jordan	April 28, 2014	1	2:20	Amman, Jordan	
NC	2–0 (1)	David Shvelidze	NC (timekeeping error)	Superior FC 13: First Defense	Jun 1, 2013	3	5:00	Amman, Jordan	For the SFC Heavyweight Championship.
Win	2–0	Igor Swonkin	Submission (strikes)	GMC 3: Cage Time	February 16, 2013	1	1:23	Herne, Germany	
Win	1–0	Jermaine Van Rooy	TKO (punches)	Respect FC 8	Sep 22, 2012	1	1:25	Wuppertal, Germany	Heavyweight debut.

=== Amateur mixed martial arts record ===
Res.	Record	Opponent	Method	Event	Date	Round	Time	Location	Notes
Win	1–0	Admir Bogucanin	Submission (slam and punches)	WOF: Tournament Round 1	Feb 12, 2011	1	0:10	Herne, Germany	

== See also ==
- List of male mixed martial artists
