= Olena Kolesnyk =

Ukrainian mixed martial arts fighter

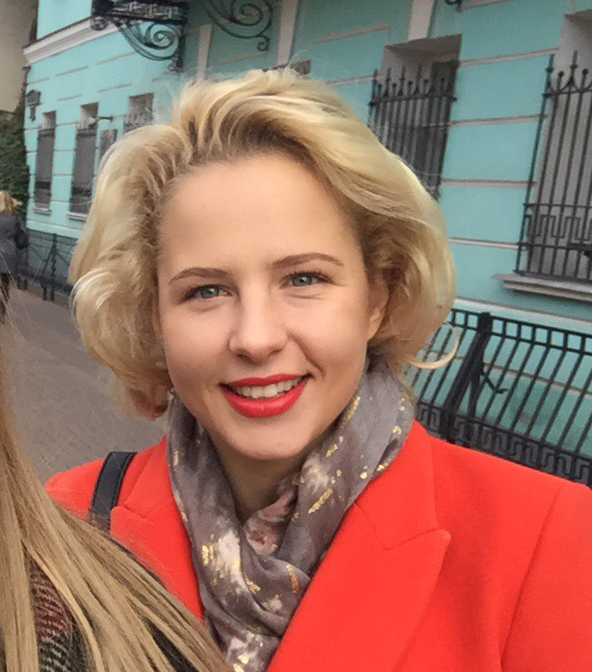
- Kolesnyk in November 2023
- Born: Olena Oleksandrivna Kolesnyk; 2 November 1990 (age 35); Odesa, Ukrainian SSR, Soviet Union
- Other names: Cannon
- Height: 5 ft 9 in (1.75 m)
- Weight: 147 lb (67 kg; 10 st 7 lb)
- Division: Featherweight
- Reach: 68 in (173 cm)
- Fighting out of: Odesa, Ukraine
- Team: Extreme Couture MMA Gym; Big Shot Boxing
- Years active: 2009–present

Mixed martial arts record
- Total: 16
- Wins: 9
- By knockout: 3
- By submission: 2
- By decision: 4
- Losses: 6
- By knockout: 3
- By submission: 2
- By decision: 1
- No contests: 1

Other information
- Mixed martial arts record from Sherdog

Olena Oleksandrivna Kolesnyk (Ukrainian: Олена Олександрівна Колесник; born 2 November 1990) is a Ukrainian mixed martial artist and former amateur boxer and kickboxer, who currently competes in the Featherweight division. A professional MMA fighter since 2014, she has formerly competed in the Invicta Fighting Championships, Bellator MMA, and Professional Fighters League (PFL). In July 2023, Kolesnyk reached No. 10 in World Women's Featherweight rankings according to Fight Matrix.

== Early martial arts career ==
Kolesnyk won the gold medal in the Ukrainian Boxing Championship in 2012 and 2014, as well as the silver medal in 2013. She also participated in the Ukrainian Boxing Cup, winning the gold medal in 2014 and the silver medal the following year. In Muay Thai, Kolesnyk became the Ukrainian champion in 2010 and won the Ukrainian Cup in 2010, 2011, and 2014. She also won a bronze medal at the IFMA World Muaythai Championships in 2015. In kickboxing, she was the WAKO World Cup Kickboxing Champion 2011.

== Mixed martial arts career ==
=== Early career ===
Kolesnyk started her professional MMA career in 2014 and amassed a record of 5–0 with one no contest prior to signing with Invicta. She made her WBK debut on 5 March 2016 in Ningbo, China, at WBK 11, winning by technical knockout in the first round. She fought Xiaoming Wang at WBK 15, winning the bout in the second round by neck crank.

=== Invicta Fighting Championships ===
Initially Kolesnyk was supposed to fight Megan Anderson for the Invicta title.

On July 15, 2017, in her Invicta debut, Kolesnyk faced Pam Sorenson at Invicta FC 24: Dudieva vs. Borella. She lost the bout by submission in round one.

Kolesnyk faced Felicia Spencer on July 21, 2018, at Invicta FC 30: Frey vs. Grusander. She lost the bout by submission via a rear-naked choke.

Kolesnyk was scheduled to face Faith McMah at Invicta FC 34: Porto vs. Gonzalez on February 15, 2019. However the bout was cancelled after she failed to make weight at 11 pounds over the featherweight limit.

=== Professional Fighters League ===
==== 2021 season ====
In her PFL debut, Kolesnyk faced Taylor Guardado at PFL 3 on May 6, 2021. She lost the bout by unanimous decision.

Kolesnyk faced Larissa Pacheco on June 25, 2021, at PFL 6. She lost the bout via knockout in the first round.

==== 2022 season ====
Kolesnyk faced Abigail Montes on May 6, 2022, at PFL 3. She won the bout via split decision.

Kolesnyk faced Vanessa Melo on July 1, 2022, at PFL 6. She won the bout via unanimous decision.

Kolesnyk faced Larissa Pacheco in the Semifinals of the Women's Lightweight tournament on August 20, 2022, at PFL 9. She lost the bout via first-round TKO stoppage.

==== 2023 season ====
Kolesnyk started off the 2023 PFL season against Aspen Ladd on April 7, 2023, at PFL 2. At weigh-ins, Kolesnyk came in at 146.4 lbs, .4 pounds over the limit for featherweight; she was fined 20% of her purse and was given a point deduction in the standings. Despite this, she won the bout by majority decision.

Kolesnyk faced Yoko Higashi on June 16, 2023, at PFL 5. She won the fight via unanimous decision.

In the semi-finals, Kolesnyk faced Larissa Pacheco for the third time on August 18, 2023, at PFL 8. At weigh-ins, Kolesnyk weighed in at 147.8 pounds, 1.8 pounds over the Featherweight limit. She was fined 20 percent of her purse, which went to Pacheco, and she started the bout with a one-point subtraction. Kolesnyk lost the fight via TKO in the first few seconds of the first round.

=== Bellator MMA ===
Kolesnyk was scheduled to face Sara Collins on June 22, 2024, at Bellator Champions Series 3. However, Kolesnyk withdrew in a late minute due to injury and the bout was cancelled.

== Mixed martial arts record ==
Professional record breakdown
16 matches	9 wins	6 losses
By knockout	3	3
By submission	2	2
By decision	4	1
No contests	1	

Res.	Record	Opponent	Method	Event	Date	Round	Time	Location	Notes
Loss	9–6 (1)	Larissa Pacheco	TKO (punches)	PFL 8 (2023)	August 18, 2023	1	0:14	New York City, New York, United States	2023 PFL Women's Featherweight Tournament Semifinal; Kolesnyk missed weight (147.8 lb).
Win	9–5 (1)	Yoko Higashi	Decision (unanimous)	PFL 5 (2023)	June 16, 2023	3	5:00	Atlanta, Georgia, United States	
Win	8–5 (1)	Aspen Ladd	Decision (majority)	PFL 2 (2023)	April 7, 2023	3	5:00	Las Vegas, Nevada, United States	Return to Featherweight; Kolesnyk missed weight (146.4 lb).
Loss	7–5 (1)	Larissa Pacheco	ТKO (punches)	PFL 9 (2022)	August 20, 2022	1	2:09	London, England	2022 PFL Women's Lightweight Tournament Semifinal.
Win	7–4 (1)	Vanessa Melo	Decision (unanimous)	PFL 6 (2022)	July 1, 2022	3	5.00	Atlanta, Georgia, United States	
Win	6–4 (1)	Abigail Montes	Decision (split)	PFL 3 (2022)	May 6, 2022	3	5.00	Arlington, Texas, United States	
Loss	5–4 (1)	Larissa Pacheco	KO (punch)	PFL 6 (2021)	May 25, 2021	1	4:48	Atlantic City, New Jersey, United States	
Loss	5–3 (1)	Taylor Guardado	Decision (unanimous)	PFL 3 (2021)	May 6, 2021	3	5:00	Atlantic City, New Jersey, United States	Lightweight debut.
Loss	5–2 (1)	Felicia Spencer	Submission (rear-naked choke)	Invicta FC 30	July 21, 2018	2	1:47	Kansas City, Missouri, United States	
Loss	5–1 (1)	Pam Sorenson	Submission (armbar)	Invicta FC 24	July 15, 2017	1	3:12	Kansas City, Missouri, United States	
Win	5–0 (1)	Tatiana Portnova	TKO (kicks to the body and knees)	Tech-Krep FC: Prime Selection 13	April 7, 2017	1	0:25	Nalchik, Russia	
Win	4–0 (1)	Liu Zhenlin	TKO (submission to punches)	WBK 19	September 10, 2016	1	0:25	Ningbo, China	
Win	3–0 (1)	Wang Xiaomin	Submission (neck crank)	WBK 15	June 9, 2016	2	0:43	Ningbo, China	
NC	2–0 (1)	Malihe Younes	NC (overturned by promoter)	WBK 12	March 26, 2016	3	5:00	Qingdao, China	
Win	2–0	Sun Jing	TKO (knees)	WBK 11	March 5, 2016	1	2:03	Ningbo, China	
Win	1–0	Yulia Drukteynite	TKO (punches)	Real Fight Promotion 19	October 24, 2014	1	0:48	Dubno, Ukraine	Featherweight debut.
