= Jailton Almeida =

Brazilian mixed martial artist (born 1991)

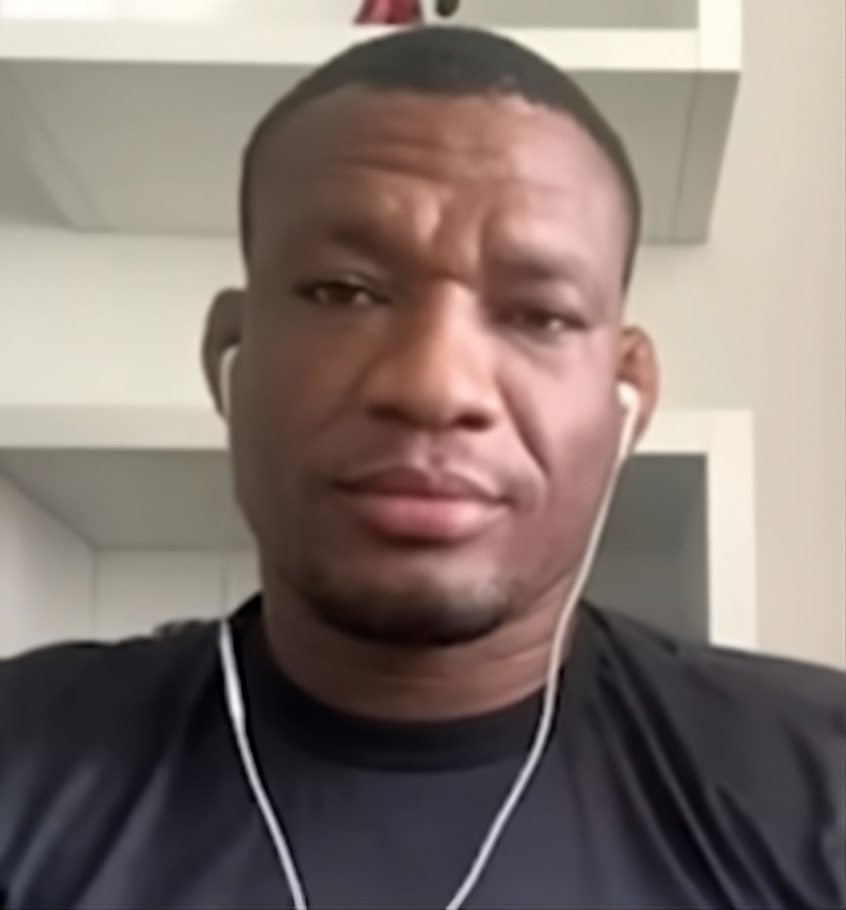
- Almeida in 2023
- Born: Jailton Jesus Almeida Júnior; 28 June 1991 (age 35); Salvador, Bahia, Brazil
- Other names: Malhadinho
- Height: 6 ft 4 in (193 cm)
- Weight: 237 lb (108 kg; 16 st 13 lb)
- Division: Welterweight (2012, 2016); Middleweight (2017–2018); Light Heavyweight (2019–2022, 2026-present); Heavyweight (2019, 2022-present)
- Reach: 79 in (201 cm)
- Stance: Orthodox
- Fighting out of: Salvador, Bahia, Brazil
- Team: LG System
- Rank: Black belt in Brazilian jiu-jitsu
- Years active: 2012–present

Mixed martial arts record
- Total: 28
- Wins: 22
- By knockout: 8
- By submission: 13
- By decision: 1
- Losses: 6
- By knockout: 2
- By decision: 4

Other information
- Mixed martial arts record from Sherdog

Jailton Jesus Almeida Júnior (born 28 June 1991) is a Brazilian professional mixed martial artist. He currently competes in the Heavyweight division of Absolute Championship Akhmat (ACA). Almeida most notably competed in the Light Heavyweight and Heavyweight divisions of the Ultimate Fighting Championship (UFC).

== Background ==
Almeida was born in the Brotas neighborhood of Salvador. Almeida's first dream was to be a football player, but his family's finances became an obstacle after he was required to acquire $10,000 real to join a club. He ended up following his father's footsteps into fighting, beginning by training boxing at the age of six, and starting Brazilian jiu-jitsu at 11. He eventually started training mixed martial arts as his jiu-jitsu training partners were training it. Financial difficulties also imposed themselves in martial arts, leading Almeida to work as a doorman and guard while his dream of being a fighter was put on hold.

He has 11 siblings; his older brother Alexandre disappeared one day after being involved with a criminal organization and was never seen again.

== Mixed martial arts career ==
=== Early career ===
To start his professional mixed martial arts career, Almeida racked a 13–2 record in Brazilian regional circuit.

=== Dana White's Contender Series ===
After claiming the Thunder Fight title, Almeida was invited to face Nasrudin Nasrudinov at Dana White's Contender Series 39 on September 14, 2021. He won the bout via second-round submission and was awarded a UFC contract.

=== Ultimate Fighting Championship ===
Almeida was scheduled to make his promotional debut against Danilo Marques on November 13, 2021, at UFC Fight Night 197. However Marques required surgery so the bout was rescheduled for February 5, 2022 at UFC Fight Night 200. Almeida won the fight via technical knockout in round one.

==== Move up to heavyweight ====
As his sophomore appearance in the organization, Almeida was scheduled to face Maxim Grishin on May 21, 2022, at UFC Fight Night 206. However, Grishin pulled out due to undisclosed reasons in late April. Almeida decided to move up to heavyweight to face Parker Porter. He won the fight via rear-naked choke in round one.

As the first bout of his new contract, Almeida was scheduled to face Shamil Abdurakhimov at UFC 279 on September 10, 2022. However, Abdurakhimov was forced to withdraw due to visa issues and was replaced by Anton Turkalj at a catchweight of 220 pounds. He dominated the bout, taking down Turkalj and submitting him at the end of the first round via rear-naked choke. He received his first Performance of the Night bonus award.

The bout against Shamil Abdurakhimov was rebooked for UFC 280 on October 22, 2022. With that date also falling through, the pair was re-booked for a third time at UFC 283. Almeida won the fight via technical knockout in the second round. With this win, he received the Performance of the Night award.

Almeida faced Jairzinho Rozenstruik on May 13, 2023, at UFC on ABC 4. He won the bout via rear naked choke in first round. This win earned him the Performance of the Night award.

Almeida was scheduled to face Curtis Blaydes on November 4, 2023, at UFC Fight Night 231. However, Blaydes withdrew for unknown reasons and was replaced by former UFC Heavyweight Championship challenger Derrick Lewis. Almeida won the fight via unanimous decision. He also registered 21:10 of ground control time, the record for a UFC heavyweight bout and fourth-most in UFC history. Almeida's performance and the fight were criticized by fans and fellow fighters for a lack of offense.

Almeida faced Curtis Blaydes on March 9, 2024, at UFC 299. After scoring multiple takedowns and controlling the first round with his grappling, Almeida lost the fight via knockout early in the second round.

Almeida was scheduled to face Alexander Volkov on June 1, 2024 at UFC 302. However, the bout was scrapped for unknown reasons and Volkov was booked for UFC on ABC 6 against Sergei Pavlovich. Almeida ended up facing Alexander Romanov instead. Almeida won the fight by a rear-naked choke submission in the first round.

Almeida faced Serghei Spivac on January 18, 2025 at UFC 311. He won the fight by technical knockout at the end of the first round. This fight earned him another Performance of the Night award.

Almeida faced Alexander Volkov on October 25, 2025, at UFC 321. He lost the fight by split decision.

Replacing Ryan Spann, who withdrew for undisclosed reasons, Almeida faced Rizvan Kuniev on February 7, 2026 at UFC Fight Night 266. He lost the fight by unanimous decision.

On February 11, 2026, it was reported that the UFC has parted ways with Almeida, after losing a lackluster decision to Kuniev.

=== Absolute Championship Akhmat ===
On February 21, 2026, it was reported that Almeida signed with Russian promotion Absolute Championship Akhmat.

== Championships and accomplishments ==
- Ultimate Fighting Championship
  - Performance of the Night (Four times) vs. Anton Turkalj, Shamil Abdurakhimov, Jairzinho Rozenstruik and Serghei Spivac
  - Fourth highest control time percentage in UFC history (69.9%)
    - Highest control time percentage in UFC Heavyweight division history (67.7%)
  - Third most top position time in UFC Heavyweight division history (51:51)
  - Highest top-position percentage in UFC history (63.7%)
    - Highest top-position percentage in UFC Heavyweight division history (61.6%)
  - Fourth fewest strikes absorbed-per-minute in UFC Heavyweight division history (2.22)
  - Fourth most takedowns landed in UFC Heavyweight division history (29)
  - Most ground control time in a UFC heavyweight bout (21:10) vs. Derrick Lewis
    - Fourth-most ground control time in a UFC bout (21:10) vs. Derrick Lewis
  - Most takedowns landed in a UFC Heavyweight round (9 in Round 1) vs. Curtis Blaydes
  - UFC.com Awards
    - 2022: Ranked #2 Newcomer of the Year
- Fight On MMA
  - FON Light Heavyweight Championship (one time)
- Thunder Fight
  - Thunder Fight Light Heavyweight Championship (one time)
- Cageside Press
  - 2022 Newcomer of the Year tied with Jack Della Maddalena
- MMA Junkie
  - 2023 Breakout Fighter of the Year
- MMA Fighting
  - 2022 Second Team MMA All-Star
  - 2023 Second Team MMA All-Star

== Mixed martial arts record ==
Professional record breakdown
28 matches	22 wins	6 losses
By knockout	8	2
By submission	13	0
By decision	1	4

Res.	Record	Opponent	Method	Event	Date	Round	Time	Location	Notes
Loss	22–6	Evgeniy Goncharov	Decision (unanimous)	ACA 207	September 12, 2026	3	5:00	Krasnodar, Russia	
Loss	22–5	Rizvan Kuniev	Decision (unanimous)	UFC Fight Night: Bautista vs. Oliveira	February 7, 2026	3	5:00	Las Vegas, Nevada, United States	
Loss	22–4	Alexander Volkov	Decision (split)	UFC 321	October 25, 2025	3	5:00	Abu Dhabi, United Arab Emirates	
Win	22–3	Serghei Spivac	TKO (punches)	UFC 311	January 18, 2025	1	4:53	Inglewood, California, United States	Performance of the Night.
Win	21–3	Alexander Romanov	Submission (rear-naked choke)	UFC 302	June 1, 2024	1	2:27	Newark, New Jersey, United States	
Loss	20–3	Curtis Blaydes	KO (punches)	UFC 299	March 9, 2024	2	0:36	Miami, Florida, United States	
Win	20–2	Derrick Lewis	Decision (unanimous)	UFC Fight Night: Almeida vs. Lewis	November 4, 2023	5	5:00	São Paulo, Brazil	
Win	19–2	Jairzinho Rozenstruik	Submission (rear-naked choke)	UFC on ABC: Rozenstruik vs. Almeida	May 13, 2023	1	3:43	Charlotte, North Carolina, United States	Performance of the Night.
Win	18–2	Shamil Abdurakhimov	TKO (punches)	UFC 283	January 21, 2023	2	2:56	Rio de Janeiro, Brazil	Performance of the Night.
Win	17–2	Anton Turkalj	Submission (rear-naked choke)	UFC 279	September 10, 2022	1	4:27	Las Vegas, Nevada, United States	Catchweight (220 lb) bout. Performance of the Night.
Win	16–2	Parker Porter	Submission (rear-naked choke)	UFC Fight Night: Holm vs. Vieira	May 21, 2022	1	4:35	Las Vegas, Nevada, United States	Return to Heavyweight.
Win	15–2	Danilo Marques	TKO (punches)	UFC Fight Night: Hermansson vs. Strickland	February 5, 2022	1	2:57	Las Vegas, Nevada, United States	
Win	14–2	Nasrudin Nasrudinov	Submission (rear-naked choke)	Dana White's Contender Series 39	September 14, 2021	2	1:49	Las Vegas, Nevada, United States	
Win	13–2	Edvaldo de Oliveira	Submission (rear-naked choke)	Thunder Fight 24	February 21, 2021	1	3:40	São Paulo, Brazil	Won the Thunder Fight Light Heavyweight Championship.
Win	12–2	Ildemar Alcântara	Submission (arm-triangle choke)	Thunder Fight 23	October 11, 2020	1	4:49	São Bernardo do Campo, Brazil	
Win	11–2	Leonardo Argemiro Vasconcelos Correa	TKO (punches)	Future FC 11	January 17, 2020	1	1:58	São Paulo, Brazil	
Win	10–2	Ednaldo Oliveira	Submission (arm-triangle choke)	Fight On 6	July 13, 2019	2	1:51	Salvador, Brazil	Light Heavyweight debut. Won the vacant FON Light Heavyweight Championship.
Win	9–2	Rian Tavares	TKO (punches)	Imperium MMA Pro 14	March 16, 2019	1	2:34	Feira de Santana, Brazil	
Win	8–2	Italo Nascimento	KO (punches)	Premier Fight League 20	February 23, 2019	1	2:05	Lauro de Freitas, Brazil	Heavyweight debut.
Win	7–2	Douglas Garcia	Submission (rear-naked choke)	JF Fight Evolution 19	October 20, 2018	1	2:30	Juiz de Fora, Brazil	
Win	6–2	David Allan	TKO (punches)	Fight On: Solidário	July 21, 2018	1	1:26	Salvador, Brazil	
Loss	5–2	Bruno Assis	Decision (unanimous)	Shooto Brazil 80	January 28, 2018	3	5:00	Rio de Janeiro, Brazil	
Win	5–1	Anderson Oliveira do Nascimento	Submission (rear-naked choke)	Fight On 5	September 23, 2017	1	4:16	Salvador, Brazil	
Loss	4–1	Tyago Moreira	KO (punch)	Katana Fight 3	August 5, 2017	1	0:16	Colombo, Brazil	
Win	4–0	Fagner Rakchal	TKO (punches)	Fight On 4	April 1, 2017	2	1:15	Salvador, Brazil	Middleweight debut.
Win	3–0	Roberto Bispo Silva	Submission (rear-naked choke)	Cross FC 2	January 16, 2016	2	1:30	Itabuna, Brazil	
Win	2–0	Leonardo Alves	Submission (rear-naked choke)	Conquista Kombat	November 17, 2012	1	0:49	Vitória da Conquista, Brazil	
Win	1–0	Diego Reis	Submission (rear-naked choke)	Nocaute MMA Fight 2	September 29, 2012	1	N/A	Eunápolis, Brazil	Welterweight debut.

== See also ==
- List of Dana White's Contender Series alumni
- List of male mixed martial artists
