= Marina Mokhnatkina =

Russian mixed martial arts (MMA) fighter

- Born: Marina Yuryvena Kormiltseva; May 12, 1988 (age 38); Perm, Perm Krai, Russian SFSR, Soviet Union
- Height: 5 ft 6 in (1.68 m)
- Weight: 145 lb (66 kg; 10.4 st)
- Division: Featherweight
- Reach: 65.5 in (166 cm)
- Style: Sambo
- Fighting out of: St. Petersburg, Russia
- Team: Sambo-Piter; Kill Cliff FC
- Years active: 2016–present

Mixed martial arts record
- Total: 15
- Wins: 11
- By knockout: 1
- By submission: 6
- By decision: 4
- Losses: 4
- By decision: 4

Other information
- Mixed martial arts record from Sherdog

Marina Yuryevna Mokhnatkina (Russian: Марина Юрьевна Мохнаткина; née Kormiltseva, born 12 May 1988) is a Russian sambo competitor and mixed martial artist. Mokhnatkina is a six-time world champion and two-time European champion in sambo. She is also an eight-time Russian champion in sambo. She previously competed in Bellator MMA and Professional Fighters League. (PFL).

She was previously married to sambist and mixed martial artist Mikhail Mokhnatkin. She is now married to UFC heavyweight Serghei Spivac.

== Mixed martial arts career ==
=== Bellator MMA ===
Marina made her Bellator debut against Janay Harding on March 29, 2019 at Bellator 219. She lost the bout via unanimous decision.

Marina was scheduled to face Jessica Borga on December 10, 2020 at Bellator 254. The bout was cancelled for unknown reasons.

Marina faced Amanda Bell on June 11, 2021 at Bellator 260. She won the bout via unanimous decision.

=== Professional Fighters League ===
On July 15, 2021, Marina announced that her contract with Bellator had expired and she signed with the PFL.

Marina was scheduled to face Kaitlin Young on August 19, 2021 at PFL 8. After Young was scratched from the bout, Marina was scheduled against Claudia Zamora. She won the fight by unanimous decision.

==== PFL season 2022 ====
Marina faced Kayla Harrison on May 6, 2022 at PFL 3. She lost the bout via unanimous decision.

Marina faced Abigail Montes on July 1, 2022 at PFL 6. She won the close bout via split decision.

Marina faced Tatiane Aguiar on December 3, 2022 at RCC 13, winning the bout via keylock submission in the third round.

==== 2023 Season ====
Marina started off the 2023 season against Yoko Higashi on April 7, 2023 at PFL 2. She won the fight via TKO in the second round.

Marina faced Evelyn Martins on June 16, 2023 at PFL 5. She won the fight via unanimous decision.

In the semi-finals, Mokhnatkina faced Amber Leibrock on August 18, 2023 at PFL 8. She won the fight via an armbar submission in the first round.

In the final, Mokhnatkina faced Larissa Pacheco on November 24, 2023 at PFL 10. She lost the fight by unanimous decision.

== Mixed martial arts record ==
Professional record breakdown
15 matches	11 wins	4 losses
By knockout	1	0
By submission	6	0
By decision	4	4

Res.	Record	Opponent	Method	Event	Date	Round	Time	Location	Notes
Loss	11–4	Larissa Pacheco	Decision (unanimous)	PFL 10 (2023)	November 24, 2023	5	5:00	Washington, D.C., United States	2023 PFL Women's Featherweight Tournament Final.
Win	11–3	Amber Leibrock	Submission (armbar)	PFL 8 (2023)	August 18, 2023	1	1:45	New York City, New York, United States	2023 PFL Women's Featherweight Tournament Semifinal.
Win	10–3	Evelyn Martins	Decision (unanimous)	PFL 5 (2023)	June 16, 2023	3	5:00	Atlanta, Georgia, United States	Catchweight (147 lb) bout; Martins missed weight.
Win	9–3	Yoko Higashi	TKO (punches)	PFL 2 (2023)	April 7, 2023	2	1:29	Las Vegas, Nevada, United States	
Win	8–3	Tatiane Aguiar	Submission (keylock)	RCC 13	December 3, 2022	3	4:00	Yekaterinburg, Russia	Return to Featherweight.
Win	7–3	Abigail Montes	Decision (split)	PFL 6 (2022)	July 1, 2022	3	5:00	Atlanta, Georgia, United States	
Loss	6–3	Kayla Harrison	Decision (unanimous)	PFL 3 (2022)	May 6, 2022	3	5:00	Arlington, Texas, United States	
Win	6–2	Claudia Zamora	Decision (unanimous)	PFL 8 (2021)	August 19, 2021	3	5:00	Hollywood, Florida, United States	Lightweight debut.
Win	5–2	Amanda Bell	Decision (unanimous)	Bellator 260	June 11, 2021	3	5:00	Uncasville, Connecticut, United States	
Loss	4–2	Janay Harding	Decision (unanimous)	Bellator 219	March 29, 2019	3	5:00	Temecula, California, United States	Featherweight debut.
Loss	4–1	Liana Jojua	Decision (majority)	Fight Nights Global 83	February 22, 2018	5	5:00	Moscow, Russia	For the inaugural FNG Women's Bantamweight Championship.
Win	4–0	Karine Silva	Submission (kneebar)	Fight Nights Global 81	December 15, 2017	1	0:58	Omsk, Russia	
Win	3–0	Irina Degtyareva	Submission (armbar)	Fight Nights Global 69	June 30, 2017	1	1:26	Novosibirsk, Russia	Bantamweight debut.
Win	2–0	Karina Vasilenko	Submission (achilles lock)	Fight Nights Global 53: Day 2	October 6, 2016	1	2:52	Moscow, Russia	Catchweight (141 lb) bout.
Win	1–0	Ekaterina Torbeeva	Submission (armbar)	Fight Nights Global 50	June 17, 2016	1	0:25	Saint Petersburg, Russia	Catchweight (141 lb) bout.
