= Danilo Marques =

Brazilian mixed martial arts fighter

- Born: Danilo Marques; December 26, 1985 (age 40); São Paulo, Brazil
- Height: 6 ft 6 in (1.98 m)
- Weight: 254 lb (115 kg; 18 st 2 lb)
- Division: Heavyweight
- Reach: 77 in (196 cm)
- Fighting out of: São Paulo, Brazil
- Team: Kings MMA
- Years active: 2014–present

Mixed martial arts record
- Total: 21
- Wins: 15
- By knockout: 4
- By submission: 7
- By decision: 4
- Losses: 6
- By knockout: 5
- By decision: 1

Other information
- Mixed martial arts record from Sherdog

Danilo Marques (born December 26, 1985) is a Brazilian mixed martial artist and sailor in the US Navy. Marques used to competed in the Heavyweight division of the Professional Fighters League (PFL) and in the Light Heavyweight division of the Ultimate Fighting Championship (UFC)

== Background ==
Marques began training in taekwondo at age 10 and boxing at 13. He competed as an amateur for several years before starting Brazilian Jiu-Jitsu (BJJ) at 18. Through boxing trainer Ivan de Oliveira, who has trained fighters such as Demian Maia and Maurício Rua, Marques began training in mixed martial arts (MMA) approximately eight years ago.

== Mixed martial arts career ==
=== Early career ===
Starting his professional career in 2014, Marques compiled a 9–2 record fighting on the Brazilian regional scene, winning the GCF Middleweight Championship in this process. Marques's lone bout outside of Brazil came on April 14, 2017 at LFA 9, where he faced Myron Dennis, losing the close bout via split decision.

=== Ultimate Fighting Championship ===
In his UFC debut, Marques faced Khadis Ibragimov on September 27, 2020 at UFC 253. He won the fight via unanimous decision.

Marques faced Mike Rodríguez on February 6, 2021 at UFC Fight Night: Overeem vs. Volkov. He won the fight via rear-naked choke in round two.

Marques was expected to face Ed Herman on June 26, 2021 at UFC Fight Night: Gane vs. Volkov. However, Herman was removed from the card due to undisclosed reasons on June 14 and replaced by Kennedy Nzechukwu. Marques controlled the first two rounds with his grappling, but ultimately lost the fight via TKO in round three.

Marques was scheduled to face Jailton Almeida on November 13, 2021 at UFC Fight Night 197. However Danilo required surgery so the bout was rescheduled for February 5, 2022 at UFC Fight Night 200. Marques lost the fight via technical knockout in round one.

On February 23, 2022, it was announced that Marques was no longer part of the UFC roster.

=== PFL ===
After picking up a triangle choke submission victory against Brock McKinney at Gladiator Challenge: Backyard Brawl, Marques moved up to Heavyweight and competed at PFL Challenger Series 11 on February 10, 2023 against Ras Hylton. He won the fight via a rear-naked choke submission.

In the 2023 PFL season, Marques faced Yorgan De Castro in the opening round on April 7, 2023 at PFL 2. He won the bout via unanimous decision.

Marques faced Marcelo Nunes on June 16, 2023 at PFL 5. He lost the fight via knockout in the first round.

Marques next competed against Satoshi Ishii at PFL 8 on August 18, 2023. He won the fight by unanimous decision.

Marques faced Timothy Johnson at PFL 4 on June 13, 2024. He lost the bout via TKO in the first round.

== Championships and accomplishments ==
=== Mixed martial arts ===
- Gladiator Combat Fight
  - GCF Vacant Middleweight Championship (One time)

== Mixed martial arts record ==
Professional record breakdown
21 matches	15 wins	6 losses
By knockout	4	5
By submission	7	0
By decision	4	1

Res.	Record	Opponent	Method	Event	Date	Round	Time	Location	Notes
Loss	15–6	Timothy Johnson	TKO (punches)	PFL 4 (2024)	June 13, 2024	1	3:14	Uncasville, Connecticut, United States	
Win	15–5	Satoshi Ishii	Decision (unanimous)	PFL 8 (2023)	August 18, 2023	3	5:00	New York City, New York, United States	
Loss	14–5	Marcelo Nunes	KO (punches)	PFL 5 (2023)	June 16, 2023	1	3:40	Atlanta, Georgia, United States	
Win	14–4	Yorgan De Castro	Decision (unanimous)	PFL 2 (2023)	April 7, 2023	3	5:00	Las Vegas, Nevada, United States	
Win	13–4	Ras Hylton	Submission (rear-naked choke)	PFL Challenger Series 11	February 10, 2023	2	2:33	Orlando, Florida, United States	Heavyweight debut.
Win	12–4	Brock McKinney	Submission (triangle choke)	Gladiator Challenge: Backyard Brawl	February 26, 2022	1	1:23	Valley Center, California, United States	
Loss	11–4	Jailton Almeida	TKO (punches)	UFC Fight Night: Hermansson vs. Strickland	February 5, 2022	1	2:57	Las Vegas, Nevada, United States	
Loss	11–3	Kennedy Nzechukwu	TKO (punches)	UFC Fight Night: Gane vs. Volkov	June 26, 2021	3	0:20	Las Vegas, Nevada, United States	
Win	11–2	Mike Rodríguez	Technical Submission (rear-naked choke)	UFC Fight Night: Overeem vs. Volkov	February 6, 2021	2	4:52	Las Vegas, Nevada, United States	
Win	10–2	Khadis Ibragimov	Decision (unanimous)	UFC 253	September 27, 2020	3	5:00	Abu Dhabi, United Arab Emirates	Return to Light Heavyweight.
Win	9–2	Cleiton Caetano	Decision (unanimous)	Gladiator Combat Fight 33	February 18, 2018	3	5:00	Curitiba, Brazil	Middleweight debut. Won the vacant GCF Middleweight Championship.
Win	8–2	Marck Polimeno	Submission (armbar)	Gladiator Combat Fight 31	July 6, 2017	1	N/A	Curitiba, Brazil	Catchweight (220 lb) bout.
Loss	7–2	Myron Dennis	Decision (split)	LFA 9	April 14, 2017	3	5:00	Shawnee, Oklahoma, United States	
Win	7–1	Junior Lourenço	Submission (rear-naked choke)	Curitiba Top Fight 10	February 24, 2017	2	4:42	Curitiba, Brazil	
Loss	6–1	Márcio Teles	KO (punch)	Thunder Fight 8	August 5, 2016	1	1:44	São Paulo, Brazil	
Win	6–0	Alisson Jorge	TKO (kick to the body and punches)	Shogun Team: Fight Day 1	October 24, 2015	1	1:43	Curitiba, Brazil	
Win	5–0	Marco Antonio Camargo	TKO (punches)	Predador FC 29	September 12, 2015	1	4:25	São José do Rio Preto, Brazil	
Win	4–0	Willian Elias Soares	TKO (submission to punches)	Predador FC 28	March 14, 2014	1	4:00	São José do Rio Preto, Brazil	
Win	3–0	Glauco Florencio	Submission	Evocke Fight: Gods Of War	December 13, 2014	1	1:00	Osasco, Brazil	
Win	2–0	Alex Junius	Submission (rear-naked choke)	Omega Challenger 1	August 17, 2014	1	1:40	São Paulo, Brazil	
Win	1–0	Matheus de Oliveira	TKO (punches)	Predador FC 26	March 29, 2014	1	2:02	São José do Rio Preto, Brazil	Light Heavyweight debut.

== See also ==
- List of male mixed martial artists
