= Renan Ferreira (fighter) =

Brazilian mixed martial arts fighter (born 1989)

- Born: Thalles Renan Ferreira; 23 November 1989 (age 36); Santa Tereza de Goiás, Goiás, Brazil
- Nickname: Problema
- Height: 6 ft 8 in (203 cm)
- Weight: 262 lb (119 kg; 18 st 10 lb)
- Division: Heavyweight
- Reach: 85 in (216 cm)
- Fighting out of: Rio de Janeiro, Brazil
- Team: Team Nogueira
- Years active: 2013–present

Mixed martial arts record
- Total: 22
- Wins: 13
- By knockout: 11
- By submission: 1
- By decision: 1
- Losses: 6
- By knockout: 3
- By submission: 2
- By disqualification: 1
- No contests: 3

Other information
- Mixed martial arts record from Sherdog

Thalles Renan Ferreira (born 23 November 1989) is a Brazilian professional mixed martial artist who competes in the Heavyweight division. He has previously competed for the Professional Fighters League (PFL), where he won the 2023 PFL Heavyweight Championship and in the Legacy Fighting Alliance (LFA).

== Background ==
Before pursuing a full-time career in fighting, Ferreira worked as a private security guard and construction worker. His journey into mixed martial arts began in 2013 when he trained in jiu-jitsu at a social project for low-income kids in Brasilia. Three years later, after moving to Rio de Janeiro, he left his previous jobs to focus exclusively on MMA.

Moving to Rio marked a significant turning point in his career, as he trained at the gym of MMA legends, the twins Big Nog and Lil Nog. At the gym, he interacted with former UFC stars as Jacare Souza and Junior dos Santos.

Additionally, Ferreira was invited to portray Werdum in a biographical film about jiu-jitsu legend Fernando Tererê, titled "O Faixa Preta."

== Mixed martial arts career ==
=== Early career ===
Ferreira started his professional MMA career in 2013, amassed a record of 5–1 before signing with the Legacy Fighting Alliance.

=== Legacy Fighting Alliance ===
In his LFA debut, Ferreira faced Brett Martin on June 28, 2019, at LFA 70. He lost the bout by disqualification as a result of illegal strikes.

Ferreira faced Jared Vanderaa on August 30, 2019, at LFA 74. He won the bout via triangle choke submission in the second round.

=== Professional Fighters League ===
==== 2021 season ====
Ferreira made his promotional debut against Fabrício Werdum on May 6, 2021, at PFL 3. He initially won the fight via technical knockout in the first round. However, the result was surrounded by controversy, as replays showed Ferreira tapping out while Werdum had him in a triangle choke before Ferreira finished Werdum. On May 10, the New Jersey State Athletic Control Board announced that Ferreira's TKO win against Werdum was overturned to a no contest due to his controversial stoppage.

Ferreira was then scheduled to face 2019 Professional Fighters League season Heavyweight Champion Ali Isaev on June 25, 2021, at PFL 6. However, Isaev was forced to withdraw from the event after not being medically cleared to compete and was replaced by PFL newcomer Stuart Austin. Austin was subsequently pulled from the bout for unknown reasons and replaced by returning PFL fighter, Carl Seumanutafa. Ferreira won the bout via unanimous decision.

==== 2022 season ====
Starting the 2022 season, Ferreira faced Jamelle Jones on April 28, 2022, at PFL 2. He won the bout by first-round knockout.

On June 24, 2022, Ferreira faced Klidson Abreu at PFL 5. He initially lost the bout by unanimous decision; however, the Georgia Athletic and Entertainment Commission later overturned the result to a no contest after Abreu failed a drug test for unspecified substances.

Ferreira then faced Ante Delija on August 13, 2022, at PFL 8, where he lost the bout by first-round TKO.

==== 2023 season ====
In the 2023 season, Ferreira started by going up against Rizvan Kuniev on April 7, 2023, at PFL 2. He initially lost the fight by unanimous decision, but the result was changed to a no contest when Kuniev failed a drug test.

Ferreira fought Matheus Scheffel on June 16, 2023, at PFL 5, winning the bout by first-round knockout.

In the semi-finals, Ferreira faced Maurice Greene on August 18, 2023, at PFL 8, winning the fight via knockout in the first round.

Heading into the finals of the heavyweight tournament, Ferreira faced Denis Goltsov on November 24, 2023, at PFL 10. He won the bout by second-round TKO, claiming the 2023 Heavyweight tournament title and the $1 million collective prize.

==== 2024 ====
Ferreira faced Bellator Heavyweight Champion Ryan Bader in a three-round non-title crossover fight on February 24, 2024, at PFL vs. Bellator. He won the bout by knockout just twenty-one seconds into the first round.

Ferreira fought former UFC Heavyweight Champion Francis Ngannou for the PFL Heavyweight Superfight Championship on October 19, 2024, at PFL Super Fights: Battle of the Giants. He lost the fight by knockout due to ground punches in the first round.

==== 2025 ====
Ferreira faced former Bellator Light Heavyweight Champion Vadim Nemkov for the vacant PFL Heavyweight Championship on December 13, 2025, at PFL Europe 4. He lost the fight via submission in the first round.

==== 2026 ====
Ferreira faced Sergey Bilostenniy on May 2, 2026, at PFL Sioux Falls. He lost the fight via technical knockout in round three.

== Championships and accomplishments ==
- Professional Fighters League
  - 2023 PFL World Heavyweight Championship Tournament
  - PFL vs. Bellator Champion of Champions World Heavyweight Superfight Championship (One time)

== Mixed martial arts record ==
Professional record breakdown
22 matches	13 wins	6 losses
By knockout	11	3
By submission	1	2
By decision	1	0
By disqualification	0	1
No contests	3	

Res.	Record	Opponent	Method	Event	Date	Round	Time	Location	Notes
Loss	13–6 (3)	Sergey Bilostenniy	TKO (punches)	PFL Sioux Falls: Storley vs. Zendeli	May 2, 2026	3	1:56	Sioux Falls, South Dakota, United States	
Loss	13–5 (3)	Vadim Nemkov	Submission (arm-triangle choke)	PFL Lyon: Nemkov vs. Ferreira	December 13, 2025	1	4:00	Décines-Charpieu, France	For the inaugural PFL Heavyweight Championship.
Loss	13–4 (3)	Francis Ngannou	KO (punches)	PFL Super Fights: Battle of the Giants	October 19, 2024	1	3:32	Riyadh, Saudi Arabia	For the PFL Super Fights Heavyweight Championship
Win	13–3 (3)	Ryan Bader	TKO (punches)	PFL vs. Bellator	February 24, 2024	1	0:21	Riyadh, Saudi Arabia	
Win	12–3 (3)	Denis Goltsov	TKO (punches)	PFL 10 (2023)	November 24, 2023	2	0:26	Washington, D.C., United States	Won the 2023 PFL Heavyweight Tournament.
Win	11–3 (3)	Maurice Greene	KO (punches)	PFL 8 (2023)	August 18, 2023	1	4:46	New York City, New York, United States	2023 PFL Heavyweight Tournament Semifinal.
Win	10–3 (3)	Matheus Scheffel	KO (punch)	PFL 5 (2023)	June 16, 2023	1	0:50	Atlanta, Georgia, United States	
NC	9–3 (3)	Rizvan Kuniev	NC (overturned)	PFL 2 (2023)	April 7, 2023	3	5:00	Las Vegas, Nevada, United States	Originally a unanimous decision win for Kuniev; overturned after he tested positive for banned substances.
Loss	9–3 (2)	Ante Delija	TKO (punches)	PFL 8 (2022)	August 13, 2022	1	4:31	Cardiff, Wales	2022 PFL Heavyweight Tournament Semifinal.
NC	9–2 (2)	Klidson Abreu	NC (overturned)	PFL 5 (2022)	24 June 2022	3	5:00	Atlanta, Georgia, United States	Originally a unanimous decision win for Abreu; overturned after he tested positive for banned substances.
Win	9–2 (1)	Jamelle Jones	KO (front kick and punches)	PFL 2 (2022)	April 28, 2022	1	0:25	Arlington, Texas, United States	
Win	8–2 (1)	Stuart Austin	KO (punch)	PFL 8 (2021)	August 19, 2021	1	0:31	Hollywood, Florida, United States	
Win	7–2 (1)	Carl Seumanutafa	Decision (unanimous)	PFL 6 (2021)	June 25, 2021	3	5:00	Atlantic City, New Jersey, United States	
NC	6–2 (1)	Fabrício Werdum	NC (overturned)	PFL 3 (2021)	6 May 2021	1	2:32	Atlantic City, New Jersey, United States	Originally a TKO (punches) win for Ferreira; later ruled a no contest after it was determined Ferreira tapped out to a triangle choke applied by Werdum.
Win	6–2	Jared Vanderaa	Submission (triangle choke)	LFA 74	August 30, 2019	2	2:37	Riverside, California, United States	
Loss	5–2	Brett Martin	DQ (illegal strikes)	LFA 70	June 28, 2019	1	3:14	Madison, Wisconsin, United States	LFA Heavyweight Tournament Semifinal.
Win	5–1	Fabrício Almeida	TKO (punches)	Future FC 3	March 22, 2019	2	3:57	Indaiatuba, Brazil	
Win	4–1	Tiago Cardoso	KO (punches)	New Corpore Extreme 30	September 15, 2018	1	1:39	Rio de Janeiro, Brazil	
Win	3–1	Carlos Ruan Pereira de Araújo	KO (punches)	Festival de Lutas da CUFA 6	December 14, 2017	1	3:30	Rio de Janeiro, Brazil	
Loss	2–1	Vinicius Moreira	Submission (armbar)	FAM Fight Night 1	September 3, 2016	1	3:37	Goiânia, Brazil	For the vacant FAMMA Heavyweight Championship.
Win	2–0	Alexandre Sabara	TKO (retirement)	Acai do Japa Fight 2	December 13, 2014	2	N/A	Paranoá, Brazil	
Win	1–0	Marcio Marques	TKO (punches)	MMA Fest: Porangatu	December 14, 2013	1	0:43	Porangatu, Brazil	Heavyweight debut.

== Pay-per-view bouts ==
No	Event	Fight	Date	Venue	City	PPV buys
1.	PFL vs. Bellator	Ferreira vs. Bader	February 24, 2024	Kingdom Arena	Riyadh, Saudi Arabia	Not Disclosed
2.	PFL Super Fights: Battle of the Giants	Ngannou vs. Ferreira	October 19, 2024	The Mayadeen	Riyadh, Saudi Arabia	Not Disclosed

== See also ==
- List of male mixed martial artists
