= Larissa Pacheco =

Brazilian mixed martial arts fighter (born 1994)

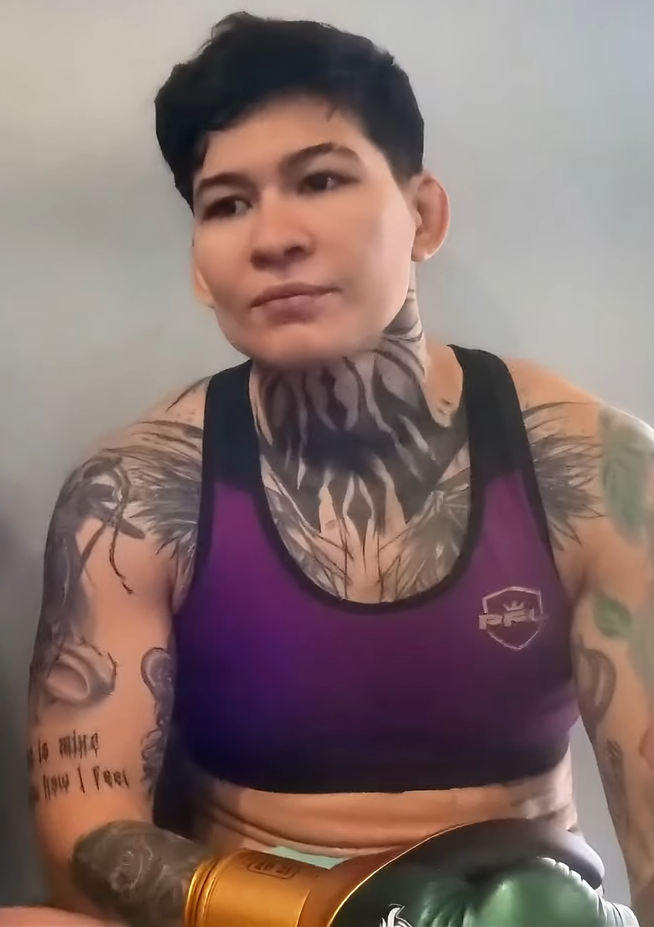
- Born: Larissa Moreira Pacheco; September 7, 1994 (age 32); Belém, Brazil
- Height: 5 ft 6 in (1.68 m)
- Weight: 146 lb (66 kg; 10 st 6 lb)
- Division: Lightweight (2019–2022); Featherweight (2012, 2018, 2023–present); Bantamweight (2012–2015)
- Reach: 69 in (175 cm)
- Fighting out of: Belem, Para, Brazil
- Team: Bulldog/Formiga Team
- Years active: 2012–present

Mixed martial arts record
- Total: 28
- Wins: 23
- By knockout: 11
- By submission: 8
- By decision: 4
- Losses: 5
- By knockout: 1
- By submission: 1
- By decision: 3

Other information
- Website: http://www.larissapacheco.com
- Mixed martial arts record from Sherdog

Larissa Moreira Pacheco (born September 7, 1994) is a Brazilian mixed martial artist who currently competes in the women’s Featherweight division. She previously fought in the Professional Fighters League (PFL), where she won the 2022 PFL Women's Lightweight Championship and 2023 PFL Women's Featherweight Championship.

== Mixed martial arts career ==
=== Early career ===
At the age of 15, Larissa found her love of martial arts when she began Muay Thai. Larissa began training on a daily basis, and a year later, she had her first amateur fight. Fighting 3 more times in 2012, in 2013, she fought 5 times, with Larissa entering Jungle Fight, and winning the Jungle Fight Women's Bantamweight Championship against Irene Aldana at Jungle Fight 63 .

=== Ultimate Fighting Championship ===
Pacheco made her UFC debut as an injury replacement for Valérie Létourneau, against Jéssica Andrade on September 13, 2014, at UFC Fight Night: Bigfoot vs. Arlovski. She lost the fight via submission in the first round.

Pacheco next faced future UFC Women's Featherweight Championship Germaine de Randamie at UFC 185 on March 14, 2015. She lost the fight via TKO in the second round, not before breaking her arm from a side kick from Germaine.

After suffering the broken arm, Larissa had to undergo a long recovery from the long-term damage and had to undergo 2 surgeries. She spent the next 3 years rehabilitating her arm, relocating to Rio de Janeiro where she taught Jiu Jitsu whilst planning her return to the MMA. During this time, Larissa was involved with Erica Paes social project that taught women self-defence and starred in popular Brazilian TV show A Força do Querer opposite famous actress Paolla Oliveira.

After this loss, she was released from the UFC.

=== Watch Out Combat Show ===
In 2018, Larissa was finally cleared to compete again, moving up to the Featherweight division and faced Karol Rosa at WOCS 49 in her first fight in 3 years. She won the bout in the second round via guillotine choke after having dominated the entire bout to become the first WOCS Female Featherweight champion.

=== The Ultimate Fighter ===
In August 2017, it was announced that Pacheco was one of the fighters featured on The Ultimate Fighter 28 UFC TV series.

Pacheco was the sixth pick of the featherweight fighters by coach Robert Whittaker. In the quarter-finals, she faced Macy Chiasson. She lost the fight via a technical knockout in round one.

=== Professional Fighters League ===
==== 2019 season ====
Pacheco made her PFL debut against Kayla Harrison on May 9, 2019 at PFL 1. Pacheco lost the fight by unanimous decision.

Pacheco next faced Bobbi Jo Dalziel at PFL 4 on July 11, 2019. She won the bout via first round armbar.

Making it to the semifinals, Pacheco faced UFC vet Sarah Kaufman at PFL 7 on October 11, 2019. She won the fight via unanimous decision.

Pacheco rematched with Kayla Harrison in the Women's Lightweight final at PFL 10 on December 31, 2019. After being dominating every round by Kayla's superior grappling, Pacheco lost the fight by unanimous decision.

==== 2021 season ====
Pacheco made her return to PFL against Julija Pajić at PFL 3 on May 6, 2021. She won the bout via TKO less than a minute into the bout after dropping Pajić in the first exchange.

Pacheco faced Olena Kolesnyk on June 25, 2021 at PFL 6. She won the bout via knockout in the first round.

Pacheco was scheduled to face Taylor Guardado in the Semifinals off the Women's Lightweight tournament on August 19, 2021 at PFL 8. At weigh-ins, she came in 2 pounds over the limit and was therefore removed from the tournament.

==== 2022 season ====
Pacheco faced Zamzagul Fayzallanova on May 6, 2022 at PFL 3. She won the bout via TKO stoppage in the first round.

Pacheco faced Genah Fabian on July 1, 2022 at PFL 6. She won the bout via TKO stoppage in the first round.

Pacheco faced Olena Kolesnyk in the Semifinals of the Women's Lightweight tournament on August 20, 2022 at PFL 9. She won the bout via first round TKO stoppage.

Pacheco faced Kayla Harrison for a third time in the finals of the Women's Lightweight tournament on November 25, 2022 at PFL 10. She won the fight via unanimous decision.

==== 2023 season ====
Pacheco started the 2023 season against Julia Budd on April 7, 2023 at PFL 2. She won the fight by unanimous decision.

Pacheco faced Amber Leibrock on June 16, 2023 at PFL 5. She won the fight via TKO in the first round.

In the semi-finals, Pacheco faced Olena Kolesnyk for the third time on August 18, 2023 at PFL 8. At weigh-ins, Kolesnyk weighed in at 147.8 pounds, 1.8 pounds over the Featherweight limit. She was fined 20 percent of her purse, which went to Pacheco, and she started the bout with a one point subtraction. Pacheco won the fight via TKO in the first few seconds of the first round.

In the final, Pacheco faced Marina Mokhnatkina on November 24, 2023 at PFL 10. She won the fight via unanimous decision to become the first two-division PFL champion in history.

==== 2024 ====
Pacheco faced reigning Bellator Women's Featherweight Champion Cris Cyborg on October 19, 2024 at PFL Super Fights: Battle of the Giants for the inaugural PFL Women's Featherweight Superfight Championship. She lost the fight by unanimous decision.

On October 23, 2025, PFL announced that they were releasing her from her contract.

== Championships and accomplishments ==
- Professional Fighters League
  - 2022 PFL Women's Lightweight Championship
  - 2023 PFL Women's Featherweight Championship
- Jungle Fight
  - Jungle Fight Women's Bantamweight Championship (One time)
    - One successful defense
- Watch Out Combat Show
  - WOCS Featherweight Championship (One time)
- ESPN
  - 2023 Non-UFC Female Fighter of the Year
- Sherdog
  - 2022 Upset of the Year vs. Kayla Harrison
- MMA Junkie
  - 2022 Upset of the Year vs. Kayla Harrison
- Cageside Press
  - 2022 Upset of the Year vs. Kayla Harrison
- MMA Fighting
  - 2022 First Team MMA All-Star
  - 2023 Second Team MMA All-Star

== Mixed martial arts record ==
Professional record breakdown
28 matches	23 wins	5 losses
By knockout	11	1
By submission	8	1
By decision	4	3

Res.	Record	Opponent	Method	Event	Date	Round	Time	Location	Notes
Loss	23–5	Cris Cyborg	Decision (unanimous)	PFL Super Fights: Battle of the Giants	October 19, 2024	5	5:00	Riyadh, Saudi Arabia	For the symbolic PFL Super Fights Women's Featherweight Championship.
Win	23–4	Marina Mokhnatkina	Decision (unanimous)	PFL 10 (2023)	November 24, 2023	5	5:00	Washington, D.C., United States	Won the 2023 PFL Women's Featherweight Tournament.
Win	22–4	Olena Kolesnyk	TKO (punches)	PFL 8 (2023)	August 18, 2023	1	0:14	New York City, New York, United States	2023 PFL Women's Featherweight Tournament Semifinal; Kolesnyk missed weight (147.8 lb).
Win	21–4	Amber Leibrock	TKO (punches)	PFL 5 (2023)	June 16, 2023	1	0:45	Atlanta, Georgia, United States	
Win	20–4	Julia Budd	Decision (unanimous)	PFL 2 (2023)	April 7, 2023	3	5:00	Las Vegas, Nevada, United States	Return to Featherweight.
Win	19–4	Kayla Harrison	Decision (unanimous)	PFL 10 (2022)	November 25, 2022	5	5:00	New York City, New York, United States	Won the 2022 PFL Women's Lightweight Tournament.
Win	18–4	Olena Kolesnyk	TKO (punches)	PFL 9 (2022)	August 20, 2022	1	2:09	London, England	2022 PFL Women's Lightweight Tournament Semifinal.
Win	17–4	Genah Fabian	TKO (punches)	PFL 6 (2022)	July 1, 2022	1	2:39	Atlanta, Georgia, United States	
Win	16–4	Zamzagul Fayzallanova	TKO (punches)	PFL 3 (2022)	May 6, 2022	1	1:25	Arlington, Texas, United States	
Win	15–4	Olena Kolesnyk	KO (punch)	PFL 6 (2021)	June 25, 2021	1	4:48	Atlantic City, New Jersey, United States	Catchweight (157.6 lb) bout; Kolesnyk missed weight.
Win	14–4	Julija Pajić	TKO (punches)	PFL 3 (2021)	May 6, 2021	1	0:51	Atlantic City, New Jersey, United States	
Loss	13–4	Kayla Harrison	Decision (unanimous)	PFL 10 (2019)	December 31, 2019	5	5:00	New York City, New York, United States	2019 PFL Women's Lightweight Tournament Final.
Win	13–3	Sarah Kaufman	Decision (unanimous)	PFL 7 (2019)	October 11, 2019	3	5:00	Las Vegas, Nevada, United States	2019 PFL Women's Lightweight Tournament Semifinal.
Win	12–3	Bobbi Jo Dalziel	Submission (armbar)	PFL 4 (2019)	July 11, 2019	1	2:31	Atlantic City, New Jersey, United States	
Loss	11–3	Kayla Harrison	Decision (unanimous)	PFL 1 (2019)	May 9, 2019	3	5:00	Uniondale, New York, United States	Lightweight debut.
Win	11–2	Karol Rosa	Submission (guillotine choke)	Watch Out Combat Show 49	March 24, 2018	2	2:59	Rio de Janeiro, Brazil	Won the vacant WOCS Featherweight Championship.
Loss	10–2	Germaine de Randamie	TKO (punches)	UFC 185	March 14, 2015	2	2:02	Dallas, Texas, United States	
Loss	10–1	Jéssica Andrade	Submission (guillotine choke)	UFC Fight Night: Bigfoot vs. Arlovski	September 13, 2014	1	4:33	Brasília, Brazil	
Win	10–0	Lizianne Silveira	Submission (triangle choke)	Jungle Fight 68	April 5, 2014	3	2:25	São Paulo, Brazil	Defended Jungle Fight Women's Bantamweight Championship.
Win	9–0	Irene Aldana	TKO (punches)	Jungle Fight 63	December 21, 2013	3	1:50	Belém, Brazil	Won the vacant Jungle Fight Women's Bantamweight Championship.
Win	8–0	Dinha Wollstaein	TKO (punches)	Jungle Fight 59	October 12, 2013	1	0:36	Rio de Janeiro, Brazil	
Win	7–0	Monique Bastos	Submission (keylock)	Extreme Kombat 7	August 17, 2013	1	2:58	Jacundá, Brazil	
Win	6–0	Marcia Silva	Submission (guillotine choke)	Gladiador Fight 3	May 24, 2013	2	1:50	Augusto Corrêa, Brazil	
Win	5–0	Edileusa Correa	Submission (triangle choke)	Marituba Total Combat 1	March 8, 2013	2	2:00	Marituba, Brazil	
Win	4–0	Thais Santana	TKO (retirement)	Ultimate Fight Imperatriz 3	August 18, 2012	1	2:00	Imperatriz, Brazil	
Win	3–0	Laura Goncalves Pacheco	Submission (anaconda choke)	Adrenalina Fight	August 18, 2012	1	1:30	Ananindeua, Brazil	Catchweight (130 lb) bout.
Win	2–0	Alenice Correa Costa	TKO (punches)	Ultimate Fight Tracuateua	August 6, 2012	1	1:27	Tracuateua, Brazil	Featherweight bout.
Win	1–0	Raquel Pitbull	Submission (armbar)	Marituba Fight	April 13, 2012	1	1:30	Marituba, Brazil	Bantamweight debut.

=== Mixed martial arts exhibition record ===
Exhibition record breakdown		
1 match	0 wins	1 loss
By knockout	0	1

Res.	Record	Opponent	Method	Event	Date	Round	Time	Location	Notes
Loss	0–1	Macy Chiasson	TKO (punches)	The Ultimate Fighter: Heavy Hitters	October 24, 2018 (airdate)	1	3:48	Las Vegas, Nevada, United States	The Ultimate Fighter 28 Women`s Featherweight quarter-final round.

== Karate Combat record ==
Professional record breakdown
1 match	1 win	0 losses
By knockout	1	0

Res.	Record	Opponent	Method	Event	Date	Round	Time	Location	Notes
Win	1–0	Julia Stasiuk	KO (punches and elbow)	Karate Combat 61	2026-05-02	2	2:40	Miami, Florida, USA	

== See also ==
- List of female mixed martial artists
- List of PFL champions
- Double champions in MMA
