= PFL 5 (2023) =

Mixed martial arts event

- The poster for PFL 5
- Promotion: Professional Fighters League
- Date: June 16, 2023
- Venue: Overtime Elite Arena
- City: Atlanta, Georgia, United States

Event chronology
PFL 4	PFL 5	PFL 6

PFL 5 was a mixed martial arts event produced by the Professional Fighters League that took place on June 16, 2023, at the Overtime Elite Arena in, Atlanta, Georgia, United States. This marked the fifth regular-season event of the tournament and included fights in the Heavyweight and Women's Featherweight divisions.

== Background ==
This event was headlined by returning 2022 Heavyweight Champion Ante Delija facing UFC veteran Maurice Greene and 2022 Women's Lightweight Champion Larissa Pacheco facing off against Bellator veteran Amber Leibrock in a featherweight bout.

Bruno Cappelozza and Rizvan Kuniev were scheduled to appear on this card. However, both fighters were suspended by the Nevada State Athletic Commission after failing drug tests. They were removed from the season and replaced by Patrick Brady and Jordan Heiderman.

== Results ==
Main card (ESPN / ESPN+)
Weight class				Method	Round	Time	Notes
Heavyweight	Ante Delija	def.	Maurice Greene	Decision (unanimous) (29–28, 29–28, 29–28)	3	5:00
Women's Featherweight	Larissa Pacheco	def.	Amber Leibrock	TKO (punches)	1	0:45
Heavyweight	Renan Ferreira	def.	Matheus Scheffel	KO (punch)	1	0:50
Lightweight	Biaggio Ali Walsh	def.	Travell Miller	KO (punches)	1	1:27	(Note: Amateur bout)
Women's Featherweight	Aspen Ladd	def.	Karolina Sobek	Submission (armbar)	2	4:57
Preliminary card (ESPN+)
Heavyweight	Denis Goltsov	def.	Yorgan De Castro	KO (punch)	1	0:18
Catchweight (147 lb)	Marina Mokhnatkina	def.	Evelyn Martins	Decision (unanimous) (30–27, 29–28, 29–28)	3	5:00
Heavyweight	Marcelo Nunes	def.	Danilo Marques	KO (punches)	1	3:40
Women's Featherweight	Julia Budd	def.	Martina Jindrová	Decision (unanimous) (29–28, 29–28, 29–28)	3	5:00
Women's Featherweight	Olena Kolesnyk	def.	Yoko Higashi	Decision (unanimous) (30–27, 30–27, 30–27)	3	5:00
Heavyweight	Jordan Heiderman	def.	Patrick Brady	TKO (knee injury)	1	2:26
Heavyweight	Isaiah Pinson	def.	Denzel Freeman	Decision (split) (28–29, 29–28, 29–28)	3	5:00

== Standings after event ==
The PFL points system is based on results of the match. The winner of a fight receives 3 points. If the fight ends in a draw, both fighters will receive 1 point. The bonus for winning a fight in the first, second, or third round is 3 points, 2 points, and 1 point respectively. The bonus for winning in the third round requires a fight be stopped before 4:59 of the third round. No bonus point will be awarded if a fighter wins via decision. For example, if a fighter wins a fight in the first round, then the fighter will receive 6 total points. A decision win will result in three total points. If a fighter misses weight, the opponent (should they comply with weight limits) will receive 3 points due to a walkover victory, regardless of winning or losing the bout; if the non-offending fighter subsequently wins with a stoppage, all bonus points will be awarded.

=== Heavyweight ===
Fighter	Wins	Draws	Losses	1st	2nd	3rd	Total Points (Note: The four fighters with most points advance to the playoffs)
♛ (Russia) Denis Goltsov	2	0	0	2	0	0	12
♛ (Brazil) Renan Ferreira	2	0	0	1	0	0	9 (Note: Received 3 points after PFL 2 result overturned)
♛ (Brazil) Marcelo Nunes	1	0	1	1	0	0	6
♛ (United States) Jordan Heiderman	1	0	0	1	0	0	6
(United States) Maurice Greene	1	0	1	0	1	0	5
(Brazil) Matheus Scheffel	1	0	1	0	0	0	3 (Note: Received 3 points after PFL 2 result overturned)
(Brazil) Danilo Marques	1	0	1	0	0	0	3
(Croatia) Ante Delija	1	0	0	0	0	0	3
(Cape Verde) Yorgan De Castro	0	0	2	0	0	0	0
(United States) Patrick Brady	0	0	1	0	0	0	0

=== Women's Featherweight ===
Fighter	Wins	Draws	Losses	1st	2nd	3rd	Total Points (Note: The four fighters with most points advance to the playoffs)
♛ (Brazil) Larissa Pacheco	2	0	0	1	0	0	9
♛ (Russia) Marina Mokhnatkina	2	0	0	0	1	0	8
♛ (United States) Amber Leibrock	1	0	1	1	0	0	6
♛ (Ukraine) Olena Kolesnyk	2	0	0	0	0	0	5
(United States) Aspen Ladd	1	0	1	0	1	0	5
(Canada) Julia Budd	1	0	1	0	0	0	3
(Brazil) Evelyn Martins	1	0	1	0	0	0	3
(Poland) Karolina Sobek	0	0	2	0	0	0	0
(Japan) Yoko Higashi	0	0	2	0	0	0	0
(Czech Republic) Martina Jindrová	0	0	2	0	0	0	0

== Reported payout ==
The following is the reported payout to the fighters as reported to the Georgia Athletic Commission. The amounts do not include sponsor money, discretionary bonuses, viewership points, or additional earnings.

- Ante Delija: $100,000 (includes $50,000 win bonus) def. Maurice Greene: $21,000
- Larissa Pacheco: $100,000 (includes $50,000 win bonus) def. Amber Leibrock: $11,000
- Renan Ferreira: $50,000 (includes $25,000 win bonus) def. Matheus Scheffel: $25,000
- Olena Kolesnyk: $40,000 (includes $20,000 win bonus) def. Yoko Higashi: $10,000
- Denis Goltsov: $100,000 (includes $50,000 win bonus) def. Yorgan De Castro: $50,000
- Aspen Ladd: $100,000 (includes $50,000 win bonus) def. Karolina Sobek: $8,000
- Marcelo Nunes: $30,000 (includes $15,000 win bonus) def. Danilo Marques: $11,000
- Julia Budd: $100,000 (includes $50,000 win bonus) def. Martina Jindrova: $24,000
- Marina Mokhnatkina: $44,000 (includes $22,000 win bonus) def. Evelyn Martins: $13,000
- Jordan Heiderman: $20,000 (includes $10,000 win bonus) def. Patrick Brady: $10,000
- Isaiah Pinson: $13,000 (includes $6,500 win bonus) def. Brandy Hester: $3,000
- Alexei Pergande: $12,000 (includes $6,000 win bonus) def. Denzel Freeman: $6,500

== See also ==
- List of PFL events
- List of current PFL fighters
