= UFC Fight Night: Hermansson vs. Strickland =

Mixed martial arts event in 2022

- The poster for UFC Fight Night: Hermansson vs. Strickland
- Promotion: Ultimate Fighting Championship
- Date: February 5, 2022
- Venue: UFC Apex
- City: Enterprise, Nevada, United States
- Attendance: Not announced

Event chronology
UFC 270: Ngannou vs. Gane	UFC Fight Night: Hermansson vs. Strickland	UFC 271: Adesanya vs. Whittaker 2

UFC Fight Night: Hermansson vs. Strickland (also known as UFC Fight Night 200, UFC on ESPN+ 58 and UFC Vegas 47) was a mixed martial arts (MMA) event produced by the Ultimate Fighting Championship that took place on February 5, 2022 at the UFC Apex facility in Enterprise, Nevada, part of the Las Vegas Metropolitan Area, United States.

== Background ==
A middleweight bout between Jack Hermansson and Sean Strickland served as the event headliner.

A light heavyweight bout between Danilo Marques and Jailton Almeida was scheduled for UFC Fight Night: Holloway vs. Rodríguez. However, the bout was rescheduled due to Marques getting injured, and was expected to take place at this event.

A flyweight bout between Malcolm Gordon and Denys Bondar was scheduled for UFC Fight Night: Vieira vs. Tate. However, Gordon withdrew from the event due to undisclosed reasons, and the pairing was rescheduled for this date.

Ian Heinisch was expected to face Sam Alvey in a middleweight bout. Heinisch pulled out due to undisclosed reasons in late December and was replaced by Phil Hawes. In turn, Hawes withdrew from the bout during fight week due to an undisclosed injury and was replaced by Brendan Allen, with the bout being moved up to light heavyweight.

At the weigh-ins, Steven Peterson weighed in at 149 pounds, 3 pounds over the featherweight non-title fight limit. His bout proceeded at a catchweight and he was fined 30% of his purse, which went to his opponent Julian Erosa.

== Results ==
Main card (ESPN+)
Weight class				Method	Round	Time	Notes
Middleweight	Sean Strickland	def.	Jack Hermansson	Decision (split) (49–46, 47–48, 49–46)	5	5:00
Middleweight	Nick Maximov	def.	Punahele Soriano	Decision (split) (28–29, 30–27, 29–28)	3	5:00
Welterweight	Shavkat Rakhmonov	def.	Carlston Harris	KO (spinning hook kick and punches)	1	4:10
Light Heavyweight	Brendan Allen	def.	Sam Alvey	Submission (rear-naked choke)	2	2:10
Middleweight	Bryan Battle	def.	Tresean Gore	Decision (unanimous) (29–28, 29–28, 29–28)	3	5:00
Catchweight (149 lb)	Julian Erosa	def.	Steven Peterson	Decision (split) (28–29, 29–28, 29–28)	3	5:00
Preliminary card (ESPN+)
Bantamweight	John Castañeda	def.	Miles Johns	Technical Submission (arm-triangle choke)	3	1:38
Featherweight	Hakeem Dawodu	def.	Michael Trizano	Decision (unanimous) (30–27, 30–27, 30–27)	3	5:00
Middleweight	Chidi Njokuani	def.	Marc-André Barriault	KO (punches)	1	0:16
Women's Bantamweight	Alexis Davis	def.	Julija Stoliarenko	Decision (unanimous) (29–27, 29–27, 30–27)	3	5:00
Light Heavyweight	Jailton Almeida	def.	Danilo Marques	TKO (punches)	1	2:57
Welterweight	Philip Rowe	def.	Jason Witt	TKO (punches)	2	2:15
Flyweight	Malcolm Gordon	def.	Denys Bondar	TKO (arm injury)	1	1:22

== Bonus awards ==
The following fighters received $50,000 bonuses.

- Fight of the Night: Julian Erosa vs. Steven Peterson^{1}
- Performance of the Night: Shavkat Rakhmonov and Chidi Njokuani

1. Peterson was disqualified for the Fight of the Night bonus due to missing weight. As a result, his award was given to Erosa.

== Aftermath ==
On April 19, it was reported that Miles Johns had tested positive for adderall in a urine test collected at the day of the event. As a result, he received a six-month suspension, along with a $3,450 fine, which amounted to 15 percent of his fight purse.

== See also ==
- List of UFC events
- List of current UFC fighters
- 2022 in UFC
