= Amber Leibrock =

American mixed martial arts (MMA) fighter

- Born: February 8, 1988 (age 38); Hayward, California, U.S.
- Other names: Touch 'em Up
- Height: 5 ft 11 in (1.80 m)
- Weight: 145 lb (66 kg; 10.4 st)
- Division: Featherweight
- Reach: 71 in (180 cm)

Mixed martial arts record
- Total: 13
- Wins: 7
- By knockout: 5
- By submission: 1
- By decision: 1
- Losses: 6
- By knockout: 4
- By submission: 2

Other information
- Mixed martial arts record from Sherdog

Amber Leibrock (born February 8, 1988) is an American female mixed martial artist who competes in the Featherweight division. She previously competed in Bellator MMA and Professional Fighters League (PFL).

== Mixed martial arts career ==
Leibrock gained entry into Invicta FC by defeating Paola Ramirez at Tuff-N-Uff: Xtreme Couture vs Syndicate MMA amateur tournament to win a pro contract with the organization.

=== Invicta FC ===
Leibrock began her pro debut by viciously knocking out highly touted Marina Shafir. Leibrock's next opponent was Megan Anderson who she lost to at Invicta FC 15: Cyborg vs. Ibragimova, before bouncing back with a win against Amy Coleman at Invicta FC 19: Maia vs. Modafferi.

=== Bellator MMA ===
Leibrock made her promotional debut against Janay Harding at Bellator 199 on May 12, 2018. She won the bout via unanimous decision.

Leibrock faced Arlene Blencowe on September 29, 2018, at Bellator at Bellator 206. She lost the fight via technical knockout in the third round.

Leibrock faced Amanda Bell on February 15, 2019, at Bellator 215, losing via TKO stoppage in the first round.

Leibrock faced Jessica Borga on September 7, 2019, at Bellator 226, losing via first round armbar submission.

=== Professional Fighters League ===
After winning all three of her bouts after her Bellator release, culminating will a first round rear-naked choke at Invicta FC 48, Leibrock signed with PFL, starting off the 2023 season against Martina Jindrová on April 7, 2023, at PFL 2. Leibrock won the fight via knockout in the first round after landing a head kick and finishing Martina with ground and pound.

Leibrock faced Larissa Pacheco on June 16, 2023, at PFL 5. She lost the fight via TKO in the first round.

In the semi-finals, Leibrock faced Marina Mokhnatkina on August 18, 2023, at PFL 8. She lost the fight via an armbar submission in the first round.

== Personal life ==
On September 16, 2023, Leibrock announced on her Instagram post that she had converted to Islam. She reportedly was contemplating at converting to the faith, after her fight with Larissa Pacheco. According to a report, Leibrock took her Shahada (declaration of faith) at Muslim Community Center, East Bay, California, United States.

== Mixed martial arts record ==
Professional record breakdown
13 matches	7 wins	6 losses
By knockout	5	4
By submission	1	2
By decision	1	0
No contests	0	

Res.	Record	Opponent	Method	Event	Date	Round	Time	Location	Notes
Loss	7–6	Marina Mokhnatkina	Submission (armbar)	PFL 8 (2023)	August 18, 2023	1	1:45	New York City, New York, United States	2023 PFL Women's Featherweight Tournament Semifinal.
Loss	7–5	Larissa Pacheco	TKO (punches)	PFL 5 (2023)	June 16, 2023	1	0:45	Atlanta, Georgia, United States	
Win	7–4	Martina Jindrová	KO (head kick and punches)	PFL 2 (2023)	April 7, 2023	1	2:19	Las Vegas, Nevada, United States	
Win	6–4	Morgan Frier	Submission (rear-naked choke)	Invicta FC 48	July 20, 2022	1	3:09	Denver, Colorado, United States	
Win	5–4	Devon Holmes	TKO (punches)	Gladiator Challenge: Underground III	December 4, 2021	1	0:20	Valley Center, California, United States	Won the GC Featherweight Championship.
Win	4–4	Meagan Marie	TKO (punches)	Gladiator Challenge: Best in the West	March 7, 2020	1	0:35	San Jacinto, California, United States	
Loss	3–4	Jessica Borga	Submission (armbar)	Bellator 226	September 7, 2019	1	4:45	San Jose, California, United States	
Loss	3–3	Amanda Bell	TKO (punches)	Bellator 215	February 15, 2019	1	3:52	Uncasville, Connecticut, United States	
Loss	3–2	Arlene Blencowe	TKO (slam and punches)	Bellator 206	September 29, 2018	3	1:23	San Jose, California, United States	
Win	3–1	Janay Harding	Decision (unanimous)	Bellator 199	May 12, 2018	3	5:00	San Jose, California, United States	
Win	2–1	Amy Coleman	TKO (knees and punches)	Invicta FC 19	September 23, 2016	1	3:15	Kansas City, Missouri, United States	
Loss	1–1	Megan Anderson	TKO (knees and punches)	Invicta FC 15	January 16, 2016	3	2:33	Costa Mesa, California, United States	Fight of the Night.
Win	1–0	Marina Shafir	TKO (punches)	Invicta FC 13	July 9, 2015	1	0:37	Las Vegas, Nevada, United States	Featherweight debut.
