= Yorgan De Castro =

Cape Verdean mixed martial arts fighter

- Born: December 19, 1987 (age 38); Mindelo, Cape Verde
- Other names: The Mad Titan
- Nationality: Cape Verdean and Portuguese
- Height: 6 ft 1 in (1.85 m)
- Weight: 265 lb (120 kg; 18 st 13 lb)
- Division: Heavyweight
- Reach: 74 in (188 cm)
- Fighting out of: Fall River, Massachusetts, United States
- Team: Regiment Training Center
- Years active: 2017–present

Mixed martial arts record
- Total: 19
- Wins: 12
- By knockout: 9
- By submission: 1
- By decision: 2
- Losses: 7
- By knockout: 4
- By decision: 3

Other information
- Mixed martial arts record from Sherdog

Yorgan De Castro (born December 19, 1987) is a Cape Verdean professional mixed martial artist who competes in the Heavyweight division. He is most notable for fighting in the Ultimate Fighting Championship (UFC) and of Professional Fighters League (PFL).

== Background ==
Castro was born and raised in the island of St. Vincent, Cape Verde. At 18 years old he moved to Portugal and started kickboxing training, making his official fighting debut only six months after. He dreamed of one day fighting in the big kickboxing promotions K-1 and Glory but never believed it would be possible in Portugal.

Later moving to the US to be with his family, his uncle convinced him to train at Lauzon MMA, owned by the current UFC Fighter Joe Lauzon, where he discovered MMA and started training.

== Mixed martial arts career ==
=== Early career ===
Starting his career in 2017, Castro compiled a 4–0 record fighting mainly for CES MMA. He was invited on Dana White's Contender Series 17 in order to compete for a UFC contract, which successfully gained through a TKO victory against Sanford Alton Meeks

=== Ultimate Fighting Championship ===
Castro made his UFC debut at UFC 243 on October 6, 2019, against Justin Tafa. He won the fight in the first round via knockout. This win earned him the Performance of the Night bonus as well.

Castro was initially scheduled to face Greg Hardy on March 28, 2020, at UFC on ESPN: Ngannou vs. Rozenstruik. Due to the COVID-19 pandemic, the event was eventually postponed . However, on April 9, Dana White, the president of UFC announced that this event was postponed and the bout eventually took place on May 9, 2020. Castro lost the fight via unanimous decision.

Castro was briefly linked to a heavyweight bout on October 4, 2020, with Ben Sosoli at UFC on ESPN: Holm vs. Aldana. However, Sosoli pulled out of the fight in late July citing an eye surgery and was replaced by Carlos Felipe. He lost the fight via unanimous decision.

Castro faced Jarjis Danho on April 10, 2021, at UFC on ABC 2. He lost the fight via knockout in the first round.

On April 30, 2021, it was revealed that Castro was no longer with the UFC.

=== Post UFC ===
Castro was scheduled to make his first appearance after his UFC release against Rakim Cleveland on August 6, 2021, at CES 63. However, Castro announced that he had withdrawn from the bout due to family issues.

Castro faced Danyelle Williams on November 7, 2021, at CES 65. He won the bout via unanimous decision.

=== Eagle Fighting Championship ===
Castro signed a multi-fight contract with Eagle Fighting Championship and debuted against Shaun Asher on January 28, 2022, at Eagle FC 44. He won the fight via guillotine choke in the first round.

Castro headlined against Junior dos Santos on May 20, 2022, at Eagle FC 47. Castro won the fight via TKO in the third round due to a doctor stoppage after dos Santos suffered a shoulder injury and was unable to continue.

=== Professional Fighters League ===
Castro signed with PFL for the 2023 season and was to face off against Ante Delija on April 7, 2023, at PFL 2. However, Delija pulled out due to injury and was replaced by Denis Goltsov. In turn, Goltsov withdrew from the bout and was replaced by Danilo Marques. Castro lost the bout by unanimous decision.

Castro faced Denis Goltsov on June 16, 2023, at PFL 5. Castro lost the bout by knockout just 18 seconds into the first round.

=== Post PFL ===
After winning two title bouts on the regional US scene, Castro faced Miran Fabjan in the main event of FNC 19 on September 7, 2024, losing the bout in the first round via ground and pound TKO.

Castro next fought Jahsua March in the main event of Cage Titans 68 on November 9, 2024 for the promotions Heavyweight title. He would win the fight via first round technical knockout thus becoming the Cage Titans Heavyweight champion, claiming his third Pro Heavyweight Belt in the New England region.

== Bare-knuckle boxing ==
Castro made his Bare Knuckle Fighting Championship debut against Bobby Brents on February 1, 2025 at BKFC on DAZN 4. He won the fight by technical knockout due to Brents receiving a hematoma at the end of the second round.

Castro faced Josh Watson on June 14, 2025 at BKFC Fight Night 26. He lost the fight by knockout in the first round.

== Personal life ==
Yorgan de Castro has stated that if he had to pick a hero, it would be Daniel Cormier due to his figure (short range and size) for the heavyweight division and unbelievable talent and determination. Yorgan is married and has a daughter born in 2014. In January 2026, Yorgan graduated from the Randolph MPTC Police Academy, becoming a Fall River Police Officer.

== Championships and accomplishments ==
=== Mixed martial arts ===
- Ultimate Fighting Championship
  - Performance of the Night (One time) vs. Justin Tafa
- Classic Entertainment & Sports MMA
  - CES MMA Heavyweight Championship (One time)
- New England Fights
  - NEF Heavyweight Championship (One time)
- Cage Titans
  - Cage Titans Heavyweight Championship (One time)

== Mixed martial arts record ==
Professional record breakdown
19 matches	12 wins	7 losses
By knockout	9	4
By submission	1	0
By decision	2	3

Res.	Record	Opponent	Method	Event	Date	Round	Time	Location	Notes
Loss	12–7	Ante Delija	TKO (punches)	FNC 22	April 12, 2025	1	0:41	Ljubljana, Slovenia	
Win	12–6	Jahsua Marsh	TKO (punches)	Cage Titans 68	November 9, 2024	1	4:58	Plymouth, Massachusetts, United States	Won the Cage Titans Heavyweight Championship.
Loss	11–6	Miran Fabjan	TKO (punches)	FNC 19	September 7, 2024	1	3:08	Pula, Croatia	For the FNC Heavyweight Championship.
Win	11–5	Alex Davidson	TKO (punches)	New England Fights 58	June 29, 2024	2	4:18	Lewiston, Maine, United States	Won the vacant NEF MMA Heavyweight Championship.
Win	10–5	Kevin Ray Sears	TKO (punches)	CES MMA 77	May 3, 2024	1	2:42	Ledyard, Connecticut, United States	Won the vacant CES MMA Heavyweight Championship.
Loss	9–5	Denis Goltsov	KO (punch)	PFL 5 (2023)	June 16, 2023	1	0:18	Atlanta, Georgia, United States	
Loss	9–4	Danilo Marques	Decision (unanimous)	PFL 2 (2023)	April 7, 2023	3	5:00	Las Vegas, Nevada, United States	
Win	9–3	Junior dos Santos	TKO (shoulder injury)	Eagle FC 47	May 20, 2022	3	0:33	Miami, Florida, United States	
Win	8–3	Shaun Asher	Submission (guillotine choke)	Eagle FC 44	January 28, 2022	1	1:04	Miami, Florida, United States	
Win	7–3	Danyelle Williams	Decision (unanimous)	CES MMA 65	November 7, 2021	3	5:00	Providence, Rhode Island, United States	
Loss	6–3	Jarjis Danho	KO (punch)	UFC on ABC: Vettori vs. Holland	April 10, 2021	1	3:02	Las Vegas, Nevada, United States	
Loss	6–2	Carlos Felipe	Decision (unanimous)	UFC on ESPN: Holm vs. Aldana	October 4, 2020	3	5:00	Abu Dhabi, United Arab Emirates	
Loss	6–1	Greg Hardy	Decision (unanimous)	UFC 249	May 9, 2020	3	5:00	Jacksonville, Florida, United States	
Win	6–0	Justin Tafa	KO (punch)	UFC 243	October 6, 2019	1	2:10	Melbourne, Australia	Performance of the Night.
Win	5–0	Sanford Alton Meeks	TKO (leg kick and punches)	Dana White's Contender Series 17	June 18, 2019	1	4:45	Las Vegas, Nevada, United States	
Win	4–0	Carlton Little Sr.	Decision (unanimous)	CES MMA 54	January 19, 2019	3	5:00	Lincoln, Rhode Island, United States	Heavyweight debut.
Win	3–0	Ras Hylton	KO (punch)	New England Fights 36	November 17, 2018	1	2:36	Portland, Maine, United States	Won the vacant NEF MMA Light Heavyweight Championship.
Win	2–0	David White	TKO (punches)	CES MMA 50	June 15, 2018	3	2:20	Lincoln, Rhode Island, United States	
Win	1–0	James Dysard	TKO (punches)	CES MMA 47	November 17, 2017	1	0:39	Lincoln, Rhode Island, United States	Light Heavyweight debut; Castro missed weight (208 lb).

== Bareknuckle boxing record ==
Professional record breakdown
2 matches	1 win	1 loss
By knockout	1	1

Res.	Record	Opponent	Method	Event	Date	Round	Time	Location	Notes
Loss	1–1	Josh Watson	KO	BKFC Fight Night Mohegan Sun: Porter vs. Cleckler	June 14, 2025	1	1:53	Uncasville, Connecticut, United States	
Win	1–0	Bobby Brents	TKO (hematoma)	BKFC on DAZN Mohegan Sun: Lane vs. VanCamp	February 1, 2025	2	2:00	Uncasville, Connecticut, United States	

== See also ==
- List of male mixed martial artists
