= Maurice Greene (fighter) =

American mixed martial arts fighter

- Born: Maurice Darnell Greene; July 5, 1986 (age 40); Norfolk, Virginia, U.S.
- Other names: The Crochet Boss
- Height: 6 ft 7 in (2.01 m)
- Weight: 264 lb (120 kg; 18 st 12 lb)
- Division: Heavyweight
- Reach: 82 in (208 cm)
- Style: Kickboxing
- Fighting out of: Albuquerque, New Mexico, U.S.
- Team: The Performance Compound (2013–present); Factory X (2019–2020); Jackson Wink MMA (2020–present)
- Trainer: Brock Larson
- Rank: Blue belt in Brazilian Jiu-Jitsu under Brock Larson
- Years active: 2012–present

Kickboxing record
- Total: 8
- Wins: 4
- By knockout: 2
- Losses: 4
- By knockout: 2

Mixed martial arts record
- Total: 21
- Wins: 12
- By knockout: 3
- By submission: 7
- By decision: 2
- Losses: 9
- By knockout: 3
- By submission: 1
- By decision: 5

Other information
- Mixed martial arts record from Sherdog

Maurice Darnell Greene (born July 5, 1986) is an American professional mixed martial artist who competes in the Heavyweight division. He appeared on The Ultimate Fighter 28 TV series. He has formerly competed in the Ultimate Fighting Championship (UFC) and Professional Fighters League (PFL).

== Background ==
Greene started training mixed martial arts in his early 20s to lose weight after hitting the scale at 330 pounds. He later moved from Chicago to St. Cloud, Minnesota and began training at START Brazilian Jiu-Jitsu Academy under Brock Larson where he started to compete in mixed martial arts (MMA).

== Kickboxing career ==
Greene competed for Glory kickboxing where he went 1 - 3 with one KO. Greene's overall record in kickboxing is 4 - 4 with two KO's.

== Mixed martial arts career ==
=== Early career ===
Greene started his professional MMA career since 2012 and amassed a record of 5–2 prior participated in The Ultimate Fighter 28 UFC TV mma competition series which he was subsequently signed by UFC after the show.

=== The Ultimate Fighter ===
In August 2017, it was announced that Greene was one of the fighters featured on The Ultimate Fighter 28 UFC TV series. Greene was the third pick of the heavyweight fighters by coach Kelvin Gastelum. In the quarter-finals, he faced Przemyslaw Mysiala and won the fight via knockout in the first round. In the semi-finals, Greene faced Juan Espino. and he lost the fight via a submission in round one.

=== Ultimate Fighting Championship ===
Greene made his UFC debut on November 20, 2018, against Michel Batista at The Ultimate Fighter 28 Finale. He won the fight via a submission in the first round.

His next fight came on March 9, 2019, replacing injured Daniel Spitz, a rematch against Jeff Hughes at UFC Fight Night: Lewis vs. dos Santos. He won the fight via a split decision.

Greene faced Júnior Albini on June 29, 2019, at UFC on ESPN: Ngannou vs. dos Santos. He won the fight via first-round technical knockout.

Greene faced Sergei Pavlovich on October 26, 2019, at UFC on ESPN+ 20. He lost the fight via technical knockout in the first round.

Greene faced Aleksei Oleinik on January 18, 2020, at UFC 246. He lost the fight via a submission in the second round.

Greene faced Gian Villante on June 27, 2020, at UFC on ESPN: Poirier vs. Hooker. He won the fight via an arm-triangle choke submission from the bottom in the third round.

Greene faced Greg Hardy on October 31, 2020, at UFC Fight Night 181. He lost the fight via technical knockout in round two.

Greene faced Marcos Rogério de Lima on May 8, 2021, at UFC on ESPN 24. He lost the fight via unanimous decision.

On May 11, Greene announced that he was released from the UFC.

=== Post-UFC; Professional Fighters League ===
Greene made his first appearance since leaving the UFC against Danyelle Williams at CES 68 on May 6, 2022. He won the bout via arm-triangle choke in the first round.

Greene faced Denis Goltsov on June 24, 2022, at PFL 5. He lost the bout via unanimous decision, getting out-wrestled throughout the bout.

==== 2023 Season ====
Greene started off the 2023 season against Marcelo Nunes on April 7, 2023, at PFL 2. He won the fight via TKO in the second round.

Greene faced Ante Delija on June 16, 2023, at PFL 5. He lost the bout via unanimous decision.

In the semi-finals, Greene replaced Marcelo Nunes, faced Renan Ferreira on August 18, 2023, at PFL 8. He lost the fight via knockout in the first round.

=== Gamebred Bareknuckle MMA ===
Greene was scheduled to face Guto Inocente at Gamebred Bareknuckle MMA 7 on March 2, 2024. However, the bout was cancelled for unknown reasons.

Greene faced Chase Sherman at Gamebred Bareknukcle MMA 8 on November 15, 2024, and won by a standing guillotine-choke submission.

== Personal life ==
Greene enjoys crocheting in his spare time, having learned to crochet in 2008. He sells his crocheted item under the name "The Crochet Boss" which is what his moniker was coined from.

Greene and his wife Kaiya have a son and a daughter.

== Mixed martial arts record ==
Professional record breakdown
21 matches	12 wins	9 losses
By knockout	3	3
By submission	7	1
By decision	2	5

Res.	Record	Opponent	Method	Event	Date	Round	Time	Location	Notes
Win	12–9	Chase Sherman	Submission (guillotine choke)	Gamebred Bareknuckle MMA 8	November 15, 2024	2	3:26	Biloxi, Mississippi, United States	Bare knuckle MMA.
Loss	11–9	Renan Ferreira	KO (punches)	PFL 8 (2023)	August 18, 2023	1	4:46	New York City, New York, United States	2023 PFL Heavyweight Tournament Semifinal.
Loss	11–8	Ante Delija	Decision (unanimous)	PFL 5 (2023)	June 16, 2023	3	5:00	Atlanta, Georgia, United States	
Win	11–7	Marcelo Nunes	TKO (knees and punches)	PFL 2 (2023)	April 7, 2023	2	1:20	Las Vegas, Nevada, United States	
Loss	10–7	Denis Goltsov	Decision (unanimous)	PFL 5 (2022)	June 24, 2022	3	5:00	Atlanta, Georgia, United States	
Win	10–6	Danyelle Williams	Technical Submission (arm-triangle choke)	CES 68	May 6, 2022	1	4:03	West Fargo, North Dakota, United States	
Loss	9–6	Marcos Rogério de Lima	Decision (unanimous)	UFC on ESPN: Rodriguez vs. Waterson	May 8, 2021	3	5:00	Las Vegas, Nevada, United States	
Loss	9–5	Greg Hardy	TKO (punches)	UFC Fight Night: Hall vs. Silva	October 31, 2020	2	1:12	Las Vegas, Nevada, United States	
Win	9–4	Gian Villante	Submission (arm-triangle choke)	UFC on ESPN: Poirier vs. Hooker	June 27, 2020	3	3:44	Las Vegas, Nevada, United States	
Loss	8–4	Aleksei Oleinik	Submission (armbar)	UFC 246	January 18, 2020	2	4:38	Las Vegas, Nevada, United States	
Loss	8–3	Sergei Pavlovich	TKO (punches)	UFC Fight Night: Maia vs. Askren	October 26, 2019	1	2:12	Kallang, Singapore	
Win	8–2	Júnior Albini	TKO (punches)	UFC on ESPN: Ngannou vs. dos Santos	June 29, 2019	1	3:38	Minneapolis, Minnesota, United States	
Win	7–2	Jeff Hughes	Decision (split)	UFC Fight Night: Lewis vs. dos Santos	March 9, 2019	3	5:00	Wichita, Kansas. United States	
Win	6–2	Michel Batista	Submission (triangle choke)	The Ultimate Fighter: Heavy Hitters Finale	November 30, 2018	1	2:14	Las Vegas, Nevada, United States	
Loss	5–2	Jeff Hughes	Decision (unanimous)	LFA 38	April 2, 2018	5	5:00	Minneapolis, Minnesota, United States	For the LFA Heavyweight Championship.
Win	5–1	Parnell Davis	Submission (arm-triangle choke)	Driller Promotions: No Mercy 6	September 30, 2017	1	1:20	Mahnomen, Minnesota, United States	Won the DP Heavyweight Championship.
Win	4–1	Jermaine McDermott	Submission (triangle choke)	LFA 19	August 18, 2017	1	3:06	Sioux Falls, South Dakota, United States	
Win	3–1	Zach Thumb	KO (head kick)	Legacy FC 60	October 7, 2016	1	0:25	Hinckley, Minnesota, United States	
Win	2–1	Kevin Asplund	Submission (triangle choke)	KOTC: Industrial Strength	November 22, 2014	1	1:57	Carlton, Minnesota, United States	
Loss	1–1	Dan Charles	Decision (unanimous)	Flawless FC 3	May 18, 2013	3	5:00	Inglewood, California, United States	
Win	1–0	Ed Carpenter	Decision (split)	Flawless FC 1	April 4, 2012	3	5:00	Chicago, Illinois, United States	Heavyweight debut.

=== Mixed martial arts exhibition record ===
Exhibition record breakdown		
2 matches	1 win	1 loss
By knockout	1	0
By submission	0	1

Res.	Record	Opponent	Method	Event	Date	Round	Time	Location	Notes
Loss	1–1	Juan Espino	Submission (rear-naked choke)	The Ultimate Fighter: Heavy Hitters	November 21, 2018 (airdate)	1	1:55	Las Vegas, Nevada, United States	The Ultimate Fighter 28 semi-final round.
Win	1–0	Przemysław Mysiala	KO (punch)	The Ultimate Fighter: Heavy Hitters	August 29, 2018 (airdate)	1	2:49	Las Vegas, Nevada, United States	The Ultimate Fighter 28 quarter-final round.

== Kickboxing record (incomplete) ==
Professional kickboxing record
4 wins, 4 loss
Date	Result	Opponent	Event	Location	Method	Round	Time	Record
2017-2-24	Loss	(Romania) Cătălin Moroșanu	Glory 38: Chicago	Hoffman Estates, Illinois, USA, US	TKO	2	0:23	1-3
2016-7-22	Loss	(United Kingdom) Chi Lewis Parry	Glory 32: Virginia	Norfolk, Virginia, USA	KO	2	2:30	1-2
2016-2-26	Loss	(Brazil) Anderson Silva	Glory 27: Chicago	Hoffman Estates, Illinois, USA	Decision (Unanimous)	3	3:00	1-1
2016-7-22	Win	(United States) Ashley Epps	Glory 21: San Diego	San Diego, California, USA	KO	1	2:11	1-0

== See also ==
- List of male mixed martial artists
