= PFL 8 (2021) =

Professional Fighters League mixed martial arts event in 2021

- The poster for PFL 8
- Promotion: Professional Fighters League
- Date: August 19, 2021
- Venue: Seminole Hard Rock Hotel & Casino Hollywood
- City: Hollywood, Florida, United States

Event chronology
PFL 7	PFL 8	PFL 9

The PFL 8 mixed martial arts event for the 2021 season of the Professional Fighters League was held on August 19, 2021. This was the second event for of the playoffs with the Heavyweight and Women's Lightweight divisions competing. This event aired on ESPN, with the prelims on ESPN+.

== Background ==
Kayla Harrison, the only two-time Olympic gold medalist in judo in the history of the United States, entered her second PFL playoffs unbeaten in 10 pro bouts. She faced Genah Fabian who held a 4-1 record and had won both of her PFL regular season bouts against Julija Pajic and Laura Sanchez to advance to the playoffs. This is the second time that Harrison and Fabian had been scheduled to fight in the PFL. They were set to meet in the 2019 semifinals in October of that year, but Fabian withdrew due to an illness after issues with her weight cut.

The other lightweight semifinal was expected to feature 2019 finalist Larissa Pacheco and former Invicta FC fighter Taylor Guardado. However, at the weigh-ins, Larissa Pacheco missed weight by 2 pounds and therefore was removed from the tournament and was replaced by 5th seeded Mariana Morais. Morais's original opponent, Claudia Zamora, instead faced Marina Mokhnatkina after Kaitlin Young, Marina's opponent, was removed from the card.

The heavyweight playoffs also began. Top seed Bruno Cappelozza took on Jamelle Jones, who qualified for the playoffs with a knockout of Klidson Abreu after stepping in as an alternate. Denis Goltsov and Ante Delija also met in the other heavyweight semifinal.

== Results ==
Main Card (ESPN)
Weight class				Method	Round	Time	Notes
Women's Lightweight	Kayla Harrison	def.	Genah Fabian	TKO (punches)	1	4:01
Heavyweight	Bruno Cappelozza	def.	Jamelle Jones	TKO (punches)	2	1:33
Women's Lightweight	Taylor Guardado	def.	Mariana Morais	Decision (split) (28-29, 29-28, 29-28)	3	5:00
Heavyweight	Ante Delija	def.	Denis Goltsov	Decision (unanimous) (29-28, 29-28, 29-28)	3	5:00
Preliminary card (ESPN+)
Heavyweight	Renan Ferreira	def.	Stuart Austin	KO (punch)	1	0:31
Heavyweight	Muhammed DeReese	def.	Carl Seumanutafa	Decision (unanimous) (29-28, 29-28, 30-27)	3	5:00
Women's Lightweight	Marina Mokhnatkina	def.	Claudia Zamora	Decision (unanimous) (30-27, 30-27, 30-27)	3	5:00
Women's Lightweight	Amanda Leve	def.	Miranda Barber	Submission (rear-naked choke)	1	4:18
Lightweight	Christian Lohsen	def.	Jonas Flok	Decision (unanimous) (29-28, 29-28, 29-28)	3	5:00

== 2021 PFL Heavyweight playoffs ==
Semifinals
1	(Brazil) Bruno Cappelozza	TKO
4	(United States) Jamelle Jones	2
2	(Russia) Denis Goltsov	3
3	(Croatia) Ante Delija	UD

Finals
1	(Brazil) Bruno Cappelozza	UD
3	(Croatia) Ante Delija	5

Legend
(SD)	(Split Decision)
(UD)	(Unanimous Decision)
(MD)	(Majority Decision)
SUB	Submission
(T)KO	(Technical) Knock Out
L	Loss

== 2021 PFL Women's Lightweight playoffs ==
Semifinals
5	(Brazil) Mariana Morais	3
4	(United States) Taylor Guardado	SD
2	(United States) Kayla Harrison	TKO
3	(New Zealand) Genah Fabian	1

Finals
4	(United States) Taylor Guardado	2
2	(United States) Kayla Harrison	SUB

* Larissa Pacheco was originally scheduled to face Taylor Guardado but was unable to continue in the tournament. She was replaced by #5 ranked Mariana Morais.

Legend
(SD)	(Split Decision)
(UD)	(Unanimous Decision)
(MD)	(Majority Decision)
SUB	Submission
(T)KO	(Technical) Knock Out
L	Loss

== See also ==
- List of PFL events
- List of current PFL fighters
