= Aspen Ladd =

American mixed martial artist

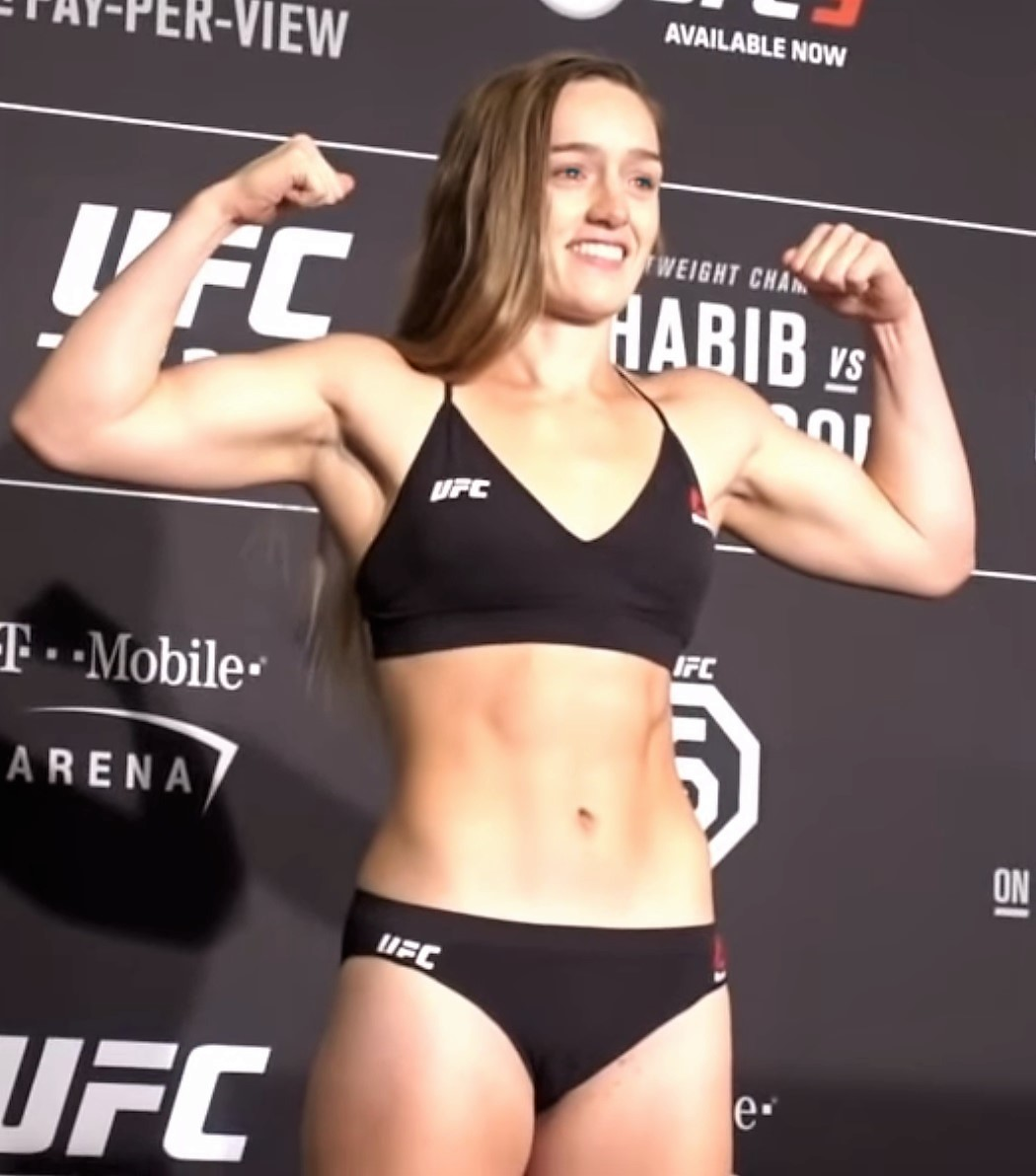
- Ladd poses after weigh-in at UFC 229 in 2018
- Born: March 1, 1995 (age 31); Folsom, California, U.S.
- Height: 5 ft 6 in (1.68 m)
- Weight: 145 lb (66 kg; 10.4 st)
- Division: Featherweight (2021–present); Bantamweight (2016–present); Flyweight (2013–2015)
- Reach: 66 in (168 cm)
- Team: MMAGOLD (2012–present)
- Rank: Purple belt in Brazilian Jiu-Jitsu
- Years active: 2015–present

Kickboxing record
- Total: 8
- Wins: 8

Mixed martial arts record
- Total: 17
- Wins: 12
- By knockout: 6
- By submission: 2
- By decision: 4
- Losses: 5
- By knockout: 1
- By decision: 4

Amateur record
- Total: 9
- Wins: 8
- By knockout: 2
- By submission: 4
- By decision: 2
- Losses: 1
- By decision: 1

Other information
- University: Folsom Lake College
- Mixed martial arts record from Sherdog

Aspen Ladd (born March 1, 1995) is an American professional mixed martial artist who is competing in the Featherweight division of Professional Fighters League (PFL). A professional since 2015, Ladd started her professional mixed martial arts career in Invicta FC before competing in the Ultimate Fighting Championship (UFC) in the Bantamweight division.

== Background ==
Ladd was born in Folsom, California and grew up in Pioneer, California with two younger brothers and three younger sisters. The younger of her brothers, Shealor, is also a mixed martial artist. After being homeschooled until then, Ladd briefly attended Folsom Lake College, but then terminated her studies to fully focus on her mixed martial arts career. Having previously danced ballet and run long-distance, she started training martial arts around the age of 14 and made her amateur debut right after turning 18.

== Mixed martial arts career ==
=== Invicta FC ===
Following an amateur run of 8–1, which included 6 finishes, Ladd signed with Invicta FC in late 2014.

Ladd was scheduled to make her professional debut against Kristi Lopez on February 27, 2015, at Invicta FC 11. However, Lopez suffered an injury in training and was replaced by decorated grappler Ana Carolina Vidal. Ladd won the fight via TKO in the first round.

Ladd next faced Amanda Cooper on September 12, 2015, at Invicta FC 14. She submitted Cooper with an armbar towards the end of the second round.

Ladd made her Bantamweight debut in a bout against Kelly McGill on March 11, 2016, at Invicta FC 16. She won the fight via TKO in third round.

Ladd faced Jessica Hoy on July 29, 2016, at Invicta FC 18. During the weigh ins, Ladd missed weight, coming in 2.1 lbs over the bantamweight limit. She elected not to cut any additional weight and was fined 25 percent of her purse, which went to her opponent. The bout proceeded at a catchweight of 138.1 lbs. She won the fight via TKO in the second round.

Ladd would make her final appearance for the promotion when she faced Sijara Eubanks on January 14, 2017, at Invcita FC 21. She won the fight via unanimous decision, marking the first time Ladd had failed to finish her opponent in her professional career.

=== Ultimate Fighting Championship ===
Ladd was scheduled to make her UFC debut against Jessica Eye on July 7, 2017, at The Ultimate Fighter 25 Finale. However, the day of the event Ladd fell ill and the bout was canceled.

Ladd eventually made her UFC debut against Lina Länsberg on October 22, 2017, at UFC Fight Night 118. She won the bout via TKO in the second round

Ladd was scheduled to face Leslie Smith on April 21, 2018, at UFC Fight Night 128. At the weigh-ins, Ladd weighed in at 137.8 lbs, 1.8 lbs over the bantamweight non-title fight upper limit of 136 lbs. Ladd offered Leslie an additional $5,000 on top of her 20% purse deduction. However, the fight was removed from the card after Smith refused to fight at catchweight.

Ladd next faced former Invicta FC Bantamweight Champion Tonya Evinger on October 6, 2018, at UFC 229. She won the fight via TKO in the first round. This win earned her the Performance of the Night award.

Ladd was scheduled to face Holly Holm on March 2, 2019, at UFC 235. However, on January 31, 2019, it was reported the fight would no longer take place at the event.

A rematch with Sijara Eubanks took place on May 18, 2019, at UFC Fight Night 152. She won the fight via unanimous decision. This fight earned her the Fight of the Night award.

Ladd faced Germaine de Randamie on July 13, 2019, at UFC Fight Night 155. At the weigh-ins for the event on July 12, Ladd attracted media attention for having a noticeably difficult weight cut which included her trembling on the scale and wincing in pain while weighing in and was described by a journalist covering the event as "[looking] like she was on the verge of a serious medical mishap." However, Ladd was cleared by the California State Athletic Commission to fight and hours later at the ceremonial weigh-ins she dismissed the seriousness of the situation by saying "I feel fantastic, now. I mean it’s always a little bit rough, that was particularly rough but I made it, I’m feeling good, and I’m ready for tomorrow." She lost the fight via technical knockout 16 seconds into round one, setting a women's bantamweight record and suffering her first professional loss. Despite initially accepting the loss in a post-fight interview, Ladd appealed it in October on the grounds of premature stoppage. However, the athletic commission voted 3–2 against the appeal, leaving the TKO loss intact.

Ladd's bantamweight license was suspended by California State Athletic Commission after gaining 18 percent of her weight between weigh-ins and fight day against Germaine de Randamie at UFC on ESPN+ 13. "Extensive medical documentation" is needed to clear suspension.

Ladd faced Yana Kunitskaya on December 7, 2019, at UFC on ESPN 7. She won the fight via technical knockout in round three.

Ladd was set to face Julianna Peña on March 28, 2020, at UFC on ESPN 8. However, Peña pulled out of the fight in early March citing an injury. In turn, promotion officials elected to remove Ladd from the card entirely, and the pairing was expected to be rescheduled at a future event. Instead Ladd was scheduled to face Sara McMann on June 27, 2020, at UFC on ESPN: Poirier vs. Hooker. However, Ladd suffered a training injury, tearing both her ACL and MCL and was forced to withdraw from the event.

Ladd was scheduled to face Macy Chiasson on July 24, 2021, at UFC on ESPN: Sandhagen vs. Dillashaw. However, the bout was scrapped due to Chiasson suffering an injury. The bout was rescheduled to UFC Fight Night 193 on October 2, 2021. At the weigh-ins, Ladd weighed in at 137 pounds, one pound over the bantamweight non-title limit; due to health concerns resulting from her weight cut, the bout against Chiasson was cancelled.

Ladd faced Norma Dumont, replacing injured Holly Holm, in a featherweight bout on October 16, 2021, at UFC Fight Night 195. She lost the fight via unanimous decision.

Ladd was scheduled to face Irene Aldana on April 9, 2022, at UFC 273. However, Aldana withdrew in late March for unknown reasons and was replaced by former UFC Women's Bantamweight Championship challenger Raquel Pennington. She lost the bout via unanimous decision.

Ladd was scheduled to face Sara McMann on August 13, 2022, at UFC on ESPN 41. However, Ladd was tested positive for COVID-19 and she was forced to withdraw from the event, and they were rescheduled for UFC Fight Night 210 on September 17. At the weigh-ins, Ladd weighed in at 138 pounds, two pounds over the bantamweight non-title fight limit. As a result the bout was scrapped.

After missing weight for the third time in her UFC career leading to a fight cancellation, Ladd was released from the UFC.

=== Professional Fighters League ===
After her UFC release, it was announced on October 4, 2022, that Ladd had signed with the Professional Fighters League and would compete in the featherweight division the next year.

Ladd faced Julia Budd on November 25, 2022, at PFL 10. She won her promotional debut via split decision.

==== 2023 Season ====
Ladd started off the 2023 PFL season against Olena Kolesnyk on April 7, 2023 at PFL 2. At weigh-ins, Kolesnyk came in at 146.4 lbs, .4 pounds over the limit for featherweight; she was fined 20% of her purse and was given a point deduction in the standings. Ladd lost via majority decision.

Ladd faced Karolina Sobek on June 16, 2023 at PFL 5. She won the fight via an armbar submission in the second round.

As a replacement for Julia Budd, Ladd faced Kayla Harrison on November 24, 2023, at PFL 10. She lost the bout by unanimous decision.

Ladd faced Ekaterina Shakalova on May 17, 2024, at Bellator Champions Series 2. She won the fight by unanimous decision.

=== Global Fight League ===
Ladd was scheduled to face Alejandra Lara in the inaugural Global Fight League event on May 24, 2025 at GFL 1. However, all GFL events were cancelled indefinitely.

== Bare-knuckle boxing ==
Ladd made her debut with Bare Knuckle Fighting Championship against Shyanna Bintliff on November 15, 2025 at BKFC 84. She won the fight by knockout at the end of the first round.

In 2026, she signed with BKB Bare Knuckle Boxing, and faced Bianca Daimoni on August 29 at BKB 58. She lost via unanimous decision.

== Personal life ==
Ladd is in a relationship with her MMA coach Jim West.

== Championships and accomplishments ==
- Ultimate Fighting Championship
  - Performance of the Night (One time) vs. Tonya Evinger
  - Fight of the Night (One time) vs. Sijara Eubanks

== Mixed martial arts record ==
Professional record breakdown
| 17 matches | 12 wins | 5 losses |
| By knockout | 6 | 1 |
| By submission | 2 | 0 |
| By decision | 4 | 4 |

| Res. | Record | Opponent | Method | Event | Date | Round | Time | Location | Notes |
|---|---|---|---|---|---|---|---|---|---|
| Win | 12–5 | Ekaterina Shakalova | Decision (unanimous) | Bellator Champions Series 2 | May 17, 2024 | 3 | 5:00 | Paris, France | |
| Loss | 11–5 | Kayla Harrison | Decision (unanimous) | PFL 10 (2023) | November 24, 2023 | 3 | 5:00 | Washington, D.C., United States | Catchweight (150 lb) bout. |
| Win | 11–4 | Karolina Sobek | Submission (armbar) | PFL 5 (2023) | June 16, 2023 | 2 | 4:57 | Atlanta, Georgia, United States | |
| Loss | 10–4 | Olena Kolesnyk | Decision (majority) | PFL 2 (2023) | April 7, 2023 | 3 | 5:00 | Las Vegas, Nevada, United States | Catchweight (146.4 lb) bout; Kolesnyk missed weight. |
| Win | 10–3 | Julia Budd | Decision (split) | PFL 10 (2022) | November 25, 2022 | 3 | 5:00 | New York City, New York, United States | |
| Loss | 9–3 | Raquel Pennington | Decision (unanimous) | UFC 273 | April 9, 2022 | 3 | 5:00 | Jacksonville, Florida, United States | Bantamweight bout. |
| Loss | 9–2 | Norma Dumont | Decision (unanimous) | UFC Fight Night: Ladd vs. Dumont | October 16, 2021 | 5 | 5:00 | Las Vegas, Nevada, United States | Featherweight debut. |
| Win | 9–1 | Yana Kunitskaya | TKO (punches) | UFC on ESPN: Overeem vs. Rozenstruik | December 7, 2019 | 3 | 0:33 | Washington, D.C., United States | |
| Loss | 8–1 | Germaine de Randamie | TKO (punch) | UFC Fight Night: de Randamie vs. Ladd | July 13, 2019 | 1 | 0:16 | Sacramento, California, United States | |
| Win | 8–0 | Sijara Eubanks | Decision (unanimous) | UFC Fight Night: dos Anjos vs. Lee | May 18, 2019 | 3 | 5:00 | Rochester, New York, United States | Fight of the Night. |
| Win | 7–0 | Tonya Evinger | TKO (punches) | UFC 229 | October 6, 2018 | 1 | 3:26 | Las Vegas, Nevada, United States | Performance of the Night. |
| Win | 6–0 | Lina Länsberg | TKO (punches) | UFC Fight Night: Cowboy vs. Till | October 21, 2017 | 2 | 2:33 | Gdańsk, Poland | |
| Win | 5–0 | Sijara Eubanks | Decision (unanimous) | Invicta FC 21: Anderson vs. Tweet | January 14, 2017 | 3 | 5:00 | Kansas City, Missouri, United States | |
| Win | 4–0 | Jessica Hoy | TKO (elbows and punches) | Invicta FC 18: Grasso vs. Esquibel | July 29, 2016 | 2 | 3:14 | Kansas City, Missouri, United States | Catchweight (138.1 lb) bout; Ladd missed weight. |
| Win | 3–0 | Kelly McGill | TKO (elbows and punches) | Invicta FC 16: Hamasaki vs. Brown | March 11, 2016 | 3 | 1:47 | Las Vegas, Nevada, United States | Bantamweight debut. |
| Win | 2–0 | Amanda Cooper | Submission (armbar) | Invicta FC 14: Evinger vs. Kianzad | September 12, 2015 | 2 | 4:42 | Kansas City, Missouri, United States | |
| Win | 1–0 | Ana Carolina Vidal | TKO (punches and elbows) | Invicta FC 11: Cyborg vs. Tweet | February 27, 2015 | 1 | 4:21 | Los Angeles, California, United States | Flyweight debut. |

== Amateur mixed martial arts record ==
| Amateur record breakdown | | |
| 9 matches | 8 wins | 1 loss |
| By knockout | 2 | 0 |
| By submission | 4 | 0 |
| By decision | 2 | 1 |

| Res. | Record | Opponent | Method | Event | Date | Round | Time | Location | Notes |
|---|---|---|---|---|---|---|---|---|---|
| Win | 8–1 | Roma Pawelek | Technical submission (guillotine choke) | Tuff-N-Uff - The Future Stars of MMA | August 1, 2014 | 1 | 2:45 | Las Vegas, Nevada, United States | Won the Tuff-N-Uff Women's Flyweight Championship. |
| Loss | 7–1 | Cynthia Calvillo | Decision (unanimous) | West Coast FC 9 | April 26, 2014 | 3 | 5:00 | McClellan, California, United States | Lost the West Coast FC Women's Flyweight Championship. |
| Win | 7–0 | Madeline Simmons Kidder | TKO (punches) | West Coast FC 8 | February 15, 2014 | 1 | 2:02 | Sacramento, California, United States | Won the West Coast FC Women's Flyweight Championship. |
| Win | 6–0 | Silvia Babaeghian | Decision (unanimous) | Ultimate Reno Combat 44 | October 5, 2013 | 3 | 5:00 | Reno, Nevada, United States | |
| Win | 5–0 | Leslie Rodriguez | Decision (unanimous) | West Coast FC 6 | August 3, 2013 | 3 | 5:00 | Placerville, California, United States | |
| Win | 4–0 | Veronica Carousos | Submission (armbar) | Ultimate Reno Combat 42 | July 20, 2013 | 1 | 0:25 | Reno, Nevada, United States | Won the Ultimate Reno Combat Women's Flyweight Championship. |
| Win | 3–0 | Karla Gonzalez-Santoyo | TKO (strikes) | Ultimate Reno Combat 41 | June 1, 2013 | 1 | 2:08 | Reno, Nevada, United States | |
| Win | 2–0 | Michelle Mix | Submission (armbar) | Ultimate Reno Combat 40 | April 13, 2013 | 1 | 1:08 | Reno, Nevada, United States | |
| Win | 1–0 | Jaimelene Nievera | Submission (Americana) | Montbleu Resort & WFC - MMA at the Lake | March 15, 2013 | 2 | 2:14 | Lake Tahoe, Nevada, United States | |

== Bare-knuckle boxing record ==
Professional record breakdown
| 2 matches | 1 win | 1 loss |
| By knockout | 1 | 0 |
| By decision | 0 | 1 |

| Res. | Record | Opponent | Method | Event | Date | Round | Time | Location | Notes |
|---|---|---|---|---|---|---|---|---|---|
| Loss | 1-1 | Bianca Daimoni | Decision (unanimous) | BKB 58 | August 29, 2026 | 5 | 2:00 | Miami, Florida, United States | |
| Win | 1–0 | Shyanna Bintliff | KO | BKFC 84 | November 15, 2025 | 1 | 1:59 | Thousand Palms, California, United States | |
