= PFL 2 (2023) =

Professional Fighters League MMA event in 2023

- The poster for PFL 2
- Promotion: Professional Fighters League
- Date: April 7, 2023
- Venue: The Theater at Virgin Hotels
- City: Paradise, Nevada, United States

Event chronology
PFL 1	PFL 2	PFL 3

The PFL 2 mixed martial arts event for the 2023 season of the Professional Fighters League was held on April 7, 2023, at The Theater at Virgin Hotels in Paradise, Nevada, United States. This marked the second regular-season event of the tournament and included fights in the Heavyweight and Women's Featherweight divisions.

== Background ==
Ante Delija was to headline the event in a bout against Yorgan De Castro in a heavyweight match-up. However, Delija pulled out due to injury and was replaced by Denis Goltsov. In turn, Goltsov withdrew from the bout and was replaced by Danilo Marques.

In the new women's featherweight division, Larissa Pacheco, who caused an upset in the 2022 finals by defeating two-time women's lightweight champion Kayla Harrison, will take on former Bellator MMA champion Julia Budd.

At weigh-ins, Kolesnyk came in at 146.4 lbs, .4 pounds over the limit for featherweight. She was fined 20% of her purse and was given a point deduction in the standings.

== Results ==
Main card (ESPN2 / ESPN+)
Weight class				Method	Round	Time	Notes
Women's Featherweight	Larissa Pacheco	def.	Julia Budd	Decision (unanimous) (30–27, 29–28, 30–27)	3	5:00
Heavyweight	Bruno Cappelozza	vs.	Matheus Scheffel	No Contest (overturned)	1	2:15	(Note: Originally a TKO (punches) win for Cappelozza; result overturned after Cappelozza failed a drug test.)
Catchweight (146.4 lb)	Olena Kolesnyk	def.	Aspen Ladd	Decision (majority) (28–28, 29–28, 29–28)	3	5:00
Lightweight	Biaggio Ali Walsh	def.	Isaiah Figueroa	TKO (punch)	1	1:42	(Note: Amateur Bout)
Preliminary Card (ESPN+)
Heavyweight	Rizvan Kuniev	vs.	Renan Ferreira	No Contest (overturned)	3	5:00	(Note: Originally a Decision (unanimous) win for Kuniev; result overturned after Kuniev failed a drug test.)
Heavyweight	Maurice Greene	def.	Marcelo Nunes	TKO (punches)	2	1:20
Heavyweight	Danilo Marques	def.	Yorgan De Castro	Decision (unanimous) (30–27, 30–27, 29–28)	3	5:00
Women's Featherweight	Amber Leibrock	def.	Martina Jindrová	KO (head kick and punches)	1	2:19
Women's Featherweight	Evelyn Martins	def.	Karolina Sobek	Decision (unanimous) (29–28, 29–28, 29–28)	3	5:00
Women's Featherweight	Marina Mokhnatkina	def.	Yoko Higashi	TKO (punches)	2	1:29

== Standings after event ==
The PFL points system is based on results of the match. The winner of a fight receives 3 points. If the fight ends in a draw, both fighters will receive 1 point. The bonus for winning a fight in the first, second, or third round is 3 points, 2 points, and 1 point respectively. The bonus for winning in the third round requires a fight be stopped before 4:59 of the third round. No bonus point will be awarded if a fighter wins via decision. For example, if a fighter wins a fight in the first round, then the fighter will receive 6 total points. A decision win will result in three total points. If a fighter misses weight, the opponent (should they comply with weight limits) will receive 3 points due to a walkover victory, regardless of winning or losing the bout; if the non-offending fighter subsequently wins with a stoppage, all bonus points will be awarded.

=== Heavyweight ===
Fighter	Wins	Draws	Losses	1st	2nd	3rd	Total Points (Note: The four fighters with most points advance to the playoffs)
(Russia) Denis Goltsov	1	0	0	1	0	0	6
(Brazil) Bruno Cappelozza	1	0	0	1	0	0	6
(United States) Maurice Greene	1	0	0	0	1	0	5
(Brazil) Danilo Marques	1	0	0	0	0	0	3
(Russia) Rizvan Kuniev	1	0	0	0	0	0	3
(Brazil) Cezar Ferreira	0	0	0	0	0	0	0
(Brazil) Renan Ferreira	0	0	1	0	0	0	0
(Cape Verde) Yorgan De Castro	0	0	1	0	0	0	0
(Brazil) Marcelo Nunes	0	0	1	0	0	0	0
(Brazil) Matheus Scheffel	0	0	1	0	0	0	0

=== Women's Featherweight ===
Fighter	Wins	Draws	Losses	1st	2nd	3rd	Total Points (Note: The four fighters with most points advance to the playoffs)
(United States) Amber Leibrock	1	0	0	1	0	0	6
(Russia) Marina Mokhnatkina	1	0	0	0	1	0	5
(Brazil) Larissa Pacheco	1	0	0	0	0	0	3
(Brazil) Evelyn Martins	1	0	0	0	0	0	3
(Ukraine) Olena Kolesnyk	1	0	0	0	0	0	2
(Canada) Julia Budd	0	0	1	0	0	0	0
(United States) Aspen Ladd	0	0	1	0	0	0	0
(Poland) Karolina Sobek	0	0	1	0	0	0	0
(Japan) Yoko Higashi	0	0	1	0	0	0	0
(Czech Republic) Martina Jindrová	0	0	1	0	0	0	0

== See also ==
- List of PFL events
- List of current PFL fighters
