= PFL 8 (2023) =

Mixed martial arts event

- The poster for PFL 8
- Promotion: Professional Fighters League
- Date: August 18, 2023
- Venue: The Theater at Madison Square Garden
- City: New York City, New York, United States

Event chronology
PFL 7	PFL 8	PFL 9

PFL 8 was a mixed martial arts event produced by the Professional Fighters League that took place on August 18, 2023, at The Theater at Madison Square Garden in New York City, New York, United States. This featured the semi-final playoffs for the Heavyweight and Women's Featherweight divisions.

== Background ==
The event was headlined by Renan Ferreira facing off against Maurice Greene in an attempt to reach the heavyweight finals. Ferreira was initially scheduled to face number three seed Marcelo Nunes, but he was forced to withdraw due to an injury and was replaced by fifth-seed Greene.

At weigh-ins, Olena Kolesnyk weighed in at 147.8 pounds, 1.8 pounds over the Featherweight limit. She was fined 20 percent of his purse, which went to her opponent Pacheco, and she started the bout with a one-point subtraction. Daiqwon Buckley weighed in at 272.4 pounds, 6.4 pounds over the Heavyweight limit, leading him to being fined 20% of his purse which went to his opponent Sutherland. The bout was briefly moved to Super Heavyweight before the promotion cancelled it. The New York State Athletic Commission decided not to license Chris Mixan, leading to his lightweight bout against Eddie George to be scrapped.

== Results ==
Main card (ESPN / ESPN+)
Weight class				Method	Round	Time	Notes
Heavyweight	Renan Ferreira	def.	Maurice Greene	KO (punches)	1	4:46	(Note: 2023 PFL Heavyweight Tournament Semifinal.)
Women's Featherweight	Larissa Pacheco	def.	Olena Kolesnyk	TKO (punches)	1	0:14	(Note: 2023 PFL Women's Featherweight Tournament Semifinal. Kolesnyk missed weight (147.8 lbs))
Heavyweight	Denis Goltsov	def.	Jordan Heiderman	Submission (arm-triangle choke)	1	4:16	(Note: 2023 PFL Women's Featherweight Tournament Semifinal.)
Women's Featherweight	Marina Mokhnatkina	def.	Amber Leibrock	Submission (armbar)	1	1:45	(Note: 2023 PFL Heavyweight Tournament Semifinal.)
Featherweight	Nathan Kelly	def.	Damion Nelson	Decision (unanimous) (30–27, 30–27, 29–28)	3	5:00
Preliminary card (ESPN+)
Heavyweight	Danilo Marques	def.	Satoshi Ishii	Decision (unanimous) (29–28, 29–28, 29–28)	3	5:00
Women's Flyweight	Maíra Mazar	def.	Kaytlin Neil	Decision (split) (28–29, 29–28, 29–28)	3	5:00

== Playoff brackets ==
=== 2023 PFL Heavyweight playoffs ===
Semifinals
1	(Russia) Denis Goltsov	SUB
4	(United States) Jordan Heiderman	1
2	(Brazil) Renan Ferreira	KO
5	(United States) Maurice Greene	1

Finals
1	(Russia) Denis Goltsov
2	(Brazil) Renan Ferreira

=== 2023 PFL Women's Featherweight playoffs ===
Semifinals
1	(Brazil) Larissa Pacheco	TKO
4	(Ukraine) Olena Kolesnyk	1
2	(Russia) Marina Mokhnatkina	SUB
3	(United States) Amber Leibrock	1

Finals
1	(Brazil) Larissa Pacheco
2	(Russia) Marina Mokhnatkina

Legend
(SD)	(Split Decision)
(UD)	(Unanimous Decision)
(MD)	(Majority Decision)
SUB	Submission
(T)KO	(Technical) Knock Out
L	Loss

== See also ==
- List of PFL events
- List of current PFL fighters
