= Ante Delija =

Croatian mixed martial arts fighter

- Born: 7 August 1990 (age 36); Dubrovnik, Croatia
- Nickname: Walking Trouble
- Height: 6 ft 3 in (1.91 m)
- Weight: 244 lb (111 kg; 17 st 6 lb)
- Division: Heavyweight
- Reach: 78 in (198 cm)
- Fighting out of: Dubrovnik, Croatia
- Team: Gladiator Croatia, Cro Cop Team
- Years active: 2011–present

Mixed martial arts record
- Total: 33
- Wins: 26
- By knockout: 13
- By submission: 6
- By decision: 7
- Losses: 7
- By knockout: 4
- By submission: 2
- By decision: 2

Other information
- Mixed martial arts record from Sherdog

Ante Delija (born August 7, 1990) is a Croatian professional mixed martial artist who currently competes in the heavyweight division of the Ultimate Fighting Championship. A professional since 2011, Delija has fought in the Professional Fighters League (PFL), where he was the 2022 PFL Heavyweight Champion, as well as other organizations such as M-1 Global, Rizin Fighting Federation, and Konfrontacja Sztuk Walki (KSW).

== Mixed martial arts career ==
=== M-1 Global ===
On February 28, 2014, Delija made his M-1 Global debut in the main event of M-1 Challenge 45 against Estonian Denis Smoldarev and lost via submission (keylock).

On September 20, 2015, Delija faced Marcin Tybura at M-1 Challenge 61 for the M-1 Global Heavyweight Championship and lost after he suffered a horrible open fracture of his tibia. Delija had two surgeries on his leg and after the second surgery, he got infected by hospital bacteria.

=== RIZIN ===
Three years after injury, Delija made his comeback in the sport on May 6, 2018, in Fukoka, Japan at RIZIN 10 against Ricardo Prasel and won by unanimous decision.

=== KSW ===
On November 9, 2019, Delija made his debut for Konfrontacji Sztuk Walki, in which he TKOed Englishman – Oli Thompson in the second round.

=== Ultimate Fighting Championship (UFC) (2020) ===
Delija was scheduled to make his UFC debut at UFC Fight Night: Ortega vs. Korean Zombie on October 17, 2020, in Abu Dhabi against Ciryl Gane. The bout was cancelled due to Delijas' active contract with Professional Fighters League.

=== Professional Fighters League (PFL) ===
On February 9, 2021, it was announced that Delija would be part of the PFL heavyweight roster for 2021 season.

Delija opened the PFL 2021 season on May 6 in New Jersey at PFL 3 against Bruno Cappelozza and lost via TKO in first round.

On June 25, Delija defeated Chandler Cole via TKO in first round at PFL 6 and secured place in the PFL Playoffs.

On August 19, Delija defeated Denis Goltsov via unanimous decision at PFL 8 and advanced to the PFL Playoff finals.

On October 27, Delija faced Bruno Cappelozza in the PFL finals at PFL 10 and lost in five round bout via unanimous decision.

Delijas PFL 2022 season campaign started with a KO victory over Matheus Scheffel on April 28 at PFL 2.

On June 24, Delija defeated Shelton Graves via unanimous decision and secured his place in the 2022 PFL Playoffs.

In the PFL Playoff semi-finals, Delija faced Renan Ferreira at PFL 8 and won by TKO in first round and advanced to the finals.

In the finals, Delija was set to face Scheffel, whom he already defeated in first round of tournament and this time was no different. Delija knocked him out in the first round, becoming the PFL 2022 Heavyweight champion and earning the 1 million dollar prize in the process.

Delija faced Maurice Greene on June 16, 2023, at PFL 5. He won the bout via unanimous decision.

Delija faced Valentin Moldavsky at PFL 1 on April 4, 2024. He lost the bout by technical knockout in the first round.

Delija was scheduled to face Vadim Nemkov on January 25, 2025, at Bellator Champions Series 6 (also marketed as PFL Road to Dubai: Champions Series), but Delija withdrew for unknown reasons and was replaced by Corey Anderson.

=== Fight Nation Championship ===
On March 7, 2025, it was announced that Delija had left PFL and signed with leading Croatian promotion Fight Nation Championship.

In his promotional debut, Delija faced Yorgan de Castro on April 12, 2025, at FNC 22. He won the fight via technical knockout in round one.

=== Ultimate Fighting Championship ===
On June 20, 2025, it was announced that Delija had signed a contract to compete in the Ultimate Fighting Championship (UFC).

Delija made his UFC debut against Marcin Tybura in a rematch on September 6, 2025, at UFC Fight Night 258. He won the fight by knockout in the first round. This fight earned him his first Performance of the Night award.

Delija faced Waldo Cortes-Acosta on November 1, 2025, at UFC Fight Night 263. In the first round, the fight was briefly halted due to an eye poke, initially resulting in a mistaken technical knockout win for Delija. After video review, the bout resumed, and Delija lost shortly after by knockout.

Delija was scheduled to face Serghei Spivac on February 1, 2026, at UFC 325. However, the bout was moved to February 21, 2026, at UFC Fight Night 267 for unknown reasons. Delija lost the fight by unanimous decision.

Delija was scheduled to face Johnny Walker at UFC Fight Night 283. However, Delija had to withdraw due to injury.

== Championships and accomplishments ==
=== Mixed martial arts ===
- Professional Fighters League
  - 2022 PFL Heavyweight Championship
  - 2021 PFL Heavyweight Championship Runner-up
- Ultimate Fighting Championship
  - Performance of the Night (One time) vs. Marcin Tybura

== Mixed martial arts record ==
Professional record breakdown
34 matches	26 wins	8 losses
By knockout	13	4
By submission	6	2
By decision	7	2

Res.	Record	Opponent	Method	Event	Date	Round	Time	Location	Notes
Loss	26–8	Serghei Spivac	Decision (unanimous)	UFC Fight Night: Strickland vs. Hernandez	February 21, 2026	3	5:00	Houston, Texas, United States	
Loss	26–7	Waldo Cortes-Acosta	KO (punches)	UFC Fight Night: Garcia vs. Onama	November 1, 2025	1	3:59	Las Vegas, Nevada, United States	
Win	26–6	Marcin Tybura	KO (punches)	UFC Fight Night: Imavov vs. Borralho	September 6, 2025	1	2:03	Paris, France	Performance of the Night.
Win	25–6	Yorgan De Castro	TKO (punches)	Fight Nation Championship 22	April 12, 2025	1	0:41	Ljubljana, Slovenia	
Loss	24–6	Valentin Moldavsky	TKO (knees and punches)	PFL 1 (2024)	April 4, 2024	1	2:17	San Antonio, Texas, United States	
Win	24–5	Maurice Greene	Decision (unanimous)	PFL 5 (2023)	June 16, 2023	3	5:00	Atlanta, Georgia, United States	
Win	23–5	Matheus Scheffel	TKO (punches)	PFL 10 (2022)	November 25, 2022	1	2:50	New York City, New York, United States	Won the 2022 PFL Heavyweight Tournament.
Win	22–5	Renan Ferreira	TKO (punches)	PFL 8 (2022)	August 13, 2022	1	4:31	Cardiff, Wales	2022 PFL Heavyweight Tournament Semifinal.
Win	21–5	Shelton Graves	Decision (unanimous)	PFL 5 (2022)	June 24, 2022	3	5:00	Atlanta, Georgia, United States	Graves was deducted one point in round 2 due to a headbutt.
Win	20–5	Matheus Scheffel	TKO (punches)	PFL 2 (2022)	April 28, 2022	2	0:59	Arlington, Texas, United States	
Loss	19–5	Bruno Cappelozza	Decision (unanimous)	PFL 10 (2021)	October 27, 2021	5	5:00	Hollywood, Florida, United States	2021 PFL Heavyweight Tournament Final.
Win	19–4	Denis Goltsov	Decision (unanimous)	PFL 8 (2021)	August 19, 2021	3	5:00	Hollywood, Florida, United States	2021 PFL Heavyweight Tournament Semifinal.
Win	18–4	Chandler Cole	TKO (punches)	PFL 6 (2021)	June 25, 2021	1	4:39	Atlantic City, New Jersey, United States	
Loss	17–4	Bruno Cappelozza	KO (punches)	PFL 3 (2021)	May 6, 2021	1	0:46	Atlantic City, New Jersey, United States	
Win	17–3	Oli Thompson	TKO (punches)	KSW 51	November 9, 2019	2	1:58	Zagreb, Croatia	
Win	16–3	Carl Seumanutafa	Decision (unanimous)	PFL 3 (2019)	June 6, 2019	3	5:00	Uniondale, New York, United States	
Win	15–3	Ricardo Prasel	Decision (unanimous)	Rizin 10	May 6, 2018	3	5:00	Fukuoka, Japan	
Loss	14–3	Marcin Tybura	TKO (leg injury)	M-1 Challenge 61	September 20, 2015	1	2:21	Nazran, Russia	For the M-1 Global Heavyweight Championship.
Win	14–2	Tibor Soos	TKO (punches)	Obracun Ringu 13	May 30, 2015	1	1:30	Split, Croatia	
Win	13–2	Konstantin Gluhov	Decision (unanimous)	M-1 Challenge 56	April 10, 2015	3	5:00	Nazran, Russia	
Win	12–2	Archontis Taxiarchis	Submission (north-south choke)	Final Fight Championship: Futures 3	September 27, 2014	1	2:59	Zagreb, Croatia	
Win	11–2	Valentijn Overeem	TKO (punches)	Noc Gladiatora 9	July 3, 2014	1	1:24	Dubrovnik, Croatia	
Win	10–2	Ruben Wolf	Submission (guillotine choke)	Final Fight Championship: Futures 2	May 3, 2014	2	1:28	Opatija, Croatia	
Loss	9–2	Denis Smoldarev	Submission (keylock)	M-1 Challenge 45	February 28, 2014	2	2:27	Saint Petersburg, Russia	
Win	9–1	Sergey Sokha	Submission (rear-naked choke)	Noc Gladiatora 8	December 21, 2013	1	1:23	Dubrovnik, Croatia	
Loss	8–1	Dion Staring	Submission (kimura)	Final Fight Championship 8	October 25, 2013	2	2:42	Zagreb, Croatia	
Win	8–0	Gzim Selmani	TKO (punches)	Final Fight Championship 5	May 24, 2013	1	3:09	Osijek, Croatia	
Win	7–0	Michail Laprakis	Submission (rear-naked choke)	Final Fight Championship 3	April 19, 2013	1	1:27	Split, Croatia	
Win	6–0	Ricco Rodriguez	Decision (unanimous)	House of Gladiators 1	December 21, 2012	3	5:00	Dubrovnik, Croatia	
Win	5–0	Kristof Nataška	Submission (rear-naked choke)	Fight for Victory 1	August 3, 2012	2	1:09	Bibinje, Croatia	
Win	4–0	Zeli Zalani	Submission (rear-naked choke)	Opatija Fight Night 4	February 24, 2012	1	N/A	Opatija, Croatia	
Win	3–0	Dražen Forgač	KO (punches)	Noc Gladiatora 6	December 16, 2011	1	1:02	Dubrovnik, Croatia	
Win	2–0	Erni Strmonja	TKO (corner stoppage)	Noc Gladijatora 3	April 23, 2011	1	0:38	Novi Travnik, Bosnia and Herzegovina	
Win	1–0	Saša Lazić	TKO (submission to punches)	Herus Fight 1	January 22, 2011	1	1:24	Split, Croatia	Heavyweight debut.
