= PFL 3 (2021) =

Professional Fighters League mixed martial arts event in 2021

- The poster for PFL 3
- Promotion: Professional Fighters League
- Date: May 6, 2021
- Venue: Ocean Casino Resort
- City: Atlantic City, New Jersey, United States
- Estimated viewers: 324,000

Event chronology
PFL 2	PFL 3	PFL 4

The PFL 3 mixed martial arts event for the 2021 season of the Professional Fighters League was held on May 6, 2021. This was the third regular season event of the tournament and included fights in the Heavyweight and women's Lightweight divisions. After the previous two events aired on ESPN2, this was the first event airing on ESPN.

== Background ==
The event was headlined by a heavyweight bout, contested by the former UFC Heavyweight champion Fabrício Werdum and Renan Ferreira.

In the co-main event, the 2019 PFL Lightweight champion Kayla Harrison fought Mariana Morais.

In the second heavyweight fight of the main card, the 2019 PFL Heavyweight champion Ali Isaev was scheduled to face promotional newcomer Hatef Moeil. However, during the week of the event, it was announced that the bout was pulled for unknown reasons and would be rescheduled for June.

Justin Willis and Denis Goltsov were expected to face each other at this event. However, Willis was pulled from the bout after the weigh-ins due to being not medically cleared and replaced by Muhammed DeReese.

== Results ==
Main Card (ESPN)
Weight class				Method	Round	Time	Notes
Heavyweight	Renan Ferreira	vs.	Fabrício Werdum	No Contest (overturned)	1	2:32	(Note: Originally an TKO (punches) win for Ferreira; later ruled a no contest after it was determined Ferreira tapped out to a triangle choke applied by Werdum. Under PFL rules, both competitors are credited with a draw for points purposes.)
Women's Lightweight	Kayla Harrison	def.	Mariana Morais	TKO (punches)	1	1:23
Heavyweight	Brandon Sayles	def.	Mohammed Usman	Technical Submission (rear-naked choke)	2	3:42
Women's Lightweight	Larissa Pacheco	def.	Julija Pajić	TKO (punches)	1	0:51
Preliminary card (ESPN/ESPN+)
Heavyweight	Bruno Cappelozza	def.	Ante Delija	KO (punches)	1	0:46
Women's Lightweight	Kaitlin Young	def.	Cindy Dandois	Decision (unanimous) (30-27, 30-27, 30-27)	3	5:00
Women's Lightweight	Genah Fabian	def.	Laura Sanchez	Decision (unanimous) (30-27, 30-27, 30-27)	3	5:00
Heavyweight	Denis Goltsov	def.	Muhammed DeReese	TKO (punches)	1	4:21
Preliminary card (ESPN+)
Women's Lightweight	Taylor Guardado	def.	Olena Kolesnyk	Decision (unanimous) (29-27, 30-26, 30-26)	3	5:00
Welterweight	Magomed Umalatov	def.	Kyron Bowen	TKO (punch)	2	0:07

== Aftermath ==
On May 10, the New Jersey State Athletic Control Board announced that Renan Ferreira's TKO win against Fabrício Werdum was overturned to a No contest after they found that referee Keith Peterson missed a pair of taps by Ferreira that were caught on camera as Werdum applied a choke right before he lost by TKO. Due to this decision, both Werdum and Ferreria received one point in the standings.

== Standings After Event ==
The PFL points system is based on results of the match. The winner of a fight receives 3 points. If the fight ends in a draw, no contest, or no decision, both fighters will receive 1 point. The bonus for winning a fight in the first, second, or third round is 3 points, 2 points, and 1 point respectively. The bonus for winning in the third round requires a fight be stopped before 4:59 of the third round. No bonus point will be awarded if a fighter wins via decision. For example, if a fighter wins a fight in the first round, then the fighter will receive 6 total points. A decision win will result in three total points. If a fighter misses weight, the opponent (should they comply with weight limits) will receive 3 points due to a walkover victory, regardless of winning or losing the bout, with the fighter who missed weight being deducted 1 standings point; if the non-offending fighter subsequently wins with a stoppage, all bonus points will be awarded. A fighter who was unable to compete for any reason, will receive a 1-point penalty (-1 point in the standings). The fighters who made weight will not receive a walkover, but will earn points and contracted purse amounts based on their performance in the altered matchup.

=== Heavyweight ===
Fighter	Wins	Draws	Losses	1st	2nd	3rd	Total Points (Note: The four fighters with most points advance to the playoffs)
Bruno Cappelozza	1	0	0	1	0	0	6
Denis Goltsov	1	0	0	1	0	0	6
Brandon Sayles	1	0	0	0	1	0	5
Fabricio Werdum	0	1	0	0	0	0	1
Renan Ferreira	0	1	0	0	0	0	1
Ante Delija	0	0	1	0	0	0	0
Muhammed DeReese	0	0	1	0	0	0	0
Mohammed Usman	0	0	1	0	0	0	0
Ali Isaev	0	0	0	0	0	0	-1
Hatef Moeil	0	0	0	0	0	0	-1

=== Women's Lightweight ===
Fighter	Wins	Draws	Losses	1st	2nd	3rd	Total Points (Note: The four fighters with most points advance to the playoffs)
Kayla Harrison	1	0	0	1	0	0	6
Larissa Pacheco	1	0	0	1	0	0	6
Genah Fabian	1	0	0	0	0	0	3
Kaitlin Young	1	0	0	0	0	0	3
Taylor Guardado	1	0	0	0	0	0	3
Cindy Dandois	0	0	1	0	0	0	0
Mariana Morais	0	0	1	0	0	0	0
Olena Kolesnyk	0	0	1	0	0	0	0
Julija Pajić	0	0	1	0	0	0	0
Laura Sanchez	0	0	1	0	0	0	0

== See also ==
- List of PFL events
- List of current PFL fighters
