= Justin Willis =

American mixed martial arts fighter (born 1987)

- Born: Justin Willis; July 19, 1987 (age 39); East Palo Alto, California, United States
- Other names: Big Pretty
- Height: 6 ft 1 in (1.85 m)
- Weight: 265 lb (120 kg; 18.9 st)
- Division: Heavyweight
- Reach: 79 in (201 cm)
- Stance: Southpaw
- Fighting out of: San Jose, California, United States
- Team: American Kickboxing Academy
- Years active: 2012–present

Mixed martial arts record
- Total: 10
- Wins: 8
- By knockout: 4
- By decision: 4
- Losses: 2
- By knockout: 1
- By decision: 1

Other information
- Mixed martial arts record from Sherdog

Justin Willis (born July 19, 1987) is an American professional mixed martial artist competing in the Heavyweight division. A professional competitor since 2012, he has formerly competed for the World Series of Fighting and the Ultimate Fighting Championship.

== Background ==
Born and raised in California, Willis played football through high school and the collegiate level as a lineman at San Jose State University, graduating with a degree in sociology. At the collegiate level, Willis was All-Conference.

== Mixed martial arts career ==
=== Early career ===
Willis made his amateur debut in 2009, a second-round loss, before competing again as an amateur bout on the Strikeforce: Diaz vs. Noons 2 against Steve Dickey. Willis won via unanimous decision . After going professional in 2012, he amassed a record of 4–1 before being signed by the UFC.

=== Ultimate Fighting Championship ===
Willis made his promotional debut on July 16, 2017, against James Mulheron at UFC Fight Night: Nelson vs. Ponzinibbio. He won via unanimous decision.

He then faced Allen Crowder at UFC 218 on December 2, 2017 and won via knockout in the first round.

He faced Chase Sherman on April 21, 2018, at UFC Fight Night 128 and won by unanimous decision.

He faced Mark Hunt on December 2, 2018, at UFC Fight Night 142 and won by unanimous decision.

Willis faced Curtis Blaydes on March 23, 2019, at UFC Fight Night 148. Blaydes continually took Willis down and controlled him and also scored a knockdown in the second round. Willis lost the fight via unanimous decision. Willis spent a good amount of the pre-fight press time taunting Blaydes, who responded in kind in his post-fight interview, referring to Willis as "Big Titty".

On May 24, 2019, it was reported that Willis was released from the UFC.

=== Professional Fighters League ===
On February 11, 2020, news surfaced that Willis had signed with the PFL and was expected to compete in the PFL 2021 heavyweight season.

Willis was expected to make his debut against Denis Goltsov at PFL 3 on May 6, 2021, but was removed from the fight prior to weigh-ins.

== Mixed martial arts record ==
Professional record breakdown
10 matches	8 wins	2 losses
By knockout	4	1
By decision	4	1

Res.	Record	Opponent	Method	Event	Date	Round	Time	Location	Notes
Loss	8–2	Curtis Blaydes	Decision (unanimous)	UFC Fight Night: Thompson vs. Pettis	March 23, 2019	3	5:00	Nashville, Tennessee, United States	
Win	8–1	Mark Hunt	Decision (unanimous)	UFC Fight Night: dos Santos vs. Tuivasa	December 2, 2018	3	5:00	Adelaide, Australia	
Win	7–1	Chase Sherman	Decision (unanimous)	UFC Fight Night: Barboza vs. Lee	April 21, 2018	3	5:00	Atlantic City, New Jersey, United States	
Win	6–1	Allen Crowder	KO (punch)	UFC 218	December 2, 2017	1	2:33	Detroit, Michigan, United States	
Win	5–1	James Mulheron	Decision (unanimous)	UFC Fight Night: Nelson vs. Ponzinibbio	July 16, 2017	3	5:00	Glasgow, Scotland	
Win	4–1	Julian Coutinho	TKO (punches)	WSOF 31	June 17, 2016	2	0:30	Mashantucket, Connecticut, United States	
Win	3–1	Rizvan Kuniev	Decision (unanimous)	Inoki Genome Fight 4	August 29, 2015	2	5:00	Tokyo, Japan	Openweight bout.
Win	2–1	Yusuke Kawaguchi	TKO (punches)	Inoki Bom-Ba-Ye 2014	December 31, 2014	1	0:43	Tokyo, Japan	Openweight bout.
Win	1–1	James Kirby	TKO (punches)	Global Knockout: The Return	June 14, 2014	1	N/A	Jackson, California, United States	
Loss	0–1	Henry Solis	TKO (elbows)	ROF 43: Bad Blood	June 2, 2012	2	4:32	Broomfield, Colorado, United States	

== See also ==
- List of male mixed martial artists
