= UFC Fight Night: Moicano vs. The Korean Zombie =

UFC mixed martial arts event in 2019

- The poster for UFC Fight Night: Moicano vs. The Korean Zombie
- Promotion: Ultimate Fighting Championship
- Date: June 22, 2019
- Venue: Bon Secours Wellness Arena
- City: Greenville, South Carolina
- Attendance: 7,682
- Total gate: $567,930.80

Event chronology
UFC 238: Cejudo vs. Moraes	UFC Fight Night: Moicano vs. The Korean Zombie	UFC on ESPN: Ngannou vs. dos Santos

UFC Fight Night: Moicano vs. The Korean Zombie (also known as UFC Fight Night 154 or UFC on ESPN+ 12) was a mixed martial arts event produced by the Ultimate Fighting Championship held on June 22, 2019, at Bon Secours Wellness Arena in Greenville, South Carolina.

== Background ==
The event marked the promotion's first visit to South Carolina.

A featherweight bout between Renato Moicano and former UFC Featherweight Championship challenger Chan Sung Jung served as the event headliner.

A middleweight bout between Markus Perez and Deron Winn was scheduled for the event. However, on May 9, it was reported that Perez had pulled out of the fight due to injury and was replaced by promotional newcomer Bruno Silva. On June 16, it was reported that Silva was forced out of the bout due to a potential anti-doping violation by USADA and was replaced by returning veteran Eric Spicely.

A bantamweight bout between Cody Stamann and Rob Font was scheduled to take place at the event. However, Stamann pulled out due to an injury and was replaced by John Lineker. The pairing met previously at UFC 198 in May 2016, with Lineker winning the fight via unanimous decision. In turn, Lineker pulled out due to a cut over his eyebrow on weigh in day. As a result, Font did not compete at the event and will be rescheduled for a future event.

== Results ==
Main Card (ESPN+)
Weight class				Method	Round	Time	Notes
Featherweight	Chan Sung Jung	def.	Renato Moicano	TKO (punches)	1	0:58
Welterweight	Randy Brown	def.	Bryan Barberena	TKO (punches)	3	2:54
Bantamweight	Andre Ewell	def.	Anderson dos Santos	Decision (unanimous) (29–28, 29–28, 29–27)	3	5:00
Women's Flyweight	Andrea Lee	def.	Montana De La Rosa	Decision (unanimous) (30–27, 30–27, 29–28)	3	5:00
Middleweight	Kevin Holland	def.	Alessio Di Chirico	Decision (unanimous) (29–28, 29–28, 29–28)	3	5:00
Preliminary Card (ESPN)
Featherweight	Dan Ige	def.	Kevin Aguilar	Decision (unanimous) (29–28, 29–28, 29–27)	3	5:00
Women's Strawweight	Ashley Yoder	def.	Syuri Kondo	Decision (unanimous) (30–26, 30–25, 30–24)	3	5:00
Lightweight	Luis Peña	def.	Matt Wiman	TKO (punches)	3	1:14
Heavyweight	Jairzinho Rozenstruik	def.	Allen Crowder	KO (punches)	1	0:09
Women's Flyweight	Molly McCann	def.	Ariane Lipski	Decision (unanimous) (30–27, 30–27, 30–27)	3	5:00
Middleweight	Deron Winn	def.	Eric Spicely	Decision (unanimous) (29–28, 29–28, 29–28)	3	5:00

== Bonus awards ==
The following fighters received $50,000 bonuses.

- Fight of the Night: Deron Winn vs. Eric Spicely
- Performance of the Night: Chan Sung Jung and Jairzinho Rozenstruik

== See also ==
- List of UFC events
- 2019 in UFC
- List of current UFC fighters
