= Allen Crowder =

American mixed martial arts fighter

- Born: November 8, 1989 (age 36); United States
- Other names: Pretty Boy
- Height: 6 ft 3 in (1.91 m)
- Weight: 250 lb (113 kg; 17 st 12 lb)
- Division: Heavyweight
- Reach: 76 in (193 cm)
- Fighting out of: Mebane, North Carolina
- Team: Team Rubao Carioca BJJ
- Years active: 2014–2019

Mixed martial arts record
- Total: 15
- Wins: 10
- By knockout: 5
- By submission: 3
- By decision: 1
- By disqualification: 1
- Losses: 4
- By knockout: 4
- No contests: 1

Other information
- Mixed martial arts record from Sherdog

Allen Crowder (born November 8, 1989) is a retired American mixed martial artist who competed in the heavyweight division of the Ultimate Fighting Championship (UFC).

== Background ==
Allen Crowder's nickname "Pretty Boy" comes from his amateur career. Prior to his second amateur fight, his opponent told him he was "too pretty to fight". Crowder knocked him out in the first round.

== Mixed martial arts career ==
=== Early career ===
Allen Crowder had an early career record of 8 wins, 2 losses and 1 no contest. He was invited to participate in Dana White's Contender Series 8 of Dana White's Contender Series. Crowder faced Don'Tale Mayes, winning by technical knockout in the third round. He was offered a contract to fight in the UFC after the fight.

=== Ultimate Fighting Championship ===
Crowder made his UFC debut on December 2, 2017 at UFC 218 against Justin Willis. He lost the fight by KO in the first round.

Crowder faced former NFL player Greg Hardy next at UFC Fight Night 143 and won the fight by way of disqualification after Hardy landed an illegal knee strike in the second round.

At UFC Fight Night 154, Crowder fought Jairzinho Rozenstruik and lost the fight in 9 seconds by way of knockout. At the time, this was the second fastest knockout in the UFC heavyweight division.

In November 2019, he announced his retirement from MMA, citing memory issues from sustaining concussions in his last three fights.

== Mixed martial arts record ==
Professional record breakdown
15 matches	10 wins	4 losses
By knockout	5	4
By submission	3	0
By decision	1	0
By disqualification	1	0
No contests	1	

Res.	Record	Opponent	Method	Event	Date	Round	Time	Location	Notes
Loss	10–4 (1)	Jairzinho Rozenstruik	KO (punches)	UFC Fight Night: Moicano vs. The Korean Zombie	June 22, 2019	1	0:09	Greenville, South Carolina, United States	
Win	10–3 (1)	Greg Hardy	DQ (illegal knee)	UFC Fight Night: Cejudo vs. Dillashaw	January 19, 2019	2	2:28	Brooklyn, New York, United States	
Loss	9–3 (1)	Justin Willis	KO (punches)	UFC 218	December 2, 2017	1	2:33	Detroit, Michigan, United States	
Win	9–2 (1)	Don'Tale Mayes	TKO (punches and elbows)	Dana White's Contender Series 8	August 29, 2017	3	4:12	Las Vegas, Nevada, United States	
Win	8–2 (1)	Robert Neal	TKO (punches)	Bellator Monster Energy Fight Series: Charlotte	May 20, 2017	1	2:24	Charlotte, North Carolina, United States	
Win	7–2 (1)	Chase Gamble	TKO (slam)	NLFC - Next Level Fight Club 6	January 28, 2017	1	4:43	Raleigh, North Carolina, United States	
Win	6–2 (1)	Keith Bell	TKO (punches)	NLFC - Next Level Fight Club 5	May 21, 2016	1	0:16	Raleigh, North Carolina, United States	
NC	5–2 (1)	Lorenzo Hood	NC (accidental eye poke)	NLFC - Next Level Fight Club 4	February 27, 2016	1	2:13	Raleigh, North Carolina, United States	
Loss	5–2	Ryan Pokryfky	TKO (punches)	Camp Lejeune - For The Leathernecks 4	September 2, 2015	3	3:42	Jacksonville, North Carolina, United States	
Loss	5–1	Curtis Blaydes	TKO (punches)	RDMMA - Battle in the South 10	April 10, 2015	2	N/A	Wilmington, North Carolina, United States	
Win	5–0	William Baptiste	TKO (cut)	NLFC - Next Level Fight Club 1	February 28, 2015	1	5:00	Greenville, North Carolina, United States	
Win	4–0	Tomar Washington	Submission (rear-naked choke)	Warfare 13 - Dawn of the Strikers	November 22, 2014	2	2:30	North Myrtle Beach, South Carolina, United States	
Win	3–0	Arnold Adams	Decision (unanimous)	RDMMA - Battle In The South 9	August 2, 2014	3	4:00	Wilmington, North Carolina, United States	
Win	2–0	Arnold Adams	Submission (choke)	RDMMA - Battle In The South 8	March 22, 2014	2	0:31	Wilmington, North Carolina, United States	
Win	1–0	Gil Isabel	Submission (guillotine choke)	ROC 47 - Ring of Combat 47	January 24, 2014	2	0:15	Atlantic City, New Jersey, United States	
