= Jairzinho Rozenstruik =

Surinamese mixed martial artist (born 1988)

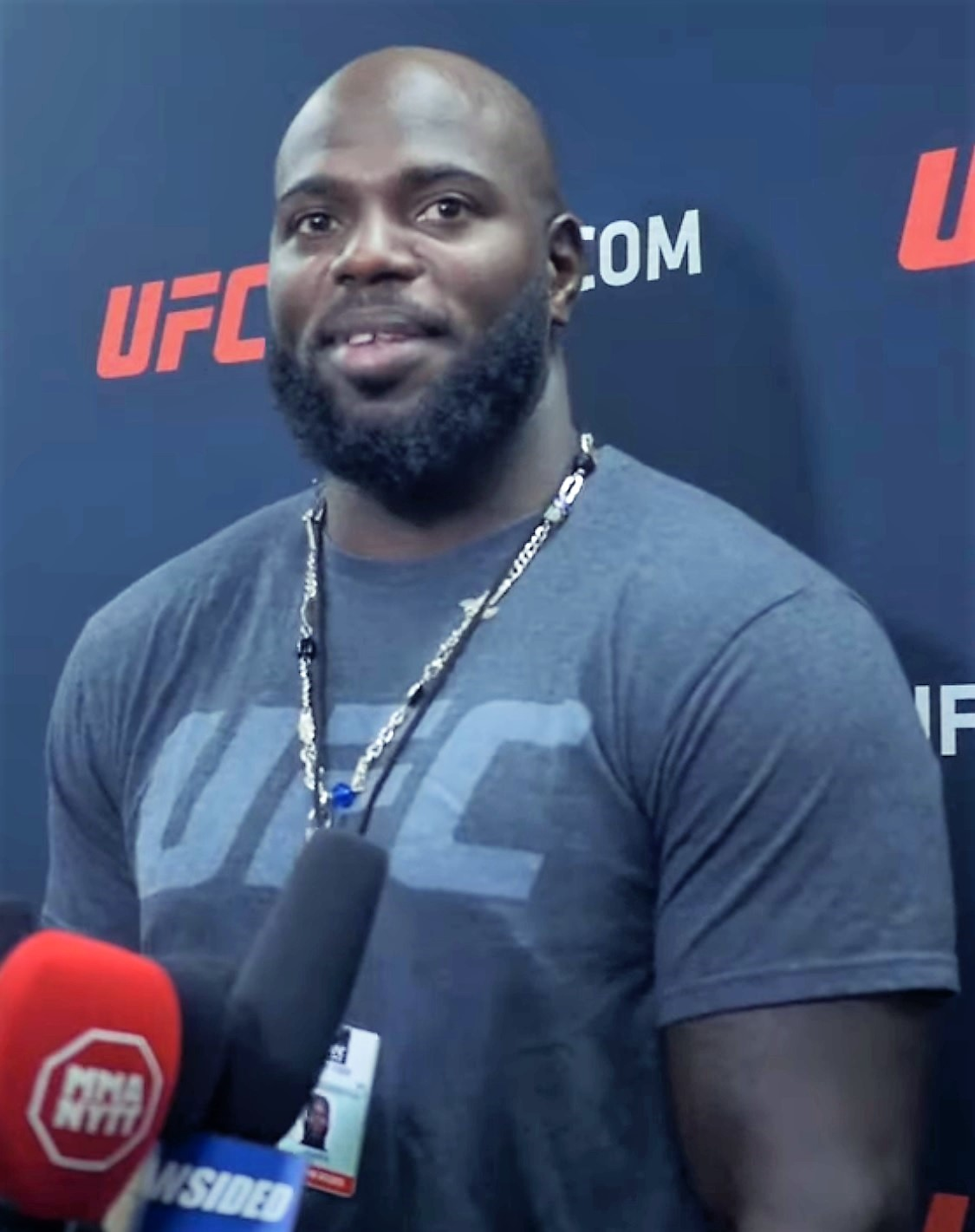
- Rozenstruik at UFC 244 in 2019
- Born: Jairzinho R. Rozenstruik; 17 March 1988 (age 38); Paramaribo, Suriname
- Nickname: Bigi Boy
- Height: 6 ft 2 in (188 cm)
- Weight: 252 lb (114 kg; 18 st 0 lb)
- Division: Heavyweight
- Reach: 78 in (198 cm)
- Style: Kickboxing
- Fighting out of: Paramaribo, Suriname
- Team: Team Bigi Boy; American Top Team
- Years active: 2009–2017 (Kickboxing); 2012–present (MMA)

Kickboxing record
- Total: 85
- Wins: 76
- By knockout: 64
- Losses: 8
- By knockout: 2
- Draws: 1

Mixed martial arts record
- Total: 21
- Wins: 15
- By knockout: 13
- By decision: 2
- Losses: 6
- By knockout: 2
- By submission: 1
- By decision: 3

Other information
- Mixed martial arts record from Sherdog

Jairzinho R. Rozenstruik (born 17 March 1988) is a Surinamese professional mixed martial artist and former kickboxer. He is the current Dirty Boxing Heavyweight Champion. He formerly competed in the Heavyweight division of the Ultimate Fighting Championship (UFC). Rozenstruik currently holds the record for second fastest knockout in the heavyweight division against Allen Crowder at UFC Fight Night 154. In kickboxing, he is a former WLF Super Heavyweight Tournament Champion and a Superkombat World Grand Prix I 2013 Runner-Up.

== Background ==
Rozenstruik was born and raised in Paramaribo. His parents were football fans and named him after the Brazilian star Jairzinho. Rozenstruik played football and basketball before starting to train kickboxing at the age of seventeen in a local gym. After he competed in kickboxing, he transitioned to mixed martial arts in 2012.

== Martial arts career ==
=== Kickboxing ===
At the age of seventeen, Rozenstruik started training in a gym called Rens Project. There he started to take kickboxing lessons and soon he was discovered by Michael Babb, a coach from the Vos Gym in Amsterdam, Netherlands. Trained by Babb, he came out for the House of Legends under the supervision of Ivan Hippolyte.

Rozenstruik started his combat sports career in kickboxing. He won a total of 76 matches with 64 of them by knockout out of 85 he competed in.

=== Mixed martial arts career ===
==== Early career ====
In May 2012, Rozenstruik won his debut MMA fight against Evgeny Boldyrev at DRAKA MMA: Governor's Cup 7 in Vladivostok, Russia.

In April 2017, after five years of focusing on his kickboxing career, Rozenstruik won an MMA match versus Engelbert Berbin during a regional promotion in Aruba.

In April 2018, Rozenstruik signed a multi-fight contract with the Rizin Fighting Federation.

In May 2018, Rozenstruik won his promotional debut versus Andrey Kovalev at Rizin FF – Rizin 10 by split decision.

==== Ultimate Fighting Championship ====
Rozenstruik made his UFC debut on 2 February 2019, against Júnior Albini, replacing injured Dmitry Sosnovskiy, at UFC Fight Night: Assunção vs. Moraes 2. He won the fight via TKO in the second round.

Rozenstruik faced Allen Crowder on 22 June 2019, at UFC Fight Night: Moicano vs. The Korean Zombie. He won the fight via knockout in round one. This fight earned him the Performance of the Night award.

Rozenstruik faced Andrei Arlovski on 2 November 2019, at UFC 244. He won the fight via knockout in round one.

Rozenstruik faced Alistair Overeem, replacing Walt Harris due to the ongoing search for his missing step-daughter, on 7 December 2019, at UFC on ESPN 7. He won the fight via knockout in round five.

Rozenstruik was scheduled to face Francis Ngannou on 28 March 2020, at UFC on ESPN: Ngannou vs. Rozenstruik. However, due to the COVID-19 pandemic, it was announced the event has been postponed. The pair were rescheduled to meet on 18 April 2020, at UFC 249. However, on 9 April Dana White, the president of UFC announced that the event was once again postponed and the bout eventually took place on 9 May 2020. Rozenstruik lost the fight via knockout just 20 seconds into the first round.

Rozenstruik faced Junior dos Santos on 15 August 2020, at UFC 252. He won the fight via technical knockout in the second round.

Rozenstruik faced Ciryl Gane on 27 February 2021, at UFC Fight Night: Rozenstruik vs. Gane. He lost the fight via unanimous decision.

Rozenstruik faced Augusto Sakai on 5 June 2021, at UFC Fight Night: Rozenstruik vs. Sakai. He won the fight via knockout in the closing seconds of the first round. This win earned him the Performance of the Night award.

Rozenstruik faced Curtis Blaydes on 25 September 2021, at UFC 266. He lost the fight via unanimous decision.

Rozenstruik was scheduled to face Marcin Tybura on 26 February 2022, at UFC Fight Night 202. However, in mid January it was announced the bout was moved to UFC 273 on 9 April 2022. However, the bout was pulled from the card after Tybura withdrew due to an undisclosed illness.

Rozenstruik faced Alexander Volkov on 4 June 2022, at UFC Fight Night 207. He lost the fight via technical knockout in round one.

Rozenstruik was scheduled to face Chris Daukaus on 1 October 2022, at UFC Fight Night 211. However, for unknown reasons, the bout was moved to UFC 282 on 10 December 2022. Rozenstruik won the fight via technical knockout just twenty three seconds into the first round. This win earned him the Performance of the Night award.

Rozenstruik faced Jailton Almeida on 13 May 2023, at UFC on ABC 4. He lost the bout via rear naked choke in first round.

Rozenstruik faced Shamil Gaziev on 2 March 2024, at UFC Fight Night 238. Rozenstruik landed many jabs throughout the fight and won the fight by technical knockout at the end of the fourth round as Gaziev was unable to see.

Rozenstruik faced Tai Tuivasa on 18 August 2024 at UFC 305. He won the fight by a split decision. Judge Howie Booth, who scored the fight 30-27 for Tuivasa, was relieved of his duties midway through the event, and received widespread criticism from numerous pundits, fighters, and fans for his scorecard. 15 out of 15 media outlets scored the bout 30-27 for Rozenstruik.

Rozenstruik faced former UFC Interim Heavyweight Championship challenger Sergei Pavlovich on 1 February 2025 at UFC Fight Night 250. He lost the fight by unanimous decision.

On 3 February 2025, following his loss to Pavlovich, Rozenstruik was released by the UFC.

=== Dirty Boxing ===
On 14 June 2025, Rozenstriuk made his debut with Mike Perry's "Dirty Boxing" promotion at "DBX 2" against Victor Cardoso, winning by technical knockout in the second round.

Rozenstruik was booked for the very first Dirty Boxing Championship fight, being matched against Rob "The Wolf" Perez at DBX 3 on 29 August 2025. Perez was forced to withdraw from the title fight due to injury, and was replaced by Rakim Cleveland. Rozenstruik won the Dirty Boxing World Heavyweight Championship via KO in the first round, dropping Cleveland with an overhand left, and following up with a single ground strike before the fight was stopped.

== Championships and accomplishments ==
=== Mixed martial arts ===
- Ultimate Fighting Championship
  - Performance of the Night (Three times) vs. Allen Crowder, Augusto Sakai and Chris Daukaus
  - Latest finish in UFC Heavyweight division history (4:56) vs Alistair Overeem
  - Second fastest finish in UFC Heavyweight division history (0:09) vs Allen Crowder
    - Third fastest finish in UFC history (0:09) vs Allen Crowder
  - Only fighter to have three knockouts of 30 seconds or less in UFC history
  - UFC.com Awards
    - 2019: Newcomer of the Year
- MMA Junkie
  - 2019 Newcomer of the Year
  - 2019 Comeback of the Year vs. Alistair Overeem
- Combat Press
  - 2019 Comeback of the Year vs. Alistair Overeem
- Fight Matrix
  - 2019 Most Improved Fighter of the Year
- Bloody Elbow
  - 2019 Newcomer of the Year

=== Kickboxing ===
- Zweet en Tranen world championship
  - 2018 Zweet en Tranen Heavyweight Champion (SuThaiBo) champion (1 time)
- DangerZone
  - 2017 DangerZone Heavyweight Champion (1 time)
- Wu Lin Feng
  - 2016 WLF Super Heavyweight Tournament Champion (1 time)
- SUPERKOMBAT Fighting Championship
  - 2013 SUPERKOMBAT World Grand Prix I Tournament Runner-up
- SLAMM!!
  - Soema Na Basi Heavyweight Champion (3 times) 2012, 2013 and 2016
- Lifetime Achievement Award
  - "Lifetime Achievement Award" by the Minister of Youth and Sports of Suriname for his national and international performances

=== Dirty Boxing ===
- Dirty Boxing Heavyweight Championship (One time, Current)

== Personal life ==
Rozenstruik has two daughters and a son.

=== Legal issues ===
In August 2014, Rozenstruik was arrested and detained by the Dutch police on suspicion of smuggling drugs along with seven other Surinamese in the Netherlands. The group claimed they were attending a kickboxing event. After 14 days of detention, Rozenstruik was released as the authorities found seven members of the group had swallowed balls of drugs but not Rozenstruik, and he was the only kickboxer in the group.

== Mixed martial arts record ==
Professional record breakdown
21 matches	15 wins	6 losses
By knockout	13	2
By submission	0	1
By decision	2	3

Res.	Record	Opponent	Method	Event	Date	Round	Time	Location	Notes
Loss	15–6	Sergei Pavlovich	Decision (unanimous)	UFC Fight Night: Adesanya vs. Imavov	1 February 2025	3	5:00	Riyadh, Saudi Arabia	
Win	15–5	Tai Tuivasa	Decision (split)	UFC 305	18 August 2024	3	5:00	Perth, Australia	
Win	14–5	Shamil Gaziev	TKO (retirement)	UFC Fight Night: Rozenstruik vs. Gaziev	2 March 2024	4	5:00	Las Vegas, Nevada, United States	
Loss	13–5	Jailton Almeida	Submission (rear-naked choke)	UFC on ABC: Rozenstruik vs. Almeida	13 May 2023	1	3:43	Charlotte, North Carolina, United States	
Win	13–4	Chris Daukaus	KO (punch)	UFC 282	10 December 2022	1	0:23	Las Vegas, Nevada, United States	Performance of the Night.
Loss	12–4	Alexander Volkov	TKO (punches)	UFC Fight Night: Volkov vs. Rozenstruik	4 June 2022	1	2:12	Las Vegas, Nevada, United States	
Loss	12–3	Curtis Blaydes	Decision (unanimous)	UFC 266	25 September 2021	3	5:00	Las Vegas, Nevada, United States	
Win	12–2	Augusto Sakai	TKO (punches)	UFC Fight Night: Rozenstruik vs. Sakai	5 June 2021	1	4:59	Las Vegas, Nevada, United States	Performance of the Night.
Loss	11–2	Ciryl Gane	Decision (unanimous)	UFC Fight Night: Rozenstruik vs. Gane	27 February 2021	5	5:00	Las Vegas, Nevada, United States	
Win	11–1	Junior dos Santos	TKO (punches)	UFC 252	15 August 2020	2	3:47	Las Vegas, Nevada, United States	
Loss	10–1	Francis Ngannou	KO (punches)	UFC 249	9 May 2020	1	0:20	Jacksonville, Florida, United States	
Win	10–0	Alistair Overeem	KO (punch)	UFC on ESPN: Overeem vs. Rozenstruik	7 December 2019	5	4:56	Washington, D.C., United States	
Win	9–0	Andrei Arlovski	KO (punch)	UFC 244	2 November 2019	1	0:29	New York City, New York, United States	
Win	8–0	Allen Crowder	KO (punches)	UFC Fight Night: Moicano vs. The Korean Zombie	22 June 2019	1	0:09	Greenville, South Carolina, United States	Performance of the Night.
Win	7–0	Júnior Albini	TKO (head kick and punches)	UFC Fight Night: Assunção vs. Moraes 2	2 February 2019	2	0:54	Fortaleza, Brazil	
Win	6–0	Robert McCarthy	KO (punches)	Team Yvel: Fearless 3	27 December 2018	1	0:10	Paramaribo, Suriname	Won the Fearless Heavyweight Championship.
Win	5–0	Andrey Kovalev	Decision (split)	Rizin 10	6 May 2018	3	5:00	Fukuoka, Japan	
Win	4–0	Marvin Aboeli	TKO (punches)	Fighting with the Stars: Bloed, Zweet & Tranen 3	22 December 2017	1	N/A	Paramaribo, Suriname	
Win	3–0	Engelbert Berbin	KO (punches)	Aruba International FC 1	28 April 2017	1	N/A	Oranjestad, Aruba	
Win	2–0	Evgeni Boldyrev	KO (punch)	Draka MMA: Governor's Cup 11	24 November 2012	1	2:05	Khabarovsk, Russia	
Win	1–0	Evgeni Boldyrev	KO (punch)	Draka MMA: Governor's Cup 7	26 May 2012	1	2:36	Vladivostok, Russia	Heavyweight debut.

== Kickboxing record (incomplete) ==
Kickboxing record (Incomplete)
76 wins (64 (T)KO's), 8 losses (2 (T)KO's, 6 decisions), 1 draw
Date	Result	Opponent	Event	Location	Method	Round	Time
30 July 2017	Win	Carlos Salazar	Deadly Despair 2	Paramaribo, Suriname	TKO	3	N/A
27 December 2016	Win	Sergio Pique	Bloed, Zweet & Tranen 2	Paramaribo, Suriname	KO	2	N/A
Wins Dangerzone Tournament Heavyweight Championship +95kg.
3 December 2016	Win	Donegi Abena	Wu Lin Feng 2016: WLF x Krush – China vs Japan, Final	Zhengzhou, China	KO	1	N/A
Wins WLF Super Heavyweight Tournament.
3 December 2016	Win	Song Liyuan	Wu Lin Feng 2016: WLF x Krush – China vs Japan, Semi Final	Zhengzhou, China	Decision (unanimous)	3	3:00
29 July 2016	Win	Ricardo Soneca	United Caribbean	Clevia, Suriname	TKO	1	N/A
Wins EEN World Heavyweight Kickboxing Championship.
28 May 2016	Win	Kamran Aminzadeh	God of the Arena 2	Zhengzhou, China	Decision (unanimous)	3	3:00
30 April 2016	Win	Kenneth Bishop	N/A	Paramaribo, Suriname	KO	1	N/A
20 December 2015	Win	Colin George	Bloed, Zweet & Tranen	Paramaribo, Suriname	KO	1	N/A
1 June 2014	Win	Paulo Rogerio Neves Ferreira	The New Generation II – Suriname vs. Brazil	Suriname	TKO	2	N/A
21 December 2013	Win	Mikhail Tyuterev	Cup of Champions 2013	Novosibirsk, Russia	Ext. R. Decision (unanimous)	3	3:00
28 September 2013	Win	Dennis Stolzenbach	Next Generation	Paramaribo, Suriname	Decision (unanimous)	3	3:00
3 August 2013	Win	Rodney Glunder	Beat Down	Paramaribo, Suriname	KO (punches)	3	N/A
18 May 2013	Loss	Benjamin Adegbuyi	SUPERKOMBAT World Grand Prix II 2013	Craiova, Romania	Decision (unanimous)	3	3:00
6 April 2013	Loss	Muamer Tufekčić	SUPERKOMBAT World Grand Prix I 2013, Semi Finals	Oradea, Romania	Decision (majority)	3	3:00
For the SUPERKOMBAT World Grand Prix I 2013 tournament title.
6 April 2013	Win	Nikolaj Falin	SUPERKOMBAT World Grand Prix I 2013, Semi Finals	Oradea, Romania	Decision (majority)	3	3:00
9 March 2013	Win	Oscar Isidoro	Death B4 Defeat	Paramaribo, Suriname	TKO	N/A	N/A
28 December 2012	Win	Marcello Adriaansz	Slamm Soema na Basi III	Paramaribo, Suriname	KO	N/A	N/A
20 October 2012	Win	Dennis Stolzenbach	Emmen Fight Night	Emmen, Netherlands	N/A	N/A	N/A
12 May 2012	Loss	Raul Cătinaș	SUPERKOMBAT World Grand Prix II 2012, Semi Finals	Cluj Napoca, Romania	KO (left punch)	2	N/A
28 December 2011	Win	Jan Siersema	Slamm Soema na Basi II	Paramaribo, Suriname	Decision	N/A	3:00
Wins Soema na Basi Heavyweight Championship.
19 November 2011	Win	Benjamin Adegbuyi	SUPERKOMBAT World Grand Prix 2011 Final, Reserve Fight	Darmstadt, Germany	KO (left hook)	2	1:37
30 October 2011	Loss	Michael Duut	Kickboksgala Kalverdijkje	Leeuwarden, Netherlands	Decision	3	3:00
26 August 2011	Win	Jahya Gulay	SLAMM! Events: Super Suri Thaiboxing Cup	Paramaribo, Suriname	TKO	N/A	N/A
21 May 2011	Loss	Roman Kleibl	SuperKombat World Grand Prix I 2011, Semi Finals	Bucharest, Romania	Decision (unanimous)	3	3:00
15 May 2011	Win	Mitchell de Ligny	Rings Gala	Amstelveen, Netherlands	Decision	3	3:00
March 2011	Loss	Ricardo Soneca	Tatneft World Cup 2011	Kazan, Russia	KO	2	N/A
23 December 2010	Loss	Reamon Welboren	Wij zijn Boos Klaar om te Bosse II	Paramaribo, Suriname	Decision	3	3:00
24 November 2010	Win	Mutlu Karabulut	RINGS gala "Blood, Sweat & Tears"	Netherlands	KO	N/A	N/A
October 2010	Win	Etienne Schop	No Guts No Glory 4	Netherlands	KO	2	N/A
3 October 2010	Win	Utley Meriana	Memento Mori part 1	Rotterdam, Netherlands	TKO	2	N/A
29 August 2010	Win	Erik Rivera	Fighting with the Stars	Paramaribo, Suriname	KO	1	N/A
21 March 2010	Draw	Jahfarr Wilnis	K-1 World MAX 2010 West Europe Tournament	Utrecht, Netherlands	Draw	3	3:00
23 December 2009	Loss	Murat Aygun	N/A	Paramaribo, Suriname	Decision	3	3:00
Legend: Win Loss Draw/No contest Notes

== Dirty Boxing record ==
Professional record breakdown
2 matches	2 wins	0 losses
By knockout	2	0

Res.	Record	Opponent	Method	Event	Date	Round	Time	Location	Notes
Win	2–0	Rakim Cleveland	TKO (punches)	Dirty Boxing Championship 3	August 29, 2025	1	1:54	Miami, Florida, United States	Won the inaugural Dirty Boxing Heavyweight Championship.
Win	1–0	Victor Cardoso	TKO (punches)	Dirty Boxing Championship 2	June 14, 2025	2	2:00	Miami, Florida, United States	Dirty Boxing debut.

== See also ==
- List of male mixed martial artists
