= UFC 218 =

UFC mixed martial arts event in 2017

UFC 218: Holloway vs. Aldo 2
- The poster for UFC 218: Holloway vs. Aldo 2
- Promotion: Ultimate Fighting Championship
- Date: December 2, 2017
- Venue: Little Caesars Arena
- City: Detroit, Michigan
- Attendance: 17,587
- Total gate: $2,000,000
- Buyrate: 230,000

Event chronology
The Ultimate Fighter: A New World Champion Finale	UFC 218: Holloway vs. Aldo 2	UFC Fight Night: Swanson vs. Ortega

UFC 218: Holloway vs. Aldo 2 was a mixed martial arts event produced by the Ultimate Fighting Championship that was held on December 2, 2017, at Little Caesars Arena in Detroit, Michigan.

== Background ==
After previously contesting two events in the Metro Detroit area (and the first since UFC 123 in November 2010), the event was the first for the promotion at the newly built venue.

A UFC Featherweight Championship bout between current champion Max Holloway and former UFC Lightweight Champion Frankie Edgar was expected to serve as the main event. However, on November 11, Edgar was forced to withdraw from the fight citing injury. He was replaced by former WEC Featherweight Champion and former two-time champion José Aldo. Aldo was scheduled to face Ricardo Lamas at UFC on Fox: Lawler vs. dos Anjos in a rematch of his successful title defense at UFC 169 in February, 2014. Holloway and Aldo met previously at UFC 212, with the former defeating the latter to win the championship.

A UFC Heavyweight title eliminator bout between former K-1 Grand Prix champion Alistair Overeem and up and coming contender Francis Ngannou co-headlined the event. The winner would be matched against champion Stipe Miocic for the title. Miocic had previously defeated Overeem by first round knockout at UFC 203 in September 2016.

A flyweight bout between 2008 Olympic gold medalist in freestyle wrestling and former UFC Flyweight Championship challenger Henry Cejudo and Sergio Pettis, initially scheduled for UFC 211 before Cejudo pulled out with a hand injury, was rescheduled for this event. Subsequently, Cejudo's availability for the event was briefly in doubt as he suffered minor burn injuries to his right foot on the evening of October 9 as he was evacuating his hotel as a result of the Tubbs Fire near Santa Rosa, California. The following day, his management team confirmed that the fight with Pettis was still on for the event.

Al Iaquinta was scheduled to face Paul Felder at the event. However, Iaquinta pulled out of the fight on October 31 citing an injury. Felder remained on the card against Charles Oliveira.

== Results ==
Main Card
Weight class				Method	Round	Time	Notes
Featherweight	Max Holloway (c)	def.	José Aldo	TKO (punches)	3	4:51	(Note: For the UFC Featherweight Championship.)
Heavyweight	Francis Ngannou	def.	Alistair Overeem	KO (punch)	1	1:42	(Note: UFC Heavyweight title eliminator.)
Flyweight	Henry Cejudo	def.	Sergio Pettis	Decision (unanimous) (30–27, 30–27, 30–27)	3	5:00
Lightweight	Eddie Alvarez	def.	Justin Gaethje	KO (knee)	3	3:59
Women's Strawweight	Tecia Torres	def.	Michelle Waterson-Gomez	Decision (unanimous) (30–27, 29–28, 29–28)	3	5:00
Preliminary Card (Fox Sports 1)
Lightweight	Paul Felder	def.	Charles Oliveira	TKO (elbows)	2	4:06
Welterweight	Yancy Medeiros	def.	Alex Oliveira	TKO (punches)	3	2:02
Lightweight	David Teymur	def.	Drakkar Klose	Decision (unanimous) (30–27, 30–27, 29–28)	3	5:00
Women's Strawweight	Felice Herrig	def.	Cortney Casey	Decision (split) (29–28, 28–29, 29–28)	3	5:00
Preliminary Card (UFC Fight Pass)
Women's Strawweight	Amanda Cooper	def.	Angela Magaña	TKO (punches)	2	4:34
Welterweight	Abdul Razak Alhassan	def.	Sabah Homasi	TKO (punches)	1	4:21
Light Heavyweight	Dominick Reyes	def.	Jeremy Kimball	Submission (rear-naked choke)	1	3:39
Heavyweight	Justin Willis	def.	Allen Crowder	KO (punch)	1	2:33

== Bonus awards ==
The following fighters were awarded $50,000 bonuses:

- Fight of the Night: Eddie Alvarez vs. Justin Gaethje and Yancy Medeiros vs. Alex Oliveira
- Performance of the Night: None awarded

== See also ==
- List of UFC events
- 2017 in UFC
