= Francis Ngannou =

Cameroonian mixed martial artist and boxer (born 1986)

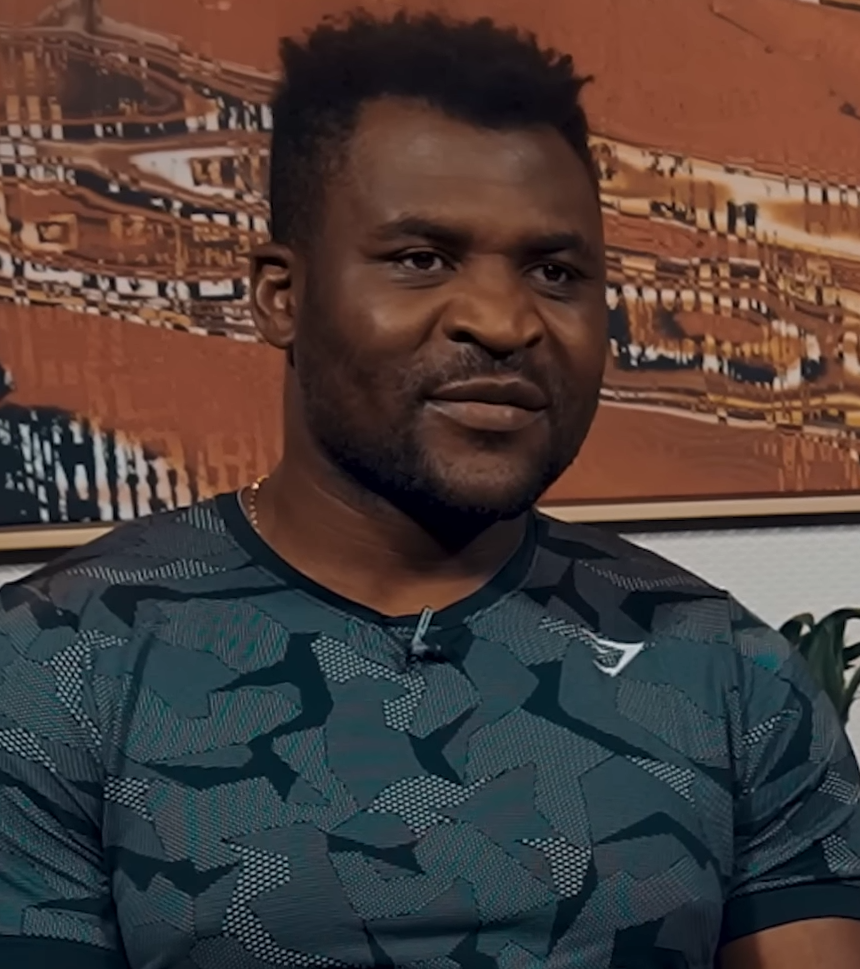
- Ngannou in 2023
- Born: Francis Zavier Ngannou; 5 September 1986 (age 40); Batié, Cameroon
- Nickname: The Predator
- Citizenship: Cameroon; France
- Height: 6 ft 4 in (193 cm)
- Weight: 257 lb (117 kg; 18 st 5 lb)
- Division: Heavyweight
- Reach: 83 in (211 cm)
- Fighting out of: Las Vegas, Nevada, U.S.
- Team: MMA Factory (2013–2018); UFC Performance Institute; Xtreme Couture (2018–present)
- Trainer: Eric Nicksick (Head coach); Dewey Cooper (Striking coach, 2017–present); Fernand Lopez (formerly)
- Years active: 2013–present

Professional boxing record
- Total: 2
- Losses: 2
- By knockout: 1

Kickboxing record
- Total: 1
- Wins: 1

Mixed martial arts record
- Total: 22
- Wins: 19
- By knockout: 14
- By submission: 4
- By decision: 1
- Losses: 3
- By decision: 3

Other information
- Mixed martial arts record from Sherdog

Francis Zavier Ngannou (born 5 September 1986) is a Cameroonian and French professional mixed martial artist and professional boxer who currently competes in the Heavyweight division. He previously competed in the heavyweight division in the Ultimate Fighting Championship (UFC) from 2015 to 2022, where he was the reigning UFC Heavyweight Champion at the time of his departure from the promotion, and in the Professional Fighters League (PFL), where he was the inaugural PFL Super Fights Heavyweight Champion.

Known for his punching power, Ngannou was widely viewed as the most destructive pure puncher in the UFC's heavyweight division; he ended seven of his fourteen UFC fights by knockout before the two-minute mark in the first round. He is considered the lineal heavyweight champion in mixed martial arts.

== Early life and education ==
Ngannou was born and raised in the village of Batié, Cameroon. He lived in poverty and had little formal education growing up. Ngannou's parents divorced when he was six years old, and he was sent to live with his aunt. At 10 years old, Ngannou started working in a sand quarry in Batié because of a lack of funds. As a youngster, he was approached by several gangs in his village to join them. However, Ngannou refused and instead decided to use his father's negative reputation as a street fighter as motivation to do something positive and pursue boxing.

At age 22, Ngannou began training in boxing, despite the initial reluctance of his family. After training for a year, Ngannou stopped training due to an illness. He did various odd jobs to make ends meet, until age 26 when he decided to head to Paris, France, to pursue professional boxing. However upon reaching Europe, he was jailed for two months in Spain for illegally crossing the border. After he reached Paris, he had no money, no friends, and no place to live. After living homeless on the streets of Paris, Ngannou found his way to a boxing club where he met coach Didier Carmont (cousin of Francis Carmont) who was understanding toward his situation. Carmont convinced the gym to let him train at no cost and introduced Ngannou to the sport of MMA. Additionally, Ngannou became a volunteer at Lo Chorba, a non-profit organization in Paris. When his boxing gym closed for the summer, Lo Chorba's director, Khater Yenbou, introduced Ngannou to Fernand Lopez and the MMA factory. Being a fan of Mike Tyson, Ngannou was originally interested in learning how to box but Lopez saw his potential in MMA and convinced him to try MMA instead. Lopez gave Ngannou some MMA gear and allowed him to train and sleep at the gym for no cost thus starting Ngannou's MMA career.

Reflecting on his journey across continents and his decision to become an MMA fighter, Ngannou said:

When I started, I had nothing. Nothing. I needed everything. But when you start [to earn money], you starting collecting things: I want this, I want this, I want that. The purpose is not collecting things, though. The purpose is to do something great. Finish the dream you started. I want to help my family, first, of course, but then I want to give opportunity to children in my country like me who have a dream to become a doctor or something. If I reach my dream, it will give me the opportunity to help those in my country who have their own dreams and nothing else to fulfill them.

== Professional mixed martial arts career ==
=== Early career ===
Ngannou started his MMA career in November 2013 and fought mostly in the French promotion 100% Fight, as well as other regional promotions in Europe. At the time, MMA competitions were prohibited in France, and fighters instead competed under "Pancrase" rules, which prohibited ground strikes and the use of a cage, instead of the Unified Rules used by most promotions globally. He compiled a record of 5–1 before signing with the UFC.

=== Ultimate Fighting Championship ===
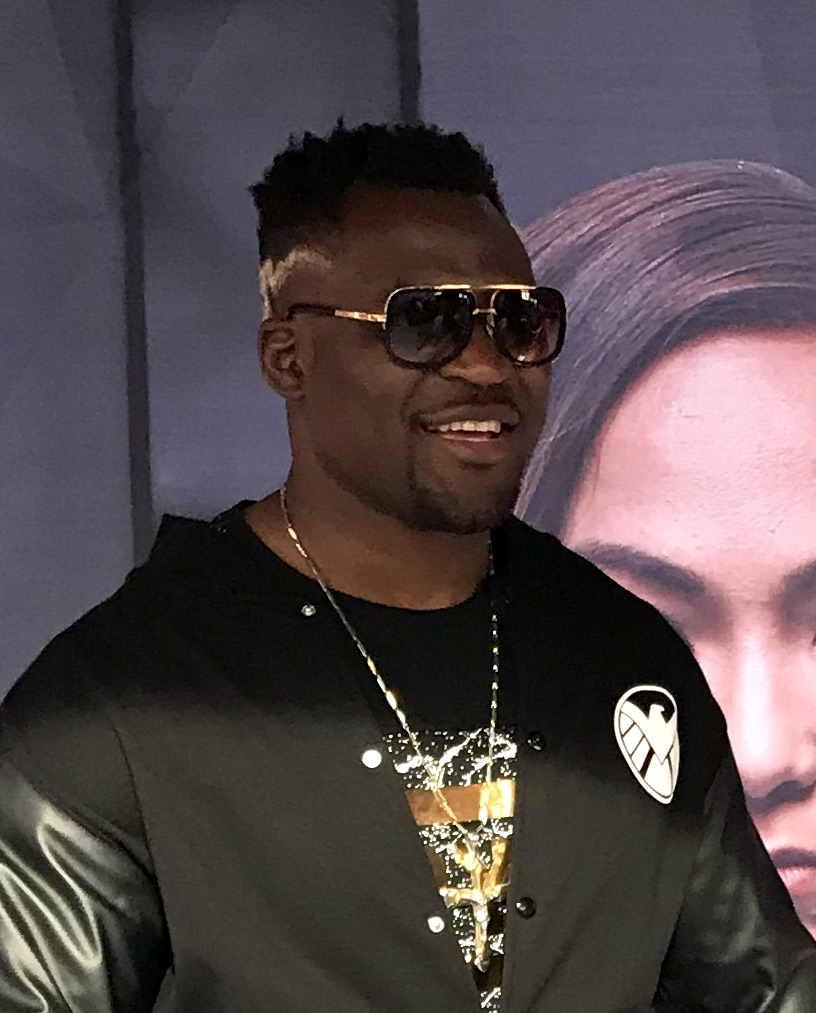
Ngannou in 2017

Ngannou made his UFC debut against fellow newcomer Luis Henrique on 19 December 2015, at UFC on Fox 17. He won the fight via knockout in the second round.

Ngannou next faced UFC newcomer Curtis Blaydes on 10 April 2016, at UFC Fight Night 86. He won the fight via TKO, due to doctor stoppage at the end of the second round.

In his next bout, Ngannou faced another newcomer in Bojan Mihajlović on 23 July 2016, at UFC on Fox 20. He won the fight via TKO in the first round. Ngannou then faced Anthony Hamilton on 9 December 2016, at UFC Fight Night 102. He won the fight by submission in the first round, and earned his first UFC Performance of the Night bonus.

Ngannou faced Andrei Arlovski on 28 January 2017, at UFC on Fox 23. He won the fight via TKO in the first round. The win also earned Ngannou his second Performance of the Night bonus.

Ngannou was expected to face Junior dos Santos on 9 September 2017, at UFC 215. However, on 18 August, Dos Santos was pulled from the match after being notified of a potential USADA violation. In turn, Ngannou was removed from the card after promotion officials deemed that a suitable opponent could not be arranged.

In 2017, he set the world record for the hardest punch ever recorded on the PowerKube, at 129,161 franklin (a unit used by the PowerKube that combines power and energy).

In the highest profile fight of his career, Ngannou faced veteran Alistair Overeem on 2 December 2017, at UFC 218. He won the fight via knockout in the first round. This knockout has been labeled as one of the greatest and most brutal knockouts of all time. Following the bout, Ngannou signed a new, eight-fight contract with the UFC.

Ngannou faced Stipe Miocic for the UFC Heavyweight Championship on 20 January 2018, at UFC 220. He lost the fight via unanimous decision.

Ngannou faced Derrick Lewis on 7 July 2018, at UFC 226. He lost the fight via unanimous decision. The fight was heavily criticized by the media and the fans for the lack of offence from both competitors and was labeled as a "snoozefest".

Ngannou faced Curtis Blaydes in a rematch on 24 November 2018, in the main event at UFC Fight Night 141. He won the fight via TKO early into the first round. The win also earned him a Performance of the Night bonus.

Ngannou headlined the UFC's inaugural event on ESPN, UFC on ESPN 1 against Cain Velasquez on 17 February 2019. He won via knockout in the first round.

Ngannou faced Junior dos Santos on 29 June 2019, at UFC on ESPN 3. He won the fight via technical knockout in the first round. This fight earned him the Performance of the Night award.

Ngannou was scheduled to face Jairzinho Rozenstruik on 28 March 2020, at UFC on ESPN: Ngannou vs. Rozenstruik. Due to the COVID-19 pandemic, the event was eventually postponed . The pair was rescheduled to meet at 18 April 2020, at UFC 249. However, on 9 April, Dana White, the president of the UFC announced that the event was postponed and the bout eventually took place on 9 May 2020. Ngannou won via knockout just 20 seconds into the first round. This win earned him the Performance of the Night award.

==== UFC Heavyweight Champion ====
===== Miocic vs. Ngannou II =====
A rematch of the bout between Miocic and Ngannou for the UFC Heavyweight Championship took place on 27 March 2021, at UFC 260. Ngannou won via knockout in the second round. This win earned him the Performance of the Night award.

===== Ngannou vs. Gane =====
Ngannou faced the Interim UFC Heavyweight Champion Ciryl Gane for his first title defense on 22 January 2022, at UFC 270. He injured knee ligaments three and a half weeks before the fight. Ngannou won the fight by unanimous decision, the first decision win of his career.

==== Departure ====
On 14 January 2023, the UFC Heavyweight Championship was stripped from Ngannou after he and the UFC could not come to terms on a new contract. Ngannou's contract expired in mid-December, and after the two parties couldn't reach an agreement, the UFC waived its one-year matching rights clause, making Ngannou an unrestricted free agent. In an interview with Ariel Helwani, Ngannou stated that he had requested health insurance, the ability to have sponsorships for all UFC fighters, and to have a fighter advocate present during all fighter contract negotiations. When his requests were denied, Ngannou chose not to re-sign with the UFC, making him the first reigning champion to leave the UFC since B.J. Penn in 2004.

After Ngannou's departure from the UFC, he openly admitted to wanting to start a boxing career and targeted boxing matches with both Deontay Wilder and Tyson Fury.

=== Professional Fighters League ===
On 16 May 2023, it was announced that Ngannou had signed a multi-fight deal with the Professional Fighters League (PFL). He competed in their pay-per-view "super fight" division, while still being free to compete in other sports such as boxing. Ngannou also negotiated on behalf of his opponents, guaranteeing them to be paid at least $2 million. He will also be a part of PFL's global advisory board, meant to advocate for fighters' interests, and an equity owner and chairman of the upcoming PFL Africa league. Ngannou's PFL contract has been called a historic moment for the sport, with Daniel Cormier saying it sets "a new standard for what is out there in the [MMA] free-agent market." John S. Nash of Bloody Elbow and Alex Pattle of The Independent each referred to a different aspect of the deal as "unprecedented".

On 22 February 2024, it was announced that Ngannou would make his MMA return against the winner of Renan Ferreira vs Ryan Bader heavyweight bout at PFL vs. Bellator on 24 February 2024 in Riyadh, Saudi Arabia.

Ngannou faced 2023 PFL Heavyweight Champion and PFL Champions vs. Bellator Champions title holder Renan Ferreira for the PFL Super Fights Heavyweight Championship on 19 October 2024 at PFL Super Fights: Battle of the Giants. He won the fight by knockout via ground punches in the first round.

On March 6, 2026, it was announced that Ngannou was no longer under contract with PFL.

=== Most Valuable Promotions ===
Ngannou faced Philipe Lins in a five-round bout at MVP MMA 1, on May 16, 2026. He won the bout via knockout in the first round.

== Professional boxing career ==
=== Ngannou vs. Fury ===
Ngannou took on the undefeated WBC and Lineal heavyweight champion Tyson Fury in a professional boxing match billed as "Battle of the Baddest" on 28 October 2023, in Riyadh, Saudi Arabia. Ngannou was able to knock down Fury in the third round, taking the fight all the way to the scorecards, in which the judges awarded Fury the victory in a controversial split decision (95–94, 96–93, 94–95). According to CompuBox, Fury outlanded Ngannou 71 to 59 in total punches, while Ngannou outlanded Fury 37 to 32 in power punches.

As a result of his strong performance against Fury, Ngannou was ranked #10 by the WBC. Mauricio Sulaiman, president of the WBC, said "the ranking of Ngannou was perfectly supported by the WBC rules which is clear in the criteria from rankings that we consider the activity of the fighter in other contact sports."

=== Ngannou vs. Joshua ===
Ngannou faced Anthony Joshua on 8 March 2024 in Riyadh, Saudi Arabia, and lost by second-round knockout.

== Fighting style ==
Ngannou is an orthodox heavyweight striker best known for his punching power and knockout finishing ability. At 6 ft 4 in with an 83 in reach, he uses his size and length to keep opponents at the edge of punching range, where short counters and sudden forward attacks carry significant finishing threat. His stand-up game is not based on high-volume combination punching; instead, he often fights at a measured pace, drawing opponents forward before countering with heavy hooks, uppercuts or straight punches.

Although Ngannou's reputation is built mainly on striking, his later MMA career also showed improvements in defensive wrestling and top control. In his rematch with Stipe Miocic, he defended early wrestling attempts before winning by knockout, and against Ciryl Gane he retained the UFC heavyweight title by using takedowns and control rather than relying only on power punching. In grappling exchanges, his approach is generally practical rather than submission-oriented, using strength, balance, sprawls, clinch control and ground-and-pound to return the fight to favorable positions.

== Personal life ==
Ngannou speaks Ghomala', French, and English. He learned English after joining the UFC.

On April 29, 2024, Ngannou announced that his 15-month-old son Kobe had died. The cause of death was a brain malformation.

In April 2025, Ngannou was reportedly involved in a motorcycle accident in Yaoundé, Cameroon, that resulted in the death of a 17-year-old girl, Ntsama Brigitte Manuella. The incident occurred over Easter weekend in the Omnisports neighborhood. Ngannou allegedly transported the girl to Yaoundé General Hospital and covered her medical expenses. Despite undergoing emergency surgery, she died from her injuries.

== Philanthropy ==
The Francis Ngannou Foundation, initially run solely on Ngannou's personal funds and later combining that with donations, runs the first MMA gym in Cameroon, aiming to offer facilities for young people to have a place to train. It also donates educational materials to Cameroonian children and schools, including setting up computer labs in underserved villages. In January 2024 the foundation claimed to have 26,000 beneficiaries.

== Filmography ==
=== Film ===
Year	Title	Role	Notes
2021	F9	Ferocious Professional	Cameo
2022	Jackass Forever	Himself	Guest appearance
2023	Rebel Moon: Part One	Male Gladiator	Cameo

== Championships and accomplishments ==
- Ultimate Fighting Championship
  - UFC Heavyweight Championship (One time)
    - One successful title defense
  - First Cameroon-born UFC champion
  - Performance of the Night (Six times) vs. Anthony Hamilton, Andrei Arlovski, Curtis Blaydes, Junior dos Santos, Jairzinho Rozenstruik and Stipe Miocic
  - Tied (Andrei Arlovski, Gabriel Gonzaga & Stefan Struve) for third most finishes in UFC Heavyweight division history (11)
  - Tied (Terrance McKinney, Michał Oleksiejczuk, Joe Lauzon and Donald Cerrone) for sixth most first-round finishes in UFC history (8)
  - Tied (Cain Velasquez & Junior Dos Santos) for second most knockouts in UFC Heavyweight division history (10)
  - Tied for fourth most consecutive knockouts in UFC history (5)
  - Holds wins over five former UFC champions — vs. Andrei Arlovski, Cain Velasquez, Junior dos Santos, Stipe Miocic 2 and Ciryl Gane
  - UFC.com Awards
    - 2016: Ranked #10 Submission of the Year vs. Anthony Hamilton
    - 2017: Knockout of the Year vs. Alistair Overeem
    - 2021: Ranked #6 Knockout of the Year vs. Stipe Miocic 2
- Professional Fighters League
  - PFL Super Fights Heavyweight Championship (One time, inaugural)
- Bleacher Report
  - 2017 Knockout of the Year vs. Alistair Overeem
- ESPN
  - 2017 Knockout of the Year vs. Alistair Overeem
  - 2024 Non-UFC Male Fighter of the Year
- CBS Sports
  - 2017 UFC Knockout of the Year vs. Alistair Overeem
- Yahoo Sports
  - 2017 Knockout of the Year vs. Alistair Overeem at UFC 218
- Pundit Arena
  - 2017 Knockout of the Year vs. Alistair Overeem
- MMA Fighting
  - 2017 Knockout of the Year vs. Alistair Overeem
  - 2017 Breakthrough Fighter of the Year
- MMA Junkie
  - 2017 Knockout of the Year vs. Alistair Overeem
  - 2021 March Knockout of the Month vs. Stipe Miocic
  - 2024 Comeback Fighter of the Year
- MMADNA.nl
  - 2017 Knockout of the Year
- World MMA Awards
  - 2017 Knockout of the Year vs. Alistair Overeem at UFC 218
- Fight Matrix
  - 2021 Most Noteworthy Match of the Year vs. Stipe Miocic at UFC 260
  - 2024 Comeback Fighter of the Year
- Combat Press
  - 2017 Knockout of the Year vs. Alistair Overeem at UFC 218
  - 2024 Comeback Fighter of the Year
- Cageside Press
  - 2017 Knockout of the Year vs. Alistair Overeem at UFC 218
- MMA Sucka
  - 2017 Knockout of the Year vs. Alistair Overeem at UFC 218
- Slacky Awards
  - 2021 Gameplan of the Year vs. Stipe Miocic 2 at UFC 260
  - World record for the hardest punch

== Mixed martial arts record ==
Professional record breakdown
22 matches	19 wins	3 losses
By knockout	14	0
By submission	4	0
By decision	1	3

Res.	Record	Opponent	Method	Event	Date	Round	Time	Location	Notes
Win	19–3	Philipe Lins	KO (punch)	MVP MMA: Rousey vs. Carano	16 May 2026	1	4:31	Inglewood, California, United States	Performance of the Night.
Win	18–3	Renan Ferreira	KO (punches)	PFL Super Fights: Battle of the Giants	19 October 2024	1	3:32	Riyadh, Saudi Arabia	Won the symbolic PFL Super Fights Heavyweight Championship.
Win	17–3	Ciryl Gane	Decision (unanimous)	UFC 270	22 January 2022	5	5:00	Anaheim, California, United States	Defended and unified the UFC Heavyweight Championship. Title later vacated when Ngannou's contract expired.
Win	16–3	Stipe Miocic	KO (punch)	UFC 260	27 March 2021	2	0:52	Las Vegas, Nevada, United States	Won the UFC Heavyweight Championship. Performance of the Night.
Win	15–3	Jairzinho Rozenstruik	KO (punches)	UFC 249	9 May 2020	1	0:20	Jacksonville, Florida, United States	Performance of the Night.
Win	14–3	Junior dos Santos	TKO (punches)	UFC on ESPN: Ngannou vs. dos Santos	29 June 2019	1	1:11	Minneapolis, Minnesota, United States	Performance of the Night.
Win	13–3	Cain Velasquez	KO (punches)	UFC on ESPN: Ngannou vs. Velasquez	17 February 2019	1	0:26	Phoenix, Arizona, United States	
Win	12–3	Curtis Blaydes	TKO (punches)	UFC Fight Night: Blaydes vs. Ngannou 2	24 November 2018	1	0:45	Beijing, China	Performance of the Night.
Loss	11–3	Derrick Lewis	Decision (unanimous)	UFC 226	7 July 2018	3	5:00	Las Vegas, Nevada, United States	
Loss	11–2	Stipe Miocic	Decision (unanimous)	UFC 220	20 January 2018	5	5:00	Boston, Massachusetts, United States	For the UFC Heavyweight Championship.
Win	11–1	Alistair Overeem	KO (punch)	UFC 218	2 December 2017	1	1:42	Detroit, Michigan, United States	UFC Heavyweight title eliminator. Knockout of the Year.
Win	10–1	Andrei Arlovski	TKO (punches)	UFC on Fox: Shevchenko vs. Peña	28 January 2017	1	1:32	Denver, Colorado, United States	Performance of the Night.
Win	9–1	Anthony Hamilton	Submission (kimura)	UFC Fight Night: Lewis vs. Abdurakhimov	9 December 2016	1	1:57	Albany, New York, United States	Performance of the Night.
Win	8–1	Bojan Mihajlović	TKO (punches)	UFC on Fox: Holm vs. Shevchenko	23 July 2016	1	1:34	Chicago, Illinois, United States	
Win	7–1	Curtis Blaydes	TKO (doctor stoppage)	UFC Fight Night: Rothwell vs. dos Santos	10 April 2016	2	5:00	Zagreb, Croatia	
Win	6–1	Luis Henrique	KO (punch)	UFC on Fox: dos Anjos vs. Cowboy 2	19 December 2015	2	2:53	Orlando, Florida, United States	
Win	5–1	William Baldutti	TKO (punches)	KHK MMA National Tryouts: Finale 2015	28 May 2015	2	1:22	Isa Town, Bahrain	
Win	4–1	Luc Ngeleka	Submission (guillotine choke)	Strength and Honor 10	20 September 2014	1	0:44	Geneva, Switzerland	
Win	3–1	Nicolas Specq	Submission (arm-triangle choke)	100% Fight 20	5 April 2014	2	2:10	Levallois-Perret, France	
Win	2–1	Bilal Tahtahi	KO (punch)	100% Fight 20	5 April 2014	1	3:58	Levallois-Perret, France	
Loss	1–1	Zoumana Cisse	Decision (unanimous)	100% Fight: Contenders 21	14 December 2013	2	5:00	Paris, France	
Win	1–0	Rachid Benzina	Submission (armbar)	100% Fight: Contenders 20	30 November 2013	1	1:44	Paris, France	Heavyweight debut.

== Professional boxing record ==
2 fights	0 wins	2 losses
By knockout	0	1
By decision	0	1

No.	Result	Record	Opponent	Type	Round, time	Date	Location	Notes
2	Loss	0–2	Anthony Joshua	KO	2 (10), 2:38	8 Mar 2024	Kingdom Arena, Riyadh, Saudi Arabia	
1	Loss	0–1	Tyson Fury	SD	10	28 Oct 2023	Kingdom Arena, Riyadh, Saudi Arabia	

== Kickboxing record ==
Kickboxing record
1 Win, 0 Losses
Date	Result	Opponent	Event	Location	Method	Round	Time	Record
2015-06-19	Win	Farid Nair	Carcharias	Perpignan, France	Decision	3	3:00	1–0
Legend: Win Loss Draw/No contest Notes

== Pay-per-view bouts ==
=== MMA ===
No.	Event	Fight	Date	Venue	City	PPV Buys
1.	UFC 220	Miocic vs. Ngannou	20 January 2018	TD Garden	Boston, Massachusetts United States	350,000
2.	UFC 260	Miocic vs. Ngannou 2	27 March 2021	UFC Apex	Las Vegas, Nevada, United States	500,000
3.	UFC 270	Ngannou vs. Gane	22 January 2022	Honda Center	Anaheim, California, United States	300,000
4.	PFL SF: Battle of the Giants	Ngannou vs. Ferreira	19 October 2024	The Mayadeen	Riyadh, Saudi Arabia	Not Disclosed

=== Boxing ===
No.	Billing	Fight	Date	Venue	Buys	Network	Revenue
1	Battle of the Baddest	Fury vs. Ngannou	28 October 2023	Kingdom Arena	N/A	DAZN / ESPN+	Not Disclosed
2	Knockout Chaos	Joshua vs. Ngannou	8 March 2024	Kingdom Arena	N/A	DAZN / Sky Sports Box Office	Not Disclosed

== See also ==
- List of male boxers
- List of male mixed martial artists
- List of mixed martial artists with professional boxing records
- List of multi-sport athletes

Achievements
Preceded by Stipe Miocic	22nd UFC Heavyweight Champion; 27 March 2021 – 14 January 2023; Stripped	Vacant Title next held by Jon Jones
New title	1st PFL Super Fights Heavyweight Champion; October 19, 2024 – present	Incumbent
