= Curtis Blaydes =

American mixed martial artist and graduated Folkstyle wrestler (born 1991)

- Blaydes in 2018
- Born: Curtis Lionell Blaydes; February 18, 1991 (age 35); Naperville, Illinois, U.S.
- Other names: Razor
- Height: 6 ft 4 in (193 cm)
- Weight: 261 lb (118 kg; 18 st 9 lb)
- Division: Heavyweight
- Reach: 80 in (203 cm)
- Fighting out of: Chicago, Illinois, U.S.
- Team: Dutch Style MMA (until 2016); UFC Gym Lombard (formerly); Elevation Fight Team (2016–present)
- Rank: Purple belt in Brazilian Jiu-Jitsu under Cody Donovan
- Wrestling: NJCAA Wrestling
- Years active: 2014–present

Mixed martial arts record
- Total: 27
- Wins: 20
- By knockout: 13
- By decision: 7
- Losses: 6
- By knockout: 5
- By decision: 1
- No contests: 1

Other information
- Mixed martial arts record from Sherdog

Curtis Lionell Blaydes (born February 18, 1991) is an American professional mixed martial artist. He currently competes in the Heavyweight division of the Ultimate Fighting Championship (UFC). A professional since 2014, Blaydes formerly competed for the Resurrection Fighting Alliance (RFA). As of November 7, 2026, he is #7 in the Meta UFC heavyweight rankings.

== Background ==
Blaydes was born in Naperville, Illinois, and raised in nearby Chicago along with his four other siblings. He began wrestling for the De La Salle Institute, winning a state title his senior year while also compiling an undefeated 44–0 record. During his four years, Blaydes compiled an overall record of 95–18 with 121 takedowns. Blaydes also played American football for De La Salle as a defensive end. He later earned a full wrestling scholarship to Northern Illinois University. After going 9–2 as a redshirt freshman at NIU, he transferred to Harper College. At Harper, Blaydes won the NJCAA National Championship as a redshirt sophomore. After he began fighting in amateur mixed martial arts, Blaydes left school to focus on a career in MMA.

Blaydes was an IKF amateur champion.

== Mixed martial arts career ==
=== Early career ===
Blaydes compiled an 8–0 amateur record before turning professional in 2014. He then went 5–0, with all wins via TKO, before being signed by the UFC.

=== Ultimate Fighting Championship ===
Blaydes made his promotional debut against Francis Ngannou on April 10, 2016, at UFC Fight Night 86. He lost the fight via TKO at the conclusion of the second round due to doctor stoppage.

Blaydes next faced Cody East on October 1, 2016, at UFC Fight Night 96. He won the fight via TKO in the second round, winning his first UFC Performance of the Night bonus.

Blaydes faced Adam Milstead on February 4, 2017, at UFC Fight Night 104. After dominating the action throughout the first round, Blaydes won the fight via TKO after Milstead sustained a knee injury. Subsequently, the result was changed to a No Contest after Blaydes tested positive for marijuana.

Blaydes faced Daniel Omielańczuk on July 8, 2017, at UFC 213. He won the fight by unanimous decision.

Blaydes faced Alexey Oleynik on November 4, 2017, at UFC 217. He won the fight via TKO due to a doctor stoppage. The referee stopped the fight after Blaydes delivered an illegal kick to a downed opponent and called a doctor to check on Oliynyk. The fight was stopped due to the doctor's advice. The replay, however, showed the strike did not deliver significant damage (as it only grazed the ear), and the fight was ruled a win for Blaydes.

Blaydes faced Mark Hunt on February 11, 2018, at UFC 221. He won the fight via unanimous decision.

Blaydes faced Alistair Overeem on June 9, 2018, at UFC 225. He won the fight via TKO due to elbows in the third round. This win earned him the Performance of the Night bonus.

Blaydes faced Francis Ngannou in a rematch on November 24, 2018, in the main event at UFC Fight Night 141 He lost the fight via TKO early into the first round.

Blaydes faced Justin Willis on March 23, 2019, at UFC Fight Night 148. Blaydes continually took Willis down, scoring multiple takedowns and knocking down Willis in the second round winning the fight via unanimous decision.

Blaydes faced Shamil Abdurakhimov on September 7, 2019, at UFC 242. He won the fight via TKO in the second round.

Blaydes faced Junior dos Santos on January 25, 2020, at UFC Fight Night 166. He won the fight via technical knockout in the second round.

Blaydes faced Alexander Volkov on June 20, 2020, at UFC on ESPN 11. He won the fight via unanimous decision (49–46, 48–47, and 48–46).

Blaydes was scheduled to face Derrick Lewis on November 28, 2020, at UFC on ESPN: Blaydes vs. Lewis. However, he tested positive for coronavirus and thus, the bout was scrapped. The pair was rescheduled for UFC Fight Night 185 on February 20, 2021. Blaydes lost the fight via knockout in the second round. He became a free agent after fighting out his contract, and signed a new four-fight deal with the UFC in May.

Blaydes faced Jairzinho Rozenstruik on September 25, 2021, at UFC 266. Blaydes won the fight via unanimous decision.

Blaydes faced Chris Daukaus on March 26, 2022, at UFC on ESPN 33. He won the fight via TKO early in the second round. The win also earned him the Performance of the Night award.

Blaydes faced Tom Aspinall on July 23, 2022, at UFC Fight Night 208. Blaydes won the fight via TKO after Aspinall suffered a knee injury and was unable to defend himself in the opening minute of the fight.

Blaydes faced Sergei Pavlovich on April 22, 2023, at UFC Fight Night 222. He lost the fight via technical knockout in the first round.

Blaydes was scheduled to face Jailton Almeida on November 4, 2023, at UFC Fight Night 231. However, Blaydes withdrew for unknown reasons and was replaced by Derrick Lewis. The pair was rescheduled for UFC 299 on March 9, 2024. After being taken down nine times in round one, Blaydes won the fight by technical knockout in round two. This fight earned him another Performance of the Night award.

Blaydes faced Tom Aspinall in a rematch for the Interim UFC Heavyweight Championship on July 27, 2024, at UFC 304. He lost the fight by knockout one minute into the first round.

Blaydes was scheduled to face Rizvan Kuniev on February 22, 2025, at UFC Fight Night 252. However, the bout was moved to March 8, 2025, at UFC 313 for unknown reasons. A few hours before the event took place, Blaydes withdrew due to an undisclosed illness and the bout was scrapped. The bout was rescheduled for May 17, 2025 at UFC Fight Night 256. In turn, the bout was moved once again and eventually took place on June 21, 2025, at UFC on ABC 8. Blaydes won the fight by split decision. 11 out of 13 media sources scored the fight in favor of Kuniev.

Blaydes faced Josh Hokit on April 11, 2026, at UFC 327. Blaydes lost the bout by unanimous decision in what several media outlets described as a Fight of the Year contender. This fight earned him a $100,000 Fight of the Night award. Blaydes set a UFC record with Hokit for most combined significant strikes in a UFC heavyweight bout, landing 174 of the 351 total.

Blaydes was scheduled to face Waldo Cortes-Acosta on September 19, 2026, at UFC 331. However, the bout was shifted to one week prior to September 12, 2026, at UFC Fight Night 288. Blaydes won the fight by unanimous decision.

== Personal life ==
Blaydes has a daughter.

== Championships and accomplishments ==
=== Mixed martial arts ===
- Ultimate Fighting Championship
  - Fight of the Night (One time) vs. Josh Hokit
  - Performance of the Night (Four times) vs. Cody East, Alistair Overeem, Chris Daukaus and Jailton Almeida
  - Most takedowns landed in UFC Heavyweight division history (70)
  - Most control time in UFC Heavyweight division history (1:31:19)
  - Most top position time in UFC Heavyweight division history (1:08:36)
  - Tied (Junior dos Santos & Alexander Volkov) for fourth most wins in UFC Heavyweight division history (14)
  - UFC Heavyweight Bout Records
  - Most takedowns landed (14) (vs. Alexander Volkov)
    - Second most takedowns attempted (25) (vs. Alexander Volkov)
    - Tied (Jake O'Brien) for third most takedowns landed (10) (vs. Mark Hunt)
    - Highest takedown accuracy percentage (80%) (vs. Adam Milstead. Min. 10 takedown attempts)
    - Fourth highest takedown accuracy percentage (71.4%) (vs. Mark Hunt. Min. 10 takedown attempts)
  - Second most significant strikes landed in a three-round bout (174) (vs. Josh Hokit)
    - Third most significant strikes landed in any UFC Heavyweight bout (174) (vs. Josh Hokit)
    - Third most significant strikes attempted (302) (vs. Josh Hokit)
    - Third most significant clinch strikes landed (60) (vs. Josh Hokit)
    - Fourth most significant head strikes landed (151) (vs. Josh Hokit)
    - Third most total strikes attempted (60) (vs. Josh Hokit)
    - Fifth most total head strikes landed (180) (vs. Josh Hokit)

=== Folkstyle wrestling ===
- National Junior College Athletic Association
  - NJCAA Heavyweight National Championship out of Harper College (2012)
  - NJCAA All-American out of Harper College (2012)

== Mixed martial arts record ==
Professional record breakdown
27 matches	20 wins	6 losses
By knockout	13	5
By decision	7	1
No contests	1	

Res.	Record	Opponent	Method	Event	Date	Round	Time	Location	Notes
Win	20–6 (1)	Waldo Cortes-Acosta	Decision (unanimous)	UFC Fight Night: Silva vs. Delgado	September 12, 2026	3	5:00	Glendale, Arizona, United States	
Loss	19–6 (1)	Josh Hokit	Decision (unanimous)	UFC 327	April 11, 2026	3	5:00	Miami, Florida, United States	Fight of the Night.
Win	19–5 (1)	Rizvan Kuniev	Decision (split)	UFC on ABC: Hill vs. Rountree Jr.	June 21, 2025	3	5:00	Baku, Azerbaijan	
Loss	18–5 (1)	Tom Aspinall	KO (punches)	UFC 304	July 27, 2024	1	1:00	Manchester, England	For the interim UFC Heavyweight Championship.
Win	18–4 (1)	Jailton Almeida	KO (punches)	UFC 299	March 9, 2024	2	0:36	Miami, Florida, United States	Performance of the Night.
Loss	17–4 (1)	Sergei Pavlovich	TKO (punches)	UFC Fight Night: Pavlovich vs. Blaydes	April 22, 2023	1	3:08	Las Vegas, Nevada, United States	
Win	17–3 (1)	Tom Aspinall	TKO (knee injury)	UFC Fight Night: Blaydes vs. Aspinall	July 23, 2022	1	0:15	London, England	
Win	16–3 (1)	Chris Daukaus	TKO (punches)	UFC on ESPN: Blaydes vs. Daukaus	March 26, 2022	2	0:17	Columbus, Ohio, United States	Performance of the Night.
Win	15–3 (1)	Jairzinho Rozenstruik	Decision (unanimous)	UFC 266	September 25, 2021	3	5:00	Las Vegas, Nevada, United States	
Loss	14–3 (1)	Derrick Lewis	KO (punch)	UFC Fight Night: Blaydes vs. Lewis	February 20, 2021	2	1:26	Las Vegas, Nevada, United States	
Win	14–2 (1)	Alexander Volkov	Decision (unanimous)	UFC on ESPN: Blaydes vs. Volkov	June 20, 2020	5	5:00	Las Vegas, Nevada, United States	
Win	13–2 (1)	Junior dos Santos	TKO (punches)	UFC Fight Night: Blaydes vs. dos Santos	January 25, 2020	2	1:06	Raleigh, North Carolina, United States	
Win	12–2 (1)	Shamil Abdurakhimov	TKO (elbow and punch)	UFC 242	September 7, 2019	2	2:22	Abu Dhabi, United Arab Emirates	
Win	11–2 (1)	Justin Willis	Decision (unanimous)	UFC Fight Night: Thompson vs. Pettis	March 23, 2019	3	5:00	Nashville, Tennessee, United States	
Loss	10–2 (1)	Francis Ngannou	TKO (punches)	UFC Fight Night: Blaydes vs. Ngannou 2	November 24, 2018	1	0:45	Beijing, China	
Win	10–1 (1)	Alistair Overeem	TKO (elbows)	UFC 225	June 9, 2018	3	2:56	Chicago, Illinois, United States	Performance of the Night.
Win	9–1 (1)	Mark Hunt	Decision (unanimous)	UFC 221	February 11, 2018	3	5:00	Perth, Australia	
Win	8–1 (1)	Aleksei Oleinik	TKO (doctor stoppage)	UFC 217	November 4, 2017	2	1:56	New York City, New York, United States	
Win	7–1 (1)	Daniel Omielańczuk	Decision (unanimous)	UFC 213	July 8, 2017	3	5:00	Las Vegas, Nevada, United States	
NC	6–1 (1)	Adam Milstead	NC (overturned)	UFC Fight Night: Bermudez vs. The Korean Zombie	February 4, 2017	2	0:59	Houston, Texas, United States	Originally a TKO (knee injury) win for Blaydes; overturned after he tested positive for marijuana.
Win	6–1	Cody East	TKO (elbows)	UFC Fight Night: Lineker vs. Dodson	October 1, 2016	2	2:02	Portland, Oregon, United States	Performance of the Night.
Loss	5–1	Francis Ngannou	TKO (doctor stoppage)	UFC Fight Night: Rothwell vs. dos Santos	April 10, 2016	2	5:00	Zagreb, Croatia	
Win	5–0	Luis Cortez	TKO (punches)	RFA 35	February 19, 2016	3	0:41	Orem, Utah, United States	
Win	4–0	Allen Crowder	TKO (punches)	Battle in the South 10	April 10, 2015	2	N/A	Wilmington, North Carolina, United States	
Win	3–0	Brad Faylor	TKO (punches)	Sugar Creek Showdown 23	November 15, 2014	2	0:45	Hinton, Oklahoma, United States	
Win	2–0	William Baptiste	TKO (punches)	XFO 53	October 11, 2014	1	2:14	Chicago, Illinois, United States	
Win	1–0	Lorenzo Hood	TKO (doctor stoppage)	XFO 51	May 31, 2014	1	1:42	Chicago, Illinois, United States	Heavyweight debut.

== See also ==
- List of male mixed martial artists
- List of current UFC fighters
