= Alistair Overeem =

Dutch mixed martial artist (born 1980)

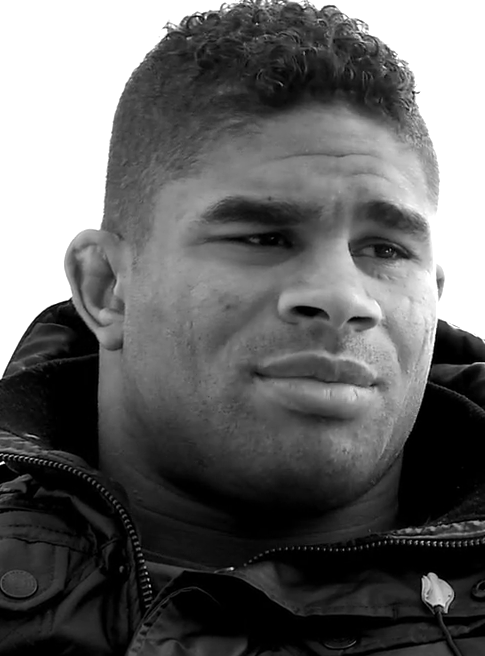
- Overeem in 2010
- Born: Alistair Cees Overeem; 17 May 1980 (age 46); Hounslow, London, England
- Other names: The Demolition Man
- Nationality: Dutch
- Height: 6 ft 4 in (193 cm)
- Weight: 256 lb (116 kg; 18 st 4 lb)
- Division: Heavyweight (2006, 2007–2022); Light Heavyweight (1999–2007)
- Reach: 80 in (203 cm)
- Style: Kickboxing, Submission wrestling
- Stance: Orthodox
- Fighting out of: Amsterdam, Netherlands
- Team: Hemmers Gym (2021–2022); Elevation Fight Team (2018–2021); Jackson Wink MMA Academy (2014–2018); Blackzilians (2012–2013); Golden Glory (2007–2011)
- Teachers: Chris Dolman, Lucien Carbin
- Trainer: Nick Hemmers (2021–2022); Eliot Marshall (2018–2021); Greg Jackson (2014–2018); Mike Winkeljohn (2014–2018); Henri Hooft (2012–2013); Cor Hemmers (2007–2011); Martijn de Jong (1999–2011); Lucien Carbin (1999–2007); Chris Dolman (1996–1999)
- Rank: Blue belt in Brazilian Jiu-Jitsu under Joaquim Valente, Gui Valente and Pedro Valente
- Years active: 1999–2022

Kickboxing record
- Total: 15
- Wins: 10
- By knockout: 7
- Losses: 4
- By knockout: 3
- No contests: 1

Mixed martial arts record
- Total: 67
- Wins: 47
- By knockout: 25
- By submission: 17
- By decision: 5
- Losses: 19
- By knockout: 15
- By submission: 1
- By decision: 3
- No contests: 1

Other information
- Notable relatives: Valentijn (brother)
- Website: www.alistairovereem.com
- Mixed martial arts record from Sherdog
- Last updated on: 9 October 2022

Alistair Cees Overeem (born 17 May 1980) is a Dutch former professional mixed martial artist and kickboxer. He is a former Strikeforce Heavyweight Champion, Dream Heavyweight Champion, K-1 World Grand Prix Champion, and was the first fighter to hold world titles in MMA and K-1 kickboxing at the same time. Overeem is also a one-time challenger for the UFC Heavyweight Championship.

Overeem holds the UFC all-time record for highest significant strike accuracy in the promotion's history (74.3%).

== Biography ==
Overeem was born in Hounslow, London, England, to a Jamaican father and a Dutch mother, whose maternal great-grandmother was an illegitimate child of King William III of the Netherlands. When he was six years old, his parents divorced and he moved with his mother and older brother to the Netherlands, where he grew up in the city of Amersfoort. As a child, Overeem started training martial arts with his older brother Valentijn in order to defend himself from bullying. He decided to pursue a competitive sports career by his brother's example, first in judo and later track and field and basketball. At the age of 15, he followed Valentijn into Chris Dolman's Martial Arts gym to become a professional fighter. Alistair initially did not like the sport, as he was routinely beaten by more experienced students, but he changed his mind when he met Bas Rutten and Joop Kasteel, after which he fully dedicated himself to training.

== Mixed martial arts career ==
Overeem had his first MMA professional fight at 19 years old, defeating Ricardo Fyeet by submission on 24 October 1999 at It's Showtime, the first event of the self-titled promotion.

=== Early MMA career ===
After posting a 10–3 record in Fighting Network Rings, M-1, It's Showtime, and 2 Hot 2 Handle, Overeem debuted in the Pride Fighting Championships on 20 July 2002, defeating Yusuke Imamura by TKO in 44 seconds.

=== Pride FC ===
Overeem won two more fights in Pride before entering the 2003 Pride Middleweight Grand Prix at Pride Total Elimination 2003 and losing to future UFC Light heavyweight Champion Chuck Liddell in the quarterfinal match. Overeem rebounded to defeat Tomohiko Hashimoto at the Inoki Bom-Ba-Ye 2003 in 36 seconds. On 31 October 2004, Overeem fought Hiromitsu Kanehara, defeating him by TKO in the second round at Pride 28. Overeem lost his next fight against Brazilian Top Team fighter Antônio Rogério Nogueira.

In 2005, Overeem entered the Pride Middleweight Grand Prix at Pride Total Elimination 2005, in which he defeated UFC Light heavyweight Champion Vitor Belfort by submission in the opening round. Overeem moved on to fight Igor Vovchanchyn in the quarterfinals at Pride Critical Countdown 2005 and won via submission in under two minutes. Overeem lost in the semifinals to the eventual champion Maurício Rua.

In February 2006, Overeem fought Russian Top Team favourite Sergei Kharitonov. Overeem won, dislocating Kharitonov's shoulder in the process. With his win over Kharitonov, Overeem secured a spot in the Pride 2006 Openweight Grand Prix at Pride Total Elimination Absolute. He fought Brazilian jiu-jitsu specialist Fabrício Werdum, and lost via kimura in the second round.

=== Debut in Strikeforce ===
On 9 June 2006, Overeem travelled to San Jose, California, to win a rematch with Vitor Belfort by decision at Strikeforce: Revenge.

=== Return to Pride ===
A month later Overeem returned to Pride for a highly anticipated rematch with Antônio Rogério Nogueira. Overeem entered the fight with a heavily taped neck. After controlling the first round and a half with his striking, Overeem was stumbled from a punch, and Nogueira followed with a flurry of strikes. Worried Overeem would be more severely injured, his corner threw in the towel.

At Pride Final Conflict Absolute, Overeem lost to Ricardo Arona. Overeem was on the receiving end of a leg kick that caused a non-serious injury to his nerves, causing him to lose feeling in his foot and leg. Unable to mount much offence or defend against Arona, Overeem tapped out to avoid further injury.

He then suffered another KO loss to Maurício Rua at Pride 33, but returned in June 2007 with a submission win over Michael Knaap at K-1 Grand Prix in Amsterdam (despite K-1 being a kickboxing promotion, the bout was fought under MMA rules).

On 17 September 2007, at the Hero's 10: Middleweight Tournament Final, Alistair faced Sergei Kharitonov again. Overeem showed solid movement as soon as the first round began, but he suffered a KO loss just before the end of the first round.

=== Return to Strikeforce/DREAM/Dynamite ===
On 16 November 2007, Overeem defeated Paul Buentello for the vacant Strikeforce Heavyweight Championship by submission due to knee strikes. On 15 June 2008 Overeem won by KO in the first round against Lee Tae-Hyun at DREAM 4. On 21 July 2008, Overeem defeated K-1 World Grand Prix Champion Mark Hunt in the first round by submission at Dream 5: Lightweight Grand Prix 2008 Final Round.

His next fight was against Mirko Cro Cop at Dream 6 on 23 September 2008. The bout was stopped about halfway through the first round and declared a no-contest, after Overeem landed multiple knees to the groin of Cro Cop.

Overeem was rumoured to be making his first title defence against Brett Rogers on 6 June at Strikeforce: Lawler vs. Shields. However, a hand injury scuttled plans for the fight. According to Golden Glory manager Bas Boon, Overeem had suffered a hand infection following a nightclub brawl early May 2009. According to Boon, Alistair and his brother Valentijn, both heavyweights had been involved in an altercation that left five security staff needing hospital treatment and nearly cost Alistair his hand.

Overeem was scheduled to make his first Strikeforce Heavyweight Championship defence in a rematch against Fabrício Werdum at Strikeforce: Carano vs. Cyborg, but had to pull out due to a hand injury, most likely caused from his nightclub brawl.

Alistair defeated Tony Sylvester at Golden Glory's 10-year anniversary celebration with a standing guillotine choke. He used the same choke only eight days later to submit James Thompson at Dream 12.

Overeem was set to face Andrei Arlovski at Dynamite!! 2009, but FEG instead opted to have him face Kazuyuki Fujita to keep with the DREAM vs. Sengoku theme. Overeem quickly overpowered his opponent and recorded a knockout with a knee to the head.

Overeem next faced Brett Rogers on 15 May 2010 at Strikeforce: Heavy Artillery to defend his Strikeforce Heavyweight Championship. He won the fight via TKO in the first round. In his post-fight interview, Overeem declared for another time that he wants to fight Fedor Emelianenko, claiming that Fedor's management can no longer ignore his presence. The majority of Alistair Overeem's pre-fight training camp took place at the newly opened Golden Glory Gym in Pattaya, Thailand, where "The Demolition Man" concentrated on the further improvement of his Muay Thai skills.

Overeem faced Todd Duffee on 31 December 2010 at Dynamite!! 2010. He defeated Duffee by way of knockout 19 seconds into the first round to win the interim DREAM Heavyweight Championship.

=== Strikeforce Heavyweight Grand Prix ===
In early 2011, Overeem was named as one of eight men that will take part of the Strikeforce Heavyweight Grand Prix, alongside Fabrício Werdum, Sergei Kharitonov, Brett Rogers, Josh Barnett, Andrei Arlovski, Antônio Silva and Fedor Emelianenko.

A rematch with Fabrício Werdum took place on 18 June 2011, at Strikeforce: Dallas as part of an eight-man heavyweight tournament. Overeem defeated Werdum by unanimous decision (30–27, 30–27, and 29–28).

=== Removal from GP/Strikeforce ===
On 17 July, it was announced that Overeem was removed from the promotion's 2011 Heavyweight Grand Prix. Overeem went on to state that he felt the September date was too soon for him to return, and that he needed time to rest and heal after his 18 June quarterfinal decision win over Fabrício Werdum. Overeem was swapped out for unbeaten up-and-comer Daniel Cormier. Subsequently, on 29 July, it was announced that Overeem had been released from the Strikeforce organization as Zuffa exercised their right to eliminate the one remaining fight on his contract. It was revealed that the reason behind Overeem's release from Strikeforce was not due to his unwillingness to participate in the Grand Prix semi-finals, but due to Golden Glory's policy requiring that the money fighters made through fights be paid through their management first.

This disagreement led not only to Overeem's release but also other Golden Glory stars under a Zuffa contract, including former Strikeforce Women's Bantamweight Champion Marloes Coenen, Norwegian UFC Heavyweight Jon Olav Einemo, and even brother Valentijn Overeem. Team Golden Glory leader Bas Boon stated he has since changed the policy, and that Alistair Overeem could come to the UFC under an exclusive deal if the right terms are offered, which he later received.

=== Ultimate Fighting Championship (2011–2021) ===
After much speculation, on 6 September 2011 it was announced that Overeem had signed a contract with the UFC, and that his first fight would be against former UFC Heavyweight Champion Brock Lesnar on 30 December 2011 at UFC 141.

The lead up to the fight was rife with controversy. In November 2011, both competitors were required by the NSAC to comply with out-of-competition drug testing. Lesnar delivered his sample screen on 21 November, while Overeem delivered his on 23 November. The screen, however, did not meet the standards of the commission. Overeem submitted a second test through his personal physician, which was also deemed unacceptable before flying out of the country. Overeem was ultimately given a conditional license for the fight by the committee during a meeting held on 12 December 2011.

On 30 December 2011, at UFC 141, Overeem made his UFC debut in the main event against Brock Lesnar. Overeem hurt Lesnar multiple times early on with knees to the body, and went on to finish the fight with a kick to the liver and subsequent punches at 2:26 of the first round. The victory earned him a heavyweight title shot against champion Junior dos Santos.

==== Failed drug test ====
Overeem was scheduled to fight UFC Heavyweight Champion Junior dos Santos on 26 May 2012 at UFC 146. However, on 4 April 2012, Overeem was revealed to have failed his pre-fight drug test by the Nevada State Athletic Commission (NSAC). Overeem had a 14-to-1 testosterone-to-epitestosterone (T/E) ratio, over the allowed ratio rate of 6-to-1. On Friday 20 April 2012 UFC President Dana White confirmed that Overeem had been removed from his fight with dos Santos and replaced by Frank Mir.

One day prior to his meeting with the NSAC, Overeem released a prepared statement to the media in which he claims the positive result of the drug test came as a result of a doctor-prescribed "anti-inflammatory medication that was mixed with testosterone." Overeem's lawyer filed a continuation request for additional time to gather support for his recent claim, which was voted on by the NSAC on 24 April 2012. The request was denied and the NSAC voted unanimously to deny Overeem's application status for a period of nine months, dating back to 27 March, the day of his drug test. He was allowed to reapply after this time period in December 2012.

==== Return ====
Overeem returned to face Antônio Silva on 2 February 2013 at UFC 156. Leading up to the fight, Overeem was dismissive of Silva's skills, claiming he was better than his opponent in every aspect of MMA. Despite being a heavy betting favourite and having won rounds one and two, an overconfident Overeem lost to Silva by KO in the third round.

Overeem was expected to face former UFC Heavyweight Champion Junior dos Santos on 25 May 2013 at UFC 160. However, in early March, Overeem pulled out of the bout, citing an injury and was replaced by Mark Hunt.

For his third fight with the promotion, Overeem faced Travis Browne in the co-main event at UFC Fight Night 26 on 17 August 2013. Overeem was dominant early in the fight, attacking Browne with a flurry of knees and punches. Browne recovered and defeated Overeem via TKO with a front kick.

Overeem was scheduled to face Frank Mir on 16 November 2013 at UFC 167. However, the pairing was moved to 1 February 2014 at UFC 169. He defeated Mir by unanimous decision and called out Brock Lesnar in his post-fight interview.

Overeem injured his elbow and decided to take the time out to have surgery, expecting to return in September 2014. On 9 July, the UFC announced he would face Ben Rothwell on 5 September 2014 at UFC Fight Night 50. Rothwell defeated Overeem via TKO in the first round.

Overeem faced Stefan Struve at UFC on Fox 13 on 13 December 2014. He won the fight via KO in the first round.

Overeem next faced Roy Nelson on 14 March 2015 at UFC 185. He won the fight by unanimous decision.

A bout with Junior dos Santos was rescheduled for 19 December 2015 at UFC on Fox 17. He won the fight via TKO in the second round.

On 15 February 2016, Overeem announced that he had signed a new contract with the UFC.

Overeem faced Andrei Arlovski on 8 May 2016 at UFC Fight Night 87. He won the fight via TKO early in the second round. Subsequently, he earned his first Performance of the Night bonus.

Overeem faced Stipe Miocic for the UFC Heavyweight Championship on 10 September 2016 at UFC 203. Overeem dropped Miocic with a quick straight left punch before losing the fight via knockout in the first round. Both participants were awarded Fight of the Night honors.

Overeem faced Mark Hunt in a rematch on 4 March 2017 at UFC 209. He won the fight via knockout in the third round.

A third fight with Fabrício Werdum took place on 8 July 2017 at UFC 213. Overeem won the fight by majority decision.

Overeem faced Francis Ngannou on 2 December 2017 at UFC 218. He lost the fight via knockout in the first round.

Overeem faced Curtis Blaydes on 9 June 2018 at UFC 225. He lost the fight via TKO due to elbows in the third round.

Overeem faced promotional newcomer Sergei Pavlovich on 24 November 2018 at UFC Fight Night 141. He won the fight via TKO in the first round.

Overeem was expected to face Alexander Volkov on 20 April 2019 at UFC Fight Night 149. Volkov was forced to withdraw from the bout, and was replaced by Alexey Oleynik. After a few back-and-forth exchanges, Overeem won the fight via technical knockout in round one.

Overeem was expected to face Walt Harris on 7 December 2019 at UFC on ESPN 7. However, Harris pulled out on 1 November 2019 due to the ongoing search for his missing step-daughter, and he was replaced by Jairzinho Rozenstruik. He lost the fight via knockout in the last four seconds of the fifth round after being up on all three judges' scorecards (39–37, 39–37, and 40–36).

The bout with Walt Harris was rescheduled to take place on 11 April 2020 at UFC Fight Night: Overeem vs. Harris. Due to the COVID-19 pandemic, the event was eventually postponed. The fight was rescheduled to 16 May 2020 at UFC on ESPN: Overeem vs. Harris. Overeem was dropped and almost finished early in the first round, but went onto dominate the fight with ground and pound, eventually finishing Harris with a head kick and more ground and pound for a second-round TKO win.

Overeem faced Augusto Sakai on 5 September 2020 in the main event of UFC Fight Night 176. He won the fight via technical knockout in the fifth round.

Overeem faced Alexander Volkov on 6 February 2021 at UFC Fight Night 184. He lost the fight via technical knockout in round two.

On 3 March 2021, it was announced that Overeem had been released from his UFC contract.

== Kickboxing career ==
Overeem had his first professional kickboxing fight at the age of 17, in a K-1 rules fight on 15 November 1997, winning the fight. After that he fought against Paul Hordijk, winning by decision on 14 March 1999. Overeem then moved on to K-1, having two K-1 fights in six years against Errol Parris and Glaube Feitosa. Overeem was knocked out in both bouts and stayed with MMA from then on. He did not fight in K-1 for four more years.

On 31 December 2008, Overeem faced Badr Hari, one of K-1's top contenders, under K-1 rules at Dynamite!! 2008. He defeated Hari by way of knockout in the first round.

=== K-1 ===
On 28 March 2009 he faced Remy Bonjasky, the defending K-1 Champion, at the K-1 World GP 2009 in Yokohama. Overeem had success in the first and second rounds, but was knocked down by a right hook from Bonjasky in the third, who secured a unanimous decision win. All three judges scored the bout 30–28 in favour of Bonjasky.

On 26 September, at the K-1 World Grand Prix 2009 Final 16, having been selected by fan voting after his impressive performances against Remy Bonjasky and Badr Hari, Overeem shocked the kickboxing world by achieving a huge upset. He defeated K-1's longest-serving member, legendary three-time champion Peter Aerts, by unanimous decision. At the K-1 World Grand Prix 2009 Final, Overeem knocked out the Kyokushin karate champion, Ewerton Teixeira, with a knee strike in the first round, but lost to Badr Hari via TKO in the semifinals.

At the K-1 World Grand Prix 2010 in Yokohama, Overeem defeated Dzevad Poturak via KO (right knee) in round one at 2:40. Overeem defeated Ben Edwards by TKO in the first round on 2 October 2010 at K-1 World Grand Prix 2010 Final 16, which qualified him for the 2010 K-1 World Grand Prix.

On 11 December, at the Ariake Coliseum, Overeem won the K-1 World Grand Prix 2010 Final. In the quarterfinals, he beat Tyrone Spong by unanimous decision (29–27, 29–28, and 29–27). In the semi-finals, he defeated Gokhan Saki by first-round TKO after breaking Saki's right arm with a left middle kick. Saki's arm was already injured as a result of his previous fight with Daniel Ghita. In the finals, he fought Peter Aerts for a second time. Overeem came out aggressively and finished Aerts in the first round.

=== Glory ===
Over a decade removed from his previous kickboxing bouts, news surfaced on 8 June 2021, that Overeem had signed a multi-fight contract with Glory.

Overeem was scheduled to challenge the reigning Glory Heavyweight champion Rico Verhoeven at Glory: Collision 3 on 23 October 2021. On 6 October 2021 it was announced that Overeem had to withdraw from the event due to an injury. He was replaced by former Glory heavyweight title challenger Jamal Ben Saddik.

Overeem faced Badr Hari on 8 October 2022 at Glory: Collision 4. He won the fight via unanimous decision. On 21 November 2022, it was revealed that Overeem had tested positive for a banned substance. After a few months the B- Sample was also tested positive the decision was overturned to a No-Contest due to the use of Performance-enhancing Drugs.

== Professional boxing ==
Overeem is scheduled to make his boxing debut at Jake Paul’s MVP event against Jimi Manuwa on December 24, 2026 at the Coca-Cola Arena in Dubai.

== Professional wrestling career ==
=== Wrestling Entertainment Series ===
Overeem was scheduled to headline the first Wrestling Entertainment Series (WES) event in England against WWE wrestler Braun Strowman. After two prior cancellations and being rescheduled to take place on 9 July 2022, Wrestling Entertainment Series canceled its inaugural event.

== Political career ==
During the 2023 Dutch general election, Overeem participated for the last candidate on the party list of Belang van Nederland (BVNL). BVNL is a right-wing political party in the Netherlands, led by Wybren van Haga. The party was unable to win a seat.

== Fighting style ==
Overeem is considered one of the most well-rounded heavyweights in the sport, though he is mainly known for his excellence and power in the striking field. A kickboxer of the Dutch school of Muay Thai decorated in K-1 world tournaments, Overeem favours kicks to the body and legs and knee strikes from the clinch, which have been described as "devastating." His most famous finishing technique used to be the left knee to the midsection, which he has utilised to end many fights, but he switched to the left body kick instead late in his career. He is also proficient with left overhands and hooks once his opponents are worn down. On the grappling field, Overeem is universally known for his usage of the guillotine choke, a simple technique he uses to great effect thanks to his strength and height. Overeem was labeled as "the best grappler in Europe" after submitting all his opponents in the ADCC 2005 tryouts through this move.

== Personal life ==
Overeem's great-great-grandfather was enslaved on the island of Jamaica. He became a free man and bought a large tract of land on which he started a village, which has survived and prospered to this day. His Dutch mother is a descendant of King William III of the Netherlands through one of his many illegitimate children.

Overeem has a cameo appearance in the music video for LMFAO's hit single "Sexy and I Know It".

=== Legal issues ===
In 2009, Alistair and his brother were involved in an altercation at a Dutch dance club. Alistair started arguing with a bouncer when he found himself without coins to pay the toilet attendant and was asked to leave by five other security workers. Valentijn intervened in his favor and was hit in the face with a flash light, which incited a brawl. The incident ended with five bouncers having to go urgently to the hospital and Alistair being forced to turn down a title fight due to a hand injury gained in the brawl.

On 1 January 2012, following his match with Brock Lesnar at UFC 141, Overeem shoved a woman in the face, "causing her to stagger back," at the Wynn Las Vegas at about 3 a.m., according to the Las Vegas Police Department. Not arrested but summoned to court, Overeem was charged with misdemeanor battery and faced a maximum of six months in the Clark County Detention Center and a fine up to $1,000. On 28 March 2012, Overeem was given a 90-day county jail sentence that would be suspended depending on the completion of 50 hours of community service and anger management.

== Championships and accomplishments ==
=== Kickboxing ===
- K-1
  - K-1 2009 World Grand Prix (Third place)
  - K-1 2010 World Grand Prix (Champion)

=== Mixed martial arts ===
- Ultimate Fighting Championship
  - Heavyweight Title Challenger
  - Performance of the Night (One time) vs. Andrei Arlovski
  - Fight of the Night (One time) vs. Stipe Miocic
  - Tied (Cain Velasquez & Andrei Arlovski) for third most knockdowns landed in UFC Heavyweight division history (10)
  - Most knockout losses in Zuffa, LLC (UFC, Pride, WEC, Strikeforce) history (13)
  - UFC.com Awards
    - 2011: Ranked #10 Import of the Year (Tied with Danny Castillo)
- Strikeforce
  - Strikeforce Heavyweight Championship (One time; First; Last; Only)
  - One successful title defence
- PRIDE Fighting Championships
  - 2005 PRIDE Middleweight Grand Prix Semifinalist
- DREAM
  - DREAM Heavyweight Championship (One time; First; Last; Only)
- 2 Hot 2 Handle
  - 2H2H Light heavyweight Championship (One time)
  - 2H2H Light heavyweight Tournament Winner
- World MMA Awards
  - 2010 International Fighter of the Year
  - 2011 International Fighter of the Year
- Sherdog
  - 2010 All-Violence Second Team
  - 2015 All-Violence Third Team
- MMADNA.nl
  - 2018 Dutch Fighter of the Year.

=== Submission grappling ===
- ADCC Submission Wrestling World Championship
  - 2005 ADCC European Trials -98.9 kg Winner

=== Records ===
- Only fighter to simultaneously hold three championship belts (Strikeforce, K-1 and Dream)
- One of only two fighters to win a world championship in MMA and K-1

== Mixed martial arts record ==
Professional record breakdown
| 67 matches | 47 wins | 19 losses |
| By knockout | 25 | 15 |
| By submission | 17 | 1 |
| By decision | 5 | 3 |
| No contests | 1 | |

| Res. | Record | Opponent | Method | Event | Date | Round | Time | Location | Notes |
|---|---|---|---|---|---|---|---|---|---|
| Loss | 47–19 (1) | Alexander Volkov | TKO (punches) | UFC Fight Night: Overeem vs. Volkov | 6 February 2021 | 2 | 2:06 | Las Vegas, Nevada, United States | |
| Win | 47–18 (1) | Augusto Sakai | TKO (elbows and punches) | UFC Fight Night: Overeem vs. Sakai | 5 September 2020 | 5 | 0:26 | Las Vegas, Nevada, United States | |
| Win | 46–18 (1) | Walt Harris | TKO (punches) | UFC on ESPN: Overeem vs. Harris | 16 May 2020 | 2 | 3:00 | Jacksonville, Florida, United States | |
| Loss | 45–18 (1) | Jairzinho Rozenstruik | KO (punch) | UFC on ESPN: Overeem vs. Rozenstruik | 7 December 2019 | 5 | 4:56 | Washington, D.C., United States | |
| Win | 45–17 (1) | Aleksei Oleinik | TKO (punches) | UFC Fight Night: Overeem vs. Oleinik | 20 April 2019 | 1 | 4:45 | Saint Petersburg, Russia | |
| Win | 44–17 (1) | Sergei Pavlovich | TKO (punches) | UFC Fight Night: Blaydes vs. Ngannou 2 | 24 November 2018 | 1 | 4:21 | Beijing, China | |
| Loss | 43–17 (1) | Curtis Blaydes | TKO (elbows) | UFC 225 | 9 June 2018 | 3 | 2:56 | Chicago, Illinois, United States | |
| Loss | 43–16 (1) | Francis Ngannou | KO (punch) | UFC 218 | 2 December 2017 | 1 | 1:42 | Detroit, Michigan, United States | UFC Heavyweight title eliminator. |
| Win | 43–15 (1) | Fabrício Werdum | Decision (majority) | UFC 213 | 8 July 2017 | 3 | 5:00 | Las Vegas, Nevada, United States | |
| Win | 42–15 (1) | Mark Hunt | KO (knee) | UFC 209 | 4 March 2017 | 3 | 1:44 | Las Vegas, Nevada, United States | |
| Loss | 41–15 (1) | Stipe Miocic | KO (punches) | UFC 203 | 10 September 2016 | 1 | 4:27 | Cleveland, Ohio, United States | For the UFC Heavyweight Championship. Fight of the Night. |
| Win | 41–14 (1) | Andrei Arlovski | TKO (front kick and punches) | UFC Fight Night: Overeem vs. Arlovski | 8 May 2016 | 2 | 1:12 | Rotterdam, Netherlands | Performance of the Night. |
| Win | 40–14 (1) | Junior dos Santos | TKO (punches) | UFC on Fox: dos Anjos vs. Cowboy 2 | 19 December 2015 | 2 | 4:43 | Orlando, Florida, United States | |
| Win | 39–14 (1) | Roy Nelson | Decision (unanimous) | UFC 185 | 14 March 2015 | 3 | 5:00 | Dallas, Texas, United States | |
| Win | 38–14 (1) | Stefan Struve | KO (punches) | UFC on Fox: dos Santos vs. Miocic | 13 December 2014 | 1 | 4:13 | Phoenix, Arizona, United States | |
| Loss | 37–14 (1) | Ben Rothwell | TKO (punches) | UFC Fight Night: Jacaré vs. Mousasi | 5 September 2014 | 1 | 2:19 | Mashantucket, Connecticut, United States | |
| Win | 37–13 (1) | Frank Mir | Decision (unanimous) | UFC 169 | 1 February 2014 | 3 | 5:00 | Newark, New Jersey, United States | |
| Loss | 36–13 (1) | Travis Browne | KO (front kick and punches) | UFC Fight Night: Shogun vs. Sonnen | 17 August 2013 | 1 | 4:08 | Boston, Massachusetts, United States | |
| Loss | 36–12 (1) | Antônio Silva | KO (punches) | UFC 156 | 2 February 2013 | 3 | 0:25 | Las Vegas, Nevada, United States | |
| Win | 36–11 (1) | Brock Lesnar | TKO (kick to the body and punches) | UFC 141 | 30 December 2011 | 1 | 2:26 | Las Vegas, Nevada, United States | |
| Win | 35–11 (1) | Fabrício Werdum | Decision (unanimous) | Strikeforce: Overeem vs. Werdum | 18 June 2011 | 3 | 5:00 | Dallas, Texas, United States | Strikeforce Heavyweight Grand Prix Quarterfinal. Later withdrew due to disputes with the promoter. |
| Win | 34–11 (1) | Todd Duffee | KO (punches) | Dynamite!! 2010 | 31 December 2010 | 1 | 0:19 | Saitama, Japan | Won the inaugural DREAM Heavyweight Championship. |
| Win | 33–11 (1) | Brett Rogers | TKO (punches) | Strikeforce: Heavy Artillery | 15 May 2010 | 1 | 3:40 | St. Louis, Missouri, United States | Defended the Strikeforce Heavyweight Championship. |
| Win | 32–11 (1) | Kazuyuki Fujita | KO (knee) | Dynamite!! 2009 | 31 December 2009 | 1 | 1:15 | Saitama, Japan | |
| Win | 31–11 (1) | James Thompson | Submission (guillotine choke) | Dream 12 | 25 October 2009 | 1 | 0:33 | Osaka, Japan | |
| Win | 30–11 (1) | Tony Sylvester | Submission (guillotine choke) | Ultimate Glory 11 | 17 October 2009 | 1 | 1:23 | Amsterdam, Netherlands | |
| Win | 29–11 (1) | Gary Goodridge | Submission (keylock) | Ultimate Glory 10 | 9 November 2008 | 1 | 1:47 | Arnhem, Netherlands | |
| NC | 28–11 (1) | Mirko Cro Cop | NC (knee to the groin) | Dream 6 | 23 September 2008 | 1 | 6:09 | Saitama, Japan | Accidental knee to groin rendered Cro Cop unable to continue. |
| Win | 28–11 | Mark Hunt | Submission (keylock) | Dream 5 | 21 July 2008 | 1 | 1:11 | Osaka, Japan | |
| Win | 27–11 | Lee Tae-hyun | KO (punches) | Dream 4 | 15 June 2008 | 1 | 0:36 | Yokohama, Japan | |
| Win | 26–11 | Paul Buentello | TKO (submission to knees to the body) | Strikeforce: Four Men Enter, One Man Survives | 16 November 2007 | 2 | 3:42 | San Jose, California, United States | Won the inaugural Strikeforce Heavyweight Championship. |
| Loss | 25–11 | Sergei Kharitonov | KO (punch) | Hero's 10 | 17 September 2007 | 1 | 4:21 | Yokohama, Japan | |
| Win | 25–10 | Michael Knaap | Submission (Peruvian necktie) | K-1 World Grand Prix 2007 in Amsterdam | 23 June 2007 | 1 | 3:29 | Amsterdam, Netherlands | Return to Heavyweight. |
| Loss | 24–10 | Maurício Rua | KO (punches) | Pride 33 | 24 February 2007 | 1 | 3:37 | Las Vegas, Nevada, United States | |
| Loss | 24–9 | Ricardo Arona | TKO (submission to punches) | Pride Final Conflict Absolute | 10 September 2006 | 1 | 4:28 | Saitama, Japan | Return to Light Heavyweight; Overeem missed weight (208.9 lb). |
| Loss | 24–8 | Antônio Rogério Nogueira | TKO (corner stoppage) | Pride Critical Countdown Absolute | 1 July 2006 | 2 | 2:13 | Saitama, Japan | Catchweight (210 lb) bout. |
| Win | 24–7 | Vitor Belfort | Decision (unanimous) | Strikeforce: Revenge | 9 June 2006 | 3 | 5:00 | San Jose, California, United States | Catchweight (210 lb) bout. |
| Loss | 23–7 | Fabrício Werdum | Submission (kimura) | Pride Total Elimination Absolute | 5 May 2006 | 2 | 3:43 | Osaka, Japan | 2006 PRIDE Heavyweight Grand Prix Opening Round. |
| Win | 23–6 | Nikolajus Cilkinas | Submission (armbar) | World Cage FC: No Guts, No Glory | 18 March 2006 | 1 | 1:42 | Manchester, England | |
| Win | 22–6 | Sergei Kharitonov | TKO (knees) | Pride 31 | 26 February 2006 | 1 | 5:13 | Saitama, Japan | Return to Heavyweight. |
| Loss | 21–6 | Maurício Rua | TKO (punches) | Pride Final Conflict 2005 | 28 August 2005 | 1 | 6:42 | Saitama, Japan | 2005 PRIDE Middleweight Grand Prix Semifinal. |
| Win | 21–5 | Igor Vovchanchyn | Submission (guillotine choke) | Pride Critical Countdown 2005 | 26 June 2005 | 1 | 1:20 | Saitama, Japan | 2005 PRIDE Middleweight Grand Prix Quarterfinal. |
| Win | 20–5 | Vitor Belfort | Submission (guillotine choke) | Pride Total Elimination 2005 | 23 April 2005 | 1 | 9:36 | Osaka, Japan | 2005 PRIDE Middleweight Grand Prix Opening Round. |
| Loss | 19–5 | Antônio Rogério Nogueira | Decision (unanimous) | Pride 29 | 20 February 2005 | 3 | 5:00 | Saitama, Japan | Return to Light Heavyweight. |
| Win | 19–4 | Hiromitsu Kanehara | TKO (doctor stoppage) | Pride 28 | 31 October 2004 | 2 | 3:52 | Saitama, Japan | |
| Win | 18–4 | Rodney Glunder | Submission (guillotine choke) | 2 Hot 2 Handle: Simply The Best 8 | 10 October 2004 | 1 | N/A | Rotterdam, Netherlands | Won the 2H2H Light heavyweight Championship. |
| Win | 17–4 | Tomohiko Hashimoto | TKO (knees) | Inoki Bom-Ba-Ye 2003 | 31 December 2003 | 1 | 0:36 | Kobe, Japan | Return to Heavyweight. |
| Loss | 16–4 | Chuck Liddell | KO (punches) | Pride Total Elimination 2003 | 10 August 2003 | 1 | 3:09 | Saitama, Japan | 2003 PRIDE Middleweight Grand Prix Quarterfinal. |
| Win | 16–3 | Mike Bencic | TKO (knee to the body and punches) | Pride 26 | 8 June 2003 | 1 | 3:44 | Yokohama, Japan | Light Heavyweight debut. |
| Win | 15–3 | Aaron Brink | Submission (guillotine choke) | 2 Hot 2 Handle: Simply the Best 6 | 16 March 2003 | 1 | 0:53 | Rotterdam, Netherlands | |
| Win | 14–3 | Bazigit Atajev | TKO (knee to the body) | Pride 24 | 23 December 2002 | 2 | 4:59 | Fukuoka, Japan | |
| Win | 13–3 | Dave Vader | TKO (doctor stoppage) | 2 Hot 2 Handle: Simply the Best 5 | 13 October 2002 | 2 | N/A | Rotterdam, Netherlands | Won the 2H2H Light heavyweight Tournament. |
| Win | 12–3 | Moise Rimbon | Submission (guillotine choke) | 2 Hot 2 Handle: Simply the Best 5 | 13 October 2002 | 1 | 1:03 | Rotterdam, Netherlands | 2H2H Light heavyweight Tournament Semifinal. |
| Win | 11–3 | Yusuke Imamura | TKO (knee and punches) | Pride The Best Vol.2 | 20 July 2002 | 1 | 0:44 | Tokyo, Japan | |
| Win | 10–3 | Vesa Vuori | TKO (punches) | 2 Hot 2 Handle: Germany | 26 May 2002 | 1 | 2:15 | Krefeld, Germany | |
| Win | 9–3 | Sergey Kaznovsky | Submission (armbar) | M-1: Russia vs. the World 3 | 26 April 2002 | 1 | 3:37 | Saint Petersburg, Russia | |
| Win | 8–3 | Roman Zentsov | Submission (keylock) | 2 Hot 2 Handle: Simply the Best 4 | 17 March 2002 | 1 | 1:26 | Rotterdam, Netherlands | |
| Win | 7–3 | Stanislav Nuschik | TKO (knees) | 2 Hot 2 Handle: Simply The Best 2 | 18 March 2001 | 1 | 0:53 | Rotterdam, Netherlands | |
| Win | 6–3 | Vladimer Chanturia | Submission (rear-naked choke) | Rings Japan: King of Kings 2000 Final | 24 February 2001 | 1 | 1:06 | Tokyo, Japan | |
| Win | 5–3 | Peter Verschuren | Submission (keylock) | It's Showtime: Christmas Edition | 12 December 2000 | 1 | 1:06 | Haarlem, Netherlands | |
| Loss | 4–3 | Bobby Hoffman | KO (Lariat) | Rings Japan: Millennium Combine 2 | 15 June 2000 | 1 | 9:39 | Tokyo, Japan | |
| Loss | 4–2 | Yuriy Kochkine | Decision (split) | Rings Russia: Russia vs. The World 2 | 20 May 2000 | 2 | 5:00 | Yekaterinburg, Russia | |
| Win | 4–1 | Yasuhito Namekawa | Submission (armbar) | Rings Japan: Millennium Combine 1 | 20 April 2000 | 1 | 0:45 | Tokyo, Japan | |
| Win | 3–1 | Can Sahinbas | KO (knee) | 2 Hot 2 Handle: Simply The Best 1 | 5 March 2000 | 1 | 2:21 | Rotterdam, Netherlands | |
| Win | 2–1 | Chris Watts | KO (knee to the body) | Rings Holland: There Can Only Be One Champion | 6 February 2000 | 1 | 3:58 | Utrecht, Netherlands | |
| Loss | 1–1 | Yuriy Kochkine | Decision (majority) | Rings Japan: King of Kings 1999 Block A | 28 October 1999 | 2 | 5:00 | Tokyo, Japan | |
| Win | 1–0 | Ricardo Fyeet | Submission (guillotine choke) | It's Showtime 2 | 24 October 1999 | 1 | 1:39 | Haarlem, Netherlands | Heavyweight debut. |

== Pay-per-view bouts ==
| No. | Event | Fight | Date | Venue | City | PPV Buys |
|---|---|---|---|---|---|---|
| 1. | UFC 141 | Lesnar vs. Overeem | 30 December 2011 | MGM Grand Garden Arena | Las Vegas, Nevada, United States | 750,000 |
| 2. | UFC 203 | Miocic vs. Overeem | 10 September 2016 | Quicken Loans Arena | Cleveland, Ohio, United States | 475,000 |

== Kickboxing record ==
Kickboxing record
10 Wins (7 (T)KO's, 3 Decisions), 4 Losses (3 (T)KO's, 1 Decision), 1 No contest
| Date | Result | Opponent | Event | Location | Method | Round | Time | Record |
| 2022-10-08 | NC | (Morocco) Badr Hari | Glory: Collision 4 | Arnhem, Netherlands | No contest | 3 | 3:00 | 10–4–(1) |
Originally a decision win for Overeem. Later changed to a No contest after he tested positive for performance-enhancing drugs.
| 2010-12-11 | Win | (Netherlands) Peter Aerts | K-1 World Grand Prix 2010 Final, Final | Tokyo, Japan | TKO (punches) | 1 | 1:07 | 10–4 |
Wins the K-1 2010 World Grand Prix Championship.
| 2010-12-11 | Win | (Turkey) Gökhan Saki | K-1 World Grand Prix 2010 Final, semi-finals | Tokyo, Japan | TKO (arm injury) | 1 | 2:20 | 9–4 |
| 2010-12-11 | Win | (Suriname) Tyrone Spong | K-1 World Grand Prix 2010 Final, quarter-finals | Tokyo, Japan | Decision (unanimous) | 3 | 3:00 | 8–4 |
| 2010-10-02 | Win | (Australia) Ben Edwards | K-1 World Grand Prix 2010 in Seoul Final 16 | Seoul, South Korea | KO (right hook) | 1 | 2:08 | 7–4 |
Qualifies for K-1 2010 World Grand Prix.
| 2010-04-03 | Win | (Bosnia and Herzegovina) Dževad Poturak | K-1 World Grand Prix 2010 in Yokohama | Yokohama, Japan | KO (right knee) | 1 | 2:40 | 6–4 |
| 2009-12-05 | Loss | (Morocco) Badr Hari | K-1 World Grand Prix 2009 Final, semi-finals | Yokohama, Japan | TKO (2 knockdowns rule) | 1 | 2:14 | 5–4 |
| 2009-12-05 | Win | (Brazil) Ewerton Teixeira | K-1 World Grand Prix 2009 Final, quarter-finals | Yokohama, Japan | KO (knees) | 1 | 1:06 | 5–3 |
| 2009-09-26 | Win | (Netherlands) Peter Aerts | K-1 World Grand Prix 2009 Final 16 | Seoul, South Korea | Decision (unanimous) | 3 | 3:00 | 4–3 |
Qualifies for K-1 2009 World Grand Prix.
| 2009-03-28 | Loss | (Netherlands) Remy Bonjasky | K-1 World GP 2009 in Yokohama | Yokohama, Japan | Decision (unanimous) | 3 | 3:00 | 3–3 |
| 2008-12-31 | Win | (Morocco) Badr Hari | Dynamite!! 2008 | Saitama, Japan | TKO (left hook) | 1 | 2:07 | 3–2 |
| 2007-05-20 | Win | (Germany) Jürgen Dolch | Ultimate Glory 3: Upside Down | Amersfoort, Netherlands | KO (punch) | 1 | 2:02 | 2–2 |
| 2004-05-30 | Loss | (Brazil) Glaube Feitosa | Kyokushin vs K-1 2004 All Out Battle | Tokyo, Japan | KO (punch) | 1 | 2:13 | 1–2 |
| 2001-02-04 | Loss | (Netherlands) Errol Parris | K-1 Holland GP 2001 in Arnhem | Arnhem, Netherlands | TKO (corner stoppage) | 3 | 1:22 | 1–1 |
| 1999-03-14 | Win | (Netherlands) Paul Hordijk | Thaiboxing Event in Veenendaal | Veenendaal, Netherlands | Decision (unanimous) | 3 | 2:00 | 1–0 |
Legend: Win Loss Draw/No contest Notes

== Electoral history ==
Electoral history of Alistair Overeem
| Year | Body | Party | Pos. | Votes | Result | | Ref. |
| Year | Body | Party | Pos. | Votes | Party seats | Individual | Ref. |
|---|---|---|---|---|---|---|---|
| 2023 | House of Representatives | Belang van Nederland | 41 (Note: Overeem participated as a lijstduwer.) | 852 | 0 | Lost | |

== See also ==
- List of male mixed martial artists
- List of male kickboxers
- List of multi-sport athletes

== Notes ==
Awards and achievements
| Preceded by Semmy Schilt | K-1 World Grand Prix Champion; December 11, 2010 | Succeeded by Ariel Machado |
| New championship | 1st Strikeforce Heavyweight Champion; 16 November 2007 – 29 July 2011; Vacated | Contract absorbed by the UFC |
| New title | 1st DREAM Heavyweight Champion; 31 December 2010 – 6 September 2011 | Overeem signed with UFC |
