= List of professional MMA training camps =

This is a list of notable present professional training camps and gyms in mixed martial arts (MMA).

Most professional MMA fighters in the UFC, Bellator and other MMA promotions join a professional fight camp or training gym to help them prepare for fights. Training at a top camp can be a big advantage to fighters, as not only do they have access to multi-disciplinary coaching, but they can also train against the other top fighters at the camp and nominate members of the camp as corner men. By training a group of elite fighters together, they will all learn from each other's skill sets and can support each other living the disciplined fighter lifestyle. Before a fight, a fighter will undergo an intensive training regime of several weeks, often culminating in a dramatic weight cut to make the required fighting weight, and the other members in the fighting camp are an important part of this process.

MMA training camps can change names as their personnel and sponsorships change. The Blackzilians split in 2017; coaches Henri Hooft and Greg Jones subsequently formed Combat Club, which later operated as Hard Knocks 365 and Sanford MMA before becoming Kill Cliff FC in 2022.

== List of MMA camps ==
Camp (in alphabetic order)	Coaches	Current fighters (UFC title holders in bold)	Previous fighters	Location
**Adrenaline MMA Training & Fitness**	Shawn Tompkins (Founder); Mark Hominick; Sam Stout; Chris Horodecki	Jesse Ronson; Malcolm Gordon	Mark Hominick; Sam Stout; Chris Horodecki; Chad Laprise; Chris Clements	London, Ontario, Canada
**Alliance MMA Gym**	Brandon Vera; Eric del Fierro	Dominick Cruz; Phil Davis; Ross Pearson; Jeremy Stephens; Myles Jury; Wilson Reis; Erik Pérez; Jessica Penne; Bec Rawlings; Angela Hill	Alexander Gustafsson	San Diego, California, United States
**Allstars Training Center**	Andreas Michael; Alan do Nascimento	Alexander Gustafsson; Ilir Latifi; David Teymur; Daniel Teymur; David Bielkheden; Niklas Bäckström; Makwan Amirkhani; Nico Musoke	Khamzat Chimaev; Reza Madadi; Jimi Manuwa; Tor Troéng	Stockholm, Sweden
**AMC Pankration**	Matt Hume	Bibiano Fernandes Caros Fodor	Josh Barnett Rich Franklin Jeff Monson Tim Boetsch Chris Leben Matt Brown Hayato Sakurai Demetrious Johnson	Kirkland, Washington, United States
**American Kickboxing Academy**	Javier Mendez; Bob Cook; Leandro Vieira	**Islam Makhachev**; Alejandro Pérez; Umar Nurmagomedov; Usman Nurmagomedov; Arjan Bhullar; Deron Winn Tagir Ulanbekov; Gabriel Benítez; Islam Mamedov; Zubaira Tukhugov	B.J. Penn; Bethe Correia; Cain Velasquez; Daniel Cormier; Jon Fitch; Josh Koscheck; Khabib Nurmagomedov; Luke Rockhold; Leon Edwards; Mike Swick	San Jose, California, United States
**American Top Team**	Mike Brown; Steve Mocco; Marcus Silveira; Adriano Moraes; John Lineker	Junior Dos Santos; Thiago Alves; Gleison Tibau; Antônio "Bigfoot" Silva; Brad Pickett; Muhammed "King Mo" Lawal; Will Brooks; Marc Diakiese; Dustin Poirier; Charles Rosa; Yoel Romero; Santiago Ponzinibbio; Thiago Santos; Antônio Carlos Júnior; Marcos Rogério de Lima; Oleksiy Oliynyk; Rashid Magomedov; Douglas Lima; Dhiego Lima; Omari Akhmedov; Sultan Aliev; Alex Chambers; Jessica Aguilar; Valérie Létourneau; Jairzinho Rozenstruik Movsar Evloev Greg Hardy Sergei Pavlovich	Tyron Woodley Colby Covington Jorge Masvidal Joanna Jędrzejczyk Amanda Nunes	Coconut Creek, Florida, United States
**Bangtao Muay Thai & MMA**	George Hickman Frank Hickman Alex Schild Andrew Wood Master Yod	**Alexander Volkanovski** Jiří Procházka Zhang Weili Loma Lookboonmee Shannon Wiratchai		Phuket, Thailand
**Brazilian Top Team**	Murilo Bustamante		Ricardo Arona; Vitor Belfort; Anderson Silva; Allan Goes; Paulo Filho; Antônio Rodrigo Nogueira; Antônio Rogério Nogueira; Rousimar Palhares; Antônio Silva; Mário Sperry	Rio de Janeiro, Brazil
**Bonebreakers MMA**	Augusto Montaño	David Martínez; Erick Montaño	Daniel Salas	Mexico City, Mexico
**Busan Team M.A.D**	Sung Hoon Yang	Seo Hee Ham; Doo Ho Choi	Dong Hyun Kim	Busan, South Korea
**Cesar Gracie Fight Team**	Cesar Gracie	Nick Diaz Nate Diaz Jake Shields Gilbert Melendez Yancy Medeiros	David Terrell	Pleasant Hill, California, United States
**China Top Team**	Zhang Tiequan Vincent Soberano	Yan Xiaonan Li Jingliang Shayilan Nuerdanbieke	Zhang Weili Yao Zhikui	Beijing, China
**Chute Boxe Academy**	Rudimar Fedrigo Mestre Zito Gerson Schilipacke Jose Landi-Jons	Charles Oliveira Cris Cyborg	Wanderlei Silva; Mauricio Rua; Murilo Rua; Anderson Silva; Gabriel Gonzaga; Assuério Silva; Thiago Silva; Kazushi Sakuraba; Andre Dida; Cristiano Marcello; Luiz Azeredo; Rafael Cordeiro	Curitiba, Paraná, Brazil
**City Kickboxing**	Eugene Bareman	Israel Adesanya; **Alexander Volkanovski**; Dan Hooker; Kai Kara-France; Shane Young; Carlos Ulberg; Brad Riddell		Auckland, New Zealand
**Elevation Fight Team**	Eliot Marshall Christian Allen Cody Donovan Vinnie Lopez David Zabriskie Sean Madden	Curtis Blaydes Drew Dober Bojan Velickovic Neil Magny Daniel Gallemore Justin Gaethje JJ Aldrich Miranda Maverick	Brandon Thatch T. J. Dillashaw Alistair Overeem Matt Brown	Denver, Colorado
**Enbo Fight Club**	En Bo		Song Yadong Su Mudaerji Liu Pingyuan Rong Zhu	Chengdu, Sichuan, China
**Entram Gym**	Raúl Arvizu	Yazmin Jauregui; Michael Morales; José Alberto Quiñónez; Silvana Gómez Juárez; Édgar Cháirez; Santiago Luna	Brandon Moreno; Akbarh Arreola; Martin Bravo; Polo Reyes; Karina Rodríguez	Tijuana, Baja California, Mexico
**Evolve MMA**	Eddie Ng	Shinya Aoki; Xiong Jing Nan; Fabrício Andrade; Demetrius Johnson; Angela Lee; Bruno Pucci; Christian Lee; Rafael dos Anjos	Dejdamrong Sor Amnuaysirichoke; Michelle Nicolini; Victoria Lee	Singapore
**Factory X**	Marc Montoya	Anthony Smith Court McGee; Youssef Zalal; Brandon Royval		Englewood, Colorado
**Fortis MMA**	Sayif Saud	Brandon Moreno		Dallas, Texas, United States
**FedorTeam** (affiliate of Alexander Nevsky OEMK)	Fedor Emelianenko	Fedor Emelianenko Vadim Nemkov Valentin Moldavsky Viktor Nemkov Anatoly Tokov		Stary Oskol, Russia
**Fight Ready**	Angel Cejudo Eddie Cha Eric Albarracin Frankie Saenz Paris Stanford	Deiveson Figueiredo; **Jon Jones**; Chan Sung Jung; Paulo Costa; Jiří Procházka; Amir Albazi; Patrício Pitbull; Mark Madsen	Henry Cejudo Zhang Weili	Scottsdale, Arizona, United States
**Jackson Wink MMA Academy**	Greg Jackson; Mike Winkeljohn	John Dodson; Diego Brandão; Holly Holm; Michelle Waterson; Ray Borg; Lando Vannata; Ali Bagautinov; Magomed Mustafaev; Kyle Noke; Tom Duquesnoy; Iuri Alcântara; Ildemar Alcântara; Siyar Bahadurzada	Jon Jones; Georges St-Pierre; Rashad Evans; Tim Kennedy; Donald Cerrone; Derek Brunson; Carlos Condit	Albuquerque, New Mexico, United States
**Kill Cliff FC** (formerly Combat Club, Hard Knocks 365, and Sanford MMA)	Henri Hooft Greg Jones Corey Peacock Kami Barzini	Kamaru Usman; Michael Johnson; Stefan Struve; Ryan LaFlare; Matt Mitrione; Chas Skelly; Desmond Green; Danny Roberts; Derek Brunson; Gilbert Burns; Vicente Luque; Volkan Oezdemir; Aung La N Sang; Martin Nguyen; Luke Rockhold; Andre Soukhamthath; Michael Chandler; Li Jingliang; Shavkat Rakhmonov; Sayran Nurdanbek	Eddie Alvarez; Anthony Johnson; Alistair Overeem; Sean Soriano	Deerfield Beach, Florida, United States
**Kings MMA**	Rafael Cordeiro; Mark Muñoz	Fabrício Werdum; Lyoto Machida; Kelvin Gastelum; Beneil Dariush; Jon Tuck; Marvin Vettori; Giga Chikadze	Rafael dos Anjos; Wanderlei Silva; Maurício "Shogun" Rua; Jake Ellenberger	Huntington Beach, California, United States
**Predator MMA Indonesia**	Linson Simanjuntak	Sunoto; The Terminator	Sunoto	Solo, Indonesia
**Korean Top Team**	Ha Dong-Jin	Tae Hyun Bang; Yang Dongi; Kim Jong-Man; Lim Hyun-Gyu		Seoul, South Korea
**Krazy Bee**	Sergio Cunha	Kyoji Horiguchi; Kotetsu Boku	Norifumi Yamamoto	Tokyo, Japan
**Lobo Gym MMA**	Francisco Grasso	Diego Lopes; Alexa Grasso; Irene Aldana; Loopy Godínez	Álvaro Herrera; Karina Rodríguez; Alejandra Lara	Guadalajara, Jalisco, Mexico
**Long Island MMA**	Gregg DePasquale Ryan LaFlare; Dennis Bermudez; Chris Wade; Brian Michelino; Anthony D’Angelo; Kevin Coyne; Robert Labiento; Ryan Patrovich; Brent Appiarius; Kyle Cerminara	Brian Kelleher Adam Livingston	Ryan LaFlare Dennis Bermudez; Chris Wade	Long Island, New York, United States
**London Shootfighters**	Alexis Demetriades; Marios Demetriades; Paul Ivens	Michael Page; John Hathaway; Zelg Galešić; Karlos Vémola; Alphie Davis; Mike Shipman; Norbert Növényi Jr.	Lee Murray; Marius Zaromskis; James Thompson; Mostapha al-Turk; Alex Reid	London, England, United Kingdom
**Nova União**	Andre Pederneiras	Renan Barão; Thales Leites; Hacran Dias; Johnny Eduardo; Jussier Formiga; Francimar Barroso; Ketlen Vieira; Alexandre Pantoja; Junior dos Santos; Poliana Botelho	José Aldo Cláudia Gadelha Leonardo Santos	Rio de Janeiro, Brazil
**Minnesota Martial Arts Academy**	Greg Nelson Andy Grahn; Nat McIntyre	John Castaneda Troy Jones; Quang Le; Mike Richman	Pat Barry Cole Konrad; Brock Larson; Brock Lesnar; Nik Lentz; Dave Menne; Rose Namajunas; Sean Sherk; Nick Thompson; Jacob Volkmann	Minneapolis, MN
**MMA Factory**	Fernand Lopez	Ciryl Gane; Christian M'Pumbu; Veronica Macedo; Ion Cuțelaba; Nassourdine Imavov; Taylor Lapilus; Rizlen Zouak	Francis Ngannou	Paris, France
**MMA Lab**	John Crouch; Adam Gillespey	Benson Henderson; Efraín Escudero; Jared Cannonier; John Moraga; Johnny Case; **Sean O'Malley**; Steven Siler	Alex Caceres; Bryan Barberena; Jamie Varner; Rick Story	Glendale, Arizona, United States
**Onx Sports**	Trevor Wittman	Kamaru Usman; Rose Namajunas; Justin Gaethje**Justin Gaethje**		Denver, Colorado, United States
**Phuket Top Team**	Olavo Abreu; Vaughan Lee; Leo De Souza; Roedie Roets	Vaughan Lee	Xiong Jingnan; Cris Cyborg; Luke Jumeau; Anthony Leone; Krzysztof Jotko	Phuket, Thailand
**Roufusport**	Duke Roufus; Daniel Wanderley; Scott Cushman	Anthony Pettis; Belal Muhammad; Erik Koch; Sergio Pettis; Emmanuel Sanchez; Gerald Meerschaert; Mike Rhodes; Sarah Kaufman; Ryan Janes; John Makdessi; Jared Gordon; Jordan Griffin; Tyron Woodley; Maycee Barber; Brendan Allen	Ben Askren; Dustin Ortiz; Ben Rothwell; Alan Belcher; Pat Barry; Matt Mitrione; Paul Felder; Jens Pulver; Pascal Krauss; Rose Namajunas; Sage Northcutt; CM Punk	Milwaukee, Wisconsin, United States
**RVCA Training Center**	Jason Parillo	Vitor Belfort; Marlon Vera; Luke Rockhold; Mackenzie Dern	B.J. Penn; Cris Cyborg; Michael Bisping; Rafael Dos Anjos; Tito Ortiz	Costa Mesa, California, United States
**SBG Ireland**	John Kavanagh	Makwan Amirkhani; Taylor Lapilus; Artem Lobov; Conor McGregor; Gunnar Nelson; John Phillips Johnny Walker	Aisling Daly; Patrick Holohan; Cathal Pendred	Dublin, Ireland
**Serra-Longo Fight Team**	Matt Serra; Ray Longo	Matt Serra; Chris Weidman; **Aljamain Sterling**; Eddie Gordon; Merab Dvalishvili; Mizuki Inoue; Matt Frevola	Al Iaquinta; Gian Villante	Long Island, New York, United States
**Syndicate**	Frank Hickman (head coach); John Wood	Frank Mir; Sasha Palatnikov; Joanne Calderwood; Donald Cerrone; Daniel Rodriguez; Roxanne Modafferi Ode' Osbourne		Las Vegas, Nevada, United States
**Team Alpha Male**	Urijah Faber; Martin Kampmann	Clay Guida; Joseph Benavidez; Darren Elkins; Andre Fili; Cody Garbrandt; Guido Cannetti; Teruto Ishihara; Cynthia Calvillo; Josh Emmett; Song Yadong; Yan Xiaonan	Chad Mendes; T.J. Dillashaw; Paige VanZant	Sacramento, California, United States
**Team Bodyshop MMA**	Antonio McKee	A.J. McKee; Joey Davis	Quinton "Rampage" Jackson Chuck Liddell	Lakewood, California, United States
**Team Lloyd Irvin**	Lloyd Irvin	Mike Easton; James Vick; Sodiq Yusuff; Ron Stallings	Brandon Vera; Phil Davis; Dominick Cruz	Camp Springs, Maryland, United States
**Team Renegade**	Chiu Kwong Man; Dave Lovell; Mojtaba Aslani	Leon Edwards; Tom Breese; Fabian Edwards; Jai Herbert		Birmingham, England, United Kingdom
**Teixeira MMA & Fitness**	Glover Teixeira; Caio Magalhaes; Regivaldo Carvalho	**Glover Teixeira**; **Aline Pereira**; **Alex Pereira**; **Sean Strickland**; Caio Magalhaes; Yousri Belgaroui; Nick Newell; Dominick Reyes; Guilherme Viana; Wellington Turman; Lyoto Machida; Laureano Staropoli; Gregory Rodrigues; Sabina Mazo; César Almeida (fighter)	André Muniz; Emiliano Sordi; Dean Lister; Steve Mocco; Chael Sonnen; Muhammed "King Mo" Lawal; Polyana Viana; Dan Cramer; Philip Rowe; Jordan Rinaldi; Luis Henrique	Bethel, Connecticut, United States
**Tiger Muay Thai**	George Hickman	Valentina Shevchenko; Petr Yan; Vitaly Bigdash; Fabricio Andrade; Anatoly Malykhin; Tarec Saffiedine; Mairbek Taisumov; Loma Lookboonmee; Zubaira Tukhugov; Nordine Taleb; Nick Hein; Ben Nguyen; Dan Hooker; Jason Saggo; Arman Tsarukyan; Khamzat Chimaev		Phuket, Thailand
**Tribe Tokyo MMA**	Ryo Chonan	Yasuhiro Urushitani; Yuya Shirai; Kiyotaka Shimizu		Nerima, Tokyo, Japan
**Tristar Gym**	Firas Zahabi	Aiemann Zahabi; Olivier Aubin-Mercier; Chad Laprise; Ryan Hall; Arnold Allen; Joanne Calderwood; Nasrat Haqparast	Georges St-Pierre; Rory MacDonald; Kenny Florian; Joseph Duffy; Tom Breese; Elias Theodorou	Montreal, Quebec, Canada
**Xtreme Couture**	Randy Couture; Eric Nicksick	Francis Ngannou; Roy Nelson; Evan Dunham; Brad Tavares; Bryan Caraway; Uriah Hall; Daniel Zellhuber; Gray Maynard; Kevin Lee; Tim Elliott; Frank Trigg; Heather Jo Clark; Misha Cirkunov; Miesha Tate; Dan Ige; Sean Strickland; Chris Curtis	Gina Carano	Las Vegas, Nevada, United States
