= En Bo =

Chinese MMA Coach (born 1962)

- Born: En Bo; 1962 (age 63–64); Heishui, Aba Prefecture, Sichuan, China
- Native name: 恩波
- Style: Sanda

Other information
- Occupation: Founder of Enbo Fight Club

En Bo (Chinese: 恩波; pinyin: Ēn Bō; born 1962) is a Chinese Mixed martial arts (MMA) and Sanda coach and former Sanda practitioner. He is the founder of Chinese MMA club, Enbo Fight Club.

== Early life ==
En Bo was born in 1962 in Heishui County, Aba Prefecture in Sichuan Province. He is of Tibetan ethnicity. En came from a poor background. When he was eight, his father died.

When En was eighteen, he joined the People's Armed Police and started practicing Sanda. In 1980, En won two championships in parallel bars and grappling at a competition hosted by the Aba Prefecture Armed Police. En has stated he regrets he didn't pick up fighting earlier as it was too late for him to be joining professional competitions.

== Career ==
En has stated that during his time in the armed police, he encountered orphaned children wandering in the mountains or on the streets. In 1997, En retired from the armed police to work in construction engineering to raise funds for launching a club that could help orphans and prevent them from turning to crime.

In 2001, En founded the Aba Prefecture Sanda Club (which would later be renamed to Enbo Fight Club). It gradually became known as a martial arts club for children from rural and underdeveloped areas. In 2015, the school transitioned to become a MMA club and started hiring MMA coaches. En told West China City Daily that the children were sent to the club by relatives to acquire skills. Children at the school call En "Godfather" and said he treats them well.

In 2017, a video surfaced of two 12-14-year-old boys competing in a commercial MMA bout which gained 12 million views and caused outrage in China. Shortly after the video surfaced, the police in China opened an investigation into the Enbo Fight Club. En stated that the club did not do anything illegal and that no children were forced to do such things. He also said the club went through proper procedures when recruiting children to join it.

== Media portrayal ==
The 2023 film, Never Say Never is a fictional portrayal of En and the Enbo Fight Club. En is portrayed by Wang Baoqiang as Xiang Tenghu, a former fighter who starts a fight club for orphans. Wang spent six years working on the film. En as well as his students from the club were at the film's premiere.

Earlier on in March 2023, En Bo suffered a heart attack and was hospitalized. He was in a coma for many days and had lost 57 pounds. Wang not only helped contact experts to help but also paid for the medical expenses. Wang stated he and En Bo had many similarities such as coming from poor backgrounds and refusing to give up despite difficult circumstances.

== Students ==
- Song Yadong (UFC fighter, peak ranking 7th in Bantamweight division)
- Su Mudaerji (UFC fighter, peak ranking 11th in Flyweight Division)
- Liu Pingyuan (UFC fighter)
- Rong Zhu (UFC fighter, Road to UFC Season 2 Lightweight tournament winner)
- Maheshate (UFC fighter, first fighter from China to win a UFC contract on Dana White's Contender Series)
- Yi Zha (UFC fighter, Road to UFC Season 2 Featherweight tournament winner)

== See also ==
- Enbo Fight Club
- Never Say Never (2023 film)
