= WXC =

WXC, or wxc, may refer to:

- The Warrior Xtreme Cagefighting
- The IAAF World Cross Country Championships
- WXC, the National Rail code for Wrexham Central railway station in Wales, UK

See also
