= Training camp =

Facility for training military or sports skills

A training camp is an organized period in which military personnel or athletes participate in a rigorous and focused schedule of training in order to learn or improve skills. Athletes typically utilise training camps to prepare for upcoming events, and in competitive sports, to focus on developing skills and strategies to defeat their opponents. A military training camp generally refers to the period of boot camp, or further or refresher training.

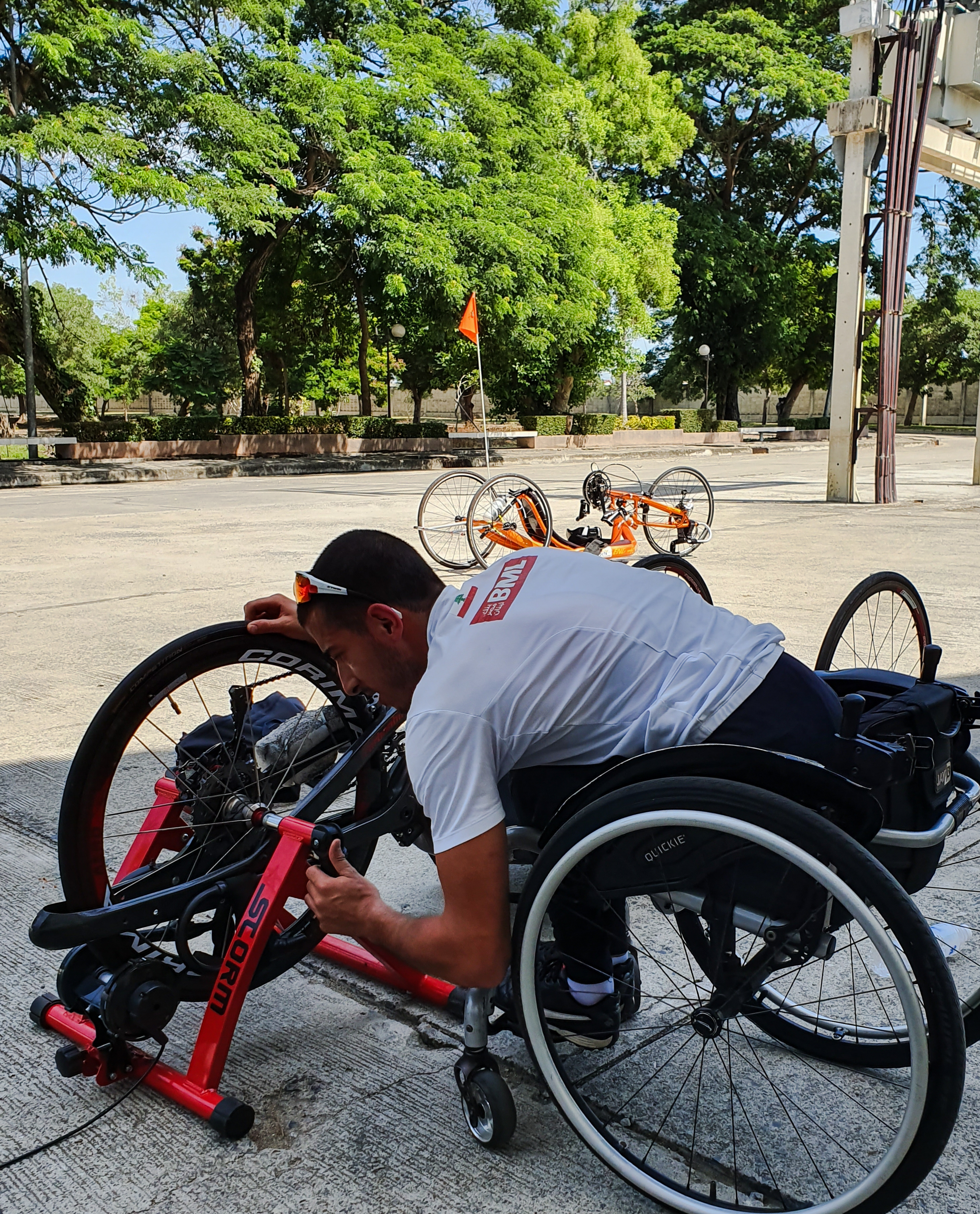
Hassan Dia sets up his handcycle trainer during a para-cycling training camp in Thailand.

== Mixed martial arts ==
In mixed martial arts (MMA), a training camp (also often referred to as a fight camp or just camp) is the period prior to an organised bout in which a fighter trains specifically for the upcoming event. Fighters will usually train at a martial arts gym, where they may have other fighters and coaches able to assist them with various forms of training, including in different styles of martial arts. If they have one, a fighter would generally work with their regular coach. Some fighters, especially in professional MMA, bring in additional specialised coaches to help with the training process.

=== Structure ===
Professional MMA training camps typically commence 4 to 10 weeks prior to an event. For more significant fights or other major events, such as championship or title fights, a training camp may be up to 16 weeks.

In amateur MMA, or even rarely in professional MMA, events may take place at short notice, either intentionally or due to fighters withdrawing from planned bouts. In these instances, fighters will only have a period of several days in which to conduct their training camps. In such cases fighters rely on their general training for the bout, and typically spend the training camp on ensuring they achieve the required weight for the bout. Fighters will typically commence their training camps at their regular gyms with their coaches and trainers, but some may visit different gyms throughout the training camp in order to train with athletes fighting with different martial arts and styles.

MMA training camps generally use an undulating training cycle, which helps a fighter balance all required elements of their training into shorter intensive cycles. Developing an effective and comprehensive training regimen can be difficult due to the amount of training elements required for an MMA fighter. A training camp weekly cycle may include several martial arts sessions, cardiovascular and endurance training, speed and power training, as well as strength training.

The structure of the training in a camp can be dependant on the length of the bout in question. In general fights consisting of three 5 minute rounds, less endurance training is required during the training camp. In training for title fights or other extended bouts, which generally feature increased and lengthened rounds, endurance is a more significant factor in the fight, and therefore more a training camp will include more endurance training. Most training camp schedules also include a planned rest day.

Coaches and athletes also use a training camp to analyse the upcoming opponents fighting style and skills, and develop counter strategies specifically for the bout. Coaches then use this information to better optimise the martial arts training regimens, by focusing skill development in areas and skills specific suited to counter those of the opponent. For example, if a fighter is chiefly a striker or boxer, but their opponent is a highly skilled Brazilian jiu-jitsu practitioner, they will train for takedown defence and escapes from various grappling positions.

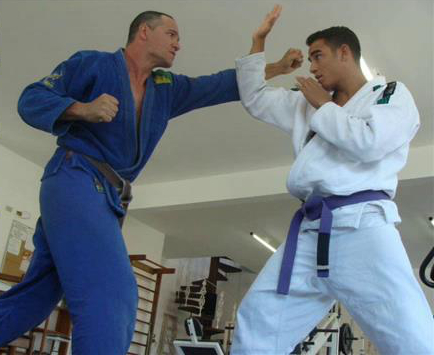
Jiu-Jitsu practitioners training striking.

=== Additional considerations ===
Training camps also function to help a fighter cut weight prior to the weigh-in. This entails optimising a nutritional program, and physically and emotionally preparing a fighter for the weight cutting process, if necessary. These training camps also factor in the biological effects of severe weight cutting, and therefore typically also contain a ‘recovery week’ immediately prior to the event. This week may not be a full week, and includes a reduction in training, allowing a fighter to feel stronger and more refreshed immediately prior to the event.

Recovery is also an essential element of an optimised training camp. In reflection of the format of an MMA fight, in which fighters have a minute rest between rounds, most training exercises follow high intensity interval training structures. Coaches often work alongside physiotherapists and similar medical practitioners for the duration of a training camp, in order to ensure the athlete does not incur any injuries or reinflame previous injuries. Various active methods are used for recovery during a training camp, including massage therapy, cryotherapy, hydration, and non-steroidal anti-inflammatory medications. Recovery can also be attained through low intensity low volume training, during which the fighter can taper off their training. Coaches can also reduce the risk of overtraining and burnout through using different training styles and exercises, in order to stimulate the fighter.

Some athletes and coaches choose to conduct training camps in high altitude locations, in order to incur the benefits of altitude training. Similarly, training camps for bouts occurring in locations with significantly different climates may be conducted in those locations, in order to better facilitate physiological adjustment to the new environment.

=== Notable training camps ===
See List of professional MMA training camps for a comprehensive list.

The following is a list of the most notable MMA training camps, most of which are run by ex-professional MMA athletes:

| Camp | Coaches | Notable fighters | Location |
| American Kickboxing Academy | Javier Mendez; Bob Cook; Leandro Viera | Cain Velasquez; Daniel Cormier; Khabib Nurmagomedov; BJ Penn; Luke Rockhold | San Jose, California, USA |
| Jackson-Wink MMA | Greg Jackson; Mike Winkeljohn | Jon Jones; Holly Holm; Georges St Pierre; Rashad Evans | Albuquerque, New Mexico, USA |
| Roufusport | Duke Roufus; Daniel Wanderley; Scott Cushman | Anthony Pettis; Tyron Woodley; Rose Namajunas | Milwaukee, Wisconsin, USA |

== Team sports ==
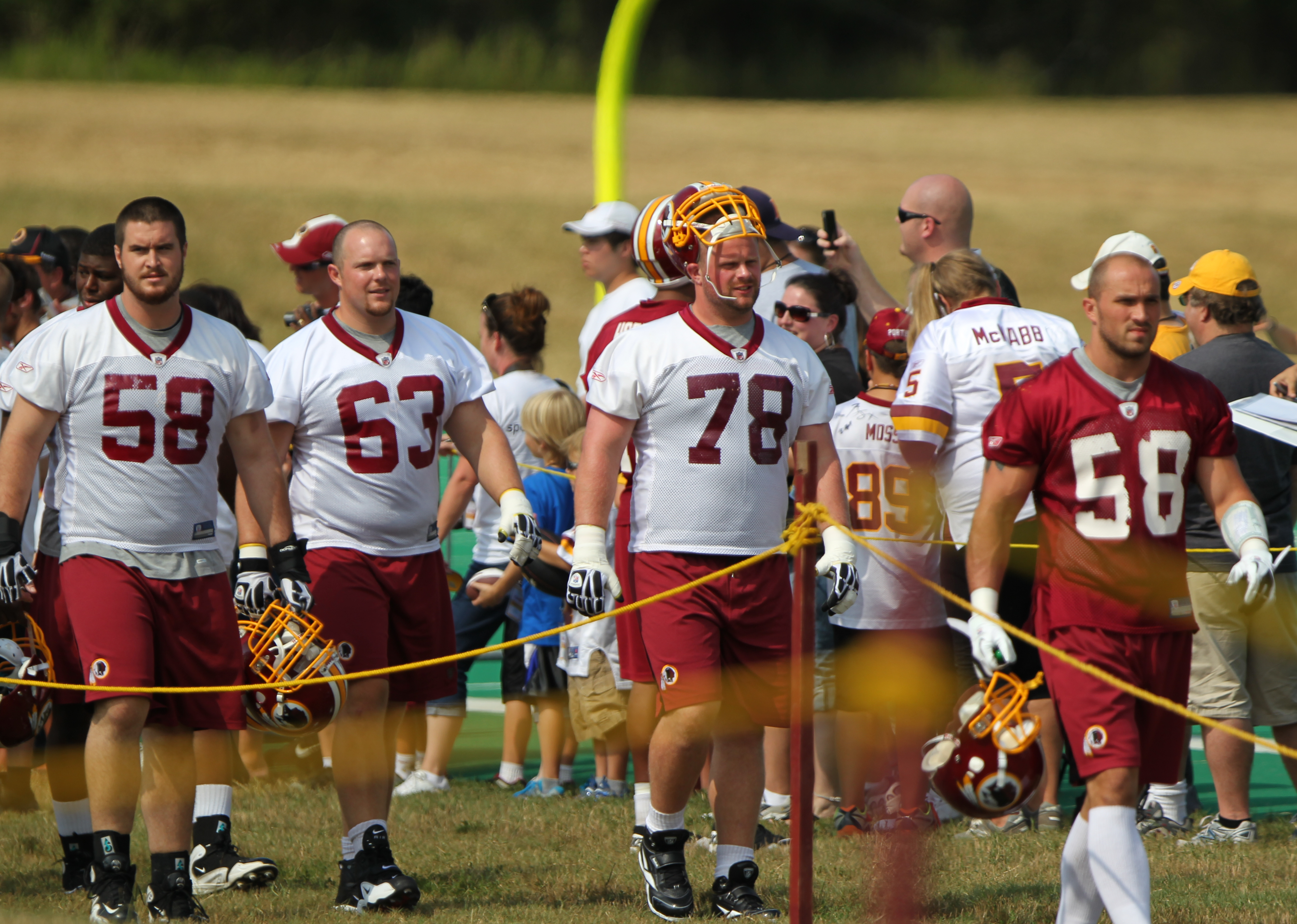
Washington Redskins offensive linemen at a training camp.

Professional teams competing in most sports have training camps, generally prior to the start of the season. These training camps provide a set time in which a team can develop their skills, as well as improve their cohesiveness and strategies.

=== Structure ===
Training camps can take place for up to several months prior to a season start. In some professional competitions, such as rugby union, players may already be training and competing in different competitions, and therefore do not require a lengthy training camp. Highly established and wealthy teams often have their training camps at their own personalised training facility, often in their local region. Alternatively, weather patterns or other factors may inhibit training, so the training camps are held in locations with more suitable weather. In some sports, especially water, beach, and winter sports, training requires specific conditions or venues, and so teams will travel to a suitable facility to conduct their training camp.

Managers and coaches often recruit additional coaches and players to join training camps to provide new exercises and opponents for stimulating and challenging training. Some professional teams have a practice squad, who are players who are not actively competing, but are solely on the team to help facilitate training. These players are often in the practice squad with the aim of eventually being included in the main competitive team.

While different sports obviously have significant differences in their day-to-day training routines, the general structure is similar between most team sports. Teams typically use scheduled training cycles, which may include training for aerobic and anaerobic exercise, speed training, and team-building exercises. In sports such as basketball and futsal, teams often have training for strategic situational plays. In this training segment, they will practise cued strategies and movements in preparation for a particular response from their opponents.

=== Additional considerations ===
Training camps can also have a significant focus on team bonding and cohesiveness. Coaches will also incorporate routine bonding and trust building exercises, in order to improve the team’s mentality and cohesiveness. In some instances, coaches or managers will devise bonding exercises which fail, and can be detrimental to team performance.

Training camps can also be used to study competing teams tactics and play styles, and devise strategies to effectively combat those tactics.

== Examples ==
- Spring training in baseball
- G4's Training Camp
- Boot camp
  - Citizens Military Training Camp
  - Camp Bullis, Camp Blanding, many more
- Terrorist training camp
  - Afghan training camp
    - Category:Afghan training camps
- List of professional MMA training camps
