= Malcolm Gordon (fighter) =

Canadian mixed martial arts fighter

- Born: May 19, 1990 (age 36); Calgary, Alberta, Canada
- Other names: X
- Height: 5 ft 7 in (1.70 m)
- Weight: 125 lb (57 kg; 8 st 13 lb)
- Division: Flyweight
- Reach: 71 in (180 cm)
- Fighting out of: Toronto, Ontario, Canada
- Team: Adrenaline MMA Training & Fitness; Toronto BJJ
- Rank: Brazilian Jiu-Jitsu black belt under Jorge Britto
- Years active: 2012–2024

Mixed martial arts record
- Total: 22
- Wins: 14
- By knockout: 5
- By submission: 6
- By decision: 3
- Losses: 8
- By knockout: 5
- By submission: 3

Other information
- Mixed martial arts record from Sherdog

Malcolm Gordon (born May 19, 1990) is a Canadian former mixed martial artist who competed in the Flyweight division of the Ultimate Fighting Championship. He is the former TKO, WXC and HFC Flyweight Champion, and PMMA Bantamweight Champion.

== Background ==
Gordon started in martial arts with Brazilian jiu-jitsu and kickboxing in Calgary, Alberta. At 19, he began spending time training in Las Vegas under the late Shawn Tompkins, a Canadian coach who had also worked with Sam Stout, Mark Hominick and Chris Horodecki.

== Mixed martial arts career ==
=== Early career ===
After starting his professional career by winning his first four bouts, all by finish, Gordon made his Bellator debut at Bellator 119, where he defeated Chris Kelades via unanimous decision. After going 5–0 to start his career, Gordon lost his next two bouts via KO/TKO. Gordon would bounce back at the end of 2015 with a unanimous decision victory at WXC 59 over Shawn Mack. Gordon made his professional debut for TKO MMA against Dimitri Waardenburg in November 2016, winning his next two bouts via first-round stoppages. Losing the bout in the first round, Gordon returned to WXC, where he defended his flyweight title against Michael Jordan at WXC 69, winning the bout via first-round knockout in only 17 seconds.

After a 21-month break, Gordon returned to challenge for the vacant TKO Flyweight title against Jordan Graham at TKO 42. Winning the bout and the title via first-round kimura, Gordon returned to the cage five months later to defend his title against James Mancini at TKO Fight Night 1. Gordon defended his crown via round two armbar, and in his last bout on the regionals before signing with the UFC, Gordon faced The Ultimate Fighter: Tournament of Champions fighter Yoni Sherbatov at TKO 47, where he defeated him by way of rear-naked choke.

=== Ultimate Fighting Championship ===
Gordon made his UFC debut on July 18, 2020, against Amir Albazi at UFC Fight Night: Figueiredo vs. Benavidez 2. Amir and Gordon both had only two weeks' notice as they replaced Tagir Ulanbekov and Aleksander Doskalchuk, who pulled out of the event following the death of Abdulmanap Nurmagomedov. Amir defeated Gordon by submission inside 4 minutes and 42 seconds of the first round.

Gordon faced Su Mudaerji on November 28, 2020, at UFC on ESPN: Smith vs. Clark. He lost the fight via knockout less than a minute into round one.

Gordon faced Francisco Figueiredo on July 17, 2021, at UFC on ESPN 26. He won the fight via unanimous decision.

Gordon was scheduled to face Denys Bondar on November 20, 2021, at UFC Fight Night 198. However, Gordon withdrew from the event for undisclosed reasons. The bout was rescheduled and occurred at UFC Fight Night 200 on February 5, 2022. Gordon won the fight via technical knockout in round one after Bondar broke his arm trying to get up.

Gordon was scheduled to face Allan Nascimento on August 13, 2022, at UFC on ESPN 41. However, Gordon pulled out in late July due to an undisclosed injury.

Gordon faced Muhammad Mokaev on October 22, 2022, at UFC 280. He lost the bout via armbar at the end of the third round.

Gordon faced Jake Hadley on March 18, 2023, at UFC 286. At the weigh-ins, Gordon weighed in at 129.5 pounds, three and a half pounds over the flyweight non-title fight limit. The bout is expected to proceed at catchweight, and he will be fined 30% of his purse, which will go to his opponent, Hadley. Gordon lost the fight via TKO in the first round.

Gordon faced Jimmy Flick on January 20, 2024, at UFC 297. At the weigh-in, Gordon weighed in at 127.5 pounds, one and a half pounds over the flyweight non-title fight limit. As a result, the bout took place at catchweight and Gordon was fined 20% of his purse, which went to his opponent Flick. Gordon lost by arm-triangle submission in the second round. After the loss, Gordon announced his retirement from competing in professional MMA.

== Championships and accomplishments ==
=== Mixed martial arts ===
- TKO Major League MMA
  - TKO Flyweight Championship (One time)
    - Two Successful Defenses
- Warrior Xtreme Cagefighting
  - WXC Flyweight Championship (One time)
    - One Successful Defense
- Prodigy MMA
  - PMMA Bantamweight Championship (One time)
- Havoc Fighting Championship
  - HFC Flyweight Championship (One time)

== Mixed martial arts record ==
Professional record breakdown
22 matches	14 wins	8 losses
By knockout	5	5
By submission	6	3
By decision	3	0

Res.	Record	Opponent	Method	Event	Date	Round	Time	Location	Notes
Loss	14–8	Jimmy Flick	Submission (arm-triangle choke)	UFC 297	January 20, 2024	2	1:17	Toronto, Ontario, Canada	Catchweight (127.5 lb) bout; Gordon missed weight.
Loss	14–7	Jake Hadley	TKO (punches)	UFC 286	March 18, 2023	1	1:01	London, England	Catchweight (129.5 lb) bout; Gordon missed weight.
Loss	14–6	Muhammad Mokaev	Submission (armbar)	UFC 280	October 22, 2022	3	4:26	Abu Dhabi, United Arab Emirates	
Win	14–5	Denys Bondar	TKO (arm injury)	UFC Fight Night: Hermansson vs. Strickland	February 5, 2022	1	1:22	Las Vegas, Nevada, United States	
Win	13–5	Francisco Figueiredo	Decision (unanimous)	UFC on ESPN: Makhachev vs. Moisés	July 17, 2021	3	5:00	Las Vegas, Nevada, United States	
Loss	12–5	Su Mudaerji	KO (punches)	UFC on ESPN: Smith vs. Clark	November 28, 2020	1	0:44	Las Vegas, Nevada, United States	
Loss	12–4	Amir Albazi	Submission (triangle choke)	UFC Fight Night: Figueiredo vs. Benavidez 2	July 18, 2020	1	4:42	Abu Dhabi, United Arab Emirates	Bantamweight bout.
Win	12–3	Yoni Sherbatov	Submission (rear-naked choke)	TKO 47	April 11, 2019	1	1:32	Montreal, Quebec, Canada	Defended the TKO Flyweight Championship.
Win	11–3	James Mancini	Submission (armbar)	TKO Fight Night 1	August 2, 2018	2	2:02	Montreal, Quebec, Canada	Defended the TKO Flyweight Championship.
Win	10–3	Jordan Graham	Submission (kimura)	TKO 42	March 16, 2018	1	3:26	Laval, Quebec, Canada	Won the vacant TKO Flyweight Championship.
Win	9–3	Michael Jordan	KO (punches)	WXC 69	July 14, 2017	1	0:17	Southgate, Michigan, United States	Defended the WXC Flyweight Championship.
Loss	8–3	Dimitri Waardenburg	TKO (punches)	TKO 36	November 4, 2016	1	4:09	Montreal, Quebec, Canada	Catchweight (130 lb) bout.
Win	8–2	Jesse Bazzi	Submission (kimura)	WXC 64	August 13, 2016	1	3:31	Taylor, Michigan, United States	Won the WXC Flyweight Championship.
Win	7–2	Andrew Cseh	KO (punches)	Prodigy MMA	May 28, 2016	1	4:04	Erie, Pennsylvania, United States	Won the PMMA Bantamweight Championship.
Win	6–2	Tashawn Mack	Decision (unanimous)	WXC 59	August 8, 2015	3	5:00	Taylor, Michigan, United States	
Loss	5–2	Austin Ryan	TKO (punches)	Havoc FC 8	March 27, 2015	2	3:20	Red Deer, Alberta, Canada	Lost the HFC Flyweight Championship.
Loss	5–1	Randy Turner	TKO (punches)	PFC 3: Showdown In The Downtown	October 18, 2014	2	3:17	London, Ontario, Canada	
Win	5–0	Chris Kelades	Decision (unanimous)	Bellator 119	May 9, 2014	3	5:00	Rama, Ontario, Canada	Catchweight (130 lb) bout.
Win	4–0	Michael Davis	Submission (kimura)	Havoc FC 4	January 31, 2014	2	2:16	Red Deer, Alberta, Canada	Won the vacant HFC Flyweight Championship.
Win	3–0	Lloyd Reyes	TKO (punches)	PFC 1: Unrivaled	October 26, 2013	1	3:38	London, Ontario, Canada	
Win	2–0	Ahmad Kakar	TKO (punches)	Substance Cage Combat 1	June 29, 2013	2	2:36	Toronto, Ontario, Canada	Bantamweight debut.
Win	1–0	Tyler Kirk	Submission (armbar)	Score Fighting Series 6	October 19, 2012	1	2:16	Sarnia, Ontario, Canada	Flyweight debut.

== See also ==
- List of male mixed martial artists
- List of Canadian UFC fighters
