= UFC on ESPN: Smith vs. Clark =

Mixed martial arts event in 2020

- The poster for UFC on ESPN: Smith vs. Clark
- Promotion: Ultimate Fighting Championship
- Date: November 28, 2020
- Venue: UFC Apex
- City: Enterprise, Nevada, United States
- Attendance: None (behind closed doors)

Event chronology
| UFC 255: Figueiredo vs. Perez | UFC on ESPN: Smith vs. Clark | UFC on ESPN: Hermansson vs. Vettori |

UFC on ESPN: Smith vs. Clark (also known as UFC on ESPN 18 and UFC Vegas 15) was a mixed martial arts event produced by the Ultimate Fighting Championship that took place on November 28, 2020, at the UFC Apex facility in Enterprise, Nevada, part of the Las Vegas Metropolitan Area, United States.

== Background ==
A heavyweight bout between Curtis Blaydes and former UFC Heavyweight Championship challenger Derrick Lewis was expected to serve as the event headliner. However, Blaydes tested positive for COVID-19 a day before the event and the bout was cancelled.

Shamil Gamzatov was briefly linked to a fight with Devin Clark at the event. However, Gamzatov was removed from the bout in mid-October due to alleged visa issues and replaced by former UFC Light Heavyweight Championship challenger Anthony Smith. Originally scheduled to be a three-round co-main event, this bout was promoted to serve as the new five-round headliner after the cancellation of the original main event.

A featherweight bout between Sean Woodson and Jonathan Pearce was scheduled for the event. However, Woodson withdrew a week before the event for unknown reasons and was replaced by Kai Kamaka III.

Renato Moicano and Rafael Fiziev were expected to meet in a lightweight bout at this event. However, Moicano pulled out on November 21 after testing positive for COVID-19 and the bout was rescheduled for UFC 256.

A flyweight bout between Amir Albazi and Zhalgas Zhumagulov was expected to take place at this event. However, it was announced on November 24 that Zhumagulov pulled out due to visa issues and the bout was rescheduled for UFC 257.

At the weigh-ins, Norma Dumont Viana weighed in at 139.5 pounds, three and a half pounds over the women's bantamweight non-title fight limit. Her bout proceeded at catchweight and she was fined 30% of her individual purse, which went to her opponent Ashlee Evans-Smith.

== Results ==
Main card (ESPN / ESPN+)
| Weight class | | | | Method | Round | Time | Notes |
|---|---|---|---|---|---|---|---|
| Light Heavyweight | Anthony Smith | def. | Devin Clark | Submission (triangle choke) | 1 | 2:34 |
| Welterweight | Miguel Baeza | def. | Takashi Sato | Submission (arm-triangle choke) | 2 | 4:28 |
| Heavyweight | Parker Porter | def. | Josh Parisian | Decision (unanimous) (30–26, 30–27, 29–28) | 3 | 5:00 |
| Featherweight | Bill Algeo | def. | Spike Carlyle | Decision (unanimous) (30–27, 30–27, 30–27) | 3 | 5:00 |
| Catchweight (139.5 lb) | Norma Dumont | def. | Ashlee Evans-Smith | Decision (unanimous) (30–26, 30–26, 30–26) | 3 | 5:00 |
| Featherweight | Jonathan Pearce | def. | Kai Kamaka III | TKO (punches) | 2 | 4:28 |
Preliminary card (ESPN+)
| Bantamweight | Anderson dos Santos | def. | Martin Day | Submission (guillotine choke) | 1 | 4:35 |
| Women's Flyweight | Gina Mazany | def. | Rachael Ostovich | TKO (body kicks) | 3 | 4:10 |
| Flyweight | Su Mudaerji | def. | Malcolm Gordon | KO (punches) | 1 | 0:44 |
| Catchweight (140 lb) | Nate Maness | def. | Luke Sanders | Submission (rear-naked choke) | 2 | 2:29 |

== Bonus awards ==
The following fighters received $50,000 bonuses.

- Fight of the Night: No bonus awarded.
- Performance of the Night: Anthony Smith, Miguel Baeza, Su Mudaerji and Nathan Maness

== See also ==
- List of UFC events
- List of current UFC fighters
- 2020 in UFC
