= Jonathan Martinez =

American mixed martial artist (born 1994)

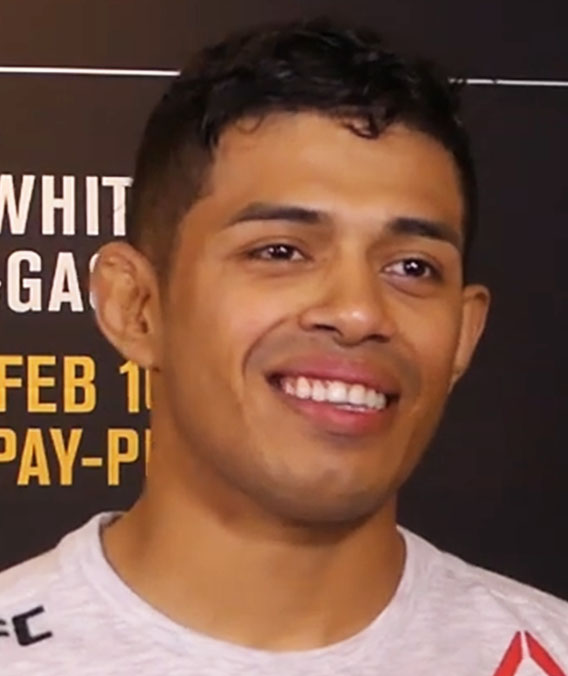
- Martinez at UFC 234 in 2019
- Born: April 20, 1994 (age 32); Los Angeles, California, U.S.
- Nickname: The Dragon
- Height: 5 ft 7 in (1.70 m)
- Weight: 135 lb (61 kg; 9 st 9 lb)
- Division: Flyweight (2014–2015); Bantamweight (2014–present); Featherweight (2020, 2022)
- Reach: 70 in (178 cm)
- Fighting out of: Plainview, Texas, U.S.
- Team: Academy of Mixed Martial Arts (formerly); Different Breed MMA (formerly); Factory X (2018–2024); MTZ Fight Club (2023–present); Ohana Academy (2024–present)
- Rank: Purple belt in Brazilian Jiu-Jitsu
- Years active: 2014–present

Mixed martial arts record
- Total: 25
- Wins: 19
- By knockout: 9
- By submission: 2
- By decision: 8
- Losses: 6
- By knockout: 1
- By decision: 4
- By disqualification: 1

Other information
- Website: jonathanmartinez.com
- Mixed martial arts record from Sherdog

Jonathan Martinez (born April 20, 1994) is an American professional mixed martial artist who competed in the Bantamweight division of the Ultimate Fighting Championship (UFC).

== Background ==
Martinez from a Salvadoran mother and Mexican father was born and grew up in California and moved with his family to Plainview, Texas, at the age of 13. At the age of 14, his father took him to Taekwondo class to learn discipline, which eventually led to mixed martial arts training.

== Mixed martial arts career ==
=== Early career ===
Martinez started his professional MMA career since 2014. He amassed a record of 9–1 prior to being signed by the UFC.

=== Ultimate Fighting Championship ===
Martinez made his UFC debut on October 27, 2018 on UFC Fight Night: Volkan vs. Smith, replacing an injured Gavin Tucker against Andre Soukhamthath. After getting knocked down multiple times, Martinez lost the fight via unanimous decision.

Martinez's next fight came on February 9, 2019 at UFC 234 against Wuliji Buren. Martinez won the fight via unanimous decision.

Martinez faced Liu Pingyuan on July 13, 2019 at UFC Fight Night: de Randamie vs. Ladd. He won the fight via knockout in round three. This win earned him the Performance of the Night award.

As the last fight of his prevailing contract, Martinez faced Andre Ewell on February 8, 2020 at UFC 247. He lost the fight via split decision. Right after the bout, Martinez signed a new contract with the promotion.

Martinez faced Frankie Saenz on August 1, 2020 at UFC Fight Night: Brunson vs. Shahbazyan. At the weigh-ins, Martinez weighed in at 140.5 pounds, four and a half pounds over the bantamweight non-title fight limit. His bout proceeded at a catchweight and he was fined 30 percent of his purse, which went to Saenz. After knocking Saenz down multiple times, Martinez won the fight via TKO in the third round.

Martinez faced Thomas Almeida on October 18, 2020 at UFC Fight Night 180. He won the fight via unanimous decision.

Martinez faced Davey Grant on March 13, 2021 at UFC Fight Night 187. Despite knocking Grant down in the first round, Martinez ultimately lost the fight via knockout in round two.

Martinez was scheduled to face Nathaniel Wood on September 4, 2021 at UFC Fight Night 191. However, Wood was removed from the bout in mid-August for undisclosed reasons and replaced by Marcelo Rojo. At the weigh-ins, Martinez weighed in at 138 pounds, two pounds over the bantamweight non-title fight limit. The bout was scrapped after Martinez withdrew due to complications from the weight cut.

Martinez was scheduled to face Aaron Phillips, replacing Kris Moutinho on October 23, 2021 at UFC Fight Night 196. However, Philips withdrew from the bout due to illness and was replaced by Zviad Lazishvili. Martinez won the fight via unanimous decision.

Martinez faced Alejandro Pérez on February 26, 2022 at UFC Fight Night 202. He won the fight via unanimous decision.

Martinez faced Vince Morales on May 21, 2022 at UFC Fight Night 206. He won the fight via unanimous decision.

Martinez faced Cub Swanson on October 15, 2022 at UFC Fight Night 212. He won the fight via technical knockout in round two. This win earned him the Performance of the Night award.

Martinez faced Said Nurmagomedov on March 11, 2023, at UFC Fight Night 221. He won the fight via unanimous decision. 13 out of 17 media outlets scored the bout as a victory for Nurmagomedov.

Martinez faced Adrian Yañez on October 14, 2023, at UFC Fight Night 230. He won the fight via TKO in round two. This win earned him the Performance of the Night award.

Martinez faced José Aldo on May 4, 2024, at UFC 301. He lost the fight by unanimous decision.

Martinez faced Marcus McGhee on November 16, 2024 at UFC 309. He lost the fight by unanimous decision.

== Personal life ==
Jonathan and his wife Amber have three children.

== Championships and awards ==
- Ultimate Fighting Championship
  - Performance of the Night (Three times) vs. Liu Pingyuan, Cub Swanson, and Adrian Yañez
- Xtreme Fighting League
  - XFL Flyweight Championship (one time; former)
  - XFL Bantamweight Championship (one time; former)

== Mixed martial arts record ==
Professional record breakdown
25 matches	19 wins	6 losses
By knockout	9	1
By submission	2	0
By decision	8	4
By disqualification	0	1

Res.	Record	Opponent	Method	Event	Date	Round	Time	Location	Notes
Loss	19–6	Marcus McGhee	Decision (unanimous)	UFC 309	November 16, 2024	3	5:00	New York City, New York, United States	
Loss	19–5	José Aldo	Decision (unanimous)	UFC 301	May 4, 2024	3	5:00	Rio de Janeiro, Brazil	
Win	19–4	Adrian Yañez	TKO (leg kick)	UFC Fight Night: Yusuff vs. Barboza	October 14, 2023	2	2:26	Las Vegas, Nevada, United States	Performance of the Night.
Win	18–4	Said Nurmagomedov	Decision (unanimous)	UFC Fight Night: Yan vs. Dvalishvili	March 11, 2023	3	5:00	Las Vegas, Nevada, United States	
Win	17–4	Cub Swanson	TKO (leg kick)	UFC Fight Night: Grasso vs. Araújo	October 15, 2022	2	4:19	Las Vegas, Nevada, United States	Performance of the Night.
Win	16–4	Vince Morales	Decision (unanimous)	UFC Fight Night: Holm vs. Vieira	May 21, 2022	3	5:00	Las Vegas, Nevada, United States	
Win	15–4	Alejandro Pérez	Decision (unanimous)	UFC Fight Night: Makhachev vs. Green	February 26, 2022	3	5:00	Las Vegas, Nevada, United States	Featherweight bout.
Win	14–4	Zviad Lazishvili	Decision (unanimous)	UFC Fight Night: Costa vs. Vettori	October 23, 2021	3	5:00	Las Vegas, Nevada, United States	
Loss	13–4	Davey Grant	KO (punch)	UFC Fight Night: Edwards vs. Muhammad	March 13, 2021	2	3:03	Las Vegas, Nevada, United States	
Win	13–3	Thomas Almeida	Decision (unanimous)	UFC Fight Night: Ortega vs. The Korean Zombie	October 18, 2020	3	5:00	Abu Dhabi, United Arab Emirates	Featherweight bout.
Win	12–3	Frankie Saenz	TKO (knee and punches)	UFC Fight Night: Brunson vs. Shahbazyan	August 1, 2020	3	0:57	Las Vegas, Nevada, United States	Catchweight (140.5 lb) bout; Martinez missed weight.
Loss	11–3	Andre Ewell	Decision (split)	UFC 247	February 8, 2020	3	5:00	Houston, Texas, United States	
Win	11–2	Liu Pingyuan	KO (knee)	UFC Fight Night: de Randamie vs. Ladd	July 13, 2019	3	3:53	Sacramento, California, United States	Performance of the Night.
Win	10–2	Wuliji Buren	Decision (unanimous)	UFC 234	February 9, 2019	3	5:00	Melbourne, Australia	
Loss	9–2	Andre Soukhamthath	Decision (unanimous)	UFC Fight Night: Volkan vs. Smith	October 27, 2018	3	5:00	Moncton, New Brunswick, Canada	
Win	9–1	Randy Hinds	Submission (armbar)	FFL: Fist Fight Night 2	September 30, 2017	1	0:56	Amarillo, Texas, United States	Return to Bantamweight.
Win	8–1	Jesse Cruz	Submission (armbar)	Combate Americas: Road to the Championship 3	April 18, 2016	1	2:17	Los Angeles, California, United States	Catchweight (130 lb) bout.
Loss	7–1	Matt Schnell	DQ (illegal knee)	Legacy FC 49	December 4, 2015	2	2:21	Bossier City, Louisiana, United States	Flyweight bout.
Win	7–0	Ryan Hollis	Decision (unanimous)	GCS 3: Hub City Havoc	April 25, 2015	3	5:00	Lubbock, Texas, United States	Catchweight (130 lb) bout.
Win	6–0	C.J. Vergara	Decision (split)	Fury FC 3	January 24, 2015	3	5:00	San Antonio, Texas, United States	Flyweight bout.
Win	5–0	Xavier Siller	TKO (punches)	XFL: Rage on the River 5	November 15, 2014	2	1:03	Grant, Oklahoma, United States	Won the XFL Bantamweight Championship.
Win	4–0	Adrian Hudson	TKO (punches)	XFL: Rage on the River 4	July 27, 2014	5	1:01	Tulsa, Oklahoma, United States	
Win	3–0	Micah Stockton	TKO (punches)	XFL: Rage on the River 3	April 18, 2014	3	0:44	Tulsa, Oklahoma, United States	Won the XFL Flyweight Championship.
Win	2–0	Marshon Ball	KO (flying knee)	Rumble Time Promotions: Destruction	March 14, 2014	1	1:23	St. Charles, Missouri, United States	
Win	1–0	Archie Lowe	KO (flying knee)	C3 Fights: Border Wars 2014	February 8, 2014	2	2:21	Newkirk, Oklahoma, United States	

== See also ==
- List of male mixed martial artists
