= UFC Fight Night: Figueiredo vs. Benavidez 2 =

UFC mixed martial arts event in 2020

- The poster for UFC Fight Night: Figueiredo vs. Benavidez 2
- Promotion: Ultimate Fighting Championship
- Date: July 19, 2020
- Venue: du Forum
- City: Abu Dhabi, United Arab Emirates
- Attendance: None (behind closed doors)

Event chronology
UFC on ESPN: Kattar vs. Ige	UFC Fight Night: Figueiredo vs. Benavidez 2	UFC on ESPN: Whittaker vs. Till

UFC Fight Night: Figueiredo vs. Benavidez 2 (also known as UFC Fight Night 172, UFC on ESPN+ 30 and UFC Fight Island 2) was a mixed martial arts event produced by the Ultimate Fighting Championship that took place on July 19, 2020 at the du Forum on Yas Island, Abu Dhabi, United Arab Emirates.

== Background ==
This event was the third of four UFC Fight Island events scheduled to take place on Yas Island in July 2020, following UFC 251 and UFC on ESPN: Kattar vs. Ige, as part of a plan to facilitate the hosting of events involving fighters impacted by U.S. travel restrictions related to the COVID-19 pandemic.

Without fans in attendance, the promotion did not have to worry about the local timing of the event, so the event proceeded with normal timing for prime time hours on the east coast of North America. The main card began at 5:00 am (July 19) local time in Abu Dhabi, with a full preliminary card beginning at approximately 2:00 am Gulf Standard Time.

A UFC Flyweight Championship rematch for the vacant title between Deiveson Figueiredo and former title challenger Joseph Benavidez took place as the headliner. With former UFC Flyweight and Bantamweight Champion Henry Cejudo vacating his flyweight title in December 2019, the pairing then met at UFC Fight Night: Benavidez vs. Figueiredo in February to determine the new champion. Figueiredo won via second-round TKO, but the title remained vacant because he missed weight. On July 11, it was announced that Figueiredo tested positive for COVID-19, leaving the title bout in jeopardy. According to his manager, Wallid Ismail, a second test was administered before an official decision was made regarding Figueiredo's possible removal from the event. Ismail said that Figueiredo already tested positive for COVID-19 two months ago and believes that this test was a false positive. A day later, it was confirmed that Figueiredo passed his second test and would travel to Abu Dhabi, though he still needed to pass other tests upon arrival. He passed multiple tests in Abu Dhabi, clearing the fight for the main event.

A heavyweight bout between Sergey Spivak and Carlos Felipe was scheduled for the original May 9 date of UFC 250 that later became UFC 249, but was eventually scrapped due to that change. The pairing was rescheduled for this event.

A light heavyweight bout between Roman Dolidze and Khadis Ibragimov was initially scheduled for the promotion's inaugural event in Kazakhstan planned a month prior. However, the fight was postponed after the card was moved to Las Vegas due to travel restrictions for both participants related to the COVID-19 pandemic. The pairing was left intact and rescheduled for this event.

A lightweight bout between Davi Ramos and Arman Tsarukyan was expected to take place at UFC Fight Night: Overeem vs. Harris, but was postponed as the event was cancelled. The pairing was moved to this event.

A lightweight bout between Marc Diakiese and Alan Patrick was scheduled for the event. However, Patrick withdrew on June 14 for an unknown reason and was replaced by Rafael Fiziev.

Tagir Ulanbekov was expected to face Aleksander Doskalchuk in a flyweight bout at this event. However, Ulanbekov pulled out on July 3 after Abdulmanap Nurmagomedov, father of current UFC Lightweight Champion Khabib Nurmagomedov, died from complications related to COVID-19. In turn, Doskalchuk pulled out a week later due to undisclosed reasons. They were replaced by Malcolm Gordon and Amir Albazi respectively.

== Results ==
Main card (ESPN+)
Weight class				Method	Round	Time	Notes
Flyweight	Deiveson Figueiredo	def.	Joseph Benavidez	Technical Submission (rear-naked choke)	1	4:48	(Note: For the vacant UFC Flyweight Championship.)
Middleweight	Jack Hermansson	def.	Kelvin Gastelum	Submission (heel hook)	1	1:18
Lightweight	Rafael Fiziev	def.	Marc Diakiese	Decision (unanimous) (30–27, 29–28, 29–28)	3	5:00
Women's Flyweight	Ariane Lipski	def.	Luana Carolina	Submission (kneebar)	1	1:28
Flyweight	Askar Askarov	def.	Alexandre Pantoja	Decision (unanimous) (29–28, 29–28, 29–28)	3	5:00
Preliminary card (ESPN / ESPN+)
Light Heavyweight	Roman Dolidze	def.	Khadis Ibragimov	TKO (knee and punches)	1	4:15
Catchweight (150 lb)	Grant Dawson	def.	Nad Narimani	Decision (unanimous) (30–26, 30–27, 29–27)	3	5:00
Lightweight	Joel Álvarez	def.	Joseph Duffy	Submission (guillotine choke)	1	2:25
Bantamweight	Brett Johns	def.	Montel Jackson	Decision (unanimous) (29–28, 29–28, 29–28)	3	5:00
Bantamweight	Amir Albazi	def.	Malcolm Gordon	Submission (triangle choke)	1	4:42
Lightweight	Arman Tsarukyan	def.	Davi Ramos	Decision (unanimous) (30–27, 30–27, 29–28)	3	5:00
Heavyweight	Serghei Spivac	def.	Carlos Felipe	Decision (majority) (28–28, 29–27, 29–27)	3	5:00

== Bonus awards ==
The following fighters received $50,000 bonuses.

- Fight of the Night: Rafael Fiziev vs. Marc Diakiese
- Performance of the Night: Deiveson Figueiredo and Ariane Lipski

== See also ==
- List of UFC events
- List of current UFC fighters
- 2020 in UFC
