= Allan Nascimento =

Brazilian mixed martial artist (1991–2026)

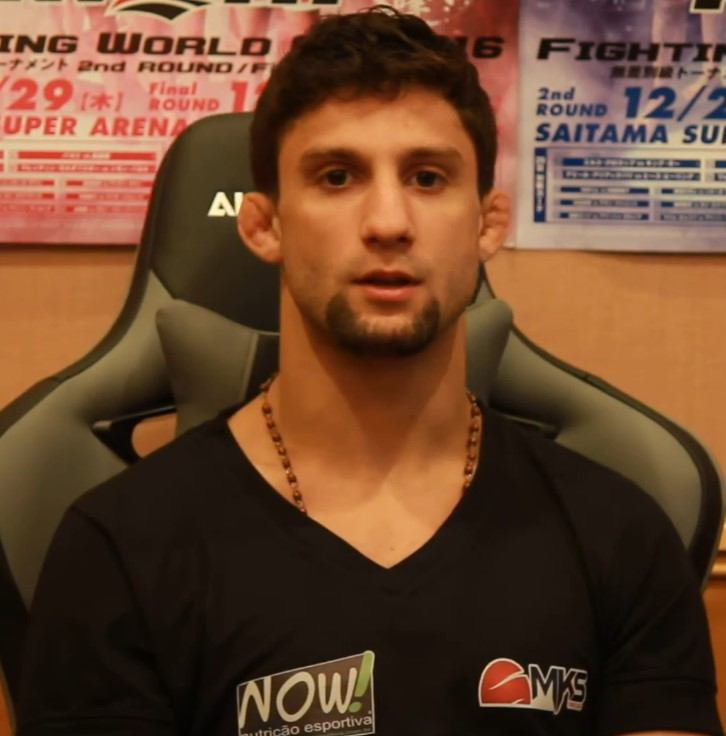
- Nascimento in 2016
- Born: Allan Alves do Nascimento; September 11, 1991; São Paulo, Brazil
- Died: August 3, 2026 (aged 34); São Paulo, Brazil
- Other names: Puro Osso
- Height: 5 ft 9 in (1.75 m)
- Weight: 130 lb (59 kg; 9 st 4 lb)
- Division: Flyweight; Bantamweight; Featherweight
- Reach: 69 in (175 cm)
- Fighting out of: São Paulo, Brazil
- Team: Chute Boxe Academy
- Years active: 2011–2026

Mixed martial arts record
- Total: 29
- Wins: 22
- By knockout: 2
- By submission: 15
- By decision: 5
- Losses: 7
- By decision: 7

Other information
- Mixed martial arts record from Sherdog

Allan Alves do Nascimento (September 11, 1991 – August 3, 2026) was a Brazilian mixed martial artist. A member of the Chute Boxe Academy, he competed in the Flyweight division of the Ultimate Fighting Championship (UFC) from 2021 until his death in 2026.

== Background ==
Nascimento was born in São Paulo, Brazil. He started training in Muay Thai at age of 15, thanks to a suggestion by a schoolmate. Despite his family not wanting him to be a professional fighter, he had a frank talk with them, and they supported his career.

== Mixed martial arts career ==
=== Early career ===
Nascimento started his professional career in 2011 and amassed a record of 17–4 in the Brazilian regional scene, including overseas bouts in the United States and Japan, before appearing on Dana White's Contender Series.

=== Dana White's Contender Series ===
Nascimento was invited to Dana White's Contender Series Brazil and faced Raulian Paiva on August 11, 2018. He lost the fight via split decision.

=== Ultimate Fighting Championship ===
From 2019, Nascimento had scheduled his four fights matchup but cancelled, he took first fight in 2021 and won by submission against Elivaldo Lima Martins. Nascimento made his UFC debut against Tagir Ulanbekov on October 30, 2021, at UFC 267. He lost the fight via split decision.

Replacing Francisco Figueiredo, Nascimento was scheduled to face Jake Hadley on March 19, 2022, at UFC Fight Night 204. However, Hadley eventually had to pull out due to injury. They were later rescheduled to meet at UFC on ESPN 36 on May 14, 2022. He won the fight via unanimous decision.

Nascimento was scheduled to face Malcolm Gordon on August 13, 2022, at UFC on ESPN 41. However, Gordon pulled out in late July due to an undisclosed injury and the bout has been cancelled.

He faced Carlos Hernandez on January 14, 2023, at UFC Fight Night 217. He won the fight via a rear-naked choke in round one. This fight earned him his first Performance of the Night award.

Nascimento was scheduled to face Tim Elliott on June 3, 2023, at UFC on ESPN 46. However on April 28, Nascimento pulled out due to undisclosed reasons and was replaced by Victor Altamirano.

He was scheduled to face Su Mudaerji on December 9, 2023, at UFC Fight Night 233. However, Nascimento withdrew from the fight due to injury and was replaced by Tim Elliott.

Nascimento was scheduled to face Jafel Filho on August 10, 2024, at UFC on ESPN 61. However, a few days before the event, Nascimento has withdrawn due to illness and the bout was cancelled.

Replacing Steve Erceg, Nascimento was scheduled to face Asu Almabayev on March 1, 2025, at UFC Fight Night 253. However, Almabayev was pulled to fight Manel Kape in the main event after Brandon Royval withdrew due to multiple concussions.

The bout between Nascimento and Jafel Filho took place on May 31, 2025, at UFC on ESPN 68. At the weigh-ins, Nascimento weighed in at 127.5 pounds, one and a half pounds over the flyweight non-title fight limit. The bout proceeded at catchweight and Nascimento was fined 20 percent of his purse which went to Filho. He won the fight via unanimous decision.

He was scheduled to face Rafael Estevam on November 1, 2025, at UFC Fight Night 263. However, Estevam withdrew for undisclosed reasons and was replaced by Cody Durden in a 130 lb catchweight bout. He won the fight via an anaconda choke in round two. This fight earned him another Performance of the Night award.

Nascimento was scheduled to face Mitch Raposo on April 18, 2026, at UFC Fight Night 273. However, Raposo was forced off just two days before the event due to illness, so the bout was re-scheduled and took place at UFC Fight Night 279 on June 20, 2026. He lost the fight via split decision.

== Personal life and death ==
Nascimento had a wife and two children. He earned the nickname "Puro Osso", Portuguese for "All Bones", due to his lean physique as a teenager. He lived in São Paulo throughout his life.

On August 3, 2026, Nascimento was found unresponsive in his home after suffering an apparent heart attack in his sleep. At the age of 34, he was pronounced dead at the scene by the responding medical team.

=== Tributes ===
News of Nascimento's death was first announced by the UFC, who described him as "a skilled competitor and consummate professional". "I mean, it's horrible," said UFC president Dana White. "It's just one of those freak, tragedy things that happened to a young guy that it shouldn't happen to." Chute Boxe Academy, Nascimento's longtime gym, called him "a warrior, a friend, a dedicated competitor, and an extraordinary human being" who inspired others. Tributes were also paid by former UFC champion Charles Oliveira and Elves Brener, both of whom were training partners of Nascimento at Chute Boxe, with Oliveira stating that his teammates would make sure Nascimento's legacy would never be forgotten. Nascimento's funeral was held on August 5, 2026, where attendees formed a guard of honor as his casket was carried by Chute Boxe members.

== Championships and accomplishments ==
- Ultimate Fighting Championship
  - Performance of the Night (Two times) vs. Carlos Hernandez and Cody Durden
- Gold Fight
  - Gold Fight Flyweight Championship (One time)
- Predador Fight Championship
  - Predador FC Bantamweight Championship (One time)

== Mixed martial arts record ==
Professional record breakdown
29 matches	22 wins	7 losses
By knockout	2	0
By submission	15	0
By decision	5	7

Res.	Record	Opponent	Method	Event	Date	Round	Time	Location	Notes
Loss	22–7	Mitch Raposo	Decision (split)	UFC Fight Night: Kape vs. Horiguchi	June 20, 2026	3	5:00	Las Vegas, Nevada, United States	
Win	22–6	Cody Durden	Submission (anaconda choke)	UFC Fight Night: Garcia vs. Onama	November 1, 2025	2	3:13	Las Vegas, Nevada, United States	Catchweight (130 lb) bout. Performance of the Night.
Win	21–6	Jafel Filho	Decision (unanimous)	UFC on ESPN: Gamrot vs. Klein	May 31, 2025	3	5:00	Las Vegas, Nevada, United States	Catchweight (127.5 lb) bout; Nascimento missed weight.
Win	20–6	Carlos Hernandez	Submission (rear-naked choke)	UFC Fight Night: Strickland vs. Imavov	January 14, 2023	1	3:16	Las Vegas, Nevada, United States	Performance of the Night.
Win	19–6	Jake Hadley	Decision (unanimous)	UFC on ESPN: Błachowicz vs. Rakić	May 14, 2022	3	5:00	Las Vegas, Nevada, United States	
Loss	18–6	Tagir Ulanbekov	Decision (split)	UFC 267	October 30, 2021	3	5:00	Abu Dhabi, United Arab Emirates	
Win	18–5	Elivaldo Lima Martins	Submission (rear-naked choke)	Punho de Aço 6	July 23, 2021	1	3:32	Ilha Solteira, Brazil	Bantamweight bout.
Loss	17–5	Raulian Paiva	Decision (split)	Dana White's Contender Series Brazil 3	August 11, 2018	3	5:00	Las Vegas, Nevada, United States	
Win	17–4	Haruki Armoa Onishi	Submission (armbar)	Batalha MMA 8	July 15, 2017	1	1:37	São Paulo, Brazil	Catchweight (130 lb) bout.
Loss	16–4	Yuki Motoya	Decision (split)	Rizin World Grand Prix 2016: 2nd Round	December 29, 2016	2	5:00	Saitama, Japan	Catchweight (132 lb) bout.
Win	16–3	Roberto Barbosa de Souza	Decision (unanimous)	Gold Fight 8	October 29, 2016	5	5:00	São Paulo, Brazil	Won the vacant Gold Fight Flyweight Championship.
Win	15–3	Patrique Tavares	Decision (unanimous)	Aspera FC 42	August 6, 2016	3	5:00	Cosmópolis, Brazil	
Loss	14–3	Bruno Azevedo	Decision (unanimous)	XFC International 9	March 15, 2015	5	5:00	São Paulo, Brazil	For the inaugural XFC Flyweight Championship.
Win	14–2	Ruslan Abiltarov	Decision (unanimous)	XFC International 7	November 1, 2014	3	5:00	São Paulo, Brazil	
Win	13–2	André Lourenço	Submission (brabo choke)	XFC International 5	June 7, 2014	1	3:03	São Paulo, Brazil	Return to Flyweight.
Win	12–2	Matias Vásquez Jimenez	Submission (armbar)	XFC International 4	March 29, 2014	3	4:20	São Paulo, Brazil	
Win	11–2	Alex Silva	Submission (rear-naked choke)	Standout Fighting Tournament 2	November 29, 2013	1	2:11	São Paulo, Brazil	
Loss	10–2	Ricardo Ramos	Decision (unanimous)	Elite FC 5	October 5, 2013	3	5:00	Campinas, Brazil	For the vacant Elite FC Bantamweight Championship.
Win	10–1	André Amaral Azevedo	Submission (heel hook)	Standout Fighting Tournament 1	September 20, 2013	1	1:25	São Paulo, Brazil	
Win	9–1	Julio Rodrigues	Submission (rear-naked choke)	X-Fight MMA 6	July 27, 2013	2	4:50	Matão, Brazil	
Win	8–1	Carlos André	Submission (triangle choke)	Bison Kombat 1	July 4, 2013	1	4:23	São Paulo, Brazil	Return to Bantamweight.
Loss	7–1	Will Campuzano	Decision (unanimous)	Legacy FC 19	April 12, 2013	5	5:00	Dallas, Texas, United States	Flyweight debut. For the Legacy FC Flyweight Championship.
Win	7–0	Leandro Charles	Submission (heel hook)	Predador FC 21	August 11, 2012	1	1:43	Campo Grande, Brazil	Won the Predador FC Bantamweight Championship.
Win	6–0	Terry Acker	Submission (kneebar)	Legacy FC 12	July 13, 2012	3	3:19	Houston, Texas, United States	
Win	5–0	Elias Macaco	TKO (submission to punches)	Fight Night Enjoy Drinking 3	April 21, 2012	1	3:27	São Paulo, Brazil	
Win	4–0	Luiz Ricardo	Submission (rear-naked choke)	Union Combat 1	April 4, 2012	1	1:29	São Paulo, Brazil	
Win	3–0	Emerson Piscina	TKO (corner stoppage)	Predador FC 20	March 10, 2012	2	4:22	São José do Rio Preto, Brazil	Return to Bantamweight.
Win	2–0	Elvis Guimarães	Submission (arm-triangle choke)	Morganti Contact 2	March 3, 2012	1	3:36	São Paulo, Brazil	Featherweight debut.
Win	1–0	Thiago Silva	Submission (triangle choke)	Thai Fight 3	November 29, 2011	1	2:21	São Paulo, Brazil	Bantamweight debut.

== See also ==
- List of male mixed martial artists
