= Never Say Never (2023 film) =

2023 Chinese film by Wang Baoqiang

- Official film poster

Chinese name
- Simplified Chinese: 八角笼中
Transcriptions
Standard Mandarin
- Hanyu Pinyin: Bā Jiǎo Lóng Zhōng
Yue: Cantonese
- Jyutping: Baat3 Gok3 Lung4 Zung1
- Directed by: Wang Baoqiang
- Screenplay by: Wang Baoqiang; Qi Qi
- Produced by: Feng Yanxi; Liu Yong
- Starring: Wang Baoqiang; Chen Yongsheng; Shi Pengyuan; Wang Xun
- Cinematography: Luo Pan
- Edited by: Zhang Yibo; Zhu Liyun
- Music by: Nathan Wang
- Production companies: Beijing Happy Pictures Cultural Communications Co. Tianjin Maoyan Weiying Culture Media; Tumxuk Sunflower Pictures; Wuxi Baotang Pictures
- Distributed by: Tianjin Maoyan Weiying Culture Media
- Release date: 6 July 2023 (China)
- Running time: 117 minutes
- Country: China
- Languages: Mandarin; Sichuanese dialect
- Box office: $304.3 million

Never Say Never (Chinese: 八角笼中; pinyin: Bā Jiǎo Lóng Zhōng) is a 2023 Chinese sports drama film starring and directed by Wang Baoqiang. The film was a box office success where it grossed $304.28 million, making it the 36th highest-grossing film in China of all time as of 2025.

== Plot ==
The film opens with a video of two young boys fighting in a mixed martial arts bout. The next scene shows that in 2011, Xiang Tenghui, a former MMA fighter has been arrested for being responsible for this fight and is held for interrogation for questioning.

The film then goes back to 2001 in Longshan, Sichuan province. Xiang Tenghui runs a Sand mining business with his friend Wang Feng. One day when driving along a remote road at night, Xiang's lorry is attacked by bandits who were revealed to be a gang of boys. Wang recommends that Xiang sells the business to rival Li Sancai as it is not making any money. Instead Xiang visits local entrepreneur Wang Jingfu and obtains financial backing to build a children's fight club that will produce champions and advertise Wang's new product. Xiang and Wang then round up the gang of kids who previously attacked them and made them an offer to accept joining the club in exchange for food and lodging. They all accept and the two oldest members of the group were noted to be named Ma Hu and Su Mu.

A few weeks later, Wang Jingfu is arrested for peddling fake goods leading to funding for the club being halted. Xiang is reluctant to continue but the club members still want to train under him. It is revealed Su ad Ma have a sister who is unable to walk due to paralysis which was one of the reasons, Xiang decided. As they were from impoverished background with nowhere to return, Xiang agrees to continue but stresses he will only teach them how to fight for stage combat. Xiang makes a deal with local bar-owner Li to have his club performed using a steel cage as an attraction. Ma and Su perform in its first event but the customers immediately notice the fighters are faking it. After Xiang yells at the two to put more effort into it, the staged performance ends up becoming a real brawl which attracted all the customers attentions. Afterwards, the club continued to have more successful performances and eventually got an offer to perform at the provincial capital. However some thugs disrupt a fight between Ma and Su claiming its fake and eventually a real brawl breaks out where Ma almost stabs one of the thugs. Wang helps Xiang and the two boys escape but is injured and gets arrested. Later Xiang bails out Wang but is told that he should train the boys for real so they can become real champions.

Xiang later visits his family home where his mother has his awards. It is then revealed that Xiang was previously an MMA provincial champion but was stripped of his gold medal after his urine sample tested positive for performance-enhancing drugs (PEDs). His coach had tricked him into taking pills and had set him up. As a result, Xiang attacked his coach and was sentenced to jail for assault. After coming to terms with his past, Xiang decides to change his fighting club to train its members to fight for real.

10 years later in 2011, the club has grown in size to become very successful and even could employ teachers to provide its members with education. Due to the club's fame rising, an old video was posted on the internet of Ma and Su fighting as children. Ma and Su were successful fighters and were going to participate in a national tournament but due to the video going viral, they were suspended from participating in the tournament. Xiang received an offer from an established MMA club, CJ to sign contracts for Ma and Su so they could participate in the tournament. When Xiang revealed to Ma and Su that they were going to move to CJ, they were furious but Xiang said had the right to do it. Later on as the video went viral, people throughout China were outraged and the authorities steps in to shut down the club.

A year later, Xiang who is now running a Silk business was told that he had received an invitation from a talk show wanting to hear his side of the story regarding his fight club but he stated he was not interested. He then visited the sister of Ma and Su who now was living in better conditions thanks to money from him. She had received postcards from Ma and Su where they stated they were on tour in China as they were fighting in different venues. However Xiang noticed all the postcards had the same stamp and went to the address based on them. He then goes an isolated road at night and is involved in a car crash where he finds out that Ma tried to rob another car. Xiang then goes to an apartment to find Su alone, unable to walk. It was revealed after Ma and Su were transferred to CJ, Su was required to take PEDs as part of its but refused and was beaten to a point that his legs were crippled. Ma then resorted to banditry in an attempt to get money to pay for Su's surgery. Xiang went to CJ asking for Ma and Su to be released from their contract but was beaten up and stated he needed to pay the breach fee for their release.

Xiang then went on the talk show where two clips were played. The first was of Ma who was now in jail for robbery stated that Xiang had tricked them and made them sign slavery contracts and were tossed aside. The second was from the previous year of children crying while leaving the club and had spoken out in defense of Xiang. Xiang stated to an angry audience that he admitted that he tricked children into fighting so they could have a future and stated since no one else was there for them, they had no right to interfere with what he did. Later on Su visits Ma in jail where he tells Ma that due to the talk show going viral, CJ was investigated and its owner was arrested for use of PEDs as well as assault. Due to pressure from outside, CJ was forced to release Ma and Su from their contracts. In addition Su had now recovered after a successful leg surgery and could fight again.

Two year later, Su is fighting for FGP world Lightweight championship in a 5-round bout against its reigning champion, Connor who is from Brazil. For the first and most of the second round, Su is outclassed by the champion mainly due to his superior grappling. However, in the final seconds of the second round, Su escapes from a rear naked choke and uses the opportunity to knock out Connor to become champion. The final scene shows Xiang who was watching the fight from behind the stands, smoke a cigar while walking away. In the film's epilogue, it is revealed that the government has allowed the club to run again and Ma who was now released from prison went back to his profession as an MMA fighter.

== Cast ==
- Wang Baoqiang as Xiang Tenghui
- Chen Yongsheng as Ma Hu (adult)
- Shi Pengyuan as Su Mu (adult)
- Wang Xun as Wang Feng
- Zhang Yirong as Su Mu's sister
- Xiao Yang as Wang Jingfu
- Liu Hua as Li
- Li Chen as Director Xie
- Xing Yu as Owner of CJ
- Li Meng as Talk Show Host

== Production ==
=== Development ===
After his directorial debut with Buddies in India, Wang Baoqiang wanted to make another film with a more personal undertaking and spent six years working on Never Say Never. Wang has stated the content of Never Say Never has been at the back of his mind for years before making the film. Wang who came from a peasant background, started learning martial arts when he was six years old and had endured a long series of challenges before obtaining success. Buddies in India had won a Golden Broom Award which was the Chinese equivalent of the Golden Raspberry Awards. As a result, Wang found it difficult in getting investors to fund Never Say Never and had to take out personal loans to fund the film.

The film is based on the MMA gym, Enbo Fight Club which was forced into the spotlight in 2017 after a video of two underage children from the club fighting an MMA bout went viral. The founder, En Bo was a retired paramilitary officer skilled in Sanda who grew up in poverty. In 2001, he established Enbo Fight Club in Chengdu which served as a martial arts school for children from poor rural areas. The film character Su Mu's name comes from UFC fighter Su Mudaerji. In March 2023, En Bo suffered a heart attack and was hospitalized. He was in a coma for many days and had lost 57 pounds. Wang not only helped contact experts to help but also paid for the medical expenses. Wang stated he and En Bo had many similarities such as coming from poor backgrounds and refusing to give up despite difficult circumstances. Although the medical expenses were high and Wang was already in debt, he still chose to save En Bo as he saw a kind of energy in him and hoped Never Say Never could tell the viewers that everyone had this energy within them.

=== Filming ===
The film is shot mainly in Daliang Mountains (which represents the fictional Longshan) and Chengdu which are both in Sichuan province. The young cast members spoke mainly in the Sichuan dialect.

== Release ==
Never Say Never was released in China on 6 July 2023.

== Reception ==
=== Box office ===
Never Say Never on its first weekend took top spot with regards to box office in China. It earned 384 million yuan ($55.3 million) between Friday and Sunday. Within the first six days of its release, Never Say Never grossed over 1 billion yuan ($139 million). It has grossed a total of around 2.2 billion yuan ($304 million) making it one of the highest-grossing films in China in 2023.

=== Critical response ===
On Douban, the film received a user rating of 7.3/10.

At the 18th Changchun Film Festival in 2023, Never Say Never won two awards, best screenplay and the Jury Prize.

== See also ==
- En Bo
- Enbo Fight Club
