= Enbo Fight Club =

Martial arts gym based in Chengdu, China

- Est.: 2001; 25 years ago
- Founded by: En Bo
- Training facilities: Chengdu, Sichuan, China

Enbo Fight Club (Chinese: 恩波格斗; pinyin: Ēnbō Gédòu) is a mixed martial arts (MMA) gym based in Chengdu, Sichuan, China.

== Overview ==
Enbo Fight Club (originally named Aba Prefecture Sanda Club) was founded in 2001 by En Bo, a Chinese MMA coach and former police officer. He stated that during his time in the police, he encountered orphaned children wandering in the mountains or on the streets. As a result, after retiring from the police, he wanted to work on helping orphans. By creating a martial arts gym, they wouldn't need to turn towards crime.

The gym is known to take in orphans and children from impoverished families as there are many regions in the province that have high poverty rates. Due to the gym's location, there are many members of the gym that belong to China's ethnic minority groups such as Tibetans, Hui, Yi and Qiang.

Due to popular demand of many children applying to be members of the gym, there is a screening process for them. They will be checked for contagious diseases and if they are able to perform satisfactory in a three-month trial period.

In 2015, the gym introduced MMA in its offerings and hired MMA coaches.

As of 2017, the gym has over 200 members where children only comprise a small portion of its membership. The gym facilities now encompass almost 4,000 square meters. The gym claims it has 100 professional athletes while some of its others members have gone on to become members of police or armed forces.

In 2017, Vice Media did a documentary on the Enbo Fight Club which featured Tibetan fighter, Banma Duoji who now fights at ONE FC.

In July 2023, a Chinese MMA movie named Never Say Never was released. The setting was based on the Enbo Fight Club.

== Controversies ==
=== MMA fights featuring underaged children ===
In 2017, a video surfaced of two 12-14-year-old boys competing in a commercial MMA bout which gained 12 million views and caused outrage in China. Shortly after the video surfaced, the police in China opened an investigation into the Enbo Fight Club. There was debate on Weibo about the fight and the gym itself. Some argue that the children in the gym were being exploited in hard conditions and dangerous fights which was done solely to earn money for the gym. Others argue that due to circumstances, the children in the gym would have been deprived of a potential future in fighting and would end up on the streets turning to a life of crime. It was noted that one of the fighters in the video said he wished to remain in the gym to pursue his dream of becoming UFC champion. Other young members of the gym shared his sentiments claiming that there was no future in going back to their hometowns.

=== Involvement with the People's Liberation Army ===
It was noted that 20 fighters from the Enbo Fight Club have been enlisted by the People's Liberation Army to form the "Plateau Resistance Tibetan Mastiffs" unit and would be stationed in Lhasa, Tibet. Their role would be helping provide hand-to-hand combat training to soldiers in the area. This happened shortly after the 2020–2021 China–India skirmishes at the Sino-Indian border.

== Notable fighters affiliated ==
- Song Yadong (UFC fighter, peak ranking 2nd in Bantamweight division)
- Su Mudaerji (UFC fighter, peak ranking 11th in Flyweight Division)
- Liu Pingyuan (UFC fighter)
- Rong Zhu (UFC fighter, Road to UFC Season 2 Lightweight tournament winner)
- Maheshate (UFC fighter, first fighter from China to win a UFC contract on Dana White's Contender Series)
- Yi Zha (UFC fighter, Road to UFC Season 2 Featherweight tournament winner)

== See also ==
- List of professional MMA training camps
