= Anderson dos Santos (fighter) =

Brazilian mixed martial arts fighter

- Born: 24 July 1985 (age 41); São Paulo, Brazil
- Other names: Berinja
- Height: 5 ft 5 in (1.65 m)
- Weight: 135 lb (61 kg; 9 st 9 lb)
- Division: Bantamweight; Featherweight
- Reach: 70.0 in (178 cm)
- Stance: Orthodox
- Fighting out of: São Paulo, Brazil
- Team: Babuino Gold Team
- Rank: Black belt in Brazilian Jiu-Jitsu
- Years active: 2011–present

Mixed martial arts record
- Total: 39
- Wins: 25
- By knockout: 5
- By submission: 14
- By decision: 6
- Losses: 14
- By knockout: 7
- By submission: 3
- By decision: 4

Other information
- Mixed martial arts record from Sherdog

Anderson dos Santos (born 24 July 1985) is a Brazilian mixed martial artist who competed in the Bantamweight division of the Ultimate Fighting Championship.

== Mixed martial arts career ==
=== Early career ===
Starting his career in 2011, Anderson compiled a 20–6 record fighting mainly for a large variety of regional Brazilian shows, winning multiple titles. His most notable victory in this time was winning the Titan FC Bantamweight Championship by submitting fellow future UFC fighter Ricky Simón via rear-naked choke in the second round.

=== Ultimate Fighting Championship ===
dos Santos made his UFC debut as a replacement for Enrique Barzola against Nad Narimani on 17 November 2018, at UFC Fight Night: Magny vs. Ponzinibbio. He lost the fight via unanimous decision.

dos Santos faced Andre Ewell on 22 June 2019 at UFC Fight Night: Moicano vs. The Korean Zombie. He lost the fight via unanimous decision.

dos Santos was scheduled to face Jack Shore at UFC on ESPN: Kattar vs. Ige on 16 July 2020. However, dos Santos tested positive for COVID-19 before departing Brazil and was replaced by Aaron Phillips.

dos Santos faced Martin Day on 28 November 2020 at UFC on ESPN: Smith vs. Clark. He won the fight via first round guillotine choke.

dos Santos was scheduled to face Miles Johns on 17 July 2021 at UFC on ESPN 26. However, the bout was removed hours before the show due to COVID-19 protocol issues stemming from Dos Santos' camp. The bout was rescheduled and eventually took place at UFC 265 on 7 August 2021. dos Santos lost the fight via knockout in round three.

On 17 September 2021, it was announced that dos Santos was released by the UFC.

=== Post UFC ===
After two wins on the Brazilian regional scene, dos Santos faced Evgeniy Ignatiev on 26 August 2022 at RCC 12. He lost the bout after getting knocked out in the first round.

dos Santos returned to the Brazilian regional scene, defeating Diego Barroso via arm-triangle choke in the third round at Thunder Fight 41.

After picking a split decision victory on the Brazilian scene, dos Santos returned to Russia and faced Apti Bimarzaev on 2 September 2023 at ACA 162, losing the bout via unanimous decision.

In his sophomore performance with the promotion, dos Santos faced Alimardan Abdykaarov on 24 December 2023 at ACA 168: Gadzhidaudov vs. Tumenov, getting knocked out in the first round.

dos Santos then faced Mikahil Egorov at ACA 174 on 19 April 2024, losing the fight via second round technical knockout.

== Personal life ==
dos Santos and his wife have a daughter, and in 2021 he recently discovered he was a distant relative of current UFC fighter Rafael Dos Santos.

== Championships and accomplishments ==
- Titan Fighting Championships
  - Titan FC Bantamweight Championship (One time)
- Circuito Talent de MMA
  - CT Bantamweight Championship (One time)
- Coliseu Extreme Fight
  - CEF Interim Bantamweight Championship (One time)
- Demolidor Fight MMA
  - DFMMA Featherweight Championship (One time)
- California Cage Wars
  - CCW Bantamweight Championship (One time)

== Mixed martial arts record ==
Professional record breakdown
39 matches	25 wins	14 losses
By knockout	5	7
By submission	14	3
By decision	6	4

Res.	Record	Opponent	Method	Event	Date	Round	Time	Location	Notes
Loss	25–14	Eduardo de Souza Silva	Submission (guillotine choke)	Coliseu Extreme Fight 12	15 November 2025	1	3:12	Arapiraca, Brazil	Catchweight (152 lb) bout.
Loss	25–13	Mikhail Egorov	TKO (knees and punches)	ACA 174	19 April 2024	2	1:12	Saint Petersburg, Russia	
Loss	25–12	Alimardan Abdykaarov	KO (punch)	ACA 168	24 December 2023	1	1:50	Moscow, Russia	Bantamweight bout.
Loss	25–11	Apti Bimarzaev	Decision (unanimous)	ACA 162	2 September 2023	3	5:00	Krasnodar, Russia	
Win	25–10	Patrizio de Souza	Decision (split)	Centurion FC: Non Ducor, Duco	16 June 2023	3	5:00	Morumbi, Brazil	Bantamweight bout.
Win	24–10	Diego Barroso	Submission (arm-triangle choke)	Thunder Fight 41	12 February 2023	3	3:22	São Paulo, Brazil	Catchweight (143 lb) bout.
Loss	23–10	Evgeniy Ignatiev	KO (punch)	RCC 12	26 August 2022	1	4:37	Yekaterinburg, Russia	Return to Featherweight.
Win	23–9	Helio Nunes	Submission (rear-naked choke)	Fight Pro Championship 1	5 March 2022	2	1:29	Bragança Paulista, Brazil	
Win	22–9	Edgar Oliveira	Decision (unanimous)	Demolidor Fight 17	15 January 2022	3	5:00	Bauru, Brazil	
Loss	21–9	Miles Johns	KO (punch)	UFC 265	7 August 2021	3	1:16	Houston, Texas, United States	
Win	21–8	Martin Day	Submission (guillotine choke)	UFC on ESPN: Smith vs. Clark	28 November 2020	1	4:35	Las Vegas, Nevada, United States	
Loss	20–8	Andre Ewell	Decision (unanimous)	UFC Fight Night: Moicano vs. The Korean Zombie	22 June 2019	3	5:00	Greenville, South Carolina, United States	
Loss	20–7	Nad Narimani	Decision (unanimous)	UFC Fight Night: Magny vs. Ponzinibbio	17 November 2018	3	5:00	Buenos Aires, Argentina	Featherweight bout.
Win	20–6	Aleandro Caetano	Decision (unanimous)	Thunder Fight 16	3 November 2018	3	5:00	São Paulo, Brazil	
Win	19–6	Wanderley da Silva Ferreira Jr.	TKO	Standout Fighting Tournament 3	21 July 2018	1	4:10	São Paulo, Brazil	
Win	18–6	Fard Muhammad	Decision (unanimous)	California Cage Wars 5	22 April 2018	5	5:00	Valley Center, California, United States	Won the vacant CCW Bantamweight Championship.
Loss	17–6	Victor Henry	TKO (doctor stoppage)	KOTC: Energetic Pursuit	24 February 2018	2	5:00	Ontario, California, United States	Return to Bantamweight.
Win	17–5	Claudio Aparecido Bertarello	Submission (guillotine choke)	Demolidor Fight MMA 10	12 August 2017	1	2:17	Bauru, Brazil	Won the DFMMA Featherweight Championship.
Loss	16–5	Said Nurmagomedov	Submission (guillotine choke)	WFCA 35	1 April 2017	1	1:52	Astana, Kazakhstan	
Win	16–4	Josema Jose da Paz	Submission (rear-naked choke)	Katana Fight 1	26 November 2016	2	3:58	Curitiba, Brazil	Catchweight (161 lb) bout.
Win	15–4	Thiago dos Santos	Submission (rear-naked choke)	Gold Fight 8	29 October 2016	1	2:11	São Paulo, Brazil	
Loss	14–4	Andrew Whitney	TKO (punches)	Titan FC 40	5 August 2016	2	3:28	Coral Gables, Florida, United States	
Win	14–3	Ricky Simón	Technical Submission (rear-naked choke)	Titan FC 37	4 March 2016	2	2:38	Ridgefield, Washington, United States	Won the vacant Titan FC Bantamweight Championship.
Loss	13–3	Josenaldo Silva	TKO (punches)	Jungle Fight 84	5 December 2015	3	1:40	São Paulo, Brazil	
Win	13–2	Mario Danilo	Submission (rear-naked choke)	Bison Kombat 1	18 July 2015	1	2:48	Taboão da Serra, Brazil	
Loss	12–2	Eduardo de Souza Silva	Submission (guillotine choke)	Coliseu Extreme Fight 12	9 May 2015	1	0:55	Arapiraca, Brazil	For the interim CEF Bantamweight Championship.
Win	12–1	Arivaldo Lima da Silva	Submission (guillotine choke)	Talent MMA Circuit 10	9 August 2014	1	4:40	Osasco, Brazil	
Win	11–1	Michel de Oliveira	Submission (rear-naked choke)	Circuito de Lutas: Fight Night	11 June 2014	1	2:40	São Paulo, Brazil	
Win	10–1	Marcos Vinicius Borges	KO (punch)	Circuito Talent de MMA 6	22 February 2014	1	3:43	Curitiba, Brazil	Won the vacant CT Bantamweight Championship.
Win	9–1	Jose Alexandre	KO (punch)	Talent MMA Circuit 3	28 September 2013	2	1:40	Guarulhos, Brazil	Catchweight (139 lb) bout.
Win	8–1	Ricardo Sattelmayer	Submission (armbar)	X-Fight MMA 6	27 July 2013	1	3:03	Matao, Brazil	
Win	7–1	Leandro Souza Santos	Submission (rear-naked choke)	Bison FC 1	4 July 2013	1	2:59	São Paulo, Brazil	
Win	6–1	Fernando da Silva Lima	Submission (rear-naked choke)	Talent MMA Circuit 1	5 April 2013	2	1:57	Valinhos, Brazil	
Win	5–1	Adilson Dias	Decision (split)	Supreme Fight Championship 1	1 December 2012	3	5:00	Campinas, Brazil	
Win	4–1	Edson Missio	TKO (punches)	Elite Fighting Championship 4	20 October 2012	1	3:10	Valinhos, Brazil	
Loss	3–1	Everaldo Souza	Decision (unanimous)	The Coliseum 1	13 April 2012	3	5:00	São Paulo, Brazil	
Win	3–0	Cemir Silva	Decision (split)	Romani Fight Brasil 1	24 March 2012	3	5:00	São Paulo, Brazil	
Win	2–0	Jorge Andrade	Submission (rear-naked choke)	Morganti Contact Championship 2	3 March 2012	2	3:26	São Paulo, Brazil	
Win	1–0	Ronielmo Lopes	KO (punch)	Fight Stars	14 September 2011	1	3:06	São Paulo, Brazil	

== See also ==
- List of current UFC fighters
- List of male mixed martial artists
