= Martin Day (fighter) =

American mixed martial arts fighter

- Born: Martin Richard Day; November 10, 1988 (age 37); Nagoya, Japan
- Other names: The Spartan
- Nationality: American
- Height: 5 ft 10 in (1.78 m)
- Weight: 135 lb (61 kg; 9 st 9 lb)
- Division: Bantamweight
- Reach: 73.0 in (185 cm)
- Stance: Orthodox
- Fighting out of: Kailua, Honolulu County, Hawaii
- Team: Hawaii Elite MMA
- Years active: 2015–present

Mixed martial arts record
- Total: 15
- Wins: 8
- By knockout: 3
- By submission: 2
- By decision: 3
- Losses: 7
- By knockout: 2
- By submission: 2
- By decision: 3

Other information
- Mixed martial arts record from Sherdog

Martin Richard Day (born November 10, 1988) is a Japanese-born American mixed martial artist who competes in the Bantamweight division. He formerly competed in the Ultimate Fighting Championship.

== Background ==
The son of missionaries, Martin was born in Nagoya, Japan while his parents were stationed there and his family moved to Hawaii when he was 9 months old. He has eight other siblings. He started training in Taekwondo when he was 13 and started competing around the same time. After starting boxing around the age of 15 and accumulated quite a bit of amateur kickboxing fights, he decided to try MMA. Currently, Day is a 5th degree Dan Black Belt in ITF Taekwondo.

== Martial arts career ==
He used to work at martial arts company and now he runs prime martial arts. He started training in February 2002 and started teaching in October 2002. He was taught by KukSahNim Samuel K. Bishaw Jr.

== Mixed martial arts career ==
=== Early career ===
Starting his career in 2015, Day earned an impressive record of 6–1, before he was invited on Dana White's Contender Series. Day's lone loss in the road prior to DWTNCS came in March 2017 when he suffered defeat to Bellator MMA and LFA veteran Nohelin Hernandez.

Day's first shot under the ZUFFA lights came against Jaime Alvarez on Dana White's Contender Series 6 in August 2017. Day came out early with very solid leg kicks but was unable to get the judges’ decision at the end of the bout.

After the defeat, Day continued to win on the Hawaiian and California regional scenes. Day won all three of his following bouts, two of them by finishes. The final of the three was against the undefeated Brady Huang. Huang was 8-0 going into the matchup with all eight bouts ending by finish and seven of those eight ending in the first round. The two battled URCC 34: Destiny in August 2018 as the co-main event to former UFC veteran Tyson Griffin. Day made quick work of the undefeated star, knocking out Huang in the second round.

=== Ultimate Fighting Championship ===
Day made his UFC debut on November 24, 2018, at UFC Fight Night: Blaydes vs. Ngannou 2 against Liu Pingyuan. He lost the fight via split decision.

Martin Day faced Davey Grant on July 11, 2020, at UFC 251. He lost the fight via knockout in the third round.

Day fought Anderson dos Santos on November 28, 2020, at UFC on ESPN: Smith vs. Clark. He lost the fight via first round guillotine choke.

Day faced Timur Valiev on February 6, 2021, at UFC Fight Night: Overeem vs. Volkov. He lost the fight via unanimous decision.

On February 18, 2021, it was announced that Day had been released from the UFC.

=== Post UFC ===
In his first appearance after leaving the UFC, Day faced Ramon Taveras on April 30, 2022 at Combat Night Pro:Jacksonville. He lost the bout via guillotine choke in the first round.

== Championships and accomplishments ==
- Universal Reality Combat Championship
  - URCC Bantamweight Championship (One time)

== Mixed martial arts record ==
Professional record breakdown
15 matches	8 wins	7 losses
By knockout	3	2
By submission	2	2
By decision	3	3

Res.	Record	Opponent	Method	Event	Date	Round	Time	Location	Notes
Loss	8–7	Ramon Taveras	Submission (guillotine choke)	Combat Night Pro: Jacksonville	April 30, 2022	1	2:40	Jacksonville, Florida, United States	Catchweight (140 lb) bout.
Loss	8–6	Timur Valiev	Decision (unanimous)	UFC Fight Night: Overeem vs. Volkov	February 6, 2021	3	5:00	Las Vegas, Nevada, United States	Featherweight debut.
Loss	8–5	Anderson dos Santos	Submission (guillotine choke)	UFC on ESPN: Smith vs. Clark	November 28, 2020	1	4:35	Las Vegas, Nevada, United States	
Loss	8–4	Davey Grant	KO (punch)	UFC 251	July 12, 2020	3	2:38	Abu Dhabi, United Arab Emirates	
Loss	8–3	Liu Pingyuan	Decision (split)	UFC Fight Night: Blaydes vs. Ngannou 2	November 24, 2018	3	5:00	Beijing, China	
Win	8–2	Brady Huang	TKO	URCC 34	August 4, 2018	2	1:10	Richmond, California, United States	Return to Bantamweight. Won the vacant URCC Bantamweight Championship.
Win	7–2	Shojin Miki	Decision (unanimous)	Destiny MMA: Fight Night 5	June 23, 2018	3	5:00	Honolulu, Hawaii, United States	
Win	6–2	Richard Barnard	Submission (guillotine choke)	Destiny MMA: Fight Night 4	February 17, 2018	1	0:55	Honolulu, Hawaii, United States	
Loss	5–2	Jaime Alvarez	Decision (split)	Dana White's Contender Series 6	August 15, 2017	3	5:00	Las Vegas, Nevada, United States	
Win	5–1	Shojin Miki	KO (punches)	Mid-Pacific Championships 3	June 9, 2017	1	4:31	Honolulu, Hawaii, United States	Flyweight debut.
Loss	4–1	Nohelin Hernandez	TKO (punches)	Global Knockout 9	March 18, 2017	2	N/A	Jackson, California, United States	
Win	4–0	Richard Parra III	Decision (split)	Tachi Palace Fights 28	August 4, 2016	3	5:00	Lemoore, California, United States	
Win	3–0	Anthony Torres	TKO (punches)	WFC 17	May 7, 2016	1	1:55	Sacramento, California, United States	
Win	2–0	Jeffery Oher	TKO (punches)	Destiny MMA: Trinity Sport Combat	October 30, 2015	2	2:50	Kapolei, Hawaii, United States	Bantamweight debut.
Win	1–0	Dylan Morgan	Decision (split)	Destiny MMA: Na Koa 8	January 17, 2015	3	5:00	Honolulu, Hawaii, United States	Catchweight (140 lb) bout.

== See also ==
- List of male mixed martial artists
