= UFC Fight Night: Blaydes vs. Ngannou 2 =

UFC mixed martial arts event in 2018

- The poster for UFC Fight Night: Blaydes vs. Ngannou 2
- Promotion: Ultimate Fighting Championship
- Date: November 24, 2018
- Venue: Cadillac Arena
- City: Beijing, China
- Attendance: 10,302

Event chronology
UFC Fight Night: Magny vs. Ponzinibbio	UFC Fight Night: Blaydes vs. Ngannou 2	The Ultimate Fighter: Heavy Hitters Finale

UFC Fight Night: Blaydes vs. Ngannou 2 (also known as UFC Fight Night 141) was a mixed martial arts event produced by the Ultimate Fighting Championship that was held on November 24, 2018 at Cadillac Arena in Beijing, China.

== Background ==
The event marked the promotion's first visit to Beijing. The UFC previously visited Mainland China for UFC Fight Night: Bisping vs. Gastelum in November 2017.

A heavyweight rematch between former UFC Heavyweight Championship challenger Francis Ngannou and Curtis Blaydes served as the event headliner. The pairing met previously in April 2016 at UFC Fight Night: Rothwell vs. dos Santos, with Ngannou winning the fight via TKO stoppage at the conclusion of the second round.

Shana Dobson was scheduled to face Wu Yanan at the event. However, Dobson pulled out of the fight in mid-October citing an injury and was replaced by Lauren Mueller.

Elizeu Zaleski dos Santos was expected to face Li Jingliang at the event. However, Santos pulled out from the bout on October 27 due to a knee injury. He was replaced by David Zawada.

Frankie Saenz was expected to face Song Yadong at the event. However, on November 7, it was reported that he pulled out of the bout due to injury and was replaced by promotional newcomer Vince Morales.

At the weigh-ins, Rashad Coulter weighed in at 208 pounds, 2 pounds over the light heavyweight non-title fight limit of 206. Coulter was fined 20 percent of his purse, which went to his opponent Hu Yaozong.

== Results ==
Main Card (UFC Fight Pass)
Weight class				Method	Round	Time	Notes
Heavyweight	Francis Ngannou	def.	Curtis Blaydes	TKO (punches)	1	0:45
Heavyweight	Alistair Overeem	def.	Sergei Pavlovich	TKO (punches)	1	4:21
Bantamweight	Song Yadong	def.	Vince Morales	Decision (unanimous) (30–27, 30–27, 30–27)	3	5:00
Welterweight	Li Jingliang	def.	David Zawada	TKO (body kick and punches)	3	4:07
Early Preliminary Card (UFC Fight Pass)
Welterweight	Alex Morono	def.	Song Kenan	Decision (unanimous) (30–27, 30–27, 30–27)	3	5:00
Women's Flyweight	Wu Yanan	def.	Lauren Mueller	Submission (armbar)	1	4:00
Catchweight (208 lb)	Rashad Coulter	def.	Hu Yaozong	Decision (unanimous) (29–28, 29–28, 30–27)	3	5:00
Women's Strawweight	Zhang Weili	def.	Jessica Aguilar	Submission (armbar)	1	3:41
Bantamweight	Liu Pingyuan	def.	Martin Day	Decision (split) (29–28, 28–29, 29–28)	3	5:00
Women's Strawweight	Yan Xiaonan	def.	Syuri Kondo	Decision (unanimous) (30–27, 30–27, 30–27)	3	5:00
Middleweight	Kevin Holland	def.	John Phillips	Submission (rear-naked choke)	3	4:05
Bantamweight	Louis Smolka	def.	Su Mudaerji	Submission (armbar)	2	2:07

== Bonus awards ==
The following fighters received $50,000 bonuses:

- Fight of the Night: Alex Morono vs. Kenan Song
- Performances of the Night: Francis Ngannou and Li Jingliang

== See also ==
- List of UFC events
- 2018 in UFC
- List of current UFC fighters
