= Davey Grant =

English mixed martial artist

- Born: 18 December 1985 (age 40); Darlington, County Durham, England
- Other names: Dangerous
- Height: 5 ft 8 in (173 cm)
- Weight: 135 lb (61 kg; 9 st 9 lb)
- Division: Bantamweight
- Reach: 69 in (175 cm)
- Fighting out of: Bishop Auckland, County Durham, England
- Team: SBG UK
- Rank: Black belt in Brazilian Jiu-Jitsu; Black belt in Kickboxing
- Years active: 2008–present

Mixed martial arts record
- Total: 27
- Wins: 18
- By knockout: 4
- By submission: 9
- By decision: 5
- Losses: 9
- By knockout: 1
- By submission: 5
- By decision: 3

Other information
- Mixed martial arts record from Sherdog

Davey Grant (born 18 December 1985) is an English mixed martial artist. He was one of the cast members for UFC TV series The Ultimate Fighter: Team Rousey vs. Team Tate and currently competes in the Bantamweight division of the Ultimate Fighting Championship (UFC).

== Background ==
Grant started kickboxing training when he was 14 and picked up grappling on later date where he had his first amateur fight at the age of 15. Along with training MMA, Grant also played football and rugby during his teenage years. He decided to take it seriously when he was 21 where he decided to be a professional fighter after he won a fight just to prove to his friends he had trained in MMA.

I was watching a fight with my mates and I told them I used to do it. Nobody believed me because I’m not the kind of person that gets into fights, I just like to get along with people and have a laugh.

== Mixed martial arts career ==
=== Early career ===
Grant fought all of his fights primarily in the England circuit and amassed of a record of 9–1 prior to being signed by the UFC.

=== The Ultimate Fighter 18 ===
Grant was selected as one of the cast members for The Ultimate Fighter: Team Rousey vs. Team Tate, under Team Ronda Rousey in September 2013.

In the preliminary bout preceding the tournament, Grant faced Danny Martinez whom he defeated via second-round submission. In the elimination round, Grant submitted Louis Fisette in the second round. Grant was next scheduled to face Anthony Gutierrez. However, Gutierrez did not make weight and was expelled from the show and Grant advanced to the Final facing Chris Holdsworth in The Ultimate Fighter 18 Finale.

=== Ultimate Fighting Championship ===
Grant made his UFC debut on 30 November 2013 at The Ultimate Fighter 18 Finale in Las Vegas, United States against Chris Holdsworth to crown the bantamweight winner of The Ultimate Fighter 18. He lost by rear-naked choke in round two.

Grant was expected to face Roland Delorme at UFC Fight Night: Gustafsson vs. Manuwa and it was cancelled after the weigh ins the day before the event due to Grant suffering a torn meniscus. He voiced his disappointment for not being able to make the fight in front of his home crowd in an interview:

I am devastated not to be fighting tonight, I was so looking forward to putting on a great show in front of the fans in the O2, but I will be at the arena to show my support to all the British fighters on the card.

After a 25-month hiatus from competing, after his UFC debut, due to separate injuries to his knees, ankle and back, on 27 February 2016, Grant took up Marlon Vera at UFC Fight Night: Silva vs. Bisping. He won the fight via unanimous decision with a score of 30–26, across the board.

On 8 October 2016 Grant faced Damian Stasiak at UFC 204. He was submitted via an armbar and lost the fight. Grant and Stasiak felt the cracked of Grant's arm twice during the submission, and Grant said in his post-fight interview:

I think my arm might possible be broken. I felt it cracking when I was in the armbar but I just didn’t want to tap, it meant too much.

After an 18-month hiatus, Grant was scheduled to meet Manny Bermudez on 27 May 2018 at UFC Fight Night 130. However, Grant pulled out of the fight after being diagnosed with a staph infection, and the bout was scrapped. The pairing was left intact and took place on 22 July 2018 at UFC Fight Night 134. After being knocked down early, he lost the fight via a triangle choke.

Grant faced Grigory Popov on 9 November 2019 at UFC on ESPN+ 21. He won the fight via a split decision.

Grant was expected to face Louis Smolka on 28 March 2020 at UFC on ESPN: Ngannou vs. Rozenstruik. Due to the COVID-19 pandemic, the event was eventually postponed.

Grant faced Martin Day on 11 July 2020 at UFC 251. He won the fight via knockout in the third round. This win earned him the Performance of the Night award.

Grant faced Jonathan Martinez on 13 March 2021 at UFC Fight Night 187. He won the fight via knockout in round two. This win earned him the Performance of the Night award.

A rematch with Marlon Vera took place on 19 June 2021 at UFC on ESPN 25. He lost the bout via unanimous decision. The bout earned both fighters the Fight of the Night award.

Grant faced Adrian Yañez on 20 November 2021 at UFC Fight Night 198. He lost the bout via split decision. 12 out of 12 media scores gave it to Yañez. The bout earned both fighters the Fight of the Night award.

Grant faced Louis Smolka on 14 May 2022 at UFC on ESPN 36. After knocking Smolka down multiple times via punches and leg kicks, Grant won the bout via KO in round three.

Grant faced Raphael Assunção, replacing Kyler Phillips, on 11 March 2023 at UFC Fight Night 221. He won the fight via a reverse triangle choke technical submission in the third round. This win earned him the Performance of the Night award.

Grant faced Daniel Marcos on 22 July 2023 at UFC on ESPN+ 82. He lost the fight in a controversial, split decision as many thought Grant had won the fight. 12 of 14 media outlets scored the contest for Grant.

Grant was scheduled to face Cody Gibson on 23 March 2024 at UFC on ESPN 53. However, Grant withdrew due to injury and was replaced by Miles Johns.

Grant faced Ramon Taveras on 14 December 2024 at UFC on ESPN 63. He won the fight by unanimous decision.

Grant was scheduled to face Daniel Santos on 5 April 2025 at UFC on ESPN 65. However, Santos failed to make an appearance at the weigh-ins and the bout was cancelled due to medical issues on Santos' part.

Grant faced Da'Mon Blackshear on 9 July 2025, at UFC on ABC 9. He won the fight by unanimous decision.

Grant faced Charles Jourdain on 18 October 2025, at UFC Fight Night 262. He lost the fight via a guillotine choke in round one.

Grant faced promotional newcomer Adrián Luna Martinetti on 25 April 2026 at UFC Fight Night 274. He won the fight via unanimous decision. The bout earned both fighters the Fight of the Night award.

Grant faced Elijah Smith on 7 November 2026 at UFC Fight Night 293. He lost the fight by knockout one minute into the first round.

== Personal life ==
Grant and his wife Sherrie have two sons and a daughter. He and his family previously lived in England but they now reside in Las Vegas, Nevada, he also runs a MMA gym in Bishop Auckland.

== Championships and accomplishments ==
=== Mixed martial arts ===
- Ultimate Fighting Championship
  - Fight of the Night (Three times) vs. Marlon Vera, Adrian Yañez and Adrián Luna Martinetti
  - Performance of the Night (Three times) vs. Martin Day, Jonathan Martinez, and Raphael Assunção
    - Tied (Rob Font, Marlon Vera & Song Yadong) for fourth most Post-Fight bonuses in UFC Bantamweight division history (6)
  - UFC Honors Awards
    - 2023: Fan's Choice Submission of the Year Nominee vs. Raphael Assunção
- Violent Money TV
  - VMTV UK MMA Submission of the Year 2023

== Mixed martial arts record ==
Professional record breakdown
27 matches	18 wins	9 losses
By knockout	4	1
By submission	9	5
By decision	5	3

Res.	Record	Opponent	Method	Event	Date	Round	Time	Location	Notes
Loss	18–9	Elijah Smith	KO (punches)	UFC Fight Night: Cortes-Acosta vs. Walker	7 November 2026	1	1:00	Las Vegas, Nevada, United States	
Win	18–8	Adrián Luna Martinetti	Decision (unanimous)	UFC Fight Night: Sterling vs. Zalal	25 April 2026	3	5:00	Las Vegas, Nevada, United States	Fight of the Night.
Loss	17–8	Charles Jourdain	Submission (guillotine choke)	UFC Fight Night: de Ridder vs. Allen	18 October 2025	1	3:05	Vancouver, British Columbia, Canada	
Win	17–7	Da'Mon Blackshear	Decision (unanimous)	UFC on ABC: Whittaker vs. de Ridder	26 July 2025	3	5:00	Abu Dhabi, United Arab Emirates	
Win	16–7	Ramon Taveras	Decision (unanimous)	UFC on ESPN: Covington vs. Buckley	14 December 2024	3	5:00	Tampa, Florida, United States	
Loss	15–7	Daniel Marcos	Decision (split)	UFC Fight Night: Aspinall vs. Tybura	22 July 2023	3	5:00	London, England	
Win	15–6	Raphael Assunção	Technical Submission (inverted triangle choke)	UFC Fight Night: Yan vs. Dvalishvili	11 March 2023	3	4:43	Las Vegas, Nevada, United States	Grant was deducted one point in round 3 due to grabbing the fence. Performance of the Night.
Win	14–6	Louis Smolka	KO (punches)	UFC on ESPN: Błachowicz vs. Rakić	14 May 2022	3	0:49	Las Vegas, Nevada, United States	
Loss	13–6	Adrian Yañez	Decision (split)	UFC Fight Night: Vieira vs. Tate	20 November 2021	3	5:00	Las Vegas, Nevada, United States	Fight of the Night.
Loss	13–5	Marlon Vera	Decision (unanimous)	UFC on ESPN: The Korean Zombie vs. Ige	19 June 2021	3	5:00	Las Vegas, Nevada, United States	Fight of the Night.
Win	13–4	Jonathan Martinez	KO (punch)	UFC Fight Night: Edwards vs. Muhammad	13 March 2021	2	3:03	Las Vegas, Nevada, United States	Performance of the Night.
Win	12–4	Martin Day	KO (punch)	UFC 251	12 July 2020	3	2:38	Abu Dhabi, United Arab Emirates	Performance of the Night.
Win	11–4	Grigorii Popov	Decision (split)	UFC Fight Night: Magomedsharipov vs. Kattar	9 November 2019	3	5:00	Moscow, Russia	
Loss	10–4	Manny Bermudez	Technical Submission (triangle choke)	UFC Fight Night: Shogun vs. Smith	22 July 2018	1	0:59	Hamburg, Germany	
Loss	10–3	Damian Stasiak	Submission (armbar)	UFC 204	8 October 2016	3	3:56	Manchester, England	
Win	10–2	Marlon Vera	Decision (unanimous)	UFC Fight Night: Silva vs. Bisping	27 February 2016	3	5:00	London, England	Vera was deducted one point in round 3 due to grabbing the inside of Grant's glove.
Loss	9–2	Chris Holdsworth	Submission (rear-naked choke)	The Ultimate Fighter: Team Rousey vs. Team Tate Finale	30 November 2013	2	2:10	Las Vegas, Nevada, United States	The Ultimate Fighter 18 Bantamweight Tournament Final.
Win	9–1	Danny Welsh	Submission (rear-naked choke)	Made 4 the Cage 7	13 October 2012	1	1:54	Sunderland, England	
Win	8–1	James Pennington	Submission (guillotine choke)	Shock n' Awe 11	14 July 2012	1	3:59	Portsmouth, England	Won the SNA Bantamweight Championship.
Win	7–1	Rob Bunford	TKO (punches)	Total Combat 46	10 March 2012	1	1:01	Spennymoor, England	
Win	6–1	Luke Dixon	Submission (rear-naked choke)	Total Combat 44	19 November 2011	1	2:11	Sunderland, England	
Win	5–1	Mark Aldrige	Submission (rear-naked choke)	Total Combat 41	16 July 2011	1	1:12	Sunderland, England	
Win	4–1	Declan Williams	Submission (rear-naked choke)	Total Combat 39	12 March 2011	2	1:13	Spennymoor, England	
Win	3–1	Mark Platts	Submission (guillotine choke)	Total Combat 37	13 November 2010	2	2:27	Sunderland, England	
Win	2–1	Nathan Thompson	Submission (guillotine choke)	Total Combat 37	13 November 2010	1	1:17	Sunderland, England	
Loss	1–1	Dale Dargan	Submission (armbar)	Total Combat 30	18 July 2009	1	3:53	Sunderland, England	
Win	1–0	Gary Conlon	Submission (triangle choke)	Total Combat 27	29 November 2008	1	1:00	Houghton le Spring, England	Bantamweight debut.

== See also ==
- List of current UFC fighters
- List of male mixed martial artists
