= Nad Narimani =

English mixed martial artist

- Born: 14 April 1987 (age 39); Bristol, England
- Other names: Smiler; 1SA (One Step Ahead)
- Height: 5 ft 8 in (173 cm)
- Weight: 145 lb (66 kg; 10 st 5 lb)
- Division: Featherweight
- Reach: 70 in (178 cm)
- Fighting out of: Bristol, England
- Team: Team Alpha Male
- Rank: Black belt in Brazilian jiu-jitsu under Pedro Bessa
- Years active: 2011–present

Mixed martial arts record
- Total: 16
- Wins: 12
- By knockout: 2
- By submission: 5
- By decision: 5
- Losses: 4
- By knockout: 1
- By decision: 3

Other information
- Mixed martial arts record from Sherdog

Nad Narimani (born 14 April 1987) is an English mixed martial artist. He was the former Cage Warriors Fighting Championship featherweight champion and he competed in the Featherweight division of the Ultimate Fighting Championship.

== Mixed martial arts career ==
=== Early career ===
Narimani started his professional mma career in 2011 and he won the Cage Warriors Fighting Championship featherweight championship against Paddy Pimblett in April 2017 with a record of 10-2 period he signed with the UFC.

=== Ultimate Fighting Championship ===
Narimani was scheduled to make his UFC debut on a short notice on 17 March 2018 at UFC Fight Night: Werdum vs. Volkov against Nasrat Haqparast, replacing injured Alex Reyes. The bout was scrapped on the day of the event as Haqparast was deemed unfit to fight by the medical team due to an infectious eye condition.

Narimani's UFC debut was rescheduled on 22 July 2018 against Khalid Taha at UFC Fight Night: Shogun vs. Smith. He won the fight via unanimous decision.

Narimani was scheduled to face Enrique Barzola on 17 November 2018 at UFC Fight Night: Magny vs. Ponzinibbio. However, Barzola was pulled from the event and he was replaced by Anderson dos Santos. He won the fight via unanimous decision.

Narimani next faced Mike Grundy on 16 March 2019 at UFC Fight Night: Till vs. Masvidal. Narimani lost the fight via TKO in the second round.

Narimani was scheduled to face Nik Lentz at UFC Fight Night: Blaydes vs. dos Santos on 25 January 2020. However, Narimani pulled out of the fight citing injury and was replaced by Arnold Allen.

Narimani faced Grant Dawson on 19 July 2020 at UFC Fight Night: Figueiredo vs. Benavidez 2. He lost the fight via unanimous decision. He was subsequently released by the UFC.

== Personal life ==
Narimani is married with two children and is of Iranian heritage. He spent time helping in his father's Middle-Eastern restaurants in his spare time before turning to be a professional MMA fighter.

== Championships and accomplishments ==
=== Mixed martial arts ===
- Cage Warriors Fighting Championship
  - Cage Warriors Fighting Championship Featherweight Champion (One time) vs. Paddy Pimblett

== Mixed martial arts record ==
Professional record breakdown
16 matches	12 wins	4 losses
By knockout	2	1
By submission	5	0
By decision	5	3

Res.	Record	Opponent	Method	Event	Date	Round	Time	Location	Notes
Loss	12–4	Grant Dawson	Decision (unanimous)	UFC Fight Night: Figueiredo vs. Benavidez 2	19 July 2020	3	5:00	Abu Dhabi, United Arab Emirates	Catchweight (150 lb) bout.
Loss	12–3	Mike Grundy	TKO (punches)	UFC Fight Night: Till vs. Masvidal	16 March 2019	2	4:42	London, England	
Win	12–2	Anderson dos Santos	Decision (unanimous)	UFC Fight Night: Magny vs. Ponzinibbio	17 November 2018	3	5:00	Buenos Aires, Argentina	
Win	11–2	Khalid Taha	Decision (unanimous)	UFC Fight Night: Shogun vs. Smith	22 July 2018	3	5:00	Hamburg, Germany	
Win	10–2	Paddy Pimblett	Decision (unanimous)	Cage Warriors 82	1 April 2017	5	5:00	Liverpool, England	Won the Cage Warriors Featherweight Championship.
Win	9–2	Daniel Requeijo	Submission (guillotine choke)	Cage Warriors 76	4 June 2016	3	1:21	Newport, Wales	
Win	8–2	Jeremy Petley	TKO (punches)	BAMMA 23	4 November 2015	1	2:26	Birmingham, England	
Loss	7–2	Alex Enlund	Decision (unanimous)	Cage Warriors 73	1 November 2014	5	5:00	Newcastle, England	For the vacant Cage Warriors Featherweight Championship.
Win	7–1	Benjamin Brander	Submission (rear-naked choke)	Cage Warriors 64	15 February 2014	1	4:53	London, England	
Win	6–1	Athinodoros Michailidis	Submission (rear-naked choke)	Cage Warriors 60	5 October 2013	1	3:42	London, England	
Loss	5–1	Graham Turner	Decision (split)	Cage Warriors 56	6 July 2013	3	5:00	London, England	
Win	5–0	Karsten Lenjoint	Decision (unanimous)	Fight UK 9	20 April 2013	3	5:00	Leicester, England	
Win	4–0	Marcin Wrzosek	Decision (split)	Fight UK 8	17 November 2012	3	5:00	Leicester, England	
Win	3–0	Maksym Matus	Submission (triangle choke)	Cage Conflict 14	28 August 2012	1	0:53	Manchester, England	
Win	2–0	Alex Brunnen	Submission (rear-naked choke)	Tear Up 7	19 November 2011	2	4;28	Bristol, England	
Win	1–0	Harvey Dines	TKO (corner stoppage)	KnuckleUp MMA: The New Breed 7	16 July 2011	2	4:42	Somerset, England	Featherweight debut.

== See also ==
- List of male mixed martial artists
