= Warrior Xtreme Cagefighting =

MMA promoter based in Detroit, Michigan

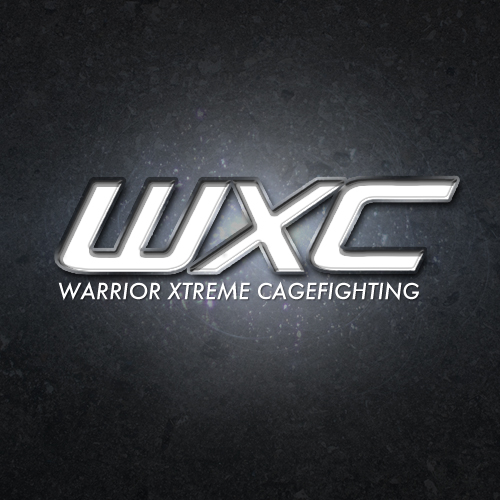
- Company type: Private
- Industry: Mixed martial arts promotion
- Founder: Norbert Pasztor
- Headquarters: Detroit, Michigan, United States
- Parent: Warrior Xtreme Cagefighting, LLC

The Warrior Xtreme Cagefighting (WXC) is a Michigan-based mixed martial arts promotion and is one of the smallest promotions in the world. Based in the United States, the WXC has eight weight divisions and enforces the Unified Rules of Mixed Martial Arts. Norbert Pasztor serves as the president of the WXC.

Inspired by UFC, the first WXC event was held in 2008 in Monroe, Michigan. Showcasing fighters of different disciplines — including Boxing, Brazilian Jiu-Jitsu, Tae Kwon Do, Wrestling, Muay Thai, Karate and other styles — the WXC sought to provide authentic and most effective martial art in a real fight.

== Rules ==
The current rules for the Warrior Xtreme Cagefighting are the rules established by the New Jersey Athletic Control Board. The "Unified Rules of Mixed Martial Arts" that New Jersey established has been adopted in other states that regulate mixed martial arts, including Nevada, Louisiana, and California. These rules are also used by many other promotions within the United States, becoming mandatory for those states that have adopted the rules, and so have become the standard de facto set of rules for professional mixed martial arts across the country.

=== Rounds ===
WXC matches vary in maximum length, depending on whether the match is for a Championship title, or is a fight card's "main event" fight. In all fights, each round can be no longer than five minutes. Championship fights last for a maximum of five rounds. Non-championship "main event" fights (i.e. the final fight on the card), will also last for a maximum of five rounds. Bouts which re either on the preliminary card, or on the main card prior to the main event, last for a maximum of three rounds. There is a one-minute rest period between rounds.

=== Weight divisions ===
The WXC currently uses eight weight classes:

Weight class name	Upper limit	
Weight class name	in pounds (lb)	in kilograms (kg)
Flyweight	125	56.7
Bantamweight	135	61.2
Featherweight	145	65.8
Lightweight	155	70.3
Welterweight	170	77.1
Middleweight	185	83.9
Light Heavyweight	205	93.0
Heavyweight	265	120.2

- Super Heavyweight: 265+ (no weight limits)

=== Cage ===
The WXC stages bouts in a six-sided enclosure officially named "The Hexagon".

The WXC cage is a hexagon structure with walls of metal chain-link fence coated with black vinyl and a diameter of 24 ft (7.3 m), allowing 24 ft (7.3 m) of space from side to side. The fence is 5 ft 6 in to 5 ft 8 in high. The cage sits atop a platform, raising it from the ground. It has foam padding around the top of the fence and between each of the six sections. It also has two entry-exit gates opposite each other. The mat, painted with sponsorship logos and art, is replaced for each event.

=== Attire ===
All competitors must fight in approved shorts, without shoes. Shirts, gis or long pants (including gi pants) are not allowed. Fighters must use approved light-weight open-fingered gloves, that include at least 1" of padding around the knuckles, (110 to 170 g / 4 to 6 ounces) that allow fingers to grab. These gloves enable fighters to punch with less risk of an injured or broken hand, while retaining the ability to grab and grapple. A mouthguard and jockstrap with protective cup are also required and is checked by a State Athletic Committee official before being allowed to enter the cage/ring.

=== Match outcome ===
- Submission: a fighter clearly taps the mat or his opponent, or verbally submits. Also a technical submission may be called when a fighter either loses consciousness or is on the verge of serious injury while in a hold.
- Knockout: a fighter is put into a state of unconsciousness resulting from any legal strike.
- Technical Knockout (TKO): If the referee decides a fighter cannot continue, the fight is ruled as a technical knockout. Technical knockouts can be classified into three categories:
  - referee stoppage (the referee ends the fight because one fighter is unable to intelligently defend himself)
  - doctor stoppage (a ring side doctor decides that it is unsafe for the fighter to continue the bout due to excessive bleeding or physical injuries)
  - corner stoppage (a fighter's cornerman signals defeat for their own fighter)
- Judges' Decision: Depending on scoring, a match may end as:
  - unanimous decision (all three judges score a win for fighter A)
  - majority decision (two judges score a win for fighter A, one judge scores a draw)
  - split decision (two judges score a win for fighter A, one judge scores a win for fighter B)
  - unanimous draw (all three judges score a draw)
  - majority draw (two judges score a draw, one judge scoring a win)
  - split draw (one judge scores a win for fighter A, one judge scores a win for fighter B, and one judge scores a draw)

Note: In the event of a draw, it is not necessary that the fighters' total points be equal. However, in a unanimous or split draw, each fighter does score an equal number of win judgments from the three judges (0 or 1, respectively).

A fight can also end in a technical decision, technical submission, disqualification, forfeit, technical draw, or no contest. The latter two outcomes have no winners.

=== Judging criteria ===
The ten-point must system is in effect for all WXC fights; three judges score each round and the winner of each receives ten points, the loser nine points or fewer. Scores of 10–8 are typically awarded for very dominant rounds.

=== Fouls ===
1. Butting with the head
2. Eye gouging of any kind
3. Biting
4. Hair pulling
5. Fish hooking
6. Groin attacks of any kind
7. Putting a finger into any orifice or into any cut or laceration on an opponent (see Fish-hooking)
8. Small joint manipulation
9. Striking to the spine or the back of the head (see Rabbit punch)
10. Striking downward using the point of the elbow (see Elbow (strike))
11. Throat strikes of any kind, including, without limitation, grabbing the trachea
12. Clawing, pinching or twisting the flesh
13. Grabbing the clavicle
14. Kicking the head of a grounded opponent
15. Kneeing the head of a grounded opponent
16. Stomping a grounded opponent
17. Kicking to the kidney with the heel
18. Spiking an opponent to the canvas on his head or neck (see Piledriver)
19. Throwing an opponent out of the ring or fenced area
20. Holding the shorts or gloves of an opponent
21. Spitting at an opponent
22. Engaging in unsportsmanlike conduct that causes an injury to an opponent
23. Holding the ropes or the fence
24. Using abusive language in the ring or fenced area
25. Attacking an opponent on or during the break
26. Attacking an opponent who is under the care of the referee
27. Attacking an opponent after the bell (horn) has sounded the end of a round
28. Flagrantly disregarding the instructions of the referee
29. Timidity, including, without limitation, avoiding contact with an opponent, intentionally or consistently dropping the mouthpiece or faking an injury
30. Interference by the corner
31. Throwing in the towel during competition

When a foul is charged, the referee in their discretion may deduct one or more points as a penalty. If a foul incapacitates a fighter, then the match may end in a disqualification if the foul was intentional, or a no contest if unintentional. If a foul causes a fighter to be unable to continue later in the bout, it ends with a technical decision win to the injured fighter if the injured fighter is ahead on points, otherwise it is a technical draw.

=== Match conduct ===
- After a verbal warning the referee can stop the fighters and stand them up if they reach a stalemate on the ground (where neither are in a dominant position or working towards one). This rule is codified in Nevada as the stand-up rule.
- If the referee pauses the match, it is resumed with the fighters in their prior positions.
- Grabbing the cage brings a verbal warning, followed by an attempt by the referee to release the grab by pulling on the grabbing hand. If that attempt fails or if the fighter continues to hold the cage, the referee may charge a foul.
- Early WXC events disregarded verbal sparring / "trash-talking" during matches. Under unified rules, antics are permitted before events to add to excitement and allow fighters to express themselves, but abusive language during combat is prohibited.

=== Fighter salaries ===
A WXC fighter generally does not have a salary, Amateur fighters do not get paid. Professional fighters are paid per fight, with amounts depending on how well-known the fighters are and how well sponsored a fighter and an event is. Fighters will typically get paid money to fight with an additional bonus if they win. Cash bonuses are also typically awarded for "Fight of the Night", "Knockout of the Night", and "Submission of the Night." The size of these bonuses varies by event, but, for less well-known fighters, they can be several times larger than the contracted amount for the fight.

== Media ==
=== Music ===
- WXC: Xtreme Beat Downs, Vol. 1, an album of music featured in and inspired by the WXC.

=== DVD ===
- Every pay-per-view WXC event has been released onto DVD.
