= Liu Pingyuan =

Chinese mixed martial artist (born 1993)

- Born: February 13, 1993 (age 33); Zhengzhou, Henan, China
- Height: 5 ft 6 in (1.68 m)
- Weight: 135 lb (61 kg; 9 st 9 lb)
- Division: Bantamweight
- Reach: 70 in (178 cm)
- Fighting out of: Zhengzhou, Henan, China
- Team: Enbo Fight Club; Team Alpha Male
- Years active: 2010–2019

Mixed martial arts record
- Total: 21
- Wins: 15
- By knockout: 4
- By submission: 6
- By decision: 5
- Losses: 6
- By knockout: 3
- By submission: 1
- By decision: 2

Other information
- Mixed martial arts record from Sherdog

Liu Pingyuan (born February 13, 1993) is a Chinese mixed martial artist (MMA), who competed in the bantamweight division in the Ultimate Fighting Championship (UFC).

== Mixed martial arts career ==
=== Early career ===
Liu started his professional MMA career since 2010. He fought primary in China and Mongolia and amassed a record of 11-5 prior signed by UFC.

=== Ultimate Fighting Championship ===
Liu made his UFC debut on July 22, 2018 on UFC Fight Night: Shogun vs. Smith against Damian Stasiak. He won the fight via unanimous decision.

His next fight came on November 24, 2018 at UFC Fight Night: Blaydes vs. Ngannou 2 against Martin Day. He won the fight via split decision.

Liu faced Jonathan Martinez on July 13, 2019 at UFC Fight Night: de Randamie vs. Ladd. He lost the fight via knockout in round three.

Liu faced Kang Kyung-ho on December 21, 2019 at UFC Fight Night: Edgar vs. The Korean Zombie. He lost the fight via split decision.

== Personal life ==
Liu trains at Team Alpha Male alongside another UFC Chinese fighter Yadong Song and he is the godfather of Song's son.

== Mixed martial arts record ==
Professional record breakdown
21 matches	15 wins	6 losses
By knockout	4	3
By submission	6	1
By decision	5	2

Res.	Record	Opponent	Method	Event	Date	Round	Time	Location	Notes
Loss	15–6	Kang Kyung-ho	Decision (split)	UFC Fight Night: Edgar vs. The Korean Zombie	December 21, 2019	3	5:00	Busan, South Korea	
Loss	15–5	Jonathan Martinez	KO (knee)	UFC Fight Night: de Randamie vs. Ladd	July 13, 2019	3	3:54	Sacramento, California, United States	
Win	15–4	Martin Day	Decision (split)	UFC Fight Night: Blaydes vs. Ngannou 2	November 24, 2018	3	5:00	Beijing, China	
Win	14–4	Damian Stasiak	Decision (unanimous)	UFC Fight Night: Shogun vs. Smith	July 22, 2018	3	5:00	Hamburg, Germany	
Win	13–4	Yuichi Ohashi	TKO (punches)	WLF: W.A.R.S. 18	October 28, 2017	1	0:12	Barkam, China	
Win	12–4	Nikolay Baykin	Submission (armbar)	WLF: W.A.R.S. 12	March 11, 2017	2	2:49	Zhengzhou, China	Won the WLF Bantamweight Championship.
Win	11–4	Umidjon Musayev	TKO (knees to the body)	WLF E.P.I.C. 9	October 24, 2016	1	3:48	Zhengzhou, China	
Win	10–4	Beno Adamia	Submission (inverted triangle choke)	WLF E.P.I.C. 6	July 23, 2016	1	N/A	Zhengzhou, China	
Win	9–4	Andre Paulet	Submission (guillotine choke)	WLF E.P.I.C. 4	May 28, 2016	1	5:00	Zhengzhou, China	
Win	8–4	Him Chan Jo	Decision (unanimous)	WLF E.P.I.C. 2	March 13, 2016	3	5:00	Zhengzhou, China	
Win	7–4	Arslan Kazimagomedov	TKO (punches)	WLF E.P.I.C. 1	January 13, 2016	1	N/A	Zhengzhou, China	Return to Bantamweight.
Win	6–4	Lianjie Liu	KO (punch)	Ranik Ultimate Fighting Federation 9	May 18, 2013	1	0:17	Sanya, Henan, China	Flyweight bout.
Loss	5–4	Meixuan Zhang	Submission (heel hook)	Ranik Ultimate Fighting Federation 8	September 6, 2013	1	3:11	Hohhot, Mongolia	Flyweight bout.
Win	5–3	Zhifa Shang	Decision (split)	Ranik Ultimate Fighting Federation 6	November 8, 2012	3	5:00	Hohhot, Mongolia	Flyweight bout.
Win	4–3	Meixuan Zhang	Decision (split)	Ranik Ultimate Fighting Federation 5	September 8, 2012	3	5:00	Hohhot, Mongolia	
Win	3–3	Liang Yang	Submission (armbar)	Ranik Ultimate Fighting Federation 4	June 30, 2012	2	3:03	Hohhot, Mongolia	
Win	2–3	Lianjie Liu	Submission (armbar)	Ranik Ultimate Fighting Federation 3	March 24, 2012	1	4:31	Chongqing, China	
Loss	1–3	Rijirigala Amu	Decision (unanimous)	Ranik Ultimate Fighting Federation 2	December 17, 2011	3	5:00	Chongqing, China	
Win	1–2	Dapeng Wang	Submission (armbar)	Top of the Forbidden City 6	September 24, 2011	1	0:54	Beijing, China	
Loss	0–2	Meixuan Zhang	TKO (submission to punches)	Ranik Ultimate Fighting Federation 1	August 27, 2011	2	N/A	Shanghai, China	
Loss	0–1	Chengjie Wu	TKO (punches)	Xian Sports University: Ultimate Wrestle	October 30, 2010	2	4:21	Guangzhou, China	

== See also ==
- List of female mixed martial artists
