= Su Mudaerji =

Chinese mixed martial artist (born 1996)

- Born: January 20, 1996 (age 30); Aba, Sichuan, China
- Other names: The Tibetan Eagle
- Height: 5 ft 8 in (1.73 m)
- Weight: 125 lb (57 kg; 8 st 13 lb)
- Division: Flyweight; Bantamweight
- Reach: 72 in (183 cm)
- Style: Sanda
- Fighting out of: Chengdu, Sichuan, China
- Team: Enbo Fight Club; Team Alpha Male; American Top Team
- Years active: 2016–present

Mixed martial arts record
- Total: 28
- Wins: 20
- By knockout: 13
- By submission: 1
- By decision: 6
- Losses: 7
- By submission: 6
- By decision: 1
- No contests: 1

Other information
- Mixed martial arts record from Sherdog

Su Mudaerji

Chinese name
- Simplified Chinese: 苏木达尔基
- Traditional Chinese: 蘇木達爾基
Transcriptions
Standard Mandarin
- Hanyu Pinyin: Sū Mùdá'ěrjī

Tibetan name
- Tibetan: བསོད་ནམས་དར་རྒྱས།
Transcriptions
- Wylie: Sonam Dhargay

Su Mudaerji (Note: Chinese: 苏木达尔基; pinyin: Sū Mùdá'ěrjī; Standard Tibetan: བསོད་ནམས་དར་རྒྱས།, romanized: Sonam Dhargay) (born January 20, 1996), sometimes written as Sumudaerji, is a Chinese professional mixed martial artist. He currently competes in the Flyweight and Bantamweight divisions of the Ultimate Fighting Championship (UFC). As of August 31, 2026, he is #11 in the Meta UFC flyweight rankings.

== Mixed martial arts career ==
=== Early career ===
In his childhood, Sumudaerji used to herd cattle in the mountains. He was born with a passion for sports. When he was 14 years old, Sumudaerji joined the well-known Enbo Fight Club in Chengdu. He started practicing San Da in 2010 and won the second place in the Sichuan Youth San Da Championship. From 2014 to 2015, he was selected to study in the Sichuan San Da team and then transitioned into MMA. Starting his career in 2016, Mudaerji fought mostly for the Wu Lin Feng promotion, compiling an 11–3 record.

=== Ultimate Fighting Championship ===
Mudaerji made his UFC debut against Louis Smolka at UFC Fight Night 141 on November 24, 2018. He lost the fight via submission in round two.

Mudaerji next faced Andre Soukhamthath on August 31, 2019, at UFC Fight Night 157. He won the fight via unanimous decision.

Mudaerji faced Malcolm Gordon on November 28, 2020, at UFC on ESPN 18. He won the fight via knockout in round one. He earned a Performance of the Night bonus for the win.

Replacing Jeff Molina, Mudaerji faced Zarrukh Adashev on January 20, 2021, at UFC on ESPN 20. He won the fight via unanimous decision.

Mudaerji was scheduled to face Tim Elliott on June 26, 2021, at UFC Fight Night 190. However, Mudaerji pulled out due to a knee injury.

Mudaerji was scheduled to face Manel Kape on April 23, 2022, at UFC Fight Night 205. However, just three days before the event, Kape withdrew for personal reasons and the bout was scrapped.

Mudaerji faced Matt Schnell on July 16, 2022, at UFC on ABC 3. Despite a triangle attempt in the first round, Mudaerji lost the bout via technical submission due to a triangle choke in the second round. This win earned both fighters the Fight of the Night bonus award.

Mudaerji was scheduled to face Allan Nascimento on December 9, 2023, at UFC Fight Night 233. However, Nascimento withdrew from the fight due to injury and was replaced by Tim Elliott. He lost the fight via arm-triangle choke in round one.

Mudaerji was scheduled to face Joshua Van on June 1, 2024 at UFC 302. However, for undisclosed reasons, Mudaerji was pulled from the event and Van was re-scheduled for another event as a result.

Mudaerji faced Charles Johnson on October 19, 2024 at UFC Fight Night 245. He lost the fight by unanimous decision.

Mudaerji faced Mitch Raposo on April 12, 2025 at UFC 314. He won the fight by split decision.

Mudaerji faced Kevin Borjas on August 23, 2025 at UFC Fight Night 257. He won the fight by unanimous decision.

Mudaerji faced Jesús Santos Aguilar on March 7, 2026, at UFC 326. He won the fight by unanimous decision.

Mudaerji faced Alex Perez on May 30, 2026 at UFC Fight Night 277. The bout was ruled a no contest midway through the second round due to an accidental low blow by Mudaerji that left Perez unable to continue.

Mudaerji faced Perez on August 29, 2026 at UFC Fight Night 286 in a rematch. He won the fight by unanimous decision.

== Personal life ==
Mudaerji is the first UFC fighter of Tibetan ethnicity.

Su Mu who is one of the main characters in the film Never Say Never is based on Mudaerji.

== Championships and accomplishments ==
=== Mixed martial arts ===
- Ultimate Fighting Championship
  - Performance of the Night (One time) vs. Malcolm Gordon
  - Fight of the Night (One time) vs. Matt Schnell
  - UFC Honors Awards
    - 2022: President's Choice Fight of the Year Nominee vs. Matt Schnell
  - UFC.com Awards
    - 2022: Ranked #5 Fight of the Year vs. Matt Schnell

=== Sanda ===
- 2010 Sichuan Junior Sanda Championship − 2nd place

== Mixed martial arts record ==
Professional record breakdown
28 matches	20 wins	7 losses
By knockout	13	0
By submission	1	6
By decision	6	1
No contests	1	

Res.	Record	Opponent	Method	Event	Date	Round	Time	Location	Notes
Win	20–7 (1)	Alex Perez	Decision (unanimous)	UFC Fight Night: Nurmagomedov vs. Song	August 29, 2026	3	5:00	Shanghai, China	
NC	19–7 (1)	Alex Perez	NC (accidental groin kick)	UFC Fight Night: Song vs. Figueiredo	May 30, 2026	2	1:45	Macau SAR, China	Accidental groin kick rendered Perez unable to continue.
Win	19–7	Jesús Santos Aguilar	Decision (unanimous)	UFC 326	March 7, 2026	3	5:00	Las Vegas, Nevada, United States	
Win	18–7	Kevin Borjas	Decision (unanimous)	UFC Fight Night: Walker vs. Zhang	August 23, 2025	3	5:00	Shanghai, China	
Win	17–7	Mitch Raposo	Decision (split)	UFC 314	April 12, 2025	3	5:00	Miami, Florida, United States	
Loss	16–7	Charles Johnson	Decision (unanimous)	UFC Fight Night: Hernandez vs. Pereira	October 19, 2024	3	5:00	Las Vegas, Nevada, United States	
Loss	16–6	Tim Elliott	Technical Submission (arm-triangle choke)	UFC Fight Night: Song vs. Gutiérrez	December 9, 2023	1	4:02	Las Vegas, Nevada, United States	Bantamweight bout.
Loss	16–5	Matt Schnell	Technical Submission (triangle choke)	UFC on ABC: Ortega vs. Rodríguez	July 16, 2022	2	4:24	Elmont, New York, United States	Fight of the Night.
Win	16–4	Zarrukh Adashev	Decision (unanimous)	UFC on ESPN: Chiesa vs. Magny	January 20, 2021	3	5:00	Abu Dhabi, United Arab Emirates	
Win	15–4	Malcolm Gordon	KO (punches)	UFC on ESPN: Smith vs. Clark	November 28, 2020	1	0:44	Las Vegas, Nevada, United States	Return to Flyweight. Performance of the Night.
Win	14–4	Andre Soukhamthath	Decision (unanimous)	UFC Fight Night: Andrade vs. Zhang	August 31, 2019	3	5:00	Shenzhen, China	
Loss	13–4	Louis Smolka	Submission (armbar)	UFC Fight Night: Blaydes vs. Ngannou 2	November 24, 2018	2	2:07	Beijing, China	
Loss	13–3	Ma Hao Bin	Technical Submission (rear-naked choke)	WLF: W.A.R.S. 28	October 26, 2018	2	3:57	Zhengzhou, China	Flyweight bout.
Win	13–2	Yusei Saiton	KO (punches)	ABA FC: Hongyuan	August 2, 2018	1	0:53	Hongyuan County, China	
Win	12–2	Temirulan Bamadaliev	TKO (punches)	WLF: W.A.R.S. 25	June 27, 2018	1	2:14	Zhengzhou, China	Catchweight (130 lb) bout.
Win	11–2	Zelimkhan Makaev	KO (spinning back kick)	WLF: W.A.R.S. 23	April 14, 2018	1	4:01	Zhengzhou, China	Bantamweight debut.
Win	10–2	Bidzina Gavashelishvili	KO (flying knee)	WLF: W.A.R.S. 22	March 17, 2018	1	2:36	Kaifeng, China	Catchweight (128 lb) bout.
Loss	9–2	Abdulla Aliev	Submission (rear-naked choke)	WLF: W.A.R.S. 21	January 13, 2018	3	3:16	Zhengzhou, China	For the vacant WLF Flyweight Championship.
Win	9–1	Kirill	KO (punch to the body)	IPFC: YunFeng Showdown 7	November 25, 2017	1	3:19	Laizhou, China	Catchweight (130 lb) bout.
Win	8–1	Ryota Kobayashi	TKO (punches)	WLF: W.A.R.S. 18	October 28, 2017	1	1:19	Maerkang, China	Catchweight (130 lb) bout.
Win	7–1	Jomar Manlangit	KO (punch to the body)	WLF: W.A.R.S. 17	September 16, 2017	2	1:20	Zhengzhou, China	Catchweight (130 lb) bout.
Win	6–1	Liu Pengshuai	KO (punches)	Chin Woo Men: 2016-2017 Season, Stage 6	April 7, 2017	1	4:28	Guangzhou, China	
Win	5–1	Gao Junye	KO (punches)	WLF World Championship	January 13, 2017	1	3:38	Zhengzhou, China	
Win	4–1	Teimur Ragimov	Submission (rear-naked choke)	WLF: E.P.I.C. 8	September 28, 2016	3	1:15	Zhengzhou, China	
Win	3–1	Isaias Celiva	TKO (doctor stoppage)	WLF: E.P.I.C. 5	June 29, 2016	2	5:00	Zhengzhou, China	
Win	2–1	Leonid Malozemov	KO (head kick)	WLF: E.P.I.C. 3	April 23, 2016	2	0:06	Zhengzhou, China	
Loss	1–1	Yusuke Uehara	Submission (straight armbar)	WLF: E.P.I.C. 2	March 13, 2016	1	2:41	Zhengzhou, China	
Win	1–0	Lim Seung-heon	TKO (doctor stoppage)	WLF: E.P.I.C. 1	January 13, 2016	1	2:44	Zhengzhou, China	Flyweight debut.

== See also ==
- List of current UFC fighters
- List of male mixed martial artists
