= Gian Villante =

American mixed martial artist (born 1985

- Born: August 18, 1985 (age 41); Wantagh, New York, U.S.
- Height: 6 ft 2 in (1.88 m)
- Weight: 261 lb (118 kg; 18 st 9 lb)
- Division: Light heavyweight Heavyweight
- Reach: 76 in (193 cm)
- Style: Kickboxing, Wrestling
- Fighting out of: Bellmore, New York, U.S.
- Team: Bellmore Kickboxing Academy; Long Island MMA and Fitness Center; Serra–Longo Fight Team
- Rank: Blue belt in Brazilian Jiu-Jitsu
- Wrestling: NCAA Division I Wrestling
- Years active: 2009–2021

Mixed martial arts record
- Total: 31
- Wins: 17
- By knockout: 10
- By submission: 2
- By decision: 5
- Losses: 14
- By knockout: 6
- By submission: 1
- By decision: 7

Other information
- University: Hofstra University
- Notable school: MacArthur High School (Levittown, New York)
- Mixed martial arts record from Sherdog

Gian Villante (born August 18, 1985) is an American retired mixed martial artist who previously fought in the Light heavyweight and heavyweight divisions of the Ultimate Fighting Championship. A professional from 2009 to 2021, he also has competed for Strikeforce.

== Background ==
Villante attended MacArthur High School (Levittown, New York) and was part of the class of 2003. During his junior year, he placed third in the New York State Wrestling Championships. He followed this up his senior year by winning the New York State Championship at the 215-pound weight class. Villante also earned all-American honors following a 5th-place finish in the 215 lbs weight class at the 2003 NHSCA senior national wrestling tournament. Villante was equally accomplished in football, in which he received the 2002 Thorpe Award winner as the top football player in Nassau County, also the Bill Piner Award as the top linebacker in Nassau County and was named to the High School Heisman All-Star team. Villante drew interest from major Division I schools, such as Penn State and Michigan State. Villante chose to stay home and committed to Hofstra University. Villante attended Hofstra University from 2003 to 2007 where he continued his highly successful football and wrestling careers. Villante started his first game against Marshall University, as a true freshman, at middle linebacker. Gian kept his starting role the rest of his first year. The following season Villante was named a 2004 1st Team Defensive I-AA All-American by The Sports Network. He was regarded as a potential NFL linebacker prospect. The New York Giants, New York Jets, Indianapolis Colts, and Philadelphia Eagles all expressed interest in Villante. Villante wrestled for Hofstra where he became close with NCAA All-American wrestler and future UFC Middleweight Champion Chris Weidman.

== Mixed martial arts career ==
=== Ring of Combat ===
Villante made his MMA debut quickly after making the decision to begin MMA training. He defeated MMA veteran Randy Durant by quickly drawing a TKO due to a nasty cut. Villante then flew through his next few opponents, only once having it last through the first round. He quickly was the top Heavyweight contender in Ring of Combat. He got his shot and after defeating Strikeforce veteran Mike Cook for the vacant Ring of Combat Heavyweight title, Villante was touted as a legit MMA prospect.

Villante made his Light Heavyweight debut at Ring of Combat XXIX with aspirations on becoming a champion in two weight classes. However Villante lost by TKO after breaking his elbow and moved back up to heavyweight. After an extended recovery from his wrist injury, Villante had a highlight reel KO win over Joseph Reyes.

=== Strikeforce ===
On January 11, 2011, it was announced that Villante had signed a multi-fight deal with Strikeforce. Villante was quickly thrown into a Heavyweight Grand Prix Reserve bout on short notice. His opponent would be Chad Griggs in one of three heavyweight grand prix reserve bouts at Strikeforce: Fedor vs. Silva. In which many people called the fight, the "Fight of the Night." He lost the fight via TKO in the first round on a referee stoppage.

Villante made the decision to drop back down to light heavyweight. In his next bout, Villante would take on undefeated prospect Lorenz Larkin on June 24, 2011, at Strikeforce Challengers: Fodor vs. Terry. After repeatedly taking down Larkin and easily taking the first round, Villante appeared to be suffering from his dramatic weight cutting. Villante began to tire and eventually Larkin went on to win a unanimous decision. Questions began to swirl as to whether or not Villante could effectively complete a Three Round Fight. He was also criticized for not sticking to a wrestling game plan.

In his next fight, Villante took on Keith Berry in the Strikeforce Challengers: Gurgel vs. Duarte preliminary card. Despite the crowd's jeers, and multiple stand ups, Gian continually took down Berry and went on to win the fight unanimously on the judges scorecards.

Villante's next fight was against Trevor Smith on the preliminary card of Strikeforce: Rockhold vs. Jardine on January 7, 2012. Gian quickly attacked Smith catching a leg strike four seconds in. After landing several clean punches and knees on the ground, both stood up. The two trade strikes for about thirty seconds, when Villante once again caught a Smith kick and took him down. Villante held onto the leg and began landing numerous unanswered right hands, prompting referee Kim Winslow to stop the fight at 1:05 of the first round.

Gian continued his win streak with a unanimous decision victory over Derrick Mehmen. This was part of the Strikeforce: Barnett vs. Cormier undercard seen on Showtime Extreme. Gian was credited by announcer Frank Shamrock for his improved standup and his endurance during the fight. Mehmen had visible bruising on his thighs from the multiple leg kicks landed by Villante.

Gian was scheduled to fight undefeated Guto Inocente on the Strikeforce: Melendez vs. Healy main card. The entire card was canceled due to headliner Gilbert Melendez suffering an injury. Without the main event, Showtime canceled the entire event. Gian was featured in Newsday shortly after the announcement. The article featured Gian explaining how he was extremely upset about the cancellation, but focused more on how Gian was finally able to eat, after his grueling ordeal to make weight.

=== Ultimate Fighting Championship ===
In January 2013, the Strikeforce organization was closed by its parent company Zuffa. A list of fighters scheduled to be brought over to the Ultimate Fighting Championship was released in mid-January and Villante was one of the fighters listed.

For his UFC debut, Villante faced fellow promotional newcomer Ovince St. Preux on April 27, 2013, at UFC 159. The fight ended in unusual fashion as St. Preux accidentally poked Villante in the right eye with his thumb and referee Kevin Mulhall immediately called an end to the fight after Villante indicated that he could not see. As a result of the injury, the fight went to the judges' scorecards and St. Preux won a majority technical decision (30–28, 30–29, and 29–29).

Villante took a short notice bout, replacing Robert Drysdale against Cody Donovan on November 16, 2014, at UFC 167. He won the fight via TKO in the second round, earning his first official UFC victory.

For his third fight with the promotion, Villante faced Fábio Maldonado on March 23, 2014, at UFC Fight Night 38. He lost the fight via unanimous decision.

Villante was expected to face Anthony Perosh on June 28, 2014, at UFC Fight Night 43. However, Perosh was forced out of the bout with an injury and was replaced by Sean O'Connell. He won the fight via split decision. Their performance earned both participants Fight of the Night honors.

Villante was expected to face Corey Anderson on December 6, 2014, at UFC 181. However, Villante pulled out of the fight citing an injury. Anderson remained on the card against Justin Jones.

The bout with Anderson eventually took place on April 18, 2015, at UFC on Fox 15. Villante won the fight via TKO in the third round. The fight also earned him his second Fight of the Night bonus award.

Villante faced Tom Lawlor on July 25, 2015, at UFC on Fox 16. Despite controlling the first round with strikes, Villante lost the bout via knockout early in the second round.

Villante faced Anthony Perosh on November 15, 2015, at UFC 193. Villante won the fight via knockout in the first round.

Villante next faced Ilir Latifi on March 5, 2016, at UFC 196. He lost the fight by unanimous decision.

Villante was briefly linked to a bout with Marcos Rogério de Lima on November 12, 2016, at UFC 205. However, Villante pulled out of the fight on September 21 citing a minor injury and the bout was scrapped. In turn, Villante is expected to face Patrick Cummins the following month on December 9, 2016, at UFC Fight Night 102. Subsequently, Cummins pulled out of the fight on December 2 citing a staph infection. He was replaced by promotional newcomer Saparbek Safarov. Villante won the fight via TKO in the second round. Both participants were awarded Fight of the Night for their performance.

Villante faced Maurício Rua on March 11, 2017, at UFC Fight Night 106. He lost the fight via TKO in the third round.

A rescheduled bout with Patrick Cummins eventually took place on July 22, 2017, at UFC on Fox 25. Villante lost the back-and-forth fight via split decision.

Villante faced Francimar Barroso on January 20, 2018, at UFC 220. He won the fight via split decision .

Villante fought Sam Alvey on June 1, 2018, at UFC Fight Night 131. He lost the fight via split decision.

Villante fought Ed Herman on October 27, 2018, at UFC Fight Night 138. He won the back-and-forth fight via split decision.

Villante faced Michał Oleksiejczuk on February 23, 2019, at UFC Fight Night 145. He lost the fight via TKO due to a body punch early in the first round.

Villante was expected to face Mike Rodriguez on July 13, 2019, at UFC Fight Night 155. However, on July 4, 2019, Villante pulled out of the event for an undisclosed reason and was replaced by John Allan.

Villante faced Maurice Greene on June 27, 2020, at UFC on ESPN: Poirier vs. Hooker. He lost the fight via an arm-triangle choke submission in the third round.

Villante faced Jake Collier on December 5, 2020 at UFC on ESPN 19. He lost the fight via unanimous decision.

Villante fought Chris Barnett on November 6, 2021 at UFC 268. He lost the fight via TKO in round two after getting knocked down via a spinning wheel kick. Villante announced his retirement after the fight, and planned to return to football as a coach.

== Personal life ==
Villante is Italian American. He and his long-time girlfriend Katie have a son, Gianluca, born December 2019 and a daughter, Joey, born October 2021.

Gian is currently coaching multiple sports at Islip High School, located in Islip, New York, on Long Island.

== Championships and accomplishments ==
=== Mixed martial arts ===
- Ultimate Fighting Championship
  - Fight of the Night (Three times) vs. Sean O'Connell, Corey Anderson and Saparbek Safarov
  - First and only fighter to compete in four consecutive split decision bouts
  - UFC.com Awards
    - 2015: Ranked #10 Fight of the Year vs. Corey Anderson
- Ring of Combat
  - Ring of Combat Heavyweight Championship (One time)
  - Ring of Combat Light Heavyweight Championship (One time)
- MMAJunkie.com
  - 2015 April Fight of the Month vs. Corey Anderson

=== Football ===
- High school football
  - 2001 All-Section VIII Linebacker
  - 2001 All-Long Island Linebacker (Sect VIII&XI)
  - 2002 All-Section VIII Linebacker
  - 2002 All-Long Island Linebacker (Sect VIII&XI)
  - 2002 Piner Award (Best Linebacker – Section VIII – Nassau County)
  - 2002 Thorpe Award (Best Football Player – Section VIII – Nassau County)
  - 2002 1st Team All-New York State
  - 2002 1st All-Metro Team (Lower NY-Upper NJ)
- College football
  - 2004 2nd Team Defensive All-Atlantic 10
  - 2004 1st Team Defensive I-AA All-American
  - 2006 1st Team Defensive All-Atlantic 10
  - 2007 1st Team Defensive All-Colonial Conference

=== Wrestling ===
- High school wrestling
  - 2002 Section VIII Nassau County Champion (215 lbs)
  - 2002 New York State 3rd Place (215 lbs)
  - 2003 Section VIII Nassau County Champion (215 lbs)
  - 2003 New York State Champion (215 lbs)

== Mixed martial arts record ==
Professional record breakdown
31 matches	17 wins	14 losses
By knockout	10	6
By submission	2	1
By decision	5	7

Res.	Record	Opponent	Method	Event	Date	Round	Time	Location	Notes
Loss	17–14	Chris Barnett	TKO (spinning wheel kick and punches)	UFC 268	November 6, 2021	2	2:23	New York City, New York, United States	
Loss	17–13	Jake Collier	Decision (unanimous)	UFC on ESPN: Hermansson vs. Vettori	December 5, 2020	3	5:00	Las Vegas, Nevada, United States	
Loss	17–12	Maurice Greene	Submission (arm-triangle choke)	UFC on ESPN: Poirier vs. Hooker	June 27, 2020	3	3:44	Las Vegas, Nevada, United States	Return to Heavyweight.
Loss	17–11	Michał Oleksiejczuk	TKO (body punch)	UFC Fight Night: Błachowicz vs. Santos	February 23, 2019	1	1:34	Prague, Czech Republic	
Win	17–10	Ed Herman	Decision (split)	UFC Fight Night: Volkan vs. Smith	October 27, 2018	3	5:00	Moncton, New Brunswick, Canada	
Loss	16–10	Sam Alvey	Decision (split)	UFC Fight Night: Rivera vs. Moraes	June 1, 2018	3	5:00	Utica, New York, United States	
Win	16–9	Francimar Barroso	Decision (split)	UFC 220	January 20, 2018	3	5:00	Boston, Massachusetts, United States	
Loss	15–9	Patrick Cummins	Decision (split)	UFC on Fox: Weidman vs. Gastelum	July 22, 2017	3	5:00	Uniondale, New York, United States	
Loss	15–8	Maurício Rua	TKO (punches)	UFC Fight Night: Belfort vs. Gastelum	March 11, 2017	3	0:59	Fortaleza, Brazil	
Win	15–7	Saparbek Safarov	TKO (punches)	UFC Fight Night: Lewis vs. Abdurakhimov	December 9, 2016	2	2:54	Albany, New York, United States	Fight of the Night.
Loss	14–7	Ilir Latifi	Decision (unanimous)	UFC 196	March 5, 2016	3	5:00	Las Vegas, Nevada, United States	
Win	14–6	Anthony Perosh	KO (punch)	UFC 193	November 15, 2015	1	2:56	Melbourne, Australia	
Loss	13–6	Tom Lawlor	KO (punch)	UFC on Fox: Dillashaw vs. Barão 2	July 25, 2015	2	0:27	Chicago, Illinois, United States	
Win	13–5	Corey Anderson	TKO (punches)	UFC on Fox: Machida vs. Rockhold	April 18, 2015	3	4:18	Newark, New Jersey, United States	Fight of the Night.
Win	12–5	Sean O'Connell	Decision (split)	UFC Fight Night: Te Huna vs. Marquardt	June 28, 2014	3	5:00	Auckland, New Zealand	Fight of the Night.
Loss	11–5	Fábio Maldonado	Decision (unanimous)	UFC Fight Night: Shogun vs. Henderson 2	March 23, 2014	3	5:00	Natal, Brazil	
Win	11–4	Cody Donovan	TKO (punches)	UFC 167	November 16, 2013	2	1:22	Las Vegas, Nevada, United States	
Loss	10–4	Ovince Saint Preux	Technical Decision (majority)	UFC 159	April 27, 2013	3	0:33	Newark, New Jersey, United States	Inadvertent eye poke rendered Villante unable to continue.
Win	10–3	Derrick Mehmen	Decision (unanimous)	Strikeforce: Barnett vs. Cormier	May 19, 2012	3	5:00	San Jose, California, United States	
Win	9–3	Trevor Smith	TKO (punches)	Strikeforce: Rockhold vs. Jardine	January 7, 2012	1	1:05	Las Vegas, Nevada, United States	
Win	8–3	Keith Berry	Decision (unanimous)	Strikeforce Challengers: Gurgel vs. Duarte	August 12, 2011	3	5:00	Las Vegas, Nevada, United States	
Loss	7–3	Lorenz Larkin	Decision (unanimous)	Strikeforce Challengers: Fodor vs. Terry	June 24, 2011	3	5:00	Kent, Washington, United States	
Loss	7–2	Chad Griggs	TKO (punches)	Strikeforce: Fedor vs. Silva	February 12, 2011	1	2:49	East Rutherford, New Jersey, United States	Heavyweight Grand Prix reserve bout.
Win	7–1	Joseph Reyes	TKO (punches)	Ring of Combat 33	December 3, 2010	1	1:03	Atlantic City, New Jersey, United States	Won the vacant Ring of Combat Light Heavyweight Championship.
Loss	6–1	Demetrius Richards	TKO (arm injury)	Ring of Combat 29	April 16, 2010	1	3:27	Atlantic City, New Jersey, United States	Light Heavyweight debut.
Win	6–0	Mike Cook	Submission (rear-naked choke)	Ring of Combat 28	February 19, 2010	1	1:36	Atlantic City, New Jersey, United States	Won the vacant Ring of Combat Heavyweight Championship.
Win	5–0	Marcelo Pereira	KO (punch)	Ring of Combat 27	November 20, 2009	1	3:59	Atlantic City, New Jersey, United States	Catchweight (215 lb) bout.
Win	4–0	Rob Wince	KO (head kick)	Ring of Combat 26	September 11, 2009	2	1:25	Atlantic City, New Jersey, United States	
Win	3–0	Joe Abouata	TKO (punches)	Ring of Combat 25	June 12, 2009	1	1:48	Atlantic City, New Jersey, United States	
Win	2–0	Paul White	Submission (rear-naked choke)	Ring of Combat 24	April 17, 2009	1	1:46	Atlantic City, New Jersey, United States	
Win	1–0	Randy Durant	TKO (doctor stoppage)	Ring of Combat 23	February 20, 2009	1	0:35	Atlantic City, New Jersey, United States	Doctor stoppage due to cut.

== See also ==
- List of male mixed martial artists
