= UFC 225 =

UFC mixed martial arts event in 2018

UFC 225: Whittaker vs. Romero 2
- The poster for UFC 225: Whittaker vs. Romero 2
- Promotion: Ultimate Fighting Championship
- Date: June 9, 2018
- Venue: United Center
- City: Chicago, Illinois
- Attendance: 18,117
- Total gate: $2,550,000
- Buyrate: 250,000

Event chronology
UFC Fight Night: Rivera vs. Moraes	UFC 225: Whittaker vs. Romero 2	UFC Fight Night: Cowboy vs. Edwards

UFC 225: Whittaker vs. Romero 2 was a mixed martial arts event produced by the Ultimate Fighting Championship that was held on June 9, 2018, at the United Center in Chicago, Illinois.

== Background ==
A UFC Middleweight Championship bout between current champion Robert Whittaker and former interim title challenger (as well as 2000 Olympic silver medalist and former world champion in freestyle wrestling) Yoel Romero served as the event headliner. The pairing previously met in July 2017 at UFC 213 with Whittaker winning the interim title via unanimous decision.

However at the weigh-ins, Romero initially weighed in at 186 pounds, 1 pound over the middleweight limit for a title fight. Romero was given additional time to make weight, but he weighed in at 185.2 pounds. The commission initially gave him an additional 2 hours, but after an hour Romero was made to stop cutting weight, and the bout proceeded as a non-title contest. He was fined 30 percent of his purse, which went to Whittaker.

An interim UFC Welterweight Championship bout between former UFC Lightweight Champion Rafael dos Anjos and Colby Covington (initially linked to UFC 224 a month earlier) served as the co-main event.

Rashad Coulter was scheduled to face Allen Crowder at the event. However, on May 12, it was announced that Chris de la Rocha has replaced Crowder for undisclosed reasons.

Bobby Green was scheduled to face Clay Guida at the event. However, on May 29, Green suffered an injury on his right knee and was replaced by Charles Oliveira.

== Results ==
Main Card
Weight class				Method	Round	Time	Notes
Middleweight	Robert Whittaker (c)	def.	Yoel Romero	Decision (split) (47–48, 48–47, 48–47)	5	5:00	(Note: Non-title bout; Romero missed weight (185.2 lb).)
Welterweight	Colby Covington	def.	Rafael dos Anjos	Decision (unanimous) (49–46, 48–47, 48–47)	5	5:00	(Note: For the interim UFC Welterweight Championship.)
Women's Featherweight	Holly Holm	def.	Megan Anderson	Decision (unanimous) (30–27, 30–26, 30–26)	3	5:00
Heavyweight	Tai Tuivasa	def.	Andrei Arlovski	Decision (unanimous) (29–28, 29–28, 29–28)	3	5:00
Welterweight	CM Punk	vs.	Mike Jackson	No Contest (overturned)	3	5:00	(Note: Originally a unanimous decision (30–26, 30–26, 30–26) win for Jackson; overturned after he tested positive for marijuana.)
Preliminary card (Fox Sports 1)
Heavyweight	Curtis Blaydes	def.	Alistair Overeem	TKO (elbows)	3	2:56
Women's Strawweight	Cláudia Gadelha	def.	Carla Esparza	Decision (split) (28–29, 29–28, 29–28)	3	5:00
Featherweight	Mirsad Bektić	def.	Ricardo Lamas	Decision (split) (29–28, 28–29, 30–27)	3	5:00
Heavyweight	Chris de la Rocha	def.	Rashad Coulter	TKO (punches)	2	3:53
Preliminary card (UFC Fight Pass)
Light Heavyweight	Anthony Smith	def.	Rashad Evans	KO (knee)	1	0:53
Flyweight	Sergio Pettis	def.	Joseph Benavidez	Decision (split) (28–29, 29–28, 30–27)	3	5:00
Lightweight	Charles Oliveira	def.	Clay Guida	Submission (guillotine choke)	1	2:18
Featherweight	Dan Ige	def.	Mike Santiago	TKO (punches)	1	0:50

== Bonus awards ==
The following fighters were awarded $50,000 bonuses:

- Fight of the Night ($100,000): Robert Whittaker (Yoel Romero was unable to receive his share of the bonus money due to missing weight).
- Performance of the Night: Curtis Blaydes and Charles Oliveira

== Aftermath ==
On July 7, 2021, it was announced that the Illinois Department of Financial and Professional Regulation overturned Mike Jackson's unanimous decision win against CM Punk to a no contest due to a marijuana positive test on fight night. He was officially suspended for three months retroactive to the date of the fight. The decision wasn't reported publicly until July 2021.

== See also ==
- List of UFC events
- List of current UFC fighters
- 2018 in UFC
