= Rashad Coulter =

American mixed martial artist

- Born: Orlando Rashad Coulter; November 27, 1981 (age 44); Newton, North Carolina, U.S.
- Other names: Daywalker
- Nationality: American
- Height: 5 ft 11 in (180 cm)
- Weight: 259 lb (117 kg; 18.5 st)
- Division: Light heavyweight (2013, 2016, 2018–2019); Heavyweight (2011, 2014–2015, 2016–present)
- Reach: 76 in (193 cm)
- Style: Boxing, Muay Thai
- Fighting out of: Dallas, Texas, U.S.
- Team: Saekson Janjira Muay Thai (formerly); Octagon MMA (until 2016); Fortis MMA (2016–present)
- Years active: 2011–present

Professional boxing record
- Total: 7
- Wins: 5
- By knockout: 3
- Losses: 2

Mixed martial arts record
- Total: 14
- Wins: 9
- By knockout: 8
- By decision: 1
- Losses: 5
- By knockout: 4
- By submission: 1

Other information
- Boxing record from BoxRec
- Mixed martial arts record from Sherdog

Orlando Rashad Coulter (born November 27, 1981) is an American professional mixed martial artist who most recently competed in the light heavyweight division of the Ultimate Fighting Championship. A professional since 2011, he has also competed for Bellator MMA and Legacy Fighting Championship.

== Background ==
Coulter was born in North Carolina but eventually moved to Texas with his single parent father. Prior to beginning MMA, Coulter played American football for 17 years. He graduated from Plano East Senior High School and continued to Texas A&M University–Commerce from where he dropped out after complete quadriceps tear shattered his NFL dream. He was introduced to mixed martial arts by his childhood friend Muhammed Lawal and began training in Muay Thai in early 2010. Lawal also gave Coulter the nickname "The Daywalker."

== Mixed martial arts career ==
=== Early career ===
Coulter made his professional MMA debut in June 2011. Over the next five-and-a-half years, he amassed a record of 8 wins against 1 loss with all of his wins coming via knockout.

=== Ultimate Fighting Championship ===
For his UFC debut, Coulter stepped in to replace Dmitry Poberezhets on short notice against Chase Sherman at UFC 211 on May 13, 2017. Coulter lost the fight by knockout in the second round. However, the back-and-forth action earned both participants Fight of the Night honors.

For his second fight in the promotion, Coulter faced debuting Tai Tuivasa on November 19, 2017, at UFC Fight Night: Werdum vs. Tybura. He lost the fight via knockout due to a flying knee in the first round.

In his third fight for the promotion, Coulter was scheduled to face Allen Crowder on June 19, 2018, at UFC 225. However, on May 12, it was announced that Chris de la Rocha has replaced Crowder for undisclosed reasons. Coulter lost the fight via TKO in the second round.

In his fourth fight for the promotion, Coulter moved to Light heavyweight to face Hu Yaozong on November 24, 2018, at UFC Fight Night: Blaydes vs. Ngannou 2. At the weigh-ins, Coulter weighed in at 208 pounds, 2 pounds over the light heavyweight non-title fight limit of 206. He was fined 20 percent of his purse, which went to his opponent. Coulter won the fight by unanimous decision, marking his first decision win in his career and UFC win in his year with the company.

=== Post-UFC career ===
After departing with the UFC, Coulter challenged Ike Villanueva for the Fury FC Light Heavyweight Championship at Fury FC 40 on December 13, 2019. After being knocked down early in the fight, he was eventually finished by technical knockout later in the round.

Coulter was scheduled to face Ty Flores at Fury FC 48 on July 25, 2021. This was later changed to Fury FC 51 on September 12, 2021, and was subsequently cancelled.

Coulter was then scheduled to face Christian Larsen for the Unified MMA Heavyweight Championship at Unified MMA 45 on May 27, 2022. However, Coulter withdrew from the fight and was replaced by Grayson Wells.

== Bare-knuckle boxing career ==
Coulter made his bare knuckle debut at BYB Extreme's BYB 16 Dubai Brawl in Dubai, UAE winning by first round TKO over Quentin Domingoes.

Coulter was scheduled to face Lavar Johnson on November 23, 2024 at BKFC Fight Night: Los Angeles. However, Couter withdrew for unknown reasons and was eventually replaced by Anthony Garrett.

Coulter faced Leonardo Perdomo on March 20, 2026 at BKFC 87. He lost the fight by technical knockout in the first round.

== Boxing career ==
Before signing with the UFC, Coulter competed in professional boxing and amassed a record of 4–0 with three knockouts.

== Personal life ==
Coulter is a married with two sons.

== Championships and accomplishments ==
=== Mixed martial arts ===
- Ultimate Fighting Championship
  - Fight of the Night (One time) vs. Chase Sherman

== Mixed martial arts record ==
Professional record breakdown
14 matches	9 wins	5 losses
By knockout	8	4
By submission	0	1
By decision	1	0

Res.	Record	Opponent	Method	Event	Date	Round	Time	Location	Notes
Loss	9–5	Ike Villanueva	TKO (punches)	Fury FC 40	December 13, 2019	1	3:17	Humble, Texas, United States	For the Fury FC Light Heavyweight Championship.
Win	9–4	Hu Yaozong	Decision (unanimous)	UFC Fight Night: Blaydes vs. Ngannou 2	November 24, 2018	3	5:00	Beijing, China	Return to Light Heavyweight; Coulter missed weight (208 lbs).
Loss	8–4	Chris de la Rocha	TKO (punches)	UFC 225	June 9, 2018	2	3:53	Chicago, Illinois, United States	
Loss	8–3	Tai Tuivasa	KO (flying knee)	UFC Fight Night: Werdum vs. Tybura	November 18, 2017	1	4:35	Sydney, Australia	
Loss	8–2	Chase Sherman	KO (elbow)	UFC 211	May 13, 2017	2	3:36	Dallas, Texas, United States	Fight of the Night.
Win	8–1	Larry Hopkins	KO (punches)	Legacy Fighting Alliance 1	January 13, 2017	1	0:38	Dallas, Texas, United States	
Win	7–1	Jeremy Hardy	KO (punch)	Legacy Fighting Championship 61	October 14, 2016	1	1:11	Dallas, Texas, United States	Return to Heavyweight.
Win	6–1	Allen Nelson	KO (punches)	Xtreme Knockout 30	April 30, 2016	1	2:49	Dallas, Texas, United States	Light Heavyweight debut.
Win	5–1	Jeremiah O'Neal	TKO (knee and punches)	Bellator 135	March 27, 2015	1	1:44	Thackerville, Oklahoma, United States	
Win	4–1	Alex Madrid	TKO (punches)	RFA 35: Moises vs. Castillo	October 18, 2014	1	2:52	Arlington, Texas, United States	Return to Heavyweight.
Loss	3–1	Derek Perkins	Submission (kimura)	Xtreme Knockout 18	March 23, 2013	1	2:03	Arlington, Texas, United States	Middleweight debut; Coulter missed weight (187 lbs).
Win	3–0	Chase Watson	TKO (punches)	Shark Fights 21	November 11, 2011	3	2:39	Lubbock, Texas, United States	
Win	2–0	Alfredo Ayala	TKO (punches)	24/7 Entertainment 2	September 10, 2011	1	2:19	Midland, Texas, United States	
Win	1–0	Manuel Rodriguez	KO (punch)	24/7 Entertainment 2	June 10, 2011	2	1:56	Amarillo, Texas, United States	

== Professional boxing record ==
7 fights	5 wins	2 losses
By knockout	3	0
By decision	2	2

No.	Result	Record	Opponent	Type	Round, time	Date	Location	Notes
7	Loss	5–2	(United States) John Shipman	SD	6	29 Jul 2023	(United States) Riders Field, Frisco, Texas, U.S.	
6	Loss	5–1	(Mexico) Edgar Ramirez	UD	6	11 Feb 2023	(United States) Southern Junction Nightclub, Irving, Texas, U.S.	
5	Win	5–0	(Mexico) Luis Pascual	UD	6	24 Sep 2022	(United States) Indoor Soccer World, Mesquite, Texas, U.S.	
4	Win	4–0	(United States) Greg Dismukes	KO	1 (4), 2:00	20 Aug 2016	(United States) Omni Dallas Hotel, Dallas, Texas, U.S.	
3	Win	3–0	(United States) James Hall	KO	1 (6), 2:16	15 Aug 2015	(United States) Fairmont Hotel, Dallas, Texas, U.S.	
2	Win	2–0	(United States) Armando Herrera Jr.	KO	1 (4), 2:27	5 Jun 2015	(United States) Forest Hill Convention, Fort Worth, Texas, U.S.	
1	Win	1–0	(United States) Edgar Verdin	UD	6	16 Aug 2014	(United States) Fairmont Hotel, Dallas, Texas, U.S.	

== Bare-knuckle boxing record ==
Professional record breakdown
4 matches	2 wins	2 losses
By knockout	2	2

Res.	Record	Opponent	Method	Event	Date	Round	Time	Location	Notes
Loss	2–2	Leonardo Perdomo	TKO (punches)	BKFC 87	March 20, 2026	1	1:07	Hollywood, Florida, United States	
Loss	2–1	DJ Linderman	KO (punches)	BYB 21 Fall Brawl	October 21, 2023	1	2:35	Rock Hill, South Carolina, United States	For the BYB Heavyweight Championship.
Win	2–0	Jordan Mitchell	TKO (punches)	BYB 17 Brawl at Rock Hill	May 13, 2023	1	1:41	Rock Hill, South Carolina, United States	
Win	1–0	Quentin Domingos	TKO	BYB 16 Dubai Brawl	March 18, 2023	1	1:22	Dubai, United Arab Emirates	

== See also ==
- List of male mixed martial artists
- List of current UFC fighters
