= Chris de la Rocha =

American mixed martial arts fighter

- Born: 15 May 1979 (age 47); San Jose, California, United States
- Height: 6 ft 4 in (1.93 m)
- Weight: 110 kg (243 lb; 17 st 5 lb)
- Division: Heavyweight
- Reach: 80 in (203 cm)
- Fighting out of: Washougal, Washington, United States
- Rank: Brown belt in Brazilian Jiu Jitsu
- Years active: 2013–present

Mixed martial arts record
- Total: 8
- Wins: 5
- By knockout: 3
- By submission: 2
- Losses: 3
- By knockout: 3

Other information
- Occupation: Washington State correctional officer
- Mixed martial arts record from Sherdog

Chris de la Rocha (born May 15, 1979) is an American mixed martial artist who competes in the Heavyweight division. He most notably fought in the Ultimate Fighting Championship.

== Background ==
De La Rocha was born in San Jose, California, United States. He started his MMA journey from a young age training in Jiu Jitsu where he won multiple grappling competitions. He started training in boxing in 2010 and went on to compete in the 2010 Western States Police and Fire Games where he won the Boxing gold medal. With that win, he decided to transitional to compete in mixed martial arts.

== Mixed martial arts career ==
=== Early career ===
De La Rocha made his professional debut in 2013 under Prime Fighting and defeated Matt Howell via knockout in the first round. After four fight winning streak He was signed by UFC with a record of 4–0.

=== Ultimate Fighting Championship ===
De La Rocha made his promotional debut on July 18, 2015, at UFC Fight Night: Bisping vs. Leites against Daniel Omielanczuk replacing Konstantin Erokhin. He lost the fight via technical knockout in first round.

His second fight came on May 29, 2016, at UFC Fight Night: Almeida vs. Garbrandt against Adam Milstead. He lost the fight via technical knockout in the second round.

After a hiatus of 18 months, suffering from a bicep injury, Rocha returned to face Rashad Coulter on June 9, 2018, at UFC 225, replacing Allen Crowder. He won the fight via technical knockout in round two.

De La Rocha faced Juan Adams on December 15, 2018, at UFC on Fox 31. He lost the fight via technical knockout in the third round.

In February 2021, it was reported that Chris and UFC had parted ways.

== Personal life ==
Rocha is a Washington State correctional officer.

== Mixed martial arts record ==
Professional record breakdown
8 matches	5 wins	3 losses
By knockout	3	3
By submission	2	0

Res.	Record	Opponent	Method	Event	Date	Round	Time	Location	Notes
Loss	5–3	Juan Adams	TKO (punches)	UFC on Fox: Lee vs. Iaquinta 2	15 December 2018	3	0:58	Milwaukee, Wisconsin, United States	
Win	5–2	Rashad Coulter	TKO (punches)	UFC 225	9 June 2018	2	3:53	Chicago, Illinois, United States	
Loss	4–2	Adam Milstead	TKO (punches)	UFC Fight Night: Almeida vs. Garbrandt	29 May 2016	2	4:01	Las Vegas, Nevada, United States	
Loss	4–1	Daniel Omielańczuk	TKO (punches)	UFC Fight Night: Bisping vs. Leites	18 July 2015	1	0:48	Glasgow, Scotland	
Win	4–0	Matt Kovacs	Submission (rear-naked choke)	Prime Fighting 5	14 March 2015	1	2:34	Ridgefield, Washington, United States	
Win	3–0	D.J. Linderman	TKO (punches)	WFC 25: Brawl at the Beach	26 July 2014	1	3:26	Lincoln City, Oregon, United States	
Win	2–0	Richard Foster	Submission (armbar)	Prime Fighting	8 March 2014	2	3:33	Ridgefield, Washington, United States	
Win	1–0	Matt Howell	KO (punch)	Prime Fighting	28 September 2013	1	2:22	Ridgefield, Washington, United States	

== See also ==
- List of male mixed martial artists
