= Mike Jackson (fighter) =

American mixed martial arts fighter

- Born: March 22, 1985 (age 41); Houston, Texas, United States
- Other names: The Truth
- Height: 6 ft 2 in (1.88 m)
- Weight: 170 lb (77 kg; 12 st 2 lb)
- Division: Welterweight
- Reach: 74 in (188 cm)
- Stance: Orthodox
- Fighting out of: Houston, Texas
- Team: 4oz. Fight Club
- Years active: 2016–present

Professional boxing record
- Total: 4
- Wins: 4
- By knockout: 4

Kickboxing record
- Total: 2
- Wins: 1
- By knockout: 1
- Losses: 1

Mixed martial arts record
- Total: 5
- Wins: 2
- By knockout: 1
- By disqualification: 1
- Losses: 2
- By knockout: 1
- By submission: 1
- No contests: 1

Amateur record
- Total: 1
- Wins: 0
- Losses: 1
- By decision: 1

Other information
- Boxing record from BoxRec
- Mixed martial arts record from Sherdog

Mike Jackson (born March 22, 1985) is an American mixed martial artist. Jackson competed in the Welterweight division of the Ultimate Fighting Championship (UFC).

== Background ==
Jackson met current UFC matchmaker Mick Maynard, when he was still president of Houston-based promotion Legacy FC, in 2008 while working a part time job delivering newspapers for Maynard's print publication, Maroon Weekly. This friendship would eventually lead to Jackson working as a photographer for Maynard at Legacy FC and produced online content around the events.

== Mixed martial arts career ==
=== Early career ===
Jackson made his amateur debut under the Lonestar Beatdown banner in September, 2009. He lost the bout by unanimous decision. Jackson was also an amateur 2011 Golden Gloves Boxing champion.

=== Ultimate Fighting Championship ===
Jackson made his professional and promotional debut on February 6, 2016, at UFC Fight Night 82, where he faced fellow newcomer Mickey Gall. Jackson lost the fight by submission just 45 seconds into the first round.

He was expected to face Jacob Capelli at XKO 34 on January 28, 2017 but the bout was cancelled. Instead Jackson faced Bellator MMA fighter Jeremie Holloway in a Muay Thai bout. Jackson lost by unanimous decision.

He was expected to face Rafael Justino at LFA 18 on August 4, 2017, but the bout was cancelled.

Jackson next faced CM Punk at UFC 225 on June 9, 2018. Jackson dominated the largely uneventful fight, winning via unanimous decision. Three years after the bout, it was made public that the result was overturned to a no contest by IDFPR after Jackson tested positive for marijuana and was suspended for three months.

A welterweight bout between Jackson and Dean Barry was briefly linked to UFC on ESPN: Chiesa vs. Magny in January, but it was pulled due to undisclosed reasons. They were expected to meet at UFC on ESPN: Reyes vs. Procházka on May 1, 2021. However, in March, Barry revealed that he was not able to obtain a visa in time for the bout so it was pulled once again. The bout was then booked for the third time to take place at UFC Fight Night: Lemos vs. Andrade on April 23, 2022. Jackson won the fight via disqualification in the first round after being rendered unable to continue due to an intentional eye gouge.

Jackson faced Pete Rodriguez on October 15, 2022, at UFC Fight Night 212. He lost the fight via knockout in round one.

On January 9, 2023, it was announced that Jackson was released from the UFC, despite having one bout left on his contract.

=== Post-UFC career ===
In his first bout outside the UFC, Jackson faced the inaugural UFC Welterweight Champion, and Hall of Famer Pat Miletich on October 14, 2023 at Caged Aggression 36. Despite suffering an early knockdown, Jackson won the fight via corner stoppage following the end of the second round.

== Controversies ==
Jackson, who has the words "Black Power" tattooed on his chest, was involved in an altercation with Jake Shields in December 2022 due to Jackson's tweets, which Shields described as racist and anti-white.

== Further career ==
He is also a professional kickboxer with a record of 1–1 and a professional boxer with a record of 4–0.

He is a photographer and videographer for mixed martial arts promotion Legacy Fighting Alliance.

== Mixed martial arts record ==
Professional record breakdown
5 matches	2 wins	2 losses
By knockout	1	1
By submission	0	1
By disqualification	1	0
No contests	1	

Res.	Record	Opponent	Method	Event	Date	Round	Time	Location	Notes
Win	2–2 (1)	Pat Miletich	TKO (retirement)	Caged Aggression 36	October 14, 2023	2	5:00	Davenport, Iowa, United States	
Loss	1–2 (1)	Pete Rodriguez	KO (punches and knee)	UFC Fight Night: Grasso vs. Araújo	October 15, 2022	1	1:33	Las Vegas, Nevada, United States	
Win	1–1 (1)	Dean Barry	DQ (eye gouging)	UFC Fight Night: Lemos vs. Andrade	April 23, 2022	1	3:52	Las Vegas, Nevada, United States	
NC	0–1 (1)	CM Punk	NC (overturned)	UFC 225	June 9, 2018	3	5:00	Chicago, Illinois, United States	Originally a unanimous decision win for Jackson; overturned in 2021 after he tested positive for marijuana.
Loss	0–1	Mickey Gall	Submission (rear-naked choke)	UFC Fight Night: Hendricks vs. Thompson	February 6, 2016	1	0:45	Las Vegas, Nevada, United States	Welterweight debut.

== Professional boxing record ==
4 fights	4 wins	0 losses
By knockout	4	0

No.	Result	Record	Opponent	Type	Round, time	Date	Location	Notes
4	Win	4–0	(United States) Johnathan Taylor	KO	3 (4), 0:52	15 September 2017	(United States) Greenspoint Mall, Houston, Texas, US	
3	Win	3–0	(United States) Clarence Brown	TKO	2 (4), 1:17	18 June 2016	(United States) Arabia Shrine Center, Houston, Texas, US	
2	Win	2–0	(United States) Sean Douglas	KO	2 (4), 2:18	16 August 2014	(United States) Fairmont Hotel, Dallas, Texas, US	
1	Win	1–0	(United States) Mike Green	KO	2 (4), 1:13	30 March 2013	(United States) Cobra Boxing Gym, Galveston, Texas, US	

== See also ==
- List of male mixed martial artists
