= Khadis Ibragimov =

Russian mixed martial arts fighter

- Born: Хадис Баширович Ибрагимов; May 21, 1995 (age 31); Shamilsky District, Dagestan, Russia
- Height: 6 ft 2 in (188 cm)
- Weight: 206 lb (93 kg; 14 st 10 lb)
- Division: Light heavyweight Heavyweight
- Reach: 78 in (198 cm)
- Style: Combat Sambo
- Fighting out of: Saint Petersburg, Russia
- Team: Sambo-Piter
- Years active: 2017–present

Mixed martial arts record
- Total: 19
- Wins: 11
- By knockout: 3
- By submission: 3
- By decision: 4
- By disqualification: 1
- Losses: 8
- By knockout: 3
- By submission: 1
- By decision: 4

Other information
- Mixed martial arts record from Sherdog

Khadis Ibragimov (born May 21, 1995) is a Russian mixed martial artist and sambo practitioner. A professional competitor since 2017, he has also formerly competed for Ultimate Fighting Championship and M-1 Global where he was the Light heavyweight Champion. Twice European Combat Sambo champion.

== Background ==
A native of Dagestan, Khadis Ibragimov first came to the sports section at the age of 17, deciding to try his hand at boxing (during his school years, Hadis studied hard, was an excellent student, repeatedly won Olympiads in physics and mathematics and graduated from school with a gold medal).A typical "nerd", Ibragimov unexpectedly discovered a serious aptitude for combat sports and continued to pursue martial arts upon becoming a cadet at the Mikhailovskaya Military Artillery Academy. There, he honed his skills in army hand-to-hand combat and combat sambo.

At the age of 20, he won a silver medal at the Russian Combat Sambo Championship, got into the national team and won the 2016 European Championship, after which he was forced to take a year-long break due to knee surgery (rupture of the cruciate ligaments). After recovery, Ibragimov decided to leave the army after serving two years as a lieutenant and continued his mixed martial arts career.

== Mixed martial arts career ==
=== M-1 Global ===
Khadis Ibragimov made his professional MMA debut in the light heavyweight division on May 25, 2017, in St. Petersburg, at the Suvorov Fighting Championship tournament, where he defeated Mukhamedali Shokirov by technical knockout in less than 2 minutes. In the same year, Ibragimov had three more bouts at regional events in St. Petersburg, winning all three (two by unanimous decision and one by submission).

In February 2018, Ibragimov stepped in on short notice to fight German fighter Stefan Pütz. Ibragimov won the fight by third-round submission via bulldog choke.

After winning his next fight against Gigi Kukhalashvili, Ibragimov challenged Dmitry Mikutsa for the M-1 Global Light Heavyweight Championship. At M-1 Challenge 96 on August 25, 2018, Ibragimov finished Mikutsa by second-round rear naked choke to win the title.

He successfully defended the title in March 2019, defeating Rafał Kijańczuk from Poland by first-round technical knockout.

=== Ultimate Fighting Championship ===
Ibragimov made his UFC debut against fellow newcomer Jung Da Un on August 31, 2019. He lost the fight via standing guillotine in the third round.

Ibragimov next made a short notice replacement against Ed Herman. He lost the fight via unanimous decision.

A bout between Ibragimov and Roman Dolidze was initially scheduled for the promotion's inaugural event in Kazakhstan planned a month prior. However, the fight was postponed after the card was moved to Las Vegas due to travel restrictions for both participants related to the COVID-19 pandemic. The pairing was left intact and eventually took place on July 19, 2020, at UFC Fight Night: Figueiredo vs. Benavidez 2. Ibragimov lost the fight via technical knockout in round one.

Ibragimov faced promotional newcomer Danilo Marques on September 27, 2020, at UFC 253. He lost the fight via unanimous decision.

On October 2, 2020, it was reported Ibragimov was released by UFC.

=== Hardcore FC ===
After going winless in the UFC, Khadis Ibragimov returned to Russia, where he joined the newly-founded Russian promotion Hardcore FC.

On September 2, 2021, Ibragimov defeated Islam Zhangorazov by first-round technical knockout.

On October 14, 2021, Ibragimov moved up to heavyweight defeated Dmitry Andryushko by first-round technical knockout.

On November 18, 2021, he defeated Denis Polekhin via a 9-second knockout.

==== HFC Heavyweight Champion ====
On December 23, 2021, Khadis Ibragimov defeated Hussein Adamov by unanimous decision to win the HFC Heavyweight Championship.

He defended the title twice, defeating Abdulbasir Vagabov by second-round submission at Hardcore FC 38 on August 18, 2022, and then knocking out Fernando Rodrigues Jr. in the first round at Hardcore FC 62 on May 19, 2023.

== Championships and accomplishments ==
=== Mixed martial arts ===
- Hardcore Fighting Championship
  - HFC Heavyweight Championship (One time, two defenses)
- M-1 Global
  - M-1 Global Light Heavyweight Champion (Two times)

=== Combat Sambo ===
- 2016 European Championships - 1st (90 kg, Kazan)
- 2019 European Championships - 1st (100 kg, Gijón)

== Mixed martial arts record ==
Professional record breakdown
19 matches	11 wins	8 losses
By knockout	3	3
By submission	3	1
By decision	4	4
By disqualification	1	0

Res.	Record	Opponent	Method	Event	Date	Round	Time	Location	Notes
Loss	11–8	Kirill Kornilov	TKO (retirement)	ACA 207	September 12, 2026	2	5:00	Krasnodar, Russia	
Loss	11–7	Evgeniy Goncharov	Decision (unanimous)	ACA 204	June 19, 2026	3	5:00	Omsk, Russia	
Win	11–6	Daniil Matsola	KO (punches)	ACA 202	April 12, 2026	1	1:00	Saint Petersburg, Russia	Performance of the Night.
Win	10–6	Viktor Nemkov	Decision (unanimous)	Sokol 2	November 28, 2025	3	5:00	Moscow, Russia	
Loss	9–6	Shamsutdin Makhmudov	Decision (split)	Nashe Delo 87	February 28, 2025	5	5:00	Kazan, Russia	Lost the Nashe Delo Heavyweight Championship.
Win	9–5	Viktor Nemkov	Decision (split)	Nashe Delo 86	December 6, 2024	5	5:00	Saint Petersburg, Russia	Return to Heavyweight. Won the Nashe Delo Heavyweight Championship.
Loss	8–5	Ivan Shtyrkov	TKO (punches)	RCC 20	October 18, 2024	3	1:43	Yekaterinburg, Russia	Catchweight (220 lb) bout.
Loss	8–4	Danilo Marques	Decision (unanimous)	UFC 253	September 27, 2020	3	5:00	Abu Dhabi, United Arab Emirates	
Loss	8–3	Roman Dolidze	TKO (knee and punches)	UFC Fight Night: Figueiredo vs. Benavidez 2	July 18, 2020	1	4:15	Abu Dhabi, United Arab Emirates	
Loss	8–2	Ed Herman	Decision (unanimous)	UFC Fight Night: Magomedsharipov vs. Kattar	November 9, 2019	3	5:00	Moscow, Russia	
Loss	8–1	Jung Da-un	Submission (guillotine choke)	UFC Fight Night: Andrade vs. Zhang	August 31, 2019	3	2:00	Shenzhen, China	
Win	8–0	Rafał Kijańczuk	TKO (punches)	M-1 Challenge 101	March 30, 2019	1	2:30	Almaty, Kazakhstan	Defended the M-1 Global Light Heavyweight Championship.
Win	7–0	Dmitriy Mikutsa	Submission (rear-naked choke)	M-1 Challenge 96	August 25, 2018	2	4:30	Saint Petersburg, Russia	Won the vacant M-1 Global Light Heavyweight Championship.
Win	6–0	Giga Kukhalashvili	DQ (rope grabbing)	M-1 Challenge 92	May 24, 2018	3	3:27	Saint Petersburg, Russia	
Win	5–0	Stephan Puetz	Submission (bulldog choke)	M-1 Challenge 88	February 22, 2018	3	2:12	Moscow, Russia	Return to Light Heavyweight.
Win	4–0	Ullubiy Pakhrutdinov	Submission (rear-naked choke)	Northwest League of Combat Sambo: Road to China 3	October 5, 2017	1	1:33	Saint Petersburg, Russia	Heavyweight debut.
Win	3–0	Dmitriy Shumilov	Decision (unanimous)	Olympic Platform Foundation: Friendship of Peoples Grand Prix 2017	June 12, 2017	2	5:00	Saint Petersburg, Russia	
Win	2–0	Vladimir Trusov	Decision (unanimous)	Olympic Platform Foundation: Friendship of Peoples Grand Prix 2017	June 12, 2017	2	5:00	Saint Petersburg, Russia	
Win	1–0	Mukhammedali Shokirov	TKO	Suvorov FC 1	May 25, 2017	1	1:23	Saint Petersburg, Russia	Light Heavyweight debut.

== See also ==
- List of male mixed martial artists
