= UFC Fight Night: de Randamie vs. Ladd =

UFC mixed martial arts event in 2019

- The poster for UFC Fight Night: de Randamie vs. Ladd
- Promotion: Ultimate Fighting Championship
- Date: July 13, 2019
- Venue: Golden 1 Center
- City: Sacramento, California
- Attendance: 10,306
- Total gate: $938,734.17

Event chronology
UFC 239: Jones vs. Santos	UFC Fight Night: de Randamie vs. Ladd	UFC on ESPN: dos Anjos vs. Edwards

UFC Fight Night: de Randamie vs. Ladd (also known as UFC Fight Night 155 or UFC on ESPN+ 13) was a mixed martial arts event produced by the Ultimate Fighting Championship that was held on July 13, 2019 at the Golden 1 Center in Sacramento, California.

== Background ==
A women's bantamweight bout between the inaugural UFC Women's Featherweight Champion Germaine de Randamie and Aspen Ladd served as the event headliner.

The event marked the return of former WEC Featherweight Champion, former UFC Bantamweight Championship challenger and 2017 UFC Hall of Fame inductee Urijah Faber who returned to action 30 months after announcing his retirement, to fight in his hometown. He faced Ricky Simón in a bantamweight bout.

A women's strawweight bout between Cynthia Calvillo and former Invicta FC Strawweight Champion Lívia Renata Souza was scheduled for this event. However it was reported on June 7, that Calvillo broke her foot and was forced to pull out of the bout. Souza instead faced fellow former Invicta FC Strawweight champion Brianna Van Buren.

A middleweight bout between Karl Roberson and John Phillips was scheduled for this event. However on June 14, it was reported that Phillips was pulled from the bout due to injury and he was replaced by promotional newcomer Wellington Turman.

A bantamweight bout between 2004 Olympic silver medalist in wrestling and former UFC Women's Bantamweight Championship challenger Sara McMann and inaugural UFC Women's Flyweight Champion Nicco Montaño (also The Ultimate Fighter: A New World Champion flyweight winner) was scheduled for this event. However, it was reported on June 19, that McMann pulled out of the bout citing an injury and she was replaced by The Ultimate Fighter: Team Rousey vs. Team Tate bantamweight winner Julianna Peña.

Martin Day was expected to face Benito Lopez at the event. However on June 24, Day pulled out of the bout due to a knee surgery and was replaced by Vince Morales.

Gian Villante was expected to face Mike Rodríguez at the event. However, Villante pulled out on July 4 due to undisclosed reasons. He was replaced by promotional newcomer John Allan.

Beneil Dariush was expected to face Drakkar Klose at the event. However on July 7, Dariush pulled out due to an injury. As a result, UFC officials removed Klose from the card and he is expected to be scheduled for a future event instead.

== Results ==
Main card (ESPN+)
Weight class				Method	Round	Time	Notes
Women's Bantamweight	Germaine de Randamie	def.	Aspen Ladd	TKO (punch)	1	0:16
Bantamweight	Urijah Faber	def.	Ricky Simón	TKO (punches)	1	0:46
Featherweight	Josh Emmett	def.	Mirsad Bektić	TKO (punches)	1	4:25
Middleweight	Karl Roberson	def.	Wellington Turman	Decision (split) (28–29, 29–28, 29–28)	3	5:00
Middleweight	Marvin Vettori	def.	Cezar Ferreira	Decision (unanimous) (30–27, 30–27, 30–27)	3	5:00
Preliminary card (ESPN+)
Light Heavyweight	John Allan	vs.	Mike Rodríguez	No Contest (overturned)	3	5:00	(Note: Originally a unanimous decision (29–28, 29–28, 30–27) win for Allan; overturned after he was tested positive for banned hormone and metabolic modulator tamoxifen where he received one year USADA suspension and fined $4,800 by the California State Athletic Commission.)
Featherweight	Andre Fili	def.	Sheymon Moraes	KO (punches)	1	3:07
Women's Bantamweight	Julianna Peña	def.	Nicco Montaño	Decision (unanimous) (29–28, 29–28, 29–27)	3	5:00
Featherweight	Ryan Hall	def.	Darren Elkins	Decision (unanimous) (29–28, 29–28, 30–27)	3	5:00
Bantamweight	Jonathan Martinez	def.	Liu Pingyuan	KO (knee)	3	3:54
Women's Strawweight	Brianna Van Buren	def.	Lívia Renata Souza	Decision (unanimous) (30–27, 30–27, 30–27)	3	5:00
Bantamweight	Benito Lopez	def.	Vince Morales	Decision (unanimous) (29–28, 29–28, 29–28)	3	5:00

== Bonus awards ==
The following fighters received $50,000 bonuses:

- Fight of the Night: No bonus awarded.
- Performance of the Night: Urijah Faber, Josh Emmett, Andre Fili and Jonathan Martinez

== Reported payout ==
The following is the reported payout to the fighters as reported to the California State Athletic Commission. It does not include sponsor money and also does not include the UFC's traditional "fight night" bonuses. The total disclosed payout for the event was $1,274,000.

- Germaine de Randamie: $90,000 (includes $45,000 win bonus) def. Aspen Ladd: $35,000
- Urijah Faber: $340,000 (includes $170,000 win bonus) def. Ricky Simón: $23,000
- Josh Emmett: $98,000 (includes $49,000 win bonus) def. Mirsad Bektić: $38,000
- Karl Roberson: $50,000 (includes $25,000 win bonus) def. Wellington Turman: $12,000
- Marvin Vettori: $40,000 (includes $20,000 win bonus) def. Cezar Ferreira: $45,000
- John Allan: $24,000 (includes $12,000 win bonus) def. Mike Rodríguez: $20,000
- Andre Fili: $80,000 (includes $40,000 win bonus) def. Sheymon Moraes: $21,000
- Julianna Peña: $80,000 (includes $40,000 win bonus) def. Nicco Montaño: $30,000
- Ryan Hall: $70,000 (includes $35,000 win bonus) def. Darren Elkins: $62,000
- Jonathan Martinez: $28,000 (includes $14,000 win bonus) def. Pingyuan Liu: $14,000
- Briana Van Buren: $24,000 (includes $12,000 win bonus) def. Lívia Renata Souza: $12,000
- Benito Lopez: $24,000 (includes $12,000 win bonus) def. Vince Morales: $14,000

== Aftermath ==
On August 13, 2019, it was announced by the California State Athletic Commission that John Allan tested positive for tamoxifen in a fight night test. He faced a one-year suspension, fines, and the reversal of his decision win against Mike Rodríguez to a no contest.

== See also ==
- List of UFC events
- 2019 in UFC
- List of current UFC fighters
