= Da Woon Jung =

South Korean mixed martial arts fighter

- Born: Jung Da-Woon; 7 December 1993 (age 32); Taegu, South Korea
- Other names: Sseda
- Height: 6 ft 3 in (1.91 m)
- Weight: 205 lb (93 kg; 14 st 9 lb)
- Division: Light heavyweight (2016–present); Heavyweight (2015–2016; 2017)
- Reach: 78.5 in (199 cm)
- Stance: Orthodox
- Fighting out of: Seoul, South Korea
- Team: Korean Top Team
- Rank: Blue belt in Brazilian Jiu-Jitsu
- Years active: 2015–present

Mixed martial arts record
- Total: 23
- Wins: 15
- By knockout: 11
- By submission: 2
- By decision: 2
- Losses: 7
- By knockout: 2
- By submission: 2
- By decision: 3
- Draws: 1

Other information
- Mixed martial arts record from Sherdog

Jung Da-Woon (Korean: 정다운; born 7 December 1993), anglicized as Da Woon Jung, is a South Korean professional mixed martial artist who competed in the Light Heavyweight division of the Ultimate Fighting Championship (UFC). A professional competitor since 2015, he has also formerly competed for HEAT where he was the Light heavyweight Champion.

== Mixed martial arts career ==
=== Early career ===
Starting his career in 2015, Jung compiled a 11–2 record fighting for various East Asian regional promotions, with his most memorable accomplishment being winning the HEAT Light Heavyweight Championship via TKO against Yuto Nakajima.

=== Ultimate Fighting Championship ===
Jung made his UFC debut against fellow newcomer Khadis Ibragimov on August 31, 2019, at UFC Fight Night 157. He won the fight via standing guillotine in the third round.

Jung faced Mike Rodríguez on December 21, 2019, at UFC Fight Night 165. He won the fight via knockout in the first round.

Da Un Jung was scheduled to face Ed Herman on May 2, 2020, at UFC Fight Night: Hermansson vs. Weidman. However, on April 9, Dana White, the president of UFC announced that the event was postponed to a future date. The bout with Herman was rescheduled for August 1, 2020, at UFC Fight Night 175. However, Jung was removed from the bout on July 23 due to alleged travel restrictions related to the COVID-19 pandemic.

Jung faced Sam Alvey on October 24, 2020, at UFC 254. After a back and forth battle, the fight was declared a draw. 17 out of 21 media outlets scored the bout for Alvey.

As the first bout of his new contract, Jung was scheduled to face Shamil Gamzatov on April 10, 2021, at UFC on ABC 2. However, Gamzatov was removed from the bout on March 24 due to alleged Visa issues and replaced by William Knight. Jung won the bout via unanimous decision.

Jung was scheduled to face Kennedy Nzechukwu on October 16, 2021, at UFC Fight Night 195. However, the bout was postponed to UFC Fight Night 197 on November 13, 2021, for unknown reasons. Jung won the bout via knockout in round one.

Jung faced Dustin Jacoby on July 16, 2022, at UFC on ABC 3. He lost the fight via knockout in the first round.

Jung faced Devin Clark on February 4, 2023, at UFC Fight Night 218. He lost the fight via unanimous decision.

Jung faced Carlos Ulberg on September 10, 2023, at UFC 293. He lost the fight in round three via rear-naked choke.

Jung faced Oumar Sy on September 28, 2024 at UFC Fight Night 243. He lost the fight by unanimous decision.

On October 8, 2024, following his loss, it was reported that Jung was removed from the UFC roster.

=== Post UFC ===
On December 21, 2024, it was reported that Jung had signed with Global Fight League.

Jung was scheduled to face Ronny Markes on May 25, 2025 at GFL 2. However, all GFL events were cancelled indefinitely.

== Championships and accomplishments ==
- HEAT
  - HEAT Light Heavyweight Championship (one time)

== Mixed martial arts record ==
Professional record breakdown
23 matches	15 wins	7 losses
By knockout	11	2
By submission	2	2
By decision	2	3
Draws	1	

Res.	Record	Opponent	Method	Event	Date	Round	Time	Location	Notes
Loss	15–7–1	Mickaël Groguhe	TKO (punches)	Top FC 22	July 11, 2026	3	3:32	Gimpo, South Korea	Return to Heavyweight.
Loss	15–6–1	Oumar Sy	Decision (unanimous)	UFC Fight Night: Moicano vs. Saint Denis	September 28, 2024	3	5:00	Paris, France	
Loss	15–5–1	Carlos Ulberg	Submission (rear-naked choke)	UFC 293	September 10, 2023	3	4:49	Sydney, Australia	
Loss	15–4–1	Devin Clark	Decision (unanimous)	UFC Fight Night: Lewis vs. Spivac	February 4, 2023	3	5:00	Las Vegas, Nevada, United States	
Loss	15–3–1	Dustin Jacoby	KO (punch)	UFC on ABC: Ortega vs. Rodríguez	July 16, 2022	1	3:13	Elmont, New York, United States	
Win	15–2–1	Kennedy Nzechukwu	KO (elbows)	UFC Fight Night: Holloway vs. Rodríguez	November 13, 2021	1	3:04	Las Vegas, Nevada, United States	
Win	14–2–1	William Knight	Decision (unanimous)	UFC on ABC: Vettori vs. Holland	April 10, 2021	3	5:00	Las Vegas, Nevada, United States	
Draw	13–2–1	Sam Alvey	Draw (split)	UFC 254	October 24, 2020	3	5:00	Abu Dhabi, United Arab Emirates	
Win	13–2	Mike Rodríguez	KO (punches)	UFC Fight Night: Edgar vs. The Korean Zombie	December 21, 2019	1	1:04	Busan, South Korea	
Win	12–2	Khadis Ibragimov	Submission (guillotine choke)	UFC Fight Night: Andrade vs. Zhang	August 31, 2019	3	2:00	Shenzhen, China	
Win	11–2	Saša Milinkovic	TKO (elbows)	HEAT 44	March 2, 2019	3	0:58	Nagoya, Japan	Heavyweight bout.
Win	10–2	Abutalib Halilov	TKO (elbows)	Way of the Dragon 3	January 12, 2019	2	3:10	Taipei City, Taiwan	
Win	9–2	Yuto Nakajima	TKO (punches)	HEAT 43	September 17, 2018	2	1:33	Kariya, Japan	Won the HEAT Light Heavyweight Championship.
Win	8–2	Peterson Almeida	TKO (punches and elbows)	HEAT 42	May 27, 2018	2	3:55	Kariya, Japan	
Win	7–2	Hulk	KO (punches)	HEAT 41	December 23, 2017	1	2:20	Nagoya, Japan	Heavyweight bout.
Win	6–2	Ryo Sakai	Decision (unanimous)	TFC 15	July 22, 2017	3	5:00	Seoul, South Korea	
Win	5–2	Lee Hyun-soo	TKO (punches)	TFC Dream 2	January 21, 2017	1	1:54	Gyeongsan, South Korea	Catchweight (220 lb) bout.
Win	4–2	Shunsuke Inoue	TKO (punches)	HEAT 38	September 25, 2016	2	3:26	Nagoya, Japan	
Win	3–2	Handong Kong	Submission (arm triangle choke)	Art of War 18	July 30, 2016	1	7:30	Beijing, China	Light Heavyweight debut.
Win	2–2	Lucas Tani	TKO (punches)	HEAT 37	March 6, 2016	3	2:24	Nagoya, Japan	Openweight bout.
Loss	1–2	Roque Martinez	Submission (kimura)	Top FC 9	October 24, 2015	1	4:30	Incheon, South Korea	
Loss	1–1	Lim Jun-soo	Decision (majority)	Top FC 8	August 15, 2015	3	5:00	Seoul, South Korea	
Win	1–0	Lee Hyung-chul	TKO (punches)	Top FC 7	May 29, 2015	1	1:45	Changwon, South Korea	Heavyweight debut.

== Filmography ==
=== Television show ===
Year	Title	Role	Notes	Ref.
2022	The King of Ssireum	Contestant	spin-off	

== See also ==
- List of male mixed martial artists
