= Devin Clark (fighter) =

American mixed martial arts fighter

- Born: April 12, 1990 (age 36); Sioux Falls, South Dakota, U.S.
- Other names: Brown Bear
- Height: 6 ft 0 in (1.83 m)
- Weight: 205 lb (93 kg; 14.6 st)
- Division: Heavyweight; Light Heavyweight; Middleweight
- Reach: 75 in (191 cm)
- Style: Wrestling
- Fighting out of: Sioux Falls, South Dakota, U.S.
- Team: Team Nak Suk (until 2010); Next Edge Academy of Martial Arts (2010–2017); Jackson-Wink MMA (2017–present)
- Trainer: Bruce Hoyer
- Wrestling: NJCAA Wrestling
- Years active: 2013–present

Mixed martial arts record
- Total: 24
- Wins: 14
- By knockout: 4
- By submission: 1
- By decision: 9
- Losses: 10
- By knockout: 3
- By submission: 4
- By decision: 3

Other information
- Mixed martial arts record from Sherdog

Devin Clark (born April 12, 1990) is an American professional mixed martial artist who competed in the Light Heavyweight division of the Ultimate Fighting Championship (UFC). A professional competitor since 2013, he was signed by the UFC after Dana White scouted him on the "Dana White: Looking for a Fight - Season 1 Episode 6" UFC web series.

== Background ==
Clark was born in Sioux Falls, South Dakota in 1990. He started boxing as a child and wrestling at the age of seven, continuing to compete in the latter in high school. He started coming into his own as a junior in high school, where in the state finals match, he lost to former UFC athlete David Michaud. The following year, his senior year, he became the South Dakota State Champion at 189 lbs. Clark attended Rochester Community and Technical College where he was a two-time NJCAA All-American at the 184-pounds division for the Yellowjackets. He won the National Championship in 2009, and placed 4th in 2010.

Despite eventually dropping out of college, Clark wasn't ready to stop competing as a martial artist, so Clark started MMA training at his local gym, Team Nak Suk, and later moved to Next Edge Academy under the tutelage of BJJ black belt Bruce Hoyer. He quickly moved up and competed in the Resurrection Fighting Alliance. He was a high school state wrestling champion, Junior College National wrestling champion, and an amateur boxer.

== Mixed martial arts career ==
=== Early career ===
Clark started his professional MMA career on August 24, 2013, and made his debut in Knockout Events: Battle at the Chip. He had his first win over Jeremy Spelts via TKO (punches) on round one.

One year later, after his first professional win, he made a move to compete in Resurrection Fighting Alliance 17 on August 22, 2014. He faced Aaron Brown and secured a win via TKO (punches) on round two.

On February 7, 2015, Clark joined Total Fight Challenge promotion for his third fight and faced William Vincent. He secured a win via submission (rear-naked choke).

Clark returned to Resurrection Fighting Alliance promotion (RFA). He faced Jaquis William on RFA 25 on April 10, 2015, outworked William and won the fight via unanimous decision.

Clark faced Dervin Lopez on RFA 29: USA vs Brazil on August 21, 2015. He won the fight via unanimous decision.

On April 15, 2016 Dana White, Matt Serra and Robbie Lawler attended Resurrection Fighting Alliance 39 event at Sioux Falls, South Dakota for "Dana White Looking For a Fighter", a UFC web series program, where Clark faced Rafael Viana for the Light heavyweight Championship. The fight was scheduled for 5 rounds and after the second round, Viana suffered a broken hand which kept him from continuing in the fight. Clark was declared the new champion. White was impressed with Clark's performance on the night and with his MMA record of 6-0-0, White signed him up into the UFC roster.

=== Ultimate Fighting Championship ===
Clark made his UFC debut against Alex Nicholson in a Middleweight bout on July 13, 2016, at UFC Fight Night 91. He lost the fight via knockout in the first round.

Clark, replacing Jake Collier, moved back to the Light Heavyweight division and faced Josh Stansbury on December 3, 2016, at The Ultimate Fighter 24 Finale. He won the fight via unanimous decision.

Clark next faced Jake Collier on April 15, 2017, at UFC on Fox 24. He won the fight via unanimous decision. In post fight interviews, Clark admitted that he was disappointed in his performance as he stated he missed opportunities to finish the fight.

Clark faced Jan Błachowicz on October 21, 2017, at UFC Fight Night 118. He lost the fight via rear-naked choke submission in the second round.

Clark faced Mike Rodríguez on April 7, 2018, at UFC 223. He won the fight by unanimous decision.

Clark faced Aleksandar Rakić on December 8, 2018, at UFC 231. He lost the fight via TKO in the first round.

Clark was expected to face Abdul-Kerim Edilov on April 20, 2019, at UFC Fight Night 149. However, Edilov's removal from the card for undisclosed reasons was announced on 25 March and he was replaced by Ivan Shtyrkov. However, on April 20, 2019, it was reported that the bout was cancelled after Shtyrkov was hospitalized.

Soon after the previous fight was canceled, it was announced that Clark would face Darko Stošić at UFC Fight Night: Gustafsson vs. Smith on June 1, 2019. He won the fight via unanimous decision.

Clark faced Ryan Spann on October 12, 2019, at UFC Fight Night 161. He lost the fight via submission in round two.

Clark was scheduled to face Gadzhimurad Antigulov on February 15, 2020, at UFC Fight Night 167. However, Antigulov was pulled from the event for undisclosed reason and he was replaced by Dequan Townsend. He won the fight by unanimous decision.

Clark was scheduled to face Alonzo Menifield on May 2, 2020, at UFC Fight Night: Hermansson vs. Weidman. However, on April 9, Dana White, the president of UFC announced that this event was postponed and the bout took place on June 6, 2020, at UFC 250. Clark won the fight via unanimous decision.

Clark was briefly linked to a bout against Shamil Gamzatov on November 28, 2020, at UFC on ESPN 18. However, Gamzatov was removed from the bout in mid-October due to alleged visa issues. Clark faced Anthony Smith on the card as the main event after Curtis Blaydes had to pull out of his fight against Derrick Lewis due to a positive COVID test. He lost the fight via a triangle choke submission in the first round.

Clark was scheduled to face Ion Cuțelaba on May 1, 2021, at UFC on ESPN 23. However, Clark pulled out from the event, citing injury, and he was replaced by Dustin Jacoby. The bout eventually took place on September 18, 2021, at UFC Fight Night 192. After being knocked down in round one, he lost the fight via unanimous decision.

Clark faced William Knight on April 16, 2022, at UFC on ESPN 34. He won the fight via technical knockout in round three.

Clark faced Azamat Murzakanov on August 13, 2022, at UFC on ESPN 41. He lost the fight via technical knockout in round three.

Clark faced Da Un Jung on February 4, 2023, at UFC Fight Night 218. He won the fight via unanimous decision.

Clark faced Kennedy Nzechukwu on May 6, 2023, at UFC 288. He lost the bout via technical guillotine choke in second round.

Clark faced Marcin Prachnio on February 10, 2024, at UFC Fight Night 236. He lost the bout by unanimous decision.

On February 14, 2024, it was reported that Clark was removed from the UFC roster.

=== Global Fight League ===
Clark was scheduled to face former UFC Light Heavyweight Championship challenger Thiago Santos on May 25, 2025 at GFL 2. However, all GFL events were cancelled indefinitely.

== Championships and accomplishments ==
=== Mixed martial arts ===
- Resurrection Fighting Alliance
  - RFA Light Heavyweight Championship (one time)

== Personal life ==
When Clark was in high school at Lincoln, his two best friends gave him the moniker "Brown Bear", citing his dual personal characteristics - He has bear-like wrestling, and has a pleasant, thoughtful demeanor in everyday life. Clark is active in helping numerous non profit agencies in his community. He is especially involved in advocating for those that have Down syndrome and was recently appointed to the National Board of Garrett's Fight.

While training for his bout at UFC on Fox 24, Clark gained notice for advocating for Down syndrome awareness. Clark is very vocal in support of Down Syndrome Awareness and Advocacy, and the campaign to save the unborn Down syndrome child from abortion.

Clark and his wife have a daughter.

== Mixed martial arts record ==
Professional record breakdown
24 matches	14 wins	10 losses
By knockout	4	3
By submission	1	4
By decision	9	3

Res.	Record	Opponent	Method	Event	Date	Round	Time	Location	Notes
Loss	14–10	Bevon Lewis	Decision (split)	LFA 214	August 15, 2025	3	5:00	Sioux Falls, South Dakota, United States	Heavyweight bout.
Loss	14–9	Marcin Prachnio	Decision (unanimous)	UFC Fight Night: Hermansson vs. Pyfer	February 10, 2024	3	5:00	Las Vegas, Nevada, United States	
Loss	14–8	Kennedy Nzechukwu	Technical Submission (guillotine choke)	UFC 288	May 6, 2023	2	2:28	Newark, New Jersey, United States	
Win	14–7	Jung Da-un	Decision (unanimous)	UFC Fight Night: Lewis vs. Spivac	February 4, 2023	3	5:00	Las Vegas, Nevada, United States	
Loss	13–7	Azamat Murzakanov	TKO (punches)	UFC on ESPN: Vera vs. Cruz	August 13, 2022	3	1:18	San Diego, California, United States	Return to Light Heavyweight.
Win	13–6	William Knight	TKO (elbow and punches)	UFC on ESPN: Luque vs. Muhammad 2	April 16, 2022	3	3:21	Las Vegas, Nevada, United States	Heavyweight debut.
Loss	12–6	Ion Cuțelaba	Decision (unanimous)	UFC Fight Night: Smith vs. Spann	September 18, 2021	3	5:00	Las Vegas, Nevada, United States	
Loss	12–5	Anthony Smith	Submission (triangle choke)	UFC on ESPN: Smith vs. Clark	November 28, 2020	1	2:34	Las Vegas, Nevada, United States	
Win	12–4	Alonzo Menifield	Decision (unanimous)	UFC 250	June 6, 2020	3	5:00	Las Vegas, Nevada, United States	
Win	11–4	Dequan Townsend	Decision (unanimous)	UFC Fight Night: Anderson vs. Błachowicz 2	February 15, 2020	3	5:00	Rio Rancho, New Mexico, United States	
Loss	10–4	Ryan Spann	Submission (guillotine choke)	UFC Fight Night: Joanna vs. Waterson	October 12, 2019	2	2:01	Tampa, Florida, United States	
Win	10–3	Darko Stošić	Decision (unanimous)	UFC Fight Night: Gustafsson vs. Smith	June 1, 2019	3	5:00	Stockholm, Sweden	
Loss	9–3	Aleksandar Rakić	TKO (punches)	UFC 231	December 8, 2018	1	4:05	Toronto, Ontario, Canada	
Win	9–2	Mike Rodríguez	Decision (unanimous)	UFC 223	April 7, 2018	3	5:00	Brooklyn, New York, United States	
Loss	8–2	Jan Błachowicz	Submission (rear-naked choke)	UFC Fight Night: Cowboy vs. Till	October 21, 2017	2	3:02	Gdańsk, Poland	
Win	8–1	Jake Collier	Decision (unanimous)	UFC on Fox: Johnson vs. Reis	April 15, 2017	3	5:00	Kansas City, Missouri, United States	
Win	7–1	Josh Stansbury	Decision (unanimous)	The Ultimate Fighter: Tournament of Champions Finale	December 3, 2016	3	5:00	Las Vegas, Nevada, United States	Return to Light Heavyweight.
Loss	6–1	Alex Nicholson	KO (punch)	UFC Fight Night: McDonald vs. Lineker	July 13, 2016	1	4:57	Sioux Falls, South Dakota, United States	Middleweight debut.
Win	6–0	Rafael Viana	TKO (hand injury)	RFA 37	April 15, 2016	2	5:00	Sioux Falls, South Dakota, United States	Won the RFA Light Heavyweight Championship.
Win	5–0	Dervin Lopez	Decision (unanimous)	RFA 29	August 21, 2015	3	5:00	Sioux Falls, South Dakota, United States	
Win	4–0	Jaquis Williams	Decision (unanimous)	RFA 25	April 10, 2015	3	5:00	Sioux Falls, South Dakota, United States	
Win	3–0	William Vincent	Submission (rear-naked choke)	Total Fight Challenge: Cannon vs. Al-Ghoul	February 7, 2015	1	4:29	Willow Springs, Illinois, United States	
Win	2–0	Aaron Brown	TKO (punches)	RFA 17	August 22, 2014	2	4:02	Sioux Falls, South Dakota, United States	
Win	1–0	Jeremy Spelts	TKO (punches)	Knockout Events: Battle at the Chip	August 4, 2013	1	1:12	Sturgis, South Dakota, South Dakota	Light Heavyweight debut.

== See also ==
- List of male mixed martial artists
