= Cody Donovan =

American mixed martial arts fighter (1981)

- Born: February 20, 1981 (age 45); Waterloo, Iowa, United States
- Other names: Donnybrook
- Height: 6 ft 3 in (1.91 m)
- Weight: 205 lb (93 kg; 14 st 9 lb)
- Division: Light Heavyweight
- Reach: 74 in (190 cm)
- Fighting out of: Denver, Colorado, United States
- Team: Grudge Training Center; High Altitude Martial Arts; Jackson's Submission Fighting
- Rank: Black belt in Brazilian Jiu-Jitsu under Nate Marquardt
- Years active: 2008–2014

Mixed martial arts record
- Total: 13
- Wins: 8
- By knockout: 4
- By submission: 3
- By decision: 1
- Losses: 5
- By knockout: 5

Other information
- Website: Official Website; Official UFC Fighter Profile; High Altitude Martial Arts
- Mixed martial arts record from Sherdog

Cody Scott Donovan (born February 20, 1981) is an American practitioner of Brazilian Jiu-Jitsu. He is also a retired mixed martial artist, who is perhaps best known for his four-fight stint in the Light Heavyweight division of the Ultimate Fighting Championship. A professional MMA competitor since 2008, Donovan has also competed for Bellator.

== Background ==
Donovan was born in Waterloo, Iowa and is of Irish descent. He began training in Brazilian jiu-jitsu at the age of 17 and also worked as a security guard of a psychiatric ward of a hospital in Denver, Colorado before meeting Nate Marquardt, who introduced Donovan to mixed martial arts. Donovan attended the Art Institute of Colorado and graduated with a degree in media arts.

== Mixed martial arts career ==
=== Early career ===
Donovan held an amateur record of 4-1 and compiled a 7-2 record before signing a four-fight deal with the UFC.

=== Ultimate Fighting Championship ===
Donovan made his UFC debut on December 15, 2012 at UFC on FX 6 against Canadian Nick Penner, replacing an injured Eddie Mendez on nine days notice. He won the fight via TKO in the first round, earning Fight of the Night honors in the process.

Donovan faced Ovince St. Preux on August 17, 2013 at UFC Fight Night 26. He lost the fight via first-round KO.

Donovan was expected to face promotional newcomer Robert Drysdale on November 16, 2013 at UFC 167. However, Drysdale was refused a fighting license by the Nevada State Athletic Commission (NSAC) and was replaced by Gian Villante. He lost the fight via TKO in the second round.

Donovan faced Nikita Krylov on July 19, 2014 at UFC Fight Night 46. He lost the fight via TKO in the first round.

After three consecutive KO/TKO stoppage losses, Donovan announced his retirement from MMA competition.

== Personal life ==
Donovan is married.

== Brazilian Jiu-Jitsu Titles ==
- High Altitude Martial Arts
  - HAMA Light Heavyweight Championship (one time)

== Mixed martial arts record ==
Professional record breakdown
13 matches	8 wins	5 losses
By knockout	4	5
By submission	3	0
By decision	1	0

Res.	Record	Opponent	Method	Event	Date	Round	Time	Location	Notes
Loss	8–5	Nikita Krylov	TKO (punches)	UFC Fight Night: McGregor vs. Brandao	July 19, 2014	1	4:57	Dublin, Ireland	
Loss	8–4	Gian Villante	TKO (punches)	UFC 167	November 16, 2013	2	1:22	Las Vegas, Nevada, United States	
Loss	8–3	Ovince Saint Preux	KO (punches)	UFC Fight Night: Shogun vs. Sonnen	August 17, 2013	1	2:07	Boston, Massachusetts, United States	
Win	8–2	Nick Penner	KO (punches)	UFC on FX: Sotiropoulos vs. Pearson	December 15, 2012	1	4:35	Gold Coast, Australia	Fight of the Night
Win	7–2	Peter Nolan	Submission (rear-naked choke)	Instinct Fighting 4	June 29, 2012	1	3:41	Montreal, Quebec, Canada	
Win	6–2	Brian Albin	Decision (unanimous)	Bellator 38	March 26, 2011	3	5:00	Tunica, Mississippi, United States	
Win	5–2	Xavier Saccomanno	Submission (rear-naked choke)	Full Force Fighting 1	January 29, 2011	2	3:12	Denver, Colorado, United States	Won Full Force Fighting Light Heavyweight Championship
Loss	4–2	Cortez Coleman	TKO (corner stoppage)	C3 Fights: Slammin Jammin Weekend 5	August 7, 2010	1	N/A	Newkirk, Oklahoma, United States	Fight stopped due to injury
Win	4–1	Isaac Villanueva	Submission (rear-naked choke)	Ascend Combat: The Beginning	April 3, 2010	2	4:52	Shreveport, Louisiana, United States	
Loss	3–1	Eric Smith	TKO (punches)	ROF 36: Demolition	December 4, 2009	1	3:18	Denver, Colorado, United States	
Win	3–0	Joe Stripling	TKO (punches)	Shogun Fights 1	October 24, 2009	2	1:16	Baltimore, Maryland, United States	
Win	2–0	John Doyle	TKO (punches and elbows)	UWC 5: Man O' War	February 21, 2009	1	2:33	Fairfax, Virginia, United States	
Win	1–0	Wade Drake	TKO (punches)	UWC 4: Confrontation	October 11, 2008	1	0:15	Fairfax, Virginia, United States	
