= UFC on Fox: Lee vs. Iaquinta 2 =

UFC mixed martial arts event in 2018

- The poster for UFC on Fox: Lee vs. Iaquinta 2
- Promotion: Ultimate Fighting Championship
- Date: December 15, 2018
- Venue: Fiserv Forum
- City: Milwaukee, Wisconsin
- Attendance: 9,010
- Total gate: $616,633

Event chronology
UFC 231: Holloway vs. Ortega	UFC on Fox: Lee vs. Iaquinta 2	UFC 232: Jones vs. Gustafsson 2

UFC on Fox: Lee vs. Iaquinta 2 (also known as UFC on Fox 31) was a mixed martial arts event produced by the Ultimate Fighting Championship that was held on December 15, 2018, at Fiserv Forum in Milwaukee, Wisconsin, United States.

== Background ==
After previously contesting two events (UFC Live: Hardy vs. Lytle and UFC 164) in Milwaukee at Bradley Center, the event was the first for the promotion at the newly built venue.

The event also marked the end of the UFC's seven years with Fox as a new broadcast deal with ESPN was slated to begin in January 2019. It was also the last UFC event to air on network television until UFC on ABC: Holloway vs. Kattar in January 2021.

A lightweight rematch between former interim title challenger Kevin Lee and Al Iaquinta served as the event headliner. The pairing met previously in February 2014 at UFC 169 with Iaquinta winning the fight via unanimous decision.

Erik Koch was expected to face promotional newcomer Dwight Grant in a welterweight bout. However, Koch was removed from the card on November 28 for undisclosed reasons and replaced by Zak Ottow.

A women's flyweight bout between Jessica-Rose Clark and Andrea Lee was expected to take place at the event. However, Clark was forced out of the bout on weigh-in day as she was hospitalized due to a weight cutting issue and deemed medically unfit to compete by UFC physicians. As a result, the bout was cancelled.

== Results ==
Main Card (Fox)
Weight class				Method	Round	Time	Notes
Lightweight	Al Iaquinta	def.	Kevin Lee	Decision (unanimous) (48–47, 48–47, 49–46)	5	5:00
Lightweight	Edson Barboza	def.	Dan Hooker	KO (punch to the body)	3	2:19
Bantamweight	Rob Font	def.	Sergio Pettis	Decision (unanimous) (30–27, 30–27, 30–27)	3	5:00
Lightweight	Charles Oliveira	def.	Jim Miller	Submission (rear-naked choke)	1	1:15
Preliminary Card (Fox Sports 1)
Welterweight	Zak Ottow	def.	Dwight Grant	Decision (split) (28–29, 29–28, 29–28)	3	5:00
Lightweight	Drakkar Klose	def.	Bobby Green	Decision (unanimous) (29–28, 29–28, 29–28)	3	5:00
Lightweight	Joaquim Silva	def.	Jared Gordon	KO (punches)	3	2:39
Middleweight	Jack Hermansson	def.	Gerald Meerschaert	Submission (guillotine choke)	1	4:25
Middleweight	Zak Cummings	def.	Trevor Smith	Decision (unanimous) (29–28, 29–28, 29–28)	3	5:00
Featherweight	Dan Ige	def.	Jordan Griffin	Decision (unanimous) (29–28, 29–28, 29–28)	3	5:00
Early Preliminary Card (UFC Fight Pass)
Light Heavyweight	Mike Rodríguez	def.	Adam Milstead	TKO (knee to the body and punches)	1	2:59
Heavyweight	Juan Adams	def.	Chris de la Rocha	TKO (punches)	3	0:58

== Bonus awards ==
The following fighters received $50,000 bonuses:

- Fight of the Night: Joaquim Silva vs. Jared Gordon
- Performance of the Night: Al Iaquinta and Charles Oliveira

== Reported payout ==
The following is the reported payout to the fighters as reported to the Wisconsin's Department of Safety and Professional Services. It does not include sponsor money or "locker room" bonuses often given by the UFC and also do not include the UFC's traditional "fight night" bonuses. The total disclosed payout for the event was $1,216,000.

- Al Iaquinta: $138,000 ($69,000 win bonus) def. Kevin Lee: $84,000
- Edson Barboza: $100,000 ($50,000 win bonus) def. Dan Hooker: $75,000
- Rob Font: $92,000 ($46,000 win bonus) def. Sergio Pettis: $33,000
- Charles Oliveira: $180,000 ($90,000 win bonus) def. Jim Miller: $68,000
- Zak Ottow: $20,000 ($10,000 win bonus) def. Dwight Grant: $21,000
- Drakkar Klose: $72,000 ($36,000 win bonus) def. Bobby Green: $25,000
- Joaquim Silva: $28,000 ($14,000 win bonus) def. Jared Gordon: $16,000
- Jack Hermansson: $42,000 ($21,000 win bonus) def. Gerald Meerschaert: $35,000
- Zak Cummings: $58,000 ($29,000 win bonus) def. Trevor Smith: $29,000
- Dan Ige: $20,000 ($10,000 win bonus) def. Jordan Griffin: $12,000
- Mike Rodríguez: $24,000 ($12,000 win bonus) def. Adam Milstead: $10,000
- Juan Adams: $24,000 ($12,000 win bonus) def. Chris De La Rocha: $10,000

== See also ==
- List of UFC events
- 2018 in UFC
- List of current UFC fighters
