= UFC Fight Night: Almeida vs. Garbrandt =

UFC mixed martial arts event in 2016

- The poster for UFC Fight Night: Almeida vs. Garbrandt
- Promotion: Ultimate Fighting Championship
- Date: May 29, 2016
- Venue: Mandalay Bay Events Center
- City: Las Vegas, Nevada
- Attendance: 5,193
- Total gate: $359,000

Event chronology
UFC 198: Werdum vs. Miocic	UFC Fight Night: Almeida vs. Garbrandt	UFC 199: Rockhold vs. Bisping 2

UFC Fight Night: Almeida vs. Garbrandt (also known as UFC Fight Night 88) was a mixed martial arts event held on May 29, 2016, at the Mandalay Bay Events Center in Las Vegas, Nevada.

== Background ==
A bantamweight bout between top undefeated prospects Thomas Almeida and Cody Garbrandt headlined the event.

Keith Berish was very briefly linked to a bout with Jake Collier at the event. However, Berish pulled out due to injury on March 31 and was replaced by UFC newcomer Alberto Uda.

Joe Proctor was expected to face Erik Koch at the event. However, Proctor pulled out of the fight on April 21 citing injury and was replaced by Shane Campbell.

Carlos Diego Ferreira was expected to face Abel Trujillo, but was pulled from the event on May 13 due to a potential USADA anti-doping violation stemming from a recent out-of-competition sample collection. In accordance with the UFC Anti-Doping Policy, Ferreira has received a provisional suspension. Additional violation information will be provided at the appropriate time as the process moves forward. He was replaced by UFC newcomer Jordan Rinaldi.

== Results ==
Main Card (Fox Sports 1)
Weight class				Method	Round	Time	Notes
Bantamweight	Cody Garbrandt	def.	Thomas Almeida	KO (punches)	1	2:53
Featherweight	Jeremy Stephens	def.	Renan Barão	Decision (unanimous) (29–28, 29–28, 29–28)	3	5:00
Welterweight	Rick Story	def.	Tarec Saffiedine	Decision (unanimous) (29–28, 29–28, 30–27)	3	5:00
Middleweight	Chris Camozzi	def.	Vitor Miranda	Decision (unanimous) (30–27, 30–27, 30–27)	3	5:00
Welterweight	Lorenz Larkin	def.	Jorge Masvidal	Decision (split) (29–28, 28–29, 29–28)	3	5:00
Lightweight	Paul Felder	def.	Josh Burkman	Decision (unanimous) (29–28, 29–28, 29–28)	3	5:00
Preliminary Card (Fox Sports 1)
Women's Bantamweight	Sara McMann	def.	Jessica Eye	Decision (unanimous) (30–27, 30–27, 30–27)	3	5:00
Lightweight	Abel Trujillo	def.	Jordan Rinaldi	Decision (unanimous) (29–28, 29–28, 29–28)	3	5:00
Middleweight	Jake Collier	def.	Alberto Uda	TKO (knee and spinning back kick to the body)	2	1:06
Lightweight	Erik Koch	def.	Shane Campbell	Submission (rear-naked choke)	2	3:02
Preliminary Card (UFC Fight Pass)
Bantamweight	Bryan Caraway	def.	Aljamain Sterling	Decision (split) (29–28, 28–29, 29–28)	3	5:00
Heavyweight	Adam Milstead	def.	Chris de la Rocha	TKO (punches)	2	4:01

== Bonus awards ==
The following fighters were awarded $50,000 bonuses:

- Fight of the Night: Jeremy Stephens vs. Renan Barão
- Performance of the Night: Cody Garbrandt and Jake Collier

== Reported payout ==
The following is the reported payout to the fighters as reported to the Nevada State Athletic Commission. It does not include sponsor money and also does not include the UFC's traditional "fight night" bonuses.

- Cody Garbrandt: $48,000 (includes $24,000 win bonus) def. Thomas Almeida: $25,000
- Jeremy Stephens: $100,000 (includes $50,000 win bonus) def. Renan Barão: $50,000
- Rick Story: $76,000 (includes $38,000 win bonus) def. Tarec Saffiedine: $37,000
- Chris Camozzi: $72,000 (includes $36,000 win bonus) def. Vitor Miranda: $18,000
- Lorenz Larkin: $72,000 (includes $36,000 win bonus) def. Jorge Masvidal: $57,000
- Paul Felder: $42,000 (includes $21,000 win bonus) def. Josh Burkman: $48,000
- Sara McMann: $50,000 (includes $25,000 win bonus) def. Jessica Eye: $25,000
- Abel Trujillo: $50,000 (includes $25,000 win bonus) def. Jordan Rinaldi: $10,000
- Jake Collier: $30,000 (includes $15,000 win bonus) def. Alberto Uda: $10,000
- Erik Koch: $42,000 (includes $21,000 win bonus) def. Shane Campbell: $15,000
- Bryan Caraway: $36,000 (includes $18,000 win bonus) def. Aljamain Sterling: $30,000
- Adam Milstead: $20,000 (includes $10,000 win bonus) def. Chris De La Rocha: $10,000

== See also ==
- List of UFC events
- 2016 in UFC
