= UFC Fight Night: Andrade vs. Zhang =

UFC mixed martial arts event in 2019

- The poster for UFC Fight Night: Andrade vs. Zhang
- Promotion: Ultimate Fighting Championship
- Date: August 31, 2019
- Venue: Shenzhen Universade Sports Centre Arena
- City: Shenzhen, China
- Attendance: 10,302

Event chronology
UFC 241: Cormier vs. Miocic 2	UFC Fight Night: Andrade vs. Zhang	UFC 242: Khabib vs. Poirier

UFC Fight Night: Andrade vs. Zhang (also known as UFC Fight Night 157 or UFC on ESPN+ 15) was a mixed martial arts event produced by the Ultimate Fighting Championship that took place on August 31, 2019, at Shenzhen Universiade Sports Centre Arena in Shenzhen, China.

== Background ==
The event marked the promotion's first visit to Shenzhen.

A UFC Women's Strawweight Championship bout between former champion Jéssica Andrade and Zhang Weili served as the event's headliner.

A flyweight bout between Luana Carolina and Wu Yanan had been rescheduled and was expected to take place at the event. The pairing was first scheduled to take place at UFC 237. However, Yanan pulled out of the bout due to injury and was replaced by Priscila Cachoeira. In turn, Carolina suffered a fractured spine and was forced to pull out of the event. She was replaced by Mizuki Inoue. At the weigh-ins, Yanan weighed in at 129 pounds, 3 pounds over the flyweight non-title fight limit of 126. As a result, she was fined 30 percent of her purse and the bout proceeded at a catchweight.

A welterweight bout between Li Jingliang and Elizeu Zaleski dos Santos was initially scheduled to take place in November 2018 at UFC Fight Night: Blaydes vs. Ngannou 2. However, Santos pulled out of the contest due to a knee injury and was replaced by David Zawada. The pairing was rescheduled for this event.

A light heavyweight bout between Saparbek Safarov and Da Un Jung was scheduled for the event. However, on August 5, it was announced that Safarov withdrew from the event due to undisclosed reasons and he was replaced by Jamahal Hill. In turn, Hill was forced to withdraw from the card due to visa issues. Jung instead faced Khadis Ibragimov.

A featherweight bout between Movsar Evloev and Mike Grundy was scheduled for the event. However, on August 19, it was reported that Grundy was forced to pull out of the event citing injury. He was replaced by promotional newcomer Lu Zhenhong. The pairing met previously in 2015 under M-1 Global with Evloev winning a decision. Subsequently, the bout was scrapped from the event as Lu suffered a cut during a sparring session after the weigh-ins and was ruled out of the fight by medical personnel.

== Results ==
Fight Card (ESPN+)
Weight class				Method	Round	Time	Notes
Women's Strawweight	Zhang Weili	def.	Jéssica Andrade (c)	TKO (knees and punches)	1	0:42	(Note: For the UFC Women's Strawweight Championship.)
Welterweight	Li Jingliang	def.	Elizeu Zaleski dos Santos	TKO (punches)	3	4:51
Flyweight	Kai Kara-France	def.	Mark De La Rosa	Decision (unanimous) (30–27, 30–27, 29–28)	3	5:00
Welterweight	Song Kenan	def.	Derrick Krantz	Decision (unanimous) (29–28, 29–28, 29–28)	3	5:00
Catchweight (129 lb)	Mizuki Inoue	def.	Wu Yanan	Decision (split) (28–29, 29–28, 29–28)	3	5:00
Preliminary Card (ESPN)
Middleweight	Anthony Hernandez	def.	Jun Yong Park	Submission (anaconda choke)	2	4:39
Bantamweight	Su Mudaerji	def.	Andre Soukhamthath	Decision (unanimous) (30–26, 30–26, 30–25)	3	5:00
Light Heavyweight	Da Un Jung	def.	Khadis Ibragimov	Submission (standing guillotine choke)	3	2:00
Lightweight	Damir Ismagulov	def.	Thiago Moisés	Decision (unanimous) (30–26, 30–27, 30–27)	3	5:00
Bantamweight	Alateng Heili	def.	Danaa Batgerel	Decision (unanimous) (29–27, 29–27, 29–27)	3	5:00
Women's Bantamweight	Karol Rosa	def.	Lara Procópio	Decision (split) (28–29, 30–27, 29–28)	3	5:00

== Bonus awards ==
The following fighters received $50,000 bonuses.

- Fight of the Night: Alateng Heili vs. Danaa Batgerel
- Performance of the Night: Zhang Weili and Li Jingliang

== See also ==
- List of UFC events
- 2019 in UFC
- List of current UFC fighters
