= Jake Collier =

American mixed martial artist (born 1988)

- Born: October 23, 1988 (age 37); St. Louis, Missouri, U.S.
- Other names: The Prototype
- Height: 6 ft 3 in (1.91 m)
- Weight: 257 lb (117 kg; 18.4 st)
- Division: Heavyweight; Light Heavyweight; Middleweight
- Reach: 78.5 in (199 cm)
- Fighting out of: Cuba, Missouri, United States
- Team: Smith Pit MMA (2009–present)
- Years active: 2010–present

Mixed martial arts record
- Total: 25
- Wins: 14
- By knockout: 6
- By submission: 4
- By decision: 4
- Losses: 11
- By knockout: 5
- By submission: 1
- By decision: 5

Other information
- Mixed martial arts record from Sherdog

Jake Collier (born October 23, 1988) is an American mixed martial artist who competes in the Heavyweight division and competed in the Ultimate Fighting Championship (UFC).

== Background ==
With no background in sports, Collier started Brazilian jiu-jitsu to lose weight at the age of 20. Eventually he started competing in the sport, quickly taking his first amateur mixed martial arts bout.

== Mixed martial arts career ==
=== Early career ===
After compiling an amateur record of 12–2, Collier made his professional debut in November 2010. He competed primarily for regional organizations around his native state of Missouri. He amassed a record of 8–1 before signing with the UFC on the heels of a first round rear naked choke finish of Gabriel Checco at RFA 19.

=== Ultimate Fighting Championship ===
Collier made his promotional debut against Vitor Miranda on December 20, 2014 at UFC Fight Night 58. He lost the fight via TKO in the final seconds of the first round.

Collier next faced Ricardo Abreu on June 6, 2015 at UFC Fight Night 68, filling in for an injured Daniel Sarafian. Collier won the fight via split decision.

Collier faced returning veteran Yang Dongi on November 28, 2015 at UFC Fight Night 79. He lost the fight via TKO in the second round.

Collier next faced promotional newcomer Alberto Uda on May 29, 2016 at UFC Fight Night 88. He won the fight via TKO in the second round and was awarded a Performance of the Night bonus.

Collier was expected to face Josh Stansbury in a light heavyweight bout on December 3, 2016 at The Ultimate Fighter 24 Finale. However, Collier pulled out of the fight in late October citing injury and was replaced by Devin Clark.

Collier faced Devin Clark on April 15, 2017 at UFC on Fox 24. He lost the fight by unanimous decision.

Collier faced Marcel Fortuna on November 11, 2017 at UFC Fight Night: Poirier vs. Pettis. He won the fight by unanimous decision.

Collier was scheduled to face Marcin Prachnio on February 24, 2018 at UFC on Fox 28. However, on January 4, 2018, he was forced to pull out from the fight citing injury.

On February 16, 2019 it was announced that Collier had tested positive for higenamine in an out of competition test for which he received a ten-month suspension and he will be eligible to compete again on October 27, 2019.

Collier was scheduled to face Tom Aspinall in a heavyweight bout on March 21, 2020 at UFC Fight Night: Woodley vs. Edwards after more than two years of absence from the UFC. However, due to COVID-19 pandemic, the event was cancelled. Subsequently, the pairing was left intact and took place on July 25, 2020 at UFC on ESPN 14. He lost the fight via technical knockout in round one.

Collier faced Gian Villante on December 5, 2020 at UFC on ESPN 19. He won the fight via unanimous decision.

Collier faced Carlos Felipe on June 12, 2021 at UFC 263. He lost the fight by split decision.

Collier faced Chase Sherman on January 15, 2022 at UFC on ESPN 32. He won the bout via rear naked choke submission in round one. This win earned him the Performance of the Night award.

As the first bout of his new four-fight contract, Collier was scheduled to face Justin Tafa on April 30, 2022, at UFC on ESPN 35. However, Tafa withdrew from event for undisclosed reasons, and he was replaced by Andrei Arlovski. He lost the bout via split decision. 14 out of 14 media scores gave it to Collier.

Collier faced Chris Barnett on September 10, 2022 at UFC 279. At the weigh-ins, Barnett weighed in at 267.5 pounds, 1.5 pounds over the non-title heavyweight limit. Barnett was fined 20% of his purse, which went to Collier. Despite knocking down Barnett in the first, Collier lost the fight via TKO in the second round.

Collier faced Martin Buday on April 15, 2023 at UFC on ESPN 44 but was moved to UFC on ESPN: Song vs. Simón for unknown reasons. He lost the fight via unanimous decision.

Collier was scheduled to face Valter Walker at UFC Fight Night 228 on September 23, 2023. However, Walker withdrew from the bout for unknown reasons and was replaced by Mohammed Usman. Collier lost the fight via unanimous decision.

On October 9, 2023, it was announced that Collier was no longer on the UFC roster.

=== Post UFC ===
Collier faced Kelvin Fitial at Shamrock FC 357 on September 7, 2024 and won the bout by knockout in the first round. This fight earned him a $1000 Fight of the Night award. This fight also earned him a Knockout of the Night award.

== Personal life ==
Collier has three sons.

== Championships and accomplishments ==
=== Mixed martial arts ===
- Ultimate Fighting Championship
  - Performance of the Night (Two times) vs. Alberto Uda and Chase Sherman
- Shamrock Fighting Championships
  - Fight of the Night (One time) vs. Kelvin Fitial
  - Knockout of the Night (One time) vs. Kelvin Fitial

== Mixed martial arts record ==
Professional record breakdown
| 25 matches | 14 wins | 11 losses |
| By knockout | 6 | 5 |
| By submission | 4 | 1 |
| By decision | 4 | 5 |

| Res. | Record | Opponent | Method | Event | Date | Round | Time | Location | Notes |
|---|---|---|---|---|---|---|---|---|---|
| Loss | 14–11 | Christian Edwards | TKO (submission to slam) | Shamrock FC 360 | January 18, 2025 | 1 | 3:36 | St. Charles, Missouri, United States | Return to Light Heavyweight; Edwards missed weight (208.8 lb). |
| Win | 14–10 | Kelvin Fitial | KO (punch) | Shamrock FC 357 | September 7, 2024 | 1 | 0:24 | St. Charles, Missouri, United States | Knockout of the Night. Fight of the Night. |
| Loss | 13–10 | Mohammed Usman | Decision (unanimous) | UFC Fight Night: Fiziev vs. Gamrot | September 23, 2023 | 3 | 5:00 | Las Vegas, Nevada, United States | |
| Loss | 13–9 | Martin Buday | Decision (unanimous) | UFC on ESPN: Song vs. Simón | April 29, 2023 | 3 | 5:00 | Las Vegas, Nevada, United States | |
| Loss | 13–8 | Chris Barnett | TKO (punches) | UFC 279 | September 10, 2022 | 2 | 2:24 | Las Vegas, Nevada, United States | Catchweight (267.5 lb) bout; Barnett missed weight. |
| Loss | 13–7 | Andrei Arlovski | Decision (split) | UFC on ESPN: Font vs. Vera | April 30, 2022 | 3 | 5:00 | Las Vegas, Nevada, United States | |
| Win | 13–6 | Chase Sherman | Submission (rear-naked choke) | UFC on ESPN: Kattar vs. Chikadze | January 15, 2022 | 1 | 2:26 | Las Vegas, Nevada, United States | Performance of the Night. |
| Loss | 12–6 | Carlos Felipe | Decision (split) | UFC 263 | June 12, 2021 | 3 | 5:00 | Glendale, Arizona, United States | |
| Win | 12–5 | Gian Villante | Decision (unanimous) | UFC on ESPN: Hermansson vs. Vettori | December 5, 2020 | 3 | 5:00 | Las Vegas, Nevada, United States | |
| Loss | 11–5 | Tom Aspinall | TKO (knee and punches) | UFC on ESPN: Whittaker vs. Till | July 26, 2020 | 1 | 0:45 | Abu Dhabi, United Arab Emirates | Heavyweight debut. |
| Win | 11–4 | Marcel Fortuna | Decision (unanimous) | UFC Fight Night: Poirier vs. Pettis | November 11, 2017 | 3 | 5:00 | Norfolk, Virginia, United States | |
| Loss | 10–4 | Devin Clark | Decision (unanimous) | UFC on Fox: Johnson vs. Reis | April 15, 2017 | 3 | 5:00 | Kansas City, Missouri, United States | Light Heavyweight debut. |
| Win | 10–3 | Alberto Uda | TKO (knee and body kick) | UFC Fight Night: Almeida vs. Garbrandt | May 29, 2016 | 2 | 1:06 | Las Vegas, Nevada, United States | Performance of the Night. |
| Loss | 9–3 | Yang Dongi | TKO (punches) | UFC Fight Night: Henderson vs. Masvidal | November 28, 2015 | 2 | 1:50 | Seoul, South Korea | |
| Win | 9–2 | Ricardo Abreu | Decision (split) | UFC Fight Night: Boetsch vs. Henderson | June 6, 2015 | 3 | 5:00 | New Orleans, Louisiana, United States | |
| Loss | 8–2 | Vitor Miranda | TKO (head kick and punches) | UFC Fight Night: Machida vs. Dollaway | December 20, 2014 | 1 | 4:59 | Barueri, Brazil | |
| Win | 8–1 | Gabriel Checco | Submission (rear-naked choke) | RFA 19 | October 10, 2014 | 1 | 4:27 | Prior Lake, Minnesota, United States | Won the RFA Middleweight Championship. |
| Win | 7–1 | Quartus Stitt | Submission (guillotine choke) | Rumble Times Promotions | May 3, 2013 | 1 | 1:32 | St. Charles, Missouri, United States | |
| Win | 6–1 | Cully Butterfield | Decision (unanimous) | Rumble Times Promotions | October 26, 2012 | 3 | 5:00 | St. Charles, Missouri, United States | |
| Win | 5–1 | Sean Huffman | TKO (punches) | Cage Championships 38 | June 23, 2012 | 1 | 0:48 | Sullivan, Missouri, United States | |
| Win | 4–1 | James Wade | TKO (punches) | Cage Championships 37 | April 7, 2012 | 1 | 1:22 | Washington, Missouri, United States | |
| Loss | 3–1 | Kelvin Tiller | Submission (triangle choke) | Fight Me MMA | January 13, 2012 | 1 | 4:40 | St. Charles, Missouri, United States | |
| Win | 3–0 | Dan McGlasson | KO (punch) | Fight Me MMA | August 13, 2011 | 1 | 1:26 | St. Charles, Missouri, United States | |
| Win | 2–0 | Darryl Cobb | Submission (rear-naked choke) | Rumble Time Promotions | April 15, 2011 | 3 | 4:08 | St. Charles, Missouri, United States | |
| Win | 1–0 | James Wade | TKO (punches) | Rumble Time Promotions | November 19, 2010 | 1 | 2:05 | St. Charles, Missouri, United States | |

== See also ==
- List of male mixed martial artists
