= UFC on ESPN: Hermansson vs. Vettori =

2020 UFC mixed martial arts event

- The poster for UFC on ESPN: Hermansson vs. Vettori
- Promotion: Ultimate Fighting Championship
- Date: December 5, 2020
- Venue: UFC Apex
- City: Enterprise, Nevada, United States
- Attendance: None (behind closed doors)

Event chronology
UFC on ESPN: Smith vs. Clark	UFC on ESPN: Hermansson vs. Vettori	UFC 256: Figueiredo vs. Moreno

UFC on ESPN: Hermansson vs. Vettori (also known as UFC on ESPN 19 and UFC Vegas 16) was a mixed martial arts event produced by the Ultimate Fighting Championship that took place on December 5, 2020 at the UFC Apex facility in Enterprise, Nevada, part of the Las Vegas Metropolitan Area, United States.

== Background ==
The promotion was targeting a middleweight bout between former UFC Welterweight Championship challenger Darren Till and Jack Hermansson to serve as the event headliner. However, it was revealed on November 6 that Till was forced to withdraw from the planned bout due to an undisclosed injury. He was replaced by Kevin Holland. In turn, Holland was removed from the contest on November 28 after testing positive for COVID-19. Marvin Vettori, who was expected to face former Strikeforce Middleweight Champion Ronaldo Souza a week later at UFC 256, served as his replacement. The UFC also opted to reschedule Holland as Vettori's replacement at UFC 256.

John Allan and Roman Dolidze were originally scheduled to meet at UFC 255 in a light heavyweight bout. They were eventually rescheduled for this event.

A bantamweight bout between Cody Stamann and Merab Dvalishvili was expected to take place at this event. However, it was announced on October 22 that Stamann pulled out due to undisclosed reasons. He was replaced by Raoni Barcelos. The new booking fell through on November 19, as it was revealed that Barcelos was removed from the contest due to a medical suspension related to his latest bout at UFC on ESPN: Santos vs. Teixeira.

A featherweight bout between Gabriel Benítez and Justin Jaynes was initially scheduled for UFC Fight Night: Felder vs. dos Anjos a month earlier, but the pairing was postponed after Benítez tested positive for COVID-19. The matchup was left intact and took place at this event.

Also scheduled for UFC Fight Night: Felder vs. dos Anjos, a bantamweight bout between Louis Smolka and José Alberto Quiñónez was cancelled after Smolka pulled out of their fight as a result of ill-effects from his weight cut on the day of the event. They were then rescheduled for this event.

Maryna Moroz was expected to face Taila Santos in a women's flyweight bout at this event. However, it was announced on November 18 that Moroz had to pull out and Montana De La Rosa would be her replacement. Just hours before the event, the UFC decided to remove the fight after one of De La Rosa's cornermen tested positive for COVID-19. Santos was then rescheduled to face Gillian Robertson two weeks later at UFC Fight Night: Thompson vs. Neal.

A women's bantamweight bout between former UFC Women's Bantamweight Championship challenger Bethe Correia and Wu Yanan was expected to take place at this event. However, due to visa issues, they were rescheduled for UFC Fight Night: Holloway vs. Kattar on January 16, 2021.

At the weigh-ins, former interim UFC Light Heavyweight Championship challenger Ovince Saint Preux weighed in at 207.5 pounds, one and a half pounds over the light heavyweight non-title fight limit. His bout proceeded at a catchweight and he was fined 20% of his individual purse, which went to his opponent Jamahal Hill.

Along with the cancellation of the De La Rosa/Santos bout, two other fights were also removed from the event – a featherweight bout between Nate Landwehr and Movsar Evloev, as well as a flyweight bout between Cody Durden and Jimmy Flick. The former was due to Evloev testing positive for COVID-19. The latter was due to a non-COVID related medical issue with Durden, before being rescheduled for UFC Fight Night: Thompson vs. Neal.

== Results ==
Main card (ESPN2 / ESPN+)
Weight class				Method	Round	Time	Notes
Middleweight	Marvin Vettori	def.	Jack Hermansson	Decision (unanimous) (49–46, 49–46, 49–45)	5	5:00
Catchweight (207.5 lb)	Jamahal Hill	def.	Ovince Saint Preux	TKO (punches)	2	3:37
Lightweight	Gabriel Benítez	def.	Justin Jaynes	TKO (knee to the body and elbows)	1	4:06
Light Heavyweight	Roman Dolidze	def.	John Allan	Decision (split) (28–29, 30–27, 29–28)	3	5:00
Lightweight	Jordan Leavitt	def.	Matt Wiman	KO (slam)	1	0:22
Preliminary card (ESPN2 / ESPN+)
Bantamweight	Louis Smolka	def.	José Alberto Quiñónez	TKO (punches)	2	2:15
Featherweight	Ilia Topuria	def.	Damon Jackson	KO (punches)	1	2:38
Heavyweight	Jake Collier	def.	Gian Villante	Decision (unanimous) (30–27, 30–27, 30–27)	3	5:00

== Bonus awards ==
The following fighters received $50,000 bonuses.

- Fight of the Night: Marvin Vettori vs. Jack Hermansson
- Performance of the Night: Gabriel Benítez and Jordan Leavitt

== See also ==
- List of UFC events
- List of current UFC fighters
- 2020 in UFC
