= Adam Milstead =

American MMA fighter (born 1987)

- Born: Adam Alexander Milstead; July 3, 1987 (age 39); Calvert County, Maryland, U.S.
- Other names: The Prototype
- Height: 6 ft 3 in (1.91 m)
- Weight: 93 kg (205 lb; 14 st 9 lb)
- Division: Heavyweight; Light Heavyweight
- Reach: 76 in (193 cm)
- Fighting out of: Beaver Falls, Pennsylvania, United States
- Team: Pittsburgh Fight Club
- Years active: 2009–2018

Mixed martial arts record
- Total: 12
- Wins: 8
- By knockout: 6
- By submission: 2
- Losses: 3
- By knockout: 1
- By decision: 2
- No contests: 1

Amateur record
- Total: 1
- Wins: 1

Other information
- Mixed martial arts record from Sherdog

Adam Alexander Milstead (born July 3, 1987) is an American former mixed martial arts fighter who competed in the Light Heavyweight division of the Ultimate Fighting Championship. A professional competitor from 2009 up until 2018, he also competed for King of the Cage. Since retiring from the UFC, he now competes as a professional kayak angler across the country.

== Background ==
Born and raised in Calvert, Maryland, Milstead began wrestling in the second grade, and was a standout in football and wrestling at Calvert High School, graduating in 2006. Milstead later continued his football career at the collegiate level for half a semester before dropping out.

Adam got married in June 2020 to Pittsburgh native, Mary Rodavich. They have a yellow Labrador retriever, Cal, who is named after Adam’s hometown of Calvert County, MD.

Adam is now a full-time corrosion control specialist (CP2) and a professional kayak angler. He competes in bass fishing tournaments and posts videos about his experiences on his YouTube channel l.

== Mixed martial arts career ==
=== Early career ===
Milstead held an amateur record of 10–2 before making his professional MMA debut in May 2011. After losing his first match, he amassed a record of 7-1 before signing with the UFC.

=== Ultimate Fighting Championship ===
Milstead made his UFC debut in May 2016 as he faced Chris de la Rocha at UFC Fight Night: Almeida vs. Garbrandt. He won the fight by TKO in the second round.

For his second fight with the promotion, Milstead faced Curtis Blaydes at UFC Fight Night: Bermudez vs. Korean Zombie on February 4, 2017. He originally lost the fight via TKO in the second round; however, the win was later overturned to a No Contest when Blaydes tested positive for marijuana.

For his next fight, Milstead moved down to the Light Heavyweight division. He faced Jordan Johnson on March 3, 2018 at UFC 222. He lost the fight by split decision.

Milstead faced Mike Rodríguez on December 15, 2018 at UFC on Fox 31. He lost the fight via TKO in the first round. Following the fight, Milstead announced his retirement from MMA.

== Mixed martial arts record ==
Professional record breakdown
12 matches	8 wins	3 losses
By knockout	6	2
By submission	2	0
By decision	0	1
No contests	1	

Res.	Record	Opponent	Method	Event	Date	Round	Time	Location	Notes
Loss	8–3 (1)	Mike Rodríguez	TKO (knee to the body and punches)	UFC on Fox: Lee vs. Iaquinta 2	December 15, 2018	1	2:59	Milwaukee, Wisconsin, United States	
Loss	8–2 (1)	Jordan Johnson	Decision (split)	UFC 222	March 3, 2018	3	5:00	Las Vegas, Nevada, United States	Light Heavyweight debut.
NC	8–1 (1)	Curtis Blaydes	NC (overturned)	UFC Fight Night: Bermudez vs. Korean Zombie	February 4, 2017	2	0:59	Houston, Texas, United States	Originally a TKO (knee injury) win for Blaydes; overturned after he tested positive for Marijuana.
Win	8–1	Chris de la Rocha	TKO (punches)	UFC Fight Night: Almeida vs. Garbrandt	May 29, 2016	2	4:01	Las Vegas, Nevada, United States	
Win	7–1	Robert Morrow	TKO (punches)	KOTC: Hands of Steel	September 26, 2015	1	1:55	Washington, Pennsylvania, United States	
Win	6–1	Lewis Rumsey	TKO (punches)	GOTC MMA: Gladiators of the Cage 18	August 22, 2015	1	1:10	Cheswick, Pennsylvania, United States	
Win	5–1	Nick Smiley	TKO (punches)	Pinnacle FC: Pittsburgh Challenge Series 8	July 12, 2014	1	0:58	Canonsburg, Pennsylvania, United States	
Win	4–1	Tex Trismegistus	Submission (armbar)	Gladiators of the Cage: The North Shore's Rise to Power	January 26, 2013	2	4:10	Pittsburgh, Pennsylvania, United States	
Win	3–1	Bobby Gurley	TKO (punches)	Pinnacle FC: Pittsburgh Challenge Series 1	December 29, 2012	1	3:49	Pittsburgh, Pennsylvania, United States	
Win	2–1	DeAndre Billingsley	Submission (guillotine choke)	NAAFS: Midwest Combat Challenge 22	September 21, 2012	1	1:20	Medina, Ohio, United States	
Win	1–1	Nathan Bryant	KO (punches)	NAAFS: Caged Fury 17	April 27, 2012	2	3:14	Morgantown, West Virginia, United States	
Loss	0–1	Dane Bonnigson	TKO (punches)	NAAFS: Spohn vs. Hawk 2	May 21, 2011	1	2:51	Streetsboro, Ohio, United States	

== Professional Fishing Career ==
Adam competes as a professional kayak bass angler out of southwestern Pennsylvania. His personal best is a 21 inch bass. He placed 6th out of 232 anglers at the Bassmaster Kayak Series at Dale Hollow Reservoir in Tennessee.
