= Chase Sherman =

American mixed martial artist (born 1989)

- Born: Chase Sherman; November 16, 1989 (age 36); D'Iberville, Mississippi, U.S.
- Other names: Chase the Green
- Height: 6 ft 4 in (1.93 m)
- Weight: 265 lb (120 kg; 18 st 13 lb)
- Division: Heavyweight
- Reach: 78 in (198 cm)
- Stance: Orthodox
- Fighting out of: D'Iberville, Mississippi, U.S.
- Team: Alan Belcher MMA Club (formerly); Jackson-Wink MMA (formerly); Sanford MMA (2021–present)
- Rank: Purple belt in Kickboxing under Duke Roufus; Blue belt in Brazilian Jiu-Jitsu
- Years active: 2014–present

Mixed martial arts record
- Total: 32
- Wins: 18
- By knockout: 17
- By decision: 1
- Losses: 14
- By knockout: 4
- By submission: 4
- By decision: 6

Other information
- Mixed martial arts record from Sherdog

Chase Sherman (born November 16, 1989) is an American professional mixed martial artist and former bare-knuckle boxer. A professional MMA competitor since 2014, he has competed for the UFC and Titan FC.

== Background ==
Born and raised in D'Iberville, Mississippi, Sherman played football at D'Iberville High School. He continued with the sport on a scholarship to Jones Junior College, before transferring to NCAA Division II Delta State University after two years. At Delta State, Sherman helped the team reach the Division II National Championship in 2010 as an offensive tackle. Sherman also earned a bachelor's degree in sports management and exercise science from Delta State. In 2019, Sherman revealed that he had graduated from the fire academy, and is eligible to work as a firefighter.

== Mixed martial arts career ==
=== Early career ===
After amassing an amateur record of 4–0, Sherman made his professional debut in April 2014. Over the next two years he fought ten times and amassed a record of 9–1; all of his wins came by TKO in the first round.

=== Ultimate Fighting Championship ===
Sherman made his promotional debut on August 6, 2016, at UFC Fight Night 92 against Justin Ledet. He lost the fight via unanimous decision.

Sherman next faced Walt Harris on January 15, 2017, at UFC Fight Night 103. He lost the fight by knockout in the second round.

For his third fight for the promotion, Sherman was scheduled to face Dmitry Poberezhets at UFC 211 on May 13, 2017. However, Poberezhets was removed from the card for undisclosed reasons and was replaced by newcomer Rashad Coulter. Sherman won the fight by knockout in the second round. The back-and-forth action earned both participants Fight of the Night honors.

Prior to his fourth fight in UFC, Sherman revealed he had signed a new, four-fight contract with UFC.

For his next fight, Sherman was tapped as a short notice replacement for Christian Colombo and faced Damian Grabowski on July 22, 2017, at UFC on Fox 25. He won the fight via unanimous decision.

Sherman faced Shamil Abdurakhimov on November 25, 2017, at UFC Fight Night 122. He lost the fight via knockout in the first round.

Sherman faced Justin Willis on April 21, 2018, at UFC Fight Night 128. He lost the fight via unanimous decision.

In what marked the last fight of his contract, Sherman faced Augusto Sakai at UFC Fight Night 137 on September 22, 2018. He lost the fight via TKO in the third round.

=== Post-UFC career ===
Sherman made his comeback to Island Fights 51 on December 21, 2018, against Frank Tate. He won by TKO in the first round.

Sherman next faced Jeremy May on February 7, 2019, at Island Fights 52. He won the fight by TKO in the very first round.

Sherman faced Rashaun Jackson on May 9, 2019, at Island Fights 56. He won the fight by TKO in the first round.

Sherman was then set to fight former M-1 Global Heavyweight Champion Kenny Garner on April 11, 2020, but the event was cancelled due to the COVID-19 pandemic.

=== Return to Ultimate Fighting Championship ===
Sherman returned to UFC and faced Ike Villanueva on May 13, 2020, at UFC Fight Night: Smith vs. Teixeira. Outclassing Villanueva on the feet, Sherman won the fight via technical knockout in round two. Sherman received nine month USADA suspension for testing positive for Anastrozole from a in-competition sample collected on May 13, 2020. He became eligible to fight again on February 13, 2021.

Sherman was scheduled to face Parker Porter on April 17, 2021, at UFC on ESPN 22. However, Porter was removed from the event for undisclosed reasons and was replaced by Andrei Arlovski. Sherman lost the fight via unanimous decision.

Sherman faced Parker Porter on August 21, 2021, at UFC on ESPN 29. He lost the fight via unanimous decision.

As the last bout of his prevailing contract, Sherman faced Jake Collier on January 15, 2022, at UFC on ESPN 32. He lost the bout via rear-naked choke submission in round one.

After the loss, it was announced that Sherman's contract was not renewed.

Sherman was re-signed by the UFC four days after he was released the second time, as he replaced Tanner Boser against Alexander Romanov at UFC Fight Night: Lemos vs. Andrade. However, the fight was cancelled when Sherman was deemed unable to compete due to a "minor heath issue" on the day of the event and the pair was rescheduled for UFC on ESPN 35. Sherman lost the fight via keylock submission in the first round.

Sherman faced Jared Vanderaa on July 9, 2022, at UFC on ESPN: dos Anjos vs. Fiziev. He won the fight via TKO in round three. This win earned him the Performance of the Night award.

Sherman was scheduled to face Josh Parisian on November 5, 2022, at UFC Fight Night 214. However, Parisian pulled out of the fight hours before it was to take place due to medical issues.

Sherman faced Waldo Cortes-Acosta on November 19, 2022, at UFC Fight Night 215. He lost the fight via unanimous decision.

Sherman was scheduled to face Chris Barnett on April 8, 2023, at UFC 287. However, Barnett pulled out due to undisclosed reasons in early April and was replaced by Karl Williams. In turn, Sherman withdrew the day of the event due to a medical issue and the bout was scrapped.

Sherman was rescheduled against Karl William on May 13, 2023, at UFC on ABC 4, losing the bout via unanimous decision.

After the loss, it was reported on May 16 that Sherman was no longer on the UFC roster.

=== Gamebred FC ===
Sherman faced Carl Seumanutafa at Gamebred Bareknuckle MMA 6 on October 28, 2023. He won the fight via knockout in the first round.

Sherman faced Alex Nicholson at Gamebred Bareknuckle MMA 7 on March 2, 2024. Sherman won the fight by a left-hook knockout in the first round.

Sherman was scheduled to face Greg Hardy on November 15, 2024 at Gamebred Bareknuckle MMA 8. However, Hardy withdrew for unknown reasons and was replaced by Maurice Greene. He lost the bout by a standing guillotine-choke submission.

Sherman faced Anthony Smith on April 10, 2026 in the main event of Gamebred promotions event in the Dominican Republic. He lost the bout via a rear-naked choke submission in the first round.

=== Karate Combat ===
Sherman competed in the 8-man heavyweight tournament July 18, 2025 at Karate Combat 55 and lost to Timothy Johnson by technical knockout in the first round.

== Bare-knuckle boxing ==
In the spring of 2019, Sherman signed a contract with the Bare Knuckle Fighting Championship. He faced Sam Shewmaker at BKFC 5 on April 6, 2019. The bout ended in a split draw.

In his second fight for the promotion, Sherman challenged Arnold Adams for the BKFC heavyweight title and Police Gazette Bare Knuckle title at BKFC 7 on August 10, 2019. He won the fight by unanimous decision.

Sherman was then set to defend the titles against Joey Beltran at BKFC 9 on November 16, 2019. After a hard-fought five rounds, Sherman lost the fight via unanimous decision.

== Dirty Boxing Career ==
In August 2025, Sherman signed with Mike Perry's "Dirty Boxing Championship" promotion, facing Levi da Costa at Dirty Boxing Championship 3. He was stepping in for Rakim Cleveland, who had been rescheduled to the main event. He lost via unanimous decision.

== Championships and accomplishments ==
=== Mixed martial arts ===
- Ultimate Fighting Championship
  - Fight of the Night (One time) vs. Rashad Coulter
  - Performance of the Night (One time) vs. Jared Vanderaa

=== Bare-knuckle boxing ===
- Bare Knuckle Fighting Championship
  - BKFC Heavyweight Championship (one time; former)
  - Police Gazette Heavyweight American Championship(one time; former)

== Mixed martial arts record ==
Professional record breakdown
32 matches	18 wins	14 losses
By knockout	17	4
By submission	0	4
By decision	1	6

Res.	Record	Opponent	Method	Event	Date	Round	Time	Location	Notes
Loss	18–14	Anthony Smith	Submission (rear-naked choke)	Gamebred Bareknuckle MMA 9	April 10, 2026	1	3:27	Santo Domingo, Dominican Republic	Gamebred FC Heavyweight Tournament Round of 16.
Loss	18–13	Maurice Greene	Submission (guillotine choke)	Gamebred Bareknuckle MMA 8	November 15, 2024	2	3:26	Biloxi, Mississippi, United States	Bare knuckle MMA.
Win	18–12	Alex Nicholson	KO (punch)	Gamebred Bareknuckle MMA 7	March 2, 2024	1	3:57	Orlando, Florida, United States	Bare knuckle MMA.
Win	17–12	Carl Seumanutafa	KO (elbow and punches)	Gamebred Bareknuckle MMA 6	November 10, 2023	1	2:34	Biloxi, Mississippi, United States	Bare knuckle MMA.
Loss	16–12	Karl Williams	Decision (unanimous)	UFC on ABC: Rozenstruik vs. Almeida	May 13, 2023	3	5:00	Charlotte, North Carolina, United States	
Loss	16–11	Waldo Cortes-Acosta	Decision (unanimous)	UFC Fight Night: Nzechukwu vs. Cuțelaba	November 19, 2022	3	5:00	Las Vegas, Nevada, United States	
Win	16–10	Jared Vanderaa	TKO (punches)	UFC on ESPN: dos Anjos vs. Fiziev	July 9, 2022	3	3:10	Las Vegas, Nevada, United States	Performance of the Night.
Loss	15–10	Alexander Romanov	Submission (keylock)	UFC on ESPN: Font vs. Vera	April 30, 2022	1	2:11	Las Vegas, Nevada, United States	
Loss	15–9	Jake Collier	Submission (rear-naked choke)	UFC on ESPN: Kattar vs. Chikadze	January 15, 2022	1	2:26	Las Vegas, Nevada, United States	
Loss	15–8	Parker Porter	Decision (unanimous)	UFC on ESPN: Cannonier vs. Gastelum	August 21, 2021	3	5:00	Las Vegas, Nevada, United States	
Loss	15–7	Andrei Arlovski	Decision (unanimous)	UFC on ESPN: Whittaker vs. Gastelum	April 17, 2021	3	5:00	Las Vegas, Nevada, United States	
Win	15–6	Ike Villanueva	TKO (punches and elbow)	UFC Fight Night: Smith vs. Teixeira	May 13, 2020	2	0:49	Jacksonville, Florida, United States	
Win	14–6	Rashaun Jackson	TKO (punches)	Island Fights 56	May 9, 2019	1	0:59	Orange Beach, Alabama, United States	
Win	13–6	Jeremy May	TKO (leg kicks)	Island Fights 52	February 7, 2019	1	3:18	Pensacola, Florida, United States	
Win	12–6	Frank Tate	TKO (punches)	Island Fights 51	December 21, 2018	1	4:05	Pensacola, Florida, United States	
Loss	11–6	Augusto Sakai	TKO (punches)	UFC Fight Night: Santos vs. Anders	September 22, 2018	3	4:03	São Paulo, Brazil	
Loss	11–5	Justin Willis	Decision (unanimous)	UFC Fight Night: Barboza vs. Lee	April 21, 2018	3	5:00	Atlantic City, New Jersey, United States	
Loss	11–4	Shamil Abdurakhimov	KO (punches)	UFC Fight Night: Bisping vs. Gastelum	November 25, 2017	1	1:24	Shanghai, China	
Win	11–3	Damian Grabowski	Decision (unanimous)	UFC on Fox: Weidman vs. Gastelum	July 22, 2017	3	5:00	Uniondale, New York, United States	
Win	10–3	Rashad Coulter	KO (elbow)	UFC 211	May 13, 2017	2	3:36	Dallas, Texas, United States	Fight of the Night.
Loss	9–3	Walt Harris	KO (knee and punch)	UFC Fight Night: Rodríguez vs. Penn	January 15, 2017	2	2:41	Phoenix, Arizona, United States	
Loss	9–2	Justin Ledet	Decision (unanimous)	UFC Fight Night: Rodríguez vs. Caceres	August 6, 2016	3	5:00	Salt Lake City, Utah, United States	
Win	9–1	Jack May	TKO (leg injury)	Titan FC 38	April 30, 2016	1	0:56	Miami, Florida, United States	
Win	8–1	Sammy Collingwood	KO (punches)	Island Fights 37	March 11, 2016	1	1:03	Pensacola, Florida, United States	
Win	7–1	Russ Johnson	KO (punch)	FFI: Blood and Sand 17	June 27, 2015	1	1:40	Biloxi, Mississippi, United States	
Win	6–1	Brad Johnson	TKO (punches)	FFI: Blood and Sand 16	March 14, 2015	1	1:00	Biloxi, Mississippi, United States	
Loss	5–1	Alex Nicholson	TKO (punches)	Island Fights 31	December 5, 2014	1	N/A	Pensacola, Florida, United States	
Win	5–0	Wes Little	TKO (punches)	FFI: Blood and Sand 15	November 1, 2014	1	4:00	Biloxi, Mississippi, United States	
Win	4–0	Alex Rozman	TKO (leg kick)	Island Fights 30	November 1, 2014	1	N/A	Pensacola, Florida, United States	
Win	3–0	Justin Thornton	TKO (punches)	Island Fights 28	May 9, 2014	1	1:01	Pensacola, Florida, United States	
Win	2–0	Chris Jensen	TKO (punches)	Atlas Fights: Battle on Mobile Bay	April 12, 2014	1	0:11	Mobile, Alabama, United States	
Win	1–0	Braxton Smith	TKO (punches)	V3 Fights: Johnson vs. Johnson	January 18, 2014	1	2:08	Memphis, Tennessee, United States	

== Professional boxing record ==
2 fights	1 win	1 loss
By knockout	0	1
By decision	1	0

No.	Result	Record	Opponent	Type	Round, time	Date	Location	Notes
2	Loss	1–1	Jimi Manuwa	TKO	2 (4), 1:52	Aug 29, 2026	Kia Center, Orlando, Florida, U.S.	
1	Win	1–0	Demarcus Kemp	UD	4	May 3, 2025	Biloxi Civic Center, Biloxi, Mississippi, U.S.	

== Bare knuckle record ==
Professional record breakdown
3 matches	1 win	1 loss
By decision	1	1
Draws	1	

Res.	Record	Opponent	Method	Event	Date	Round	Time	Location	Notes
Loss	1–1–1	Joey Beltran	Decision (unanimous)	BKFC 9	November 16, 2019	5	2:00	Biloxi, Mississippi, United States	Lost the BKFC Heavyweight Championship & Police Gazette Heavyweight American Championship.
Win	1–0–1	Arnold Adams	Decision (unanimous)	BKFC 7	August 10, 2019	5	2:00	Biloxi, Mississippi, United States	Won the BKFC Heavyweight Championship & Police Gazette Heavyweight American Championship.
Draw	0–0–1	Sam Shewmaker	Draw (split)	BKFC 5	April 6, 2019	5	2:00	Biloxi, Mississippi, United States	

== Karate Combat ==
Professional record breakdown
1 match	0 wins	1 loss
By knockout	0	1

Res.	Record	Opponent	Method	Event	Date	Round	Time	Location	Notes
Loss	0–1	Timothy Johnson	TKO (punches)	Karate Combat 55	July 18, 2025	1	0:26	Miami, Florida, United States	Last Man Standing Quarterfinal.

== Dirty Boxing Record ==
Res.	Record	Opponent	Method	Event	Date	Round	Time	Location	Notes
Loss	0-1	Levi da Costa	Decision (Unanimous)	Dirty Boxing Championship 3	August 29. 2025	3	3:00	The Hangar at Regatta Harbour, Miami, Florida, USA	Dirty Boxing Debut

== See also ==
- List of male mixed martial artists
