= John Allan (fighter) =

Brazilian mixed martial arts fighter

John Allan Arte
- Born: February 22, 1993 (age 33); Curitiba, Brazil
- Other names: The Hunter
- Height: 6 ft 1 in (1.85 m)
- Weight: 205 lb (93 kg; 14 st 9 lb)
- Division: Light Heavyweight; Middleweight
- Reach: 70.0 in (178 cm)
- Stance: Orthodox
- Fighting out of: Curitiba, Parana, Brazil
- Team: Chute Boxe Academy
- Years active: 2012–present

Mixed martial arts record
- Total: 29
- Wins: 18
- By knockout: 13
- By submission: 4
- By decision: 1
- Losses: 10
- By knockout: 2
- By submission: 4
- By decision: 4
- No contests: 1

Other information
- Mixed martial arts record from Sherdog

John Allan Arte (born February 22, 1993) is a Brazilian mixed martial artist who competes in the Light Heavyweight division. He formerly competed in the Ultimate Fighting Championship.

== Background ==
When Allan was 14 years old, he entered a Muay Thai gym with the goal of losing weight. He also took up Jiu-Jitsu classes when he was 17 and Before turning pro, he played amateur basketball from when he was 15 to 19 years old.

== Mixed martial arts career ==
=== Early career ===
Allan made his professional debut against Fabiano Rodrigues on September 15, 2012, losing his first MMA fight by heel hook in under a minute. He would go on to compile a 12–4 record on the Brazilian regional scene.

At Dana White's Contender Series Brazil 3 on August 11, 2018, Allan fell short to eventual contract-winner Vinicius Moreira via second-round triangle choke submission despite a successful first round that saw Allan bloody his fellow Brazilian.

At Future FC 6 on June 28, 2019, Allan defeated previously undefeated prospect Alexandre Silva via second-round TKO in a barnburner of a fight.

=== Ultimate Fighting Championship ===
Allan made his UFC debut against Mike Rodríguez on July 13, 2019, at UFC Fight Night: de Randamie vs. Ladd. He originally won the fight via unanimous decision. However, Allan tested positive for banned hormone and metabolic modulator tamoxifen for which he received a one-year USADA suspension, which began on began on July 13, 2019, and was fined $4,800 by the California State Athletic Commission which overruled the original decision to a no contest.

Allan, as a replacement for Gerald Meerschaert, was scheduled to face Ed Herman on September 12, 2020, at UFC Fight Night: Waterson vs. Hill. Allan was removed from the fight in early September as he faced travel restrictions related to the COVID-19 pandemic and was replaced by Mike Rodríguez.

Allan faced Roman Dolidze at UFC on ESPN: Hermansson vs. Vettori on December 5, 2020. He lost the bout via split decision; however 19 out of 19 media members scored it a 30-27 for Dolidze.

Allan was expected to face Aleksa Camur on November 6, 2021, at UFC 268. However, Camur pulled out of the bout citing an undisclosed injury and was replaced by Dustin Jacoby. Allan lost the bout via unanimous decision.

Allan was released by the UFC in November 2021 following his loss to Jacoby.

=== Post UFC ===
In his first appearance after his UFC release, Allan faced Diego Dias on September 25, 2022 at Fight Music Show 2. He lost the bout via unanimous decision.

Allan returned not long after against Marcos del Vigna on November 19, 2022 at Prime Fights 1, where he knocked him out in the first round.

Allan faced Ewerton Polaquini on March 19, 2023 at Imortal FC 12, winning the bout via guillotine choke in the first round.

Allan faced Tyago Moreira on November 18, 2023 at SFT 44, winning the bout via first round TKO stoppage.

== Championships and accomplishments ==
=== Mixed martial arts ===
- ShowFight
  - LHW Tournament Championship (One time)

== Mixed martial arts record ==
Professional record breakdown
28 matches	18 wins	10 losses
By knockout	13	2
By submission	4	4
By decision	1	4

Res.	Record	Opponent	Method	Event	Date	Round	Time	Location	Notes
Loss	18–10 (1)	James Webb	TKO (elbows and punches)	Cage Warriors 188	April 26, 2025	2	3:22	Dublin, Ireland	For the Cage Warriors Light Heavyweight Championship.
Win	18–9 (1)	Anderson Pereira	TKO (knees and punches)	BOPE Fight 2	October 26, 2024	1	3:50	Curitiba, Brazil	Catchweight (194 lb) bout.
Win	17–9 (1)	Claudio Rocha	TKO (punches)	Standout Fighting Tournament 50	August 17, 2024	1	2:49	São Paulo, Brazil	
Loss	16–9 (1)	Rafael Celestino	TKO (punches)	Standout Fighting Tournament 45	March 2, 2024	1	4:03	São Paulo, Brazil	
Win	16–8 (1)	Tyago Moreira	TKO (punches)	Standout Fighting Tournament 44	November 18, 2023	1	1:00	São Paulo, Brazil	
Win	15–8 (1)	Ewerton Polaquini	Submission (guillotine choke)	Imortal FC 12	March 19, 2023	1	1:45	Curitiba, Brazil	
Win	14–8 (1)	Marcos del Vigna	KO (punches)	Prime Fights 1	November 19, 2022	1	1:37	Campo Largo, Brazil	Return to Middleweight.
Loss	13–8 (1)	Diego Dias	Decision (unanimous)	Fight Music Show 2	September 25, 2022	3	5:00	Curitiba, Brazil	
Loss	13–7 (1)	Dustin Jacoby	Decision (unanimous)	UFC 268	November 6, 2021	3	5:00	New York City, New York, United States	
Loss	13–6 (1)	Roman Dolidze	Decision (split)	UFC on ESPN: Hermansson vs. Vettori	December 5, 2020	3	5:00	Las Vegas, Nevada, United States	
NC	13–5 (1)	Mike Rodriguez	NC (overturned)	UFC Fight Night: de Randamie vs. Ladd	July 13, 2019	3	5:00	Sacramento, California, United States	Originally a unanimous decision win for Allan; overturned after he tested positive for tamoxifen.
Win	13–5	Alexandre Silva	TKO (punches)	Future FC 6	June 28, 2019	2	1:33	São Paulo, Brazil	
Loss	12–5	Vinicius Moreira	Submission (triangle choke)	Dana White's Contender Series Brazil 3	August 11, 2018	2	3:40	Las Vegas, Nevada, United States	
Win	12–4	Edvaldo de Oliveira	Submission (arm-triangle choke)	Imortal FC 8	April 7, 2018	3	2:38	São José dos Pinhais, Brazil	
Win	11–4	Rafael Monteiro	TKO (punches)	Imortal FC 7	November 11, 2017	2	1:08	São José dos Pinhais, Brazil	
Win	10–4	Adilson Costa Ferreira	Decision (unanimous)	BFC: Maranhao vs. Curitiba	September 16, 2017	3	5:00	São Luís, Brazil	
Win	9–4	Matheus Scheffel	TKO (punches)	Samurai FC / PFE 13	June 11, 2016	1	4:36	Curitiba, Brazil	
Loss	8–4	Michał Fijałka	Submission (rear-naked choke)	XCage 9	April 9, 2016	2	1:11	Toruń, Poland	For the XC Light Heavyweight Championship.
Win	8–3	Alex Junius	TKO (punches)	Show Fight 31	March 24, 2016	1	0:00	Curitiba, Brazil	Won the SF Tournament Championship.
Win	7–3	Rafael Monteiro	TKO (retirement)	Show Fight 31	March 24, 2016	2	5:00	Curitiba, Brazil	Light Heavyweight debut.
Loss	6–3	Thiago Florindo	Submission (arm-triangle choke)	Frontline Fight Series 1	September 19, 2015	2	0:00	Curitiba, Brazil	
Win	6–2	Leonardo Gosling	TKO (punches)	University of Champions 5	June 27, 2015	1	1:18	Curitiba, Brazil	
Win	5–2	Bruno Marks	TKO	Curitiba Top Fight 9	March 1, 2015	1	2:04	Curitiba, Brazil	
Win	4–2	Tassio Bomfim de Paula Souza	Submission	Gladiator Combat Fight 8	October 11, 2014	1	1:55	Curitiba, Brazil	
Win	3–2	Leandro Frast	TKO (punches)	Curitiba Fight Pro 2	August 9, 2014	1	1:15	Curitiba, Brazil	
Loss	2–2	Rodrigo Jesus	Decision (unanimous)	Samurai Fight Combat / Power Fight Extreme 10	November 30, 2013	3	5:00	Curitiba, Brazil	
Win	2–1	Marcio Telles	Submission (heel hook)	Impactotal Fight 4	June 8, 2013	1	1:08	Garça, Brazil	
Win	1–1	Cezar Alves	TKO (punches)	Full Fight Combat	December 15, 2012	1	3:40	Venâncio Aires, Brazil	
Loss	0–1	Cesar Fabiano Rodrigues	Submission (heel hook)	Quality FC 1	September 15, 2012	1	0:48	Araçatuba, Brazil	Middleweight debut.

== See also ==
- List of male mixed martial artists
