= Mike Rodríguez (fighter) =

American mixed martial arts fighter

- Born: Michael Earl Rodríguez; November 28, 1988 (age 37); Dorchester, Boston, Massachusetts, United States
- Other names: Slow
- Nationality: American
- Height: 6 ft 3 in (1.91 m)
- Weight: 205 lb (93 kg; 14.6 st)
- Division: Light heavyweight Heavyweight
- Reach: 82.5 in (210 cm)
- Fighting out of: Boston, Massachusetts, United States
- Team: Lauzon MMA
- Rank: Blue belt in Brazilian Jiu-Jitsu
- Years active: 2014–present

Mixed martial arts record
- Total: 19
- Wins: 11
- By knockout: 9
- By submission: 2
- Losses: 7
- By knockout: 1
- By submission: 3
- By decision: 3
- No contests: 1

Other information
- Mixed martial arts record from Sherdog

Michael Earl Rodríguez (born November 28, 1988) is an American mixed martial artist currently competing in the heavyweight division. He formerly competed for the Ultimate Fighting Championship (UFC).

== Mixed martial arts career ==
=== Early career ===
Rodríguez started his professional MMA career in 2013 and fought under Classic Entertainment & Sports (CES MMA) and Cage Titans promoters in the northeast region of United States. He achieved a record of 8–2 in Dana White's Contender Series.

=== Dana White's Contender Series ===
Rodríguez appeared in Dana White's Contender Series 5 web-series program, facing Jamelle Jones on August 8, 2017. He won the fight via a flying-knee knockout and earned a UFC contract.

=== Ultimate Fighting Championship ===
Rodríguez made his UFC debut on April 7, 2018, at UFC 223, facing Devin Clark. He lost the fight by unanimous decision.

Rodríguez's second UFC fight was on December 15, 2018, at UFC on Fox: Lee vs. Iaquinta 2 against Adam Milstead. He won the fight via TKO in the first round.

Rodríguez faced John Allan on July 13, 2019, at UFC Fight Night: de Randamie vs. Ladd. He originally lost the fight via unanimous decision, however, Allan tested positive for a banned hormone and metabolic modulator tamoxifen for which he received a one-year USADA suspension and was fined $4,800 by the California State Athletic Commission which overruled the original decision to a no contest.

Rodríguez faced Da Un Jung on December 21, 2019, at UFC Fight Night 165. He lost the fight via knockout in the first round.

Rodríguez faced Marcin Prachnio on August 22, 2020, at UFC on ESPN 15. He won the fight via knockout in the first round.

Rodríguez faced Ed Herman on September 12, 2020, at UFC Fight Night 177. He lost the fight via a kimura in round three. Due to a controversial decision by the referee to pause the fight in the second round after mistaking a clean shot from Rodríguez for a low blow, the organization awarded Rodríguez his win bonus despite the loss. Subsequently, Rodríguez's team also appealed the loss with the NSAC. In turn, the request for an appeal was denied.

Rodríguez faced Danilo Marques on February 6, 2021, at UFC Fight Night 184. He lost the fight via rear-naked choke in round two.

Rodríguez faced Tafon Nchukwi on September 18, 2021, at UFC Fight Night 192. He lost the fight via unanimous decision.

After the loss, Rodríguez was released by the UFC.

== Mixed martial arts record ==
Professional record breakdown
19 matches	11 wins	7 losses
By knockout	9	1
By submission	2	3
By decision	0	3
No contests	1	

Res.	Record	Opponent	Method	Event	Date	Round	Time	Location	Notes
Win	12–7 (1)	Jeremy May	TKO (elbows)	CES 69	June 17, 2022	1	3:25	Lincoln, Rhode Island, United States	Heavyweight debut.
Loss	11–7 (1)	Tafon Nchukwi	Decision (unanimous)	UFC Fight Night: Smith vs. Spann	September 18, 2021	3	5:00	Las Vegas, Nevada, United States	
Loss	11–6 (1)	Danilo Marques	Technical Submission (rear-naked choke)	UFC Fight Night: Overeem vs. Volkov	February 6, 2021	2	4:52	Las Vegas, Nevada, United States	
Loss	11–5 (1)	Ed Herman	Submission (kimura)	UFC Fight Night: Waterson vs. Hill	September 12, 2020	3	4:01	Las Vegas, Nevada, United States	
Win	11–4 (1)	Marcin Prachnio	KO (elbow and punches)	UFC on ESPN: Munhoz vs. Edgar	August 22, 2020	1	2:17	Las Vegas, Nevada, United States	
Loss	10–4 (1)	Da Un Jung	KO (punches)	UFC Fight Night: Edgar vs. The Korean Zombie	December 21, 2019	1	1:04	Busan, South Korea	
NC	10–3 (1)	John Allan	NC (overturned)	UFC Fight Night: de Randamie vs. Ladd	July 13, 2019	3	5:00	Sacramento, California, United States	Scored a decision win for Arte; overturned as he tested positive for tamoxifen.
Win	10–3	Adam Milstead	TKO (knee to the body and punches)	UFC on Fox: Lee vs. Iaquinta 2	December 15, 2018	1	2:59	Milwaukee, Wisconsin, United States	
Loss	9–3	Devin Clark	Decision (unanimous)	UFC 223	April 7, 2018	3	5:00	Brooklyn, New York, United States	
Win	9–2	Jamelle Jones	KO (flying knee)	Dana White's Contender Series 5	August 8, 2017	1	2:15	Las Vegas, Nevada, United States	
Win	8–2	Alec Hooben	TKO (punches and elbows)	CES MMA 44	May 12, 2017	1	4:46	Lincoln, Rhode Island, United States	
Win	7–2	James Dysard	TKO (punches)	CES MMA 43	April 15, 2017	1	0:39	Beverly, Massachusetts, United States	
Win	6–2	Hector Sanchez	KO (punches)	CES MMA 41	January 27, 2017	1	0:07	Lincoln, Rhode Island, United States	
Loss	5–2	Kevin Haley	Submission (toe hold)	CES MMA 39	November 4, 2016	1	1:08	Plymouth, Massachusetts, United States	Light Heavyweight debut.
Win	5–1	John Poppie	Submission (triangle choke)	CES MMA 38	September 23, 2016	2	1:32	Lincoln, Rhode Island, United States	Catchweight (192 lb) bout.
Win	4–1	Stephond Ewins	KO (flying knee)	CES MMA 37	August 12, 2016	1	3:38	Lincoln, Rhode Island, United States	Catchweight (200 lb) bout.
Win	3–1	Buck Pineau	Submission (rear-naked choke)	CES MMA 35	April 16, 2016	2	4:03	Beverly, Massachusetts, United States	
Loss	2–1	Pat McCrohan	Decision (unanimous)	CES MMA 32	January 8, 2016	3	5:00	Lincoln, Rhode Island, United States	
Win	2–0	Stephen Stengel	TKO (punches)	Cage Titans 21	November 1, 2014	1	1:22	Plymouth, Massachusetts, United States	
Win	1–0	Ralph Johnson	TKO (retirement)	Cage Titans 18	May 5, 2014	1	3:50	Plymouth, Massachusetts, United States	Middleweight debut.

== See also ==
- List of male mixed martial artists
