= Kody Mommaerts =

US sports announcer and voice actor (born 1995)

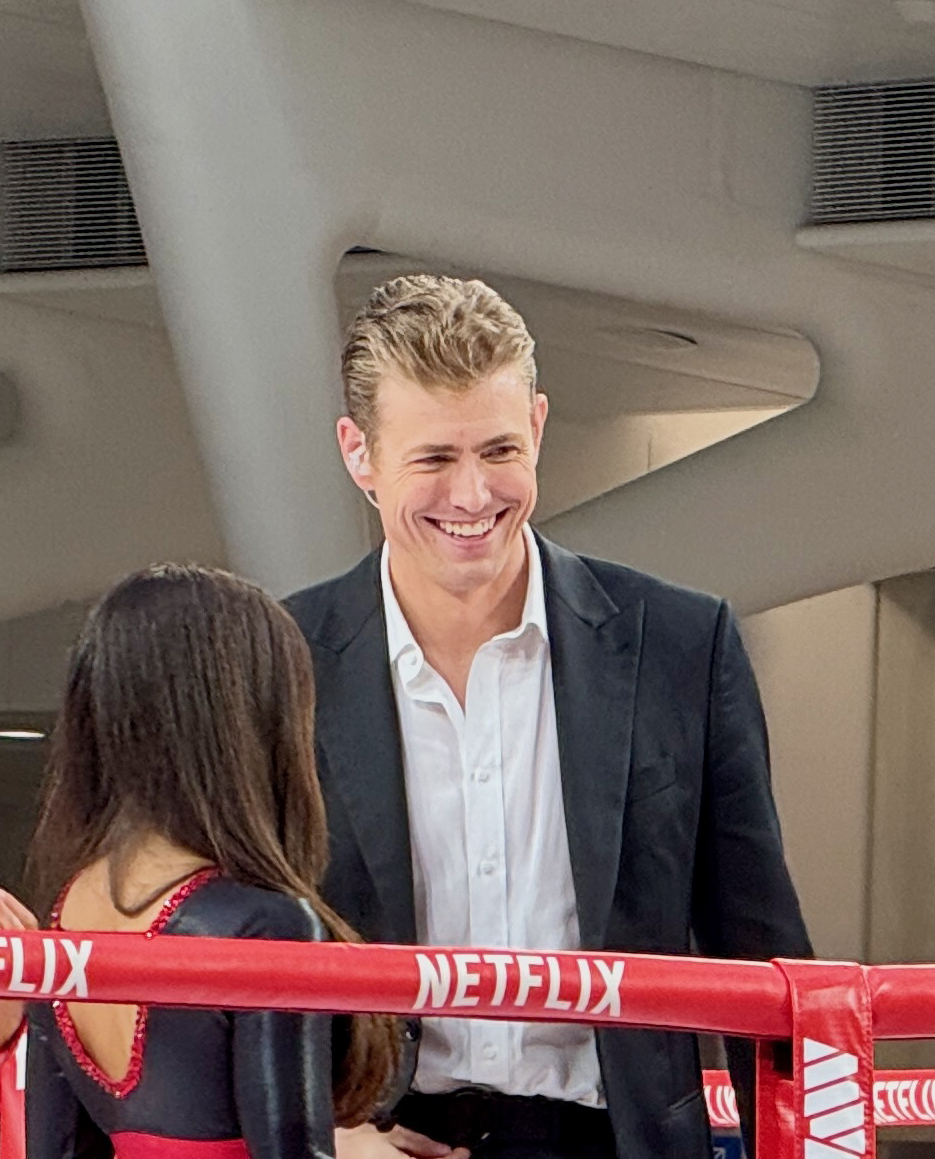
- Kody Mommaerts in 2025
- Born: October 23, 1995 (age 30); Oceanside, California, United States
- Other name: Big Mo
- Occupation: Ring announcer
- Years active: 2019–present
- Height: 1.98 m (6 ft 6 in)
- Website: ThisIsBigMo.com

Kody Mommaerts (born October 23, 1995), more commonly known as Big Mo, is an American entertainer and combat sports ring announcer. He is currently the official Ring Announcer for the boxing promotion BOXXER, which airs on Sky Sports, and BKB Bare Knuckle Boxing, which airs on Vice TV and Fuse.

== Biography ==
Kody Robert Mommaerts was born in Oceanside, California, on October 23, 1995. From an early age, he was very involved in sports and athletics. He first trained in Shotokan karate, which began his love for martial arts. He trained in the discipline for nearly seven years alongside karatekas such as Kamran Madani.

Mommaerts attended Monarch High School in Louisville, Colorado, where he played American football as an offensive lineman. After winning a state championship in 2013, he played college football at the Division I level and attended the University of Northern Colorado. He also attended the University of Northern Colorado, where he played football for five years as an offensive lineman, in a backup role. He graduated early with a bachelor's degree in Business Marketing from the Monfort College of Business. With football eligibility still remaining, he earned a master's degree in Business Administration. Mommaerts was also an award-winning student, competing in, and winning, international business competitions.

== Ring announcing career ==
=== Boxing ===
Big Mo is currently the official ring announcer for the boxing promotion BOXXER, owned by promoter Ben Shalom, which broadcasts on Sky Sports.

Mommaerts also announced the Eddie Hall vs. Hafþór Björnsson fight in Dubai in March 2022.

Mommaerts was the ring announcer for Netflix's 1st live sporting event Jake Paul vs. Mike Tyson on November 15, 2024.

=== Bareknuckle ===
Big Mo is currently the Ring Announcer for BKB Bare Knuckle Boxing.

=== Mixed martial arts ===
Mommaerts' first job was with Sparta Sports & Entertainment, where he was brought on as a color commentator. Shortly after, he took over the ring announcer role. He is also the ring announcer for XMMA.

=== Lethwei ===
On November 7, 2020, Mommaerts was the announcer for Dave Leduc vs. Cyrus Washington II. The match was the first-ever Lethwei fight in North America, and was held in Cheyenne, Wyoming at the Outlaw Saloon. The fight featured Canadian-Burmese world champion Dave Leduc defending the Lethwei Golden Belt against American Cyrus Washington.

== Notable fights announced ==
The following is a partial list of major combat sports events announced by Mommaerts. These events were selected based on their international broadcast reach, headlining matchups, and significance within professional boxing or combat sports.

Date	Event	Location	Venue	Broadcaster
19 March 2022	Eddie Hall vs. Hafþór Björnsson	Dubai, United Arab Emirates	Dubai Duty Free Tennis Stadium	Core Sports
15 October 2022	Claressa Shields vs. Savannah Marshall	London, England	The O2 Arena	Sky Sports PPV
21 January 2023	Chris Eubank Jr. vs. Liam Smith	Manchester, England	Manchester Arena	Sky Sports PPV
27 May 2023	Chris Billam-Smith vs. Lawrence Okolie	Bournemouth, England	Vitality Stadium	Sky Sports
2 September 2023	Liam Smith vs. Chris Eubank Jr. II	Manchester, England	Manchester Arena	Sky Sports PPV
15 June 2024	Chris Billam-Smith vs. Richard Riakporhe II	London, England	Selhurst Park	Sky Sports
15 November 2024	Jake Paul vs. Mike Tyson	Arlington, Texas	AT&T Stadium	Netflix
7 March 2025	Natasha Jonas vs. Lauren Price	London, England	Royal Albert Hall	Sky Sports
28 June 2025	Jake Paul vs. Julio César Chávez Jr.	Anaheim, California	Honda Center	DAZN PPV
11 July 2025	Katie Taylor vs. Amanda Serrano III	New York, New York	Madison Square Garden	Netflix

== Filmography ==
Year	Title	Role
2022	Mike	Announcer
2022–present	Sky Sports Boxing	Big Mo (himself)
2024	Jake Paul vs. Mike Tyson	Big Mo (himself)

== Awards and honors ==
In 2024, Mommaerts was named to Sports Illustrated's Boxing 30 Under 30 Power List.

He was named the "Bareknuckle Ring Announcer of the Year" by the Bare Knuckle Boxing Hall of Fame in 2023.

After his first year in the industry, Mommaerts was named the "2019 Ring Announcer on the Rise" by The Scrap News. He received the recognition again in 2020.
