= Vinicius Moreira =

Brazilian mixed martial arts fighter

- Born: Vinicius Moreira Castro; February 28, 1989 (age 37); Planaltina, Federal District, Brazil
- Other names: Mamute
- Height: 6 ft 4 in (1.93 m)
- Weight: 205 lb (93 kg; 14 st 9 lb)
- Division: Light heavyweight Heavyweight
- Reach: 76 in (193 cm)
- Style: BJJ
- Fighting out of: Brasília, Federal District, Brazil
- Team: Five Rounds
- Rank: Black belt in Brazilian jiu-jitsu
- Years active: 2015–present

Mixed martial arts record
- Total: 25
- Wins: 16
- By knockout: 3
- By submission: 13
- Losses: 9
- By knockout: 5
- By submission: 1
- By decision: 3

Other information
- Mixed martial arts record from Sherdog

Vinicius Moreira Castro (born February 28, 1989) is a Brazilian mixed martial artist currently competing in the Light heavyweight division. He is most known for his time spent fighting in the Ultimate Fighting Championship (UFC).

== Background ==
Inspired by Minotauro Nogueira's fights in Pride FC, Moreira started training jiu-jitsu in 2006 as his first martial art. After growing unmotivated by jiu-jitsu, he started training mixed martial arts in 2015, making his professional debut in the following year.

== Mixed martial arts career ==
=== Early career ===
Moreira began his MMA career by compiling an MMA record of 8–1 by competing mainly within the Brazilian regional MMA circuit as well as in India for Super Fight League.

=== Dana White's Contender Series Brazil ===
Moreira faced John Allan on August 11, 2018, at Dana White's Contender Series Brazil 3. He won the fight via submission with a triangle choke and was awarded with a UFC contract.

=== Ultimate Fighting Championship ===
Moreira made his UFC debut against Alonzo Menifield on January 19, 2019, at UFC Fight Night: Cejudo vs. Dillashaw. He lost the fight via technical knockout due to punches in the first round.

Moreira then faced Eryk Anders on June 29, 2019, at UFC on ESPN: Ngannou vs. dos Santos. He lost the fight via knockout due to punches in the first round.

Moreira next faced Paul Craig on September 21, 2019, at UFC Fight Night: Rodríguez vs. Stephens. He lost the fight via submission with a rear-naked choke in the first round.

Moreira was scheduled to face Tyson Pedro on February 23, 2020, at UFC Fight Night: Felder vs. Hooker. However, Pedro withdrew from the bout in early January due to an undisclosed injury.

Moreira was expected to face Modestas Bukauskas on July 15, 2020, at UFC Fight Night 172. However, on July 3, Moreira tested positive for COVID-19 and was removed from the event.

On January 15, Moreira received a public warning by USADA due to an out-of-competition positive test for anastrozole in September 2020. He had provided a supplement that was proven to be tainted with the substance.

Moreira was scheduled to face Ike Villanueva on January 30, 2021, at UFC Fight Night 186. In late December 2020, the UFC opted against holding an event on a planned January 30 date and decided to reschedule several bouts to January 20, 2021, at UFC on ESPN: Magny vs. Chiesa. He lost the fight by knockout in the second round.

On February 4, 2021, it was announced that Moreira was released from his UFC contract.

=== Post UFC ===
Moreira made his first appearance after his UFC release against Rodrigo Duarte on August 8, 2021, at Brazilian Fighting Series 1. He won the bout after the bout was stopped by the doctor after the first round.

Moreira faced Aleksandr Maslov at Open Fight Championship 9 on August 27, 2021, for the OFC Heavyweight Championship. He lost the bout via unanimous decision.

Moreira faced Mikhail Mokhnatkin on December 19, 2021, at Open Fighting Championship 15. He lost via unanimous decision.

Moreira returned against Sergey Dyakonov at MMA Series 53 on June 24, 2022. He lost the bout via unanimous decision.

Moreira faced Maico Machado for the inaugural SC Light Heavyweight Championship at "Soldado Combat 3" on August 24, 2024 and won the championship by first round arm-triangle choke submission.

== Championships and accomplishments ==
- Jungle Fight
  - Jungle Fight Light Heavyweight Championship (One time; current)
- Fam Fight MMA
  - FFMMA Heavyweight Championship (One time)
- Soldado Combat
  - SC Light Heavyweight Championship (First, inaugural, current)

== Mixed martial arts record ==
Professional record breakdown
25 matches	16 wins	9 losses
By knockout	3	5
By submission	13	1
By decision	0	3

Res.	Record	Opponent	Method	Event	Date	Round	Time	Location	Notes
Win	16–9	Luiz Carlos Alves	Submission (arm-triangle choke)	BSB Fight 3	December 12, 2025	1	2:16	Brasília, Brazil	Defended the BSB Fight Heavyweight Championship.
Win	15–9	Daniel Bucher	TKO (retirement)	BSB Fight 2	September 20, 2025	1	2:27	Brasília, Brazil	Won the inaugural BSB Fight Heavyweight Championship.
Loss	14–9	Tanner Boser	TKO (retirement)	UAE Warriors 60	June 13, 2025	3	1:55	Abu Dhabi, United Arab Emirates	
Win	14–8	Andre Miranda	Submission (kneebar)	Jungle Fight 131	October 19, 2024	3	0:26	Brasília, Brazil	Won the Jungle Fight Heavyweight Championship.
Win	13–8	Maico Machado	Submission (arm-triangle choke)	Soldado Combat 3	August 24, 2024	1	1:23	Brasília, Brazil	Won the inaugural SC Light Heavyweight Championship.
Win	12–8	Daniel Bucher	Submission (rear-naked choke)	Soldado Combat 1	February 4, 2024	1	1:04	Brasília, Brazil	
Win	11–8	Willian Roberto Alves	Submission (armbar)	Fight Music Show: Fight Night	May 12, 2023	1	0:53	Curitiba, Brazil	
Loss	10–8	Sergey Dyakonov	Decision (unanimous)	MMA Series 53	June 24, 2022	3	5:00	Moscow, Russia	
Loss	10–7	Mikhail Mokhnatkin	Decision (unanimous)	Open FC 15	December 19, 2021	3	5:00	Moscow, Russia	
Loss	10–6	Aleksandr Maslov	Decision (unanimous)	Open FC 9	August 27, 2021	3	5:00	Ekaterinburg, Russia	For the Open FC Heavyweight Championship.
Win	10–5	Rodrigo Duarte	TKO (doctor stoppage)	Brazilian Fighting Series 1	August 8, 2021	1	5:00	Rio de Janeiro, Brazil	Return to Heavyweight.
Loss	9–5	Ike Villanueva	KO (punch)	UFC on ESPN: Magny vs. Chiesa	January 20, 2021	2	0:39	Abu Dhabi, United Arab Emirates	
Loss	9–4	Paul Craig	Submission (rear-naked choke)	UFC Fight Night: Rodríguez vs. Stephens	September 21, 2019	1	3:19	Mexico City, Mexico	
Loss	9–3	Eryk Anders	KO (punches)	UFC on ESPN: Ngannou vs. dos Santos	June 29, 2019	1	1:18	Minneapolis, Minnesota, United States	
Loss	9–2	Alonzo Menifield	TKO (punches)	UFC Fight Night: Cejudo vs. Dillashaw	January 19, 2019	1	3:56	Brooklyn, New York, United States	
Win	9–1	John Allan	Submission (triangle choke)	Dana White's Contender Series Brazil 3	August 11, 2018	2	3:40	Las Vegas, Nevada, United States	
Win	8–1	Jason Radcliffe	Submission (arm-triangle choke)	Super Fight League 2018 Semi-Finals: Haryana Sultans vs. U.P. Nawabs	March 11, 2018	1	4:07	Mumbai, India	
Win	7–1	Sachin Kumar	Submission (armbar)	Super Fight League 2018: Sher-E-Punjab vs. Haryana Sultans	March 2, 2018	1	1:24	Mumbai, India	
Win	6–1	Amit Thapa	Submission (rear-naked choke)	Super Fight League 2018: Haryana Sultans vs. Mumbai Maniacs	February 17, 2018	1	1:05	Mumbai, India	
Win	5–1	José Aparecido Santos Gomes	Submission (arm-triangle choke)	Super Fight League 2018: Haryana Sultans vs. Bengaluru Tigers	February 10, 2018	2	N/A	Mumbai, India	Return to Light Heavyweight.
Loss	4–1	Rafael Celestino	KO (punches)	Shooto Brazil 77	October 27, 2017	1	2:27	Brasília, Brazil	Catchweight (195 lb) bout.
Win	4–0	Renan Ferreira	Submission (armbar)	FAM Fight Night 1	September 3, 2016	1	3:37	Goiânia, Brazil	Won the inaugural FFMMA Heavyweight Championship.
Win	3–0	Vinicius Lima	Submission (keylock)	The Warriors Combat 3	August 13, 2016	2	4:39	Brasília, Brazil	Heavyweight debut.
Win	2–0	Gustavo Moralis	TKO (punches)	Magal Fight 1	April 16, 2016	1	1:54	Alexânia, Brazil	
Win	1–0	Gabriel Scheufler	Submission (rear-naked choke)	Fight K Águia 1	October 11, 2015	1	2:57	Gama, Brazil	Light Heavyweight debut.

== See also ==
- List of male mixed martial artists
