= Matt Van Buren =

American mixed martial artist (born 1986)

- Born: June 12, 1986 (age 40); Chesapeake, Virginia, United States
- Other names: Gutter
- Nationality: American
- Height: 6 ft 5 in (1.96 m)
- Weight: 205 lb (93 kg; 14.6 st)
- Division: Light Heavyweight
- Reach: 77 in (196 cm)
- Fighting out of: Chula Vista, California, United States
- Team: Alliance MMA
- Rank: Blue belt in Brazilian Jiu-Jitsu
- Years active: 2010–present

Mixed martial arts record
- Total: 13
- Wins: 7
- By knockout: 2
- By submission: 2
- By decision: 3
- Losses: 6
- By knockout: 4
- By submission: 1
- By decision: 1

Other information
- Mixed martial arts record from Sherdog

Matt Van Buren (born June 12, 1986) is an American mixed martial artist who competed in the light heavyweight division for the Ultimate Fighting Championship. Van Buren has also fought for Bellator and was a finalist on The Ultimate Fighter 19.

== Mixed martial arts career ==
=== Early career ===
Van Buren made his debut in 2010, he won his first three bouts against Manny Okorie, Aaron Johnson and Brandon Saling.

=== Bellator ===
Van Buren made his Bellator debut in October 2011, defeating Nick Nichols via TKO in the second round at Bellator 52.

The following November, Van Buren faced Shawn Levesque at Bellator 57. Van Buren won via rear-naked choke submission in the first round.

Van Buren then fought Mike Mucitelli on August 24, 2012, at Bellator 73. Van Buren lost via submission in the first round.

On November 30, 2012, Van Buren faced Terry Davinney at Bellator 82 and lost via KO in just 15 seconds.

=== Post-Bellator ===
After his run in Bellator, Van Buren faced Mojtaba Najim Wali on July 20, 2013, at Gladiators of the Cage: The North Shore's Rise to Power 2. Van Buren won via unanimous decision breaking his two fight losing streak.

=== The Ultimate Fighter ===
On March 25, 2014, it was announced that Van Buren would appear on The Ultimate Fighter: Team Edgar vs. Team Penn.

In the fight to get into the house, Van Buren faced Daniel Vizcaya. Van Buren won via KO and was picked by Frankie Edgar to be on his team.

Van Buren then faced Chris Fields in the elimination round. Despite being rocked with a punch in the second round by Fields, Van Buren won via unanimous decision and moved on to the semifinals.

In the semifinals, Van Buren faced Daniel Spohn. After being rocked twice in the fight, Van Buren came back and won the fight via TKO in the second round.

=== Ultimate Fighting Championship ===
In the finals of The Ultimate Fighter 19, Van Buren faced Corey Anderson at The Ultimate Fighter 19 Finale on July 6, 2014. Van Buren lost the bout via TKO in the first round.

Van Buren faced Sean O'Connell on January 18, 2015, at UFC Fight Night 59. He lost the fight via TKO in the third round. Despite the loss, he was awarded a Fight of the Night bonus award.

Van Buren was briefly linked to a bout with Jonathan Wilson on August 8, 2015, at UFC Fight Night 74. However, Van Buren was removed from the card in early June citing injury and replaced by Jared Cannonier.

In October 2015 Van Buren was released by the UFC.

== Championships and accomplishments ==
=== Mixed martial arts ===
- Ultimate Fighting Championship
  - The Ultimate Fighter 19 (Runner-Up)
  - Fight of the Night (One time) vs. Sean O'Connell

== Mixed martial arts record ==
Professional record breakdown
13 matches	7 wins	6 losses
By knockout	2	4
By submission	2	1
By decision	3	1

Res.	Record	Opponent	Method	Event	Date	Round	Time	Location	Notes
Loss	7–6	Todd Stoute	Decision (Unanimous)	BTC 1 - Genesis	May 27, 2017	3	5:00	Toronto, Canada	
Loss	7–5	Jeremy Kimball	KO (Punch)	FFC 24 - Villefort vs. Rela	June 3, 2016	1	0:14	Daytona Beach, Florida, United States	
Win	7–4	Derrick Weaver	Submission (arm-triangle choke)	Elite Warrior Challenge 9: Takeover	February 6, 2016	2	3:38	Salem, Virginia, United States	
Loss	6–4	Sean O'Connell	TKO (punches)	UFC Fight Night: McGregor vs. Siver	January 18, 2015	3	2:11	Boston, Massachusetts, United States	Fight of the Night.
Loss	6–3	Corey Anderson	TKO (punches)	The Ultimate Fighter: Team Edgar vs. Team Penn Finale	July 6, 2014	1	1:01	Las Vegas, Nevada, United States	The Ultimate Fighter 19 Light Heavyweight tournament final.
Win	6–2	Mojtaba Najim Wali	Decision (unanimous)	Gladiators of the Cage: The North Shore's Rise to Power 2	July 20, 2013	3	5:00	Pittsburgh, Pennsylvania, United States	
Loss	5–2	Terry Davinney	KO (punch)	Bellator 82	November 30, 2012	1	0:15	Mount Pleasant, Michigan, United States	
Loss	5–1	Mike Mucitelli	Submission (triangle choke)	Bellator 73	August 24, 2012	1	3:01	Tunica, Mississippi, United States	
Win	5–0	Shawn Levesque	Submission (rear-naked choke)	Bellator 57	November 12, 2011	1	4:38	Rama, Ontario, Canada	
Win	4–0	Nick Nichols	TKO (punches)	Bellator 52	October 1, 2011	2	2:29	Lake Charles, Louisiana, United States	
Win	3–0	Brandon Saling	Decision (unanimous)	Fight Night in the Cage 2	May 28, 2011	3	5:00	Lancaster, Pennsylvania, United States	
Win	2–0	Aaron Johnson	KO (punches)	Black and Blue Entertainment: Rebel Invasion	October 23, 2010	1	N/A	Tallapoosa, Georgia, United States	
Win	1–0	Manny Okorie	Decision (majority)	Washington Combat: Battle of the Legends	May 15, 2010	3	5:00	Washington D.C., United States	

== Mixed martial arts exhibition record ==
Exhibition record breakdown		
3 matches	3 wins	0 losses
By knockout	2	0
By decision	1	0

Res.	Record	Opponent	Method	Event	Date	Round	Time	Location	Notes
Win	3–0	Daniel Spohn	TKO (punches)	The Ultimate Fighter: Team Edgar vs. Team Penn	Jul 2, 2014 (airdate)	2	1:47	Las Vegas, Nevada, United States	The Ultimate Fighter 19 Semi-final round.
Win	2–0	Chris Fields	Decision (majority)	The Ultimate Fighter: Team Edgar vs. Team Penn	Jun 11, 2014 (airdate)	2	5:00	Las Vegas, Nevada, United States	The Ultimate Fighter 19 Quarterfinal round.
Win	1–0	Daniel Vizcaya	TKO (elbows)	The Ultimate Fighter: Team Edgar vs. Team Penn	Apr 16, 2014 (airdate)	1	1:15	Las Vegas, Nevada, United States	The Ultimate Fighter 19 Elimination round.

== See also ==
- List of current UFC fighters
- List of male mixed martial artists
