= Ike Villanueva =

American mixed martial arts fighter

Isaac Villanueva
- Born: Isaac James Villanueva; April 4, 1984 (age 42); Houston, United States
- Other names: Hurricane Ike
- Height: 6 ft 3 in (191 cm)
- Weight: 205 lb (93 kg; 14 st 9 lb)
- Division: Heavyweight; Light Heavyweight; Middleweight
- Reach: 73 in (185 cm)
- Stance: Orthodox
- Fighting out of: Houston, Texas
- Team: Silverback Fight Club (formerly); 4oz. Fight Club; Metro Fight Club
- Years active: 2008–present

Mixed martial arts record
- Total: 32
- Wins: 18
- By knockout: 15
- By decision: 3
- Losses: 14
- By knockout: 8
- By submission: 5
- By decision: 1

Other information
- Mixed martial arts record from Sherdog

Isaac "Ike" James Villanueva (born April 4, 1984), is an American mixed martial artist and bare-knuckle boxer who competes in the Heavyweight division of BKB Bare Knuckle Boxing and competed in the Light Heavyweight division of the Ultimate Fighting Championship. He is a former BYB Heavyweight Champion.

== Mixed martial arts career ==
=== Early career ===
Starting his career in 2008, Villanueva compiled a 17–9 record fighting for various Texas regional promotions. During this time, he would lose to future UFC fighters, Cody Donovan, Justin Ledet, and Trevin Giles, as well lose to accomplished IBJJF World Championship and the ADCC Submission Wrestling World Championship winner, Robert Drysdale, who he would lose to by first round submission.

He also knocked out UFC vet Roger Narvaez in 28 seconds at Fury FC 36 on August 30, 2019, which won him the Fury FC Light Heavyweight Championship.

He would defend this title against just released from the UFC, Rashad Coulter at Fury FC 40 on December 13, 2019. After knocking down Coulter early in the fight, he eventually finished him by technical knockout later in the round.

=== Ultimate Fighting Championship ===
Villanueva made his UFC debut against Chase Sherman on May 13, 2020, at UFC Fight Night: Smith vs. Teixeira. Being outclassed on the feet, Villanueva lost the fight via technical knockout in round two. After the fight Sherman received nine month USADA suspension for testing positive for Anastrozole from a in-competition sample collected on May 13, 2020.

Villanueva was expected to face Jorge Gonzalez on August 15, 2020, at UFC 252. However, due to alleged visa issues for Gonzalez, the pairing was rescheduled for UFC on ESPN: Munhoz vs. Edgar on August 22, 2020. In turn, Gonzalez was removed from the card for undisclosed reasons and replaced by promotional newcomer Jordan Wright. Isaac lost in the first round after being cut badly, leading to a doctor's stoppage.

Villanueva was scheduled to face Vinicius Moreira on January 30, 2021. In late December 2020, the UFC opted against holding an event on a planned January 30 date and decided to reschedule several bouts to January 20, 2021, at UFC on ESPN: Chiesa vs. Magny.

Villanueva faced Vinicius Moreira on January 20, 2021, at UFC on ESPN: Chiesa vs. Magny. He won the fight via knockout in the second round.

As the first bout of his new four-fight contract, Villaneuva faced Marcin Prachnio on June 26, 2021, at UFC Fight Night 190. He lost the fight via TKO in the second round after being kicked in the liver.

Villanueva faced Nicolae Negumereanu on October 23, 2021, at UFC Fight Night: Costa vs. Vettori. He lost the fight via TKO in round one. Though there was controversy as replays showed Negumereanu landing illegal strikes to the back of Villanueva's head after the knockdown that led to the finish.

Villanueva faced Tyson Pedro on April 23, 2022, at UFC Fight Night 205. He lost the fight via knockout in the first round.

On May 6, 2022, it was announced that Villanueva was no longer on the UFC roster.

== Personal life ==
Isaac worked a day job as a CNC machinist outside of his fighting career, before he signed with the UFC. He has two sons born in 2014 and a daughter, born in September 2020.

== Championships and achievements ==
=== Bare-knuckle boxing ===
- BKB Bare Knuckle Boxing
  - BYB Heavyweight Champion (One Time)

=== Mixed martial arts ===
- Fury Fighting Championship
  - Fury FC Light Heavyweight Championship (One Time)
    - One successful defense

== Bare-knuckle boxing record ==
Professional record breakdown
6 matches	4 wins	2 losses
By knockout	4	2

Res.	Record	Opponent	Method	Event	Date	Round	Time	Location	Notes
Win	4–2	Eric Olsen	TKO	BKB 42: Music City Brawl	June 21, 2025	1		Nashville, Tennessee, United States	
Loss	3–2	Kamil Sokolowski	TKO	BYB 33: Wolverhampton Brawl	November 9, 2024	1		Wolverhampton, United Kingdom	
Loss	3–1	Gustavo Trujillo	KO	BYB 28: Bourbon Street Brawl	July 13, 2024	1		New Orleans, Louisiana, United States	Lost BYB Heavyweight Championship and for the Police Gazette World Diamond Belt.
Win	3–0	DJ Linderman	TKO	BYB 24: Super Brawl Saturday	February 10, 2024	4	1:46	Biloxi, Mississippi, United States	Won BYB Heavyweight Championship
Win	2–0	Jay Fish	TKO	BYB 22: Rocky Mountain Brawl	December 2, 2023	1	2:22	Denver, Colorado, United States	
Win	1–0	Matt Kovacs	TKO	BYB 20: Brawl in the Bayou	September 16, 2023	1	2:03	Biloxi, Mississippi, United States	

== Mixed martial arts record ==
Professional record breakdown
32 matches	18 wins	14 losses
By knockout	15	8
By submission	0	5
By decision	3	1

Res.	Record	Opponent	Method	Event	Date	Round	Time	Location	Notes
Loss	18–14	Tyson Pedro	KO (leg kick and punches)	UFC Fight Night: Lemos vs. Andrade	April 23, 2022	1	4:55	Las Vegas, Nevada, United States	
Loss	18–13	Nicolae Negumereanu	TKO (punches)	UFC Fight Night: Costa vs. Vettori	October 23, 2021	1	1:18	Las Vegas, Nevada, United States	
Loss	18–12	Marcin Prachnio	KO (body kick)	UFC Fight Night: Gane vs. Volkov	June 26, 2021	2	0:56	Las Vegas, Nevada, United States	
Win	18–11	Vinicius Moreira	KO (punch)	UFC on ESPN: Chiesa vs. Magny	January 20, 2021	2	0:39	Abu Dhabi, United Arab Emirates	
Loss	17–11	Jordan Wright	TKO (doctor stoppage)	UFC on ESPN: Munhoz vs. Edgar	August 22, 2020	1	1:31	Las Vegas, Nevada, United States	
Loss	17–10	Chase Sherman	TKO (punches and elbow)	UFC Fight Night: Smith vs. Teixeira	May 13, 2020	2	0:49	Jacksonville, Florida, United States	Heavyweight bout.
Win	17–9	Rashad Coulter	TKO (punches)	Fury FC 40	December 13, 2019	1	3:17	Humble, Texas, United States	Defended the Fury FC Light Heavyweight Championship.
Win	16–9	Roger Narvaez	TKO (punches)	Fury FC 36	August 30, 2019	1	0:28	Robstown, Texas, United States	Return to Light Heavyweight. Won the Fury FC Light Heavyweight Championship.
Win	15–9	Juan Torres	TKO (punches)	Fury FC 33	June 29, 2019	1	2:59	Houston, Texas, United States	Heavyweight bout.
Win	14–9	Patrick Miller	TKO (punches)	Fury FC 16	April 28, 2017	1	2:05	Humble, Texas, United States	
Loss	13–9	Antonio Jones	Decision (split)	Fury FC 15	February 17, 2017	3	3:00	Humble, Texas, United States	
Win	13–8	Matt Jones	Decision (unanimous)	TKO Fight Alliance	January 13, 2017	3	5:00	Houston, Texas, United States	Light Heavyweight bout.
Loss	12–8	Trevin Giles	Submission (arm-triangle choke)	Legacy FC 59	September 16, 2016	3	1:45	Houston, Texas, United States	
Win	12–7	Brandon Farran	Decision (unanimous)	Legacy FC 55	May 13, 2016	3	5:00	Houston, Texas, United States	
Win	11–7	Richard Knepp	TKO (punches)	Bellator 149	February 19, 2016	1	0:42	Houston, Texas, United States	Return to Middleweight.
Win	10–7	Husam Mohamed	TKO (punch)	Fury Fighting 9	January 15, 2016	1	1:08	Humble, Texas, United States	Catchweight (195 lb) bout.
Win	9–7	Kyle Keeney	TKO (punches)	Fury Fighting 8	October 9, 2015	1	0:24	Humble, Texas, United States	Heavyweight debut.
Loss	8–7	Robert Drysdale	Submission (armbar)	Legacy FC 12	July 13, 2012	1	1:27	Houston, Texas, United States	Catchweight (209.3 lb) bout; Villanueva missed weight.
Loss	8–6	Justin Ledet	Submission (armbar)	Immortal Kombat Fighting	January 28, 2012	3	0:40	Spring, Texas, United States	Light Heavyweight debut.
Loss	8–5	Larry Crowe	KO (head kick)	Legacy FC 8	August 18, 2012	2	1:57	Houston, Texas, United States	
Win	8–4	Alexander Pappas	TKO (punches)	International Xtreme Fight Association	September 16, 2011	1	1:32	Houston, Texas, United States	
Win	7–4	Brian Lightfoot	TKO (punches)	International Xtreme Fight Association	February 25, 2011	1	1:36	Houston, Texas, United States	
Win	6–4	Dwight Gipson	KO (punches)	TCF Puro Combate 2	December 4, 2010	1	0:58	Houston, Texas, United States	
Loss	5–4	Artenas Young	TKO (punches)	Legacy Promotions	July 31, 2010	3	1:43	Houston, Texas, United States	
Win	5–3	Chase Watson	Decision (unanimous)	Shark Fights 12	June 26, 2010	3	5:00	Amarillo, Texas, United States	
Win	4–3	Josh Luna	TKO (punches)	Shark Fights 10	April 24, 2010	1	0:28	Lubbock, Texas, United States	
Loss	3–3	Cody Donovan	Submission (rear-naked choke)	Ascend Combat: The Beginning	April 3, 2010	2	4:52	Shreveport, Louisiana, United States	
Loss	3–2	Marcus Sursa	Submission (guillotine choke)	Shark Fights 6	September 12, 2009	1	2:06	Amarillo, Texas, United States	
Win	3–1	Dale Mitchell	TKO (punches)	URC 5	July 18, 2009	1	1:23	Conroe, Texas, United States	
Win	2–1	Jason Basset	KO (punch)	SWC 6	May 23, 2009	1	0:20	Frisco, Texas, United States	
Win	1–1	Daniel Andrews	TKO (punches)	SWC 5	April 11, 2009	1	2:41	Frisco, Texas, United States	
Loss	0–1	JR Christy	TKO (punches)	Katana Cagefighting: Conquest	December 6, 2008	1	2:19	Robstown, Texas, United States	Middleweight debut.

== See also ==
- List of male mixed martial artists
