= Monarch High School (Colorado) =

American high school in Colorado

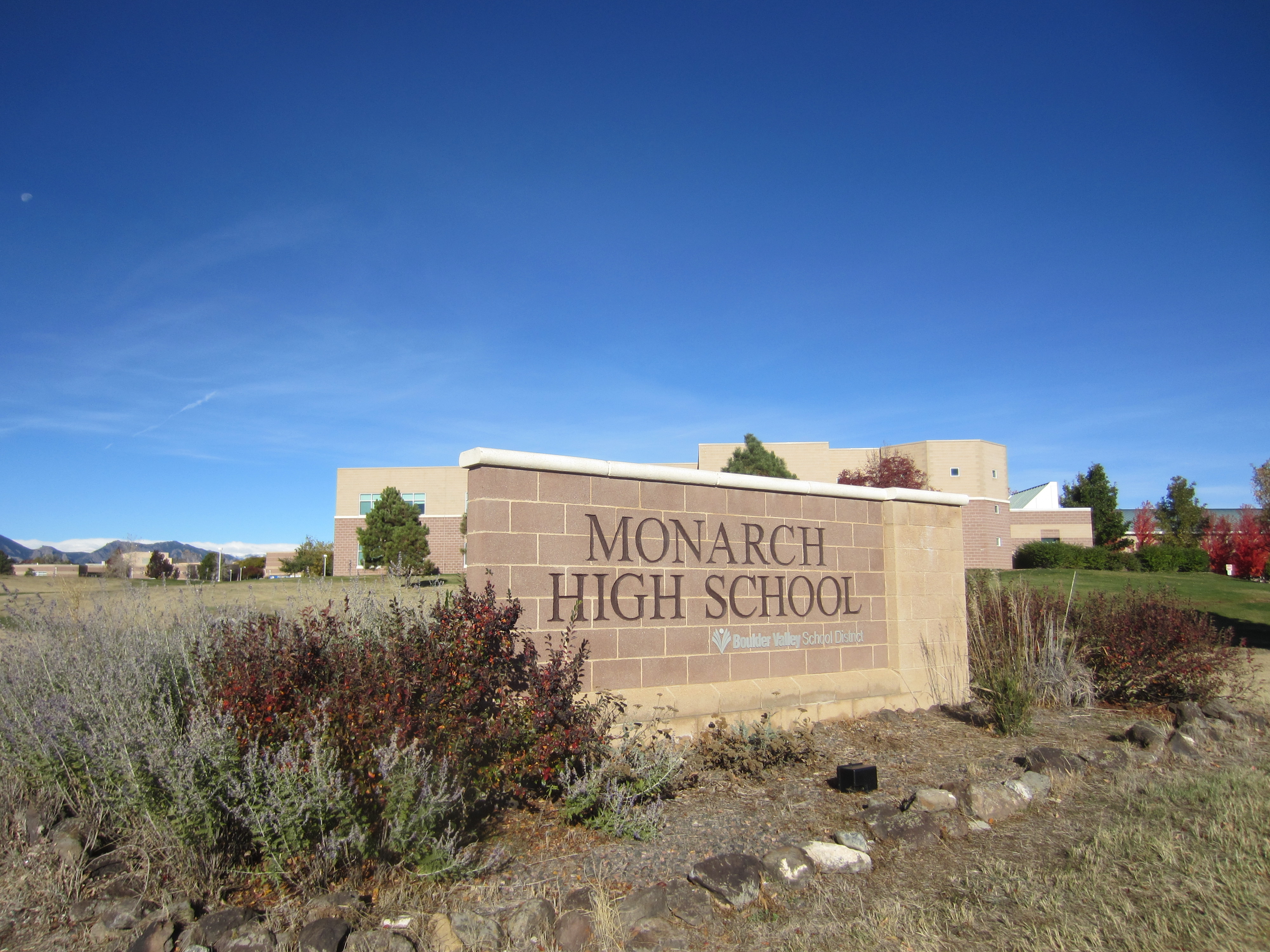

Location
- 329 Campus Drive; Louisville, Colorado 80027; United States; 39°57′07″N 105°08′30″W

Information
- Type: Public High School
- Motto: "Creating Bright Futures, One Student at a Time!"
- Established: 1998 (28 years ago)
- School district: Boulder Valley S.D.
- CEEB code: 060130
- Principal: Greg Doan
- Staff: 67.88 (FTE)
- Grades: 9–12
- Enrollment: 1,447 (2023-2024)
- Student to teacher ratio: 21.32
- Colors: Black, gold, and silver
- Athletics: 5A
- Athletics conference: Front Range League
- Mascot: Coyote
- Nickname: Mohi Coyotes
- Rival: Fairview High School
- Newspaper: The Howler, The Pack, The Mix
- Yearbook: Mosaic
- Feeder schools: Eldorado K-8, Monarch K-8, Louisville Middle School
- Elevation: 5,444 ft (1,660 m) AMSL
- Website: moh.bvsd.org

The Monarch High School (MHS) is a secondary school located in Louisville, Colorado, and is part of the Boulder Valley School District. The school was named a John Irwin School of Excellence for the 2004-2005 school year. In 2007, Monarch was named the Sixth Best High School in the Denver Metro Area by 5280 Magazine. As of 2015, Newsweek magazine ranked the high school 356th in the US, out of the top 500.

== History ==
The Monarch High School opened in 1998 to relieve overcrowding at Centaurus High School, drawing students from the east Boulder County towns of Louisville and Superior. Monarch's first graduating class graduated in 2001 and was also the class to decide on the coyotes as Monarch's mascot. Monarch High School is named after Monarch Mine #2 which is located under part of the campus. Monarch was originally a closed-campus, but as the population of the school grew, the school became an open campus for upperclassmen. Each high school in Boulder Valley School District has an emphasis; when opened, Monarch's emphasis was as the technology school and today has expanded to be a business/technology school.

== Campus ==
Monarch High School is located east of Boulder, in the town of Louisville. Louisville has been ranked as one of the best small citlies to live in the United States by Money magazine.

== Athletic achievements ==
Highlights: In 2011, Monarch won the Girls' 5A Cross Country championship. That same year Kirk Webb won the boy's individual Cross Country championship. The following year, 2012, the girls' cross country team successfully defended its state cross country championship. In 2002, Monarch won the Class 4A State Football Championship by defeating the Golden High School Demons, 42–35. Since 2001, Monarch has produced All-American, professional, and multiple NCAA division I, II, and III student athletes.

State Champions: Hip-Hop State Champions (2012, 2015, 2016) Boys Rugby (2017)
Girls' cross country (2011, 2012)
Football (2002)
Football (2012)
Ultimate Frisbee Open Championship (2014, spring season)
Ultimate Frisbee Mixed Championship (2015, fall season)
Ultimate Frisbee Open Championship (2018, spring season)
Ultimate Frisbee Girls Championship (2019, spring season)
Ultimate Frisbee Girls Championship (2020, spring season)

Runner-up teams:

Girls Basketball (2023) - 6A State Championship
Football (2007) - 4A State Championship
Women's Basketball (2012) 5A State Championship
Ultimate Frisbee Mixed Championship (2014, fall season)
Ultimate Frisbee Mixed Championship (2017, fall season)

Third-place teams:
In 2010, the Varsity Cheer team placed 3rd in the 5A Colorado State competition held by CHSAA. 2023 Boys D1A State Rugby Championship

== Club achievements ==
The school has had national award winners in forensics, art, robotics, mathematics, science and world language, and has a widely recognized Thespian Troupe. In 2004, the Colorado High School Press Association awarded Monarch High's 5A Yearbook First Place. Monarch has had national champion thespians and winners at ISEF (International Science and Engineering Fair). In February 2019 the Technology Student Association Chapter won 1st in state, qualifying for nationals, for software development.

== High School of Business ==
Monarch became a pilot school for the High School of Business in 2008, offering national certification for college-bound students interested in pursuing a business major. An advanced-level curriculum introduces key business concepts, encourages entrepreneurial skills, requires critical thinking, and provides experiences that facilitate the transition to top business colleges. Students build valuable skills through academic courses and participation in Monarch's DECA and FBLA chapters.

- Principles of Business and Economics, Principles of Marketing, Principles of Finance, Principles of Management, Business Strategies, and Internship with optional advanced coursework in Business Law, and Marketing.
- Hands-on Business and Marketing Internships where students work at least 30 hours in intensive on-the-job experiences.
- Nationally competitive Future Business Leaders of America (FBLA) chapter
- Internationally recognized DECA chapter (organization of marketing students)

== Athletic seasons offered ==
Monarch High School offers the following athletic programs:

Fall

- Cross country, football, gymnastics, soccer (boys'), tennis (boys'), golf (boys'), softball, volleyball (girls'), Ultimate Frisbee (mixed), mountain biking

Winter

- Basketball, swimming and diving (girls'), Skiing, Wrestling, Cheerleading, Poms, Ice Hockey

Spring

- Lacrosse (boys'), soccer (girls'), baseball, track & field, tennis (girls'), golf (girls'), swimming and diving (boys'), club volleyball (boys'), Ultimate Frisbee (boys'), Ultimate Frisbee (girls')

== ACLU case 2007–09 ==
In October 2007, the ACLU criticized the school's administration for actions in May 2007 when, allegedly, students' cell phones were seized and their messages read and transcribed. ACLU pointed to constitutional rights and to Colorado privacy laws that would make some of the alleged actions a felony. In April 2008, new guidelines to protect students' privacy were put in place, which were commended by the ACLU.

== Notable alumni ==
- Andrew Morris, MLB pitcher
- Kody Mommaerts, Ring Announcer
