= Robert Drysdale =

Brazilian jiu-jitsu (BJJ) and mixed martial arts (MMA) fighter

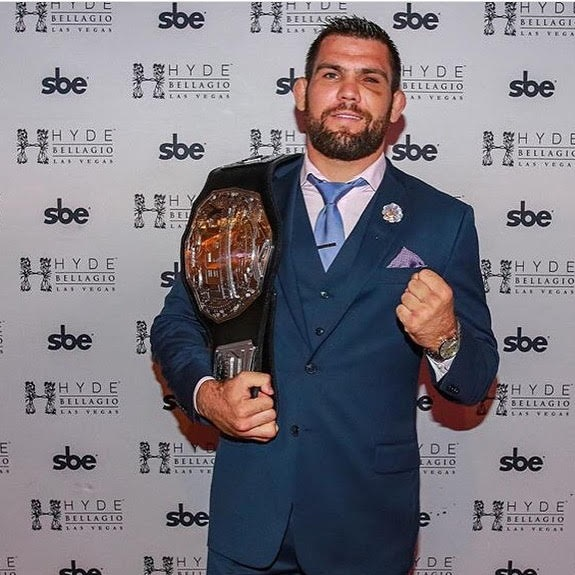
- Born: Robert Lewis Drysdale; October 5, 1981 (age 45); Provo, Utah, U.S.
- Nationality: American and Brazilian
- Height: 6 ft 3 in (1.91 m)
- Weight: 205 lb (93 kg; 14.6 st)
- Division: Light heavyweight
- Style: Brazilian jiu-jitsu
- Team: Zenith BJJ/Drysdale JJ
- Rank: Fourth degree black belt in Brazilian Jiu-Jitsu under Léo Vieira
- Years active: 2008–2019 (MMA)

Mixed martial arts record
- Total: 8
- Wins: 7
- By submission: 7
- Losses: 0
- No contests: 1

Other information
- Notable students: Forrest Griffin, Frank Mir, Randy Couture, Dan Hardy, Evan Dunham, Brad Tavares, Michelle Nicolini, Joanna Jędrzejczyk, Vitor Belfort, Wanderlei Silva, Kevin Randleman, Phil Baroni, Kevin Lee, Jakub Wikłacz, James McSweeney, Joe Stevenson, Jay Hieron
- Website: Drysdalejiujitsu.com DrysdaleBJJ.com
- Mixed martial arts record from Sherdog

Robert Drysdale
Medal record

Representing United States

Grappling

ADCC Submission Wrestling World Championship
Bronze medal – third place	2007 New Jersey, US	-99 kg
Gold medal – first place	2007 New Jersey, US	Absolute

Brazilian Jiu-Jitsu

World Jiu-Jitsu Championship
Gold medal – first place	2005 Rio de Janeiro, Brazil	-94 kg
Silver medal – second place	2006 Rio de Janeiro, Brazil	-94 kg
Silver medal – second place	2007 Los Angeles, US	-94 kg
Bronze medal – third place	2007 Los Angeles, US	Absolute

Robert Lewis Drysdale (born October 5, 1981) is a Brazilian-American Brazilian jiu-jitsu 4th degree black belt under Léo Vieira, a retired undefeated mixed martial artist and an instructor at his own BJJ academy. Having won multiple World Championships, he was referred to by Vice magazine as "America's jiu-jitsu superhero", regarded by BJJ Heroes as "the most accomplished American grappler of his generation" and as the best Submission Wrestler in the World by Gracie Magazine.

Drysdale is one of only two Americans (with Rafael Lovato Jr.) to have won Mundials in the gi at 94 kg and up. Drysdale is one of only four Americans to have won the ADCC absolute division; at the 2007 ADCC he submitted grappling legend Marcelo Garcia in just over two minutes.

== Early life ==
Born in Utah, the United States to a Brazilian mother and American father, he moved to Brazil with his family in 1987 at the age of six. Robert Drysdale spent much of his childhood in Brazil.

He was introduced to Brazilian jiu-jitsu during his late teens (17) at the Quatro Tempos Academy in the city of Itú, state of São Paulo, Brazil in 1998. Drysdale moved back to the US to pursue his academic studies in Las Vegas in 2008. He continued training with instructor Steve da Silva until with his instructor’s encouragement, Robert decided to move back to Brazil where the sport was gaining popularity and had more competition opportunities.

== Career ==
=== Brazilian jiu jitsu ===
Beginning in the early 1990s, jiu-jitsu began growing in popularity worldwide and Brazil was quickly becoming the Mecca for jiu-jitsu. Robert returned to Brazil in 2002 to dedicate himself entirely to training and competing in Brazilian jiu-jitsu. Over the years he has trained continually, initially with Maromba Club and eventually team Brasa Jiu-Jitsu Club in São Paulo, Brazil.

While training and competing for Brasa Club he received his Black Belt in 2004 from the famed Léo Vieira.

In Brazil, he went on to win multiple national and world titles, becoming the 2nd US national to win an IBJJF black belt World title (2005), after BJ Penn.

In 2007 he won the prestigious ADCC Submission Wrestling World Championship – Open Division ADCC, submitting Marcelo Garcia in just over two minutes, a feat considered to be the equivalent of "out-swimming" Michael Phelps.

In early 2008, he returned to the US where he trained with former UFC Champion, Randy Couture and former Pride Champion Wanderlei Silva. That same year he opened Drysdale Jiu-Jitsu in Las Vegas, still in operation today.

He has competed and taught in various countries around the world, including Germany, Denmark, Poland, France, Sweden, Finland, Mexico, Australia, New Zealand Canada, Cuba, Brazil, Norway, Ireland, Holland, Belgium, Greece, Serbia, Spain, Turkey, Russia, England, Scotland, Japan, Bulgaria and Austria; while teaching and hosting seminars in cities across the United States.

In 2012 Drysdale joined forces with Rodrigo Cavaca to form a new grappling team – Zenith BJJ, which became a big player in the sport.

=== Mixed martial arts ===
Robert Drysdale made his amateur MMA debut with Tuff-N-Uff in 2008, winning his fight. In 2010 Drysdale made a successful professional MMA debut defeating Bastien Huveneers via arm triangle choke. In his next fight, Drysdale faced Clay Davidson, a King of the Cage veteran who entered the contest riding a six-fight win streak. Drysdale won via armbar in the first round.

It was announced on February 16, 2012 that Drysdale has signed a multi-fight deal with Legacy Fighting Championship. Drysdale eventually made his debut at Legacy Fighting Championships 12 and went on to defeat Isaac Villanueva, Chris Reed and D.J. Linderman under the Legacy FC banner all by submission in the first round. Drysdale’s rampant MMA career brought him to the Ultimate Fighting Championship (UFC) in 2013.

Drysdale was expected to make his promotional debut against Ednaldo Oliveira on August 3, 2013 at UFC 163. However, Drysdale pulled out of the bout in mid-July citing a lingering staph infection.

Drysdale's debut was rescheduled for UFC 167, where he was slated to meet Cody Donovan. However, after failing an out-of-competition drug test, with a 19.4/1 T/E ratio, the Nevada State Athletic Commission ultimately declined to license him.

Drysdale eventually made his debut on July 6, 2014 against promotion newcomer Keith Berish at The Ultimate Fighter 19 finale. He won the fight via submission in the first round. However, the win was later overturned and changed to a no contest, after it was reveled that Drysdale had failed a post-fight drug test for an elevated testosterone-to-epitestosterone ratio. After failing his second drug test, Drysdale was released by the UFC.

After he served his suspension, Drysdale returned to pro MMA and became the Legacy Fighting Championship Light Heavyweight Champion by second-round rear-naked choke against future UFC fighter Ryan Spann at Legacy FC 58 in July 2016.

In late 2019, Drysdale revealed that he had retired from mixed martial arts.

=== MMA coach ===
Alongside his BJJ and MMA careers, Drysdale also cultivated a successful coach career, having trained many UFC and BJJ champions: Forrest Griffin, Frank Mir, Randy Couture, Dan Hardy, Evan Dunham, Brad Tavares, Michelle Nicolini, Joanna Jędrzejczyk, Vitor Belfort, Wanderlei Silva, Kevin Randleman, Phil Baroni, Kevin Lee, James McSweeney, Joe Stevenson, Jay Hieron

He was introduced on Countdown to UFC 101 as the BJJ coach of former UFC light heavyweight champion Forrest Griffin.

In 2008 Drysdale was brought in as an assistant coach to Frank Mir at The Ultimate Fighter Season 8. Again in 2013 as assistant coach to team Miesha Tate Season 18. was invited to be an assistant coach to Joe Benavidez on The Ultimate Fighter Season 24 and again as the grappling coach for Joanna Jędrzejczyk's team on The Ultimate Fighter season 23.

In June 2020, Drysdale elicited controversy after he refused to call off a fight involving his fighter Max Rohskopf vs. Austin Hubbard at UFC on ESPN: Blaydes vs. Volkov on June 20, despite Rohskopf telling him nine times between the second and third rounds to "call it." Eventually, a Nevada State Athletic Commission official intervened and called in the referee and doctor to check on Rohskopf, at which point the fight was stopped after Rohskopf expressed his unwillingness to continue.

NSAC executive director Bob Bennett indicated that Drysdale may face disciplinary action. "That's something we will take a look at," Bennett told ESPN. "We might want to take disciplinary action on them. That doesn't sound like they are looking out for a fighter. Obviously, he didn't want to come out."

Drysdale defended his actions, stating that "He wasn't seriously hurt." "I know he was not in harm's way. He was just frustrated. I was trying to give him a push so he overcame that frustration. I still believe he could have won the fight." After the fight, Rohskopf was cut from the UFC.

=== Sports commentator ===
On February 7, 2016, Drysdale made his debut as a sports commentator for WSOF-Global (WSOF Global Championship 2: Japan)

Drysdale has also worked for PFL/DAZN, FloSports and ACBJJ and FloGrappling.com in both English and Portuguese.

== Media ==
In March 2018, Drysdale announced that he was involved in a documentary production titled "Closed Guard: The Origins of Jiu-Jitsu in Brazil". The film is primarily about the history of Brazilian jiu-jitsu and Vale-Tudo (later rebranded "MMA") from Japanese immigrants to the Amazonian Jungle and from there to the world.

The film will explain how the art of Brazilian jiu-jitsu developed from the first Japanese immigrants onward. According to Drysdale, the goal of the film was to tell a complete account about how Brazilian jiu-jitsu drifted away from its Kodokan roots and became such a unique art. Additionally, the purpose of the film is to give credit to many forgotten names that made Brazilian jiu-jitsu possible, as well as acknowledge other already accredited names. The film, currently in production, has no release date yet.

In September 2020 Drysdale published the book "Opening Closed Guard: The Origins of Jiu-Jitsu in Brazil: The Story behind the Film", in which he describes the process that led up to and the production of the documentary, including full transcripts of the interviews conducted in the process of filming the documentary. The book includes interviews with many luminaries of Brazilian Jiu-Jitsu, including Carlos Gracie, Jr., João Alberto Barreto, Robson Gracie, Hélio Fadda, Armando Wriedt, Flávio Behring, Royce Gracie, the Valente Brothers, and others. The book was a #1 Amazon best-seller, and has been translated into Polish and Portuguese.

Alongside his experience as a producer, Drysdale also gave a TEDTalk at TedXTenayaPaseo, entitled "What is the point of winning?"

== Grappling credentials ==
=== 2007 (Black Belt) ===
- 1st place in the Abu-Dhabi Submission Wrestling World Championships – Open Division (ADCC)
- 3rd place in the Abu-Dhabi Submission Wrestling World Championships – -99 kg Division (ADCC)
- 2nd place in the BJJ World Championships (IBJJF/CBJJ)
- 3rd place in the BJJ World Championships – Open Division (IBJJF/CB)

=== 2005 (Black Belt) ===
- 3x times BJJ World Champion (IBJJF/CBJJ)
- 1st place Black Belt World Championships (CBJJO)

=== 2004 (Brown/Black Belt) ===
- 2x National Brazilian National Champion (IBJJF/CBJJ)
- 1st place in the Brazilian National Championship open division (IBJJF/CBJJ)
- 3rd place World Championship (IBJJf/CBJJ)
- 1st place in the Scandinavian open
- 1st place in the Scandinavian open absolute division

== Mixed martial arts record ==
Professional record breakdown
8 matches	7 wins	0 losses
By submission	7	0
No contests	1	

Res.	Record	Opponent	Method	Event	Date	Round	Time	Location	Notes
Win	7–0 (1)	Ryan Spann	Submission (rear-naked choke)	Legacy FC 58	July 22, 2016	2	2:58	Lake Charles, Louisiana, United States	Won the Legacy FC Light Heavyweight Championship.
NC	6–0 (1)	Keith Berish	NC (overturned by NSAC)	The Ultimate Fighter: Team Edgar vs. Team Penn Finale	July 6, 2014	1	2:03	Las Vegas, Nevada, United States	Submission (rear-naked choke) win overturned to NC; Drysdale tested positive for elevated testosterone.
Win	6–0	D.J. Linderman	Submission (rear-naked choke)	Legacy FC 19	April 12, 2013	1	1:48	Dallas, Texas, United States	
Win	5–0	Chris Reed	Submission (armbar)	Legacy FC 15	November 16, 2012	1	1:15	Houston, Texas, United States	
Win	4–0	Ike Villanueva	Submission (armbar)	Legacy FC 12	July 13, 2012	1	1:27	Houston, Texas, United States	
Win	3–0	Mike Nickels	Submission (guillotine choke)	AFC 6: Conviction	June 18, 2011	1	1:04	Victoria, British Columbia, Canada	
Win	2–0	Clay Davidson	Submission (armbar)	AFC 4: Revelation	November 6, 2010	1	2:54	Victoria, British Columbia, Canada	
Win	1–0	Bastien Huveneers	Submission (arm-triangle choke)	AFC 3: Evolution	July 17, 2010	1	1:12	Victoria, British Columbia, Canada	

== See also ==
- List of undefeated mixed martial artists
- List of Brazilian Jiu-Jitsu practitioners
- List of current UFC fighters
- List of male mixed martial artists
