= The Ultimate Fighter: Team Edgar vs. Team Penn =

UFC mixed martial arts television series and event in 2014

- Genre: Reality, Sports
- Created by: Frank Fertitta III, Lorenzo Fertitta, Dana White
- Starring: Dana White, Frankie Edgar, and B.J. Penn
- Country of origin: United States

Production
- Running time: 60 minutes

Original release
- Network: Fox Sports 1
- Release: April 16 – July 6, 2014

The Ultimate Fighter: Team Edgar vs. Team Penn (also known as The Ultimate Fighter 19) is the nineteenth U.S.-based installment of the Ultimate Fighting Championship (UFC)-produced reality television series The Ultimate Fighter.

The coaches and participating weight classes were officially announced by the UFC in September 2013. Featured on this season was a mix of middleweight and light heavyweight competitors.

== Cast ==
=== Coaches ===
Team Edgar

- Frankie Edgar, Head Coach
- Mark Henry, Boxing Coach
- Ricardo Almeida, Jiu Jitsu Coach
- Steve Rivera, Wrestling Coach
- Anderson França, Muay Thai Coach

Team Penn

- B.J. Penn, Head Coach
- Mark Coleman, Wrestling Coach
- Andre Pederneiras, Jiu Jitsu Coach
- Jason Parillo, Boxing Coach
- John Hackleman

=== Fighters ===
- Team Edgar
  - Middleweights: Hector Urbina, Ian Stephens, Eddie Gordon, and Dhiego Lima.
  - Light Heavyweights: Todd Monaghan, Patrick Walsh, Matt Van Buren, and Corey Anderson.
- Team Penn
  - Middleweights: Cathal Pendred, Roger Zapata, Tim Williams, and Mike King.
  - Light Heavyweights: Daniel Spohn, Chris Fields, Anton Berzin, and Josh Clark.
- Fighters eliminated before entry round
  - Middleweights: Adrian Miles, Tyler Minton, Lyman Good, Bojan Veličković, Matt Gabel, Adam Stroup, and Nordine Taleb.
  - Light Heavyweights: Tyler King, Jake Heun, Josh Stansbury, Cody Mumma, John Poppie, Doug Sparks, Daniel Vizcaya, and Kelly Anundson.

== Episodes ==
Episode 1: "The Hurting Game" (April 16, 2014)

- Edgar and Penn meet and appreciate the opportunity to coach this season and fight for the third time. They both share their respect for each other and admit that there's no bad blood between the two other than their competitive spirit.
- The preliminary fights began:

Daniel Spohn defeated Tyler King via knockout (punch) in the first round.
Hector Urbina defeated Adrian Miles via submission (guillotine choke) in the first round.
Todd Monaghan defeated Jake Heun via submission (armbar) in the first round.
Cathal Pendred gets a bypass because his opponent withdrew from the fight at the last minute due to not making weight.
Roger Zapata defeated Tyler Minton via TKO (punches) in the second round.
Ian Stephens defeated Lyman Good via unanimous decision after two rounds.
Chris Fields defeated Josh Stansbury via TKO (knee injury) in the first round.
Anton Berzin defeated Cody Mumma via submission (triangle armbar) in the first round.
Tim Williams defeated Bojan Velickovic via TKO (punches) in the third round.
Eddie Gordon defeated Matt Gabel via unanimous decision after two rounds.
Josh Clark defeated John Poppie via submission (triangle armbar) in the third round.
Patrick Walsh defeated Doug Sparks via submission (kimura) in the first round.
Matt Van Buren defeated Daniel Vizcaya via TKO (elbows) in the first round.
Corey Anderson defeated Kelly Anundson via unanimous decision after two rounds.
Dhiego Lima defeated Adam Stroup via unanimous decision after two rounds.
Mike King defeated Nordine Taleb via decision after three rounds.

- Dana White reminds the fighters that they could receive $25,000 for Knockout of the Season, Submission of the Season and Fight of the Season. He also tells them that the winning fighter and coach will get a Harley Davidson motorcycle as well.
- White flips a coin (red for Edgar, blue for Penn) to decide who will choose the first fighter or first fight. Edgar wins the coin toss and opts to choose the first fighter.
- Light Heavyweights selection:

| Coach | 1st Pick | 2nd Pick | 3rd Pick | 4th Pick |
|---|---|---|---|---|
| Edgar | Corey Anderson | Patrick Walsh | Matt Van Buren | Todd Monaghan |
| Penn | Anton Berzin | Josh Clark | Daniel Spohn | Chris Fields |

- Middleweights selection:

| Coach | 1st Pick | 2nd Pick | 3rd Pick | 4th Pick |
|---|---|---|---|---|
| Edgar | Ian Stephens | Dhiego Lima | Eddie Gordon | Hector Urbina |
| Penn | Mike King | Tim Williams | Cathal Pendred | Roger Zapata |

- Penn announces the first fight and matches Pendred against Urbina.

Episode 2: "Flying the Flag" (April 23, 2014)

- The 16 fighters move into the TUF house and pick their team bedrooms and then train with their coaches the next day.
- The hype is very high on Pendred as he is the former Cage Warriors welterweight champion and he is the only fighter who made it into the house without actually fighting. Even Dana White says people are blowing him up on Twitter about him.
- Things get intense between Pendred and Urbina when they wear their countries' flags (Ireland and Mexico) and literally go nose-to-nose during the stare-down at the weigh-in.
- Cathal Pendred defeated Hector Urbina via unanimous decision after three rounds.
- After the fight, Pendred is proud to show America the "fighting Irish spirit" while Edgar shows his frustration toward Urbina telling him, "Sometimes you're just eating knees anyway, you just have to get the fuck up."
- Penn announces the first light heavyweight fight: Daniel Spohn vs. Todd Monaghan.

Episode 3: "Anytime, Anywhere" (April 30, 2014)

- Frankie Edgar brings in Brazilian jiu jitsu black belt and MMA legend Renzo Gracie to help his team.
- Cathal Pendred asked for the wrestling mats to be brought into the TUF house for extra training in Team Penn's room. Daniel Spohn makes use of these mats to get ready for his fight and gives his teammates a demonstration in Kachido Aikijitsu and Gung fu called "Iron Body."
- Todd Monaghan, who is a preacher back home holds a sermon for the fighters, making Pendred question Monaghan's religious lifestyle of being a "man of God" because of all the gold jewelry he wears. Pendred and his teammates believe that he is really preaching for the cameras.
- Corey Anderson is worried about Monaghan's "cocky and bigheadedness" leading up to the fight and tells him to be prepared to have a gameplan if he loses, much to Monaghan's dislike.
- Daniel Spohn defeated Todd Monaghan via unanimous decision after two rounds.
- White called it "a fight that made no-sense" when Spohn decided to just wrestle Monaghan to the mat the entire fight and "sit on him for 10 minutes" while Monaghan, who had Edgar and Gracie as the "best cornermen in the business," on his side did not listen to anything they were saying to get out of a tough situation.
- Penn announces the second middleweight fight: Tim Williams vs. Dhiego Lima.

Episode 4: "Stand and Bang" (May 7, 2014)

- After losing their first two fights, Team Edgar starts to get frustrated with each other, especially Todd Monaghan who has words with Patrick Walsh about being a "mediator" (playing both sides) and not on his team's side.
- Walsh's re-injures his herniated disk in his back when it flared up while sparring in practice and is afraid that he will not be ready to fight when called upon. Meanwhile, Team Penn are pushed to their limits during their training session.
- After losing to Dylan Andrews in TUF 17 and not wanting a repeat with a defeat, Tim Williams put in extra training every chance he gets while not at the gym. He also tells the guys he had an aneurysm before his first fight with Chris Weidman, who is now the UFC middleweight champion.
- Matt Van Buren (nicknamed "Gutter") "gutter talks" his way into being disliked by the other fighters at the TUF house and challenges Chris Fields to a fight just because Fields commented about his "country" accent, right after Van Buren joked about his Irish accent.
- At the weigh-in, Dhiego Lima gets annoyed at Team Penn's fight chant ("O-Lay") during the stare down.
- Dhiego Lima defeated Tim Williams via submission (rear-naked choke) in round 2.
- This was in a come-from-behind victory. After the fight, Penn fears that he has overtrained Williams because, despite his good cardio, Williams had no energy in the cage.
- Now in control, Edgar picks the second light heavyweight fight: Corey Anderson vs. Josh Clark.

Episode 5: "Too Salty" (May 14, 2014)

- Penn give his team a lecture about overtraining and tells them while back at the house they must rest their bodies.
- The blue team takes a break from training to celebrate Halloween by carving Jack-o'-lanterns and giving out candy to trick-or-treaters (including Edgar and his two sons who came dressed as Teenage Mutant Ninja Turtles). A couple of fighters even dressed up in women's clothing for their costumes.
- Meanwhile, Edgar takes his team hiking on the trails of Mount Charleston, much to a few of his fighters' dislike, since it was a long and tiring time.
- Roger Zapata rubs some of the wrestling-based fighters on Team Edgar the wrong way when he comments, "Wrestling is simple in terms of moves: single or double leg takedown." This especially prompted Division I wrestler Corey Anderson to lose his temper.
- Corey Anderson defeated Josh Clark via majority decision after two rounds.
- Still in control of the match-ups, Edgar picks the third middleweight fight and matches Ian Stephens against Zapata.

Episode 6: "Fight to Live" (May 21, 2014)

- Penn invited his friend and former rival, UFC Hall of Famer Matt Hughes, as a guest coach to help his team with wrestling techniques during practice.
- For the first time ever, White is so outraged at referee Steve Mazzagatti's decision to take a point away for Zapata's supposed illegal downward elbow without a warning, that he leaves cage-side and goes back to his office in disgust. Although Mazzagatti did warn Zapata several times, White believes that he should have given Zapata a clear final warning before reducing a point.
- After the winner is announced, both teams are confused and shocked on how the judges first scored the fight as a majority draw (10–8, 9–9, 9–9) and then changed their decision to giving Zapata the win.
- White commented that he thought Zapata won the fight because he did more damage from his "freestyle striking" as opposed to Stephens just being what he described as a "human blanket" by just lying on top without any submission attempts.
- After the fight, Penn said: "I'm not gonna lie, I thought Stephens was gonna get the nod." Stephens' teammates all thought that he dominated the first two rounds, stating that the fight never should have gone to the third round.
- Roger Zapata defeated Ian Stephens via "judges' decision" after three rounds.
- This was considered the most controversial fight in TUF history.
- Back in control of the match-ups, Penn picks the third light heavyweight fight: Anton Berzin vs. Patrick Walsh.

Episode 7: "Kinetic Chess" (May 28, 2014)

- In the aftermath of Roger Zapata's controversial win over Ian Stephens, both teams' tensions are on the rise in the TUF house, especially Edgar and his team who still believes Stephens had won the fight, despite the judges scoring and White's pick for Zapata.
- Penn's assistant coach Mark Coleman visits the fighters to watch a UFC event in Brazil and witnesses the teams' tensions boil over when Matt Van Buren makes a comment about one of the fights on TV having similar scoring to the Zapata/Stephens fight, causing Team Penn to come to Zapata's defense.
- This altercation puts Eddie Gordon on edge and he goes to verbal blows, first with Chris Fields, and then Daniel Spohn who was trying to calm the situation down.
- Patrick Walsh defeated Anton Berzin via unanimous decision after three rounds.
- Again, another Team Penn fighter "gassed out" due to lack of cardio.
- Edgar, back in control, picks the fourth middleweight fight and matches Gordon against Mike King.

Episode 8: "Someone's Getting Bullied" (June 4, 2014)

- Disgusted with Team Edgar's lack of cleanliness, Mike King leaves a sign with profanity to clean their dishes. This note rubs Eddie Gordon the wrong way before their fight, saying "somebody's getting bullied" in the cage, "and it's not going to be [him]."
- During training, Penn and his assistant coaches are worried that King will forget about their game plan by wanting to "stand and bang" against Gordon and knock him out rather than to use his strength in wrestling.
- This season's "Coaches Challenge" put Frankie Edgar and B.J. Penn against each other in a kayak race at a nearby lake. They had to paddle around buoys and race under a bridge to the finish line. Penn won the competition earning $10,000 for his team ($1,500 per fighter), joking that it is how his ancestors got to Hawaii.
- Eddie Gordon defeated Mike King via unanimous decision after three rounds.
- King was badly poked in the eye in the second round, ruining his depth perception. Again, White describes this as another "terrible fight" because there was "no sense of urgency" from both fighters to win the fight in the sudden victory round.
- The last preliminary match-up is picked fourth, a light heavyweight fight between: Team Penn's Chris Fields vs. Team Edgar's Matt Van Buren.

Episode 9: "Get That Money" (June 11, 2014)

- The semifinalist fighters along with their coaches take a trip to the local Harley Davidson dealership and are greeted by TUF season 15 winner Michael Chiesa who helps them customize their potential motorcycles and gear for winning The Ultimate Fighter.
- Matt Van Buren defeated Chris Fields via unanimous decision after two rounds.
- Yet again, White is disappointed in another simply because he says, "nothing interesting or exciting happened" during this fight. White also says, "I feel like this is the season where guys just don't want it!"
- White calls both coaches in to pick their match-ups for the semifinals. However, White is so displeased on the fighters' lack of heart that he takes it upon himself to ask the fighters not his usual, "Who do you want to fight?" but for this season he asks the fighters, "Do you want to be here?"
- To try and motivate the fighters, White tells them instead of going for a boring decision win, go and get that money and either get a knockout of the night, a submission of the night or a fight of the night for a chance to earn a total of $50,000.
- The semifinal match-ups are hand-picked by Dana White according to what fights he would like to watch:

Middleweight fights: Eddie Gordon vs. Cathal Pendred, and Dhiego Lima vs. Roger Zapata.
Light heavyweight fights: Corey Anderson vs. Patrick Walsh, and Matt Van Muren vs. Daniel Spohn.

Episode 10: "One Fight Away" (June 18, 2014)

- After White expressing his concerns about the fighter's hearts and having boring fights, Matt Van Buren pleads his case to Chris Fields, the fighter he defeated in an underwhelming fight and says he didn't want to "slug it out" with Fields because what happens if he gets cut or beat up, he still has to fight.
- Out of the competition, Fields, Hector Urbina, Tim Williams decides to have a "legendary night of drinking" at the TUF house. Their drunken binge caused Fields and Urbina to have some heated words with each other about Urbina's fight with Pendred and a couple of embarrassing naked moments for Williams.
- Since Corey Anderson and Patrick Walsh are fighting each other, Edgar decides not to coach either one of them, so he tells them to pick a teammate to train with and to the fighters' surprise, Anderson and Walsh are sparring together.
- White invited the semifinalists to the MGM Grand arena where UFC 167 is about to take place, to try to get the fighters fired up while stepping in the cage, so he can show them they are only one fight away from fighting at Mandalay Bay in the final and remind them why they are really here.
- Eddie Gordon defeated Cathal Pendred via split decision after three rounds in a close fight.
- Next up is the light heavyweight match-up between Team Edgar's fighters with Anderson matched against Walsh.

Episode 11: "The Zombie" (June 25, 2014)

- When Walsh asks his coach if he can practice with a couple of Team Penn's fighters so he could get more training in per day, Edgar gives his approval.
- After finding out that Walsh actually trained with Penn and his assistant coaches, his opponent Anderson expresses his opinions in fear he is giving away his secrets to the blue team.
- Before the red team's training, Edgar confronts Walsh in front of the team and assistant coaches in the locker room to discuss his actions about training with Team Penn, causing Walsh to get emotional because the whole situation was poorly handled by Edgar and it is unwanted stress before his fight.
- Corey Anderson defeated Patrick Walsh via unanimous decision after three rounds.
- This was in what some of the fighters call the most exciting fight of the season. Also, White nicknames Walsh a zombie for the way he just kept coming forward with his hands down when hit.
- Next up are the last two fights of the season: middleweight match-up between Dhiego Lima vs. Roger Zapata, and light heavyweight match-up between: Matt Van Buren vs. Daniel Spohn.

Episode 12: "The Big Show" (July 2, 2014)

- B.J. Penn invites UFC Hall of Famer Chuck Liddell to help his team with their ground and pound.
- Dhiego Lima defeated Roger Zapata via submission (armbar) in round 1.
- Matt Van Buren defeated Daniel Spohn via TKO (punches) in round 2.
- With the final four fighters on Team Edgar, White noted, that was a long time when one coach completely wiped out the other coach.
- The fighters making it to the season finale, fighting live at the Mandalay Bay Events Center in Las Vegas are:

Middleweight fights: Eddie Gordon vs. Dhiego Lima.
Light heavyweight fights: Corey Anderson vs. Matt Van Buren.

- Also, live in the finale, the coaches will fight: Frankie Edgar vs. B.J. Penn.

== Tournament Bracket ==
=== Middleweight Bracket ===
Elimination Round
6 Cathal Pendred | UD
7 Hector Urbina | 3
2 Mike King | 3
5 Eddie Gordon | UD
4 Tim Williams | 2
3 Dhiego Lima | SUB
8 Roger Zapata | D*
1 Ian Stephens | 3

Semi-finals
6 Cathal Pendred | 3
5 Eddie Gordon | SD
3 Dhiego Lima | SUB
8 Roger Zapata | 1

Finale
5 Eddie Gordon | KO
3 Dhiego Lima | 1

*The original result of the Zapata-Stephens fight was a majority draw (28–28, 28–28, 27–29 Stephens), but the Nevada State Athletic Commission decided to pick Zapata as the winner.

=== Light Heavyweight Bracket ===
Elimination Round
4 Josh Clark | 2
1 Corey Anderson | MD
2 Anton Berzin | 3
3 Patrick Walsh | UD
8 Chris Fields | 2
5 Matt Van Buren | MD
6 Daniel Spohn | UD
7 Todd Monaghan | 2

Semi-finals
1 Corey Anderson | UD
3 Patrick Walsh | 3
5 Matt Van Buren | TKO
6 Daniel Spohn | 2

Finale
1 Corey Anderson | TKO
5 Matt Van Buren | 1

Legend
| | Team Edgar |
| | Team Penn |
| UD | Unanimous Decision |
| MD | Majority Decision |
| SD | Split Decision |
| SUB | Submission |
| (T)KO | (Technical) Knock Out |
| D | Draw |

=== Bonus awards ===
Fans voted to award the following $25,000 bonus awards to fights that took place during the TUF 19 season:

- Fight of the Season: Matt Van Buren vs. Daniel Spohn
- Performance of the Season: Dhiego Lima (Lima was awarded both Performance bonuses.)

== The Ultimate Fighter 19 Finale ==
The Ultimate Fighter: Team Edgar vs. Team Penn Finale
- The poster for The Ultimate Fighter: Team Edgar vs. Team Penn Finale
- Promotion: Ultimate Fighting Championship
- Date: July 6, 2014
- Venue: Mandalay Bay Events Center
- City: Las Vegas, Nevada
- Attendance: 6,500
- Total gate: $835,000

Event chronology
| UFC 175: Weidman vs. Machida | The Ultimate Fighter: Team Edgar vs. Team Penn Finale | UFC Fight Night: Cowboy vs. Miller |

The Ultimate Fighter: Team Edgar vs. Team Penn Finale (also known as The Ultimate Fighter 19 Finale) was a mixed martial arts event held by the Ultimate Fighting Championship. It took place on July 6, 2014, at the Mandalay Bay Events Center in Las Vegas, Nevada.

=== Background ===
The event was headlined by a third bout between former UFC Lightweight Champions Frankie Edgar and B.J. Penn. The two previously met at UFC 112 and again at UFC 118 with Edgar winning both fights via unanimous decision.

Also featured on the card were the finals from The Ultimate Fighter: Team Edgar vs. Team Penn in middleweight and light heavyweight divisions.

Alexis Dufresne weighed in too heavy for her bout against Sarah Moras.

=== Results ===
Main Card (Fox Sports 1)
| Weight class | | | | Method | Round | Time | Notes |
|---|---|---|---|---|---|---|---|
| Featherweight | Frankie Edgar | def. | B.J. Penn | TKO (punches) | 3 | 4:16 |
| Light Heavyweight | Corey Anderson | def. | Matt Van Buren | TKO (punches) | 1 | 1:01 | (Note: The Ultimate Fighter 19 Light Heavyweight Final) |
| Middleweight | Eddie Gordon | def. | Dhiego Lima | TKO (punches) | 1 | 1:11 | (Note: The Ultimate Fighter 19 Middleweight Final) |
| Heavyweight | Derrick Lewis | def. | Guto Inocente | TKO (punches) | 1 | 3:30 |
| Flyweight | Dustin Ortiz | def. | Justin Scoggins | Decision (split) (29-28, 28–29, 29–28) | 3 | 5:00 |
Preliminary card (Fox Sports 1)
| Lightweight | Kevin Lee | def. | Jesse Ronson | Decision (split) (29-28, 28–29, 30–27) | 3 | 5:00 |
| Bantamweight | Leandro Issa | def. | Zhumabek Tursyn | Submission (armbar) | 3 | 3:49 | (Note: Issa was docked a point in round 2 for grabbing the cage.) |
| Lightweight | Adriano Martins | def. | Juan Puig | KO (punch) | 1 | 2:21 | (Note: This bout aired on the broadcast following the Gordon vs Lima bout.) |
| Light Heavyweight | Patrick Walsh | def. | Daniel Spohn | Decision (unanimous) (29-28, 29–28, 29–28) | 3 | 5:00 |
Preliminary card (UFC Fight Pass)
| Catchweight (143 lb) | Sarah Moras | def. | Alexis Dufresne | Decision (unanimous) (29-28, 29–28, 30–27) | 3 | 5:00 |
| Light Heavyweight | Robert Drysdale | vs. | Keith Berish | No Contest (overturned) | 1 | 2:03 | (Note: Originally a Submission (rear-naked choke) victory for Drysdale, the result was changed to "No Contest" after Drysdale tested positive for elevated testosterone-to-epitestosterone levels during a post fight screening.) |

=== Bonus awards ===
The following fighters received $50,000 bonuses:

- Fight of the Night: Leandro Issa vs. Jumabieke Tuerxun
- Performance of the Night: Leandro Issa and Adriano Martins

=== Reported payout ===
The following is the reported payout to the fighters as reported to the Nevada State Athletic Commission. It does not include sponsor money and also does not include the UFC's traditional "fight night" bonuses.

- Frankie Edgar: $260,000 (includes $130,000 win bonus) def. B.J. Penn: $150,000
- Corey Anderson: $16,000 (includes $8,000 win bonus) def. Matt Van Buren: $8,000
- Eddie Gordon: $16,000 (includes $8,000 win bonus) def. Dhiego Lima: $8,000
- Derrick Lewis: $20,000 (includes $10,000 win bonus) def. Guto Inocente: $10,000
- Dustin Ortiz: $28,000 (includes $14,000 win bonus) def. Justin Scoggins: $12,000
- Kevin Lee: $16,000 (includes $8,000 win bonus) def. Jesse Ronson: $8,000
- Leandro Issa: $15,000 (includes $7,500 win bonus) def. Jumabieke Tuerxun: $8,000
- Adriano Martins: $30,000 (includes $15,000 win bonus) def. Juan Manuel Puig: $8,000
- Patrick Walsh: $16,000 (includes $8,000 win bonus) def. Dan Spohn: $8,000
- Sarah Moras: $18,000 (includes $8,000 win bonus) def. Alexis Dufresne: $6,000 ^
- Robert Drysdale: $16,000 (includes $8,000 win bonus) def. Keith Berish: $8,000

^ Although not recognized on the official pay sheet, Dufresne was fined $2,000, or 25% of her base pay for missing weight for the fight, and contracts were reworked with those amounts. That money was issued to Moras, an NSAC official confirmed.

== See also ==
- The Ultimate Fighter
- List of current UFC fighters
- List of UFC events
- 2014 in UFC
