= Corey Anderson (fighter) =

American mixed martial arts (MMA) fighter

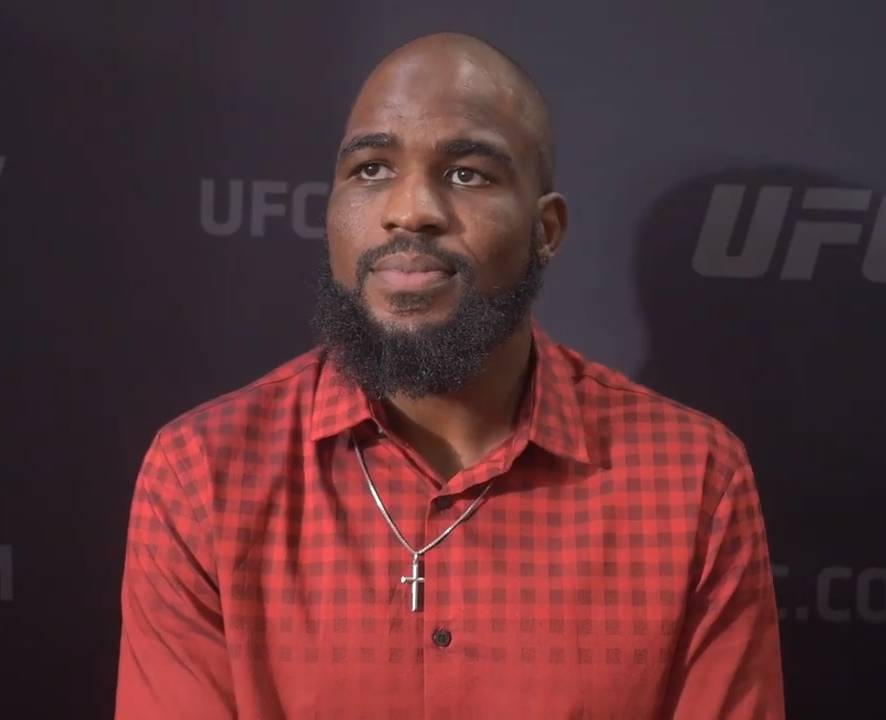
- Corey Anderson ahead of UFC 244 in Madison Square Garden
- Born: September 22, 1989 (age 37); Rockford, Illinois, U.S.
- Other names: Overtime
- Height: 6 ft 3 in (191 cm)
- Weight: 205 lb (93 kg; 14.6 st)
- Division: Light heavyweight (2013, 2014–present); Heavyweight (2013), (2025)
- Reach: 79 in (201 cm)
- Style: Wrestling, BJJ
- Fighting out of: Rockton, Illinois, U.S.
- Team: Renzo Gracie Academy
- Rank: Black belt in Brazilian Jiu-Jitsu under Ricardo Almeida
- Wrestling: NCAA Division II Wrestling
- Years active: 2013–present

Mixed martial arts record
- Total: 27
- Wins: 20
- By knockout: 9
- By decision: 11
- Losses: 6
- By knockout: 4
- By decision: 2
- No contests: 1

Other information
- Mixed martial arts record from Sherdog

Corey Anderson (born September 22, 1989) is an American mixed martial artist currently signed to the PFL, where he is the current and inaugural Light Heavyweight World Champion. He formerly competed in Bellator MMA, where he was the last Light Heavyweight World Champion, and the UFC, where he competed in the light heavyweight division, and was the light heavyweight winner on The Ultimate Fighter: Team Edgar vs. Team Penn and achieved success as a top 5 UFC light heavyweight contender. As of March 26, 2026, he is #2 in the PFL men's pound-for-pound rankings.

== Early life ==
=== Wrestling career ===
Anderson was born and raised in Rockton, Illinois, where he started wrestling in the third grade and later on attended Hononegah Community High School. As a high school wrestler, he earned a third-place finish at the Freestyle State Championships (Illinois High School Association and was also a regional champion. Upon graduation, he went on to attend Lincoln College in Illinois, where he got an associate degree. During his first year there, he was forced to take a redshirt due to an injury in his leg. After healing, he placed as high as sixth at the National Championships (claiming All-American status) and took first at the Regional Championships as a freshman and sophomore, in the NJCAA level. After graduating junior college, Anderson transferred to Newberry College to compete in the NCAA Division II level, where he compiled a record of 14 wins and 6 defeats as a junior. He then transferred to the University of Wisconsin–Whitewater. As a senior, Anderson compiled 46 victories and just 5 losses and went on to place second at the 2012 NCAA Division III Championships (the highest in the school's history), before graduating with a degree in business administration.

=== MMA starts ===
During his time wrestling at UW-Whitewater, Anderson met at the time's recently crowned Bellator MMA Welterweight Champion and former freestyle wrestling Olympian Ben Askren, who due to Anderson's boxing like mobility when he wrestled, encouraged him to give mixed martial arts a try. After initial refusal, Askren brought Anderson to Roufus MMA by making him think he was going to prepare him for freestyle when it was actually mixed martial arts practice. Corey was then brought to Fiore MMA in Springfield, IL by Marc Fiore, coach of 9-time UFC Champion Matt Hughes. Here Corey trained with other professional fighters such as Dustin Jacoby, Benny Alloway, James Brum, Jake Hect, Matt Veach, and Brian Foster. Following the closing of Fiore MMA, Corey and other fighters opened up The Kennel Fight Club in Springfield, IL. It was here that his coach, MMA competitor Bobby Brents, pushed Corey to try out for the Ultimate Fighter.

== Mixed martial arts career ==
=== The Ultimate Fighter ===
Anderson was revealed as one of the cast members of the nineteenth season of The Ultimate Fighter, coached by Frankie Edgar and B.J. Penn, on March 25, 2014. In the elimination rounds to determine who got into the TUF house, Anderson fought and defeated Kelly Anundson by unanimous decision after two rounds. He was then chosen as the first pick for Team Edgar's light heavyweights.

In the quarter-finals, Anderson fought Team Penn's, Josh Clark. Anderson utilized his wrestling to control the majority of the bout, resulting in a majority decision win. Anderson next fought fellow Team Edgar teammate, Patrick Walsh, in the semi-finals. He defeated Walsh by unanimous decision to secure his spot at the finale.

=== Ultimate Fighting Championship ===
Anderson faced Matt Van Buren in the light heavyweight finals on July 6, 2014, at The Ultimate Fighter 19 Finale. He quickly won the bout via TKO just 61 seconds into the first round to become the light heavyweight tournament winner. His 61-second first-round TKO marked the fastest finish ever to the finale of The Ultimate Fighter show.

Anderson was expected to face Gian Villante on December 6, 2014, at UFC 181. However, Villante pulled out of the fight citing an injury and was replaced by Jonathan Wilson. A few days later, it was announced that Wilson was forced out of the fight and undefeated newcomer Justin Jones would take his place. He won the fight via unanimous decision.

A rescheduled bout with Villante took place on April 18, 2015, at UFC on Fox 15. Anderson lost the fight via TKO in the third round. Despite the loss, he was awarded a bonus for Fight of the Night.

Anderson faced Jan Błachowicz on September 5, 2015, at UFC 191. He won the fight by unanimous decision.

Anderson stepped up to face Fábio Maldonado on November 7, 2015, at UFC Fight Night 77, filling in for an injured Tom Lawlor. He won the one sided fight by unanimous decision.

Anderson faced Tom Lawlor on March 5, 2016, at UFC 196. He won the fight by unanimous decision.

Anderson faced Maurício Rua on May 14, 2016, at UFC 198. Rua was awarded a split decision victory.

Anderson faced Sean O'Connell on December 9, 2016, at UFC Fight Night 102. He won the fight by TKO in the second round.

Anderson faced Jimi Manuwa on March 18, 2017, in the main event at UFC Fight Night 107. He lost the fight via knockout in the first round.

Anderson was expected to face Patrick Cummins on November 4, 2017, at UFC 217. However, on October 17, Cummins pulled out due to a resistant staph infection. He was replaced by Ovince Saint Preux. After losing the first round and winning the second due to his wrestling, Anderson lost the fight via head kick knockout early in the third round.

Anderson faced Patrick Cummins on April 21, 2018 UFC Fight Night 128. He won the fight via unanimous decision.

Anderson faced Glover Teixeira on July 22, 2018, at UFC Fight Night 134, replacing injured Ilir Latifi He won the fight via unanimous decision.

Anderson faced Ilir Latifi on December 29, 2018, at UFC 232. He won the fight via unanimous decision.

Anderson faced Johnny Walker on November 2, 2019, at UFC 244. He won the fight by technical knockout in the first round. This win earned him the Performance of the Night award. During the post fight celebration, Anderson taunted and screamed at Walker and shoved the referee away resulting in a fine of $10,000 from New York State Athletic Commission for "unsportsmanlike and disorderly conduct".

Anderson faced Jan Błachowicz on February 15, 2020, at UFC Fight Night 167 in a rematch. He lost the fight via first round knockout.

=== Bellator MMA ===
On August 7, 2020, it was announced that Anderson had signed a multi-fight deal with Bellator MMA after being granted his release from his UFC contract. He made his promotional debut against Melvin Manhoef at Bellator 251 on November 5, 2020. He was victorious via second round technical knockout.

On February 9, 2021, it was announced that Anderson would be competing in the Bellator Light Heavyweight World Grand Prix. He was scheduled to face promotional newcomer and former Absolute Championship Akhmat Light Heavyweight champion Dovletdzhan Yagshimuradovv in the quarterfinal round on April 9 at Bellator 256. On March 26, it was announced that the bout would be moved to Bellator 257 on April 16. Anderson won the bout via third-round technical knockout.

In the semi-finals of the Grand Prix, Anderson faced Ryan Bader on October 16, 2021, at Bellator 268. He won the fight via TKO early in round one.

In the finals of the Bellator Light Heavyweight World Grand Prix Tournament, Anderson took on reigning champion Vadim Nemkov for the 205-pound title as well as the $1 million prize on April 15, 2022, at Bellator 277. The fight ended in a no contest after an accidental clash of heads resulted in a cut on Nemkov's left brow that rendered him unable to continue.

The rematch of the finals took place on November 18, 2022, at Bellator 288. Anderson wasn't able to take down Nemkov, going 0 for 16, and was picked apart from distance on the way to losing the bout via unanimous decision.

Anderson faced Phil Davis on June 16, 2023, at Bellator 297. He won the fight via split decision.

==== Bellator Light Heavyweight Champion ====
After Nemkov vacated the Light Heavyweight title, Anderson faced Karl Moore on March 22, 2024 at Bellator Champions Series 1 for the vacant Bellator Light Heavyweight World Championship. He won the bout and the title via unanimous decision, dominating the wrestling throughout the bout.

=== Professional Fighters League ===
Replacing Ante Delija who withdrew for unknown reasons, Anderson was scheduled to face Vadim Nemkov in a heavyweight bout in their third meeting on January 25, 2025 at Bellator Champions Series 6 (also marketed as PFL Road to Dubai: Champions Series). However, on December 15, Anderson stated that the fight was off because he is "too tough of a fight" for Nemkov.

Anderson faced Denis Goltsov in a heavyweight bout on July 19, 2025, at PFL Champions Series 2. He won the bout via technical knockout in the second round.

==== PFL Light Heavyweight Champion ====
Anderson faced Dovletdzhan Yagshimuradov in a rematch for the inaugural PFL Light Heavyweight Championship on October 3, 2025, at PFL Champions Series 3. He won the bout via unanimous decision.

== Championships and accomplishments ==
- Professional Fighters League
  - PFL Light Heavyweight World Championship. (Current; inaugural)
- Bellator MMA
  - Bellator Light Heavyweight World Championship (One time; final)
- Ultimate Fighting Championship
  - The Ultimate Fighter 19 Tournament Winner
  - Fight of the Night (One time) vs. Gian Villante
  - Performance of the Night (One time) vs. Johnny Walker
  - Most takedowns landed in a UFC Light Heavyweight bout (12) (vs. Patrick Cummins)
  - UFC.com Awards
    - 2014: Newcomer of the Year
    - 2015: Ranked #10 Fight of the Year vs. Gian Villante
    - 2018: Ranked #10 Fighter of the Year (Tied with Thiago Santos & Kamaru Usman) & Ranked #6 Upset of the Year vs. Glover Teixeira
- MMAJunkie.com
  - 2015 April Fight of the Month vs. Gian Villante

== Mixed martial arts record ==
Professional record breakdown
27 matches	20 wins	6 losses
By knockout	9	4
By decision	11	2
No contests	1	

Res.	Record	Opponent	Method	Event	Date	Round	Time	Location	Notes
Win	20–6 (1)	Dovletdzhan Yagshimuradov	Decision (unanimous)	PFL Champions Series 3	October 3, 2025	5	5:00	Dubai, United Arab Emirates	Won the inaugural PFL Light Heavyweight World Championship.
Win	19–6 (1)	Denis Goltsov	TKO (elbows)	PFL Champions Series 2	July 19, 2025	2	3:28	Cape Town, South Africa	Heavyweight bout.
Win	18–6 (1)	Karl Moore	Decision (unanimous)	Bellator Champions Series 1	March 22, 2024	5	5:00	Belfast, Northern Ireland	Won the vacant Bellator Light Heavyweight World Championship.
Win	17–6 (1)	Phil Davis	Decision (split)	Bellator 297	June 16, 2023	3	5:00	Chicago, Illinois, United States	
Loss	16–6 (1)	Vadim Nemkov	Decision (unanimous)	Bellator 288	November 18, 2022	5	5:00	Chicago, Illinois, United States	Bellator Light Heavyweight World Grand Prix Final for the Bellator Light Heavyweight World Championship.
NC	16–5 (1)	Vadim Nemkov	NC (accidental clash of heads)	Bellator 277	April 15, 2022	3	4:55	San Jose, California, United States	Bellator Light Heavyweight World Grand Prix Final for the Bellator Light Heavyweight World Championship. Accidental clash of heads rendered Nemkov unable to continue.
Win	16–5	Ryan Bader	TKO (punches)	Bellator 268	October 16, 2021	1	0:51	Phoenix, Arizona, United States	Bellator Light Heavyweight World Grand Prix Semifinal.
Win	15–5	Dovletdzhan Yagshimuradov	TKO (punches and elbows)	Bellator 257	April 16, 2021	3	2:15	Uncasville, Connecticut, United States	Bellator Light Heavyweight World Grand Prix Quarterfinal.
Win	14–5	Melvin Manhoef	TKO (elbows)	Bellator 251	November 5, 2020	2	2:34	Uncasville, Connecticut, United States	
Loss	13–5	Jan Błachowicz	KO (punch)	UFC Fight Night: Anderson vs. Błachowicz 2	February 15, 2020	1	3:08	Rio Rancho, New Mexico, United States	
Win	13–4	Johnny Walker	TKO (punches)	UFC 244	November 2, 2019	1	2:07	New York City, New York, United States	Performance of the Night.
Win	12–4	Ilir Latifi	Decision (unanimous)	UFC 232	December 29, 2018	3	5:00	Inglewood, California, United States	
Win	11–4	Glover Teixeira	Decision (unanimous)	UFC Fight Night: Shogun vs. Smith	July 22, 2018	3	5:00	Hamburg, Germany	
Win	10–4	Patrick Cummins	Decision (unanimous)	UFC Fight Night: Barboza vs. Lee	April 21, 2018	3	5:00	Atlantic City, New Jersey, United States	
Loss	9–4	Ovince Saint Preux	KO (head kick)	UFC 217	November 4, 2017	3	1:25	New York City, New York, United States	
Loss	9–3	Jimi Manuwa	KO (punch)	UFC Fight Night: Manuwa vs. Anderson	March 18, 2017	1	3:05	London, England	
Win	9–2	Sean O'Connell	TKO (punches)	UFC Fight Night: Lewis vs. Abdurakhimov	December 9, 2016	2	2:36	Albany, New York, United States	
Loss	8–2	Maurício Rua	Decision (split)	UFC 198	May 14, 2016	3	5:00	Curitiba, Brazil	
Win	8–1	Tom Lawlor	Decision (unanimous)	UFC 196	March 5, 2016	3	5:00	Las Vegas, Nevada, United States	
Win	7–1	Fábio Maldonado	Decision (unanimous)	UFC Fight Night: Belfort vs. Henderson 3	November 7, 2015	3	5:00	São Paulo, Brazil	
Win	6–1	Jan Błachowicz	Decision (unanimous)	UFC 191	September 5, 2015	3	5:00	Las Vegas, Nevada, United States	
Loss	5–1	Gian Villante	TKO (punches)	UFC on Fox: Machida vs. Rockhold	April 18, 2015	3	4:18	Newark, New Jersey, United States	Fight of the Night.
Win	5–0	Justin Jones	Decision (unanimous)	UFC 181	December 6, 2014	3	5:00	Las Vegas, Nevada, United States	
Win	4–0	Matt Van Buren	TKO (punches)	The Ultimate Fighter: Team Edgar vs. Team Penn Finale	July 6, 2014	1	1:01	Las Vegas, Nevada, United States	Return to Light Heavyweight. Won The Ultimate Fighter 19 Light Heavyweight Tournament.
Win	3–0	Stephen Flanagan	TKO (punches)	MMA Xtreme: Fists Will Fly	August 24, 2013	1	3:03	Evansville, Indiana, United States	Heavyweight debut.
Win	2–0	Myron Dennis	Decision (unanimous)	Xtreme Fight Night: Vengeance	July 28, 2013	5	5:00	Grant, Oklahoma, United States	
Win	1–0	J.R. Briones	TKO (punches)	North American FC: Battleground	March 29, 2013	1	3:01	Milwaukee, Wisconsin, United States	Light Heavyweight debut.

== Mixed martial arts exhibition record ==
Exhibition record breakdown		
3 matches	3 wins	0 losses
By decision	3	0

Res.	Record	Opponent	Method	Event	Date	Round	Time	Location	Notes
Win	3–0	Patrick Walsh	Decision (unanimous)	The Ultimate Fighter: Team Edgar vs. Team Penn	Jun 25, 2014 (airdate)	3	5:00	Las Vegas, Nevada, United States	The Ultimate Fighter 19 Semi-final round.
Win	2–0	Josh Clark	Decision (majority)	The Ultimate Fighter: Team Edgar vs. Team Penn	May 14, 2014 (airdate)	2	5:00	Las Vegas, Nevada, United States	The Ultimate Fighter 19 Quarterfinal round.
Win	1–0	Kelly Anundson	Decision (unanimous)	The Ultimate Fighter: Team Edgar vs. Team Penn	Apr 16, 2014 (airdate)	2	5:00	Las Vegas, Nevada, United States	The Ultimate Fighter 19 Elimination round.

== See also ==
- List of current Bellator fighters
- List of male mixed martial artists
