= BKB Bare Knuckle Boxing =

Bare knuckle fighting organization

- Formerly: BYB Extreme Fighting Series
- Industry: Bare-knuckle boxing
- Founded: 2015; 11 years ago
- Founder: Dada 5000; Mike Vazquez; Jose Suarez
- Headquarters: Miami, Florida, United States
- Key people: David Tetreault (CEO); Mel Valenzuela (Matchmaker)
- Website: bybextreme.com

BKB Bare Knuckle Boxing, founded as BYB Extreme Fighting Series (BYB), is a bare knuckle fighting organization founded in 2015 by former MMA fighter Dhafir ("Dada 5000") Harris and Mike Vazquez, former owner of NASCAR team HRT Motorsports. Harris rose to fame from his staging of backyard bare knuckle fights which went viral online and subsequently became the subject of the Billy Corben documentary, Dawg Fight. BYB is an abbreviation of "Back Yard Brawl", a nod to the company's origins. BYB's fights are held in its patented Trigon ring or cage, which it touts as the smallest fighting surface in combat sports.

== History ==
BYB announced that its premiere event, Battleship I – originally scheduled to take place aboard the deck of the Resorts World Bimini Superfast – would air on June 5, 2015, shortly after Dawg Fight premiered on Netflix. The event was scrapped from the cruise ship with the organization citing inclement weather, and subsequently held indoors at an undisclosed location in Miami.

BYB went on hiatus following Dada 5000's return to the ring at Bellator 149 in February 2016 with a fight against Kimbo Slice. The promotion would host BYB 2: Brawl for it All in Cheyenne, Wyoming on April 5, 2019, at Cheyenne Ice & Event Center. That event started the current run of numbered BYB events in states including Florida and Mississippi, as well as internationally in London.

=== Partnership with BKB ===
In November 2021, BYB announced a talent exchange partnership with UK-based BKB in which each promotion sends fighters overseas to be featured on the other's cards. The series kicked off at BYB 8 with BKB's Barrie Jones knocking out BYB's Luis Melo in the first round. Through 2022, the companies have hosted 15 trans-continental bare knuckle matchups.

On October 16, 2022, the event featured a mix of BYB vs. BYB, BKB vs. BKB, and BYB vs. BKB fights. The show featured a number of firsts including the first sanctioned professional female bare knuckle fight in UK history (Jamie Driver def. Sonya Dreiling), the first female title match in UK history (Jozette Cotton def. Miranda Barber for the BYB Super Welterweight and Police Gazette Diamond Belt), and Seth Shaffer defeated Carlos Guerra to win the inaugural BYB Welterweight title as well as the Police Gazette Diamond Belt. The event was broadcast live on Stadium.

==== Acquisition of BKB ====
On May 8, 2024, it was announced that BYB Extreme had acquired BKB. Founded in 2015 by Jim Freeman and Joe Smith-Brown, BKB had hosted 40 events prior to the acquisition, some which featured fighters from BYB Extreme. Despite BYB acquiring BKB, both Freeman and Smith-Brown will stay with BYB Extreme in an executive capacity and will oversee the continued expansion of BYB Extreme into Europe.

=== First event in England ===
BYB Extreme held its first event in England, BYB 12: London Brawl, on October 26, 2022. Aside from being the promotion's first event in the United Kingdom, BYB 12 also featured the first-ever women's bare-knuckle fights, highlighted by a title fight between Jozette Cotton and Miranda Barber for the BYB Women's Super Welterweight Championship.

=== First UAE event ===
BYB hosted the first-ever bare-knuckle fighting event in the Middle East with BYB 16: Desert Brawl on March 18, 2023. The event was held at the Dubai Duty Free Tennis Stadium in Dubai, headlined by a Police Gazette Diamond Belt title fight between Jarome Hatch and Marko Martinjak.

=== Rebranding to BKB ===
On February 26, 2025, it was announced that BYB Extreme would rebrand to BKB Bare Knuckle Boxing. BYB Extreme had acquired the Coventry, UK-based promotion BKB in May 2024.

== Media ==
In June 2023, beIN SPORTS announced it secured an exclusive media rights deal with BYB in North America to broadcast "Best of BYB" archive shows as well as five live events, making it the first bare knuckle fighting to air live on linear television. In 2024, BYB announced expanded coverage to Fight Network and Fuse.

In March 2025, BKB signed a multi-fight deal with Vice to carry live fights, becoming the channel's first live programing as it moved into a heavy sports focus. In August 2025, NBC Universal announced that it would carry BKB Bare Knuckle Boxing live in Spanish as a cornerstone program on Telemundo Deportes Ahora.

== Events ==
Event	Date	Location	Notes
BYB Battleship I	June 5, 2015	(United States) Miami, Florida	Bare Knuckle Kickboxing bouts
BYB 2: Brawl for It All	April 5, 2019	(United States) Cheyenne, Wyoming, Cheyenne Ice & Event Center	First Bare Knuckle Boxing tournament on BYB Extreme history
BYB 3: Brawl at the Rock	March 7, 2020	(United States) Hollywood, Florida, Seminole Hard Rock Hotel & Casino Hollywood	
BYB 4	December 3, 2020	(United States) Hollywood, Florida, Seminole Hard Rock Hotel & Casino Hollywood	
BYB US vs. Russia	April 10, 2021	(United States) Miami, Florida, BYB Arena	
BYB 5	May 15, 2021	(United States) Miami, Florida, Tamiami Park Fairgrounds	
BYB 6	July 16, 2021	(United States) Hollywood, Florida, Seminole Hard Rock Hotel & Casino Hollywood	
BYB 7: Brawl by the River	September 11, 2021	(United States) Miami, Florida, James L. Knight Center	Jomi Escoboza def. Rene Rodriguez (Cruiserweight)
BYB 8: Tis the Season to Brawl	December 18, 2021	(United States) Miami, Florida, James L. Knight Center	
BYB 9: Tampa Brawl	March 22, 2022	(United States) Tampa, Florida, Florida State Fairgrounds	Jose Fernandez def. JD Burns (Super Middleweight)
BYB X: Biloxi Brawl	May 28, 2022	(United States) Biloxi, Mississippi, Mississippi Coast Coliseum	Tony Lopez def. Jordan Mitchell (BYB Heavyweight); Paty Juarez def. Monica Medina (PG Diamond)
BYB 11: Brawl in Doral	August 27, 2022	(United States) Doral, Florida, Trump National Doral Miami	
BYB 12: London Brawl	October 16, 2022	London, England, Indigo at The O2	Seth Shaffer def. Carlos Guerra (BYB Welterweight, PG Diamond); Jozette Cotton def. Miranda Barber (BYB Super Welterweight, PG Diamond)
BYB 13: Tampa Brawl For It All	November 19, 2022	(United States) Tampa, Florida, Florida State Fairgrounds	Desmond Green def. Scott McHugh (BYB Middleweight, PG Diamond); DJ Linderman def. Tony Lopez (BYB Heavyweight)
BYB 14: Carolina Brawl	December 9, 2022	(United States) Rock Hill, South Carolina, Rock Hill Sports & Event Center	First BK fight in SC history; Sam Liera def. LT Nelson (BYB Interim Super Middleweight)
BYB 15: Broward Brawl	February 3, 2023	(United States) Miramar, Florida, Miramar National Guard Armory	
BYB 16: Desert Brawl	March 18, 2023	Dubai, United Arab Emirates, Dubai Duty Free Tennis Stadium	First BK fight in UAE/Gulf Region history; Jarome Hatch def. BKB's Marko Martinjak (PG Diamond)
BYB Trigon Combat	April 27, 2023	(United States) Costa Mesa, California, The Hangar at OC Fair & Event Center	First gloved event in BYB history
BYB 17: Brawl at Rock Hill	May 13, 2023	(United States) Rock Hill, South Carolina, Rock Hill Sports & Event Center	Mark Irwin def. Joshua Oxendine (BYB Lightweight); Jozette Cotton (c) def. Jamie Driver (PG Diamond)
BYB 18: Police Gazette International Cup	Jun 25, 2023	London, England, Indigo at The O2	Team USA (BYB) def. Team UK (BKB) 6–3; Barrie Jones def. Tommy Turner (PG Diamond); Marko Martinjak (c) def. Jarome Hatch (PG Diamond)
BYB 19: Brawl in the Pines	August 10, 2023	(United States) Pembroke Pines, Florida, Charles F. Dodge Center	Brandon Birr def. Harold McQueen (BYB Featherweight); Carlos Alexandre def. Andre Ewell (BYB Welterweight); Sam Liera def. Jose Fernandez (BYB Super Middleweight); LT Nelson draw James Connelly (PG Diamond)
BYB 20: Brawl on the Bayou	September 16, 2023	(United States) Biloxi, Mississippi, Mississippi Coast Coliseum	Monica Medina def. (c) Paty Juarez (BYB Lightweight, PG Diamond)
BYB 21: Fall Brawl	October 21, 2023	(United States) Rock Hill, South Carolina, Rock Hill Sports & Event Center	DJ Linderman (C) def. Rashad Coulter (BYB Heavyweight)
BYB 22: Rocky Mountain Brawl	December 2, 2023	(United States) Denver, Colorado, Stockyard Event Center	LT Nelson vs. Robert Serna (BYB Super Middleweight); Julio Tanori def. Mark Irwin (c) (BYB Lightweight); Paty Juarez def. Monica Medina (c) (BYB Lightweight)
BYB 23: Brawl in the Pines II	January 18, 2024	(United States) Pembroke Pines, Florida, Charles F. Dodge Center	Marko Martinjak (c) def. Jarome Hatch (PG Diamond); Cub Hawkins def. Daniel Lerwell (PG Diamond 185)
BYB 24: Super Brawl Saturday	February 10, 2024	(United States) Biloxi, Mississippi, Mississippi Coast Coliseum	Ike Villanueva def. DJ Linderman (BYB Heavyweight); Harold McQueen def. Brandon Birr (BYB Featherweight)
BYB 25: Brawl on the Bay	April 4, 2024	(United States) Tampa, Florida, Florida State Fairgrounds	Cub Hawkins def. Ryan Jett (BYB Light Heavyweight); Agnesa Kirakosian def. Shelby Cannon (BYB Super Flyweight)
BYB 26: Mile High Brawl	May 10, 2024	(United States) Denver, Colorado, Stockyards Event Center	LT Nelson def. Tommy Turner (BYB Middleweight)
BYB 27: Brawl in Duval	June 14, 2024	(United States) Jacksonville, Florida, Prime Osborn Convention Center	
BYB 28: Bourbon Street Brawl	June 14, 2024	(United States) New Orleans, Louisiana, Alario Center	Gustavo Trujillo def. Ike Villanueva (BYB Heavyweight and PG World Diamond); Helen Peralta def. Monica Medina (BYB Featherweight)
BYB 29: Brawl in the Pines III	August 10, 2024	(United States) Pembroke Pines, Florida, Charles F. Dodge Center	Gregoris Cisneros def. Cub Hawkins (BYB Light Heavyweight)
BYB 30: Cardiff Brawl	August 17, 2024	Cardiff, Wales, Vale Arena	LT Nelson def. Barrie Jones (PG World Diamond)
BYB 31: Stockyard Brawl	August 17, 2024	(United States) Denver, Colorado, Stockyards Event Center	Khortni Kamyron def. Paty Juarez (BYB Super Lightweight); Julio Tanori def. Mark Irwin (BYB Lightweight)
BYB 32: Leeds Brawl	October 12, 2024	(United Kingdom) Leeds, England, John Charles Centre for Sport	Harry Gigliotti def. Joe Fitzpatrick (BYB Super Lightweight); Liam Rees def. Scott McHugh (BYB Super Welterweight)
BYB 33: Wolverhampton Brawl	November 9, 2024	(United Kingdom) Wolverhampton, England, The Hangar	Marko Martinjak def. Brad Scott (BYB Super Cruiserweight); Dan Podmore def. Ryan Barrett (BYB Bridgerweight)
BYB 34: Brawl in the Pines IV	December 6, 2024	(United States) Pembroke Pines, Florida, Charles F. Dodge Center	Gustavo Trujillo def. Richie Leak (Unified BYB-BKB Heavyweight Title); Jamie Driver def. Sonya Dreiling (BYB Welterweight)
BYB 35: Albuquerque Brawl	January 11, 2025	(United States) Albuquerque, New Mexico, Revel ABQ	Javon Wright def. Walter Saravia (Vacant BYB Welterweight)
BYB 36: Cardiff Brawl II	February 1, 2025	Cardiff, Wales, Vale Arena	Barrie Jones def. Gregoris Cisneros (BYB Light Heavyweight)
BYB 37: Denver Brawl IV	February 22, 2025	(United States) Denver, Colorado, Stockyards Event Center	Harry Gigliotii def. Jon Barnard (BKB Super Lightweight)
BKB 38: Wolves Brawl II	March 22, 2025	(United Kingdom) Wolverhampton, England, The Hangar|	LT Nelson def. James Connelly (BKB Super Middleweight)
BKB 39: Brawl at the Beach	April 4, 2025	(United States) Myrtle Beach, South Carolina, John T. Rhodes Sports Center |	Cub Hawkins def. Jack Marshman (BKB Cruiserweight)
BKB 40: Cardiff Brawl III	April 19, 2025	Cardiff, Wales, Vale Arena |	Liam Rees def. Martin Reffell (BKB Super Welterweight) Dan Podmore def. Emil Markic (BKB Bridgerweight)
BKB 41: Brawl in Duval II	May 31, 2025	(United States) Jacksonville, Florida, Prime Osborn Convention Center	Jarod Grant def. Jorge Bargallo (BKB Interim Lightweight)
BKB 42: Music City Brawl	June 21, 2025	(United States) Nashville, Tennessee, The Pinnacle	LT Nelson def. Sam Liera (BKB Super Middleweight) ; Javon Wright def. Carlos Guerra (BKB Welterweight)
BKB 43: Bolton Brawl	July 5, 2025	(United Kingdom) Bolton, England, The Hideout	Harry Gigliotti def. Kallum Skhane (BKB Super Lightweight)
BKB 44: Denver Brawl V	August 16, 2025	(United States) Denver, Colorado, Stockyards Event Center	Paty Juarez def. Khortni Kamyron (BKB Lightweight)

== Weight classes ==
Division	Upper weight limit
Heavyweight	265 lb (120 kg)
Bridgerweight	225 lb (102 kg)
Super Cruiserweight	205 lb (93 kg)
Cruiserweight	185 lb (84 kg)
Light Heavyweight	175 lb (79 kg)
Super Middleweight	168 lb (76 kg)
Middleweight	160 lb (73 kg)
Super Welterweight	154 lb (70 kg)
Welterweight	147 lb (67 kg)
Super Lightweight	140 lb (64 kg)
Lightweight	135 lb (61 kg)
Super Featherweight	130 lb (59 kg)
Featherweight	125 lb (57 kg)

== Current champions ==
=== Men's ===
As of 14 November 2026

Weight class	Champion	Date won
Featherweight	Yampier Ramirez	March 29, 2026
Super Featherweight	Alberto Blas	January 31, 2026
Lightweight	Jon Barnard	April 17, 2026
Super Lightweight	Estevan Partida	May 16, 2026
Welterweight	Javon Wright	January 11, 2025
Super Welterweight	Rolando Gabriel Dy	December 5, 2025
Middleweight	LT Nelson	May 10, 2024
Super Middleweight	LT Nelson	December 2, 2023
Light Heavyweight	Cub Hawkins	November 22, 2025
Cruiserweight	Yuniesky Gonzalez	August 29, 2026
Super Cruiserweight	Julian Fernandez	March 28, 2026
Bridgerweight	Marko Martinjak	October 18, 2025
Heavyweight	Gustavo Trujillo	July 13, 2024

=== Women's ===
As of 14 November 2026

Weight class	Champion	Date won
Super Flyweight	Agnesa Kirakosian	April 4, 2024
Featherweight	Helen Peralta	July 13, 2024
Lightweight	Paty Juarez	December 2, 2023
Super Lightweight	Khortni Kamyron	August 17, 2024
Welterweight	Jamie Driver	December 6, 2024

=== Police Gazette World Diamond Belt ===
As of 14 November 2026

Weight class	Champion	Date won
Women's Lightweight	Monica Medina	September 16, 2023
Women's Super Welterweight	Jozette Cotton	October 16, 2022
Middleweight	Desmond Green	November 19, 2022
Super Middleweight	LT Nelson	August 17, 2024
Light Heavyweight	Cub Hawkins	January 18, 2024
Heavyweight	Gustavo Trujillo	July 13, 2024

== Men's championship history ==
=== Heavyweight Championship ===
Weight limit: 265 lbs (120 kg)

No.	Name	Event	Date	Defenses
1	(United States) Tony Lopez def. Jordan Mitchell	BYB X: Biloxi Brawl; Biloxi, Mississippi	May 22, 2022	
2	(United States) DJ Linderman	BYB 13: Tampa Brawl For It All; Tampa, Florida	November 22, 2022	1. def. Rashad Coulter at BYB 21: Fall Brawl on October 21, 2023
3	(United States) Ike Villanueva	BYB 24: Super Brawl Saturday; Biloxi, Mississippi	February 10, 2024	
4	(Cuba) Gustavo Trujillo	BYB 28: Bourbon Street Brawl; New Orleans, Louisiana	June 14, 2024	1. def. Richie Leak at BYB 34: Brawl in the Pines IV on December 6, 2024; 2. def. Lucas Browne at BKB 48: Night of Four Kings on November 22, 2025; 3. def. Mick Terrill at BKB 58: Miami on August 29, 2026

=== Bridgerweight Championship ===
Weight limit: 225 lbs (102 kg)

No.	Name	Event	Date	Defenses
1	(England) Dan Podmore def. Ryan Barrett	BYB 33: Wolverhampton Brawl; Wolverhampton, England, The Hangar	November 9, 2024	1. def. Emil Markic at BKB 40: Cardiff Brawl III on April 19, 2025
2	(Croatia) Marko Martinjak	BKB 47: Leeds Brawl II; Leeds, England	October 18, 2025	1. def. Ike Villanueva at BKB 51: Heavy Lies The Crown on February 21, 2026
3	(England) Matty Askin	BKB 61: England; London, England	November 14, 2026	

=== Super Cruiserweight Championship ===
Weight limit: 200 lbs (90.7 kg)

No.	Name	Event	Date	Defenses
1	(Croatia) Marko Martinjak def. Brad Scott	BYB 33: Wolverhampton Brawl; Wolverhampton, England, The Hangar	November 9, 2024	
Martinjak vacated the title on October 23, 2025, to focus on the Bridgerweight division.
Julian Fernandez and Yordan Fuentes fought to a No-Contest on November 22, 2025, at BKB 48: Knight of Four Kings for the title.
2	(Mexico) Julian Fernandez def. Alex Wilson	BKB 52: No Turning Back; Ledyard, Connecticut, Foxwoods Resort Casino	March 28, 2026	1. def. Dan Podmore at BKB 59: Tijuana on September 19, 2026

=== Cruiserweight Championship ===
Weight limit: 185 lbs (84 kg)

No.	Name	Event	Date	Defenses
1	(Dominican Republic) Jomi Escoboza def. Rene Rodriguez	BYB 7: Brawl by the River; Miami, Florida, James L. Knight Center	September 11, 2021	
The Cruiserweight title was vacated.
2	(United States) Cub Hawkins def. Daniel Lerwell	BYB 23: Brawl in the Pines II; Pembroke Pines, Florida, Charles F. Dodge Center	January 18, 2024	1. def. Zion Tomlinson Sr. at BYB 34: Brawl in the Pines IV on December 6, 2024; 2. def. Jack Marshman at BKB 39: Brawl at the Beach on April 4, 2025
The Cruiserweight title was vacated.
3	(Cuba) Yuniesky Gonzalez def. Ethan George	BKB 58: Miami; Miami, Florida, James L. Knight Center	August 29, 2026	

=== Light Heavyweight Championship ===
Weight limit: 175 lbs (79 kg)

No.	Name	Event	Date	Defenses
1	(United States) Cub Hawkins def. Ryan Jett	BYB 25: Brawl on the Bay; Tampa, Florida, Florida State Fairgrounds	April 4, 2024	
2	(Venezuela) Gregoris Cisneros	BYB 29: Brawl in the Pines III; Pembroke Pines, Florida Charles F. Dodge Center	August 10, 2024	
3	(Wales) Barrie Jones	BYB 36: Cardiff Brawl II; Cardiff, Wales, Vale Arena	February 1, 2025	
4	(United States) Cub Hawkins (2)	BKB 48: Night of Four Kings; Pembroke Pines, Florida Charles F. Dodge Center	November 22, 2025	1. def. Jesse Ronson at BKB 52: No Turning Back on March 28, 2026

=== Super Middleweight Championship ===
Weight limit: 168 Ibs (76 kg)

No.	Name	Event	Date	Defenses
1	(United States) Jose Fernandez def. JD Burns	BYB 9: Tampa Brawl; Tampa, Florida, Florida State Fairgrounds	March 22, 2022	
-	(United States) Sam Liera def. LT Nelson for interim title	BYB 14: Carolina Brawl; Rock Hill, South Carolina, Rock Hill Sports & Event Center	December 9, 2022	
2	(United States) Sam Liera	BYB 19: Brawl in the Pines; Pembroke Pines, Florida, Charles F. Dodge Center	August 10, 2023	
Liera retired.
3	(South Africa) LT Nelson def. Robert Serna	BYB 22: Rocky Mountain Brawl; Denver, Colorado, Stockyard Event Center	December 2, 2023	1. def. James Connelly at BKB 38: Wolves Brawl II on March 22, 2025; 2. def. Sam Liera at BKB 42: Music City Brawl on June 21, 2025

=== Middleweight Championship ===
Weight limit: 160 lb (73 kg)

No.	Name	Event	Date	Defenses
1	(United States) Desmond Green def. Scott McHugh	BYB 13: Tampa Brawl For It All; Tampa, Florida, Florida State Fairgrounds	November 19, 2022	
The Middleweight title was vacated.
2	(South Africa) LT Nelson def. Tommy Turner	BYB 26: Mile High Brawl; Denver, Colorado, Stockyards Event Center	May 10, 2024	1. def. Mark Tiffin at BKB 53: The Harder They Fall on April 17, 2026

=== Super Welterweight Championship ===
Weight limit: 154 lb (70 kg)

No.	Name	Event	Date	Defenses
1	(Wales) Liam Rees def. Scott McHugh	BYB 32: Leeds Brawl; Leeds, England, John Charles Centre for Sport	October 12, 2024	1. def. Martin Reffell at BKB 40: Cardiff Brawl III on April 19, 2025
2	(Philippines) Rolando Dy	BKB 49: Dance of the Dragons; Cardiff, Wales, Vale Arena	December 5, 2025	1. def. Paulie Malignaggi at BKB 54: Mayhem in Manchester on May 16, 2026 2. def. Scott McHugh at BKB 60: Manchester on October 10, 2026

=== Welterweight Championship ===
Weight limit: 147 lbs (67 kg)

No.	Name	Event	Date	Defenses
1	(United States) Seth Shaffer def. Carlos Guerra	BYB 12: London Brawl; London, England, Indigo at The O2	October 16, 2022	
The Welterweight title was vacated.
2	(Brazil) Carlos Alexandre def. Andre Ewell	BYB 19: Brawl in the Pines; Pembroke Pines, Florida, Charles F. Dodge Center	August 10, 2023	
The Welterweight title was vacated.
3	(United States) Javon Wright def. Walter Saravia	BYB 35: Albuquerque Brawl; Albuquerque, New Mexico, Revel ABQ	January 11, 2025	1. def. Carlos Guerra at BKB 42: Music City Brawl on June 21, 2025 2. def. Dan Gittens at BKB 54: Mayhem in Manchester on May 16, 2026

=== Super Lightweight Championship ===
Weight limit: 140 lbs (64 kg)

No.	Name	Event	Date	Defenses
1	(United States) Harry Gigliotti def. Joe Fitzpatrick	BYB 32: Leeds Brawl; Leeds, England, John Charles Centre for Sport	October 12, 2024	1. def. Jon Barnard at BYB 37: Denver Brawl IV on February 22, 2025; 2. def. Kallum Skhane at BKB 43: Bolton Brawl on July 5, 2025
Gigliotti vacated the title on January 5, 2026 to fight for the BKFC
2	(United States) Estevan Partida def. Kallum Skhane	BKB 54: Mayhem in Manchester; Manchester, United Kingdom, AO Arena	May 16, 2026	

=== Lightweight Championship ===
Weight limit: 135 lbs (61 kg)

No.	Name	Event	Date	Defenses
1	(United States) Mark Irwin def. Joshua Oxendine	BYB 17: Brawl at Rock Hill; Rock Hill, South Carolina, Rock Hill Sports & Event Center	May 13, 2023	
2	(Mexico) Julio Tanori	BYB 22: Rocky Mountain Brawl; Denver, Colorado, Stockyard Event Center	December 2, 2023	1. def. Mark Irwin at BYB 31: Stockyard Brawl on September 21, 2024
-	(United States) Jarod Grant def. Jorge Bargallo for interim title	BKB 41: Brawl in Duval II; Jacksonville, Florida,Prime Osborn Convention Center	May 31, 2025	
Tanori was stripped of the title due to inactivity defending it.
3	(United States) Jarod Grant promoted to undisputed champion		September, 2025	NC vs. Jon Barnard at BKB 48: Night of Four Kings on November 22, 2025
4	(United States) Jon Barnard	BKB 53: The Harder They Fall; Niagara Falls, New York, Seneca Niagara Resort & Casino	April 17, 2026	

=== Super Featherweight Championship ===
Weight limit: 130 lbs (59 kg)

No.	Name	Event	Date	Defenses
1	(Cuba) Alberto Blas def. Harold McQueen	BKB 50: Evolution; Miami, Florida, James L. Knight Center	January 31, 2026	1. def. Brandon Birr at BKB 58: Miami on August 29, 2026

=== Featherweight Championship ===
Weight limit: 125 lbs (57 kg)

No.	Name	Event	Date	Defenses
1	(United States) Brandon Birr def. Harold McQueen	BYB 19: Brawl in the Pines; Pembroke Pines, Florida, Charles F. Dodge Cente	August 10, 2023	
2	(United States) Harold McQueen	BYB 24: Super Brawl Saturday; Biloxi, Mississippi, Mississippi Coast Coliseum	February 10, 2024	
McQueen was stripped of the title on September 26, 2025 after failing to show up for weigh-ins for his scheduled title defense against Yampier Ramirez.
3	(Cuba) Yampier Ramirez def. Ash Williams	BKB 52: No Turning Back; Ledyard, Connecticut, Foxwoods Resort Casino	March 28, 2026	

== Women's championship history ==
=== Super Welterweight Championship ===
Weight limit: 154 lb (70 kg)

No.	Name	Event	Date	Defenses
1	(United States) Jozette Cotton def. Miranda Barber	BYB 12: London Brawl; London, England, Indigo at The O2	October 16, 2022	1. def. Jamie Driver at BYB 17: Brawl at Rock Hill on May 13, 2023
Cotton vacated the title. The title is currently defunct and no longer an active weight class.

=== Welterweight Championship ===
Weight limit: 147 lb (67 kg)

No.	Name	Event	Date	Defenses
1	(United States) Jamie Driver def. Sonya Dreiling	BYB 34: Brawl in the Pines IV; Pembroke Pines, Florida, Charles F. Dodge Center	December 6, 2024	1. def. Bianca Daimoni at BKB 50: Evolution on January 31, 2026

== Partnership with BKB ==
In November 2021, BYB announced a talent exchange partnership with UK-based BKB in which each promotion sends fighters overseas to be featured on the other's cards. The series kicked off at BYB 8 with BKB's Barrie Jones knocking out BYB's Luis Melo in the first round. Through 2022, the companies have hosted 15 trans-continental bare knuckle matchups.

On October 16, 2022, the event featured a mix of BYB vs. BYB, BKB vs. BKB, and BYB vs. BKB fights. The show featured a number of firsts including the first sanctioned professional female bare knuckle fight in UK history (Jamie Driver def. Sonya Dreiling), the first female title match in UK history (Jozette Cotton def. Miranda Barber for the BYB Super Welterweight and Police Gazette Diamond Belt), and Seth Shaffer defeated Carlos Guerra to win the inaugural BYB Welterweight title as well as the Police Gazette Diamond Belt. The event was broadcast live on Stadium.

=== Acquisition of BKB ===
On May 8, 2024, it was announced that BYB Extreme had acquired BKB. Founded in 2015 by Jim Freeman and Joe Smith-Brown, BKB had hosted 40 events prior to the acquisition, some which featured fighters from BYB Extreme. Despite BYB acquiring BKB, both Freeman and Smith-Brown will stay with BYB Extreme in an executive capacity and will oversee the continued expansion of BYB Extreme into Europe.

== Trigon ==
In 2015, BYB and its parent company Lights Out Productions filed for a patent on its triangular shaped ring and cage, which they note is the smallest in combat sports. The patent was granted on December 19, 2017.

In 2021, Triller announced that it would host Triad Combat in a triangular ring. BYB in turn filed a lawsuit against alleging copyright infringement.

== Notable fighters on roster ==
- (United States) Victor Ortiz
- (United States) Joseph Diaz
- (Mexico) Alfredo Angulo
- (Cuba) Yuriorkis Gamboa
- (United States) Aspen Ladd
- (United States) Ike Villanueva
- (Tunisia) Hamza Hamry
- (Dominican Republic) Helen Peralta
- (Northern Ireland) Joe Fitzpatrick
- (Philippines) Rolando Dy
- (United States) Jarod Grant
- (United Kingdom) Brad Scott
- (Wales) Lee Selby
- (Wales) Ash Williams
- (United States) Bubba McDaniel
- (Canada) Jesse Ronson
- (Australia) Lucas Browne

== Staff ==
BYB boasts and number of high-profile personalities on its broadcast team including former UFC commentator Mike Goldberg, 2-time boxing champion Paulie Malignaggi, Ring Announcer 'Big Mo' Kody Mommaerts, Benny Ricardo, and Claudia Trejos. Longtime WWE producer Nelson Sweglar is BYB's broadcast producer. In September 2022, BYB announced the hiring of Gregory Bloom as CEO.

- Ring announcer: Kody Mommaerts

=== Commentary team ===
- Mike Goldberg (Play-by-play)
- Paulie Malignaggi (Analyst)
- Claudia Trejos (Spanish play-by-play)
- Benny Ricardo (Spanish analyst)

=== Honors ===
Vazquez, Harris and matchmaker Mel Valenzuela were each inductees into the Bare Knuckle Boxing Hall of Fame's class of 2022. BYB champions Tony Lopez and Paty Juarez were also honored during the 2022 celebration. Malignaggi, Ricardo, Trejos, and Goldberg were inducted as part of the 2023 class.

== See also ==
- Bare Knuckle Fighting Championship
- List of boxing organisations
