= Katie Taylor vs. Amanda Serrano III =

Sporting event - Boxing

- Date: July 11, 2025
- Venue: Madison Square Garden, New York City, U.S.
- Title(s) on the line: Undisputed Super Lightweight Championship

Tale of the tape
Boxer	Katie Taylor	Amanda Serrano
Nickname	The Bray Bomber	The Real Deal
Hometown	Bray, Ireland	Carolina, Puerto Rico
Pre-fight record	25–1 (6 KO)	47–4–1 (31 KO)
Style	Orthodox	Southpaw

Result
- Taylor wins via majority decision (97–93, 97–93, 95–95)

Katie Taylor vs. Amanda Serrano III was a professional women's boxing match contested on July 11, 2025, at Madison Square Garden in New York City. It was the third meeting between undisputed light-welterweight champion Katie Taylor and seven-division world champion Amanda Serrano. The bout headlined an all-women’s boxing card streamed globally on Netflix. Taylor won by majority decision to retain her titles, completing a 3–0 sweep of the trilogy.

== Background ==
Taylor and Serrano's first match was in April of 2022 at Madison Square Garden, where Taylor won a split decision in a bout widely regarded as a landmark for women’s boxing. A rematch followed in November 2024, where Taylor again defeated Serrano by unanimous decision.

In March 2025, a trilogy bout was officially announced for July 11, 2025, at Madison Square Garden, promoted by Most Valuable Promotions and broadcast on Netflix.

== The fight ==
The fight was contested over ten two-minute rounds. Unlike their previous high-intensity encounters, the trilogy bout was more tactical and cautious in nature.

Both fighters landed 70 punches each, with Serrano throwing more overall, but struggling to land cleaner shots.

After ten rounds, the judges scored the bout 97–93, 97–93 and 95–95 in favor of Taylor, awarding her a majority decision victory.

== Fight card ==
The event featured an all-women’s main card and included multiple world title bouts. Taylor vs. Serrano was the Main Event.

== Aftermath ==
With the victory, Taylor rose to a 3–0 record against Serrano across their trilogy, which spanned 30 total rounds of boxing.

The event drew approximately 6 million viewers globally on Netflix, making it one of the most-watched women’s professional sporting events of all time.
