= UFC 257 =

UFC mixed martial arts event in 2021

UFC 257: Poirier vs. McGregor 2
- The poster for UFC 257: Poirier vs. McGregor 2
- Promotion: Ultimate Fighting Championship
- Date: January 24, 2021
- Venue: Etihad Arena
- City: Abu Dhabi, United Arab Emirates
- Attendance: 2,600
- Buyrate: 1,504,737

Event chronology
UFC on ESPN: Chiesa vs. Magny	UFC 257: Poirier vs. McGregor 2	UFC Fight Night: Overeem vs. Volkov

UFC 257: Poirier vs. McGregor 2 was a mixed martial arts event produced by the Ultimate Fighting Championship that took place on January 24, 2021 at the Etihad Arena on Yas Island, Abu Dhabi, United Arab Emirates.

== Background ==
Starting with UFC on ABC: Holloway vs. Kattar, a limited number of fans were allowed inside the newly built Etihad Arena, marking the first time since UFC 248 on March 7, 2020, that non-essential event personnel were in attendance. The venue has maximum capacity of over 18,000, but the UFC was expecting to have closer to 2,000 fans for each of the Fight Island's events during the week.

For the event to be broadcast live during Prime time hours on the east coast of North America, the main card began at 7:00 am (January 24) local time in Abu Dhabi, with a full preliminary card beginning at approximately 4:00 am Gulf Standard Time.

A lightweight rematch between former UFC Featherweight and Lightweight Champion Conor McGregor and former interim champion Dustin Poirier headlined this event. They met previously in a featherweight bout at UFC 178 on September 27, 2014, where McGregor won by first-round TKO.

After defending his lightweight title at UFC 254 in October, Khabib Nurmagomedov immediately announced his retirement, citing his father's death from complications related to COVID-19 in last July as the main reason behind it. Despite his announcement, the title was never officially vacated as UFC President Dana White said several times that he believed Nurmagomedov would still fight again. A meeting between both of them to discuss the champion's future was then expected to happen this week during the organization's stint at Fight Island, eventually taking place on January 15. The following day, White made an appearance live on ABC during the main card of UFC on ABC: Holloway vs. Kattar and revealed the outcome of the meeting: the Russian left the door open to a potential return, depending on how the main and co-main event fighters perform at this event, while also praising Charles Oliveira's performance at UFC 256. Despite White's announcement, Nurmagomedov indicated in another interview that "fighting again is not in my plans".

A bantamweight bout between promotional newcomers Umar Nurmagomedov and Sergey Morozov was initially scheduled to take place at UFC 254, but Nurmagomedov pulled out due to an illness. The pairing was then rescheduled for this event. Finally, the bout was set to take place 3 days prior at UFC on ESPN: Chiesa vs. Magny.

A flyweight bout between Amir Albazi and Zhalgas Zhumagulov was expected to take place at UFC on ESPN: Smith vs. Clark, but Zhumagulov pulled out due to visa issues and the bout was rescheduled for this event.

Former Invicta FC Atomweight Champion Michelle Waterson was expected to face Amanda Ribas in a women's strawweight bout at this event. However, Waterson pulled out of the bout in early December due to undisclosed reasons. She was replaced by Marina Rodriguez.

Tagir Ulanbekov was briefly scheduled to face returning veteran Matheus Nicolau in a flyweight bout. However, Ulanbekov withdrew in late December due to undisclosed reasons. The pairing was eventually rescheduled for UFC Fight Night: Edwards vs. Chimaev on March 13.

A middleweight bout between The Ultimate Fighter: Team Joanna vs. Team Cláudia light heavyweight winner Andrew Sanchez and André Muniz was expected to take place at this event. In late December, Muniz withdrew due to an injury and was replaced by Makhmud Muradov.

A women's bantamweight bout between The Ultimate Fighter: Team Rousey vs. Team Tate bantamweight winner Julianna Peña and former UFC Women's Bantamweight Championship challenger Sara McMann (also 2004 Olympic silver medalist in wrestling) was originally scheduled to take place a week earlier at UFC on ABC: Holloway vs. Kattar, but it was eventually pushed back to this event.

A featherweight bout between Shane Burgos and Hakeem Dawodu was scheduled for the event. However, on January 9, Dawodu was forced to withdraw from the bout citing a shoulder injury. The UFC confirmed three days later that Burgos was also injured and the bout was canceled.

On the day of the weigh-ins, a couple of lightweight bouts suffered major changes due to several issues: Ottman Azaitar and Matt Frevola were scheduled to meet in the preliminary portion of the event. However, it was announced that Azaitar was pulled from the bout and had his contract terminated after it was determined that he had violated COVID-19 health and safety protocols, as he attempted to help others enter the UFC's designated safety zone. The other bout that suffered alterations featured Nasrat Haqparast and Arman Tsarukyan. Haqparast withdrew from the bout due to an undisclosed illness and Tsarukyan weighed in at 157 pounds, one pound over the lightweight non-title fight limit. As a result, the promotion arranged a catchweight bout between Frevola and Tsarukyan to keep both athletes on the card. Subsequently, Tsarukyan forfeited 20% of his purse to Frevola as a result of missing weight.

== Results ==
Main card
Weight class				Method	Round	Time	Notes
Lightweight	Dustin Poirier	def.	Conor McGregor	TKO (punches)	2	2:32
Lightweight	Michael Chandler	def.	Dan Hooker	TKO (punches)	1	2:30
Women's Flyweight	Joanne Calderwood	def.	Jessica Eye	Decision (unanimous) (30–27, 30–27, 29–28)	3	5:00
Middleweight	Makhmud Muradov	def.	Andrew Sanchez	TKO (flying knee and punches)	3	2:59
Women's Strawweight	Marina Rodriguez	def.	Amanda Ribas	TKO (elbow and punches)	2	0:54
Preliminary card (ESPN / ESPN+)
Catchweight (157 lb)	Arman Tsarukyan	def.	Matt Frevola	Decision (unanimous) (30–27, 30–27, 30–26)	3	5:00
Middleweight	Brad Tavares	def.	Antônio Carlos Júnior	Decision (unanimous) (30–27, 30–27, 29–28)	3	5:00
Women's Bantamweight	Julianna Peña	def.	Sara McMann	Submission (rear-naked choke)	3	3:39
Light Heavyweight	Marcin Prachnio	def.	Khalil Rountree Jr.	Decision (unanimous) (29–28, 29–28, 29–28)	3	5:00
Early preliminary card (ESPN+ / UFC Fight Pass)
Catchweight (150 lb)	Movsar Evloev	def.	Nik Lentz	Decision (split) (28–29, 29–28, 29–28)	3	5:00
Flyweight	Amir Albazi	def.	Zhalgas Zhumagulov	Decision (unanimous) (29–28, 29–28, 29–28)	3	5:00

== Bonus awards ==
The following fighters received $50,000 bonuses.

- Fight of the Night: No bonus awarded.
- Performance of the Night: Dustin Poirier, Michael Chandler, Makhmud Muradov and Marina Rodriguez

== See also ==
- List of UFC events
- List of current UFC fighters
- 2021 in UFC
