= Fight Island =

Mixed martial arts events

- Interactive map of Fight Island
- Coordinates: 24.5012°N 54.6095°E

Fight Island is a series of Ultimate Fighting Championship (UFC) mixed martial arts events held on Yas Island in Abu Dhabi, United Arab Emirates in 2020 and 2021 during the COVID-19 pandemic.

Dana White stated that the events were intended as a workaround for travel restrictions tied to the COVID-19 pandemic, which had been preventing some international fighters from entering the United States. White initially referred to the proposed site as a "private island" or "fight island".

Until 2021, all Fight Island events were held behind closed doors in the du Forum; a bio-secure bubble was established, which consisted of a "safe zone" comprising hotels, training facilities, the beach, and restaurants. All participants and staff were required to test negative for SARS-CoV-2 multiple times before traveling to or entering the bubble, and individuals entering the arena were required to go through disinfecting "mist tunnels". As the events were closed to the public, they were scheduled for U.S. primetime hours rather than local time, with UFC 251's preliminaries beginning at 2:00 a.m. Gulf Standard Time.

John Oliver suggested on Last Week Tonight that the name "Fight Island" was inspired by a suggestion made by a TMZ reporter one week before the trademark was filed. Shortly after Oliver had suggested various alternative names for the island including "UF-Sea", Zuffa registered "UFSEA" as a trademark.

Beginning with UFC on ABC: Holloway vs. Kattar on January 16, 2021, the UFC moved its Fight Island events to Yas Island's newly opened Etihad Arena, capped at 2,000 of its 18,000-seat capacity. They were the first UFC events open to the public since the onset of the pandemic.

== Events ==
Event	Date	Venue	Ref.
UFC 251: Usman vs. Masvidal	Jul 12, 2020	du Forum	
UFC on ESPN: Kattar vs. Ige	Jul 16, 2020	du Forum	
UFC Fight Night: Figueiredo vs. Benavidez 2	Jul 19, 2020	du Forum	
UFC on ESPN: Whittaker vs. Till	Jul 26, 2020	du Forum	
UFC 253: Adesanya vs. Costa	Sep 27, 2020	du Forum	
UFC on ESPN: Holm vs. Aldana	Oct 4, 2020	du Forum	
UFC Fight Night: Moraes vs. Sandhagen	Oct 11, 2020	du Forum	
UFC Fight Night: Ortega vs. The Korean Zombie	Oct 18, 2020	du Forum	
UFC 254: Khabib vs. Gaethje	Oct 24, 2020	du Forum	
UFC on ABC: Holloway vs. Kattar	Jan 16, 2021	Etihad Arena	
UFC on ESPN: Chiesa vs. Magny	Jan 20, 2021	Etihad Arena	
UFC 257: Poirier vs. McGregor 2	Jan 24, 2021	Etihad Arena	
UFC 267: Błachowicz vs. Teixeira	Oct 30, 2021	Etihad Arena	
UFC 280: Oliveira vs. Makhachev	Oct 22, 2022	Etihad Arena	
UFC 294: Makhachev vs. Volkanovski 2	Oct 21, 2023	Etihad Arena	

== See also ==
- 2020 in UFC
- 2021 in UFC
- 2022 in UFC
- Impact of the COVID-19 pandemic on sports
