= UFC on ESPN: Chiesa vs. Magny =

UFC mixed martial arts event in 2021

- The poster for UFC on ESPN: Chiesa vs. Magny
- Promotion: Ultimate Fighting Championship
- Date: January 20, 2021
- Venue: Etihad Arena
- City: Abu Dhabi, United Arab Emirates
- Attendance: 2,000

Event chronology
UFC on ABC: Holloway vs. Kattar	UFC on ESPN: Chiesa vs. Magny	UFC 257: Poirier vs. McGregor 2

UFC on ESPN: Chiesa vs. Magny (also known as UFC on ESPN 20 and UFC Fight Island 8) was a mixed martial arts event produced by the Ultimate Fighting Championship that took place on January 20, 2021, at the Etihad Arena on Yas Island, Abu Dhabi, United Arab Emirates.

== Background ==
Starting with UFC on ABC: Holloway vs. Kattar, a limited number of fans were allowed inside the newly built Etihad Arena, marking the first time since UFC 248 in March 2020 that non-essential event personnel were in attendance. The venue has maximum capacity of over 18,000, but the UFC is expecting to have closer to 2,000 fans for each of the Fight Island's events during the week.

A welterweight bout between Leon Edwards and Khamzat Chimaev was originally expected to headline this event. They were initially scheduled to serve as the headliner for UFC Fight Night: Thompson vs. Neal in December, but the contest was scrapped due to Edwards suffering from severe symptoms of COVID-19. In turn, Chimaev pulled out of the contest on December 29 due to his own COVID-19 recovery. Edwards had hoped to remain on the card against a replacement, but promotion officials intended to leave the pairing intact and reschedule it again for a later date in 2021. As a result, a welterweight bout between The Ultimate Fighter: Live lightweight winner Michael Chiesa and Neil Magny served as the main-event.

A women's flyweight bout between former UFC Women's Flyweight Championship challenger Roxanne Modafferi and Viviane Araújo was briefly linked to an event expected to take place on January 30. However, the fight was rescheduled and took place at this event instead.

Matt Schnell and Tyson Nam met in a flyweight bout at this event. The pairing was previously scheduled to take place in September at UFC Fight Night: Waterson vs. Hill, but the fight was canceled on the day of the event's weigh-in as Schnell was deemed medically unfit to compete due to complications related to his weight cut. They were first rebooked for UFC Fight Night: Thompson vs. Neal, before being moved to this event.

In late December 2020, the UFC opted against holding an event on a planned January 30 date and decided to reschedule several bouts to this card:

- A welterweight bout between former WEC Welterweight Champion and former interim UFC Welterweight Champion Carlos Condit and Matt Brown. Finally, they were moved to UFC on ABC: Holloway vs. Kattar. They were initially scheduled to meet at UFC on Fox: Johnson vs. Benavidez 2 in December 2013, but Brown pulled out due to an undisclosed injury. They were booked once again in April 2018 for UFC on Fox: Poirier vs. Gaethje, but Brown had to pull out a second time as he injured his anterior cruciate ligament.
- A flyweight bout between Jeff Molina and Zarrukh Adashev. They were briefly expected to meet at UFC Fight Night: Felder vs. dos Anjos, but were eventually rescheduled for the scrapped date. Yet again, Molina withdrew from the event at the end of December due to a positive COVID-19 test and was replaced by Su Mudaerji.
- A light heavyweight bout between Vinicius Moreira and Isaac Villanueva.
- A bantamweight rematch featuring Pedro Munhoz and Jimmie Rivera. They previously met at UFC Fight Night: Belfort vs. Henderson 3 in November 2015, when Rivera won via split decision. The pairing was rescheduled once again in early January as they were moved to UFC 258 due to undisclosed reasons.
- A women's flyweight bout between promotional newcomers Victoria Leonardo and Natália Silva. In turn, Silva pulled out due to a fractured ulna and was replaced by fellow newcomer Manon Fiorot.

A welterweight bout between Mike Jackson and Dean Barry was briefly linked to this event. However, the pairing was scrapped due to undisclosed reasons.

Another matchup that was shortly booked was a middleweight fight between Dalcha Lungiambula and Isi Fitikefu. However, Fitikefu was removed due to an elbow injury and replaced by Markus Perez.

A bantamweight bout between promotional newcomers Umar Nurmagomedov and Sergey Morozov was initially scheduled to take place at UFC 254, but Nurmagomedov pulled out due to an illness. The pairing was then rescheduled for UFC 257. However, the bout was yet again rescheduled to take place at this event.

A middleweight bout between Omari Akhmedov and Tom Breese was originally scheduled for UFC on ABC: Holloway vs. Kattar. However, the pairing was rescheduled to take place at this event due to "COVID-19 related issues".

== Results ==
Main card (ESPN / ESPN+)
Weight class				Method	Round	Time	Notes
Welterweight	Michael Chiesa	def.	Neil Magny	Decision (unanimous) (49–46, 49–46, 49–46)	5	5:00
Welterweight	Warlley Alves	def.	Mounir Lazzez	TKO (body kicks and punches)	1	2:35
Light Heavyweight	Ike Villanueva	def.	Vinicius Moreira	KO (punch)	2	0:39
Women's Flyweight	Viviane Araújo	def.	Roxanne Modafferi	Decision (unanimous) (30–27, 30–27, 30–26)	3	5:00
Flyweight	Matt Schnell	def.	Tyson Nam	Decision (split) (29–28, 28–29, 29–28)	3	5:00
Featherweight	Lerone Murphy	def.	Douglas Silva de Andrade	Decision (unanimous) (29–28, 29–28, 30–27)	3	5:00
Middleweight	Omari Akhmedov	def.	Tom Breese	Submission (arm-triangle choke)	2	1:41
Preliminary card (ESPN / ESPN+)
Bantamweight	Ricky Simón	def.	Gaetano Pirrello	Submission (arm-triangle choke)	2	4:00
Flyweight	Su Mudaerji	def.	Zarrukh Adashev	Decision (unanimous) (29–28, 29–28, 30–27)	3	5:00
Middleweight	Dalcha Lungiambula	def.	Markus Perez	Decision (unanimous) (29–28, 29–28, 29–28)	3	5:00
Flyweight	Francisco Figueiredo	def.	Jerome Rivera	Decision (unanimous) (29–28, 29–28, 29–28)	3	5:00
Lightweight	Mike Davis	def.	Mason Jones	Decision (unanimous) (29–28, 29–28, 29–28)	3	5:00
Bantamweight	Umar Nurmagomedov	def.	Sergey Morozov	Technical Submission (rear-naked choke)	2	3:39
Women's Flyweight	Manon Fiorot	def.	Victoria Leonardo	TKO (head kick and punches)	2	4:08

== Bonus awards ==
The following fighters received $50,000 bonuses.

- Fight of the Night: Mike Davis vs. Mason Jones
- Performance of the Night: Warlley Alves and Umar Nurmagomedov

== See also ==
- List of UFC events
- List of current UFC fighters
- 2021 in UFC
