= Jojua =

Jojua (Georgian: ჯოჯუა) is a Georgian surname. Notable people with the surname include:

- Liana Jojua (born 1995), Georgian mixed martial artist
