= UFC on ABC: Holloway vs. Kattar =

UFC mixed martial arts event in 2021

- The poster for UFC on ABC: Holloway vs. Kattar
- Promotion: Ultimate Fighting Championship
- Date: January 16, 2021
- Venue: Etihad Arena
- City: Abu Dhabi, United Arab Emirates
- Attendance: 2,000

Event chronology
UFC Fight Night: Thompson vs. Neal	UFC on ABC: Holloway vs. Kattar	UFC on ESPN: Chiesa vs. Magny

UFC on ABC: Holloway vs. Kattar (also known as UFC on ABC 1 and UFC Fight Island 7) was a mixed martial arts event produced by the Ultimate Fighting Championship that took place on January 16, 2021, at the Etihad Arena on Yas Island, Abu Dhabi, United Arab Emirates.

== Background ==
The main card marked the first time a mixed martial arts event was broadcast on ABC. It also meant the UFC's first return to network television since UFC on Fox: Lee vs. Iaquinta 2 was broadcast on Fox in December 2018.

After hosting nine events behind closed doors at the du Forum amid the COVID-19 pandemic, the UFC made its debut at the newly built Etihad Arena. A limited number of fans were allowed inside the venue, marking the first time since UFC 248 in March 2020 that non-essential event personnel were in attendance. The venue has maximum capacity of over 18,000, but the UFC is expecting to have closer to 2,000 fans for each of the Fight Island's events during the week.

A featherweight bout between former UFC Featherweight Champion Max Holloway and Calvin Kattar served as the event headliner.

A bantamweight bout between Ricky Simon and Brian Kelleher was initially scheduled to take place at UFC Fight Night: Overeem vs. Sakai, but Simon's cornerman tested positive for COVID-19 and he was forced to withdraw from the event. The pairing was then rescheduled for this event. In turn, Kelleher also tested positive on January 1 and was pulled from the bout. He was replaced by newcomer Gaetano Pirrello and the bout took place four days later at UFC on ESPN: Chiesa vs. Magny.

A women's bantamweight bout between former UFC Women's Bantamweight Championship challenger Bethe Correia and Wu Yanan was expected to take place at UFC on ESPN: Hermansson vs. Vettori. However, due to visa issues, they were rescheduled for this event. In turn, Correia had to pull out on January 5 due to appendicitis, which required an appendectomy. She was replaced by promotional newcomer Joselyne Edwards.

Muslim Salikhov was scheduled to face Santiago Ponzinibbio in a welterweight bout at the event. However, Salikhov pulled out of the bout in mid-December citing health issues after contracting COVID-19. He was replaced by Li Jingliang.

A flyweight bout between former UFC Flyweight Championship challenger Tim Elliott (also The Ultimate Fighter: Tournament of Champions flyweight winner) and Jordan Espinosa was expected to take place at this event. However, Espinosa tested positive for COVID-19 in late December and the pairing was moved to UFC 259.

A women's bantamweight bout between The Ultimate Fighter: Team Rousey vs. Team Tate bantamweight winner Julianna Peña and former title challenger Sara McMann (also 2004 Olympic silver medalist in wrestling) was originally scheduled for this event before being pushed back a week later to UFC 257.

The Ultimate Fighter: Brazil 3 middleweight winner Warlley Alves and Christian Aguilera were expected to meet in a welterweight bout. However, Aguilera pulled out in late December due to an injury. He was replaced by Mounir Lazzez and the pairing took place at UFC on ESPN: Chiesa vs. Magny.

A middleweight bout between five-time Brazilian jiu-jitsu World Champion Rodolfo Vieira and Anthony Hernandez was expected to take place at this event. However, Hernandez pulled out due to a positive COVID-19 test and they were rescheduled for UFC 258.

A welterweight bout between former WEC Welterweight Champion and former interim UFC Welterweight Champion Carlos Condit and Matt Brown was originally booked for a planned January 30 event. After the UFC opted against holding a card on that date, they were then briefly rescheduled for UFC on ESPN: Chiesa vs. Magny. At last, they were booked for this event. The pairing has been previously cancelled as they were initially scheduled to meet at UFC on Fox: Johnson vs. Benavidez 2 in December 2013, but Brown pulled out due to an undisclosed injury. They were booked once again in April 2018 for UFC on Fox: Poirier vs. Gaethje, but Brown had to pull out a second time as he injured his anterior cruciate ligament.

Sarah Moras was initially scheduled to face Vanessa Melo in a bantamweight bout at UFC on ESPN: Santos vs. Teixeira in November 2020, but it was eventually postponed to take place at this event due to Moras contracting COVID-19.

A featherweight bout between Nik Lentz and Mike Grundy was scheduled for this event. However, a member of Grundy's team tested positive for COVID-19, hence Lentz was given a new opponent off Movsar Evloev who he will face at UFC 257 in a catchweight bout of 150 pounds.

During fight week, the UFC opted to move a middleweight bout between Omari Akhmedov and Tom Breese to UFC on ESPN: Chiesa vs. Magny due to "COVID-19 related issues".

A few hours before the event, a middleweight bout between Phil Hawes and Nassourdine Imavov was scrapped due to undisclosed reasons.

After defending his UFC Lightweight Championship at UFC 254 in October, Khabib Nurmagomedov immediately announced his retirement, citing his father's death from complications related to COVID-19 in last July as the main reason behind it. Despite his announcement, the title was never officially vacated as UFC President Dana White said several times that he believed Nurmagomedov would still fight again. A meeting between both of them to discuss the champion's future was then expected to happen this week during the organization's stint at Fight Island, eventually taking place on January 15. The following day, White made an appearance live on ABC during the main card of this event and revealed the outcome of the meeting: the Russian left the door open to a potential return, depending on how the main and co-main event lightweights perform at UFC 257, while also praising Charles Oliveira's performance at UFC 256.

== Results ==
Main card (ABC / ESPN+)
Weight class				Method	Round	Time	Notes
Featherweight	Max Holloway	def.	Calvin Kattar	Decision (unanimous) (50–43, 50–43, 50–42)	5	5:00
Welterweight	Carlos Condit	def.	Matt Brown	Decision (unanimous) (30–27, 30–27, 30–27)	3	5:00
Welterweight	Li Jingliang	def.	Santiago Ponzinibbio	KO (punch)	1	4:25
Middleweight	Alessio Di Chirico	def.	Joaquin Buckley	KO (head kick)	1	2:12
Middleweight	Punahele Soriano	def.	Duško Todorović	TKO (punches)	1	4:48
Preliminary card (ESPN+)
Women's Bantamweight	Joselyne Edwards	def.	Wu Yanan	Decision (unanimous) (30–27, 30–27, 29–28)	3	5:00
Heavyweight	Carlos Felipe	def.	Justin Tafa	Decision (split) (29–28, 28–29, 29–28)	3	5:00
Welterweight	Ramazan Emeev	def.	David Zawada	Decision (split) (29–28, 28–29, 29–28)	3	5:00
Women's Bantamweight	Vanessa Melo	def.	Sarah Moras	Decision (unanimous) (30–27, 29–28, 29–28)	3	5:00
Featherweight	Austin Lingo	def.	Jacob Kilburn	Decision (unanimous) (30–26, 30–26, 30–27)	3	5:00

== Bonus awards ==
The following fighters received $50,000 bonuses.

- Fight of the Night: Max Holloway vs. Calvin Kattar
- Performance of the Night: Li Jingliang and Alessio Di Chirico

== See also ==
- List of UFC events
- List of current UFC fighters
- 2021 in UFC
