= Etihad Arena =

Multi-purpose indoor arena located on Yas Island in Abu Dhabi

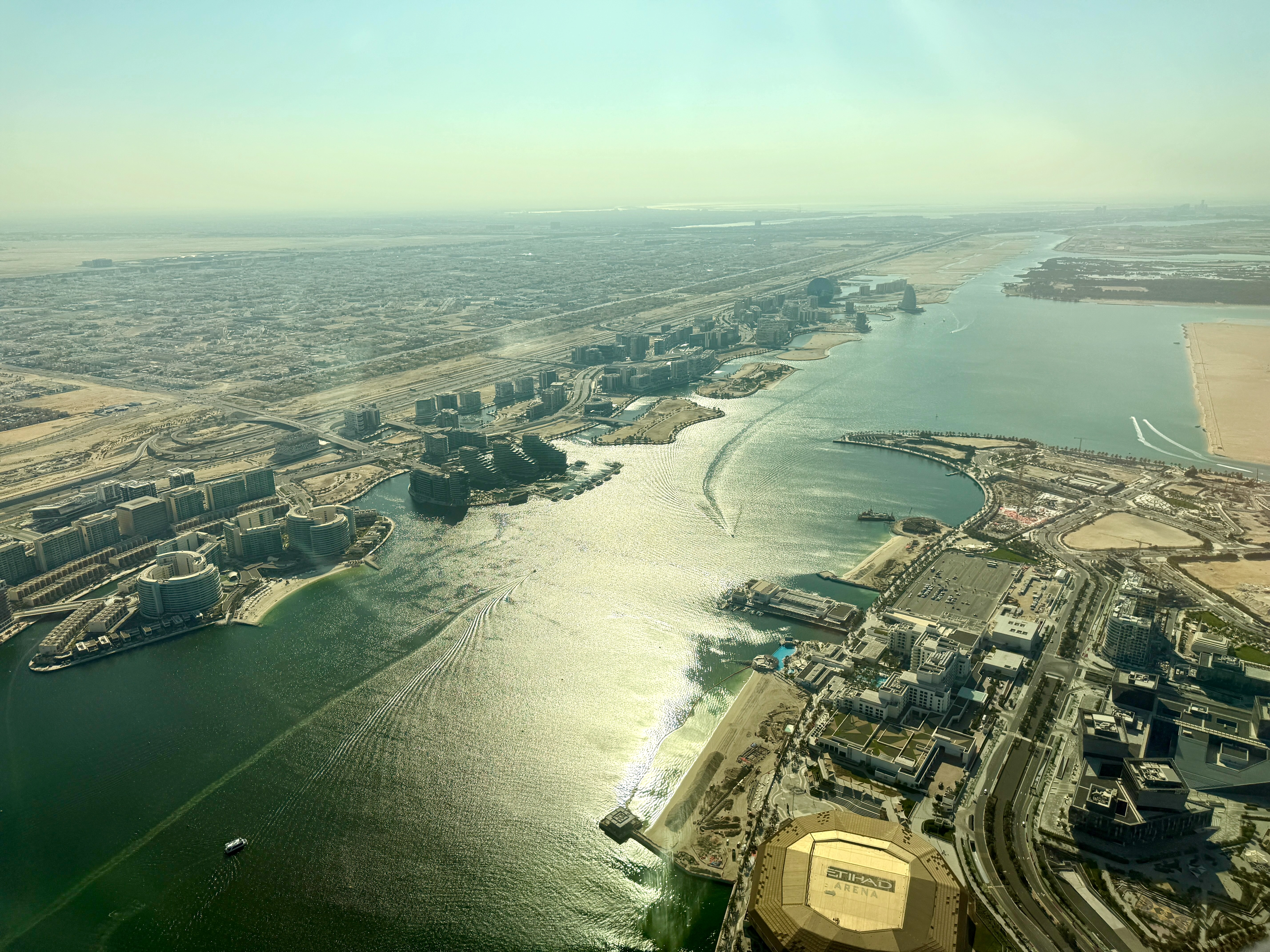
- Yas Bay Waterfront on Yas Island, near Etihad Arena
- Interactive map of Etihad Arena
- Address: FJ63+4PQ - درب يَاس - Yas Island - YS2 - Abu Dhabi, Phone: 600 511115
- Location: Yas Island, Abu Dhabi, United Arab Emirates
- Coordinates: 24.4603°N 54.6040°E
- Owner: Miral
- Operator: Ethara
- Capacity: 18,000

Construction
- Opened: January 2021
- Architect: HOK

Website
- Official website

Etihad Arena (initially known as Yas Bay Arena while under construction) is an indoor arena in Abu Dhabi, United Arab Emirates, located on the Yas Bay Waterfront district of Yas Island. Designed by HOK, the capacity of the venue is 18,000.

== History ==
In 2018, its design received the 2018 MENA Green Building Award for "Sustainable Building Design of the Year".

In January 2020, naming rights for the new arena were sold to Etihad Airways.

Originally expected to open in March 2020, its opening was delayed due to event cancellations tied to the COVID-19 pandemic in the United Arab Emirates, eventually opening in 2021.

=== Sporting events ===
The UFC had held mixed martial arts events on Yas Island behind closed doors in a bubble arrangement known as "Fight Island"; this marked the UFC's first event in the series to have spectators at a limited capacity. The arena's first event was UFC on ABC: Holloway vs. Kattar. The arena held its second UFC event days later, hosting UFC on ESPN: Chiesa vs. Magny. The promotion held its first pay-per-view event that same month, hosting UFC 257: Poirier vs. McGregor 2. The UFC returned to Etihad Arena for UFC 267: Błachowicz vs. Teixeira in October 2021. The promotion returned to the arena in 2022 for their annual October pay-per-view event, hosting UFC 280: Oliveira vs. Makhachev. In October of 2023 UFC 294: Makhachev vs. Volkanovski 2 was held as their annual event. In 2024, two UFC events where held at the arena with UFC on ABC: Sandhagen vs. Nurmagomedov in August and UFC 308: Topuria vs. Holloway in October. The promotion returned to the arena in 2025 for UFC on ABC: Whittaker vs. de Ridder. and UFC 321: Aspinall vs. Gane. In 2026 the UFC returned for UFC Fight Night: Ankalaev vs. Guskov in July and UFC 333: Volkanovski vs. Evloev in October.

For hosting the 2021 World Swimming Championships in December 2021, a temporary pool was added to the arena.

On 21 May 2022, the arena hosted an exhibition boxing match between Floyd Mayweather Jr. and Don Moore. On November 5, 2022, a WBA light heavyweight title fight was held between Dmitry Bivol and Gilberto Ramírez.

In October 2022, the arena held two NBA preseason games between the Atlanta Hawks and the Milwaukee Bucks. The NBA Abu Dhabi Games 2022 marked the league's first games held in the UAE and the Persian Gulf. In October 2023, the NBA returned to the arena for two preseason games between the Dallas Mavericks and the Minnesota Timberwolves. In October 2024, the NBA returned to the arena for two preseason games between the Boston Celtics and the Denver Nuggets. The league faced criticism from human rights groups, which claimed the event was assisting repressive regimes in sportswashing their human rights records. Human Rights Watch urged the NBA to undertake measures to address the UAE's rights records. The game was also attended by U.S. ambassador Martina A. Strong, who was questioned for supporting the NBA's association with the UAE, despite human rights concerns. Instead, Strong commended the NBA for expanding global access to basketball.

=== Concerts ===
On 26 January 2023, the arena held Imagine Dragon's Mercury World Tour. It was the band's first concert in the city of Abu Dhabi.

Guns N' Roses performed on June 1, 2023, many old songs were played for the first time in a long time (Anything Goes, Pretty Tied Up and Bad Obsession, Down on the Farm).

On January 20, 2026, Linkin Park will play a show as part of the world tour promoting their comeback album, From Zero.

== Other events ==
- 22nd IIFA Awards
- Disney on Ice
- Mercury World Tour
- 23rd IIFA Awards
- DNA World Tour
- UFC 333
- The Lion King
- 24th IIFA Awards
- Westlife: The Wild Dreams Tour
- Guns N' Roses 2023 Tour
- Up All Night: Live in 2025
- NBA Abu Dhabi Games 2025
- 2025 Turkish Airlines EuroLeague Final Four
- CHRISTINA AGUILERA
- 2026 EuroLeague SuperCup
- RAF Abu Dhabi: Chimaev vs. Covington
