= Sergey Morozov (fighter) =

Kazakhstani mixed martial arts fighter

- Born: June 14, 1989 (age 37); Aktobe, Kazakh SSR, Soviet Union
- Nationality: Kazakhstani
- Height: 5 ft 5 in (1.65 m)
- Weight: 135 lb (61 kg; 9 st 9 lb)
- Division: Bantamweight
- Reach: 67 in (170 cm)
- Fighting out of: Aktobe, Kazakhstan
- Team: Erkin Kush
- Years active: 2008–2022

Mixed martial arts record
- Total: 24
- Wins: 19
- By knockout: 8
- By submission: 3
- By decision: 8
- Losses: 5
- By knockout: 1
- By submission: 3
- By decision: 1

Other information
- Mixed martial arts record from Sherdog

Sergey Morozov (Russian: Сергей Морозов; born June 14, 1989) is a Kazakhstani former mixed martial artist who competed in the Bantamweight division of the Ultimate Fighting Championship. Morozov is the former M-1 Bantamweight Champion.

== Background ==
Having played football since the age of seven years old, he enrolled in the Youth Sports School, studied there, played until the age of 17. Then, at the age of 17, he joined the Aktobe-Zhas team, which played in the First League. He played there for two seasons, before leaving because of character issues.

In December 2021, Morozov converted to Islam.

== Mixed martial arts career ==
=== Early career ===
Starting his professional career in 2008, Morozov compiled a 16-4 record, spending most of his time on the Russian regional scene, with most off his bouts coming with M-1 Global Challenge, where he spent five years and is the former M-1 Bantamweight Champion. In his attempt for the championship against Movsar Evloev on February 22, 2018 at M-1 Challenge 88, losing by rear-naked choke in the third round. After winning the next three bouts, he captured the championship against Aleksandr Osetrov at M-1 Challenge 102, winning by TKO in the third round. He defended the title against Josh Rettinghouse at M-1 Challenge 105, winning the bout via unanimous decision.

=== Ultimate Fighting Championship ===
Morozov was initially scheduled to face Umar Nurmagomedov on October 24, 2020 at UFC 254, but Nurmagomedov pulled out due to an illness. The pairing was then rescheduled for UFC 257 on January 24, 2021. However, the bout was yet again rescheduled the second time on January 20, 2021 at UFC on ESPN: Chiesa vs. Magny. Morozov lost the fight via fight via submission in round two.

His second fight in UFC was scheduled on July 17, 2021, facing Khalid Taha at UFC on ESPN 26. He won the fight via unanimous decision.

Morozov faced Douglas Silva de Andrade on February 12, 2022 at UFC 271. After dominating the first round, Morozov was choked unconscious via a rear-naked choke submission in the second round. The bout earned the Fight of the Night bonus award.

Morozov faced Raulian Paiva on June 25, 2022, at UFC on ESPN 38. He won the fight via unanimous decision.

Morozov faced Journey Newson on December 17, 2022 at UFC Fight Night 216. He won the fight via unanimous decision.

In March 2023, Morozov's manager announced that the fighter had retired from competition.

== Championships and accomplishments ==
- Ultimate Fighting Championship
  - Fight of the Night (One time) vs. Douglas Silva de Andrade
- M-1 Global
  - M-1 Bantamweight Championship (One time)
    - One successful title defense
- MMAjunkie.com
  - 2022 February Fight of the Month vs. Douglas Silva de Andrade

== Mixed martial arts record ==
Professional record breakdown
| 24 matches | 19 wins | 5 losses |
| By knockout | 8 | 1 |
| By submission | 3 | 3 |
| By decision | 8 | 1 |

| Res. | Record | Opponent | Method | Event | Date | Round | Time | Location | Notes |
|---|---|---|---|---|---|---|---|---|---|
| Win | 19–5 | Journey Newson | Decision (unanimous) | UFC Fight Night: Cannonier vs. Strickland | December 17, 2022 | 3 | 5:00 | Las Vegas, Nevada, United States | |
| Win | 18–5 | Raulian Paiva | Decision (unanimous) | UFC on ESPN: Tsarukyan vs. Gamrot | June 25, 2022 | 3 | 5:00 | Las Vegas, Nevada, United States | |
| Loss | 17–5 | Douglas Silva de Andrade | Technical Submission (rear-naked choke) | UFC 271 | February 12, 2022 | 2 | 3:24 | Houston, Texas, United States | Fight of the Night. |
| Win | 17–4 | Khalid Taha | Decision (unanimous) | UFC on ESPN: Makhachev vs. Moisés | July 17, 2021 | 3 | 5:00 | Las Vegas, Nevada, United States | |
| Loss | 16–4 | Umar Nurmagomedov | Technical Submission (rear-naked choke) | UFC on ESPN: Magny vs. Chiesa | January 20, 2021 | 2 | 3:39 | Abu Dhabi, United Arab Emirates | |
| Win | 16–3 | Josh Rettinghouse | Decision (unanimous) | M-1 Challenge 105 | October 19, 2019 | 5 | 5:00 | Nur-Sultan, Kazakhstan | Defended the M-1 Global Bantamweight Championship. |
| Win | 15–3 | Aleksandr Osetrov | TKO (punches) | M-1 Challenge 102 | June 28, 2019 | 4 | 1:40 | Astana, Kazakhstan | Won the vacant M-1 Global Bantamweight Championship. |
| Win | 14–3 | Bakhytbek Duyshobay Uulu | KO (punches) | M-1 Challenge 100 | December 15, 2018 | 1 | 4:15 | Atyrau, Kazakhstan | |
| Win | 13–3 | Bair Shtepin | Decision (unanimous) | M-1 Challenge 98 | November 2, 2018 | 3 | 5:00 | Chelyabinsk, Russia | |
| Win | 12–3 | Zaka Fatullazade | TKO (punches) | M-1 Challenge 95 | July 21, 2018 | 1 | 4:31 | Nazran, Russia | |
| Loss | 11–3 | Movsar Evloev | Technical Submission (rear-naked choke) | M-1 Challenge 88 | February 22, 2018 | 3 | 3:47 | Moscow, Russia | For the M-1 Global Bantamweight Championship. |
| Win | 11–2 | Luan Fernandes | TKO (punches) | M-1 Challenge 83 | September 24, 2017 | 2 | 4:48 | Kazan, Russia | |
| Win | 10–2 | Fabricio Sarraff | Decision (unanimous) | M-1 Challenge 76 | April 22, 2017 | 3 | 5:00 | Nalchik, Russia | |
| Loss | 9–2 | Josh Rettinghouse | KO (punches) | M-1 Challenge 73 | December 9, 2016 | 1 | 4:22 | Nazran, Russia | |
| Win | 9–1 | Yoon Jin Lee | Decision (unanimous) | KZMMAF: Battle of Nomads 9 | August 8, 2016 | 3 | 5:00 | Hwasun, South Korea | |
| Win | 8–1 | Rafael Dias | Decision (unanimous) | M-1 Challenge 69 | July 16, 2016 | 3 | 5:00 | Targim, Russia | |
| Loss | 7–1 | Pavel Vitruk | Decision (unanimous) | M-1 Challenge 64 | February 19, 2016 | 3 | 5:00 | Moscow, Russia | |
| Win | 7–0 | Andy Young | TKO (spinning backfist and punches) | M-1 Challenge 59 | July 3, 2015 | 2 | 3:50 | Astana, Kazakhstan | Return to Bantamweight. |
| Win | 6–0 | Zafar Salimov | Submission (rear-naked choke) | KZMMAF: Battle of Nomads 4 | May 24, 2015 | 1 | N/A | Khujand, Tajikistan | |
| Win | 5–0 | Bogar Klos | TKO (punches) | KZMMAF: Battle of Nomads 3 | April 11, 2015 | 1 | 3:44 | Oral, Kazakhstan | |
| Win | 4–0 | Andranik Karapetyan | Submission (rear-naked choke) | Professional Combat Samb: Eurasian Economic Union | February 21, 2015 | 1 | 1:52 | Omsk, Russia | Featherweight debut. |
| Win | 3–0 | Rijirigala Amu | TKO (knee and punches) | M-1 Challenge 53 | November 25, 2014 | 2 | 4:40 | Beijing, China | |
| Win | 2–0 | Mirat Bekishev | KO (punches) | Astana Fight Club 2 | October 20, 2012 | 2 | N/A | Astana, Kazakhstan | |
| Win | 1–0 | Andrey Mikhailov | Submission | Profi Mix Fight Championship 2 | February 22, 2008 | 1 | N/A | Nizhny Novgorod, Russia | Bantamweight debut. |

== See also ==
- List of male mixed martial artists
