= UFC 242 =

UFC mixed martial arts event in 2019

UFC 242: Khabib vs. Poirier
- The poster for UFC 242: Khabib vs. Poirier
- Promotion: Ultimate Fighting Championship
- Date: September 7, 2019
- Venue: The Arena, Yas Island
- City: Abu Dhabi, United Arab Emirates
- Buyrate: 1,000,000

Event chronology
UFC Fight Night: Andrade vs. Zhang	UFC 242: Khabib vs. Poirier	UFC Fight Night: Cowboy vs. Gaethje

UFC 242: Khabib vs. Poirier was a mixed martial arts pay-per-view event produced by the Ultimate Fighting Championship that was held on September 7, 2019 at The Arena, Yas Island in Abu Dhabi, United Arab Emirates.

== Background ==
The event marked the promotion's third visit to Abu Dhabi and first since UFC Fight Night: Nogueira vs. Nelson in April 2014.

A UFC Lightweight Championship title unification bout between current champion Khabib Nurmagomedov and interim champion Dustin Poirier served as the event's headliner.

A lightweight bout between Magomed Mustafaev and Don Madge was scheduled for the event. However, on August 18, it was reported that Mustafaev was removed from the bout for undisclosed reasons. Madge then faced promotional newcomer Farès Ziam.

Adam Yandiev was scheduled to face promotional newcomer Punahele Soriano at the event. However, Yandiev pulled out of the bout in mid-August citing a knee injury and the bout was scrapped.

A bantamweight bout between Khalid Taha and Bruno Gustavo da Silva was scheduled for the event. However, on August 21, it was reported that the bout was moved to UFC 243.

At the weigh-ins, Sarah Moras weighed in at 138 pounds, 2 pounds over the bantamweight non-title fight limit of 136. She was fined 20% of her purse and her bout with Liana Jojua proceeded at a catchweight.

== Results ==
Main Card
Weight class				Method	Round	Time	Notes
Lightweight	Khabib Nurmagomedov (c)	def.	Dustin Poirier (ic)	Submission (rear-naked choke)	3	2:06	(Note: For the UFC Lightweight Championship.)
Lightweight	Paul Felder	def.	Edson Barboza	Decision (split) (27–30, 29–28, 30–27)	3	5:00
Lightweight	Islam Makhachev	def.	Davi Ramos	Decision (unanimous) (29–27, 30–26, 30–26)	3	5:00
Heavyweight	Curtis Blaydes	def.	Shamil Abdurakhimov	TKO (elbow and punches)	2	2:22
Lightweight	Carlos Diego Ferreira	def.	Mairbek Taisumov	Decision (unanimous) (29–28, 29–27, 29–27)	3	5:00
Preliminary Card (FX/ESPN+)
Women's Flyweight	Joanne Calderwood	def.	Andrea Lee	Decision (split) (28–29, 30–27, 29–28)	3	5:00
Featherweight	Zubaira Tukhugov	vs.	Lerone Murphy	Draw (split) (28–29, 29–28, 28–28)	3	5:00
Catchweight (138 lb)	Sarah Moras	def.	Liana Jojua	TKO (punches and elbows)	3	2:26
Lightweight	Ottman Azaitar	def.	Teemu Packalén	KO (punch)	1	3:33
Early Preliminary Card (UFC Fight Pass)
Welterweight	Belal Muhammad	def.	Takashi Sato	Submission (rear-naked choke)	3	1:55
Welterweight	Muslim Salikhov	def.	Nordine Taleb	KO (punch)	1	4:26
Middleweight	Omari Akhmedov	def.	Zak Cummings	Decision (unanimous) (30–27, 30–27, 29–28)	3	5:00
Lightweight	Don Madge	def.	Farès Ziam	Decision (unanimous) (30–27, 30–27, 29–28)	3	5:00

== Bonus awards ==
The following fighters received $50,000 bonuses.

- Fight of the Night: No bonus awarded.
- Performance of the Night: Khabib Nurmagomedov, Ottman Azaitar, Belal Muhammad and Muslim Salikhov

== Viewership ==
As of September 4, 2019 online promotional content related to UFC 242, uploaded to online streaming platforms including YouTube, Facebook and Instagram prior to the fight, has received a collective total of more than 112 million views.

In Russia, where it was broadcast by the free TV station Channel One Russia, the fight drew approximately 26 million viewers, equivalent to 24% of Russia's adult population.

== See also ==
- List of UFC events
- 2019 in UFC
- List of current UFC fighters
