= Liana Jojua =

Georgian mixed martial arts fighter

- Born: March 22, 1995 (age 31); Tbilisi, Georgia
- Other names: She Wolf
- Height: 5 ft 4 in (1.63 m)
- Weight: 129 lb (59 kg; 9 st 3 lb)
- Division: Flyweight; Bantamweight
- Reach: 62 in (157 cm)
- Style: Muay Thai, Wrestling, Kudo
- Stance: Orthodox
- Fighting out of: Grozny, Russia
- Team: Akhmat Fighting Club; Syndicate MMA (2021–present)
- Years active: 2015–present

Mixed martial arts record
- Total: 14
- Wins: 8
- By knockout: 2
- By submission: 5
- By decision: 1
- Losses: 6
- By knockout: 2
- By submission: 1
- By decision: 3

Other information
- Mixed martial arts record from Sherdog

Liana Jojua (born March 22, 1995) is a Georgian mixed martial artist who competes in the flyweight and bantamweight divisions. She has formerly fought in the Ultimate Fighting Championship (UFC), and she was also the inaugural and former Fight Nights Global Women's Bantamweight Champion.

== Mixed martial arts career ==
=== Early career ===
Jojua's interest in MMA started after watching Gina Carano's fights as a 16-year-old. Coming from a background in Muay Thai, she made her MMA debut in September 2015. After winning her initial fight, she went on a two-fight skid in 2016, but Jojua hit her stride and went on a five-fight win streak which culminated in her winning the FNG Women's Bantamweight Championship against Marina Mokhnatkina.

=== Ultimate Fighting Championship ===
Jojua faced Sarah Moras on September 7, 2019, at UFC 242. At the weigh-ins, Moras weighed in at 138 lbs, 2 pounds over the bantamweight non-title fight limit of 136 lbs. Moras was fined 20% of her fight purse to Jojua, and the bout proceeded at catchweight. Jojua lost the fight via TKO in the third round.

==== Move down to flyweight ====
Jojua faced Diana Belbiţă at UFC on ESPN: Kattar vs. Ige on July 16, 2020. She won the fight via armbar in first round.

Jojua faced Miranda Maverick on October 24, 2020 at UFC 254. She lost the fight via technical knockout in round one.

Jojua was expected to face Cortney Casey on August 21, 2021, at UFC on ESPN 29. However, Jojua was forced out of the fight due to visa issues. The matchup was rescheduled at UFC Fight Night 197 on November 13, 2021. At the weigh-ins, Jojua weighed in at 128.5 pounds, two and a half pounds over the flyweight non-title fight limit. The bout proceeded at a catchweight with Jojua fined 30% of her purse, which went to her opponent Casey. Jojua lost the bout via unanimous decision.

After the loss, it was announced that Jojua was released from UFC.

=== Post UFC ===
Jojua made her first appearance post UFC release and faced Dariya Zheleznyakova on May 20, 2022 at Ares FC 6. She lost by the way of unanimous decision.

== Personal life ==
She is a teacher and graduated from Moscow State Pedagogical University. She also has a secondary musical education in vocals and piano.

== Championships and accomplishments ==
- Fight Nights Global
  - FNG Women's Bantamweight Championship (One time; inaugural)

== Mixed martial arts record ==
Professional record breakdown
14 matches	8 wins	6 losses
By knockout	2	2
By submission	5	1
By decision	1	3

Res.	Record	Opponent	Method	Event	Date	Round	Time	Location	Notes
Win	8–6	Jaqueline Ferreira	TKO (punches)	GFC 29	December 14, 2024	1	2:24	Tbilisi, Georgia	
Loss	7–6	Dariya Zheleznyakova	Decision (unanimous)	Ares FC 6	May 20, 2022	3	5:00	Paris, France	Return to Bantamweight.
Loss	7–5	Cortney Casey	Decision (unanimous)	UFC Fight Night: Holloway vs. Rodríguez	November 13, 2021	3	5:00	Las Vegas, Nevada, United States	Catchweight (128.5 lb) bout; Jojua missed weight.
Loss	7–4	Miranda Maverick	TKO (doctor stoppage)	UFC 254	October 24, 2020	1	5:00	Abu Dhabi, United Arab Emirates	
Win	7–3	Diana Belbiţă	Submission (armbar)	UFC on ESPN: Kattar vs. Ige	July 16, 2020	1	2:47	Abu Dhabi, United Arab Emirates	Flyweight debut.
Loss	6–3	Sarah Moras	TKO (punches)	UFC 242	September 7, 2019	3	2:26	Abu Dhabi, United Arab Emirates	Catchweight (138 lb) bout; Moras missed weight.
Win	6–2	Marina Mokhnatkina	Decision (majority)	Fight Nights Global 83: Alibekov vs. Aliev	February 22, 2018	5	5:00	Moscow, Russia	Won the inaugural FNG Women's Bantamweight Championship.
Win	5–2	Viktoriya Shalimova	Submission (heel hook)	Emir FC: Selection 1	December 29, 2017	1	0:28	Moscow, Russia	
Win	4–2	Karina Vasilenko	Submission (armbar)	Fight Nights Global 71: Mineev vs. Michailidis	July 29, 2017	1	4:15	Moscow, Russia	
Win	3–2	Tao Li	Submission (armbar)	Kunlun Fight MMA 7	December 15, 2016	1	3:14	Beijing, China	Return to Bantamweight.
Win	2–2	Valeria Pak	Submission (armbar)	SLMMA 7: Ivanov vs. Karapetyan	November 6, 2016	2	N/A	Moscow, Russia	Featherweight debut.
Loss	1–2	Liang Na	Submission (rear-naked choke)	WLF E.P.I.C. 7	August 20, 2016	2	N/A	Zhengzhou, China	
Loss	1–1	Zamzagul Fayzallanova	Decision (split)	Alash Pride: Atyrau the Beautiful	January 16, 2016	3	5:00	Atyrau, Kazakhstan	Catchweight (143 lb)
Win	1–0	Tatyana Pevneva	TKO (punches)	Octagon Fighting Sensation 5	October 3, 2015	1	3:07	Yaroslavl, Russia	Catchweight (137 lb)

== See also ==
- List of female mixed martial artists
