= UFC 254 =

UFC mixed martial arts event in 2020

UFC 254: Khabib vs. Gaethje
- The poster for UFC 254: Khabib vs. Gaethje
- Promotion: Ultimate Fighting Championship
- Date: October 24, 2020
- Venue: du Forum
- City: Abu Dhabi, United Arab Emirates
- Attendance: None (behind closed doors)
- Buyrate: 675,000

Event chronology
UFC Fight Night: Ortega vs. The Korean Zombie	UFC 254: Khabib vs. Gaethje	UFC Fight Night: Hall vs. Silva

UFC 254: Khabib vs. Gaethje was a mixed martial arts event produced by the Ultimate Fighting Championship that took place on October 24, 2020 at the du Forum on Yas Island, Abu Dhabi, United Arab Emirates.

== Background ==
The event proceeded with local timing for prime time hours. The main card began at 10:00 pm (October 24) local time in Abu Dhabi, with a full preliminary card beginning at approximately 6:15 pm Gulf Standard Time.

A UFC Lightweight Championship unification bout between current champion Khabib Nurmagomedov and interim champion Justin Gaethje (also former WSOF Lightweight Champion) served as the event headliner. The bout was briefly linked to UFC 253, but the date did not materialize and instead took place four weeks later. On September 17, the UFC announced the signing of former three-time Bellator Lightweight World Champion Michael Chandler, who served as backup and a potential replacement for this fight.

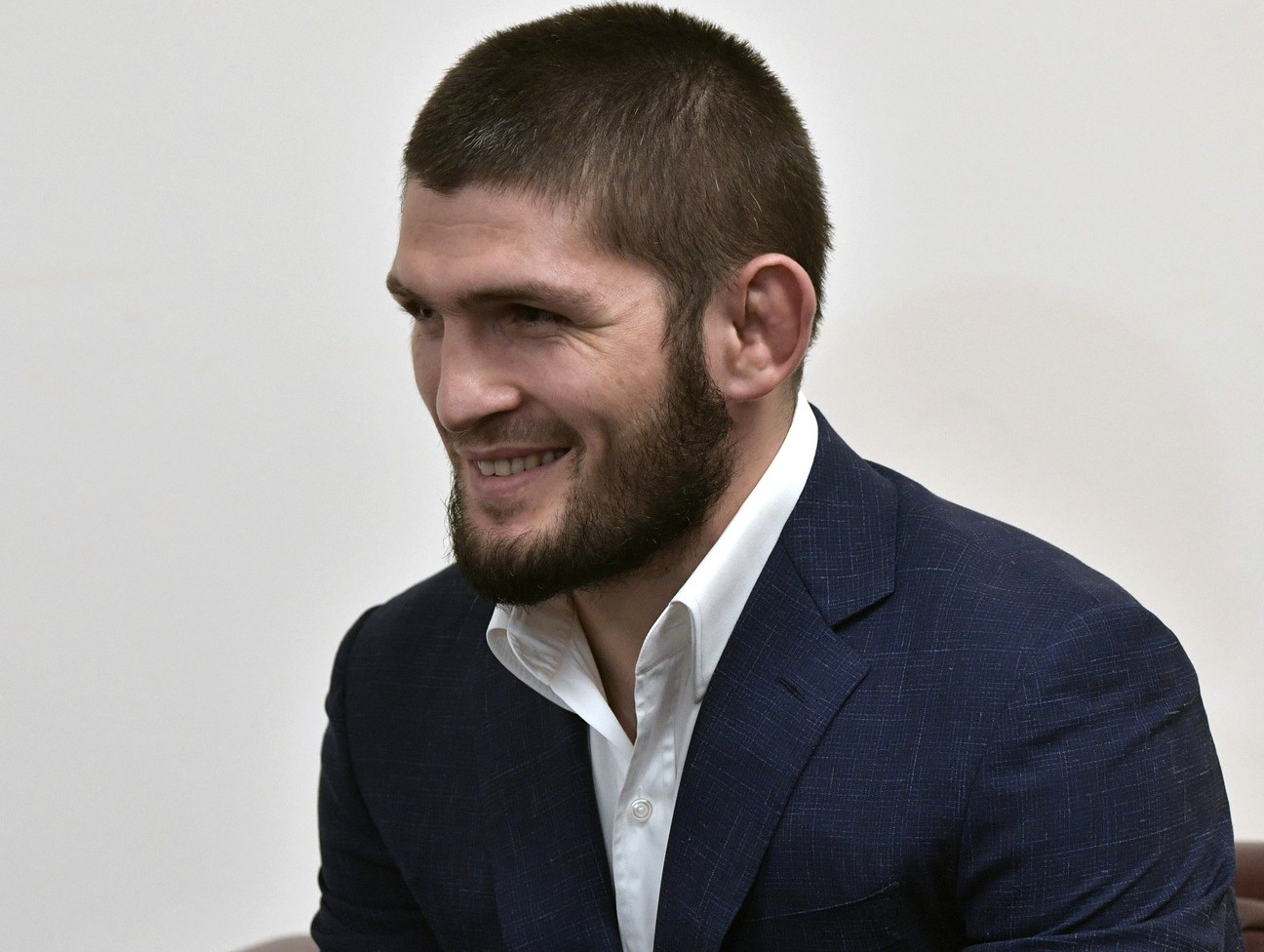
Khabib Nurmagomedov held a perfect 28–0 record leading into the event.

A middleweight bout between former UFC Middleweight Champion Robert Whittaker and Jared Cannonier was initially scheduled to take place at UFC 248 in March. However, Whittaker pulled out for personal reasons. The pairing was rescheduled for this event.

Despite never being officially announced, a featherweight bout between The Ultimate Fighter: Latin America featherweight winner Yair Rodríguez and Zabit Magomedsharipov was expected to take place at the event. The pairing had been scheduled on two previous occasions, first at UFC 228 in September 2018 and then at UFC Fight Night: Smith vs. Rakić in August. However, Rodríguez pulled out of both events with injury.

Magomed Ankalaev and Ion Cuțelaba first met in a light heavyweight bout at UFC Fight Night: Benavidez vs. Figueiredo, where Ankalaev won via controversial knockout. Due to the controversy of the stoppage, the UFC booked the rematch for UFC 249, on its original April 18 date. However, Ankalaev was forced to pull out of the event due to travel restrictions related to the COVID-19 pandemic. They were later rebooked for UFC 252, but Cuțelaba then pulled out after testing positive for COVID-19 and the bout was rescheduled for UFC Fight Night: Smith vs. Rakić. Cuțelaba tested positive yet again on the day of the event, resulting in another cancellation of this fight. In turn, they were rescheduled for a third time and met at this event. Promotional newcomer Isi Fitikefu weighed in as an alternate for this bout.

Elizeu Zaleski dos Santos was expected to face Shavkat Rakhmonov in a welterweight bout at the event. However, dos Santos pulled out in late September due to a knee injury that would require surgery. He was replaced by Alex Oliveira.

A lightweight bout between former champion Rafael dos Anjos and Islam Makhachev was expected to take place at the event. However, it was announced on October 8 that dos Anjos tested positive for COVID-19 and was pulled from the bout. A replacement could not be found and Makhachev was also removed from the event. The pairing was left intact and rescheduled for November 14 at UFC Fight Night: Felder vs. dos Anjos.

Cynthia Calvillo and former Invicta FC Bantamweight Champion Lauren Murphy were scheduled to meet in a women's flyweight bout at the event. However, Calvillo withdrew from the bout on October 15 after testing positive for COVID-19 and was replaced by promotional newcomer Liliya Shakirova.

A bantamweight bout between Umar Nurmagomedov and Sergey Morozov was expected to take place at the event. However, it was announced on October 18 that Nurmagomedov had been hospitalized due to an illness and the bout was scrapped. Morozov remained as an alternate for the catchweight bout of 140 pounds between Nathaniel Wood and Casey Kenney.

At the weigh-ins, Alex Oliveira and Joel Álvarez missed weight for their respective bouts. Oliveira weighed in at 173 pounds, two pounds over the welterweight non-title fight limit. Álvarez weighed in at 159.5 pounds, three and a half pounds over the lightweight non-title fight limit. Both of their bouts proceeded at catchweight and they were each fined 20% and 30% of their individual purses respectively, which went to their opponents Shavkat Rakhmonov and Alexander Yakovlev.

== Results ==
Main card
Weight class				Method	Round	Time	Notes
Lightweight	Khabib Nurmagomedov (c)	def.	Justin Gaethje (ic)	Technical Submission (triangle choke)	2	1:34	(Note: For the UFC Lightweight Championship.)
Middleweight	Robert Whittaker	def.	Jared Cannonier	Decision (unanimous) (29–28, 29–28, 29–28)	3	5:00
Heavyweight	Alexander Volkov	def.	Walt Harris	TKO (body kick and punches)	2	1:15
Middleweight	Phil Hawes	def.	Jacob Malkoun	KO (punches)	1	0:18
Women’s Flyweight	Lauren Murphy	def.	Liliya Shakirova	Submission (rear-naked choke)	2	3:31
Light Heavyweight	Magomed Ankalaev	def.	Ion Cuțelaba	KO (punches)	1	4:19
Preliminary card (ESPN2 / ESPN+)
Heavyweight	Tai Tuivasa	def.	Stefan Struve	KO (punches)	1	4:59
Catchweight (140 lb)	Casey Kenney	def.	Nathaniel Wood	Decision (unanimous) (29–28, 29–28, 30–27)	3	5:00
Catchweight (173 lb)	Shavkat Rakhmonov	def.	Alex Oliveira	Submission (guillotine choke)	1	4:40
Light Heavyweight	Da Woon Jung	vs.	Sam Alvey	Draw (split) (29–28, 28–29, 28–28)	3	5:00
Early preliminary card (ESPN2 / ESPN+ / UFC Fight Pass)
Women's Flyweight	Miranda Maverick	def.	Liana Jojua	TKO (doctor stoppage)	1	5:00
Catchweight (159.5 lb)	Joel Álvarez	def.	Alexander Yakovlev	Submission (armbar)	1	3:00

== Bonus awards ==
The following fighters received $50,000 bonuses.

- Fight of the Night: Casey Kenney vs. Nathaniel Wood
- Performance of the Night: Khabib Nurmagomedov and Magomed Ankalaev

== Aftermath ==
In Khabib Nurmagomedov’s post-fight interview, he announced his retirement from mixed martial arts and explained that he had promised his mother that he would not continue to fight without his late father (who died from complications related to an existing heart condition while positive with COVID-19 in July). "Today I want to say it was my last fight. No way I'm gonna come here without my father," Nurmagomedov said. "It was first time after what happened with my father. When UFC called me with Justin, I talked with my mother three days. She don't (want me) to go fight without father, but I promised her it's gonna be my last fight. And if I give my word, I have to follow this."

== Viewership ==
Just three days prior to fight night, UFC officials said they had tracked media coverage for the card in more than 50 countries, totaling more than 23 million impressions.

In Russia, UFC 254 was aired on REN TV, where it drew more than 10.8 million viewers on live television, ranking first place in Russian television ratings. The event was watched by 19.2% of the 25-54 age demographic in Russia, including 25.7% of males in that demographic. In the capital city Moscow, the event was watched by 19.8% of the 25-54 age demographic, including 26.8% of males in that demographic.

== See also ==
- List of UFC events
- List of current UFC fighters
- 2020 in UFC
