= Yas Island =

Island in Abu Dhabi, United Arab Emirates

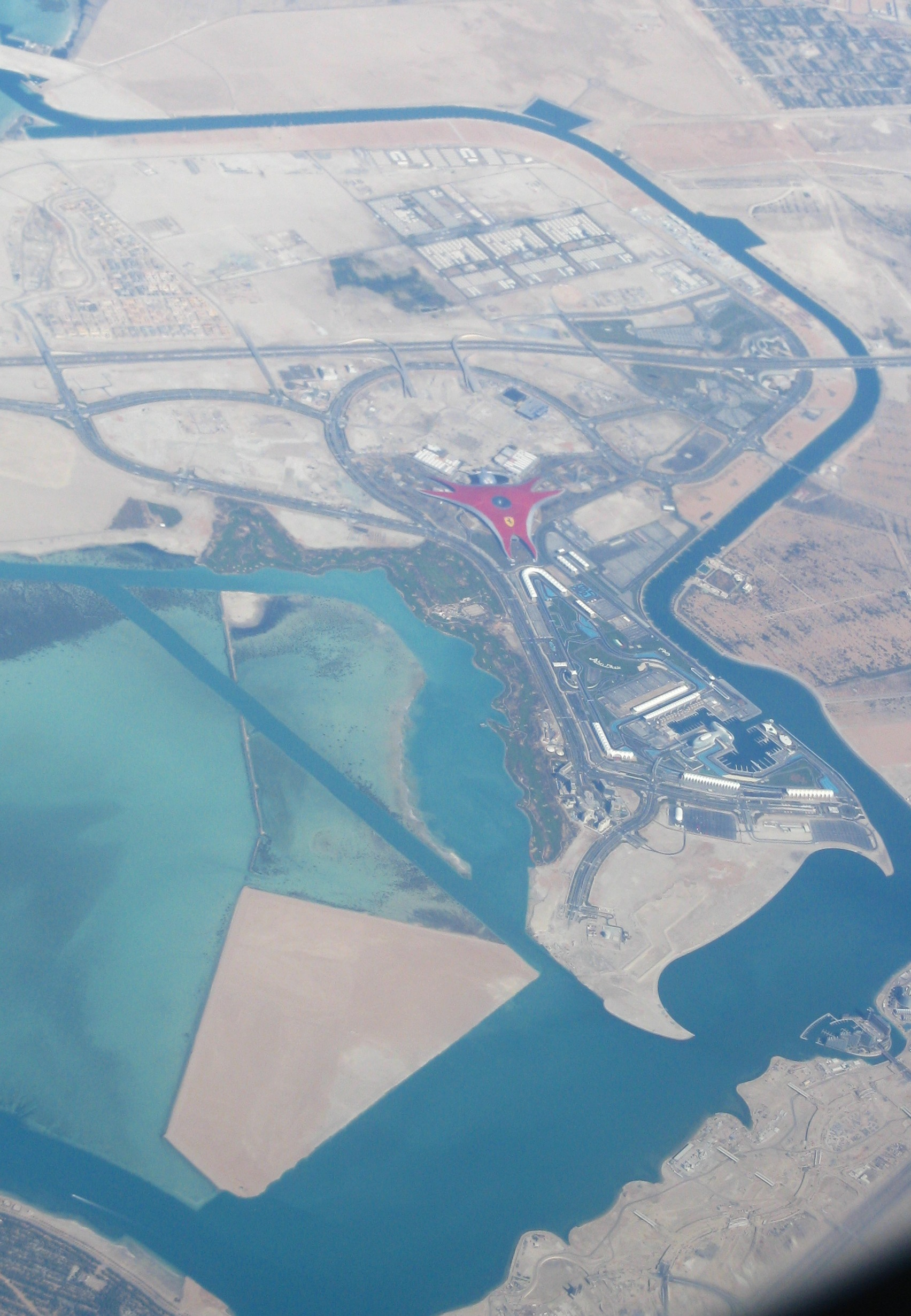
- View of Yas Island as seen from the sky (2010)
- Interactive map of Yas Island

Geography
- Coordinates: 24°30′N 54°36′E

Administration
- United Arab Emirates

Yas Island (Arabic: جزيرة ياس) is an artificial island in Abu Dhabi, United Arab Emirates named after the Arabian Bani Yas tribe. It has been created through extensive land reclamation. It occupies a total land area of 25 km^{2} (9.7 sq mi). It is a leisure island and one of the largest tourism projects in Abu Dhabi.

Yas Island holds the Yas Marina Circuit, which has hosted Formula One's Abu Dhabi Grand Prix since 2009. It is also home to Ferrari World park, which contains Formula Rossa, the once fastest rollercoaster in the world.

Yas Island was named the world's leading tourism project at the World Travel Awards in November 2009.

== Development ==
The island's development was initiated in 2006 with the aim of turning the island into a multi-purpose leisure, shopping and entertainment center. The investment was planned as a multi-staged project to unfold in phases until 2018, with project stakeholders foreseeing the possibility of extending development by adding new venues and upgrading existing facilities.

== Attractions ==
=== Ferrari World ===
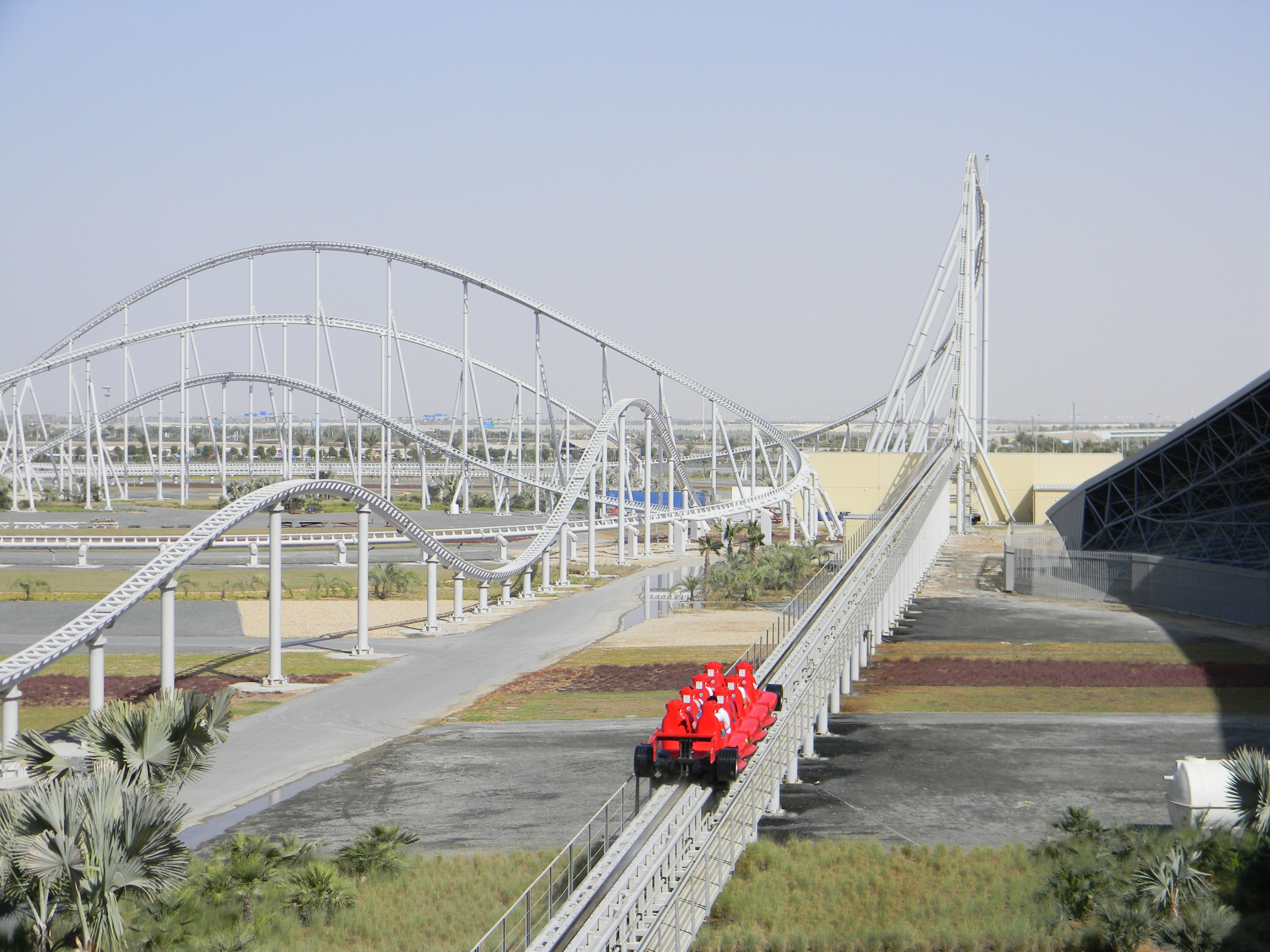
Formula Rossa, the world's fastest rollercoaster in Ferrari World Abu Dhabi

Ferrari World was opened in November 2010.

Formula Rossa, one of the park's roller coasters, was the fastest roller coaster in the world when it opened, at 240 km/h (149.1 mph). The speed record has since been broken by Falcon's Flight by 10 km/h.

=== Yas Waterworld ===
Yas Waterworld is a water park located in Yas Island. It has the Surf's up! Bubbles' Barrel slide which is the largest surf-able sheet wave surf in the world. The World Waterpark Association awarded it the Leading Edge Award in 2012.

The park was named as one of the 20 best water parks in the world by the Los Angeles Times in May 2013. It was also listed by CNN as one of the top 12 water parks in the world in July 2013. It also won the World Travel Awards award for the Middle East's Leading Tourist Attraction of the year 2013. During its five years of operation, Yas Waterworld Abu Dhabi has received more than 35 awards and it was voted the Middle East's Leading Waterpark at the World Travel Awards. In 2018, Cinesplash, a 5D water cinema attraction, was introduced to the park.

=== Warner Bros. World Abu Dhabi ===
Warner Bros. World Abu Dhabi is located on Yas Island near Ferrari World and Yas Waterworld. WB World is organized into six themed lands, Gotham City, Metropolis, Cartoon Junction, Bedrock, Dynamite Gulch and Warner Bros. Plaza. Gotham and Metropolis are based on the cities of DC Comics superheroes Batman and Superman. Warner Bros.'s Looney Tunes and Hanna-Barbera cartoon libraries are featured in Cartoon Junction and Dynamite Gulch except for Bedrock which features The Flintstones. Warner Bros. Plaza mimics the Hollywood of the past. The park opened on 25 July 2018, which makes it the world's third Warner Bros. theme park.

=== CLYMB Abu Dhabi ===
CLYMB Abu Dhabi opened in November 2019. It includes the world's tallest indoor climbing wall, at 43 meters (141 ft) tall, as well as the world's widest vertical wind tunnel, at 10 meters (33 ft) wide.

=== SeaWorld Abu Dhabi ===
On 13 December 2016, SeaWorld Parks & Entertainment announced a new partnership with Miral to bring SeaWorld Abu Dhabi a new idea to add it to Yas Island. The park, is situated to the northeast of Ferrari World, and opened in May 2023, it is the first SeaWorld without orcas. The park has developed an area of 183,000 square meters which is split into eight zones featuring more than 100,000 marine animals. Starting with Abu Dhabi Ocean to Once Ocean – the hub and spoke model of the park that transports visitors to the other realms: Micro Ocean, Endless Ocean, Tropical Ocean, Rocky Point, Polar Ocean with Arctic and Antarctica.

=== Disneyland Abu Dhabi ===
In May 2025, The Walt Disney Company announced that they will develop a theme park with Miral Group on Yas Island. The theme park will be fully developed and built by Miral, with Walt Disney Imagineering leading creative design and operational oversight. It will be the second Disney resort not to be operated by Disney Experiences in any capacity, after Tokyo Disney Resort. Miral is also responsible for many of the other attractions on Yas Island.

== Sports and entertainment ==
=== Yas Marina Circuit ===
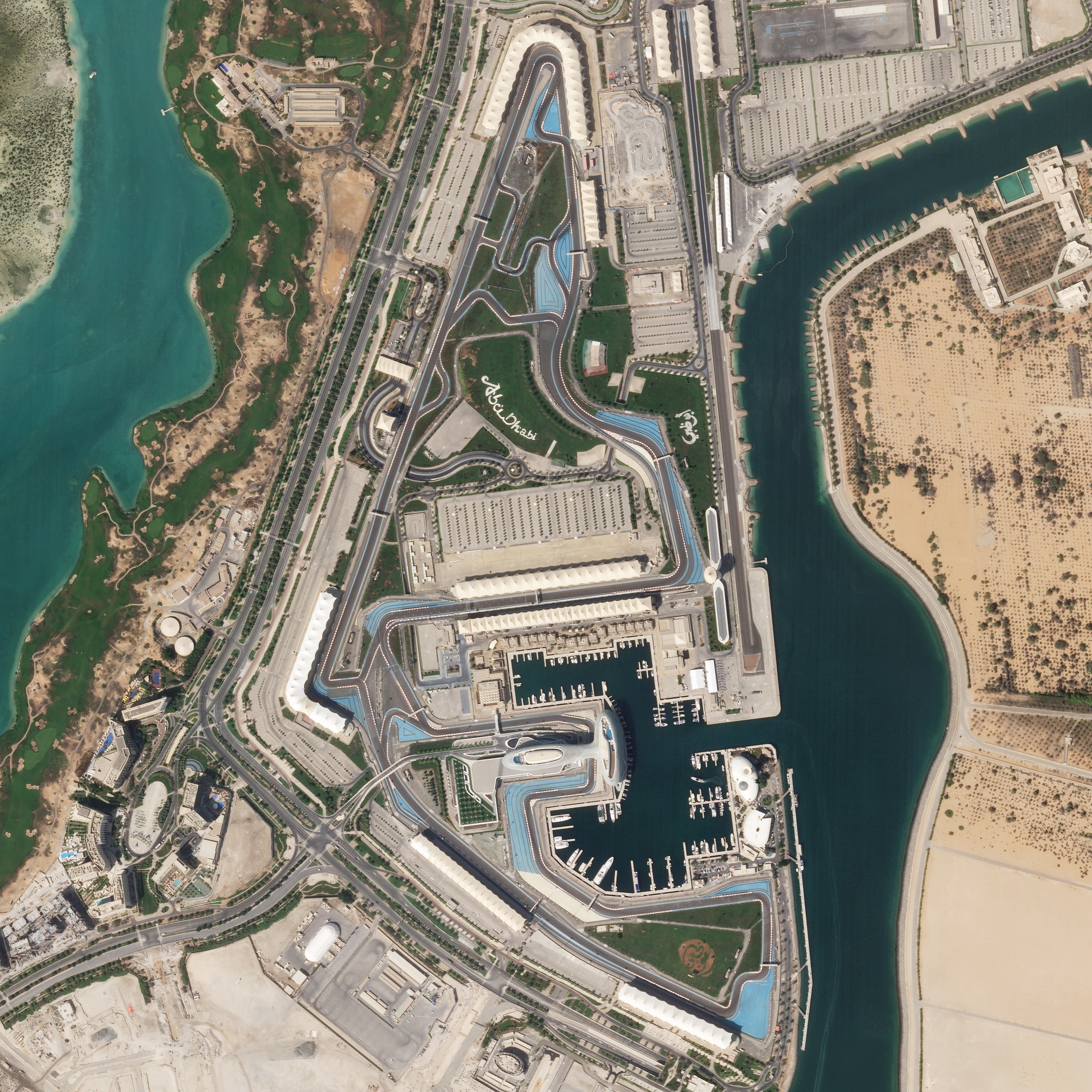
Yas Marina Circuit as seen from space.

The full circuit length is 5.554 km (3.451 mi) and can be configured in five different ways to accommodate a variety of motorsport events. Yas Marina Circuit is the only motor sports venue in the world that offers covered and shaded grandstands throughout the facility, coupled with pit lanes that run partially beneath the track. It is the venue for the Formula 1 Abu Dhabi Grand Prix since 2009.

Three charter boat companies operate from Yas Marina namely Jalboot Marine, Captain Tony's and Azure Marine. Seawings operates flights to and from Dubai to Yas Marina and 20 minute Abu Dhabi tours from Yas Marina.

=== Cycling ===
Yas Island has been part of the course of the Abu Dhabi Tour and later the UAE Tour road cycling races in the UCI World Tour.

=== Yas Links ===
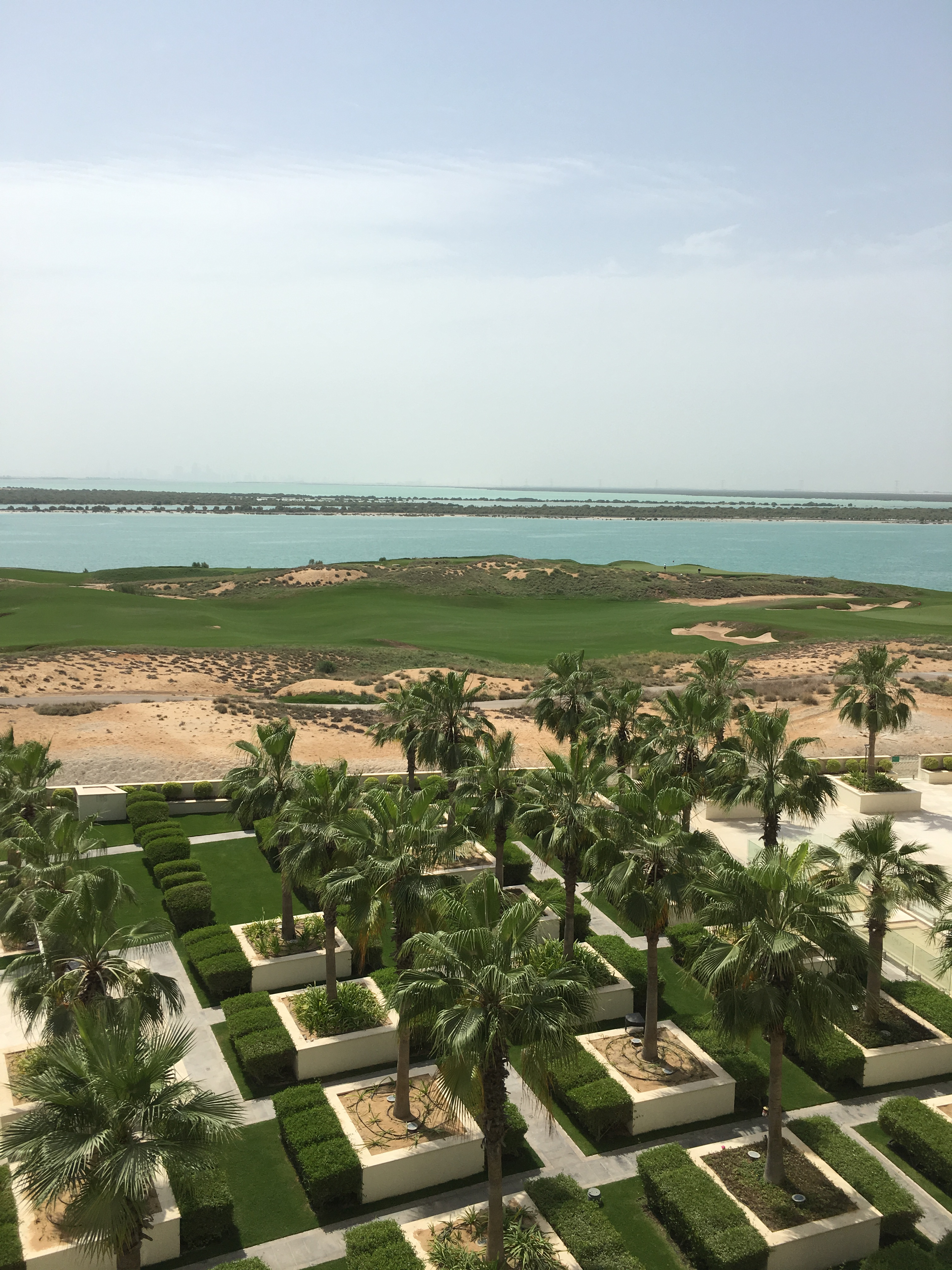
Part of Yas Links with Yas Beach in the background

Yas Links is a golf course designed by Kyle Philips, ranked 44th World's 100 Greatest Golf Courses outside the USA (Golf Digest 2018). 1.8 million cubic meters of material were dredged during construction of the course.

As of August 2019, Yas Links Abu Dhabi is managed by Troon International.

=== Yas Beach ===
Yas Beach is a beach located in Yas Island close to Yas Links. The beach is lined with mangroves. A mangrove tour is launched daily from Yas beach by the Noukhada Adventure Company.

==== Etihad Live and Forum ====
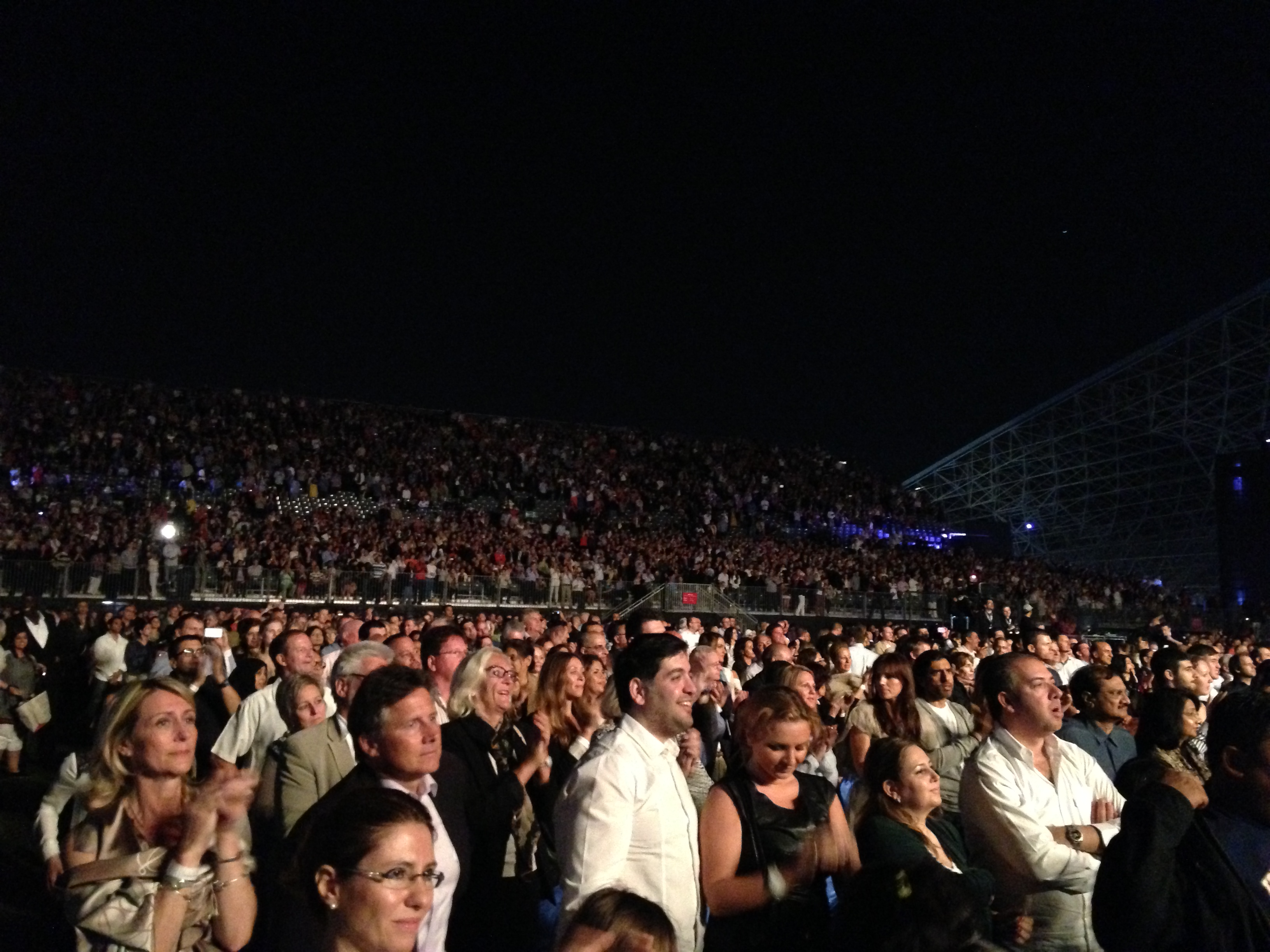
The crowd at Bocelli's Concert in du Arena, Abu Dhabi in 2013

The Etihad Live is a large open-air concert venue located in Yas Bay. The venue opened in 2009, depending on configuration, the venue can hold up to 35,000.

The re-branding preceded the first Madonna concert, part of her MDNA Tour, in the Arab region on 3 and 4 June 2012. du and Think Flash revamped the venue for Madonna's concert, including building up a new 23 m x 54 m stage and developing a complex pyrotechnic and lighting system.

The arena has hosted many international musicians under the telecom's entertainment platform du Live! in addition to Beyoncé, Madonna, including the Rolling Stones, Janet Jackson, Black Sabbath, Eric Clapton, Kylie Minogue, Shakira, Linkin Park, Nickelback, Eminem, Rihanna, Andrea Bocelli, Marie Osmond, Metallica, The Weeknd, Kanye West, Enrique Iglesias, Sting, Creamfields dance music festival featuring DJs such as Tiesto, David Guetta and Armin Van Buuren. Furthermore, the du Arena has also been the venue for the Middle East's first KCON event featuring various K-pop artists such as BTS, Taeyeon of Girls' Generation, Cho Kyuhyun of Super Junior, Monsta X, Ailee, SS301, and Spica last 25 March 2016.

=== Etihad Arena ===
Etihad Arena is an 18,000-seat indoor arena in the Yas Bay district which opened in January 2021.

==== The du World Music Festival ====
The du World Music Festival has been organized annually by du Live! and their partners since 2011. The first du World Music Festival took place at the Burj Khalifa Steps in Downtown Dubai and The Walk in JBR between 26 February and 25 March 2011, with performances by artists from around the world such as Tamer Hosny, Mona Amarcha, Janet Kapuya, Mashrou' Leila, Amit Chatterjee Alliance, Sponge Cola, Wust el Balad.

The second du World Music Festival took place also at the DownTown Burj Khalifa Steps, took place on 7–16 March 2012. Free and ticketed events included performances by Gabrielle, The Gipsy Kings, Amr Diab, Rahat Fateh Ali Khan, Stanley Clarke, Salif Keita, Sarah Geronimo, George Benson.

The third du World Music Festival took place between 22 March 2013 and 6 April 2013, and included Andrea Bocelli, Natalie Cole, Guns N' Roses, Kadim Al Sahir, Amr Diab, Eraserheads, Sonu Nigam, Train, Frank Gambale, Papon among others. This edition included performances at the du Arena in Abu Dhabi, the Dubai Media City Amphitheatre in Dubai, and in Ras Al Khaimah.

=== Ultimate Fighting Championship ===
Yas Island has hosted a number of Ultimate Fighting Championship events including UFC 112: Invincible in 2010, UFC Fight Night: Nogueira vs. Nelson in 2014, UFC 242: Khabib vs. Poirier in 2019. Amidst the COVID-19 pandemic, the UFC has used Yas Island as part of a bubble branded as "Fight Island" for selected events since UFC 251: Usman vs. Masvidal in July 2020, which hosts UFC events involving fighters impacted by U.S. COVID-19 travel restrictions. This has included numbered UFC pay-per-views, and televised UFC Fight Night cards. These events were primarily held behind closed doors at the du Forum until January 2021, when the UFC began hosting events with a limited number of spectators at the new Etihad Arena.

=== Sphere ===
In October 2024, Sphere Entertainment confirmed that it would build the Abu Dhabi Sphere location on Yas Island which would be similar to their property in Las Vegas. In July 2025, Sphere Entertainment finalized a deal with the Abu Dhabi Department of Culture and Tourism to develop the venue in Abu Dhabi. In May 2026, the Abu Dhabi Sphere received a $1.7 billion investment with the project set to complete in 2029.

== Hotels ==
The outline architecture of the W Abu Dhabi, a five star hotel located on the Yas Marina and the first hotel in world to be built over an F1 race circuit

=== Yas Hotels ===
Yas island hosts nine different hotels across the island catering to various customers and budgets with affordable 3* options up to luxurious 5* hotels.

Yas Plaza Hotels

Yas Plaza has six hotels:

- Crowne Plaza Abu Dhabi Yas Island
- Staybridge Suites Abu Dhabi Yas Island
- Radisson Blu Abu Dhabi Yas Island
- Park Inn by Radisson Blu Abu Dhabi Yas Island
- Rotana Yas Island
- Centro Yas Island

Yas Island Hotels

As well as the hotels located in Yas Plaza there four other hotels you can stay at on the island including:

- Hilton Yas Bay
- The WB Abu Dhabi
- W Hotel Yas Island
- Doubletree by Hilton Yas Island

== Transportation ==
=== Yas Express ===
Yas express Saadiyat route is a shuttle service which interlinks St. Regis Saadiyat Island Resort and Park Hyatt Abu Dhabi with Yas Island's attractions. Operating daily, the shuttle service transports guests to Ferrari World Abu Dhabi and Yas Waterworld, Yas Island and back.

== Retail ==
=== Yas Mall ===
Yas Mall is a large retail mall located in Yas Island. It is considered one of Abu Dhabi's largest malls. In January 2017, Forbes recognized Yas Mall as one of the top five shopping malls in Abu Dhabi. In close proximity to Yas Mall is IKEA. The 33,000-square-meter store with a total sales area of 19,150 square meters is the largest IKEA store in the MENA region. Previously located within the Marina Mall complex, the store was moved to Yas Island primarily due to limited room for expansion. An ACE Hardware is also located in close proximity. The Yas Island branch is the UAE's second largest ACE Hardware store, with 5,200 square meters of retail space.
