= Fernando Padilla =

Mexican mixed martial artist (born 1996)

- Born: December 15, 1996 (age 29); Ciudad Juárez, Chihuahua, Mexico
- Other names: El Valiente
- Height: 6 ft 1 in (1.85 m)
- Weight: 145 lb (66 kg; 10 st 5 lb)
- Division: Featherweight
- Fighting out of: Chihuahua City, Chihuahua, Mexico
- Team: Team Oyama; Pro Athletes
- Years active: 2015–present

Mixed martial arts record
- Total: 22
- Wins: 16
- By knockout: 5
- By submission: 9
- By decision: 2
- Losses: 6
- By knockout: 1
- By decision: 5

Other information
- Mixed martial arts record from Sherdog

Fernando Padilla (born December 15, 1996) is a Mexican professional mixed martial artist who currently competes in featherweight division of Ultimate Fighting Championship (UFC).

== Background ==
Padilla's involvement with sports began at a young age, when as a child he would defend himself against those who tried to intimidate him. He started practicing karate and Brazilian jiu-jitsu at the 10th Planet Chihuahua gym, where he began his transition to MMA.

== Mixed martial arts career ==
=== Early career ===
Padilla began his professional career in April 2015, and achieved an undefeated 5–0 record before being defeated in March 2017 by Dan Ige at a Cage Fury Championships event.

During the next four years, Padilla competed for various promotions, including Legacy Fighting Alliance and King of the Cage, where he amassed 7 wins and 3 losses.

==== Fury FC champion ====
On May 16, 2021, at Fury FC 46, Padilla defeated Cameron Graves by technical knockout after a knee strike in the second round, becoming the new Fury FC champion. It was his last fight before signing with the UFC. In that fight, he caught Dana White's attention when he executed the spinning elbow that gave him the victory.

=== Ultimate Fighting Championship ===
Padilla made his UFC promotional debut against Julian Erosa on April 29, 2023, at UFC on ESPN 45. He won the fight by technical knockout in the first round.

Padilla faced Kyle Nelson on September 16, 2023, at UFC Fight Night 227. He lost the fight by unanimous decision.

Padilla faced Luis Pajuelo on March 23, 2024, at UFC on ESPN 53. He won the fight by submission with a Brabo choke in the first round. This victory earned him the Performance of the Night award.

Padilla faced Sean Woodson on December 14, 2024, at UFC on ESPN 63. He lost the fight by technical knockout at the end of the first round.

== Championships and accomplishments ==
- Ultimate Fighting Championship
  - Performance of the Night (One time) vs. Luis Pajuelo
- Fury Fighting Championship
  - Fury FC Featherweight Championship (One time)

== Mixed martial arts record ==
Professional record breakdown
22 matches	16 wins	6 losses
By knockout	5	1
By submission	9	0
By decision	2	5

Res.	Record	Opponent	Method	Event	Date	Round	Time	Location	Notes
Loss	16–6	Sean Woodson	TKO (punches)	UFC on ESPN: Covington vs. Buckley	December 14, 2024	1	4:58	Tampa, Florida, United States	
Win	16–5	Luis Pajuelo	Submission (brabo choke)	UFC on ESPN: Ribas vs. Namajunas	March 23, 2024	1	2:45	Las Vegas, Nevada, United States	Performance of the Night.
Loss	15–5	Kyle Nelson	Decision (unanimous)	UFC Fight Night: Grasso vs. Shevchenko 2	September 16, 2023	3	5:00	Las Vegas, Nevada, United States	
Win	15–4	Julian Erosa	TKO (punches)	UFC on ESPN: Song vs. Simón	April 29, 2023	1	1:41	Las Vegas, Nevada, United States	
Win	14–4	Cameron Graves	TKO (elbow)	Fury FC 46	May 16, 2021	2	1:19	Houston, Texas, United States	Won the Fury FC Featherweight Championship.
Win	13–4	Nate Richardson	Decision (split)	LFA 99	February 12, 2021	3	5:00	Park City, Kansas, United States	Return to Featherweight.
Loss	12–4	Spike Carlyle	Decision (unanimous)	California Xtreme Fighting 17	March 9, 2019	3	5:00	Los Angeles, California, United States	Catchweight (150 lb) bout.
Win	12–3	Donald Sanchez	TKO (punches)	LFA 58	January 25, 2019	2	1:27	Albuquerque, New Mexico, United States	
Win	11–3	Fard Muhammad	Submission (triangle choke)	KOTC: 20th Anniversary	October 27, 2018	3	1:19	Ontario, California, United States	Return to Lightweight.
Loss	10–3	Kurt Kinser	Decision (split)	KOTC: Under Siege	May 4, 2018	3	5:00	Alpine, California, United States	
Loss	10–2	Talison Soares Costa	Decision (unanimous)	LFA 30	January 12, 2018	3	5:00	Costa Mesa, California, United States	
Win	10–1	Jeff Mesa	TKO (punches)	Capone's Productions: Mid-Pac 5	November 18, 2017	1	3:36	Honolulu, Hawaii, United States	
Win	9–1	Darrick Minner	Submission (triangle armbar)	LFA 25	October 20, 2017	1	3:10	Omaha, Nebraska, United States	Return to Featherweight.
Win	8–1	Ryan Fillingame	KO (punches)	KOTC: Never Quit	September 2, 2017	1	0:35	Ontario, California, United States	Lightweight debut.
Win	7–1	Sergio Perez	Submission (armbar)	California Xtreme Fighting 9	August 19, 2017	1	1:21	Los Angeles, California, United States	
Loss	6–1	Dan Ige	Decision (unanimous)	Cage Fury FC 64	March 25, 2017	3	5:00	San Diego, California, United States	
Win	6–0	Edgar Díaz Guzmán	Submission (triangle choke)	Combate Extremo: Nino vs. Loco	November 18, 2016	1	1:12	Monterrey, Mexico	
Win	5–0	Keni Harrison	Submission (armbar)	Red Cage 5	June 11, 2016	1	0:44	Chihuahua, Mexico	
Win	4–0	Kaleb Gonzales	Submission (armbar)	Red Cage 2	December 19, 2015	1	N/A	Chihuahua, Mexico	Catchweight (150 lb) bout.
Win	3–0	Kaleb Gonzales	Submission (triangle choke)	MMA Revolution: Equipo Durango vs. Equipo Chihuahua	November 20, 2015	1	2:50	Durango, Mexico	
Win	2–0	José Landeros González	Submission (armbar)	Red Cage 1	August 15, 2015	1	2:03	Chihuahua, Mexico	Featherweight debut.
Win	1–0	Carlos Rivera	Decision (unanimous)	World Best Gladiators 8	April 18, 2015	3	5:00	Chihuahua, Mexico	Bantamweight debut.

== See also ==
- List of current UFC fighters
- List of Mexican UFC fighters
- List of male mixed martial artists
