= Ignacio Bahamondes =

Chilean mixed martial artist (born 1997)

- Born: Ignacio Antonio Bahamondes Carabantes; August 27, 1997 (age 29); Santiago, Chile
- Other names: La Jaula
- Height: 6 ft 3 in (1.91 m)
- Weight: 170 lb (77 kg; 12 st 2 lb)
- Division: Lightweight (2017–2019; 2021–2026); Welterweight (2015–2017; 2018, 2020, 2026–present)
- Reach: 75 in (191 cm)
- Style: Amateur Kickboxing
- Fighting out of: Chicago, Illinois, U.S.
- Team: Young Tigers (formerly); Valle Flow Striking (2015–present)
- Years active: 2015–present

Mixed martial arts record
- Total: 25
- Wins: 18
- By knockout: 11
- By submission: 2
- By decision: 5
- Losses: 7
- By submission: 2
- By decision: 5

Amateur kickboxing record
- Total: 36
- Wins: 35
- Losses: 0
- Draws: 1

Other information
- Mixed martial arts record from Sherdog

Ignacio Antonio Bahamondes Carabantes (born August 27, 1997) is a Chilean professional mixed martial artist who currently competes in the Welterweight division of the Ultimate Fighting Championship (UFC). He is also the inaugural lightweight champion in LUX Fight League.

== Background ==
Born and raised in Santiago, Chile, he followed his father's footsteps into kickboxing; his father is a former South American WKN kickboxing champion. After a successful amateur kickboxing career, he moved to the United States at the age of 16 to pursue a career in mixed martial arts, settling in Miami alone and speaking no English.

== Mixed martial arts career ==
=== Early career ===
During his early career, where he started off at welterweight to eventually debut at lightweight, Bahamondes racked up a 10–3 record while competing in both the North and South American regional circuits, eventually claiming the LUX Fight League lightweight championship.

=== Dana White's Contender Series ===
Bahamondes was invited to compete at Dana White's Contender Series 34 against Edson Gomez on November 4, 2020. He won the bout via second-round knockout and was awarded a contract by the Ultimate Fighting Championship.

=== Ultimate Fighting Championship ===
Bahamondes faced John Makdessi on April 10, 2021, at UFC on ABC 2. At the weigh-ins, Bahamondes weighed in at 156.75 pounds, 0.75 pounds over the lightweight non-title fight limit. The bout proceeded at a catchweight and Bahamondes was fined 20% of his individual purse, which went to Makdessi. Bahamondes lost the bout via split decision.

He made his sophomore appearance in the organization against Roosevelt Roberts at UFC on ESPN 29 on August 21, 2021. He won the fight via knockout five seconds before the ending bell in the third round. The finish earned him his first Performance of the Night bonus award.

Bahamondes faced Rong Zhu at UFC Fight Night 202 on February 26, 2022. He won the bout via submission in the third round.

Bahamondes was scheduled to face Ľudovít Klein on July 30, 2022, at UFC 277. However, Bahamondes pulled out of the bout on July 15.

Bahamondes was scheduled to face Nikolas Motta on April 8, 2023, at UFC 287. However, Motta pulled out in late March due to a cut on his head and was replaced by Trey Ogden, with the bout taking place at a catchweight of 160 pounds. Bahamondes won the bout via unanimous decision.

Bahamondes was rescheduled to face Ľudovít Klein on August 5, 2023, at UFC Fight Night 226. He lost the fight via unanimous decision.

Bahamondes faced Christos Giagos on April 6, 2024, at UFC Fight Night 240. He won by a head kick knockout in the first round. This fight earned him another Performance of the Night award.

Bahamondes faced Manuel Torres on September 14, 2024, at UFC 306. He won the fight by technical knockout in the first round. This fight earned him his second straight Performance of the Night award.

Bahamondes faced Jalin Turner on March 8, 2025, at UFC 313. He won the fight via a triangle choke submission in the first round. This fight earned him a third straight Performance of the Night award.

Bahamondes faced Rafael Fiziev on June 21, 2025, at UFC on ABC 8. He lost the fight by unanimous decision.

Bahamondes faced Tofiq Musayev on March 28, 2026 at UFC Fight Night 271. He lost the fight by unanimous decision. This fight earned him a $100,000 Fight of the Night award.

Returning to the welterweight division, Bahamondes faced Muslim Salikhov on September 12, 2026 at UFC Fight Night 288. He won the fight by unanimous decision.

Bahamondes is scheduled to face Chidi Njokuani on January 16, 2027, at UFC Fight Night 296.

== Championships and accomplishments ==
- Ultimate Fighting Championship
  - Fight of the Night (One time) vs. Tofiq Musayev
  - Performance of the Night (Four times) vs. Roosevelt Roberts, Christos Giagos, Manuel Torres and Jalin Turner
  - UFC Honors Awards
    - 2021: Fan's Choice Knockout of the Year Nominee vs. Roosevelt Roberts
  - UFC.com Awards
    - 2021: Ranked #5 Knockout of the Year vs. Roosevelt Roberts
- LUX Fight League
  - LUX Lightweight Championship (One time; inaugural)

== Mixed martial arts record ==
Professional record breakdown
25 matches	18 wins	7 losses
By knockout	11	0
By submission	2	2
By decision	5	5

Res.	Record	Opponent	Method	Event	Date	Round	Time	Location	Notes
Win	18–7	Muslim Salikhov	Decision (unanimous)	UFC Fight Night: Silva vs. Delgado	September 12, 2026	3	5:00	Glendale, Arizona, United States	Return to Welterweight.
Loss	17–7	Tofiq Musayev	Decision (unanimous)	UFC Fight Night: Adesanya vs. Pyfer	March 28, 2026	3	5:00	Seattle, Washington, United States	Fight of the Night.
Loss	17–6	Rafael Fiziev	Decision (unanimous)	UFC on ABC: Hill vs. Rountree Jr.	June 21, 2025	3	5:00	Baku, Azerbaijan	
Win	17–5	Jalin Turner	Submission (triangle choke)	UFC 313	March 8, 2025	1	2:29	Las Vegas, Nevada, United States	Performance of the Night.
Win	16–5	Manuel Torres	TKO (punches)	UFC 306	September 14, 2024	1	4:02	Las Vegas, Nevada, United States	Performance of the Night.
Win	15–5	Christos Giagos	KO (head kick)	UFC Fight Night: Allen vs. Curtis 2	April 6, 2024	1	3:34	Las Vegas, Nevada, United States	Performance of the Night.
Loss	14–5	Ľudovít Klein	Decision (unanimous)	UFC on ESPN: Sandhagen vs. Font	August 5, 2023	3	5:00	Nashville, Tennessee, United States	
Win	14–4	Trey Ogden	Decision (unanimous)	UFC 287	April 8, 2023	3	5:00	Miami, Florida, United States	Catchweight (160 lb) bout.
Win	13–4	Rong Zhu	Submission (brabo choke)	UFC Fight Night: Makhachev vs. Green	February 26, 2022	3	1:40	Las Vegas, Nevada, United States	Catchweight (160 lb) bout; Rong missed weight.
Win	12–4	Roosevelt Roberts	KO (spinning wheel kick)	UFC on ESPN: Cannonier vs. Gastelum	August 21, 2021	3	4:55	Las Vegas, Nevada, United States	Performance of the Night.
Loss	11–4	John Makdessi	Decision (split)	UFC on ABC: Vettori vs. Holland	April 10, 2021	3	5:00	Las Vegas, Nevada, United States	Return to Lightweight; Bahamondes missed weight (156.75 lb).
Win	11–3	Edson Gomez	KO (front kick)	Dana White's Contender Series 34	November 4, 2020	2	2:31	Las Vegas, Nevada, United States	
Win	10–3	Chris Brown	Decision (split)	LFA 90	September 4, 2020	3	5:00	Sioux Falls, South Dakota, United States	Return to Welterweight.
Loss	9–3	Salvador Becerra	Decision (unanimous)	Combate Americas 50	November 22, 2019	3	5:00	Fresno, California, United States	
Win	9–2	Hugo Flores	Decision (unanimous)	LUX 004	March 15, 2019	5	5:00	Mexico City, Mexico	Won the LUX Fight League Lightweight Championship.
Win	8–2	Javier Reyes	TKO (body kick and punches)	LUX 003	October 5, 2018	1	2:53	Mexico City, Mexico	Welterweight bout.
Win	7–2	Gerardo Chaparro	TKO (punches)	Combate Extremo: Loco vs. Gallito	December 1, 2017	2	3:59	Monterrey, Mexico	
Win	6–2	Francisco Javier Etchart Diaz	KO (punch)	Combate Extremo: Flores vs. Baltazar	September 1, 2017	1	1:20	Monterrey, Mexico	
Win	5–2	Oziel Rodriguez Lopez	Decision (unanimous)	Champions Nights Challengers 3	July 15, 2017	3	5:00	Zacatecas, Mexico	Lightweight debut; Bahamondes missed weight (158 lb).
Loss	4–2	Matt McKeon	Submission (rear-naked choke)	Island Fights 40	April 14, 2017	1	3:08	Pensacola, Florida, United States	
Win	4–1	Rafael Carolino	KO (head kick)	Guerra Campal 3	November 12, 2016	1	3:01	Santiago, Chile	
Win	3–1	Dion Rizzuto	TKO (punches)	Island Fights 38	August 13, 2016	1	1:03	Pensacola, Florida, United States	
Loss	2–1	Preston Parsons	Submission (armbar)	Titan FC 39	June 10, 2016	1	2:59	Coral Gables, Florida, United States	
Win	2–0	Rodrigo Tavares	KO (punches)	Island Fights 37	March 11, 2016	1	1:03	Pensacola, Florida, United States	
Win	1–0	Craig McAlpine	KO (punch)	Island Fights 36	November 21, 2015	1	2:31	Pensacola, Florida, United States	Welterweight debut.

== See also ==
- List of current UFC fighters
- List of Dana White's Contender Series alumni
- List of male mixed martial artists
