= Sasha Palatnikov =

American mixed martial arts fighter

- Born: March 15, 1989 (age 37); British Hong Kong
- Nationality: American
- Height: 6 ft 0 in (1.83 m)
- Weight: 170 lb (77 kg; 12 st 2 lb)
- Division: Welterweight
- Reach: 72 1/2 in (184 cm)
- Fighting out of: Las Vegas, Nevada, U.S.
- Team: Warrior Academy (until 2019); Syndicate MMA (2019–present)
- Years active: 2017–present

Mixed martial arts record
- Total: 14
- Wins: 8
- By knockout: 4
- By decision: 4
- Losses: 6
- By knockout: 3
- By submission: 3

Other information
- University: University at Buffalo
- Mixed martial arts record from Sherdog

Sasha Palatnikov (born March 15, 1989) is an American mixed martial artist, born in Hong Kong, who competed in the Welterweight division of the Ultimate Fighting Championship. He currently competes in Karate Combat.

== Background ==
Palatnikov, the son of a Russian father, who was a professional high diver, and a Scottish mother, was born and raised in Hong Kong but spent many summers in Brooklyn as a kid, specifically Brighton Beach. Due to this, he has a conversational level of knowledge in Cantonese. His parents put him in Karate at the age of five. He started playing rugby at the age of six and would train Muay Thai and boxing in the off seasons. He played rugby professionally, but due to an injury, decided to retire and go pursue an education.

Palatnikov was the Hong Kong Heavyweight Amateur Boxing Association Champion in 2012 and hoped to represent Hong Kong at the Olympic qualifiers, but he was unable to do so due to eligibility restrictions.

Sasha also spent time in the United States and Canada throughout his college career, studying and playing American football and rugby at Concordia University, Hudson Valley Community College, and the University of Buffalo, graduating with a communications degree and minored in computer science. During this time he also obtained a US citizenship from his time studying.

In 2014, Palatnikov was sentenced to a 2-year prison sentence by the Hong Kong District Court for a robbery in 2013. The incident occurred when Sasha was helping a South African citizen recover a HK$10,000 debt from an Australian man. HK$70,000 in cash was stolen after the pair forced their way into his flat. At the time, Sasha was a computer programmer who was described as "a straight-A student" and excellent rugby player, claimed he had agreed to help his friend in what he thought would be a purely verbal confrontation with the Australian. Dawson, the Australian, was kicked and punched by the South African while being held by Palatnikov, the court heard. After serving 16 months, Palatnikov was released in 2015.

Within a month of his release, Palatnikov went to the Philippines to compete in a jiu-jitsu competition, then moved to Florida to train at the Blackzilians team gym in Boca Raton.

== Martial arts career ==
=== Early career ===
After making his debut in 2017, losing to Emmanuel Verdier via TKO in the second round at Fight Time 36, in 2018, he returned to Hong Kong with his girlfriend, initially just for two weeks on holiday to get his permanent ID renewed. A friend put him in touch with local promotion Just MMA, who asked if he wanted to fight on their upcoming card. He won the bout via knockout in the second round and his opponents manager became his manager as well.

After a one off unanimous decision win against Jeremy Bastian at Combat FC 1 in China, Sasha joined the Angel Fight Championship, where he won his first bout against Jae Young Ahn at AFC 10 on January 28, 2019, via unanimous decision. He then moved up to Middleweight for his next bout in the promotion, winning the AFC Middleweight Championship against Sun Won Son at AFC 12. In the process, Palatnikov became the first Hong Kong-born MMA champion.

Sasha then fought for the UAE Warriors promotion, where he faced fellow future UFC fighter, Mounir Lazzez at UAE Warriors 8. He lost the bout via TKO at the end of the first round.

Palatnikov faced late replacement Paulo Henrique at UAE Warriors 13 in a catchweight bout, winning the bout in the first round.

=== Ultimate Fighting Championship ===
Palatnikov made his promotion debut against Louis Cosce on November 21, 2020, at UFC 255. He won the bout via TKO in the third round. This fight earned him the Fight of the Night award.

In his sophomore appearance in the organization, Palatnikov faced Impa Kasanganay on April 10, 2021, at UFC on ABC 2. He lost the fight via second-round submission.

Palatnikov faced Ramiz Brahimaj on August 21, 2021, at UFC on ESPN 29. He lost the fight via technical submission due to a rear naked choke in round one.

On February 10, 2022, it was announced that Palatnikov was released by the UFC.

=== Post UFC ===
Palatnikov faced Kyron Bowen on April 2, 2022 at XMMA 4. He won the bout via TKO stoppage due to punches and elbows.

Palatnikov faced Joshua Jones on May 20, 2022 at Tuff-N-Uff 128. He won the bout via split decision.

Palatnikov faced Tanner Saraceno at XMMA 5 on July 23, 2022. He lost the bout via rear-naked choke in the third round.

Palatnikov faced Francisco Trinaldo at Gamebred Bareknuckle MMA 6 on October 28, 2023. He lost the fight via TKO due to injury in the first round.

=== Karate Combat ===
Palatnikov signed with Karate Combat on December 17, 2022, winning his debut against Canadian Rob Buxton by knockout in the first round at Karate Combat 37.

Palatnikov next faced Adrian Hadribeaj of Albania at Karate Combat 38 on April 1, 2023, losing by split decision.

Palatnikov faced former karate and kickboxing champion Raymond Daniels at Karate Combat 39 on May 20, 2023, where he lost by unanimous decision.

Palatnikov faced Gustavo Sousa at Karate Combat 49 on September 18, 2024, and lost via first‑round knockout. The finish occurred after he was dropped, resulting in a neck injury.

=== Gamebred Bareknuckle MMA ===
Palatanikov faced Francisco Trinaldo at Gamebred Bareknuckle MMA 6 on November 10, 2023. He lost the fight via TKO due to injury in the first round.

=== Dirty Boxing Career ===
Palatnikov made his debut with Mike Perry's "Dirty Boxing Championships" at Dirty Boxing Championship 2 on June 14, 2025. He faced Phil Hawes and won via first‑round disqualification due to repeated eye pokes committed by Hawes.

== Championships and accomplishments ==
=== Mixed martial arts ===
- Ultimate Fighting Championship
  - Fight of the Night (One Time) vs. Louis Cosce
- Angel's Fighting Championship
  - AFC Middleweight Championship (One time)

== Karate Combat record ==
Professional record breakdown
5 matches	1 win	4 losses
By knockout	1	2
By decision	0	2

Res.	Record	Opponent	Method	Event	Date	Round	Time	Location	Notes
Loss	1–3	Gustavo Sousa	KO (slam)	Karate Combat 49	September 18, 2024	3	3:00	Marina Bay, Singapore	
Loss	1–2	Raymond Daniels	Decision (unanimous)	Karate Combat 39	May 20, 2023	3	3:00	Miami, Florida, United States	
Loss	1–1	Adrian Hadribeaj	Decision (split)	Karate Combat 38	April 1, 2023	3	3:00	Miami, Florida, United States	
Win	1–0	Rob Buxton	TKO (punches)	Karate Combat 37	December 17, 2022	1	2:38	Orlando, Florida, United States	

== Mixed martial arts record ==
Professional record breakdown
14 matches	8 wins	6 losses
By knockout	4	3
By submission	0	3
By decision	4	0

Res.	Record	Opponent	Method	Event	Date	Round	Time	Location	Notes
Loss	8–6	Francisco Trinaldo	TKO (knee injury)	Gamebred Fighting Championship 6	November 10, 2023	1	1:55	Biloxi, Mississippi, United States	Bare knuckle MMA.
Loss	8–5	Tanner Saraceno	Submission (rear-naked choke)	XMMA 5	July 23, 2022	3	4:08	Columbia, South Carolina, United States	
Win	8–4	Joshua Jones	Decision (split)	Tuff-N-Uff 128	May 20, 2022	3	5:00	Las Vegas, Nevada, United States	
Win	7–4	Kyron Bowen	TKO (punches and elbows)	XMMA 4	April 2, 2022	1	4:03	New Orleans, Louisiana, United States	
Loss	6–4	Ramiz Brahimaj	Technical Submission (rear-naked choke)	UFC on ESPN: Cannonier vs. Gastelum	August 21, 2021	1	2:33	Las Vegas, Nevada, United States	
Loss	6–3	Impa Kasanganay	Submission (rear-naked choke)	UFC on ABC: Vettori vs. Holland	April 10, 2021	2	0:26	Las Vegas, Nevada, United States	
Win	6–2	Louis Cosce	TKO (punches)	UFC 255	November 21, 2020	3	2:27	Las Vegas, Nevada, United States	Fight of the Night.
Win	5–2	Paulo Henrique	TKO (punches)	UAE Warriors 13	September 25, 2020	1	1:23	Abu Dhabi, United Arab Emirates	Catchweight (182 lb) bout.
Loss	4–2	Mounir Lazzez	TKO (elbows and punches)	UAE Warriors 8	October 18, 2019	1	4:48	Abu Dhabi, United Arab Emirates	
Win	4–1	Sung Won Son	Decision (unanimous)	AFC 12	June 10, 2019	5	5:00	Seoul, South Korea	Won vacant AFC Middleweight Championship. Middlweight bout.
Win	3–1	Jae Young Ahn	Decision (unanimous)	AFC 10	January 28, 2019	2	5:00	Seoul, South Korea	
Win	2–1	Jeremy Bastian	Decision (unanimous)	Combat FC 1: Inception	June 10, 2018	3	5:00	Dingcheng, China	
Win	1–1	Seok Hyun Ko	KO (punch)	Just MMA 3	March 16, 2018	2	1:22	Wan Chai, Hong Kong	Welterweight debut.
Loss	0–1	Emmanuel Verdier	TKO	Fight Time 36	April 7, 2017	2	4:40	Fort Lauderdale, Florida, United States	

== See also ==
- List of male mixed martial artists
