= UFC on ESPN: Cannonier vs. Gastelum =

2021 MMA event

- The poster for UFC on ESPN: Cannonier vs. Gastelum
- Promotion: Ultimate Fighting Championship
- Date: August 21, 2021
- Venue: UFC Apex
- City: Enterprise, Nevada, United States
- Attendance: Not announced

Event chronology
UFC 265: Lewis vs. Gane	UFC on ESPN: Cannonier vs. Gastelum	UFC on ESPN: Barboza vs. Chikadze

UFC on ESPN: Cannonier vs. Gastelum (also known as UFC on ESPN 29 and UFC Vegas 34) was a mixed martial arts event produced by the Ultimate Fighting Championship that took place on August 21, 2021, at the UFC Apex facility in Enterprise, Nevada, part of the Las Vegas Metropolitan Area, United States.

== Background ==
A middleweight bout between former UFC Middleweight Championship challenger Paulo Costa and Jared Cannonier was expected headline this event. However, on June 4, Costa withdrew from the bout for unknown reasons and was replaced by former interim title challenger and The Ultimate Fighter: Team Jones vs. Team Sonnen middleweight winner Kelvin Gastelum. Costa later claimed he never signed the bout agreement and had issues with his payment, while not confirming them as the reason for his withdrawal.

A heavyweight bout between Chase Sherman and Parker Porter took place at this event. The pairing was previously scheduled to take place at UFC on ESPN: Whittaker vs. Gastelum, but Porter was removed from that contest due to undisclosed reasons.

Brian Kelleher and Domingo Pilarte met in a bantamweight bout at this event. The pairing was previously scheduled to take place in November 2018 at UFC 230, but Pilarte pulled out due to injury.

A bantamweight bout between Mana Martinez and Jesse Strader was expected to take place at this event. However, just over a week before the event, Strader withdrew from the bout for unknown reasons and was replaced by Trevin Jones. In turn, Martinez pulled out during fight week due to undisclosed reasons. Jones was then matched up with Saidyokub Kakhramonov. At the weigh-ins, Kakhramonov weighed in at 138.5 pounds, two and a half pounds over the bantamweight non-title fight limit. The bout proceeded at a catchweight and he forfeited 20% of his purse to Jones.

A women's flyweight bout between Cortney Casey and Liana Jojua in women's flyweight was scheduled for this event. However, Jojua was forced out of the fight due to visa issues. The matchup is expected to remain intact and be rescheduled for a later event.

Antônio Braga Neto and Abdul Razak Alhassan were expected to meet in a middleweight bout at this event. They were eventually rescheduled for UFC on ESPN: Barboza vs. Chikadze the following week.

== Results ==
Main card (ESPN / ESPN+)
Weight class				Method	Round	Time	Notes
Middleweight	Jared Cannonier	def.	Kelvin Gastelum	Decision (unanimous) (48–47, 48–47, 48–47)	5	5:00
Lightweight	Mark Madsen	def.	Clay Guida	Decision (split) (29–28, 28–29, 30–27)	3	5:00
Heavyweight	Parker Porter	def.	Chase Sherman	Decision (unanimous) (30–27, 30–27, 29–28)	3	5:00
Catchweight (138.5 lb)	Saidyokub Kakhramonov	def.	Trevin Jones	Technical Submission (guillotine choke)	3	4:39
Lightweight	Vinc Pichel	def.	Austin Hubbard	Decision (unanimous) (30–27, 30–27, 30–27)	3	5:00
Flyweight	Alexandre Pantoja	def.	Brandon Royval	Submission (rear-naked choke)	2	1:46
Preliminary card (ESPN2 / ESPN+)
Featherweight	Austin Lingo	def.	Luis Saldaña	Decision (unanimous) (29–28, 29–28, 29–28)	3	5:00
Bantamweight	Brian Kelleher	def.	Domingo Pilarte	Decision (unanimous) (30–27, 30–27, 30–27)	3	5:00
Women’s Bantamweight	Josiane Nunes	def.	Bea Malecki	KO (punch)	1	4:54
Light Heavyweight	William Knight	def.	Fabio Cherant	KO (punches)	1	3:58
Lightweight	Ignacio Bahamondes	def.	Roosevelt Roberts	KO (spinning wheel kick)	3	4:55
Welterweight	Ramiz Brahimaj	def.	Sasha Palatnikov	Technical Submission (rear-naked choke)	1	2:33

== Bonus awards ==
The following fighters received $50,000 bonuses.

- Fight of the Night: No bonus awarded.
- Performance of the Night: Alexandre Pantoja, Josiane Nunes, William Knight and Ignacio Bahamondes

== See also ==
- List of UFC events
- List of current UFC fighters
- 2021 in UFC
