= UFC on ABC: Vettori vs. Holland =

UFC mixed martial arts event in 2021

- The poster for UFC on ABC: Vettori vs. Holland
- Promotion: Ultimate Fighting Championship
- Date: April 10, 2021
- Venue: UFC Apex
- City: Enterprise, Nevada, United States
- Attendance: None (behind closed doors)

Event chronology
UFC 260: Miocic vs. Ngannou 2	UFC on ABC: Vettori vs. Holland	UFC on ESPN: Whittaker vs. Gastelum

UFC on ABC: Vettori vs. Holland (also known as UFC on ABC 2 and UFC Vegas 23) was a mixed martial arts event produced by the Ultimate Fighting Championship that took place on April 10, 2021 at the UFC Apex facility in Enterprise, Nevada, part of the Las Vegas Metropolitan Area, United States.

== Background ==
This was the first event to feature Venum as the new UFC's official uniform partner. The promotion had previously been partnered with Reebok since 2014, before signing a deal with Venum in July 2020 that would be made effective April 2021.

A middleweight bout between former UFC Welterweight Championship challenger Darren Till and Marvin Vettori was expected to serve as the event headliner. However, Till withdrew from the fight on March 30 due to a broken collarbone. It was announced on April 1 that Kevin Holland would step in on 9 days notice to face Vettori. By making his second main event appearance in three weeks, Holland tied the record for shortest turnaround between two main events.

A middleweight bout between Zak Cummings and Sam Alvey was expected to take place at the event. However, Cummings withdrew from the bout on March 11 due to undisclosed reasons and was replaced by Julian Marquez.

A light heavyweight bout between Shamil Gamzatov and Da Un Jung was scheduled for the preliminary portion of the card. However, Gamzatov was removed from the bout on March 24 due to alleged visa issues and replaced by William Knight.

Bea Malecki was expected to face Norma Dumont in a women's bantamweight bout at this event. However, Malecki pulled out a week before the contest due to undisclosed reasons and was replaced by promotional newcomer Erin Blanchfield.

A middleweight bout between Kyle Daukaus and Aliaskhab Khizriev was expected to take place at the event. However, the bout was pulled from the card on April 7 due to COVID-19 protocols.

At the weigh-ins, Ignacio Bahamondes and Norma Dumont missed weight for the respective bouts. Bahamondes weighed in at 156.75 pounds, three quarters of a pound over the lightweight non-title fight limit. His bout proceeded at a catchweight and he was fined 20% of his individual purse, which went to his opponent John Makdessi. Dumont weighed in at 139.5 pounds, three and a half pounds over the women's bantamweight non-title fight limit. Her bout with Blanchfield was cancelled by the Nevada State Athletic Commission.

== Results ==
Main card (ABC / ESPN+)
Weight class				Method	Round	Time	Notes
Middleweight	Marvin Vettori	def.	Kevin Holland	Decision (unanimous) (50–44, 50–44, 50–44)	5	5:00
Featherweight	Arnold Allen	def.	Sodiq Yusuff	Decision (unanimous) (29–28, 29–28, 29–28)	3	5:00
Middleweight	Julian Marquez	def.	Sam Alvey	Technical Submission (rear-naked choke)	2	2:07
Women’s Strawweight	Mackenzie Dern	def.	Nina Nunes	Submission (armbar)	1	4:48
Welterweight	Daniel Rodriguez	def.	Mike Perry	Decision (unanimous) (30–27, 30–27, 30–26)	3	5:00
Preliminary card (ESPN / ESPN+)
Lightweight	Joe Solecki	def.	Jim Miller	Decision (unanimous) (29–28, 29–28, 30–27)	3	5:00
Lightweight	Mateusz Gamrot	def.	Scott Holtzman	KO (punches)	2	1:22
Catchweight (156.75 lb)	John Makdessi	def.	Ignacio Bahamondes	Decision (split) (28–29, 29–28, 30–27)	3	5:00
Heavyweight	Jarjis Danho	def.	Yorgan De Castro	KO (punch)	1	3:02
Bantamweight	Jack Shore	def.	Hunter Azure	Decision (split) (30–27, 28–29, 30–27)	3	5:00
Featherweight	Luis Saldaña	def.	Jordan Griffin	Decision (unanimous) (29–28, 29–28, 29–28)	3	5:00
Light Heavyweight	Da Un Jung	def.	William Knight	Decision (unanimous) (30–26, 30–26, 30–27)	3	5:00
Early preliminary card (ESPN+)
Welterweight	Impa Kasanganay	def.	Sasha Palatnikov	Submission (rear-naked choke)	2	0:26

== Bonus awards ==
The following fighters received $50,000 bonuses.

- Fight of the Night: Julian Marquez vs. Sam Alvey
- Performance of the Night: Mackenzie Dern and Mateusz Gamrot

== See also ==
- List of UFC events
- List of current UFC fighters
- 2021 in UFC
