= Tanner Boser =

Canadian mixed martial artist

- Born: Tanner Boser; August 2, 1991 (age 35); Bonnyville, Alberta, Canada
- Other names: The Bulldozer
- Height: 6 ft 2 in (1.88 m)
- Weight: 265 lb (120 kg; 18 st 13 lb)
- Division: Heavyweight (2012–present); Light Heavyweight (2014, 2023)
- Reach: 75.5 in (192 cm)
- Fighting out of: Edmonton, Alberta, Canada
- Team: Bonnyville BJJ (2013); Hayabusa / The Little Sweatshop (2013–2025); Frank Lee's Muay Thai
- Trainer: Jeff Montemurro, Keijiro Noda (kickboxing)
- Rank: Black belt in Shitō-ryū Karate; Purple belt in Brazilian Jiu-Jitsu
- Years active: 2012–present

Mixed martial arts record
- Total: 35
- Wins: 23
- By knockout: 13
- By submission: 2
- By decision: 8
- Losses: 11
- By knockout: 3
- By decision: 8
- Draws: 1

Other information
- Occupation: Bouncer
- Mixed martial arts record from Sherdog

Tanner Boser (born August 2, 1991) is a Canadian mixed martial arts (MMA) fighter who competes in the Ultimate Fighting Championship. He has mostly fought as a heavyweight, with occasional bouts as a light heavyweight. He had previously competed for Unified MMA, where he won the Unified MMA Heavyweight Championship twice. He has also competed in M-1 Global and King of the Cage.

== Background ==
Boser was born and raised in Bonnyville, Alberta, Canada, by a gym owner mother and oil field worker father. Tanner was homeschooled until high school. He has a brother, Landon, who is also a professional mixed martial artist. He trained karate for almost a decade while growing up, reaching a black belt in the discipline. After graduating from high school, Boser worked in the local oilfield industry.

== Mixed martial arts career ==
=== Early career ===
Without any real training besides his karate background, Boser made his professional mixed martial arts debut in 2012. After the victory in his debut, Boser started training Brazilian jiu-jitsu for his sophomore bout which he won via recently learned submission skills.

In 2013 he moved to Edmonton, Alberta to pursue his mixed martial arts career while working as a bouncer for six years. After scraping by financially for a while in 2016, Boser decided to focus on other options and took an Emergency Medical Technician course with hopes of becoming a paramedic. However the hunger to compete would bring him back to training MMA full time, leading to Boser traveling around the world competing in 9 different countries.

Over the next seven years, he earned a respectable record of 16–5–1. During this time he became a two-time Unified MMA Heavyweight Champion and defending the belt three times. and has also fought around the world. Promotions such as fighting for Absolute Championship Akhmat and M-1 Global has taken him to Kazakhstan, Russia, United Arab Emirates, England and Australia. Having previously defended his Heavyweight Championship for the third time, when Boser was offered to sign with the Ultimate Fighting Championship in 2019.

=== Ultimate Fighting Championship ===
In his debut, Boser was set to face Brazilian competitor Giacomo Lemos on July 27, 2019, at UFC 240 in Edmonton, Alberta. However his debut would be delayed as his opponent tested positive for a banned substance and the fight was called off due to a ruling from the United States Anti-Doping Agency.

Boser's debut eventually took place on October 18, 2019, at UFC on ESPN 6 against Daniel Spitz. He won the bout via unanimous decision earning him his first victory in the promotion.

Boser next faced Ciryl Gane on December 21, 2019, at UFC Fight Night 165. He lost the fight via unanimous decision.

Boser was scheduled to face Jeff Hughes on March 28, 2020, at UFC on ESPN: Ngannou vs. Rozenstruik. However, the event was cancelled due to the COVID-19 pandemic.

Returning to action amidst the COVID-19 pandemic, Boser faced Philipe Lins at UFC on ESPN: Poirier vs. Hooker on June 27, 2020. He won the fight via knockout in the first round. This win earned him the Performance of the Night award.

As the first fight of his new four-fight contract, Boser next faced Raphael Pessoa at UFC on ESPN: Whittaker vs. Till on July 26, 2020. Boser won the fight via technical knockout in round two. This win earned him the Performance of the Night award.

Boser was expected to face Andrei Arlovski on October 4, 2020 at UFC on ESPN: Holm vs. Aldana. However a sickness with Arlovski pushed the bout to UFC on ESPN: Santos vs. Teixeira. Boser lost the fight via unanimous decision.

Boser faced Ilir Latifi on June 5, 2021, at UFC Fight Night: Rozenstruik vs. Sakai. He lost the fight via split decision.

As the first fight of his new, four-fight contract Boser faced Ovince Saint Preux on June 26, 2021, at UFC Fight Night 190. He won the fight via knockout in the second round.

Boser was scheduled to face Sergei Pavlovich on December 4, 2021, at UFC on ESPN 31. However, due to travel issues, the bout was scrapped.

Boser was scheduled to face Rodrigo Nascimento on April 23, 2022, at UFC Fight Night 205. However, Nascimento withdrew from the event for unknown reasons, and he was replaced by Alexander Romanov. In turn Boser was out of the fight due to an injury. He was replaced by Chase Sherman.

Boser was rebooked against Rodrigo Nascimento for September 17, 2022 at UFC Fight Night: Sandhagen vs. Song. Boser lost the fight via split decision.

Boser faced Ion Cuțelaba in a light heavyweight contest on April 15, 2023, at UFC on ESPN 44. He lost the fight via first-round technical knockout.

As the last fight of his prevailing contract, Boser faced Aleksa Camur on August 5, 2023, at UFC Fight Night 225. He won the fight by unanimous decision. Following the victory, Boser became a free agent.

==== Global Fight League ====
On December 11, 2024, it was announced that Boser was signed by Global Fight League. However, in April 2025, it was reported that all GFL events were cancelled indefinitely.

=== Return to the UFC ===
After competing at an independent promotion, Boser made his return to the UFC against Gökhan Saricam on April 18, 2026, at UFC Fight Night 273. He lost the fight by technical knockout in the second round.

Boser faced Jhonata Diniz on October 17, 2026, at UFC Fight Night 291. He won the fight by technical knockout in the third round.

After facing Diniz, Boser has a 100 percent take down percentage in the UFC.

== Championships and accomplishments ==
- Ultimate Fighting Championship*
  - Performance of the Night (One time) vs. Raphael Pessoa
- Unified MMA
  - Unified MMA Heavyweight Champion (two times, three defenses) vs. Tony Lopez, Joey Yager, Rakim Cleveland and Jared Kilkenny

== Mixed martial arts record ==
Professional record breakdown
| 35 matches | 23 wins | 11 losses |
| By knockout | 13 | 3 |
| By submission | 2 | 0 |
| By decision | 8 | 8 |
| Draws | 1 | |

| Res. | Record | Opponent | Method | Event | Date | Round | Time | Location | Notes |
|---|---|---|---|---|---|---|---|---|---|
| Win | 23–11–1 | Jhonata Diniz | TKO (punches) | UFC Fight Night: Buckley vs. Malott | October 17, 2026 | 3 | 4:26 | Edmonton, Alberta, Canada | |
| Loss | 22–11–1 | Gökhan Saricam | TKO (punches) | UFC Fight Night: Burns vs. Malott | April 18, 2026 | 2 | 4:43 | Winnipeg, Manitoba, Canada | |
| Win | 22–10–1 | Vinicius Moreira | TKO (retirement) | UAE Warriors 60 | June 13, 2025 | 3 | 1:55 | Abu Dhabi, United Arab Emirates | Return to Heavyweight. |
| Win | 21–10–1 | Aleksa Camur | Decision (unanimous) | UFC on ESPN: Sandhagen vs. Font | August 5, 2023 | 3 | 5:00 | Nashville, Tennessee, United States | |
| Loss | 20–10–1 | Ion Cuțelaba | TKO (punches) | UFC on ESPN: Holloway vs. Allen | April 15, 2023 | 1 | 2:05 | Kansas City, Missouri, United States | Return to Light Heavyweight. |
| Loss | 20–9–1 | Rodrigo Nascimento | Decision (split) | UFC Fight Night: Sandhagen vs. Song | September 17, 2022 | 3 | 5:00 | Las Vegas, Nevada, United States | |
| Win | 20–8–1 | Ovince Saint Preux | KO (punches) | UFC Fight Night: Gane vs. Volkov | June 26, 2021 | 2 | 2:31 | Las Vegas, Nevada, United States | |
| Loss | 19–8–1 | Ilir Latifi | Decision (split) | UFC Fight Night: Rozenstruik vs. Sakai | June 5, 2021 | 3 | 5:00 | Las Vegas, Nevada, United States | |
| Loss | 19–7–1 | Andrei Arlovski | Decision (unanimous) | UFC on ESPN: Santos vs. Teixeira | November 7, 2020 | 3 | 5:00 | Las Vegas, Nevada, United States | |
| Win | 19–6–1 | Raphael Pessoa | TKO (punches) | UFC on ESPN: Whittaker vs. Till | July 26, 2020 | 2 | 2:36 | Abu Dhabi, United Arab Emirates | Performance of the Night. |
| Win | 18–6–1 | Philipe Lins | KO (punches) | UFC on ESPN: Poirier vs. Hooker | June 27, 2020 | 1 | 2:41 | Las Vegas, Nevada, United States | |
| Loss | 17–6–1 | Ciryl Gane | Decision (unanimous) | UFC Fight Night: Edgar vs. The Korean Zombie | December 21, 2019 | 3 | 5:00 | Busan, South Korea | |
| Win | 17–5–1 | Daniel Spitz | Decision (unanimous) | UFC on ESPN: Reyes vs. Weidman | October 18, 2019 | 3 | 5:00 | Boston, Massachusetts, United States | |
| Win | 16–5–1 | Jared Kilkenny | TKO (leg kicks) | Unified MMA 37 | May 24, 2019 | 4 | 2:17 | Enoch, Alberta, Canada | Defended the Unified MMA Heavyweight Championship. |
| Draw | 15–5–1 | Zaur Gadzhibabayev | Draw (majority) | M-1 Challenge 101 | March 8, 2019 | 3 | 5:00 | Almaty, Kazakhstan | |
| Loss | 15–5 | Salimgerey Rasulov | Decision (unanimous) | ACB 90 | November 10, 2018 | 3 | 5:00 | Moscow, Russia | |
| Win | 15–4 | Chase Gormley | Decision (unanimous) | ACB 88 | June 16, 2018 | 3 | 5:00 | Brisbane, Australia | |
| Win | 14–4 | DJ Linderman | Decision (unanimous) | ACB 81 | February 28, 2018 | 3 | 5:00 | Dubai, United Arab Emirates | |
| Win | 13–4 | Dave Cryer | KO (punches) | ACB 72 | September 14, 2017 | 2 | 4:19 | Montreal, Quebec, Canada | |
| Loss | 12–4 | Denis Smoldarev | Decision (unanimous) | ACB 61 | May 20, 2017 | 3 | 5:00 | Saint Petersburg, Russia | |
| Loss | 12–3 | Mukhamad Vakhaev | Decision (split) | ACB 54 | March 11, 2017 | 3 | 5:00 | Manchester, England | |
| Win | 12–2 | Rakim Cleveland | Decision (unanimous) | Unified MMA 29 | December 16, 2016 | 3 | 5:00 | Edmonton, Alberta, Canada | Defended the Unified MMA Heavyweight Championship. |
| Win | 11–2 | Joey Yager | Decision (unanimous) | Unified MMA 28 | September 30, 2016 | 5 | 5:00 | Edmonton, Alberta, Canada | Defended the Unified MMA Heavyweight Championship. |
| Win | 10–2 | Tony Lopez | Decision (unanimous) | Unified MMA 27 | June 3, 2016 | 3 | 5:00 | Montreal, Quebec, Canada | Won the Unified MMA Heavyweight Championship. |
| Loss | 9–2 | Kazbek Saidaliev | Decision (unanimous) | Akhmat Fight Show 18 | April 9, 2016 | 3 | 5:00 | Grozny, Russia | |
| Win | 9–1 | Tim Hague | KO (elbows) | Unified MMA 26 | February 4, 2016 | 2 | 2:30 | Edmonton, Alberta, Canada | |
| Win | 8–1 | Victor Valimaki | TKO (leg kicks) | Unified MMA 24 | September 25, 2015 | 2 | 3:33 | Edmonton, Alberta, Canada | |
| Win | 7–1 | Jared Henderson | TKO (elbows) | KOTC: Mach 3 | June 12, 2015 | 1 | 3:54 | Edmonton, Alberta, Canada | |
| Loss | 6–1 | Tim Hague | KO (punches) | Unified MMA 22 | March 27, 2015 | 1 | 0:06 | Edmonton, Alberta, Canada | Lost the Unified MMA Heavyweight Championship. |
| Win | 6–0 | Jordan Tracey | TKO (punches) | Unified MMA 20 | September 26, 2014 | 3 | 2:39 | Edmonton, Alberta, Canada | Return to Heavyweight. Won the vacant Unified MMA Heavyweight Championship. |
| Win | 5–0 | Nick Campbell | Submission (rear-naked choke) | Unified MMA 18 | March 28, 2014 | 2 | 3:33 | Edmonton, Alberta, Canada | Light Heavyweight debut. |
| Win | 4–0 | William Carriere | Decision (unanimous) | Xcessive Force FC 3 | December 14, 2013 | 3 | 5:00 | Grande Prairie, Alberta, Canada | Catchweight (215 lb) bout. |
| Win | 3–0 | Matthew Swimmer | TKO (punches) | KOTC: Anger Therapy | September 25, 2013 | 1 | 2:32 | Edmonton, Alberta, Canada | |
| Win | 2–0 | Dell Knebush | Submission (rear-naked choke) | Unified MMA 16 | June 21, 2013 | 1 | 3:03 | Edmonton, Alberta, Canada | |
| Win | 1–0 | Mike Cobey | TKO (punches) | Unified MMA 13 | September 5, 2012 | 3 | 3:44 | Edmonton, Alberta, Canada | Heavyweight debut. |

== See also ==
- List of Canadian UFC fighters
- List of male mixed martial artists
