= UFC on ESPN: Vera vs. Sandhagen =

Mixed martial arts event in 2023

- The poster for UFC on ESPN: Vera vs. Sandhagen
- Promotion: Ultimate Fighting Championship
- Date: March 25, 2023
- Venue: AT&T Center
- City: San Antonio, Texas, United States
- Attendance: 16,076
- Total gate: $2,150,000

Event chronology
UFC 286: Edwards vs. Usman 3	UFC on ESPN: Vera vs. Sandhagen	UFC 287: Pereira vs. Adesanya 2

UFC on ESPN: Vera vs. Sandhagen (also known as UFC on ESPN 43) was a mixed martial arts event produced by the Ultimate Fighting Championship that took place on March 25, 2023, at the AT&T Center in San Antonio, Texas, United States.

== Background ==
The event marked the promotion's third visit to San Antonio and first since UFC on ESPN: dos Anjos vs. Edwards in July 2019.

A bantamweight bout between Marlon Vera and former interim UFC Bantamweight Championship challenger Cory Sandhagen headlined the event. They were previously expected to headline UFC Fight Night: Andrade vs. Blanchfield, but were rescheduled to this event for unknown reasons.

Although it was not announced by the promotion, a rematch between Irene Aldana and former UFC Women's Bantamweight Championship challenger Raquel Pennington was originally rumored to headline this event. The pair previously met at UFC on ESPN: dos Anjos vs. Edwards, where Pennington won by a split decision. However, the bout never materialized.

Sean Brady and Michel Pereira were expected to meet in a welterweight bout. However, Brady pulled out in mid-February due to a torn groin and the bout was scrapped.

A featherweight bout between Alex Caceres and Nate Landwehr was expected to take place at the event. However, Caceres withdrew due to an undisclosed reason and was replaced by Austin Lingo.

Liang Na and Brogan Walker-Sanchez were expected to meet in a women's flyweight bout. However, Liang pulled out due to undisclosed reasons and Walker-Sanchez was moved to UFC Fight Night: Pavlovich vs. Blaydes a month later as a replacement against Iasmin Lucindo.

Tamires Vidal was expected to face Hailey Cowan in a women's bantamweight bout at the event. However, Vidal pulled out due to undisclosed medical reasons and the pairing was scrapped.

A lightweight bout between Manuel Torres and Trey Ogden was expected to take place at the event, but it was cancelled the day before due to Torres suffering a medical issue.

Former UFC Flyweight Championship challenger Alex Perez and former Rizin Bantamweight Champion Manel Kape were expected to meet on the main card. However, the pairing was cancelled during the broadcast as Perez suffered a seizure backstage.

During the event's broadcast, former UFC Lightweight Championship challenger Donald Cerrone was announced as the next "modern wing" UFC Hall of Fame inductee.

== Results ==
Main card (ESPN / ESPN+)
Weight class				Method	Round	Time	Notes
Bantamweight	Cory Sandhagen	def.	Marlon Vera	Decision (split) (47–48, 50–45, 49–46)	5	5:00
Women's Bantamweight	Holly Holm	def.	Yana Santos	Decision (unanimous) (30–26, 30–27, 30–27)	3	5:00
Featherweight	Nate Landwehr	def.	Austin Lingo	Submission (rear-naked choke)	2	4:11
Women's Flyweight	Maycee Barber	def.	Andrea Lee	Decision (split) (28–29, 29–28, 30–27)	3	5:00
Middleweight	Albert Duraev	def.	Chidi Njokuani	Decision (split) (28–29, 29–28, 29–28)	3	5:00
Featherweight	Daniel Pineda	def.	Tucker Lutz	Submission (guillotine choke)	2	2:50
Preliminary card (ESPN / ESPN+)
Featherweight	Lucas Alexander	def.	Steven Peterson	Decision (unanimous) (30–27, 30–27, 30–27)	3	5:00
Welterweight	Trevin Giles	def.	Preston Parsons	Decision (split) (29–28, 28–29, 29–28)	3	5:00
Flyweight	C.J. Vergara	def.	Daniel da Silva	TKO (punches)	2	4:04
Flyweight	Victor Altamirano	def.	Vinicius Salvador	Decision (unanimous) (29–28, 29–28, 29–28)	3	5:00

== Bonus awards ==
The following fighters received $50,000 bonuses.

- Fight of the Night: C.J. Vergara vs. Daniel da Silva
- Performance of the Night: Nate Landwehr and Daniel Pineda

== See also ==
- List of UFC events
- List of current UFC fighters
- 2023 in UFC
