= Luis Saldaña =

American mixed martial arts fighter

- Born: January 27, 1991 (age 35); Des Moines, Iowa, U.S.
- Height: 5 ft 11 in (180 cm)
- Weight: 145 lb (66 kg; 10 st 5 lb)
- Division: Featherweight
- Reach: 73 in (185 cm)
- Fighting out of: Phoenix, Arizona
- Team: Fight Ready
- Years active: 2011–present

Mixed martial arts record
- Total: 26
- Wins: 18
- By knockout: 10
- By submission: 6
- By decision: 2
- Losses: 7
- By knockout: 1
- By submission: 2
- By decision: 4
- Draws: 1

Other information
- Mixed martial arts record from Sherdog

Luis Saldaña (born January 27, 1991) is an American mixed martial artist who competed in the Featherweight division of the Ultimate Fighting Championship.

== Background ==
Having his first boxing match at eight years old, he was introduced to the sport by his father. He the Iowa Silver Gloves three times and the 2009 Iowa Golden Gloves.

== Mixed martial arts career ==
=== Early career ===
Saldaña compiled a 14–6 record on the regional scene, with some highlights being capturing the Ascendancy FC Featherweight Title after knocking out Will Shutt with a high kick in the first round and winning the TFS Featherweight title vagainst Ramiro Hernandez via doctor stoppage. His regional career culminated in a rear-naked choke victory in the second round against Carl Wittstock at LFA 60.

Saldaña was invited to compete at Dana White's Contender Series 34 against Vince Murdock on November 4, 2020. He won the bout via third-round technical knockout and was awarded a contract with the UFC.

=== Ultimate Fighting Championship ===
Saldaña made his debut against Jordan Griffin on April 10, 2021 at UFC on ABC 2. He won the bout via controversial unanimous decision. 16 out of 18 media scores gave it to Griffin.

In his sophomore performance, Saldaña faced Austin Lingo on August 21, 2021 at UFC on ESPN: Cannonier vs. Gastelum. He lost the fight via unanimous decision.

Saldaña faced Bruno Souza on March 26, 2022 at UFC on ESPN 33. He won the fight by unanimous decision.

Saldaña faced Sean Woodson on August 20, 2022 at UFC 278. The bout was scored a split draw.

On March 13, 2024, it was announced that Saldana was released from the UFC.

== Championships and accomplishments ==
- Ascendancy FC
  - Ascendancy FC Featherweight Championship (One time)
    - Two successful title defenses
- The Fight Series
  - TFS Featherweight Championship (One time)

== Mixed martial arts record ==
Professional record breakdown
26 matches	18 wins	7 losses
By knockout	10	1
By submission	6	2
By decision	2	4
Draws	1	

Res.	Record	Opponent	Method	Event	Date	Round	Time	Location	Notes
Win	18–7–1	Edward Massey	TKO (knee and punches)	Absolute Combat League 5	October 26, 2024	2	3:38	Ankeny, Iowa, United States	
Win	17–7–1	Luis Guillen	Submission (triangle choke)	Absolute Combat League 3	May 11, 2024	2	4:25	Des Moines, Iowa, United States	
Draw	16–7–1	Sean Woodson	Draw (split)	UFC 278	August 20, 2022	3	5:00	Salt Lake City, Utah, United States	Saldaña was deducted one point in round 1 due to an illegal knee.
Win	16–7	Bruno Souza	Decision (unanimous)	UFC on ESPN: Blaydes vs. Daukaus	March 26, 2022	3	5:00	Columbus, Ohio, United States	
Loss	15–7	Austin Lingo	Decision (unanimous)	UFC on ESPN: Cannonier vs. Gastelum	August 21, 2021	3	5:00	Las Vegas, Nevada, United States	
Win	15–6	Jordan Griffin	Decision (unanimous)	UFC on ABC: Vettori vs. Holland	April 10, 2021	3	5:00	Las Vegas, Nevada, United States	
Win	14–6	Vince Murdock	TKO (punches)	Dana White's Contender Series 34	November 4, 2020	3	0:44	Las Vegas, Nevada, United States	
Win	13–6	Carl Wittstock	Technical Submission (rear-naked choke)	LFA 60	February 15, 2019	2	4:38	Clive, Iowa, United States	
Win	12–6	Ramiro Hernandez	TKO (doctor stoppage)	The Fight Series	May 18, 2018	2	5:00	West Des Moines, Iowa, United States	Won the TFS Featherweight Championship.
Win	11–6	Will Shutt	TKO (head kick)	Ascendancy FC 16	March 24, 2018	1	3:33	Clive, Iowa, United States	Defended the Ascendancy FC Featherweight Championship.
Loss	10–6	Alex Wiggs Jr.	Decision (unanimous)	Brutaal Genesis Iowa: Fight Night at Hy-Vee Hall	July 28, 2017	3	5:00	Des Moines, Iowa, United States	
Loss	10–5	Mike Santiago	TKO (punches)	RFA 39	June 17, 2016	3	2:27	Hammond, Indiana, United States	
Win	10–4	Chris Mickle	TKO (retirement)	Ascendancy FC 9	April 29, 2016	1	1:07	Clive, Iowa, United States	Defended the Ascendancy FC Featherweight Championship.
Win	9–4	Dyllon Muniz	KO (punch)	Ascendancy FC 8	February 13, 2016	1	0:53	Clive, Iowa, United States	Won the Ascendancy FC Featherweight Championship.
Loss	8–4	Anthony Baccam	Submission (rear-naked choke)	MCC 61	November 25, 2015	3	1:31	Des Moines, Iowa, United States	Return to Featherweight.
Loss	8–3	Damien Childress	Decision (unanimous)	Pinnacle Combat 17	October 4, 2014	3	5:00	Cedar Rapids, Iowa, United States	
Win	8–2	Sekou Moore	Submission (triangle choke)	MCC 52	March 7, 2014	2	2:34	Des Moines, Iowa, United States	
Loss	7–2	Justin Lawrence	Decision (unanimous)	RFA 10	October 25, 2013	3	5:00	Des Moines, Iowa, United States	Featherweight bout.
Win	7–1	Prentiss Wolf	TKO (submission to punches)	MCC 48	June 14, 2013	1	1:51	Des Moines, Iowa, United States	Lightweight debut.
Win	6–1	Mitch Parker	Submission (triangle choke)	MCC 47	April 12, 2013	1	3:15	Des Moines, Iowa, United States	
Win	5–1	Nic Cox	TKO (submission to punches)	MCC 45	January 25, 2013	1	0:50	Des Moines, Iowa, United States	
Loss	4–1	Tom Ahrens	Submission (rear-naked choke)	MCC 41	June 16, 2012	1	2:18	Des Moines, Iowa, United States	
Win	4–0	Zakk Smith	TKO (punches)	MCC 38	January 27, 2012	3	4:15	Des Moines, Iowa, United States	
Win	3–0	Jose Colon	KO (punch)	MCC 36	September 23, 2011	2	3:58	Des Moines, Iowa, United States	
Win	2–0	Orlando Peace	Submission (rear-naked choke)	MCC 34	June 24, 2011	1	3:56	Des Moines, Iowa, United States	
Win	1–0	Daraughn Canada	Submission (armbar)	MCC 32	March 4, 2011	2	2:13	Des Moines, Iowa, United States	Featherweight debut.

== See also ==
- List of male mixed martial artists
