= Ilir Latifi =

Swedish-Albanian MMA Fighter

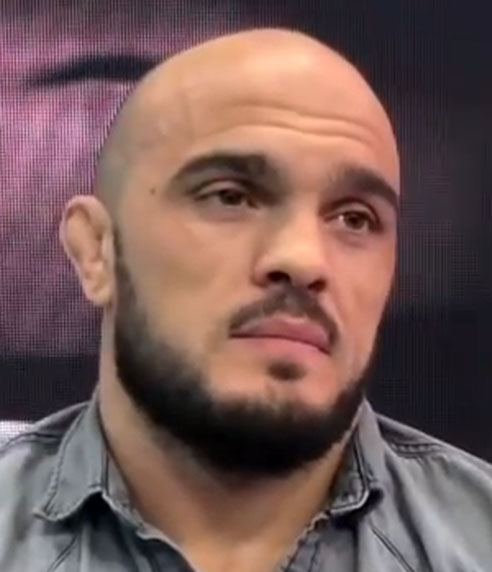
- Latifi at UFC 232 in 2018
- Born: July 28, 1983 (age 43); Malmö, Sweden
- Other names: The Sledgehammer
- Height: 5 ft 9 in (175 cm)
- Weight: 250 lb (113 kg; 17 st 12 lb)
- Division: Heavyweight (2008, 2020–present); Light Heavyweight (2009–2019)
- Reach: 73 1/2 in (187 cm)
- Style: Submission Wrestling
- Fighting out of: Stockholm, Sweden
- Team: Allstars Training Center; Pancrase Gym Sweden; American Top Team; Malmö Tigers (Wrestling)
- Trainer: Selman Berisha
- Wrestling: Swedish national level
- Years active: 2008–present

Mixed martial arts record
- Total: 26
- Wins: 16
- By knockout: 6
- By submission: 4
- By decision: 6
- Losses: 9
- By knockout: 4
- By decision: 5
- No contests: 1

Amateur record
- Total: 1
- Wins: 1
- By submission: 1

Other information
- Mixed martial arts record from Sherdog

Ilir Latifi (born July 28, 1983) is a Swedish-Albanian mixed martial artist who fights in the Heavyweight division, most recently in the Ultimate Fighting Championship. A two-time national wrestling champion and a professional MMA competitor since 2008, Latifi has also competed in Shark Fights, Rumble of The Kings, and GLORY.

== Mixed martial arts career ==
=== Background ===
With a considerable number of wrestlers in his family, Latifi began wrestling at a young age. Latifi continued to wrestle in order to pursue his dream of one day being world champion. In 2005, he began to follow in his older brother's footsteps by training MMA as a result of his dissatisfaction with the constant rule changes in wrestling. Latifi competed at the 2005 ADCC European trials, where his division was won by Alistair Overeem, but he did not earn a spot at the 2005 ADCC championships. Although Latifi did not compete at the 2009 ADCC European Trials, he was invited to the 2009 ADCC Championships, where he lost in the first round to Alexandre Ribeiro via points (2–0).

=== Early career ===
Latifi started his career as a heavyweight. His first professional MMA fight was on May 17, 2008, with the Real Pain Challenge promotion against future Bellator fighter and WSOF Heavyweight champion Blagoi Ivanov. However, the fight was ruled a no contest 55 seconds into the first round, as Latifi drove Ivanov into one of the posts on the ring and destroyed it.

Next he fought future UFC heavyweight Christian Colombo on September 6, 2008. The bout was first booked as a professional contest, but would later be changed to an amateur or semi-pro bout which is not listed on the fighters professional records. Latifi won the fight by submission due to a north–south choke in the first round. Back in professional competition Latifi had his last fight as a heavyweight, before dropping down to light heavyweight, on October 25, 2008, at Superior Challenge 2, where he defeated Roman Mihocka by knockout in the second round.

He holds a notable win over MMA- and kickboxing veteran Tony Lopez. Lopez came in to the fight on a 7-fight winning streak. Latifi used his superior wrestling and also his improved striking to shut Lopez down to win a unanimous decision. He has also fought against former Bellator Light Heavyweight champion and former MFC Light Heavyweight Champion Emanuel Newton and Tatsuya Mizuno. His early career success has led to Latifi being ranked as one of the top Light Heavyweights in Europe.

He became the first Superior Challenge Light Heavyweight Champion after defeating Jorge Oliveira for the vacant belt on October 6, 2012, at Superior Challenge 8.

=== Ultimate Fighting Championship ===
Latifi made his UFC debut against at the time #10 ranked, former Strikeforce Light Heavyweight Champion Gegard Mousasi on April 6, 2013, at UFC on Fuel TV 9, on four days notice, reportedly cutting weight from 105 kg (231 lbs) to 93.4 kg (206 lbs), replacing his injured training partner Alexander Gustafsson. Latifi lost the fight via unanimous decision. After the fight UFC President Dana White praised Latifi for taking a fight against a top 10 fighter like Mousasi on such short notice and promised that Latifi would get another fight in the promotion.

In his second fight for the promotion, Latifi fought MMA- and kickboxing veteran Cyrille Diabaté on March 8, 2014, at UFC Fight Night 37. Latifi won the fight via submission in the first round. His opponent, Diabaté retired from MMA and the UFC following his loss to Latifi.

Latifi was later expected to face Tom Lawlor on July 19, 2014, at UFC Fight Night 46. However, Lawlor later had to withdraw from the bout citing an injury, and was replaced by promotional newcomer Chris Dempsey. Latifi effectively used leg kicks to disable his opponent, before finishing him with punches, ending the fight via first-round knockout.

Latifi faced promotional newcomer Jan Błachowicz on October 4, 2014, at UFC Fight Night 53. He lost the fight via TKO in the first round.

Latifi next faced Hans Stringer on July 18, 2015, at UFC Fight Night 72. He won the fight by knockout after dropping Stringer with an overhand right and following up with punches on the ground, stopping the fight 56 seconds into the first round.

Latifi faced Sean O'Connell on January 17, 2016, at UFC Fight Night 81. He won the fight by knockout, having landed a vicious overhand right that wobbled O'Connell, followed by a right hook that dropped him to the canvas, 28 seconds into the first round. Following the fight, Latifi expressed his desire to fight in a main event in his hometown Malmö.

Latifi faced Gian Villante on March 5, 2016, at UFC 196. He won the fight via unanimous decision.

Latifi next faced Ryan Bader on September 3, 2016, at UFC Fight Night 93. He lost the fight via knockout in the second round.

Latifi was expected to face Antônio Rogério Nogueira on June 25, 2017, at UFC Fight Night 112. However, on May 17, it was announced that Nogueira pulled out due to a neck injury. Subsequently, despite having six weeks to secure a replacement opponent, promotion officials elected to remove Latifi from the event entirely.

Latifi faced undefeated prospect Tyson Pedro on September 9, 2017, at UFC 215. He won the fight via unanimous decision, handing Pedro the first loss of his career.

Latifi was expected to face Ovince Saint Preux on January 27, 2018, at UFC on Fox 27. However, he was injured during a training session and was forced to pull from the event, and the bout was cancelled. The pair was rebooked and took place on February 24, 2018, at UFC on Fox 28. Latifi won the fight via submission in the first round. This win earned him the Performance of the Night bonus.

Latifi was expected to face Glover Teixeira on July 22, 2018, at UFC Fight Night 134. However, on July 5, 2018, it was announced that he was pulled from the event, citing injury.

Latifi faced Corey Anderson on December 29, 2018, at UFC 232. He lost the fight via unanimous decision.

Latifi was expected to face Volkan Oezdemir on June 1, 2019, at UFC Fight Night 153. On May 30, 2019, it was reported that Latifi was forced to pull out of the event due to back injury and the bout was cancelled. The pair was rebooked at UFC on ESPN 5 on August 3, 2019. In turn, due to Oezdemir having visa issues to enter United States, the bout was moved to August 10, 2019, at UFC Fight Night 156. He lost the fight via knockout in the second round.

==== Move up to heavyweight ====
On October 14, 2019, news surfaced that Latifi will be moving up to heavyweight division.

Latifi faced Derrick Lewis on February 8, 2020, at UFC 247. He lost the fight via unanimous decision.

Latifi faced Tanner Boser on June 5, 2021, at UFC Fight Night: Rozenstruik vs. Sakai. He won the fight via split decision.

Latifi was next expected to face Alexander Romanov at UFC Fight Night 202 on February 19, 2022. However, the bout was cancelled for undisclosed reasons.

Latifi was scheduled to face Alexey Oleynik on March 26, 2022, at UFC Fight Night 205. However, the day of the event, Latifi withdrew due to illness and the bout was cancelled. The pair was rescheduled to meet on two weeks later at UFC 273 on April 9, 2022. In turn, Latifi withdrew again for unknown reasons and was replaced by Jared Vanderaa. The pair was yet again rescheduled for UFC Fight Night 211 on October 1, 2022. Latifi won the bout via unanimous decision. In the post-fight interview he said that, having reached the age of 40 and the end of his UFC contract, he was unsure of his future in the sport, and that it might have been his last fight. In the same interview he revealed fighting with possible staph infection which he didn't disclose to the athletic commission and was later suspended for three months, making him eligible to return on January 1, 2023.

Latifi faced Rodrigo Nascimento on May 20, 2023, at UFC Fight Night 223. He lost the fight via split decision.

After the loss, Latifi completed his UFC contract and was not re-signed.

==== Global Fight League ====
On December 11, 2024, it was announced that Latifi was signed by Global Fight League.

== Personal life ==
Of Albanian origin, Latifi's parents emigrated from Kosovo in the 1960s. Latifi was raised in Rosengård, where he befriended football player Zlatan Ibrahimović. His brother Arben, who Ilir has described as his greatest influence in life, is a black belt in Brazilian jiu-jitsu and was one of the pioneers of Swedish MMA in the early days, winning both the championship in European Open BJJ and the Panamerican Championship during his active career.

In 2016, Latifi was awarded role model of the year and received the most votes for the people's choice award in the annual Swedish martial arts awards ceremony Kampsportsgalan.

== Championships and accomplishments ==
=== Mixed martial arts ===
- Ultimate Fighting Championship
  - Performance of the Night (One time) vs. Ovince Saint Preux
  - Tied (Anthony Johnson & Volkan Oezdemir) for most Light Heavyweight stoppage victories in less than one minute in UFC history (2)
  - UFC.com Awards
    - 2018: Ranked #7 Submission of the Year vs. Ovince Saint Preux
- Superior Challenge
  - Superior Challenge Light Heavyweight Championship (One time; First)

=== Submission wrestling ===
- Abu Dhabi Combat Club
  - 2003 ADCC European Championships (gold)
  - 2004 ADCC European Qualifiers Winner

=== Amateur wrestling ===
- Nordic Wrestling Association
  - 2001 Nordic Championship Junior -97 kg (213 lbs) Greco-Roman Championship (gold)
- Swedish Wrestling Federation
  - 2005 Swedish National Light Heavyweight Greco-Roman Championship (bronze)

== Mixed martial arts record ==
Professional record breakdown
26 matches	16 wins	9 losses
By knockout	6	4
By submission	4	0
By decision	6	5
No contests	1	

Res.	Record	Opponent	Method	Event	Date	Round	Time	Location	Notes
Loss	16–9 (1)	Rodrigo Nascimento	Decision (split)	UFC Fight Night: Dern vs. Hill	May 20, 2023	3	5:00	Las Vegas, Nevada, United States	
Win	16–8 (1)	Aleksei Oleinik	Decision (unanimous)	UFC Fight Night: Dern vs. Yan	October 1, 2022	3	5:00	Las Vegas, Nevada, United States	
Win	15–8 (1)	Tanner Boser	Decision (split)	UFC Fight Night: Rozenstruik vs. Sakai	June 5, 2021	3	5:00	Las Vegas, Nevada, United States	
Loss	14–8 (1)	Derrick Lewis	Decision (unanimous)	UFC 247	February 8, 2020	3	5:00	Houston, Texas, United States	Return to Heavyweight.
Loss	14–7 (1)	Volkan Oezdemir	KO (punches)	UFC Fight Night: Shevchenko vs. Carmouche 2	August 10, 2019	2	4:31	Montevideo, Uruguay	
Loss	14–6 (1)	Corey Anderson	Decision (unanimous)	UFC 232	December 29, 2018	3	5:00	Inglewood, California, United States	
Win	14–5 (1)	Ovince Saint Preux	Technical Submission (guillotine choke)	UFC on Fox: Emmett vs. Stephens	February 24, 2018	1	3:48	Orlando, Florida, United States	Performance of the Night.
Win	13–5 (1)	Tyson Pedro	Decision (unanimous)	UFC 215	September 9, 2017	3	5:00	Edmonton, Alberta, Canada	
Loss	12–5 (1)	Ryan Bader	KO (knee)	UFC Fight Night: Arlovski vs. Barnett	September 3, 2016	2	2:06	Hamburg, Germany	
Win	12–4 (1)	Gian Villante	Decision (unanimous)	UFC 196	March 5, 2016	3	5:00	Las Vegas, Nevada, United States	
Win	11–4 (1)	Sean O'Connell	KO (punch)	UFC Fight Night: Dillashaw vs. Cruz	January 17, 2016	1	0:30	Boston, Massachusetts, United States	
Win	10–4 (1)	Hans Stringer	KO (punches)	UFC Fight Night: Bisping vs. Leites	July 18, 2015	1	0:56	Glasgow, Scotland	
Loss	9–4 (1)	Jan Błachowicz	TKO (body kick and punches)	UFC Fight Night: Nelson vs. Story	October 4, 2014	1	1:58	Stockholm, Sweden	
Win	9–3 (1)	Chris Dempsey	KO (punches)	UFC Fight Night: McGregor vs. Brandao	July 19, 2014	1	2:07	Dublin, Ireland	
Win	8–3 (1)	Cyrille Diabaté	Submission (guillotine choke)	UFC Fight Night: Gustafsson vs. Manuwa	March 8, 2014	1	3:02	London, England	
Loss	7–3 (1)	Gegard Mousasi	Decision (unanimous)	UFC on Fuel TV: Mousasi vs. Latifi	April 6, 2013	3	5:00	Stockholm, Sweden	
Win	7–2 (1)	Jorge Oliveira	Decision (unanimous)	Superior Challenge 8	October 6, 2012	3	5:00	Malmö, Sweden	Won the SC Light Heavyweight Championship.
Win	6–2 (1)	Tony Lopez	Decision (unanimous)	Glory 1: Stockholm	May 26, 2012	3	5:00	Stockholm, Sweden	
Win	5–2 (1)	Denis Bogdanov	Submission (americana)	United Glory 15	March 23, 2012	1	0:51	Moscow, Russia	
Loss	4–2 (1)	Emanuel Newton	Decision (unanimous)	Shark Fights 17: Horwich vs. Rosholt 2	July 15, 2011	3	5:00	Frisco, Texas, United States	
Win	4–1 (1)	Matteo Minonzio	TKO (head kick)	Strength and Honor Championship 2	April 10, 2010	1	4:29	Geneva, Switzerland	
Loss	3–1 (1)	Tatsuya Mizuno	TKO (knee and punches)	Rumble of the Kings 4	November 20, 2009	3	0:15	Norrköping, Sweden	
Win	3–0 (1)	Darko Krbanjevic	Submission (armbar)	Rumble of the Kings 3	May 22, 2009	1	1:43	Malmö, Sweden	
Win	2–0 (1)	Luis Pinho	TKO (submission to punches)	Rumble of the Kings 2	February 27, 2009	1	1:20	Norrköping, Sweden	Light Heavyweight debut.
Win	1–0 (1)	Roman Mihocka	KO (punches)	Superior Challenge 2	October 25, 2008	2	1:55	Stockholm, Sweden	
NC	0–0 (1)	Blagoy Ivanov	NC (ring broke)	Real Pain Challenge 2	May 17, 2008	1	0:55	Sofia, Bulgaria	Heavyweight debut. Fight ruled a no contest due to faulty cage.

Res.	Record	Opponent	Method	Event	Date	Round	Time	Location	Notes
Win	1–0	Christian Colombo	Submission (north-south choke)	Adrenaline 3 - Evolution	September 6, 2008	1	2:33	Hvidovre, Denmark	Heavyweight bout; originally scheduled as a professional contest, later changed to an amateur bout

== See also ==
- List of male mixed martial artists
