= UFC on ESPN: Sandhagen vs. Font =

Mixed martial arts event in 2023

- The poster for UFC on ESPN: Sandhagen vs. Font
- Promotion: Ultimate Fighting Championship
- Date: August 5, 2023
- Venue: Bridgestone Arena
- City: Nashville, Tennessee, United States
- Attendance: 17,792
- Total gate: $2,102,127.12

Event chronology
UFC 291: Poirier vs. Gaethje 2	UFC on ESPN: Sandhagen vs. Font	UFC on ESPN: Luque vs. dos Anjos

UFC on ESPN: Sandhagen vs. Font (also known as UFC on ESPN 50) was a mixed martial arts event produced by the Ultimate Fighting Championship that took place on August 5, 2023 at Bridgestone Arena in Nashville, Tennessee, United States.

== Background ==
The event marked the promotion's sixth visit to Nashville and first since UFC Fight Night: Thompson vs. Pettis in March 2019.

A bantamweight bout between former interim UFC Bantamweight Championship challenger Cory Sandhagen and Umar Nurmagomedov was expected to headline the event. However, Nurmagomedov withdrew from the event in mid-July due to a shoulder injury. He was replaced by Rob Font in a catchweight bout of 140 pounds.

The Ultimate Fighter: Team Joanna vs. Team Cláudia women's strawweight winner Tatiana Suarez and Virna Jandiroba were scheduled to meet in a women's strawweight bout. However on June 20, it was announced that Jandiroba pulled out due to a knee injury and was replaced by former UFC Women's Strawweight Champion Jéssica Andrade.

Tagir Ulanbekov and Jake Hadley were expected to meet in a flyweight bout at this event. However, Ulanbekov withdrew due to undisclosed reasons and was replaced by Cody Durden.

A bantamweight bout between Said Nurmagomedov and Kyler Phillips was expected to take place at the event. However, Nurmagomedov withdrew for unknown reasons and was replaced by Raoni Barcelos.

A light heavyweight bout between Ovince Saint Preux and Ion Cuțelaba was expected to take place at the event. However, the bout was cancelled on July 20 for unknown reasons.

Sean Woodson and Steve Garcia were expected to meet in a featherweight bout at the event. However, the bout was scrapped after Garcia got injured and Woodson was booked against Jesse Butler. In turn, Butler was removed by the Nevada Athletic Commission during fight week due to a recent knockout loss two months earlier. He was replaced by promotional newcomer Mairon Santos. However, due to visa issues, Santos was removed from the bout and replaced with promotional newcomer Dennis Buzukja. At the weigh-ins, Buzukja weighed in at 146.5 pounds, half a pound over the featherweight non-title fight limit. The bout proceeded at catchweight and he was fined 20 percent of his purse, which went to Woodson.

== Results ==
Main card (ESPN / ESPN+)
Weight class				Method	Round	Time	Notes
Catchweight (140 lb)	Cory Sandhagen	def.	Rob Font	Decision (unanimous) (50–45, 50–45, 50–45)	5	5:00
Women's Strawweight	Tatiana Suarez	def.	Jéssica Andrade	Submission (guillotine choke)	2	1:31
Light Heavyweight	Dustin Jacoby	def.	Kennedy Nzechukwu	TKO (punches)	1	1:22
Featherweight	Diego Lopes	def.	Gavin Tucker	Submission (armbar)	1	1:38
Light Heavyweight	Tanner Boser	def.	Aleksa Camur	Decision (unanimous) (30–27, 30–27, 30–27)	3	5:00
Lightweight	Ľudovít Klein	def.	Ignacio Bahamondes	Decision (unanimous) (30–27, 29–28, 29–28)	3	5:00
Preliminary card (ESPN/ ESPN+)
Bantamweight	Kyler Phillips	def.	Raoni Barcelos	Decision (unanimous) (30–27, 29–28, 29–28)	3	5:00
Welterweight	Carlston Harris	def.	Jeremiah Wells	Technical Submission (anaconda choke)	3	1:50
Featherweight	Billy Quarantillo	def.	Damon Jackson	Decision (unanimous) (29–28, 29–28, 29–28)	3	5:00
Flyweight	Cody Durden	def.	Jake Hadley	Decision (unanimous) (30–27, 30–27, 30–27)	3	5:00
Catchweight (146.5 lb)	Sean Woodson	def.	Dennis Buzukja	Decision (unanimous) (30–27, 30–27, 30–27)	3	5:00
Flyweight	Asu Almabayev	def.	Ode' Osbourne	Submission (rear-naked choke)	2	3:11

== Bonus awards ==
The following fighters received $50,000 bonuses.

- Fight of the Night: No bonus awarded.
- Performance of the Night: Tatiana Suarez, Dustin Jacoby, Diego Lopes, Carlston Harris, and Asu Almabayev

== See also ==
- List of UFC events
- List of current UFC fighters
- 2023 in UFC
