= UFC Fight Night: Rozenstruik vs. Sakai =

Mixed martial arts event in 2021

- The poster for UFC Fight Night: Rozenstruik vs. Sakai
- Promotion: Ultimate Fighting Championship
- Date: June 5, 2021
- Venue: UFC Apex
- City: Enterprise, Nevada, United States
- Attendance: None (behind closed doors)

Event chronology
UFC Fight Night: Font vs. Garbrandt	UFC Fight Night: Rozenstruik vs. Sakai	UFC 263: Adesanya vs. Vettori 2

UFC Fight Night: Rozenstruik vs. Sakai (also known as UFC Fight Night 189, UFC on ESPN+ 47 and UFC Vegas 28) was a mixed martial arts event produced by the Ultimate Fighting Championship that took place on June 5, 2021 UFC Apex facility in Enterprise, Nevada, part of the Las Vegas Metropolitan Area, United States.

== Background ==
A heavyweight bout between Jairzinho Rozenstruik and Augusto Sakai served as the event's headliner.

A women's strawweight bout between Amanda Ribas and former Invicta FC Strawweight Champion Angela Hill was originally expected to take place at UFC on ESPN: Rodriguez vs. Waterson, but it was postponed due to Ribas testing positive for COVID-19. They were then expected to meet at this event. Two weeks later, the pairing was scrapped once again as Ribas was still suffering from lingering COVID-19 symptoms.

Alessio Di Chirico was expected to face Roman Dolidze in a middleweight bout at the event. However, Di Chirico pulled out of the contest in mid-May due to an injury. He was replaced by Laureano Staropoli.

A middleweight bout between Duško Todorović and Maki Pitolo was expected to take place at this event. However, Pitolo pulled out due to an injury. Todorović faced promotional newcomer Gregory Rodrigues instead.

Nate Landwehr and Makwan Amirkhani were expected to meet in a featherweight contest. Due to an injury, Landwehr pulled out of the bout and was replaced promotional newcomer by Kamuela Kirk.

Maryna Moroz and Manon Fiorot were expected to meet in the women's flyweight division. However, Moroz withdrew from the event due to undisclosed reasons and was replaced by newcomer Tabatha Ricci.

A middleweight bout between Tom Breese and Antônio Arroyo was expected to open the main card, but it was cancelled just before taking place as Breese was dealing with undisclosed medical issues.

== Results ==
Main card (ESPN+)
Weight class				Method	Round	Time	Notes
Heavyweight	Jairzinho Rozenstruik	def.	Augusto Sakai	TKO (punches)	1	4:59
Heavyweight	Marcin Tybura	def.	Walt Harris	TKO (punches)	1	4:06
Middleweight	Roman Dolidze	def.	Laureano Staropoli	Decision (unanimous) (30–27, 30–27, 30–27)	3	5:00
Welterweight	Santiago Ponzinibbio	def.	Miguel Baeza	Decision (unanimous) (29–28, 29–28, 29–28)	3	5:00
Middleweight	Gregory Rodrigues	def.	Duško Todorović	Decision (unanimous) (30–27, 30–27, 29–28)	3	5:00
Women’s Flyweight	Montana De La Rosa	def.	Ariane Lipski	TKO (punches)	2	4:27
Preliminary card (ESPN+)
Heavyweight	Ilir Latifi	def.	Tanner Boser	Decision (split) (29–28, 27–29, 29–28)	3	5:00
Welterweight	Muslim Salikhov	def.	Francisco Trinaldo	Decision (unanimous) (30–27, 30–27, 30–27)	3	5:00
Featherweight	Kamuela Kirk	def.	Makwan Amirkhani	Decision (unanimous) (30–27, 29–28, 29–28)	3	5:00
Lightweight	Alan Patrick	vs.	Mason Jones	No Contest (accidental eye poke)	2	2:14	(Note: Accidental eye poke rendered Patrick unable to continue.)
Women’s Flyweight	Manon Fiorot	def.	Tabatha Ricci	TKO (punches)	2	3:00
Featherweight	Sean Woodson	def.	Youssef Zalal	Decision (split) (28–29, 29–28, 29–28)	3	5:00
Lightweight	Claudio Puelles	def.	Jordan Leavitt	Decision (unanimous) (29–28, 29–28, 29–28)	3	5:00

== Bonus awards ==
The following fighters received $50,000 bonuses.

- Fight of the Night: Santiago Ponzinibbio vs. Miguel Baeza
- Performance of the Night: Jairzinho Rozenstruik and Marcin Tybura

== See also ==
- List of UFC events
- List of current UFC fighters
- 2021 in UFC
