= Youssef Zalal =

Moroccan mixed martial artist (born 1996)

- Born: September 4, 1996 (age 30); Casablanca, Morocco
- Native name: يوسف زلال
- Other names: The Moroccan Devil
- Height: 5 ft 10 in (1.78 m)
- Weight: 145 lb (66 kg; 10 st 5 lb)
- Division: Bantamweight (2022); Featherweight (2017-2021, 2022-present); Lightweight (2017)
- Reach: 72 in (183 cm)
- Style: Kickboxing, Amateur MMA, Boxing
- Stance: Orthodox
- Fighting out of: Casablanca, Morocco Englewood, Colorado, U.S.
- Team: Factory X
- Rank: Black belt in Brazilian Jiu-Jitsu
- Years active: 2017–present

Professional boxing record
- Total: 1
- Wins: 1
- By knockout: 1
- Losses: 0

Kickboxing record
- Total: 1
- Wins: 1
- By knockout: 1
- Losses: 0

Mixed martial arts record
- Total: 25
- Wins: 18
- By knockout: 4
- By submission: 10
- By decision: 4
- Losses: 6
- By decision: 6
- Draws: 1

Amateur record
- Total: 5
- Wins: 4
- By knockout: 2
- By submission: 1
- By decision: 1
- Losses: 1
- By decision: 1

Other information
- Mixed martial arts record from Sherdog

Youssef Zalal; born September 4, 1996) is a Moroccan professional mixed martial artist who currently competes in the Featherweight division of the Ultimate Fighting Championship (UFC). As of November 7, 2026, he is #8 in the Meta UFC featherweight rankings.

== Early life ==
Zalal grew up fighting other kids on the streets of Morocco. To help control his anger, his mother enrolled him in kickboxing at the age of 10. He moved to the United States at age 15.

== Mixed martial arts career ==
=== Early career ===
In the beginning of his mixed martial arts career, Zalal fought primarily on the regional circuit in Colorado compiling a 7–2 record, with most of his fights happening for Legacy Fighting Alliance.

=== Ultimate Fighting Championship ===
In his promotional debut, Youssef faced fellow newcomer Austin Lingo on February 8, 2020, at UFC 247. He won the fight via unanimous decision.

Youssef faced Jordan Griffin on June 27, 2020, at UFC on ESPN: Poirier vs. Hooker. He won the fight via unanimous decision.

Zalal faced Peter Barrett at UFC Fight Night: Lewis vs. Oleinik on August 8, 2020. He won the fight via unanimous decision.

Zalal was expected to face Seung Woo Choi on October 11, 2020, at UFC Fight Night 179. However, on October 1, 2020, Choi withdrew from the fight and was replaced by Ilia Topuria. Zalal lost the fight via unanimous decision.

Zalal faced Seung Woo Choi, replacing Collin Anglin, on February 6, 2021, at UFC Fight Night 184. He lost the fight via unanimous decision.

Zalal faced Sean Woodson on June 5, 2021, at UFC Fight Night: Rozenstruik vs. Sakai. He lost the fight via split decision.

Zalal was scheduled to face Cristian Quiñonez on August 13, 2022, at UFC on ESPN: Vera vs. Cruz. However, Quiñonez was forced out of the event due to visa issues, and was replaced by Da'Mon Blackshear. The fight ended in a majority draw.

On August 25, 2022, it was announced that Zalal had been released from the UFC.

=== Post UFC career ===
Following his release from the UFC, Youssef Zalal made a strong comeback in the MMA circuit. He showcased his skills at Sparta 93 on November 18, 2022, where he triumphed over Edwin Chavez via TKO within the first round. Zalal continued his winning streak on January 20, 2023, at SCL: Fight Night 14 - King of Sparta Welterweight, defeating Jake Childers also by TKO in the first round. His remarkable run persisted as he secured another victory on August 19, 2023, at Sparta Combat League 98, submitting Vadim Zadnipryanyi with an arm-triangle choke in the first round.

=== Return to UFC ===
Zalal faced Billy Quarantillo, replacing Gabriel Miranda, on March 23, 2024, at UFC on ESPN 53. He won the bout by a rear-naked choke submission in the second round.

Zalal faced Jarno Errens on August 10, 2024, at UFC on ESPN 61. He won the fight via a rear-naked choke submission in the first round. This fight earned him a Performance of the Night award.

Zalal faced Jack Shore on November 2, 2024, at UFC Fight Night 246. He won the fight via an arm-triangle choke in the second round. This fight earned him another Performance of the Night award.

Zalal faced Calvin Kattar on February 15, 2025, at UFC Fight Night 251. He won the fight by unanimous decision.

Zalal faced former interim UFC Featherweight Championship challenger Josh Emmett on October 4, 2025, at UFC 320. He won the fight via an armbar submission in the first round.

Zalal faced former UFC Bantamweight Champion Aljamain Sterling on April 25, 2026, at UFC Fight Night 274. He lost the fight via unanimous decision.

== Championships and accomplishments ==
=== Mixed martial arts ===
- Ultimate Fighting Championship
  - Performance of the Night (Two times) vs. Jarno Errens and Jack Shore
  - Tied (Daniel Pineda, Chas Skelly, Makwan Amirkhani & Brian Ortega) for second most submissions in UFC Featherweight division history (4)
  - UFC.com Awards
    - 2020: Ranked #7 Newcomer of the Year
- Sherdog
  - 2024 Comeback Fighter of the Year
- MMA Fighting
  - 2024 Third Team MMA All-Star

== Mixed martial arts record ==
Professional record breakdown
25 matches	18 wins	6 losses
By knockout	4	0
By submission	10	0
By decision	4	6
Draws	1	

Res.	Record	Opponent	Method	Event	Date	Round	Time	Location	Notes
Loss	18–6–1	Aljamain Sterling	Decision (unanimous)	UFC Fight Night: Sterling vs. Zalal	April 25, 2026	5	5:00	Las Vegas, Nevada, United States	
Win	18–5–1	Josh Emmett	Submission (armbar)	UFC 320	October 4, 2025	1	1:38	Las Vegas, Nevada, United States	
Win	17–5–1	Calvin Kattar	Decision (unanimous)	UFC Fight Night: Cannonier vs. Rodrigues	February 15, 2025	3	5:00	Las Vegas, Nevada, United States	
Win	16–5–1	Jack Shore	Submission (arm-triangle choke)	UFC Fight Night: Moreno vs. Albazi	November 2, 2024	2	0:59	Edmonton, Alberta, Canada	Performance of the Night.
Win	15–5–1	Jarno Errens	Submission (rear-naked choke)	UFC on ESPN: Tybura vs. Spivac 2	August 10, 2024	1	3:52	Las Vegas, Nevada, United States	Performance of the Night.
Win	14–5–1	Billy Quarantillo	Submission (rear-naked choke)	UFC on ESPN: Ribas vs. Namajunas	March 23, 2024	2	1:50	Las Vegas, Nevada, United States	
Win	13–5–1	Vadim Zadnipryanyi	Submission (arm-triangle choke)	Sparta Combat League 98	August 19, 2023	1	3:48	Superior, Colorado, United States	Won the King of Sparta Featherweight Tournament.
Win	12–5–1	Jake Childers	TKO (punches)	Sparta Combat League: Fight Night 14	January 20, 2023	1	1:53	Aurora, Colorado, United States	
Win	11–5–1	Edwin Chavez	TKO (punches)	Sparta Combat League 93	November 18, 2022	1	3:44	Denver, Colorado, United States	Return to Featherweight; Chavez missed weight (147.6 lb).
Draw	10–5–1	Da'Mon Blackshear	Draw (majority)	UFC on ESPN: Vera vs. Cruz	August 13, 2022	3	5:00	San Diego, California, United States	Bantamweight debut.
Loss	10–5	Sean Woodson	Decision (split)	UFC Fight Night: Rozenstruik vs. Sakai	June 5, 2021	3	5:00	Las Vegas, Nevada, United States	
Loss	10–4	Choi Seung-woo	Decision (unanimous)	UFC Fight Night: Overeem vs. Volkov	February 6, 2021	3	5:00	Las Vegas, Nevada, United States	
Loss	10–3	Ilia Topuria	Decision (unanimous)	UFC Fight Night: Moraes vs. Sandhagen	October 11, 2020	3	5:00	Abu Dhabi, United Arab Emirates	
Win	10–2	Peter Barrett	Decision (unanimous)	UFC Fight Night: Lewis vs. Oleinik	August 8, 2020	3	5:00	Las Vegas, Nevada, United States	
Win	9–2	Jordan Griffin	Decision (unanimous)	UFC on ESPN: Poirier vs. Hooker	June 27, 2020	3	5:00	Las Vegas, Nevada, United States	
Win	8–2	Austin Lingo	Decision (unanimous)	UFC 247	February 8, 2020	3	5:00	Houston, Texas, United States	
Win	7–2	Jaime Hernandez	KO (flying knee)	LFA 79	November 22, 2019	1	2:15	Broomfield, Colorado, United States	Catchweight (140 lb) bout.
Loss	6–2	Matt Jones	Decision (split)	LFA 65	May 3, 2019	3	5:00	Vail, Colorado, United States	
Loss	6–1	Jose Mariscal	Decision (unanimous)	LFA 57	January 18, 2019	3	5:00	Broomfield, Colorado, United States	
Win	6–0	Steven Merrill	Submission (brabo choke)	LFA 56	December 7, 2018	1	3:22	Prior Lake, Minnesota, United States	
Win	5–0	Daniel Soto	Submission (rear-naked choke)	LFA 39	May 4, 2018	2	1:38	Vail, Colorado, United States	
Win	4–0	Joey Banks	Submission (armbar)	Paramount MMA: Contenders	March 16, 2018	3	1:58	Denver, Colorado, United States	
Win	3–0	Clay Wimer	Submission (guillotine choke)	Mile High MMAyhem 1	October 27, 2017	2	2:42	Glendale, Colorado, United States	Return to Featherweight.
Win	2–0	Maurice Salazar	TKO (punches)	LFA 22	September 8, 2017	2	4:41	Broomfield, Colorado, United States	Lightweight debut.
Win	1–0	Michael Santos	Submission (brabo choke)	Sparta Combat League 61	August 19, 2017	3	1:38	Denver, Colorado, United States	Featherweight debut.

== See also ==
- List of current UFC fighters
- List of male mixed martial artists
