= Sean Woodson =

American mixed martial artist (born 1992)

- Born: Sean Lawrence Woodson; June 7, 1992 (age 34); St. Louis, Missouri, U.S.
- Other names: The Sniper
- Height: 6 ft 2 in (1.88 m)
- Weight: 145 lb (66 kg; 10 st 5 lb)
- Division: Middleweight (2017); Lightweight (2017–2018); Featherweight (2017, 2019–present)
- Reach: 78 in (198 cm)
- Fighting out of: St. Louis, Missouri, U.S.
- Team: Glory MMA and Fitness Wolves' Den Training Center
- Rank: Blue belt in Brazilian Jiu-Jitsu
- Years active: 2016–present

Kickboxing record
- Total: 1
- Wins: 1
- Losses: 0

Mixed martial arts record
- Total: 17
- Wins: 14
- By knockout: 4
- By submission: 1
- By decision: 9
- Losses: 2
- By knockout: 1
- By submission: 1
- Draws: 1

Other information
- Mixed martial arts record from Sherdog

Sean Lawrence Woodson (born June 7, 1992) is an American mixed martial artist who currently competes in the Featherweight division of the Ultimate Fighting Championship.

== Background ==
Growing up in North County, Sean Woodson’s dad was the driving inspiration behind his fighting career as his father would watch fights with his son, developing a passion for boxing. His mother had other ideas and took Sean to a trip to the pediatrician at the age of eight, asking the doctor to explain the dangers of boxing. Instead the doctor told her that with headgear, boxing is actually safer than a lot of other sports like football or hockey. Sean's mother then took him to the gym where he fell in love with the sport. As an amateur boxer, he developed a record of 46-3. Following a serious car accident at age sixteen, he ended up living at Matt Hughes’ Hit Squad Gym in Granite City. There, he was introduced to mixed martial arts.

== Mixed martial arts career ==
=== Early career ===
Making his debut at RFA 44, Woodson faced Kevin Brown Jr. and went on to submit him in the first round. Competing under the banner of Shamrock FC, he would win his next four bouts, defeating Coltin Cole at Shamrock FC 283 via TKO in round one, Rashard Lovelace via unanimous decision at Shamrock FC 290, Seth Basler at Shamrock FC 295 via unanimous decision, and finally Lovelace for the second time via unanimous decision at Shamrock FC 311.

With 5 days notice and having to cut 24 pounds in that time span, Woodson appeared on Dana White's Contender Series 21, where he faced Terrance McKinney and went on to defeat him via flying knee KO in the second round, earning a contract with the UFC.

=== Ultimate Fighting Championship ===
Woodson made his promotional debut against Kyle Bochniak on October 18, 2019, at UFC on ESPN 6. He won the fight via unanimous decision.

Woodson was expected to face Kyle Nelson on June 27, 2020, at UFC on ESPN 12. Nelson had to pull out off the bout due to visa issues, and therefore was replaced by Julian Erosa He lost the fight via D'arce choke in the third round.

Woodson was scheduled to face Jonathan Pearce on November 28, 2020, at UFC on ESPN 18. However, Woodson withdrew a week before the event for unknown reasons and was replaced by Kai Kamaka III.

Woodson faced Youssef Zalal on June 5, 2021, at UFC Fight Night 189. He won the bout via split decision.

Woodson faced Collin Anglin on November 13, 2021, at UFC Fight Night 197. He won the bout via TKO in round one.

Woodson faced Luis Saldaña on August 20, 2022, at UFC 278. He fought to a split draw decision.

Woodson was scheduled to face Steve Garcia on August 5, 2023, at UFC Fight Night 225. However, the bout was scrapped after Garcia got injured and Woodson was booked against Jesse Butler. In turn, Butler was removed by the Nevada Athletic Commission during fight week due to a recent knockout loss to Jim Miller in two months earlier. He was replaced by promotional newcomer Mairon Santos. However, due to visa issues, Santos was removed from the bout and replaced with promotional newcomer Dennis Buzukja. Woodson won the bout via unanimous decision.

Woodson faced Charles Jourdain on January 20, 2024, at UFC 297. He won the competitive fight by split decision.

Woodson faced Alex Caceres on May 11, 2024, at UFC on ESPN 56. He won the fight by unanimous decision. 11 out of 14 media outlets scored the fight for Caceres.

Woodson faced Fernando Padilla on December 14, 2024 at UFC on ESPN 63. He won the fight by technical knockout at the end of the first round.

Woodson faced Dan Ige on April 12, 2025 at UFC 314. He lost the fight by technical knockout in the third round.

Woodson faced Jack Jenkins on August 29, 2026 at UFC Fight Night 286. He won the fight by split decision.

== Championships and accomplishments ==
=== Amateur Boxing ===
- Won boxing’s coveted Golden Gloves competition at light heavyweight

== Mixed martial arts record ==
Professional record breakdown
17 matches	14 wins	2 losses
By knockout	4	1
By submission	1	1
By decision	9	0
Draws	1	

Res.	Record	Opponent	Method	Event	Date	Round	Time	Location	Notes
Win	14–2–1	Jack Jenkins	Decision (split)	UFC Fight Night: Nurmagomedov vs. Song	August 29, 2026	3	5:00	Shanghai, China	
Loss	13–2–1	Dan Ige	TKO (punches)	UFC 314	April 12, 2025	3	1:12	Miami, Florida, United States	
Win	13–1–1	Fernando Padilla	TKO (punches)	UFC on ESPN: Covington vs. Buckley	December 14, 2024	1	4:58	Tampa, Florida, United States	
Win	12–1–1	Alex Caceres	Decision (unanimous)	UFC on ESPN: Lewis vs. Nascimento	May 11, 2024	3	5:00	St. Louis, Missouri, United States	
Win	11–1–1	Charles Jourdain	Decision (split)	UFC 297	January 20, 2024	3	5:00	Toronto, Ontario, Canada	
Win	10–1–1	Dennis Buzukja	Decision (unanimous)	UFC on ESPN: Sandhagen vs. Font	August 5, 2023	3	5:00	Nashville, Tennessee, United States	Catchweight (146.5 lb) bout; Buzukja missed weight.
Draw	9–1–1	Luis Saldaña	Draw (split)	UFC 278	August 20, 2022	3	5:00	Salt Lake City, Utah, United States	Saldaña was deducted one point in round 1 due to an illegal knee.
Win	9–1	Collin Anglin	TKO (punches to the body)	UFC Fight Night: Holloway vs. Rodríguez	November 13, 2021	1	4:30	Las Vegas, Nevada, United States	
Win	8–1	Youssef Zalal	Decision (split)	UFC Fight Night: Rozenstruik vs. Sakai	June 5, 2021	3	5:00	Las Vegas, Nevada, United States	
Loss	7–1	Julian Erosa	Submission (D'Arce choke)	UFC on ESPN: Poirier vs. Hooker	June 27, 2020	3	2:44	Las Vegas, Nevada, United States	Catchweight (150 lb) bout.
Win	7–0	Kyle Bochniak	Decision (unanimous)	UFC on ESPN: Reyes vs. Weidman	October 18, 2019	3	5:00	Boston, Massachusetts, United States	
Win	6–0	Terrance McKinney	KO (flying knee)	Dana White's Contender Series 21	July 23, 2019	2	1:49	Las Vegas, Nevada, United States	
Win	5–0	Rashard Lovelace	Decision (unanimous)	Shamrock FC 311	November 2, 2018	3	5:00	St. Louis, Missouri, United States	Lightweight bout.
Win	4–0	Seth Basler	Decision (unanimous)	Shamrock FC 295	September 22, 2017	3	5:00	St. Louis, Missouri, United States	Featherweight debut.
Win	3–0	Rashard Lovelace	Decision (unanimous)	Shamrock FC 290	June 2, 2017	3	5:00	St. Louis, Missouri, United States	Lightweight debut.
Win	2–0	Coltin Cole	TKO (punches)	Shamrock FC 283	January 28, 2017	1	2:38	St. Louis, Missouri, United States	Middleweight debut.
Win	1–0	Kevin Brown Jr.	Submission (guillotine choke)	RFA 44	September 30, 2016	1	1:35	St. Charles, Missouri, United States	Catchweight (180 lb) bout.

== Kickboxing record ==
Kickboxing record
1 Win ,0 losses
Date	Result	Opponent	Event	Location	Method	Round	Time
2015-02-21	Win	(United States) Bo Kunz	Lumiere Casino	Saint Louis, Missouri, US	Decision (Unanimous)	3	3:00

== See also ==
- List of current UFC fighters
- List of Dana White's Contender Series alumni
- List of male mixed martial artists
