= Austin Lingo =

American mixed martial artist

- Born: July 10, 1994 (age 32); Mesquite, Texas, United States
- Other names: Lights Out
- Height: 5 ft 10 in (1.78 m)
- Weight: 145 lb (66 kg; 10 st 5 lb)
- Division: Featherweight
- Reach: 70 in (178 cm)
- Fighting out of: Dallas, Texas, United States
- Team: Fortis MMA
- Rank: Purple belt in Brazilian Jiu-Jitsu; Black belt in Taekwondo
- Years active: 2017–present

Mixed martial arts record
- Total: 13
- Wins: 9
- By knockout: 3
- By submission: 2
- By decision: 4
- Losses: 4
- By knockout: 1
- By submission: 1
- By decision: 2

Other information
- Mixed martial arts record from Sherdog

Austin Lingo (born July 10, 1994) is an American mixed martial artist who competes in the Featherweight division. A professional since 2017, he is most notable for his stint in the Ultimate Fighting Championship.

== Early life ==
Lingo began training in martial arts at a young age after his father found out he’d been involved in a street fight. Lingo started boxing, along with training Tae Kwon Do, Kickboxing, and Muay Thai. He became so enthralled in the latter that he went across the globe to train in the birthplace of Muay Thai, Thailand.

== Mixed martial arts career ==
=== Early career ===
In his MMA debut at LFA 16, he defeated Charles Williams via unanimous decision. Lingo submitted Josh Foster in the first round via guillotine choke at Xtreme Knockout 39, before returning to Legacy Fighting Alliance, where he would spend the rest of his career on the regional scene. He would win his next 5 bouts under the banner; Omar Benjar via TKO in round one at LFA 33, Phil Gonzalez via unanimous decision at LFA 40, Aaron Webb via knock out in the first round at LFA 55, Angel Cruz via rear naked choke in the first round at LFA 62. In his final performance for the promotion, at LFA 73, Lingo faced Solo Hatley Jr., defeating him by knock out 25 seconds into the bout.

=== Ultimate Fighting Championship ===
In his promotional debut, Lingo faced fellow newcomer Youssef Zalal on February 8, 2020, at UFC 247. He lost the fight via unanimous decision.

Lingo faced Jacob Kilburn on January 16, 2021, at UFC on ABC 1. He won the bout in convincing fashion via unanimous decision.

Lingo faced Luis Saldaña on August 21, 2021, at UFC on ESPN 29. He won the fight via unanimous decision.

Lingo was scheduled to face Jonathan Pearce on February 19, 2022, at UFC Fight Night 201. However, Lingo pulled out due to undisclosed reasons.

As the last fight of his prevailing contract, Lingo was scheduled to face David Onama on July 9, 2022, at UFC on ESPN 39. However, Lingo pulled out during fight week.

As the first fight of his new multi-fight contract, Lingo was expected to face Ricardo Ramos in a featherweight bout on March 11, 2023, at UFC Fight Night 221. However, the bout was cancelled after Ramos weighed in at 154 pounds, eight pounds over the featherweight non-title fight limit.

Lingo faced Nate Landwehr, replacing Alex Caceres, on March 25, 2023, at UFC on ESPN 43. Lingo lost the bout via rear-naked choke at the end of the second round.

Lingo next face Melquizael Costa at UFC on ESPN 49 on July 15, 2023. He lost the fight via unanimous decision.

On December 12, 2023, it was announced that Lingo was no longer on the UFC roster.

=== Post-UFC Career ===
In his first fight since leaving the UFC, Lingo faced undefeated prospect Cameron Teague in the main event of Fury FC 95 on August 2, 2024. He would lose the fight via technical knockout in the second round.

== Mixed martial arts record ==
Professional record breakdown
13 matches	9 wins	4 losses
By knockout	3	1
By submission	2	1
By decision	4	2

Res.	Record	Opponent	Method	Event	Date	Round	Time	Location	Notes
Loss	9–4	Cam Teague	TKO (knee and punches)	Fury FC 95	August 2, 2023	2	4:57	Dallas, Texas, United States	
Loss	9–3	Melquizael Costa	Decision (unanimous)	UFC on ESPN: Holm vs. Bueno Silva	July 15, 2023	3	5:00	Las Vegas, Nevada, United States	
Loss	9–2	Nate Landwehr	Submission (rear-naked choke)	UFC on ESPN: Vera vs. Sandhagen	March 25, 2023	2	4:11	San Antonio, Texas, United States	
Win	9–1	Luis Saldaña	Decision (unanimous)	UFC on ESPN: Cannonier vs. Gastelum	August 21, 2021	3	5:00	Las Vegas, Nevada, United States	
Win	8–1	Jacob Kilburn	Decision (unanimous)	UFC on ABC: Holloway vs. Kattar	January 16, 2021	3	5:00	Abu Dhabi, United Arab Emirates	
Loss	7–1	Youssef Zalal	Decision (unanimous)	UFC 247	February 8, 2020	3	5:00	Houston, Texas, United States	
Win	7–0	Solo Hatley Jr.	KO (punches)	LFA 73	August 2, 2019	1	0:25	Dallas, Texas, United States	
Win	6–0	Angel Luis Cruz	Technical Submission (rear-naked choke)	LFA 62	March 22, 2019	1	0:25	Dallas, Texas, United States	Catchweight (150 lb) bout.
Win	5–0	Aaron Webb	KO (punches)	LFA 55	November 30, 2018	1	0:13	Dallas, Texas, United States	
Win	4–0	Phil Gonzalez	Decision (unanimous)	LFA 40	May 25, 2018	3	5:00	Dallas, Texas, United States	
Win	3–0	Omar Benjar	TKO (punches)	LFA 33	February 16, 2018	1	2:26	Dallas, Texas, United States	
Win	2–0	Josh Foster	Submission (guillotine choke)	XKO 39	January 6, 2018	1	0:35	Dallas, Texas, United States	Featherweight debut.
Win	1–0	Charles Williams	Decision (unanimous)	LFA 16	July 14, 2017	3	5:00	Dallas, Texas, United States	Catchweight (150 lb) bout.

== See also ==
- List of male mixed martial artists
