= Jordan Griffin =

American mixed martial artist

- Born: February 23, 1990 (age 36); Milwaukee, Wisconsin, U.S.
- Nickname: "The Native Psycho"
- Height: 5 ft 10 in (1.78 m)
- Weight: 145 lb (66 kg; 10 st 5 lb)
- Division: Lightweight (2011-2013); Featherweight (2014–present)
- Reach: 74.5 in (189 cm)
- Fighting out of: Milwaukee, Wisconsin, U.S.
- Team: Roufusport MMA Academy
- Rank: Brown belt in Brazilian Jiu-Jitsu
- Years active: 2011-present

Mixed martial arts record
- Total: 30
- Wins: 19
- By knockout: 6
- By submission: 9
- By decision: 4
- Losses: 11
- By knockout: 1
- By submission: 2
- By decision: 8

Amateur record
- Total: 7
- Wins: 5
- By knockout: 3
- By submission: 1
- Losses: 2
- By knockout: 1

Other information
- Mixed martial arts record from Sherdog

Jordan Griffin (born February 23, 1990) is an American mixed martial artist who competes in the Featherweight division. A professional competitor since 2011, he has competed for the Ultimate Fighting Championship, Legacy Fighting Alliance and King of the Cage. He is the former KOTC, RFO and Dakota FC Featherweight champion.

== Martial arts career ==
=== Amateur career ===
Jordan Griffin made his amateur debut in 2009 as a welterweight, when he fought Luke Drummond during Racine Fight Night 5. Griffin won through a second-round TKO. He won his second fight by a second-round TKO, versus Trevor Konetzke, as well. He won his third fight against Mitchell Kanter by decision and fourth fight against Mark Mora by submission. He would then lose by knockout to Shane Hinton and decision to Tim Hallock. He won his last amateur fight against Micah Fulton by a knockout. He ended his amateur career with a 5–2 record.

=== Early career ===
Jordan Griffin made his professional debut in 2011, as a lightweight, against Tyler Hellenbrand. He lost by decision. He lost his second fight against Gary Bivens by submission. He would win his third fight against Ryan Smith by unanimous decision, but lost the next one, versus Damian Norris, by TKO.

He would then go on a five fight winning streak, before dropping down to featherweight to face Robert Tahtinen. He won the fight by TKO. He won the next fight, against Anthony Fleming, by a guillotine choke. His seven fight winning streak was stopped by Dan Moret, whom defeated him by a rear naked choke.

In his next fight, he faced Cameron Ramberg for the Dakota FC Featherweight title. He won the fight by majority decision.

At KOTC - Total Dominance, Griffin fought Ben Pierre-Saint for the KOTC Featherweight title. He won by a head kick KO. Griffin went on to defend the title three times, finishing all three of those fights. For his fourth defense, he was scheduled to fight Juan Archuleta. Griffin lost by unanimous decision.

=== Dana White's Contender Series ===
After winning his next three fights, Griffin was scheduled to fight Maurice Mitchell during Dana White's Contender Series 15. Griffin won the fight in the first round by a rear naked choke. He was awarded a UFC contract after the fight.

=== Ultimate Fighting Championship ===
Jordan Griffin was scheduled to make his UFC debut during UFC on ESPN: Ngannou vs. dos Santos against Chas Skelly. Skelly would get injured before the fight and was replaced by Vince Murdock. Murdock would later withdraw himself, as he was not medically cleared to fight.

Griffin made his debut during UFC on Fox: Lee vs. Iaquinta 2 against Dan Ige. Ige won a unanimous decision. Griffin suffered multiple torn muscles in his right arm during the fight.

His fight against Chas Skelly was rescheduled for UFC Fight Night: Cowboy vs. Gaethje. Skelly won the fight by unanimous decision.

Griffin achieved his first UFC win during UFC Fight Night: Benavidez vs. Figueiredo, when he faced T.J. Brown and won by a guillotine choke. This win earned him the Performance of the Night award.

Griffin was scheduled to fight a rematch with Darrick Minner on June 13, 2020, at UFC Fight Night: Eye vs. Calvillo. However, on the day prior to the event, Minner was pulled from the fight due to health issues surrounding his weight cut and the bout was cancelled.

Griffin faced Youssef Zalal on June 27, 2020, at UFC on ESPN: Poirier vs. Hooker. He lost the fight via unanimous decision.

Griffin faced Luis Saldaña on April 10, 2021, at UFC on ABC 2. He lost the bout via controversial unanimous decision. 16 out of 18 media scores gave it to Griffin.

After the loss, he was released from the UFC.

=== Post UFC ===
Griffin made his first appearance since his UFC release against Josh Rohler at NAFC: Colosseum on April 16, 2022. He lost the bout via unanimous decision.

== Championships and accomplishments ==
=== Mixed martial arts ===
- Ultimate Fighting Championship
  - Performance of the Night (One time) vs. T.J. Brown
- King of the Cage
  - King of the Cage Featherweight Champion (Two Defenses)

== Mixed martial arts record ==
Professional record breakdown
30 matches	19 wins	11 losses
By knockout	6	1
By submission	9	2
By decision	4	8

Res.	Record	Opponent	Method	Event	Date	Round	Time	Location	Notes
Win	19–11	Travis Karppinen	TKO (punches)	Warrior Games 17	January 13, 2024	1	2:41	Bayfield, Wisconsin, United States	Catchweight (165 lb) bout.
Loss	18–11	Dakota Bush	Decision (unanimous)	Iowa Fight Series 1	October 21, 2023	3	5:00	Marshalltown, Iowa, United States	
Loss	18–10	Josh Rohler	Decision (unanimous)	NAFC: Colosseum	April 16, 2022	3	5:00	Waukesha, Wisconsin, United States	Return to Lightweight.
Loss	18–9	Luis Saldaña	Decision (unanimous)	UFC on ABC: Vettori vs. Holland	April 10, 2021	3	5:00	Las Vegas, Nevada, United States	
Loss	18–8	Youssef Zalal	Decision (unanimous)	UFC on ESPN: Poirier vs. Hooker	June 27, 2020	3	5:00	Las Vegas, Nevada, United States	
Win	18–7	T.J. Brown	Technical submission (guillotine choke)	UFC Fight Night: Benavidez vs. Figueiredo	February 29, 2020	2	3:38	Norfolk, Virginia, United States	Performance of the Night.
Loss	17–7	Chas Skelly	Decision (unanimous)	UFC Fight Night: Cowboy vs. Gaethje	September 14, 2019	3	5:00	Vancouver, British Columbia, Canada	
Loss	17–6	Dan Ige	Decision (unanimous)	UFC on Fox: Lee vs. Iaquinta 2	December 15, 2018	3	5:00	Milwaukee, Wisconsin, United States	
Win	17–5	Maurice Mitchell	Submission (rear-naked choke)	Dana White's Contender Series 15	July 31, 2018	1	3:57	Las Vegas, Nevada, United States	
Win	16–5	Shawn West	Submission (neck crank)	LFA 41	February 24, 2018	1	4:52	Prior Lake, Minnesota, United States	Catchweight (150 lb) bout.
Win	15–5	Darrick Minner	Submission (armbar)	LFA 34	March 2, 2018	2	3:59	Prior Lake, Minnesota, United States	
Win	14–5	Cody Stevens	Submission (guillotine choke)	Big Guns 25	April 6, 2017	4	3:13	Mansfield, Ohio, United States	Won the Big Guns Featherweight Championship.
Loss	13–5	Juan Archuleta	Decision (unanimous)	KOTC: Destructive Intent	July 23, 2016	5	5:00	Washington, Pennsylvania, United States	Lost the KOTC Bantamweight Championship.
Win	13–4	Adam Ward	TKO (retirement)	KOTC: Generation X	April 8, 2016	1	5:00	Carlton, Minnesota, United States	Defended the KOTC Bantamweight Championship.
Win	12–4	Justin Likness	TKO (punches)	KOTC: Battle at the Lake	November 14, 2015	2	2:36	Saint Michael, North Dakota, United States	Defended the KOTC Bantamweight Championship.
Win	11–4	Seth Dikun	Submission (rear-naked choke)	KOTC: Warriors Collide	August 8, 2015	2	3:02	Manistee, Michigan, United States	Won the vacant KOTC Bantamweight Championship.
Win	10–4	Ben Pierre-Saint	TKO (head kick)	KOTC: Total Dominance	May 16, 2015	2	2:37	Carlton, Minnesota, United States	
Win	9–4	Cameron Ramberg	Decision (majority)	Dakota FC: Spring Brawl 2015	April 18, 2015	1	4:17	Fargo, North Dakota, United States	Won the Dakota FC Featherweight Championship.
Loss	8–4	Dan Moret	Submission (rear-naked choke)	RFA 19	October 10, 2014	1	3:09	Prior Lake, Minnesota, United States	
Win	8–3	Anthony Fleming	Submission (guillotine choke)	NAFC: Summer Slam	July 26, 2014	1	0:59	Milwaukee, Wisconsin, United States	Return to Featherweight.
Win	7–3	Robert Tahtinen	TKO (punches)	Complete Cage Promotions	June 7, 2013	2	2:42	Danbury, Wisconsin, United States	Lightweight bout.
Win	6–3	Josh Wolfe	Submission (guillotine choke)	Great Lakes Combat Association: Battle at Bad River	November 16, 2013	1	N/A	Wisconsin, United States	Bantamweight debut.
Win	5–3	Gino DiGiulio	Decision (unanimous)	NAFC: Battle in the Ballroom	September 28, 2013	3	5:00	Milwaukee, Wisconsin, United States	Lightweight bout.
Win	4–3	Alex Van Krevelen	Decision (unanimous)	Caged Chaos at Canterbury Park 2	April 27, 2013	3	5:00	Shakopee, Minnesota, United States	
Win	3–3	Dennis Anderson	TKO (punches)	Madtown Throwdown 29	January 5, 2013	1	3:30	Madison, Wisconsin, United States	
Wi	2–3	Evian Rodríguez	Submission (brabo choke)	KOTC: Trump Card	June 30, 2012	2	1:54	Lac Du Flambeau, Wisconsin, United States	
Loss	1–3	Damian Norris	TKO (doctor stoppage)	XFO 43	April 13, 2012	2	3:02	Hoffman Estates, Illinois, United States	Featherweight debut.
Win	1–2	Ryan Smith	Decision (unanimous)	Madtown Throwdown 26	January 7, 2012	3	5:00	Madison, Wisconsin, United States	
Loss	0–2	Gary Bivens	Submission (guillotine)	Combat USA: Country USA 1	June 25, 2011	1	0:51	Oshkosh, Wisconsin, United States	
Loss	0–1	Tyler Hellenbrand	Decision (unanimous)	Combat USA: Wisconsin State Finals	April 22, 2011	3	5:00	Green Bay, Wisconsin, United States	Lightweight debut.

== Amateur mixed martial arts record ==
Amateur record breakdown		
7 matches	5 wins	2 losses
By knockout	3	1
By submission	1	0
By decision	1	1

Res.	Record	Opponent	Method	Event	Date	Round	Time	Location	Notes
Win	5–2	Micah Fulton	KO (Punch)	Extreme Cagefighting Organization 7	21 August 2010	1	1:14	Wisconsin Dells, Wisconsin, United States	
Loss	4–2	Tim Hallock	Decision (Unanimous)	Combat USA Fighting Championship 6/18/10	18 June 2010	3	3:00	Milwaukee, Wisconsin, United States	
Loss	4–1	Shane Hinton	KO (Punch)	Extreme Cagefighting Organization 5	8 May 2010	1	0:16	Baraboo, Wisconsin, United States	
Win	4–0	Mark Mora	Submission (Rear Naked Choke)	Konquer the Kage 31: Immortality	24 April 2010	1	1:02	Eau Claire, Wisconsin, United States	
Win	3–0	Mitchell Kanter	Decision (Unanimous)	Racine Fight Night 6	27 February 2010	3	3:00	Racine, Wisconsin, United States	
Win	2–0	Trevor Konetzke	TKO (Punches)	IFC: Caged Combat Oneida	8 January 2010	2	2:25	Green Bay, Wisconsin, United States	
Win	1–0	Luke Drummond	TKO (Punches)	Racine Fight Night (RFN) 5 - Thanksgiving Thrash	28 November 2009	2	1:23	Racine, Wisconsin, United States	Welterweight debut.
