= UFC on ESPN: Poirier vs. Hooker =

UFC mixed martial arts event in 2020

- The poster for UFC on ESPN: Poirier vs. Hooker
- Promotion: Ultimate Fighting Championship
- Date: June 27, 2020
- Venue: UFC Apex
- City: Enterprise, Nevada, United States
- Attendance: None (behind closed doors)

Event chronology
UFC on ESPN: Blaydes vs. Volkov	UFC on ESPN: Poirier vs. Hooker	UFC 251: Usman vs. Masvidal

UFC on ESPN: Poirier vs. Hooker (also known as UFC on ESPN 12 and UFC Vegas 4) was a mixed martial arts event produced by the Ultimate Fighting Championship that took place on June 27, 2020 at the UFC Apex facility in Enterprise, Nevada, part of the Las Vegas Metropolitan Area, United States.

== Background ==
The event was initially scheduled to take place at the Frank Erwin Center in Austin, Texas. Due to the COVID-19 pandemic, UFC president Dana White announced on April 9 that starting with UFC 249, all future events were indefinitely postponed. The event would have marked the promotion's fourth visit to Austin, following UFC Fight Night: Cowboy vs. Medeiros in February 2018. On May 21, the UFC announced the cancelation of the event in Austin.

A lightweight bout between former interim UFC Lightweight Champion Dustin Poirier and Dan Hooker headlined the event. The pairing was previously expected to headline an event on May 16 in San Diego, California. That event was effectively canceled on April 20, after the California State Athletic Commission (CSAC) extended a moratorium on combat sports events through May 31 due to the COVID-19 pandemic.

A women's flyweight bout between Alexa Grasso and Ji Yeon Kim was initially scheduled for this event. However, the bout was rescheduled and would take place on August 29 at UFC Fight Night: Smith vs. Rakić.

Ian Heinisch was expected to face Brendan Allen at the event. However, Heinisch pulled out of the matchup in mid-June citing injury and was replaced by promotional newcomer Kyle Daukaus.

A women's flyweight bout between former Invicta FC Flyweight Champion Jennifer Maia and Viviane Araújo was initially scheduled for this event. However, the bout was rescheduled in mid-June and moved to UFC Fight Night: Brunson vs. Shahbazyan on August 1 after both participants faced travel restrictions related to the COVID-19 pandemic.

A women's bantamweight bout between Aspen Ladd and former UFC Women's Bantamweight Championship challenger (also 2004 Olympic silver medalist in wrestling) Sara McMann was scheduled for the event. However, the bout was scrapped after Ladd suffered an injury and was forced to withdraw from the event, tearing both her anterior cruciate ligament (ACL) and medial collateral ligament (MCL) in training.

A catchweight bout between Sean Woodson and Kyle Nelson was scheduled for the event. However, Nelson was pulled from the event due to a visa issue and replaced by Julian Erosa.

A women's flyweight bout between Miranda Maverick and Mara Romero Borella was scheduled for the event. However, Maverick was forced to pull out due to injury and the bout was scrapped.

Ramiz Brahimaj was scheduled to face Takashi Sato at the event. However, Brahimaj was pulled from the fight during the week leading up to the event in an abundance of caution, after a cornerman of his tested positive for COVID-19. Promotional newcomer Jason Witt stepped in as a replacement to face Sato.

== Results ==
Main card (ESPN)
Weight class				Method	Round	Time	Notes
Lightweight	Dustin Poirier	def.	Dan Hooker	Decision (unanimous) (48–47, 48–47, 48–46)	5	5:00
Welterweight	Mike Perry	def.	Mickey Gall	Decision (unanimous) (29–28, 29–28, 29–28)	3	5:00
Heavyweight	Maurice Greene	def.	Gian Villante	Submission (arm-triangle choke)	3	3:44
Middleweight	Brendan Allen	def.	Kyle Daukaus	Decision (unanimous) (29–28, 29–27, 30–27)	3	5:00
Welterweight	Takashi Sato	def.	Jason Witt	TKO (punches)	1	0:48
Catchweight (150 lb)	Julian Erosa	def.	Sean Woodson	Submission (D’Arce choke)	3	2:44
Preliminary card (ESPN)
Lightweight	Khama Worthy	def.	Luis Peña	Submission (guillotine choke)	3	2:53
Heavyweight	Tanner Boser	def.	Philipe Lins	KO (punches)	1	2:41
Women's Strawweight	Kay Hansen	def.	Jinh Yu Frey	Submission (armbar)	3	2:26
Featherweight	Youssef Zalal	def.	Jordan Griffin	Decision (unanimous) (29–28, 29–28, 29–28)	3	5:00

== Bonus awards ==
The following fighters received $50,000 bonuses.

- Fight of the Night: Dustin Poirier vs. Dan Hooker
- Performance of the Night: Julian Erosa and Kay Hansen

== Reported payout ==
The following is the reported payout to the fighters as reported to the Nevada State Athletic Commission (NSAC). It does not include sponsor money and also does not include the UFC's traditional "fight night" bonuses. The total disclosed payout for the event was $1,140,000.

- Dustin Poirier: $300,000 (includes $150,000 win bonus) def. Dan Hooker: $110,000
- Mike Perry: $180,000 (includes $90,000 win bonus) def. Mickey Gall: $50,000
- Maurice Greene: $60,000 (includes $30,000 win bonus) def. Gian Villante: $75,000
- Brendan Allen: $28,000 (includes $14,000 win bonus) def. Kyle Daukaus: $12,000
- Takashi Sato: $28,000 (includes $14,000 win bonus) def. Jason Witt: $12,000
- Julian Erosa: $28,000 (includes $14,000 win bonus) def. Sean Woodson: $12,000
- Khama Worthy: $28,000 (includes $14,000 win bonus) def. Luis Peña: $27,000
- Tanner Boser: $24,000 (includes $12,000 win bonus) def. Philipe Lins: $80,000
- Kay Hansen: $28,000 (includes $14,000 win bonus) def. Jinh Yu Frey: $14,000
- Youssef Zalal: $24,000 (includes $12,000 win bonus) def. Jordan Griffin: $20,000

== Aftermath ==
On August 5, it was announced that the NSAC issued a temporary suspension for Luis Peña, after he tested positive for marijuana in his pre-fight screenings. On September 3, the NSAC announced that Peña was suspended four and a half months and fined 15% of his fight purse. The reduced suspension was due to his fight being taken on short notice.

== See also ==
- List of UFC events
- List of current UFC fighters
- 2020 in UFC
