= UFC 287 =

Mixed martial arts event in 2023

UFC 287: Pereira vs. Adesanya 2
- The poster for UFC 287: Pereira vs. Adesanya 2
- Promotion: Ultimate Fighting Championship
- Date: April 8, 2023
- Venue: Kaseya Center
- City: Miami, Florida, United States
- Attendance: 19,032
- Total gate: $11,943,363.20

Event chronology
UFC on ESPN: Vera vs. Sandhagen	UFC 287: Pereira vs. Adesanya 2	UFC on ESPN: Holloway vs. Allen

UFC 287: Pereira vs. Adesanya 2 was a mixed martial arts event produced by the Ultimate Fighting Championship that took place on April 8, 2023, at the Kaseya Center in Miami, Florida, United States.

== Background ==
The event marked the promotion's second visit to Miami and first since UFC 42 in April 2003.

A UFC Middleweight Championship rematch between current champion Alex Pereira (also former Glory Middleweight and Light Heavyweight Champion) and former champion Israel Adesanya headlined the event. The pairing previously met at UFC 281 in which Pereira captured the title by fifth-round knockout. The two also previously met twice in kickboxing matchups: the first in April 2016 at Glory of Heroes 1, which Pereira won by unanimous decision, and their second at Glory of Heroes 7 in March 2017, which Pereira won by third-round knockout.

Nikolas Motta was expected to face Ignacio Bahamondes in a lightweight bout. However, Motta pulled out in late March due to a cut on his head. He was replaced by Trey Ogden at a catchweight of 160 pounds.

A welterweight bout between The Ultimate Fighter: Live lightweight winner Michael Chiesa and Li Jingliang was expected to take place at the event. However, Li withdrew from the bout due to a back injury and the bout was scrapped.

Chris Barnett was expected to face Chase Sherman in a heavyweight bout. However, Barnett pulled out due to undisclosed reasons in early April and was replaced by Karl Williams. In turn, Sherman withdrew the day of the event due to a medical issue and the bout was scrapped.

At the weigh-ins, Christian Rodriguez weighed in at 137 pounds, one pound over the bantamweight non-title fight limit. His bout proceeded at catchweight and he was fined 20% of his purse which went to his opponent Raul Rosas Jr.

During the event's broadcast, it was announced that a UFC Welterweight Championship bout that took place in July 2015 at UFC 189 between then champion Robbie Lawler and challenger Rory MacDonald was the next "fight wing" UFC Hall of Fame inductee. Lawler defended the title via fifth-round TKO. It was also a rematch of a November 2013 fight in which Lawler also won (via split decision).

== Results ==
Main card
Weight class				Method	Round	Time	Notes
Middleweight	Israel Adesanya	def.	Alex Pereira (c)	KO (punches)	2	4:21	(Note: For the UFC Middleweight Championship.)
Welterweight	Gilbert Burns	def.	Jorge Masvidal	Decision (unanimous) (30–27, 30–27, 29–28)	3	5:00
Bantamweight	Rob Font	def.	Adrian Yañez	TKO (punches)	1	2:57
Welterweight	Kevin Holland	def.	Santiago Ponzinibbio	KO (punch)	3	3:16
Catchweight (137 lb)	Christian Rodriguez	def.	Raul Rosas Jr.	Decision (unanimous) (29–27, 29–28, 29–28)	3	5:00
Preliminary card (ESPN / ESPN+)
Middleweight	Kelvin Gastelum	def.	Chris Curtis	Decision (unanimous) (29–28, 29–28, 30–27)	3	5:00
Women's Strawweight	Luana Pinheiro	def.	Michelle Waterson-Gomez	Decision (split) (28–29, 29–28, 29–28)	3	5:00
Middleweight	Joe Pyfer	def.	Gerald Meerschaert	TKO (punches)	1	3:15
Women's Strawweight	Lupita Godinez	def.	Cynthia Calvillo	Decision (split) (28–29, 29–28, 30–27)	3	5:00
Early preliminary card (ESPN+ / UFC Fight Pass)
Catchweight (160 lb)	Ignacio Bahamondes	def.	Trey Ogden	Decision (unanimous) (30–27, 30–27, 29–28)	3	5:00
Featherweight	Steve Garcia	def.	Shayilan Nuerdanbieke	KO (body kick and punches)	2	0:36
Women's Strawweight	Sam Hughes	def.	Jaqueline Amorim	Decision (unanimous) (29–28, 29–28, 29–28)	3	5:00

== Bonus awards ==
The following fighters received $50,000 bonuses.

- Fight of the Night: Kelvin Gastelum vs. Chris Curtis
- Performance of the Night: Israel Adesanya and Rob Font

== See also ==
- 2023 in UFC
- List of current UFC fighters
- List of UFC events
