= UFC 278 =

2022 mixed martial arts event

UFC 278: Usman vs. Edwards 2
- The poster for UFC 278: Usman vs. Edwards 2
- Promotion: Ultimate Fighting Championship
- Date: August 20, 2022
- Venue: Vivint Arena
- City: Salt Lake City, Utah, United States
- Attendance: 18,321
- Total gate: $4,297,655

Event chronology
UFC on ESPN: Vera vs. Cruz	UFC 278: Usman vs. Edwards 2	UFC Fight Night: Gane vs. Tuivasa

UFC 278: Usman vs. Edwards 2 was a mixed martial arts event produced by the Ultimate Fighting Championship that took place on August 20, 2022, at Vivint Arena in Salt Lake City, Utah, United States.

== Background ==
The event marked the promotion's second visit to Salt Lake City, following UFC Fight Night: Rodríguez vs. Caceres in August 2016.

A UFC Welterweight Championship bout between current champion (also The Ultimate Fighter: American Top Team vs. Blackzilians welterweight winner) Kamaru Usman and Leon Edwards headlined the event. The pairing previously met at UFC on Fox: dos Anjos vs. Cowboy 2 in December 2015 where Usman defeated Edwards by unanimous decision.

A middleweight bout between former Strikeforce and UFC Middleweight Champion Luke Rockhold and former title challenger Paulo Costa was expected to take place at UFC 277. However, the bout was postponed to this event for unknown reasons.

A flyweight bout between Victor Altamirano and Jake Hadley was scheduled for this event. However, after Hadley pulled out of the bout due to injury he was replaced by Daniel Lacerda.

A women's flyweight bout between Miranda Maverick and Shanna Young was scheduled for the event. However, the bout was cancelled on the day of the weigh-ins as Young was hospitalized due to weight cut issues. They were rescheduled for UFC Fight Night 214.

== Results ==
Main card
Weight class				Method	Round	Time	Notes
Welterweight	Leon Edwards	def.	Kamaru Usman (c)	KO (head kick)	5	4:04	(Note: For the UFC Welterweight Championship.)
Middleweight	Paulo Costa	def.	Luke Rockhold	Decision (unanimous) (30–27, 30–27, 30–27)	3	5:00
Bantamweight	Merab Dvalishvili	def.	José Aldo	Decision (unanimous) (29–28, 29–28, 30–27)	3	5:00
Women's Bantamweight	Lucie Pudilová	def.	Wu Yanan	TKO (elbows)	2	4:04
Light Heavyweight	Tyson Pedro	def.	Harry Hunsucker	TKO (body kick and punches)	1	1:05
Preliminary card (ESPN / ESPN+ / ABC)
Heavyweight	Marcin Tybura	def.	Alexander Romanov	Decision (majority) (29–28, 29–28, 28–28)	3	5:00
Lightweight	Jared Gordon	def.	Leonardo Santos	Decision (unanimous) (30–27, 30–27, 30–27)	3	5:00
Featherweight	Sean Woodson	vs.	Luis Saldaña	Draw (split) (29–27, 27–29, 28–28)	3	5:00	(Note: Saldaña was deducted 1 point in round 1 due to an illegal knee.)
Welterweight	Ange Loosa	def.	A.J. Fletcher	Decision (unanimous) (29–27, 29–28, 29–28)	3	5:00
Early preliminary card (ESPN / ESPN+ / UFC Fight Pass)
Flyweight	Amir Albazi	def.	Francisco Figueiredo	Submission (rear-naked choke)	1	4:34
Bantamweight	Aori Qileng	def.	Jay Perrin	Decision (unanimous) (29–28, 29–28, 29–28)	3	5:00
Flyweight	Victor Altamirano	def.	Daniel Lacerda	TKO (punches and elbows)	1	3:39

== Bonus awards ==
The following fighters received $50,000 bonuses.

- Fight of the Night: Paulo Costa vs. Luke Rockhold
- Performance of the Night: Leon Edwards and Victor Altamirano

The following fighters received Crypto.com "Fan Bonus of the Night" awards paid in bitcoin of US$30,000 for first place, US$20,000 for second place, and US$10,000 for third place.

- First Place: Paulo Costa
- Second Place: Kamaru Usman
- Third Place: José Aldo

== Reported payout ==
The following is the reported payout to the fighters as reported to the Utah Athletic Commission. The amounts do not include sponsor money, discretionary bonuses, viewership points or additional earnings. The total disclosed payout for the event was $2,542,000.

- Leon Edwards: $350,000 (no win bonus) def. Kamaru Usman: $500,000
- Paulo Costa: $130,000 (includes $65,000 win bonus) def. Luke Rockhold: $200,000
- Merab Dvalishvili: $198,000 (includes $99,000 win bonus) def. José Aldo: $400,000
- Lucie Pudilová: $48,000 (includes $24,000 win bonus) def. Wu Yanan: $20,000
- Tyson Pedro: $86,000 (includes $43,000 win bonus) def. Harry Hunsucker: $12,000
- Marcin Tybura: $240,000 (includes $120,000 win bonus) def. Alexandr Romanov: $36,000
- Jared Gordon: $94,000 (includes $47,000 win bonus) def. Leonardo Santos: $44,000
- Sean Woodson: $24,000 vs. Luis Saldaña: $14,000
- Ange Loosa: $24,000 (includes $12,000 win bonus) def. A.J. Fletcher: $10,000
- Amir Albazi: $32,000 (includes $16,000 win bonus) def. Francisco Figueiredo: $14,000
- Aori Qileng: $24,000 (includes $12,000 win bonus) def. Jay Perrin: $12,000
- Victor Altamirano: $20,000 (includes $10,000 win bonus) def. Daniel da Silva: $10,000

== See also ==
- List of UFC events
- List of current UFC fighters
- 2022 in UFC
