= Darrick Minner =

American mixed martial arts fighter

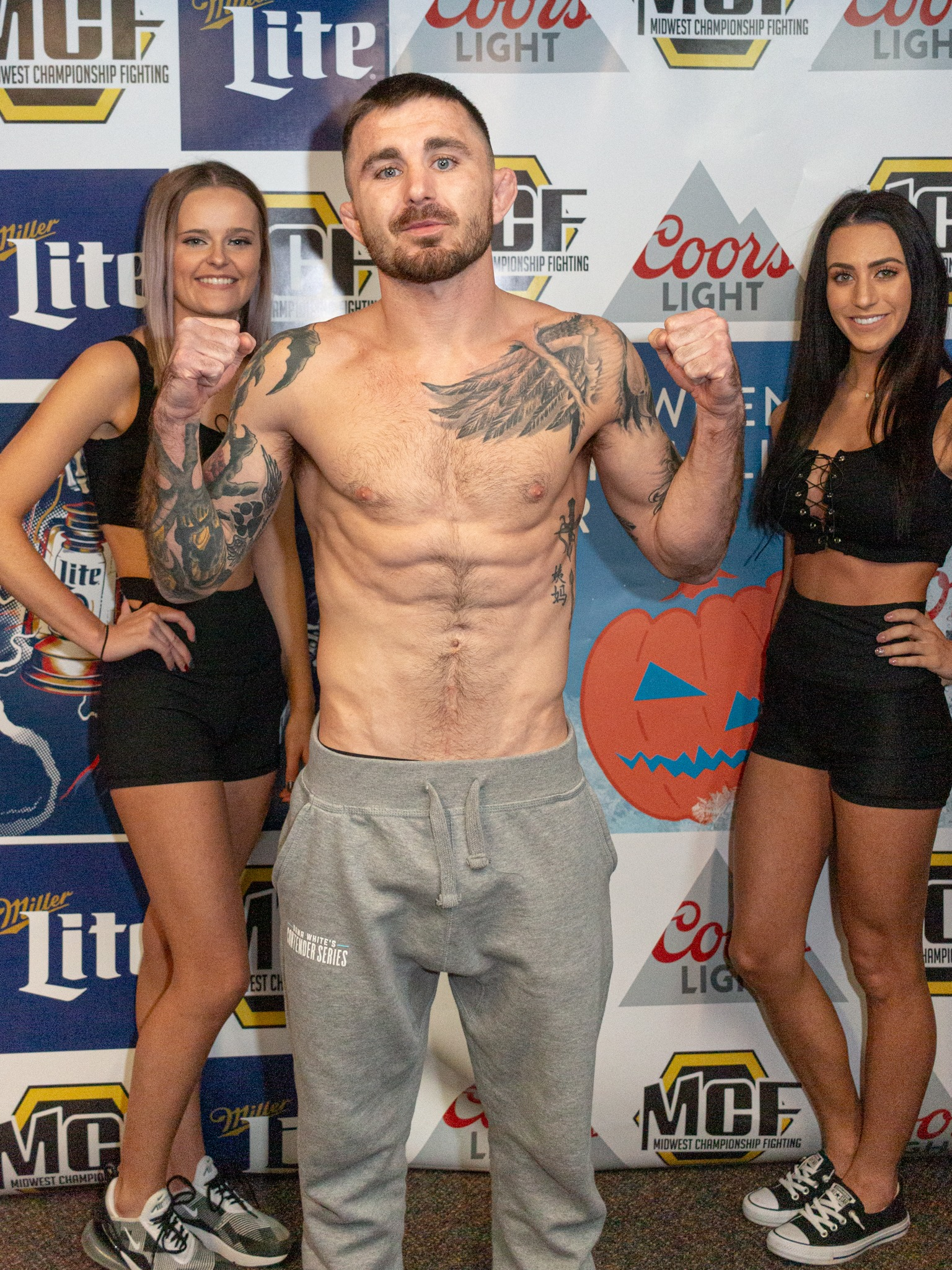
- Born: Darrick Jeffrey Minner; April 28, 1990 (age 36); Auburn, Nebraska, United States
- Height: 5 ft 7 in (1.70 m)
- Weight: 145 lb (66 kg; 10 st 5 lb)
- Division: Lightweight; Featherweight; Bantamweight
- Reach: 69.0 in (175 cm)
- Fighting out of: Nebraska City, Nebraska
- Team: Disorderly Conduct; Premier Combat Center; Xtreme Couture (until 2020); Glory MMA (2020–present)
- Years active: 2012–present

Mixed martial arts record
- Total: 43
- Wins: 28
- By knockout: 1
- By submission: 24
- By decision: 3
- Losses: 15
- By knockout: 4
- By submission: 8
- By decision: 3

Other information
- Mixed martial arts record from Sherdog

Darrick Minner (born April 28, 1990) is an American mixed martial artist who competed in the Featherweight division of the Ultimate Fighting Championship.

== Background ==
Born in Auburn, Nebraska, and raised in Nebraska City, Minner wrestled at Nebraska City High School. He then continued wrestling at Iowa Western Community College.

== Mixed martial arts career ==
=== Early career ===
A professional mixed martial artist since October 2012 and representing Glory MMA and Fitness, Darrick Minner compiled a 24–10 record through 34 professional fights, the wins being 21 submissions, one knockout, and two decisions, during his days fighting on the regional MMA scene.

=== Dana White's Contender Series ===
Minner was invited to participate on Dana White's Contender Series 23 on August 9, 2019. He faced Herbert Burns, losing the bout via first-round submission.

=== Ultimate Fighting Championship ===
Minner made his UFC debut as an injury replacement for Chas Skelly against Grant Dawson on February 29, 2020, at UFC Fight Night: Benavidez vs. Figueiredo. At the weigh-ins, Dawson also failed to make weight, coming in at 149.5 pounds, 3.5 pounds over the featherweight non-title limit of 146 pounds. He was fined 30% of his fight purse, which went to Minner and the bout proceeded at a catchweight. Minner lost the fight via a submission in round two.

Minner was scheduled to fight a rematch with Jordan Griffin on June 13, 2020, at UFC Fight Night: Eye vs. Calvillo. However, on the day prior to the event, Minner was pulled from the fight due to health issues surrounding his weight cut and the bout was cancelled.

Minner faced T.J. Laramie on September 19, 2020, at UFC Fight Night: Covington vs. Woodley. He won the bout via guillotine choke in the first minute of the first round.

Minner faced Charles Rosa on February 20, 2021, at UFC Fight Night: Blaydes vs. Lewis. He won the fight via unanimous decision.

Minner faced Darren Elkins on July 24, 2021, at UFC on ESPN: Sandhagen vs. Dillashaw. He lost the fight via a technical knockout in round two.

Having fought out his previous contract, Minner signed a new four-fight deal and faced Ryan Hall on December 11, 2021, at UFC 269. He lost the bout via unanimous decision.

Minner was scheduled to face Damon Jackson on June 4, 2022, at UFC Fight Night 207. However, for undisclosed reasons, Minner was pulled from the event and he was replaced by newcomer Daniel Argueta.

==== Last fight in the UFC, suspension and investigations ====
Minner faced Shayilan Nuerdanbieke on November 5, 2022, at UFC Fight Night 214. He lost the fight via technical knockout in the first round after seemingly injuring his knee seconds into the bout.

On December 2, 2022, Minner was released from the UFC amid an investigation into suspicious betting patterns that occurred in his previous fight against Shayilan Nuerdanbieke. Subsequently, both Minner and his coach James Krause were indefinitely suspended by the Nevada State Athletic Commission for failing to disclose the injury Minner had sustained prior the fight.

== Personal life ==
Minner and his wife Jordyn have three daughters, Brixtyn, Brogyn and Brynn. His younger brothers Brady and Brett are also MMA fighters, mostly with the Omaha-based promotion Dynasty Combat Sports.

== Championships and accomplishments ==
- Dynasty Combat Sports
  - DCS Featherweight Champion (one time; former)
    - One successful title defense

== Mixed martial arts record ==
Professional record breakdown
43 matches	28 wins	15 losses
By knockout	1	4
By submission	24	8
By decision	3	3

Res.	Record	Opponent	Method	Event	Date	Round	Time	Location	Notes
Win	28–15	Eduardo Peralta	Submission (guillotine choke)	Dynasty Combat Sports 108	May 15, 2026	1	1:09	Lincoln, Nebraska, United States	Catchweight (160 lb) bout.
Win	27–15	Jacob Ritchie	Submission (twister)	Dynasty Combat Sports 102	November 21, 2025	2	1:05	Lincoln, Nebraska, United States	Catchweight (160 lb) bout.
Loss	26–15	Brock Hamer	Decision (split)	Dynasty Combat Sports 99	June 28, 2025	3	5:00	Ralston, Nebraska, United States	Return to Lightweight.
Loss	26–14	Shayilan Nuerdanbieke	TKO (elbows)	UFC Fight Night: Rodriguez vs. Lemos	November 5, 2022	1	1:07	Las Vegas, Nevada, United States	
Loss	26–13	Ryan Hall	Decision (unanimous)	UFC 269	December 11, 2021	3	5:00	Las Vegas, Nevada, United States	
Loss	26–12	Darren Elkins	TKO (punches)	UFC on ESPN: Sandhagen vs. Dillashaw	July 24, 2021	2	3:48	Las Vegas, Nevada, United States	
Win	26–11	Charles Rosa	Decision (unanimous)	UFC Fight Night: Blaydes vs. Lewis	February 20, 2021	3	5:00	Las Vegas, Nevada, United States	
Win	25–11	T.J. Laramie	Submission (guillotine choke)	UFC Fight Night: Covington vs. Woodley	September 19, 2020	1	0:52	Las Vegas, Nevada, United States	
Loss	24–11	Grant Dawson	Submission (rear-naked choke)	UFC Fight Night: Benavidez vs. Figueiredo	February 29, 2020	2	1:38	Norfolk, Virginia, United States	Catchweight (149.5 lb) bout; Dawson missed weight.
Win	24–10	Charlie DuBray	Technical Submission (shoulder choke)	Dynasty Combat Sports 57	December 6, 2019	1	1:33	Lincoln, Nebraska, United States	Defended the DCS Featherweight Championship.
Win	23–10	Terrance McKinney	Submission (triangle choke)	Midwest CF 18	October 19, 2019	1	0:57	North Platte, Nebraska, United States	
Loss	22–10	Herbert Burns	Submission (triangle armbar)	Dana White's Contender Series 23	August 6, 2019	1	2:29	Las Vegas, Nevada, United States	
Win	22–9	Clay Collard	Submission (rear-naked choke)	Final Fight Championship 33	November 2, 2018	1	0:31	Las Vegas, Nevada, United States	Lightweight bout.
Loss	21–9	Kevin Croom	TKO (elbows)	LFA 48	September 7, 2018	2	2:10	Kearney, Nebraska, United States	
Win	21–8	Joey Munoz	Submission (rear-naked choke)	Dynasty Combat Sports 41	April 21, 2018	2	4:50	Lincoln, Nebraska, United States	Won the vacant DCS Featherweight Championship.
Loss	20–8	Jordan Griffin	Submission (armbar)	LFA 34	March 2, 2018	2	3:59	Prior Lake, Minnesota, United States	
Win	20–7	Chuka Willis	Submission (guillotine choke)	Dynasty Combat Sports 38	December 9, 2017	1	2:45	Lincoln, Nebraska, United States	
Loss	19–7	Fernando Padilla	Submission (triangle armbar)	LFA 25	October 20, 2017	1	3:10	Omaha, Nebraska, United States	Return to Featherweight.
Win	19–6	Will Shutt	Submission (guillotine choke)	Victory FC 58	July 22, 2017	2	2:48	Omaha, Nebraska, United States	Lightweight debut.
Win	18–6	Justin Overton	Submission (guillotine choke)	Victory FC 57	May 5, 2017	1	1:20	Topeka, Kansas, United States	Featherweight bout.
Loss	17–6	Chico Camus	Decision (unanimous)	LFA 2	January 20, 2017	3	5:00	Prior Lake, Minnesota, United States	Catchweight (136.2 lb) bout; Minner missed weight.
Win	17–5	Zakk Smith	Submission (guillotine choke)	Dynasty Combat Sports 27	June 25, 2016	1	0:47	Nebraska City, Nebraska, United States	
Win	16–5	Bill Kamery	Submission (triangle choke)	Dynasty Combat Sports 25	April 23, 2016	1	4:35	Lincoln, Nebraska, United States	Catchweight (140 lb) bout.
Loss	15–5	Jesse Arnett	Submission (brabo choke)	Hard Knocks 48	January 29, 2016	2	1:56	Calgary, Alberta, Canada	For the HKFC Bantamweight Championship.
Win	15–4	Brandon Ball	Submission (armbar)	Dynasty Combat Sports 22	November 28, 2015	1	1:00	Lincoln, Nebraska, United States	Catchweight (143 lb) bout; Minner missed weight.
Win	14–4	Matt Brown	Submission (guillotine choke)	RFA 30	September 18, 2015	1	1:35	Lincoln, Nebraska, United States	
Win	13–4	Erik Vo	Submission (rear-naked choke)	Dynasty Combat Sports 17	June 27, 2015	1	1:31	Nebraska City, Nebraska, United States	Featherweight bout.
Win	12–4	Marvin Blumer	Decision (unanimous)	RFA 24	March 6, 2015	3	5:00	Prior Lake, Minnesota, United States	
Win	11–4	Shaine Moffitt	Submission (guillotine choke)	Dynasty Combat Sports 14	December 5, 2014	1	0:40	Tarkio, Missouri, United States	Featherweight bout.
Win	10–4	Jordan Hernandez	Submission (kneebar)	Dynasty Combat Sports 12	December 5, 2014	1	1:49	Lincoln, Nebraska, United States	Catchweight (141 lb) bout; Minner missed weight.
Loss	9–4	Luke Sanders	TKO (punches)	RFA 17	August 22, 2014	2	3:15	Sioux Falls, South Dakota, United States	Catchweight (137.2 lb) bout; Minner missed weight.
Win	9–3	Tony Crowder	Submission (guillotine choke)	Dynasty Combat Sports 9	June 21, 2014	1	0:33	Nebraska City, Nebraska, United States	
Win	8–3	Austin Lyons	Submission (armbar)	RFA 13	March 7, 2014	1	3:39	Lincoln, Nebraska, United States	Catchweight (139 lb) bout; Minner missed weight.
Loss	7–3	John DeVall	Submission (armbar)	Dynasty Combat Sports 6	January 11, 2014	1	4:38	Omaha, Nebraska, United States	Catchweight (140 lb) bout.
Win	7–2	William Osborne	Decision (unanimous)	RFA 10	October 25, 2013	3	5:00	Des Moines, Iowa, United States	
Win	6–2	Robert Flaherty	TKO (punches)	Dynasty Combat Sports 3	September 27, 2013	1	1:14	Omaha, Nebraska, United States	
Loss	5–2	Chad Obermiller	Submission (triangle choke)	Dynasty Combat Sports 1	July 26, 2013	1	3:22	Grand Island, Nebraska, United States	Return to Bantamweight.
Win	5–1	Justin Morrison	Submission (guillotine choke)	Disorderly Conduct 20	June 1, 2013	1	1:13	Nebraska City, Nebraska, United States	Featherweight debut.
Win	4–1	Adem Mujakic	Submission (guillotine choke)	Disorderly Conduct 18	April 12, 2013	1	2:04	Lincoln, Nebraska, United States	
Win	3–1	Hector Velez	Submission (guillotine choke)	Centurion Fights 1	March 1, 2013	1	1:07	St. Joseph, Missouri, United States	
Win	2–1	DeAndrew Jones	Submission (rear-naked choke)	Disorderly Conduct 15	January 26, 2013	1	2:21	Omaha, Nebraska, United States	
Win	1–1	James Smith	Submission (rear-naked choke)	Disorderly Conduct 14	December 14, 2012	1	0:25	Lincoln, Nebraska, United States	
Loss	0–1	Dominic Blanco	Submission (guillotine choke)	Disorderly Conduct 12	October 13, 2012	1	1:13	North Platte, Nebraska, United States	Bantamweight debut.

== See also ==
- List of male mixed martial artists
