= Legality of professional MMA competitions =

The following is a list of countries where mixed martial arts (MMA) are legal or not legal.

== Legality of professional MMA competitions by country ==
=== Americas ===
==== Brazil ====
January 17, 2013, saw the announcement that the Brazilian MMA Athletic Commission, or Comissao Atletica Brasileira de MMA (CABMMA), had joined the International MMA Federation. The CABMMA represents state federations across Brazil and is spearheaded by lawyers Giovanni Biscardi and Rafael Favettia, a former Executive Secretary of the Minister of Justice and Interim Minister of Justice. The CABMMA supervised its first event with "UFC on FX 7" on January 19, 2013, at Ibirapuera Gymnasium in São Paulo.

The CABMMA first hit international sports headlines when it suspended fighter Rousimar Palhares for prolonging a submission on opponent Mike Pierce, despite him tapping several times, during UFC Fight Night 29 in Barueri, Brazil on October 9, 2013. The CABMMA was called to preside over another controversial situation involving a Brazilian competitor, when Vitor Belfort's use of Testosterone Replacement Therapy came to light over UFC on FX 8 (May 18, 2013)

==== Canada ====
For many years, professional MMA competitions were illegal in Canada. Section 83(2) of the Canadian Criminal Code deemed that only boxing matches where only fists are used are considered legal. However most provinces regulated it by a provincial athletic commission (skirting S. 83(2) by classifying MMA as "mixed boxing"), such as the provinces of Manitoba, Ontario, Nova Scotia, Quebec, and Northwest Territories. The legality of MMA in the provinces of Alberta, British Columbia, and New Brunswick varies depending on the municipality. Professional MMA competitions remain illegal in the Canadian provinces of Newfoundland and Labrador, Prince Edward Island, Saskatchewan, Yukon, and Nunavut because it is not regulated by an athletic commission.

Canada formally decriminalized mixed martial arts with a vote on Bill S-209 on June 5, 2013. The bill formally gives provinces the power to create athletic commissions to regulate and sanction professional mixed martial arts bouts. Bill S-209 does not in and of itself make MMA legal across Canada; it allows provinces to make it legal on a province by province basis.

==== Mexico ====
MMA competitions began to be legalized in Mexico at the beginning of this century. The Federation of Mixed Martial Arts Equity and Fair Play, or Federación de Artes Marciales Mixtas Equidad y Juego Limpio (FAMM-EJL), was elected as the governing body representing Mexico under the International Federation, also being recognized by CONADE in March 2017.

==== United States ====
In the United States, professional MMA is overseen by the Association of Boxing Commissions. According to the Associations of Boxing Commissions, professional MMA competitions are allowed in all states. Alaska has no boxing or athletic commission. Montana has a state athletic commission, although it does not regulate MMA. However, MMA is legal in both states. West Virginia became the 44th state to regulate mixed martial arts on March 24, 2011. On March 8, 2012, Wyoming became the 45th state to regulate MMA. On May 4, 2012, it was announced that Vermont had become the 46th state to regulate MMA. Legislation allowing MMA in Connecticut came into effect on October 1, 2013, making it the 47th state to regulate the sport. On March 22, 2016, the New York State Assembly voted to lift the State's 1997 ban on MMA and on April 14, 2016, Governor Cuomo signed the bill legalizing and regulating the sport into law.

=== Asia ===
==== Bahrain ====
MMA is legal in Bahrain. Bahrain National MMA Federation (BNMMAF) has been set up under the patronage of Sheikh Khalid bin Hamad Al Khalifa and the jurisdiction of the Sports Minister Sheikh Nasser bin Hamad Al Khalifa. The development of MMA in the nation is convened through KHK MMA, which also owns Brave Combat Federation, which is the largest Mixed Martial Arts promotion in the Middle East. Bahrain will be hosting World MMA Amateurs Championship 2017 supported by International Mixed Martial Arts Federation.

==== Cambodia ====
In January 2013, the Cambodian Mixed Martial Arts Association was created under the Cambodian Martial Arts Federation. At this time there are no MMA events organized with the CMMAA approval. Television channel MYTV holds its KWC promotion under the sanctioning of the Cambodian Boxing Federation, responsible for sanctioning all boxing and Kun Khmer events in the country, in direct contrast to the situation in neighbouring Thailand.

==== China ====
The first professional mixed martial arts promotion was Art of War Fighting Championship which was founded by Andy Pi, a Chinese American BJJ practitioner. After defeating Xu Xiaodong in a televised MMA match he noticed the lack of formal rules, medical care or oversight which could have led to MMA and BJJ being banned in China so he came up with an idea to create a regulated professional MMA promotion. When setting up the promotion, Pi sought out grapplers to compete in it. He met Zhao Xuejun, a renowned Sanda coach who convinced Pi that he did not need to seek out pure grapplers and that Sanda fighters were just as capable of competing in MMA. Art of War I was held at the Beijing Sports University on November 6, 2005, making it the first professional MMA event to be held in China.

In 2011, the Ranik Ultimate Fighting Federation (RUFF) hosted the first MMA event in Shanghai sanctioned by China's governing body for combat sports, the Wushu Sports Management Center of the General Administration of Sport in China. RUFF formally crowned the first Chinese national MMA champions in 2013 with each champion receiving 1,000,000 RMB in prize money. Other MMA promotions in China include the 'Real Fight Championship', which has produced three events in Henan and Beijing.

==== India ====
The Indian Ministry of Youth Affairs and Sports has not recognized Mixed Martial Arts as a sport in India. There exist multiple bodies of association and federations which offer services to organize Mixed martial Arts events across India. Among them are MMAFI-Mixed Martial Arts Federation, India, All India Mixed Martial Arts Association (AIMMAA) and MMA India – National Sports Federation. Mixed Martial Arts events have been organized in India by Super Fight League, Brave Combat Federation, and Kumite 1 League. There is another emerging national MMA promotion in India called the 'Soul of Warriors MMA Fight Night'.

==== Japan ====
MMA competition has been legal in Japan since at least the mid-1980s, when Pancrase fights began to be held. There are several MMA-related organizations, including RIZIN FF, DEEP, Pancrase, Shooto, Fighting Nexus, Deep, Grachan and ZST.

==== Malaysia ====
In July 2013 the Malaysia Mixed Martial Arts Association (MASMMAA) was formally announced as the official national governing body for MMA in Malaysia, ahead of its formation in December 2013. MASMMAA is registered under the Malaysian Sports Development Act 1997 and recognized by the Commissioner of Sports, under the auspices of the office of the Youth & Sports Ministry. The federation comprises representatives of ten states out of fourteen in Malaysia. MASMMAA became affiliated to the International Mixed Martial Arts Federation in April 2014.

==== Nepal ====
The first amateur MMA match was held in Kathmandu, Nepal, on July 8, 2022. Nepal's own MMA promotion Nepal Warriors Championship, was founded in 2023. On June 16, 2023, they staged the first-ever professional fight.

==== Pakistan ====
In Pakistan, Mixed Martial Arts Pakistan organizes MMA events. The organization was founded in 2007 by veteran Pakistani MMA fighter Bashir Ahmad for promotion of MMA in Pakistan.

==== Taiwan ====
MMA is officially sanctioned by the government and sports authorities of Taiwan and numerous Taiwanese MMA fighters are currently training and competing at international level, with several in the UFC and other MMA organizations. Many major international MMA fights are held at stadiums in Taiwan every year. Additionally, many martial arts schools and gyms in Taiwan provide professional level MMA training.

==== Thailand ====
In 2012, the Sports Authority of Thailand banned competitions. It has been speculated that the Muay Thai industry played a factor in the Sports Authority of Thailand (SAT)'s final decision, as MMA could potentially take away business from Muay Thai. SAT Deputy Governor Sakol Wannapong has said "Organizing a MMA event here would hurt the image of Muay Thai, if you want to do this kind of business, you should do it in another country. Organizing MMA here could mislead the public into believing that Muay Thai is brutal."

Jussi Saloranta, the owner of Thailand's only MMA promotion, DARE Fight Sports, revealed that his lawyers found that the ban was actually premature, and that from a legal standpoint, there is no law banning mixed martial arts in the country, suggesting that the SAT's ban was more of a scare tactic. DARE continue to showcase events, informing fans only at the last minute through texts on the day of the event, and presenting the videos on YouTube as The Most Dangerous Gameshow. Saloranta has also helped set up the MMA Association of Thailand, in the hopes of reaching a compromise with SAT and regulating mixed martial arts in Thailand.

On September 12, 2013, DARE Fight Sports released a statement announcing SAT had removed the ban on MMA and would henceforth sanction the sport in Thailand.

Dare Fight Sports is currently the only MMA organization in Thailand to be officially sanctioned and publicized by the tourism authority of Thailand, although there are new MMA organizations appearing around the country.

==== Vietnam ====
On February 20, 2020, deputy minister of Internal Affairs, Tran Anh Tuan signed the legalisation of the MMA sport in Vietnam.

=== Europe ===
==== Belgium ====
MMA is tolerated in Belgium but not supported. In May 2012 the Belgian MMA Federation (BMMAF) was accepted by the International Mixed Martial Arts Federation as its third member, after several years of carrying out many of the tasks of a national federation under the former name of the Belgian Shooto and MMA Federation. Active in developing MMA in Belgium from 2005, the group later redefined their activities to include MMA in order to be able to use a cage. Registered as a federation in Belgium in 2006, the former Belgian Shooto and MMA Federation organized more than 1500 MMA bouts (Amateur, B class and A class), and built a structure for the sport nationally that included insurance, rules and regulation, and experience levels for fighters and technical seminars. The BMMAF has continued its activities as part of the wider MMA community under IMMAF.

==== Bulgaria ====
Appearing on professional basis around 2008–2009, MMA is a new sport in Bulgaria and growing rapidly. With a strong wrestling and boxing culture in the region, general interest in the sport is huge. However, it remains unregulated. The Bulgarian Federation for Mixed Martial Arts was elected as the national federation representing the Republic of Bulgaria under the International Mixed Martial Arts Federation in October 2014; and like all IMMAF members, is a non-profit, democratic organization. Established in November 2013 by 10 MMA clubs, the organization is headed by UFC competitor Stanislav Nedkov. The federation's registration to the Ministry of Justice was approved in June 2014 and its application for formal recognition by the Ministry of Sport is in its advanced stages.

==== Denmark ====
In Denmark, Mixed Martial Arts may be practiced but is not an official or legally regulated sport. On November 11, 2012, the voluntary Danish Mixed Martial Arts Federation held its first official general assembly in Odense, Denmark. There the DMMAF was officially founded and a board was elected headed up by President Claus Larsen. The Federation was publicly launched on Friday November 24, inviting Danish MMA organizations, gyms and academies to sign up as members. The DMMAF is working towards recognition under the Danish Sports Federation, Dansk Idræts Forbund. On November 25 the DMMAF's application to the International Mixed Martial Arts Federation was approved.

==== France ====
There remains political opposition to MMA in France and full contact MMA competition was banned until 2020. All bouts on French soil recorded as Mixed Martial Arts were in fact held under Pancrase rules and other variants (pankration, pempo, pankido). These bouts involved no striking on the ground as it was illegal in the country. The Commission nationale de Mixed Martial Arts (CNMMA) was founded as a non-profit organization for the development of MMA in 2009. The CNMMA had worked over four years to put an educational structure in place, including a technical system for the safe progression from grass-roots level, all the way up to the top professional level. Comprising 11 regional leagues working under regional technical advisers and teams, the CNMMA joined the International Mixed Martial Arts Federation (IMMAF) in March 2013 as the Commission française de Mixed Martial Arts (CFMMA). In 2012, CFMMA president Bertrand Amoussou ascended to the position of President of the International Mixed Martial Arts Federation. On June 24, 2019, Roxana Maracineanu, France's minister of sport announced the legalization of mixed martial arts as of January 1, 2020. On October 8, 2020, the country's first officially regulated MMA event, dubbed the Mixed Martial Arts Grand Prix, went ahead in Vitry-sur-Seine.

==== Ireland ====
The Irish Martial Arts Commission, which is recognized by the Irish Sports Council, does not include MMA among its recognized martial arts. The Department of Transport, Tourism and Sport does not recognise MMA as a sport. UFC Fight Night 46, featuring Conor McGregor, was held in Dublin in 2014.

Mixed Martial Arts Federation Ireland (MMAFI), intended as a federation for amateur MMA clubs, gained observer status at IMMAF in June 2012. MMAFI had a meeting in March 2013 with the Northern Ireland sports minister, Carál Ní Chuilín about the prospect of getting recognition from Sport Northern Ireland.

==== Norway ====
In Norway, professional MMA is illegal. Since 1981, all sports involving knockouts as a method of victory were banned but it was lifted for professional boxing in late 2014. Norwegian MMA fighters must therefore travel abroad to compete. The Norwegian MMA Federation (NMMAF) was elected as a full member of the International MMA Federation (IMMAF) on April 22, 2012, representing 49 member gyms across Norway.

In 2012 the "Merkekamper" concept was introduced by the NMMAF, with government sanctioning, which enables member MMA gyms to hold events with sparring matches, but governed by strict rules concerning how hard a fighter is permitted to strike.

On April 5, 2019, MMA was recognized by and welcomed into the Norwegian Martial Arts Federation (Norwegian Kampsportforbundet), a federation of the Norwegian Olympic and Paralympic Committee and Confederation of Sports (NIF) with the goal of growing the amateur sport.

==== Portugal ====
The FMMAP is recognized by the Portuguese government as a non-profit sports federation and oversees Amateur MMA competition and coaching nationally. Based in Vila do Conde, the Federação de Mixed Martial Arts de Portugal (FMMAP) was founded as a collaborative effort between six existing non-profit organizations in 2012, as Portugal's first dedicated MMA Federation. This is in line with government requirements for all sport federations in Portugal which stipulates that they consist of at least three associated, non-profit groups. The composite FMMAP organisations are all involved in the coaching and promotion of MMA with a shared goal for the amateur sport, but come from various martial arts that include karate, kickboxing, Muay Thai, pankration athlima, mixed martial arts, Jeet Kune Do, freestyle martial arts, Brazilian jiu-jitsu and wrestling. Affiliated groups at launch were AAMU – Associação Artes Marciais, Associação de Artes Marciais e Desportos de Combate (Açores), Associação Areagon (Chaves City), Associação Mirandelense de Artes Orientais (Mirandela City), Associação Portuguesa de Ciências de Combate/JKD Unlimited Portugal (Lisbon City), KMD MMA system (Porto City), Barcelos Gym (Barcelos City). The FMMAP is affiliated to the International Mixed Martial Arts Federation (IMMAF).

==== Romania ====
The Romanian Mixed Martial Arts Federation (RMMAF) was established in 2012 as a legal non-profit federation under the Ministry of Youth and Sport in Romania. The Federation was formed by the board of MMA organization AGON and backed by a broad representation of the Romanian MMA community, including around twenty MMA clubs and non-profit MMA organizations around the country. Based in Bucharest, Romania AGON club was founded in its present legal form in June 2012, following a long period of time of acting under different other organisations, with Gheorghe Stanciu elected as its president. The RMMAF is affiliated to the International Mixed Martial Arts Federation (IMMAF).

==== Russia ====
In September 2012, MMA was given 'National Sport' status in Russia, and on the same day fighter and M-1 Global promoter Fedor Emelianenko was appointed to the role of Russian MMA Union president.

==== Sweden ====
MMA competition is legal and under the purview of the Swedish Mixed Martial Arts Federation (SMMAF), which was formed in 2007 and began overseeing MMA events and governing the sport as a whole in 2008. In 2009 the SMMAF was accepted into the Association of Swedish Budo and Martial Arts Federation, thus granting MMA "national sport" status and making its approved clubs eligible for partial government subsidization. On April 30, 2011, the SMMAF sanctioned the first event under its purview to utilize the Unified Rules of Mixed Martial Arts. The Swedish Mixed Martial Arts Federation governs the sport of MMA in Sweden as a member affiliated to the International Mixed Martial Arts Federation.

The SMMAF hit the headlines when it withdrew Swedish headliner, Alexander Gustafsson, from competing at UFC on FUEL 9 in Sweden (April 6, 2013), due to a facial laceration.

=== Oceania ===
==== Australia ====
MMA in Australia is permitted in all states and territories of Australia by various combat sports authorities and organizations. There is debate about the use of the cage, which was banned in Victoria in 2007 and then relegalized in 2015. The cage was banned in Western Australia in 2013, but its use was again permitted in 2017.
