= 2019 in Legacy Fighting Alliance =

Information
- Promotion: Legacy Fighting Alliance
- First date aired: January 18, 2019
- Last date aired: November 22, 2019

2019 was the third year in the history of Legacy Fighting Alliance, a mixed martial arts promotion based in the United States.

== Event list ==
=== Legacy Fighting Alliance 57: Zalal vs. Mariscal ===
Legacy Fighting Alliance 57: Zalal vs. Mariscal
- Promotion: Legacy Fighting Alliance
- Date: January 18, 2019
- Venue: 1stBank Center
- City: Broomfield, Colorado, U.S.

Event chronology
| Legacy Fighting Alliance 56: Hubbard vs. Mota | Legacy Fighting Alliance 57: Zalal vs. Mariscal | Legacy Fighting Alliance 58: Park vs. Willis |

Legacy Fighting Alliance 57: Zalal vs. Mariscal was the fifty-eighth event of Legacy Fighting Alliance and took place on January 18, 2019. It aired on AXS TV.

Results

Main Card
| Weight class | | | | Method | Round | Time | Notes |
|---|---|---|---|---|---|---|---|
| Featherweight | Jose Mariscal | def. | Youssef Zalal | Decision (unanimous) | 3 | 5:00 |
| Welterweight | Anthony Adams | def. | Josh Cavan | TKO (punches) | 1 | 4:56 |
| Middleweight | Adam Stroup | def. | Lucas Rota | Decision (unanimous) | 3 | 5:00 |
| Welterweight | Austin Jones | def. | Calen Born | Decision (unanimous) | 3 | 5:00 |
| Lightweight | Jonathan Wyderko | def. | Matt Johnson | KO (knee) | 1 | 3:21 |
| Women's Strawweight | Pauline Macias | def. | Madaline Meacham | TKO (verbal submission) | 2 | 1:18 |
| Middleweight | Taylor Johnson | def. | Aaron Chambers | TKO (punches) | 1 | 2:43 |
Preliminary Card
| Women's Flyweight | Ashley Deen | def. | Salina Rowland | TKO (doctor stoppage) | 2 | 1:48 |
| Bantamweight | A.J. Robb | def. | Chance Chin | Submission (rear-naked choke) | 2 | 2:08 |
Amateur Bouts
| Women's Featherweight | Carmen Sage | def. | Stacy Salazar | Decision (unanimous) | 3 | 3:00 |
| Featherweight | Jordan Molina | def. | Jota Ninomiya | Disqualification (illegal knee) | 2 | 0:43 |
| Flyweight | Llorrvic Acevedo | def. | Daniel Aggrey | Submission (rear-naked choke) | 1 | 2:39 |

=== Legacy Fighting Alliance 58: Park vs. Willis ===
Legacy Fighting Alliance 58: Park vs. Willis
- Promotion: Legacy Fighting Alliance
- Date: January 25, 2019
- Venue: Route 66 Casino Hotel
- City: Albuquerque, New Mexico, U.S.

Event chronology
| Legacy Fighting Alliance 57: Zalal vs. Mariscal | Legacy Fighting Alliance 58: Park vs. Willis | Legacy Fighting Alliance 59: Michaud vs. Aguilera |

Legacy Fighting Alliance 58: Park vs. Willis was the fifty-ninth event of Legacy Fighting Alliance and took place on January 25, 2019. It aired on AXS TV.

Results

Main Card
| Weight class | | | | Method | Round | Time | Notes |
|---|---|---|---|---|---|---|---|
| Lightweight | Harvey Park | def. | Jaleel Willis | TKO (punches) | 1 | 3:17 |
| Flyweight | Joby Sanchez | def. | Demetrius Wilson | Decision (unanimous) | 3 | 5:00 |
| Lightweight | Fernando Padilla | def. | Donald Sanchez | TKO (punches) | 2 | 1:27 |
| Featherweight | Toninho Gavinho | def. | Vince Fricilone | KO (knee) | 1 | 0:40 |
| Lightweight | Flavian Pilgrim | def. | Sherwin Price | KO (punch) | 1 | 0:50 |
| Welterweight | Maycon Mendonça | def. | Joshua Moreno | Decision (unanimous) | 3 | 5:00 |
| Featherweight | Natan Levy | def. | Henry Barahona | Decision (unanimous) | 3 | 5:00 |
Preliminary Card
| Flyweight | Javier Cepeda | def. | Ricky Esquibel | Decision (unanimous) | 3 | 5:00 |
| Welterweight | Jalin Fuller | def. | Andrew Lipp | Decision (unanimous) | 3 | 5:00 |

=== Legacy Fighting Alliance 59: Michaud vs. Aguilera ===
Legacy Fighting Alliance 59: Michaud vs. Aguilera
- Promotion: Legacy Fighting Alliance
- Date: February 1, 2019
- Venue: Comerica Theater
- City: Phoenix, Arizona, U.S.

Event chronology
| Legacy Fighting Alliance 58: Park vs. Willis | Legacy Fighting Alliance 59: Michaud vs. Aguilera | Legacy Fighting Alliance 60: Anglickas vs. York |

Legacy Fighting Alliance 59: Michaud vs. Aguilera was the sixtieth event of Legacy Fighting Alliance and took place on February 1, 2019. It aired on AXS TV.

Results

Main Card
| Weight class | | | | Method | Round | Time | Notes |
|---|---|---|---|---|---|---|---|
| Welterweight | David Michaud | def. | Christian Aguilera | TKO (punches) | 1 | 4:14 |
| Welterweight | Jared Gooden | def. | Steven Newell | Decision (unanimous) | 3 | 5:00 |
| Middleweight | Daniel Madrid | def. | Seth Baczynski | Submission (guillotine choke) | 1 | 2:54 |
| Bantamweight | Kevin Natividad | def. | Andy Perez | Decision (split) | 3 | 5:00 |
| Bantamweight | Kyler Phillips | def. | Emeka Ifekandu | TKO (head kick and punches) | 1 | 2:30 |
| Bantamweight | Hunter Azure | def. | Jaime Hernandez | TKO (body kick and punches) | 1 | 2:15 |
Preliminary Card
| Bantamweight | Justin Hughes | def. | JR Cortez | Decision (split) | 3 | 5:00 |
| Middleweight | Jered Gwerder | def. | Anthony Rozema | TKO (punches) | 1 | 1:10 |
Amateur Bouts
| Welterweight | Ray Waters | def. | Nick Hawkins | Decision (split) | 3 | 3:00 |

=== Legacy Fighting Alliance 60: Anglickas vs. York ===
Legacy Fighting Alliance 60: Anglickas vs. York
- Promotion: Legacy Fighting Alliance
- Date: February 15, 2019
- Venue: 7 Flags Event Center
- City: Clive, Iowa, U.S.

Event chronology
| Legacy Fighting Alliance 59: Michaud vs. Aguilera | Legacy Fighting Alliance 60: Anglickas vs. York | Legacy Fighting Alliance 61: Allen vs. Murrietta |

Legacy Fighting Alliance 60: Anglickas vs. York was the sixty-first event of Legacy Fighting Alliance and took place on February 15, 2019. It aired on AXS TV.

Results

Main Card
| Weight class | | | | Method | Round | Time | Notes |
|---|---|---|---|---|---|---|---|
| Light Heavyweight | Julius Anglickas | def. | Clayton York | Submission (rear-naked choke) | 2 | 4:13 | (Note: For the vacant LFA Light Heavyweight Championship.) |
| Lightweight | Trey Ogden | def. | Anthony Baccam | Decision (unanimous) | 3 | 5:00 |
| Featherweight | Luis Saldaña | def. | Carl Wittstock | Submission (rear-naked choke) | 2 | 4:38 |
| Welterweight | Darrius Flowers | def. | Jonathon Thomson | TKO (knees) | 1 | 0:48 |
| Lightweight | Dakota Bush | def. | Jordin Hinman | Submission (rear-naked choke) | 1 | 2:05 |
| Heavyweight | Patrick Martin | def. | Byron Stevens | TKO (punches) | 1 | 0:31 |
Preliminary Card
| Featherweight | Cain Lugar | def. | Ali Omar | KO (punch) | 3 | 0:10 |
Amateur Bouts
| Featherweight | Colton Hamm | def. | Spencer Wray | Decision (unanimous) | 3 | 3:00 |
| Lightweight | Zach Oviatt | def. | Christian Jones | KO (head kick) | 1 | 4:59 |
| Women's Bantamweight | Liz Goodman | def. | Jordan Mott | TKO (punches) | 1 | 0:49 |

=== Legacy Fighting Alliance 61: Allen vs. Murrietta ===
Legacy Fighting Alliance 61: Allen vs. Murrietta
- Promotion: Legacy Fighting Alliance
- Date: February 22, 2019
- Venue: Mystic Lake Casino Hotel
- City: Prior Lake, Minnesota, U.S.

Event chronology
| Legacy Fighting Alliance 60: Anglickas vs. York | Legacy Fighting Alliance 61: Allen vs. Murrietta | Legacy Fighting Alliance 62: Kenney vs. Cachero |

Legacy Fighting Alliance 61: Allen vs. Murrietta was the sixty-second event of Legacy Fighting Alliance and took place on February 22, 2019. It aired on AXS TV.

Results

Main Card
| Weight class | | | | Method | Round | Time | Notes |
|---|---|---|---|---|---|---|---|
| Middleweight | Brendan Allen (c) | def. | Moses Murrietta | Decision (unanimous) | 5 | 5:00 | (Note: For the LFA Middleweight Championship.) |
| Featherweight | Nate Jennerman | def. | Ken Beverly | Decision (majority) | 3 | 5:00 |
| Flyweight | Sid Bice | def. | Lloyd McKinney | Decision (unanimous) | 3 | 5:00 |
| Featherweight | Jake Childers | def. | Josh Marsh | Decision (unanimous) | 3 | 5:00 |
| Welterweight | Nick Ammerman | def. | Dionisio Ramirez | Decision (unanimous) | 3 | 5:00 |
Preliminary Card
| Middleweight | Joel Bauman | def. | Brock Smith | Decision (unanimous) | 3 | 5:00 |
| Bantamweight | Sean Strube | def. | Jason Huntley | TKO (punches) | 1 | 1:37 |
| Bantamweight | Sean Stebbins | def. | Eric Kemper | Decision (unanimous) | 3 | 5:00 |
Amateur Bouts
| Lightweight | Yamah Sadozai | def. | Dustin Klapperick | TKO (punches) | 1 | 0:22 |
| Women's Flyweight | Jordan Nickelatti | def. | Shannon Clark | TKO (doctor stoppage) | 2 | 3:00 |
| Featherweight | Kyle Zimick | def. | Hayden Buckner | TKO (punches) | 2 | 0:46 |
| Welterweight | Joey Hart | def. | Brady Minner | Decision (split) | 3 | 3:00 |
| Bantamweight | Tyus White | def. | Grant Bolduan | Decision (unanimous) | 3 | 3:00 |

=== Legacy Fighting Alliance 62: Kenney vs. Cachero ===
Legacy Fighting Alliance 62: Kenney vs. Cachero
- Promotion: Legacy Fighting Alliance
- Date: March 22, 2019
- Venue: The Bomb Factory
- City: Dallas, Texas, U.S.

Event chronology
| Legacy Fighting Alliance 61: Allen vs. Murrietta | Legacy Fighting Alliance 62: Kenney vs. Cachero | Legacy Fighting Alliance 63: Krantz vs. Patterson |

Legacy Fighting Alliance 62: Kenney vs. Cachero was the sixty-third event of Legacy Fighting Alliance and took place on March 22, 2019. It aired on AXS TV.

Results

Main Card
| Weight class | | | | Method | Round | Time | Notes |
|---|---|---|---|---|---|---|---|
| Bantamweight | Casey Kenney | def. | Vincent Cachero | TKO (knee) | 1 | 1:38 | (Note: For the interim LFA Bantamweight Championship.) |
| Bantamweight | Levi Mowles | def. | Ahmet Kayretli | Submission (rear-naked choke) | 3 | 4:21 |
| Welterweight | Ramiz Brahimaj | def. | Carlos Martinez | Submission (arm-triangle choke) | 1 | 0:55 |
| Bantamweight | Cody Freeman | def. | Fernie Garcia | Decision (split) | 3 | 5:00 |
| Women's Strawweight | Vanessa Demopoulos | def. | Valerie Ann Marie Soto | Decision (majority) | 3 | 5:00 |
| Featherweight | Austin Lingo | def. | Angel Luis Cruz | Submission (rear-naked choke) | 1 | 0:25 |
Preliminary Card
| Flyweight | Victor Altamirano | def. | Marquis Smith | TKO (punches) | 1 | 1:58 |
| Featherweight | Elijah Johns | def. | Michael Martinez | TKO (knees and punches) | 1 | 1:12 |
Amateur Bouts
| Women's Strawweight | Destiny Oldenkamp | def. | Amber Medina | TKO (punches) | 1 | 1:53 |
| Lightweight | Don Doyle | def. | Jaccob Charles | Decision (unanimous) | 3 | 3:00 |
| Featherweight | Andrew Duarte | def. | Eric Gonzales | Decision (split) | 3 | 3:00 |

=== Legacy Fighting Alliance 63: Krantz vs. Patterson ===
Legacy Fighting Alliance 63: Krantz vs. Patterson
- Promotion: Legacy Fighting Alliance
- Date: March 29, 2019
- Venue: Bell County Expo Center
- City: Belton, Texas, U.S.

Event chronology
| Legacy Fighting Alliance 62: Kenney vs. Cachero | Legacy Fighting Alliance 63: Krantz vs. Patterson | Legacy Fighting Alliance 64: Park vs. Jackson |

Legacy Fighting Alliance 63: Krantz vs. Patterson was the sixty-fourth event of Legacy Fighting Alliance and took place on March 29, 2019. It aired on AXS TV.

Results

Main Card
| Weight class | | | | Method | Round | Time | Notes |
|---|---|---|---|---|---|---|---|
| Welterweight | Derrick Krantz | def. | Justin Patterson | KO (punches) | 1 | 2:27 |
| Featherweight | Gabriel Silva | def. | Jake Heffernan | KO (punch) | 1 | 1:23 |
| Women's Flyweight | Hailey Cowan | def. | Sarah Click | Technical Submission (rear-naked choke) | 2 | 1:29 |
| Featherweight | Rafael Barbosa | def. | Cameron Graves | Decision (unanimous) | 3 | 5:00 |
| Bantamweight | Armando Villarreal | def. | Devin Miller | TKO (punches) | 3 | 0:16 |
| Middleweight | Kailan Hill | def. | Jhonoven Pati | Decision (unanimous) | 3 | 5:00 |
Preliminary Card
| Welterweight | Nico Echeverry | def. | Steven Jones | TKO (head kick and punches) | 3 | 3:27 |
| Lightweight | Michael Murphy | def. | Phillip Platt | KO (punch) | 1 | 0:15 |
Amateur Bouts
| Women's Flyweight | Katelyn Nicado | def. | Veronica Garcia | Decision (split) | 3 | 3:00 |
| Women's Atomweight | Melissa McCue | def. | Sarah Foster | Submission (triangle choke) | 2 | 1:33 |
| Bantamweight | Steffin Barrera | def. | Jessie Fabila | Submission (guillotine choke) | 1 | 2:42 |

=== Legacy Fighting Alliance 64: Park vs. Jackson ===
Legacy Fighting Alliance 64: Park vs. Jackson
- Promotion: Legacy Fighting Alliance
- Date: April 26, 2019
- Venue: Sanford Pentagon
- City: Sioux Falls, South Dakota, U.S.

Event chronology
| Legacy Fighting Alliance 63: Krantz vs. Patterson | Legacy Fighting Alliance 64: Park vs. Jackson | Legacy Fighting Alliance 65: Royval vs. Sanchez |

Legacy Fighting Alliance 64: Park vs. Jackson was the sixty-fifth event of Legacy Fighting Alliance and took place on April 26, 2019. It aired on AXS TV.

Results

Main Card
| Weight class | | | | Method | Round | Time | Notes |
|---|---|---|---|---|---|---|---|
| Lightweight | Harvey Park | def. | Demarques Jackson | TKO (elbows and punches) | 1 | 4:58 | (Note: For the vacant LFA Lightweight Championship.) |
| Catchweight (180 lbs) | Jason Jackson | def. | Scott Futrell | Submission (arm-triangle choke) | 2 | 4:07 |
| Welterweight | Bobby Lee | def. | Jordon Larson | Submission (rear-naked choke) | 2 | 4:35 |
| Lightweight | Bryce Logan | def. | Kenneth Glenn | Decision (split) | 3 | 5:00 |
| Heavyweight | Ryan Debelak | def. | Brian Peterson | Decision (unanimous) | 3 | 5:00 |
| Welterweight | Tyler Ray | def. | Sam Garrett | Submission (arm-triangle choke) | 2 | 4:31 |
Preliminary Card
| Flyweight | Delfino Benitez | def. | Robiel Tesfaldet | Decision (split) | 3 | 5:00 |
| Lightweight | Tyler Mathison | def. | Keith Phathaem | Decision (unanimous) | 3 | 5:00 |
Amateur Bouts
| Featherweight | Elliott Jurries | def. | Ricky Ortiz | TKO (punches) | 1 | 2:26 |
| Flyweight | Abel Bubuli | def. | Colin Birzer | Submission (triangle choke) | 1 | 1:58 |

=== Legacy Fighting Alliance 65: Royval vs. Sanchez ===
Legacy Fighting Alliance 65: Royval vs. Sanchez
- Promotion: Legacy Fighting Alliance
- Date: May 3, 2019
- Venue: Dobson Arena
- City: Vail, Colorado, U.S.

Event chronology
| Legacy Fighting Alliance 64: Park vs. Jackson | Legacy Fighting Alliance 65: Royval vs. Sanchez | Legacy Fighting Alliance 66: Diamond vs. Neal |

Legacy Fighting Alliance 65: Royval vs. Sanchez was the sixty-sixth event of Legacy Fighting Alliance and took place on May 3, 2019. It aired on AXS TV.

Results

Main Card
| Weight class | | | | Method | Round | Time | Notes |
|---|---|---|---|---|---|---|---|
| Flyweight | Brandon Royval | def. | Joby Sanchez | Submission (armbar) | 1 | 3:17 |
| Featherweight | Joanderson Brito | def. | Jose Mariscal | KO (punch) | 1 | 0:44 |
| Featherweight | Matt Jones | def. | Youssef Zalal | Decision (split) | 3 | 5:00 |
| Women's Strawweight | Pauline Macias | def. | Sarah Shell | Decision (unanimous) | 3 | 5:00 |
| Middleweight | Adam Stroup | def. | Hayward Charles | Decision (unanimous) | 3 | 5:00 |
| Bantamweight | Adam Martinez | def. | Cory Galloway | Submission (guillotine choke) | 3 | 2:35 |
Preliminary Card
| Featherweight | Daniel Argueta | def. | Max Rojas | TKO (punches) | 1 | 3:48 |
Amateur Bouts
| Women's Bantamweight | Carmen Sage | def. | Tayler Sprowl | Decision (split) | 3 | 3:00 |
| Catchweight (165 lbs) | Anthony Pineda | def. | Matthew Powers | TKO (punches) | 3 | 0:26 |
| Catchweight (150 lbs) | Jota Ninomiya | def. | Daniel Nieto | TKO (strikes) | 2 | 0:18 |

=== Legacy Fighting Alliance 66: Diamond vs. Neal ===
Legacy Fighting Alliance 66: Diamond vs. Neal
- Promotion: Legacy Fighting Alliance
- Date: May 10, 2019
- Venue: Maverik Center
- City: West Valley City, Utah, U.S.

Event chronology
| Legacy Fighting Alliance 65: Royval vs. Sanchez | Legacy Fighting Alliance 66: Diamond vs. Neal | Legacy Fighting Alliance 67: James vs. Martin |

Legacy Fighting Alliance 66: Diamond vs. Neal was the sixty-seventh event of Legacy Fighting Alliance and took place on May 10, 2019. It aired on AXS TV.

Results

Main Card
| Weight class | | | | Method | Round | Time | Notes |
|---|---|---|---|---|---|---|---|
| Featherweight | Tyler Diamond | def. | Jon Neal | Decision (unanimous) | 3 | 5:00 |
| Welterweight | William Macário | def. | Josh Burkman | Decision (split) | 3 | 5:00 |
| Featherweight | Andrew Tenneson | def. | Westin Wilson | Submission (gogoplata) | 1 | 4:29 |
| Light Heavyweight | Emilio Trevino | def. | Joe Rodriguez | Decision (unanimous) | 3 | 5:00 |
| Lightweight | Fabio Serrao | def. | Bobby King | Decision (unanimous) | 3 | 5:00 |
| Women's Flyweight | Lisa Mauldin | def. | Kaytlin Neil | Decision (split) | 3 | 5:00 |
| Bantamweight | Hunter Azure | def. | LJ Schulz | Decision (unanimous) | 3 | 5:00 |
Preliminary Card
| Light Heavyweight | Kenneth Seegrist | def. | Zac Cavender | TKO (spinning backfist) | 1 | 0:48 |
| Middleweight | Jered Gwerder | def. | Marco Sanchez | KO (head kick) | 1 | 1:12 |

=== Legacy Fighting Alliance 67: James vs. Martin ===
Legacy Fighting Alliance 67: James vs. Martin
- Promotion: Legacy Fighting Alliance
- Date: May 24, 2019
- Venue: Branson Convention Center
- City: Branson, Missouri, U.S.

Event chronology
| Legacy Fighting Alliance 66: Diamond vs. Neal | Legacy Fighting Alliance 67: James vs. Martin | Legacy Fighting Alliance 68: Jennerman vs. Barbosa |

Legacy Fighting Alliance 67: James vs. Martin was the sixty-eighth event of Legacy Fighting Alliance and took place on May 24, 2019. It aired on AXS TV.

Results

Main Card
| Weight class | | | | Method | Round | Time | Notes |
|---|---|---|---|---|---|---|---|
| Heavyweight | Daniel James | def. | Patrick Martin | TKO (punches) | 1 | 4:45 |
| Lightweight | Jaleel Willis | def. | Dakota Bush | Decision (unanimous) | 3 | 5:00 |
| Featherweight | T.J. Brown | def. | Ken Beverly | KO (head kick) | 1 | 1:45 |
| Featherweight | Solo Hatley Jr. | def. | TeeJay Britton | TKO (punches) | 1 | 2:00 |
| Welterweight | Mike Breeden | def. | Chel Erwin-Davis | KO (body punch) | 3 | 1:24 |
| Bantamweight | Ronnie Lawrence | def. | Garrett Armfield | Decision (unanimous) | 3 | 5:00 |
Preliminary Card
| Middleweight | Kyron Bowen | def. | Marco Hutch | Submission (armbar) | 2 | 2:50 |
| Middleweight | Bradley Toth | def. | Rance Foust | KO (left hook) | 2 | 4:50 |
Amateur Bouts
| Featherweight | Quinten Davidson | def. | David Hemphill | Decision (unanimous) | 3 | 3:00 |
| Featherweight | Samuel Robinson | def. | Kyle Campbell | TKO (punches) | 1 | 2:03 |
| Bantamweight | Andy Rice | def. | Jaden Batson | Decision (unanimous) | 3 | 3:00 |

=== Legacy Fighting Alliance 68: Jennerman vs. Barbosa ===
Legacy Fighting Alliance 68: Jennerman vs. Barbosa
- Promotion: Legacy Fighting Alliance
- Date: May 31, 2019
- Venue: Mystic Lake Casino Hotel
- City: Prior Lake, Minnesota, U.S.

Event chronology
| Legacy Fighting Alliance 67: James vs. Martin | Legacy Fighting Alliance 68: Jennerman vs. Barbosa | Legacy Fighting Alliance 69: Pérez vs. Moreno |

Legacy Fighting Alliance 68: Jennerman vs. Barbosa was the sixty-ninth event of Legacy Fighting Alliance and took place on May 31, 2019. It aired on AXS TV.

Results

Main Card
| Weight class | | | | Method | Round | Time | Notes |
|---|---|---|---|---|---|---|---|
| Featherweight | Rafael Barbosa | def. | Nate Jennerman | KO (elbow) | 1 | 3:18 |
| Bantamweight | Raufeon Stots | def. | Ralph Acosta | Decision (unanimous) | 3 | 5:00 |
| Welterweight | Maycon Mendonça | def. | Bobby Lee | Decision (unanimous) | 3 | 5:00 |
| Light Heavyweight | Mike Rhodes | def. | Cristhian Torres | Decision (unanimous) | 3 | 5:00 |
| Welterweight | J.P. Saint Louis | def. | Derek Varin | Submission (rear-naked choke) | 1 | 4:52 |
| Welterweight | Le'Ville Simpson | def. | Tyler Mathison | Decision (split) | 3 | 5:00 |
| Middleweight | Joel Bauman | def. | Bobby Downs | KO (head kick) | 1 | 2:48 |
Preliminary Card
| Welterweight | Nelly Thompson | def. | Craig Eckelberg | Disqualification (illegal knee) | 2 | 2:01 |
Amateur Bouts
| Heavyweight | Thomas Petersen | def. | Keefer Bender | TKO (strikes) | 3 | 1:35 |
| Welterweight | Tim Garrett | def. | Joey Hart | Submission (heel hook) | 1 | 1:17 |
| Middleweight | Cooper Hayes | def. | Mike Waltz | Decision (unanimous) | 3 | 3:00 |
| Women's Strawweight | Shannon Clark | def. | Annabel Kelly | Decision (split) | 3 | 3:00 |
| Lightweight | Dick Lemus | def. | Nick Krohn | TKO (strikes) | 2 | 2:56 |
| Catchweight (140 lbs) | Grant Bolduan | def. | Bryan Baumgart | TKO (strikes) | 2 | 1:49 |
| Lightweight | Davi Young | def. | Steven Rodriguez | TKO (strikes) | 1 | 0:47 |
| Flyweight | Joshua Clark | def. | Ricky Field | Submission (rear-naked choke) | 2 | 0:38 |
| Catchweight (178 lbs) | Joshua Stephenson | def. | Pengi Mboma | TKO (punches) | 1 | 2:13 |

=== Legacy Fighting Alliance 69: Pérez vs. Moreno ===
Legacy Fighting Alliance 69: Pérez vs. Moreno
- Promotion: Legacy Fighting Alliance
- Date: June 7, 2019
- Venue: Morongo Casino, Resort & Spa
- City: Cabazon, California, U.S.

Event chronology
| Legacy Fighting Alliance 68: Jennerman vs. Barbosa | Legacy Fighting Alliance 69: Pérez vs. Moreno | Legacy Fighting Alliance 70: Ferreira vs. Martin |

Legacy Fighting Alliance 69: Pérez vs. Moreno was the seventieth event of Legacy Fighting Alliance and took place on June 7, 2019. It aired on AXS TV.

Results

Main Card
| Weight class | | | | Method | Round | Time | Notes |
|---|---|---|---|---|---|---|---|
| Flyweight | Brandon Moreno | def. | Maikel Pérez (c) | TKO (punches) | 4 | 1:54 | (Note: For the LFA Flyweight Championship.) |
| Lightweight | Arthur Estrázulas | def. | Steve Kozola | Submission (rear-naked choke) | 1 | 2:32 |
| Bantamweight | Desmond Torres | def. | Jose Medina | Submission (arm-triangle choke) | 3 | 1:23 |
| Bantamweight | Kyle Estrada | def. | Ricky Furar | KO (leg kick) | 2 | 0:19 |
| Women's Strawweight | Vanessa Demopoulos | def. | Nadine Mandiau | Submission (armbar) | 1 | 2:37 |
| Featherweight | Natan Levy | def. | Nick Badis | Decision (unanimous) | 3 | 5:00 |
Preliminary Card
| Lightweight | Jean-Paul Le-Bosnoyani | def. | Skyler Hicks | TKO (strikes) | 1 | 2:10 |
Postliminary Card
| Lightweight | Brandon Hastings | def. | Jose Campos | TKO (doctor stoppage) | 3 | 1:14 |

=== Legacy Fighting Alliance 70: Ferreira vs. Martin ===
Legacy Fighting Alliance 70: Ferreira vs. Martin
- Promotion: Legacy Fighting Alliance
- Date: June 28, 2019
- Venue: The Sylvee
- City: Madison, Wisconsin, U.S.

Event chronology
| Legacy Fighting Alliance 69: Pérez vs. Moreno | Legacy Fighting Alliance 70: Ferreira vs. Martin | Legacy Fighting Alliance 71: Jackson vs. Souza |

Legacy Fighting Alliance 70: Ferreira vs. Martin was the seventy-first event of Legacy Fighting Alliance and took place on June 28, 2019. It aired on AXS TV.

Results

Main Card
| Weight class | | | | Method | Round | Time | Notes |
|---|---|---|---|---|---|---|---|
| Heavyweight | Brett Martin | def. | Renan Ferreira | Disqualification (illegal strikes) | 1 | 3:21 |
| Welterweight | Mark Lemminger | def. | Isaac Steele | Submission (guillotine choke) | 2 | 3:14 |
| Featherweight | Jake Childers | def. | Jamey Simmons | KO (knee) | 1 | 0:13 |
| Welterweight | Dante Schiro | def. | Rmandel Cameron | Decision (unanimous) | 3 | 5:00 |
| Flyweight | Lloyd McKinney | def. | Gonzalo Ponce | Submission (triangle choke) | 1 | 2:43 |
| Light Heavyweight | Alex Polizzi | def. | Pierre Walters | TKO (punches) | 1 | 3:27 |
Preliminary Card
| Featherweight | Collin Anglin | def. | Morgan Sickinger | TKO (strikes) | 1 | 0:14 |
| Catchweight (165 lbs) | Austin Lutchen | def. | Andrew Kauzlaric | TKO (punches) | 1 | N/A |
Amateur Bouts
| Lightweight | Rodney Alexander | def. | Devon Seitz | Decision (split) | 3 | 3:00 |
| Featherweight | Wyatt Barber | def. | Julian Valencia | TKO (punches) | 1 | 1:35 |
| Catchweight (165 lbs) | Jordan Schulte | def. | Peter Kulibert | TKO (punches) | 2 | 1:09 |
| Flyweight | Cody Linne | def. | Peter Lo | Decision (split) | 3 | 3:00 |

=== Legacy Fighting Alliance 71: Jackson vs. Souza ===
Legacy Fighting Alliance 71: Jackson vs. Souza
- Promotion: Legacy Fighting Alliance
- Date: July 12, 2019
- Venue: Coca-Cola Roxy Theatre
- City: Atlanta, Georgia, U.S.

Event chronology
| Legacy Fighting Alliance 70: Ferreira vs. Martin | Legacy Fighting Alliance 71: Jackson vs. Souza | Legacy Fighting Alliance 72: Madrid vs. Harris |

Legacy Fighting Alliance 71: Jackson vs. Souza was the seventy-second event of Legacy Fighting Alliance and took place on July 12, 2019. It aired on AXS TV.

Results

Main Card
| Weight class | | | | Method | Round | Time | Notes |
|---|---|---|---|---|---|---|---|
| Welterweight | Jason Jackson | def. | Hemerson Souza | Decision (split) | 5 | 5:00 | (Note: For the vacant LFA Welterweight Championship.) |
| Welterweight | Hugh Pulley | def. | Demarques Jackson | Decision (split) | 3 | 5:00 |
| Bantamweight | Ary Farias | def. | Devante Sewell | Technical Submission (rear-naked choke) | 1 | 4:58 |
| Middleweight | Gregory Rodrigues | def. | Tanner Saraceno | Decision (unanimous) | 3 | 5:00 |
| Welterweight | Tyler Ray | def. | Pedro Paulino | Decision (unanimous) | 3 | 5:00 |
| Catchweight (160 lbs) | Robert Hale | def. | Zach Fears | Decision (unanimous) | 3 | 5:00 |
| Catchweight (160 lbs) | Chris Brown | def. | Yemi Oduwole | TKO (head kick and punch) | 2 | 1:38 |
Preliminary Card
| Lightweight | Clay Harvison | def. | Mike Barnett | Decision (unanimous) | 3 | 5:00 |
| Middleweight | Impa Kasanganay | def. | Devorious Tubbs | Decision (split) | 3 | 5:00 |
| Featherweight | Leivon Lewis | def. | Jonathan Jackson | Decision (unanimous) | 3 | 5:00 |

=== Legacy Fighting Alliance 72: Madrid vs. Harris ===
Legacy Fighting Alliance 72: Madrid vs. Harris
- Promotion: Legacy Fighting Alliance
- Date: July 26, 2019
- Venue: Comerica Theater
- City: Phoenix, Arizona, U.S.

Event chronology
| Legacy Fighting Alliance 71: Jackson vs. Souza | Legacy Fighting Alliance 72: Madrid vs. Harris | Legacy Fighting Alliance 73: Lingo vs. Hatley Jr. |

Legacy Fighting Alliance 72: Madrid vs. Harris was the seventy-third event of Legacy Fighting Alliance and took place on July 26, 2019. It aired on AXS TV.

Results

Main Card
| Weight class | | | | Method | Round | Time | Notes |
|---|---|---|---|---|---|---|---|
| Middleweight | Daniel Madrid | def. | Chris Harris | Submission (rear-naked choke) | 1 | 0:51 |
| Bantamweight | Anthony Birchak | def. | Raphael Montini | Submission (rear-naked choke) | 1 | 1:34 |
| Welterweight | Jacob McClintock | def. | Raymond Pina | Submission (armbar) | 2 | 2:13 |
| Catchweight (140 lbs) | Mario Israel | def. | Roman Salazar | Decision (split) | 3 | 5:00 |
| Featherweight | Paris Stanford | def. | Jake Heffernan | Submission (triangle choke) | 3 | 4:17 |
| Featherweight | Bruno Souza | def. | Mike Hamel | Disqualification (illegal strikes) | 3 | 3:12 |
| Lightweight | Alejandro Sanchez | def. | Vincent Arredondo | TKO (punches) | 3 | 2:00 |
Preliminary Card
| Welterweight | Joey Faletagoai | def. | Keali'i Kanekoa | Decision (unanimous) | 3 | 5:00 |
Amateur Bouts
| Welterweight | Ray Waters | def. | Steve Vasquez | KO (punches) | 1 | 2:04 |

=== Legacy Fighting Alliance 73: Lingo vs. Hatley Jr. ===
Legacy Fighting Alliance 73: Lingo vs. Hatley Jr.
- Promotion: Legacy Fighting Alliance
- Date: August 2, 2019
- Venue: The Bomb Factory
- City: Dallas, Texas, U.S.

Event chronology
| Legacy Fighting Alliance 72: Madrid vs. Harris | Legacy Fighting Alliance 73: Lingo vs. Hatley Jr. | Legacy Fighting Alliance 74: Vanderaa vs. Ferreira |

Legacy Fighting Alliance 73: Lingo vs. Hatley Jr. was the seventy-fourth event of Legacy Fighting Alliance and took place on August 2, 2019. It aired on AXS TV.

Results

Main Card
| Weight class | | | | Method | Round | Time | Notes |
|---|---|---|---|---|---|---|---|
| Featherweight | Austin Lingo | def. | Solo Hatley Jr. | KO (punches) | 1 | 0:25 |
| Women's Flyweight | Hailey Cowan | def. | Jessica Middleton | Decision (unanimous) | 3 | 5:00 |
| Flyweight | Victor Altamirano | def. | João Camilo | Decision (unanimous) | 3 | 5:00 |
| Bantamweight | Kyle Estrada | def. | Cody Freeman | Decision (majority) | 3 | 5:00 |
| Lightweight | Brant Moore Jr. | def. | Edmilson Freitas | Decision (unanimous) | 3 | 5:00 |
| Featherweight | Elijah Johns | def. | Aaron Webb | KO (knee) | 1 | 0:26 |
Preliminary Card
| Bantamweight | Fernie Garcia | def. | Marquis Smith | Decision (split) | 3 | 5:00 |
Amateur Bouts
| Lightweight | Malik Lewis | def. | Don Doyle | Decision (unanimous) | 3 | 3:00 |
| Lightweight | Shane Stipancic | def. | Joshua Truesdell | TKO (punches) | 2 | 1:22 |

=== Legacy Fighting Alliance 74: Vanderaa vs. Ferreira ===
Legacy Fighting Alliance 74: Vanderaa vs. Ferreira
- Promotion: Legacy Fighting Alliance
- Date: August 30, 2019
- Venue: Riverside Municipal Auditorium
- City: Riverside, California, U.S.

Event chronology
| Legacy Fighting Alliance 73: Lingo vs. Hatley Jr. | Legacy Fighting Alliance 74: Vanderaa vs. Ferreira | Legacy Fighting Alliance 75: Neal vs. Cruz |

Legacy Fighting Alliance 74: Vanderaa vs. Ferreira was the seventy-fifth event of Legacy Fighting Alliance and took place on August 30, 2019. It aired on AXS TV.

Results

Main Card
| Weight class | | | | Method | Round | Time | Notes |
|---|---|---|---|---|---|---|---|
| Heavyweight | Renan Ferreira | def. | Jared Vanderaa | Submission (triangle choke) | 2 | 2:37 |
| Bantamweight | Kevin Wirth | def. | Ryan Lilley | Decision (unanimous) | 3 | 5:00 |
| Middleweight | Lucas Rota | def. | Moses Murrietta | KO (punches) | 1 | 0:24 |
| Bantamweight | Liudvik Sholinian | def. | Vince Cachero | Decision (split) | 3 | 5:00 |
| Lightweight | Salvador Becerra | def. | Steve Kozola | Decision (unanimous) | 3 | 5:00 |
| Bantamweight | Leandro Gomes | def. | Anthony Jimenez | Submission (kneebar) | 1 | 3:05 |
| Lightweight | Spike Carlyle | def. | Matthew Colquhoun | KO (spinning backfist) | 1 | 3:58 |
Preliminary Card (Amateur Bouts)
| Lightweight | Jason Allen | def. | Kasen Matsch | Submission (rear-naked choke) | 1 | 1:29 |
| Welterweight | Jeffrey Craig | def. | Robert Pearlman | Decision (split) | 3 | 3:00 |

=== Legacy Fighting Alliance 75: Neal vs. Cruz ===
Legacy Fighting Alliance 75: Neal vs. Cruz
- Promotion: Legacy Fighting Alliance
- Date: September 6, 2019
- Venue: Maverik Center
- City: West Valley City, Utah, U.S.

Event chronology
| Legacy Fighting Alliance 74: Vanderaa vs. Ferreira | Legacy Fighting Alliance 75: Neal vs. Cruz | Legacy Fighting Alliance 76: Ogden vs. Browne |

Legacy Fighting Alliance 75: Neal vs. Cruz was the seventy-sixth event of Legacy Fighting Alliance and took place on September 6, 2019. It aired on AXS TV.

Results

Main Card
| Weight class | | | | Method | Round | Time | Notes |
|---|---|---|---|---|---|---|---|
| Featherweight | Andrew Cruz | def. | Jon Neal | Submission (rear-naked choke) | 2 | 4:28 |
| Featherweight | Mauro Chaulet | def. | Samson Phommabout | Decision (split) | 3 | 5:00 |
| Featherweight | Bobby King | def. | Westin Wilson | Decision (unanimous) | 3 | 5:00 |
| Catchweight (175 lbs) | Miles Hunsinger | def. | Nate Kearsley | Submission (rear-naked choke) | 2 | 4:46 |
| Middleweight | Ty Gwerder | def. | Mike Jones | KO (body kick) | 1 | 2:22 |
| Heavyweight | Eric Iman | def. | Tony Darling | KO (left hook) | 1 | 1:28 |
Preliminary Card
| Lightweight | Mitch Ramirez | def. | Michael Garcia | KO (head kick) | 1 | 0:40 |
| Welterweight | Dominico Salas | def. | Trever Bradshaw | TKO (punches) | 2 | 1:14 |
| Women's Atomweight | Stephanie Hernandez | def. | Chrisoula Koukouvetakis | Decision (split) | 3 | 5:00 |

=== Legacy Fighting Alliance 76: Ogden vs. Browne ===
Legacy Fighting Alliance 76: Ogden vs. Browne
- Promotion: Legacy Fighting Alliance
- Date: September 13, 2019
- Venue: Hartman Arena
- City: Park City, Kansas, U.S.

Event chronology
| Legacy Fighting Alliance 75: Neal vs. Cruz | Legacy Fighting Alliance 76: Ogden vs. Browne | Legacy Fighting Alliance 77: James vs. Martin |

Legacy Fighting Alliance 76: Ogden vs. Browne was the seventy-seventh event of Legacy Fighting Alliance and took place on September 13, 2019. It aired on AXS TV. The event also marked the end of LFA's deal with AXS TV as an acquisition of majority interest by Anthem Sports & Entertainment.

Results

Main Card
| Weight class | | | | Method | Round | Time | Notes |
|---|---|---|---|---|---|---|---|
| Lightweight | Nick Browne | def. | Trey Ogden | Submission (rear-naked choke) | 1 | 2:24 |
| Middleweight | Joaquin Buckley | def. | Chris Harris | TKO (punches) | 1 | 1:08 |
| Bantamweight | Jacob Thrall | def. | Eric Ellington | Submission (guillotine choke) | 1 | 4:52 |
| Featherweight | Chuka Willis | def. | Alex McGowan | Decision (unanimous) | 3 | 5:00 |
| Featherweight | Thai Clark | def. | Josh Augustine | Decision (unanimous) | 3 | 5:00 |
| Welterweight | Tyler Ingram | def. | Corey Davis | Submission (rear-naked choke) | 2 | 2:13 |
Preliminary Card
| Bantamweight | Steven Graham | def. | Johnny Marigo | Decision (majority) | 3 | 5:00 |
| Catchweight (130 lbs) | Jeff Molina | def. | Chancey Wilson | Submission (rear-naked choke) | 1 | 2:01 |
Amateur Bouts
| Featherweight | Bishop Price | def. | Lorenzo Carter | Decision (unanimous) | 3 | 3:00 |
| Lightweight | Devin Mayes | def. | Shawn Moffett | Submission (ankle lock) | 1 | 2:16 |

=== Legacy Fighting Alliance 77: James vs. Martin ===
Legacy Fighting Alliance 77: James vs. Martin
- Promotion: Legacy Fighting Alliance
- Date: September 27, 2019
- Venue: Mystic Lake Casino Hotel
- City: Prior Lake, Minnesota, U.S.

Event chronology
| Legacy Fighting Alliance 76: Ogden vs. Browne | Legacy Fighting Alliance 77: James vs. Martin | Legacy Fighting Alliance 78: Yañez vs. Estrada |

Legacy Fighting Alliance 77: James vs. Martin was the seventy-eighth event of Legacy Fighting Alliance and took place on September 27, 2019.

Results

Main Card
| Weight class | | | | Method | Round | Time | Notes |
|---|---|---|---|---|---|---|---|
| Heavyweight | Brett Martin | def. | Daniel James | Disqualification (illegal knees) | 5 | 1:12 | (Note: For the vacant LFA Heavyweight Championship.) |
| Heavyweight | Chad Johnson | def. | Calyn Hull | TKO (punches) | 1 | 2:14 |
| Lightweight | Bryce Logan | def. | Jonas Flok | Decision (unanimous) | 3 | 5:00 |
| Featherweight | Nate Togbah | def. | Matt Jones | TKO (knee and punches) | 3 | 0:41 |
| Lightweight | Mike Breeden | def. | Brandon Jenkins | KO (flying knee) | 3 | 1:51 |
| Welterweight | J.P. Saint Louis | def. | Scott Writz | Submission (guillotine choke) | 1 | 4:37 |
Preliminary Card
| Welterweight | Nelly Thompson | def. | Justin Trangsrud | TKO (punches) | 2 | 2:22 |
| Bantamweight | Sean Strube | def. | Zachary Buros-Nash | Submission (rear-naked choke) | 2 | 1:04 |
| Flyweight | Sean Stebbins | def. | Keegan Blanco | Submission (rear-naked choke) | 1 | 3:06 |
Amateur Bouts
| Lightweight | Noah Landrus | def. | Yamah Sadozai | Decision (split) | 3 | 3:00 |
| Featherweight | Davi Young | def. | Kyle Zimick | Decision (unanimous) | 3 | 3:00 |
| Heavyweight | Thomas Petersen | def. | Jimmy Barnes | Decision (unanimous) | 3 | 3:00 |
| Lightweight | Ryan Schafer | def. | Dick Legus | Decision (unanimous) | 3 | 3:00 |
| Women's Flyweight | Katie Koenig | def. | Shannon Clark | Decision (unanimous) | 3 | 3:00 |
| Bantamweight | Grant Bolduan | def. | David Hurrelbrink | Decision (unanimous) | 3 | 3:00 |
| Featherweight | Shane Abraham | def. | Nick Krohn | Decision (unanimous) | 3 | 3:00 |
| Bantamweight | Joshua Clark | def. | Edwin Jimenez | Decision (unanimous) | 3 | 3:00 |

=== Legacy Fighting Alliance 78: Yañez vs. Estrada ===
Legacy Fighting Alliance 78: Yañez vs. Estrada
- Promotion: Legacy Fighting Alliance
- Date: November 15, 2019
- Venue: Bell County Expo Center
- City: Belton, Texas, U.S.

Event chronology
| Legacy Fighting Alliance 77: James vs. Martin | Legacy Fighting Alliance 78: Yañez vs. Estrada | Legacy Fighting Alliance 79: Royval vs. Williams |

Legacy Fighting Alliance 78: Yañez vs. Estrada was the seventy-ninth event of Legacy Fighting Alliance and took place on November 15, 2019. It aired on UFC Fight Pass. The event also marked the beginning of LFA's deal with UFC Fight Pass.

Results

Main Card
| Weight class | | | | Method | Round | Time | Notes |
|---|---|---|---|---|---|---|---|
| Bantamweight | Adrian Yañez | def. | Kyle Estrada | Decision (split) | 3 | 5:00 |
| Bantamweight | Jose Johnson | def. | Rafael Costa | KO (elbow) | 1 | 1:59 |
| Lightweight | Brant Moore | def. | Nation Gibrick | Submission (rear-naked choke) | 1 | 3:23 |
| Bantamweight | JP Buys | def. | Cristian Rodriguez Jr. | TKO (punches) | 1 | 1:13 |
| Heavyweight | Vernon Lewis | def. | Yimaz Wildman | Decision (majority) | 3 | 5:00 |
| Women's Strawweight | Cheyanne Buys | def. | Rebecca Adney | Decision (unanimous) | 3 | 5:00 |
| Catchweight (150 lbs) | Elijah Johns | def. | Michael Murphy | Decision (unanimous) | 3 | 5:00 |
Preliminary Card
| Welterweight | Steven Jones | def. | Mario Nelson | TKO (punches) | 2 | 1:56 |
Amateur Bouts
| Lightweight | Michael Durant | def. | Artwaun Steele | Submission (rear-naked choke) | 3 | 1:16 |
| Bantamweight | Jose Holguin | def. | Marquis Jones | Submission (armbar) | 2 | 0:29 |

=== Legacy Fighting Alliance 79: Royval vs. Williams ===
Legacy Fighting Alliance 79: Royval vs. Williams
- Promotion: Legacy Fighting Alliance
- Date: November 22, 2019
- Venue: 1STBANK Center
- City: Broomfield, Colorado, U.S.

Event chronology
| Legacy Fighting Alliance 78: Yañez vs. Estrada | Legacy Fighting Alliance 79: Royval vs. Williams | Legacy Fighting Alliance 80: Garcia vs. Marsical |

Legacy Fighting Alliance 79: Royval vs. Williams was the eightieth event of Legacy Fighting Alliance and took place on November 22, 2019. It aired on UFC Fight Pass.

Results

Main Card
| Weight class | | | | Method | Round | Time | Notes |
|---|---|---|---|---|---|---|---|
| Flyweight | Brandon Royval | def. | Nate Williams | Submission (armbar) | 1 | 0:23 | (Note: For the vacant LFA Flyweight Championship.) |
| Bantamweight | Zviad Lazishvili | def. | Josh Huber | Decision (unanimous) | 3 | 5:00 |
| Catchweight (140 lbs) | Youssef Zalal | def. | Jaime Hernandez | KO (flying knee) | 1 | 2:15 |
| Flyweight | Carlos Motta | def. | George Martinez | TKO (body kick) | 1 | 0:36 |
| Lightweight | Eric Grant | def. | Jonathan Wyderko | Decision (unanimous) | 3 | 5:00 |
| Bantamweight | Justin Wetzell | def. | Michael Aquila | TKO (punches) | 1 | 0:27 |
Preliminary Card
| Featherweight | Michael Stack | def. | Brian Mitchell | Submission (rear-naked choke) | 1 | 3:09 |
| Featherweight | Edwin Chavez | def. | Michael Santos | Decision (unanimous) | 3 | 5:00 |
Amateur Bouts
| Featherweight | Jota Ninomiya | def. | Josh Taylor | Submission (rear-naked choke) | 1 | 2:24 |
| Flyweight | Jorge Kanakoqui | def. | Tyler Ashton | Submission (rear-naked choke) | 3 | 1:26 |
