= Aori Qileng =

Mongolian ethnic mixed martial artist

- Born: June 25, 1993 (age 33); Xilingol, Inner Mongolia, China
- Native name: 傲日其楞
- Other names: Mongolian Murderer
- Height: 5 ft 7 in (1.70 m)
- Weight: 135 lb (61 kg; 9 st 9 lb)
- Division: Featherweight (2015–2016); Bantamweight (2016–2020, 2022–present); Flyweight (2021)
- Reach: 69.0 in (175 cm)
- Style: Sanda
- Stance: Orthodox
- Fighting out of: Inner Mongolia, China
- Team: Xin-Du Martial Arts Club; Fight Ready (2022–present)
- Trainer: Zhao Xuejun
- Years active: 2015–present

Mixed martial arts record
- Total: 41
- Wins: 26
- By knockout: 9
- By submission: 1
- By decision: 16
- Losses: 14
- By knockout: 3
- By submission: 3
- By decision: 8
- No contests: 1

Other information
- Mixed martial arts record from Sherdog

Aori Qileng (Chinese: 傲日其楞; born June 25, 1993), sometimes written as Aoriqileng is a Chinese mixed martial artist who competed in the Bantamweight division of the Ultimate Fighting Championship.

== Background ==
Growing up in Xilingol League, Inner Mongolia, his family were herders and lived a nomadic lifestyle. In Mongolian, Aori qileng means "universe". As a child, Aori relied on the excellent physical fitness to embark on the road of sports. After training with the coach for a period of time, he was sent to Xi'an Sports Institute to practice Sanda with the famous coach Zhao Xuejun. Under the influence of his senior brother, Ao Riqi Leng began to switch to free-fighting mixed martial arts.

He would win various championships in Sanda, winning the championship 2012 Inner Mongolia National Games at 52 kg, the championship of 2013 Inner Mongolia Sanshou Tournament at 56 kg, the championship of 2014 Fight King Tournament at 60 kg, the championship of 2015 Fight King Tournament at 63 kg in Inner Mongolia Tongliao, and finally in December 2016, he won the gold belt in Sino-French King of Fighters Match 61 kg four-way tournament, winning two consecutive matches to take the gold belt.

== Mixed martial arts career ==
=== Early career ===
Aori Qileng compiled a 20–9 record mostly on the Chinese regional scene, most notably winning the WLF Bantamweight Championship and defending the title of China's top mixed martial arts promotion Wu Lin Feng.

=== Ultimate Fighting Championship ===
Aori faced Jeff Molina on April 24, 2021, at UFC 261. He lost the bout via unanimous decision. The bout earned Aori a Fight of the Night bonus award.

Aori faced Cody Durden on November 20, 2021, at UFC Fight Night 198. He lost the bout via unanimous decision.

Aori faced Cameron Else on April 23, 2022, at UFC Fight Night 205. He won the fight via technical knockout in the first round.

Aori faced Jay Perrin on August 20, 2022, at UFC 278. He won the fight by unanimous decision.

Aori faced Aiemann Zahabi on June 10, 2023, at UFC 289. He lost the bout in the first round via knockout in the first round.

Aori faced Johnny Muñoz Jr. on October 7, 2023, at UFC Fight Night 229. He won the fight via unanimous decision.

Aori faced Daniel Marcos at UFC Fight Night 236 on February 10, 2024. The bout resulted in a no contest as a result of repeated accidental low blows.

Aori faced Raul Rosas Jr. on September 14, 2024 at UFC 306. He lost the fight by unanimous decision.

Aori faced Cody Gibson on October 18, 2025, at UFC Fight Night 262. He won the fight by technical knockout 21 seconds into the first round. This fight earned him his first Performance of the Night award.

Aori faced Cody Haddon on May 30, 2026, at UFC Fight Night 277. He lost the fight by technical knockout via knees to the body and punches in the second round.

Aori faced Kai Asakura on August 29, 2026 at UFC Fight Night 286. He lost the fight by technical knockout in the second round.

On September 5, 2026, it was reported that Aori was removed from the UFC roster.

== Championships and accomplishments ==
- Ultimate Fighting Championship
  - Fight of the Night (One time) vs. Jeff Molina
  - Performance of the Night (One time) vs. Cody Gibson
- Wu Lin Feng
  - WLF Bantamweight Championship (One time)
    - One successful title defence

== Mixed martial arts record ==
Professional record breakdown
41 matches	26 wins	14 losses
By knockout	9	3
By submission	1	3
By decision	16	8
No contests	1	

Res.	Record	Opponent	Method	Event	Date	Round	Time	Location	Notes
Loss	26–14 (1)	Kai Asakura	TKO (head kick and punches)	UFC Fight Night: Nurmagomedov vs. Song	August 29, 2026	2	0:34	Shanghai, China	
Loss	26–13 (1)	Cody Haddon	TKO (knees to the body and punches)	UFC Fight Night: Song vs. Figueiredo	May 30, 2026	2	2:11	Macau SAR, China	
Win	26–12 (1)	Cody Gibson	TKO (punches)	UFC Fight Night: de Ridder vs. Allen	October 18, 2025	1	0:21	Vancouver, British Columbia, Canada	Performance of the Night.
Loss	25–12 (1)	Raul Rosas Jr.	Decision (unanimous)	UFC 306	September 14, 2024	3	5:00	Las Vegas, Nevada, United States	
NC	25–11 (1)	Daniel Marcos	NC (accidental groin kick)	UFC Fight Night: Hermansson vs. Pyfer	February 10, 2024	2	3:28	Las Vegas, Nevada, United States	Accidental groin strike rendered Qileng unable to continue.
Win	25–11	Johnny Muñoz Jr.	Decision (unanimous)	UFC Fight Night: Dawson vs. Green	October 7, 2023	3	5:00	Las Vegas, Nevada, United States	
Loss	24–11	Aiemann Zahabi	KO (punches)	UFC 289	June 10, 2023	1	1:04	Vancouver, British Columbia, Canada	
Win	24–10	Jay Perrin	Decision (unanimous)	UFC 278	August 20, 2022	3	5:00	Salt Lake City, Utah, United States	
Win	23–10	Cameron Else	TKO (punches)	UFC Fight Night: Lemos vs. Andrade	April 23, 2022	1	2:48	Las Vegas, Nevada, United States	Return to Bantamweight.
Loss	22–10	Cody Durden	Decision (unanimous)	UFC Fight Night: Vieira vs. Tate	November 20, 2021	3	5:00	Las Vegas, Nevada, United States	
Loss	22–9	Jeff Molina	Decision (unanimous)	UFC 261	April 24, 2021	3	5:00	Jacksonville, Florida, United States	Return to Flyweight. Fight of the Night.
Win	22–8	Khizri Abdulaev	KO (punches)	WLF W.A.R.S. 41	January 3, 2020	2	3:38	Zhengzhou, China	
Win	21–8	Amirlan Amirov	Decision (unanimous)	WLF W.A.R.S. 39	October 18, 2019	3	5:00	Zhengzhou, China	Defended the WLF Bantamweight Championship.
Win	20–8	Giorgi Borashvili	TKO (retirement)	WLF W.A.R.S. 35	June 14, 2019	1	5:00	Zhengzhou, China	
Win	19–8	Yong E	Submission (armbar)	WLF W.A.R.S. 31	January 3, 2019	1	3:34	Henan, China	Won the WLF Bantamweight Championship.
Win	18–8	Carlos Eduardo de Azevedo	Decision (unanimous)	WLF W.A.R.S. 30	December 14, 2018	3	5:00	Henan, China	
Win	17–8	Orazgeldi Atabayev	TKO (punches)	WLF W.A.R.S. 29	November 16, 2018	1	4:40	Zhengzhou, China	Catchweight (128 lb) bout.
Loss	16–8	Amirlan Amirov	Decision (unanimous)	WLF W.A.R.S. 27	September 14, 2018	3	5:00	Zhengzhou, China	
Loss	16–7	Shuo Wang	Decision (unanimous)	Chin Woo Men: 2017-2018 Season: Stage 10	June 10, 2018	3	5:00	Guangzhou, China	
Win	16–6	Sen Yang	Decision (unanimous)	Chin Woo Men: 2017-2018 Season: Stage 9	May 12, 2018	3	5:00	Guangzhou, China	
Loss	15–6	Jiaerken Ailimubai	Decision (unanimous)	Chin Woo Men: 2017-2018 Season: Stage 7	April 14, 2018	3	5:00	Guangzhou, China	
Win	15–5	Vladislav Doroshenko	Decision (unanimous)	WLF W.A.R.S. 22	March 17, 2018	3	5:00	Kaifeng, China	
Loss	14–5	Xiaolong Wu	Decision (split)	Chin Woo Men: 2017-2018 Season: Stage 6	March 11, 2018	3	5:00	Guangzhou, China	
Win	14–4	Maksadjon Yusupov	Decision (unanimous)	WLF W.A.R.S. 21	January 13, 2018	3	5:00	Zhengzhou, China	Catchweight (128 lb) bout.
Win	13–4	Ailiyaer Didaer	Decision (unanimous)	Chin Woo Men: 2017-2018 Season, Stage 1	December 9, 2017	3	5:00	Wuhan, China	
Win	12–4	Kana Hyatt	TKO (punches)	WLF W.A.R.S. 19	November 11, 2017	1	3:24	Zhengzhou, China	Catchweight (132 lb) bout.
Win	11–4	Huo You Ga Bu	Decision (split)	WLF W.A.R.S. 17	September 16, 2017	3	5:00	Zhengzhou, China	
Win	10–4	Nakouzi	TKO (punches)	Guan Sheng: International Wushu Culture Festival	August 10, 2017	1	2:29	Yuncheng, China	
Win	9–4	Vitalii	TKO (flying knee and punches)	Fight King: Gold Belt Contest	July 16, 2017	1	1:44	Xi'an, China	
Loss	8–4	Umidjon Musayev	Submission (rear-naked choke)	WLF W.A.R.S. 15	June 19, 2017	3	1:01	Zhengzhou, China	Catchweight (132 lb) bout.
Loss	8–3	Kai Kara-France	Decision (unanimous)	WLF W.A.R.S. 14	May 20, 2017	3	5:00	Zhengzhou, China	Catchweight (129 lb) bout.
Win	8–2	Kirill Tropinin	Decision (unanimous)	WLF W.A.R.S. 12	March 11, 2017	3	5:00	Ningxiang, China	
Win	7–2	Max Hunter Leali	Decision (unanimous)	Kung Fu World Cup 2017: Day 1	January 24, 2017	3	5:00	Ningxiang, China	
Win	6–2	Martial Seguy	Decision (unanimous)	100% Fight: Contenders 34	December 17, 2016	3	5:00	Aubervilliers, France	Bantamweight Tournament Finals.
Win	5–2	Willy Zancanaro	Decision (unanimous)	100% Fight: Contenders 34	December 17, 2016	2	5:00	Aubervilliers, France	Bantamweight Tournament Semifinals.
Win	4–2	Ahmad Davlatov	TKO (punches)	WLF E.P.I.C. 9	October 24, 2016	1	1:29	Zhengzhou, China	Flyweight bout.
Win	3–2	Rishat Kharisov	Decision (unanimous)	WLF E.P.I.C. 8	September 28, 2016	3	5:00	Zhengzhou, China	
Loss	2–2	Siwuhaer Husiman	Submission (rear-naked choke)	CKF 66	May 4, 2016	1	1:24	Qiannan, China	
Loss	2–1	Grigorii Popov	Submission (rear-naked choke)	WLF E.P.I.C. 2	March 12, 2016	2	4:35	Zhengzhou, China	Bantamweight bout.
Win	2–0	Minghui Bai	Decision (unanimous)	CKF 4	December 20, 2015	3	5:00	Beijing, China	Featherweight debut.
Win	1–0	Guoqing Zhong	Decision (unanimous)	CKF 3	November 6, 2015	3	5:00	Xi'an, China	Catchweight (160 lb) bout.

== See also ==
- List of male mixed martial artists
