= Art of War Fighting Championship =

Mixed martial arts promoter based in Beijing

- Company type: Private
- Industry: Mixed martial arts promotion
- Founded: 2005
- Founders: Andy Pi and Konrad Pi
- Defunct: Jan 18, 2016
- Headquarters: Beijing, China
- Parent: Adoria Entertainment Group
- Website: http://www.artofwarfc.com/

The Art of War Fighting Championship (英雄榜/Art of War/AOW) was a Chinese professional mixed martial arts promotion based in Beijing, China. The Chinese title "英雄榜" literally translated means "Gathering of Heroes." Art of War FC has no relation to the defunct American MMA promotion Art of War Undisputed Arena Fighting Championship. Art of War I was held at the Beijing Sport University on November 6, 2005. The inaugural event made it the first professional mixed martial arts contest in the People's Republic of China. To date, AOW has held 15 events in mainland China. Its largest event was Art of War 12 - Invincible, held at the National Olympic Sports Center Auditorium in Beijing on May 23, 2009, to an audience of around 6,000 fans. The event attracted many international guests, including former UFC Heavyweight Champion Tim Sylvia, renowned ring announcer Michael Buffer, and experienced referee "Big" John McCarthy.

The Art of War Fighting Championship has featured some of China's top mixed martial arts athletes, including IKF World Champion and 2002 King of Sanda champion, Bao Li Gao; 1996 Chinese Olympian and China national judo champion, Ao Te Gen Ba Tar; and 2004 Chinese Olympian and China national Greco-Roman wrestling champion, Sai Yin Ji Ya. In addition, Art of War FC has featured some of the world's top fighters including WKN European Muay Thai champion Filippo Cinti of Italy, DEEP veteran Jeong Ho Lee of Korea, and Japanese Karate and ju-jutsu expert, Setsuma Takeda.

Art of War is the first mixed martial arts organization to be broadcast by CCTV-5, China's largest sports broadcasting platform with over 1 billion audience coverage in China and internationally. Art of War IV, broadcast on December 29, 2006, set a record as the single largest mixed martial arts tournament broadcast in the world.

In March 2008, Art of War Fighting Championship signed a China nationwide broadcasting agreement which will bring the tournament into the homes of over 200 million viewers around the country on a weekly basis, including regions of Hong Kong, Macau, Australia, and New Zealand.

== Origins ==
The Art of War Fighting Championship was founded by Brazilian Jiu-jitsu instructor Andy Pi and his younger brother Konrad Pi, both Chinese Americans living in California at the time they conceived of the idea of creating an MMA promotion in China. After Andy Pi won a tough match against Xu Xiaodong with an armbar submission, he wanted to find a way to promote jiu-jitsu in China. Konrad Pi, an investment manager and private helicopter pilot living in San Diego thought it was a good idea, but the idea would be hard to execute due to the restrictions formed by the Chinese government as well as the difficulty of raising money for a big promotion.

Fortunately, their father Frank Pi is a business executive with ties to China. They successfully made contact with the Chinese government and obtained the proper permits for hosting a sporting event. The Pi family eventually found a few potential sponsors, including football star Rashaan Salaam.

When setting up the promotion, Andy sought out grapplers to compete in it. He met Zhao Xuejun, a renowned Sanda coach who convinced Pi that he didn't need to seek out pure grapplers and that Sanda fighters were just as capable of competing in MMA. Some of the earliest fighters who fought in the promotion would be Sanda fighters from Zhao's school which had now changed its focus to MMA.

On November 6, 2005, The Art of War Fighting Championship conducted its first event.

== Rules ==
The Art of War Fighting Championship tournaments are conducted according to the Art of War Unified Rules System, which allows for a variety of striking and submission techniques including soccer kicks, stomps, elbows, and knees to the head of a grounded opponent.

=== Rounds ===
All non-title fights shall consist of one ten-minute round and one five-minute round, with two minutes of rest in between. Title fights will have three rounds; one ten-minute round and two five-minute rounds (With a two-minute break between the first and second round and a one-minute break between the second and third round).

=== Weight divisions ===
The Art of War Fighting Championship currently uses eight weight classes:

- Lightweight: Below 60 kg (132.3 lb; 9.4 st)
- Super Lightweight: 60 kg (132.3 lb; 9.4 st) to 66 kg (145.5 lb; 10.4 st)
- Welterweight: 66 kg (145.5 lb; 10.4 st) to 72 kg (158.7 lb; 11.3 st)
- Super Welterweight: 72 kg (158.7 lb; 11.3 st) to 78 kg (172.0 lb; 12.3 st)
- Middleweight: 78 kg (172.0 lb; 12.3 st) to 84 kg (185.2 lb; 13.2 st)
- Super Middleweight: 84 kg (185.2 lb; 13.2 st) to 90 kg (198.4 lb; 14.2 st)
- Heavyweight: 90 kg (198.4 lb; 14.2 st) to 100 kg (220.5 lb; 15.7 st)
- Super Heavyweight: Over 100 kg (220.5 lb; 15.7 st)

=== Match outcome ===
The winner of the bout shall be determined by one of the following methods:

- KO (Knockout) – Fighter is knocked out.
- TKO (Technical Knockout) – When a fighter has gained a remarkably superior advantage over his opponent and the referee determines that the inferior fighter is in danger if the fight continues.
- Submission – When the contestant surrenders, submission and/or forfeiture is expressed either verbally or by tapping more than three (3) consecutive times on the mat or the opponent's body using the hand or the foot.
- Doctor Stoppage – When a fighter is injured by an opponent's legal attack and if a ringside doctor determines that the injured fighter is incapable of continuing the fight, the injured fighter loses the match.
- Renunciation – The fighter's corner men may surrender the fight by "throwing in the towel." In case the referee fails to see it, the Art of War organizing committee can stop the fight.
- Disqualification – If a fighter is disqualified because of an illegal action as per Article 4, his opponent will be deemed the winner of the bout.

No Contest - The match shall be ruled a "No Contest" when:

- An illegal action disqualifies both fighters.
- The judges, doctors, or the Art of War organizing committee end the fight because of an accident during Round 1.
- An accident causes either or both fighters to be unable to continue.

Technical Draw - The match shall be ruled a "Technical Draw" when:

- If at the end of the bout, a winner has not been determined according to the criteria defined in Articles 3.1 – 3.6.
- The judges, doctors, or the Art of War organizing committee end the fight because of an accident during Round 2.

NOTE: Based on the previous articles, there are no decision victories made by judges, fights that go the distance are ruled as technical draws.

=== Illegal actions ===
The AOW Fighting Championship has deemed these actions to be illegal:

- Butting with the head.
- Eye attacks of any kind.
- Biting.
- Hair-pulling.
- Fish-hooking.
- Attacking the groin.
- Putting a finger into any orifice or into any cut or laceration on your opponent.
- Striking using the point of the elbow.
- Throat strikes of any kind, including without limitation, grabbing, pushing or squeezing the trachea with the hands and/or fingers.
- Clawing, pinching or twisting the flesh and ears.
- Spiking an opponent to the canvas on his head or neck.
- Attacking the back of the head, the spine and the medulla.
- Grabbing, twisting or squeezing the fingers and toes (small joint manipulations).
- Holding onto the shorts or gloves of an opponent.
- Timidity, including without limitation, avoiding contact with an opponent, intentionally or repeatedly dropping the mouthpiece, escaping to the outside of the contest area, or faking an injury.
- Grabbing onto and refusing to release the ring ropes and/or intentionally hanging the limbs of the body (hands, arms, legs or feet) over the ring ropes.
- Grabbing, holding or otherwise impeding an opponent's movements with the sole intention of obtaining a referee restart.
- Throwing the opponent outside of the ring or contest area.
- Spitting at an opponent.
- Engaging in unsportsmanlike conduct.
- Using abusive language in the contest area.
- Attacking an opponent during the break.
- Attacking an opponent who is under the care of the referee or doctor.
- Attacking an opponent after the bell has sounded the end of the round.
- Flagrantly disregarding the instructions of the referee.
- Interference by a fighter's corner men

== Art of War Fighting Championship events ==
This is a list of events held and scheduled by Art of War Fighting Championship.

No.	Event	Date	Venue	Location
1	Art of War I	November 6, 2005	Beijing Sports University	Beijing, China
2	Art of War II	December 10, 2005	Araneta Coliseum	Manila, Philippines
3	Art of War III	March 25, 2006	Communications University Auditorium	Xi'an, China
4	Art of War IV	December 22, 2006	The National Olympic Sports Center	Beijing, China
5	Art of War V	March 31, 2007	Xing Guang Studio	Beijing, China
6	Art of War 6	May 26, 2007	Xing Guang Studio	Beijing, China
7	Art of War 7	July 28, 2007	Xing Guang Studio	Beijing, China
8	Art of War 8: Worlds Collide	September 22, 2007	Xing Guang Studio	Beijing, China
9	Art of War 9: Fists of Fury	November 24, 2007	Xing Guang Studio	Beijing, China
10	Art of War 10: Final Conflict	December 23, 2007	The National Olympic Sports Center	Beijing, China
11	Art of War 11: The Real Deal	March 28, 2009	Chaoyang Gymnasium	Beijing, China
12	Art of War 12: Invincible	April 12, 2009	The National Olympic Sports Center	Beijing, China
13	Art of War 13: Rising Force	July 18, 2009	The National Olympic Sports Center	Beijing, China
14	Art of War 14: Ground Zero	September 26, 2009	The Venetian Macao	Macau
15	Art of War 15: Showdown	November 28, 2009	The National Olympic Sports Center	Beijing, China
16	Art of War 16: Return of the King	January 16, 2016	The National Olympic Sports Center	Beijing, China
17	Art of War 17	April 30, 2016	The National Olympic Sports Center	Beijing, China
18	Art of War 18	July 30, 2016	The National Olympic Sports Center	Beijing, China

== Notable Art of War FC fighters ==
- (Mongolia) Jadamba Narantungalag
- (Brazil) Antonio Braga Neto
- (Netherlands) Rodney Glunder
- (Brazil) Rolles Gracie
- (Australia) Peter Graham
- (Denmark) Ole Laursen
- (Japan) Daijiro Matsui
- (Norway) Simeon Thoresen
- (Japan) Ryuki Ueyama
- (China) Zhang Tie Quan
- (Japan) Ryuki Ueyama
