= Zhao Xuejun =

Chinese Sanda Coach

- Born: 赵学军; October 1966 (age 58); Inner Mongolia, China
- Style: Sanda
- Trainer: Zhu Ruiqi

Other information
- Occupation: Deputy director of wushu department at xi'an physical education university
- University: Beijing Sport University

Zhao Xuejun (Chinese: 赵学军; pinyin: Zhàoxuéjūn; born October 1966) is a Chinese martial artist, Sanda coach and former Sanda practitioner. He has played a key role in the development of Sanda and later Mixed martial arts (MMA) in China. Because of this he is considered one of the Godfathers of MMA in China alongside Andy Pi.

== Early life and education ==
Zhao was born in October 1966 in the Inner Mongolia province of China.

In 1984, he attended Beijing Sport University. He originally wanted to be a volleyball player but lost interest in it as he felt it wasn't competitive enough. In 1985, he joined the university's sanda team under tutelage of Zhu Ruiqi. During his three years in the team, his best result was third nationally in the 65 kg category. In 1988, Zhao graduated and his coach Zhu Ruiqi invited him to remain at the school but Zhao chose to return to his hometown where he served as a Physical Education teacher.

== Coaching career ==
Zhao noted there was no Sanda team in Inner Mongolia and sought out people to help him establish it. From 1989 to 1994, he was transferred to the post of assistant coach of Inner Mongolia's boxing team where he noted it was a good learning experience as foreign experts were brought in. In 1994, Zhao achieved his goal of establishing the first Inner Mongolia Sanda Team. He visited various schools to recruit members although there was initial difficulty as many who joined quit early due to strenuous training requirements needed for the sport. The team would go on to achieve varying levels of success at national level. At the 2001 National Games of China, the Inner Mongolia sports committee assigned the Sanda team the task of obtaining a gold medal. Unfortunately while the team performed strongly, it ultimately fell short of achieving its goal. Afterwards, Zhao was transferred to Xi'an Physical Education University to head its Sanda team. His students in the provincial team were not satisfied with the new replacement so they followed Zhao to X'ian.

While at Xi'an, the new team didn't have much resources and the training conditions were difficult. Nonetheless, the team achieved strong results in tournaments such as WKA - King of Sanda. Seeing the success, the school provided more resources for the team including a new training hall. In 2002, Zhao was awarded the national sports medal of honor. At the 2005 National Games of China, his students Gele Qing and Qin Lizi won a gold and silver medal respectively in Sanda.

In 2005, Zhao met Andy Pi who was then looking for fighters in China to participate in his MMA promotion, Art of War Fighting Championship. Zhao convinced Pi that looking for pure grapplers was misguided and that Sanda fighters he recommended were also suitable for MMA .

Since then Zhao has changed his focus to MMA and has spent more time promoting it in China. Zhao believes that MMA is the closest sport to actual combat. When it comes to styles, Zhao has stated fighters from China should use their inherent advantages which it is in stand-up fighting rather than trying to match others in grappling which China has less experience in.

Zhao is considered an important figure in both Sanda and Chinese MMA. In Sanda he has trained many strong players who have gone on to win championships. In MMA, his team became the first to offer training in the field and some of the earliest Chinese MMA fighters were produced under his guidance. Most notable of them is Zhang Tiequan who was the first UFC fighter from China also the first to obtain a win with the promotion at UFC 127. It is said that without Zhao, China's MMA scene development would have been delayed by at least five years.

== Students ==
=== Sanda ===
- An Hu - One of the first fighters from China to participate in K-1 and the first to win via KO/TKO
- Geriletu- 65 kg champion at 2001 World Wushu Championships
- Nashungerile - National champion
- Bao Ligao - IKF and WKA champion
- Aotegen Bateer - National champion
- Gele Qing - National champion
- Qin Lizi - Multiple-time world champion
- Cai Liang Chan - 70 kg champion at 2008 Beijing Wushu Tournament

=== MMA ===
- Zhang Tiequan - The first fighter from China to participate in the UFC and the first to win a sanctioned bout
- Yan Xiaonan - The first female fighter from China to participate in the UFC. Peak ranking of No. 3 in the Women's Strawweight division
- Aori Qileng - UFC fighter
- Wu Yanan - UFC fighter
- Jumabek Tursyn - UFC fighter

== Personal ==
Zhao is currently deputy director of Wushu department as well as Head Coach of the Sanda team at Xi'an Physical Education University. He is a member of the Chinese Communist Party.
