= Natan Levy =

Israeli mixed martial artist

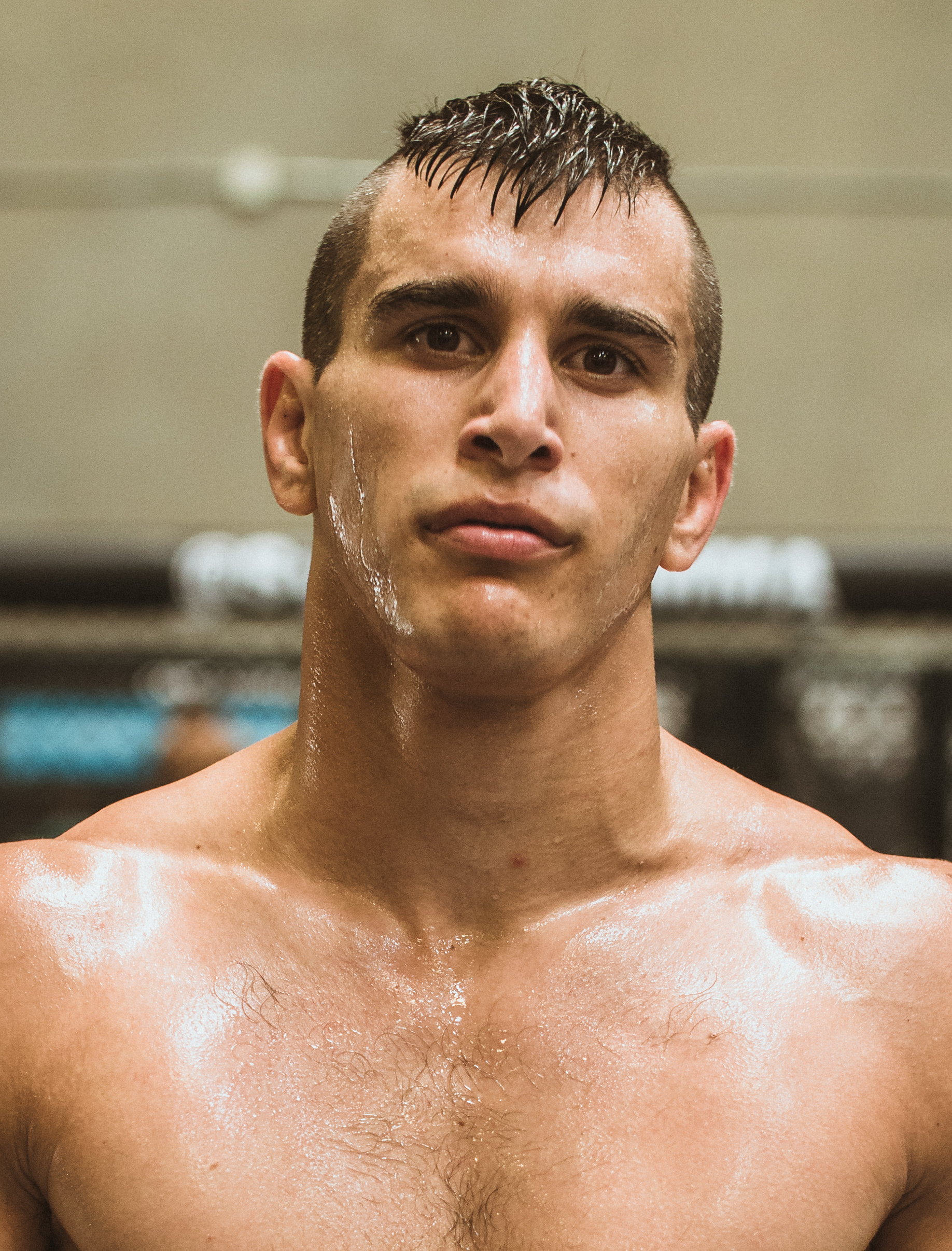
- Levy in 2018
- Born: September 30, 1991 (age 35); Paris, France
- Native name: נתן לוי
- Nickname: Lethal
- Nationality: Israeli
- Height: 5 ft 9 in (1.75 m)
- Weight: 157 lb (71 kg; 11 st 3 lb)
- Division: Featherweight (2018–2020); Lightweight (2021–present)
- Reach: 72 in (183 cm)
- Stance: Southpaw
- Fighting out of: Las Vegas, Nevada, U.S.
- Team: Syndicate MMA; Xtreme Couture
- Rank: 3rd dan black belt in Uechi-Ryū Karate; Black belt in Kyokushin Karate; Black belt in Kung Fu; Purple belt in Brazilian Jiu-Jitsu
- Years active: 2018–present

Mixed martial arts record
- Total: 11
- Wins: 9
- By knockout: 1
- By submission: 3
- By decision: 5
- Losses: 2
- By submission: 1
- By decision: 1

Amateur record
- Total: 4
- Wins: 4
- By submission: 3
- By decision: 1

Other information
- Spouse: Dana Yudelevich Levy
- Website: levymma.com
- Mixed martial arts record from Sherdog
- Last updated on: 3 December 2022

Natan Levy (Hebrew: נתן לוי; born September 30, 1991) is a French-born Israeli professional mixed martial artist who competed in the lightweight division in the Ultimate Fighting Championship (UFC). He is a two-time winner of the Ultimate Self-Defense Championship reality competition series, which is featured on the USDC by Rokas Leo YouTube channel.

== Early life ==
Levy was born on 30 September 1991 in Paris, France to a traditional Jewish family. He moved to Israel as a toddler and grew up in Herzliya. Levy began practicing martial arts as a teenager, training three hours a day by 15 years old, and earned his black belt in Kung Fu at the age of 17. One year later, he traveled to Okinawa, Japan to receive his black belt in Karate.

Prior to his professional MMA career, Levy worked as a martial arts instructor and ran a Karate dojo in Tel Aviv, Israel. After being awarded his 3rd degree black belt in Uechi-Ryū Karate, he moved to Las Vegas, Nevada, in the United States at the age of 22 in order to train in mixed martial arts and pursue a professional career. Over the first few years, he was forced to travel between training in Las Vegas and work in Israel to make money.

== Mixed martial arts career ==
=== Early career ===
At the age of 24, Levy made his mixed martial arts debut as an amateur in a fight against Isaac Caranza, on 25 June 2016, for the Tuff-N-Uff promotion in Las Vegas. He won via guillotine choke submission in the first minute of the first round. One month later, he defeated Josh Brady in the first round via rear naked choke submission after 50 seconds.

He subsequently beat Daniel Hudson via unanimous decision on 3 December, and Geoffrey Mellor via guillotine choke submission on 17 June 2017, bringing his mixed martial arts amateur record to 4–0.

=== Legacy Fighting Alliance ===
Levy made his professional debut in the Legacy Fighting Alliance in 2018 and ran off five consecutive wins. For his first fight in the American promotion company, he defeated Marcus Sims at LFA 36, on 23 March 2018, via armbar submission in the first round. His next bout in the LFA was against Cameron Underhill at LFA 45. Levy beat Underhill via guillotine choke submission in only 29 seconds of the first round. He then won via unanimous decision against Henry Barahona at LFA 58 on 25 January 2019, and Nicholas Badis at LFA 69 on 7 June. One year later, in August 2020, he defeated Ben Lugo at LFA 88 via majority decision for his last fight in the LFA.

After his win over Lugo, Levy earned a spot on Dana White's Contender Series 35 where he took on Shaheen Santana in a 160-pound catchweight bout. He beat Santana via arm triangle choke submission in the third round.

=== Ultimate Fighting Championship ===
Following his victory over Santana, Levy signed a contract with the Ultimate Fighting Championship. Initially fighting in the featherweight division, he moved up a weight class and began his UFC journey in the lightweight division. He made his debut for the organization in a fight against Rafa García at UFC Fight Night 198 on 20 November 2021 but lost the bout via unanimous decision.

After his loss to García, Levy rebounded with a win over Mike Breeden at UFC Vegas 53 via unanimous decision on 30 April 2022. He then faced Genaro Valdéz on 3 December 2022, at UFC on ESPN 42 and defeated him by unanimous decision after three rounds.

He was scheduled to face Pete Rodriguez on 29 April 2023 at UFC Vegas 72, and then on 13 May at UFC on ABC 4 but his opponent withdrew twice.

Levy was scheduled to face Alex Reyes on September 16, 2023, at UFC Fight Night 227. However, he withdrew from the fight after failing to pass pre-fight medical tests, and he was replaced by Charlie Campbell.

Levy faced Mike Davis on March 16, 2024, at UFC Fight Night 239. At the weigh-in, Levy weighed 156.5 pounds, half a pound over the lightweight non-title fight limit. The bout proceeded at catchweight and Levy was fined 20% of his purse which went to his opponent Davis. Levy lost the bout as a result of an arm-triangle submission in the second round.

On February 28, 2025, it was reported that Levy was removed from the UFC roster.

== Ultimate Self-Defense Championship ==
Natan Levy won the Ultimate Self-Defense Championship Season 2 on October 13, 2024, securing the Ultimate Self-Defense belt. He competed amongst six participants, but his toughest challenge came from Craig Hunter (a truck driver with minimal martial arts experience), who ultimately claimed second place. He returned to successfully defend his title in Season 3, beating the martial arts YouTuber and sumotori Sensei Seth to claim first place on 21 December 2025.

== Personal life ==
In addition to his native French and Hebrew, he is fluent in English.

He is good friends with fellow professional mixed martial artists Sean Strickland and Chris Curtis.

In late January 2025, after fellow UFC fighter Bryce Mitchell praised Adolf Hitler and made antisemitic comments on his podcast, Levy offered to educate Mitchell firsthand about Jewish culture and history.

== Mixed martial arts record ==
Professional record breakdown
11 matches	9 wins	2 losses
By knockout	1	0
By submission	3	1
By decision	5	1

Res.	Record	Opponent	Method	Event	Date	Round	Time	Location	Notes
Win	9–2	Zhang Kui	TKO (punches)	World X-Impact Federation: APEC 2025 Korea Summit Commemorative World MMA Competition	October 30, 2025	1	2:30	Seoul, South Korea	
Loss	8–2	Mike Davis	Submission (arm-triangle choke)	UFC Fight Night: Tuivasa vs. Tybura	March 16, 2024	2	1:43	Las Vegas, Nevada, United States	Catchweight (156.5 lb) bout; Levy missed weight.
Win	8–1	Genaro Valdéz	Decision (unanimous)	UFC on ESPN: Thompson vs. Holland	December 3, 2022	3	5:00	Orlando, Florida, United States	
Win	7–1	Mike Breeden	Decision (unanimous)	UFC on ESPN: Font vs. Vera	April 30, 2022	3	5:00	Las Vegas, Nevada, United States	
Loss	6–1	Rafa García	Decision (unanimous)	UFC Fight Night: Vieira vs. Tate	November 20, 2021	3	5:00	Las Vegas, Nevada, United States	Lightweight debut.
Win	6–0	Shaheen Santana	Submission (arm-triangle choke)	Dana White's Contender Series 35	November 10, 2020	3	0:55	Las Vegas, Nevada, United States	Catchweight (160 lb) bout.
Win	5–0	Ben Lugo	Decision (majority)	LFA 88	August 21, 2020	3	5:00	Sioux Falls, South Dakota, United States	
Win	4–0	Nicholas Badis	Decision (unanimous)	LFA 69	June 7, 2019	3	5:00	Cabazon, California, United States	
Win	3–0	Henry Barahona	Decision (unanimous)	LFA 58	January 25, 2019	3	5:00	Albuquerque, New Mexico, United States	
Win	2–0	Cameron Underhill	Submission (guillotine choke)	LFA 45	July 20, 2018	1	0:29	Cabazon, California, United States	
Win	1–0	Marcus Sims	Submission (armbar)	LFA 36	March 23, 2018	1	1:25	Cabazon, California, United States	Featherweight debut.

Amateur record breakdown		
4 matches	4 wins	0 losses
By submission	3	0
By decision	1	0

Res.	Record	Opponent	Method	Event	Date	Round	Time	Location	Notes
Win	4–0	Geoffrey Mellor	Submission (guillotine choke)	Tuff-N-Uff - Pack The Mack	June 17, 2017	3	0:41	Las Vegas, Nevada, United States	
Win	3–0	Daniel Hudson	Decision (unanimous)	Heartland FC: Genesis	December 3, 2016	3	3:00	Marion, Illinois, United States	
Win	2–0	Josh Brady	Submission (rear-naked choke)	Real MMA 11	July 29, 2016	1	0:50	Las Vegas, Nevada, United States	
Win	1–0	Isaac Caranza	Submission (guillotine choke)	Tuff-N-Uff - Pack The Mack	June 25, 2016	1	0:56	Las Vegas, Nevada, United States	

== Kickboxing record ==
Muay Thai record
0 Wins, 1 Losses, 0 Draw
Date	Result	Opponent	Event	Location	Method	Round	Time
2026-07-27	Loss	(United States) Lando Vannata	Gordon Fight Nights 1	Tel Aviv, Israel	Decision (split)	3	3:00
Legend: Win Loss Draw/No contest Notes
