= Steve Kozola =

American mixed martial arts fighter

- Born: December 17, 1989 (age 36); Naperville, Illinois, United States
- Other names: Thunderbeast
- Nationality: American
- Height: 5 ft 11 in (1.80 m)
- Weight: 155 lb (70 kg; 11.1 st)
- Division: Lightweight
- Reach: 72.5 in (184 cm)
- Fighting out of: San Diego, California, United States
- Team: Team Quest
- Rank: Black belt in Tae Kwon Do Black belt in Brazilian Jiu-Jitsu
- Years active: 2013–2020

Mixed martial arts record
- Total: 13
- Wins: 9
- By knockout: 8
- By submission: 1
- Losses: 4
- By knockout: 1
- By submission: 1
- By decision: 2

Other information
- Mixed martial arts record from Sherdog

Steven Kozola (born December 17, 1989) is an American mixed martial artist who most recently competed in Bellator's Lightweight division. A professional competitor since 2013, he has also competed for the World Series of Fighting.

== Mixed martial arts career ==
=== Early career ===
Kozola started his professional career in July 2013. He went undefeated in his first four bouts, stopping all of his opponents, before signing with Bellator MMA. He competed for a variety of promotions during this time, including Gladiator Challenge and Xplode Fight Series and World Series of fighting.

=== Bellator MMA ===
In his promotional debut for Bellator, Kozola was paired with Jonathan Rivera at Bellator 132 on January 16, 2015. Kozola won the fight via knockout in the second round.

In his second fight for the promotion, Kozola faced Ian Butler at Bellator 137 on May 15, 2015. Kozola once again won via knockout, this time in the first round, improving his undefeated record to 6–0.

After a successful debut in the World Series of Fighting, Kozola returned to Bellator against Jake Roberts at Bellator 175 on March 31, 2017. He won the fight via TKO, just 28 seconds into the first round.

Kozola faced Carrington Banks at Bellator 184 on October 6, 2017. He lost the fight via unanimous decision.

Kozola faced Jake Smith at Bellator 193 on January 26, 2018. He lost the fight via knockout early in the first round due to two right hands from Smith, followed by ground-and-pound that secured the stoppage. Kozola was subsequently released from the promotion.

Despite his release from Bellator, Kozola returned to the promotion and faced Ryan Walker at Bellator 202 on July 13, 2018. He won the fight via TKO in the first round.

== Mixed martial arts record ==
Professional record breakdown
13 matches	9 wins	4 losses
By knockout	8	1
By submission	1	1
By decision	0	2

Res.	Record	Opponent	Method	Event	Date	Round	Time	Location	Notes
Loss	9–4	Salvador Becerra	Decision (unanimous)	LFA 74	August 30, 2019	3	5:00	Riverside, California, United States	
Loss	9–3	Arthur Estrázulas	Submission (rear-naked choke)	LFA 69	June 7, 2019	1	2:32	Cabazon, California, United States	
Win	9–2	Ryan Walker	TKO (punches)	Bellator 202	July 13, 2018	1	1:45	Thackerville, Oklahoma, United States	
Loss	8–2	Jake Smith	KO (punches)	Bellator 193	January 26, 2018	1	0:57	Temecula, California, United States	
Loss	8–1	Carrington Banks	Decision (unanimous)	Bellator 184	October 6, 2017	3	5:00	Thackerville, Oklahoma, United States	
Win	8–0	Jake Roberts	TKO (punches)	Bellator 175	March 31, 2017	1	0:28	Rosemont, Illinois, United States	
Win	7–0	Matt Church	TKO (punches)	WSOF 30	April 2, 2016	1	1:57	Las Vegas, Nevada, United States	160 lb Catchweight bout.
Win	6–0	Ian Butler	KO (punches)	Bellator 137	May 15, 2015	1	2:22	Temecula, California, United States	
Win	5–0	Jonathan Rivera	KO (punches)	Bellator 132	January 16, 2015	2	1:25	Temecula, California, United States	
Win	4–0	Danny Morales Jr.	KO (strikes)	American Predator Fighting Championships 17	October 11, 2014	1	1:56	Hoffman Estates, Illinois, United States	Return to Lightweight.
Win	3–0	Eddy Gonzalez	TKO (punches)	Gladiator Challenge: Backlash	May 31, 2014	1	0:50	El Cajon, California, United States	Welterweight bout.
Win	2–0	Tommy Gavin	TKO (punches)	BAMMA USA: Badbeat 12	March 28, 2014	2	0:44	Commerce, California, United States	Featherweight debut.
Win	1–0	Ramon Hernandez	Submission (guillotine choke)	Xplode Fight Series: Aftermath	July 20, 2013	2	1:29	Valley Center, California, United States	

== See also ==
- List of current Bellator fighters
