= Jeff Molina =

American mixed martial arts fighter

- Born: Jeffrey Molina; July 17, 1997 (age 29); Lakewood, New Jersey, United States
- Other names: El Jefe
- Height: 5 ft 6 in (1.68 m)
- Weight: 125 lb (57 kg; 8 st 13 lb)
- Division: Bantamweight; Flyweight
- Reach: 69 in (175 cm)
- Fighting out of: Olathe, Kansas
- Team: Glory MMA and Fitness
- Years active: 2017–present

Mixed martial arts record
- Total: 13
- Wins: 11
- By knockout: 4
- By submission: 4
- By decision: 3
- Losses: 2
- By submission: 1
- By decision: 1

Other information
- Mixed martial arts record from Sherdog

Jeffrey Molina (born July 17, 1997) is an American mixed martial artist who formerly competed in the Flyweight division of the Ultimate Fighting Championship (UFC).

== Background ==
Molina was born in Lakewood, New Jersey. He attended Olathe South High School, where he participated in wrestling. He started training MMA at age 14, coached by Jason High and LC Davis. In 2017, he began training with James Krause at Glory MMA.

== Mixed martial arts career ==
=== Early career ===
Molina began his professional after a successful 9–0 amateur career. His professional debut took place on Jun 2, 2017 at VFC: Fight Night Harrah's 5, where he lost the bout to Steven Merrill via rear-naked choke in the first round. He rebounded at VFC 58, where he submitted Delfino Benitez via rear-naked choke in the first round. Molina would go on to lose his next bout against Nate Smith via close split decision at Victory FC: Fight Night Coco Key. Afterwards, Molina would go on to win his next 4 bouts via stoppages, before appearing at LFA 76, submitting Chauncey Wilson via rear-naked choke in round one. Molina would go on to submit Kenny Porter via arm-triangle choke at FAC 2.

Molina was invited to Dana White's Contender Series 30 on August 25, 2020, where he faced Jacob Silva, winning the bout via unanimous decision and earning a UFC contract.

=== Ultimate Fighting Championship ===
Molina was scheduled to face Zarrukh Adashev on November 14, 2020, at UFC Fight Night: Felder vs. dos Anjos, before the bout was rescheduled for UFC Fight Night 185. However, Molina withdrew from the event at the end of December 2020.

Molina made his UFC debut against Aori Qileng on April 24, 2021 at UFC 261. He won the bout via unanimous decision. The bout earned him a Fight of the Night bonus award. Molina's 220 strikes attempted in the third round is a UFC record.

In his sophomore performance, Molina faced Daniel da Silva on October 23, 2021, at UFC Fight Night: Costa vs. Vettori. He won the bout via TKO stoppage early in the second round.

Molina faced Zhalgas Zhumagulov on June 4, 2022, at UFC Fight Night: Volkov vs. Rozenstruik. He won the bout via controversial split decision. 12 out of 13 media scores gave it to Zhumagulov.

Molina was set to face Jimmy Flick on January 14, 2023, at UFC Fight Night 217. However, Molina withdrew from the event for undisclosed reasons and was replaced by Charles Johnson.

Molina is suspended by the NYAC and NSAC effective as of November 5, 2022, linking to a result of suspicious betting activity ahead of the November 5 UFC fight between Darrick Minner and Shayilan Nuerdanbieke, and Molina is temporary barred from the UFC until the matter is resolved.

In January 2023, it was reported that Molina was removed from the UFC's roster.

== Personal life ==
Following the leak of a private sex tape, Molina came out as bisexual in March 2023, which made him the first openly LGBT+ male UFC fighter.

=== Support for LGBTQ rights ===
Molina wore UFC Pride Month shorts during his fight with Zhalgas Zhumagulov in order to benefit the LGBTQ Center of Southern Nevada, which is the beneficiary of profits from sales of the UFC Pride Month T-shirts. He faced fierce backlash from some MMA fans. Molina expressed surprise to see such a reaction in 2022, and frustration at the perceived bigotry of those attacking him on social media.

== Championships and accomplishments ==
- Ultimate Fighting Championship
  - Fight of the Night (One time) vs. Aori Qileng

== Mixed martial arts record ==
Professional record breakdown
13 matches	11 wins	2 losses
By knockout	4	0
By submission	4	1
By decision	3	1

Res.	Record	Opponent	Method	Event	Date	Round	Time	Location	Notes
Win	11–2	Zhalgas Zhumagulov	Decision (split)	UFC Fight Night: Volkov vs. Rozenstruik	June 4, 2022	3	5:00	Las Vegas, Nevada, United States	
Win	10–2	Daniel da Silva	TKO (elbows and punches)	UFC Fight Night: Costa vs. Vettori	October 23, 2021	2	0:46	Las Vegas, Nevada, United States	
Win	9–2	Aori Qileng	Decision (unanimous)	UFC 261	April 24, 2021	3	5:00	Jacksonville, Florida, United States	Fight of the Night.
Win	8–2	Jacob Silva	Decision (unanimous)	Dana White's Contender Series 30	August 25, 2020	3	5:00	Las Vegas, Nevada, United States	
Win	7–2	Kenny Porter	Submission (arm-triangle choke)	FAC 2	February 22, 2020	2	2:38	Independence, Missouri, United States	
Win	6–2	Chance Wilson	Submission (rear-naked choke)	LFA 76	September 13, 2019	1	2:01	Park City, Kansas, United States	Catchweight (130 lb) bout.
Win	5–2	Johnnie Roades	Submission (rear-naked choke)	KC Fighting Alliance 34	July 27, 2019	1	4:16	Independence, Missouri, United States	Bantamweight bout.
Win	4–2	Joey Estrada	TKO (submission to punches)	KC Fighting Alliance 30	September 22, 2018	1	4:15	Independence, Missouri, United States	
Win	3–2	Joey Scanlan	TKO (punches)	Carden Combat Sports 4	May 26, 2018	1	0:51	Kansas City, Kansas, United States	
Win	2–2	Chance Camacho	TKO (punches)	KC Fighting Alliance 27	February 17, 2018	2	1:22	Independence, Missouri, United States	Bantamweight bout.
Loss	1–2	Nate Smith	Decision (split)	Victory FC: Fight Night Coco Key	September 29, 2017	3	5:00	Omaha, Nebraska, United States	
Win	1–1	Delfino Benitez	Submission (rear-naked choke)	Victory FC 58	July 22, 2017	1	4:43	Omaha, Nebraska, United States	Flyweight debut.
Loss	0–1	Steven Merrill	Submission (rear-naked choke)	Victory FC: Fight Night at Harrahs 5	June 3, 2017	1	1:03	Council Bluffs, Iowa, United States	

== See also ==
- List of current UFC fighters
- List of male mixed martial artists
- List of UFC bonus award recipients
