= Daniel Marcos =

Peruvian mixed martial artist

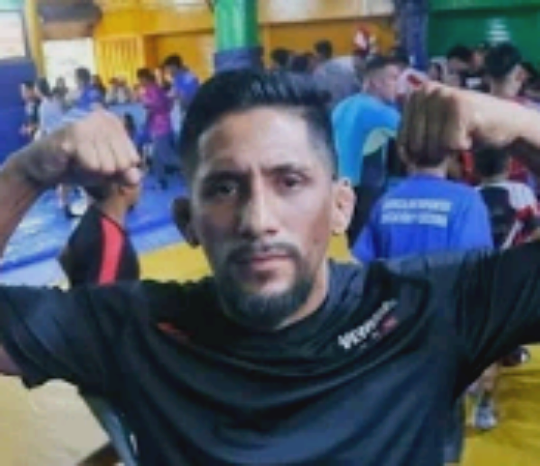
- Marcos in 2024
- Born: Daniel Aaron Marcos Moreno; March 7, 1993 (age 33); Lima, Peru
- Nickname: Soncora
- Height: 5 ft 7 in (1.70 m)
- Weight: 135 lb (61 kg)
- Division: Bantamweight
- Reach: 69 in (175 cm)
- Fighting out of: Boca Raton, Florida, U.S.
- Team: American Combat Gym
- Years active: 2015–present

Mixed martial arts record
- Total: 21
- Wins: 19
- By knockout: 9
- By submission: 1
- By decision: 9
- Losses: 1
- By decision: 1
- No contests: 1

Other information
- Mixed martial arts record from Sherdog

Daniel Aaron Marcos Moreno (born March 7, 1993) is a Peruvian professional mixed martial artist. He competed in the Bantamweight division of the Ultimate Fighting Championship (UFC). He is also a former 300 Sparta Bantamweight Champion.

== Background ==
Born on March 7, 1993, in Peru. His interest in mixed martial arts began at the age of 21.

Marcos, since the age of nine, played in the San Miguel towers. He wanted to play for "U" (Club Universitario de Deportes), but he couldn't due to financial reasons.

Marcos worked as a mobile phone lines salesman until his coach convinced him to quit his job to pursue mixed martial arts.

== Mixed martial arts career ==
=== Early career ===
Marcos made his amateur debut in 2015, at the age of 21. After six consecutive victories and no defeats, Marcos began his professional career.

He debuted in professional MMA on September 11, 2015, at the age of 22, at the '300 SPARTA 8' event. Marcos faced, and defeated by technical knockout, Marcos Cubas.

In his early professional MMA career, Marcos fought in Peru, accumulating a 12-0 record with seven finishes, all by TKO or KO. He became the bantamweight champion of 300 Sparta by facing Wanderson Targino on March 10, 2017, where he won the fight by unanimous decision. He subsequently defended the title successfully six times.

=== Dana White's Contender Series ===
On September 13, 2022, Marcos faced Brandon Lewis for a UFC contract on Dana White's Contender Series Season 6, Week 8. Marcos won the contract by defeating Lewis via unanimous decision.

=== Ultimate Fighting Championship ===
Marcos made his promotional debut against Saimon Oliveira on January 21, 2023, at UFC 283. He won the fight by KO in the second round.

Marcos faced Davey Grant on July 22, 2023, at UFC Fight Night 224. He won the fight by split decision. 12 of 14 media outlets scored the contest for Grant.

Marcos was scheduled to face Daniel Santos on November 4, 2023, at UFC Fight Night 231. However, Santos pulled out due to undisclosed reasons and was replaced by promotional newcomer Victor Hugo. However, the bout was scrapped after Hugo weighed in at 138.5 pounds, two and a half pounds over the bantamweight non-title fight limit.

Marcos was scheduled to face Carlos Vera on December 9, 2023, at UFC Fight Night 233. However, the fight was canceled due to visa issues on Marcos's part.

Marcos faced Aori Qileng on February 10, 2024, at UFC Fight Night 236. The fight resulted in a no contest due to repeated accidental low blows.

Marcos faced John Castañeda on June 8, 2024, at UFC on ESPN 57. He won the fight by unanimous decision.

Marcos was scheduled to face Said Nurmagomedov on December 14, 2024, at UFC on ESPN 63. However, Nurmagomedov withdrew from the fight for unknown reasons and was replaced by Adrian Yañez. Marcos won the fight by split decision.

Marcos faced Montel Jackson on May 3, 2025 at UFC on ESPN 67. He dropped the fight via unanimous decision, resulting in his first career defeat.

Marcos was scheduled to face Felipe Lima on November 22, 2025, at UFC Fight Night 265. However, Lima withdrew for unknown reasons, so Marcos was re-scheduled to face Miles Johns instead two weeks earlier on November 8, 2025, at UFC Fight Night 264. Marcos won the fight via a rear-naked choke submission in the second round.

On May 29, 2026, it was reported that Marcos was removed from the UFC roster after completed his fight contract and was not renewed by the promotion.

=== Professional Fighters League ===
On June 1, 2026, it was reported that Marcos signed with the Professional Fighters League.

In his PFL debut, Marcos faced Magomed Magomedov on August 22, 2026, at PFL Tampa. He won the bout via technical knockout in round three after Magomedov suffered a shoulder injury.

== Personal life ==
Marcos married his wife, Katia Ponce, on January 19, 2022, in Peru, and they have 2 children.

== Championships and accomplishments ==
- 300 Sparta
  - 300 Sparta Bantamweight Champion (One time)
    - Six successful title defenses

== Mixed martial arts record ==
Professional record breakdown
21 matches	19 wins	1 loss
By knockout	9	0
By submission	1	0
By decision	9	1
No contests	1	

Res.	Record	Opponent	Method	Event	Date	Round	Time	Location	Notes
Win	19–1 (1)	Magomed Magomedov	TKO (corner stoppage)	PFL Tampa: Cyborg vs. Vieira	August 22, 2026	3	0:11	Tampa, Florida, United States	
Win	18–1 (1)	Miles Johns	Technical Submission (rear-naked choke)	UFC Fight Night: Bonfim vs. Brown	November 8, 2025	2	4:23	Las Vegas, Nevada, United States	
Loss	17–1 (1)	Montel Jackson	Decision (unanimous)	UFC on ESPN: Sandhagen vs. Figueiredo	May 3, 2025	3	5:00	Des Moines, Iowa, United States	
Win	17–0 (1)	Adrian Yañez	Decision (split)	UFC on ESPN: Covington vs. Buckley	December 14, 2024	3	5:00	Tampa, Florida, United States	
Win	16–0 (1)	John Castañeda	Decision (unanimous)	UFC on ESPN: Cannonier vs. Imavov	June 8, 2024	3	5:00	Louisville, Kentucky, United States	
NC	15–0 (1)	Aori Qileng	NC (accidental groin kick)	UFC Fight Night: Hermansson vs. Pyfer	February 10, 2024	2	3:28	Las Vegas, Nevada, United States	Accidental groin strike rendered Qileng unable to continue.
Win	15–0	Davey Grant	Decision (split)	UFC Fight Night: Aspinall vs. Tybura	July 22, 2023	3	5:00	London, England	
Win	14–0	Saimon Oliveira	KO (knee to the body and punches)	UFC 283	January 21, 2023	2	2:18	Rio de Janeiro, Brazil	
Win	13–0	Brandon Lewis	Decision (unanimous)	Dana White's Contender Series 54	September 13, 2022	3	5:00	Las Vegas, Nevada United States	
Win	12–0	Gaston Manzur	TKO (punches)	300 Sparta 36	December 3, 2019	2	3:04	Lima, Peru	Defended the 300 Sparta Bantamweight Championship.
Win	11–0	Roy Quispe	TKO (doctor stoppage)	300 Sparta 30	March 16, 2019	2	5:00	Chimbote, Peru	Defended the 300 Sparta Bantamweight Championship.
Win	10–0	Gabriel Pimenta	Decision (unanimous)	300 Sparta 26	June 15, 2018	3	5:00	Lima, Peru	Defended the 300 Sparta Bantamweight Championship.
Win	9–0	Cristian Jose Herrera	TKO (punches)	300 Sparta 22	October 27, 2017	2	4:11	Lima, Peru	Defended the 300 Sparta Bantamweight Championship.
Win	8–0	Marlon Cardoso dos Santos	Decision (unanimous)	300 Sparta 20	September 1, 2017	3	5:00	Lima, Peru	Defended the 300 Sparta Bantamweight Championship
Win	7–0	Luis Zuniga	KO (flying knee)	300 Sparta 18	April 28, 2017	1	0:47	Breña, Peru	Defended the 300 Sparta Bantamweight Championship
Win	6–0	Wanderson Targino	Decision (unanimous)	300 Sparta 17	March 10, 2017	3	5:00	Lima, Peru	Won the vacant 300 Sparta Bantamweight Championship
Win	5–0	Andres Cordero Cordova	TKO (punches)	300 Sparta 13	September 30, 2016	1	1:22	Lima, Peru	
Win	4–0	Miguel Martinez	Decision (split)	Tatya FC 7	May 12, 2016	3	3:00	Lima, Peru	
Win	3–0	Luis Dapello	Decision (unanimous)	300 Sparta 9	February 18, 2016	3	5:00	Lima, Peru	Bantamweight debut.
Win	2–0	Jorge Antonio Enciso Huaman	TKO (retirement)	Inka FC: Warriors 5	December 16, 2015	1	5:00	Lima, Peru	
Win	1–0	Marco Cubas	TKO (punches)	300 Sparta 8	September 11, 2015	2	3:31	Lima, Peru	Featherweight debut

== See also ==
- List of male mixed martial artists
