= Andy Pi =

Chinese martial artist

- Born: 畢思安; 1973 (age 52–53); Taiwan
- Style: Brazilian jiu-jitsu
- Team: Beijing Jiujitsu Academy
- Trainer: Royce Gracie
- Rank: Black belt in Brazilian Jiu-Jitsu

Other information
- Occupation: Founder of Art of War Fighting Championship; Founder of Beijing Jiujitsu Academy
- University: University of California, Riverside

Andy Pi (Chinese: 畢思安; born 1973) is a Chinese Brazilian jiu-jitsu (BJJ) practitioner and businessman. He is best known as a founder of Art of War Fighting Championship (AOW), the first professional mixed martial arts (MMA) promotion in China. In addition he opened the first BJJ academy in Beijing in 1998. In 2003, he defeated Xu Xiaodong via submission in one of the earliest televised MMA bouts in China which helped popularize BJJ in the country.

He is considered the Godfather of MMA (alongside Zhao Xuejun) and BJJ in China due to his contribution in building the MMA and BJJ scenes there.

== Early life and education ==
Pi was born in Taiwan but moved to California at an early age and was raised there. His grandfather was a general in Chiang Kai Shek's air force.

He grew up idolizing Bruce Lee and trained in Karate and Kung Fu.

He attended the University of California, Riverside graduating in 1995 with a degree in Psychology.

In 1994, during his time in college, he saw a video of an Ultimate Fighting Championship event. He noticed how Royce Gracie would win all the fights by taking down people bigger than him and forcing them to give up without hurting them. This would inspire him to attend the Gracie University of Jiu-Jitsu in Torrance where he learnt BJJ.

== Career ==
In 1997, Pi received his Blue belt in BJJ under Royce Gracie and in the same year moved to Beijing with his parents. As no one in China knew what BJJ was, Pi saw an opportunity and in 1998 opened the first BJJ academy in Beijing where he would introduce the art to students.

In 1999, Pi met a Brazilian-Arab in a business trip where they became good friends. He then took some Chinese judo practitioners to compete at the ADCC Submission Fighting World Championships. Although they were not successful, it was Pi's first hand experience of BJJ at international competitive level.

In 2003, after his gym established its reputation, Pi was invited to attend what would be one of the earliest domestic MMA competitions in China which was also televised. The competition was held at an Akkido dojo. In the competition he was paired up against Xu Xiaodong, a Sanda fighter. During the fight, Xu broke Pi's forearm early with a kick. However Pi managed to eventually get Xu to the ground where he won via Armbar submission.

After the fight, Pi noted how the competition lacked any real formal supervision such as doctors, judges etc leading to concern MMA and BJJ might get banned in China due to insufficient fighter protection. As a result he and his younger brother Konrad, an Investment Manager came up with an idea to create an MMA promotion in China. They noted the difficulty in execution due to the restrictions formed by the Chinese government as well as the difficulty of raising money for a big promotion.

Using their father's business executive with ties to China as well as relentless sales approach, they successfully made contact with the Chinese government and obtained the proper permits for hosting a sporting event. They eventually found a few potential sponsors, including football star Rashaan Salaam. The promotion was called Art of War Fighting Championship and was owned by the Pi's privately held sports management company, the Adoria Entertainment Group.

When setting up the promotion, Pi sought out grapplers to compete in it. He met Zhao Xuejun, a renowned Sanda coach who convinced Pi that he didn't need to seek out pure grapplers and that Sanda fighters were just as capable of competing in MMA. Since then Zhao has moved his focus from Sanda to MMA and has worked to develop fighters to compete in the sport at Xi'an Sports University.

On 6 November 2005, AOW conducted its first event at the Beijing Sport University. The event was so packed there were people lined up outside every window trying to get a look inside. This made it the first regulated professional MMA event held in China.

To date, AOW has held 15 events in mainland China. Its largest event was Art of War 12 - Invincible, held at the National Olympic Sports Center Auditorium in Beijing on 23 May 2009 to an audience of around 6,000 fans. The event attracted many international guests, including former UFC Heavyweight Champion Tim Sylvia, renowned ring announcer Michael Buffer, and experienced referee "Big" John McCarthy.

In terms of the China MMA scene, AOW has produced Zhang Tiequan who fought on its inaugural event. He would go on to be the first fighter from China to not only fight in the UFC but also win a fight in the promotion where he defeated Jason Reinhardt at UFC 127 via guillotine choke. Since then Zhang has founded China Top Team gym and acted as coach to ranked UFC fighters such as Li Jingliang and Yan Xiaonan.

On 2015, Vice Media did a documentary on the growth of MMA in China which featured Pi as well as former UFC fighter, Andy Wang.

== Fight record ==
Fight record
1 win (1 Submission)
Date	Result	Opponent	Location	Method	Time	Record
2003	Win	(China) Xu Xiaodong	Beijing, China	Submission (Armbar)		
Legend: Win Loss Draw/No contest Exhibition Notes

== Personal ==
Pi currently lives in Beijing with his wife and three children. He still continues to run Beijing Jiujitsu Academy. In addition he is also a coach in China's national jiu-jitsu team.
