= Xu Xiaodong =

Chinese mixed martial artist and YouTuber

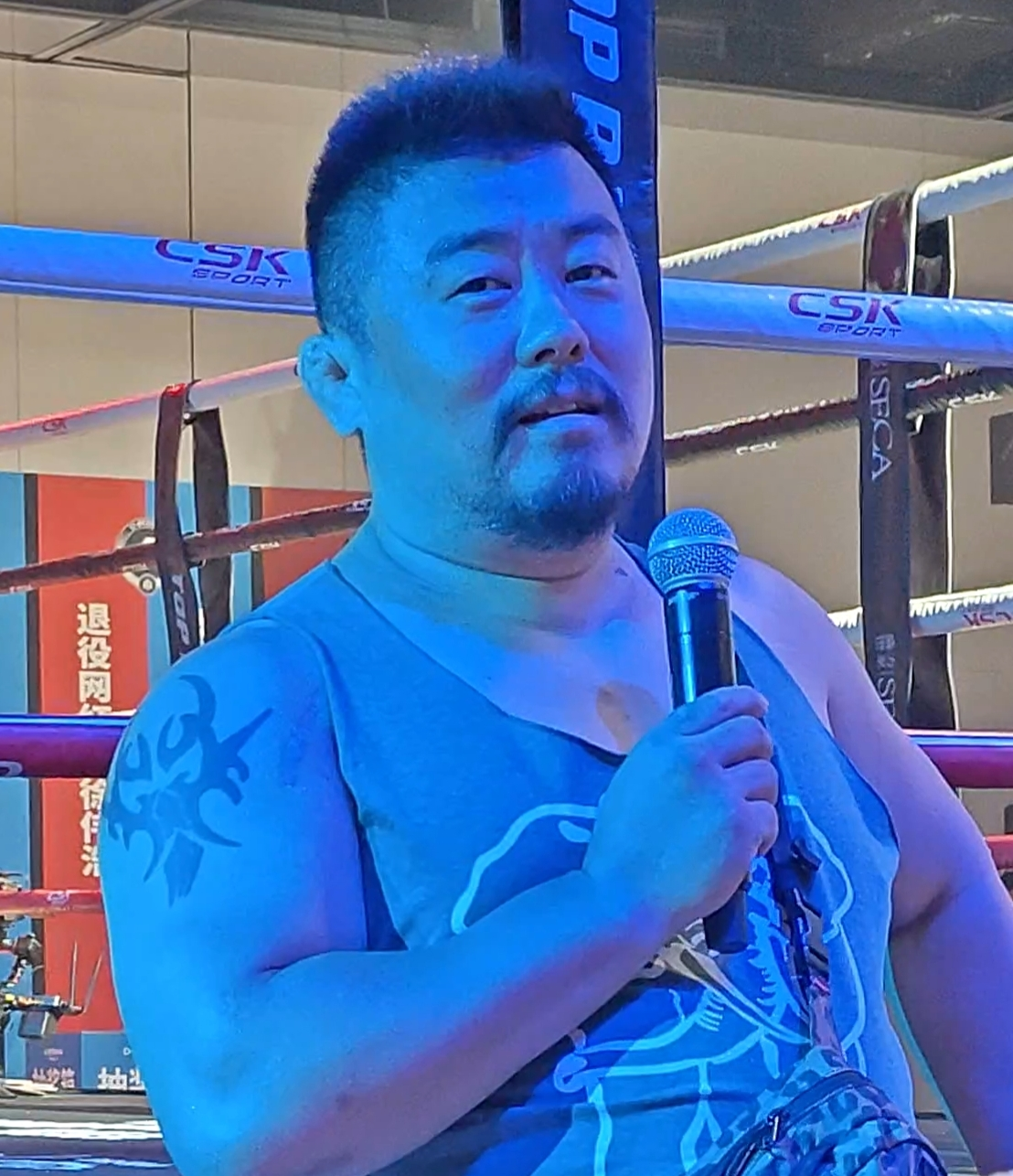
- Born: 15 November 1979 (age 46); Beijing, China
- Native name: 徐晓冬
- Style: Sanda

Other information
- Occupation: Mixed martial artist, Youtuber, political commentator

Chinese name
- Traditional Chinese: 徐曉冬
- Simplified Chinese: 徐晓冬
Transcriptions
Standard Mandarin
- Hanyu Pinyin: Xú Xiǎodōng
- IPA: [ɕǔ ɕjàʊ.tʊ́ŋ]

Xu Xiaodong (Chinese: 徐晓冬; pinyin: Xú Xiǎodōng; born 15 November 1979), is a Chinese mixed martial artist who is known for challenging and fighting fraudulent and traditional martial artists. He gained prominence online after he was filmed defeating self-proclaimed Tai chi master Wei Lei in 2017.

== Early life ==
Xu was born on 15 November 1979 in Beijing. In 1996, he entered Beijing Shichahai Sports School, where he was trained in sanshou and boxing under Mei Huizhi (梅惠志) and Zhang Xingzheng (张兴正). He competed at least twice at the Beijing Sanshou Invitational Tournament, finishing as the champion and the first runner-up, respectively. He became a sanshou coach at Shishahai School after graduation.

== Mixed martial arts career ==
In 2001, Xu began training for mixed martial arts (MMA) and Muay Thai. He was drawn to the fighting style because of how free it was. A year later, he, Anpei (安培) and Wang Yu (王宇) founded the first MMA team in Beijing, Bad Boys (恶童军团). In 2003, Xu fought against Brazilian jiu-jitsu practitioner, Andy Pi (毕思安) in a televised bout. During the fight, Xu broke Pi's forearm with a kick, but Pi managed to eventually get Xu to the ground where he won via armbar submission. Pi would later go on to found the first professional MMA promotion in China, Art of War Fighting Championship.

In 2004, Xu tore his Cruciate ligament in a football match and had to get it reconstructed at Peking University Third Hospital. It was considered a partial disability which as a result led him to transition to full time coaching in 2005.

=== Challenge on fraudulent martial arts masters ===
Xu was frustrated by what he saw as fraud and hypocrisy amongst martial arts practitioners, wanting to demonstrate the superiority of modern fighting styles. Some people in China believe that kung fu masters have supernatural powers, and self-described masters, including the self-described tai chi master Wei Lei, were known to make such claims online. Xu started a dispute with Wei on social media, beginning with a demand that Wei provide evidence of his abilities, and culminating in a bare-knuckle fight in a basement in Chengdu in 2017, where Xu won convincingly via TKO in less than 20 seconds.

After the fight went viral, there was significant blowback on social media where he was accused of disparaging Chinese culture, and his family received death threats. Beverage tycoon Chen Sheng offered over a million US dollars to any traditional tai chi fighter who could beat Xu. Following this, police stopped another fight by Xu against another self-proclaimed tai chi master, Ma Baoguo, who allegedly called them in, and Xu was banned for organizing tournaments at his gym. However, Xu continued to fight self-proclaimed tai chi masters.

In 2018, Xu was notoriously injured fighting in a series of sparring matches at a Chinese MMA gym. During his fourth round, pitted against Yan Shuaiqi, Xu received a series of knees to the face and was left with a fractured skull and needing 26 stitches around his eyebrow. Yan later apologized for injuring him, but Xu assured he did not care, stating, "if traditional martial artists could beat me the way these MMA fighters did then I'd be so happy". During this year, Xu would also receive vocal support from Shaolin abbot Shi Yongxin, who claimed that Xu's actions against fake kung fu artists were good for the traditional art forms.

Xu was sued for defamation in 2019 for calling tai chi Grandmaster Chen Xiaowang a fraud, and the Chinese court ordered him to pay Chen approximately US$60,000 in damages and to apologize for seven consecutive days on social media. After refusing to do this, his credit rating was lowered to the point where he could not rent, own property, stay in certain hotels, travel on high speed rail, or buy plane tickets. The restrictions were lifted after he paid US$40,000 in both legal fees and the cost of placing the apology.

In May 2019, Xu defeated another martial artist, but was only able to do so wearing clown makeup to hide his face and by fighting under a pseudonym. It took him 36 hours to reach the fight location due to his low credit score, and Chinese search engines reportedly had stopped listing him. Later that year, Xu had to wear Peking Opera face paint and cover his back tattoo during his hybrid rules fight with Japanese kickboxer Yuichiro Nagashima so that the fight which took place in Thailand could stream in China. The fight was hosted under kickboxing rules in the first round and mixed martial arts in the second, and saw Xiaodong eventually winning by TKO by ground and pound in the second round.

By defeating Nagashima, Xu believed that he could pressure kung fu fighter Yi Long, whom Xu had claimed has rigged competitions, to face him in a match. Yi Long had previously criticized Xu for his attitude and claimed that Xu himself is in fact a fraud.

In November 2019, an Iron Palm master threatened to break Xu's arm in a fight, but apologized and backed down after Xu accepted and suggested putting 200,000 yuan on the outcome.

In July 2020, the Chinese Wushu Association urged practitioners to refrain from calling themselves "master". This was interpreted by Bloody Elbow (MMA news site) and Radii China as being in response to Xu's complaints about "kung fu fakery". In November, Xiaodong defeated Chen Yong, a tai chi master who had challenged him in 2018, in only 10 seconds.

== Political views ==
In June 2019, Xu made a video on YouTube claiming that he wished to become an Australian citizen while commenting on Chinese actors who live abroad or have foreign passports, claiming that "all patriots are going abroad … long live China".

In August 2019, Xu spoke out on Twitter, Sina Weibo, and YouTube questioning the government's reporting of the Hong Kong protests, stating that the Chinese government was running a "smear campaign", and met with human rights lawyer Chen Qiushi who had shared similar views. Xu has also clarified on his YouTube account that his statements were about how the mainland government should adhere to the One China, Two Systems policy as promised, rather than a call for Hong Kong independence. He was subsequently visited by Chinese authorities and had his Sina Weibo account wiped for the eighth time.

After Chen Qiushi disappeared while reporting on the COVID-19 outbreak in Wuhan, Xu, a friend of Chen, gave updates on both his and Chen's YouTube channels reporting Chen was uncontactable by family and friends while police claimed Chen had merely been placed in isolation. Xu would later claim that Chen was in a "safe place" but under government supervision.

Xu has also come to the defense of Fang Fang, a Chinese author living in Wuhan who published the Wuhan Diary which related the experiences of people living under lock down in the city by the Chinese government. Fang Fang received widespread criticism from Chinese nationalists, including Tai Chi practitioner Wei Lei, who was defeated by Xu in 2017. Wei called for martial artists in Wuhan to assault Fang for her work while Xu defended the author who he claims was mild in criticism and was being truthful in her accounts.

== YouTube channel ==
Xu has run a YouTube channel called Brother Dong's Hot Takes since 2015, consisting of 45-minute-long sports show style monologues, largely about MMA and his own experiences. He records the show in Beijing, and sends it to a friend in North America to upload. Most of his viewers are from Hong Kong, Taiwan, or are Chinese firewall jumpers.
