= Beijing Sport University =

Public university in Beijing, China

Coordinates: 40.0299048°N 116.3192935°E

- 北京体育大学
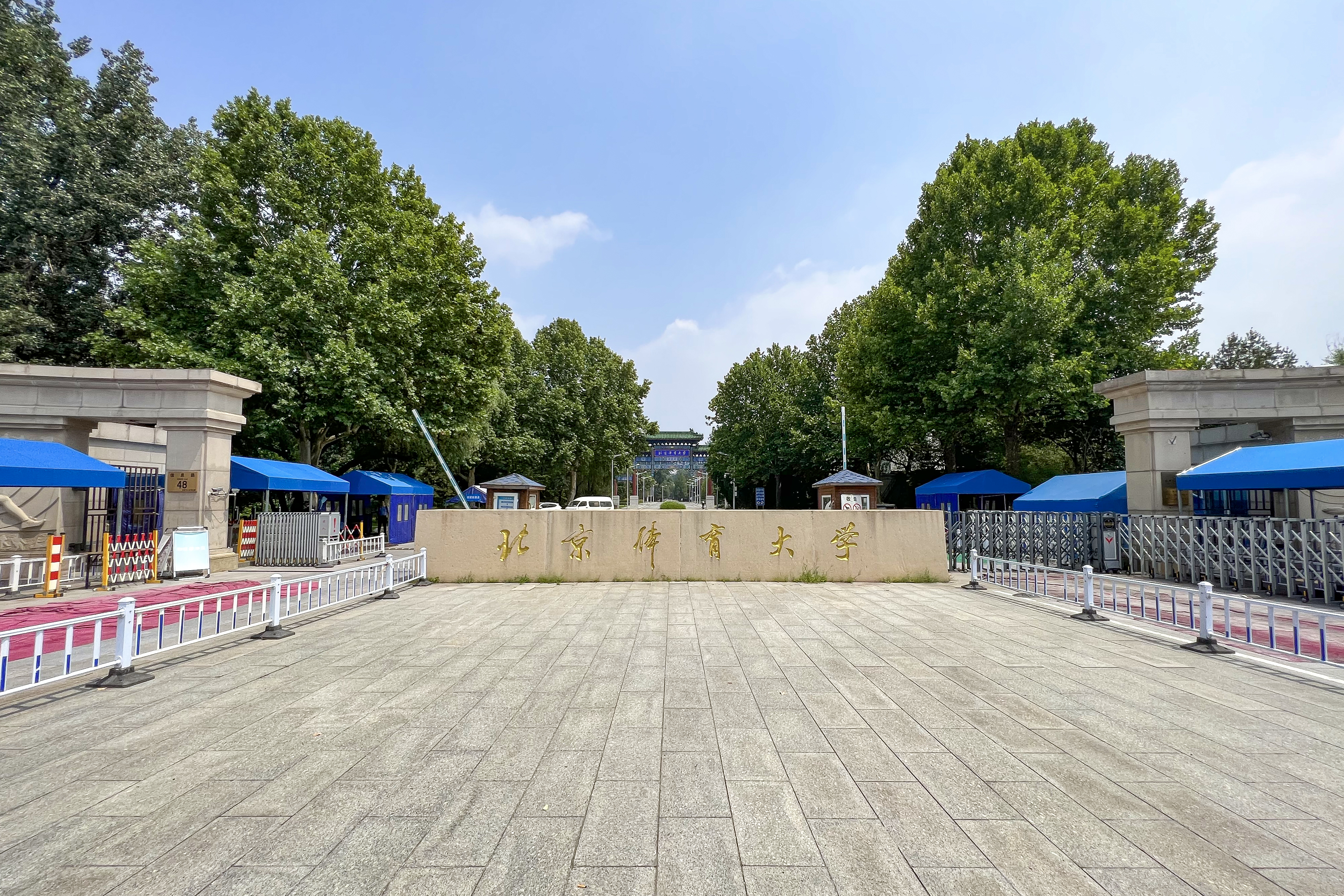
- Main gate
- Former names: Central Institute of Physical Education; Beijing Institute of Physical Education
- Type: Public/National
- Established: 1953; 73 years ago
- Affiliations: General Administration of Sport of China
- Faculty: 1,027
- Students: 14,000
- Location: Beijing, China
- Campus: Urban
- Website: www.bsu.edu.cn

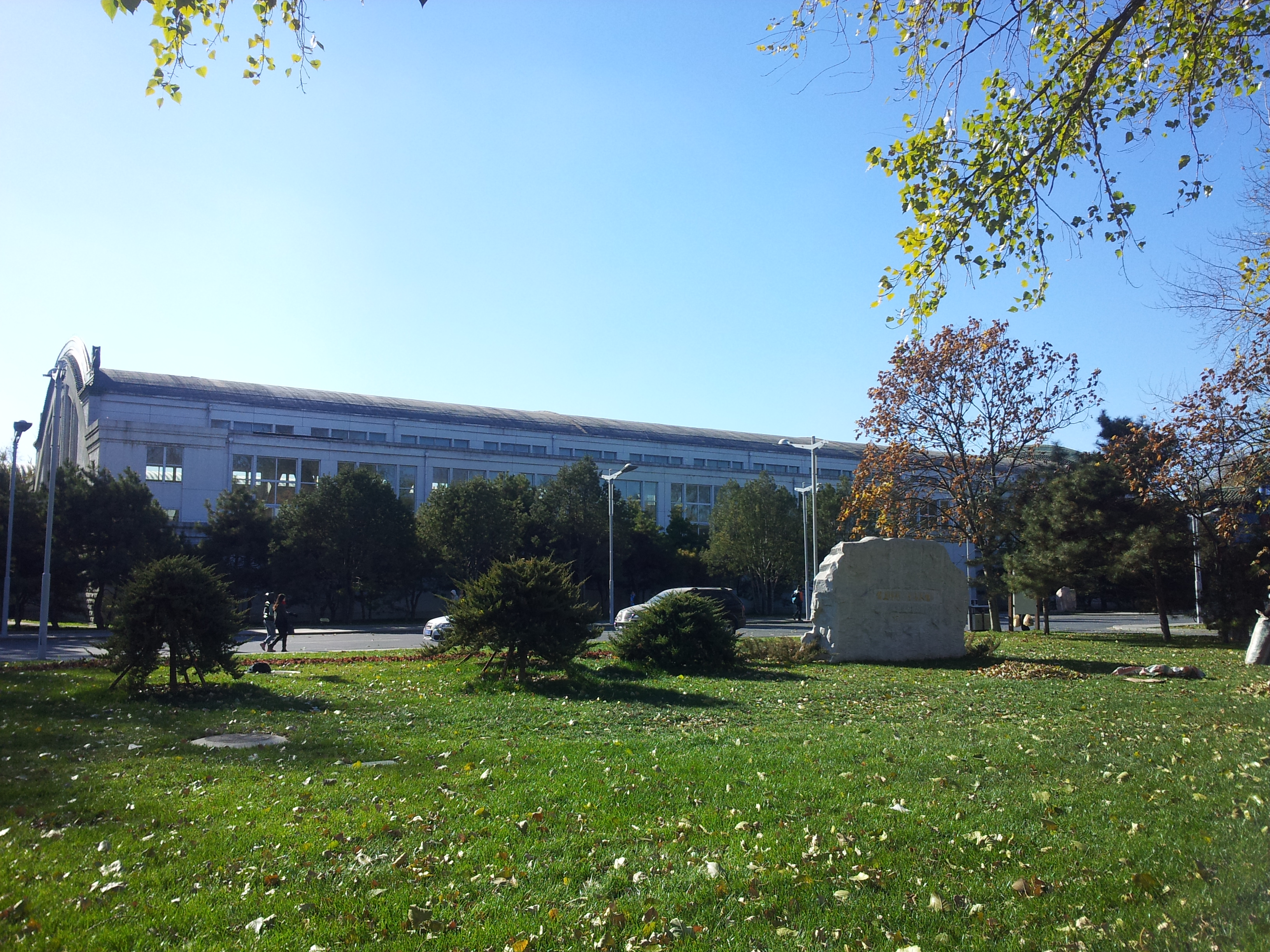
Beijing Sport University

Beijing Sport University (BSU; 北京体育大学) is a public university located in Beijing, China. It is part of the Project 211 and Double First-Class Construction. The university is affiliated with the General Administration of Sport of China.

== History ==
BSU was founded in 1953 as the Central Institute of Physical Education (中央体育学院). In 1960 the university was among the first batch of key national universities designated by the State Council. Situated in the Haidian District of Beijing, BSU covers a total area of approximately 1,400 acres, with a total construction area of approximately 600,000 square meters. BSU has a faculty of 1,027 with a current enrollment of 14,000 students with 8,265 undergraduates and 2,255 postgraduates. Beijing Sport University is the only university in China with the Category I discipline of sport science (a national key discipline). As of 2015 BSU teachers and students have collectively won 73 gold medals in the Olympic Games.

== Undergraduate programs ==
There are 39 undergraduate majors offered across 20 different colleges, covering a range of subjects in the humanities, sports science, education, the sciences, economic theory, and communications.

Undergraduate Majors at Beijing Sport University
Major	College	Tuition (2019 RMB)
Physical Education	Academy of Education Institute of Traditional Chinese Sports	5000
Sports Management	Academy of Business in Sport	5000
Sports Economic Management	Academy of Business in Sport	5000
Economics	Academy of Business in Sport	
Wushu and Traditional Sports	Institute of Traditional Chinese Sports	5500
Sports Science	School of Sports Science	6000
Sports Rehabilitation	School of Sports Medicine and Rehabilitation	6000
Leisure Sports	School of Recreation and Tourism	5500
Physical Training	Military-Civilian Training Academy	
Sports Training	Competitive Sports Academy	5500
Winter Sports	Competitive Sports Academy	5500
Sport Engineering	Sports Engineering Academy	
Education	Academy of Education	
Marxist Theory	Academy of Marxism	5000
Chinese Literature	Academy of Chinese Culture	
Chinese International Education	Academy of Humanities	5000
English	Foreign Language Academy	6000
Russian	Foreign Language Academy	6000
German	Foreign Language Academy	6000
French	Foreign Language Academy	6000
Spanish	Foreign Language Academy	6000
Portuguese	Foreign Language Academy	6000
Hungarian	Foreign Language Academy	6000
Polish	Foreign Language Academy	6000
Czech	Foreign Language Academy	6000
Croatian	Foreign Language Academy	6000
Serbian	Foreign Language Academy	6000
Journalism	Academy of News and Communications	5000
Marketing	Academy of News and Communications	5000
New Media	Academy of News and Communications	5000
Applied Psychology	Academy of Psychology	6000
Public Management	Academy of Management	5000
Tourism Management	Academy of Sports and Tourism	5000
Dance Performance	Academy of the Arts	10000
Choreography	Academy of the Arts	10000
Performance	Academy of the Arts	10000
Photography	Academy of the Arts	
Biomedical Engineering	Academy of Engineering	
Data Science	Academy of Engineering	6000

== See also ==
- Beijing Sport University F.C.
