= 2020 in UFC =

Mixed martial arts events

Information
- First date: January 18, 2020
- Last date: December 19, 2020

Events
- Total events: 46 (5 Cancelled)
- UFC: 11

Fights
- Total fights: 456
- Title fights: 19

Chronology
2019 in UFC	2020 in UFC	2021 in UFC

The year 2020 was the 28th year in the history of the Ultimate Fighting Championship (UFC), a mixed martial arts promotion based in the United States.

== Partnership ==
Starting in 2021, a partnership between the UFC and Dapper Labs's Flow platform for MMA fans to own, maintain and trade UFC-branded collectibles was announced on February 26, 2020.

Onwards from April 2021, the UFC announced Venum as their exclusive outfitting partner on July 11, 2020.

== 2020 UFC Honors awards ==
Starting in 2019, the UFC created year-end awards with "UFC Honors President's Choice Awards" for categories "Performance of the Year" and "Fight of the Year" being chosen by UFC CEO Dana White. The other "UFC Honors Fan Choice Awards" are for categories "Knockout of the Year", "Submission of the Year", "Event of the Year", "Comeback of the Year" and, from 2020, "Debut of the Year" in which fans are able to vote for the winner on social media.

Winners receive a trophy commemorating their achievement along with a set of tires from sponsor Toyo Tires.

2020 UFC Honors Awards
	Performance of the Year	Fight of the Year	Knockout of the Year	Submission of the Year	Debut of the Year	Event of the Year	Comeback of the Year
Winner	Joaquin Buckley defeats Impa Kasanganay; UFC Fight Night: Moraes vs. Sandhagen	Zhang Weili defeats Joanna Jędrzejczyk 1 UFC 248	Joaquin Buckley defeats Impa Kasanganay; UFC Fight Night: Moraes vs. Sandhagen	Khabib Nurmagomedov defeats Justin Gaethje; UFC 254	Khamzat Chimaev defeats John Phillips; UFC on ESPN: Kattar vs. Ige	UFC 256: Figueiredo vs. Moreno	Beneil Dariush defeats Drakkar Klose; UFC 248
Nominee	Kevin Holland defeats Ronaldo Souza; UFC 256	Dustin Poirier defeats Dan Hooker; UFC on ESPN: Poirier vs. Hooker	Cody Garbrandt defeats Raphael Assunção; UFC 250	Ariane Lipski defeats Luana Carolina; UFC 285	Jiří Procházka defeats Volkan Oezdemir; UFC 251	UFC 249: Ferguson vs. Gaethje	Chase Hooper defeats Peter Barrett; UFC 256
Nominee	Cody Garbrandt defeats Raphael Assunção; UFC 250	Josh Emmett defeats Shane Burgos; UFC on ESPN: Blaydes vs. Volkov	Kevin Holland defeats Ronaldo Souza; UFC 256	Mackenzie Dern defeats Hannah Cifers; UFC on ESPN: Woodley vs. Burns	Khaos Williams defeats Alex Morono; UFC 247	UFC 250: Nunes vs. Spencer	Daniel Rodriguez defeats Dwight Grant; UFC on ESPN: Munhoz vs. Edgar
Nominee	Charles Oliveira defeats Kevin Lee; UFC Fight Night: Lee vs. Oliveira	Deiveson Figueiredo draws with Brandon Moreno 1 UFC 256	Khaos Williams defeats Abdul Razak Alhassan; UFC Fight Night: Felder vs. dos Anjos	Jimmy Flick defeats Cody Durden; UFC Fight Night: Thompson vs. Neal	Jordan Leavitt defeats Matt Wiman; UFC on ESPN: Hermansson vs. Vettori	UFC 251: Usman vs. Masvidal	Damon Jackson defeats Mirsad Bektić; UFC Fight Night: Covington vs. Woodley
Ref							

== 2020 UFC.com awards ==
2020 UFC.COM Awards
No	Best Fighter	The Upsets	The Submissions	The Newcomers	The Knockouts	The Fights
1	Deiveson Figueiredo	Roxanne Modafferi defeats Maycee Barber; UFC 246	Ariane Lipski defeats Luana Carolina; UFC 285	Khamzat Chimaev	Joaquin Buckley defeats Impa Kasanganay; UFC Fight Night: Moraes vs. Sandhagen	Zhang Weili defeats Joanna Jędrzejczyk 1 UFC 248
2	Jan Błachowicz	Shana Dobson defeats Mariya Agapova; UFC on ESPN: Munhoz vs. Edgar	Mackenzie Dern defeats Hannah Cifers; UFC on ESPN: Woodley vs. Burns	Joaquin Buckley	Cody Garbrandt defeats Raphael Assunção; UFC 250	Deiveson Figueiredo draws with Brandon Moreno 1 UFC 256
3	Kevin Holland	Julian Erosa defeats Sean Woodson; UFC on ESPN: Poirier vs. Hooker	Aljamain Sterling defeats Cory Sandhagen; UFC 250	Brandon Royval	Sean O'Malley defeats Eddie Wineland; UFC 250	Dustin Poirier defeats Dan Hooker; UFC on ESPN: Poirier vs. Hooker
4	Gilbert Burns	Khaos Williams defeats Alex Morono; UFC 247	Khabib Nurmagomedov defeats Justin Gaethje; UFC 254	Khaos Williams	Kevin Holland defeats Ronaldo Souza; UFC 256	Josh Emmett defeats Shane Burgos; UFC on ESPN: Blaydes vs. Volkov
5	Khamzat Chimaev	Justin Jaynes defeats Frank Camacho; UFC on ESPN: Blaydes vs. Volkov	Charles Oliveira defeats Kevin Lee; UFC Fight Night: Lee vs. Oliveira	Jiří Procházka	Khamzat Chimaev defeats Gerald Meerschaert; UFC Fight Night: Covington vs. Woodley	Dan Hooker defeats Paul Felder; UFC Fight Night: Felder vs. Hooker
6	Valentina Shevchenko	Marlon Vera defeats Sean O'Malley 1 UFC 252	Jimmy Flick defeats Cody Durden; UFC Fight Night: Thompson vs. Neal	Jamahal Hill	Khaos Williams defeats Abdul Razak Alhassan; UFC Fight Night: Felder vs. dos Anjos	Justin Gaethje defeats Tony Ferguson; UFC 249
7	Brandon Moreno	Daniel Rodriguez defeats Tim Means; UFC Fight Night: Anderson vs. Błachowicz 2	Jack Hermansson defeats Kelvin Gastelum; UFC Fight Night: Figueiredo vs. Benavidez 2	Youssef Zalal	Beneil Dariush defeats Drakkar Klose; UFC 248	Rose Namajunas defeats Jéssica Andrade 2 UFC 251
8	Glover Teixeira	Jan Błachowicz defeats Dominick Reyes; UFC 253	Thiago Moisés defeats Michael Johnson; UFC Fight Night: Smith vs. Teixeira	Ilia Topuria	Jordan Leavitt defeats Matt Wiman; UFC on ESPN: Hermansson vs. Vettori	Frankie Edgar defeats Pedro Munhoz; UFC on ESPN: Munhoz vs. Edgar
9	Charles Oliveira	Daniel Pineda defeats Herbert Burns; UFC 252	Deiveson Figueiredo defeats Joseph Benavidez 2 UFC Fight Night: Figueiredo vs. Benavidez 2	Tom Aspinall	Calvin Kattar defeats Jeremy Stephens; UFC 283	Jon Jones defeats Dominick Reyes; UFC 247
10	Israel Adesanya	Brandon Royval defeats Tim Elliott; UFC on ESPN: Woodley vs. Burns	Germaine de Randamie defeats Julianna Peña; UFC on ESPN: Holm vs. Aldana	Chris Daukaus	Beneil Dariush defeats Scott Holtzman; UFC Fight Night: Lewis vs. Oleinik	Vicente Luque defeats Niko Price 2 UFC 249
Ref						

== 2020 by the numbers ==
The numbers below records the events, fights, techniques, champions and fighters held or performed for the year of 2020 in UFC.

Events
Number of Events	PPV	Continents	Countries	Cities	Fight Night Bonuses
41	11	4	4	9	167; Total $8,350,000
Longest Event	Shortest Event	Highest Income Live Gate	Lowest Income Live Gate	Highest Attendance	Lowest Attendance
UFC 251 3:07:27	UFC Fight Night: Overeem vs. Sakai 1:17:33	UFC 246 $11,089,129.30	UFC Fight Night: Benavidez vs. Figueiredo $402,958	UFC 246 19,040	UFC Fight Night: Anderson vs. Błachowicz 2 6,449
Title Fights
Undisputed Title Fights	Title Changes	Champions Remained in Their Divisions	Number of Champions	Number of Interim Champions	Number of Title Defenses
18	0	10; FLY – Deiveson Figueiredo; FW – Alexander Volkanovski; LW – Khabib Nurmagomedov; WW – Kamaru Usman; MW – Israel Adesanya; HW – Stipe Miocic; WSW – Zhang Weili; WFYW – Valentina Shevchenko; WBW – Amanda Nunes; WFW – Amanda Nunes	13	2	15
Champions
Division	Beginning of The Year	End of The Year	Division	Beginning of The Year	End of The Year
Heavyweight	Stipe Miocic	Stipe Miocic	Bantamweight	Henry Cejudo	Petr Yan
Light Heavyweight	Jon Jones	Jan Błachowicz	Flyweight	Henry Cejudo	Deiveson Figueiredo
Middleweight	Israel Adesanya	Israel Adesanya	Women's Bantamweight	Amanda Nunes	Amanda Nunes
Welterweight	Kamaru Usman	Kamaru Usman	Women's Flyweight	Valentina Shevchenko	Valentina Shevchenko
Lightweight	Khabib Nurmagomedov	Khabib Nurmagomedov	Women's Strawweight	Zhang Weili	Zhang Weili
Featherweight	Alexander Volkanovski	Alexander Volkanovski	Women's Featherweight	Amanda Nunes	Amanda Nunes
Fights
Most Knockouts at A Single Event	Most submissions at A Single Event	Most Decisions at A Single Event	Total Number of Fights	Total Number of Cage Time	
UFC Fight Night: Hall vs. Silva 7	UFC Fight Night: Figueiredo vs. Benavidez 2 5	UFC Fight Night: Lee vs. Oliveira; UFC Fight Night: Thompson vs. Neal 9	456	83:33:19	
Knockouts	Submissions	Unanimous Decisions	Split Decisions	No Contests	
139	82	185	35	5	
Fighters
Number of Fighters	UFC Debutants	Releases / Retired	Fighters Suspended	Number of Fighters Missed weight	
(At the end of Dec 31, 2020); 576	123	93	40	46	
Champion feats
No UFC championships changed hands during the 2020 calendar year, marking the first year without a title change since 1999.; With his 14th title‑fight victory, Jon Jones set a new UFC record, surpassing the previous mark of 13 held by Georges St-Pierre.; Amanda Nunes became the first fighter to defend titles in two divisions while holding both championships simultaneously.; Joseph Benavidez became the first fighter to go 0–4 in undisputed championship bouts.; Khabib Nurmagomedov became the first fighter to win three consecutive title fights via submission.; Deiveson Figueiredo recorded the fastest turnaround between UFC championship fights at 21 days
Fighter feats
Aleksei Oleinik became the first fighter in MMA history to have victories in four separate decades (1990s, 2000s, 2010s, 2020s); Jon Jones became the first fighter to record 20 victories in a single UFC weight division, a feat later matched by Max Holloway in 2023.; Priscila Cachoeira's 40 second knockout at UFC Fight Night 168 was the fastest finish in women's flyweight history.; Angela Hill’s six bouts from March 23, 2019 to February 23, 2020 were the most in an 11‑month span. The record was later surpassed by Kevin Holland, who competed seven times between May 2020 and April 2021.; Israel Adesanya reached eight UFC wins in 755 days, the shortest span in which any fighter has achieved that mark.; Charles Oliveira's fifth guillotine-choke submission set a new record for the most in company history.; Curtis Blaydes set a new UFC heavyweight record by landing 14 takedowns in a single bout.; Dustin Poirier and Dan Hooker's 390 combined total strikes landed set the record for the most in a lightweight bout.; Khamzat Chimaev set the modern UFC record for the shortest timeframe to earn two victories, winning twice in just ten days.; Paul Craig became the first fighter to win via triangle-choke submission in three separate bouts.; Shana Dobson's win over Mariya Agapova marked the biggest betting‑odds upset in UFC history at +1250.; Hannah Cifers became the first fighter to suffer four consecutive losses in a calendar year.; Khamzat Chimaev set the modern UFC record for the shortest timeframe to earn three victories, winning three times in 66 days.; Glover Teixeira became the first in history to have five straight wins at the age of 40 or older.; Glover Teixeira set division records for the most submissions (6) and most finishes (12) in UFC light heavyweight history.

== Releases and retirements ==
These fighters have either been released from their UFC contracts, announced their retirement or joined other promotions:

Month	Day	ISO	Fighter	Division	Reason	Ref
January	1	(China)	Wuliji Buren	Bantamweight	Released	
January	7	(Canada)	Jordan Mein	Welterweight	Signed with Bellator MMA	
January	9	(United States)	Kyle Bochniak	Featherweight	Released	
January	11	(Brazil)	Thiago Alves	Welterweight	Released	
January	15	(South Korea)	Jin Soon Son	Bantamweight	Released	
January	22	(United States)	Gina Mazany	Women's Bantamweight	Released	
January	28	(France)	Nordine Taleb	Welterweight	Signed with ARES FC	
January	30	(United States)	Desmond Green	Lightweight	Released	
February	3	(United States)	Alex White	Featherweight	Released	
February	11	(United States)	Ben Saunders	Welterweight	Released	
February	11	(Canada)	Brad Katona	Bantamweight	Released	
February	11	(United States)	Brandon Davis	Featherweight	Released	
February	11	(Peru)	Carlos Huachin	Bantamweight	Released	
February	11	(United States)	Daniel Spitz	Heavyweight	Released	
February	11	(Serbia)	Darko Stošić	Light Heavyweight	Released	
February	11	(Russia)	Grigory Popov	Bantamweight	Released	
February	11	(Mexico)	Hector Aldana	Welterweight	Released	
February	11	(Brazil)	Kalindra Faria	Women's Flyweight	Released	
February	11	(Czech Republic)	Lucie Pudilová	Women's Bantamweight	Released	
February	11	(New Zealand)	Luke Jumeau	Welterweight	Released	
February	11	(Mexico)	Martin Bravo	Featherweight	Released	
February	11	(United States)	Nathan Coy	Welterweight	Released	
February	11	(Mexico)	Polo Reyes	Featherweight	Released	
February	11	(Poland)	Salim Touahri	Welterweight	Released	
February	12	(United States)	Juan Adams	Heavyweight	Released	
February	13	(Brazil)	Júnior Albini	Heavyweight	Released	
February	25	(Sweden)	Daniel Teymur	Featherweight	Released	
March	6	(Canada)	Chad Laprise	Welterweight	Released	
March	19	(France)	Cyril Asker	Heavyweight	Released	
March	19	(South Korea)	Dong Hyun Ma	Lightweight	Released	
March	19	(Brazil)	Isabella de Pádua	Women's Flyweight	Released	
March	19	(Austria)	Ismail Naurdiev	Welterweight	Chose not to re-sign	
March	19	(United States)	Jodie Esquibel	Women's Strawweight	Released	
March	19	(Russia)	Khalid Murtazaliev	Middleweight	Released	
March	19	(Canada)	Kyle Prepolec	Lightweight	Released	
March	19	(Brazil)	Marcos Rosa Mariano	Lightweight	Released	
March	19	(United States)	Matthew Lopez	Bantamweight	Released	
March	19	(Brazil)	Talita Bernardo	Women's Bantamweight	Released	
March	19	(Finland)	Teemu Packalén	Lightweight	Chose not to re-sign	
March	19	(United States)	Tonya Evinger	Women's Bantamweight	Released	
March	29	(United States)	Trevor Smith	Middleweight	Released	
May	10	(United States)	Henry Cejudo	Bantamweight	Retired	
June	7	(United States)	Charles Byrd	Middleweight	Retired	
June	19	(Afghanistan)	Siyar Bahadurzada	Welterweight	Retired	
June	27	(Poland)	Oskar Piechota	Middleweight	Released	
July	1	(United States)	John Gunther	Middleweight	Released	
July	26	(Brazil)	Fabrício Werdum	Heavyweight	Chose not resign	
July	26	(Germany)	Peter Sobotta	Welterweight	Retired	
July	28	(Brazil)	Antônio Rogério Nogueira	Light Heavyweight	Retired	
August	7	(United States)	Corey Anderson	Light Heavyweight	Signed with Bellator MMA	
August	7	(United States)	Ray Borg	Bantamweight	Released	
August	9	(Russia)	Roman Bogatov	Lightweight	Released	
August	12	(United States)	Paige VanZant	Women's Flyweight	Signed with BKFC	
August	13	(United States)	Evan Dunham	Featherweight	Released	
August	13	(United States)	Max Rohskopf	Lightweight	Released	
August	16	(United States)	Daniel Cormier	Heavyweight	Retired	
August	20	(Australia)	Callan Potter	Lightweight	Released	
August	20	(Brazil)	Klidson Abreu	Light Heavyweight	Released	
August	20	(England)	Nad Narimani	Featherweight	Released	
September	2	(United States)	Ricardo Lamas	Featherweight	Retired	
September	3	(United States)	Todd Duffee	Heavyweight	Released	
September	11	(United States)	Austin Springer	Featherweight	Released	
September	18	(United States)	John Dodson	Bantamweight	Released	
September	21	(Brazil)	Duda Santana	Women's Bantamweight	Released	
September	21	(Scotland)	Stevie Ray	Lightweight	Retired	
October	2	(Brazil)	Iuri Alcântara	Bantamweight	Released	
October	2	(United States)	Jeff Hughes	Heavyweight	Released	
October	2	(Russia)	Khadis Ibragimov	Light Heavyweight	Released	
October	2	(Italy)	Mara Romero Borella	Women's Flyweight	Released	
October	7	(Australia)	Ben Sosoli	Heavyweight	Released	
October	7	(Australia)	Nadia Kassem	Women's Strawweight	Released	
October	7	(United States)	Dequan Townsend	Light Heavyweight	Released	
October	7	(Wales)	Brett Johns	Bantamweight	Signed with Bellator MMA	
October	15	(United States)	James Vick	Welterweight	Released	
October	19	(Russia)	Zelim Imadaev	Welterweight	Released	
October	24	(Russia)	Khabib Nurmagomedov	Lightweight	Retired	
October	29	(Peru)	Enrique Barzola	Bantamweight	End of contract	
November	13	(Wales)	John Phillips	Middleweight	Released	
November	13	(United States)	Justin Ledet	Light Heavyweight	Released	
November	13	(United States)	Bevon Lewis	Middleweight	Released	
November	16	(Brazil)	Jussier Formiga	Flyweight	Released	
November	20	(Brazil)	Anderson Silva	Middleweight	Released	
December	4	(Canada)	Cole Smith	Bantamweight	Released	
December	7	(United States)	Rachael Ostovich	Women's Flyweight	Released	
December	8	(Russia)	Gadzhimurad Antigulov	Light Heavyweight	Released	
December	8	(United States)	Matt Wiman	Lightweight	Released	
December	8	(Russia)	Saparbek Safarov	Middleweight	Released	
December	23	(United States)	Anthony Pettis	Welterweight	Signed with PFL	
December	23	(United States)	Erik Koch	Welterweight	Released	
December	23	(Tunisia)	Jessin Ayari	Lightweight	Released	
December	24	(United States)	Mark De La Rosa	Bantamweight	Released	
December	24	(Cuba)	Yoel Romero	Middleweight	Released	

== Debut UFC fighters ==
The following fighters fought their first UFC fight in 2020:

Month	Day	ISO	Fighter	Division	Event
January	18	(United States)	Aleksa Camur	Light Heavyweight	UFC 246
January	18	(United States)	Ode' Osbourne	Bantamweight	UFC 246
January	25	(Brazil)	Herbert Burns	Featherweight	UFC Fight Night 166
January	25	(United States)	Jamahal Hill	Light Heavyweight	UFC Fight Night 166
January	25	(United States)	Nate Landwehr	Featherweight	UFC Fight Night 166
January	25	(United States)	Tony Gravely	Bantamweight	UFC Fight Night 166
February	8	(United States)	Austin Lingo	Featherweight	UFC 247
February	8	(United States)	Khaos Williams	Welterweight	UFC 247
February	8	(Morocco)	Youssef Zalal	Featherweight	UFC 247
February	15	(United States)	Brok Weaver	Lightweight	UFC Fight Night 167
February	15	(United States)	Daniel Rodriguez	Welterweight	UFC Fight Night 167
February	15	(United States)	Shanna Young	Women's Bantamweight	UFC Fight Night 167
February	23	(Australia)	Joshua Culibao	Featherweight	UFC Fight Night 168
February	29	(United States)	Aalon Cruz	Featherweight	UFC Fight Night 169
February	29	(United States)	Darrick Minner	Featherweight	UFC Fight Night 169
February	29	(United States)	Kyler Phillips	Bantamweight	UFC Fight Night 169
February	29	(Brazil)	Norma Dumont	Women's Featherweight	UFC Fight Night 169
February	29	(United States)	Spike Carlyle	Featherweight	UFC Fight Night 169
February	29	(United States)	Steve Garcia	Lightweight	UFC Fight Night 169
February	29	(United States)	T.J. Brown	Featherweight	UFC Fight Night 169
March	7	(United States)	Jamall Emmers	Featherweight	UFC 248
March	14	(Czech Republic)	David Dvořák	Flyweight	UFC Fight Night 170
May	13	(United States)	Isaac Villanueva	Light Heavyweight	UFC Fight Night 171
May	13	(Brazil)	Philipe Lins	Heavyweight	UFC Fight Night 171
May	16	(United States)	Irwin Rivera	Bantamweight	UFC on ESPN 8
May	16	(Brazil)	Rodrigo Nascimento	Heavyweight	UFC on ESPN 8
May	30	(United States)	Brandon Royval	Flyweight	UFC on ESPN 9
June	13	(United States)	Anthony Ivy	Welterweight	UFC on ESPN 10
June	13	(United States)	Christian Aguilera	Welterweight	UFC on ESPN 10
June	13	(United States)	Gabriel Green	Welterweight	UFC on ESPN 10
June	13	(United States)	Gustavo Lopez	Bantamweight	UFC on ESPN 10
June	13	(Kazakhstan)	Mariya Agapova	Women's Flyweight	UFC on ESPN 10
June	13	(Uzbekistan)	Zarrukh Adashev	Flyweight	UFC on ESPN 10
June	20	(United States)	Justin Jaynes	Lightweight	UFC on ESPN 11
June	20	(United States)	Max Rohskopf	Lightweight	UFC on ESPN 11
June	27	(United States)	Jason Witt	Welterweight	UFC on ESPN 12
June	27	(United States)	Jinh Yu Frey	Women's Strawweight	UFC on ESPN 12
June	27	(United States)	Kay Hansen	Women's Strawweight	UFC on ESPN 12
June	27	(United States)	Kyle Daukaus	Middleweight	UFC on ESPN 12
July	12	(Czech Republic)	Jiří Procházka	Light Heavyweight	UFC 251
July	12	(Russia)	Maxim Grishin	Light Heavyweight	UFC 251
July	12	(Kazakhstan)	Roman Bogatov	Lightweight	UFC 251
July	12	(Kazakhstan)	Zhalgas Zhumagulov	Flyweight	UFC 251
July	16	(Greece)	Andreas Michailidis	Middleweight	UFC on ESPN 13
July	16	(United Arab Emirates)	Khamzat Chimaev	Welterweight	UFC on ESPN 13
July	16	(Lithuania)	Modestas Bukauskas	Light Heavyweight	UFC on ESPN 13
July	16	(Tunisia)	Mounir Lazzez	Welterweight	UFC on ESPN 13
July	19	(Iraq)	Amir Albazi	Flyweight	UFC Fight Night 172
July	19	(Brazil)	Carlos Felipe	Heavyweight	UFC Fight Night 172
July	19	(Canada)	Malcolm Gordon	Flyweight	UFC Fight Night 172
July	19	(Georgia (country))	Roman Dolidze	Middleweight	UFC Fight Night 172
July	26	(England)	Jai Herbert	Lightweight	UFC on ESPN 14
July	26	(United States)	John Castañeda	Bantamweight	UFC on ESPN 14
July	26	(Germany)	Niklas Stolze	Welterweight	UFC on ESPN 14
July	26	(Republic of Ireland)	Rhys McKee	Welterweight	UFC on ESPN 14
July	26	(England)	Tom Aspinall	Heavyweight	UFC on ESPN 14
August	1	(United States)	Cody Durden	Flyweight	UFC Fight Night 173
August	1	(United States)	Nate Maness	Bantamweight	UFC Fight Night 173
August	1	(United States)	Vincent Cachero	Bantamweight	UFC Fight Night 173
August	1	(United States)	Carlton Minus	Lightweight	UFC Fight Night 173
August	1	(United States)	Jordan Wright	Middleweight	UFC Fight Night 173
August	8	(United States)	Alexander Muñoz	Lightweight	UFC Fight Night 174
August	8	(Jordan)	Ali Alqaisi	Bantamweight	UFC Fight Night 174
August	8	(United States)	Joaquin Buckley	Middleweight	UFC Fight Night 174
August	8	(United States)	Johnny Muñoz Jr.	Bantamweight	UFC Fight Night 174
August	8	(United States)	Peter Barrett	Featherweight	UFC Fight Night 174
August	15	(United States)	Chris Daukaus	Heavyweight	UFC 252
August	15	(United States)	Danny Chavez	Featherweight	UFC 252
August	15	(United States)	Kai Kamaka III	Featherweight	UFC 252
August	15	(United States)	Parker Porter	Heavyweight	UFC 252
August	15	(United States)	Tony Kelley	Featherweight	UFC 252
August	22	(United States)	Matthew Semelsberger	Welterweight	UFC on ESPN 15
August	22	(Russia)	Timur Valiev	Bantamweight	UFC on ESPN 15
August	22	(United States)	Trevin Jones	Bantamweight	UFC on ESPN 15
August	29	(United States)	Austin Springer	Featherweight	UFC Fight Night 175
August	29	(United States)	Bill Algeo	Featherweight	UFC Fight Night 175
August	29	(United States)	Impa Kasanganay	Middleweight	UFC Fight Night 175
September	5	(United States)	Ray Rodriguez	Bantamweight	UFC Fight Night 176
September	12	(Moldova)	Alexander Romanov	Heavyweight	UFC Fight Night 177
September	12	(United States)	Kevin Croom	Featherweight	UFC Fight Night 177
September	12	(Guam)	Roque Martinez	Heavyweight	UFC Fight Night 177
September	19	(United States)	Jerome Rivera	Flyweight	UFC Fight Night 178
September	19	(United States)	Sarah Alpar	Women's Bantamweight	UFC Fight Night 178
September	19	(Canada)	T.J. Laramie	Featherweight	UFC Fight Night 178
September	27	(Brazil)	Danilo Marques	Light Heavyweight	UFC 253
September	27	(Slovakia)	Ľudovít Klein	Lightweight	UFC 253
September	27	(United States)	William Knight	Light Heavyweight	UFC 253
October	4	(England)	Cameron Else	Bantamweight	UFC on ESPN 16
October	4	(Serbia)	Duško Todorović	Middleweight	UFC on ESPN 16
October	4	(United States)	Jordan Williams	Middleweight	UFC on ESPN 16
October	4	(France)	Nassourdine Imavov	Middleweight	UFC on ESPN 16
October	11	(France)	Alan Baudot	Heavyweight	UFC Fight Night 179
October	11	(South Africa)	Dricus du Plessis	Middleweight	UFC Fight Night 179
October	11	(Georgia (country))	Ilia Topuria	Featherweight	UFC Fight Night 179
October	11	(Canada)	KB Bhullar	Middleweight	UFC Fight Night 179
October	11	(Switzerland)	Stephanie Egger	Women's Bantamweight	UFC Fight Night 179
October	11	(Russia)	Tagir Ulanbekov	Flyweight	UFC Fight Night 179
October	18	(Philippines)	Mark Striegl	Bantamweight	UFC Fight Night 180
October	18	(Poland)	Mateusz Gamrot	Lightweight	UFC Fight Night 180
October	18	(Georgia (country))	Guram Kutateladze	Lightweight	UFC Fight Night 180
October	25	(Australia)	Jacob Malkoun	Middleweight	UFC 254
October	25	(Uzbekistan)	Liliya Shakirova	Women’s Flyweight	UFC 254
October	25	(United States)	Miranda Maverick	Women's Flyweight	UFC 254
October	25	(United States)	Phil Hawes	Middleweight	UFC 254
October	25	(Kazakhstan)	Shavkat Rakhmonov	Welterweight	UFC 254
October	31	(United States)	Adrian Yañez	Bantamweight	UFC Fight Night 181
October	31	(United States)	Charlie Ontiveros	Lightweight	UFC Fight Night 181
October	31	(United States)	Kevin Natividad	Bantamweight	UFC Fight Night 181
October	31	(United States)	Victor Rodriguez	Bantamweight	UFC Fight Night 181
November	14	(United States)	Jamey Simmons	Featherweight	UFC Fight Night 182
November	14	(Japan)	Kanako Murata	Women's Strawweight	UFC Fight Night 182
November	14	(United States)	Ramiz Brahimaj	Welterweight	UFC Fight Night 182
November	21	(United States)	Dustin Stoltzfus	Middleweight	UFC 255
November	21	(United States)	Jared Gooden	Welterweight	UFC 255
November	21	(United States)	Louis Cosce	Welterweight	UFC 255
November	21	(Hong Kong)	Sasha Palatnikov	Welterweight	UFC 255
November	28	(United States)	Josh Parisian	Heavyweight	UFC on ESPN 18
December	5	(United States)	Jordan Leavitt	Lightweight	UFC on ESPN 19
December	12	(United States)	Sam Hughes	Women's Strawweight	UFC 256
December	19	(United States)	Cory McKenna	Women's Strawweight	UFC Fight Night 183
December	19	(United States)	Jamie Pickett	Middleweight	UFC Fight Night 183
December	19	(United States)	Jimmy Flick	Flyweight	UFC Fight Night 183
December	19	(Cameroon)	Tafon Nchukwi	Middleweight	UFC Fight Night 183

== Suspended fighters ==
The list below is based on fighters suspended either by (1) United States Anti-Doping Agency (USADA) or World Anti-Doping Agency (WADA) for violation of taking prohibited substances or non-analytical incidents, (2) by local commissions on misconduct during the fights or at event venues, or (3) by the UFC for reasons also stated below.

ISO	Name	Nickname	Division	From	Duration	Tested positive for / Info	By	Eligible to fight again	Ref.	Notes
Brazil	Fabrício Werdum	Vai Cavalo	Heavyweight	Apr 25, 2018	2 years	Trenbolone, an anabolic steroid.	USADA	Apr 1, 2020		Reduced suspension as a result of 'substantial assistance'
United States	T.J. Dillashaw		Bantamweight	Jan 18, 2019	1 year (NYSAC); 2 years (USADA)	Erythropoietin (EPO).	NYSAC and USADA	Jan 18, 2021		
Brazil	Michel Prazeres		Welterweight	Mar 9, 2019	2 years	Exogenous boldenone and its metabolite 5β-androst-1-en-17β-ol-3-one.	USADA	Mar 9, 2021		
(China)	Hu Yaozong	Totoro	Light Heavyweight	Mar 9, 2019	Initially 1 year but reduced to 10 months	Arimistane and its metabolite from contamination supplement.	USADA	Jan 9, 2020		
Georgia	Roman Dolidze	Bazooka	Light Heavyweight	Mar 12, 2019	1 year	Clomiphene hormone and its metabolites M1 and M2, as well as 4-chloro-18-nor-17β-hydroxymethyl,17α-methyl-5α-androst-13-en-3α-ol (M3), which is a long-term metabolite of dehydrochlormethyltestosterone (DHCMT).	USADA	March 12, 2020		
United States	Jessica Penne		Women's Flyweight	Apr 8, 2019	Initially 4 years but reduced to 20 months	Stanozolol metabolites 16β-hydroxystanozolol and 3′-hydroxystanozolol.	USADA	Dec 8, 2020		Original suspension was 4 years after second violation, but reduced to 20 months in February 2020
Brazil	Melissa Gatto		Women's Bantamweight	Jun 5, 2019	1 year	Furosemide, a diuretic.	USADA	Jun 5, 2020		
Brazil	Bruno Silva	Blindado	Middleweight	Jun 14, 2019	2 years	Boldenone and its metabolite.	USADA	Jun 14, 2021		
United States	Vince Murdock		Featherweight	Jul 6, 2019	20 months	GW1516, a hormone modulator that is better known as cardarine. It is often sold on the black market as endurobol.	USADA	Sep 6, 2020		Originally banned for 20 months and reduced to 14 months after documenting neurological condition moyamoya
Brazil	Giacomo Lemos		Heavyweight	Jul 9, 2019	2 years	Drostanolone and its metabolite 2α-methyl-5α-androstan-3α-ol-17-one.	USADA	Jul 9, 2021		
Brazil	John Allan		Light Heavyweight	Jul 13, 2019	1 year	Tamoxifen.	USADA and CSAC	Jul 13, 2020		Fined $4,800 by the CSAC
Brazil	Istela Nunes		Women's Strawweight	Jul 22, 2019	2 years	Stanozolol metabolites 16β-hydroxystanozolol and 3′-hydroxystanozolol.	USADA	Jul 22, 2021		
United States	Sean O'Malley		Bantamweight	Aug 6, 2019	6 months	Ostarine.	USADA	Feb 6, 2020		
Germany	Khalid Taha	The Warrior	Bantamweight	Oct 6, 2019	1 year	Furosemide (diuretics).	USADA	Oct 6, 2020		
Brazil	Priscila Cachoeira		Women's Flyweight	Oct 12, 2019	4 months	Hydrochlorothiazide (HCTZ) and its metabolites chlorothiazide and 4amino-6chloro-1,3-benzenedisulfonamide (ACB).	USADA	Feb 12, 2020		
United States	Ovince Saint Preux	OSP	Light Heavyweight	Oct 25, 2019	3 months	Ostarine and S-23, the family of selective androgen receptor modulators (SARMs).	USADA	Jan 25, 2020		Ostarine came from a tainted supplement
United States	Diego Sanchez	Nightmare	Welterweight	Oct 26, 2019	3 months	Ostarine and S-23, the family of selective androgen receptor modulators (SARMs).	USADA	Jan 26, 2020		Ostarine came from a tainted supplement
United States	Kelvin Gastelum		Middleweight	Nov 3, 2019	Initially 9 months but reduced to 5 months	Marijuana.	USADA	Apr 3, 2020		Original suspension was 9 months, but reduced to 5 months after Gastelum's successful completion of a drug treatment program
Brazil	Isabella de Pádua	Belinha	Women's Flyweight	Nov 16, 2019	2 years	19-Norandrosterone (19-NA), the main urinary metabolite of nandrolone (19-nortestosterone) and other 19-norsteroids (class of anabolic agent).	USADA and CABMMA	Nov 16, 2021		Released
United States	Rachael Ostovich		Women's Flyweight	Jan 3, 2020	8 months	Ostarine and GW1516.	USADA	Sep 9, 2020		Prohibited substance found in supplement
Brazil	Duda Santana	Cowboyzinha	Women's Bantamweight	Jan 10, 2020	1 year	Selective androgen receptor modulator LGD-4033	USADA	Jan 10, 2021		Released by UFC
Brazil	Lara Procópio		Women's Bantamweight	Feb 17, 2020	6 months	Ostarine	USADA	Aug 17, 2020		
Brazil	Raphael Pessoa	Bebezão	Heavyweight	Mar 4, 2020	1 year	hydrochlorothiazide and its metabolites chlorothiazide and 4-amino-6-chloro-1,3-benzenedisulfonamide	USADA	Mar 4, 2021		
United States	Deron Winn		Middleweight	Mar 7, 2020	9 months	Amphetamines.	NSAC	Dec 7, 2020		Fined $1,800
United States	Chase Sherman	The Vanilla Gorilla	Heavyweight	May 13, 2020	9 months	Anastrozole	USADA	Feb 13, 2021		
United States	Jamahal Hill	Sweet Dreams	Light Heavyweight	May 30, 2020	6 months	Marijuana.	NSAC	Nov 30, 2020		Fined 15% of his fight purse
Ukraine	Aleksander Doskalchuk		Flyweight	Jun 6, 2020	14 months	Mesterolone.	USADA	Aug 6, 2021		
United States	Luis Peña	Violent Bob Ross	Lightweight	Jun 17, 2020	4 1/2 months	Marijuana.	NSAC	Nov 2, 2020		Reduced suspension was due to his fight being taken on short notice, fined 15% of his fight purse
United States	Tim Elliott		Flyweight	Jun 17, 2020	4 1/2 months	Marijuana.	NSAC	Nov 2, 2020		Reduced suspension was due to his fight being taken on short notice, fined 15% of his fight purse
Canada	Marc-Andre Barriault	Power Bar	Middleweight	Jul 21, 2020	6 months	Ostarine	USADA	Jan 21, 2021		
Canada	Jesse Ronson	The Body Snatcher	Welterweight	Jul 22, 2020	20 months	Metandienone	USADA	Mar 22, 2022		
Mexico	Jorge Gonzalez	George St.	Light Heavyweight	Aug 5, 2020	2 years	Stanozolol metabolites, drostanolone metabolite and tamoxifen metabolite.	USADA	Aug 5, 2022		
Mexico	Yair Rodríguez	El Pantera	Featherweight	Sep 8, 2020	6 months	3 Whereabouts Failures in Last Year	USADA	Mar 8, 2021		
United States	Kevin Croom	The Hard Hitting Hillbilly	Lightweight	Sep 19, 2020	4 1/2 months	Marijuana.	NSAC	Jan 26, 2021		With addition of $1,800 fine
United States	Niko Price	The Hybrid	Welterweight	Sep 19, 2020	6 months	Marijuana	NSAC	Mar 19, 2021		With addition of $8,500 fine
Poland	Oskar Piechota	Imadło	Middleweight	Sep 25, 2020	22 months	Growth hormone releasing peptide 2 (GHRP-2 or pralmorelin) and GHRP-2 (1-3) free acid, a metabolite of GHRP-2,	USADA	Jul 25, 2022		
United States	Erik Koch	The Phoenix	Welterweight	Oct 3, 2020	18 months	3′-hydroxy-stanozolol, a metabolite of stanozolol	USADA	Apr 3, 2022		
United States	Charlie Ontiveros	The American Badboy	Welterweight	Oct 30, 2020	6 months	Chlorodehydromethyltestosterone metabolites	NSAC	Apr 30, 2021		With addition of $2,245.36
United States	Raquel Pennington	Rocky	Women's Bantamweight	Nov 7, 2020	6 months	7-Keto-DHEA and AOD-9064	USADA	May 7, 2021		Self-reporting doping violation when she found out she had ingested banned substances prescribed by her doctor to help treat a medical condition
Uzbekistan	Liliya Shakirova		Women's Flyweight	Dec 5, 2020	2 years	Meldonium	USADA	Dec 5, 2022		

== Title fights ==
Title fights in 2020
Weight class				Method	Round	Time	Event	Notes
Women's Flyweight	Valentina Shevchenko (c)	def.	Katlyn Chookagian	TKO (elbows and punches)	3	1:03	UFC 247	(Note: For the UFC Women's Flyweight Championship.)
Light Heavyweight	Jon Jones (c)	def.	Dominick Reyes	Decision (unanimous) (48–47, 48–47, 49–46)	5	5:00	UFC 247	(Note: For the UFC Light Heavyweight Championship.)
Flyweight	Deiveson Figueiredo	def.	Joseph Benavidez	TKO (punches)	2	1:54	UFC Fight Night 169	(Note: For the vacant UFC Flyweight Championship. Figueiredo missed weight (127.5 lbs) and became ineligible to win the title.)
Women's Strawweight	Zhang Weili (c)	def.	Joanna Jędrzejczyk	Decision (split) (48–47, 47–48, 48–47)	5	5:00	UFC 248	(Note: For the UFC Women's Strawweight Championship.)
Middleweight	Israel Adesanya (c)	def.	Yoel Romero	Decision (unanimous) (48–47, 48–47, 49–46)	5	5:00	UFC 248	(Note: For the UFC Middleweight Championship.)
Bantamweight	Henry Cejudo (c)	def.	Dominick Cruz	TKO (knee and punches)	2	4:58	UFC 249	(Note: For the UFC Bantamweight Championship.)
Lightweight	Justin Gaethje	def.	Tony Ferguson	TKO (punches)	5	3:39	UFC 249	(Note: For the interim UFC Lightweight Championship.)
Women's Featherweight	Amanda Nunes (c)	def.	Felicia Spencer	Decision (unanimous) (50–44, 50–44, 50–45)	5	5:00	UFC 250	(Note: For the UFC Women's Featherweight Championship.)
Bantamweight	Petr Yan	def.	José Aldo	TKO (punches)	5	3:24	UFC 251	(Note: For the vacant UFC Bantamweight Championship.)
Featherweight	Alexander Volkanovski (c)	def.	Max Holloway	Decision (split) (47–48, 48–47, 48–47)	5	5:00	UFC 251	(Note: For the UFC Featherweight Championship.)
Welterweight	Kamaru Usman (c)	def.	Jorge Masvidal	Decision (unanimous) (50–45, 50–45, 49–46)	5	5:00	UFC 251	(Note: For the UFC Welterweight Championship.)
Flyweight	Deiveson Figueiredo	def.	Joseph Benavidez	Technical Submission (rear-naked choke)	1	4:48	UFC Fight Night 172	(Note: For the vacant UFC Flyweight Championship.)
Heavyweight	Stipe Miocic (c)	def.	Daniel Cormier	Decision (unanimous) (49–46, 49–46, 48–47)	5	5:00	UFC 252	(Note: For the UFC Heavyweight Championship.)
Light Heavyweight	Jan Błachowicz	def.	Dominick Reyes	TKO (punches)	2	4:36	UFC 253	(Note: For the vacant UFC Light Heavyweight Championship.)
Middleweight	Israel Adesanya (c)	def.	Paulo Costa	TKO (punches)	2	3:59	UFC 253	(Note: For the UFC Middleweight Championship.)
Lightweight	Khabib Nurmagomedov (c)	def.	Justin Gaethje (ic)	Technical Submission (triangle choke)	2	1:34	UFC 254	(Note: For the UFC Lightweight Championship.)
Women's Flyweight	Valentina Shevchenko (c)	def.	Jennifer Maia	Decision (unanimous) (49–46, 49–46, 49–46)	5	5:00	UFC 255	(Note: For the UFC Women's Flyweight Championship.)
Flyweight	Deiveson Figueiredo (c)	def.	Alex Perez	Submission (guillotine choke)	1	1:57	UFC 255	(Note: For the UFC Flyweight Championship.)
Flyweight	Deiveson Figueiredo (c)	vs.	Brandon Moreno	Draw (majority) (48–46, 47–47, 47–47)	5	5:00	UFC 256	(Note: For the UFC Flyweight Championship.)

== Events list ==
#	Event	Date	Venue	City	Country	Atten.	Ref.	Fight of the Night			Performance of the Night		Bonus	Ref.
546	UFC Fight Night: Thompson vs. Neal	Dec 19, 2020	UFC Apex	Las Vegas	United States	0		—N/a			Stephen Thompson	Rob Font	$50,000	
546	UFC Fight Night: Thompson vs. Neal	Dec 19, 2020	UFC Apex	Las Vegas	United States	0		—N/a			Marcin Tybura	Jimmy Flick	$50,000	
545	UFC 256: Figueiredo vs. Moreno	Dec 12, 2020	UFC Apex	Las Vegas	United States	0		Deiveson Figueiredo	vs.	Brandon Moreno	Kevin Holland	Rafael Fiziev	$50,000	
544	UFC on ESPN: Hermansson vs. Vettori	Dec 6, 2020	UFC Apex	Las Vegas	United States	0		Marvin Vettori	vs.	Jack Hermansson	Jordan Leavitt	Gabriel Benítez	$50,000	
543	UFC on ESPN: Smith vs. Clark	Nov 28, 2020	UFC Apex	Las Vegas	United States	0		—N/a			Anthony Smith	Miguel Baeza	$50,000	
543	UFC on ESPN: Smith vs. Clark	Nov 28, 2020	UFC Apex	Las Vegas	United States	0		—N/a			Su Mudaerji	Nate Maness	$50,000	
542	UFC 255: Figueiredo vs. Perez	Nov 21, 2020	UFC Apex	Las Vegas	United States	0		Louis Cosce	vs.	Sasha Palatnikov	Joaquin Buckley	Antonina Shevchenko	$50,000	
541	UFC Fight Night: Felder vs. dos Anjos	Nov 14, 2020	UFC Apex	Las Vegas	United States	0		Rafael dos Anjos	vs.	Paul Felder	Sean Strickland	Khaos Williams	$50,000	
540	UFC on ESPN: Santos vs. Teixeira	Nov 7, 2020	UFC Apex	Las Vegas	United States	0		Raoni Barcelos	vs.	Khalid Taha	Giga Chikadze	Alexander Romanov	$50,000	
539	UFC Fight Night: Hall vs. Silva	Oct 31, 2020	UFC Apex	Las Vegas	United States	0		—N/a			Kevin Holland	Alexander Hernandez	$50,000	
539	UFC Fight Night: Hall vs. Silva	Oct 31, 2020	UFC Apex	Las Vegas	United States	0		—N/a			Adrian Yanez	Miles Johns	$50,000	
538	UFC 254: Khabib vs. Gaethje	Oct 24, 2020	Flash Forum	Abu Dhabi	United Arab Emirates	0		Casey Kenney	vs.	Nathaniel Wood	Khabib Nurmagomedov	Magomed Ankalaev	$50,000	
537	UFC Fight Night: Ortega vs. The Korean Zombie	Oct 18, 2020	Flash Forum	Abu Dhabi	United Arab Emirates	0		Guram Kutateladze	vs.	Mateusz Gamrot	Jéssica Andrade	Jimmy Crute	$50,000	
536	UFC Fight Night: Moraes vs. Sandhagen	Oct 11, 2020	Flash Forum	Abu Dhabi	United Arab Emirates	0		—N/a			Cory Sandhagen	Joaquin Buckley	$50,000	
536	UFC Fight Night: Moraes vs. Sandhagen	Oct 11, 2020	Flash Forum	Abu Dhabi	United Arab Emirates	0		—N/a			Chris Daukaus	Tom Breese	$50,000	
535	UFC on ESPN: Holm vs. Aldana	Oct 4, 2020	Flash Forum	Abu Dhabi	United Arab Emirates	0		—N/a			Germaine de Randamie	Duško Todorović	$50,000	
535	UFC on ESPN: Holm vs. Aldana	Oct 4, 2020	Flash Forum	Abu Dhabi	United Arab Emirates	0		—N/a			Kyler Phillips	Luigi Vendramini	$50,000	
534	UFC 253: Adesanya vs. Costa	Sep 27, 2020	Flash Forum	Abu Dhabi	United Arab Emirates	0		Brandon Royval	vs.	Kai Kara-France	Israel Adesanya	Jan Błachowicz	$50,000	
533	UFC Fight Night: Covington vs. Woodley	Sep 19, 2020	UFC Apex	Las Vegas	United States	0		—N/a			Khamzat Chimaev	Mackenzie Dern	$50,000	
533	UFC Fight Night: Covington vs. Woodley	Sep 19, 2020	UFC Apex	Las Vegas	United States	0		—N/a			Damon Jackson	Randy Costa	$50,000	
532	UFC Fight Night: Waterson vs. Hill	Sep 12, 2020	UFC Apex	Las Vegas	United States	0		Michelle Waterson	vs.	Angela Hill	Ottman Azaitar	Kevin Croom	$50,000	
531	UFC Fight Night: Overeem vs. Sakai	Sep 5, 2020	UFC Apex	Las Vegas	United States	0		—N/a			Ovince Saint Preux	Michel Pereira	$50,000	
531	UFC Fight Night: Overeem vs. Sakai	Sep 5, 2020	UFC Apex	Las Vegas	United States	0		—N/a			André Muniz	Brian Kelleher	$50,000	
530	UFC Fight Night: Smith vs. Rakić	Aug 29, 2020	UFC Apex	Las Vegas	United States	0		Ricardo Lamas	vs.	Bill Algeo	Sean Brady	Mallory Martin	$50,000	
529	UFC on ESPN: Munhoz vs. Edgar	Aug 22, 2020	UFC Apex	Las Vegas	United States	0		Frankie Edgar	vs.	Pedro Munhoz	Shana Dobson	Trevin Jones	$50,000	
528	UFC 252: Miocic vs. Cormier 3	Aug 15, 2020	UFC Apex	Las Vegas	United States	0		Kai Kamaka III	vs.	Tony Kelley	Daniel Pineda	Virna Jandiroba	$50,000	
527	UFC Fight Night: Lewis vs. Oleinik	Aug 8, 2020	UFC Apex	Las Vegas	United States	0		—N/a			Darren Stewart	Kevin Holland	$50,000	
527	UFC Fight Night: Lewis vs. Oleinik	Aug 8, 2020	UFC Apex	Las Vegas	United States	0		—N/a			Andrew Sanchez	Gavin Tucker	$50,000	
526	UFC Fight Night: Brunson vs. Shahbazyan	Aug 1, 2020	UFC Apex	Las Vegas	United States	0		Bobby Green	vs.	Lando Vannata	Jennifer Maia	Vicente Luque	$50,000	
525	UFC on ESPN: Whittaker vs. Till	Jul 25, 2020	Flash Forum	Abu Dhabi	United Arab Emirates	0		—N/a			Fabrício Werdum	Paul Craig	$50,000	
525	UFC on ESPN: Whittaker vs. Till	Jul 25, 2020	Flash Forum	Abu Dhabi	United Arab Emirates	0		—N/a			Khamzat Chimaev	Jesse Ronson	$50,000	
525	UFC on ESPN: Whittaker vs. Till	Jul 25, 2020	Flash Forum	Abu Dhabi	United Arab Emirates	0		—N/a			Tom Aspinall	Tanner Boser	$50,000	
524	UFC Fight Night: Figueiredo vs. Benavidez 2	Jul 19, 2020	Flash Forum	Abu Dhabi	United Arab Emirates	0		Rafael Fiziev	vs.	Marc Diakiese	Deiveson Figueiredo	Ariane Lipski	$50,000	
523	UFC on ESPN: Kattar vs. Ige	Jul 16, 2020	Flash Forum	Abu Dhabi	United Arab Emirates	0		Mounir Lazzez	vs.	Abdul Razak Alhassan^{1}	Khamzat Chimaev	Lerone Murphy	$50,000	
523	UFC on ESPN: Kattar vs. Ige	Jul 16, 2020	Flash Forum	Abu Dhabi	United Arab Emirates	0		Mounir Lazzez	vs.	Abdul Razak Alhassan^{1}	Modestas Bukauskas		$50,000	
522	UFC 251: Usman vs. Masvidal	Jul 12, 2020	Flash Forum	Abu Dhabi	United Arab Emirates	0		Rose Namajunas	vs.	Jéssica Andrade	Jiří Procházka	Davey Grant	$50,000	
521	UFC on ESPN: Poirier vs. Hooker	Jun 27, 2020	UFC Apex	Las Vegas	United States	0		Dustin Poirier	vs.	Dan Hooker	Kay Hansen	Julian Erosa	$50,000	
520	UFC on ESPN: Blaydes vs. Volkov	Jun 20, 2020	UFC Apex	Las Vegas	United States	0		Josh Emmett	vs.	Shane Burgos	Jim Miller	Justin Jaynes	$50,000	
519	UFC on ESPN: Eye vs. Calvillo	Jun 13, 2020	UFC Apex	Las Vegas	United States	0		—N/a			Marvin Vettori	Mariya Agapova	$50,000	
519	UFC on ESPN: Eye vs. Calvillo	Jun 13, 2020	UFC Apex	Las Vegas	United States	0		—N/a			Tyson Nam	Christian Aguilera	$50,000	
518	UFC 250: Nunes vs. Spencer	Jun 6, 2020	UFC Apex	Las Vegas	United States	0		—N/a			Cody Garbrandt	Aljamain Sterling	$50,000	
518	UFC 250: Nunes vs. Spencer	Jun 6, 2020	UFC Apex	Las Vegas	United States	0		—N/a			Sean O'Malley	Alex Perez	$50,000	
517	UFC on ESPN: Woodley vs. Burns	May 30, 2020	UFC Apex	Las Vegas	United States	0		Brandon Royval	vs.	Tim Elliott	Gilbert Burns	Mackenzie Dern	$50,000	
516	UFC on ESPN: Overeem vs. Harris	May 16, 2020	VyStar Veterans Memorial Arena	Jacksonville	United States	0		Song Yadong	vs.	Marlon Vera	Miguel Baeza	Cortney Casey	$50,000	
515	UFC Fight Night: Smith vs. Teixeira	May 13, 2020	VyStar Veterans Memorial Arena	Jacksonville	United States	0		Brian Kelleher	vs.	Hunter Azure	Glover Teixeira	Drew Dober	$50,000	
514	UFC 249: Ferguson vs. Gaethje	May 9, 2020	VyStar Veterans Memorial Arena	Jacksonville	United States	0		Tony Ferguson	vs.	Justin Gaethje	Justin Gaethje	Francis Ngannou	$50,000	
–	UFC Fight Night: Hermansson vs. Weidman	May 2, 2020	Chesapeake Energy Arena	Oklahoma City	United States	Cancelled		—N/a						
–	UFC Fight Night: Smith vs. Teixeira	Apr 25, 2020	Pinnacle Bank Arena	Lincoln	United States	Cancelled		—N/a						
–	UFC Fight Night: Overeem vs. Harris	Apr 11, 2020	Moda Center	Portland	United States	Cancelled		—N/a						
–	UFC on ESPN: Ngannou vs. Rozenstruik	Mar 28, 2020	Nationwide Arena	Columbus	United States	Cancelled		—N/a						
–	UFC Fight Night: Woodley vs. Edwards	Mar 21, 2020	The O2 Arena	London	England	Cancelled		—N/a						
513	UFC Fight Night: Lee vs. Oliveira	Mar 14, 2020	Ginásio Nilson Nelson	Brasília	Brazil	0		Maryna Moroz	vs.	Mayra Bueno Silva	Charles Oliveira	Gilbert Burns	$50,000	
512	UFC 248: Adesanya vs. Romero	Mar 7, 2020	T-Mobile Arena	Las Vegas	United States	15,077		Zhang Weili	vs.	Joanna Jędrzejczyk	Beneil Dariush	Sean O'Malley	$50,000	
511	UFC Fight Night: Benavidez vs. Figueiredo	Feb 29, 2020	Chartway Arena	Norfolk	United States	7,098		Kyler Phillips	vs.	Gabriel Silva	Megan Anderson	Jordan Griffin	$50,000	
510	UFC Fight Night: Felder vs. Hooker	Feb 23, 2020	Spark Arena	Auckland	New Zealand	10,025		Dan Hooker	vs.	Paul Felder	Jimmy Crute	Priscila Cachoeira	$50,000	
509	UFC Fight Night: Anderson vs. Błachowicz 2	Feb 15, 2020	Santa Ana Star Center	Rio Rancho	United States	6,449		Scott Holtzman	vs.	Jim Miller	Jan Błachowicz	Daniel Rodriguez	$50,000	
508	UFC 247: Jones vs. Reyes	Feb 8, 2020	Toyota Center	Houston	United States	17,401		Trevin Giles	vs.	James Krause	Khaos Williams	Mario Bautista	$50,000	
507	UFC Fight Night: Blaydes vs. dos Santos	Jan 25, 2020	PNC Arena	Raleigh	United States	14,533		Brett Johns	vs.	Tony Gravely	Alex Perez	Herbert Burns	$50,000	
506	UFC 246: McGregor vs. Cowboy	Jan 18, 2020	T-Mobile Arena	Las Vegas	United States	19,040		—N/a			Conor McGregor		$50,000	
506	UFC 246: McGregor vs. Cowboy	Jan 18, 2020	T-Mobile Arena	Las Vegas	United States	19,040		—N/a			Aleksei Oleinik	Brian Kelleher	$50,000	
506	UFC 246: McGregor vs. Cowboy	Jan 18, 2020	T-Mobile Arena	Las Vegas	United States	19,040		—N/a			Drew Dober	Carlos Diego Ferreira	$50,000	

^{1}Abdul Razak Alhassan was disqualified for the Fight of the Night bonus due to missing weight, as a result a third Performance of the Night bonus was awarded.

== See also ==
- List of UFC champions
- List of UFC events
- List of current UFC fighters
