= UFC Fight Night: Thompson vs. Neal =

UFC mixed martial arts event in 2020

- The poster for UFC Fight Night: Thompson vs. Neal
- Promotion: Ultimate Fighting Championship
- Date: December 19, 2020
- Venue: UFC Apex
- City: Enterprise, Nevada, United States
- Attendance: None (behind closed doors)

Event chronology
UFC 256: Figueiredo vs. Moreno	UFC Fight Night: Thompson vs. Neal	UFC on ABC: Holloway vs. Kattar

UFC Fight Night: Thompson vs. Neal (also known as UFC Fight Night 183, UFC on ESPN+ 41 and UFC Vegas 17) was a mixed martial arts event produced by the Ultimate Fighting Championship that took place on December 19, 2020 at the UFC Apex facility in Enterprise, Nevada, part of the Las Vegas Metropolitan Area, United States.

== Background ==
A welterweight bout between Leon Edwards and Khamzat Chimaev was initially scheduled to headline this event. On November 29, it was announced that Chimaev had tested positive for COVID-19, but was expected to be able to compete. In turn, Edwards pulled out two days later after also testing positive. His case was worse than Chimaev's and he was still suffering from severe symptoms of the disease. The promotion was expected to keep the bout intact and reschedule the pairing for a future event in early 2021, but Chimaev's lingering symptoms prevented him from returning until UFC 267.

The original co-main event, a welterweight bout between former UFC Welterweight Championship challenger Stephen Thompson and Geoff Neal served as the event headliner.

A flyweight bout between Matt Schnell and Tyson Nam was expected to take place at the event. The pairing was previously scheduled to take place in September at UFC Fight Night: Waterson vs. Hill. However, the fight was canceled on the day of the event's weigh-in as Schnell was deemed medically unfit to compete due to complications related to his weight cut. The bout was subsequently rescheduled for UFC on ESPN 20.

A welterweight bout between Belal Muhammad and Sean Brady was expected to take place at this event. However in late October, Muhammad revealed that Brady had a broken nose and had to pull out of their bout. He was replaced by Dhiego Lima. Subsequently, Muhammad was diagnosed with COVID-19 during the week leading up to the event and the bout was scrapped. The pairing is expected to be left intact and rescheduled for a future event in early 2021.

Deron Winn and Antônio Braga Neto were expected to meet in a middleweight bout at the event. In turn, Braga Neto was removed from the contest due to undisclosed reasons and replaced by Antônio Arroyo, thus changing the contest to a catchweight of 195 pounds.

A flyweight bout between Alexandre Pantoja and former Rizin FF Bantamweight Champion Manel Kape was scheduled for the event. However, Pantoja pulled out of the fight in early December due to COVID-19 symptoms. Kape served as a potential replacement for the UFC Flyweight Championship bout between current champion Deiveson Figueiredo and Brandon Moreno a week earlier at UFC 256.

Misha Cirkunov was expected to face Ryan Spann in a light heavyweight bout at this event. However, Cirkunov pulled out in early December due to an injury and the bout was postponed to a future date.

A flyweight bout between Jimmy Flick and Cody Durden was initially scheduled for UFC on ESPN: Hermansson vs. Vettori two weeks earlier, but the pairing was canceled on the day of the event after Durden had conjunctivitis. The matchup was left intact and took place at this event.

Also rescheduled for this event was a middleweight bout between Karl Roberson and Dalcha Lungiambula. They were expected to meet at UFC 256, but Roberson tested positive for COVID-19 and the fight was postponed. A day before the event, they suffered a second cancellation due to Roberson's COVID-19 related issues.

A lightweight bout between former WSOF Featherweight Champion Ricky Glenn and Carlton Minus was scheduled for this event. However, it was announced that Glenn pulled out during fight week due to undisclosed reasons. He was replaced by Christos Giagos and the bout took place at a catchweight of 160 pounds.

Aiemann Zahabi was expected to face Drako Rodriguez in a bantamweight bout at this event. However, the bout was scrapped on December 17 due to Zahabi testing positive for COVID-19.

== Results ==
Main card (ESPN+)
Weight class				Method	Round	Time	Notes
Welterweight	Stephen Thompson	def.	Geoff Neal	Decision (unanimous) (50–45, 50–45, 50–45)	5	5:00
Bantamweight	José Aldo	def.	Marlon Vera	Decision (unanimous) (29–28, 29–28, 29–28)	3	5:00
Welterweight	Michel Pereira	def.	Khaos Williams	Decision (unanimous) (29–28, 29–28, 29–28)	3	5:00
Bantamweight	Rob Font	def.	Marlon Moraes	TKO (punches)	1	3:47
Heavyweight	Marcin Tybura	def.	Greg Hardy	TKO (punches)	2	4:31
Preliminary card (ESPN / ESPN+)
Welterweight	Anthony Pettis	def.	Alex Morono	Decision (unanimous) (29–28, 29–28, 29–28)	3	5:00
Women's Bantamweight	Pannie Kianzad	def.	Sijara Eubanks	Decision (unanimous) (29–28, 29–28, 29–28)	3	5:00
Catchweight (195 lb)	Deron Winn	def.	Antônio Arroyo	Decision (unanimous) (29–28, 29–28, 29–28)	3	5:00
Women’s Flyweight	Taila Santos	def.	Gillian Robertson	Decision (unanimous) (30–26, 30–26, 29–28)	3	5:00
Middleweight	Tafon Nchukwi	def.	Jamie Pickett	Decision (unanimous) (30–25, 30–26, 30–26)	3	5:00
Flyweight	Jimmy Flick	def.	Cody Durden	Submission (flying triangle choke)	1	3:18
Catchweight (160 lb)	Christos Giagos	def.	Carlton Minus	Decision (unanimous) (30–26, 29–27, 29–28)	3	5:00

== Bonus awards ==
The following fighters received $50,000 bonuses.

- Fight of the Night: No bonus awarded.
- Performance of the Night: Stephen Thompson, Rob Font, Marcin Tybura, and Jimmy Flick

== See also ==
- List of UFC events
- List of current UFC fighters
- 2020 in UFC
