= UFC Fight Night: Joanna vs. Waterson =

UFC mixed martial arts event in 2019

- The poster for UFC Fight Night: Joanna vs. Waterson
- Promotion: Ultimate Fighting Championship
- Date: October 12, 2019
- Venue: Amalie Arena
- City: Tampa, Florida
- Attendance: 10,597
- Total gate: $897,805

Event chronology
UFC 243: Whittaker vs. Adesanya	UFC Fight Night: Joanna vs. Waterson	UFC on ESPN: Reyes vs. Weidman

UFC Fight Night: Joanna vs. Waterson (also known as UFC Fight Night 161 or UFC on ESPN+ 19) was a mixed martial arts event produced by the Ultimate Fighting Championship that took place on October 12, 2019 at Amalie Arena in Tampa, Florida.

== Background ==
Officially announced by the organization, the event was initially linked to the newly constructed Chase Center in San Francisco, California, which would have marked the promotion's first visit to the city. It would have also been the first trip to the Bay Area since UFC 117 in 2010. However, the plans for a San Francisco debut fizzled and the promotion confirmed that the event would instead take place in Tampa, Florida. The event marked the promotion's third visit to Tampa and its second visit to Amalie Arena, following UFC on Fox: Teixeira vs. Evans in April of 2016.

A women's strawweight bout between former UFC Women's Strawweight Champion Joanna Jędrzejczyk and former Invicta FC Atomweight Champion Michelle Waterson served as the event headliner.

A middleweight bout between The Ultimate Fighter: Team Joanna vs. Team Cláudia light heavyweight winner Andrew Sanchez and Marvin Vettori was originally scheduled for September 14 at UFC Fight Night: Cowboy vs. Gaethje. However, the bout was canceled after Sanchez was pulled during the week leading up to the event due to an eye infection. In turn, the pairing was left intact and rescheduled for this event.

Promotional newcomer Brok Weaver was scheduled to face Thomas Gifford in a lightweight out at the event. However, Weaver pulled out of the bout on October 6 for undisclosed reasons. He was replaced by Mike Davis.

== Results ==
Main Card (ESPN+)
Weight class				Method	Round	Time	Notes
Women's Strawweight	Joanna Jędrzejczyk	def.	Michelle Waterson	Decision (unanimous) (50–45, 50–45, 49–46)	5	5:00
Featherweight	Cub Swanson	def.	Kron Gracie	Decision (unanimous) (30–27, 30–27, 30–27)	3	5:00
Welterweight	Niko Price	def.	James Vick	KO (upkick)	1	1:44
Women's Strawweight	Amanda Ribas	def.	Mackenzie Dern	Decision (unanimous) (30–27, 30–27, 30–27)	3	5:00
Lightweight	Matt Frevola	def.	Luis Peña	Decision (split) (28–29, 29–28, 29–28)	3	5:00
Middleweight	Eryk Anders	def.	Gerald Meerschaert	Decision (split) (28–29, 29–28, 29–28)	3	5:00
Preliminary Card (ESPN+)
Light Heavyweight	Ryan Spann	def.	Devin Clark	Submission (guillotine choke)	2	2:01
Lightweight	Mike Davis	def.	Thomas Gifford	KO (punch)	3	4:45
Welterweight	Alex Morono	def.	Max Griffin	Decision (unanimous) (29–28, 29–27, 29–27)	3	5:00
Flyweight	Deiveson Figueiredo	def.	Tim Elliott	Submission (guillotine choke)	1	3:08
Bantamweight	Marlon Vera	def.	Andre Ewell	TKO (elbows and punches)	3	3:17
Welterweight	Miguel Baeza	def.	Hector Aldana	TKO (leg kicks and elbows)	2	2:32
Middleweight	Marvin Vettori	def.	Andrew Sanchez	Decision (unanimous) (30–27, 30–27, 30–27)	3	5:00
Women's Flyweight	JJ Aldrich	def.	Lauren Mueller	Decision (unanimous) (30–27, 29–28, 29–28)	3	5:00

== Bonus awards ==
The following fighters received $50,000 bonuses.

- Fight of the Night: Cub Swanson vs. Kron Gracie
- Performance of the Night: Niko Price and Marlon Vera

== See also ==
- List of UFC events
- 2019 in UFC
- List of current UFC fighters
