= UFC 247 =

UFC mixed martial arts event in 2020

UFC 247: Jones vs. Reyes
- The poster for UFC 247: Jones vs. Reyes
- Promotion: Ultimate Fighting Championship
- Date: February 8, 2020
- Venue: Toyota Center
- City: Houston, Texas, United States
- Attendance: 17,401
- Total gate: $3,549,418

Event chronology
UFC Fight Night: Blaydes vs. dos Santos	UFC 247: Jones vs. Reyes	UFC Fight Night: Anderson vs. Błachowicz 2

UFC 247: Jones vs. Reyes was a mixed martial arts event produced by the Ultimate Fighting Championship that took place on February 8, 2020, at the Toyota Center in Houston, Texas, United States.

== Background ==
A UFC Light Heavyweight Championship bout between the current two-time champion Jon Jones and Dominick Reyes served as the headliner.

A UFC Women's Flyweight Championship bout between the current champion Valentina Shevchenko and Katlyn Chookagian served as the co-headliner.

While not officially announced by the organization, the promotion was initially targeting a light heavyweight bout between former interim title challenger Ovince Saint Preux and Ryan Spann to take place at the event. However, promotion matchmakers elected to go in another direction and the pairing was scrapped from the event.

A bantamweight bout between Sean O'Malley and José Alberto Quiñónez was originally scheduled to take place at UFC 229. However, it was scrapped after O'Malley failed a United States Anti-Doping Agency (USADA) drug test. The bout was then expected to take place at this event but it was eventually moved to UFC 248 for unknown reasons.

Dhiego Lima was scheduled to face Alex Morono at the event. However, Lima was forced off the card on January 22 with a neck injury. He was replaced by promotional newcomer Khaos Williams.

Jimmie Rivera was scheduled to face Marlon Vera at the event. However, Rivera pulled out of the fight on January 23 citing an injury. In turn, promotion officials elected to remove Vera from the card entirely.

Antonio Arroyo was expected to face Trevin Giles in a middleweight bout at the event. However, Arroyo pulled out a day before the fight due to medical issues. He was replaced by James Krause, who was already in Houston to corner Youssef Zalal.

== Results ==
Main card
Weight class				Method	Round	Time	Notes
Light Heavyweight	Jon Jones (c)	def.	Dominick Reyes	Decision (unanimous) (48–47, 48–47, 49-46)	5	5:00	(Note: For the UFC Light Heavyweight Championship.)
Women's Flyweight	Valentina Shevchenko (c)	def.	Katlyn Chookagian	TKO (elbows and punches)	3	1:03	(Note: For the UFC Women's Flyweight Championship.)
Heavyweight	Justin Tafa	def.	Juan Adams	TKO (punches)	1	1:59
Featherweight	Dan Ige	def.	Mirsad Bektić	Decision (split) (28–29, 29–28, 29–28)	3	5:00
Heavyweight	Derrick Lewis	def.	Ilir Latifi	Decision (unanimous) (29–28, 29–28, 29–28)	3	5:00
Preliminary Card (ESPN / ESPN+)
Middleweight	Trevin Giles	def.	James Krause	Decision (split) (28–29, 29–28, 29–28)	3	5:00
Women's Flyweight	Lauren Murphy	def.	Andrea Lee	Decision (split) (28–29, 29–28, 30–27)	3	5:00
Welterweight	Khaos Williams	def.	Alex Morono	KO (punches)	1	0:27
Bantamweight	Mario Bautista	def.	Miles Johns	TKO (flying knee and punches)	2	1:41
Early Preliminary Card (UFC Fight Pass / ESPN+)
Bantamweight	Journey Newson	vs.	Domingo Pilarte	No Contest (overturned)	1	0:38	(Note: Originally a TKO (punches) win for Newson; overturned after he tested positive for marijuana.)
Bantamweight	Andre Ewell	def.	Jonathan Martinez	Decision (split) (28–29, 29–28, 30–27)	3	5:00
Featherweight	Youssef Zalal	def.	Austin Lingo	Decision (unanimous) (30–27, 30–27, 30–27)	3	5:00

== Bonus awards ==
The following fighters received $50,000 bonuses.

- Fight of the Night: Trevin Giles vs. James Krause
- Performance of the Night: Khaos Williams and Mario Bautista

== Aftermath ==
On March 25, it was announced by the Texas Department of Licensing and Regulation (TDLR) that Journey Newson tested positive for marijuana in in-competition drug tests. His victory was also overturned to a no contest and he could face a fine and suspension, likely no longer than 90 days, per Texas regulations.

== Controversy ==
Jon Jones' victory over Dominick Reyes in the main event is highly disputed among the UFC and Mixed Martial Arts community. The judges scored the contest 48-47 (Jones), 48-47 (Jones), and 49-46 (Jones). Despite this, 14 of 21 media outlets present scored the fight in favor of Reyes, with 7 scoring for Jones..

== See also ==
- List of UFC events
- List of current UFC fighters
- 2020 in UFC
