= Niko Price =

American mixed martial arts fighter

- Born: Nicholas Gordon Price; September 29, 1989 (age 37); Cape Coral, Florida, U.S.
- Other names: The Hybrid
- Height: 6 ft 0 in (1.83 m)
- Weight: 170 lb (77 kg; 12 st)
- Division: Welterweight
- Reach: 76 in (193 cm)
- Fighting out of: Cape Coral, Florida, U.S.
- Team: Vickery Jiujitsu and Syndicate Boxing Club
- Rank: Brown belt in Brazilian Jiu-Jitsu
- Years active: 2012–2026

Mixed martial arts record
- Total: 30
- Wins: 17
- By knockout: 11
- By submission: 3
- By decision: 3
- Losses: 11
- By knockout: 6
- By submission: 3
- By decision: 2
- No contests: 2

Other information
- Mixed martial arts record from Sherdog

Nicholas Gordon "Niko" Price (born September 29, 1989) is an American former mixed martial artist who competed in the Welterweight division of the Ultimate Fighting Championship.

== Background ==
Born and raised in Cape Coral, Florida, Price attended Mariner High School where he played linebacker for the school's football team. Upon graduating, Price began training in kickboxing, winning two bouts both via knockout. Price briefly went to college, studying criminal justice. He started training mixed martial arts in 2008.

== Mixed martial arts career ==
=== Early career ===
After going undefeated (9–0) as an amateur, Price made his professional MMA debut in February 2012. Before joining the UFC Price amassed a record of 8–0 with 7 of his 8 wins coming by stoppages.

=== Ultimate Fighting Championship ===
Price made his promotional debut for the UFC at UFC 207 against Brandon Thatch. He won the fight via submission in the first round.

Price next fight came at UFC Fight Night 104 against Alex Morono. He won the fight via knockout in the second round; however, this was later overturned to a no contest after he tested positive for marijuana.

Price next faced Alan Jouban at UFC Fight Night 114 on August 5, 2017. He won the fight via TKO in round one. The win also earned Price his first Performance of the Night bonus award.

Price was to face Luan Chagas on October 28, 2017, at UFC Fight Night 119. On October 6, it was announced that Chagas had pulled out of the bout due to a fractured foot and was replaced by Vicente Luque. Price lost the fight via D'Arce variation of the brabo in Brazil or D’Arce choke submission after a combination of strikes had him appearing out on his feet in round two.

Price faced George Sullivan January 27, 2018, at UFC on Fox 27. He won the fight by rear-naked choke submission in the second round.

Price was expected to face Belal Muhammad on June 1, 2018, at UFC Fight Night 131. However, Price was removed from the bout on May 22 for undisclosed reasons and replaced by promotional newcomer Chance Rencountre.

Price faced Randy Brown on July 14, 2018, at UFC Fight Night 133. He won the fight via knockout in the second round after landing several hammerfists from the bottom to knock Brown out. This win earned him the Performance of the Night award.

Price faced Abdul Razak Alhassan on September 8, 2018, at UFC 228. He lost the fight via knockout in the first round.

Price faced Tim Means on March 9, 2019, at UFC Fight Night 146. He won via knockout in the first round, becoming the first man to finish Means by knockout in MMA competition. This win earned him the Performance of the Night award.

Price faced Geoff Neal on July 27, 2019, at UFC 240. He lost the fight via technical knockout in round two.

Price faced James Vick on October 12, 2019, at UFC Fight Night 161. He won the fight via knockout in round one after landing an upkick from the bottom to knock Vick out. This win earned him the Performance of the Night bonus award.

Price was expected to face Muslim Salikhov on April 11, 2020, at UFC Fight Night: Overeem vs. Harris. Due to the COVID-19 pandemic, the event was eventually postponed.

On March 21, 2020, Price announced that he had signed a new, four-fight contract with the UFC.

Price was scheduled to face Vicente Luque in a rematch on April 18, 2020, at UFC 249. However, on April 9, Dana White, the president of UFC announced that this event was postponed and the bout eventually took place on May 9, 2020. He lost the fight via technical knockout due to doctor stoppage in round three.

Price faced Donald Cerrone on September 19, 2020, at UFC Fight Night 178. The fight was declared a majority draw. On November 4, it was announced that the Nevada State Athletic Commission (NSAC) issued a temporary suspension for Price, after he tested positive for carboxy THC in a drug test related to his fight. On December 2, 2020, it was announced that the bout was overturned to no contest and Price was suspended for six months and fined $8,500.

Price faced Michel Pereira on July 10, 2021, at UFC 264. He lost the fight via unanimous decision.

As the first bout of his new four-fight contract, Price faced Alex Oliveira on October 2, 2021, at UFC Fight Night 192. He won the fight via unanimous decision.

Price faced Philip Rowe on December 3, 2022, at UFC on ESPN 42. After knocking Rowe down in the earlier rounds, Price lost the bout via TKO stoppage in the third.

Price faced former UFC Welterweight champion Robbie Lawler on July 8, 2023, at UFC 290. He was knocked out 38 seconds into the bout.

Price was scheduled to face Jeremiah Wells on June 1, 2024 at UFC 302. However, Wells was pulled from the bout and was replaced with Alex Morono in a rematch. Price won the fight by unanimous decision.

Price faced Themba Gorimbo on October 12, 2024 at UFC Fight Night 244. He lost the fight by unanimous decision.

Price faced Jacobe Smith on June 28, 2025 at UFC 317. He lost the fight via a rear-naked choke submission in the second round.

Replacing promotional newcomer José Henrique Souza who withdrew for undisclosed reasons, Price faced Nikolay Veretennikov on February 7, 2026 at UFC Fight Night 266. He lost the fight by knockout in the first round.

Replacing Carlston Harris who withdrew due to visa issues, Price faced Michael Chiesa on March 28, 2026 at UFC Fight Night 271 in his retirement fight. He lost the fight via a rear-naked submission in the first round and retired from mixed martial arts competition after the bout.

Despite retiring in March, Price returned to competition to face Leon Shahbazyan on October 10, 2026 at UFC Fight Night 290. He won the fight by technical knockout in the first round. In his post-fight interview, he said, "You might see me again, you never know," leaving open the possibility of a return.

== Professional grappling career ==
Price competed against Pat Sabatini at Fury Pro Grappling 8 on December 30, 2023. He lost the match by submission.

== Personal life ==
Niko and his wife Erica have six children. On June 1, 2024 at the UFC 302 press conference, Price confirmed that he and his wife are expecting their seventh child.

== Championships and accomplishments ==
- Ultimate Fighting Championship
  - Performance of the Night (Four times) vs. Alan Jouban, Randy Brown, Tim Means and James Vick
  - UFC Honors Awards
    - 2019: Fan's Choice Knockout of the Year Nominee vs. James Vick
  - UFC.com Awards
    - 2018: Ranked #9 Knockout of the Year vs. Randy Brown
    - 2019: Ranked #4 Knockout of the Year vs. James Vick
    - 2020: Ranked #10 Fight of the Year vs. Vicente Luque 2
- MMA Junkie
  - 2019 October Knockout of the Month vs. James Vick
  - 2020 May Fight of the Month vs. Vicente Luque
- CBS Sports
  - 2019 #2 Ranked UFC Knockout of the Year vs. James Vick

== Mixed martial arts record ==
Professional record breakdown
30 matches	17 wins	11 losses
By knockout	11	6
By submission	3	3
By decision	3	2
No contests	2	

Res.	Record	Opponent	Method	Event	Date	Round	Time	Location	Notes
Win	17–11 (2)	Leon Shahbazyan	TKO (punches)	UFC Fight Night: Allen vs. Duncan	October 10, 2026	1	1:58	Las Vegas, Nevada, United States	
Loss	16–11 (2)	Michael Chiesa	Submission (rear-naked choke)	UFC Fight Night: Adesanya vs. Pyfer	March 28, 2026	1	1:03	Seattle, Washington, United States	
Loss	16–10 (2)	Nikolay Veretennikov	KO (elbow and punches)	UFC Fight Night: Bautista vs. Oliveira	February 7, 2026	1	1:42	Las Vegas, Nevada, United States	
Loss	16–9 (2)	Jacobe Smith	Submission (rear-naked choke)	UFC 317	June 28, 2025	2	4:03	Las Vegas, Nevada, United States	
Loss	16–8 (2)	Themba Gorimbo	Decision (unanimous)	UFC Fight Night: Royval vs. Taira	October 12, 2024	3	5:00	Las Vegas, Nevada, United States	
Win	16–7 (2)	Alex Morono	Decision (unanimous)	UFC 302	June 1, 2024	3	5:00	Newark, New Jersey, United States	
Loss	15–7 (2)	Robbie Lawler	KO (punches)	UFC 290	July 8, 2023	1	0:38	Las Vegas, Nevada, United States	
Loss	15–6 (2)	Philip Rowe	TKO (punches)	UFC on ESPN: Thompson vs. Holland	December 3, 2022	3	3:26	Orlando, Florida, United States	Catchweight (173.5 lb) bout; Rowe missed weight.
Win	15–5 (2)	Alex Oliveira	Decision (unanimous)	UFC Fight Night: Santos vs. Walker	October 2, 2021	3	5:00	Las Vegas, Nevada, United States	
Loss	14–5 (2)	Michel Pereira	Decision (unanimous)	UFC 264	July 10, 2021	3	5:00	Las Vegas, Nevada, United States	
NC	14–4 (2)	Donald Cerrone	NC (overturned)	UFC Fight Night: Covington vs. Woodley	September 19, 2020	3	5:00	Las Vegas, Nevada, United States	Price was deducted one point in round 1 for repeated eye pokes. Originally a majority draw; overturned after Price tested positive for carboxy THC.
Loss	14–4 (1)	Vicente Luque	TKO (doctor stoppage)	UFC 249	May 9, 2020	3	3:37	Jacksonville, Florida, United States	
Win	14–3 (1)	James Vick	KO (upkick)	UFC Fight Night: Joanna vs. Waterson	October 12, 2019	1	1:44	Tampa, Florida, United States	Performance of the Night.
Loss	13–3 (1)	Geoff Neal	TKO (punches)	UFC 240	July 27, 2019	2	2:39	Edmonton, Alberta, Canada	
Win	13–2 (1)	Tim Means	KO (punches)	UFC Fight Night: Lewis vs. dos Santos	March 9, 2019	1	4:50	Wichita, Kansas, United States	Performance of the Night.
Loss	12–2 (1)	Abdul Razak Alhassan	KO (punch)	UFC 228	September 8, 2018	1	0:43	Dallas, Texas, United States	
Win	12–1 (1)	Randy Brown	KO (punches)	UFC Fight Night: dos Santos vs. Ivanov	July 14, 2018	2	1:09	Boise, Idaho, United States	Performance of the Night.
Win	11–1 (1)	George Sullivan	Submission (rear-naked choke)	UFC on Fox: Jacaré vs. Brunson 2	January 27, 2018	2	4:21	Charlotte, North Carolina, United States	
Loss	10–1 (1)	Vicente Luque	Submission (D’Arce choke)	UFC Fight Night: Brunson vs. Machida	October 28, 2017	2	4:08	São Paulo, Brazil	
Win	10–0 (1)	Alan Jouban	TKO (punches)	UFC Fight Night: Pettis vs. Moreno	August 5, 2017	1	1:44	Mexico City, Mexico	Performance of the Night.
NC	9–0 (1)	Alex Morono	NC (overturned)	UFC Fight Night: Bermudez vs. The Korean Zombie	February 4, 2017	2	5:00	Houston, Texas, United States	Originally a KO (punch) win for Price; overturned after he tested positive for marijuana.
Win	9–0	Brandon Thatch	Submission (arm-triangle choke)	UFC 207	December 30, 2016	1	4:30	Las Vegas, Nevada, United States	
Win	8–0	Willie Hosch	Decision (unanimous)	Fight Time 32	August 12, 2016	3	5:00	Fort Lauderdale, Florida, United States	
Win	7–0	Jose Caceres	TKO (punches)	Fight Time 30	April 22, 2016	1	1:31	Fort Lauderdale, Florida, United States	Defended the Fight Time Welterweight Championship.
Win	6–0	Maurice Salmon	TKO (punches)	Fight Time 26	July 17, 2015	1	2:38	Fort Lauderdale, Florida, United States	Won the Fight Time Welterweight Championship.
Win	5–0	Michael Lilly	TKO (punches)	Fight Time 23	February 6, 2015	2	1:05	Miami, Florida, United States	
Win	4–0	Danilo Padilha Da Silva	TKO (punches)	Fight Time 21	November 7, 2014	1	0:22	Fort Lauderdale, Florida, United States	
Win	3–0	David Hayes	TKO (punches)	Fight Time 20	August 29, 2014	1	3:07	Fort Lauderdale, Florida, United States	
Win	2–0	Mikerson Lindor	TKO (punches)	Fight Time 19	May 30, 2014	1	4:59	Fort Lauderdale, Florida, United States	
Win	1–0	Alejandro Gomez	Submission (armbar)	Fight Time 8	February 17, 2012	1	2:49	Fort Lauderdale, Florida, United States	

== See also ==
- List of male mixed martial artists
