= UFC 256 =

UFC mixed martial arts event in 2020

UFC 256: Figueiredo vs. Moreno
- The poster for UFC 256: Figueiredo vs. Moreno
- Promotion: Ultimate Fighting Championship
- Date: December 12, 2020
- Venue: UFC Apex
- City: Enterprise, Nevada, United States
- Attendance: None (behind closed doors)

Event chronology
UFC on ESPN: Hermansson vs. Vettori	UFC 256: Figueiredo vs. Moreno	UFC Fight Night: Thompson vs. Neal

UFC 256: Figueiredo vs. Moreno was a mixed martial arts event produced by the Ultimate Fighting Championship that took place on December 12, 2020 at the UFC Apex facility in Enterprise, Nevada, part of the Las Vegas Metropolitan Area, United States.

== Background ==
The promotion was initially targeting a UFC Welterweight Championship bout between current champion Kamaru Usman (also The Ultimate Fighter: American Top Team vs. Blackzilians welterweight winner) and Gilbert Burns to serve as the event headliner. The pairing was previously scheduled to meet in July at UFC 251. However, Burns was pulled from the contest after he and his coach, Greg Jones, tested positive for COVID-19. In turn, Usman faced, and defeated Jorge Masvidal at that event. On October 5, it was reported Usman pulled out from this bout, citing more time needed to recover from undisclosed injuries and the bout was postponed.

While not officially announced by the organization, the promotion was also targeting a UFC Women's Featherweight Championship bout between the current champion Amanda Nunes (also the current UFC Women's Bantamweight Champion) and former Invicta FC Featherweight Champion Megan Anderson to serve as the event headliner. In turn, it was announced on November 9 that Nunes pulled out due to an undisclosed injury and the bout was postponed to 2021.

A UFC Bantamweight Championship bout between current champion Petr Yan and Aljamain Sterling was originally scheduled to serve as the co-main event. Due to the aforementioned cancelations, they were then expected to headline the card. On November 22, Russian media revealed that the fight was also canceled for personal reasons related to Yan and is expected to be booked at a later date. Those "personal reasons" were later revealed to be related to visa and travel issues.

Following his first title defense at UFC 255 on November 21, UFC Flyweight Champion Deiveson Figueiredo headlined this event against Brandon Moreno, who also fought at that same date. This booking represented the shortest turnaround between title fights by a champion in UFC history at just 21 days. Former Rizin FF Bantamweight Champion Manel Kape, who was expected to make his promotional debut a week later at UFC Fight Night: Thompson vs. Neal, served as a potential replacement.

Former Invicta FC and UFC Women's Strawweight Champion Carla Esparza (also The Ultimate Fighter: A Champion Will Be Crowned women's strawweight winner) was briefly scheduled to face Amanda Ribas at the event. However on October 9, it was announced that Esparza was pulled due to undisclosed reasons. Ribas was rescheduled against former Invicta FC Atomweight Champion Michelle Waterson at UFC 257.

A middleweight rematch between Omari Akhmedov and Marvin Vettori was briefly linked to the event. The pairing met previously at UFC 219 in December 2017, when they fought to a majority draw. On October 13, it was announced that Akhmedov pulled out due to undisclosed reasons and was replaced by former Strikeforce Middleweight Champion Ronaldo Souza. In turn, Vettori was removed from the contest to serve as a replacement for the main event of UFC on ESPN: Hermansson vs. Vettori a week earlier. Kevin Holland, whom Vettori replaced due to a COVID-19 positive test, was rescheduled to face Souza at this event.

A featherweight bout between Billy Quarantillo and Gavin Tucker took place at this event. The pairing was previously scheduled to meet at an event on April 25 that was cancelled due to the COVID-19 pandemic.

Renato Moicano and Rafael Fiziev were expected to meet in a lightweight bout at UFC on ESPN: Smith vs. Clark. In turn, Moicano pulled out after testing positive for COVID-19 and the bout was rescheduled for this event.

Andrea Lee was expected to face Gillian Robertson in a women's flyweight bout at this event. However, Lee pulled out in early December due to a broken nose and Robertson was rescheduled to face Taila Santos at UFC Fight Night: Thompson vs. Neal.

A week before the event, several fights were impacted by the COVID-19 pandemic:

- A women's strawweight rematch between former Invicta FC Strawweight Champion Angela Hill and Tecia Torres was expected to take place at this event. The pairing met previously at UFC 188 in June 2015, when Torres won by unanimous decision. However, Hill tested positive on December 6 and was removed from the bout. Torres faced promotional newcomer Sam Hughes.
- Karl Roberson and Dalcha Lungiambula were expected to meet in a middleweight bout at this card, but were eventually rescheduled for the following week's event due to Roberson's positive test.
- Dwight Grant also tested positive for COVID-19 during fight week and had to pull out of his welterweight bout against Li Jingliang. A replacement wasn't able to be found and therefore Li was removed from the event.
- Two days before the event, Jared Vanderaa also pulled out of the event due to a positive test. He was scheduled to face Sergey Spivak in a heavyweight bout.

== Results ==
Main card
Weight class				Method	Round	Time	Notes
Flyweight	Deiveson Figueiredo (c)	vs.	Brandon Moreno	Draw (majority) (48–46, 47–47, 47–47)	5	5:00	(Note: For the UFC Flyweight Championship. Figueiredo was deducted one point in round 3 for a groin strike.)
Lightweight	Charles Oliveira	def.	Tony Ferguson	Decision (unanimous) (30–26, 30–26, 30–26)	3	5:00
Women's Strawweight	Mackenzie Dern	def.	Virna Jandiroba	Decision (unanimous) (29–28, 29–28, 29–28)	3	5:00
Middleweight	Kevin Holland	def.	Ronaldo Souza	KO (punches)	1	1:45
Heavyweight	Ciryl Gane	def.	Junior dos Santos	TKO (elbow)	2	2:34
Preliminary card (ESPN2 / ESPN+)
Featherweight	Cub Swanson	def.	Daniel Pineda	KO (punches)	2	1:52
Lightweight	Rafael Fiziev	def.	Renato Moicano	KO (punches)	1	4:05
Featherweight	Gavin Tucker	def.	Billy Quarantillo	Decision (unanimous) (30–27, 30–27, 30–27)	3	5:00
Women's Strawweight	Tecia Torres	def.	Sam Hughes	TKO (doctor stoppage)	1	5:00
Early preliminary card (ESPN+ / UFC Fight Pass)
Featherweight	Chase Hooper	def.	Peter Barrett	Submission (heel hook)	3	3:02

== Bonus awards ==
The following fighters received $50,000 bonuses.

- Fight of the Night: Deiveson Figueiredo vs. Brandon Moreno
- Performance of the Night: Kevin Holland and Rafael Fiziev

== Aftermath ==
This event won the UFC Honors 2020 Event of the Year award as voted by the fans.

== See also ==
- List of UFC events
- List of current UFC fighters
- 2020 in UFC
