= UFC Fight Night: Holloway vs. Rodríguez =

2021 MMA event

- The poster for UFC Fight Night: Holloway vs. Rodríguez
- Promotion: Ultimate Fighting Championship
- Date: November 13, 2021
- Venue: UFC Apex
- City: Enterprise, Nevada, United States
- Attendance: Not announced

Event chronology
UFC 268: Usman vs. Covington 2	UFC Fight Night: Holloway vs. Rodríguez	UFC Fight Night: Vieira vs. Tate

UFC Fight Night: Holloway vs. Rodríguez (also known as UFC Fight Night 197, UFC Vegas 42 and UFC on ESPN+ 55) was a mixed martial arts event produced by the Ultimate Fighting Championship that took place on November 13, 2021, at the UFC Apex facility in Enterprise, Nevada, part of the Las Vegas Metropolitan Area, United States.

== Background ==
On October 19, it was announced that the UFC sent a memo to fighters and their staff regarding policy changes to U.S. international travel requirements. Starting on November 8, foreign individuals looking to travel to the United States will need to be fully vaccinated with, and provide proof of, one of seven World Health Organization approved vaccines. They will also need a negative COVID-19 test from a 72-hour period prior to travel. The policy also applies to those crossing from Canada or Mexico, or those coming by ship. This was the first event under such requirement.

A featherweight bout between former UFC Featherweight Champion Max Holloway and The Ultimate Fighter: Latin America featherweight winner Yair Rodríguez served as the event headliner. The pairing was previously scheduled to headline UFC on ESPN: Makhachev vs. Moisés, but Holloway was pulled from the bout during the weeks leading up to that event due to injury.

A light heavyweight bout between Kennedy Nzechukwu and Da Un Jung was originally expected to take place at UFC Fight Night: Ladd vs. Dumont, but it was pushed back to this event for unknown reasons.

A women's flyweight bout between former UFC Women's Flyweight Championship challenger Jessica Eye and Andrea Lee was scheduled for the event. However, Eye pulled out of the bout in mid-October citing illness and was replaced by Cynthia Calvillo.

Two middleweight bouts between Kevin Holland and Kyle Daukaus, as well as Eryk Anders and Roman Dolidze were scheduled for the event. However, Holland withdrew from his bout due to injury, and Anders withdrew from the event for undisclosed reasons. Daukaus and Dolidze were then scheduled to face each other instead. In turn, the bout was scrapped due to COVID-19 protocols related to Dolidze's camp.

A lightweight bout between Marc Diakiese and Rafael Alves was rescheduled for the event. The pair was previously expected to meet at UFC Fight Night: Brunson vs. Till, but Alves pulled out of the fight in mid-August due to undisclosed reasons and the bout was scrapped.

A featherweight bout between Lando Vannata and Tucker Lutz was expected to take place at this event. However, Lutz was pulled from the bout and instead scheduled to face Pat Sabatini at UFC Fight Night: Vieira vs. Tate.

Former interim UFC Light Heavyweight Championship challenger Ovince Saint Preux was expected to face Philipe Lins in a light heavyweight bout at the event. In turn, Saint Preux withdrew from the fight for undisclosed reasons and the bout was cancelled.

A light heavyweight bout between Danilo Marques and Jailton Almeida was scheduled for this event. However, the bout was rescheduled due to Danilo getting injured and it is now expected to take place at UFC Fight Night 201.

At the weigh-ins, two fighters missed weight for their respective bouts. Joel Álvarez weighed in at 157.5 pounds, one and a half pounds over the lightweight non-title fight limit. Liana Jojua weighed in at 128.5 pounds, two and a half pounds over the women's flyweight non-title fight limit. Both bouts proceeded at catchweight with Álvarez and Jojua each fined 30% of their purses, which went to their opponents Thiago Moisés and Cortney Casey respectively.

With eight knockouts, this event tied the record for most knockouts in a single UFC event.

== Results ==
Main card (ESPN+)
Weight class				Method	Round	Time	Notes
Featherweight	Max Holloway	def.	Yair Rodríguez	Decision (unanimous) (49–46, 48–47, 48–47)	5	5:00
Heavyweight	Marcos Rogério de Lima	def.	Ben Rothwell	TKO (punches)	1	0:32
Women's Featherweight	Felicia Spencer	def.	Leah Letson	TKO (punches)	3	4:25
Welterweight	Khaos Williams	def.	Miguel Baeza	TKO (punches)	3	1:02
Bantamweight	Song Yadong	def.	Julio Arce	TKO (head kick and punches)	2	1:35
Preliminary card (ESPN+)
Catchweight (157.5 lb)	Joel Álvarez	def.	Thiago Moisés	TKO (elbows and punches)	1	3:01
Women's Flyweight	Andrea Lee	def.	Cynthia Calvillo	TKO (corner stoppage)	2	5:00
Featherweight	Sean Woodson	def.	Collin Anglin	TKO (punches to the body)	1	4:30
Catchweight (128.5 lb)	Cortney Casey	def.	Liana Jojua	Decision (unanimous) (30–27, 30–27, 30–27)	3	5:00
Lightweight	Rafael Alves	def.	Marc Diakiese	Submission (guillotine choke)	1	1:48
Light Heavyweight	Da Un Jung	def.	Kennedy Nzechukwu	KO (elbows)	1	3:04

== Bonus awards ==
The following fighters received $50,000 bonuses.

- Fight of the Night: Max Holloway vs. Yair Rodríguez
- Performance of the Night: Khaos Williams and Andrea Lee

== See also ==
- List of UFC events
- List of current UFC fighters
- 2021 in UFC
