= Khaos Williams =

American mixed martial arts fighter

- Born: March 30, 1994 (age 32); South Bend, Indiana, U.S.
- Other names: Khaos the Ox Fighter
- Height: 6 ft 0 in (1.83 m)
- Weight: 170 lb (77 kg; 12 st 2 lb)
- Division: Welterweight
- Reach: 77 in (196 cm)
- Fighting out of: Detroit, Michigan, U.S.
- Team: Murcielago MMA
- Rank: Blue belt in Brazilian Jiu-Jitsu
- Years active: 2017–present

Mixed martial arts record
- Total: 22
- Wins: 16
- By knockout: 9
- By submission: 1
- By decision: 6
- Losses: 6
- By submission: 1
- By decision: 5

Other information
- Mixed martial arts record from Sherdog

Khaos Williams (born March 30, 1994) is an American mixed martial artist who currently competes in the Welterweight division of the Ultimate Fighting Championship.

== Background ==
Williams got his first taste of knockouts in 2008 when he floored another teenager in a street fight and shook hands afterward.

In July 2013, Williams became the first graduate of a cooperative online education program between the Jackson County Sheriff's Office and Jackson Public Schools. Williams earned a high school diploma through an online program while incarcerated in Jackson County Jail after being convicted of selling cocaine. He's had a spotless probation record and has performed all his required community service.

He started training in September 2013 and had his first fight three months later. His interest in MMA started because someone saw him fight and told him that he had it. So afterwards, he found a BJJ gym and fell in love after his first bout. He started training with Leo Aponte, his former Jackson High School teacher and current mixed martial arts coach.

== Mixed martial arts career ==
=== Early career ===
Starting his career in 2017, Williams fought for a variety of Michigan regional promotions, including King of the Cage events held there. He obtained a 9–1 record in this time, most notably winning the Total Warrior Combat Super Lightweight Championship against 36 fight veteran Tony Hervey.

=== Ultimate Fighting Championship ===
Replacing injured Dhiego Lima on short notice, Williams made his promotional debut against Alex Morono at UFC 247 on February 8, 2020. He won the fight via first-minute knockout. This win earned him the Performance of the Night award.

Williams made his sophomore appearance in the organization against Abdul Razak Alhassan at UFC Fight Night 182 on November 14, 2020. He won the fight via first-minute knockout. This win earned him the Performance of the Night award.

Williams faced Michel Pereira at UFC Fight Night 183 on December 19, 2020. He lost the fight via unanimous decision.

Williams faced Matthew Semelsberger on June 19, 2021 at UFC on ESPN 25 He won the bout via unanimous decision.

Williams faced Miguel Baeza on November 13, 2021 at UFC Fight Night 197. He won the fight via technical knockout in round three. This win earned him the Performance of the Night award.

Williams faced Randy Brown on May 7, 2022 at UFC 274. He lost the fight via split decision.

Williams faced Rolando Bedoya on May 6, 2023 at UFC 288. He won the fight by split decision.

Williams faced Carlston Harris on May 18, 2024, at UFC Fight Night 241. He won the fight by knockout after knocking down Harris with a right hook. This fight earned him another Performance of the Night award.

Replacing an injured Rinat Fakhretdinov, Williams faced former LFA Welterweight Champion Gabriel Bonfim on February 15, 2025 at UFC Fight Night 251. He lost the fight via a brabo choke submission in the second round, which was the first time he lost by finish in his MMA career.

Williams was scheduled to face Uroš Medić on June 7, 2025, at UFC 316. However, Medić pulled out in late May due to sinusitis and was replaced by promotional newcomer Albert Tadevosyan. In turn, Tadevosyan did not pass his medical tests, so Williams instead faced promotional newcomer Andreas Gustafsson. Williams lost the fight by unanimous decision.

Williams faced Nikolay Veretennikov on May 16, 2026 at UFC Fight Night 276. He won the fight by technical knockout in the first round.

Williams faced promotional newcomer Roberto Soldić on October 3, 2026 at UFC 332. He lost the fight by unanimous decision.

== Personal life ==
Williams is the biological son of Cynthia Rodgers of Jackson and the adoptive son and biological nephew of Lillian Rodgers of Albion, Michigan.

In 2007, Williams was given his nickname Khaos. He grew up in a rough neighborhood and constantly created chaos. His early sparring partners also nicknamed him The Ox Fighter because he was strong as an ox.

== Championships and accomplishments ==
=== Mixed martial arts ===
- Ultimate Fighting Championship
  - Performance of the Night (Four times) vs. Alex Morono, Abdul Razak Alhassan, Miguel Baeza and Carlston Harris
  - UFC Honors Awards
    - 2020: Fan's Choice Knockout of the Year Nominee vs. Abdul Razak Alhassan & Fan's Choice Debut of the Year Nominee vs. Alex Morono
  - UFC.com Awards
    - 2020: Ranked #4 Newcomer of the Year, Ranked #4 Upset of the Year vs. Alex Morono & Ranked #6 Knockout of the Year vs. Abdul Razak Alhassan
- Total Warrior Combat
  - TWC Super Lightweight (165 lb) Championship
- MMAjunkie.com
  - 2020 November Knockout of the Month vs. Abdul Razak Alhassan

== Mixed martial arts record ==
Professional record breakdown
22 matches	16 wins	6 losses
By knockout	9	0
By submission	1	1
By decision	6	5

Res.	Record	Opponent	Method	Event	Date	Round	Time	Location	Notes
Loss	16–6	Roberto Soldić	Decision (unanimous)	UFC 332	October 3, 2026	3	5:00	Salt Lake City, Utah, United States	
Win	16–5	Nikolay Veretennikov	TKO (punches)	UFC Fight Night: Allen vs. Costa	May 16, 2026	1	3:31	Las Vegas, Nevada, United States	
Loss	15–5	Andreas Gustafsson	Decision (unanimous)	UFC 316	June 7, 2025	3	5:00	Newark, New Jersey, United States	
Loss	15–4	Gabriel Bonfim	Technical Submission (brabo choke)	UFC Fight Night: Cannonier vs. Rodrigues	February 15, 2025	2	4:58	Las Vegas, Nevada, United States	
Win	15–3	Carlston Harris	KO (punch)	UFC Fight Night: Barboza vs. Murphy	May 18, 2024	1	1:30	Las Vegas, Nevada, United States	Performance of the Night.
Win	14–3	Rolando Bedoya	Decision (split)	UFC 288	May 6, 2023	3	5:00	Newark, New Jersey, United States	
Loss	13–3	Randy Brown	Decision (split)	UFC 274	May 7, 2022	3	5:00	Phoenix, Arizona, United States	
Win	13–2	Miguel Baeza	TKO (punches)	UFC Fight Night: Holloway vs. Rodríguez	November 13, 2021	3	1:02	Las Vegas, Nevada, United States	Performance of the Night.
Win	12–2	Matthew Semelsberger	Decision (unanimous)	UFC on ESPN: The Korean Zombie vs. Ige	June 19, 2021	3	5:00	Las Vegas, Nevada, United States	
Loss	11–2	Michel Pereira	Decision (unanimous)	UFC Fight Night: Thompson vs. Neal	December 19, 2020	3	5:00	Las Vegas, Nevada, United States	
Win	11–1	Abdul Razak Alhassan	KO (punch)	UFC Fight Night: Felder vs. dos Anjos	November 14, 2020	1	0:30	Las Vegas, Nevada, United States	Catchweight (172.5 lb) bout; Alhassan missed weight. Performance of the Night.
Win	10–1	Alex Morono	KO (punches)	UFC 247	February 8, 2020	1	0:27	Houston, Texas, United States	Performance of the Night.
Win	9–1	Jeremie Holloway	Decision (unanimous)	Warrior Xtreme Cagefighting 84	November 27, 2019	3	5:00	Southgate, Michigan, United States	
Win	8–1	Bo Yan	TKO (punches)	Beijing Combat 4	October 26, 2019	1	0:24	Beijing, China	
Win	7–1	Ladarious Jackson	Submission (guillotine choke)	Warrior Xtreme Cagefighting 82	September 25, 2019	1	4:59	Southgate, Michigan, United States	
Win	6–1	Tony Hervey	Decision (unanimous)	Total Warrior Combat: Townsend vs. Carter	March 9, 2019	3	5:00	Lansing, Michigan, United States	Won the TWC Super Lightweight (165 lb) Championship.
Win	5–1	P.J. Cajigas	Decision (unanimous)	Total Warrior Combat: Bennett vs. Shaw	December 1, 2018	3	5:00	Lansing, Michigan, United States	
Win	4–1	J.P. Saint Louis	KO (punch)	KOTC: Hard Knocks 3	July 28, 2018	1	1:22	Wyandotte, Michigan, United States	
Loss	3–1	Dan Yates	Decision (unanimous)	KnockOut Promotions 60	February 24, 2018	3	5:00	Grand Rapids, Michigan, United States	
Win	3–0	Erick Lora-Martinez	Decision (unanimous)	KnockOut Promotions 59	December 16, 2017	3	5:00	Grand Rapids, Michigan, United States	
Win	2–0	Carrese Archer	TKO (punches)	KOTC: Second Coming	August 5, 2017	2	2:05	Wyandotte, Michigan, United States	
Win	1–0	Brandon Johnson	TKO (punches)	KOTC: Supremacy	April 29, 2017	1	1:59	Wyandotte, Michigan, United States	Welterweight debut.

== See also ==
- List of current UFC fighters
- List of male mixed martial artists
