= UFC 264 =

2021 MMA event

UFC 264: Poirier vs. McGregor 3
- The poster for UFC 264: Poirier vs. McGregor 3
- Promotion: Ultimate Fighting Championship
- Date: July 10, 2021
- Venue: T-Mobile Arena
- City: Paradise, Nevada, United States
- Attendance: 20,062
- Total gate: $15,759,800
- Buyrate: 1,800,000

Event chronology
UFC Fight Night: Gane vs. Volkov	UFC 264: Poirier vs. McGregor 3	UFC on ESPN: Makhachev vs. Moisés

UFC 264: Poirier vs. McGregor 3 was a mixed martial arts event produced by the Ultimate Fighting Championship that took place on July 10, 2021 at the T-Mobile Arena in Paradise, Nevada, part of the Las Vegas Metropolitan Area, United States.

== Background ==
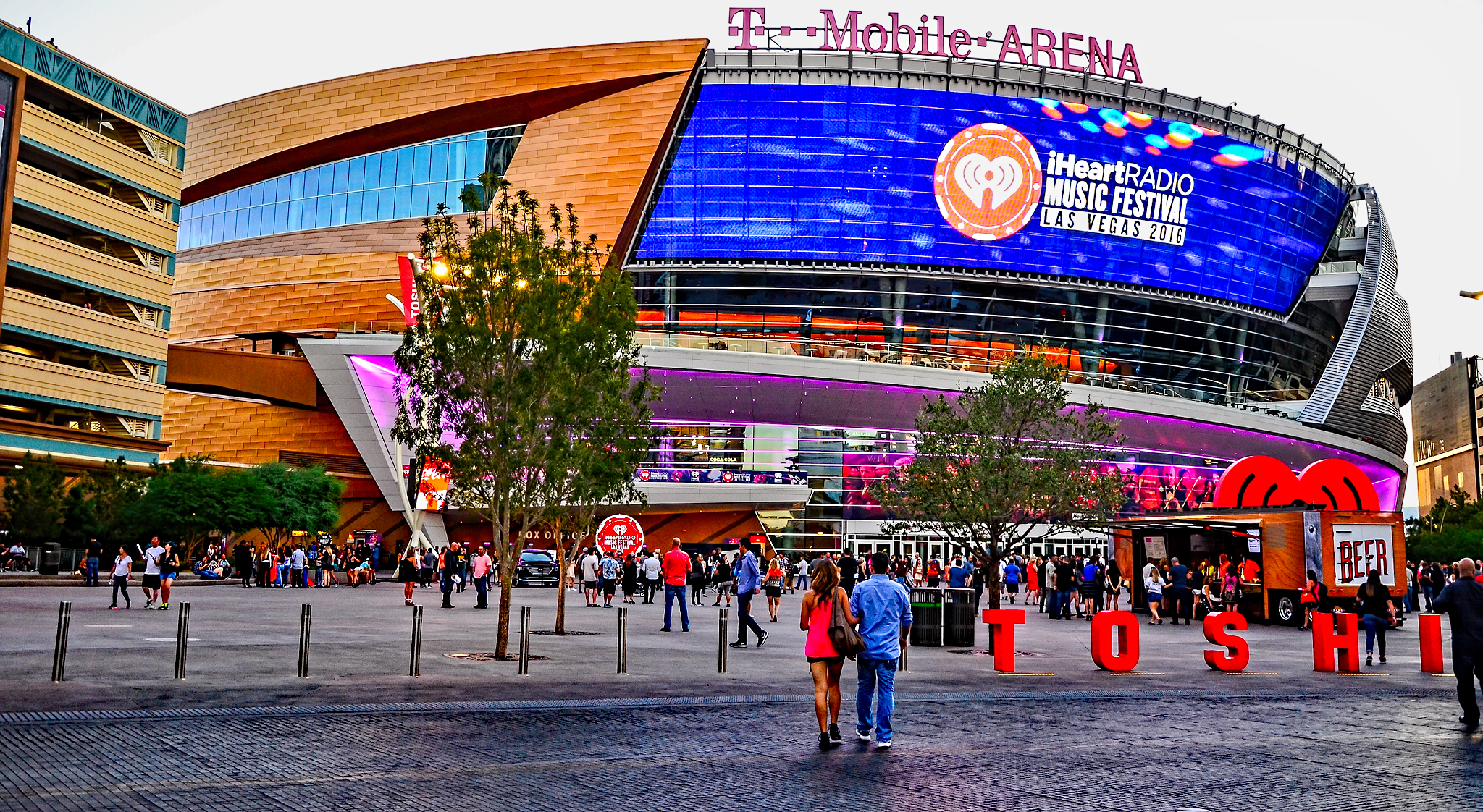
Due to the COVID-19 pandemic, the UFC has been hosting most of its events in Las Vegas at the UFC Apex facility, all of them behind closed doors. This was the first time since UFC 248 in March 2020 that T-Mobile Arena hosted an event, with a full capacity crowd attending it.

A lightweight trilogy between former interim UFC Lightweight Champion Dustin Poirier and former UFC Featherweight and Lightweight Champion Conor McGregor headlined the event. Their first fight was a featherweight bout that happened in September 2014 at UFC 178, where McGregor won by first-round technical knockout. They then ascended to lightweight for an eventual rematch in January 2021 at UFC 257, where Poirier prevailed via second-round knockout. During fight week, it was revealed that former lightweight champion Rafael dos Anjos was selected by the organization to serve as a potential replacement in case of need.

A middleweight bout between former KSW Welterweight Champion and Dricus du Plessis and Trevin Giles was scheduled to take place at UFC on ESPN: Brunson vs. Holland, but du Plessis was pulled from the event due to visa issues which restricted his travel. The pairing was rescheduled and took place at this event.

A welterweight bout between Sean Brady and former interim UFC Lightweight Championship challenger Kevin Lee was expected to take place at the event. However, Lee withdrew due to injury and the bout was removed from the event.

A bantamweight bout between Sean O'Malley and Louis Smolka was expected to take place at the event. However on June 29, Smolka withdrew due to an undisclosed injury. He was replaced by promotional newcomer Kris Moutinho.

At the weigh-ins, Irene Aldana weighed in at 139.5 pounds, three and a half pounds over the bantamweight non-title fight limit. Her bout proceeded at catchweight and she was fined 30% of her purse, which went to her opponent Yana Kunitskaya.

On July 9, it was announced that the UFC would be increasing bonuses (Fight of the Night and Performance of the Night) from $50,000 to $75,000 for this event.

A middleweight bout between Alen Amedovski and Hu Yaozong was scheduled to be the first preliminary bout of the event. However, it was cancelled just hours before taking place due to COVID-19 protocol issues in Amedovski's camp.

== Results ==
Main card
Weight class				Method	Round	Time	Notes
Lightweight	Dustin Poirier	def.	Conor McGregor	TKO (doctor stoppage)	1	5:00
Welterweight	Gilbert Burns	def.	Stephen Thompson	Decision (unanimous) (29–28, 29–28, 29–28)	3	5:00
Heavyweight	Tai Tuivasa	def.	Greg Hardy	KO (punches)	1	1:07
Catchweight (139.5 lb)	Irene Aldana	def.	Yana Kunitskaya	TKO (punches)	1	4:35
Bantamweight	Sean O'Malley	def.	Kris Moutinho	TKO (punches)	3	4:33
Preliminary card (ESPN / ESPN+)
Welterweight	Max Griffin	def.	Carlos Condit	Decision (unanimous) (29–28, 29–28, 30–27)	3	5:00
Welterweight	Michel Pereira	def.	Niko Price	Decision (unanimous) (29–28, 29–28, 29–28)	3	5:00
Featherweight	Ilia Topuria	def.	Ryan Hall	KO (punches)	1	4:47
Middleweight	Dricus du Plessis	def.	Trevin Giles	KO (punches)	2	1:41
Early preliminary card (ESPN+ / UFC Fight Pass)
Women's Flyweight	Jennifer Maia	def.	Jessica Eye	Decision (unanimous) (29–28, 29–28, 30–27)	3	5:00
Middleweight	Brad Tavares	def.	Omari Akhmedov	Decision (split) (28–29, 29–28, 29–28)	3	5:00
Flyweight	Zhalgas Zhumagulov	def.	Jerome Rivera	Submission (guillotine choke)	1	2:02

== Bonus awards ==
The following fighters received $75,000 bonuses.

- Fight of the Night: Sean O'Malley vs. Kris Moutinho
- Performance of the Night: Tai Tuivasa and Dricus du Plessis

== See also ==
- List of UFC events
- List of current UFC fighters
- 2021 in UFC
