= Miguel Baeza =

American mixed martial artist (born 1992)

- Born: August 23, 1992 (age 34); Davie, Florida, U.S.
- Other names: Caramel Thunder
- Height: 6 ft 2 in (1.88 m)
- Weight: 170 lb (77 kg; 12 st 2 lb)
- Division: Welterweight (2016–present); Lightweight (2015)
- Reach: 74 in (188 cm)
- Stance: Orthodox
- Fighting out of: Davie, Florida, United States
- Team: MMA Masters
- Rank: Black belt in Brazilian Jiu-Jitsu
- Years active: 2015–present

Mixed martial arts record
- Total: 14
- Wins: 10
- By knockout: 7
- By submission: 1
- By decision: 2
- Losses: 4
- By knockout: 2
- By decision: 2

Other information
- Mixed martial arts record from Sherdog

Miguel Baeza (born August 23, 1992) is an American mixed martial artist who competed in the Welterweight division of the Ultimate Fighting Championship (UFC).

== Background ==
Baeza was born in Davie, Florida to a Puerto Rican family. Baeza grew up a boxing fan, and he lists Félix Trinidad as one of his all-time favorites. Baeza first dabbled in mixed martial arts in 2011 as an amateur, compiling a record of 4–0 before turning professional in 2015. Baeza holds a Brazilian Jiu-Jitsu black belt.

== Mixed martial arts career ==
=== Dana White's Contender Series ===
After going 6–0 on the regional circuit, Baeza was invited to compete on Dana White's Contender Series 18. He faced Victor Reyna and won the bout via unanimous decision, a victory that earned him a UFC contract.

=== Ultimate Fighting Championship ===
Baeza made his UFC debut at UFC Fight Night 161 on October 12, 2019, facing Hector Aldana. Baeza was victorious via second-round technical knockout.

Baeza then faced veteran Matt Brown on May 16, 2020, at UFC on ESPN 8. Baeza rallied back after being dropped in the first round, finishing Brown via technical knockout in the second round. This win earned Baeza his first Performance of the Night award.

Baeza was set to face Mickey Gall at UFC Fight Night 178. However, on September 11, Gall pulled out due to an injury. He was replaced by Jeremiah Wells. On September 17, it was announced that the bout was canceled due to undisclosed reasons.

Baeza faced Takashi Sato on November 28, 2020, at UFC Fight Night 184. He won via second round arm-triangle choke, thus earning his first career win by submission. He earned a Performance of the Night bonus for the win.

Baeza faced Santiago Ponzinibbio on June 5, 2021, at UFC Fight Night: Rozenstruik vs. Sakai. He lost the back-and-forth fight via unanimous decision. This bout earned him the Fight of the Night award.

Baeza faced Khaos Williams on November 13, 2021, at UFC Fight Night 197. He lost the fight via technical knockout in round three.

Baeza was scheduled to face Dhiego Lima on April 16, 2022, at UFC on ESPN: Luque vs. Muhammad 2. However, Lima announced his retirement from competition in MMA in early February 2022 and was subsequently replaced by André Fialho. Baeza lost the fight via technical knockout in round one.

Baeza faced Punahele Soriano on June 8, 2024 at UFC on ESPN 57. He lost the fight by unanimous decision.

On July 30, 2024, it was reported that Baeza was removed from the UFC roster.

== Professional grappling career ==
Baeza was due to face Neil Magny at Fury Pro Grappling 9 on April 4, 2024. Magny withdrew on short notice and was replaced by Guilherme Neves. Baeza won the match by submission with an armbar.

== Championships and accomplishments ==
- Ultimate Fighting Championship
  - Performance of the Night (Two times) vs. Matt Brown and Takashi Sato
  - Fight of the Night (One Time) vs. Santiago Ponzinibbio
  - UFC.com Awards
    - 2021: Ranked #8 Fight of the Year vs. Santiago Ponzinibbio
- MMAjunkie.com
  - 2021 June Fight of the Month vs. Santiago Ponzinibbio
- Fight Matrix
  - 2020 Most Improved Fighter of the Year

== Mixed martial arts record ==
Professional record breakdown
14 matches	10 wins	4 losses
By knockout	7	2
By submission	1	0
By decision	2	2

Res.	Record	Opponent	Method	Event	Date	Round	Time	Location	Notes
Loss	10–4	Punahele Soriano	Decision (unanimous)	UFC on ESPN: Cannonier vs. Imavov	June 8, 2024	3	5:00	Louisville, Kentucky, United States	
Loss	10–3	André Fialho	TKO (punches)	UFC on ESPN: Luque vs. Muhammad 2	April 16, 2022	1	4:39	Las Vegas, Nevada, United States	
Loss	10–2	Khaos Williams	TKO (punches)	UFC Fight Night: Holloway vs. Rodríguez	November 13, 2021	3	1:02	Las Vegas, Nevada, United States	
Loss	10–1	Santiago Ponzinibbio	Decision (unanimous)	UFC Fight Night: Rozenstruik vs. Sakai	June 5, 2021	3	5:00	Las Vegas, Nevada, United States	Fight of the Night.
Win	10–0	Takashi Sato	Submission (arm-triangle choke)	UFC on ESPN: Smith vs. Clark	November 28, 2020	2	4:28	Las Vegas, Nevada, United States	Performance of the Night.
Win	9–0	Matt Brown	TKO (punches)	UFC on ESPN: Overeem vs. Harris	May 16, 2020	2	0:18	Jacksonville, Florida, United States	Performance of the Night.
Win	8–0	Hector Aldana	TKO (leg kick and elbows)	UFC Fight Night: Joanna vs. Waterson	October 12, 2019	2	2:32	Tampa, Florida, United States	
Win	7–0	Victor Reyna	Decision (unanimous)	Dana White's Contender Series 18	June 25, 2019	3	5:00	Las Vegas, Nevada, United States	Catchweight (178 lb) bout; Reyna missed weight.
Win	6–0	Matthew Colquhoun	KO (punches)	XFN 22	December 15, 2018	1	3:31	Ft. Lauderdale, Florida, United States	
Win	5–0	Leo Valdivia	Decision (split)	Fight Time 37	September 1, 2017	3	5:00	Ft. Lauderdale, Florida, United States	
Win	4–0	Augustus D'Angelo	TKO (pucnhes)	Fight Time 36	April 7, 2017	2	1:14	Ft. Lauderdale, Florida, United States	
Win	3–0	Mike D'Angelo	KO (punches)	Fight Time 33	October 21, 2016	1	3:48	Ft. Lauderdale, Florida, United States	Welterweight debut.
Win	2–0	Emre Orun	KO (punch)	Titan FC 40	August 5, 2016	1	1:45	Coral Gables, Florida, United States	Catchweight (178 lb) bout.
Win	1–0	John McDonald	TKO (punches)	Rings of Dreams: Fight Night 17	August 22, 2015	1	1:21	Winston-Salem, North Carolina, United States	Lightweight debut.

== See also ==
- List of Dana White's Contender Series alumni
- List of male mixed martial artists
