= Antônio Braga Neto =

Brazilian Brazilian Jiu-Jitsu practitioner and mixed martial arts fighter

- Born: October 29, 1987 (age 38); Manaus, Amazon, Brazil
- Height: 6 ft 3 in (1.91 m)
- Weight: 185 lb (84 kg; 13.2 st)
- Division: Welterweight (current); Light Heavyweight (2006-2009); Heavyweight (2009-2010)
- Reach: 77 in (196 cm)
- Stance: Orthodox
- Fighting out of: Singapore
- Team: Gracie Morumbi (2012); Evolve MMA (2010-present); Gracie Fusion (2006-present); Team Brasa (2008); Gracie Barra Cerritos (2009-2012)
- Rank: Black belt in Brazilian Jiu-Jitsu under Roberto "Gordo" Correa
- Years active: 2006-present

Mixed martial arts record
- Total: 13
- Wins: 9
- By knockout: 1
- By submission: 7
- By decision: 1
- Losses: 3
- By knockout: 1
- By decision: 2
- No contests: 1

Other information
- Mixed martial arts record from Sherdog

Antônio Braga Neto
Medal record

Representing Brazil

Men's Black Belt Jiu-Jitsu

World Jiu-Jitsu Championship
Gold medal – first place	2008 Long Beach, California	-100 kg
Gold medal – first place	2011 Long Beach, California	+100 kg

Pan Jiu-Jitsu Championship
Gold medal – first place	2009 Long Beach, California	-100 kg
Gold medal – first place	2009 Long Beach, California	Absolute
Gold medal – first place	2010 Long Beach, California	-100 kg
Gold medal – first place	2011 Long Beach, California	+100 kg

Antônio Braga Neto (born October 29, 1987) is a Brazilian mixed martial artist and grappler. He competed in the Ultimate Fighting Championship. He is a gold medalist in both the World Jiu-Jitsu Championship and Pan American Championship.

== Mixed martial arts career ==
A Brazilian Jiu-Jitsu Black Belt World Champion under Roberto "Gordo" Correa, Neto currently trains out of Evolve MMA in Brazil and Singapore.

=== Early career ===
Neto made his professional MMA debut in October 2006 in his native Brazil. He was undefeated for the first five fights of his career, with only one fight going to a decision.

In 2008, Neto made his debut in Japan when he signed with the Sengoku promotion. He faced Ryo Kawamura and lost by decision, the first loss of his professional career.

In 2009, Neto signed with the Chinese organization Art of War Fighting Championship. He made his debut against Dutch fighter Rodney Glunder; the fight was cut short when a takedown from Neto sent Glunder through the ring ropes onto the floor and some tools and electrical equipment. Glunder suffered injuries to his back and was taken away from the ring on a stretcher by ringside physicians and doctors. Neto competed in the 2011 ADCC Submission Wrestling World Championship, losing to veteran grappler and current UFC fighter Sérgio Moraes in his ADCC debut.

=== Ultimate Fighting Championship ===
In April 2013, Neto signed a three fight deal with the Ultimate Fighting Championship. He made his UFC debut at UFC on Fuel TV: Nogueira vs. Werdum against former Strikeforce fighter Anthony Smith. He won the fight in quick fashion, finishing via a kneebar submission at 1:52 of the first round.

Neto was expected to face Derek Brunson on November 6, 2013 at UFC Fight Night 31. However, he pulled out of the bout citing an injury and was replaced by Brian Houston.

Neto faced Clint Hester on June 28, 2014 at UFC Fight Night 44. He lost the back and forth fight via split decision.

Neto was expected to face Zak Cummings on July 25, 2015 at UFC on Fox 16. However, he pulled out of the fight in early July and was replaced by promotional newcomer Dominique Steele.

After an extended hiatus, Neto faced Trevin Giles on December 9, 2017 at UFC Fight Night 123. He lost the fight via knockout in the third round.

Neto was scheduled to face Andrew Sanchez on August 25, 2018 at UFC Fight Night 135. However, he was removed from the bout on August 2 for undisclosed personal issues and replaced by Markus Perez.

Neto was scheduled to face Deron Winn on December 19, 2020 at UFC Fight Night 185. However, he was again removed from the contest due to undisclosed reasons and replaced by Antônio Arroyo.

Neto was scheduled to face Abdul Razak Alhassan on August 21, 2021 at UFC on ESPN 29. However, Neto was pulled from the event after testing positive for COVID-19. A few days later, it was announced that Neto was released by the UFC.

== Grappling career ==
Neto faced Marcus Oliveira at ADXC 7 on November 17, 2024. He lost the match by submission.

== Championships and accomplishments ==
- Ultimate Fighting Championship
  - UFC.com Awards
    - 2013: Ranked #5 Submission of the Year vs. Anthony Smith

== Mixed martial arts record ==
Professional record breakdown
13 matches	9 wins	3 losses
By knockout	1	1
By submission	7	0
By decision	1	2
No contests	1	

Res.	Record	Opponent	Method	Event	Date	Round	Time	Location	Notes
Loss	9–3 (1)	Trevin Giles	KO (punches)	UFC Fight Night: Swanson vs. Ortega	December 9, 2017	3	2:27	Fresno, California, United States	
Loss	9–2 (1)	Clint Hester	Decision (split)	UFC Fight Night: Swanson vs. Stephens	June 28, 2014	3	5:00	San Antonio, Texas, United States	
Win	9–1 (1)	Anthony Smith	Submission (kneebar)	UFC on Fuel TV: Nogueira vs. Werdum	June 8, 2013	1	1:52	Fortaleza, Brazil	
Win	8–1 (1)	Brock Larson	Submission (kneebar)	MMA Against Dengue 2	March 4, 2012	1	1:04	Rio de Janeiro, Brazil	
Win	7–1 (1)	Maiquel Falcão	Submission (kimura)	Amazon Forest Combat 1	September 14, 2011	2	4:26	Manaus, Brazil	
Win	6–1 (1)	Douglas Cristian	Submission (verbal)	Top Fighter MMA	March 6, 2010	2	N/A	Rio de Janeiro, Brazil	
NC	5–1 (1)	Rodney Glunder	No Contest (fighters fell from the ring)	Art of War 14	September 26, 2009	1	0:24	Macau, China	
Loss	5–1	Ryo Kawamura	Decision (unanimous)	World Victory Road Presents: Sengoku First Battle	March 5, 2008	3	5:00	Tokyo, Japan	
Win	5–0	Fabiano Astorino	Submission (kimura)	Fury FC 5: Final Conflict	December 6, 2007	1	2:25	São Paulo, Brazil	
Win	4–0	Renato Matos	TKO (punches)	Detonaco Fight Championship	November 20, 2007	1	4:55	Brazil	
Win	3–0	Cezar Ferreira	Decision (unanimous)	XFC: Brazil	April 29, 2007	3	5:00	Rio de Janeiro, Brazil	
Win	2–0	Eduardo Camilo	Submission (armbar)	XFC: Brazil	April 29, 2007	1	1:46	Rio de Janeiro, Brazil	
Win	1–0	Lolito Lolito	Submission (armbar)	Top Fighter MMA 2	October 25, 2006	1	N/A	Rio de Janeiro, Brazil	

== See also ==
- List of male mixed martial artists
