= Trevin Giles =

American former mixed martial arts fighter

- Born: Trevin Dewayne Giles; August 6, 1992 (age 34); San Antonio, Texas, U.S.
- Other names: The Problem
- Height: 6 ft 0 in (1.83 m)
- Weight: 170 lb (77 kg; 12 st 2 lb)
- Division: Welterweight (2022–present); Middleweight (2014–2021); Light Heavyweight (2017)
- Reach: 74 in (188 cm)
- Fighting out of: Houston, Texas, U.S.
- Team: War Training Center
- Rank: Brown belt in Brazilian Jiu-Jitsu
- Years active: 2014–present

Mixed martial arts record
- Total: 23
- Wins: 16
- By knockout: 6
- By submission: 5
- By decision: 5
- Losses: 7
- By knockout: 3
- By submission: 3
- By decision: 1

Other information
- Occupation: Police officer
- University: Texas Southern University
- Mixed martial arts record from Sherdog

Trevin Dewayne Giles (born August 6, 1992) is an American former mixed martial artist who competed in the Welterweight division of the Ultimate Fighting Championship (UFC).

== Background ==
Giles was born in San Antonio, Texas, and was a football defensive player at Alief Taylor High School in Houston, Texas. Giles started martial arts training when he was 20 years old.

== Mixed martial arts career ==
=== Early career ===
Giles started his professional MMA career in 2014, with a triangle choke submission of Angelus Raymond McFarlane. He would go on to amass a 4–0 record fighting in the Texas circuit.

He fought outside of Texas for the first time on March 25, 2015, when he was scheduled to fight Brendan Allen at Legacy FC 52. Giles beat the future UFC middleweight by rear-naked choke.

After a first-round TKO of Robert McCarthy at Caribbean UFF 10, Giles was scheduled to fight Robert McCarthy at RFA 41. Giles submitted McCarthy with a rear-naked choke in the second round.

At Legacy FC 59, Giles was scheduled to fight another future UFC middleweight in Ike Villanueva. He beat Villanueava by a third-round arm-triangle choke.

Giles headlined LFA 3 in a middleweight bout with Ryan Spann. He beat Spann by split decision, to keep his undefeated record.

=== Ultimate Fighting Championship ===
Giles made his UFC debut on July 8, 2017, against James Bochnovic at UFC 213. He won the fight via knockout in round two.

His next fight came on December 9, 2017, at UFC Fight Night: Swanson vs. Ortega against Antônio Braga Neto. He won the fight via knockout in the third round.

Giles faced Zak Cummings on May 18, 2019, at UFC Fight Night: dos Anjos vs. Lee. He lost the fight via a guillotine choke submission in the third round.

As the last fight of his rookie contract in the UFC, Giles faced Gerald Meerschaert on August 3, 2019, at UFC on ESPN 5. He lost the fight via technical submission in the third round due to a guillotine choke.

Giles was scheduled to face Antônio Arroyo on February 8, 2020, at UFC 247. However Arroyo pulled out a day before the event due to medical issues and he was replaced by James Krause. He won the back-and-forth bout via split decision. The win also earned Giles his first Fight of the Night bonus award.

Giles was expected to face Jun Yong Park on August 1, 2020, at UFC Fight Night: Brunson vs. Shahbazyan. However, Park was removed from the bout on July 23 due to alleged travel issues and was replaced by Kevin Holland. Just prior to his walkout, Giles fainted and the fight was canceled.

Giles faced Bevon Lewis on November 7, 2020, at UFC on ESPN: Santos vs. Teixeira. He won the fight via technical knockout.

Giles was scheduled to face Dricus du Plessis on March 20, 2021, at UFC on ESPN 21. However, du Plessis pulled out due to visa issues and was replaced by Roman Dolidze. He won the close bout via unanimous decision. 9 out of 17 media members awarded the decision victory to Giles.

The match between Giles and Dricus du Plessis was rescheduled and eventually took place on July 10, 2021, at UFC 264. Giles lost the fight via knockout in round two.

Giles faced Michael Morales on January 22, 2022, at UFC 270. He lost the bout via technical knockout in round one.

Giles faced Louis Cosce on September 10, 2022, at UFC Fight Night: Sandhagen vs. Song. He won the fight via unanimous decision.

Giles faced Preston Parsons on March 25, 2023, at UFC on ESPN 43. He won the fight by split decision.

Giles faced Gabriel Bonfim at UFC 291 on July 29, 2023, losing the fight via a guillotine choke submission in round one.

Giles faced Carlos Prates on February 10, 2024, at UFC Fight Night 236. He lost the bout by knockout in the second round.

Giles faced Mike Malott on November 2, 2024 at UFC Fight Night 246. He lost the fight by unanimous decision.

On short notice and replacing an injured Jeremiah Wells, Giles was scheduled to face promotional newcomer Andreas Gustafsson on May 31, 2025 in a 180 pound catchweight bout at UFC on ESPN 68. However, during the weigh-ins, the UFC announced that Gustafsson vs Giles was canceled due to a head injury. Accordingly to Gustafsson, Giles got hurt after falling in his bathroom.

On July 9, 2025, it was reported that Giles was removed from the UFC roster.

== Personal life ==
Trevin and his wife Coreyonna have a son (born 2019). Giles was a police officer, working for the Houston Police Department. Giles announced his retirement from police work in an instagram post in February 2022.

== Championships and awards ==
- Ultimate Fighting Championship
  - Fight of the Night (One time) vs. James Krause
  - UFC.com Awards
    - 2017: Ranked #10 Newcomer of the Year

== Mixed martial arts record ==
Professional record breakdown
23 matches	16 wins	7 losses
By knockout	6	3
By submission	5	3
By decision	5	1

Res.	Record	Opponent	Method	Event	Date	Round	Time	Location	Notes
Loss	16–7	Mike Malott	Decision (unanimous)	UFC Fight Night: Moreno vs. Albazi	November 2, 2024	3	5:00	Edmonton, Alberta, Canada	
Loss	16–6	Carlos Prates	KO (punch)	UFC Fight Night: Hermansson vs. Pyfer	February 10, 2024	2	4:03	Las Vegas, Nevada, United States	
Loss	16–5	Gabriel Bonfim	Submission (guillotine choke)	UFC 291	July 29, 2023	1	1:13	Salt Lake City, Utah, United States	
Win	16–4	Preston Parsons	Decision (split)	UFC on ESPN: Vera vs. Sandhagen	March 25, 2023	3	5:00	San Antonio, Texas, United States	
Win	15–4	Louis Cosce	Decision (unanimous)	UFC Fight Night: Sandhagen vs. Song	September 17, 2022	3	5:00	Las Vegas, Nevada, United States	
Loss	14–4	Michael Morales	TKO (punches)	UFC 270	January 22, 2022	1	4:06	Anaheim, California, United States	Welterweight debut.
Loss	14–3	Dricus du Plessis	KO (punches)	UFC 264	July 10, 2021	2	1:41	Las Vegas, Nevada, United States	
Win	14–2	Roman Dolidze	Decision (unanimous)	UFC on ESPN: Brunson vs. Holland	March 20, 2021	3	5:00	Las Vegas, Nevada, United States	
Win	13–2	Bevon Lewis	TKO (punches)	UFC on ESPN: Santos vs. Teixeira	November 7, 2020	3	1:26	Las Vegas, Nevada, United States	
Win	12–2	James Krause	Decision (split)	UFC 247	February 8, 2020	3	5:00	Houston, Texas, United States	Fight of the Night.
Loss	11–2	Gerald Meerschaert	Technical Submission (guillotine choke)	UFC on ESPN: Covington vs. Lawler	August 3, 2019	3	1:49	Newark, New Jersey, United States	
Loss	11–1	Zak Cummings	Submission (guillotine choke)	UFC Fight Night: dos Anjos vs. Lee	May 18, 2019	3	4:01	Rochester, New York, United States	
Win	11–0	Antônio Braga Neto	KO (punches)	UFC Fight Night: Swanson vs. Ortega	December 9, 2017	3	2:27	Fresno, California, United States	Return to Middleweight.
Win	10–0	James Bochnovic	KO (punch)	UFC 213	July 8, 2017	2	2:54	Las Vegas, Nevada, United States	Light Heavyweight debut.
Win	9–0	Ryan Spann	Decision (split)	LFA 3	February 10, 2017	3	5:00	Lake Charles, Louisiana, United States	
Win	8–0	Ike Villanueva	Submission (arm-triangle choke)	Legacy FC 59	September 16, 2016	3	1:45	Humble, Texas, United States	
Win	7–0	Josh Clark	Submission (rear-naked choke)	RFA 41	July 29, 2016	2	1:10	San Antonio, Texas, United States	
Win	6–0	Robert McCarthy	TKO (punches)	Caribbean Ultimate Fist Fighting 10	May 21, 2016	1	3:06	Port of Spain, Trinidad and Tobago	
Win	5–0	Brendan Allen	Submission (rear-naked choke)	Legacy FC 52	March 25, 2016	2	1:47	Lake Charles, Louisiana, United States	
Win	4–0	Larry Crowe	TKO (punches)	Fury FC 8	October 9, 2015	2	1:48	Humble, Texas, United States	
Win	3–0	Terrance Ferguson	TKO (punches)	Fury FC 7	July 11, 2015	1	3:18	Humble, Texas, United States	
Win	2–0	Patrick Hutton	Submission (armbar)	Legacy FC 31	June 13, 2014	1	2:11	Houston, Texas, United States	
Win	1–0	Angelus Raymond McFarlane	Submission (inverted triangle choke)	Legacy FC 27	January 31, 2014	1	1:15	Houston, Texas, United States	Middleweight debut.

== See also ==
- List of male mixed martial artists
