= Alex Morono =

American mixed martial artist

- Born: Alexander Quincy Morono; August 16, 1990 (age 36); Houston, Texas, U.S.
- Other names: The Great White
- Height: 5 ft 11 in (1.80 m)
- Weight: 170 lb (77 kg; 12 st 2 lb)
- Division: Middleweight (2014); Welterweight
- Reach: 73 in (185 cm)
- Stance: Orthodox
- Fighting out of: Houston, Texas, U.S.
- Team: Gracie Barra The Woodlands (2007–present); Fortis MMA (2018–present)
- Trainer: Sayif Saud
- Rank: 2nd degree black belt in Brazilian Jiu-Jitsu under Vinícius "Draculino" Magalhães; Black belt in Taekwondo
- Years active: 2010–present

Mixed martial arts record
- Total: 38
- Wins: 24
- By knockout: 6
- By submission: 7
- By decision: 10
- By disqualification: 1
- Losses: 13
- By knockout: 4
- By decision: 9
- No contests: 1

Other information
- Mixed martial arts record from Sherdog

Alexander Quincy Morono (born August 16, 1990) is an American professional mixed martial artist who competed in the Welterweight division of the Ultimate Fighting Championship. A professional since 2010, Morono has also fought for Legacy Fighting Championship, where he was the Welterweight Champion.

== Background ==
Morono was born and raised in Houston, Texas, alongside three brothers. Alex's parents bought him a membership to LA Boxing gym where he began training in 2007, eventually noticing a jiu-jitsu class in the premises. He went on to join the class and was instantly hooked to the discipline. Morono also holds a professional kickboxing record of 1–0. Morono also cited The Matrix as inspiration for getting into MMA.

== Mixed martial arts career ==
=== Early career ===
In 2010, Morono began competing in Legacy Fighting Championship amateur series, amassing a record of 3–0–1.

Later that same year, Morono made his professional MMA debut, winning 21 seconds into the first round by armbar.

On December 4, 2015, Morono won the Legacy Fighting Championship Welterweight Championship with a first-round guillotine choke over Derrick Krantz.

=== Ultimate Fighting Championship ===
Morono stepped in on just over a week's notice to face Kyle Noke replacing an injured Kelvin Gastelum at UFC 195. Morono was awarded a split decision victory.

Morono was expected to face James Moontasri on October 15, 2016, at UFC Fight Night 97. However, the promotion announced on October 6 that they had cancelled the event entirely. In turn, the pairing was quickly rescheduled and eventually took place on December 17, 2016, at UFC on Fox 22. Morono won the fight by unanimous decision.

Morono was expected to face Sheldon Westcott on February 4, 2017, at UFC Fight Night 104. However, Westcott pulled out of the fight in early January and was replaced by Niko Price. He lost the fight via knockout at the end of the second round; however this was later overturned to a no contest after Price tested positive for marijuana.

Morono faced Keita Nakamura on September 23, 2017, at UFC Fight Night: Saint Preux vs. Okami. He lost the fight by split decision.

Morono faced Joshua Burkman on February 18, 2018, at UFC Fight Night 126. He won the fight via a guillotine choke submission in the first round.

Morono faced Jordan Mein on July 28, 2018, at UFC on Fox 30. He lost the fight via unanimous decision. After the loss, Morono decided to change camps, joining Fortis MMA.

Morono faced Song Kenan on November 24, 2018, at UFC Fight Night 141. He won the fight via unanimous decision. The win also earned him the Fight of the Night bonus.

Morono faced Zak Ottow on March 9, 2019, at UFC on ESPN+ 4. He won the fight via verbal submission due to elbow strikes in the first round.

Morono faced Max Griffin on October 12, 2019, at UFC on ESPN+ 19. He won the fight via unanimous decision.

Morono was scheduled to face Dhiego Lima on February 8, 2020, at UFC 247. However, on January 22, 2020, Lima was forced to withdraw from the bout due to a neck injury, and he was replaced by Khaos Williams. He lost the fight via knockout in round one.

Morono faced Rhys McKee on November 14, 2020, at UFC Fight Night 182. He won the fight via unanimous decision.

As the first fight of his new multi-fight contract, Morono faced Anthony Pettis at UFC Fight Night 183 on December 19, 2020. He lost the fight via unanimous decision.

Morono faced Donald Cerrone, replacing Diego Sanchez on May 8, 2021, at UFC on ESPN 24. He won the fight via technical knockout late in the first round. This fight earned him the Performance of the Night award.

Morono faced David Zawada, replacing Sergey Khandozhko, on September 4, 2021, at UFC Fight Night 191. He won the fight via unanimous decision.

Morono faced Mickey Gall on December 4, 2021, at UFC on ESPN 31. He won the fight via unanimous decision.

Morono faced Matthew Semelsberger on July 30, 2022, at UFC 277. He won the fight by unanimous decision.

Morono faced Santiago Ponzinibbio at UFC 282 on Saturday, December 10, 2022, replacing an injured Robbie Lawler. He lost the fight via technical knockout.

Morono faced Tim Means on May 13, 2023, at UFC on ABC 4. He won the fight via a guillotine choke submission in the second round.

Morono faced Joaquin Buckley on October 7, 2023, at UFC Fight Night 229. He lost the fight via unanimous decision.

Morono faced Court McGee on April 6, 2024, at UFC Fight Night 240. He won the bout by unanimous decision.

Morono faced Niko Price in a rematch on June 1, 2024, at UFC 302. He lost the fight by unanimous decision.

Morono faced Daniel Rodriguez on October 12, 2024, at UFC Fight Night 244. He lost the fight by split decision.

Morono faced Carlos Leal Miranda on March 8, 2025, at UFC 313. He lost the fight by technical knockout in the first round.

Morono faced Daniil Donchenko on February 7, 2025, at UFC Fight Night 266. He lost the fight by unanimous decision.

On February 10, 2026, following his fourth consecutive loss, it was reported that Morono was removed from the UFC roster.

== Personal life ==
Morono and his wife Janice co-own the Gracie Barra The Woodlands gym.

== Championships and accomplishments ==
- Ultimate Fighting Championship
  - Fight of the Night (One time) vs. Kenan Song
  - Performance of the Night (One time) vs. Donald Cerrone
  - Fourth most significant strikes landed in UFC Welterweight division history (1358)
- Legacy Fighting Championship
  - LFC Welterweight Championship (one time)
- Fight Matrix
  - 2015 Most Improved Fighter of the Year

== Mixed martial arts record ==
Professional record breakdown
38 matches	24 wins	13 losses
By knockout	6	4
By submission	7	0
By decision	10	9
By disqualification	1	0
No contests	1	

Res.	Record	Opponent	Method	Event	Date	Round	Time	Location	Notes
Loss	24–13 (1)	Daniil Donchenko	Decision (unanimous)	UFC Fight Night: Bautista vs. Oliveira	February 7, 2026	3	5:00	Las Vegas, Nevada, United States	
Loss	24–12 (1)	Carlos Leal	TKO (punches)	UFC 313	March 8, 2025	1	4:16	Las Vegas, Nevada, United States	
Loss	24–11 (1)	Daniel Rodriguez	Decision (split)	UFC Fight Night: Royval vs. Taira	October 12, 2024	3	5:00	Las Vegas, Nevada, United States	
Loss	24–10 (1)	Niko Price	Decision (unanimous)	UFC 302	June 1, 2024	3	5:00	Newark, New Jersey, United States	
Win	24–9 (1)	Court McGee	Decision (unanimous)	UFC Fight Night: Allen vs. Curtis 2	April 6, 2024	3	5:00	Las Vegas, Nevada, United States	
Loss	23–9 (1)	Joaquin Buckley	Decision (unanimous)	UFC Fight Night: Dawson vs. Green	October 7, 2023	3	5:00	Las Vegas, Nevada, United States	
Win	23–8 (1)	Tim Means	Submission (guillotine choke)	UFC on ABC: Rozenstruik vs. Almeida	May 13, 2023	2	2:09	Charlotte, North Carolina, United States	
Loss	22–8 (1)	Santiago Ponzinibbio	TKO (punches)	UFC 282	December 10, 2022	3	2:29	Las Vegas, Nevada, United States	Catchweight (180 lb) bout.
Win	22–7 (1)	Matthew Semelsberger	Decision (unanimous)	UFC 277	July 30, 2022	3	5:00	Dallas, Texas, United States	
Win	21–7 (1)	Mickey Gall	Decision (unanimous)	UFC on ESPN: Font vs. Aldo	December 4, 2021	3	5:00	Las Vegas, Nevada, United States	
Win	20–7 (1)	David Zawada	Decision (unanimous)	UFC Fight Night: Brunson vs. Till	September 4, 2021	3	5:00	Las Vegas, Nevada, United States	
Win	19–7 (1)	Donald Cerrone	TKO (punches)	UFC on ESPN: Rodriguez vs. Waterson	May 8, 2021	1	4:40	Las Vegas, Nevada, United States	Performance of the Night.
Loss	18–7 (1)	Anthony Pettis	Decision (unanimous)	UFC Fight Night: Thompson vs. Neal	December 19, 2020	3	5:00	Las Vegas, Nevada, United States	
Win	18–6 (1)	Rhys McKee	Decision (unanimous)	UFC Fight Night: Felder vs. dos Anjos	November 14, 2020	3	5:00	Las Vegas, Nevada, United States	
Loss	17–6 (1)	Khaos Williams	KO (punches)	UFC 247	February 8, 2020	1	0:27	Houston, Texas, United States	
Win	17–5 (1)	Max Griffin	Decision (unanimous)	UFC Fight Night: Joanna vs. Waterson	October 12, 2019	3	5:00	Tampa, Florida, United States	
Win	16–5 (1)	Zak Ottow	TKO (submission to elbows)	UFC Fight Night: Lewis vs. dos Santos	March 9, 2019	1	3:34	Wichita, Kansas, United States	
Win	15–5 (1)	Song Kenan	Decision (unanimous)	UFC Fight Night: Blaydes vs. Ngannou 2	November 24, 2018	3	5:00	Beijing, China	Fight of the Night.
Loss	14–5 (1)	Jordan Mein	Decision (unanimous)	UFC on Fox: Alvarez vs. Poirier 2	July 28, 2018	3	5:00	Calgary, Alberta, Canada	
Win	14–4 (1)	Josh Burkman	Submission (guillotine choke)	UFC Fight Night: Cowboy vs. Medeiros	February 18, 2018	1	2:12	Austin, Texas, United States	
Loss	13–4 (1)	Keita Nakamura	Decision (split)	UFC Fight Night: Saint Preux vs. Okami	September 23, 2017	3	5:00	Saitama, Japan	
NC	13–3 (1)	Niko Price	NC (overturned)	UFC Fight Night: Bermudez vs. The Korean Zombie	February 4, 2017	2	5:00	Houston, Texas, United States	Originally a KO (punch) win for Price; overturned after he tested positive for marijuana.
Win	13–3	James Moontasri	Decision (unanimous)	UFC on Fox: VanZant vs. Waterson	December 17, 2016	3	5:00	Sacramento, California, United States	
Win	12–3	Kyle Noke	Decision (split)	UFC 195	January 2, 2016	3	5:00	Las Vegas, Nevada, United States	
Win	11–3	Derrick Krantz	Submission (guillotine choke)	Legacy FC 49	December 4, 2015	1	4:29	Bossier City, Louisiana, United States	Won the LFC Welterweight Championship.
Win	10–3	Valdir Araújo	KO (punch)	Legacy FC 44	August 28, 2015	3	2:18	Houston, Texas, United States	Return to Welterweight.
Win	9–3	Marcus Andrusia	TKO (punches and elbows)	Legacy FC 42	June 26, 2015	1	3:18	Lake Charles, Louisiana, United States	Catchweight (180 lb) bout.
Win	8–3	Rashid Abdullah	Submission (triangle choke)	Fury Fighting 4	February 13, 2015	1	1:36	Humble, Texas, United States	Catchweight (175 lb) bout.
Win	7–3	Larry Hopkins	TKO (punches)	Fury Fighting 2	October 24, 2014	1	0:44	Humble, Texas, United States	Middleweight debut.
Loss	6–3	Diego Henrique da Silva	TKO (punches)	Legacy FC 31	June 13, 2014	1	1:55	Houston, Texas, United States	
Win	6–2	Rashid Abdullah	DQ (biting)	Texas City Throwdown 1	March 14, 2014	3	0:10	Texas City, Texas, United States	
Loss	5–2	Rob Wood	Decision (split)	Fury Fighting 1	November 1, 2013	3	5:00	Humble, Texas, United States	
Win	5–1	Brandon Farran	Submission (armbar)	Legacy FC 18	March 1, 2013	1	1:16	Houston, Texas, United States	
Win	4–1	Rashon Lewis	TKO (punches)	Legacy FC 10	February 24, 2012	1	4:02	Houston, Texas, United States	
Win	3–1	Evert Gutierrez	Decision (unanimous)	Legacy FC 8	September 16, 2011	3	3:00	Houston, Texas, United States	
Loss	2–1	Jeff Rexroad	Decision (split)	Legacy FC 6	April 9, 2011	3	3:00	Houston, Texas, United States	
Win	2–0	Mark Garcia	Submission (armbar)	Legacy FC 5	January 29, 2011	1	0:41	Houston, Texas, United States	
Win	1–0	Jose Castro	Submission (armbar)	Triple A Promotions: Border Fight Fest 1	December 2, 2010	1	0:21	Laredo, Texas, United States	

== See also ==
- List of male mixed martial artists
