= İbrahimoğlu =

Origin
- Language: Turkish from Arabic
- Meaning: son of Ibrahim
- Region of origin: Turkey

Other names
- See also: Brahimaj, Ibrahimović

İbrahimoğlu or Ibrahimoghlu is a Turkish and Azerbaijani surname. Its literal meaning of "descendant of Ibrahim" is similar to that of the Bosnian surname Ibrahimović and the Albanian family name Brahimaj and it strongly indicates Muslim religious affiliation of its bearer. People with the name include:

- Adem İbrahimoğlu (born 1957), former Turkish football player
- İlqar İbrahimoğlu (born 1973), Azerbaijani religious leader
- İsmet İbrahimoğlu (1943–1988), Turkish chess player
- Melih İbrahimoğlu (born 2000), footballer
- Rafet İbrahimoğlu (1931–2012), Turkish politician
- Vaqif İbrahimoğlu (1949–2011), Azerbaijani actor and theater director
