= Brahimaj =

Origin
- Language: Albanian via Turkish from Arabic
- Meaning: son of Ibrahim
- Region of origin: Albania

Other names
- See also: İbrahimoğlu, Ibrahimović

Brahimaj is an Albanian surname. Its literal meaning is "son of Brahim/Ibrahim", which is similar to that of the Bosnian surname Ibrahimović and the Turkish family name İbrahimoğlu and may indicate Muslim religious affiliation of its bearer. Notable people with the name include:

- Ahmet Brahimaj, Kosovar politician
- Brixhild Brahimaj (born 1995), Albanian footballer
- Edmond Brahimaj (born 1959), Albanian religious leader
- Lahi Brahimaj (born 1970), Kosovo Liberation Army (KLA) commander
- Ramiz Brahimaj (born 1992), American mixed martial artist
