= Mohammad Ibrahim =

Mohammad, Mohammed, or Mohamed Ibrahim may refer to:

== Sportspeople ==
- Mohammed Ibrahim (basketball), (born 1983), Lebanese professional basketball player
- Mohamed Ibrahim (weightlifter, born 1987) (Mohamed Abdeltawwab Ibrahim Abdelbaki; born 1987), Egyptian weightlifter
- Mohamed Ibrahim (snooker player), (born 1990), Egyptian snooker player
- Mohammad Ibrahim (cricketer) (born 1998), Afghan cricketer
- Mohamed Ibrahim (diver), Egyptian Olympic diver
- Muhammad Ibrahim (footballer, born 1962), former Kuwaiti footballer and coach
- Mohamed Ibrahim (footballer, born 1985), Egyptian footballer
- Mohamed Ibrahim (footballer, born 1992), Egyptian footballer
- Mohammad Ibrahim (footballer, born 1997), Bangladeshi footballer
- Mohamed Ibrahim (gymnast) (born 1942), Egyptian gymnast
- Mohamed Mahmoud Ibrahim (born 1937), Egyptian Olympic weightlifter
- Mohamed Ibrahim (American football) (born 1998), American football player
- Mohammed Ibrahim Eid (born 1991), Emirati footballer
- Mohamed Ibrahim El-Sayed (born 1998), Egyptian Greco-Roman wrestler

== Others ==
- Asad Khan, 17th-18th century Mughal noble with the birth name Muhammad Ibrahim
- Muhammad Ibrahim (Mughal emperor) (1703–1746), Mughal Emperor
- Muhammad Ibrahim (justice) (1894–1966), Bengali justice and academic
- Muhammad Ibrahim (1911–1989), Bangladeshi physician, founder of BIRDEM
- Muhammad Ibrahim, 20th-century Bengali scholar and politician
- Mohamed Ibrahim Warsame (1943–2022), Somali poet and songwriter
- Muhammad Ibrahim (academic) (born 1945), Bangladeshi academic
- Mohammad Ibrahim Arman Loni (1983–2019), Pashtun human rights activist
- Mohamed Mohamud Ibrahim (born 1946 or 1947), deputy Prime Minister of Somalia 2011-
- Mo Ibrahim (born 1946), British telecommunications tycoon
- Mohamed Youssef Ibrahim (born 1947), former Egyptian Interior Minister
- Mohamed Ibrahim Moustafa (born 1953), Egyptian Interior Minister from January 2013 to March 2015
- Muhammad Ibrahim (actor) (born 1955), Lebanese actor, television presenter and voice actor
- Mohammed Ibrahim (renegade Taliban leader) (died 2006), defected from the Taliban in 2006, dying of chronic liver disease shortly afterwards
- Muhammad Ibrahim (banker) (born 1960), governor of the Central Bank of Malaysia
- Mohammed Zaher Ibrahim (born 2009), Palestinian-American detained by Israel

== See also ==
- Mohammad Ibrahim Khan (disambiguation)
- Mohammed Ibrahim Makwai, an alias for Saif al-Adel, senior member of the al Qaeda leadership, sometimes described as al Qaeda's military chief
