= Ibrahim (name) =

Ibrahim إبراهيم
- Pronunciation: Arabic: [ʔɪbraːˈhiːm]
- Gender: Male

Origin
- Origin: Arabic
- Meaning: Equivalent to ‘Abraham’ in Hebrew meaning "Father of many".
- Region of origin: Arabs

Other names
- Alternative spelling: Ibraheem, Ebrahim, Ebraheem

Ibrahim (Arabic: إبراهيم, Ibrāhīm; also anglicized as Ibraheem) is the Arabic name of Abraham, the common Hebrew patriarch of the Abrahamic religions, including Judaism, Christianity, and Islam. It is a common male first name and surname among Muslims and Arab Christians, a derivative of the name Abraham or Avram in Judaism and Christianity in the Middle East. It likely indicates a Jewish origin when it is used as a surname.

As a surname it was a common indicator of Jewish origin prior to the exodus of the mizrahi population in Arabic speaking countries to Israel. This surname in the Arabic speaking countries today can indicate Jewish origin – and potential conversion to Christianity/Islam at some point.

In the Levant and Maghreb, Brahim and Barhoum are common diminutives for the first name Ibrahim.

== Given name ==
=== Ibrahim ===
- Ibrahim "Baim" Wong (born 1981), Indonesian artist
- Ibrahim (1615–1648), Ottoman sultan
- Ibrahim Abatcha (1938–1968), Chadian politician
- Ibrahim Abboud (1900–1983), President of Sudan (1958–1964)
- Ibrahim Abouleish (1937–2017), Egyptian scientist
- Ibrahim Abu el-Hawa (born 1942), Palestinian peace activist
- Ibrahim Abu-Lughod (1929–2001), Palestinian academic
- Ibrahim Afellay (born 1986), Dutch footballer
- Ibrahim Ahmad (1914–2000), Kurdish politician
- Ibrahim Al Hilbawi (1858–1940), Egyptian jurist and politician
- Ibrahim al-Jaafari (born 1947), Iraqi politician
- Ibrahim Al-Mudhaf (1852–1928), Kuwaiti politician
- Ibrahim Al-Shahrani (born 1974), Saudi Arabian footballer
- Ibrahim al-Yaziji (1847–1906), Lebanese writer
- Ibrahim Alemi, Iranian politician
- Ibrahim Ali Tashna (1872–1931), Bengali poet and Islamic scholar
- Ibrahim Arman Loni, known as Arman Loni (1983–2019), Pashtun human rights activist
- Ibrahim Artan Ismail, Somali politician, former Minister of Security of Puntland
- Ibrahim Awal (born 1990), Qatari footballer
- Ibrahim Ba (born 1973), Senegalese-French footballer
- Ibrahim Babangida (born 1941), 8th President of Nigeria
- İbrahim Balaban (1921–2019), Turkish painter
- Ibrahim Benli (born 1979), Danish politician
- Ibrahim Benoh, Jordanian-born American artist and educator
- Ibrahim Bey (Mamluk) (1735–1833), Egyptian Mamluk chieftain of Georgian origin
- Ibrahim Bilali (born 1965), Kenyan boxer
- Ibrahim Böhme (1944–1999), German politician
- Ibrahim Chaibou (born 1966), Nigerien referee
- Ibrahim Dadashov (1926–1990), Soviet wrestler
- Ibrahim Deif (born 1962), Egyptian academic
- Ibrahim Fazeel (born 1980), Maldivian footballer
- Ibrahim Ferrer (1927–2005), Afro-Cuban singer
- Ibrahim Ghosheh (1936–2021), Palestinian civil engineer and politician
- Ibrahim Haddad (born 1938), Syrian politician
- Ibrahim Halidi (1954–2020), Prime Minister of Comoros
- Ibrahim Hashem (1878–1958), Jordanian lawyer and politician
- Ibrahim Heski (died 1931), Kurdish politician
- Ibrahim Hussein (disambiguation)
- Ibrahim I of Shirvan (died 1417), ruler of Shirvan from the Derbendid dynasty
- Ibrahim ibn al-Mahdi (779–839), an Abbasid prince, singer, composer and poet. He was the son of the third Abbasid caliph Al-Mahdi.
- Ibrahim ibn al-Walid (died 750), the Umayyad caliph from 4 Oct to 4 Dec 744.
- Ibrahim ibn Jaʿfar or Al-Muttaqi (908–968), Caliph of Baghdad during Later Abbasid period
- Ibrahim ibn Muhammad (630–632), the third son of the Islamic prophet Muhammad.
- Ibrahim ibn Muhammad Al ash-Sheikh (1920–2006), former minister of justice of Saudi Arabia
- Ibrahim ibn Salih (died 792), Abbasid governor of various provinces in Syria and Egypt in the late eighth century.
- Ibrahim ibn Yuhanna, Byzantine translator and author
- Ibrahim Isaac Sidrak (born 1955), Patriarch of Alexandria
- Ibrahim Ismail Chundrigar (1897–1960), Pakistani politician
- Ibrahim Kanaan (born 1962), Lebanese Politician
- Ibrahim Kargbo (born 1982), Sierra Leonean footballer
- Ibrahim Lodhi (1480–1526), the Sultan of the Lodi Empire from 1517 to 21 April 1526.
- Ibrahim Maalouf (born 1980), Lebanese jazz musician
- Ibrahim Masod, Singaporean convicted murderer
- Ibrahim Meraachli (1937–2004), Lebanese actor
- Ibrahim Mohamed (1965–2002), Singaporean murderer
- Ibrahim Muhammad Dodo (born 1999), American rapper
- Ibrahim Murtala Muhammed (1974–2025), Ghanaian politician
- Ibrahim Musa (1986–2025), Nigerian politician
- Ibrahim Muteferrika (1674–1745), Ottoman diplomat, printer, and polymath
- Ibrahim Nagi (1898–1953), Egyptian poet
- Ibrahim Najjar (born 1941), Lebanese politician
- Ibrahim Nasir (1926–2008), Maldivian politician
- Ibrahim Nasrallah (born 1954), Palestinian poet
- Ibrahim Nazil, Maldivian politician
- Ibrahim Nooraddeen (died 1892), Sultan of the Maldives
- Ibrahim of Johor (1873–1959), Sultan of Johor, Malaysia
- Ibrahim of Kazan, ruler of Kazan Khanate
- Ibrahim Orabi (1912–1957), Egyptian wrestler
- Ibrahim Pasha (disambiguation), several pashas named Ibrahim
- Ibrahim Rabimov (born 1987), Tajikistani footballer
- Ibrahim Rabiu (born 1991), Nigerian footballer
- Ibrahim Said (footballer, born 1979) (born 1979), Egyptian footballer
- Ibrahim Said (footballer, born 2002) (born 2002), Nigerian footballer
- Ibrahim Sanjaya (born 1997), Indonesian footballer
- Ibrahim Shoukry (1916–2008), Egyptian politician
- Ibrahim Sirkeci (born 1972), Turkish management scientist
- Ibrahim Sylla (1956–2013), Senegalese record producer
- Ibrahim Tounkara (born 1976), Canadian football player
- Ibrahim Traoré (born 1988), Burkinabé military officer
- Ibrahim Ujani (1863–1943), Bengali qari and teacher
- Ibrahim Ustavdić (1878–1974), Bosnian educator
- Ibrahim Yattara (born 1980), Guinean footballer
- Ibrahim Yetim (born 1965), German politician
- Ibrahim Zarman (born 1997), Indonesian taekwondo practitioner
- Ibrahim Zeid Keilani (1937–2013), Jordanian politician

=== İbrahim ===
- İbrahim Akın (footballer) (born 1984), Turkish footballer
- İbrahim Arat (born 1988), Turkish weightlifter
- İbrahim Aydemir (born 1983), Turkish footballer
- İbrahim Aydın or Cihangirzade İbrahim Bey (1874–1948), Turkish military officer and statesman
- İbrahim Bölükbaşı (born 1990), Turkish wrestler
- İbrahim Kafesoğlu (1914–1984), Turkish historian and academic
- İbrahim Kaş (born 1986), Turkish footballer
- İbrahim Öztürk (born 1981), Turkish footballer
- İbrahim Şahin (footballer) (born 1984), Turkish footballer
- İbrahim Tataroğlu (born 2006), Turkish Olympian judoka
- İbrahim Tatlıses (born 1952), Turkish folk singer of Kurdish origin
- İbrahim Toraman (born 1981), Turkish footballer
- İbrahim Üzülmez (born 1974), Turkish footballer

=== Ebrahim ===
- Ebrahim Afshar (1725–1749), king of Iran
- Ebrahim Alkazi (1925–2020), Indian theatre director and drama teacher
- Ebrahim Mirzapour (born 1978), Iranian football goalkeeper
- Ebrahim Moradi (c.1899–1977), Iranian filmmaker
- Ebrahim Nabavi (1958–2025), Iranian satirist and writer
- Ebrahim Raisi (1960–2024), President of Iran
- Ebrahim Rasool (born 1962), Premier of the Western Cape province in South Africa

=== Ibraheem ===
- Ibraheem Samirah (born 1991), American politician and member of the Virginia House of Delegates

== Middle name ==
=== Ibrahim ===
- Muhammad ibn Ibrahim Al ash-Sheikh (1890–1969), first Grand Mufti of Saudi Arabia
- Muhammad ibn Ismail ibn Ibrahim al-Bukhari (810–870), Persian muhaddith

== Surname or patronymic ==
=== Ibrahim ===
- Abdisalam Ibrahim (born 1991), Somali born Norwegian footballer
- Abdullah Ibrahim (1934–2026), South African pianist and composer
- Abu el-Qassim Mohamad Ibrahim (1937–2022), Sudanese politician
- Ammar Ibrahim (born 1996), Qatari sprinter
- Andrew Ibrahim (born 1989), English student convicted of "preparing terrorist acts"
- Anwar Ibrahim (born 1947), Prime Minister of Malaysia
- Dawood Ibrahim (born 1955), Indian mobster
- Deren Ibrahim (born 1991), Gibraltarian footballer
- Fauziah Ibrahim, Australian broadcast journalist
- George Ibrahim (1964–2003), Pakistani Roman Catholic priest
- Gihan Ibrahim (born 1986/1987), Egyptian activist and citizen journalist
- Hanan Ibrahim, Somali activist
- Hassan Ibrahim (1917–1990), Egyptian military officer and politician
- Ibrahim Namo Ibrahim (born 1937), Chaldean Catholic bishop in the United States
- Ife Ibrahim (born 2008), English footballer
- Indra Wijaya Ibrahim, Singaporean convicted murderer
- Jamaludin Ibrahim, Singaporean convicted killer
- John Ibrahim (born 1970), Lebanese-Australian nightclub entrepreneur
- Kamal Ibrahim (wrestler) (born 1961), Egyptian Olympic wrestler
- Kamala Ibrahim (born 1939), Sudanese artist
- Keria Ibrahim (born 1973), Ethiopian politician
- Khalil Ibrahim (1957–2011), Sudanese Islamist
- Mohammad Ibrahim (disambiguation), multiple people
- Moussa Ibrahim (born 1974), Libyan political figure
- Muhammad Ibrahim (1911–1989), Bangladeshi physician
- Muhammad Ibrahim (justice) (1894–1966), Bengali justice and academic
- Muhammad Ibrahim (scholar), Bengali politician
- Musa Ibrahim (born 1979), Bangladeshi mountaineer
- Nebil Ibrahim (born 2000), Swedish boxer
- Raymond Ibrahim (born 1973), Coptic American research librarian, translator, author and columnist with focus in Arab history and language
- Sarimah Ibrahim (born 1978), Malaysian television host, actress and singer
- Sonallah Ibrahim (1937–2025), Egyptian novelist and short story writer
- Waleed bin Ibrahim Al Ibrahim (born 1962), Saudi Arabian businessman
- Yaacob Ibrahim (born 1955), Minister for Communications and Information, Minister in charge of Muslim Affairs and the Minister in charge of Cyber Security of Singapore

=== Ebrahim ===
- Abul Fadl Mohsin Ebrahim, Seychellois Islamic scholar
- Armaan Ebrahim (born 1989), Indian car racer
- Chit Lwin Ebrahim (born 1946), Rohingya lawyer and politician
- Currimbhoy Ebrahim (1839–1924), Indian businessman
- Dion Ebrahim (born 1980), Zimbabwean cricketer
- Fakhruddin G. Ebrahim (1928–2020), Pakistani judge
- Fareed Ebrahim (born 1998), Qatari born-Egyptian footballer
- Ismail Ebrahim (1946–2020), South African cricketer
- Kate Ebrahim (born 1991), New Zealand cricketer
- M. M. Ebrahim (1896–1957), Sri Lankan politician
- Murad Ebrahim (born 1949), Filipino politician
- Omar Ebrahim (born 1956), English baritone vocalist
- Roshanara Ebrahim (born 1993), Kenyan TV host, model, author and beauty pageant titleholder
- Vincent Ebrahim (born 1949), South African actor and comedian
- Vinette Ebrahim (born 1957), South African actress and playwright
