= Ebraheim =

Ebraheim may refer to:

- Ibrahim (name), a common male first name and surname among Muslims and Arab Christians
- Ebra, a character on the TV show The Bear
