= Sean Brady (fighter) =

American mixed martial artist (born 1992)

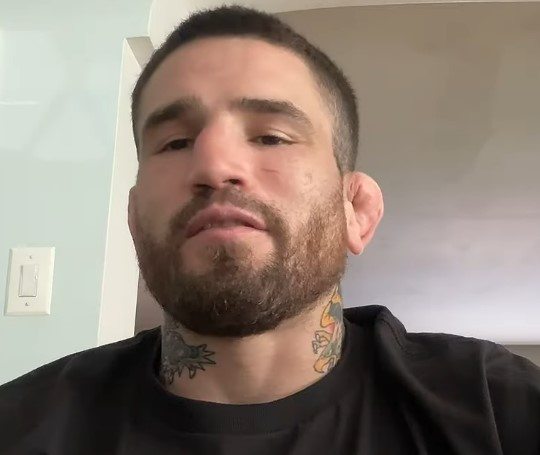
- Brady in 2023
- Born: Sean Thomas Brady; November 23, 1992 (age 33); Philadelphia, Pennsylvania, U.S.
- Height: 5 ft 9 in (175 cm)
- Weight: 170 lb (77 kg; 12 st 2 lb)
- Division: Welterweight
- Reach: 72 in (183 cm)
- Stance: Orthodox
- Fighting out of: Philadelphia, Pennsylvania, U.S.
- Team: Semper Fi MMA (formerly); Renzo Gracie Philly
- Rank: Black belt in Brazilian Jiu-Jitsu under Daniel Gracie
- Years active: 2014–present

Mixed martial arts record
- Total: 21
- Wins: 19
- By knockout: 3
- By submission: 6
- By decision: 10
- Losses: 2
- By knockout: 2

Other information
- Mixed martial arts record from Sherdog

Sean Thomas Brady (born November 23, 1992) is an American professional mixed martial artist who currently competes in the Welterweight division of the Ultimate Fighting Championship. As of June 20, 2026, he is #5 in the Meta UFC welterweight rankings.

== Background ==
Brady was raised in Burholme, Philadelphia. While studying at Swenson Arts and Technology High School to become an auto mechanic, Brady started training Muay Thai, subsequently also picking up Brazilian jiu-jitsu.

== Mixed martial arts career ==
=== Early career ===
Spending most of his time in the Cage Fury Fighting Championship, Brady compiled an undefeated 10–0 pro record. Along the way, Brady captured the Welterweight title with a submission win over Mike Jones. Brady then defended his 170-pound championship with a fourth-round knockout over Taj Abdul-Hakim. After this performance, he was given a UFC contract.

=== Ultimate Fighting Championship ===
In his UFC debut, Brady faced Court McGee on October 18, 2019, at UFC on ESPN 6. He won the fight via a unanimous decision.

Brady faced Ismail Naurdiev on February 29, 2020, at UFC Fight Night 169. He won the fight via unanimous decision.

Brady faced Christian Aguilera at UFC Fight Night 175 on August 29, 2020. He won the fight via a guillotine choke in round two. This win earned him the Performance of the Night award.

Brady was expected to face Belal Muhammad on December 19, 2020, at UFC Fight Night 185. However in late October, Brady had a broken nose and had to pull out of their bout.

Brady faced Jake Matthews on March 6, 2021, at UFC 259. He won the fight via a submission in round three.

Brady was scheduled to face Kevin Lee on July 10, 2021, at UFC 264. However, Lee withdrew due to injury and the bout was rescheduled to UFC on ESPN 30 on August 28, 2021. Subsequently, the bout was yet again cancelled after Brady withdrew due to a foot infection.

Brady faced Michael Chiesa on November 20, 2021, at UFC Fight Night 198. He won the bout via unanimous decision.

Brady faced Belal Muhammad on October 22, 2022, at UFC 280. He lost the bout via TKO stoppage at the end of the second round.

Brady was scheduled to face Michel Pereira on March 25, 2023, at UFC on ESPN 43. However, Brady pulled out in mid-February due to a torn groin and the bout was scrapped.

Brady was expected to face Jack Della Maddalena at UFC 290 on July 8, 2023. However, on June 30, Brady withdrew from the bout due to an undisclosed injury.

Brady faced Kelvin Gastelum on December 2, 2023, at UFC on ESPN 52. He won the fight by a third-round kimura submission. This fight earned him the Performance of the Night award.

Brady was scheduled to face Vicente Luque on March 30, 2024, at UFC Fight Night 241. However, Brady indicated he never signed a bout agreement due to dealing with an injury, and was replaced by Joaquin Buckley.

Brady faced Gilbert Burns in the main event on September 7, 2024 at UFC Fight Night 242. He won the fight by unanimous decision.

Brady replaced Jack Della Maddalena and faced former UFC Welterweight champion Leon Edwards on March 22, 2025, at UFC Fight Night 255. After dominating the majority of the bout on the ground, he won the fight via a guillotine choke submission in the fourth round. This fight earned him another Performance of the Night award.

Brady faced Michael Morales on November 15, 2025 at UFC 322. He lost the fight via technical knockout in the first round.

Brady was scheduled to face Joaquin Buckley on April 25, 2026 in the main event at UFC Fight Night 274. However, the bout was moved to UFC 328 on May 9, 2026 for undisclosed reasons. He won the fight by unanimous decision.

Brady was scheduled to face Gabriel Bonfim in the main event on November 7, 2026 at UFC Fight Night 293. However, on October 29, the bout was cancelled after Brady withdrew due to a staph infection in his knee. The bout has been re-scheduled and will take place on January 23, 2027 at UFC Fight Night 297 as the main event.

== Professional grappling career ==
Brady faced two-time ADCC Submission Fighting World Championship silver medallist Craig Jones at Fury Pro Grappling 3 on December 30, 2021, and won the match by unanimous decision.

Brady faced UFC veteran and 10th Planet Jiu-Jitsu black belt Ben Saunders in the main event of Fury Pro Grappling 4 on May 28, 2022, and submitted him with a kimura at 4:25.

Brady competed against Richie Martinez in the main event of Fury Pro Grappling 12 on December 28, 2024. He won the match by submission.

== Championships and accomplishments ==
- Ultimate Fighting Championship
  - Performance of the Night (Three times) vs. Christian Aguilera, Kelvin Gastelum and Leon Edwards
- MMAjunkie.com
  - 2020 August Submission of the Month vs. Christian Aguilera
- MMA Fighting
  - 2025 #4 Ranked Submission of the Year vs. Leon Edwards at UFC Fight Night: Edwards vs. Brady
- Cage Fury Fighting Championships
  - Cage Fury FC Welterweight Championship (One Time)
    - Two successful title defenses

== Mixed martial arts record ==
Professional record breakdown
21 matches	19 wins	2 losses
By knockout	3	2
By submission	6	0
By decision	10	0

Res.	Record	Opponent	Method	Event	Date	Round	Time	Location	Notes
Win	19–2	Joaquin Buckley	Decision (unanimous)	UFC 328	May 9, 2026	3	5:00	Newark, New Jersey, United States	
Loss	18–2	Michael Morales	TKO (punches)	UFC 322	November 15, 2025	1	3:27	New York City, New York, United States	
Win	18–1	Leon Edwards	Submission (guillotine choke)	UFC Fight Night: Edwards vs. Brady	March 22, 2025	4	1:39	London, England	Performance of the Night.
Win	17–1	Gilbert Burns	Decision (unanimous)	UFC Fight Night: Burns vs. Brady	September 7, 2024	5	5:00	Las Vegas, Nevada, United States	
Win	16–1	Kelvin Gastelum	Submission (kimura)	UFC on ESPN: Dariush vs. Tsarukyan	December 2, 2023	3	1:43	Austin, Texas, United States	Performance of the Night.
Loss	15–1	Belal Muhammad	TKO (punches)	UFC 280	October 22, 2022	2	4:47	Abu Dhabi, United Arab Emirates	
Win	15–0	Michael Chiesa	Decision (unanimous)	UFC Fight Night: Vieira vs. Tate	November 20, 2021	3	5:00	Las Vegas, Nevada, United States	
Win	14–0	Jake Matthews	Submission (arm-triangle choke)	UFC 259	March 6, 2021	3	3:28	Las Vegas, Nevada, United States	
Win	13–0	Christian Aguilera	Technical Submission (guillotine choke)	UFC Fight Night: Smith vs. Rakić	August 29, 2020	2	1:47	Las Vegas, Nevada, United States	Performance of the Night.
Win	12–0	Ismail Naurdiev	Decision (unanimous)	UFC Fight Night: Benavidez vs. Figueiredo	February 29, 2020	3	5:00	Norfolk, Virginia, United States	
Win	11–0	Court McGee	Decision (unanimous)	UFC on ESPN: Reyes vs. Weidman	October 18, 2019	3	5:00	Boston, Massachusetts, United States	
Win	10–0	Tajuddin Abdul Hakim	TKO (punches)	Cage Fury FC 72	February 16, 2019	4	3:36	Atlantic City, New Jersey, United States	Defended the Cage Fury FC Welterweight Championship.
Win	9–0	Gilbert Urbina	Decision (unanimous)	LFA 49	September 14, 2018	3	5:00	Atlantic City, New Jersey, United States	
Win	8–0	Colton Smith	Decision (unanimous)	Shogun Fights: Florida	March 17, 2018	3	5:00	Hollywood, Florida, United States	
Win	7–0	Mike Jones	Submission (rear-naked choke)	Cage Fury FC 68	October 21, 2017	2	1:31	Atlantic City, New Jersey, United States	Defended the Cage Fury FC Welterweight Championship.
Win	6–0	Tanner Saraceno	Submission (guillotine choke)	Cage Fury FC 65	May 20, 2017	1	3:36	Philadelphia, Pennsylvania, United States	Won the vacant Cage Fury FC Welterweight Championship.
Win	5–0	Chauncey Foxworth	KO (spinning backfist)	Cage Fury FC 60	August 6, 2016	1	0:57	Atlantic City, New Jersey, United States	
Win	4–0	Rocky Edwards	Decision (unanimous)	Cage Fury FC 56	February 27, 2016	3	5:00	Philadelphia, Pennsylvania, United States	
Win	3–0	Aaron Jeffery	Decision (unanimous)	Cage Fury FC 53	December 4, 2015	3	5:00	Philadelphia, Pennsylvania, United States	
Win	2–0	Jake Gombocz	Decision (unanimous)	Cage Fury FC 48	May 9, 2015	3	5:00	Atlantic City, New Jersey, United States	Welterweight debut.
Win	1–0	Paul Almquist	TKO (punches)	Cage Fury FC 38	August 9, 2014	1	0:33	Atlantic City, New Jersey, United States	Lightweight debut.

== See also ==
- List of current UFC fighters
- List of male mixed martial artists
