= Ibrahimović (surname) =

Ibrahimović is a Bosnian surname derived from the masculine given name Ibrahim (meaning "son of Ibrahim"), the Arabic name of the prophet and patriarch Abraham. Notable people with the name include:

- Arijon Ibrahimović (born 2005), German footballer
- Edin Ibrahimović (born 1991), Austrian footballer
- Edin Ibrahimovic (born 1998), Austrian volleyball player
- Ervin Ibrahimović (born 1972), Montenegrin politician, vice president of the Parliament of Montenegro and president of Bosniak Party
- Haris Ibrahimovic (born 1998), Finnish footballer
- Miralem Ibrahimović (born 1963), Bosnian footballer
- Maximilian Ibrahimović (born 2006), Swedish footballer, son of Zlatan
- Nedžad Ibrahimović (born 1958), Bosnian writer, literary and film critic, screenwriter and documentarian
- Sanel Ibrahimović (born 1987), Bosnian footballer
- Zlatan Ibrahimović (born 1981), Swedish footballer
