= Carlston Harris =

Guyanese mixed martial arts fighter

- Born: Carlston Lindsay Harris; July 9, 1987 (age 39); Skeldon, Guyana
- Other names: Moçambique
- Height: 6 ft 0 in (1.83 m)
- Weight: 170 lb (77 kg; 12 st 2 lb)
- Division: Welterweight
- Reach: 76 in (193 cm)
- Fighting out of: Rio de Janeiro, Brazil
- Team: Renovação Fight Team
- Rank: Black belt in luta livre under Marcio "Cromado" Ramos Barbosa; Brown belt in Brazilian jiu-jitsu
- Years active: 2011–present

Mixed martial arts record
- Total: 27
- Wins: 19
- By knockout: 5
- By submission: 6
- By decision: 8
- Losses: 8
- By knockout: 4
- By decision: 4

Other information
- Mixed martial arts record from Sherdog

Carlston Lindsay Harris (born July 9, 1987) is a Guyanese mixed martial artist who competed in the Welterweight division of the Ultimate Fighting Championship.

== Background ==
Having left Guyana in 2007 in search of better job prospects, Harris moved to Manaus, Brazil, working as a mechanic. Treating boxing and luta livre as a hobby, he decided to make martial arts his full-time job after buying a pirated DVD of the first B.J. Penn and Diego Sanchez bout. Soon after, his coach, Junior Lopes, suggested that Harris move to Rio de Janeiro and continue his training at Renovação Fight Team (RFT) under Marcio "Cromado" Ramos Barbosa.

He is the first Guyanese fighter in the UFC.

== Mixed martial arts career ==
=== Early career ===
Making his MMA debut in 2011, Harris started his MMA career losing a split decision to Christiano Marques. Two months later, Harris scored his first MMA victory submitting Bruno Renascer in the first round, followed by another decision loss in March 2012. Turning his career around, he put on a winning streak after his 1–2 start and defeated the likes of Michel Pereira, Joilton Lutterbach, and Wellington Turman to get noticed by Brave Combat Federation.

=== Brave Combat Federation ===
Making his debut on the Brave CF 3 card on March 18, 2017, against Thiago Vieira, Harris won the bout via TKO stoppage in the second round.

In his sophomore performance, Harris would go on to defeat Carl Booth via unanimous decision at Brave CF 8 on August 12, 2017, to win the BRAVE CF Welterweight Championship.

In his first defence off the title, Harris faced Jarrah Hussein Al-Silawi at Brave CF 16 on September 21, 2018. He lost the bout and the title via TKO in the first round.

=== Return to regional scene ===
Winning his first bout back in Brazil with the promotion Shooto Brazil against Claudio Rocha via stoppage in the first round. Harris faced Alex Santos at Shooto Brazil 101 on September 27, 2020, Harris winning the bout after knocking out his opponent in the second round.

After his victory against Saygid Izagakhmaev at UAE Warriors 15 with Dana White in attendance, he was signed by the UFC.

=== Ultimate Fighting Championship ===
Harris made his UFC debut against Christian Aguilera on May 8, 2021, at UFC on ESPN 24. He won the bout via technical submission due to an anaconda choke as he choked Aguilera in the first round. This fight earned him the Performance of the Night award.

Harris faced Impa Kasanganay on September 18, 2021, at UFC Fight Night 192. He won the fight via technical knockout in round one.

In this third fight with the promotion, Harris faced Shavkat Rakhmonov on February 5, 2022, at UFC Fight Night 200. He lost the fight via knockout in round one.

Harris was scheduled to face Ramiz Brahimaj on February 18, 2023, at UFC Fight Night 219. However, Brahimaj was pulled from the event citing neck injury.

Harris was scheduled to face Abubakar Nurmagomedov on March 11, 2023, at UFC Fight Night 221. However, Nurmagomedov withdrew from the bout due to an undisclosed reasons and was replaced by Jared Gooden. At the weigh-ins, Gooden weighed in at 177 pounds, six pounds over the welterweight non-title fight limit. The bout proceeded at catchweight and Gooden was fined 30% of his purse, which went to Harris. He won the fight via unanimous decision.

Harris faced Jeremiah Wells on August 5, 2023, at UFC on ESPN 50. He won the bout in the third round, choking out Wells via anaconda choke. This win earned Harris his second Performance of the Night bonus.

Harris faced Khaos Williams on May 18, 2024, at UFC Fight Night 241. He lost the fight by knockout in the first round.

Harris faced Santiago Ponzinibbio on January 11, 2025, at UFC Fight Night 249. He lost the fight by technical knockout in the third round.

Harris was scheduled to face Michael Chiesa on March 28, 2026, at UFC Fight Night 271. However, Harris withdrew due to visa issues and was replaced by Niko Price.

Replacing Muslim Salikhov on short notice, Harris faced Jake Matthews on May 30, 2026, at UFC Fight Night 277. Harris lost the fight by unanimous decision.

On June 24, 2026, it was reported that Harris was removed from the UFC roster.

== Championships and accomplishments ==
- Ultimate Fighting Championship
  - Performance of the Night (Two times) vs. Christian Aguilera and Jeremiah Wells
- Brave Combat Federation
  - Brave CF Welterweight Championship (One time)

== Mixed martial arts record ==
Professional record breakdown
27 matches	19 wins	8 losses
By knockout	5	4
By submission	6	0
By decision	8	4

Res.	Record	Opponent	Method	Event	Date	Round	Time	Location	Notes
Loss	19–8	Jake Matthews	Decision (unanimous)	UFC Fight Night: Song vs. Figueiredo	May 30, 2026	3	5:00	Macau SAR, China	
Loss	19–7	Santiago Ponzinibbio	TKO (punches)	UFC Fight Night: Dern vs. Ribas 2	January 11, 2025	3	3:13	Las Vegas, Nevada, United States	
Loss	19–6	Khaos Williams	KO (punch)	UFC Fight Night: Barboza vs. Murphy	May 18, 2024	1	1:30	Las Vegas, Nevada, United States	
Win	19–5	Jeremiah Wells	Technical Submission (anaconda choke)	UFC on ESPN: Sandhagen vs. Font	August 5, 2023	3	1:50	Nashville, Tennessee, United States	Performance of the Night.
Win	18–5	Jared Gooden	Decision (unanimous)	UFC Fight Night: Yan vs. Dvalishvili	March 11, 2023	3	5:00	Las Vegas, Nevada, United States	Catchweight (177 lb) bout; Gooden missed weight.
Loss	17–5	Shavkat Rakhmonov	KO (spinning hook kick and punches)	UFC Fight Night: Hermansson vs. Strickland	February 5, 2022	1	4:10	Las Vegas, Nevada, United States	
Win	17–4	Impa Kasanganay	TKO (punches)	UFC Fight Night: Smith vs. Spann	September 18, 2021	1	2:38	Las Vegas, Nevada, United States	
Win	16–4	Christian Aguilera	Technical Submission (anaconda choke)	UFC on ESPN: Rodriguez vs. Waterson	May 8, 2021	1	2:52	Las Vegas, Nevada, United States	Performance of the Night.
Win	15–4	Saygid Izagakhmaev	Technical Submission (anaconda choke)	UAE Warriors 15	January 15, 2021	2	2:36	Abu Dhabi, United Arab Emirates	
Win	14–4	Alex Santos	KO (punch)	Shooto Brazil 101	September 27, 2020	2	1:12	Rio de Janeiro, Brazil	
Win	13–4	Claudio Rocha	TKO (punches)	Shooto Brazil 99	December 20, 2019	1	N/A	Rio de Janeiro, Brazil	
Loss	12–4	Jarrah Al-Silawi	TKO (punches)	Brave CF 16	September 21, 2018	1	3:51	Abu Dhabi, United Arab Emirates	Lost the Brave CF Welterweight Championship.
Win	12–3	Carl Booth	Decision (unanimous)	Brave CF 8	August 12, 2017	3	5:00	Curitiba, Brazil	Won the inaugural Brave CF Welterweight Championship.
Win	11–3	Thiago Vieira	TKO (punches)	Brave CF 3	March 18, 2017	2	1:04	São José dos Pinhais, Brazil	
Win	10–3	Wellington Turman	Decision (unanimous)	Imortal FC 6	December 10, 2016	3	5:00	Curitiba, Brazil	
Win	9–3	Wellington Vicente	Submission (arm-triangle choke)	Skull FC 1	August 20, 2016	1	1:31	Duque de Caxias, Brazil	
Loss	8–3	Julio Cesar Andrade	Decision (split)	Watch Out Combat Show 43	June 25, 2016	3	5:00	Rio de Janeiro, Brazil	For the WOCS Welterweight Championship.
Win	8–2	Michel Pereira	Decision (unanimous)	XFC International 12	November 28, 2015	3	5:00	São Paulo, Brazil	
Win	7–2	Paulo César	Submission (brabo choke)	XFC International 9	March 14, 2015	1	4:03	São Paulo, Brazil	
Win	6–2	Ariel Jaeger	Decision (unanimous)	XFC International 7	November 1, 2014	3	5:00	São Paulo, Brazil	
Win	5–2	Claudio Rocha	Decision (unanimous)	Cage Combat: Pro MMA 7	June 21, 2014	3	5:00	Bonito, Brazil	
Win	4–2	Cleiton Prisco	Decision (unanimous)	Bitetti Combat 15	May 11, 2013	3	5:00	Rio de Janeiro, Brazil	
Win	3–2	Joilton Lutterbach	Decision (unanimous)	Bitetti Combat 14	March 9, 2013	3	5:00	Rio de Janeiro, Brazil	
Win	2–2	Aldo Ocampos	TKO (punches)	Cage Combat: International Cage Combat 2	August 25, 2012	3	2:21	Campo Grande, Brazil	
Loss	1–2	Fernando Bruno	Decision (unanimous)	Shooto Brazil 28	March 10, 2012	3	5:00	Rio de Janeiro, Brazil	
Win	1–1	Bruno Renascer	Submission (arm-triangle choke)	Beija-Flor Fight Combat	December 3, 2011	1	2:16	Nilópolis, Brazil	
Loss	0–1	Christiano Marques	Decision (split)	Apocalypse FC 1	October 8, 2011	3	5:00	Passo Fundo, Brazil	Welterweight debut.

== See also ==
- List of male mixed martial artists
