= UFC on ESPN: Rodriguez vs. Waterson =

Mixed martial arts event in 2021

- The poster for UFC on ESPN: Rodriguez vs. Waterson
- Promotion: Ultimate Fighting Championship
- Date: May 8, 2021
- Venue: UFC Apex
- City: Enterprise, Nevada, United States
- Attendance: None (behind closed doors)

Event chronology
UFC on ESPN: Reyes vs. Procházka	UFC on ESPN: Rodriguez vs. Waterson	UFC 262: Oliveira vs. Chandler

UFC on ESPN: Rodriguez vs. Waterson (also known as UFC on ESPN 24 and UFC Vegas 26) was a mixed martial arts event produced by the Ultimate Fighting Championship that took place on May 8, 2021, at the UFC Apex facility in Enterprise, Nevada, part of the Las Vegas Metropolitan Area, United States.

== Background ==
A bantamweight bout between former two-time UFC Bantamweight Champion T.J. Dillashaw and Cory Sandhagen was expected to serve as the main event. It would be Dillashaw's first fight since his two-year suspension due to testing positive for recombinant human erythropoietin (EPO), which resulted in his title vacancy. However, Dillashaw announced on April 27 that he had to pull out of the fight due to a cut he received from a headbutt in training. Sandhagen was removed from the card as well, with the pairing remaining intact and rescheduled at a future event. A women's flyweight bout between former Invicta FC Atomweight Champion Michelle Waterson and Marina Rodriguez served as the new main event instead. The pairing usually fights at strawweight, but due to the short notice of the booking, they met at a weight class above.

A women's bantamweight bout between former UFC Women's Bantamweight Champion Holly Holm and The Ultimate Fighter: Team Rousey vs. Team Tate bantamweight winner Julianna Peña was scheduled for the event. However, Holm was forced to withdraw from the bout citing hydronephrosis. In turn, Peña was also removed from the card in favor of a title bout against current champion Amanda Nunes (also the UFC Women's Featherweight Champion) at UFC 265.

A heavyweight bout between Ben Rothwell and Philipe Lins was expected to take place at UFC Fight Night: Edwards vs. Muhammad, but it was canceled due to an injury to Rothwell. The pairing was then rescheduled for this event. While Rothwell made weight without issue, Lins never showed up to the weigh-ins and withdrew from the bout due to an illness.

A welterweight bout between Neil Magny and Geoff Neal was originally scheduled to take place at UFC Fight Night: Smith vs. Rakić, but Neal withdrew from the event due to a severe case of pneumonia that evolved to sepsis. The pairing took place at this event.

Former UFC Women's Flyweight Championship challenger Roxanne Modafferi was expected to face Taila Santos in a women's flyweight bout. However, Modafferi was forced to pull out due to a meniscus tear a month before the event and the bout was scrapped.

Jimmy Flick was expected to face Francisco Figueiredo in a flyweight bout at this event. However on April 10, Flick announced his retirement from mixed martial arts. Figueiredo was then expected to face JP Buys. Buys eventually got injured and also had to pull out. He was replaced by Malcolm Gordon and the new pairing is expected to take place at UFC Fight Night 192 instead.

Nikolas Motta and Damir Hadžović were expected to meet in a lightweight bout. However, Motta pulled out in mid-April due to an injury In turn, Hadžović was rescheduled and is expected to face Yancy Medeiros two weeks later at UFC Fight Night: Font vs. Garbrandt.

Former UFC Lightweight Championship challenger and The Ultimate Fighter 1 middleweight winner Diego Sanchez was expected to face fellow lightweight title challenger Donald Cerrone in a welterweight bout. However, Sanchez was removed from the fight on April 28 after being released by the UFC. He was replaced by Alex Morono.

At the weigh-ins, Carlos Diego Ferreira and Ryan Benoit missed weight for their respective bouts. Ferreira weighed in at 160.5 pounds, four and a half pounds over the lightweight non-title fight limit. His bout proceeded at catchweight and he was fined 30% of his purse, which went to his opponent Gregor Gillespie. Benoit weighed in at 129 pounds, three pounds over the flyweight non-title fight limit. His bout with Zarrukh Adashev was cancelled by the Nevada State Athletic Commission due to health concerns.

A women’s strawweight bout between Amanda Ribas and former Invicta FC Strawweight Champion Angela Hill was expected to take place at the event. However, their bout was scrapped just hours before the event started due to Ribas testing positive for COVID-19.

== Results ==
Main card (ESPN / ESPN+)
Weight class				Method	Round	Time	Notes
Women's Flyweight	Marina Rodriguez	def.	Michelle Waterson	Decision (unanimous) (48–47, 49–46, 49–46)	5	5:00
Welterweight	Alex Morono	def.	Donald Cerrone	TKO (punches)	1	4:40
Welterweight	Neil Magny	def.	Geoff Neal	Decision (unanimous) (29–28, 29–28, 30–27)	3	5:00
Heavyweight	Marcos Rogério de Lima	def.	Maurice Greene	Decision (unanimous) (30–26, 30–26, 30–27)	3	5:00
Catchweight (160.5 lb)	Gregor Gillespie	def.	Carlos Diego Ferreira	TKO (punches)	2	4:51
Middleweight	Phil Hawes	def.	Kyle Daukaus	Decision (unanimous) (30–26, 30–26, 29–27)	3	5:00
Preliminary card (ESPN+)
Featherweight	Michael Trizano	def.	Ľudovít Klein	Decision (unanimous) (29–28, 29–28, 30–27)	3	5:00
Middleweight	Jun Yong Park	def.	Tafon Nchukwi	Decision (majority) (30–25, 29–26, 28–28)	3	5:00	(Note: Nchukwi was deducted one point in round 2 due to repeated groin strikes.)
Welterweight	Carlston Harris	def.	Christian Aguilera	Technical Submission (anaconda choke)	1	2:52

== Bonus awards ==
The following fighters received $50,000 bonuses.

- Fight of the Night: Gregor Gillespie vs. Carlos Diego Ferreira^{1}
- Performance of the Night: Alex Morono and Carlston Harris

1. Ferreira was disqualified for the Fight of the Night bonus due to missing weight, as a result his award was given to Gillespie.

== See also ==
- List of UFC events
- List of current UFC fighters
- 2021 in UFC
