= Christian Aguilera =

American mixed martial arts fighter

- Born: November 25, 1991 (age 34); Whittier, California, United States
- Other names: The Beast
- Height: 5 ft 9 in (1.75 m)
- Weight: 170 lb (77 kg; 12 st 2 lb)
- Division: Welterweight
- Reach: 72.0 in (183 cm)
- Fighting out of: Brea, California
- Team: Total MMA Studios
- Years active: 2013–present

Mixed martial arts record
- Total: 22
- Wins: 14
- By knockout: 11
- By decision: 3
- Losses: 8
- By knockout: 4
- By submission: 2
- By decision: 2

Other information
- Mixed martial arts record from Sherdog

Christian Aguilera (born November 25, 1991) is an American mixed martial artist who competes in the Welterweight division. He formerly fought in the Ultimate Fighting Championship.

== Background ==
Growing up, Aguilera did a little bit of taekwondo and was obsessed with fighting and obsessed with boxing. He started playing hockey, as it was the only major sport with fighting allowed. He played hockey for two years at Northwood School in Lake Placid, New York and had ambitions to play college hockey and then NHL, but they didn't pan out.

== Mixed martial arts career ==
=== Early career ===
Starting his career in 2013, Aguilera fought in LFA, RFA, BAMMA, King of the Cage among others.

Aguilera made his LFA debut at LFA 30 on January 12, 2018, against future LFA Welterweight champion Maycon Mendonça. He won the bout less than 30 seconds into the bout by knocking out Maycon.

After picking up a submission win in King of the Cage. Aguilera returned to LFA to face Ricardo Seixas on March 23, 2018, at LFA 36. He won the bout via knockout again this time in the second round.

Aguilera faced Matthew Frincu on June 29, 2018, at LFA 44. He lost the three round war via unanimous decision.

Aguilera faced former UFC fighter David Michaud on February 2, 2019, at LFA 59. He lost the bout via TKO in the second round.

After picking up a TKO win in the Celtic Gladiator promotion, Aguilera returned to LFA to face Glaucio Eliziario on January 31, 2020, at LFA 81. He won the bout via unanimous decision.

=== Ultimate Fighting Championship ===
Aguilera made his UFC debut against Anthony Ivy on June 13, 2020, at UFC on ESPN: Eye vs. Calvillo. Aguilera won the fight via TKO less than a minute into the bout. This win earned him the Performance of the Night award.

Aguilera faced Sean Brady at UFC Fight Night: Smith vs. Rakić on August 29, 2020. Helost the fight via a guillotine choke in round two.

Aguilera was expected to face Warlley Alves on January 16, 2021, at UFC on ABC: Holloway vs. Kattar. However, Aguilera pulled out in late December due to an injury.

Aguilera faced Carlston Harris on May 8, 2021, at UFC on ESPN: Rodriguez vs. Waterson. He lost the bout via technical submission due to an anaconda choke as he was choked unconscious in the first round.

On May 8, 2021, it was announced that Aguilera was released from the UFC.

=== Post UFC ===
Aguilera was scheduled to face Battlefield Fight League's welterweight champion Dejan Kajic on October 1, 2021, at BFL 69. However, Aguilera pulled out due to injury.

== Professional grappling career ==
Aguilera competed against Herman Terrado at Subversiv 10 for the promotion's 185lbs Combat Jiu-Jitsu title on April 13, 2024. He lost the match by submission in EBI overtime.

== Championships and accomplishments ==
- Ultimate Fighting Championship
  - Performance of the Night (One time) vs. Anthony Ivy

== Mixed martial arts record ==
Professional record breakdown
22 matches	14 wins	8 losses
By knockout	11	4
By submission	0	2
By decision	3	2

Res.	Record	Opponent	Method	Event	Date	Round	Time	Location	Notes
Loss	14–8	Carlston Harris	Technical Submission (anaconda choke)	UFC on ESPN: Rodriguez vs. Waterson	May 8, 2021	1	2:52	Las Vegas, Nevada, United States	
Loss	14–7	Sean Brady	Technical Submission (guillotine choke)	UFC Fight Night: Smith vs. Rakić	August 29, 2020	2	1:47	Las Vegas, Nevada, United States	
Win	14–6	Anthony Ivy	TKO (punches)	UFC on ESPN: Eye vs. Calvillo	June 13, 2020	1	0:59	Las Vegas, Nevada, United States	Performance of the Night.
Win	13–6	Glaucio Eliziario	Decision (unanimous)	LFA 81	January 31, 2020	3	5:00	Costa Mesa, California, United States	
Win	12–6	Krzysztof Kulak	TKO (strikes)	Celtic Gladiator 25	October 4, 2019	1	2:36	Burbank, California, United States	
Loss	11–6	David Michaud	TKO (punches)	LFA 59	February 1, 2019	1	4:14	Phoenix, Arizona, United States	
Loss	11–5	Matthew Frincu	Decision (unanimous)	LFA 44	June 29, 2018	3	5:00	Phoenix, Arizona, United States	
Win	11–4	Ricardo Seixas	KO (punch)	LFA 36	March 23, 2018	2	1:47	Cabazon, California, United States	
Win	10–4	Anthony Hernandez	TKO (submission to punches)	KOTC: Energetic Pursuit	February 24, 2018	1	2:57	Ontario, California, United States	
Win	9–4	Maycon Mendonça	KO (punch)	LFA 30	January 12, 2018	1	0:27	Costa Mesa, California, United States	Return to Welterweight.
Loss	8–4	Richard LeRoy	KO	CXF 10	November 4, 2017	1	1:56	Studio City, California, United States	For CXF Interim Lightweight Championship.
Win	8–3	Joshua Jones	KO (punch)	CXF 9	August 19, 2017	1	0:40	Studio City, California, United States	
Loss	7–3	Matt Sayles	TKO (punches)	CFFC 64: Sayles vs. Aguilera	March 25, 2017	1	1:51	San Diego, California, United States	
Win	7–2	Chris Padilla	Decision (unanimous)	KOTC: Warranted Aggression	December 18, 2016	3	5:00	Ontario, California, United States	
Win	6–2	Tom Gloudeman	TKO (punches)	BAMMA Badbeat 20	June 10, 2016	1	0:20	Commerce, California, United States	
Loss	5–2	Nick Piedmont	Decision (split)	Smash Global: The Main Event 3	March 26, 2016	3	5:00	Los Angeles, California, United States	
Loss	5–1	Darren Smith Jr.	TKO (punches)	BAMMA Badbeat 17	October 2, 2015	1	3:08	Commerce, California, United States	Catchweight (160 lbs) bout.
Win	5–0	Danny Navarro	KO (punches)	BAMMA Badbeat 16	June 26, 2015	1	3:16	Commerce, California, United States	
Win	4–0	Tim Quiroga	TKO (punches)	RFA 23	February 6, 2015	1	0:52	Costa Mesa, California, United States	
Win	3–0	Eric Steans	KO (punch)	BAMMA Badbeat 13	October 10, 2014	1	0:51	Commerce, California, United States	Lightweight debut.
Win	2–0	Kory Kelley	KO (punches)	BAMMA Badbeat 12	March 28, 2014	1	2:05	Commerce, California, United States	
Win	1–0	Blake Belshe	Decision (split)	BAMMA Badbeat 11	October 25, 2013	3	3:00	Commerce, California, United States	Welterweight debut.

== See also ==
- List of male mixed martial artists
