= 2018 in Legacy Fighting Alliance =

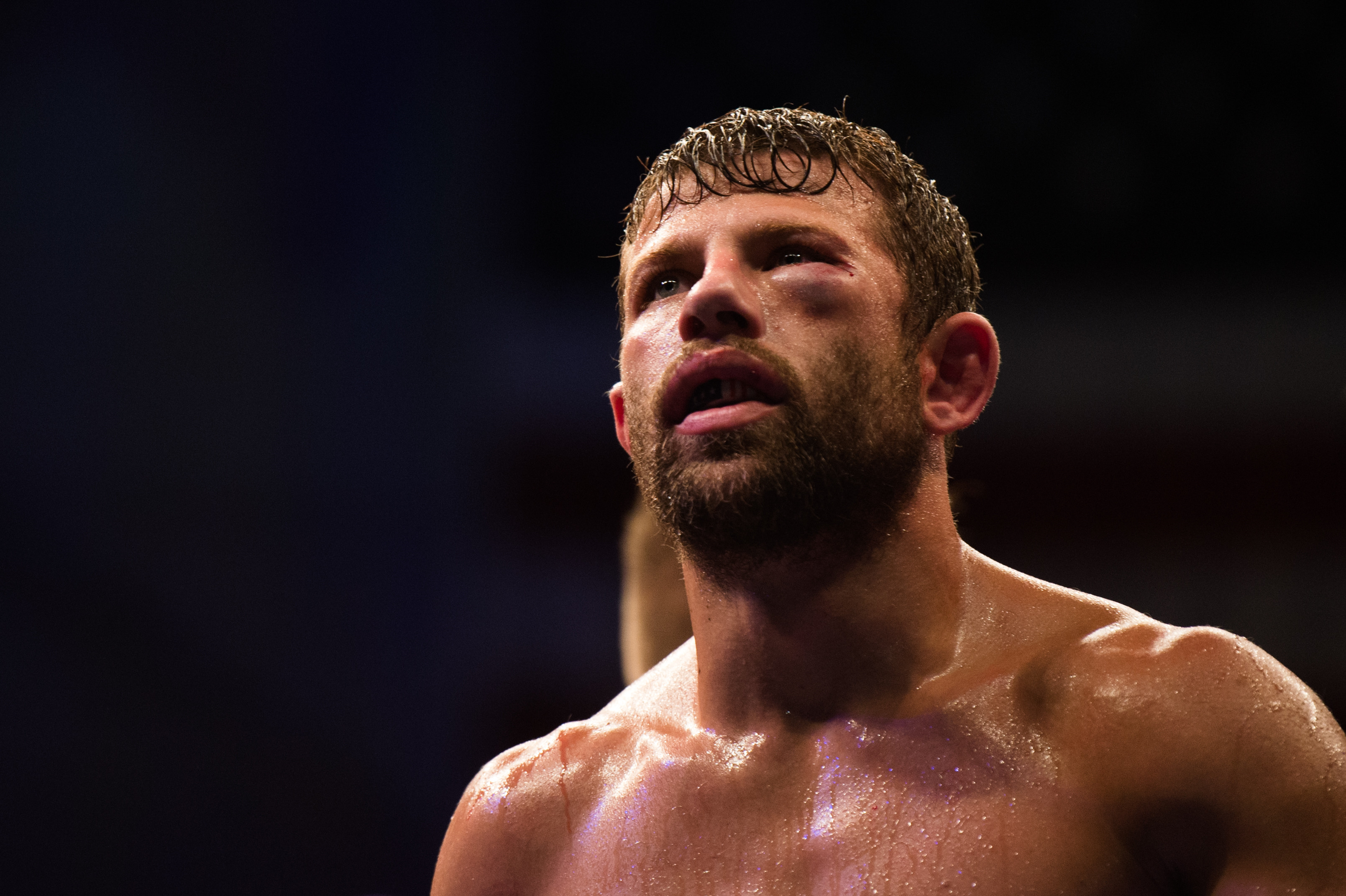
- Shaun Spath after his loss to Ahmet Kayretli at Legacy Fighting Alliance 46: Nakashima vs. Stewart

Information
- Promotion: Legacy Fighting Alliance
- First date aired: January 12, 2018
- Last date aired: December 7, 2018

2018 was the second year in the history of Legacy Fighting Alliance, a mixed martial arts promotion based in the United States.

== Event list ==
=== Legacy Fighting Alliance 30: Millender vs. Barnes ===
Legacy Fighting Alliance 30: Millender vs. Barnes
- Promotion: Legacy Fighting Alliance
- Date: January 12, 2018
- Venue: Costa Mesa Hall at the OC Fair & Event Center
- City: Costa Mesa, California, U.S.

Event chronology
Legacy Fighting Alliance 29: Camus vs. Simón	Legacy Fighting Alliance 30: Millender vs. Barnes	Legacy Fighting Alliance 31: Moffett vs. Le

Legacy Fighting Alliance 30: Millender vs. Barnes was the thirty-first event of Legacy Fighting Alliance and took place on January 12, 2018. It aired on AXS TV.

Results

Main Card
Weight class				Method	Round	Time	Notes
Welterweight	Curtis Millender	def.	Nick Barnes	KO (head kick)	2	2:51
Featherweight	Talison Soares	def.	Fernando Padilla	Decision (unanimous)	3	5:00
Flyweight	Maikel Pérez	def.	Charlie Alaniz	Decision (unanimous)	3	5:00
Middleweight	Jordan Wright	def.	Craig Wilkerson	Submission (rear-naked choke)	1	1:29
Lightweight	Christian Aguilera	def.	Maycon Mendonça	KO (punch)	1	0:27
Bantamweight	Vincent Cachero	def.	Nohelin Hernandez	Decision (unanimous)	3	5:00
Light Heavyweight	Blake Troop	def.	Khadzhi Bestaev	TKO (punches)	1	2:11
Preliminary Card
Featherweight	Jeffrey Glossner	def.	Jose Avalos	TKO (punches)	2	0:40

=== Legacy Fighting Alliance 31: Moffett vs. Le ===
Legacy Fighting Alliance 31: Moffett vs. Le
- Promotion: Legacy Fighting Alliance
- Date: January 19, 2018
- Venue: Comerica Theatre
- City: Phoenix, Arizona, U.S.

Event chronology
Legacy Fighting Alliance 30: Millender vs. Barnes	Legacy Fighting Alliance 31: Moffett vs. Le	Legacy Fighting Alliance 32: Allen vs. Hernandez

Legacy Fighting Alliance 31: Moffett vs. Le was the thirty-second event of Legacy Fighting Alliance and took place on January 19, 2018. It aired on AXS TV.

Results

Main Card
Weight class				Method	Round	Time	Notes
Featherweight	Thanh Le	def.	Bobby Moffett	TKO (punches)	2	0:55	(Note: For the interim LFA Featherweight Championship.)
Middleweight	Ian Heinisch	def.	Daniel Madrid	KO (punch)	2	3:56
Welterweight	Matthew Frincu	def.	Roman Alcantar	TKO (referee stoppage)	2	4:10
Catchweight (130 lbs)	Casey Kenney	def.	Kendrick Latchman	Decision (unanimous)	3	5:00
Featherweight	Jordan Winski	def.	Mike Hamel	Submission (armbar)	1	4:06
Featherweight	Cory Sandhagen	def.	José Aguayo	TKO (knee and punches)	1	1:07
Bantamweight	Mario Bautista	def.	Raphael Montini de Lima	TKO (doctor stoppage)	2	5:00
Preliminary Card
Lightweight	Nick Chasteen	def.	Manny Villarreal	KO (punch)	1	0:39
Lightweight	Anthony Martinez	def.	Steven Hoffman	TKO (Submission to strikes)	2	3:36

=== Legacy Fighting Alliance 32: Allen vs. Hernandez ===
Legacy Fighting Alliance 32: Allen vs. Hernandez
- Promotion: Legacy Fighting Alliance
- Date: January 26, 2018
- Venue: Golden Nugget Hotel and Casino
- City: Lake Charles, Louisiana, U.S.

Event chronology
Legacy Fighting Alliance 31: Moffett vs. Le	Legacy Fighting Alliance 32: Allen vs. Hernandez	Legacy Fighting Alliance 33: Willis vs. Stewart

Legacy Fighting Alliance 32: Allen vs. Hernandez was the thirty-third event of Legacy Fighting Alliance and took place on January 26, 2018. It aired on AXS TV.

Results

Main Card
Weight class				Method	Round	Time	Notes
Middleweight	Anthony Hernandez	def.	Brendan Allen	Decision (unanimous)	5	5:00	(Note: For the vacant LFA Middleweight Championship.)
Light Heavyweight	Ryan Spann	def.	Alex Nicholson	KO (punch)	1	4:24	(Note: For the inaugural LFA Light Heavyweight Championship.)
Welterweight	Carlo Prater	def.	Eric Scallan	Submission (arm-triangle choke)	2	3:39
Lightweight	Zach Fears	def.	Lanny Dardar	TKO (punches)	1	4:28
Heavyweight	Juan Adams	def.	Dwight Gipson	TKO (Submission to strikes)	1	4:09
Catchweight (165 lbs)	Aaron Reeves	def.	Brandon Shavers	Decision (split)	3	5:00
Middleweight	Carlos Martinez	def.	Daniel Hoffpauir	Decision (unanimous)	3	5:00
Preliminary Card
Bantamweight	Javier Obregon	def.	Joel Scott	Submission (guillotine choke)	2	3:52
Middleweight	Marcus Andrusia	def.	Randy Billiot	Submission (kimura)	1	3:38
Light Heavyweight	Aaron Davis	def.	Darrell Wood	TKO (punches)	1	0:38
Amateur Bouts
Featherweight	Timothy Messer	def.	Nicko Commissiong	Submission (armbar)	3	1:33

=== Legacy Fighting Alliance 33: Willis vs. Stewart ===
Legacy Fighting Alliance 33: Willis vs. Stewart
- Promotion: Legacy Fighting Alliance
- Date: February 16, 2018
- Venue: The Bomb Factory
- City: Dallas, Texas, U.S.

Event chronology
Legacy Fighting Alliance 32: Allen vs. Hernandez	Legacy Fighting Alliance 33: Willis vs. Stewart	Legacy Fighting Alliance 34: Watley vs. Jenkins

Legacy Fighting Alliance 33: Willis vs. Stewart was the thirty-fourth event of Legacy Fighting Alliance and took place on February 16, 2018. It aired on AXS TV.

Results

Main Card
Weight class				Method	Round	Time	Notes
Welterweight	Kyle Stewart	def.	Jaleel Willis	Decision (unanimous)	3	5:00
Lightweight	Damon Jackson	def.	Chris Pecero	Technical Submission (arm-triangle choke)	1	0:38
Women's Catchweight (120 lbs)	Maycee Barber	def.	Kaila Thompson	Submission (rear-naked choke)	1	0:31
Welterweight	Ramiz Brahimaj	def.	Bilal Williams	Submission (rear-naked choke)	1	4:10
Light Heavyweight	Alonzo Menifield	def.	Brice Ritani-Coe	Submission (rear-naked choke)	1	2:41
Bantamweight	Kevin Wirth	def.	Isaiah Gutierrez	TKO (head kick)	3	3:33
Preliminary Card
Heavyweight	Greg Hardy	def.	Ryan Chester	TKO (punches)	1	0:14	(Note: Amateur bout)
Featherweight	Austin Lingo	def.	Omar Benjar	KO (punches)	1	2:26
Amateur Bouts
Flyweight	Douglas Serrano	def.	Daniel Gabriel	Decision (split)	3	3:00
Featherweight	Daniel Lemons	def.	Edgardo Guzman	Decision (unanimous)	3	3:00
Flyweight	Steven Orozco	def.	Rashaad Robinson	Decision (unanimous)	3	3:00
Postliminary Card
Flyweight	Victor Altamirano	def.	Chris Salinas	Submission (armbar)	1	4:59
Women's Flyweight	Hailey Cowan	def.	Jeniece Gamez	TKO (doctor stoppage)	2	0:10	(Note: Amateur bout)

=== Legacy Fighting Alliance 34: Watley vs. Jenkins ===
Legacy Fighting Alliance 34: Watley vs. Jenkins
- Promotion: Legacy Fighting Alliance
- Date: March 2, 2018
- Venue: Mystic Lake Casino Hotel
- City: Prior Lake, Minnesota, U.S.

Event chronology
Legacy Fighting Alliance 33: Willis vs. Stewart	Legacy Fighting Alliance 34: Watley vs. Jenkins	Legacy Fighting Alliance 35: Newell vs. Luque

Legacy Fighting Alliance 34: Watley vs. Jenkins was the thirty-fifth event of Legacy Fighting Alliance and took place on March 2, 2018. It aired on AXS TV.

Results

Main Card
Weight class				Method	Round	Time	Notes
Lightweight	Robert Watley (c)	def.	Brandon Jenkins	Decision (unanimous)	5	5:00	(Note: For the LFA Lightweight Championship.)
Lightweight	Trey Ogden	def.	Travis Perzynski	Submission (guillotine choke)	3	0:20
Featherweight	Jordan Griffin	def.	Darrick Minner	Submission (armbar)	2	3:59
Featherweight	Nate Jennerman	def.	John DeVall	Submission (triangle choke)	3	3:09
Women's Flyweight	Kelly Kobold	def.	Katy Collins	Decision (unanimous)	3	5:00
Lightweight	Bobby Lee	def.	Nick Ammerman	Decision (unanimous)	3	5:00
Middleweight	Tim Hiley	def.	Willie Whitehead	TKO (Submission to strikes)	2	2:31
Preliminary Card
Heavyweight	Calyn Hull	def.	Patrick Martin	Decision (unanimous)	3	5:00
Middleweight	Alton Cunningham	def.	Wayman Carter	KO (punch)	3	0:40
Amateur Bouts
Bantamweight	Zachary Buros-Nash	def.	Elliott Jurries	TKO (punches)	1	1:49
Women's Flyweight	Jordan Nickelatti	def.	Christina Ricker	Decision (unanimous)	3	3:00
Flyweight	Tyus White	def.	Daniel Soriano	Decision (unanimous)	3	3:00
Catchweight (175 lbs)	Ben Ross	def.	Joey Hart	Decision (unanimous)	3	3:00
Featherweight	Zachary Flessas	def.	Thomas Vievering	Submission (rear-naked choke)	1	2:57

=== Legacy Fighting Alliance 35: Newell vs. Luque ===
Legacy Fighting Alliance 35: Newell vs. Luque
- Promotion: Legacy Fighting Alliance
- Date: March 9, 2018
- Venue: Arena Theatre
- City: Houston, Texas, U.S.

Event chronology
Legacy Fighting Alliance 34: Watley vs. Jenkins	Legacy Fighting Alliance 35: Newell vs. Luque	Legacy Fighting Alliance 36: Simón vs. Zani

Legacy Fighting Alliance 35: Newell vs. Luque was the thirty-sixth event of Legacy Fighting Alliance and took place on March 9, 2018. It aired on AXS TV.

Results

Main Card
Weight class				Method	Round	Time	Notes
Catchweight (160 lbs)	Nick Newell	def.	Sonny Luque	Submission (rear-naked choke)	1	2:10
Heavyweight	Vernon Lewis	def.	Jared Vanderaa	Decision (unanimous)	3	5:00
Welterweight	Jason Langellier	def.	Thomas Webb	Submission (D'arce choke)	1	1:10
Featherweight	Charles Cheeks III	def.	Rivaldo Junior	Decision (unanimous)	3	5:00
Bantamweight	Adrian Yañez	def.	Nathan Trepagnier	KO (punch)	1	4:56
Women's Strawweight	Cheyanne Vlismas	def.	Karla Hernandez	TKO (elbows)	3	4:22
Bantamweight	Leomana Martinez	def.	Casey Jones	KO (punches)	1	2:25
Preliminary Card
Catchweight (150 lbs)	Daniel Pineda	def.	Josh Davila	TKO (punches)	2	0:58
Flyweight	Jonathan Davis	def.	Blake Wells	Decision (unanimous)	3	5:00
Lightweight	Craig Grove	def.	Isai Cabrera	Submission (guillotine choke)	2	2:58	(Note: Amateur bout)
Middleweight	Shane Sobnosky	def.	Hugh O'Donnell	KO (punch)	2	0:08
Postliminary Card
Catchweight (150 lbs)	Joseph McCamish	def.	Tony Biernesser	TKO (punches)	1	2:24
Flyweight	Jacob Silva	def.	Raul Garcia	KO (punch)	1	0:30
Postliminary Card (Amateur Bouts)
Bantamweight	Eddie Torres	def.	Eduardo Anaya	TKO (referee stoppage)	2	0:10

=== Legacy Fighting Alliance 36: Simón vs. Zani ===
Legacy Fighting Alliance 36: Simón vs. Zani
- Promotion: Legacy Fighting Alliance
- Date: March 23, 2018
- Venue: Morongo Casino, Resort & Spa
- City: Cabazon, California, U.S.

Event chronology
Legacy Fighting Alliance 35: Newell vs. Luque	Legacy Fighting Alliance 36: Simón vs. Zani	Legacy Fighting Alliance 37: Bice vs. Perez

Legacy Fighting Alliance 36: Simón vs. Zani was the thirty-seventh event of Legacy Fighting Alliance and took place on March 23, 2018. It aired on AXS TV.

Results

Main Card
Weight class				Method	Round	Time	Notes
Bantamweight	Ricky Simón (c)	def.	Vinicius Zani	KO (punches)	1	0:59	(Note: For the LFA Bantamweight Championship.)
Featherweight	Jamall Emmers	def.	Guilherme Faria	TKO (punches)	3	1:18
Welterweight	Christian Aguilera	def.	Ricardo Seixas	KO (punch)	2	1:47
Bantamweight	Andre Ewell	def.	Trent Meaux	KO (punch)	1	1:41
Light Heavyweight	Herdem Alacabek	def.	Jonathan Noriega	TKO (knees and punches)	1	2:19
Lightweight	Tommy Aaron	def.	Troy Guerrero	Submission (rear-naked choke)	1	4:15
Middleweight	Taylor Johnson	def.	Corey Turner	TKO (elbows and punches)	1	0:36
Preliminary Card
Bantamweight	Anthony Jimenez	def.	Jeffrey Glossner	Decision (unanimous)	3	5:00
Featherweight	Natan Levy	def.	Marcus Sims	Submission (armbar)	1	1:25
Amateur Bouts
Heavyweight	Juan Rubio	def.	Jake Conde	TKO (punches)	1	0:18
Flyweight	Anthony Roque	def.	Daniel Parks	Submission (rear-naked choke)	2	1:40
Postliminary Card
Bantamweight	Benji Gomez	def.	Steve Swanson	Decision (unanimous)	3	5:00
Heavyweight	Irvins Ayala	def.	Drew Chatman	Disqualification (unsportsmanlike conduct)	1	2:39

=== Legacy Fighting Alliance 37: Bice vs. Perez ===
Legacy Fighting Alliance 37: Bice vs. Perez
- Promotion: Legacy Fighting Alliance
- Date: April 20, 2018
- Venue: Sanford Pentagon
- City: Sioux Falls, South Dakota, U.S.

Event chronology
Legacy Fighting Alliance 36: Simón vs. Zani	Legacy Fighting Alliance 37: Bice vs. Perez	Legacy Fighting Alliance 38: Hughes vs. Greene

Legacy Fighting Alliance 37: Bice vs. Perez was the thirty-eighth event of Legacy Fighting Alliance and took place on April 20, 2018. It aired on AXS TV.

Results

Main Card
Weight class				Method	Round	Time	Notes
Flyweight	Maikel Pérez	def.	Sid Bice	TKO (punches)	2	4:14	(Note: For the vacant LFA Flyweight Championship.)
Women's Flyweight	Sabina Mazo	def.	Shannon Sinn	Decision (unanimous)	5	5:00	(Note: For the vacant LFA Women's Flyweight Championship.)
Welterweight	Jordon Larson	def.	Darrius Flowers	Submission (arm-triangle choke)	3	2:50
Lightweight	Bryce Logan	def.	Dakota Bush	Decision (unanimous)	3	5:00
Lightweight	Demarques Jackson	def.	Hamilton Ash	KO (punches)	1	1:48
Welterweight	Tyler Ray	def.	Theron Martin	Decision (unanimous)	3	5:00
Preliminary Card
Flyweight	Robiel Tesfaldet	def.	Chris Collins	Submission (rear-naked choke)	1	3:27
Amateur Bouts
Middleweight	Jeff Nielsen	def.	Alex Messmer	TKO (punches)	1	1:48
Featherweight	Traevon Kroger	def.	Aaron Svenson	TKO (punches)	1	0:30

=== Legacy Fighting Alliance 38: Hughes vs. Greene ===
Legacy Fighting Alliance 38: Hughes vs. Greene
- Promotion: Legacy Fighting Alliance
- Date: April 27, 2018
- Venue: Minneapolis Armory
- City: Minneapolis, Minnesota, U.S.

Event chronology
Legacy Fighting Alliance 37: Bice vs. Perez	Legacy Fighting Alliance 38: Hughes vs. Greene	Legacy Fighting Alliance 39: Heinisch vs. Checco

Legacy Fighting Alliance 38: Hughes vs. Greene was the thirty-ninth event of Legacy Fighting Alliance and took place on April 27, 2018. It aired on AXS TV.

Results

Main Card
Weight class				Method	Round	Time	Notes
Heavyweight	Jeff Hughes (c)	def.	Maurice Greene	Decision (unanimous)	5	5:00	(Note: For the LFA Heavyweight Championship.)
Middleweight	Bevon Lewis	def.	Collin Huckbody	Decision (unanimous)	3	5:00
Welterweight	Tat Romero	def.	Dane Sayers	Decision (unanimous)	3	5:00
Catchweight (175 lbs)	Charlie Brown	def.	Chris Bachmeier	Submission (rear-naked choke)	3	2:18
Welterweight	Ashkan Morvari	def.	Cody Lincoln	TKO (punches)	2	2:53
Women's Strawweight	Mallory Martin	def.	Linsey Williams	Submission (rear-naked choke)	2	3:18
Heavyweight	Josh Parisian	def.	Zach Thumb	TKO (punches)	1	2:39
Preliminary Card
Lightweight	Kenn Glenn	def.	Josh Shaw	Decision (split)	3	5:00
Amateur Bouts
Lightweight	Davi Young	def.	Max Bradley	TKO (punches)	1	2:06
Featherweight	Bobbie French	def.	Ryan Ferguson	Decision (unanimous)	3	3:00
Welterweight	Mike Munos	def.	Pengi Mboma	Submission (rear-naked choke)	2	2:23
Postliminary Card
Bantamweight	Caleb Merth	def.	Kazim Khan	KO (punch)	1	3:08
Middleweight	Joshua Kohler	def.	Thomas Krenzel	Decision (unanimous)	5	5:00

=== Legacy Fighting Alliance 39: Heinisch vs. Checco ===
Legacy Fighting Alliance 39: Heinisch vs. Checco
- Promotion: Legacy Fighting Alliance
- Date: May 4, 2018
- Venue: Dobson Arena
- City: Vail, Colorado, U.S.

Event chronology
Legacy Fighting Alliance 38: Hughes vs. Greene	Legacy Fighting Alliance 39: Heinisch vs. Checco	Legacy Fighting Alliance 40: Aguilar vs. Le

Legacy Fighting Alliance 39: Heinisch vs. Checco was the fortieth event of Legacy Fighting Alliance and took place on May 4, 2018. It aired on AXS TV.

Results

Main Card
Weight class				Method	Round	Time	Notes
Middleweight	Ian Heinisch	def.	Gabriel Checco	KO (punches)	1	3:44	(Note: For the interim LFA Middleweight Championship.)
Middleweight	Hayward Charles	def.	Christiano Frohlich	Decision (unanimous)	3	5:00
Flyweight	Brandon Royval	def.	Jerome Rivera	TKO (referee stoppage)	1	0:40
Women's Strawweight	Maycee Barber	def.	Audrey Perkins	TKO (punches)	3	2:54
Lightweight	Austin Hubbard	def.	Harvey Park	Decision (unanimous)	3	5:00
Catchweight (140 lbs)	Ahmet Kayretli	def.	Turrell Galloway	TKO (referee stoppage)	2	5:00
Featherweight	Youssef Zalal	def.	Daniel Soto	Submission (rear-naked choke)	2	1:38
Preliminary Card (Amateur Bouts)
Women's Featherweight	Carmen Sage	def.	Jesonna Ollis	Submission (armbar)	2	2:04
Lightweight	Chris Roybal	def.	Matthew Powers	TKO (retirement)	1	3:00
Bantamweight	Josiah Reyes	def.	Ryan Marcinkevich	TKO (punches)	2	1:26

=== Legacy Fighting Alliance 40: Aguilar vs. Le ===
Legacy Fighting Alliance 40: Aguilar vs. Le
- Promotion: Legacy Fighting Alliance
- Date: May 25, 2018
- Venue: The Bomb Factory
- City: Dallas, Texas, U.S.

Event chronology
Legacy Fighting Alliance 39: Heinisch vs. Checco	Legacy Fighting Alliance 40: Aguilar vs. Le	Legacy Fighting Alliance 41: Moisés vs. Peterson

Legacy Fighting Alliance 40: Aguilar vs. Le was the forty-first event of Legacy Fighting Alliance and took place on May 25, 2018. It aired on AXS TV.

Results

Main Card
Weight class				Method	Round	Time	Notes
Featherweight	Kevin Aguilar (c)	def.	Thanh Le (ic)	KO (punches)	1	2:44	(Note: For the LFA Featherweight Championship.)
Featherweight	Damon Jackson	def.	Jeremy Spoon	Submission (rear-naked choke)	2	3:59
Lightweight	Levi Mowles	def.	Rey Trujillo	Submission (rear-naked choke)	2	2:52
Bantamweight	Miles Johns	def.	Eric Ellington	Submission (guillotine choke)	2	4:13
Welterweight	Evan Cutts	def.	Ramiz Brahimaj	Decision (unanimous)	3	5:00
Women's Flyweight	Victoria Leonardo	def.	Hailey Cowan	Submission (rear-naked choke)	1	4:27
Flyweight	Devin Miller	def.	Carlos Vergara	Submission (rear-naked choke)	1	0:54
Preliminary Card
Light Heavyweight	Kennedy Nzechukwu	def.	Corey Johnson	TKO (punches)	2	2:24
Flyweight	Victor Altamirano	def.	Osiris Ayala	Decision (unanimous)	3	5:00
Bantamweight	Hunter Joffre	vs.	Charles Spoolstra	Draw (majority)	3	5:00
Amateur Bouts
Women's Flyweight	Leanne Calderon	def.	Lindsay Hughes	KO (punch)	1	0:19
Postliminary Card
Featherweight	Austin Lingo	def.	Phil Gonzalez	Decision (unanimous)	3	5:00
Postliminary Card (Amateur Bouts)
Bantamweight	Lucas Brennan	def.	Diara Culpepper	Decision (unanimous)	3	3:00

=== Legacy Fighting Alliance 41: Moisés vs. Peterson ===
Legacy Fighting Alliance 41: Moisés vs. Peterson
- Promotion: Legacy Fighting Alliance
- Date: June 1, 2018
- Venue: Mystic Lake Casino Hotel
- City: Prior Lake, Minnesota, U.S.

Event chronology
Legacy Fighting Alliance 40: Aguilar vs. Le	Legacy Fighting Alliance 41: Moisés vs. Peterson	Legacy Fighting Alliance 42: Krantz vs. Kayne

Legacy Fighting Alliance 41: Moisés vs. Peterson was the forty-second event of Legacy Fighting Alliance and took place on June 1, 2018. It aired on AXS TV.

Results

Main Card
Weight class				Method	Round	Time	Notes
Lightweight	Thiago Moisés	def.	Jeff Peterson	Submission (guillotine choke)	2	4:31
Lightweight	Killys Mota	def.	Bobby Lee	Submission (guillotine choke)	2	0:21
Featherweight	Nate Jennerman	def.	Kevin Croom	Technical Submission (guillotine choke)	1	0:48
Welterweight	Ben Neumann	def.	Bobby Cooper	Decision (unanimous)	3	5:00
Catchweight (150 lbs)	Jordan Griffin	def.	Shawn West	Submission (neck crank)	1	4:52
Middleweight	Tim Hiley	def.	Tyler Vogel	Decision (unanimous)	3	5:00
Heavyweight	Calyn Hull	def.	Ryan Debelak	Submission (arm-triangle choke)	2	1:59
Preliminary Card
Catchweight (165 lbs)	Brandon Jenkins	def.	Luke Gwaltney	TKO (punches)	3	2:10
Amateur Bouts
Women's Atomweight	Amanda Byers	def.	Brittany Nieman	TKO (punches)	2	2:50
Featherweight	Thomas Vievering	def.	Tyler Manning	Submission (guillotine choke)	1	0:57
Heavyweight	Thomas Peterson	def.	Keefer Bender	Submission (americana)	1	2:42
Lightweight	Coty Milhausen	def.	Clay Uddley	KO (punch)	3	2:21
Featherweight	Sean Strube	def.	Houston Conway	Submission (D'arce choke)	1	0:55
Welterweight	Joey Hart	def.	Nicholas Rahn	TKO (punches)	2	1:45
Strawweight	Daniel Soriano	def.	Mario Gomez	Submission (kimura)	1	2:53

=== Legacy Fighting Alliance 42: Krantz vs. Kayne ===
Legacy Fighting Alliance 42: Krantz vs. Kayne
- Promotion: Legacy Fighting Alliance
- Date: June 8, 2018
- Venue: Branson Convention Center
- City: Branson, Missouri, U.S.

Event chronology
Legacy Fighting Alliance 41: Moisés vs. Peterson	Legacy Fighting Alliance 42: Krantz vs. Kayne	Legacy Fighting Alliance 43: Allen vs. Crowe

Legacy Fighting Alliance 42: Krantz vs. Kayne was the forty-third event of Legacy Fighting Alliance and took place on June 8, 2018. It aired on AXS TV.

Results

Main Card
Weight class				Method	Round	Time	Notes
Welterweight	Derrick Krantz	def.	Kassius Kayne	Decision (split)	3	5:00
Welterweight	Jaleel Willis	def.	Chel Erwin-Davis	TKO (punches)	1	1:10
Women's Flyweight	Jaymee Nievara	def.	Katy Collins	Decision (unanimous)	3	5:00
Featherweight	Josh Marsh	def.	TeeJay Britton	KO (punches)	1	1:15
Flyweight	Charles Johnson	def.	Andrew Kimzey	TKO (punches)	1	1:41
Lightweight	Lucas Clay	def.	Mike Breeden	Decision (split)	3	5:00
Light Heavyweight	Julius Anglickas	def.	Erick Murray	Submission (rear-naked choke)	3	2:29
Preliminary Card
Middleweight	Tyler Flores	def.	Marco Hutch	Submission (rear-naked choke)	2	2:02
Middleweight	Frank Cortez	def.	Ryan Erickson	KO (punch)	1	0:16
Amateur Bouts
Catchweight (180 lbs)	Dallen Gettling	def.	Nate Free	KO (punch)	3	2:02
Women's Bantamweight	Josee Storts	def.	Lesandra Franklin	Decision (unanimous)	3	3:00

=== Legacy Fighting Alliance 43: Allen vs. Crowe ===
Legacy Fighting Alliance 43: Allen vs. Crowe
- Promotion: Legacy Fighting Alliance
- Date: June 22, 2018
- Venue: Beaumont Civic Center
- City: Beaumont, Texas, U.S.

Event chronology
Legacy Fighting Alliance 42: Krantz vs. Kayne	Legacy Fighting Alliance 43: Allen vs. Crowe	Legacy Fighting Alliance 44: Frincu vs. Aguilera

Legacy Fighting Alliance 43: Allen vs. Crowe was the forty-fourth event of Legacy Fighting Alliance and took place on June 22, 2018. It aired on AXS TV.

Results

Main Card
Weight class				Method	Round	Time	Notes
Middleweight	Brendan Allen	def.	Larry Crowe	KO (punch)	1	2:06
Featherweight	Jake Heffernan	def.	Peter Stanonik	Decision (unanimous)	3	5:00
Lightweight	Cameron Graves	def.	Jordan Titoni	TKO (head kick and punches)	3	3:38
Catchweight (160 lbs)	Gleidson Cutis	def.	Nico Echeverry	Decision (split)	3	5:00
Featherweight	Kolton Englund	def.	Justin Prescott	Decision (unanimous)	3	5:00
Women's Strawweight	Itzel Esquivel	def.	Desiree Yanez	Submission (armbar)	1	3:32
Heavyweight	Jeremy Hardy	def.	Joel Moore	TKO (punches)	1	2:54
Preliminary Card
Flyweight	Ramiro Ruiz	def.	Christian Lira	Decision (split)	3	5:00
Bantamweight	Joel Scott	def.	Jeremiah Castillo	Submission (guillotine choke)	1	1:42

=== Legacy Fighting Alliance 44: Frincu vs. Aguilera ===
Legacy Fighting Alliance 44: Frincu vs. Aguilera
- Promotion: Legacy Fighting Alliance
- Date: June 29, 2018
- Venue: Comerica Theater
- City: Phoenix, Arizona, U.S.

Event chronology
Legacy Fighting Alliance 43: Allen vs. Crowe	Legacy Fighting Alliance 44: Frincu vs. Aguilera	Legacy Fighting Alliance 45: Silva vs. Barnes

Legacy Fighting Alliance 44: Frincu vs. Aguilera was the forty-fifth event of Legacy Fighting Alliance and took place on June 29, 2018. It aired on AXS TV.

Results

Main Card
Weight class				Method	Round	Time	Notes
Welterweight	Matthew Frincu	def.	Christian Aguilera	Decision (unanimous)	3	5:00
Bantamweight	Casey Kenney	def.	Roman Salazar	Decision (unanimous)	3	5:00
Featherweight	Joey Miolla	def.	Glen Baker	Decision (unanimous)	3	5:00
Featherweight	Kamuela Kirk	def.	Boimah Karmo	Submission (rear-naked choke)	1	2:13
Catchweight (130 lbs)	Richard Palencia	def.	Kevin Wirth	Decision (split)	3	5:00
Lightweight	Keoni Diggs	def.	Andy Varela	TKO (strikes)	2	4:00
Bantamweight	Mario Bautista	def.	A.J. Robb	Submission (guillotine choke)	2	3:30
Preliminary Card
Welterweight	Darrius Flowers	def.	Anthony Rozema	KO (punches)	1	0:22
Bantamweight	Kevin Natividad	def.	Tyler Bialecki	TKO (punches)	1	4:55
Amateur Bouts
Featherweight	Ivan Tena	def.	Christian Leon	TKO (punches)	3	0:23

=== Legacy Fighting Alliance 45: Silva vs. Barnes ===
Legacy Fighting Alliance 45: Silva vs. Barnes
- Promotion: Legacy Fighting Alliance
- Date: July 20, 2018
- Venue: Morongo Casino, Resort & Spa
- City: Cabazon, California, U.S.

Event chronology
Legacy Fighting Alliance 44: Frincu vs. Aguilera	Legacy Fighting Alliance 45: Silva vs. Barnes	Legacy Fighting Alliance 46: Nakashima vs. Stewart

Legacy Fighting Alliance 45: Silva vs. Barnes was the forty-sixth event of Legacy Fighting Alliance and took place on July 20, 2018. It aired on AXS TV.

Results

Main Card
Weight class				Method	Round	Time	Notes
Welterweight	Erick Silva	def.	Nick Barnes	Submission (armbar)	1	4:43
Bantamweight	Ryan Lilley	def.	Jordan Winski	KO (punches)	1	2:37
Middleweight	Moses Murrietta	def.	Casey Ryan	TKO (retirement)	2	5:00
Light Heavyweight	Blake Troop	def.	James Cannon	TKO (punches)	1	1:24
Bantamweight	Vincent Cachero	def.	Carlos Puente Jr.	Submission (rear-naked choke)	2	4:19
Middleweight	Taylor Johnson	def.	Luc Bondole	TKO (punches)	1	1:36
Middleweight	Kailan Hill	def.	Alex Thompson	KO (head kick and punches)	1	1:18
Preliminary Card
Featherweight	Natan Levy	def.	Cameron Underhill	Submission (guillotine choke)	1	0:29
Light Heavyweight	Herdem Alacabek	def.	Dejon Daniels	Submission (rear-naked choke)	1	4:46
Welterweight	Kona Oliveira	def.	L.J. Portée	TKO (punches)	1	2:39
Amateur Bouts
Light Heavyweight	Chadricc Kindle	def.	Juan Rubio	TKO (punches)	2	1:12
Women's Flyweight	Mary Almario	def.	Ambar De La Herran	Decision (unanimous)	3	3:00
Postliminary Card
Bantamweight	Jose Medina	def.	Taylor Alfaro	Decision (split)	3	5:00

=== Legacy Fighting Alliance 46: Nakashima vs. Stewart ===
Legacy Fighting Alliance 46: Nakashima vs. Stewart
- Promotion: Legacy Fighting Alliance
- Date: July 27, 2018
- Venue: Felker Field Hangar at Joint Base Langley-Eustis
- City: Newport News, Virginia, U.S.

Event chronology
Legacy Fighting Alliance 45: Silva vs. Barnes	Legacy Fighting Alliance 46: Nakashima vs. Stewart	Legacy Fighting Alliance 47: Jackson vs. Jennerman

Legacy Fighting Alliance 46: Nakashima vs. Stewart was the forty-seventh event of Legacy Fighting Alliance and took place on July 27, 2018. It aired on AXS TV.

Results

Main Card
Weight class				Method	Round	Time	Notes
Welterweight	James Nakashima (c)	def.	Kyle Stewart	Decision (unanimous)	5	5:00	(Note: For the LFA Welterweight Championship.)
Featherweight	Alexandre Bezerra	def.	Sam Toomer	TKO (punches)	2	3:00
Light Heavyweight	Cristian Torres	def.	Dashawn Boatwright	KO (punch)	1	2:58
Catchweight (140 lbs)	Ahmet Kayretli	def.	Shaun Spath	TKO (strikes)	2	4:00
Welterweight	Mumia Abu Dey Ali	def.	Mitch Aguiar	KO (punch)	1	0:31
Women's Flyweight	Victoria Leonardo	def.	Salina Rowland	Decision (unanimous)	3	5:00
Preliminary Card
Featherweight	Michael Lawrence	def.	Chris Rollins	Decision (unanimous)	3	5:00
Welterweight	Micah Terrill	def.	Ryan Jett	Decision (unanimous)	3	5:00
Featherweight	Adi Alic	def.	Terrell Hobbs	TKO (strikes)	1	1:28
Postliminary Card
Featherweight	Armando Villarreal	def.	Thomas Blair	Decision (unanimous)	3	5:00

=== Legacy Fighting Alliance 47: Jackson vs. Jennerman ===
Legacy Fighting Alliance 47: Jackson vs. Jennerman
- Promotion: Legacy Fighting Alliance
- Date: August 10, 2018
- Venue: The Bomb Factory
- City: Dallas, Texas, U.S.

Event chronology
Legacy Fighting Alliance 46: Nakashima vs. Stewart	Legacy Fighting Alliance 47: Jackson vs. Jennerman	Legacy Fighting Alliance 48: Stots vs. Lilley

Legacy Fighting Alliance 47: Jackson vs. Jennerman was the forty-eighth event of Legacy Fighting Alliance and took place on August 10, 2018. It aired on AXS TV.

Results

Main Card
Weight class				Method	Round	Time	Notes
Featherweight	Damon Jackson	def.	Nate Jennerman	KO (punch)	2	0:33	(Note: For the interim LFA Featherweight Championship.)
Featherweight	Levi Mowles	def.	Charles Cheeks III	Submission (rear-naked choke)	2	0:17
Welterweight	Ramiz Brahimaj	def.	William Macário	Submission (guillotine choke)	2	2:34
Welterweight	Bilal Williams	def.	Sean Spencer	TKO (punches)	2	0:58
Women's Strawweight	Valerie Soto	def.	Cristina Crist	Decision (unanimous)	3	5:00
Featherweight	Eddie Brown	def.	Elijah Johns	Decision (split)	3	5:00
Bantamweight	Evers Anderson	def.	Devin Miller	Decision (split)	3	5:00
Preliminary Card (Amateur Bouts)
Flyweight	Xavier Franklin	def.	Christopher Williams	KO (punch)	1	N/A
Lightweight	Johnny Smith	def.	Darren Whitney	Submission (D'arce choke)	3	N/A
Welterweight	Fernando Duran	def.	Josael Fuentes	TKO (strikes)	3	N/A

=== Legacy Fighting Alliance 48: Stots vs. Lilley ===
Legacy Fighting Alliance 48: Stots vs. Lilley
- Promotion: Legacy Fighting Alliance
- Date: September 7, 2018
- Venue: Viaero Center
- City: Kearney, Nebraska, U.S.

Event chronology
Legacy Fighting Alliance 47: Jackson vs. Jennerman	Legacy Fighting Alliance 48: Stots vs. Lilley	Legacy Fighting Alliance 49: Brady vs. Urbina

Legacy Fighting Alliance 48: Stots vs. Lilley was the forty-ninth event of Legacy Fighting Alliance and took place on September 7, 2018. It aired on AXS TV.

Results

Main Card
Weight class				Method	Round	Time	Notes
Bantamweight	Raufeon Stots	def.	Ryan Lilley	TKO (punches)	3	3:00
Flyweight	Brandon Royval	def.	Charles Johnson	Decision (unanimous)	3	5:00
Welterweight	Calen Born	def.	Kassius Kayne	Decision (unanimous)	3	5:00
Bantamweight	Ryan MacDonald	def.	Trevor Ward	Submission (guillotine choke)	2	2:06
Featherweight	Kevin Croom	def.	Darrick Minner	TKO (elbows)	2	2:10
Welterweight	Austin Jones	def.	Duane Johnson	Decision (split)	3	5:00
Welterweight	Brock Smith	def.	Joe Boerschig	Decision (unanimous)	3	5:00
Preliminary Card
Flyweight	Delfino Benitez	def.	Terry Van Hoosear	Submission (armbar)	3	2:03
Amateur Bouts
Featherweight	Nate Morrow	def.	Jared Tallent	Submission (guillotine choke)	1	2:51
Lightweight	Roy Garza	def.	Jamon Cotton	TKO (strikes)	1	1:42
Flyweight	Jayson Scott	def.	Richard Ifekandu	TKO (strikes)	2	1:38
Lightweight	Stephan Duffy	def.	Joshua Cinocco	Decision (unanimous)	3	3:00

=== Legacy Fighting Alliance 49: Brady vs. Urbina ===
Legacy Fighting Alliance 49: Brady vs. Urbina
- Promotion: Legacy Fighting Alliance
- Date: September 14, 2018
- Venue: Golden Nugget Hotel & Casino
- City: Atlantic City, New Jersey, U.S.

Event chronology
Legacy Fighting Alliance 48: Stots vs. Lilley	Legacy Fighting Alliance 49: Brady vs. Urbina	Legacy Fighting Alliance 50: Allen vs. Hiley

Legacy Fighting Alliance 49: Brady vs. Urbina was the fiftieth event of Legacy Fighting Alliance and took place on September 14, 2018. It aired on AXS TV.

Results

Main Card
Weight class				Method	Round	Time	Notes
Welterweight	Sean Brady	def.	Gilbert Urbina	Decision (unanimous)	3	5:00
Welterweight	Jonavin Webb	def.	Tanner Saraceno	Decision (unanimous)	3	5:00
Featherweight	Andy Main	def.	Saul Almeida	Decision (unanimous)	3	5:00
Catchweight (175 lbs)	Stephen Regman	def.	Will Santiago	KO (punch)	1	4:34
Featherweight	John de Jesus	def.	Adi Alic	Decision (unanimous)	3	5:00
Bantamweight	Ahmet Kayretli	def.	Andrew Salas	Decision (unanimous)	3	5:00
Catchweight (160 lbs)	Dakota Bush	def.	Patrick Rivera	Submission (rear-naked choke)	3	4:49
Preliminary Card
Featherweight	Kenneth Richmond	def.	Benjamin Allen	TKO (strikes)	1	2:30

=== Legacy Fighting Alliance 50: Allen vs. Hiley ===
Legacy Fighting Alliance 50: Allen vs. Hiley
- Promotion: Legacy Fighting Alliance
- Date: September 21, 2018
- Venue: Mystic Lake Casino Hotel
- City: Prior Lake, Minnesota, U.S.

Event chronology
Legacy Fighting Alliance 49: Brady vs. Urbina	Legacy Fighting Alliance 50: Allen vs. Hiley	Legacy Fighting Alliance 51: Gibson vs. Erak

Legacy Fighting Alliance 50: Allen vs. Hiley was the fifty-first event of Legacy Fighting Alliance and took place on September 21, 2018. It aired on AXS TV.

Results

Main Card
Weight class				Method	Round	Time	Notes
Middleweight	Brendan Allen	def.	Tim Hiley	Submission (rear-naked choke)	3	3:16	(Note: For the vacant LFA Middleweight Championship.)
Heavyweight	Raphael Pessoa	def.	Brian Heden	TKO (punches)	1	1:39
Welterweight	Bobby Lee	def.	Ben Neumann	KO (flying knee)	2	3:50
Welterweight	Jason Witt	def.	Ashkan Morvari	Submission (rear-naked choke)	3	1:01
Featherweight	Josh Marsh	def.	Dima Gerasimov	Decision (unanimous)	3	5:00
Bantamweight	Oscar Askar	def.	Derrick Mandell	Decision (unanimous)	3	5:00
Heavyweight	Daniel James	def.	Calyn Hull	TKO (punches)	2	0:32
Preliminary Card
Welterweight	Mike Breeden	def.	Craig Eckelberg	TKO (punches)	1	4:11
Amateur Bouts
Middleweight	Jeff Stewart	def.	David Vinje	Decision (unanimous)	3	3:00
Featherweight	Motaz Askar	def.	Karter Holthusen	Decision (unanimous)	3	3:00
Flyweight	Joshua Clark	def.	Jeremiah Harper	Decision (split)	3	3:00
Strawweight	Daniel Soriano	def.	Joel Flores	Submission (armbar)	1	1:12
Featherweight	Jimmy Padilla	def.	Thomas Vievering	Submission (armbar)	1	2:11

=== Legacy Fighting Alliance 51: Gibson vs. Erak ===
Legacy Fighting Alliance 51: Gibson vs. Erak
- Promotion: Legacy Fighting Alliance
- Date: September 28, 2018
- Venue: Selland Arena
- City: Fresno, California, U.S.

Event chronology
Legacy Fighting Alliance 50: Allen vs. Hiley	Legacy Fighting Alliance 51: Gibson vs. Erak	Legacy Fighting Alliance 52: Rodriguez vs. Gutiérrez

Legacy Fighting Alliance 51: Gibson vs. Erak was the fifty-second event of Legacy Fighting Alliance and took place on September 28, 2018. It aired on AXS TV.

Results

Main Card
Weight class				Method	Round	Time	Notes
Bantamweight	Cody Gibson	def.	Gustavo Erak	Decision (unanimous)	3	5:00
Bantamweight	Nohelin Hernandez	def.	Rolando Velasco	Decision (unanimous)	3	5:00
Light Heavyweight	Jordan Powell	def.	Andres Alcantar	TKO (injury)	2	4:00
Welterweight	Joaquin Lopez	def.	Salaiman Ahmadyar	KO (punches)	1	1:13
Middleweight	Kailan Hill	def.	Adam Fugitt	KO (punch)	1	1:31
Flyweight	Paul Elizondo	def.	Freddy Mendez	TKO (punches)	1	1:46
Preliminary Card
Flyweight	Victor Gallegos	def.	Carlos Hernandez	Submission (guillotine choke)	1	1:16

=== Legacy Fighting Alliance 52: Rodriguez vs. Gutiérrez ===
Legacy Fighting Alliance 52: Rodriguez vs. Gutiérrez
- Promotion: Legacy Fighting Alliance
- Date: October 19, 2018
- Venue: Bell County Expo Center
- City: Belton, Texas, U.S.

Event chronology
Legacy Fighting Alliance 51: Gibson vs. Erak	Legacy Fighting Alliance 52: Rodriguez vs. Gutiérrez	Legacy Fighting Alliance 53: Royval vs. Kenney

Legacy Fighting Alliance 52: Rodriguez vs. Gutiérrez was the fifty-third event of Legacy Fighting Alliance and took place on October 19, 2018. It aired on AXS TV.

Results

Main Card
Weight class				Method	Round	Time	Notes
Bantamweight	Chris Gutiérrez	def.	Ray Rodriguez	Submission (rear-naked choke)	1	4:47
Catchweight (130 lbs)	Jimmy Flick	def.	Cee Jay Hamilton	Submission (arm-triangle choke)	2	4:09
Middleweight	Punahele Soriano	def.	Jhonoven Pati	Submission (rear-naked choke)	1	3:36
Heavyweight	Vernon Lewis	def.	Jeremy Hardy	TKO (knees and punches)	3	0:51
Women's Strawweight	Itzel Esquivel	def.	Vanessa Demopoulos	Decision (unanimous)	3	5:00
Bantamweight	Armando Villarreal	def.	Jose Johnson	Decision (unanimous)	3	5:00
Preliminary Card
Women's Flyweight	Hailey Cowan	def.	Sha Whittington	TKO (punches)	1	1:09
Women's Strawweight	Desiree Yanez	def.	Fatima Mallett	KO (punch)	1	2:11
Flyweight	David Miramontes	def.	Robert Casper	Submission (rear-naked choke)	1	2:00

=== Legacy Fighting Alliance 53: Royval vs. Kenney ===
Legacy Fighting Alliance 53: Royval vs. Kenney
- Promotion: Legacy Fighting Alliance
- Date: November 9, 2018
- Venue: Comerica Theater
- City: Phoenix, Arizona, U.S.

Event chronology
Legacy Fighting Alliance 52: Rodriguez vs. Gutiérrez	Legacy Fighting Alliance 53: Royval vs. Kenney	Legacy Fighting Alliance 54: Mazo vs. Yariwaki

Legacy Fighting Alliance 53: Royval vs. Kenney was the fifty-fourth event of Legacy Fighting Alliance and took place on November 9, 2018. It aired on AXS TV.

Results

Main Card
Weight class				Method	Round	Time	Notes
Flyweight	Casey Kenney	def.	Brandon Royval	Decision (unanimous)	5	5:00	(Note: For the interim LFA Flyweight Championship.)
Welterweight	Kyle Stewart	def.	Braden Smith	Decision (unanimous)	3	5:00
Featherweight	Kamuela Kirk	def.	Kevin Croom	Submission (triangle choke)	1	3:54
Featherweight	Andrew Tenneson	def.	Joey Miolla	Decision (unanimous)	3	5:00
Lightweight	Harvey Park	def.	Le'Ville Simpson	Decision (unanimous)	3	5:00
Bantamweight	Kevin Natividad	def.	Tom Ni	Decision (unanimous)	3	5:00
Preliminary Card
Catchweight (165 lbs)	LaRue Burley	def.	Manny Villareal	Decision (unanimous)	3	5:00
Lightweight	Ryan Shell	def.	Jimmy Scully	TKO (punches)	1	1:43
Bantamweight	Hunter Azure	def.	A.J. Robb	Decision (unanimous)	3	5:00

=== Legacy Fighting Alliance 54: Mazo vs. Yariwaki ===
Legacy Fighting Alliance 54: Mazo vs. Yariwaki
- Promotion: Legacy Fighting Alliance
- Date: November 16, 2018
- Venue: Costa Mesa Hall at the OC Fair & Event Center
- City: Costa Mesa, California, U.S.

Event chronology
Legacy Fighting Alliance 53: Royval vs. Kenney	Legacy Fighting Alliance 54: Mazo vs. Yariwaki	Legacy Fighting Alliance 55: Johns vs. Yañez

Legacy Fighting Alliance 54: Mazo vs. Yariwaki was the fifty-fifth event of Legacy Fighting Alliance and took place on November 16, 2018. It aired on AXS TV.

Results

Main Card
Weight class				Method	Round	Time	Notes
Women's Flyweight	Sabina Mazo (c)	def.	Carol Yariwaki	Decision (unanimous)	5	5:00	(Note: For the LFA Women's Flyweight Championship.)
Middleweight	Moses Murrietta	def.	Sidiah Parker	KO (punch)	2	4:33
Bantamweight	Vincent Cachero	def.	Joe Murphy	Decision (unanimous)	3	5:00
Lightweight	Jacob Rosales	def.	Ricardo Seixas	TKO (punches)	1	1:56
Heavyweight	Irvins Ayala	def.	Mitchell Sipe	TKO (doctor stoppage)	1	1:04
Middleweight	Kailan Hill	def.	Andre Walker	KO (spinning back fist)	1	0:11
Postliminary Card
Catchweight (160 lbs)	Jean-Paul Le-Bosnoyani	def.	Eugene Cacho	Submission (triangle choke)	2	3:14

=== Legacy Fighting Alliance 55: Johns vs. Yañez ===
Legacy Fighting Alliance 55: Johns vs. Yañez
- Promotion: Legacy Fighting Alliance
- Date: November 30, 2018
- Venue: The Bomb Factory
- City: Dallas, Texas, U.S.

Event chronology
Legacy Fighting Alliance 54: Mazo vs. Yariwaki	Legacy Fighting Alliance 55: Johns vs. Yañez	Legacy Fighting Alliance 56: Hubbard vs. Mota

Legacy Fighting Alliance 55: Johns vs. Yañez was the fifty-sixth event of Legacy Fighting Alliance and took place on November 30, 2018. It aired on AXS TV.

Results

Main Card
Weight class				Method	Round	Time	Notes
Bantamweight	Miles Johns	def.	Adrian Yañez	Decision (split)	5	5:00	(Note: For the vacant LFA Bantamweight Championship.)
Women's Bantamweight	Sarah Alpar	def.	Joselyne Edwards	Decision (split)	5	5:00	(Note: For the inaugural LFA Women's Bantamweight Championship.)
Bantamweight	Raufeon Stots	def.	Levi Mowles	Decision (unanimous)	3	5:00
Welterweight	Justin Patterson	def.	Ramiz Brahimaj	Decision (unanimous)	3	5:00
Catchweight (130 lbs)	Devin Miller	def.	Raul Garcia	TKO (punches)	1	3:29
Featherweight	Austin Lingo	def.	Aaron Webb	KO (punch)	1	0:13
Preliminary Card
Lightweight	James Wallace	def.	Sean Holden	Submission (triangle armbar)	1	1:20
Women's Flyweight	Hailey Cowan	def.	Jessica Sotack	KO (head kick)	2	4:35
Amateur Bouts
Flyweight	Xavier Franklin	def.	Jacob James	KO (punch)	1	2:02
Lightweight	Manuel Darnell	def.	Josael Fuentes	Submission (armbar)	1	1:26
Featherweight	Mark Lorello	def.	Jacorien Walker	Submission (arm-triangle choke)	2	2:20
Postliminary Card
Flyweight	Victor Altamirano	def.	Isaiah Gutierrez	Submission (D'arce choke)	2	3:56

=== Legacy Fighting Alliance 56: Hubbard vs. Mota ===
Legacy Fighting Alliance 56: Hubbard vs. Mota
- Promotion: Legacy Fighting Alliance
- Date: December 7, 2018
- Venue: Mystic Lake Casino Hotel
- City: Prior Lake, Minnesota, U.S.

Event chronology
Legacy Fighting Alliance 55: Johns vs. Yañez	Legacy Fighting Alliance 56: Hubbard vs. Mota	Legacy Fighting Alliance 57: Zalal vs. Mariscal

Legacy Fighting Alliance 56: Hubbard vs. Mota was the fifty-seventh event of Legacy Fighting Alliance and took place on December 7, 2018. It aired on AXS TV.

Results

Main Card
Weight class				Method	Round	Time	Notes
Lightweight	Austin Hubbard	def.	Killys Mota	TKO (punches)	5	4:45	(Note: For the vacant LFA Lightweight Championship.)
Catchweight (165 lbs)	Demarques Jackson	def.	Bobby Lee	Submission (guillotine choke)	1	2:11
Welterweight	Jonathon Thomson	def.	Ange Loosa	Decision (split)	3	5:00
Light Heavyweight	Alton Cunningham	def.	Erick Murray	TKO (punches)	2	1:53
Featherweight	Youssef Zalal	def.	Steven Merrill	Submission (D'arce choke)	1	3:22
Middleweight	Dante Schiro	def.	Robert Gidron	Submission (arm-triangle choke)	1	2:25
Preliminary Card
Bantamweight	Sean McPadden	def.	Jesse Wannemacher	Submission (rear-naked choke)	1	1:25
Catchweight (175 lbs)	Joel Bauman	def.	Corey Davis	Decision (majority)	3	5:00
Amateur Bouts
Heavyweight	Tommy Petersen	def.	Chato Wiest	TKO (punches)	1	0:17
Catchweight (160 lbs)	Noah Landrus	def.	Ryan Schafer	Decision (unanimous)	3	3:00
Women's Strawweight	Rachael Lippert	def.	Amanda Byers	Decision (split)	3	3:00
Middleweight	Nick Klein	def.	Manatua Lemaire	Submission (rear-naked choke)	1	2:39
Welterweight	Joshua Fleck	def.	Dick Legus	Submission (armbar)	1	2:43
