= Muhammad Ibrahim Khan =

Muhammad Ibrahim Khan may refer to:

- Sardar Muhammad Ibrahim Khan (1915–2003), founder and first President of Azad Kashmir
- Muhammad Ibrahim Khan (judge, died 1963), Judicial Commissioner of the Peshawar High Court
- Muhammad Ibrahim Khan (judge, born 1962), Justice of the Peshawar High Court
- Mohammad Ibrahim Khan Jhagra, Pakistani politician
- Muhammad Ibrahim Khan Khattak, member of the Pakistani parliament
- Muhammad Ibrahim Khan (Hazara leader)
- Muhammad Ibrahim Khan (Pakistani senator)
