= Haris Ibrahimovic =

Finnish footballer (born 1998)

Personal information
- Date of birth: 17 February 1998 (age 28)
- Place of birth: Tampere, Finland
- Height: 1.83 m (6 ft 0 in)
- Positions: Winger; forward

Team information
- Current team: KFC Duffel
- Number: 9

Youth career
- Ilves

Senior career*
Years	Team	Apps	(Gls)
2016	Ilves II	9	(1)
2016	Ashdod	2	(0)
2017–2018	HIFK 2	25	(6)
2019	Tampere United	20	(5)
2020	Espoo	7	(5)
2020	Oberneuland	3	(0)
2020	→ Oberneuland II (loan)	1	(3)
2021–2022	Dekani	12	(2)
2023–2024	Berchem Sport	15	(1)
2024–	KFC Duffel		
- * Club domestic league appearances and goals

Haris Ibrahimovic (born 17 February 1998) is a Finnish footballer who plays as a midfielder or winger for KFC Duffel.

== Career ==
Ibrahimovic started his career with Israeli top flight side Ashdod after trialing for Werder Bremen in the German Bundesliga, where he made 2 appearances and scored 0 goals. On 6 August 2016, he debuted for Ashdod during a 2–2 draw with Hapoel Ashkelon. Before the 2017 season, Ibrahimovic signed for Finnish fourth division club HIFK 2, helping them earn promotion to the Finnish third division. Before the 2019 season, he signed for Tampere United in the Finnish third division after trialing for Italian team Massese. In 2020, he signed for FC Oberneuland in the German fourth division. In 2021, Ibrahimovic signed for Slovenian second division outfit Dekani.
