= Ibrahim Hussein =

Ibrahim Hussein may refer to:

- Ibrahim Hussein (artist) (1936–2009), Malaysian artist
- Ibrahim Hussein (runner) (born 1958), Kenyan long-distance runner
- Ibrahim Al Hussein (born 1988), Syrian swimmer
- Ibrahim Hussein (footballer) (born 1975), Sudanese football manager and former player
