= Ibrahim Abu el-Hawa =

Palestinian activist

- ابراهيم ابو الهوى
- Born: December 24, 1942 (age 82); Jerusalem, Mandatory Palestine

Ibrahim Abu el-Hawa (Arabic: ابراهيم ابو الهوى; born December 24, 1942) is a Palestinian peace activist.

== Early life and career ==
Abu el-Hawa's family, who are of Bedouin descent, lived on the Mount of Olives for 1400 years. El-Hawa was born into a home built by his grandfather's grandfather. As a child, hospitality was prized by his family, who frequently hosted strangers in their home. His family worked as farmers, and as a child el-Hawa took care of the family cows. In addition to Arabic, he also learned Russian from a local Russian church.

Abu el-Hawa first traveled outside of Palestine after marrying his wife. On their honeymoon, the couple visited Manhattan.

Abu el-Hawa worked for Egged as a mechanic, and later as an engineer and cable-laying technician for Bezeq, where he worked for 27 years. He retired in 1999.

== Hostel ==
After the Six-Day War in 1967, Abu el-Hawa's grandfather opened a hostel called the Peace House out of the family's home, in which guests were able to stay free of charge. Abu el-Hawa has continued operating the Peace House, which is funded by donations.

=== Unapproved construction fines ===
In 1995, he built a second house on his property to accommodate his family, leaving the main house for guests. The second house hosted him and his wife, six of his children and their spouses, 25 grandchildren, and three adopted siblings.

In 2008, needing more space, the family began construction to build two additional apartments in the structure. In 2011, el-Hawa was charged with a NIS 2.5 million fine for unapproved construction on the building where he and his family live. By 2014, a crowdfunding campaign had raised enough money for el-Hawa to pay off part of the fine, allowing him to avoid prison time.

== Activism ==
Abu el-Hawa has worked with multiple Jewish activists and coexistence organizations, including Menachem Froman, the Jerusalem Peacemakers, and The Abrahamic Reunion.

== Personal life ==
Abu el-Hawa has eight children, two of whom live in the United States with their five children. The siblings moved to the United States in 1985 on student visas, and attended school in North Carolina.

In 2011, el-Hawa suffered a stroke.
