= Ramiz Brahimaj =

American mixed martial arts fighter

- Born: November 17, 1992 (age 33); The Bronx, New York City, United States
- Height: 5 ft 10 in (1.78 m)
- Weight: 170 lb (77 kg; 12 st 2 lb)
- Division: Welterweight
- Reach: 72 in (183 cm)
- Fighting out of: Dallas, Texas
- Team: Valle Flow Striking
- Years active: 2014–present

Mixed martial arts record
- Total: 20
- Wins: 13
- By knockout: 1
- By submission: 12
- Losses: 7
- By knockout: 2
- By decision: 5

Other information
- Mixed martial arts record from Sherdog

Ramiz Brahimaj (born November 17, 1992) is an American mixed martial artist who competes in the Welterweight division of the Ultimate Fighting Championship.

== Background ==
Brahimaj started training seriously for MMA when he was 17 while he was a junior in high school. He had always loved fighting and always loved the UFC.

Brahimaj is the son of Kosovar-Albanian parents.

== Mixed martial arts career ==
=== Early career ===
In his MMA debut, he faced Richard Bailey and submitted him via rear-naked choke in the first round. Brahimaj also tapped out his next three opponents that included wins over Josh Sturgill and David Lopez. Then in his promotional debut with Legacy Fighting Alliance at LFA 28, he submitted Sidney Ben Simmons in round one. Brahimaj tapped out Bilal Williams via rear-naked choke in the first round at LFA 33. He lost his first bout against Evan Cutts at LFA 40 via unanimous decision.

Brahimaj faced UFC veteran William Macário at LFA 47 and won by way of guillotine choke in the second round. After losing to Justin Patterson at LFA 55 via unanimous decision, Brahimaj tapped out Carlos Martinez in the first round via arm-triangle choke at LFA 62.

After being booked against Miguel Baeza on Dana White's Contender Series, a tumor was found behind his left eye in his preliminary testing for the bout and had to have surgery to remove it.

=== Ultimate Fighting Championship ===
Brahimaj was scheduled to face Takashi Sato on June 27, 2020 at UFC on ESPN 12 but the fight was scratched due to one of Brahimaj's cornermen testing positive for COVID-19.

Brahimaj made his UFC debut against Max Griffin on November 7, 2020, at UFC on ESPN 17. He lost the fight via technical knockout due to a doctor stoppage after Brahimaj's ear was split open in round three.

Brahimaj faced Sasha Palatnikov on August 21, 2021, at UFC on ESPN 29. He won the fight via technical submission due to a rear-naked choke in round one.

Brahimaj faced Court McGee on January 15, 2022, at UFC on ESPN 32. He lost the fight via unanimous decision.

Brahimaj, as a replacement for Jonny Parsons, faced Micheal Gillmore on February 26, 2022, at UFC Fight Night 202. He won the fight via rear-naked choke submission in round one.

Brahimaj was scheduled to face Michael Morales on July 30, 2022, at UFC 277. However, Brahimaj was forced out the event in mid July due to an undisclosed injury.

Brahimaj was scheduled to face Carlston Harris on February 18, 2023, at UFC Fight Night 219. However, Brahimaj was pulled from the event citing neck injury.

Brahimaj faced Themba Gorimbo on May 18, 2024, at UFC Fight Night 241. He lost the bout by unanimous decision.

Brahimaj faced Mickey Gall on November 16, 2024 at UFC 309. He won the fight by knockout in the first round. This fight earned him his first Performance of the Night award.

Brahimaj was scheduled to face Oban Elliott on May 31, 2025 at UFC on ESPN 68. However, Elliott had to withdraw due to visa issues and was replaced by Billy Ray Goff. Brahimaj defeated Goff via a guillotine choke submission in the first round. This fight earned him another Performance of the Night award.

Brahimaj faced Austin Vanderford on October 4, 2025 at UFC 320. He won the fight via a guillotine choke submission in the second round.

Brahimaj faced Punahele Soriano on February 21, 2026 at UFC Fight Night 267. He lost the fight by unanimous decision.

Brahimaj faced Neil Magny on August 15, 2026 at UFC 330. He lost the fight by technical knockout in the second round.

== Championships and accomplishments ==
=== Mixed martial arts ===
- Ultimate Fighting Championship
  - Performance of the Night (Two times) vs. Mickey Gall and Billy Ray Goff

== Mixed martial arts record ==
Professional record breakdown
20 matches	13 wins	7 losses
By knockout	1	2
By submission	12	0
By decision	0	5

Res.	Record	Opponent	Method	Event	Date	Round	Time	Location	Notes
Loss	13–7	Neil Magny	TKO (punches)	UFC 330	August 15, 2026	2	3:20	Philadelphia, Pennsylvania, United States	
Loss	13–6	Punahele Soriano	Decision (unanimous)	UFC Fight Night: Strickland vs. Hernandez	February 21, 2026	3	5:00	Houston, Texas, United States	
Win	13–5	Austin Vanderford	Submission (guillotine choke)	UFC 320	October 4, 2025	2	2:24	Las Vegas, Nevada, United States	
Win	12–5	Billy Ray Goff	Technical Submission (guillotine choke)	UFC on ESPN: Gamrot vs. Klein	May 31, 2025	1	3:16	Las Vegas, Nevada, United States	Performance of the Night.
Win	11–5	Mickey Gall	KO (punches)	UFC 309	November 16, 2024	1	2:55	New York City, New York, United States	Performance of the Night.
Loss	10–5	Themba Gorimbo	Decision (unanimous)	UFC Fight Night: Barboza vs. Murphy	May 18, 2024	3	5:00	Las Vegas, Nevada, United States	
Win	10–4	Micheal Gillmore	Submission (rear-naked choke)	UFC Fight Night: Makhachev vs. Green	February 26, 2022	1	2:02	Las Vegas, Nevada, United States	
Loss	9–4	Court McGee	Decision (unanimous)	UFC on ESPN: Kattar vs. Chikadze	January 15, 2022	3	5:00	Las Vegas, Nevada, United States	
Win	9–3	Sasha Palatnikov	Technical Submission (rear-naked choke)	UFC on ESPN: Cannonier vs. Gastelum	August 21, 2021	1	2:33	Las Vegas, Nevada, United States	
Loss	8–3	Max Griffin	TKO (doctor stoppage)	UFC on ESPN: Santos vs. Teixeira	November 7, 2020	3	2:03	Las Vegas, Nevada, United States	
Win	8–2	Carlos Martinez	Submission (arm-triangle choke)	LFA 62	March 22, 2019	1	0:55	Dallas, Texas, United States	
Loss	7–2	Justin Patterson	Decision (unanimous)	LFA 55	November 30, 2018	3	5:00	Dallas, Texas, United States	
Win	7–1	William Macário	Technical Submission (guillotine choke)	LFA 47	August 10, 2018	2	2:34	Dallas, Texas, United States	
Loss	6–1	Evan Cutts	Decision (unanimous)	LFA 40	May 25, 2018	3	5:00	Dallas, Texas, United States	
Win	6–0	Bilal Williams	Submission (rear-naked choke)	LFA 33	February 16, 2018	1	4:10	Dallas, Texas, United States	
Win	5–0	Ben Simons	Submission (guillotine choke)	LFA 28	December 8, 2017	1	0:46	Dallas, Texas, United States	Catchweight (175 lb) bout.
Win	4–0	Josh Sturgill	Submission (guillotine choke)	Xtreme Knockout 37	August 12, 2017	1	0:24	Dallas, Texas, United States	
Win	3–0	Andrew Sosa	Submission (rear-naked choke)	Xtreme Knockout 36	June 10, 2017	1	0:55	Dallas, Texas, United States	
Win	2–0	David Lopez	Submission (kimura)	Xtreme Knockout 34	January 28, 2017	1	0:20	Dallas, Texas, United States	
Win	1–0	Richard Bailey	Submission (rear-naked choke)	Genesis Combat Sports 1	October 25, 2014	1	2:17	Abilene, Texas, United States	Welterweight debut.

== See also ==
- List of current UFC fighters
- List of male mixed martial artists
