= UFC Fight Night: Barboza vs. Murphy =

2024 mixed martial event in Nevada, US

- The poster for UFC Fight Night: Barboza vs. Murphy
- Promotion: Ultimate Fighting Championship
- Date: May 18, 2024
- Venue: UFC Apex
- City: Enterprise, Nevada, United States
- Attendance: Not announced

Event chronology
UFC on ESPN: Lewis vs. Nascimento	UFC Fight Night: Barboza vs. Murphy	UFC 302: Makhachev vs. Poirier

UFC Fight Night: Barboza vs. Murphy (also known as UFC Fight Night 241, UFC on ESPN+ 99 and UFC Vegas 92) was a mixed martial arts event produced by the Ultimate Fighting Championship that took place on May 18, 2024, at the UFC Apex facility, in Enterprise, Nevada, part of the Las Vegas Metropolitan Area, United States.

== Background ==
A featherweight bout between Edson Barboza and Lerone Murphy headlined the event.

A women's bantamweight bout between Hailey Cowan and Tamires Vidal was expected to take place at the event. They were originally scheduled to meet at UFC on ESPN: Vera vs. Sandhagen in March 2023, but Vidal pulled out due to undisclosed medical reasons. In turn, Cowan was pulled from the event due to a broken leg and replaced by Melissa Gatto.

Former UFC Flyweight Championship challenger (also The Ultimate Fighter: Tournament of Champions flyweight winner) Tim Elliott and Tatsuro Taira was expected to take place at the event. However, Elliott withdrew due to an undisclosed injury and Taira was rescheduled against Joshua Van at UFC 302.

A light heavyweight bout between Oumar Sy and Rodolfo Bellato was scheduled for this event. However, Bellato withdrew for unknown reasons and was replaced by Antonio Trócoli. In turn, Trócoli was replaced by promotional newcomer Tuco Tokkos for undisclosed reasons.

== Results ==
Main card (ESPN+)
Weight class				Method	Round	Time	Notes
Featherweight	Lerone Murphy	def.	Edson Barboza	Decision (unanimous) (49–46, 50–45, 50–45)	5	5:00
Welterweight	Khaos Williams	def.	Carlston Harris	KO (punch)	1	1:30
Welterweight	Themba Gorimbo	def.	Ramiz Brahimaj	Decision (unanimous) (30–27, 30–27, 30–27)	3	5:00
Bantamweight	Adrian Yañez	def.	Vinicius Salvador	TKO (punches)	1	2:47
Women's Strawweight	Angela Hill	def.	Luana Pinheiro	Submission (guillotine choke)	2	4:12
Preliminary card (ESPN+)
Lightweight	Tom Nolan	def.	Victor Martinez	TKO (knee to the body and punches)	1	3:50
Light Heavyweight	Oumar Sy	def.	Tuco Tokkos	Submission (face crank)	1	3:43
Women's Bantamweight	Melissa Gatto	def.	Tamires Vidal	TKO (punch to the body)	3	0:37
Middleweight	Abusupiyan Magomedov	def.	Warlley Alves	Decision (unanimous) (30–26, 30–26, 30–26)	3	5:00
Women's Strawweight	Ariane Carnelossi	def.	Piera Rodríguez	DQ (headbutts)	2	3:16
Bantamweight	Alateng Heili	def.	Kleydson Rodrigues	Decision (unanimous) (30–27, 30–27, 29–28)	3	5:00
Women's Strawweight	Vanessa Demopoulos	def.	Emily Ducote	Decision (split) (28–29, 29–28, 29–28)	3	5:00

== Bonus awards ==
The following fighters received $50,000 bonuses.

- Fight of the Night: Lerone Murphy vs. Edson Barboza
- Performance of the Night: Khaos Williams and Angela Hill

== See also ==
- 2024 in UFC
- List of current UFC fighters
- List of UFC events
