= Adem İbrahimoğlu =

Turkish footballer

Personal information
- Full name: Adem İbrahimoğlu
- Date of birth: 2 January 1957 (age 69)
- Place of birth: Bitola, Yugoslavia
- Position: Goalkeeper

Senior career*
Years	Team	Apps	(Gls)
1976–1979	Eskişehirspor	42	(0)
1979–1981	Fenerbahçe	59	(0)
1981–1986	Beşiktaş	69	(0)
1986–1987	Antalyaspor	10	(0)
1987–1989	Bakırköyspor	25	(0)
1989–1990	Gaziosmanpaşaspor	0	(0)
1990–1991	Nişantaşıspor	40	(0)
1991–1992	Elazığspor	8	(0)

International career^{‡}
1982	Turkey U21	1	(0)
1983	Turkey	3	(0)
- * Club domestic league appearances and goals as of 5 December 2020 ‡ National team caps and goals as of 5 December 2020

Adem İbrahimoğlu (born 1 January 1957, Bitola, Yugoslavia) was a Turkish professional footballer who played as a goalkeeper.

== Career ==
He played 3 international matches which were all of them 1984 European Championship qualifiers and conceded 6 goals in these matches in 1983. In one of them he conceded 1 goal from a penalty kick in the match against Germany (lost by 1:5) on 26 March 1983.

== Club and manager career ==
İbrahimoğlu, who transferred to Eskişehirspor and had a successful performance here, is a football player who was the goalkeeper of Fenerbahçe in the 1978-81 seasons and Beşiktaş in the 1981-86 seasons. In Turkey national football team also worked in the same period Adam İbrahimoğlu, then Antalyaspor (1986–87), Bakirköyspor (1987–89), Eyup (1989-1990), in Nişantaşıspor (1990–91) have played and Elazığspor'un (1991 -1992) started to coach after quitting football. In 1996-98, he worked as the goalkeeper coach of the national team in Fatih Terim's team. Later, Çanakkale Dardanelspor worked as a goalkeeper coach in Beşiktaş youth team during the 2005-2006 season.

== Successes ==
Beşiktaş

- Turkish Football Championship: 1982-19 and 1985-19
