= Ibrahim Al Hilbawi =

Egyptian lawyer and politician (1858–1940)

- Born: 1858; Kafr El Dawwar
- Died: 20 December 1940 (aged 81–82)
- Education: Al Azhar University
- Occupation: Lawyer
- Years active: 1870s–1940
- Known for: First president of the Bar Association in Egypt

Ibrahim Al Hilbawi (1858–1940) was an Egyptian jurist and politician. He is known for being the first president of the Bar Association.

== Early life and education ==
Al Hilbawi born in Kafr El Dawwar in 1858 into a Maghribi-origin family. His father was a merchant and farmer. Ibrahim received a degree in law from Al Azhar University. He became a follower of Jamal al Din Al Afghani whom he met in 1873.

== Career and political activities ==
After his graduation Al Hilbawi began to work as a lawyer in Tanta. He worked as a deputy editor of the official publication Journal Officiel of which the editor-in-chief was Muhammad Abduh. Al Hilbawi was the prosecuting lawyer in the trial of the Denshawai incident in 1906. He took part in the establishment of the Ummah Party in 1907.

Al Hilbawi became a member of the Muslim Benevolent Society. He was the prosecuting lawyer in the trial of Ibrahim Nasif Al Wardani who assassinated Boutros Ghali, Prime Minister of Egypt, in 1910. He was elected as the first president of the Bar Association in November 1912. He joined the Liberal Constitutional Party in the 1920s.

== Personal life and death ==
Al Hilbawi married in Kafr El Dawwar in 1880. After divorcing her in 1888 he married with a slave girl from the harem of Princess Jamila who was the daughter of Khedive Ismail. His second wife died next year, and he married again, but it ended in divorce soon. Al Hiblavi married for the fourth time in 1897. He died on 20 December 1940.
