= Abul Fadl Mohsin Ebrahim =

Seychellois scholar of Islamic bioethics

Abul Fadl Mohsin Ebrahim is a Seychellois scholar of Islamic bioethics and emeritus professor of Islamic Studies in the School of Religion and Theology at the University of KwaZulu-Natal in South Africa. He is a Senior Professor and researcher at the Regent Business School in Durban, South Africa and the Academic Research Director of the International Institute of Islamic Thought.

== Biography ==
Ebrahim, a Seychelles native, finished his initial studies on Islam at the Aleemiyah Institute of Islamic Studies in Karachi, Pakistan, in 1975, and then went on to receive a Bachelor of Theology (B.Th.) degree at Cairo's Al-Azhar University in 1977. He then went on to Temple University in Philadelphia, where he earned his M.A. and Ph.D. degrees in 1983 and 1986 respectively. He is currently serving as Professor Emeritus in the School of Religion, Philosophy and Classics at the University of KwaZulu-Natal; and a Senior Professor and Researcher at the REGENT Business School, in Durban, South Africa.

== Works ==
- Abortion, Birth Control and Surrogate Parenting: An Islamic Perspective (1989)
- Islamic Guidelines on Animals Experimentation (1992)
- Biomedical Issues: Islamic Perspective (1993)
- Ethics of Medical Research: Some Islamic Considerations (1994)
- Organ Transplantation: Contemporary Islamic Legal and Ethical Perspectives (1998)
- Organ transplantation, euthanasia, cloning and animal experimentation (2001)
- Reproductive Health and Islamic Values: Ethical and Legal Insights (2001)
- Muslims in Seychelles: A Historical Appraisal of Their Legacy (2016)
