= Mohammed Ibrahim (renegade Taliban leader) =

Mohammed Ibrahim (died July 5, 2006) was an Afghan rose to a leadership role in the Taliban, but renounced the organisation in 2006.

Accounts differ as to the role Ibrahim played in the Taliban's resistance to the new government in Afghanistan. Ibrahim claimed he had last fought in Afghanistan in 2001, and had then moved to Pakistan. Afghan and American spokespeople said they believed he had been orchestrating attacks until shortly before his apprehension.

Ibrahim claimed he was on his way to surrender, to take advantage of an amnesty program called "Peace through strength". when he was apprehended. At the time Ibrahim was terminally ill with liver disease. Canadian news sources report that conversations with Lieutenant Colonel Ian Hope, while he received Canadian medical treatment, played a role in his renunciation of the Taliban.

Ibrahim succumbed to his liver disease on July 5, 2006.
