= Mohamed Mahmoud Ibrahim =

Egyptian weightlifter

Personal information
- Nationality: Egyptian
- Born: 5 August 1937 (age 87); Ad-Daqahliyah, Egypt

Sport
- Sport: Weightlifting

Mohamed Mahmoud Ibrahim (born 5 August 1937) is an Egyptian weightlifter. He competed at the 1960 Summer Olympics and the 1964 Summer Olympics.
