= Muhammad Ibrahim Khan (judge, died 1963) =

Politician and judge (died 1963)

Justice Khan Bahadur Muhammad Ibrahim Khan (Urdu: خان بہادر ابراھیم خان) was the Chief Justice (Judicial Commissioner) of the Peshawar High Court from 1945 to 1955 and the 4th Governor of Khyber Pakhtunkhwa, then the North-West Frontier Province, from 14 January 1950 to 17 February 1950.

He was the Khan of Chenna belonging to an aristocratic family of Charsadda, Khyber Pakhtunkhwa. He was educated at Aligarh University, in British India, where he graduated with a degree in law. He was awarded the title Khan Bahadur by the then British Raj for his extraordinary work and service. Being a key player in the Pakistan Movement, he was a close ally of Muhammad Ali Jinnah and then Viceroy Lord Mountbatten. Ibrahim Khan was one of the judges who served on the Boundary Commission 1947 to demarcate the Pakistani and Indian territory. After the independence of Pakistan he served on several key positions, including the Evacuee Property Commissioner and played a key role in setting up the prestigious Burn Hall School in Abbottabad, Khyber-Pakhtunkhwa. After retirement Ibrahim Khan was appointed as the Chairman of the Public Service Commission in Karachi. He died in 1963 after prolonged illness.
