= Ilgar Ibrahimoglu =

Hacı İlqar İbrahimoğlu

Personal life
- Born: 5 November 1973 (age 53) Baku, Azerbaijan SSR, Soviet Union
- Other name: Ilgar Ali
- Website: ibrahimoglu.org

Religious life
- Religion: Islam
- Denomination: Shia Islam
- School: Usuli
- Sect: Twelver
- Jurisprudence: Ja'fari
- Profession: Islamic cleric, imam, theologian, philosopher, human rights activist, political activist

Muslim leader
- Based in: Baku, Azerbaijan
- Post: Imam-camaat of the Juma Mosque community (since 1992)
- Period in office: Since 2004
- Predecessor: Haji Azer Ramizoglu

Ilgar Ibrahimoglu (Note: Azerbaijani: İlqar İbrahimoğlu) (born 5 November 1973) is an Azerbaijani Islamic scholar and political activist who is the chairman of DEVAMM (the Centre for the Protection of Freedom of Conscience and Religion).

He has also been imam of the "Juma" mosque in Icheri-Sheher and Chief Editor of "Deyerler (Azerbaijan Islam News)" news portal.

== Early life ==
Ilqar Ibrahimoglu was born on 5 November 1973, in Baku, Azerbaijan. Since his childhood he was engaged in chess under the supervision of honored Azerbaijani trainer Oleg Isaakovich Privorotsky. In his youth he was a team captain in the intellectual game "What? Where? When?"( "Что? Где? Когда?"). He is a first-degree chess player, and received his education in economic sciences, philosophy and theology.

== Public career ==
He has written his dissertation on "The integration of Islamic and Western Philosophy". He is alumni of the Warsaw International School of Human Right, simultaneously he holds "International expert certificate on alcoholism and drug addiction". He is co-founder and coordinator of the social projects "Asma-ul-Husna" and "Yetimsiz Vətən" (Homeland without orphans), which are aim to take care of children with chronological blood diseases and to support the psychosocial rehabilitation and social integration of the children deprived of parental care. In the meanwhile, he is a supervisor of the "Hikmət Evi" (Wisdom House) dispute center, and "İslam Maarifi" (Islamic enlightenment) program. Also, he leads "Mədəniyyətlərin dialoqu" (Dialogs of the cultures) program, which is intend to improve tolerance, patience and cultural integration in the society. Ilgar Ibrahimoglu conducts interdisciplinary researches in the fields like theology, postmodern philosophy and philosophy of Human Rights.

According to The Royal Islamic Strategic Studies Center, Jordan, Ilgar Ibrahimoglu was among the most 500 influential Muslims in the world.

He also engaged in research about the role and place of the neuro-linguistic in the interpersonal interactions and in paradigmatic contacts. Within the frame of his researches he has visited several countries such as Austria, Poland, Turkey, United States, Russian Federation, Iran, Germany, Jordan, Switzerland, Ukraine, France and Italy.

In 2012, he has campaigned to stop male violence against women.

== Personal life ==
Married and has three children.
