= Muhammad Ibrahim (scholar) =

Bengali politician

Maulana Muhammad Ibrahim
- মোহাম্মদ ইব্রাহীম

Member of the Bengal Legislative Assembly
- In office 1937–1945
- Succeeded by: Fazlur Rahman
- Constituency: Noakhali North

Personal details
- Party: Krishak Praja Party

Religious life
- Religion: Islam
- Denomination: Sunni
- Jurisprudence: Hanafi

Muhammad Ibrahim (Bengali: মোহাম্মদ ইব্রাহীম) was a Bengali politician.

== Biography ==
Ibrahim joined the Krishak Praja Party, and was elected as a member of the Bengal Legislative Assembly for the Noakhali North constituency from 1937 to 1945. He was a member of the Madrasah Education Committee, and supported a request for the Government of Bengal to introduce a bill for the establishment of an Islamic university in Bengal.

Ibrahim was a former secretary of the Feni Alia Madrasa. He was also a Khilafat Movement activist.
