= 2015 in UFC =

Mixed martial arts events

Information
- First date: January 3
- Last date: December 19

Events
- Total events: 41
- UFC: 13
- UFC on Fox: 4
- UFC Fight Night: 22
- TUF Finale events: 2

Fights
- Total fights: 474
- Title fights: 20

Chronology
2014 in UFC	2015 in UFC	2016 in UFC

The year 2015 was the 23rd year in the history of the Ultimate Fighting Championship (UFC), a mixed martial arts promotion based in the United States.

== 2015 UFC.com awards ==
2015 UFC.COM Awards
No	Best Fighter	The Upsets	The Submissions	The Newcomers	The Knockouts	The Fights
1	Conor McGregor	Holly Holm defeats Ronda Rousey; UFC 193	Ronda Rousey defeats Cat Zingano; UFC 184	Holly Holm	Holly Holm defeats Ronda Rousey; UFC 193	Robbie Lawler defeats Rory MacDonald 2 UFC 189
2	Rafael dos Anjos	Rafael dos Anjos defeats Anthony Pettis; UFC 185	Godofredo Pepey defeats Andre Fili; UFC Fight Night: Maia vs. LaFlare	Tom Breese	Conor McGregor defeats José Aldo; UFC 194	Daniel Cormier defeats Alexander Gustafsson; UFC 192
3	Joanna Jędrzejczyk	Ryan Benoit defeats Sergio Pettis; UFC 185	Gilbert Burns defeats Alex Oliveira; UFC Fight Night: Maia vs. LaFlare	Sage Northcutt	Thiago Santos defeats Steve Bossé; UFC Fight Night: Machida vs. Romero	Tony Ferguson defeats Edson Barboza; The Ultimate Fighter: Team McGregor vs. Team Faber Finale
4	Holly Holm	Leonardo Santos defeats Kevin Lee; UFC 194	Thales Leites defeats Tim Boetsch; UFC 183	Joe Duffy	Paul Felder defeats Danny Castillo; UFC 182	Andrei Arlovski defeats Travis Browne; UFC 187
5	Daniel Cormier	Uriah Hall defeats Gegard Mousasi; UFC Fight Night: Barnett vs. Nelson	Tony Ferguson defeats Edson Barboza; The Ultimate Fighter: Team McGregor vs. Team Faber Finale	Makwan Amirkhani	Frankie Edgar defeats Chad Mendes; The Ultimate Fighter: Team McGregor vs. Team Faber Finale	John Lineker defeats Francisco Rivera; UFC 191
6	Luke Rockhold	Maryna Moroz defeats Joanne Calderwood; UFC Fight Night: Gonzaga vs. Cro Cop 2	Alex Chambers defeats Kailin Curran; UFC Fight Night: Miocic vs. Hunt	Kamaru Usman	Stephen Thompson defeats Jake Ellenberger; The Ultimate Fighter: American Top Team vs. Blackzilians Finale	Brian Ortega defeats Thiago Tavares; UFC Fight Night: Boetsch vs. Henderson
7	Demetrious Johnson	James Vick defeats Jake Matthews; UFC Fight Night: Miocic vs. Hunt	Joe Duffy defeats Ivan Jorge; UFC Fight Night: Bisping vs. Leites	Magomed Mustafaev	Andrei Arlovski defeats Travis Browne; UFC 187	Yair Rodríguez defeats Charles Rosa; UFC 188
8	Max Holloway	Dan Hooker defeats Hatsu Hioki; UFC Fight Night: Miocic vs. Hunt	Keita Nakamura defeats Li Jingliang; UFC Fight Night: Barnett vs. Nelson	Stevie Ray	Uriah Hall defeats Gegard Mousasi 1 UFC Fight Night: Barnett vs. Nelson	Edson Barboza defeats Paul Felder 1 UFC on Fox: Dillashaw vs. Barão 2
9	Tony Ferguson	Andrew Holbrook defeats Jake Matthews; UFC Fight Night: Whittaker vs. Brunson	Gunnar Nelson defeats Brandon Thatch; UFC 189	Alex Oliveira	Thomas Almeida defeats Brad Pickett; UFC 189	Nicolas Dalby defeats Darren Till; UFC Fight Night: Holohan vs. Smolka
10	Neil Magny	Patrick Cummins defeats Rafael Cavalcante; UFC 190	Aljamain Sterling defeats Takeya Mizugaki; UFC on Fox: Machida vs. Rockhold	Ben Nguyen	Matt Dwyer defeats William Macário; UFC Fight Night: Bigfoot vs. Mir	Gian Villante defeats Corey Anderson; UFC on Fox: Machida vs. Rockhold
Ref						

== 2015 by the numbers ==
The numbers below records the events, fights, techniques, champions and fighters held or performed for the year of 2015 in UFC.

Events
Number of Events	PPV	Continents	Countries	Cities	Fight Night Bonuses
41	13	5	13	32	163; Total $8,150,000
Longest Event	Shortest Event	Highest Income Live Gate	Lowest Income Live Gate	Highest Attendance	Lowest Attendance
The Ultimate Fighter Latin America 2 Finale: Magny vs. Gastelum 2:41:51	UFC 184 1:19:22	UFC 194 $10,100,000	UFC Fight Night: Namajunas vs. VanZant $234,725	UFC 193 56,214	UFC Fight Night: Namajunas vs. VanZant 1,643
Title Fights
Undisputed Title Fights	Title Changes	Champions Remained in Their Divisions	Number of Champions	Number of Interim Champions	Number of Title Defenses
19	4	3 FLW – Demetrious Johnson; BW – T.J. Dillashaw; WW – Robbie Lawler	11	1	12
Champions
Division	Beginning of The Year	End of The Year	Division	Beginning of The Year	End of The Year
Heavyweight	Cain Velasquez	Fabrício Werdum	Bantamweight	T.J. Dillashaw	T.J. Dillashaw
Light Heavyweight	Jon Jones	Daniel Cormier	Flyweight	Demetrious Johnson	Demetrious Johnson
Middleweight	Chris Weidman	Luke Rockhold	Women's Bantamweight	Ronda Rousey	Holly Holm
Welterweight	Robbie Lawler	Robbie Lawler	Women's Strawweight	Carla Esparza	Joanna Jędrzejczyk
Lightweight	Anthony Pettis	Rafael dos Anjos			
Featherweight	José Aldo	Conor McGregor			
Fights
Most Knockouts at A Single Event	Most submissions at A Single Event	Most Decisions at A Single Event	Total Number of Fights	Total Number of Cage Time	
UFC 185; UFC Fight Night: Boetsch vs. Henderson 7	UFC Fight Night: Maia vs. LaFlare; UFC Fight Night: Namajunas vs. VanZant 6	UFC Fight Night: Mir vs. Duffee; The Ultimate Fighter Latin America 2 Finale: Magny vs. Gastelum 9	474	83:33:40	
Fighters
Number of Fighters	UFC Debutants	Releases / Retired	Fighters Suspended	Number of Fighters Missed weight	
(At the end of Dec 31, 2015); 946	94	N/A	N/A	16	
Champion feats
Ronda Rousey's 14-second submission at UFC 184 set the record for the fastest submission in a UFC title fight.; Ronda Rousey's bout with Cat Zingano is the first title fight that resulted in no strikes landed by either opponent.; Rafael dos Anjos became the first Brazilian-born lightweight champion.; Joanna Jędrzejczyk became the first Polish-born UFC champion.; Ronda Rousey became the first fighter in UFC/Strikeforce/PRIDE/WEC history to win four title fights in under a minute.; Ronda Rousey's six consecutive finishes in title fights are the most in UFC history.; Ronda Rousey's five first-round finishes in title fights are the most in UFC history.; Conor McGregor became the first Irish-born UFC champion.; Conor McGregor's 13 second knockout at UFC 194 is the fastest finish in title fight history.; Rafael dos Anjos's 66-second knockout is the fastest finish in UFC lightweight championship history.
Fighter feats
Gleison Tibau competed in his seventh career split decision, the most in UFC history at the time, before Clay Guida surpassed the mark in December 2022 with eight.; Charles Rosa recorded the latest submission in a three‑round featherweight bout when he submitted Sean Soriano at 4:43 of the third round.; Makwan Amirkhani's eight‑second knockout was the fastest by a debuting featherweight and tied for the second‑fastest knockout in UFC/WEC featherweight history.; Ronda Rousey's 14-second submission at UFC 184 set the record for the fastest submission in modern UFC history.; Ronda Rousey's seven armbar victories are the most in UFC history and tie her with Antônio Rodrigo Nogueira for the most in UFC/Strikeforce/PRIDE/WEC combined history.; Jim Miller attempted his 34th submission which set the new record for the most in company history.; Demetrious Johnson's submission at 4:59 in the fifth round of UFC 186 set a new record for the latest submission in UFC history.; Valérie Létourneau became the first female to win in two weight divisions with her victory at UFC 186.; Joe Proctor's submission at 4:58 of the third round set the record for the latest submission in a three-round lightweight bout.; Patrick Williams' 23 second submission is the fastest in UFC/WEC bantamweight history.; With his submission victory at UFC Fight Night 69, Makwan Amirkhani became the first featherweight to earn a win without throwing or landing a strike.; At age 23, Max Holloway became the youngest fighter in UFC history to reach 10 career wins.; Josh Barnett's 75 significant clinch strikes are the most ever recorded in a UFC bout.; Holly Holm's head‑kick victory at UFC 193 was the first of its kind by a woman in UFC history.; Neil Magny became the first fighter in modern UFC history to compete five times twice in two consecutive calendar years.; Antônio Carlos Júnior and Kevin Casey competed in the shortest bout to end in a no‑contest when their fight was stopped 11 seconds into the first round at UFC Fight Night 80.; Rose Namajunas's fifth‑round submission at the 2:25 mark set the record for the latest submission victory in a women's strawweight bout.; Conor McGregor became the first fighter to earn five consecutive "Performance of the Night" bonus awards.

== Debut UFC fighters ==
The following fighters fought their first UFC fight in 2015:

ISO	Fighter	Division
(Spain)	Abner Lloveras	Lightweight
(Brazil)	Aleksandra Albu	Women's Strawweight
(Mexico)	Álvaro Herrera	Lightweight
(United States)	Alex Torres	Lightweight
(Brazil)	Alex Oliveira	Welterweight
(United States)	Andrew Holbrook	Lightweight
(United States)	Anthony Christodoulou	Lightweight
(Australia)	Anton Zafir	Welterweight
(England)	Arnold Allen	Featherweight
(Republic of Ireland)	Artem Lobov	Featherweight
(Poland)	Bartosz Fabinski	Welterweight
(United States)	Bentley Syler	Middleweight
(United States)	Bruno Rodrigues	Lightweight
(Paraguay)	Cesar Arzamendia	Lightweight
(United States)	Chris de la Rocha	Heavyweight
(United States)	Chris Gruetzemacher	Lightweight
(United States)	Cody Garbrandt	Bantamweight
(United States)	Cody Pfister	Lightweight
(United States)	Cortney Casey	Women's Strawweight
(Poland)	Damian Stasiak	Bantamweight
(United States)	Daniel Jolly	Light Heavyweight
(England)	Danny Roberts	Welterweight
(England)	Darren Till	Welterweight
(Brazil)	Dileno Lopes	Bantamweight
(United States)	Dominic Waters	Welterweight
(South Korea)	Dong Hyun Kim	Welterweight
(United States)	Dominique Steele	Welterweight
(Brazil)	Elizeu Zaleski dos Santos	Welterweight
(Peru)	Enrique Barzola	Featherweight
(Mexico)	Erick Montaño	Welterweight
(Brazil)	Ericka Almeida	Women's Strawweight
(Brazil)	Fernando Bruno	Lightweight
(United States)	Frankie Perez	Lightweight

ISO	Fighter	Division
(Cameroon)	Francis Ngannou	Heavyweight
(Colombia)	Fredy Serrano	Flyweight
(South Africa)	Garreth McLellan	Middleweight
(United States)	Geane Herrera	Flyweight
(Brazil)	Glaico França	Lightweight
(United States)	Hayder Hassan	Welterweight
(Mexico)	Horacio Gutierrez	Lightweight
(United States)	Holly Holm	Women's Bantamweight
(Russia)	Islam Makhachev	Lightweight
(Poland)	Izabela Badurek	Women's Strawweight
(United States)	Jared Cannonier	Heavyweight
(United States)	Jason Knight	Featherweight
(Mexico)	Jessica Aguilar	Women's Strawweight
(United States)	Jimmie Rivera	Bantamweight
(Brazil)	Joaquim Silva	Lightweight
(United States)	Jocelyn Jones-Lybarger	Women's Strawweight
(United States)	Joe Merritt	Welterweight
(United States)	Jonavin Webb	Welterweight
(Republic of Ireland)	Joseph Duffy	Lightweight
(United States)	Julian Erosa	Featherweight
(Nigeria)	Kamaru Usman	Welterweight
(Poland)	Karolina Kowalkiewicz	Women's Strawweight
(Russia)	Konstantin Erokhin	Heavyweight
(United States)	Leo Kuntz	Lightweight
(Georgia (country))	Levan Makashvili	Featherweight
(United States)	Lewis Gonzalez	Lightweight
(Poland)	Łukasz Sajewski	Lightweight
(Brazil)	Luis Henrique	Heavyweight
(Russia)	Magomed Mustafaev	Lightweight
(Finland)	Makwan Amirkhani	Featherweight
(Mexico)	Polo Reyes	Lightweight
(Poland)	Marcin Wrzosek	Featherweight
(United States)	Marion Reneau	Women's Bantamweight

ISO	Fighter	Division
(Ukraine)	Maryna Moroz	Women's Strawweight
(Mexico)	Masio Fullen	Featherweight
(Brazil)	Matheus Nicolau	Flyweight
(United States)	Michael Graves	Welterweight
(France)	Mickael Lebout	Lightweight
(Latvia)	Misha Cirkunov	Light Heavyweight
(Argentina)	Nazareno Malegarie	Featherweight
(Denmark)	Nicolas Dalby	Welterweight
(Nigeria)	Oluwale Bamgbose	Middleweight
(Republic of Ireland)	Paul Redmond	Featherweight
(Brazil)	Reginaldo Vieira	Bantamweight
(Chinese Taipei)	Rocky Lee	Featherweight
(United States)	Roger Zapata	Middleweight
(United States)	Ron Stallings	Middleweight
(United States)	Ryan Hall	Featherweight
(United States)	Sage Northcutt	Lightweight
(United States)	Scott Holtzman	Lightweight
(Russia)	Shamil Abdurakhimov	Heavyweight
(Sweden)	Sirwan Kakai	Bantamweight
(Canada)	Shane Campbell	Lightweight
(Canada)	Steve Bossé	Light Heavyweight
(Australia)	Steve Kennedy	Welterweight
(United States)	Steve Montgomery	Welterweight
(Scotland)	Stevie Ray	Lightweight
(Russia)	Sultan Aliev	Welterweight
(France)	Taylor Lapilus	Bantamweight
(Finland)	Teemu Packalen	Lightweight
(Japan)	Teruto Ishihara	Featherweight
(United States)	Timothy Johnson	Heavyweight
(England)	Tom Breese	Welterweight
(United States)	Tony Sims	Lightweight
(Kyrgyzstan)	Valentina Shevchenko	Women's Bantamweight
(Panama)	Vernon Ramos	Lightweight
(Brazil)	Vicente Luque	Welterweight
(Japan)	Yusuke Kasuya	Lightweight

== The Ultimate Fighter ==
The following The Ultimate Fighter seasons are scheduled for broadcast in 2015:

Season	Finale	Division	Winner	Runner-up
TUF 21: American Top Team vs. Blackzilians	July 12, 2015	Welterweight	Kamaru Usman	Hayder Hassan
TUF: Brazil 4	August 1, 2015	Lightweight	Glaico França	Fernando Bruno
TUF: Brazil 4	August 1, 2015	Bantamweight	Reginaldo Vieira	Dileno Lopes
TUF: Latin America 2	November 21, 2015	Welterweight	Erick Montaño	Enrique Marin
TUF: Latin America 2	November 21, 2015	Lightweight	Enrique Barzola	Horacio Gutiérrez
TUF 22: Team McGregor vs. Team Faber	December 11, 2015	Lightweight	Ryan Hall	Artem Lobov

== Title fights ==
Title fights in 2015
Weight class				Method	Round	Time	Event	Notes
Light Heavyweight	Jon Jones (c)	def.	Daniel Cormier	Decision (unanimous) (49–46, 49–46, 49–46)	5	5:00	UFC 182	(Note: For the UFC Light Heavyweight Championship.)
Women's Bantamweight	Ronda Rousey (c)	def.	Cat Zingano	Submission (straight armbar)	1	0:14	UFC 184	(Note: For the UFC Women's Bantamweight Championship.)
Women's Strawweight	Joanna Jędrzejczyk	def.	Carla Esparza (c)	TKO (punches)	2	4:17	UFC 185	(Note: For the UFC Women's Strawweight Championship.)
Lightweight	Rafael dos Anjos	def.	Anthony Pettis (c)	Decision (unanimous) (50–45, 50–45, 50–45)	5	5:00	UFC 185	(Note: For the UFC Lightweight Championship.)
Flyweight	Demetrious Johnson (c)	def.	Kyoji Horiguchi	Submission (armbar)	5	4:59	UFC 186	(Note: For the UFC Flyweight Championship. Latest finish in UFC history.)
Middleweight	Chris Weidman (c)	def.	Vitor Belfort	TKO (punches)	1	2:53	UFC 187	(Note: For the UFC Middleweight Championship.)
Light Heavyweight	Daniel Cormier	def.	Anthony Johnson	Submission (rear-naked choke)	3	2:39	UFC 187	(Note: For the vacant UFC Light Heavyweight Championship.)
Heavyweight	Fabrício Werdum (ic)	def.	Cain Velasquez (c)	Submission (guillotine choke)	3	2:13	UFC 188	(Note: For the UFC Heavyweight Championship.)
Women's Strawweight	Joanna Jędrzejczyk (c)	def.	Jessica Penne	TKO (punches and knee)	3	4:22	UFC Fight Night 69	(Note: For the UFC Women's Strawweight Championship.)
Welterweight	Robbie Lawler (c)	def.	Rory MacDonald	TKO (punches)	5	1:00	UFC 189	(Note: For the UFC Welterweight Championship.)
Featherweight	Conor McGregor	def.	Chad Mendes	TKO (punches)	2	4:57	UFC 189	(Note: For the interim UFC Featherweight Championship.)
Bantamweight	T.J. Dillashaw (c)	def.	Renan Barão	TKO (punches)	4	0:35	UFC on Fox 16	(Note: For the UFC Bantamweight Championship.)
Women's Bantamweight	Ronda Rousey (c)	def.	Bethe Correia	KO (punches)	1	0:34	UFC 190	(Note: For the UFC Women's Bantamweight Championship.)
Flyweight	Demetrious Johnson (c)	def.	John Dodson	Decision (unanimous) (49–46, 49–46, 50-45)	5	5:00	UFC 191	(Note: For the UFC Flyweight Championship.)
Light Heavyweight	Daniel Cormier (c)	def.	Alexander Gustafsson	Decision (split) (48-47, 47-48, 49-46)	5	5:00	UFC 192	(Note: For the UFC Light Heavyweight Championship.)
Women's Strawweight	Joanna Jędrzejczyk (c)	def.	Valérie Létourneau	Decision (unanimous) (49–46, 49–46, 50-45)	5	5:00	UFC 193	(Note: For the UFC Women's Strawweight Championship.)
Women's Bantamweight	Holly Holm	def.	Ronda Rousey (c)	KO (head kick and punches)	2	0:59	UFC 193	(Note: For the UFC Women's Bantamweight Championship.)
Middleweight	Luke Rockhold	def.	Chris Weidman (c)	TKO (punches)	4	3:12	UFC 194	(Note: For the UFC Middleweight Championship.)
Featherweight	Conor McGregor (ic)	def.	José Aldo (c)	KO (punch)	1	0:13	UFC 194	(Note: For the UFC Featherweight Championship. Latest fastest title finish in UFC history.)
Lightweight	Rafael dos Anjos (c)	def.	Donald Cerrone	TKO (body kick and punches)	1	1:06	UFC on Fox 17	(Note: For the UFC Lightweight Championship.)

== Events list ==
#	Event	Date	Venue	Location	Attendance
344	UFC on Fox: dos Anjos vs. Cerrone 2	Dec 19, 2015	Amway Center	Orlando, Florida, U.S.	14,459
343	UFC 194: Aldo vs. McGregor	Dec 12, 2015	MGM Grand Garden Arena	Las Vegas, Nevada, U.S.	16,516
342	The Ultimate Fighter: Team McGregor vs. Team Faber Finale	Dec 11, 2015	The Chelsea at The Cosmopolitan	Las Vegas, Nevada, U.S.	1,800
341	UFC Fight Night: Namajunas vs. VanZant	Dec 10, 2015	The Chelsea at The Cosmopolitan	Las Vegas, Nevada, U.S.	1,643
340	UFC Fight Night: Henderson vs. Masvidal	Nov 28, 2015	Olympic Gymnastics Arena	Seoul, South Korea	12,156
339	The Ultimate Fighter: Latin America 2 Finale	Nov 21, 2015	Arena Monterrey	Monterrey, Mexico	10,410
338	UFC 193: Rousey vs. Holm	Nov 15, 2015	Etihad Stadium	Melbourne, Victoria, Australia	56,214
337	UFC Fight Night: Belfort vs. Henderson 3	Nov 7, 2015	Ginásio do Ibirapuera	São Paulo, Brazil	10,628
336	UFC Fight Night: Holohan vs. Smolka	Oct 24, 2015	3Arena	Dublin, Ireland	—N/a
335	UFC 192: Cormier vs. Gustafsson	Oct 3, 2015	Toyota Center	Houston, Texas, U.S.	14,622
334	UFC Fight Night: Barnett vs. Nelson	Sep 27, 2015	Saitama Super Arena	Saitama, Japan	10,137
333	UFC 191: Johnson vs. Dodson 2	Sep 5, 2015	MGM Grand Garden Arena	Las Vegas, Nevada, U.S.	10,873
332	UFC Fight Night: Holloway vs. Oliveira	Aug 23, 2015	SaskTel Centre	Saskatoon, Saskatchewan, Canada	7,202
331	UFC Fight Night: Teixeira vs. Saint Preux	Aug 8, 2015	Bridgestone Arena	Nashville, Tennessee, U.S.	7,539
330	UFC 190: Rousey vs. Correia	Aug 1, 2015	HSBC Arena	Rio de Janeiro, Brazil	14,723
329	UFC on Fox: Dillashaw vs. Barão 2	Jul 25, 2015	United Center	Chicago, Illinois, U.S.	11,663
328	UFC Fight Night: Bisping vs. Leites	Jul 18, 2015	The SSE Hydro	Glasgow, Scotland, U.K.	10,451
327	UFC Fight Night: Mir vs. Duffee	Jul 15, 2015	Valley View Casino Center	San Diego, California, U.S.	5,471
326	The Ultimate Fighter: American Top Team vs. Blackzilians Finale	Jul 12, 2015	MGM Grand Garden Arena	Las Vegas, Nevada, U.S.	4,844
325	UFC 189: Mendes vs. McGregor	Jul 11, 2015	MGM Grand Garden Arena	Las Vegas, Nevada, U.S.	16,019
324	UFC Fight Night: Machida vs. Romero	Jun 27, 2015	Seminole Hard Rock Hotel and Casino	Hollywood, Florida, U.S.	5,604
323	UFC Fight Night: Jędrzejczyk vs. Penne	Jun 20, 2015	O_{2} World	Berlin, Germany	8,155
322	UFC 188: Velasquez vs. Werdum	Jun 13, 2015	Arena Ciudad de México	Mexico City, Mexico	21,036
321	UFC Fight Night: Boetsch vs. Henderson	Jun 6, 2015	Smoothie King Center	New Orleans, Louisiana, U.S.	6,231
320	UFC Fight Night: Condit vs. Alves	May 30, 2015	Goiânia Arena	Goiânia, Brazil	3,500
319	UFC 187: Johnson vs. Cormier	May 23, 2015	MGM Grand Garden Arena	Las Vegas, Nevada, U.S.	12,615
318	UFC Fight Night: Edgar vs. Faber	May 16, 2015	Mall of Asia Arena	Pasay, Philippines	13,446
317	UFC Fight Night: Miocic vs. Hunt	May 10, 2015	Adelaide Entertainment Centre	Adelaide, South Australia	7,984
316	UFC 186: Johnson vs. Horiguchi	Apr 25, 2015	Bell Centre	Montreal, Quebec, Canada	10,154
315	UFC on Fox: Machida vs. Rockhold	Apr 18, 2015	Prudential Center	Newark, New Jersey, U.S.	13,306
314	UFC Fight Night: Gonzaga vs. Cro Cop 2	Apr 11, 2015	Tauron Arena Kraków	Kraków, Poland	10,000
313	UFC Fight Night: Mendes vs. Lamas	Apr 4, 2015	Patriot Center	Fairfax, Virginia, U.S.	5,417
312	UFC Fight Night: Maia vs. LaFlare	Mar 21, 2015	Ginásio do Maracanãzinho	Rio de Janeiro, Brazil	7,707
311	UFC 185: Pettis vs. dos Anjos	Mar 14, 2015	American Airlines Center	Dallas, Texas, U.S.	17,160
310	UFC 184: Rousey vs. Zingano	Feb 28, 2015	Staples Center	Los Angeles, California, U.S.	17,654
309	UFC Fight Night: Bigfoot vs. Mir	Feb 22, 2015	Ginásio Gigantinho	Porto Alegre, Rio Grande do Sul, Brazil	5,080
308	UFC Fight Night: Henderson vs. Thatch	Feb 14, 2015	1stBank Center	Broomfield, Colorado, U.S.	5,807
307	UFC 183: Silva vs. Diaz	Jan 31, 2015	MGM Grand Garden Arena	Las Vegas, Nevada, U.S.	13,114
306	UFC on Fox: Gustafsson vs. Johnson	Jan 24, 2015	Tele2 Arena	Stockholm, Sweden	30,000
305	UFC Fight Night: McGregor vs. Siver	Jan 18, 2015	TD Garden	Boston, Massachusetts, U.S.	13,828
304	UFC 182: Jones vs. Cormier	Jan 3, 2015	MGM Grand Garden Arena	Las Vegas, Nevada, U.S.	11,575

== See also ==
- UFC
- List of UFC champions
- List of UFC events
