= Belal Muhammad =

American mixed martial artist (born 1988)

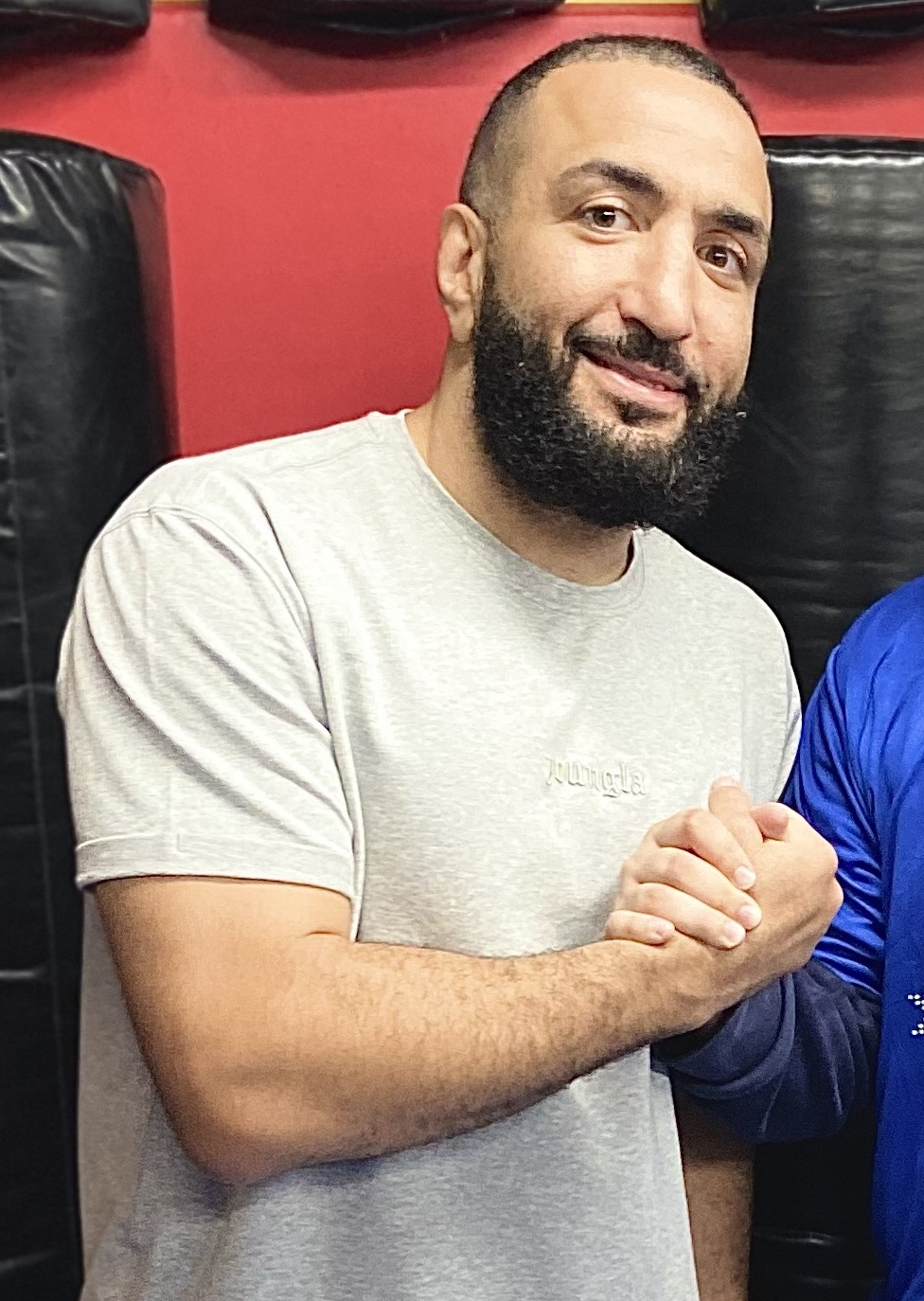
- Muhammad in 2023
- Born: July 9, 1988 (age 38); Chicago, Illinois, U.S.
- Nickname: Remember the Name
- Height: 5 ft 10 in (1.78 m)
- Weight: 170 lb (77 kg; 12 st)
- Division: Welterweight
- Reach: 72 in (183 cm)
- Fighting out of: Chicago, Illinois, U.S.
- Team: Roufusport (2013–present); Chicago Fight Team (2010–present); Valle Flow Striking
- Rank: Brown belt in Brazilian Jiu-Jitsu
- Years active: 2012–present

Mixed martial arts record
- Total: 31
- Wins: 24
- By knockout: 5
- By submission: 1
- By decision: 18
- Losses: 6
- By knockout: 1
- By decision: 5
- No contests: 1

Amateur MMA record
- Total: 2
- Wins: 2
- By decision: 2
- Losses: 0

Other information
- University: University of Illinois Urbana-Champaign
- Mixed martial arts record from Sherdog

Belal Muhammad (born July 9, 1988) is an American professional mixed martial artist who currently competes in the Welterweight division of the Ultimate Fighting Championship (UFC), where he is a former UFC Welterweight Champion. As of June 9, 2026, he is #7 in the Meta UFC welterweight rankings. A professional since 2012, he has also competed for Bellator and Titan FC.

== Background ==
Muhammad was born and raised in Chicago, Illinois, to Palestinian parents. He has four siblings: an older brother, older sister and two younger brothers. He wrestled at Bogan High School where he had future PFL champion Louis Taylor as his wrestling coach. Taylor was later instrumental in training Muhammad for the latter's amateur career. He studied to become a lawyer and graduated from the University of Illinois at Urbana-Champaign.

== Mixed martial arts career ==
Shortly after a TKO victory over Steve Carl to become the Titan Fighting Championships Welterweight Champion, and push his record to 9–0, Muhammad signed with the UFC in 2016.

=== Ultimate Fighting Championship ===
On July 7, 2016, at UFC Fight Night 90, Muhammad made his UFC debut, as a short-notice replacement, against Alan Jouban. He lost the fight via unanimous decision. Both participants were awarded Fight of the Night bonuses for their performances.

Muhammad next faced Augusto Montaño on September 17, 2016, at UFC Fight Night 94. He won the fight via TKO in the third round.

Muhammad was expected to face Lyman Good on November 12, 2016, at UFC 205. However, on October 24, Good was pulled from the card after being notified by USADA of a potential anti-doping violation stemming from an out-of-competition drug test sample collected ten days earlier. He was replaced by Vicente Luque. Muhammad lost the fight via knockout in the first round.

Muhammad was a short notice replacement and stepped in to face Randy Brown on February 11, 2017, at UFC 208. He won the fight by unanimous decision.

Muhammad faced Jordan Mein on July 8, 2017, at UFC 213. He won the fight by unanimous decision.

Muhammad was expected to face Jesse Taylor on November 19, 2017, at UFC Fight Night: Werdum vs. Tybura. However, on September 13, it was announced that Taylor was pulled from the card after being notified by USADA of a potential doping violation stemming from an out-of-competition drug test conducted on August 22. He was replaced by Tim Means. Muhammad won the fight via split decision.

Muhammad was expected to face Niko Price on June 1, 2018, at UFC Fight Night 131. However, Price was removed from the bout on May 22 for undisclosed reasons and replaced by promotional newcomer Chance Rencountre. Muhammad won the fight via unanimous decision.

Muhammad was scheduled to meet Elizeu Zaleski dos Santos on September 22, 2018, at UFC Fight Night 137. However, on September 14, 2018, Muhammad was pulled from the bout and he was replaced by newcomer Luigi Vendramini.

Muhammad faced Geoff Neal on January 19, 2019, at UFC Fight Night 143. He lost the fight by unanimous decision.

Muhammad faced Curtis Millender on April 13, 2019, at UFC 236. He won the fight by unanimous decision.

Muhammad faced Takashi Sato on September 7, 2019, at UFC 242. He won the fight via a rear-naked choke submission in the third round. This win earned Muhammad his first Performance of the Night award.

Muhammad was expected to face Lyman Good on April 18, 2020, at UFC 249. However, on April 4, Good pulled out due to COVID-19 infection. The bout was rebooked and eventually took place on June 20, 2020, at UFC on ESPN: Blaydes vs. Volkov. He won the fight via unanimous decision.

Muhammad was expected to face Sean Brady on December 19, 2020, at UFC Fight Night 183. However, in late October, Brady had a broken nose and had to pull out of their bout, and he was replaced by Dhiego Lima. Subsequently, Muhammed was diagnosed with COVID-19 during the week leading up to the event and the bout was scrapped from the card and the bout was rescheduled to February 13, 2021, at UFC 258 Muhammad won the fight via unanimous decision.

Muhammad faced Leon Edwards on March 13, 2021, at UFC Fight Night 187. During the second round, Edwards poked Muhammad in the eye rendering him unable to continue. The fight was declared a no contest.

Muhammad faced Demian Maia on June 12, 2021, at UFC 263. Muhammad won the fight via unanimous decision.

Muhammad faced Stephen Thompson on December 18, 2021, at UFC Fight Night: Lewis vs. Daukaus. He won the bout via unanimous decision.

Muhammad faced Vicente Luque in a rematch on April 16, 2022, at UFC on ESPN 34. He won the fight via unanimous decision.

Muhammad faced Sean Brady on October 22, 2022, at UFC 280. He won the bout via TKO stoppage at the end of the second round. UFC Hall of Famer and former UFC Lightweight Champion Khabib Nurmagomedov was one of his cornermen for this fight. He received his second Performance of the Night bonus.

Muhammad faced Gilbert Burns on May 6, 2023, at UFC 288. Muhammad won by unanimous decision.

==== UFC Welterweight Champion ====
Muhammad faced Leon Edwards in a rematch, for the UFC Welterweight Championship on July 27, 2024, at UFC 304. He won the fight and the title by unanimous decision.

Muhammad was scheduled to make his first UFC Welterweight Championship defense against undefeated contender Shavkat Rakhmonov on December 7, 2024, at UFC 310. However, due to a bone infection in his foot, Muhammad was forced to withdraw, delaying his first title defense.

Despite his absence from the card, Muhammad attended the event and attempted to enter the Octagon for a post-fight face-off with Rakhmonov. However, in an instance of mistaken identity, arena security—unaware of his status as the reigning champion—blocked his entry and treated him as an over-excited fan. The awkward delay lasted until commentator Joe Rogan took to the microphone to clarify, "He's the champion, let him in!" The incident became a subject of ridicule on social media, most notably from Conor McGregor, who mockingly questioned the champion's level of fame.

In February 2025, with Rakhmonov unable to compete due to an injury, Muhammad was scheduled to instead defend his title against Jack Della Maddalena on May 10, 2025, at UFC 315. He lost the fight and the title by unanimous decision. This fight earned him another Fight of the Night award.

==== Post-championship ====
Muhammad faced Ian Machado Garry on November 22, 2025, at UFC Fight Night 265. He lost the fight by unanimous decision.

Muhammad faced Gabriel Bonfim at the main event of UFC Fight Night 278 on June 6, 2026. He lost the fight by unanimous decision.

== Professional grappling career ==
Muhammad was scheduled to compete against Tarek Suleiman in the no gi co-main event of ADXC 1 on October 20, 2023. He withdrew from the match on short notice and was replaced by Marvin Vettori.

== Freestyle wrestling career ==
Muhammad competed at RAF 04 on December 20, 2025, losing to David Carr.

He defeated Ben Askren 6–3 in the co-main event of RAF 11 on July 18, 2026. This fight earned him a Match of the Night award.

Muhammad challenged for the RAF Crossover Cruiserweight Championship against champion Colby Covington in the main event on September 19, 2026, at RAF 13. He lost the match by technical fall in the second round.

== Personal life ==
Muhammad is a Muslim, and an outspoken supporter of Palestine. He has denounced the 2021 Israel–Palestine crisis, as well as the Gaza genocide. He often carries the Palestinian flag during weigh-ins.

On June 1, 2020, businesses owned by Muhammad's father and cousins in Chicago were looted and destroyed as a result of the George Floyd unrest.

He threw the ceremonial first pitch for the Chicago Cubs on July 28, 2021.

== Championships and accomplishments ==
=== Mixed Martial Arts ===
- Ultimate Fighting Championship
  - UFC Welterweight Championship (One time)
    - First UFC champion of Palestinian descent
  - Performance of the Night (Two times) vs. Takashi Sato and Sean Brady
  - Fight of the Night (Two times) vs. Alan Jouban and Jack Della Maddalena
  - Tied (Kamaru Usman) for most unanimous decision wins in UFC Welterweight division history (11)
    - Tied (Rafael dos Anjos, Brad Tavares & Kamaru Usman) for second most unanimous decision wins in UFC history (11)
    - Tied (Georges St-Pierre) for second most decision wins in UFC Welterweight division history (12)
    - Tied for third most decision wins in UFC history (12)
  - Second highest takedown defense percentage in UFC Welterweight division history (90.6%)
  - Second most significant strikes landed in UFC Welterweight division history (1515) (behind Neil Magny)
    - Fourth most total strikes landed in UFC Welterweight division history (2303)
    - Second most total fight time in UFC Welterweight division history (5:47:38) (behind Neil Magny)
  - UFC.com Awards
    - 2024: Ranked #10 Fighter of the Year
    - 2025: Ranked #4 Fight of the Year vs. Jack Della Maddalena
- Titan Fighting Championship
  - Titan FC Welterweight Championship (One time)
- MMA Junkie
  - 2019 January Fight of the Month vs. Geoff Neal
- Slacky Awards
  - 2024 Gameplan of the Year vs. Leon Edwards at UFC 304

=== Freestyle wrestling ===
- Real American Freestyle
  - Match of the Night (One time) vs. Ben Askren

== Mixed martial arts record ==
Professional record breakdown
31 matches	24 wins	6 losses
By knockout	5	1
By submission	1	0
By decision	18	5
No contests	1	

Res.	Record	Opponent	Method	Event	Date	Round	Time	Location	Notes
Loss	24–6 (1)	Gabriel Bonfim	Decision (unanimous)	UFC Fight Night: Muhammad vs. Bonfim	June 6, 2026	5	5:00	Las Vegas, Nevada, United States	
Loss	24–5 (1)	Ian Machado Garry	Decision (unanimous)	UFC Fight Night: Tsarukyan vs. Hooker	November 22, 2025	3	5:00	Al Rayyan, Qatar	
Loss	24–4 (1)	Jack Della Maddalena	Decision (unanimous)	UFC 315	May 10, 2025	5	5:00	Montreal, Quebec, Canada	Lost the UFC Welterweight Championship. Fight of the Night.
Win	24–3 (1)	Leon Edwards	Decision (unanimous)	UFC 304	July 27, 2024	5	5:00	Manchester, England	Won the UFC Welterweight Championship.
Win	23–3 (1)	Gilbert Burns	Decision (unanimous)	UFC 288	May 6, 2023	5	5:00	Newark, New Jersey, United States	
Win	22–3 (1)	Sean Brady	TKO (punches)	UFC 280	October 22, 2022	2	4:47	Abu Dhabi, United Arab Emirates	Performance of the Night.
Win	21–3 (1)	Vicente Luque	Decision (unanimous)	UFC on ESPN: Luque vs. Muhammad 2	April 16, 2022	5	5:00	Las Vegas, Nevada, United States	
Win	20–3 (1)	Stephen Thompson	Decision (unanimous)	UFC Fight Night: Lewis vs. Daukaus	December 18, 2021	3	5:00	Las Vegas, Nevada, United States	
Win	19–3 (1)	Demian Maia	Decision (unanimous)	UFC 263	June 12, 2021	3	5:00	Glendale, Arizona, United States	
NC	18–3 (1)	Leon Edwards	NC (accidental eye poke)	UFC Fight Night: Edwards vs. Muhammad	March 13, 2021	2	0:18	Las Vegas, Nevada, United States	Accidental eye poke rendered Muhammad unable to continue.
Win	18–3	Dhiego Lima	Decision (unanimous)	UFC 258	February 13, 2021	3	5:00	Las Vegas, Nevada, United States	
Win	17–3	Lyman Good	Decision (unanimous)	UFC on ESPN: Blaydes vs. Volkov	June 20, 2020	3	5:00	Las Vegas, Nevada, United States	
Win	16–3	Takashi Sato	Submission (rear-naked choke)	UFC 242	September 7, 2019	3	1:55	Abu Dhabi, United Arab Emirates	Performance of the Night.
Win	15–3	Curtis Millender	Decision (unanimous)	UFC 236	April 13, 2019	3	5:00	Atlanta, Georgia, United States	
Loss	14–3	Geoff Neal	Decision (unanimous)	UFC Fight Night: Cejudo vs. Dillashaw	January 19, 2019	3	5:00	Brooklyn, New York, United States	
Win	14–2	Chance Rencountre	Decision (unanimous)	UFC Fight Night: Rivera vs. Moraes	June 1, 2018	3	5:00	Utica, New York, United States	
Win	13–2	Tim Means	Decision (split)	UFC Fight Night: Werdum vs. Tybura	November 19, 2017	3	5:00	Sydney, Australia	
Win	12–2	Jordan Mein	Decision (unanimous)	UFC 213	July 8, 2017	3	5:00	Las Vegas, Nevada, United States	
Win	11–2	Randy Brown	Decision (unanimous)	UFC 208	February 11, 2017	3	5:00	Brooklyn, New York, United States	
Loss	10–2	Vicente Luque	KO (punches)	UFC 205	November 12, 2016	1	1:19	New York City, New York, United States	
Win	10–1	Augusto Montaño	TKO (punches)	UFC Fight Night: Poirier vs. Johnson	September 17, 2016	3	4:19	Hidalgo, Texas, United States	
Loss	9–1	Alan Jouban	Decision (unanimous)	UFC Fight Night: dos Anjos vs. Alvarez	July 7, 2016	3	5:00	Las Vegas, Nevada, United States	Fight of the Night.
Win	9–0	Steve Carl	TKO (punches)	Titan FC 38	April 30, 2016	4	4:07	Miami, Florida, United States	Won the inaugural Titan FC Welterweight Championship.
Win	8–0	Zane Kamaka	Decision (unanimous)	Titan FC 35	September 19, 2015	3	5:00	Ridgefield, Washington, United States	
Win	7–0	Keith Johnson	Decision (unanimous)	Titan FC 33	March 20, 2015	3	5:00	Mobile, Alabama, United States	Catchweight (174 lb) bout; Johnson missed weight.
Win	6–0	Chris Curtis	Decision (unanimous)	Hoosier Fight Club 21	September 13, 2014	3	5:00	Valparaiso, Indiana, United States	
Win	5–0	A.J. Matthews	Decision (unanimous)	Bellator 112	March 14, 2014	3	5:00	Hammond, Indiana, United States	
Win	4–0	Garrett Gross	Decision (unanimous)	Hoosier Fight Club 18	November 9, 2013	3	5:00	Valparaiso, Indiana, United States	
Win	3–0	Jimmy Fritz	TKO (punches)	Hoosier Fight Club 15	April 6, 2013	2	2:19	Valparaiso, Indiana, United States	
Win	2–0	Quinton McCottrell	Decision (unanimous)	Bellator 84	December 14, 2012	3	5:00	Hammond, Indiana, United States	
Win	1–0	Justin Brock	TKO (punches)	Hoosier Fight Club 12	August 18, 2012	1	2:17	Valparaiso, Indiana, United States	Welterweight debut.

== Pay-per-view bouts ==
No.	Event	Fight	Date	Venue	City	PPV buys
1.	UFC 304	Edwards vs. Muhammad 2	July 27, 2024	Co-op Live	Manchester, England, United Kingdom	Not Disclosed
2.	UFC 315	Muhammad vs. Della Maddalena	May 10, 2025	Bell Centre	Montreal, Quebec, Canada	Not Disclosed

== See also ==
- List of current UFC fighters
- List of male mixed martial artists

Awards and achievements
Preceded by Leon Edwards	14th UFC Welterweight Champion; July 27, 2024 – May 10, 2025	Succeeded by Jack Della Maddalena
