= Leon Edwards =

Jamaican-British mixed martial artist (born 1991)

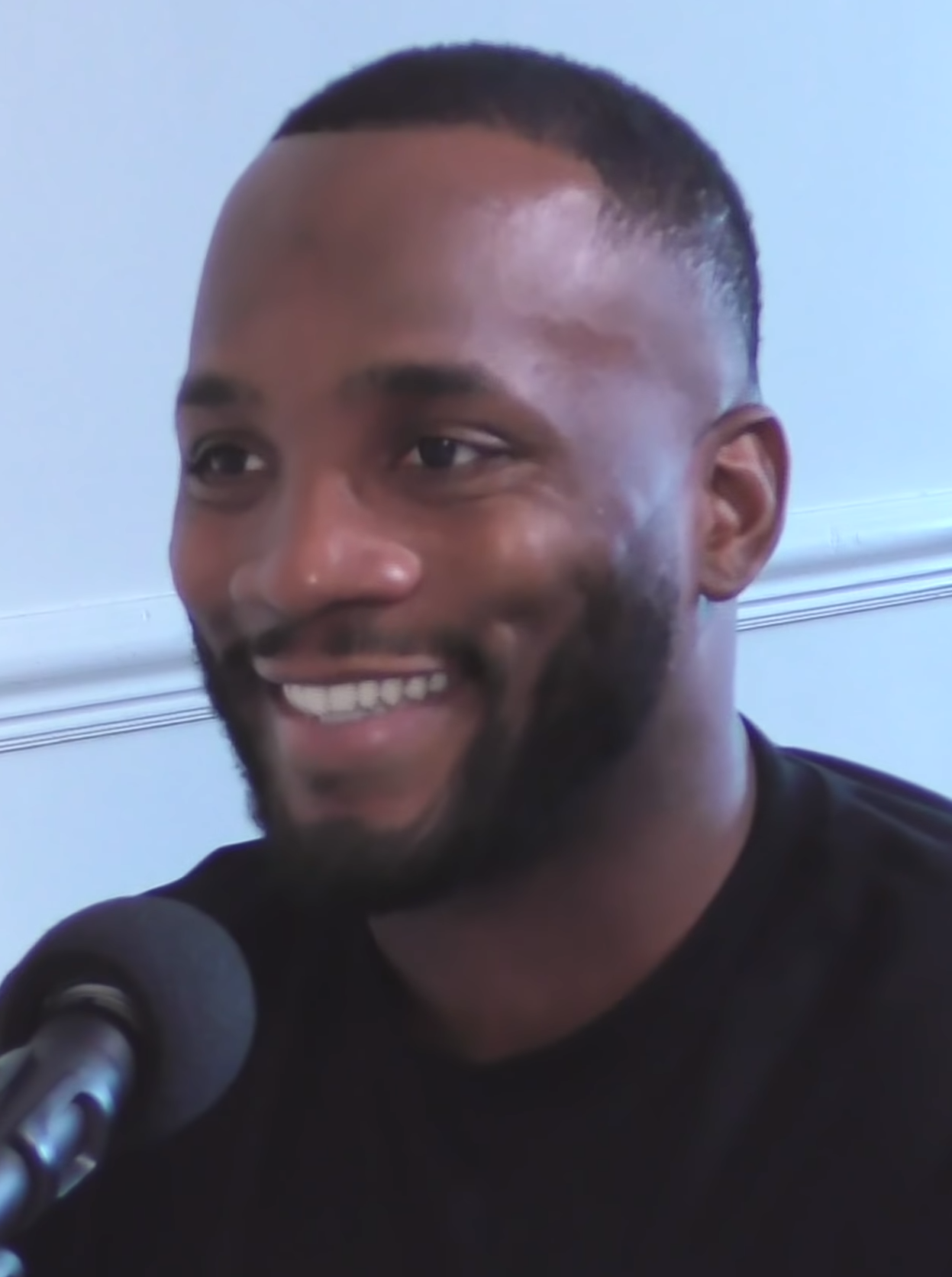
- Edwards in 2021
- Born: 25 August 1991 (age 35); Kingston, Surrey, Jamaica
- Other names: Rocky
- Height: 6 ft 2 in (188 cm)
- Weight: 170 lb (77 kg; 12 st 2 lb)
- Division: Middleweight (2011); Welterweight (2011, 2012–present)
- Reach: 74 in (188 cm)
- Stance: Southpaw
- Fighting out of: Erdington, Birmingham, England
- Team: Team Renegade
- Rank: Black belt in Brazilian Jiu-Jitsu under Thomas Bracher
- Years active: 2011–present

Mixed martial arts record
- Total: 29
- Wins: 22
- By knockout: 7
- By submission: 3
- By decision: 12
- Losses: 6
- By knockout: 1
- By submission: 1
- By decision: 3
- By disqualification: 1
- No contests: 1

Other information
- Notable relatives: Fabian Edwards (brother)
- Mixed martial arts record from Sherdog

Leon Edwards (born 25 August 1991) is a British professional mixed martial artist. He currently competes in the welterweight division of the Ultimate Fighting Championship (UFC), where he is a former UFC Welterweight Champion. A professional since 2011, Edwards formerly competed for BAMMA, where he was the BAMMA welterweight champion. As of 14 November 2026, he is #11 in the Meta UFC welterweight rankings.

== Early life ==
Edwards was born in Kingston, Jamaica, and lived with his parents and his brother in a one-room house. Growing up, he was surrounded by crime, and his father was involved in what he describes as "questionable activities". Edwards moved to the Aston area of Birmingham, England at nine years old. In the early hours of 2 October 2004, when Edwards was 13 years old, his father, Rufus Edwards, was shot and killed in a nightclub in Croydon, London. He was then involved in criminal activity such as drug dealing, street fighting, and knife possession along with others in his social circle, but was able to get out of his lifestyle at age 17, when his mother got him to join an MMA club.

== Mixed martial arts career ==
=== Early career ===
Edwards began his professional fighting career in 2010, making his debut as an amateur at Bushido Challenge 2 - A New Dawn. Edwards fought Carl Booth, winning via an armbar submission in round two.

=== Fight UK MMA ===
Edwards then signed a contract with Fight UK MMA. He debuted for the promotion against Damian Zlotnicki, winning via technical knockout in the first round. He had two more fights for the promotion, winning against Pawel Zwiefka and losing against Delroy McDowell via DQ by way of an illegal knee.

=== Post-Fight UK MMA ===
Edwards obtained a 2–1 record after leaving Fight UK MMA. He then fought Craig White at the Strength and Honor 14, winning by decision. Edwards then went to fight for "BAMMA", in which he went 5–0. During his stint with BAMMA, he won the welterweight championship against Wayne Murrie and he defended it once against Shaun Taylor in what was his last fight with BAMMA before going to the UFC.

=== Ultimate Fighting Championship ===
Edwards made his promotional debut against Cláudio Silva on 8 November 2014 at UFC Fight Night: Shogun vs. Saint Preux. He was defeated via split decision. 9 out of 11 media outlets scored the bout for Edwards.

Edwards faced veteran Seth Baczynski on 11 April 2015 at UFC Fight Night 64. Edwards won the fight via KO at 0:08 of the first round. This result earned him a Performance of the Night bonus and marked one of the sixth fastest knockouts in the organization.

Edwards faced Pawel Pawlak on 18 July 2015 at UFC Fight Night 72. He won the fight via unanimous decision.

Edwards next faced eventual UFC champion Kamaru Usman on 19 December 2015 at UFC on Fox 17. He lost the fight by unanimous decision.

Edwards faced Dominic Waters on 8 May 2016 at UFC Fight Night 87. He won the fight via unanimous decision.

Edwards next faced Albert Tumenov on 8 October 2016 at UFC 204. He won the fight via submission in the third round.

Edwards faced Vicente Luque on 18 March 2017 at UFC Fight Night 107. He won the fight by unanimous decision.

Edwards faced Bryan Barberena on 2 September 2017 at UFC Fight Night 115. He won the fight by unanimous decision.

Edwards faced Peter Sobotta on 17 March 2018 at UFC Fight Night 127. He won the fight via TKO at 4:59 in the third round.

Edwards faced Donald Cerrone on 23 June 2018 at UFC Fight Night 132. He won the fight via unanimous decision.

Edwards faced Gunnar Nelson on 16 March 2019 at UFC Fight Night 147. He won the bout by split decision. After the event, Edwards was punched backstage by Jorge Masvidal, which left Edwards with a laceration under his left eye.

Edwards faced former UFC lightweight champion Rafael dos Anjos on 20 July 2019 in the main event of UFC on ESPN 4. He won the fight via unanimous decision.

As the first bout of his new, multi-fight contract, Edwards was scheduled to face Tyron Woodley on 21 March 2020 at UFC Fight Night: Woodley vs. Edwards. However, the restrictions related to COVID-19 forced Edwards to withdraw as the event was meant to be moved from London to the United States, and the event was subsequently cancelled.

After a 425-day hiatus since his bout with Dos Anjos, the UFC had removed Edwards from the UFC rankings due to inactivity on 22 October 2020. However, one day later, it was announced that he had been scheduled to face undefeated prospect Khamzat Chimaev in the main event of UFC Fight Night 183 on 19 December 2020. This involved Edwards being back to the #3 spot in the UFC rankings. On 29 November, it was announced that Chimaev had allegedly tested positive for COVID-19, which meant the bout was declared on jeopardy. On 1 December, Edwards officially tested positive for COVID-19 and allegedly lost twelve pounds due to the severity of his case, so the bout was subsequently postponed. On 22 December, it was announced that the contest has been rescheduled for 20 January 2021, at UFC Fight Night 185. In turn, Chimaev pulled out of the contest on 29 December due to lingering effects of his own COVID-19 struggle. As a result, the bout was temporarily cancelled. On 13 January, the bout was scheduled for the third time, and was scheduled to headline UFC Fight Night 187 on 13 March 2021. However, on 11 February, UFC president Dana White announced the fight was once again cancelled due to Chimaev suffering from lingering effects of COVID-19. On 18 February, it was announced that Belal Muhammad would be the replacement opponent for Edwards. During the beginning of the second round, Edwards accidentally poked Muhammad in the eye rendering him unable to continue. The fight was declared a no contest, snapping his 8-fight win streak.

Edwards was expected to face Nate Diaz on 15 May 2021 at UFC 262, marking the first time a non-main event and non-title bout had been scheduled for 5 rounds in UFC history. However, the bout was moved to UFC 263 due to a minor injury sustained by Diaz. Edwards controlled a vast majority of the bout, but was stunned badly with punches late in the fifth. Edwards won the fight by unanimous decision (49–46, 49–46, 49–46).

Edwards was scheduled to face Jorge Masvidal on 11 December 2021 at UFC 269. However, Masvidal withdrew due to injury and the bout was scrapped.

==== UFC Welterweight Champion ====
Edwards rematched Kamaru Usman on 20 August 2022 at UFC 278 for the UFC Welterweight Championship. After having a successful first round and struggling for the next four, Edwards won the fight and title via knockout in the fifth round, claiming the UFC Welterweight Championship. The win earned him the Performance of the Night award. This victory is considered by many to be one of the best knockouts of all time, as well as one of the best comebacks to ever be pulled off in UFC history.

A third fight between Edwards and Usman took place on 18 March 2023, at UFC 286. With a point deduction in the third round due to grabbing the fence to prevent a takedown, he won the bout via majority decision. Aside from the fence grab, Edwards was commended for showing significant improvement from the second meeting with Usman, defending 11 of Usman's 15 takedown attempts and out-striking Usman on the feet for most of the fight.

In the second defence of his title, Edwards faced Colby Covington on 16 December 2023 in the main event at UFC 296. He won the fight via unanimous decision.

In his third attempted title defence, Edwards faced Belal Muhammad again in a rematch on 27 July 2024 in the main event at UFC 304. After being taken down throughout the bout, he lost the championship via unanimous decision, which was the first fight he lost in nine years.

==== Post championship ====
Edwards was scheduled to face Jack Della Maddalena in the main event on 22 March 2025 at UFC Fight Night 255 in London, England. However, Della Maddalena was pulled from the card to be rescheduled for another matchup, and was replaced by Sean Brady. In his first loss via finish, Edwards lost the fight via a guillotine choke submission in the fourth round.

Edwards faced Carlos Prates on 15 November 2025 at UFC 322. He suffered the first knockout loss of his career in the second round.

Edwards was scheduled to face Daniel Rodriguez on 11 July 2026 at UFC 329. However, Rodriguez was instead scheduled to face another opponent at another date.

== Personal life ==
Leon grew up in Aston, Birmingham, England but is originally from Kingston, Jamaica. He started training mixed martial arts when he was 17. His nickname, Rocky, was given to him by his friends in school. His brother, Fabian, is also a mixed martial artist.

== Championships and accomplishments ==
=== Mixed martial arts ===
- Ultimate Fighting Championship
  - UFC Welterweight Championship (One time)
    - Two successful title defenses
    - First Jamaican-born champion in UFC history
    - One of three undisputed British champions in UFC history (with Michael Bisping and Tom Aspinall)
  - Performance of the Night (Two Times) vs. Seth Baczynski and Kamaru Usman 2
  - Sixth-fastest finish in UFC history vs. Seth Baczynski (8 seconds)
  - Second longest unbeaten streak in UFC Welterweight Division history (13) (behind Kamaru Usman)
  - Tied (Kamaru Usman) for fourth most decision wins in UFC Welterweight division history (10)
  - Tied (Ian Machado Garry & Jack Della Maddalena) for the third longest win streak in UFC Welterweight division history (8)
  - Latest knockout & finish in UFC Welterweight division history (0:01 remaining vs. Peter Sobotta)
  - UFC Honors Awards
    - 2022: Fan's Choice Knockout of the Year Winner vs. Kamaru Usman 2 & Fan's Choice Comeback of the Year Winner vs. Kamaru Usman 2
  - UFC.com Awards
    - 2022: Ranked #5 Fighter of the Year, Upset of the Year & Knockout of the Year vs. Kamaru Usman 2
    - 2023: Ranked #3 Fighter of the Year & Ranked #6 Upset of the Year vs. Kamaru Usman 3
- BAMMA
  - BAMMA RDX Welterweight Championship (One time, former)
    - One successful title defence
- MMA Junkie
  - 2022 Knockout of the Year vs. Kamaru Usman 2 at UFC 278
  - 2022 August Knockout of the Month vs. Kamaru Usman 2 at UFC 278
- ESPN
  - 2022 Knockout of the Year vs. Kamaru Usman 2 at UFC 278
- Bleacher Report
  - 2022 UFC Knockout of the Year vs. Kamaru Usman 2 at UFC 278
  - 2022 Upset of the Year vs. Kamaru Usman 2 at UFC 278
- CBS Sports
  - 2022 UFC Knockout of the Year vs. Kamaru Usman 2 at UFC 278
- Cageside Press
  - 2022 Comeback of the Year vs. Kamaru Usman 2 at UFC 278
  - 2022 Knockout of the Year vs. Kamaru Usman 2 at UFC 278, tied with Michael Chandler
- Combat Press
  - 2022 Comeback of the Year vs. Kamaru Usman 2 at UFC 278
- Violent Money TV
  - VMTV UK MMA Knockout of the Year 2022 vs. Kamaru Usman 2 at UFC 278
  - VMTV UK MMA Male Fighter of the Year 2023
- World MMA Awards
  - 2023 Charles 'Mask' Lewis Fighter of the Year
  - 2023 International Fighter of the Year
  - 2023 Knockout of the Year vs. Kamaru Usman 2 at UFC 278
  - 2023 Comeback of the Year vs. Kamaru Usman 2 at UFC 278
- Sportsnaut
  - 2023 UFC Fighter of the Year
- LowKick MMA
  - 2022 Upset of the Year vs. Kamaru Usman 2 at UFC 278
- Slacky Awards
  - 2018 Gameplan of the Year vs. Donald Cerrone at UFC Fight Night: Cowboy vs. Edwards

== Mixed martial arts record ==
Professional record breakdown
29 matches	22 wins	6 losses
By knockout	7	1
By submission	3	1
By decision	12	3
By disqualification	0	1
No contests	1	

Res.	Record	Opponent	Method	Event	Date	Round	Time	Location	Notes
Loss	22–6 (1)	Carlos Prates	KO (punches)	UFC 322	15 November 2025	2	1:28	New York City, New York, United States	
Loss	22–5 (1)	Sean Brady	Submission (guillotine choke)	UFC Fight Night: Edwards vs. Brady	22 March 2025	4	1:39	London, England	
Loss	22–4 (1)	Belal Muhammad	Decision (unanimous)	UFC 304	27 July 2024	5	5:00	Manchester, England	Lost the UFC Welterweight Championship.
Win	22–3 (1)	Colby Covington	Decision (unanimous)	UFC 296	16 December 2023	5	5:00	Las Vegas, Nevada, United States	Defended the UFC Welterweight Championship.
Win	21–3 (1)	Kamaru Usman	Decision (majority)	UFC 286	18 March 2023	5	5:00	London, England	Defended the UFC Welterweight Championship. Edwards was deducted one point in round 3 due to grabbing the fence.
Win	20–3 (1)	Kamaru Usman	KO (head kick)	UFC 278	20 August 2022	5	4:04	Salt Lake City, Utah, United States	Won the UFC Welterweight Championship. Performance of the Night.
Win	19–3 (1)	Nate Diaz	Decision (unanimous)	UFC 263	12 June 2021	5	5:00	Glendale, Arizona, United States	
NC	18–3 (1)	Belal Muhammad	NC (accidental eye poke)	UFC Fight Night: Edwards vs. Muhammad	13 March 2021	2	0:18	Las Vegas, Nevada, United States	Accidental eye poke rendered Muhammad unable to continue.
Win	18–3	Rafael dos Anjos	Decision (unanimous)	UFC on ESPN: dos Anjos vs. Edwards	20 July 2019	5	5:00	San Antonio, Texas, United States	
Win	17–3	Gunnar Nelson	Decision (split)	UFC Fight Night: Till vs. Masvidal	16 March 2019	3	5:00	London, England	
Win	16–3	Donald Cerrone	Decision (unanimous)	UFC Fight Night: Cowboy vs. Edwards	23 June 2018	5	5:00	Kallang, Singapore	
Win	15–3	Peter Sobotta	TKO (punches)	UFC Fight Night: Werdum vs. Volkov	17 March 2018	3	4:59	London, England	
Win	14–3	Bryan Barberena	Decision (unanimous)	UFC Fight Night: Volkov vs. Struve	2 September 2017	3	5:00	Rotterdam, Netherlands	
Win	13–3	Vicente Luque	Decision (unanimous)	UFC Fight Night: Manuwa vs. Anderson	18 March 2017	3	5:00	London, England	
Win	12–3	Albert Tumenov	Submission (rear-naked choke)	UFC 204	8 October 2016	3	3:01	Manchester, England	
Win	11–3	Dominic Waters	Decision (unanimous)	UFC Fight Night: Overeem vs. Arlovski	8 May 2016	3	5:00	Rotterdam, Netherlands	
Loss	10–3	Kamaru Usman	Decision (unanimous)	UFC on Fox: dos Anjos vs. Cowboy 2	19 December 2015	3	5:00	Orlando, Florida, United States	
Win	10–2	Paweł Pawlak	Decision (unanimous)	UFC Fight Night: Bisping vs. Leites	18 July 2015	3	5:00	Glasgow, Scotland	
Win	9–2	Seth Baczynski	KO (punches)	UFC Fight Night: Gonzaga vs. Cro Cop 2	11 April 2015	1	0:08	Kraków, Poland	Performance of the Night.
Loss	8–2	Cláudio Silva	Decision (split)	UFC Fight Night: Shogun vs. Saint Preux	8 November 2014	3	5:00	Uberlândia, Brazil	
Win	8–1	Shaun Taylor	KO (punch)	BAMMA 16	13 September 2014	3	3:30	Manchester, England	Defended the BAMMA British Welterweight Championship.
Win	7–1	Wayne Murrie	Submission (rear-naked choke)	BAMMA 15	5 May 2014	3	3:13	London, England	Won the BAMMA British Welterweight Championship.
Win	6–1	Wendle Lewis	KO (punches)	BAMMA 14	14 December 2013	1	1:20	Birmingham, England	
Win	5–1	Adam Boussif	Submission (arm-triangle choke)	BAMMA 13	13 September 2013	1	2:10	Birmingham, England	
Win	4–1	Jonathan Bilton	TKO (knees)	BAMMA 11	1 December 2012	2	1:11	Birmingham, England	
Win	3–1	Craig White	Technical Decision	Strength and Honour 14	3 November 2012	2	5:00	Exeter, England	
Loss	2–1	Delroy McDowell	DQ (illegal knee)	Fight UK MMA 6	25 February 2012	3	2:40	Leicester, England	Return to Welterweight.
Win	2–0	Pawel Zwiefka	Decision (unanimous)	Fight UK MMA 5	19 November 2011	3	5:00	Leicester, England	Middleweight debut.
Win	1–0	Damian Zlotnicki	TKO (punches)	Fight UK MMA 4	5 June 2011	1	2:15	Leicester, England	Welterweight debut.

== Pay-per-view bouts ==
No.	Event	Fight	Date	Venue	City	PPV buys
1.	UFC 278	Usman vs. Edwards 2	20 August 2022	Vivint Arena	Salt Lake City, Utah, United States	Not Disclosed
2.	UFC 286	Edwards vs. Usman 3	18 March 2023	The O2 Arena	London, England, United Kingdom	Not Disclosed
3.	UFC 296	Edwards vs. Covington	16 December 2023	T-Mobile Arena	Las Vegas, Nevada, United States	Not Disclosed
4.	UFC 304	Edwards vs. Muhammad 2	27 July 2024	Co-op Live	Manchester, England, United Kingdom	Not Disclosed

== See also ==
- List of current UFC fighters
- List of male mixed martial artists

Achievements
Preceded by Kamaru Usman	13th UFC Welterweight Champion; 20 August 2022 – 27 July 2024	Succeeded by Belal Muhammad
Awards
Preceded by Alexander Volkanovski	World MMA Fighter of the Year; 2022–23	Succeeded by Alex Pereira
Preceded by Michael Chandler	World MMA Knockout of the Year; 2022–23 vs. Kamaru Usman at UFC 278	Succeeded by Max Holloway
Preceded by Aljamain Sterling	World MMA Comeback of the Year; 2022–23 vs. Kamaru Usman at UFC 278	Succeeded by Tom Aspinall
