= The Ultimate Fighter: American Top Team vs. Blackzilians =

US television program

- Genre: Reality, Sports
- Created by: Frank Fertitta III, Lorenzo Fertitta, Dana White
- Starring: Dana White, American Top Team, Blackzilians
- Country of origin: United States

Production
- Running time: 60 minutes

Original release
- Network: Fox Sports 1
- Release: April 22 – July 8, 2015

The Ultimate Fighter: American Top Team vs. Blackzilians (also known as The Ultimate Fighter 21) was the twenty-first installment of the Ultimate Fighting Championship (UFC)-produced reality television series The Ultimate Fighter. This season was the first to feature a gym vs. gym theme.

The series was officially announced by the UFC on February 28, 2015. For the first time ever, the UFC reality series featured a format pitting two of the sport's top gyms – American Top Team and the Blackzilians – against one another. The season was filmed in South Florida, where the two camps sit just miles apart, and the competitors were welterweights from each facility. An amount of $500,000 was earned throughout the season based on wins and losses for the winning gym.

Dan Lambert heads the ATT team, and rival Glenn Robinson heads the Blackzilians club. The series prominently features the rivalry between the two camps, which developed in 2011 after a band of ATT fighters defected and started their own camp with Robinson, who is the gym's owner but not their head coach. The two gyms are located just 20 minutes apart. The teams were made up of eight up-and-coming welterweights from each gym. The 16 men shared a house in the Miami/Fort Lauderdale area but instead of training amongst each other, the athletes still worked with their coaches at their respective gyms. The actual fights took place at American Top Team in Coconut Creek and the Blackzilians' Jaco Hybrid Training Center in Boca Raton. The winning fighter earned home gym control for his team for the next bout. Opponents were not revealed until weigh-ins for the first time.

== Cast ==
=== Teams ===
American Top Team

- Dan Lambert, Gym Owner
- Ricardo Liborio
- Marcus "Conan" Silveira
- Mike Brown
- Din Thomas
- Brian Harris
- Steve Bruno
- Robbie Lawler

Blackzilians

- Glenn Robinson, Gym Owner
- Jorge Santiago
- Greg Jones
- Rashad Evans
- Tyrone Spong
- André Benkei
- Corey Peacock
- Douglas Kalman
- Jason Gochez
- Michael Johnson

=== Fighters ===
- American Top Team
  - Marcelo Alfaya, Steve Carl, Nathan Coy, Michael Graves, Hayder Hassan, Sabah Homasi, Uros Jurisic, Steve Montgomery.

*Montgomery was removed from the competition on episode 4 due to medical reasons. He was replaced by Cristiano Souza on episode 7.

- Blackzilians
  - Valdir Araújo, Carrington Banks, Luiz Firmino, Jason Jackson, Vicente Luque, Andrews Nakahara, Felipe Portela, Kamaru Usman.

*Nakahara was forced out of the competition on episode 7 due to a medical suspension. He was replaced by Alexandre Pimentel.

== Episodes ==
Episode 1: Rumble in South Florida (April 22, 2015)

- For the first time ever The Ultimate Fighter will be contested outside of Las Vegas, this time at South Florida. Both gyms, American Top Team and Blackzilians, are introduced, as well as their owners. They both share their stories about the inception of their gyms, including Blackzilians formation, as some of ATT fighters back then defected to the soon-to-be formed gym.
- Dana White comments on the fact that each owner will choose one fighter but their opponents will not be revealed until the weigh ins. There will be 12 fights in the first round and a fighter can fight up to three times or not at all. He also explains the format of the team competition this season: the first 4 fights will be worth 25 points each, the next 4 fights 50 points each and the final 4 fights will be worth 100 points each. The team with the most points at the end of the 12 fights will earn $200,000. After that, they move to the finale. For a fighter to be eligible, he must have fought two times during the regular season (12 fights). The winning fighter gets $300,000 for their gym.
- Each gym presents their fighter picks for the tournament.
- The teams arrive at the mansion in boats and are later greeted by White. He flips a coin (blue for ATT, black for the Blackzilians) of each team to determine the gym that will host the first fight, reminding them that the winner of each fight gets the home gym advantage for the next one. The Blackzilians win the coin toss.
- Dan Lambert explains to ATT's fighters all the aspects of the season.
- Glenn Robinson hosts the Blackzilians at his house as they watch their teammate, Anthony "Rumble" Johnson, defeat Alexander Gustafsson at the main event of UFC on Fox: Gustafsson vs. Johnson.
- ATT picks Michael Graves for their first fight. The Blackzilians picks Kamarudeen Usman. Later, both fighters make weight successfully.
- Kamarudeen Usman defeated Michael Graves via majority decision (20–18, 20–18, 19–19) after two rounds.
- After the fight, Hayder Hassan challenged Usman to a fight.

Episode 2: Battle Lines Drawn (April 29, 2015)

- Michael Graves expresses his sour feeling due to his loss on the last and also his opinion that he gave an opportunity for the Blackzilians to gain confidence. His teammates talk about the fact that they have all faced losses before and Graves never has. Due to that, Steve Carl believes his teammate will now have less pressure on his shoulders. Graves is supported by Nathan Coy and Hayder Hassan, who both say that they are all motivated to defeat their opponents.
- Hassan tries to work mind games on Kamarudeen Usman, but he does not want to take part in it. Later, both fighters comment on the situation with their teammates.
- After analyzing several options, ATT picks Uros Jurisic. The Blackzilians also consider many options, ultimately picking Luiz "Buscapé" Firmino.
- During a training session at the Fighter's House gym, Usman gets frustrated and angry at Jason Jackson. He leaves the session showing off his anger, but later calms down and apologizes to Jackson.
- Both fighters make weight and after that, Dan Lambert and Glenn Robinson exchange heated words during a confrontation.
- Luiz Firmino defeated Uros Jurisic via unanimous decision (20–18, 20–18, 20–18) after two rounds.

Episode 3: Settling the Score (May 6, 2015)

- Valdir "BBMonstro" Araújo complains about a stolen bottle of red wine. He believes that somebody from ATT stole it, but all of them deny it. In turn, Michael Graves confirms to Nathan Coy in a poker match that he drank the wine earlier. Steve Carl comments that his teammate has been doing deliberate things ever since he lost the first fight.
- After analyzing their options, ATT believes its time to change the game using their veterans and they pick Carl, a former WSOF Welterweight champion.
- The Blackzilians analyze their training and recovery to decide their next pick. After considering those aspects and his experience, they pick Araújo, who has formerly fought UFC middleweight champion Chris Weidman.
- Sabah Homasi talks to Steve Montgomery about Araújo's accusations days earlier and Graves' unadmitted guilt over drinking the wine. They both believe that Graves is being weak at the moment and that he needs to pull himself up.
- During weigh-ins, Carl weighs in at 171.75 lb on his first attempt and must make 171 within one hour. He goes to the Blackzilians' locker room to use their sauna and Michael Johnson does not like the fact that they are helping their rival. Tyrone Spong did not know that and does not like it as well. He discusses the issue with the athletic commission representative and later enters the locker room to confront ATT.
- Spong and Johnson demand that Carl and ATT leave the locker room. Dan Lambert and Coy argue with them about letting Carl stay as they would do the same if it was the opposite case. Spong says there are no rules about that and Coy mentions that "no rules" means that they will stay until their teammate cuts the remaining weight, which leads to a heated confrontation between the two of them. In the end, Carl weighs in at 170 lb.
- Valdir Araújo defeated Steve Carl via submission (guillotine choke) in the second round.

Episode 4: Boiling Point (May 13, 2015)

- Steve Carl says that he felt disconnected in the fight, something that "never happened before." Dan Lambert notes that Carl was the last guy he expected to hear that from.
- Conan Silveira tries to instigate motivation in the fighters and Steve Montgomery links his motivation and fighting spirit to that, citing that he is unafraid of losing, and that it all adds up to his own "fire." The coaches believe that is the right attitude for the team. Later, Montgomery is picked to fight next.
- Glenn Robinson and the rest of Blackzilians' coaching staff visit their fighters at the house. They speculate on Nathan Coy being their possible foe and Jorge Santiago believes that Carrington Banks would be a good choice to face him, something that Robinson is unsure about. Despite that, they all reach consensus on picking Banks for the fight, even though he has less experience than most fighters and has not fought in a while.
- The calmness in the house is suddenly broken by a scream asking for help on the second floor. It turns out that Montgomery is having a seizure, which scares all of his teammates while they try to help him. Emergency is called and they transfer him to a hospital for better evaluation.
- Lambert and Silveira try to figure out what to do in case Montgomery is not able to fight. They believe their opponent is either Banks or Jason Jackson. They speculate on whether picking Nathan Coy or Sabah Homasi, ultimately picking the latter.
- Homasi comments that besides fighting, he is also an "entertainer for women."
- Montgomery comes back from the hospital accompanied by Lambert. He comments that his seizure was caused by drinking too much water without ingesting any electrolytes with it. Despite having no sequelae, he is forced to leave the competition. He notes that he is more disappointed on what he has done to his team than what he did to himself. White then promises him a shot in the UFC if he stays healthy.
- Carrington Banks defeated Sabah Homasi via decision after three rounds.
- Homasi and his coaches are all shocked at the result. Lambert notes that while he was disappointed with some of the previous performances, that was not the case of Homasi.

Episode 5: Battle Wounds (May 20, 2015)

- Hayder Hassan defeated Andrews Nakahara via TKO (punches) in the first round at 48 seconds.
- This earns ATT their first win and 50 points, as they have now gained home gym advantage.

Episode 6: Fight Through the Pain (May 27, 2015)

- Jason Jackson defeated Marcelo Alfaya via majority decision (19–19, 20–18, 20–18) after two rounds.
- Dan Lambert and the ATT coaching staff express frustration with Alfaya, especially due to his major experience. Lambert says that after the fight, Alfaya told him he was saving energy in the first round. That statement made Lambert wish it was said before the fight, as they would have kept him from fighting next.
- Dana White reveals another change to the season. On the next episode, both ATT and the Blackzilians will have the opportunity to drop two fighters from the team and substitute two alternates.

Episode 7: Eyes on the Prize (June 3, 2015)

- The ATT coaches are still disappointed at their fighters. Conan Silveira urges them to seize the opportunity and perform better. He believes that they are wasting a great chance with poor performances. He also tells them to listen more to the coaches.
- Vicente Luque defeated Nathan Coy via submission (anaconda choke) at 2:26 in the third round.
- Coy was tearful and dejected about the loss, as the Blackzilians now lead 200 to 50 points and retain home gym advantage.

Episode 8: Lightning Strikes Twice (June 10, 2015)

- Hayder Hassan defeated Felipe Portela via majority decision (20–18, 19–19, 20–18) after two rounds.
- With the win, Hassan earns ATT a significant 50 points in the competition and takes home gym advantage for the next fight. The Blackzilians still lead 200 points to 100, but with the next four fights rewarding 100 points each, there is potential for ATT to make a comeback and possibly even win.

Episode 9: No Guts, No Glory (June 17, 2015)

- Kamarudeen Usman defeated Steve Carl via unanimous decision (20–18, 20–18, 20–18) after two rounds.
- Carl says that both of his fight during the tournament were the worst of his career and that he does not know whether it is the atmosphere of the reality show or the pressure of letting his team down that made him perform poorly.
- In order to win the $200,000 team prize, ATT must win three straight fights to end the season.

Episode 10: Do or Die (June 24, 2015)

- Nathan Coy defeated Valdir Araújo via unanimous decision (20–18, 20–18, 20–18) after two rounds.
- Blackzilians still lead 300 to 200 in points with two 100-point fights remaining. However, home gym advantage goes back to ATT for the next fight.

Episode 11: Pushing the Limits (July 1, 2015)

- The celebration in ATT's locker room is huge as there is still a chance of winning the competition. Ricardo Liborio comments that with big adversities, come big opportunities and that's their motto to finish the season strong.
- Meanwhile, in the Blackzilians' locker room, Glenn Robinson says he is proud of Araújo, but he rants on the fact that his team has no right to celebrate until it's all over and they win the show. Some of the fighters, like Usman and Jackson, believe that some of their teammates have lost the hunger. They felt some of those fighters took the tournament for granted and that's what led to the heated discussion.
- The Blackzilians have no problem selecting Jason Jackson as their fighter for the next bout. Jackson was the first fighter from their team to win a fight in ATT's gym, when he defeated Marcelo Alfaya on episode 6. He feels confident and ready to repeat the performance.
- On the opposite site, American Top Team has a bit of an analyzing before picking their fighter. Right after the bat, Cristiano "Soldado" Souza is suggested by one of the coaches, while others contemplate bringing Michael Graves in. Graves is highly touted by the coaches, but after losing the first fight of the tournament, he went downhill as he started drinking and losing focus on training and the competition. Despite that, four of the five coaches in the room opt to choose Graves.
- Both teams visit the Joseph C. Carter Park in Fort Lauderdale to support the "Owner's Challenge". It will be a relay race and the winner will get $10,000 for him and $1,500 for each of his team's fighters. ATT will feature coach Brian Harris, Sabah Homasi, Cristiano Souza and Dan Lambert, while Blackzilians will feature Carrington Banks, coach Greg Jones, Jason Jackson and Glenn Robison. After a very close race, Lambert gets the win for ATT.
- In the kitchen, Usman confronts Homasi over comments about him holding the cage in previous fight, which leads to a heated argument.
- Before the fight, Graves appears to have injured his neck but he is still going to fight.
- Michael Graves defeated Jason Jackson via submission (rear-naked choke) at 3:01 in the first round.
- After the fight, an infuriated Robinson complains that Graves wasn't defending himself after Jackson landed a kick (apparently to the groin) and the fight should have been stopped. He only calms down after Liborio talks to him and reminds him that it's not worth to let the situation escalate to a brawl between the teams. Outside of the gym, Robinson confronts the referee and the commissioner with the same complaints.
- The performance replay confirms that while Jackson's foot hit Graves' body, his shin indeed hit Grave's groin. Dana White notes that if anyone should complain about the referee, it is the American Top Team, not Robinson.
- The result brings the competition even as both teams have 300 points. ATT retains home gym advantage for the final bout of the season.

Episode 12: Showdown (July 8, 2015)

- Glenn Robinson reminds the Blackzilians that they were proving themselves as the better team until they became overconfident and started losing. He asks the fighters if they want to be reminded as a team that started strong and finished weak. Right off the bat, Robinson announces Vicente Luque as their final pick of the season.
- Meanwhile, ATT discusses their next pick at the house. Dan Lambert asks Hayder Hassan who would he pick if he was the coach. Hassan wastes no time replying "me" and everyone agrees that he should be the one to finish it off for them. Lambert states that it is because of Hassan that they are still on the competition. Hassan will be the only fighter to fight three times this season.
- Hayder Hassan defeated Vicente Luque via split decision (29–28, 28–29, 29–28) after three rounds.
- Madness takes over the American Top Team as they celebrate their enormous comeback to win the competition 400 to 300 points and also get $200,000.
- As celebration takes place in ATT's locker room, desolation is in the air at the Blackzilians. They praise Luque's effort as well as the whole team.
- Both teams will close the season with their picks for the live finale on July 12 at the MGM Grand Garden Arena in Las Vegas, worth a Harley Davidson motorcycle, $300,000 and the TUF trophy. ATT can choose between Michael Graves, Nathan Coy and Hassan. While they believe Graves would be a tough match up against anyone from their opponents, they all agree that Hassan is their man, as he brought half of ATT's points. Blackzilians also has doubts as some coaches want to pick Luque again, while Rashad Evans voices his opinion that Kamarudeen Usman should be their guy due to his performances and two victories.
- Both teams gather at ATT's gym, while Dana White participates via video conference. Before the selections, Lambert announces that the whole team decided to donate the $200,000 prize to the Wounded Warrior Project, a charity and veterans service organization that offers a variety of programs, service and events for wounded veterans of the military actions following the events of September 11, 2001.
- ATT and Blackzilians announce their fighters for the finale: Hayder Hassan vs. Kamarudeen Usman.

== Tournament ==
=== Results table ===
Home Gym	Away Gym	Method	Round	Points
Kamaru Usman	Michael Graves	MD	2	25
Luiz Firmino	Uros Jurisic	UD	2	25
Valdir Araújo	Steve Carl	SUB	2	25
Carrington Banks	Sabah Homasi	UD	3	25
Andrews Nakahara	Hayder Hassan	TKO	1	50
Marcelo Alfaya	Jason Jackson	MD	2	50
Vicente Luque	Nathan Coy	SUB	3	50
Felipe Portela	Hayder Hassan	MD	2	50
Steve Carl	Kamaru Usman	UD	2	100
Valdir Araújo	Nathan Coy	UD	2	100
Michael Graves	Jason Jackson	SUB	1	100
Hayder Hassan	Vicente Luque	SD	3	100

Legend
	American Top Team
	Blackzilians
UD	Unanimous Decision
MD	Majority Decision
SD	Split Decision
SUB	Submission
(T) KO	(Technical) Knockout

=== Overall table ===
Teams	Total points	Wins
American Top Team	400	5
Blackzilians	300	7

== The Ultimate Fighter 21 Finale ==
The Ultimate Fighter: American Top Team vs. Blackzilians Finale
- The poster for The Ultimate Fighter: American Top Team vs. Blackzilians Finale
- Promotion: Ultimate Fighting Championship
- Date: July 12, 2015
- Venue: MGM Grand Garden Arena
- City: Las Vegas, Nevada
- Attendance: 4,844
- Total gate: $291,000

Event chronology
UFC 189: Mendes vs. McGregor	The Ultimate Fighter: American Top Team vs. Blackzilians Finale	UFC Fight Night: Mir vs. Duffee

The Ultimate Fighter: American Top Team vs. Blackzilians Finale (also known as The Ultimate Fighter 21 Finale) was a mixed martial arts event held on July 12, 2015, at the MGM Grand Garden Arena in Las Vegas, Nevada.

=== Background ===
The event was originally expected to be held in South Florida. However, on May 15, the event was moved to the MGM Grand Garden Arena in Las Vegas, Nevada.

A lightweight bout between former WEC & UFC Lightweight champion Benson Henderson and Michael Johnson was initially linked as the event headliner. However, on May 15, a welterweight bout between Jake Ellenberger and Stephen Thompson, originally booked for a day earlier at UFC 189, was announced as the main event. Although never officially announced by the UFC, the bout between Henderson and Johnson did not take place at this event.

The final of The Ultimate Fighter: American Top Team vs. Blackzilians took place at the event.

Márcio Alexandre Jr. was scheduled to face George Sullivan at the event. However, Alexandre pulled out of the fight during the week leading up to the event citing a rib injury and was replaced by promotional newcomer Dominic Waters.

Maximo Blanco missed weight on his first attempt at the weigh-ins, coming in at 148.5 lb. After having made no attempts to cut further, he was fined 20 percent of his fight purse, which went to Mike De La Torre.

During the live broadcast, it was announced that the next season of The Ultimate Fighter would be coached by current interim UFC Featherweight Champion Conor McGregor, who will lead a team of 8 European lightweights and former WEC Featherweight Champion Urijah Faber will coach a team of 8 American lightweights. They did not fight each other at the end of the season.

=== Results ===
Main Card (Fox Sports 1)
Weight class				Method	Round	Time	Notes
Welterweight	Stephen Thompson	def.	Jake Ellenberger	KO (spinning hook kick)	1	4:29
Welterweight	Kamaru Usman	def.	Hayder Hassan	Submission (arm-triangle choke)	2	1:19	(Note: The Ultimate Fighter: American Top Team vs. Blackzilians Final.)
Welterweight	Michael Graves	def.	Vicente Luque	Decision (unanimous) (29–28, 29–28, 29–28)	3	5:00
Welterweight	Jorge Masvidal	def.	Cezar Ferreira	KO (elbow and punches)	1	4:22
Women's Strawweight	Michelle Waterson	def.	Angela Magaña	Submission (rear-naked choke)	3	2:38
Catchweight (148.5 lb)	Maximo Blanco	def.	Mike De La Torre	TKO (punches)	1	0:16
Preliminary Card (Fox Sports 1)
Middleweight	Josh Samman	def.	Caio Magalhães	Submission (rear-naked choke)	1	2:52
Bantamweight	Jerrod Sanders	def.	Russell Doane	Decision (unanimous) (29–28, 30–27, 29–28)	3	5:00
Middleweight	Trevor Smith	def.	Dan Miller	Decision (unanimous) (30–25, 30–25, 30–26)	3	5:00
Welterweight	George Sullivan	def.	Dominic Waters	Decision (unanimous) (29–27, 30–25, 29–28)	3	5:00
Preliminary Card (UFC Fight Pass)
Flyweight	Willie Gates	def.	Darrell Montague	TKO (knees to the body and elbows)	1	1:36

== Bonus awards ==
The following fighters were awarded $50,000 bonuses:

- Fight of the Night: None awarded
- Performance of the Night: Stephen Thompson, Jorge Masvidal, Josh Samman and Kamaru Usman

== Reported payout ==
The following is the reported payout to the fighters as reported to the Nevada State Athletic Commission. It does not include sponsor money and also does not include the UFC's traditional "fight night" bonuses.

- Stephen Thompson: $42,000 (includes $21,000 win bonus) def. Jake Ellenberger: $73,000
- Kamaru Usman: $20,000 (includes $10,000 win bonus) def. Hayder Hassan: $10,000
- Michael Graves: $20,000 (includes $10,000 win bonus) def. Vicente Luque: $10,000
- Jorge Masvidal: $102,000 (includes $51,000 win bonus) def. Cezar Ferreira: $20,000
- Michelle Waterson: $30,000 (includes $15,000 win bonus) def. Angela Magaña: $10,000
- Maximo Blanco: $41,400 (includes $23,000 win bonus) def. Mike De La Torre: $17,600 ^
- Josh Samman: $20,000 (includes $10,000 win bonus) def. Caio Magalhães: $20,000
- Jerrod Sanders: $20,000 (includes $10,000 win bonus) def. Russell Doane: $11,000
- Trevor Smith: $34,000 (includes $17,000 win bonus) def. Dan Miller: $25,000
- George Sullivan: $30,000 (includes $15,000 win bonus) def. Dominic Waters: $10,000
- Willie Gates: $20,000 (includes $10,000 win bonus) def. Darrell Montague: $10,000

^ Maximo Blanco was fined 20 percent of his purse ($5,600) for failing to make the required weight for his fight with Mike De La Torre. That money was issued to De La Torre, an NSAC official confirmed.

== See also ==
- The Ultimate Fighter
- List of current UFC fighters
- List of UFC events
- 2015 in UFC
