= Rafael dos Anjos =

Brazilian mixed martial artist (born 1984)

- Born: Rafael Souza dos Anjos; 26 October 1984 (age 41); Niterói, Rio de Janeiro, Brazil
- Nationality: Brazilian; American
- Height: 5 ft 9 in (1.75 m)
- Weight: 170 lb (77 kg; 12 st 2 lb)
- Division: Lightweight (2004–2016, 2020, 2026–present); Welterweight (2017–2020, 2022–2024)
- Reach: 70 in (178 cm)
- Style: Brazilian Jiu-Jitsu
- Stance: Southpaw
- Fighting out of: Huntington Beach, California, U.S.
- Team: Evolve MMA (2009–present); RDA Academy; RVCA Training Center; Kings MMA (2012–2016); Nova União (2020–present)
- Rank: 5th degree black belt in Brazilian Jiu-Jitsu under Aldo "Caveirinha" Januário and Philipe "Furão" della Monica; Black prajied in Muay Thai under Rafael Cordeiro
- Years active: 2004–2026

Mixed martial arts record
- Total: 50
- Wins: 32
- By knockout: 5
- By submission: 11
- By decision: 16
- Losses: 18
- By knockout: 6
- By decision: 12

Other information
- Mixed martial arts record from Sherdog

Rafael Souza dos Anjos (Brazilian Portuguese: [ʁafaˈɛw duz ˈɐ̃ʒus]; born 26 October 1984), also known by his initials RDA, is a Brazilian and American professional mixed martial artist. He currently competes in the Welterweight and Lightweight divisions of the Ultimate Fighting Championship (UFC). A professional since 2004, he is a former UFC Lightweight Champion.

== Early life ==
In a 2014 interview, dos Anjos stated that he was a troubled child, getting into fights in his hometown Niterói, Rio de Janeiro. He originally started training Brazilian jiu-jitsu under Daniel Matheus at the age of nine. According to dos Anjos, he stopped fighting on the streets when he began training jiu jitsu.

== Mixed martial arts career ==
The majority of dos Anjos' early career took place in his native country of Brazil. He started off his career with a record of 2–2, with both losses coming by way of split decision. dos Anjos then racked up 9 straight victories, which included 6 submissions. His 11–2 record in regional circuits was enough to get him a call from the UFC.

=== Ultimate Fighting Championship ===
dos Anjos made his UFC debut at UFC 91, losing to Jeremy Stephens. The fight was stopped in the third round after an uppercut knocked out dos Anjos.

For his second UFC fight, dos Anjos faced Tyson Griffin at UFC Fight Night 18. dos Anjos lost the back-and-forth battle via unanimous decision. The bout was awarded Fight of the Night honors.

dos Anjos was scheduled to fight Matt Wiman on 19 September 2009, at UFC 103, but due to a knee injury suffered by Wiman, he instead faced Rob Emerson. dos Anjos got a much-needed win by unanimous decision.

dos Anjos then defeated Kyle Bradley via unanimous decision at UFC Fight Night 20.

At UFC 112, dos Anjos defeated Terry Etim via second round armbar submission, earning him Submission of the Night honors.

dos Anjos faced Clay Guida on 7 August 2010, at UFC 117. Guida appeared to injure the jaw of dos Anjos in the first round with a hook and would go on to defeat dos Anjos by submission (jaw injury) after dos Anjos tapped from the pressure being applied to his jaw while Guida had arm-and-head control.

dos Anjos next faced George Sotiropoulos on 2 July 2011 at UFC 132 after replacing an injured Evan Dunham. Dos Anjos showcased his vastly improved striking skills, knocking out Sotiropoulos cold in the first round with a right hand.

dos Anjos faced Gleison Tibau on 19 November 2011 at UFC 139. He lost the fight via split decision.

dos Anjos faced Kamal Shalorus on 15 May 2012 at UFC on Fuel TV 3. After dropping Shalorus with a head kick, dos Anjos submitted him via rear-naked choke in the first round.

After taking virtually no damage in the fight against Shalorus, dos Anjos quickly returned to face Anthony Njokuani on 11 July 2012 at UFC on Fuel TV 4, replacing an injured Paul Taylor. He won the fight via unanimous decision, dominating Njokuani both in striking and grappling.

dos Anjos faced Mark Bocek on 17 November 2012 at UFC 154. He won the fight via unanimous decision, once again having the edge in both standup and ground fighting.

dos Anjos next faced Evan Dunham on 18 May 2013, at UFC on FX 8. He won the fight via unanimous decision. However, there was some controversy, as 10 out of 10 media outlets scored the bout in favor of Dunham.

dos Anjos faced Donald Cerrone on 28 August 2013, at UFC Fight Night 27. He won the fight via unanimous decision.

dos Anjos was expected to face Rustam Khabilov on 22 February 2014 at UFC 170. However, the bout was scrapped in the weeks leading up to the event. dos Anjos instead faced Khabib Nurmagomedov on 19 April 2014 at UFC on Fox 11. He lost the fight via unanimous decision.

dos Anjos faced Jason High on 7 June 2014 at UFC Fight Night 42. He won the fight via TKO in the second round.

dos Anjos headlined UFC Fight Night 49 against former lightweight champion Benson Henderson on 23 August 2014. He won the fight via knockout in the first round after dropping Henderson with a flying knee and rendering him unconscious with a follow-up left hook. The win also earned him his first Performance of the Night bonus award and made him the only man to stop Henderson by strikes.

dos Anjos faced Nate Diaz on 13 December 2014, at UFC on Fox 13. He won the fight by unanimous decision. He dominated the first two rounds with superior striking and vicious leg kicks with the third round being controlled by dos Anjos on the mat.

==== UFC Lightweight Championship ====
dos Anjos faced Anthony Pettis for the UFC Lightweight Championship on 14 March 2015 at UFC 185. dos Anjos won the bout via unanimous decision in a dominant fashion. After the fight, dos Anjos revealed that he had torn his MCL only a few weeks before the bout. The win once again earned him a Performance of the Night bonus award.

For his first title defense, dos Anjos rematched Donald Cerrone in the main event of UFC on Fox 17 on 19 December 2015. He won the fight via TKO at just 66 seconds into the first round, resulting in the fastest finish in UFC Lightweight title history. The win also earned dos Anjos his third Performance of the Night bonus award.

dos Anjos was expected to face Conor McGregor on 5 March 2016 at UFC 196 for his second title defense of the lightweight belt. However, it was announced on 23 February that dos Anjos had been forced out of the fight after breaking his foot during training.

In his second title defense, dos Anjos faced Eddie Alvarez on 7 July 2016 at UFC Fight Night 90. Despite closing as a three-to-one favorite to win the fight, he lost the bout via TKO in the first round. Reports arose after the Alvarez fight that dos Anjos had passed out for three minutes moments before going out to fight, and that this was due to the effects of the gruelling weight cut.

==== Post championship ====
dos Anjos next faced Tony Ferguson on 5 November 2016 at The Ultimate Fighter Latin America 3 Finale. He lost the fight via unanimous decision. Both participants were awarded Fight of the Night for their performance.

==== Move to Welterweight ====
dos Anjos faced Tarec Saffiedine, former Strikeforce title holder, in a welterweight bout on 17 June 2017 at UFC Fight Night 111. He won the fight via unanimous decision (30–27, 30–27, and 29–28).

dos Anjos faced Neil Magny on 9 September 2017 at UFC 215. He won the fight via arm-triangle choke submission in the first round. This win also earned dos Anjos his fourth Performance of the Night bonus award.

In a title eliminator, dos Anjos faced Robbie Lawler on 16 December 2017 in the main event at UFC on Fox 26. dos Anjos' fight plan relied heavily on low leg kicks and constant combos consisting of body shots and leg kicks. He won the fight by unanimous decision.

dos Anjos fought Colby Covington on 9 June 2018, at UFC 225 for the Interim UFC Welterweight Championship. He lost the fight by unanimous decision.

dos Anjos faced Kamaru Usman on 30 November 2018 at The Ultimate Fighter 28 Finale. He lost the fight via unanimous decision.

dos Anjos faced Kevin Lee in Lee's welterweight debut at UFC Fight Night 152 on 18 May 2019. He won the fight via an arm triangle submission in the fourth round.

dos Anjos faced Leon Edwards on 20 July 2019 at UFC on ESPN 4. He lost the fight via unanimous decision.

dos Anjos faced Michael Chiesa on 25 January 2020, at UFC Fight Night 166. He lost the fight via unanimous decision.

==== Return to Lightweight ====
dos Anjos was expected to face Islam Makhachev on 24 October 2020, in dos Anjos' return to the lightweight division at UFC 254. However, on 8 October it was reported that dos Anjos tested positive for COVID-19 and he was removed from the bout. The pairing was left intact and rescheduled for 14 November 2020 at UFC Fight Night: Felder vs. dos Anjos. However, on 8 November it was reported that Makhachev was forced to pull from the event due to injuries. On a quick turnaround, it was announced that Paul Felder stepped up to replace Makhachev on five days notice. Simultaneously, dos Anjos signed a new six-fight contract with the UFC and committed to compete in the lightweight division. dos Anjos went on to defeat Felder via split decision. This fight earned him the Fight of the Night awards. The bout with Makhachev was rescheduled and was expected to take place on 30 October 2021 at UFC 267. However, yet again, dos Anjos was forced to pulled from the event, citing injury, and was replaced by Dan Hooker.

dos Anjos was scheduled to face Rafael Fiziev on 19 February 2022 at UFC Fight Night 201. However, the bout was postponed to UFC 272 due to visa issues with Fiziev. One week before the event, Fiziev was forced to withdraw due to testing positive for COVID-19, and was replaced by Renato Moicano on just 4 days notice at a catchweight of 160 pounds. dos Anjos won the fight via unanimous decision.

The bout against Fiziev was rescheduled for the third time for UFC on ESPN 39 on 9 July 2022. He lost the fight via knockout in round five.

==== Return to Welterweight ====
dos Anjos faced Bryan Barberena in a welterweight bout on 3 December 2022 at UFC on ESPN 42. He won via neck crank in the second round. From this bout, Dos Anjos surpassed Frankie Edgar for longest fight time and is the first fighter to reach 8 hours of fight time in UFC history.

dos Anjos was scheduled to face Vicente Luque on 15 July 2023 at UFC on ESPN 49. However, the pair was moved to instead fight on 12 August 2023 at UFC on ESPN: Luque vs. dos Anjos for unknown reasons. Dos Anjos lost the fight via unanimous decision.

dos Anjos faced Mateusz Gamrot in a lightweight bout on 9 March 2024 at UFC 299. He lost the fight via unanimous decision.

dos Anjos faced Geoff Neal on 26 October 2024 at UFC 308. He lost the fight via technical knockout in round one after being rendered unable to continue due to an ACL tear (knee injury).

==== Back to Lightweight ====
After a two-year layoff, dos Anjos faced Alexander Hernandez on 3 October 2026 at UFC 332. He lost the fight by technical knockout in the second round.

== Fighting style ==
Dos Anjos is known for his aggressive, high-volume striking, physical strength, and strong takedown capabilities. A southpaw, he will often come out aggressively in a Muay Thai stance, then use feints and kicks to back his opponent against the cage while swarming them with flurries of punches as well as takedowns. He is particularly noted for his left kick to the body and right hook to the head; he uses these strikes to limit his opponent's lateral movement as they attempt to get their backs away from the fence. Under trainer Jason Parillo, dos Anjos developed a refined boxing game in 2017. On the ground, he is noted for his powerful ground-and-pound, which includes punches and sharp elbow strikes. In addition to his striking, dos Anjos is a high-level black belt in Brazilian jiu-jitsu.

Dos Anjos trains out of Evolve MMA in Singapore and at Team RDA in California; he formerly trained at Kings MMA but left after losing to Eddie Alvarez. He is a Brazilian jiu-jitsu black belt under Aldo "Caveirinha" Januário.

== Personal life ==
After receiving a broken jaw in the Guida fight, dos Anjos now has a titanium fused jaw that he claims has broken some hands of later opponents. Dr. Johnny Benjamin has disagreed with dos Anjos, pointing out that the titanium plate in his jaw is measured in millimeters.

Dos Anjos is a Christian. Dos Anjos has three children with his wife, Cris. On 20 December 2019, dos Anjos revealed on social media that he and his family are now naturalized U.S. citizens.

== Championships and accomplishments ==
- Ultimate Fighting Championship
  - UFC Lightweight Championship (One time)
    - One successful title defense
  - Fight of the Night (Three times) vs. Tyson Griffin, Tony Ferguson, and Paul Felder
  - Submission of the Night (One time) vs. Terry Etim
  - Performance of the Night (Four times) vs. Donald Cerrone, Anthony Pettis, Benson Henderson, and Neil Magny
  - Second total fight time in UFC history (8:51:31) (behind Max Holloway)
    - First fighter to reach 8 hours of fight time in UFC history
  - Tied (Clay Guida & Charles Oliveira) for fifth most bouts in UFC history (37)
  - Tied (Belal Muhammad, Brad Tavares & Kamaru Usman) for second most unanimous decision wins in UFC history (11)
    - Tied for third most wins by decision in UFC history (12)
    - Tied (Francisco Trinaldo) for most unanimous decision wins in UFC Lightweight history (7)
    - Second most decision bouts in UFC history (22) (behind Angela Hill)
  - Fifth most significant strikes landed in UFC history (1848)
  - Seventh most total strikes landed in UFC history (2623)
  - Fifth most control time in UFC history (2:16:43)
  - UFC.com Awards
    - 2009: Ranked #8 Fight of the Year vs. Tyson Griffin
    - 2010: Ranked #8 Upset of the Year vs. Terry Etim
    - 2011: Ranked #3 Upset of the Year vs. George Sotiropoulos (Tied with Dennis Siver)
    - 2014: Ranked #8 Fighter of the Year & Ranked #2 Upset of the Year vs. Benson Henderson
    - 2015: Ranked #2 Fighter of the Year, Half-Year Awards: Biggest Upset of the 1HY vs. Anthony Pettis & Ranked #2 Upset of the Year vs. Anthony Pettis
    - 2016: Ranked #9 Fight of the Year vs. Tony Ferguson
    - 2017: Ranked #7 Fighter of the Year
- Fight Matrix
  - Lineal MMA Lightweight Champion (One time, Former)
- Combat Press
  - 2017 Comeback Fighter of the Year
- MMA Weekly
  - 2017 Comeback Fighter of the Year
- Slacky Awards
  - 2015 Gameplan of the Year vs. Anthony Pettis at UFC 185

=== Submission grappling ===
Brazilian jiu-jitsu

- World Jiu-Jitsu Championship
  - 2003 Purple Belt Peso Leve: 1st Place
- Brazilian National Jiu-Jitsu Championship
  - 2004 Brown Belt Peso Leve: 3rd Place
  - 2005 Brown Belt Peso Leve: 3rd place
- European Championship
  - 2006 Black Belt Peso Leve: 3rd place

== Mixed martial arts record ==
Professional record breakdown
50 matches	32 wins	18 losses
By knockout	5	6
By submission	11	0
By decision	16	12

Res.	Record	Opponent	Method	Event	Date	Round	Time	Location	Notes
Loss	32–18	Alexander Hernandez	TKO (punches)	UFC 332	3 October 2026	2	3:12	Salt Lake City, Utah, United States	Return to Lightweight.
Loss	32–17	Geoff Neal	TKO (knee injury)	UFC 308	26 October 2024	1	1:30	Abu Dhabi, United Arab Emirates	
Loss	32–16	Mateusz Gamrot	Decision (unanimous)	UFC 299	9 March 2024	3	5:00	Miami, Florida, United States	Lightweight bout.
Loss	32–15	Vicente Luque	Decision (unanimous)	UFC on ESPN: Luque vs. dos Anjos	12 August 2023	5	5:00	Las Vegas, Nevada, United States	
Win	32–14	Bryan Barberena	Submission (neck crank)	UFC on ESPN: Thompson vs. Holland	3 December 2022	2	3:20	Orlando, Florida, United States	Return to Welterweight.
Loss	31–14	Rafael Fiziev	KO (punches)	UFC on ESPN: dos Anjos vs. Fiziev	9 July 2022	5	0:18	Las Vegas, Nevada, United States	
Win	31–13	Renato Moicano	Decision (unanimous)	UFC 272	5 March 2022	5	5:00	Las Vegas, Nevada, United States	Catchweight (160 lb) bout.
Win	30–13	Paul Felder	Decision (split)	UFC Fight Night: Felder vs. dos Anjos	14 November 2020	5	5:00	Las Vegas, Nevada, United States	Return to Lightweight. Fight of the Night.
Loss	29–13	Michael Chiesa	Decision (unanimous)	UFC Fight Night: Blaydes vs. dos Santos	25 January 2020	3	5:00	Raleigh, North Carolina, United States	
Loss	29–12	Leon Edwards	Decision (unanimous)	UFC on ESPN: dos Anjos vs. Edwards	20 July 2019	5	5:00	San Antonio, Texas, United States	
Win	29–11	Kevin Lee	Submission (arm-triangle choke)	UFC Fight Night: dos Anjos vs. Lee	18 May 2019	4	3:47	Rochester, New York, United States	
Loss	28–11	Kamaru Usman	Decision (unanimous)	The Ultimate Fighter: Heavy Hitters Finale	30 November 2018	5	5:00	Las Vegas, Nevada, United States	
Loss	28–10	Colby Covington	Decision (unanimous)	UFC 225	9 June 2018	5	5:00	Chicago, Illinois, United States	For the interim UFC Welterweight Championship.
Win	28–9	Robbie Lawler	Decision (unanimous)	UFC on Fox: Lawler vs. dos Anjos	16 December 2017	5	5:00	Winnipeg, Manitoba, Canada	
Win	27–9	Neil Magny	Submission (arm-triangle choke)	UFC 215	9 September 2017	1	3:43	Edmonton, Alberta, Canada	Performance of the Night.
Win	26–9	Tarec Saffiedine	Decision (unanimous)	UFC Fight Night: Holm vs. Correia	17 June 2017	3	5:00	Kallang, Singapore	Welterweight debut.
Loss	25–9	Tony Ferguson	Decision (unanimous)	The Ultimate Fighter Latin America 3 Finale: dos Anjos vs. Ferguson	5 November 2016	5	5:00	Mexico City, Mexico	Fight of the Night.
Loss	25–8	Eddie Alvarez	TKO (punches)	UFC Fight Night: dos Anjos vs. Alvarez	7 July 2016	1	3:49	Las Vegas, Nevada, United States	Lost the UFC Lightweight Championship.
Win	25–7	Donald Cerrone	TKO (punches)	UFC on Fox: dos Anjos vs. Cowboy 2	19 December 2015	1	1:06	Orlando, Florida, United States	Defended the UFC Lightweight Championship. Performance of the Night.
Win	24–7	Anthony Pettis	Decision (unanimous)	UFC 185	14 March 2015	5	5:00	Dallas, Texas, United States	Won the UFC Lightweight Championship. Performance of the Night.
Win	23–7	Nate Diaz	Decision (unanimous)	UFC on Fox: dos Santos vs. Miocic	13 December 2014	3	5:00	Phoenix, Arizona, United States	Catchweight (160.6 lb) bout; Diaz missed weight.
Win	22–7	Benson Henderson	KO (punch)	UFC Fight Night: Henderson vs. dos Anjos	23 August 2014	1	2:32	Tulsa, Oklahoma, United States	Performance of the Night.
Win	21–7	Jason High	TKO (punches)	UFC Fight Night: Henderson vs. Khabilov	7 June 2014	2	3:36	Albuquerque, New Mexico, United States	
Loss	20–7	Khabib Nurmagomedov	Decision (unanimous)	UFC on Fox: Werdum vs. Browne	19 April 2014	3	5:00	Orlando, Florida, United States	
Win	20–6	Donald Cerrone	Decision (unanimous)	UFC Fight Night: Condit vs. Kampmann 2	28 August 2013	3	5:00	Indianapolis, Indiana, United States	
Win	19–6	Evan Dunham	Decision (unanimous)	UFC on FX: Belfort vs. Rockhold	18 May 2013	3	5:00	Jaraguá do Sul, Brazil	
Win	18–6	Mark Bocek	Decision (unanimous)	UFC 154	17 November 2012	3	5:00	Montreal, Quebec, Canada	
Win	17–6	Anthony Njokuani	Decision (unanimous)	UFC on Fuel TV: Muñoz vs. Weidman	11 July 2012	3	5:00	San Jose, California, United States	
Win	16–6	Kamal Shalorus	Submission (rear-naked choke)	UFC on Fuel TV: The Korean Zombie vs. Poirier	15 May 2012	1	1:40	Fairfax, Virginia, United States	
Loss	15–6	Gleison Tibau	Decision (split)	UFC 139	19 November 2011	3	5:00	San Jose, California, United States	
Win	15–5	George Sotiropoulos	KO (punch)	UFC 132	2 July 2011	1	0:59	Las Vegas, Nevada, United States	
Loss	14–5	Clay Guida	TKO (jaw injury)	UFC 117	7 August 2010	3	1:51	Oakland, California, United States	
Win	14–4	Terry Etim	Submission (armbar)	UFC 112	10 April 2010	2	4:30	Abu Dhabi, United Arab Emirates	Submission of the Night.
Win	13–4	Kyle Bradley	Decision (unanimous)	UFC Fight Night: Maynard vs. Diaz	11 January 2010	3	5:00	Fairfax, Virginia, United States	
Win	12–4	Rob Emerson	Decision (unanimous)	UFC 103	19 September 2009	3	5:00	Dallas, Texas, United States	
Loss	11–4	Tyson Griffin	Decision (unanimous)	UFC Fight Night: Condit vs. Kampmann	1 April 2009	3	5:00	Nashville, Tennessee, United States	Fight of the Night.
Loss	11–3	Jeremy Stephens	KO (punches)	UFC 91	15 November 2008	3	0:39	Las Vegas, Nevada, United States	
Win	11–2	Takafumi Otsuka	Decision (split)	Fury FC 6	12 July 2008	3	5:00	Rio de Janeiro, Brazil	
Win	10–2	Takaichi Hirayama	Submission (armbar)	Pancrase 190	1 June 2008	1	1:25	Tokyo, Japan	
Win	9–2	Gabriel Veiga	Decision (unanimous)	Fury FC 5	6 December 2007	3	5:00	São Paulo, Brazil	
Win	8–2	Danilo Cherman	Submission (kimura)	Fury FC 4	4 August 2007	2	3:38	Teresópolis, Brazil	
Win	7–2	Maurício Souza	Submission (rear-naked choke)	Xtreme FC: Brazil	29 April 2007	1	6:24	Rio de Janeiro, Brazil	
Win	6–2	Thiago Minu	Submission (rear-naked choke)	Xtreme FC: Brazil	29 April 2007	1	7:28	Rio de Janeiro, Brazil	
Win	5–2	Johil de Oliveira	Submission (rear-naked choke)	Juiz de Fora Fight 4	7 April 2007	1	2:50	Juiz de Fora, Brazil	
Win	4–2	Mateus Trindade	Decision (unanimous)	Shooto Brazil 11	24 March 2007	3	5:00	Rio de Janeiro, Brazil	
Win	3–2	Diogo Oliveira	Submission (armbar)	Top Fighter MMA 2	25 October 2006	2	N/A	Rio de Janeiro, Brazil	
Loss	2–2	Jorge Britto	Decision (split)	Arena BH Combat 2	4 June 2005	3	5:00	Belo Horizonte, Brazil	
Win	2–1	Felipe Arinelli	TKO (doctor stoppage)	Juiz de Fora Fight 2	26 April 2005	2	N/A	Juiz de Fora, Brazil	
Win	1–1	João Paulo Almeida	Decision (unanimous)	Arena BH Combat 1	9 October 2004	3	5:00	Belo Horizonte, Brazil	
Loss	0–1	Adriano Abu	Decision (split)	Juiz de Fora Fight 1	25 September 2004	3	5:00	Juiz de Fora, Brazil	

== Pay-per-view bouts ==
No	Event	Fight	Date	Venue	City	PPV buys
1.	UFC 185	Pettis vs. dos Anjos	14 March 2015	American Airlines Center	Dallas, Texas, United States	310,000

== See also ==
- List of current mixed martial arts champions
- List of current UFC fighters
- List of male mixed martial artists

Awards and achievements
Preceded by Anthony Pettis	7th UFC Lightweight Champion; March 14, 2015 – July 7, 2016	Succeeded by Eddie Alvarez
