= UFC on Fox: dos Anjos vs. Cowboy 2 =

UFC mixed martial arts event in 2015

- The poster for UFC on Fox: dos Anjos vs. Cowboy 2
- Promotion: Ultimate Fighting Championship
- Date: December 19, 2015
- Venue: Amway Center
- City: Orlando, Florida
- Attendance: 14,459
- Total gate: $1,710,000

Event chronology
UFC 194: Aldo vs. McGregor	UFC on Fox: dos Anjos vs. Cowboy 2	UFC 195: Lawler vs. Condit

UFC on Fox: dos Anjos vs. Cowboy 2 (also known as UFC on Fox 17) was a mixed martial arts event held on December 19, 2015, at the Amway Center in Orlando, Florida.

== Background ==
The event was headlined by a UFC Lightweight Championship bout between current champion Rafael dos Anjos and top contender Donald Cerrone. Dos Anjos won their first fight at UFC Fight Night: Condit vs. Kampmann 2 by unanimous decision.

Germaine de Randamie was scheduled to face Sarah Kaufman at the event. However, De Randamie pulled out of the fight on December 3 citing an injury. On December 11, she was replaced by promotional newcomer Valentina Shevchenko.

Charles Oliveira missed weight on his first attempt at the weigh ins, coming in at 150.5 lb. He was given additional time to make the weight limit, but made no attempts to cut further. Instead, he was fined 20 percent of his fight purse, which went to Myles Jury. This marked the third time that Oliveira missed weight in his UFC career.

By reporters and UFC fans alike, UFC on Fox 17 is regarded as one of the greatest cards that the UFC has ever offered on broadcast television. Future UFC stars such as Nate Diaz and Vicente Luque, and future champions Valentina Shevchenko, Charles Oliveira, and Francis Ngannou were all victorious on this card. Additionally, Kamaru Usman defeated Leon Edwards by unanimous decision; the two met in a rematch for the UFC Welterweight Championship on August 20, 2022, headlining UFC 278. Edwards won by knockout in the fifth round.

== Results ==
Main Card (Fox)
Weight class				Method	Round	Time	Notes
Lightweight	Rafael dos Anjos (c)	def.	Donald Cerrone	TKO (body kick and punches)	1	1:06	(Note: For the UFC Lightweight Championship.)
Heavyweight	Alistair Overeem	def.	Junior dos Santos	TKO (punches)	2	4:43
Lightweight	Nate Diaz	def.	Michael Johnson	Decision (unanimous) (29–28, 29–28, 29–28)	3	5:00
Women's Strawweight	Karolina Kowalkiewicz	def.	Randa Markos	Decision (unanimous) (29–28, 29–28, 30–27)	3	5:00
Preliminary Card (Fox Sports 1)
Catchweight (150.5 lb)	Charles Oliveira	def.	Myles Jury	Submission (guillotine choke)	1	3:04
Middleweight	Nate Marquardt	def.	C. B. Dollaway	KO (punch)	2	0:28
Women's Bantamweight	Valentina Shevchenko	def.	Sarah Kaufman	Decision (split) (28–29, 29–28, 29–28)	3	5:00
Middleweight	Tamdan McCrory	def.	Josh Samman	Submission (triangle choke)	3	4:10
Lightweight	Nik Lentz	def.	Danny Castillo	Decision (split) (28–29, 29–28, 30–27)	3	5:00
Featherweight	Cole Miller	vs.	Jim Alers	No Contest (accidental eye poke)	2	1:44	(Note: Accidental eye poke rendered Miller unable to continue.)
Preliminary Card (UFC Fight Pass)
Welterweight	Kamaru Usman	def.	Leon Edwards	Decision (unanimous) (29–28, 30–27, 29–28)	3	5:00
Welterweight	Vicente Luque	def.	Hayder Hassan	Technical Submission (anaconda choke)	1	2:13
Heavyweight	Francis Ngannou	def.	Luis Henrique	KO (punch)	2	2:53

== Bonus awards ==
The following fighters were awarded $50,000 bonuses:

- Fight of the Night: Nate Diaz vs. Michael Johnson
- Performance of the Night: Rafael dos Anjos and Vicente Luque

== Reported payout ==
The following is the reported payout to the fighters as reported to the Florida State Boxing Commission. It does not include sponsor money and also does not include the UFC's traditional "fight night" bonuses.

- Rafael dos Anjos: $300,000 (no win bonus) def. Donald Cerrone: $79,000
- Alistair Overeem: $542,857 (includes $200,000 win bonus) def. Junior dos Santos: $400,000
- Nate Diaz: $40,000 (includes $20,000 win bonus) def. Michael Johnson: $30,000
- Karolina Kowalkiewicz: $26,000 (includes $13,000 win bonus) def. Randa Markos: $12,000
- Charles Oliveira: $66,600 (includes $37,000 win bonus) def. Myles Jury: $30,000 ^
- Nate Marquardt: $98,000 (includes $49,000 win bonus) def. C.B. Dollaway: $40,000
- Valentina Shevchenko: $24,000 (includes $12,000 win bonus) def. Sarah Kaufman: $22,000
- Tamdan McCrory: $24,000 (includes $12,000 win bonus) def. Josh Samman: $10,000
- Nik Lentz: $70,000 (includes $35,000 win bonus) def. Danny Castillo: $39,000
- Cole Miller: $30,000 vs. Jim Alers: $10,000 <
- Kamaru Usman: $24,000 (includes $12,000 win bonus) def. Leon Edwards: $15,000
- Vicente Luque: $20,000 (includes $10,000 win bonus) def. Hayder Hassan: $10,000
- Francis Ngannou: $20,000 (includes $8,000 win bonus) def. Luis Henrique: $10,000

^ Oliviera was fined $7,400, 20 percent of his purse for failing to make the required weight for his fight with Myles Jury.
< Both fighters earned show money; bout declared No Contest.

== See also ==
- List of UFC events
- 2015 in UFC
