= Vicente Luque =

Brazilian-American mixed martial artist (born 1991)

- Born: Vicente Catta Preta Luque; November 27, 1991 (age 34); Westwood, New Jersey, U.S.
- Nickname: The Silent Assassin
- Nationality: Brazilian; American
- Height: 5 ft 11 in (180 cm)
- Weight: 185 lb (84 kg; 13.2 st)
- Division: Welterweight (2009-2026); Middleweight (2012, 2026-present)
- Reach: 75 1/2 in (192 cm)
- Fighting out of: Brasília, Distrito Federal, Brazil
- Team: Cerrado MMA (2007–present); Blackzilians (2014–2017); Kill Cliff FC (2017–present)
- Rank: Black belt in Brazilian Jiu-Jitsu under Toquinho Saldanha; Black belt in Luta Livre Esportiva under Erik Batista da Silva
- Years active: 2009–present

Mixed martial arts record
- Total: 38
- Wins: 24
- By knockout: 11
- By submission: 10
- By decision: 3
- Losses: 13
- By knockout: 2
- By submission: 3
- By decision: 8
- Draws: 1

Other information
- Website: vicenteluque.com
- Mixed martial arts record from Sherdog

Vicente Catta Preta Luque (born November 27, 1991) is a Brazilian and American professional mixed martial artist. He currently competes in the welterweight division of the Ultimate Fighting Championship (UFC).

== Background ==
Luque was born in Westwood, New Jersey, on November 27, 1991, to a Colombian-born Brazilian mother and a Chilean father. His maternal grandmother was a diplomat, and as a result, his mother was mostly raised in Chile, where she met and married his father before relocating to the United States. Luque was raised trilingual, speaking Portuguese, Spanish and English. Luque began training in various forms of martial arts as a youngster, initially karate at the age of three. When Vicente was six, his parents separated and he moved to Brazil with his mom, where he continued training karate until the age of ten. After a spell with soccer, he started training in Muay Thai and Brazilian jiu-jitsu as a teenager before transitioning to mixed martial arts in 2008. In 2021, he was promoted to black belt in both Brazilian Jiu Jitsu and Luta Livre on the same day.

== Mixed martial arts career ==
=== Early career ===
Luque made his professional mixed martial arts debut in June 2009. He compiled a record of 7–4–1, competing for various regional promotions in Brazil before trying out for The Ultimate Fighter in early 2014.

=== The Ultimate Fighter ===
In February 2015, it was announced that Luque was one of the fighters selected to be on The Ultimate Fighter: American Top Team vs. Blackzilians.

In his first fight on the show, Luque faced Nathan Coy. He won the fight by submission in the second round.

In the semifinals, Luque faced off against Hayder Hassan. He lost the fight via split decision.

=== Ultimate Fighting Championship ===
==== 2015 ====
Luque made his official debut for the promotion on July 12, 2015, at The Ultimate Fighter 21 Finale, where he faced fellow castmate Michael Graves. He lost the fight via unanimous decision.

Luque next faced Hayder Hassan in a rematch on December 19, 2015, at UFC on Fox 17. He won the fight by submission in the first round and was awarded a Performance of the Night bonus.

==== 2016 ====
Luque faced Álvaro Herrera on July 7, 2016, at UFC Fight Night 90. He won the fight via submission in the second round.

Luque faced Héctor Urbina on September 24, 2016, at UFC Fight Night 95. Luque won the fight via first-round knockout, thereby earning his second Performance of the Night bonus.

Luque returned to face Belal Muhammad on November 12, 2016, at UFC 205. He won the fight via knockout in the first round.

==== 2017 ====
Luque faced Leon Edwards on March 18, 2017, at UFC Fight Night 107. He lost the fight by unanimous decision.

Luque faced Niko Price, replacing an injured Luan Chagas on 11 day notice, on October 28, 2017, at UFC Fight Night 119. After knocking Price down, Luque won the fight by submission via D'Arce choke midway through the second round.

==== 2018 ====
Luque faced Chad Laprise on May 19, 2018, at UFC Fight Night 129. He won the fight via knockout in the first round.

Luque faced promotional newcomer Jalin Turner on October 6, 2018, at UFC 229. He won the fight via knockout in the first round.

==== 2019 ====
Luque faced Bryan Barberena on February 17, 2019, at UFC on ESPN 1. After two competitive rounds that saw both men rock each other, Luque won the fight by TKO at the end of the third round after knocking Barberena down with a knee and finishing with punches. With this win, he became the first man to give Barberena his first stoppage loss by TKO. This fight earned him the Fight of the Night award.

Luque was expected to face Neil Magny on May 18, 2019, at UFC Fight Night 152. However, it was reported on May 13, 2019, that Magny pulled out of the bout due to testing positive for Di-Hydroxy-LGD-4033, and he was replaced by newcomer Derrick Krantz. Luque won the fight via technical knockout in round one.

Luque faced Mike Perry on August 10, 2019, at UFC on ESPN+ 14. He won the fight via split decision. This fight earned him the Fight of the Night award.

Luque faced Stephen Thompson on November 2, 2019, at UFC 244. He lost the fight via unanimous decision. This fight earned him the Fight of the Night award.

==== 2020 ====
Luque was scheduled to face Randy Brown on April 11, 2020, at UFC Fight Night: Overeem vs. Harris. Due to the COVID-19 pandemic, the event was eventually postponed.

In a quick turnaround, Luque was scheduled to face Niko Price in a rematch on April 18, 2020, at UFC 249. However, on April 9, Dana White, the president of UFC announced that this event was postponed and the bout eventually took place on May 9, 2020. He won the fight via technical knockout due to doctor stoppage in round three.

The bout with Randy Brown was rescheduled and took place on August 1, 2020, at UFC Fight Night 173. Utilizing low kicks and dropping Brown multiple times, Luque eventually won the fight via knockout in the second round. This win earned him the Performance of the Night award.

==== 2021 ====
Luque faced Tyron Woodley on March 27, 2021, at UFC 260. After hurting Woodley multiple times on the feet, Luque won the fight via D'Arce choke submission in round one. This fight earned him the Fight of the Night award.

Luque faced Michael Chiesa on August 7, 2021, at UFC 265. He won the fight via D'Arce choke submission in round one. This fight earned him the Performance of the Night award.

Luque was the emergency backup for the UFC Welterweight Championship rematch between Kamaru Usman and Colby Covington in the main event of UFC 268. However, Luque weighed in at 172.2 pounds, 2.2 pounds over the welterweight limit. Usman and Covington both made weight and the championship bout proceeded as scheduled.

==== 2022 ====
Luque faced Belal Muhammad in a rematch on April 16, 2022, at UFC on ESPN 34. He lost the fight via unanimous decision.

Luque faced Geoff Neal on August 6, 2022, at UFC on ESPN 40. He lost the fight via knockout in round three.

==== 2023 ====
Luque was scheduled to face Rafael dos Anjos on July 15, 2023, at UFC on ESPN 49. However, the pair was moved to instead fight on August 12, 2023, at UFC on ESPN: Luque vs. dos Anjos for unknown reasons. Luque won the fight via unanimous decision.

Luque was scheduled to face Ian Machado Garry on December 16, 2023, at UFC 296. However, the bout was scrapped after Garry withdrew due to contracting pneumonia the week of the event.

==== 2024 ====
Luque was scheduled to face Sean Brady on March 30, 2024, at UFC on ESPN 54. However, Brady indicated he never signed a bout agreement due to dealing with an injury, and was replaced by Joaquin Buckley. Luque lost the fight via technical knockout in round two.

Luque was scheduled to face former WEC and Strikeforce Welterweight Champion Nick Diaz on August 3, 2024 at UFC on ABC 7. However, due to travel issues, the bout was postponed and was re-scheduled to take place on December 7, 2024 at UFC 310. In turn, Diaz withdrew from the bout for unknown reasons and was replaced by Themba Gorimbo. Luque won the fight via an anaconda choke submission under one minute into the first round. This fight earned him another Performance of the Night award.

==== 2025 ====
Luque faced Kevin Holland on June 7, 2025 at UFC 316. He lost the fight via a D'Arce choke submission in the second round.

Luque was scheduled to face Santiago Ponzinibbio on October 11, 2025, at UFC Fight Night 261. However, Ponzinibbio was forced to pull out from the event due to injury, and was replaced by Joel Álvarez. Luque lost the fight by unanimous decision.

==== 2026 ====
Returning to the middleweight division, Luque was scheduled to face Kyle Daukaus on April 11, 2026 at UFC 327. However, Daukaus withdrew after being re‑scheduled for the UFC Freedom 250 event in June and was replaced by former interim UFC Middleweight Championship challenger Kelvin Gastelum. Luque won the fight via an anaconda choke submission in the first round.

Luque faced Tresean Gore on August 15, 2026, at UFC 330. He lost the fight by unanimous decision.

== Personal life ==
Luque and his wife Carol have a son.

== Championships and accomplishments ==
- Ultimate Fighting Championship
  - Performance of the Night (Five times) vs. Hayder Hassan, Héctor Urbina, Randy Brown, Michael Chiesa and Themba Gorimbo
  - Fight of the Night (Four times) vs. Bryan Barberena, Mike Perry, Stephen Thompson and Tyron Woodley
    - Tied (Matt Brown & Stephen Thompson) for second most Post-Fight bonuses in UFC Welterweight division history (9) (behind Chris Lytle)
  - Tied (Thiago Alves, Li Jingliang & Neil Magny) for second most knockouts in UFC Welterweight division history (8) (behind Matt Brown)
  - Most brabo/D'arce choke submission wins in UFC history (4)
  - Tied (Makwan Amirkhani & Charles Oliveira) for most anaconda choke submission wins in UFC history (3)
  - Second most finishes in UFC Welterweight division history (14) (behind Matt Brown)
    - Fourth most first-round finishes in UFC history (10)
  - Tied (Josh Koscheck) for fifth most bouts in UFC Welterweight division history (24)
    - Tied (Matt Brown, Dustin Poirier & Max Holloway) for fifth most finishes in UFC history (15)
  - Tied (Demian Maia & Chris Lytle) for second most submissions in UFC Welterweight division history (6)
  - Tied (Uroš Medić & Anthony Johnson) for most first-round knockouts in UFC Welterweight division history (5)
  - Tied (Kamaru Usman) for fourth most wins in UFC Welterweight division history (16)
  - Fastest anaconda choke submission in UFC history (0:52) (vs. Themba Gorimbo)
  - UFC Honors Awards
    - 2021: Fan's Choice Submission of the Year Nominee vs. Tyron Woodley
  - UFC.com Awards
    - 2019: Ranked #5 Fight of the Year vs. Bryan Barberena
    - 2020: Ranked #10 Fight of the Year vs. Niko Price 2
    - 2021: Ranked #3 Submission of the Year vs. Tyron Woodley & Ranked #6 Submission of the Year vs. Michael Chiesa
- MMA Junkie
  - 2019 February Fight of the Month vs. Bryan Barberena
  - 2020 May Fight of the Month vs. Niko Price
  - 2021 March Fight of the Month vs. Tyron Woodley
  - 2021 August Submission of the Month vs. Michael Chiesa
- CBS Sports
  - 2019 #3 Ranked UFC Fight of the Year vs. Bryan Barberena

== Mixed martial arts record ==
Professional record breakdown
38 matches	24 wins	13 losses
By knockout	11	2
By submission	10	3
By decision	3	8
Draws	1	

Res.	Record	Opponent	Method	Event	Date	Round	Time	Location	Notes
Loss	24–13–1	Tresean Gore	Decision (unanimous)	UFC 330	August 15, 2026	3	5:00	Philadelphia, Pennsylvania, United States	
Win	24–12–1	Kelvin Gastelum	Submission (anaconda choke)	UFC 327	April 11, 2026	1	4:08	Miami, Florida, United States	Return to Middleweight.
Loss	23–12–1	Joel Álvarez	Decision (unanimous)	UFC Fight Night: Oliveira vs. Gamrot	October 11, 2025	3	5:00	Rio de Janeiro, Brazil	
Loss	23–11–1	Kevin Holland	Submission (anaconda choke)	UFC 316	June 7, 2025	2	1:03	Newark, New Jersey, United States	
Win	23–10–1	Themba Gorimbo	Technical Submission (anaconda choke)	UFC 310	December 7, 2024	1	0:52	Las Vegas, Nevada, United States	Performance of the Night.
Loss	22–10–1	Joaquin Buckley	TKO (punches)	UFC on ESPN: Blanchfield vs. Fiorot	March 30, 2024	2	3:17	Atlantic City, New Jersey, United States	
Win	22–9–1	Rafael dos Anjos	Decision (unanimous)	UFC on ESPN: Luque vs. dos Anjos	August 12, 2023	5	5:00	Las Vegas, Nevada, United States	
Loss	21–9–1	Geoff Neal	KO (punches)	UFC on ESPN: Santos vs. Hill	August 6, 2022	3	2:01	Las Vegas, Nevada, United States	
Loss	21–8–1	Belal Muhammad	Decision (unanimous)	UFC on ESPN: Luque vs. Muhammad 2	April 16, 2022	5	5:00	Las Vegas, Nevada, United States	
Win	21–7–1	Michael Chiesa	Submission (brabo choke)	UFC 265	August 7, 2021	1	3:25	Houston, Texas, United States	Performance of the Night.
Win	20–7–1	Tyron Woodley	Submission (brabo choke)	UFC 260	March 27, 2021	1	3:56	Las Vegas, Nevada, United States	Fight of the Night.
Win	19–7–1	Randy Brown	KO (knee and punches)	UFC Fight Night: Brunson vs. Shahbazyan	August 1, 2020	2	4:56	Las Vegas, Nevada, United States	Performance of the Night.
Win	18–7–1	Niko Price	TKO (doctor stoppage)	UFC 249	May 9, 2020	3	3:37	Jacksonville, Florida, United States	
Loss	17–7–1	Stephen Thompson	Decision (unanimous)	UFC 244	November 2, 2019	3	5:00	New York City, New York, United States	Fight of the Night.
Win	17–6–1	Mike Perry	Decision (split)	UFC Fight Night: Shevchenko vs. Carmouche 2	August 10, 2019	3	5:00	Montevideo, Uruguay	Fight of the Night.
Win	16–6–1	Derrick Krantz	TKO (punches)	UFC Fight Night: dos Anjos vs. Lee	May 18, 2019	1	3:52	Rochester, New York, United States	
Win	15–6–1	Bryan Barberena	TKO (knees and punches)	UFC on ESPN: Ngannou vs. Velasquez	February 17, 2019	3	4:54	Phoenix, Arizona, United States	Fight of the Night.
Win	14–6–1	Jalin Turner	KO (punches)	UFC 229	October 6, 2018	1	3:52	Las Vegas, Nevada, United States	
Win	13–6–1	Chad Laprise	KO (punches)	UFC Fight Night: Maia vs. Usman	May 19, 2018	1	4:16	Santiago, Chile	
Win	12–6–1	Niko Price	Submission (brabo choke)	UFC Fight Night: Brunson vs. Machida	October 28, 2017	2	4:08	São Paulo, Brazil	
Loss	11–6–1	Leon Edwards	Decision (unanimous)	UFC Fight Night: Manuwa vs. Anderson	March 18, 2017	3	5:00	London, England	
Win	11–5–1	Belal Muhammad	KO (punches)	UFC 205	November 12, 2016	1	1:19	New York City, New York, United States	
Win	10–5–1	Héctor Urbina	KO (punch)	UFC Fight Night: Cyborg vs. Länsberg	September 24, 2016	1	1:00	Brasília, Brazil	Performance of the Night.
Win	9–5–1	Álvaro Herrera	Submission (brabo choke)	UFC Fight Night: dos Anjos vs. Alvarez	July 7, 2016	2	3:52	Las Vegas, Nevada, United States	
Win	8–5–1	Hayder Hassan	Technical Submission (anaconda choke)	UFC on Fox: dos Anjos vs. Cowboy 2	December 19, 2015	1	2:13	Orlando, Florida, United States	Performance of the Night.
Loss	7–5–1	Michael Graves	Decision (unanimous)	The Ultimate Fighter: American Top Team vs. Blackzilians Finale	July 12, 2015	3	5:00	Las Vegas, Nevada, United States	
Win	7–4–1	Paulistenio Rocha	Decision (unanimous)	Açaí do Japa Fight 1	June 21, 2014	3	5:00	Brasília, Brazil	
Loss	6–4–1	Carlos Alexandre Pereira	Submission (arm-triangle choke)	SMASH Fight 2	July 13, 2013	3	0:44	Curitiba, Brazil	Catchweight (176 lb) bout.
Win	6–3–1	Marcelo Lisboa	TKO (punches)	Capital Fight 5	May 10, 2013	1	1:31	Brasília, Brazil	
Win	5–3–1	Yuri Moura	Submission (anaconda choke)	Imperium MMA Pro 2	March 9, 2013	2	1:07	Salvador, Brazil	
Loss	4–3–1	Alfredo Souza	Decision (split)	Champion Fights 1	August 4, 2012	3	5:00	Salvador, Brazil	Return to Welterweight.
Win	4–2–1	Thiago Santos	TKO (punches)	Spartan MMA 2012	April 28, 2012	1	4:50	São Luís, Brazil	Middleweight debut.
Win	3–2–1	Darlan Almeida	Submission (arm-triangle choke)	Demo Fight 6	November 19, 2011	1	3:25	Salvador, Brazil	
Loss	2–2–1	Marcos Antonio Santana	Decision (unanimous)	Jungle Fight 27	April 21, 2011	3	5:00	Brasília, Brazil	
Draw	2–1–1	Rodrigo Medeiros	Draw (unanimous)	Shooto Brazil 18	September 17, 2010	3	5:00	Brasília, Brazil	
Loss	2–1	Felipe Portela	Submission (triangle armbar)	Capital Fight 2	June 5, 2010	3	3:00	Brasília, Brazil	
Win	2–0	Pedro Borges Dos Santos	Submission (guillotine choke)	The Gladiators 2	October 24, 2009	1	3:58	Guará, Brazil	
Win	1–0	Andre Playboy	TKO (punches)	Fight Club 300	June 27, 2009	1	2:52	Brasília, Brazil	Welterweight debut.

Exhibition record breakdown		
2 matches	1 win	1 loss
By submission	1	0
By decision	0	1

Res.	Record	Opponent	Method	Event	Date	Round	Time	Location	Notes
Loss	1–1	Hayder Hassan	Decision (split)	The Ultimate Fighter: American Top Team vs. Blackzilians	July 8, 2015 (airdate)	3	5:00	Coconut Creek, Florida, United States	The Ultimate Fighter 21.
Win	1–0	Nathan Coy	Submission (anaconda choke)	The Ultimate Fighter: American Top Team vs. Blackzilians	June 3, 2015 (airdate)	3	2:26	Boca Raton, Florida, United States	The Ultimate Fighter 21.

== See also ==
- List of current UFC fighters
- List of male mixed martial artists
