= Michael Graves (fighter) =

American mixed martial arts fighter

- Born: Michael Lee Graves; January 8, 1991 (age 35); Maumee, Ohio, United States
- Nationality: American
- Height: 5 ft 10 in (178 cm)
- Weight: 170 lb (77 kg; 12 st)
- Division: Welterweight
- Reach: 71 in (180 cm)
- Stance: Orthodox
- Fighting out of: Coconut Creek, Florida, United States
- Team: American Top Team
- Years active: 2013–present

Mixed martial arts record
- Total: 15
- Wins: 11
- By knockout: 5
- By submission: 3
- By decision: 3
- Losses: 2
- By knockout: 2
- Draws: 2

Other information
- Mixed martial arts record from Sherdog

Michael Lee Graves (born January 8, 1991) is an American mixed martial artist who most recently competed in the Welterweight division of Titan FC, where he is the former Welterweight Champion. A professional competitor since 2013, he formerly competed for the UFC and was also a contestant on The Ultimate Fighter: American Top Team vs. Blackzilians.

== Background ==
Born and raised in Maumee, Ohio, he graduated from Maumee High School (Ohio) where he competed in wrestling. Graves began training in mixed martial arts in 2009 and began competing as an amateur in 2010.

== Mixed martial arts career ==
Graves made his professional mixed martial arts debut in February 2013. He compiled a record of 4–0, competing for various regional promotions in Florida where he finished all of his opponents before trying out for The Ultimate Fighter in late 2014.

=== The Ultimate Fighter ===
In February 2015, it was announced that Graves was one of the fighters selected to be on The Ultimate Fighter: American Top Team vs. Blackzilians.

In his first fight on the show, Graves faced Kamaru Usman. He lost the closely contested bout via majority decision.

In his second fight on the show, Graves faced off against Jason Jackson. After nearly being finished in the fight's opening moments (when he was dropped by a groin strike and subsequent follow up punches), he won the fight via submission in the first round.

=== Ultimate Fighting Championship ===
Graves made his official debut for the promotion on July 12, 2015, at The Ultimate Fighter 21 Finale where he faced fellow castmate Vicente Luque. He won the fight via unanimous decision.

Graves was expected to face Danny Roberts on December 10, 2015, at UFC Fight Night 80. However, Graves was forced out of the bout with an injury and replaced by Nathan Coy.

Graves next faced Randy Brown on April 16, 2016, at UFC on Fox 19. He won the fight via submission in the second round.

Graves next faced Bojan Veličković on July 30, 2016, at UFC 201. The bout was declared a majority draw (30-27, 28-28, 28-28).

Graves was expected to face Sérgio Moraes on November 19, 2016, at UFC Fight Night 100. However, Graves was removed from the fight on October 3 after he was arrested on a misdemeanor battery charge and was replaced by Zak Ottow. In turn, he was released from the promotion in April 2017.

=== Post-UFC career ===
After the release from UFC, Graves signed with Fight Nights Global, where he suffered his first professional career loss against Nikolay Aleksakhin in his promotional debut at Fight Nights Global 74. After the bout Graves fought to a draw with Murat Khasanov at Fight Nights Global 87.

==== Titan FC ====
After the brief stint in the Russian promotion, Graves signed with Titan FC again where he faced Gegg Ellis at Titan FC 51 on December 28, 2018. He won the fight via unanimous decision.

Next he faced Jared Gooden for the interim Titan Welterweight Championship at Titan FC 52 on March 15, 2019. Graves won the fight via unanimous decision, becoming the Titan FC interim Welterweight Champion as was subsequently promoted to undisputed Welterweight Champion as Uros Jurisic was stripped of the title.

Graves was expected to make his first title defense against Kamal Magomedov at Titan FC 57, but withdrew from the bout due to an injury. Magomedov fought Italo Goncalves for the interim Welterweight Championship instead and won the title via submission. Graves was scheduled to face Magomedov in a title unification bout at Titan FC 59 on February 28, 2020, but Magomed withdrew from the bout. Graves then headlined Titan FC 59 against Yuri Villefort. Graves successfully defended his title by knocking out Villefort in the fourth round.

Graves faced Oton Jasse at Titan FC 65 on November 22, 2020. At weigh-ins, Graves missed weight by 2 pounds and was therefore stripped of the title. He won the bout via guillotine choke in the first round.

In October 2021, news about Graves tweeting threats to mixed martial arts reporter Amy Kaplan and UFC president Dana White emerged. Simultaneously, Titan FC COO Lex McMahon revealed that Graves had not been under contract with the organization for a while.

== Championships and accomplishments ==
Titan Fighting Championship

- Titan FC Interim Welterweight Championship (One time; former)
- Titan FC Welterweight Championship (One time; former)
  - One successful title defense

== Mixed martial arts record ==
Professional record breakdown
15 matches	11 wins	2 losses
By knockout	5	2
By submission	3	0
By decision	3	0
Draws	2	

Res.	Record	Opponent	Method	Event	Date	Round	Time	Location	Notes
Loss	11–2–2	Vitaliy Slipenko	TKO (leg injury)	ACA 206	August 15, 2026	1	5:00	Moscow, Russia	
Win	11–1–2	Alexey Makhno	TKO (doctor stoppage)	ACA 190	August 15, 2025	1	5:00	Moscow, Russia	Catchweight (173.3 lb) bout; Makhno missed weight.
Win	10–1–2	Oton Jasse	Submission (guillotine choke)	Titan FC 65	November 22, 2020	1	1:17	Santo Domingo, Dominican Republic	Graves missed weight (172 lb) and was stripped of the Titan FC Welterweight Championship. Only Jasse was eligible to win the title.
Win	9–1–2	Yuri Villefort	TKO (punches)	Titan FC 59	February 28, 2020	4	4:40	Fort Lauderdale, Florida, United States	Defended the Titan FC Welterweight Championship.
Win	8–1–2	Jared Gooden	Decision (unanimous)	Titan FC 53	March 15, 2019	5	5:00	Fort Lauderdale, Florida, United States	Won the interim Titan FC Welterweight Championship. Later promoted to undisputed champion.
Win	7–1–2	Gregg Ellis	Decision (unanimous)	Titan FC 51	December 21, 2018	3	5:00	Almaty, Kazakhstan	
Draw	6–1–2	Murat Khasanov	Draw (majority)	Fight Nights Global 87	May 19, 2018	3	5:00	Rostov-on-Don, Russia	
Loss	6–1–1	Nikolay Aleksakhin	TKO (punches)	Fight Nights Global 74	September 29, 2017	3	3:06	Moscow, Russia	
Draw	6–0–1	Bojan Veličković	Draw (majority)	UFC 201	July 30, 2016	3	5:00	Atlanta, Georgia, United States	
Win	6–0	Randy Brown	Submission (rear-naked choke)	UFC on Fox: Teixeira vs. Evans	April 16, 2016	2	2:31	Tampa, Florida, United States	
Win	5–0	Vicente Luque	Decision (unanimous)	The Ultimate Fighter: American Top Team vs. Blackzilians Finale	July 12, 2015	3	5:00	Las Vegas, Nevada, United States	
Win	4–0	Rafael Souza	Submission (rear-naked choke)	Titan FC 31	October 31, 2014	2	2:37	Tampa, Florida, United States	
Win	3–0	Rico Farrington	TKO (punches)	More Than Conquerors: In the Beginning	April 3, 2014	1	2:46	Fort Lauderdale, Florida, United States	Catchweight (180 lb) bout.
Win	2–0	Danny Finz	TKO (punches)	Fight Time 15	June 21, 2013	1	1:26	Fort Lauderdale, Florida, United States	
Win	1–0	Nicolas Ryske	KO (punches)	Fight Time 13	February 15, 2013	1	1:48	Fort Lauderdale, Florida, United States	Welterweight debut.

== Mixed martial arts exhibition record ==
Professional record breakdown
2 matches	1 win	1 loss
By knockout	0	0
By submission	1	0
By decision	0	1

Res.	Record	Opponent	Method	Event	Date	Round	Time	Location	Notes
Win	1–1	Jason Jackson	Submission (rear-naked choke)	The Ultimate Fighter: American Top Team vs. Blackzilians	July 1, 2015 (airdate)	1	3:01	Coconut Creek, Florida, United States	The Ultimate Fighter 21 Semifinals round.
Loss	0–1	Kamaru Usman	Decision (majority)	The Ultimate Fighter: American Top Team vs. Blackzilians	April 22, 2015 (airdate)	2	5:00	Boca Raton, Florida, United States	The Ultimate Fighter 21 Quarterfinals round.

== See also ==
- List of current UFC fighters
- List of male mixed martial artists
