= Hayder Hassan =

American mixed martial arts fighter

- Born: October 20, 1982 (age 43); Fort Lauderdale, Florida, U.S.
- Other names: Hulk
- Height: 5 ft 10 in (1.78 m)
- Weight: 170 lb (77 kg; 12 st)
- Division: Welterweight
- Reach: 71 1/2 in (182 cm)
- Stance: Orthodox
- Fighting out of: Coconut Creek, Florida, U.S.
- Team: American Top Team
- Years active: 2009–2019

Mixed martial arts record
- Total: 14
- Wins: 9
- By knockout: 6
- By decision: 3
- Losses: 5
- By knockout: 1
- By submission: 2
- By decision: 1
- By disqualification: 1

Other information
- Mixed martial arts record from Sherdog

Hayder Hassan (Arabic: حيدر حسن, born October 20, 1982) is an American former mixed martial artist. A professional competitor from 2009 to 2019, he has competed for the UFC, Strikeforce, Titan FC, King of the Cage, the Xtreme Fighting Championships, Brave Combat Federation and was a contestant on The Ultimate Fighter: American Top Team vs. Blackzilians as well as The Ultimate Fighter: Redemption.

== Background ==
Born and raised in Florida, Hassan and his family were refugees from Baghdad, Iraq who relocated in 1977. His father, who was a physician, personally trekked from their home in Iraq to an American embassy. Hassan attended Cardinal Gibbons High School, where he was a standout in wrestling and football before graduating from Florida State University after which he had planned to attend medical school and majored in sociology. However, after leaving his job as a sales representative for a pharmaceutical firm, he transitioned to a career in MMA and began training at the American Top Team academy in Coconut Creek.

== Mixed martial arts career ==
=== The Ultimate Fighter ===
Hassan competed on the 21st season of the reality show The Ultimate Fighter, representing American Top Team and making it to the final. In his first fight he defeated Andrews Nakahara via TKO in the first round. In his second fight he defeated Felipe Portela by majority decision. In his third fight he faced Vicente Luque and won via split decision.

=== Ultimate Fighting Championship ===
Hassan made his debut with the Ultimate Fighting Championship on July 12, 2015 against Kamaru Usman at The Ultimate Fighter 21 Finale. He lost the bout via arm triangle choke submission in the second round.

Hassan next faced former opponent Vicente Luque at UFC on Fox 17 on December 19, 2015. He lost the fight via anaconda choke technical submission in the first round and was subsequently released from the promotion.

=== The Ultimate Fighter: Redemption ===
In February 2017, it was revealed that Hassan would compete again on the UFC's reality show in the 25th season on The Ultimate Fighter: Redemption. Hassan was the fifth pick overall for Team Garbrandt. He faced Dhiego Lima in the opening round and lost by unanimous decision. He defeated former world title contender Joe Stevenson by knockout in the wildcard bout, but ended up losing to eventual season winner Jesse Taylor via rear naked choke submission in the first round.

== Mixed martial arts record ==
Professional record breakdown
14 matches	9 wins	5 losses
By knockout	6	1
By submission	0	2
By decision	3	1
By disqualification	0	1

Res.	Record	Opponent	Method	Event	Date	Round	Time	Location	Notes
Loss	9–5	Carl Booth	Decision (unanimous)	Brave CF 32	December 14, 2019	3	5:00	Bishkek, Kyrgyzstan	
Win	9–4	Movsar Bokov	Decision (unanimous)	M-1 Challenge 103	August 3, 2019	3	5:00	Shenzhen, China	
Win	8–4	Hemant Wadekar	TKO (knee and punches)	Kumite 1 League	September 30, 2018	1	0:34	Mumbai, India	
Win	7–4	Pavel Kusch	Decision (unanimous)	Phoenix FC 6	April 5, 2018	3	5:00	Abu Dhabi, United Arab Emirates	
Loss	6–4	Roger Huerta	DQ (elbows to back of head)	Phoenix FC 4	December 22, 2017	2	0:53	Abu Dhabi, United Arab Emirates	
Loss	6–3	Vicente Luque	Technical Submission (anaconda choke)	UFC on Fox: dos Anjos vs. Cowboy 2	December 19, 2015	1	2:13	Orlando, Florida, United States	
Loss	6–2	Kamaru Usman	Submission (arm-triangle choke)	The Ultimate Fighter: American Top Team vs. Blackzilians Finale	July 12, 2015	2	1:19	Las Vegas, Nevada, United States	The Ultimate Fighter 21 Welterweight Tournament Final.
Win	6–1	Felipe Portela	TKO (punch)	Titan FC 31	October 31, 2014	1	3:23	Tampa, Florida, United States	
Win	5–1	Jason Jackson	TKO (punches)	CFA 12	October 12, 2013	3	2:32	Coral Gables, Florida, United States	
Win	4–1	Robert Thompson	Decision (unanimous)	Mixed Fighting Alliance: New Generation 1	April 30, 2010	3	5:00	Miami, Florida, United States	
Win	3–1	Ryan Keenan	KO (punch)	Strikeforce: Miami	January 30, 2010	2	2:42	Miami, Florida, United States	
Loss	2–1	Gerardo Julio Gallegos	TKO (punches)	XFC 9	September 5, 2009	1	0:57	Tampa, Florida, United States	
Win	2–0	Roy McDonald	TKO (punches)	Raging Wolf 3	April 24, 2009	1	3:19	Fort Lauderdale, Florida, United States	
Win	1–0	Kenny Allen	TKO (punches)	KOTC: Hurricane	February 21, 2009	1	0:09	Fort Lauderdale, Florida, United States	Welterweight debut.

=== Mixed martial arts exhibition record ===
Exhibition record breakdown		
6 matches	4 wins	2 losses
By knockout	2	0
By submission	0	1
By decision	2	1

Res.	Record	Opponent	Method	Event	Date	Round	Time	Location	Notes
Loss	4–2	Jesse Taylor	Submission (rear-naked-choke)	The Ultimate Fighter: Redemption	June 21, 2017 (airdate)	1	1:24	Las Vegas, Nevada, United States	TUF 25 Quarter-finals Round.
Win	4–1	Joe Stevenson	KO (punch)	The Ultimate Fighter: Redemption	June 7, 2017 (airdate)	1	0:18	Las Vegas, Nevada, United States	TUF 25 Wild Card Fight.
Loss	3–1	Dhiego Lima	Decision (unanimous)	The Ultimate Fighter: Redemption	May 17, 2017 (airdate)	2	5:00	Las Vegas, Nevada, United States	TUF 25 Preliminary Round.
Win	3–0	Vicente Luque	Decision (split)	The Ultimate Fighter: American Top Team vs. Blackzilians	July 8, 2015 (airdate)	3	5:00	Coconut Creek, Florida, United States	TUF 21.
win	2–0	Felipe Portela	Decision (majority)	The Ultimate Fighter: American Top Team vs. Blackzilians	June 10, 2015 (airdate)	2	5:00	Boca Raton, Florida, United States	TUF 21.
Win	1–0	Andrews Nakahara	TKO (punches)	The Ultimate Fighter: American Top Team vs. Blackzilians	May 20, 2015 (airdate)	1	0:48	Boca Raton, Florida, United States	TUF 21.

== See also ==
- List of male mixed martial artists
