= UFC Fight Night: Till vs. Masvidal =

UFC mixed martial arts event in 2019

- The poster for UFC Fight Night: Till vs. Masvidal
- Promotion: Ultimate Fighting Championship
- Date: March 16, 2019
- Venue: The O_{2} Arena
- City: London, England
- Attendance: 16,602
- Total gate: $2,400,000

Event chronology
UFC Fight Night: Lewis vs. dos Santos	UFC Fight Night: Till vs. Masvidal	UFC Fight Night: Thompson vs. Pettis

UFC Fight Night: Till vs. Masvidal (also known as UFC Fight Night 147 or UFC on ESPN+ 5) was a mixed martial arts event produced by the Ultimate Fighting Championship held on March 16, 2019 at The O_{2} Arena in London, England.

== Background ==
A welterweight bout between former UFC Welterweight Championship challenger Darren Till and Jorge Masvidal served as the event headliner.

Alessio Di Chirico was expected to face Tom Breese at the event. However, Di Chirico pulled out of the fight in early January citing an undisclosed injury and subsequent surgery. On January 8, it was reported that The Ultimate Fighter: Brazil middleweight winner Cezar Ferreira would be his replacement. Ferreira and Breese were expected to meet at UFC Fight Night: Magny vs. Ponzinibbio in November 2018, but Breese pulled out due to injury. In turn, Ferreira withdrew from the bout on February 1, citing a knee injury. Breese was expected to face Ian Heinisch. However, the fight was cancelled on the day of the event due to undisclosed health issues for Breese.

Gökhan Saki was scheduled to face Saparbek Safarov at the event. However Saki pulled out of the fight in late February due to an undisclosed injury. He was replaced by promotional newcomer Nicolae Negumereanu.

At the weigh-ins, Jack Marshman weighed in at 188 lb, 2 pounds over the middleweight non-title fight limit of 186 lb. He was fined 20% of his fight purse and his bout against John Phillips proceeded at catchweight.

During the main card broadcast, the UFC announced that former UFC Middleweight Champion Michael Bisping (also The Ultimate Fighter 3 light heavyweight winner) will be inducted in the UFC's Hall of Fame during "International Fight Week" in July, a day before UFC 239.

=== Post-Fight Altercation ===
The event was marked by a brief backstage altercation between Jorge Masvidal and Leon Edwards as Masvidal was conducting a post-fight interview with ESPN reporter Laura Sanko. The altercation, broadcast by ESPN resulted in an open cut under the left eye of Edwards and received coverage under specialized media outlets. In posterior interviews, each of the fighters have diverging accounts of the events. Edwards declined to press charges. UFC President Dana White did not manifest sanctions to either of the fighters, however has blamed his own staff.

== Results ==
Main Card (ESPN+)
Weight class				Method	Round	Time	Notes
Welterweight	Jorge Masvidal	def.	Darren Till	KO (punches)	2	3:05
Welterweight	Leon Edwards	def.	Gunnar Nelson	Decision (split) (29–27, 29–28, 28–29)	3	5:00
Light Heavyweight	Dominick Reyes	def.	Volkan Oezdemir	Decision (split) (28–29, 29–28, 29–28)	3	5:00
Bantamweight	Nathaniel Wood	def.	José Quiñónez	Submission (rear-naked choke)	2	2:46
Welterweight	Cláudio Silva	def.	Danny Roberts	Submission (armbar)	3	2:37
Catchweight (188 lb)	Jack Marshman	def.	John Phillips	Decision (split) (28–29, 29–28, 29–28)	3	5:00
Preliminary Card (ESPN+)
Featherweight	Arnold Allen	def.	Jordan Rinaldi	Decision (unanimous) (30–26, 30–27, 29–28)	3	5:00
Lightweight	Marc Diakiese	def.	Joseph Duffy	Decision (unanimous) (30–27, 30–27, 30–27)	3	5:00
Light Heavyweight	Saparbek Safarov	def.	Nicolae Negumereanu	Decision (unanimous) (29–26, 29–26, 29–27)	3	5:00	(Note: Safarov was deducted a point in round 1 for continuously grabbing the cage.)
Featherweight	Dan Ige	def.	Danny Henry	Submission (rear-naked choke)	1	1:17
Women's Flyweight	Molly McCann	def.	Priscila Cachoeira	Decision (unanimous) (29–28, 29–28, 29–28)	3	5:00
Featherweight	Mike Grundy	def.	Nad Narimani	TKO (punches)	2	4:42

== Bonus awards ==
The following fighters received $50,000 bonuses:

- Fight of the Night: Jorge Masvidal vs. Darren Till
- Performance of the Night: Jorge Masvidal and Dan Ige

== See also ==
- List of UFC events
- 2019 in UFC
- List of current UFC fighters
