= 2019 in UFC =

Mixed martial arts events

Information
- First date: Jan 19, 2019
- Last date: Dec 21, 2019

Events
- Total events: 42 (1 cancelled)
- UFC: 12 (1 cancelled)
- TUF Finale events: 0

Fights
- Total fights: 517
- Title fights: 19

Chronology
2018 in UFC	2019 in UFC	2020 in UFC

The year 2019 was the 27th year in the history of the Ultimate Fighting Championship (UFC), a mixed martial arts promotion based in the United States.

== 2019 UFC Honors awards ==
Starting this year, the UFC created year-end awards with "UFC Honors President's Choice Awards" for categories "Performance of the Year" and "Fight of the Year" being chosen by UFC CEO Dana White. The other "UFC Honors Fan Choice Awards" are for categories "Knockout of the Year", "Submission of the Year", "Event of the Year", "Comeback of the Year" and, from 2020, "Debut of the Year" in which fans are able to vote for the winner on social media.

Winners receive a trophy commemorating their achievement along with a set of tires from sponsor Toyo Tires.

2019 UFC Honors Awards
	Performance of the Year	Fight of the Year	Knockout of the Year	Submission of the Year	Event of the Year	Comeback of the Year
Winner	Jorge Masvidal defeats Ben Askren; UFC 239	Israel Adesanya defeats Kelvin Gastelum; UFC 236	Jorge Masvidal defeats Ben Askren; UFC 239	Bryce Mitchell defeats Matt Sayles; UFC on ESPN: Overeem vs. Rozenstruik	UFC 241: Cormier vs. Miocic 2	Stipe Miocic defeats Daniel Cormier 2 UFC 241
Nominee	Bryce Mitchell defeats Matt Sayles; UFC on ESPN: Overeem vs. Rozenstruik	Henry Cejudo defeats Marlon Moraes; UFC 238	Niko Price defeats James Vick; UFC Fight Night: Joanna vs. Waterson	Khabib Nurmagomedov defeats Dustin Poirier; UFC 242	UFC 236: Holloway vs. Poirier 2	Jéssica Andrade defeats Rose Namajunas; UFC 251
Nominee	Israel Adesanya defeats Robert Whittaker 1 UFC 243	Paulo Costa defeats Yoel Romero; UFC 231	Valentina Shevchenko defeats Jessica Eye; UFC 238	Demian Maia defeats Ben Askren; UFC Fight Night: Maia vs. Askren	UFC 239: Jones vs. Santos	Henry Cejudo defeats Marlon Moraes; UFC 238
Nominee	Henry Cejudo defeats Marlon Moraes; UFC 238	Justin Gaethje defeats Edson Barboza; UFC on ESPN: Barboza vs. Gaethje	Aleksandar Rakić defeats Jimi Manuwa; UFC Fight Night: Gustafsson vs. Smith	Marlon Moraes defeats Raphael Assunção 2 UFC Fight Night: Assunção vs. Moraes 2	UFC Fight Night: Andrade vs. Zhang	Anthony Pettis defeats Stephen Thompson; UFC Fight Night: Thompson vs. Pettis
Nominee	Zhang Weili defeats Jéssica Andrade; UFC Fight Night: Andrade vs. Zhang	Dustin Poirier defeats Max Holloway 2 UFC 236	—N/a	—N/a	—N/a	—N/a
Ref						

== 2019 UFC.com awards ==
2019 UFC.COM Awards
No	Best Fighter	The Upsets	The Submissions	The Newcomers	The Knockouts	The Fights
1	Zhang Weili; Top 10 (No ranking order this year)	Khama Worthy defeats Devonte Smith; UFC 241	Bryce Mitchell defeats Matt Sayles; UFC on ESPN: Overeem vs. Rozenstruik	Jairzinho Rozenstruik	Jorge Masvidal defeats Ben Askren; UFC 239	Israel Adesanya defeats Kelvin Gastelum; UFC 236
2	Petr Yan; Top 10 (No ranking order this year)	Tristan Connelly defeats Michel Pereira; UFC Fight Night: Cowboy vs. Gaethje	Khabib Nurmagomedov defeats Dustin Poirier; UFC 242	Ciryl Gane	Valentina Shevchenko defeats Jessica Eye; UFC 238	Kamaru Usman defeats Colby Covington 1 UFC 245
3	Alexander Volkanovski; Top 10 (No ranking order this year)	Henry Cejudo defeats T.J. Dillashaw; UFC Fight Night: Cejudo vs. Dillashaw	Demian Maia defeats Ben Askren; UFC Fight Night: Maia vs. Askren	Amanda Ribas	Aleksandar Rakić defeats Jimi Manuwa; UFC Fight Night: Gustafsson vs. Smith	Paulo Costa defeats Yoel Romero; UFC 231
4	Kamaru Usman; Top 10 (No ranking order this year)	Roxanne Modafferi defeats Antonina Shevchenko; UFC Fight Night: Overeem vs. Oleinik	Marlon Moraes defeats Raphael Assunção 2 UFC Fight Night: Assunção vs. Moraes 2	Grant Dawson	Niko Price defeats James Vick; UFC Fight Night: Joanna vs. Waterson	Dustin Poirier defeats Max Holloway 2 UFC 236
5	Valentina Shevchenko; Top 10 (No ranking order this year)	Pedro Munhoz defeats Cody Garbrandt; UFC 235	Ovince Saint Preux defeats Michał Oleksiejczuk; UFC Fight Night: Hermansson vs. Cannonier	Kron Gracie	Kevin Lee defeats Gregor Gillespie; UFC 244	Vicente Luque defeats Bryan Barberena; UFC on ESPN: Ngannou vs. Velasquez
6	Jorge Masvidal; Top 10 (No ranking order this year)	Jéssica Andrade defeats Rose Namajunas; UFC 251	Cory Sandhagen defeats Mario Bautista; UFC Fight Night: Cejudo vs. Dillashaw	Ismail Naurdiev	Jorge Masvidal defeats Darren Till; UFC Fight Night: Till vs. Masvidal	Henry Cejudo defeats Marlon Moraes; UFC 238
7	Demian Maia; Top 10 (No ranking order this year)	Ismail Naurdiev defeats Michel Prazeres; UFC Fight Night: Błachowicz vs. Santos	Paul Craig defeats Kennedy Nzechukwu; UFC on ESPN: Barboza vs. Gaethje	Makhmud Muradov	Anthony Pettis defeats Stephen Thompson; UFC Fight Night: Thompson vs. Pettis	Justin Gaethje defeats Edson Barboza; UFC on ESPN: Barboza vs. Gaethje
8	Justin Gaethje; Top 10 (No ranking order this year)	Kamaru Usman defeats Tyron Woodley; UFC 235	Misha Cirkunov defeats Jimmy Crute; UFC Fight Night: Cowboy vs. Gaethje	Casey Kenney	Jéssica Andrade defeats Rose Namajunas; UFC 251	Pedro Munhoz defeats Cody Garbrandt; UFC 235
9	Henry Cejudo; Top 10 (No ranking order this year)	Anthony Pettis defeats Stephen Thompson; UFC Fight Night: Thompson vs. Pettis	Charles Oliveira defeats David Teymur; UFC Fight Night: Assunção vs. Moraes 2	Greg Hardy	Jan Błachowicz defeats Luke Rockhold; UFC 239	Tony Ferguson defeats Donald Cerrone; UFC 238
10	Israel Adesanya; Top 10 (No ranking order this year)	Jan Błachowicz defeats Luke Rockhold; UFC 239	David Zawada defeats Abubakar Nurmagomedov; UFC Fight Night: Magomedsharipov vs. Kattar	Viviane Araújo	Josh Emmett defeats Michael Johnson; UFC on ESPN: Barboza vs. Gaethje	Yair Rodríguez defeats Jeremy Stephens 2 UFC on ESPN: Reyes vs. Weidman
Ref						

== 2019 by the numbers ==
The numbers below records the events, fights, techniques, champions and fighters held or performed for the year of 2019 in UFC.

Events
Number of Events	PPV	Continents	Countries	Cities	Fight Night Bonuses
42	11	5	15	39	168; Total $8,400,000
Longest Event	Shortest Event	Highest Income Live Gate	Lowest Income Live Gate	Highest Attendance	Lowest Attendance
UFC Fight Night: Joanna vs. Waterson 2:57:27	UFC on ESPN: Ngannou vs. dos Santos 1:38:12	UFC 244 $6,575,996.19	UFC Fight Night: Lewis vs. dos Santos $636,417.26	UFC 243 57,127	UFC Fight Night: Maia vs. Askren 7,155
Title Fights
Undisputed Title Fights	Title Changes	Champions Remained in Their Divisions	Number of Champions	Number of Interim Champions	Number of Title Defenses
17	6	4 LW – Khabib Nurmagomedov; WFYW – Valentina Shevchenko; WBW – Amanda Nunes; WFW – Amanda Nunes	13	2	11
Champions
Division	Beginning of The Year	End of The Year	Division	Beginning of The Year	End of The Year
Heavyweight	Daniel Cormier	Stipe Miocic	Bantamweight	T.J. Dillashaw	Henry Cejudo
Light Heavyweight	Jon Jones	Jon Jones	Flyweight	Henry Cejudo	Vacant
Middleweight	Robert Whittaker	Israel Adesanya	Women's Bantamweight	Amanda Nunes	Amanda Nunes
Welterweight	Tyron Woodley	Kamaru Usman	Women's Flyweight	Valentina Shevchenko	Valentina Shevchenko
Lightweight	Khabib Nurmagomedov	Khabib Nurmagomedov	Women's Strawweight	Rose Namajunas	Zhang Weili
Featherweight	Max Holloway	Alexander Volkanovski	Women's Featherweight	Amanda Nunes	Amanda Nunes
Fights
Most Knockouts at A Single Event	Most submissions at A Single Event	Most Decisions at A Single Event	Total Number of Fights	Total Number of Cage Time	
UFC on ESPN: Ngannou vs. dos Santos; UFC 244; UFC 245 7	UFC on ESPN: Covington vs. Lawler 5	UFC on ESPN: dos Anjos vs. Edwards 10	516	94:59:04	
Fighters
Number of Fighters	UFC Debutants	Releases / Retired	Fighters Suspended	Number of Fighters Missed weight	
(At the end of Dec 31, 2019); 590	135	106	25	30	
Champion feats
Kamaru Usman outlanded Tyron Woodley by 275 total strikes, setting a new record in a title fight.; Jon Jones outlanded Anthony Smith by 193 total strikes, setting a new record in a light heavyweight title fight.; Israel Adesanya set a new record after landing four knockdowns in a title fight.; Zhang Weili became the first Chinese-born UFC champion.; Alexander Volkanovski became the first Australian-born UFC champion.
Fighter feats
Emily Whitmire's 61 second submission set a new record for the fastest in women's strawweight history.; Kamaru Usman's 192 body strikes set a new record for the most in company history.; Khalil Rountree Jr.'s 4 knockdowns set a new record for the most in a light heavyweight bout.; Michał Oleksiejczuk set a new record at UFC Fight Night 149 by scoring three knockdowns in just 44 seconds, the most ever recorded in such a short span of a bout.; Jairzinho Rozenstruik's 9 second knockout at UFC Fight Night 154 is the second fastest finish and knockout in heavyweight history (behind Todd Duffee); Ashley Yoder was the first woman to score a 30–24 card with her victory at UFC Fight Night 154.; Diego Sanchez was the first fighter to have 20 decision bouts in the UFC.; Jorge Masvidal's five second knockout at UFC 239 set the new record for the fastest knockout and finish in UFC history.; Colby Covington set a new UFC record by attempting 515 significant strikes in a single fight, a mark later surpassed by Max Holloway with 744 attempts in 2021.; Ovince Saint Preux extended his UFC record for most Von Flue Choke submission victories by securing his fourth.; Megan Anderson became the first in the women's featherweight division to win via a triangle-choke submission.; Demian Maia extended his UFC record for rear‑naked choke submission victories by securing his ninth.; Matt Brown's 13th knockout extended the record for most in welterweight history.

== Releases and retirements ==
These fighters have either been released from their UFC contracts, announced their retirement or joined other promotions.

Month	Day	ISO	Fighter	Division	Reason	Ref
January	1	(Philippines)	Rolando Dy	Featherweight	Released	
January	8	(United States)	Matt Bessette	Featherweight	Released	
January	10	(United States)	Jason Knight	Featherweight	Released	
January	10	(United States)	Craig White	Welterweight	Released	
January	11	(Japan)	Naoki Inoue	Flyweight	Released	
January	19	(United States)	Dennis Bermudez	Lightweight	Retired	
January	21	(Brazil)	Juliana Lima	Women's Strawweight	Signed with Invicta FC	
January	25	(United States)	Joby Sanchez	Flyweight	Released	
January	29	(Russia)	Artem Lobov	Featherweight	Released	
February	2	(Brazil)	Matheus Nicolau	Flyweight	Released	
February	7	(United States)	John Moraga	Flyweight	Released	
February	8	(United States)	Justin Frazier	Heavyweight	Released	
February	13	(United States)	Dustin Ortiz	Flyweight	Released	
February	19	(United States)	Terrion Ware	Bantamweight	Released	
February	19	(Japan)	Yushin Okami	Middleweight	Signed with ONE	
February	21	(Canada)	Georges St-Pierre	Middleweight	Retired	
February	N/A	(United States)	Rashad Coulter	Light Heavyweight	Released	
March	7	(South Korea)	Chan-Mi Jeon	Women's Strawweight	Released	
March	9	(Mexico)	Álvaro Herrera	Lightweight	Released	
March	21	(United States)	Jordan Johnson	Middleweight	Signed with PFL	
April	1	(Russia)	Ruslan Magomedov	Heavyweight	Released	
April	9	(England)	Ross Pearson	Lightweight	Retired	
April	13	(Brazil)	Wilson Reis	Flyweight	Released	
April	18	(Peru)	Jesus Pinedo	Lightweight	Released	
April	20	(Russia)	Sultan Aliev	Welterweight	Retired	
April	21	(United States)	Josh Burkman	Welterweight	Released	
May	4	(Croatia)	Igor Pokrajac	Light Heavyweight	Released	
May	7	(Brazil)	Felipe Silva	Lightweight	Released	
May	12	(France)	Tom Duquesnoy	Bantamweight	Retired	
May	16	(United States)	Jordan Rinaldi	Featherweight	Released	
May	16	(United States)	Jessica Aguilar	Women's Strawweight	Released	
May	21	(United States)	Abel Trujillo	Lightweight	Released	
May	24	(United States)	Justin Willis	Heavyweight	Released	
May	25	(United States)	Bryan Caraway	Bantamweight	Released	
May	26	(Canada)	Elias Theodorou	Middleweight	Released	
May	26	(United States)	Eric Shelton	Flyweight	Released	
May	26	(Brazil)	Marcelo Golm	Heavyweight	Released	
May	28	(Russia)	Abdul-Kerim Edilov	Light Heavyweight	Released	
May	28	(United States)	Joseph Morales	Flyweight	Released	
May	30	(Australia)	Ashkan Mokhtarian	Flyweight	Released	
May	31	(Australia)	Alex Gorgees	Lightweight	Released	
June	2	(Germany)	Nick Hein	Lightweight	Retired	
June	4	(England)	Jimi Manuwa	Light Heavyweight	Retired	
June	19	(United States)	Andrew Holbrook	Lightweight	Released	
July	3	(India)	Arjan Bhullar	Heavyweight	Signed with ONE	
July	3	(Brazil)	John Lineker	Bantamweight	Released	
July	7	(United States)	Austin Arnett	Featherweight	Released	
July	9	(Russia)	Ivan Shtyrkov	Heavyweight	Released	
July	17	(United States)	Amanda Cooper	Women's Strawweight	Signed with Invicta FC	
July	18	(United States)	Myles Jury	Featherweight	Signed with Bellator MMA	
July	19	(Japan)	Shinsho Anzai	Welterweight	Released	
August	1	(Brazil)	Antonio Trocoli	Heavyweight	Released	
August	3	(Brazil)	Cris Cyborg	Women's Featherweight	Released	
August	5	(Italy)	Carlo Pedersoli Jr.	Welterweight	Released	
August	14	(United States)	Cat Zingano	Women's Bantamweight	Released	
August	17	(United States)	Jonathan Wilson	Middleweight	Released	
August	24	(South Korea)	Jo Sung-Bin	Featherweight	Released	
August	25	(Guam)	Jon Tuck	Lightweight	Released	
September	5	(United States)	B.J. Penn	Lightweight	Released	
September	6	(United States)	Tim Boetsch	Middleweight	Retired	
September	10	(Russia)	Dmitry Smolyakov	Heavyweight	Released	
September	14	(Japan)	Keita Nakamura	Welterweight	Released	
September	19	(United States)	Alex Garcia	Welterweight	Released	
September	19	(United States)	David Branch	Middleweight	Released	
September	17	(Brazil)	Sarah Frota	Women's Flyweight	Released	
September	30	(United States)	Ryan MacDonald	Bantamweight	Released	
October	3	(United States)	Sergio Pettis	Flyweight	Signed with Bellator MMA	
October	3	(Brazil)	Sheymon Moraes	Featherweight	Released	
October	11	(United States)	Cain Velasquez	Heavyweight	Retired	
October	18	(Peru)	Humberto Bandenay	Featherweight	Released	
October	29	(Russia)	Azamat Murzakanov	Light Heavyweight	Released	
October	N/A	(United States)	Julian Erosa	Featherweight	Released	
November	1	(Japan)	Yoshinori Horie	Featherweight	Released	
November	2	(United States)	Bobby Moffett	Featherweight	Released	
November	5	(United States)	Thomas Gifford	Lightweight	Released	
November	6	(United States)	Curtis Millender	Welterweight	Released	
November	6	(United States)	Andre Soukhamthath	Bantamweight	Released	
November	6	(Italy)	Danilo Belluardo	Lightweight	Released	
November	6	(United States)	Derrick Krantz	Welterweight	Released	
November	6	(Mexico)	Henry Briones	Bantamweight	Released	
November	6	(United States)	Kyle Stewart	Welterweight	Released	
November	6	(United States)	Maia Stevenson	Women's Strawweight	Released	
November	6	(United States)	Nohelin Hernandez	Bantamweight	Released	
November	11	(United States)	Gilbert Melendez	Featherweight	Released	
November	17	(United States)	Dan Moret	Lightweight	Released	
November	18	(United States)	Ben Askren	Welterweight	Retired	
November	21	(United States)	Allen Crowder	Heavyweight	Retired	
November	25	(Brazil)	Sérgio Moraes	Welterweight	Released	
November	26	(Belgium)	Tarec Saffiedine	Welterweight	Released	
November	29	(United States)	Gray Maynard	Lightweight	Released	
December	4	(United States)	C. B. Dollaway	Middleweight	Released	
December	6	(United States)	Liz Carmouche	Women's Flyweight	Released	
December	6	(Brazil)	Renan Barão	Featherweight	Released	
December	19	(United States)	Allan Zuniga	Lightweight	Released	
December	19	(United States)	Lauren Mueller	Women's Flyweight	Released	
December	19	(United States)	Darrell Horcher	Lightweight	Released	
December	19	(United States)	Jason Gonzalez	Lightweight	Released	
December	19	(United States)	Kurt Holobaugh	Lightweight	Released	
December	19	(United States)	Te Edwards	Lightweight	Released	
December	19	(United States)	Zak Ottow	Welterweight	Released	
December	19	(Sweden)	Rostem Akman	Welterweight	Released	
December	24	(United States)	Patrick Cummins	Light Heavyweight	Retired	

== Debut UFC fighters ==
Month	Day	ISO	Fighter	Division	Event
January	19	(Brazil)	Ariane Lipski	Women's Flyweight	UFC Fight Night 143
January	19	(United States)	Greg Hardy	Heavyweight	UFC Fight Night 143
January	19	(United States)	Mario Bautista	Bantamweight	UFC Fight Night 143
January	19	(Brazil)	Vinicius Moreira	Light Heavyweight	UFC Fight Night 143
January	19	(United States)	Kyle Stewart	Lightweight	UFC Fight Night 143
February	2	(United States)	Anthony Hernandez	Middleweight	UFC Fight Night 144
February	2	(Brazil)	Felipe Colares	Bantamweight	UFC Fight Night 144
February	2	(Brazil)	Geraldo de Freitas	Bantamweight	UFC Fight Night 144
February	2	(Suriname)	Jairzinho Rozenstruik	Heavyweight	UFC Fight Night 144
February	2	(Brazil)	Rogério Bontorin	Flyweight	UFC Fight Night 144
February	2	(Brazil)	Taila Santos	Women's Flyweight	UFC Fight Night 144
February	10	(Australia)	Callan Potter	Lightweight	UFC 234
February	10	(Brazil)	Marcos Rosa Mariano	Lightweight	UFC 234
February	10	(Brazil)	Raulian Paiva	Flyweight	UFC 234
February	23	(Austria)	Ismail Naurdiev	Welterweight	UFC Fight Night 145
February	23	(Spain)	Joel Álvarez	Lightweight	UFC Fight Night 145
February	23	(Brazil)	Klidson Abreu	Light Heavyweight	UFC Fight Night 145
March	2	(United States)	Ben Askren	Welterweight	UFC 235
March	9	(United States)	Grant Dawson	Featherweight	UFC Fight Night 146
March	9	(United States)	Jeff Hughes	Heavyweight	UFC Fight Night 146
March	16	(England)	Mike Grundy	Featherweight	UFC Fight Night 147
March	16	(Romania)	Nicolae Negumereanu	Light Heavyweight	UFC Fight Night 147
March	23	(United States)	Jordan Espinosa	Flyweight	UFC Fight Night 148
March	23	(United States)	Ryan MacDonald	Bantamweight	UFC Fight Night 148
March	30	(United States)	Casey Kenney	Bantamweight	UFC on ESPN 2
March	30	(Nigeria)	Kennedy Nzechukwu	Light Heavyweight	UFC on ESPN 2
March	30	(Colombia)	Sabina Mazo	Women's Flyweight	UFC on ESPN 2
April	13	(United States)	Boston Salmon	Bantamweight	UFC 236
April	13	(United States)	Randy Costa	Bantamweight	UFC 236
April	13	(Russia)	Zelim Imadaev	Welterweight	UFC 236
April	20	(North Macedonia)	Alen Amedovski	Middleweight	UFC Fight Night 149
April	20	(Brazil)	Alex da Silva Coelho	Lightweight	UFC Fight Night 149
April	20	(Armenia)	Arman Tsarukyan	Lightweight	UFC Fight Night 149
April	20	(Russia)	Movsar Evloev	Featherweight	UFC Fight Night 149
April	20	(Kazakhstan)	Rafael Fiziev	Lightweight	UFC Fight Night 149
April	20	(South Korea)	Seung Woo Choi	Featherweight	UFC Fight Night 149
April	27	(United States)	Mike Davis	Lightweight	UFC Fight Night 150
April	27	(Japan)	Takashi Sato	Welterweight	UFC Fight Night 150
April	27	(United States)	Thomas Gifford	Lightweight	UFC Fight Night 150
April	27	(Brazil)	Virna Jandiroba	Women's Strawweight	UFC Fight Night 150
May	4	(Canada)	Cole Smith	Bantamweight	UFC Fight Night 151
May	4	(Canada)	Kyle Prepolec	Lightweight	UFC Fight Night 151
May	4	(Canada)	Marc-André Barriault	Middleweight	UFC Fight Night 151
May	4	(Moldova)	Serghei Spivac	Heavyweight	UFC Fight Night 151
May	11	(Peru)	Carlos Huachin	Bantamweight	UFC 237
May	11	(Brazil)	Luana Carolina	Women's Flyweight	UFC 237
May	11	(Brazil)	Viviane Araújo	Women's Flyweight	UFC 237
May	18	(United States)	Austin Hubbard	Lightweight	UFC Fight Night 152
May	18	(Canada)	Charles Jourdain	Featherweight	UFC Fight Night 152
May	18	(United States)	Derrick Krantz	Welterweight	UFC Fight Night 152
May	18	(Canada)	Felicia Spencer	Women's Featherweight	UFC Fight Night 152
May	18	(Brazil)	Michel Pereira	Welterweight	UFC Fight Night 152
June	1	(Sweden)	Bea Malecki	Women's Bantamweight	UFC Fight Night 153
June	1	(Italy)	Danilo Belluardo	Lightweight	UFC Fight Night 153
June	1	(Brazil)	Duda Santana	Women's Bantamweight	UFC Fight Night 153
June	1	(Russia)	Sergey Khandozhko	Welterweight	UFC Fight Night 153
June	1	(South Korea)	Sung Bin Jo	Featherweight	UFC Fight Night 153
June	1	(Sweden)	Rostem Akman	Welterweight	UFC Fight Night 153
June	8	(Russia)	Grigory Popov	Bantamweight	UFC 238
June	22	(United States)	Deron Winn	Middleweight	UFC Fight Night 154
June	29	(Brazil)	Amanda Ribas	Women's Strawweight	UFC on ESPN 3
June	29	(Democratic Republic of the Congo)	Dalcha Lungiambula	Light Heavyweight	UFC on ESPN 3
June	29	(United States)	Dequan Townsend	Middleweight	UFC on ESPN 3
June	29	(United States)	Journey Newson	Bantamweight	UFC on ESPN 3
July	6	(United States)	Julia Avila	Women's Bantamweight	UFC 239
July	6	(United States)	Nohelin Hernandez	Bantamweight	UFC 239
July	13	(United States)	Brianna Van Buren	Women's Strawweight	UFC Fight Night 155
July	13	(Brazil)	John Allan	Light Heavyweight	UFC Fight Night 155
July	13	(Brazil)	Wellington Turman	Middleweight	UFC Fight Night 155
July	20	(United States)	Domingo Pilarte	Bantamweight	UFC on ESPN 4
July	20	(Brazil)	Gabriel Silva	Bantamweight	UFC on ESPN 4
July	27	(Japan)	Yoshinori Horie	Featherweight	UFC 240
August	3	(United States)	Hannah Goldy	Women's Strawweight	UFC on ESPN 5
August	3	(United States)	Cole Williams	Welterweight	UFC on ESPN 5
August	3	(United States)	Miranda Granger	Women's Strawweight	UFC on ESPN 5
August	10	(France)	Ciryl Gane	Heavyweight	UFC Fight Night 156
August	10	(Uruguay)	Luiz Eduardo Garagorri	Featherweight	UFC Fight Night 156
August	10	(Brazil)	Raphael Pessoa	Heavyweight	UFC Fight Night 156
August	10	(Brazil)	Rodolfo Vieira	Middleweight	UFC Fight Night 156
August	10	(Mexico)	Rodrigo Vargas	Lightweight	UFC Fight Night 156
August	17	(United States)	Khama Worthy	Lightweight	UFC 241
August	31	(South Korea)	Da Woon Jung	Light Heavyweight	UFC Fight Night 157
August	31	(Mongolia)	Danaa Batgerel	Bantamweight	UFC Fight Night 157
August	31	(South Korea)	Jun Yong Park	Middleweight	UFC Fight Night 157
August	31	(Russia)	Khadis Ibragimov	Light Heavyweight	UFC Fight Night 157
August	31	(Brazil)	Karol Rosa	Women's Bantamweight	UFC Fight Night 157
August	31	(Brazil)	Lara Procópio	Women's Flyweight	UFC Fight Night 157
August	31	(Japan)	Mizuki Inoue	Women's Strawweight	UFC Fight Night 157
September	7	(France)	Fares Ziam	Lightweight	UFC 242
September	7	(England)	Lerone Murphy	Featherweight	UFC 242
September	7	(Georgia (country))	Liana Jojua	Women's Flyweight	UFC 242
September	7	(Morocco)	Ottman Azaitar	Lightweight	UFC 242
September	14	(United States)	Hunter Azure	Bantamweight	UFC Fight Night 158
September	14	(United States)	Miles Johns	Bantamweight	UFC Fight Night 158
September	14	(Canada)	Tristan Connelly	Welterweight	UFC Fight Night 158
September	21	(Brazil)	Ariane Carnelossi	Women's Strawweight	UFC Fight Night 159
September	21	(Russia)	Askar Askarov	Flyweight	UFC Fight Night 159
September	21	(United States)	Tyson Nam	Flyweight	UFC Fight Night 159
September	21	(Brazil)	Vanessa Melo	Women's Bantamweight	UFC Fight Night 159
September	28	(Georgia (country))	Giga Chikadze	Featherweight	UFC Fight Night 160
September	28	(Wales)	Jack Shore	Bantamweight	UFC Fight Night 160
September	28	(Uzbekistan)	Makhmud Muradov	Middleweight	UFC Fight Night 160
September	28	(Denmark)	Mark Madsen	Lightweight	UFC Fight Night 160
October	6	(New Zealand)	Brad Riddell	Lightweight	UFC 243
October	6	(Brazil)	Bruno Gustavo da Silva	Bantamweight	UFC 243
October	6	(Australia)	Jamie Mullarkey	Lightweight	UFC 243
October	6	(Australia)	Justin Tafa	Heavyweight	UFC 243
October	6	(United States)	Maki Pitolo	Middleweight	UFC 243
October	6	(Cape Verde)	Yorgan De Castro	Heavyweight	UFC 243
October	6	(France)	Zarah Fairn	Women's Featherweight	UFC 243
October	12	(United States)	Miguel Baeza	Welterweight	UFC Fight Night 161
October	18	(United States)	Ben Sosoli	Heavyweight	UFC on ESPN 6
October	18	(United States)	Brendan Allen	Middleweight	UFC on ESPN 6
October	18	(Romania)	Diana Belbiţă	Women's Flyweight	UFC on ESPN 6
October	18	(United States)	Jonathan Pearce	Featherweight	UFC on ESPN 6
October	18	(United States)	Sean Brady	Welterweight	UFC on ESPN 6
October	18	(United States)	Sean Woodson	Featherweight	UFC on ESPN 6
October	18	(Canada)	Tanner Boser	Heavyweight	UFC on ESPN 6
October	26	(United States)	Don'Tale Mayes	Heavyweight	UFC Fight Night 162
October	26	(Thailand)	Loma Lookboonmee	Women's Strawweight	UFC Fight Night 162
November	9	(Russia)	Abubakar Nurmagomedov	Welterweight	UFC Fight Night 163
November	9	(Russia)	Roman Kopylov	Middleweight	UFC Fight Night 163
November	9	(Russia)	Shamil Gamzatov	Light Heavyweight	UFC Fight Night 163
November	16	(Brazil)	André Muniz	Middleweight	UFC Fight Night 164
November	16	(Brazil)	Antônio Arroyo	Middleweight	UFC Fight Night 164
November	16	(Brazil)	Isabella de Padua	Women's Flyweight	UFC Fight Night 164
November	16	(United States)	Tracy Cortez	Women's Flyweight	UFC Fight Night 164
December	7	(United States)	Billy Quarantillo	Featherweight	UFC on ESPN 7
December	7	(United States)	Jacob Kilburn	Featherweight	UFC on ESPN 7
December	7	(United States)	Joe Solecki	Lightweight	UFC on ESPN 7
December	7	(United States)	Mallory Martin	Women's Strawweight	UFC on ESPN 7
December	14	(United States)	Chase Hooper	Featherweight	UFC 245
December	14	(United States)	Punahele Soriano	Middleweight	UFC 245
December	21	(Venezuela)	Omar Morales	Lightweight	UFC Fight Night 165

== Suspended fighters ==
ISO	Name	Nickname	Division	From	Duration	Tested positive for / Info	By	Eligible to fight again	Ref.	Notes
Russian Federation	Azamat Murzakanov	The Profession	Light Heavyweight	September 2, 2017	2 years	Boldenone metabolites, specifically 5β-androst-1-en-17β-ol-3-one and androsta-1,4-diene-6β-ol-3,17-dione in an out-of-competition test submitted on September 2, 2017.	USADA	September 2, 2019		Released
United States	C. B. Dollaway	The Doberman	Middleweight	December 13, 2018	2 years	Anastrozole, clomiphene and receiving intravenous (IV) infusion over the allowable limit.	USADA	December 13, 2020		Released
United States	T.J. Dillashaw		Bantamweight	January 18, 2019	1 year (NYSAC); 2 years (USADA)	Erythropoietin (EPO).	NYSAC and USADA	January 18, 2021		
Brazil	Michel Prazeres		Welterweight	March 9, 2019	2 years	Exogenous boldenone and its metabolite 5β-androst-1-en-17β-ol-3-one.	USADA	March 9, 2021		
China	Hu Yaozong	Totoro	Light Heavyweight	March 9, 2019	Initially 1 year but reduced to 10 months	Arimistane and its metabolite from contamination supplement.	USADA	January 9, 2020		Original suspension was 1 year but reduced to 10 months
Georgia	Roman Dolidze	Bazooka	Light Heavyweight	March 12, 2019	1 year	Clomiphene hormone and its metabolites M1 and M2, as well as 4-chloro-18-nor-17β-hydroxymethyl,17α-methyl-5α-androst-13-en-3α-ol (M3), which is a long-term metabolite of dehydrochlormethyltestosterone (DHCMT).	USADA	March 12, 2020		
Russian Federation	Ivan Shtyrkov	Ural Hulk	Heavyweight	March 27, 2019	2 years	Boldenone and its metabolite 5β-androst-1-en-17β-ol-3-one.	USADA	March 27, 2021		Released
United States	Jessica Penne		Women's Flyweight	April 8, 2019	Initially 4 years but reduced to 20 months	Stanozolol metabolites 16β-hydroxystanozolol and 3′-hydroxystanozolol.	USADA	December 8, 2020		Original suspension was 4 years after second violation, but reduced to 20 months in February 2020
North Macedonia	Alen Amedovski		Middleweight	April 20, 2019	Initially 6 months but reduced to 3 months	Carboxy-THC, a cannabis metabolite.	USADA	July 20, 2019		Original suspension was 6 months, but reduced to 3 months after Alen's successful completion of a drug treatment program.
France	Thibault Gouti	GT	Lightweight	April 25, 2019	6 months	Ostarine and its metabolite di-hydroxy-LGD-4033. GW1516 metabolites GW1516 sulfoxide and GW1516 sulfone.	USADA	October 25, 2019		
Russian Federation	Dmitry Smolyakov	The Lifeguard	Heavyweight	April 27, 2019	2 years	Recombinant human erythropoietin (rHuEPO) and intact human chorionic gonadotropin (hCG).	USADA	April 27, 2021		Released
Brazil	Melissa Gatto		Women's Bantamweight	June 5, 2019	1 year	Furosemide, a diuretic.	USADA	June 5, 2020		
United States	Dequan Townsend		Middleweight	June 28, 2019	6 months	Benzoylecgonine (cocaine) and norfentanyl (fentanyl).	USADA	December 28, 2019		
United States	Vince Murdock		Featherweight	July 6, 2019	20 months	GW1516, a hormone modulator that is better known as cardarine. It is often sold on the black market as endurobol.	USADA	March 6, 2021		
Brazil	Giacomo Lemos		Heavyweight	July 9, 2019	2 years	Drostanolone and its metabolite 2α-methyl-5α-androstan-3α-ol-17-one.	USADA	July 9, 2021		
Brazil	John Allan		Light Heavyweight	July 13, 2019	1 year	Tamoxifen.	USADA and CSAC	July 13, 2020		Fined $4,800 by the CSAC
Brazil	Sarah Frota	A Treta	Flyweight	July 21, 2019	2 years	Multiple stanozolol metabolites, including 16α-hydroxystanozolol, 3, 16-dihydroxystanozolol and 4β,16-dihydroxystanozolol on the day of UFC 240.	USADA and the Edmonton Combative Sports Commission	July 21, 2021		Released
Brazil	Istela Nunes		Women's Strawweight	July 22, 2019	2 years	Stanozolol metabolites 16β-hydroxystanozolol and 3′-hydroxystanozolol.	USADA	July 22, 2021		
United States	David Branch	The Executive	Middleweight	July 26, 2019	2 years	Ipamorelin, class of peptide hormones and growth factors.	USADA	July 26, 2021		Released
United States	Sean O'Malley	Sugar	Bantamweight	August 6, 2019	6 months	Ostarine.	USADA	February 6, 2020		
United States	Aspen Ladd	Totoro	Women's Bantamweight	August 8, 2019		Ladd's bantamweight license after gaining 18 percent of her weight between weigh-ins and fight day against Germaine de Randamie at UFC Fight Night 155.	CSAC	Until “Extensive medical documentation" is presented to the CSAC to clear suspension.		
Germany	Khalid Taha	The Warrior	Bantamweight	October 6, 2019	1 year	Furosemide (diuretics).	USADA	October 6, 2020		
Brazil	Priscila Cachoeira		Women's Flyweight	October 12, 2019	4 months	A diuretic, hydrochlorothiazide (HCTZ) and its metabolites chlorothiazide and 4amino-6chloro-1,3-benzenedisulfonamide (ACB).	USADA	February 12, 2020		
United States	Ovince Saint Preux	OSP	Light Heavyweight	October 25, 2019	3 months	Ostarine and S-23, the family of selective androgen receptor modulators (SARMs).	USADA	January 25, 2020		Ostarine came from a tainted supplement
United States	Diego Sanchez	Nightmare	Welterweight	October 26, 2019	3 months	Ostarine and S-23, the family of selective androgen receptor modulators (SARMs).	USADA	January 26, 2020		Ostarine came from a tainted supplement

== Title fights ==
Title fights in 2019
Weight class				Method	Round	Time	Event	Notes
Flyweight	Henry Cejudo (c)	def.	T.J. Dillashaw	TKO (punches)	1	0:32	UFC Fight Night 143	(Note: For the UFC Flyweight Championship.)
Welterweight	Kamaru Usman	def.	Tyron Woodley (c)	Decision (unanimous) (50–44, 50–44, 50–45)	5	5:00	UFC 235	(Note: For the UFC Welterweight Championship.)
Light Heavyweight	Jon Jones (c)	def.	Anthony Smith	Decision (unanimous) (48–44, 48–44, 48–44)	5	5:00	UFC 235	(Note: For the UFC Light Heavyweight Championship.)
Middleweight	Israel Adesanya	def.	Kelvin Gastelum	Decision (unanimous) (48–46, 48–46, 48–46)	5	5:00	UFC 236	(Note: For the interim UFC Middleweight Championship.)
Lightweight	Dustin Poirier	def.	Max Holloway	Decision (unanimous) (49–46, 49–46, 49–46)	5	5:00	UFC 236	(Note: For the interim UFC Lightweight Championship.)
Women's Strawweight	Jéssica Andrade	def.	Rose Namajunas (c)	TKO (slam)	2	2:58	UFC 237	(Note: For the UFC Women's Strawweight Championship.)
Women's Flyweight	Valentina Shevchenko (c)	def.	Jessica Eye	KO (head kick)	2	0:26	UFC 238	(Note: For the UFC Women's Flyweight Championship.)
Bantamweight	Henry Cejudo	def.	Marlon Moraes	TKO (punches)	3	4:51	UFC 238	(Note: For the vacant UFC Bantamweight Championship.)
Women's Bantamweight	Amanda Nunes (c)	def.	Holly Holm	TKO (head kick and punches)	1	4:10	UFC 239	(Note: For the UFC Women's Bantamweight Championship.)
Light Heavyweight	Jon Jones (c)	def.	Thiago Santos	Decision (split) (48–47, 48–47, 47–48)	5	5:00	UFC 239	(Note: For the UFC Light Heavyweight Championship.)
Featherweight	Max Holloway (c)	def.	Frankie Edgar	Decision (unanimous) (50–45, 50–45, 48–47)	5	5:00	UFC 240	(Note: For the UFC Featherweight Championship.)
Women's Flyweight	Valentina Shevchenko (c)	def.	Liz Carmouche	Decision (unanimous) (50–45, 50–45, 50–45)	5	5:00	UFC Fight Night 156	(Note: For the UFC Women's Flyweight Championship.)
Heavyweight	Stipe Miocic	def.	Daniel Cormier (c)	TKO (punches)	4	4:09	UFC 241	(Note: For the UFC Heavyweight Championship.)
Women's Strawweight	Zhang Weili	def.	Jéssica Andrade (c)	TKO (knees and punches)	1	0:42	UFC Fight Night 157	(Note: For the UFC Women's Strawweight Championship.)
Lightweight	Khabib Nurmagomedov (c)	def.	Dustin Poirier (ic)	Submission (rear-naked choke)	3	2:06	UFC 242	(Note: For the UFC Lightweight Championship.)
Middleweight	Israel Adesanya (ic)	def.	Robert Whittaker (c)	KO (punches)	2	3:33	UFC 243	(Note: For the UFC Middleweight Championship.)
Women's Bantamweight	Amanda Nunes (c)	def.	Germaine de Randamie	Decision (unanimous) (49–44, 49–46, 49–45)	5	5:00	UFC 245	(Note: For the UFC Women's Bantamweight Championship.)
Featherweight	Alexander Volkanovski	def.	Max Holloway (c)	Decision (unanimous) (48–47, 48–47, 50–45)	5	5:00	UFC 245	(Note: For the UFC Featherweight Championship.)
Welterweight	Kamaru Usman (c)	def.	Colby Covington	TKO (punches)	5	4:10	UFC 245	(Note: For the UFC Welterweight Championship.)

== Events list ==
#	Event	Date	Venue	City	Country	Atten.	Ref.	Fight of the Night			Performance of the Night		Bonus	Ref.
505	UFC Fight Night: Edgar vs. The Korean Zombie	Dec 21, 2019	Sajik Arena	Busan	South Korea	10,651		Charles Jourdain	vs.	Doo Ho Choi	Chan Sung Jung	Alexandre Pantoja	$50,000	
504	UFC 245: Usman vs. Covington	Dec 14, 2019	T-Mobile Arena	Las Vegas	United States	16,811		Kamaru Usman	vs.	Colby Covington	Petr Yan	Irene Aldana	$50,000	
503	UFC on ESPN: Overeem vs. Rozenstruik	Dec 7, 2019	Capital One Arena	Washington, D.C.	United States	10,816		Rob Font	vs.	Ricky Simon	Bryce Mitchell	Makhmud Muradov	$50,000	
502	UFC Fight Night: Błachowicz vs. Jacaré	Nov 16, 2019	Ginásio do Ibirapuera	São Paulo	Brazil	10,344		—N/a			Charles Oliveira	James Krause	$50,000	
502	UFC Fight Night: Błachowicz vs. Jacaré	Nov 16, 2019	Ginásio do Ibirapuera	São Paulo	Brazil	10,344		—N/a			Ricardo Ramos	Randy Brown	$50,000	
501	UFC Fight Night: Magomedsharipov vs. Kattar	Nov 9, 2019	CSKA Arena	Moscow	Russia	11,305		Zabit Magomedsharipov	vs.	Calvin Kattar	Magomed Ankalaev	David Zawada	$50,000	
500	UFC 244: Masvidal vs. Diaz	Nov 2, 2019	Madison Square Garden	New York City	United States	20,143		Stephen Thompson	vs.	Vicente Luque	Kevin Lee	Corey Anderson	$50,000	
499	UFC Fight Night: Maia vs. Askren	Oct 26, 2019	Singapore Indoor Stadium	Kallang	Singapore	7,155		Demian Maia	vs.	Ben Askren	Beneil Dariush	Ciryl Gane	$50,000	
498	UFC on ESPN: Reyes vs. Weidman	Oct 18, 2019	TD Garden	Boston	United States	12,066		Yair Rodríguez	vs.	Jeremy Stephens	Dominick Reyes	Charles Rosa	$50,000	
497	UFC Fight Night: Joanna vs. Waterson	Oct 12, 2019	Amalie Arena	Tampa	United States	10,597		Cub Swanson	vs.	Kron Gracie	Niko Price	Marlon Vera	$50,000	
496	UFC 243: Whittaker vs. Adesanya	Oct 6, 2019	Marvel Stadium	Melbourne	Australia	57,127		Brad Riddell	vs.	Jamie Mullarkey	Israel Adesanya	Yorgan De Castro	$50,000	:
495	UFC Fight Night: Hermansson vs. Cannonier	Sep 28, 2019	Royal Arena	Copenhagen	Denmark	12,767		—N/a			Jared Cannonier	Ovince Saint Preux	$50,000	
495	UFC Fight Night: Hermansson vs. Cannonier	Sep 28, 2019	Royal Arena	Copenhagen	Denmark	12,767		—N/a			John Phillips	Jack Shore	$50,000	
494	UFC Fight Night: Rodríguez vs. Stephens	Sep 21, 2019	Mexico City Arena	Mexico City	Mexico	10,112		Carla Esparza	vs.	Alexa Grasso	Steven Peterson	Paul Craig	$50,000	
493	UFC Fight Night: Cowboy vs. Gaethje	Sep 14, 2019	Rogers Arena	Vancouver	Canada	15,114		Tristan Connelly	vs.	Michel Pereira	Justin Gaethje	Misha Cirkunov	$50,000	
492	UFC 242: Khabib vs. Poirier	Sep 7, 2019	The Arena, Yas Island	Abu Dhabi	United Arab Emirates	—N/a					Khabib Nurmagomedov	Ottman Azaitar	$50,000	
492	UFC 242: Khabib vs. Poirier	Sep 7, 2019	The Arena, Yas Island	Abu Dhabi	United Arab Emirates	—N/a					Belal Muhammad	Muslim Salikhov	$50,000	
491	UFC Fight Night: Andrade vs. Zhang	Aug 31, 2019	Shenzhen Universiade Sports Centre Arena	Shenzhen	China	10,302		Alateng Heili	vs.	Danaa Batgerel	Zhang Weili	Li Jingliang	$50,000	
490	UFC 241: Cormier vs. Miocic 2	Aug 17, 2019	Honda Center	Anaheim	United States	17,304		Paulo Costa	vs.	Yoel Romero	Stipe Miocic	Khama Worthy	$50,000	
489	UFC Fight Night: Shevchenko vs. Carmouche 2	Aug 10, 2019	Antel Arena	Montevideo	Uruguay	9,225		Vicente Luque	vs.	Mike Perry	Volkan Oezdemir	Veronica Macedo	$50,000	
488	UFC on ESPN: Covington vs. Lawler	Aug 3, 2019	Prudential Center	Newark	United States	10,427		Antonina Shevchenko	vs.	Lucie Pudilová	Nasrat Haqparast	Matt Schnell	$50,000	
487	UFC 240: Holloway vs. Edgar	Jul 27, 2019	Rogers Place	Edmonton	Canada	12,144		Deiveson Figueiredo	vs.	Alexandre Pantoja	Geoff Neal	Hakeem Dawodu	$50,000	
486	UFC on ESPN: dos Anjos vs. Edwards	Jul 20, 2019	AT&T Center	San Antonio	United States	9,255		Mario Bautista	vs.	Jin Soo Son	Walt Harris	Dan Hooker	$50,000	
485	UFC Fight Night: de Randamie vs. Ladd	Jul 13, 2019	Golden 1 Center	Sacramento	United States	10,306		—N/a			Urijah Faber	Josh Emmett	$50,000	
485	UFC Fight Night: de Randamie vs. Ladd	Jul 13, 2019	Golden 1 Center	Sacramento	United States	10,306		—N/a			Andre Fili	Jonathan Martinez	$50,000	
484	UFC 239: Jones vs. Santos	Jul 6, 2019	T-Mobile Arena	Las Vegas	United States	18,358		—N/a			Amanda Nunes	Jorge Masvidal	$50,000	
484	UFC 239: Jones vs. Santos	Jul 6, 2019	T-Mobile Arena	Las Vegas	United States	18,358		—N/a			Jan Błachowicz	Yadong Song	$50,000	
483	UFC on ESPN: Ngannou vs. dos Santos	Jun 29, 2019	Target Center	Minneapolis	United States	10,123		—N/a			Francis Ngannou	Joseph Benavidez	$50,000	
483	UFC on ESPN: Ngannou vs. dos Santos	Jun 29, 2019	Target Center	Minneapolis	United States	10,123		—N/a			Alonzo Menifield	Eryk Anders	$50,000	
482	UFC Fight Night: Moicano vs. The Korean Zombie	Jun 22, 2019	Bon Secours Wellness Arena	Greenville	United States	7,682		Deron Winn	vs.	Eric Spicely	Chan Sung Jung	Jairzinho Rozenstruik	$50,000	
481	UFC 238: Cejudo vs. Moraes	Jun 8, 2019	United Center	Chicago	United States	16,083		Tony Ferguson	vs.	Donald Cerrone	Henry Cejudo	Valentina Shevchenko	$50,000	
480	UFC Fight Night: Gustafsson vs. Smith	Jun 1, 2019	Ericsson Globe	Stockholm	Sweden	14,319		—N/a			Anthony Smith	Aleksandar Rakić	$50,000	
480	UFC Fight Night: Gustafsson vs. Smith	Jun 1, 2019	Ericsson Globe	Stockholm	Sweden	14,319		—N/a			Makwan Amirkhani	Leonardo Santos	$50,000	
479	UFC Fight Night: dos Anjos vs. Lee	May 18, 2019	Blue Cross Arena	Rochester	United States	8,132		Aspen Ladd	vs.	Sijara Eubanks	Michel Pereira	Grant Dawson	$50,000	
478	UFC 237: Namajunas vs. Andrade	May 11, 2019	Jeunesse Arena	Rio de Janeiro	Brazil	15,193		Jéssica Andrade	vs.	Rose Namajunas	Jéssica Andrade	Warlley Alves	$50,000	
477	UFC Fight Night: Iaquinta vs. Cowboy	May 4, 2019	Canadian Tire Centre	Ottawa	Canada	10,960		Donald Cerrone	vs.	Al Iaquinta	Walt Harris	Macy Chiasson	$50,000	
476	UFC Fight Night: Jacaré vs. Hermansson	Apr 27, 2019	BB&T Center	Sunrise	United States	12,254		Mike Perry	vs.	Alex Oliveira	Glover Teixeira	Jim Miller	$50,000	
475	UFC Fight Night: Overeem vs. Oleinik	Apr 20, 2019	Yubileyny Sports Palace	Saint Petersburg	Russia	7,236		Islam Makhachev	vs.	Arman Tsarukyan	Magomed Mustafaev	Sergei Pavlovich	$50,000	
474	UFC 236: Holloway vs. Poirier 2	Apr 13, 2019	State Farm Arena	Atlanta	United States	14,297		Israel Adesanya	vs.	Kelvin Gastelum	—N/a		$50,000	
474	UFC 236: Holloway vs. Poirier 2	Apr 13, 2019	State Farm Arena	Atlanta	United States	14,297		Dustin Poirier	vs.	Max Holloway	—N/a		$50,000	
473	UFC on ESPN: Barboza vs. Gaethje	Mar 30, 2019	Wells Fargo Center	Philadelphia	United States	11,123		Justin Gaethje	vs.	Edson Barboza	Paul Craig	Jack Hermansson	$50,000	
472	UFC Fight Night: Thompson vs. Pettis	Mar 23, 2019	Bridgestone Arena	Nashville	United States	10,863		Bryce Mitchell	vs.	Bobby Moffett	Anthony Pettis	Randa Markos	$50,000	
471	UFC Fight Night: Till vs. Masvidal	Mar 16, 2019	The O_{2} Arena	London	England	16,602		Jorge Masvidal	vs.	Darren Till	Jorge Masvidal	Dan Ige	$50,000	
470	UFC Fight Night: Lewis vs. dos Santos	Mar 9, 2019	Intrust Bank Arena	Wichita	United States	7,265		Junior dos Santos	vs.	Derrick Lewis	Niko Price	Beneil Dariush	$50,000	
469	UFC 235: Jones vs. Smith	Mar 2, 2019	T-Mobile Arena	Las Vegas	United States	14,790		Pedro Munhoz	vs.	Cody Garbrandt	Johnny Walker	Diego Sanchez	$50,000	
468	UFC Fight Night: Błachowicz vs. Santos	Feb 23, 2019	O_{2} Arena	Prague	Czech Republic	16,583		—N/a			Thiago Santos	Stefan Struve	$50,000	
468	UFC Fight Night: Błachowicz vs. Santos	Feb 23, 2019	O_{2} Arena	Prague	Czech Republic	16,583		—N/a			Michał Oleksiejczuk	Dwight Grant	$50,000	
467	UFC on ESPN: Ngannou vs. Velasquez	Feb 17, 2019	Talking Stick Resort Arena	Phoenix	United States	14,269		Vicente Luque	vs.	Bryan Barberena	Kron Gracie	Luke Sanders	$50,000	
466	UFC 234: Adesanya vs. Silva	Feb 10, 2019	Rod Laver Arena	Melbourne	Australia	15,238		Israel Adesanya	vs.	Anderson Silva	Montana De La Rosa	Devonte Smith	$50,000	
465	UFC Fight Night: Assunção vs. Moraes 2	Feb 2, 2019	Centro de Formação Olímpica do Nordeste	Fortaleza	Brazil	10,040		—N/a			Marlon Moraes	José Aldo	$50,000	
465	UFC Fight Night: Assunção vs. Moraes 2	Feb 2, 2019	Centro de Formação Olímpica do Nordeste	Fortaleza	Brazil	10,040		—N/a			Charles Oliveira	Johnny Walker	$50,000	
–	UFC 233	Jan 26, 2019	Honda Center	Anaheim	United States	Cancelled		—N/a					Cancelled	—N/a
464	UFC Fight Night: Cejudo vs. Dillashaw	Jan 19, 2019	Barclays Center	Brooklyn	United States	12,152		Donald Cerrone	vs.	Alexander Hernandez	Donald Cerrone	Henry Cejudo	$50,000	

== See also ==
- UFC
- List of UFC champions
- List of UFC events
- List of current UFC fighters
