= UFC on ESPN: Ngannou vs. dos Santos =

UFC mixed martial arts event in 2019

- The poster for UFC on ESPN: Ngannou vs. dos Santos
- Promotion: Ultimate Fighting Championship
- Date: June 29, 2019
- Venue: Target Center
- City: Minneapolis, Minnesota
- Attendance: 10,123
- Total gate: $952,204.77

Event chronology
UFC Fight Night: Moicano vs. The Korean Zombie	UFC on ESPN: Ngannou vs. dos Santos	UFC 239: Jones vs. Santos

UFC on ESPN: Ngannou vs. dos Santos (also known as UFC on ESPN 3) was a mixed martial arts event produced by the Ultimate Fighting Championship that was held on June 29, 2019, at Target Center in Minneapolis, Minnesota, USA.

== Background ==
The event was the promotion's third visit to Minneapolis and the first since UFC on FX: Browne vs. Bigfoot in October 2012.

A welterweight rematch between the former UFC Welterweight Champions Tyron Woodley and Robbie Lawler was expected to be the event headliner. Woodley won the title in their first encounter via first-round knockout in July 2016 at UFC 201. However, it was reported on May 16, 2019, that Woodley had suffered a hand injury and was pulled out of the fight. As a result, Lawler was removed from the card as well. Subsequently, a heavyweight bout between the former UFC Heavyweight Champion Junior dos Santos and former title challenger Francis Ngannou was scheduled as the event headliner instead. The pairing had been scheduled twice before, first at UFC 215 and then at UFC 239, but in both instances the fights were scrapped.

A light heavyweight bout between Roman Dolidze and Vinicius Moreira was scheduled to take place at the event. However, an unknown reason saw Dolidze pull out of the fight on May 7 and he was replaced by Eryk Anders.

A featherweight bout between Chas Skelly and Jordan Griffin was originally scheduled for this event. However, on June 13, Skelly pulled out of the fight citing injury. Griffin was then booked to face promotional newcomer Vince Murdock. On June 27, Murdock announced that he was not medically cleared to compete and the bout was removed from the card. On September 5, 2019, it was reported that Murdock had received a 20-month suspension by USADA, having tested positive for GW1516, better known as Cardarine and often sold on the black market as Endurobol, on a sample collected on July 6, 2019. Later in 2019, Murdock revealed that the reason behind withdrawing from the bout was initially high grade stenosis which was later diagnosed as Moyamoya disease.

A bantamweight bout between Sergio Pettis and Ricardo Ramos was scheduled to take place at this event but, on June 15, it was reported that Pettis had pulled out of the bout for undisclosed reasons and had been replaced by newcomer Journey Newson.

A light heavyweight bout between Justin Ledet and Dalcha Lungiambula was scheduled to take place at this event but, on June 24, it was announced that Ledet was removed from the card. He was replaced by promotional newcomer Dequan Townsend.

== Results ==
Main card (ESPN)
Weight class				Method	Round	Time	Notes
Heavyweight	Francis Ngannou	def.	Junior dos Santos	TKO (punches)	1	1:11
Flyweight	Joseph Benavidez	def.	Jussier Formiga	TKO (head kick and punches)	2	4:47
Welterweight	Demian Maia	def.	Anthony Rocco Martin	Decision (majority) (29–28, 29–28, 28–28)	3	5:00
Lightweight	Vinc Pichel	def.	Roosevelt Roberts	Decision (unanimous) (29–28, 29–28, 29–28)	3	5:00
Lightweight	Drew Dober	def.	Polo Reyes	KO (punches)	1	1:07
Light Heavyweight	Alonzo Menifield	def.	Paul Craig	KO (punches)	1	3:19
Preliminary Card (ESPN)
Bantamweight	Ricardo Ramos	def.	Journey Newson	Decision (unanimous) (30–27, 30–27, 30–27)	3	5:00
Light Heavyweight	Eryk Anders	def.	Vinicius Moreira	KO (punches)	1	1:18
Lightweight	Jared Gordon	def.	Dan Moret	Decision (unanimous) (30–27, 30–27, 29–28)	3	5:00
Light Heavyweight	Dalcha Lungiambula	def.	Dequan Townsend	TKO (punches and elbows)	3	0:42
Women's Strawweight	Amanda Ribas	def.	Emily Whitmire	Submission (rear-naked choke)	2	2:10
Heavyweight	Maurice Greene	def.	Júnior Albini	TKO (punches)	1	3:38

== Bonus awards ==
The following fighters received $50,000 bonuses.

- Fight of the Night: No bonus awarded.
- Performance of the Night: Francis Ngannou, Joseph Benavidez, Alonzo Menifield and Eryk Anders

== See also ==
- List of UFC events
- 2019 in UFC
- List of current UFC fighters
