= Misha Cirkunov =

Canadian mixed martial arts fighter

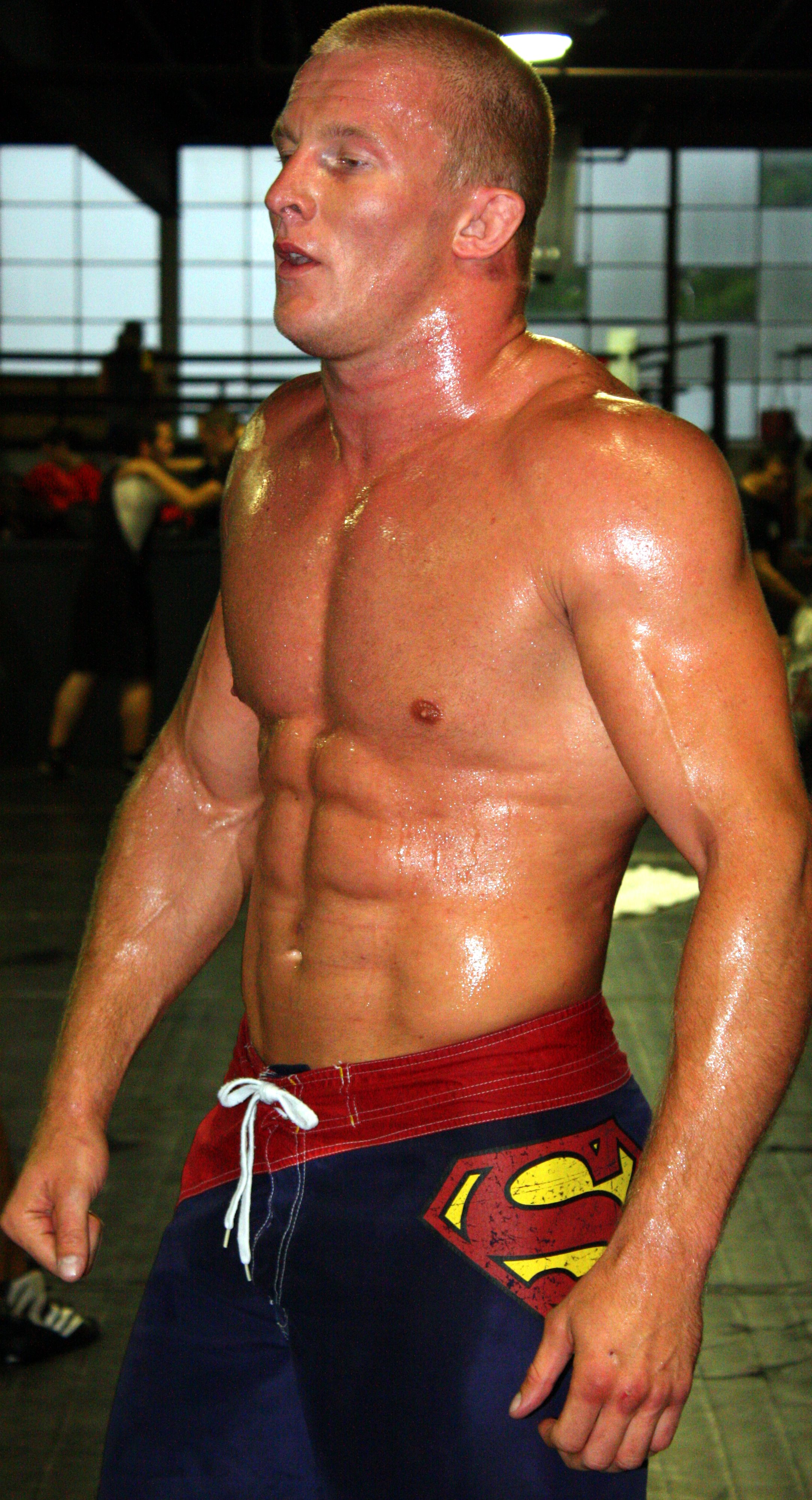
- Photo by Todd Prescott
- Born: Mihails Cirkunovs; February 27, 1987 (age 39); Riga, Latvian SSR
- Nationality: Latvia; Canada
- Height: 6 ft 3 in (1.91 m)
- Weight: 205 lb (93 kg; 14.6 st)
- Division: Middleweight (2021); Light heavyweight (2010–2021, 2022–present)
- Reach: 77 in (196 cm)
- Fighting out of: Toronto, Ontario, Canada
- Team: Xtreme Couture (2010–present)
- Rank: Black belt in Brazilian Jiu-Jitsu
- Years active: 2010–2022

Mixed martial arts record
- Total: 24
- Wins: 15
- By knockout: 5
- By submission: 8
- By decision: 2
- Losses: 9
- By knockout: 5
- By submission: 3
- By decision: 1

Other information
- Mixed martial arts record from Sherdog

Misha Cirkunov (Latvian: Mihails Cirkunovs, born February 27, 1987), is a Latvian-Canadian professional mixed martial artist, who most recently competed in the Light heavyweight division of the Ultimate Fighting Championship (UFC).

== Background ==
Son of Oleg and Olga, Cirkunov was born in Riga, Latvia (Latvian SSR) in 1987. In his childhood, Cirkunov was active in various sports like swimming, basketball, judo and karate. Growing up, Cirkunov dabbled into dubious circles which prompted the family to emigrate to Toronto, Ontario, when he was 13. With no skills in English, Cirkunov struggled in school but continued training judo and also picked up wrestling.

Cirkunov won junior nationals in judo in 2003, Greco-Roman wrestling national championship in 2005 and national championships in freestyle wrestling in 2005 and 2006. After winning the latter championship, Cirkunov became a Canadian citizen. After graduating from high school Cirkunov found Brazilian jiu-jitsu, briefly relocating to Las Vegas to train but returned to Canada to open his own gym. In 2008, Cirkunov won the black belt super heavy division at the Pan No-Gi Jiu-Jitsu Championship. After the unsuccessful venture as a gym owner, he started training at an Xtreme Couture satellite gym in Etobicoke.

== Mixed martial arts career ==
=== Early career ===
Cirkunov made his professional debut in January 2010 and amassed a record of 9–2 before signing a four-fight contract with the Ultimate Fighting Championship in the summer of 2015.

=== Ultimate Fighting Championship ===
Cirkunov was expected to make his promotional debut against Sean O'Connell on August 23, 2015, at UFC Fight Night 74. O'Connell withdrew from the bout due to injury and was replaced by Daniel Jolly. Cirkunov defeated Jolly via first-round KO after achieving full mount and battering him when he turned his back.

Cirkunov faced promotional newcomer Alex Nicholson on February 6, 2016, at UFC Fight Night 82. Cirkunov submitted Alex Nicholson via a second-round neck crank, breaking both sides of his jaw in the process, after earlier breaking his nose. At the post-fight press conference, he told reporters, "I’m just really happy with the performance and especially – not just the submission – but I was able to break his jaw. I’m impressed."

Cirkunov next faced another promotional newcomer in Ion Cuțelaba on June 18, 2016, at UFC Fight Night 89. He won the fight via submission in the third round.

Cirkunov faced Nikita Krylov on December 10, 2016, at UFC 206. He won the fight via submission in the first round.

In March 2017, Cirkunov signed a new, six-fight deal with UFC and fought Volkan Oezdemir on May 28, 2017, at UFC Fight Night 109. He lost the fight via knockout in just 28 seconds of the very first round.

Cirkunov was scheduled to face Glover Teixeira on October 28, 2017, at UFC Fight Night 119. However, the pairing was delayed after a recent hand surgery for Teixeira was slow to heal and the bout eventually took place on December 16, 2017, at UFC on Fox 26. Cirkunov lost the fight via TKO in the first round.

Cirkunov faced Patrick Cummins on October 27, 2018, at UFC Fight Night 138. He won the fight by submission in the first round via an arm triangle choke.

Cirkunov was expected to face Ovince Saint Preux on March 2, 2019, at UFC 235. However, on February 11, it was announced that Saint Preux suffered an injury and was pulled from the fight. Cirkunov instead faced Johnny Walker. He lost the fight via TKO in the first round.

Cirkunov faced Jimmy Crute on September 14, 2019, at UFC Fight Night 158. He won the back-and-forth fight via a Peruvian necktie submission in the first round. The win also earned Cirkunov his first Performance of the Night bonus award.

Cirkunov was expected to face Ryan Spann on December 19, 2020, at UFC Fight Night 183. However, Cirkunov pulled out in early December due to an injury. The fight was rescheduled to March 13, 2021, at UFC Fight Night 187. Cirkunov lost the fight via technical knockout in round one.

Cirkunov faced Krzysztof Jotko in a middleweight bout on October 2, 2021, at UFC Fight Night 193. He lost the fight via split decision.

Cirkunov was scheduled to face Makhmud Muradov on February 26, 2022, at UFC Fight Night 202. However, Muradov pulled out in late January due to a hand injury and he was replaced by Wellington Turman. Cirkunov lost the fight via armbar in the second round.

After two straight losses at Middleweight, Misha was scheduled to return to Light heavyweight against Shamil Gamzatov on August 6, 2022, at UFC on ESPN: Santos vs. Hill. However, Gamzatov was unable to obtain a US visa and the bout was scrapped.

Cirkunov faced Alonzo Menifield on October 15, 2022, at UFC Fight Night 212. He lost the fight via knockout in round one.

In late October 2022, it was reported that Cirkunov was released by the UFC.

In May 2025, Cirkunov filed a class action anti-trust lawsuit, specifically challenges the enforceability of arbitration clauses and class action waivers in UFC contracts.

== Championships and accomplishments ==
=== Mixed martial arts ===
- Ultimate Fighting Championship
  - Performance of the Night (One time) vs. Jimmy Crute
  - UFC.com Awards
    - 2019: Ranked #8 Submission of the Year vs. Jimmy Crute

== Mixed martial arts record ==
Professional record breakdown
24 matches	15 wins	9 losses
By knockout	5	5
By submission	8	3
By decision	2	1

Res.	Record	Opponent	Method	Event	Date	Round	Time	Location	Notes
Loss	15–9	Alonzo Menifield	KO (punches)	UFC Fight Night: Grasso vs. Araújo	October 15, 2022	1	1:28	Las Vegas, Nevada, United States	Return to Light Heavyweight.
Loss	15–8	Wellington Turman	Submission (armbar)	UFC Fight Night: Makhachev vs. Green	February 26, 2022	2	1:29	Las Vegas, Nevada, United States	
Loss	15–7	Krzysztof Jotko	Decision (split)	UFC Fight Night: Santos vs. Walker	October 2, 2021	3	5:00	Las Vegas, Nevada, United States	Middleweight debut.
Loss	15–6	Ryan Spann	TKO (punches)	UFC Fight Night: Edwards vs. Muhammad	March 13, 2021	1	1:11	Las Vegas, Nevada, United States	
Win	15–5	Jimmy Crute	Submission (peruvian necktie)	UFC Fight Night: Cowboy vs. Gaethje	September 14, 2019	1	3:38	Vancouver, British Columbia, Canada	Performance of the Night.
Loss	14–5	Johnny Walker	TKO (flying knee and punches)	UFC 235	March 2, 2019	1	0:38	Las Vegas, Nevada, United States	
Win	14–4	Patrick Cummins	Submission (arm-triangle choke)	UFC Fight Night: Volkan vs. Smith	October 27, 2018	1	2:40	Moncton, New Brunswick, Canada	
Loss	13–4	Glover Teixeira	TKO (punches)	UFC on Fox: Lawler vs. dos Anjos	December 16, 2017	1	2:45	Winnipeg, Manitoba, Canada	
Loss	13–3	Volkan Oezdemir	KO (punch)	UFC Fight Night: Gustafsson vs. Teixeira	May 28, 2017	1	0:28	Stockholm, Sweden	
Win	13–2	Nikita Krylov	Submission (guillotine choke)	UFC 206	December 10, 2016	1	4:38	Toronto, Ontario, Canada	
Win	12–2	Ion Cuțelaba	Submission (arm-triangle choke)	UFC Fight Night: MacDonald vs. Thompson	June 18, 2016	3	1:22	Ottawa, Ontario, Canada	
Win	11–2	Alex Nicholson	Submission (neck crank)	UFC Fight Night: Hendricks vs. Thompson	February 6, 2016	2	1:28	Las Vegas, Nevada, United States	
Win	10–2	Daniel Jolly	KO (punches)	UFC Fight Night: Holloway vs. Oliveira	August 23, 2015	1	4:45	Saskatoon, Saskatchewan, Canada	
Win	9–2	Shaun Asher	Submission (armbar)	Hard Knocks 43	May 22, 2015	1	1:20	Calgary, Alberta, Canada	Defended the HKFC Light Heavyweight Championship.
Win	8–2	Rodney Wallace	TKO (head kick)	Hard Knocks 41	January 30, 2015	1	2:00	Calgary, Alberta, Canada	Won the HKFC Light Heavyweight Championship.
Win	7–2	Martin Desilets	Submission (inverted triangle choke)	PFC 2	March 8, 2014	1	2:36	London, Ontario, Canada	
Win	6–2	Jon Ganshorn	Submission (armbar)	Fivestar FL 9: Northern Nightmare	September 7, 2013	1	1:59	Yellowknife, Northwest Territories, Canada	
Loss	5–2	Aaron Johnson	Submission (heel hook)	King of the Ring VI	March 17, 2012	1	2:11	Norcross, Georgia, United States	
Win	5–1	Ali Mokdad	Decision (unanimous)	Score Fighting Series 3	December 3, 2011	3	5:00	Sarnia, Ontario, Canada	
Win	4–1	Ion Cherdivara	Decision (unanimous)	Knockout Entertainment - MMA: The Reckoning	April 2, 2011	3	5:00	Orillia, Ontario, Canada	
Win	3–1	Ricardeau Francois	TKO (punches)	Ultimate Generation Combat 26	March 4, 2011	1	0:56	Montreal, Quebec, Canada	
Win	2–1	Shawn Pauliuk	Submission (punches)	Armageddon FC 3: Evolution	July 17, 2010	1	0:57	Victoria, British Columbia, Canada	Catchweight (210 lb) bout.
Loss	1–1	Roy Boughton	Submission (armbar)	Warrior One MMA 5	June 19, 2010	2	2:33	Montreal, Quebec, Canada	
Win	1–0	Jeff Doyle	TKO (punches)	Ringside MMA 5: Triple Threat	January 30, 2010	1	0:40	Montreal, Quebec, Canada	
