= UFC 244 =

UFC mixed martial arts event in 2019

UFC 244: Masvidal vs. Diaz
- The poster for UFC 244: Masvidal vs. Diaz
- Promotion: Ultimate Fighting Championship
- Date: November 2, 2019
- Venue: Madison Square Garden
- City: New York City, New York, United States
- Attendance: 20,143
- Total gate: $6,575,996.19

Event chronology
UFC Fight Night: Maia vs. Askren	UFC 244: Masvidal vs. Diaz	UFC Fight Night: Zabit vs. Kattar

UFC 244: Masvidal vs. Diaz was a mixed martial arts pay-per-view event produced by the Ultimate Fighting Championship that took place on November 2, 2019, at Madison Square Garden in New York City, New York, United States. It was the UFC's 500th live event.

== Background ==
=== Card changes and main event jeopardy ===
A welterweight bout between Jorge Masvidal and former UFC Lightweight Championship challenger and The Ultimate Fighter 5 lightweight winner Nate Diaz headlined the event. After his UFC 241 win against former lightweight champion Anthony Pettis, Diaz proclaimed himself the "baddest motherfucker in the game" and issued a challenge to Masvidal. When the fight was scheduled, Dana White announced that a celebratory "baddest motherfucker" belt, embossed "BMF," would be awarded to the winner. However, on October 24, Diaz tweeted a statement saying he would not be competing due to an adverse drug test finding, which put the bout in jeopardy. On October 26, the UFC announced that Diaz had been cleared to compete, as his positive test had traces of LGD-4033, or Ligandrol, a selective androgen receptor modulator which was known to be linked to a tainted batch of organic, vegan multivitamins.

Krzysztof Jotko was scheduled to face Edmen Shahbazyan at the event. However, Jotko was removed from the card in early October for undisclosed reasons and replaced by Brad Tavares.

=== Weigh-ins ===
At the weigh-ins, former Invicta FC Flyweight Champion Jennifer Maia weighed in at 127.2 pounds, 1.2 pounds over the flyweight non-title fight limit of 126 pounds. The bout proceeded at a catchweight and Maia was fined 25% of her purse, which went to her opponent Katlyn Chookagian.

Prior to the ceremonial weigh-ins, the New York State Athletic Commission (NYSAC) issued a rare statement in which it was announced that they would be pursuing disciplinary action against The Ultimate Fighter: Team Jones vs. Team Sonnen middleweight winner and former interim title challenger Kelvin Gastelum. In the statement, the Athletic Commission stated that following a review of Gastelum's weigh-in video they "determined that Mr. Gastelum made contact with another person while on the scale, a violation of the weigh in policy. In light of this violation, the Commission will pursue disciplinary action. At this time, the official weight determination will not be disturbed, and Mr. Gastelum will not be disqualified from competing in UFC 244."

=== Fines ===
On November 8, it was announced that Corey Anderson had been fined $10,000 by the NYSAC for "unsportsmanlike and disorderly conduct" for taunting and screaming at Johnny Walker and shoving the referee away during his post-fight celebration. Kelvin Gastelum was also fined $1,000 for making physical contact with his coach Rafael Cordeiro while on the scale at the weigh-ins.

== Results ==
Main card
Weight class				Method	Round	Time	Notes
Welterweight	Jorge Masvidal	def.	Nate Diaz	TKO (doctor stoppage)	3	5:00	(Note: For the inaugural symbolic UFC "BMF" belt.)
Middleweight	Darren Till	def.	Kelvin Gastelum	Decision (split) (27–30, 29–28, 30–27)	3	5:00
Welterweight	Stephen Thompson	def.	Vicente Luque	Decision (unanimous) (30–26, 30–26, 29–27)	3	5:00
Heavyweight	Derrick Lewis	def.	Blagoy Ivanov	Decision (split) (30–27, 28–29, 29–28)	3	5:00
Lightweight	Kevin Lee	def.	Gregor Gillespie	KO (head kick)	1	2:47
Preliminary card (ESPN2)
Light Heavyweight	Corey Anderson	def.	Johnny Walker	TKO (punches)	1	2:07
Featherweight	Shane Burgos	def.	Makwan Amirkhani	TKO (punches)	3	4:32
Middleweight	Edmen Shahbazyan	def.	Brad Tavares	KO (head kick)	1	2:27
Heavyweight	Jairzinho Rozenstruik	def.	Andrei Arlovski	KO (punch)	1	0:29
Early Preliminary card (UFC Fight Pass)
Catchweight (127.2 lb)	Katlyn Chookagian	def.	Jennifer Maia	Decision (unanimous) (29–28, 29–28, 29–28)	3	5:00
Welterweight	Lyman Good	def.	Chance Rencountre	TKO (punches)	3	2:03
Featherweight	Hakeem Dawodu	def.	Julio Arce	Decision (split) (29–28, 28–29, 29–28)	3	5:00

== Bonus awards ==
The following fighters received $50,000 bonuses.

- Fight of the Night: Stephen Thompson vs. Vicente Luque
- Performance of the Night: Kevin Lee and Corey Anderson

== See also ==
- List of UFC events
- 2019 in UFC
- List of current UFC fighters
