= UFC 239 =

UFC mixed martial arts event in 2019

UFC 239: Jones vs. Santos
- The poster for UFC 239: Jones vs. Santos
- Promotion: Ultimate Fighting Championship
- Date: July 6, 2019
- Venue: T-Mobile Arena
- City: Paradise, Nevada
- Attendance: 18,358
- Total gate: $6,063,707.11

Event chronology
UFC on ESPN: Ngannou vs. dos Santos	UFC 239: Jones vs. Santos	UFC Fight Night: de Randamie vs. Ladd

UFC 239: Jones vs. Santos was a mixed martial arts event produced by the Ultimate Fighting Championship that was held on July 6, 2019, at T-Mobile Arena in Paradise, Nevada, part of the Las Vegas Metropolitan Area.

== Background ==
A UFC Light Heavyweight Championship bout between current two-time champion Jon Jones and Thiago Santos served as the event headliner.

A UFC Women's Bantamweight Championship bout between the current champion Amanda Nunes (also current UFC Women's Featherweight Champion) and former champion Holly Holm served as the event co-headliner.

A bout between former UFC Heavyweight title challenger Francis Ngannou and former UFC Heavyweight Champion Junior dos Santos was scheduled to take place at this event. The matchup was originally scheduled to take place in September 2017 at UFC 215, but dos Santos pulled out of that event, citing a failed drug test. However, it was reported on May 21, that the bout was being moved to headline UFC on ESPN 3 after former UFC Welterweight Champion Tyron Woodley was forced to pull out of his rematch against also former champion Robbie Lawler due to a hand injury.

A featherweight bout between former Strikeforce and WEC Lightweight Champion (as well as former UFC Lightweight Championship challenger) Gilbert Melendez and Arnold Allen headlined the prelims of the event. The matchup was originally scheduled to take place in November 2018 at The Ultimate Fighter: Heavy Hitters Finale, however Melendez pulled out of the fight citing an injury.

A bantamweight bout between The Ultimate Fighter: Latin America bantamweight winner Alejandro Pérez and Song Yadong took place at this event. The matchup was originally scheduled to take place in March 2019 at UFC 235, but Song pulled out of the fight for undisclosed reasons.

Sean O'Malley was expected to face Marlon Vera at the event. However, O'Malley announced his withdrawal from the bout on June 21 due a failed test for ostarine. The Nevada State Athletic Commission decided to suspend him due to the failed test, however the United States Anti Doping Association USADA did not impose any further sanctions. The ostarine in his system was likely residual from his previously failed test prior to UFC 229. Drako Rodriguez from King of the Cage was offered to replaced O'Malley initially; however the president of the promotion, Terry Trebilcock, refused to release him. Nohelin Hernandez served as the replacement.

Melissa Gatto was scheduled to face Julia Avila at the event. However, Gatto was removed from the card on June 24 for undisclosed reasons and was replaced by returning veteran Pannie Kianzad.

UFC 239 served as the first UFC to air on PPV in the United Kingdom. Following this event select UFC numbered events will now air on BT Sport Box Office in the United Kingdom.

== Results ==
Main card
Weight class				Method	Round	Time	Notes
Light Heavyweight	Jon Jones (c)	def.	Thiago Santos	Decision (split) (47–48, 48–47, 48–47)	5	5:00	(Note: For the UFC Light Heavyweight Championship.)
Women's Bantamweight	Amanda Nunes (c)	def.	Holly Holm	TKO (head kick and punches)	1	4:10	(Note: For the UFC Women's Bantamweight Championship.)
Welterweight	Jorge Masvidal	def.	Ben Askren	KO (flying knee)	1	0:05	(Note: Fastest knockout in UFC history.)
Light Heavyweight	Jan Błachowicz	def.	Luke Rockhold	KO (punches)	2	1:39
Welterweight	Michael Chiesa	def.	Diego Sanchez	Decision (unanimous) (30–26, 30–26, 30–26)	3	5:00
Preliminary card (ESPN)
Featherweight	Arnold Allen	def.	Gilbert Melendez	Decision (unanimous) (30–27, 30–27, 30–27)	3	5:00
Bantamweight	Marlon Vera	def.	Nohelin Hernandez	Submission (rear-naked choke)	2	3:25
Women's Strawweight	Cláudia Gadelha	def.	Randa Markos	Decision (unanimous) (30–27, 30–27, 30–27)	3	5:00
Bantamweight	Song Yadong	def.	Alejandro Pérez	KO (punch)	1	2:04
Early Preliminary card (UFC Fight Pass/ESPN+)
Middleweight	Edmen Shahbazyan	def.	Jack Marshman	Submission (rear-naked choke)	1	1:12
Welterweight	Chance Rencountre	def.	Ismail Naurdiev	Decision (unanimous) (29–27, 29–28, 30–27)	3	5:00
Women's Bantamweight	Julia Avila	def.	Pannie Kianzad	Decision (unanimous) (30–27, 30–26, 30–26)	3	5:00

== Bonus awards ==
The following fighters received $50,000 bonuses:

- Fight of the Night: No bonus awarded.
- Performance of the Night: Amanda Nunes, Jorge Masvidal, Jan Błachowicz, and Yadong Song

== Reported payout ==
The following is the reported payout to the fighters as reported to the Nevada State Athletic Commission. It does not include sponsor money and also does not include the UFC's traditional "fight night" bonuses. The total disclosed payroll for the event was $3,331,000.

- Jon Jones: $500,000 (no win bonus) def. Thiago Santos: $350,000
- Amanda Nunes: $500,000 (includes $200,000 win bonus) def. Holly Holm: $300,000
- Jorge Masvidal: $200,000 (includes $100,000 win bonus) def. Ben Askren: $210,000
- Jan Błachowicz: $92,000 (includes $46,000 win bonus) def. Luke Rockhold: $200,000
- Michael Chiesa: $104,000 (includes $52,000 win bonus) def. Diego Sanchez: $103,000
- Arnold Allen: $64,000 (includes $32,000 win bonus) def. Gilbert Melendez: $200,000
- Marlon Vera: $96,000 (includes $48,000 win bonus) def. Nohelin Hernandez: $12,000
- Cláudia Gadelha: $102,000 (includes $52,000 win bonus) def. Randa Markos: $30,000
- Song Yadong: $90,000 (includes $45,000 win bonus) def. Alejandro Pérez: $42,000
- Edmen Shahbazyan: $32,000 (includes $16,000 win bonus) def. Jack Marshman: $30,000
- Chance Recountre: $28,000 (includes $14,000 win bonus) def. Ismail Naurdiev: $14,000
- Julia Avila: $20,000 (includes $10,000 win bonus) def. Pannie Kianzad: $12,000

== See also ==
- List of UFC events
- 2019 in UFC
- List of current UFC fighters
