= UFC 238 =

UFC mixed martial arts event in 2019

UFC 238: Cejudo vs. Moraes
- The poster for UFC 238: Cejudo vs. Moraes
- Promotion: Ultimate Fighting Championship
- Date: June 8, 2019
- Venue: United Center
- City: Chicago, Illinois
- Attendance: 16,083
- Total gate: $2,034,387.49

Event chronology
UFC Fight Night: Gustafsson vs. Smith	UFC 238: Cejudo vs. Moraes	UFC Fight Night: Moicano vs. The Korean Zombie

UFC 238: Cejudo vs. Moraes was a mixed martial arts event produced by the Ultimate Fighting Championship that was held on June 8, 2019 at the United Center in Chicago, Illinois.

== Background ==
The event was headlined by a UFC Bantamweight Championship bout for the vacant title between 2008 Olympic gold medalist in freestyle wrestling and current UFC Flyweight Champion Henry Cejudo and former WSOF Bantamweight Champion Marlon Moraes. Two-time champion T.J. Dillashaw was suspended on March 20 due to a failed drug test in relation to his January loss against Cejudo for the flyweight title and therefore opted to vacate his title before having it stripped. Cejudo became the third man to become UFC champion in two divisions simultaneously and fourth fighter overall (after Conor McGregor at UFC 205, Daniel Cormier at UFC 226 and Amanda Nunes at UFC 232), as well as the seventh person overall to win a title in different divisions.

A UFC Women's Flyweight Championship bout between the reigning champion Valentina Shevchenko and Jessica Eye was the co-main event on the card.

A strawweight bout between Felice Herrig and Yan Xiaonan was scheduled for the event. However, it was reported on April 30 that Herrig withdrew from the event after suffering a torn ACL and was replaced by former Invicta FC Strawweight Champion Angela Hill.

== Results ==
Main card
Weight class				Method	Round	Time	Notes
Bantamweight	Henry Cejudo	def.	Marlon Moraes	TKO (punches)	3	4:51	(Note: For the vacant UFC Bantamweight Championship)
Women's Flyweight	Valentina Shevchenko (c)	def.	Jessica Eye	KO (head kick)	2	0:26	(Note: For the UFC Women's Flyweight Championship.)
Lightweight	Tony Ferguson	def.	Donald Cerrone	TKO (doctor stoppage)	2	5:00
Bantamweight	Petr Yan	def.	Jimmie Rivera	Decision (unanimous) (29–28, 29–28, 30–27)	3	5:00
Heavyweight	Blagoy Ivanov	def.	Tai Tuivasa	Decision (unanimous) (29–28, 30–27, 30–27)	3	5:00
Preliminary card (ESPN)
Women's Strawweight	Tatiana Suarez	def.	Nina Ansaroff	Decision (unanimous) (29–28, 29–28, 29–28)	3	5:00
Bantamweight	Aljamain Sterling	def.	Pedro Munhoz	Decision (unanimous) (30–27, 30–27, 30–27)	3	5:00
Women's Strawweight	Alexa Grasso	def.	Karolina Kowalkiewicz	Decision (unanimous) (30–27, 30–27, 30–27)	3	5:00
Featherweight	Calvin Kattar	def.	Ricardo Lamas	KO (punches)	1	4:06
Early Preliminary card (UFC Fight Pass)
Women's Strawweight	Yan Xiaonan	def.	Angela Hill	Decision (unanimous) (29–28, 29–28, 29–28)	3	5:00
Middleweight	Darren Stewart	def.	Bevon Lewis	Decision (unanimous) (29–28, 29–28, 30–27)	3	5:00
Bantamweight	Eddie Wineland	def.	Grigory Popov	KO (punch)	2	4:47
Women's Flyweight	Katlyn Chookagian	def.	Joanne Calderwood	Decision (unanimous) (30–27, 29–28, 29–28)	3	5:00

== Bonus awards ==
The following fighters received $50,000 bonuses:

- Fight of the Night: Tony Ferguson vs. Donald Cerrone
- Performance of the Night: Henry Cejudo and Valentina Shevchenko

== See also ==
- List of UFC events
- 2019 in UFC
- List of current UFC fighters
