= Jorge Masvidal =

American mixed martial artist (born 1984)

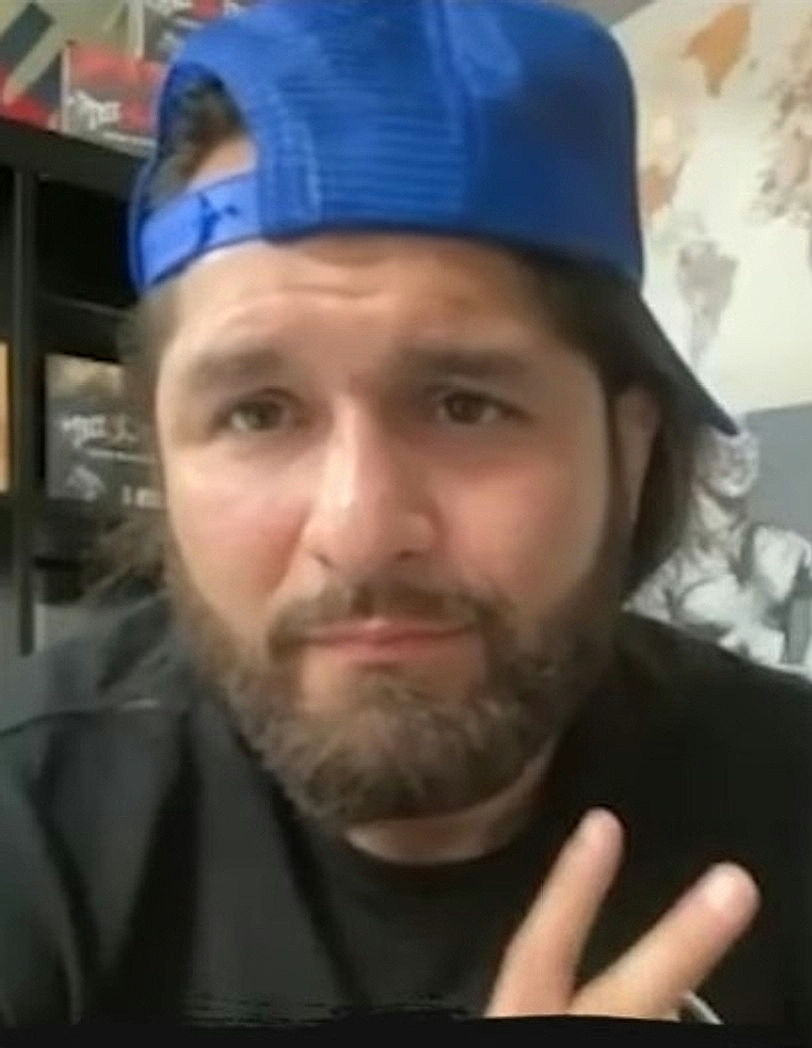
- Masvidal in 2023
- Born: Jorge Luis Masvidal; November 12, 1984 (age 42); Miami, Florida, U.S.
- Nickname: Gamebred; Street Jesus
- Height: 5 ft 11 in (1.80 m)
- Weight: 170 lb (77 kg; 12 st 2 lb)
- Division: Welterweight (2003–2004, 2006–2007, 2010, 2015–2023); Lightweight (2004–2006, 2007–2015)
- Reach: 74 in (188 cm)
- Fighting out of: Miami, Florida, U.S.
- Team: Young Tigers; American Top Team (2007–2023)
- Years active: 2003–2023 (MMA); 2005, 2024–present (boxing)

Professional boxing record
- Total: 2
- Wins: 1
- Losses: 1

Kickboxing record
- Total: 1
- Wins: 1

Mixed martial arts record
- Total: 52
- Wins: 35
- By knockout: 16
- By submission: 2
- By decision: 17
- Losses: 17
- By knockout: 2
- By submission: 2
- By decision: 13

Other information
- Boxing record from BoxRec
- Mixed martial arts record from Sherdog

Jorge Luis Masvidal (born November 12, 1984) is an American professional boxer and former professional mixed martial artist who competed in the Welterweight and Lightweight divisions. He competed professionally for 20 years from 2003 until 2023, having fought in the Ultimate Fighting Championship (UFC), Bellator, Strikeforce, Shark Fights, and World Victory Road. Masvidal holds the record for the fastest knockout in UFC history at five seconds, and won the symbolic UFC "BMF" title.

== Early life ==
Masvidal was born and raised in Miami, to a Cuban father and Peruvian mother. According to Masvidal, his father left Cuba in a self-made raft when he was young, ending up in the Virgin Islands. Masvidal was often involved in street fighting from a young age. There are videos on YouTube of his fights defeating Kimbo Slice's protégé "Ray". Masvidal was first interested in wrestling in high school, but was not eligible because of his grades. He then began training in karate and mixed martial arts.

== Mixed martial arts career ==
=== Early career ===
Masvidal won his mixed martial arts debut by knockout on May 24, 2003, at HOOKnSHOOT: Absolute Fighting Championships 3. He fought in the main event of the Absolute Fighting Championships XII event held on April 30, against current UFC competitor and The Ultimate Fighter 5 contestant Joe Lauzon. Masvidal won via technical knockout in the second round.

Masvidal garnered a 3–0 record in the now-defunct BodogFIGHT promotion, including decision victories over Keith Wisniewski, Steve Berger, and a head-kick knockout of PRIDE Fighting Championships and UFC veteran Yves Edwards.

=== Bellator ===
Masvidal was signed by Bellator and entered their lightweight tournament in April 2009. Masvidal won his first fight against Nick Agallar at Bellator 1 via TKO in the first round. However, he was defeated in the semifinals by Toby Imada at Bellator 5, who won via inverted triangle choke submission in the third round. This upset loss was acknowledged as Submission of the Year by several prominent MMA media outlets, like Sherdog, MMA Fighting and World MMA Awards.

Masvidal faced and defeated Eric Reynolds at Bellator 12 in a 160 lb. catchweight bout via rear-naked choke submission. He was rumored to be fighting again but was released by the organization.

=== Post-Bellator ===
Masvidal moved up to the welterweight division to fight Paul Daley at Shark Fights 13 in Amarillo, Texas in September 2010. The bout was later made a catchweight of 171.75 lbs. after Daley failed to make weight, simultaneously forfeiting 10 percent of his show purse to Masvidal. Daley defeated Masvidal via unanimous decision. After this performance, Masvidal signed with Strikeforce.

=== Strikeforce ===
Masvidal returned to Strikeforce in early 2011, facing Billy Evangelista at Strikeforce: Feijao vs. Henderson. He won the fight via unanimous decision.

Masvidal then fought former Elite XC Lightweight Champion K. J. Noons in a number one contender's bout. Despite knocking Noons down and almost finishing him in the first round, Masvidal went on to win via unanimous decision.

Masvidal faced Gilbert Melendez for the Strikeforce Lightweight Championship at Strikeforce: Melendez vs. Masvidal on December 17, 2011, at the Valley View Casino Center in San Diego, CA. He lost the fight via unanimous decision.

Following the championship bout, Masvidal fought Justin Wilcox at Strikeforce: Rockhold vs. Kennedy on July 14, 2012. He won the fight via split decision (29–28, 28–29, and 30–27).

Masvidal was expected to face Bobby Green on November 3, 2012, at Strikeforce: Cormier vs. Mir, but the bout was canceled along with the event itself.

Replacing injured Gilbert Melendez, Masvidal was expected to face Pat Healy at Strikeforce: Marquardt vs. Saffiedine. However, he in turn had to pull out due to a back injury and was replaced by Kurt Holobaugh.

=== Ultimate Fighting Championship ===
==== 2013 ====
Following the dissolution of Strikeforce in January 2013, Masvidal was brought over to the UFC. He made his debut against Tim Means on April 20, 2013, at UFC on Fox 7. Masvidal was successful in his debut, winning the fight via unanimous decision.

For his second bout with the promotion, Masvidal made a quick return to the Octagon as he replaced Reza Madadi in a fight against Michael Chiesa on July 27, 2013, at UFC on Fox 8. Despite being dropped in the first round by punches, Masvidal took control in the second round and won via submission.

For his third UFC bout, Masvidal faced Rustam Khabilov on November 6, 2013, at UFC: Fight for the Troops 3. He lost the back-and-forth fight via unanimous decision. Despite the loss, the bout earned Masvidal his first Fight of the Night bonus award.

==== 2014 ====
Masvidal fought longtime veteran Pat Healy at UFC on Fox 11. He won the fight via unanimous decision (30–27, 30–27, 29–28).

Masvidal faced Daron Cruickshank on July 26, 2014, at UFC on Fox 12. After being dropped by a punch in the first round, Masvidal recovered and won the fight via unanimous decision (29–28, 29–28, and 29–27).

A bout with Bobby Green, first scheduled under the Strikeforce banner in 2012 before being scrapped, was expected to take place on September 27, 2014, at UFC 178. However, on August 14, the UFC announced that Masvidal would instead face James Krause. After knocking Krause down in the second round, Masvidal won the fight via unanimous decision (30–27, 29–28, 30–27).

==== 2015 ====
Masvidal was expected to face Norman Parke on January 18, 2015, at UFC Fight Night 59. However, Masvidal pulled out of the bout citing an injury and was replaced by Gleison Tibau.

Masvidal was briefly linked to a bout with Bobby Green on April 4, 2015, at UFC Fight Night 63. However, shortly after the fight was announced by the UFC, Green pulled out of the bout citing an injury and was replaced by Benson Henderson. In turn, Henderson was removed from the bout to serve as event headliner at UFC Fight Night 60. Masvidal eventually faced Al Iaquinta at the event. He lost the bout in a closely contested split decision. 13 of 15 media outlets scored the bout in favor of Masvidal.

Masvidal faced Cezar Ferreira in a welterweight bout on July 12, 2015, at The Ultimate Fighter 21 Finale. He won the fight via knockout in the first round, also earning a Performance of the Night bonus.

Masvidal was expected to face Dong Hyun Kim on November 28, 2015, at UFC Fight Night 79. However, on November 14, it was announced that Masvidal would instead face Benson Henderson at the event after his scheduled opponent Thiago Alves pulled out of their fight. Masvidal lost the back-and-forth fight via split decision.

==== 2016 ====
Masvidal faced Lorenz Larkin on May 29, 2016, at UFC Fight Night 88. He lost the back-and-forth fight via split decision.

Masvidal was expected to face Siyar Bahadurzada on July 30, 2016, at UFC 201. However, Bahadurzada pulled out of the bout on July 12 citing an illness and was replaced by Ross Pearson. After knocking Pearson down and almost finishing him in the second round, Masvidal won the fight via unanimous decision.

Masvidal was briefly linked to a bout with Kelvin Gastelum on November 5, 2016, at The Ultimate Fighter Latin America 3 Finale. However, on September 14, Gastelum was removed in favor of a fight against former lightweight title challenger Donald Cerrone at UFC 205, one week later. Subsequently, Masvidal was removed from the card entirely and instead faced Jake Ellenberger the following month at The Ultimate Fighter 24 Finale. He went on to defeat Ellenberger in the first round via TKO. It was ruled a TKO after Ellenberger's toe was caught in the fence and the referee called a stop to the action resulting in the end of the fight.

==== 2017 ====
Masvidal faced Donald Cerrone on January 28, 2017, at UFC on Fox 23. He dropped Cerrone and nearly finished the fight in the last seconds of the first round, and eventually won the fight via TKO in the second round after scoring another knockdown. The win also earned Masvidal his second Performance of the Night bonus.

Masvidal faced off against Demian Maia at UFC 211 on May 13, 2017. Masvidal lost the fight via split decision.

Masvidal faced Stephen Thompson on November 4, 2017, at UFC 217. He lost the one-sided fight via unanimous decision.

==== 2019 ====
After a 16–month layoff, Masvidal faced Darren Till on March 16, 2019, in the main event at UFC Fight Night 147. Although dropped in the first round, he went on to win the fight via knockout in the second round. The win also earned Masvidal his second Fight of the Night and third Performance of the Night bonus awards.

Masvidal faced Ben Askren on July 6, 2019, at UFC 239. Both fighters rushed in immediately with Masvidal catching Askren with a flying knee as he attempted a takedown, winning the fight via knockout 5 seconds into round one. The knockout was the fastest knockout in UFC history, breaking the record set by Duane Ludwig. This win earned him the Performance of the Night award, and it earned him the 2019 Knockout of the Year by multiple MMA media outlets. Subsequently, Masvidal signed a new, eight-fight contract with the UFC.

Masvidal faced Nate Diaz on November 2, 2019, in the main event at UFC 244. In a unique situation, UFC President Dana White confirmed that the headlining bout was for a celebratory "Baddest Motherfucker" (‘BMF’) belt. After dominating most of the fight, Masvidal won the fight via TKO due to the doctor stoppage between rounds three and four when the cageside physician determined a cut over Diaz's right eye rendered him unable to continue. Although the decision was controversial among fight fans, Brian Suttere, a Mayo Clinic-affiliated physician, agreed with the decision.

==== 2020 ====
On 5 July 2020, it was reported that Masvidal had stepped in on less than a week's notice to face Kamaru Usman for the UFC Welterweight Championship at UFC 251, replacing original challenger Gilbert Burns, who had tested positive for COVID-19 on 3 July 2020. Prior to the fight, he signed a new, multi-fight contract with the UFC. Masvidal lost the fight via unanimous judges' decision, scored 50–45, 50-45 and 49–46.

==== 2021 ====
Masvidal faced Kamaru Usman in a rematch for the UFC Welterweight Championship on April 24, 2021, at UFC 261. Masvidal lost the fight via knockout in round two, marking his first stoppage loss inside the UFC.

Masvidal was scheduled to face Leon Edwards on December 11, 2021, at UFC 269. However, Masvidal withdrew due to injury, and the bout was scrapped.

==== 2022 ====
Masvidal faced Colby Covington on March 5, 2022, at UFC 272. He lost the fight via unanimous decision. This fight earned him the Fight of the Night award.

==== 2023 ====
Retirement
Masvidal faced Gilbert Burns on April 8, 2023, at UFC 287. He lost the fight via unanimous decision and subsequently announced his retirement from competition during the post-fight interview.

== Boxing career ==
=== Masvidal vs. Diaz ===
On March 13, 2024, it was announced that Masvidal would face Nate Diaz on June 1 at the Kia Forum in Los Angeles, California in a 10-round boxing bout at light heavyweight. On May 7, it was reported that the fight was rescheduled for July 6 at Honda Center in Anaheim, CA. On May 13, the new fight date was confirmed to be July 6. Masvidal lost the bout by majority decision.

== Professional grappling career ==
Masvidal was scheduled to face Sharabutdin Magomedov in a submission grappling match at Hype Fighting: Brazil on March 11, 2026. Before the match, Masvidal withdrew for undisclosed reasons and was replaced by Edson Barboza.

== Professional wrestling ==
Masvidal made his debut for the wrestling promotion All Elite Wrestling (AEW) at AEW Grand Slam on September 24, 2021, alongside American Top Team, and attacked Chris Jericho and Jake Hager.

== Business interests ==
In 2020, Masvidal launched a mezcal brand, El Recuerdo de Oaxaca Joven, through a partnership with Recuerdo Mezcal.

In April 2021, Masvidal announced he was launching a bare-knuckle MMA promotion, Gamebred Fighting Championship. The promotion held its inaugural pay-per-view event on June 18, 2021, in Biloxi, Mississippi.

In January 2022, Masvidal launched another MMA promotion, iKON FC, which would feature both UFC veterans and up-and-coming fighters. The promotion's inaugural event aired on UFC Fight Pass on January 21, 2022.

== Legal issues ==
On March 21, 2022, Masvidal physically attacked UFC rival Colby Covington, whom he had been defeated by at UFC 272 a few weeks prior. As Covington was leaving a restaurant, Masvidal reportedly ran up to Covington and punched him twice, fracturing one of Covington's teeth and causing an abrasion on his wrist. Masvidal was arrested two days after the incident and charged with aggravated battery resulting in great bodily harm and one count of criminal mischief. Masvidal surrendered to Miami Beach police and was detained at Turner Guilford Knight Correctional Center on a $15,000 bond; he was later conditionally released.

Masvidal pleaded not guilty to the charges on April 21, 2022. At his arraignment on April 28, Masvidal was issued a stay away order and the aggravated battery charges were updated after Covington said he suffered a brain injury from the attack. The hearings and trials were postponed thrice due to joint continuances until May 2023.

On November 6, 2023, Masvidal pleaded guilty to a misdemeanor battery charge in a Miami-Dade County court, following a plea agreement that resulted in the dismissal of two felony charges stemming the altercation with Covington outside a Miami restaurant in March 2022. Masvidal received a sentence equivalent to time already served and was ordered to pay court costs. The resolution of this case concluded a legal chapter for Masvidal, who could have faced significant prison time and fines if convicted of the original felony charges.

== Championships and accomplishments ==
=== Mixed martial arts ===
- Ultimate Fighting Championship
  - UFC 'BMF' title (One time, First)
  - Fight of the Night (Three times) vs. Rustam Khabilov, Colby Covington and Darren Till
  - Performance of the Night (Four times) vs. Cezar Ferreira, Donald Cerrone, Darren Till, and Ben Askren
  - Fastest knockout & finish in UFC history (5 seconds) (vs. Ben Askren at UFC 239)
  - UFC Honors Awards
    - 2019: President's Choice Performance of the Year Winner vs. Ben Askren & Fan's Choice Knockout of the Year Winner vs. Ben Askren
  - UFC.com Awards
    - 2019: Knockout of the Year vs. Ben Askren, Ranked #6 Knockout of the Year vs. Darren Till & Top 10 Fighter of the Year
- Absolute Fighting Championships
  - AFC Welterweight Championship
- ESPN
  - 2019 Male Fighter of the Year
  - 2019 Knockout of the Year vs. Ben Askren at UFC 239
  - 2019 Comeback of the Year
  - 2019 Most Improved Fighter of the Year
  - 2019 Story of the Year: The Resurrection of Jorge Masvidal
- MMA Junkie
  - 2019 July Knockout of the Month vs. Ben Askren
  - 2019 November Fight of the Month vs. Nate Diaz
  - 2019 Knockout of the Year vs. Ben Askren
  - 2019 Breakthrough Fighter of the Year
- MMA Fighting
  - 2019 Knockout of the Year vs. Ben Askren
- Combat Press
  - 2019 Knockout of the Year vs. Ben Askren
  - 2019 Comeback Fighter of the Year
- Cageside Press
  - 2019 Knockout of the Year vs. Ben Askren
- MMA Mania
  - 2019 Knockout of the Year vs. Ben Askren
- Wrestling Observer Newsletter
  - Mixed Martial Arts Most Valuable (2019)
- World MMA Awards
  - 2019 – July 2020 Breakthrough Fighter of the Year
  - 2019 – July 2020 Knockout of the Year vs. Ben Askren at UFC 239
- Yahoo Sports
  - 2019 Male Fighter of the Year
- Bleacher Report
  - 2019 Knockout of the Year vs. Ben Askren at UFC 239
  - 2019 Story of the Year: Jorge Masvidal's Amazing Mid-30s Comeback
- Bloody Elbow
  - 2019 Fighter of the Year
  - 2019 Knockout of the Year vs. Ben Askren at 239
- CBS Sports
  - 2019 UFC Fighter of the Year
  - 2019 UFC Knockout of the Year vs. Ben Askren
- MMA Sucka
  - 2019 Comeback Fighter of the Year
  - 2019 Knockout of the Year vs. Ben Askren
- LowKick MMA
  - 2019 Fighter of the Year
  - 2019 Breakout Fighter of the Year
  - 2019 Comeback Fighter of the Year
  - 2019 Knockout of the Year vs. Ben Askren at UFC 239

== Mixed martial arts record ==
Professional record breakdown
| 52 matches | 35 wins | 17 losses |
| By knockout | 16 | 2 |
| By submission | 2 | 2 |
| By decision | 17 | 13 |

| Res. | Record | Opponent | Method | Event | Date | Round | Time | Location | Notes |
|---|---|---|---|---|---|---|---|---|---|
| Loss | 35–17 | Gilbert Burns | Decision (unanimous) | UFC 287 | April 8, 2023 | 3 | 5:00 | Miami, Florida, United States | |
| Loss | 35–16 | Colby Covington | Decision (unanimous) | UFC 272 | March 5, 2022 | 5 | 5:00 | Las Vegas, Nevada, United States | Fight of the Night. |
| Loss | 35–15 | Kamaru Usman | KO (punch) | UFC 261 | April 24, 2021 | 2 | 1:02 | Jacksonville, Florida, United States | For the UFC Welterweight Championship. |
| Loss | 35–14 | Kamaru Usman | Decision (unanimous) | UFC 251 | July 12, 2020 | 5 | 5:00 | Abu Dhabi, United Arab Emirates | For the UFC Welterweight Championship. |
| Win | 35–13 | Nate Diaz | TKO (doctor stoppage) | UFC 244 | November 2, 2019 | 3 | 5:00 | New York City, New York, United States | Won the symbolic UFC "BMF" title. |
| Win | 34–13 | Ben Askren | KO (flying knee) | UFC 239 | July 6, 2019 | 1 | 0:05 | Las Vegas, Nevada, United States | Fastest knockout in UFC history. Performance of the Night. |
| Win | 33–13 | Darren Till | KO (punches) | UFC Fight Night: Till vs. Masvidal | March 16, 2019 | 2 | 3:05 | London, England | Performance of the Night. Fight of the Night. |
| Loss | 32–13 | Stephen Thompson | Decision (unanimous) | UFC 217 | November 4, 2017 | 3 | 5:00 | New York City, New York, United States | |
| Loss | 32–12 | Demian Maia | Decision (split) | UFC 211 | May 13, 2017 | 3 | 5:00 | Dallas, Texas, United States | UFC Welterweight title eliminator. |
| Win | 32–11 | Donald Cerrone | TKO (punches) | UFC on Fox: Shevchenko vs. Peña | January 28, 2017 | 2 | 1:00 | Denver, Colorado, United States | Performance of the Night. |
| Win | 31–11 | Jake Ellenberger | TKO (punches) | The Ultimate Fighter: Tournament of Champions Finale | December 3, 2016 | 1 | 4:05 | Las Vegas, Nevada, United States | |
| Win | 30–11 | Ross Pearson | Decision (unanimous) | UFC 201 | July 30, 2016 | 3 | 5:00 | Atlanta, Georgia, United States | |
| Loss | 29–11 | Lorenz Larkin | Decision (split) | UFC Fight Night: Almeida vs. Garbrandt | May 29, 2016 | 3 | 5:00 | Las Vegas, Nevada, United States | |
| Loss | 29–10 | Benson Henderson | Decision (split) | UFC Fight Night: Henderson vs. Masvidal | November 28, 2015 | 5 | 5:00 | Seoul, South Korea | |
| Win | 29–9 | Cezar Ferreira | KO (elbows and punches) | The Ultimate Fighter: American Top Team vs. Blackzilians Finale | July 12, 2015 | 1 | 4:22 | Las Vegas, Nevada, United States | Return to Welterweight. Performance of the Night. |
| Loss | 28–9 | Al Iaquinta | Decision (split) | UFC Fight Night: Mendes vs. Lamas | April 4, 2015 | 3 | 5:00 | Fairfax, Virginia, United States | |
| Win | 28–8 | James Krause | Decision (unanimous) | UFC 178 | September 27, 2014 | 3 | 5:00 | Las Vegas, Nevada, United States | |
| Win | 27–8 | Daron Cruickshank | Decision (unanimous) | UFC on Fox: Lawler vs. Brown | July 26, 2014 | 3 | 5:00 | San Jose, California, United States | |
| Win | 26–8 | Pat Healy | Decision (unanimous) | UFC on Fox: Werdum vs. Browne | April 19, 2014 | 3 | 5:00 | Orlando, Florida, United States | |
| Loss | 25–8 | Rustam Khabilov | Decision (unanimous) | UFC: Fight for the Troops 3 | November 6, 2013 | 3 | 5:00 | Fort Campbell, Kentucky, United States | Fight of the Night. |
| Win | 25–7 | Michael Chiesa | Submission (brabo choke) | UFC on Fox: Johnson vs. Moraga | July 27, 2013 | 2 | 4:59 | Seattle, Washington, United States | |
| Win | 24–7 | Tim Means | Decision (unanimous) | UFC on Fox: Henderson vs. Melendez | April 20, 2013 | 3 | 5:00 | San Jose, California, United States | |
| Win | 23–7 | Justin Wilcox | Decision (split) | Strikeforce: Rockhold vs. Kennedy | July 14, 2012 | 3 | 5:00 | Portland, Oregon, United States | |
| Loss | 22–7 | Gilbert Melendez | Decision (unanimous) | Strikeforce: Melendez vs. Masvidal | December 17, 2011 | 5 | 5:00 | San Diego, California, United States | For the Strikeforce Lightweight Championship. |
| Win | 22–6 | K. J. Noons | Decision (unanimous) | Strikeforce: Overeem vs. Werdum | June 18, 2011 | 3 | 5:00 | Dallas, Texas, United States | Strikeforce Lightweight title eliminator. |
| Win | 21–6 | Billy Evangelista | Decision (unanimous) | Strikeforce: Feijao vs. Henderson | March 5, 2011 | 3 | 5:00 | Columbus, Ohio, United States | |
| Loss | 20–6 | Paul Daley | Decision (unanimous) | Shark Fights 13 | September 11, 2010 | 3 | 5:00 | Amarillo, Texas, United States | Welterweight bout; Daley missed weight (172 lb). |
| Win | 20–5 | Naoyuki Kotani | Decision (split) | Astra: Yoshida's Farewell | April 25, 2010 | 3 | 5:00 | Tokyo, Japan | |
| Loss | 19–5 | Luis Palomino | Decision (split) | G-Force Fights: Bad Blood 3 | April 2, 2010 | 3 | 5:00 | Miami, Florida, United States | |
| Win | 19–4 | Satoru Kitaoka | KO (punches) | Sengoku 11 | November 7, 2009 | 2 | 3:03 | Tokyo, Japan | |
| Win | 18–4 | Eric Reynolds | Submission (rear-naked choke) | Bellator 12 | June 19, 2009 | 3 | 3:33 | Hollywood, Florida, United States | Catchweight (160 lb) bout. |
| Loss | 17–4 | Toby Imada | Technical Submission (inverted triangle choke) | Bellator 5 | May 1, 2009 | 3 | 3:22 | Dayton, Ohio, United States | Bellator Season One Lightweight Tournament Semifinal. |
| Win | 17–3 | Nick Agallar | TKO (punches) | Bellator 1 | April 3, 2009 | 1 | 1:19 | Hollywood, Florida, United States | Bellator Season One Lightweight Tournament Quarterfinal; Masvidal missed weight (156.5 lb). |
| Win | 16–3 | Bang Tae-hyun | Decision (unanimous) | Sengoku 6 | November 1, 2008 | 3 | 5:00 | Saitama, Japan | 2008 Sengoku Lightweight Grand Prix Alternate bout. |
| Win | 15–3 | Ryan Schultz | TKO (punches) | Sengoku 5 | September 28, 2008 | 1 | 1:57 | Tokyo, Japan | 2008 Sengoku Lightweight Grand Prix Alternate bout. |
| Loss | 14–3 | Rodrigo Damm | TKO (punch) | Sengoku 3 | June 8, 2008 | 2 | 4:38 | Saitama, Japan | |
| Win | 14–2 | Ryan Healy | Decision (unanimous) | Strikeforce: At the Dome | February 23, 2008 | 3 | 5:00 | Tacoma, Washington, United States | Catchweight (160 lb) bout. |
| Win | 13–2 | Brant Rose | TKO (punches) | Crazy Horse Fights 1 | December 11, 2007 | 1 | 0:56 | Fort Lauderdale, Florida, United States | |
| Win | 12–2 | Matt Lee | TKO (elbows and punches) | Strikeforce: Playboy Mansion | September 29, 2007 | 1 | 1:33 | Los Angeles, California, United States | Catchweight (160 lb) bout. |
| Win | 11–2 | Yves Edwards | KO (head kick) | BodogFight: Alvarez vs. Lee | July 14, 2007 | 2 | 2:59 | Trenton, New Jersey, United States | Return to Lightweight. |
| Win | 10–2 | Steve Berger | Decision (unanimous) | BodogFight: Clash of the Nation | December 15, 2006 | 3 | 5:00 | Saint Petersburg, Russia | |
| Win | 9–2 | Keith Wisniewski | Decision (majority) | BodogFight: To the Brink of War | August 22, 2006 | 3 | 5:00 | San José, Costa Rica | |
| Win | 8–2 | Nuri Shakir | Decision (unanimous) | Absolute FC 17 | June 24, 2006 | 3 | 5:00 | Fort Lauderdale, Florida, United States | Won the vacant Absolute FC Welterweight Championship. |
| Win | 7–2 | David Gardner | TKO (punches) | Absolute FC 15 | February 18, 2006 | 2 | 0:14 | Fort Lauderdale, Florida, United States | Return to Welterweight. |
| Loss | 6–2 | Paul Rodriguez | Technical submission (rear-naked choke) | Absolute FC 13 | July 30, 2005 | 1 | 2:27 | Fort Lauderdale, Florida, United States | |
| Win | 6–1 | Joe Lauzon | TKO (punches) | Absolute FC 12 | April 30, 2005 | 2 | 3:57 | Fort Lauderdale, Florida, United States | |
| Loss | 5–1 | Raphael Assunção | Decision (unanimous) | Full Throttle 1 | April 21, 2005 | 3 | 5:00 | Duluth, Georgia, United States | |
| Win | 5–0 | Justin Wisniewski | Decision (majority) | Absolute FC 8 | May 1, 2004 | 2 | 5:00 | Fort Lauderdale, Florida, United States | Lightweight debut. |
| Win | 4–0 | Julian Ortega | Decision (unanimous) | Absolute FC 6 | December 3, 2003 | 2 | 5:00 | Fort Lauderdale, Florida, United States | |
| Win | 3–0 | Rolando Delgado | TKO (punches) | Absolute FC 5 | September 5, 2003 | 2 | 2:14 | Fort Lauderdale, Florida, United States | |
| Win | 2–0 | Brian Geraghty | Decision (unanimous) | Absolute FC 4 | July 19, 2003 | 2 | 5:00 | Fort Lauderdale, Florida, United States | |
| Win | 1–0 | Brandon Bledsoe | KO (punches) | Absolute FC 3 | May 24, 2003 | 1 | 3:55 | Fort Lauderdale, Florida, United States | Welterweight debut. |

== Professional boxing record ==
| 2 fights | 1 win | 1 loss |
|---|---|---|
| By decision | 1 | 1 |

| No. | Result | Record | Opponent | Type | Round, time | Date | Location | Notes |
|---|---|---|---|---|---|---|---|---|
| 2 | Loss | 1–1 | Nate Diaz | MD | 10 | Jul 6, 2024 | Honda Center, Anaheim, California, U.S. | |
| 1 | Win | 1–0 | Joseph Benjamin | MD | 4 | Jun 28, 2005 | Radisson Mart Plaza Hotel, Miami, Florida, U.S. | |

== Pay-per-view bouts ==
| Event | Fight | Date | Venue | City | PPV buys |
|---|---|---|---|---|---|
| UFC 244 | Masvidal vs Diaz | November 2, 2019 | Madison Square Garden | New York City, New York, U.S | Not Disclosed |
| UFC 251 | Usman vs. Masvidal | July 12, 2020 | Flash Forum | Abu Dhabi, United Arab Emirates | 1,300,000 |
| UFC 261 | Usman vs. Masvidal 2 | April 24, 2021 | VyStar Veterans Memorial Arena | Jacksonville, Florida, U.S. | 700,000 |
| UFC 272 | Covington vs Masvidal | March 5, 2022 | T-Mobile Arena | Paradise, Nevada, U.S | Not Disclosed |

== See also ==
- List of male boxers
- List of male mixed martial artists
- List of mixed martial artists with professional boxing records
- List of multi-sport athletes
- List of Strikeforce alumni
- List of UFC records

Awards and achievements
| New championship | 1st UFC BMF Champion; November 2, 2019 – May 16, 2023; Stripped | Vacant Title next held by Justin Gaethje |
