= Johnny Walker (fighter) =

Brazilian mixed martial artist (born 1992)

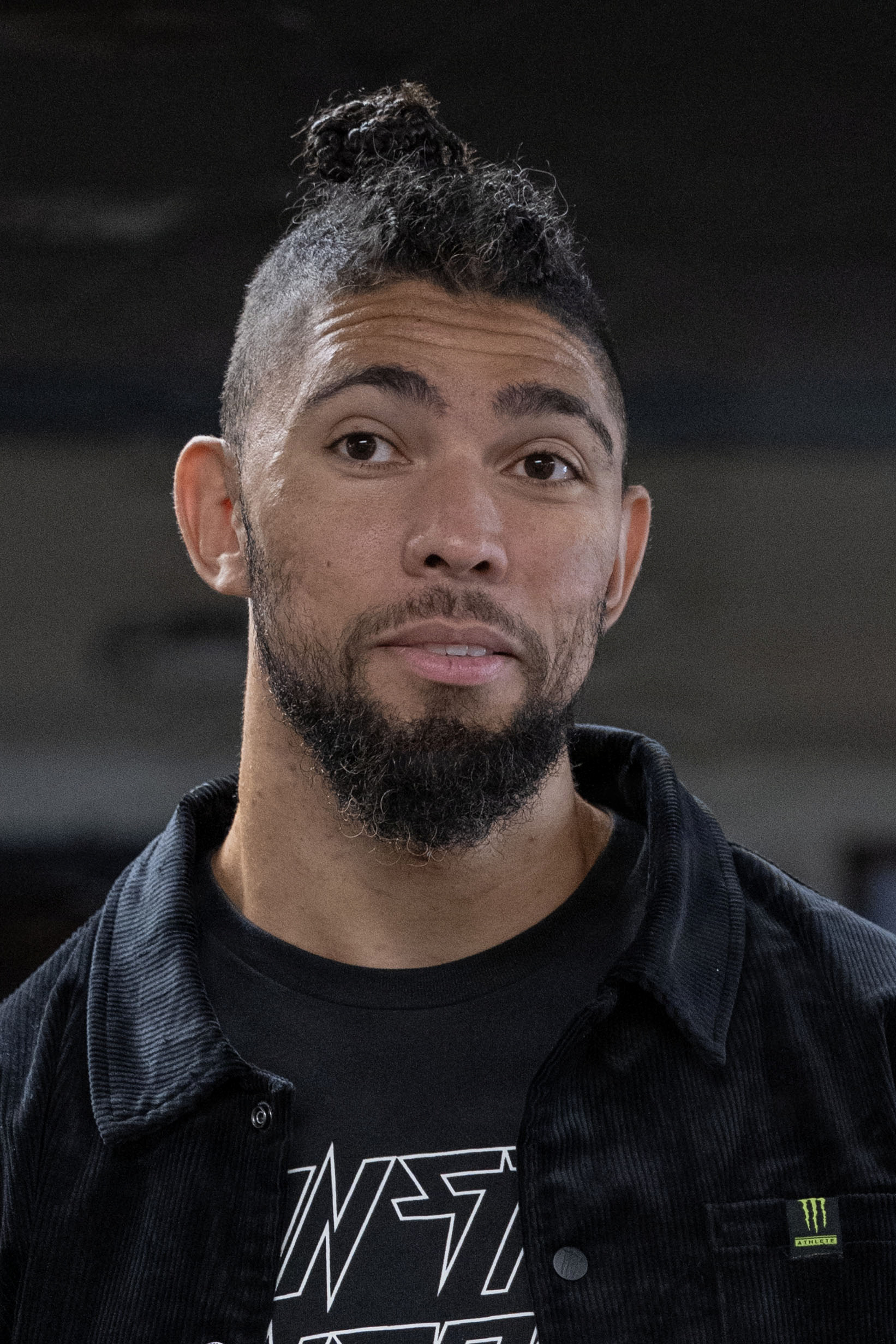
- Walker in 2026
- Born: Walker Johnny Silva Barra de Souza; March 30, 1992 (age 34); Belford Roxo, Rio de Janeiro, Brazil
- Height: 6 ft 5 in (1.96 m)
- Weight: 242 lb (110 kg; 17.3 st)
- Division: Light Heavyweight (2013–2015, 2017–2026); Heavyweight (2015–2016, 2018, 2026–present)
- Reach: 82 in (208 cm)
- Fighting out of: Las Vegas, Nevada, U.S.
- Team: Tristar Gym (2020); SBG Ireland (2020–2024); Xtreme Couture (2025–present)
- Rank: Brown belt in Brazilian Jiu-Jitsu
- Years active: 2013–present

Mixed martial arts record
- Total: 35
- Wins: 24
- By knockout: 19
- By submission: 3
- By decision: 2
- Losses: 10
- By knockout: 6
- By submission: 1
- By decision: 3
- No contests: 1

Other information
- Mixed martial arts record from Sherdog

Walker Johnny Silva Barra de Souza (born March 30, 1992), known as Johnny Walker, is a Brazilian professional mixed martial artist. He currently competes in the Heavyweight division of the Ultimate Fighting Championship (UFC). A professional since 2013, Walker gained entrance into the UFC by competing on Dana White's Contender Series at Light Heavyweight and also previously competed for Jungle Fight in his native Brazil. As of November 7, 2026, he is #8 in the Meta UFC heavyweight rankings.

== Mixed martial arts career ==
=== Early career ===
Walker made his professional MMA debut in December 2013. Over the next four years, he fought in his native Brazil and earned a record of ten wins against three losses with all of his wins coming via stoppages.

Walker ended up receiving an offer from a Scottish businessman to train there and moved to Scotland. However, after a month he received no pay and left. In early 2018, Walker made the move to England where he fought for various promotions and added 3 more wins to his record and earned a spot on Dana White's Contender Series in August 2018. Although from Brazil, Walker chose to represent England as he felt that is where he was able to reach his potential.

=== Dana White's Contender Series ===
Walker made his Dana White's Contender Series debut on August 11, 2018. He faced Henrique da Silva and won the fight via unanimous decision. The win earned Walker a spot on the UFC's roster.

=== Ultimate Fighting Championship ===
In his UFC promotional debut, Walker faced Khalil Rountree Jr. on November 17, 2018, at UFC Fight Night 140. He won the fight via knockout in the first round. The win earned Walker his first Performance of the Night bonus award.

In his next fight, Walker faced Justin Ledet on February 2, 2019, at UFC Fight Night 144. He won the fight via knockout just 15 seconds into the first round. The win earned Walker his second consecutive Performance of the Night bonus award.

In a quick turnaround, Walker replaced an injured Ovince Saint Preux to face Misha Cirkunov on March 2, 2019, at UFC 235. He won the fight via TKO in the first round. Post-fight, Walker stated he dislocated his shoulder during his celebration. The win also earned Walker his third consecutive Performance of the Night bonus award.

Walker faced Corey Anderson on November 2, 2019, at UFC 244. He lost the fight via technical knockout in the first round.

Walker faced Nikita Krylov on March 14, 2020, at UFC Fight Night 170. He lost the fight via unanimous decision.

Walker was initially scheduled to face Ryan Spann at UFC Fight Night 176 on September 5, 2020. However, Walker tested positive for COVID-19 and the bout was postponed to September 19, 2020, at UFC Fight Night 178. After being knocked down twice by Spann, Walker won the fight by knockout in the first round.

Walker was scheduled to face Jimmy Crute on March 27, 2021, at UFC 260. However, Walker pulled out of the fight in early February citing a chest injury.

Walker faced Thiago Santos on October 2, 2021, at UFC Fight Night 193. He lost the fight via unanimous decision.

As the first bout of his new six-fight contract, Walker faced Jamahal Hill on February 19, 2022, in the main event at UFC Fight Night 201. He lost the fight via knockout in the first round.

Walker faced Ion Cuțelaba on September 10, 2022, at UFC 279. He won the fight via a rear-naked choke submission in the first round. This win earned Walker his fourth Performance of the Night bonus award.

Walker faced Paul Craig on January 21, 2023, at UFC 283. He won the fight via technical knockout in the first round.

Walker faced Anthony Smith on May 13, 2023, at UFC on ABC 4. He won the bout via unanimous decision.

Walker faced Magomed Ankalaev at UFC 294 on October 21, 2023. The fight ended in a no-contest after an illegal knee by Ankalaev, as the cage-side doctor controversially deemed Walker was unable to continue the fight. Due to the controversial ending, the bout with Ankalaev was rebooked for the main event at UFC Fight Night 234 on January 13, 2024. Walker lost the fight via knockout in the second round.

Walker faced Volkan Oezdemir on June 22, 2024, at UFC on ABC 6. He lost the fight by knockout in the first round.

Walker was scheduled to face Bogdan Guskov on January 18, 2025 at UFC 311. However, Walker withdrew from the fight due to an injury and was replaced by promotional newcomer Billy Elekana.

Walker was scheduled to face Azamat Murzakanov on May 17, 2025 at UFC Fight Night 256. However, for unknown reasons, the bout was moved to June 7, 2025 at UFC 316. In turn, Walker pulled out in early May due to injury and was replaced by Brendson Ribeiro.

Walker faced Zhang Mingyang on August 23, 2025 in the main event at UFC Fight Night 257. He won the fight by technical knockout via leg kicks and punches in the second round. This fight earned him another Performance of the Night award.

Walker faced Dominick Reyes on April 11, 2026 at UFC 327. He lost the fight by split decision. 5 out of 16 media outlets scored the contest for Walker.

=== Move to Heavyweight ===
Walker was scheduled to make his debut in the heavyweight division against Ante Delija at UFC Fight Night 283. However, Delija pulled out due to injury and after a replacement was unsuccessfully sought, the bout was cancelled.

Walker faced Mick Parkin on October 3, 2026 at UFC 332. He won the fight by knockout via a knee in the first round. This fight earned him a $100,000 Performance of the Night award.

Just over a month later, Walker faced former LFA Heavyweight Champion Waldo Cortes-Acosta on November 7, 2026 at UFC Fight Night 293, after the original welterweight main event between Sean Brady and Gabriel Bonfim was cancelled due to Brady's injury. He won the fight by technical knockout via a head kick and punches in the third round. This fight earned him a $100,000 Fight of the Night award.

== Personal life ==
He is the older half-brother of Valter Walker, a fellow UFC fighter who competes in the heavyweight division. As of 2025, he is a brand ambassador, along with his brother, through a multi-year branding deal between the UFC and Spribe.

== Championships and accomplishments ==
- Ultimate Fighting Championship
  - Fight of the Night (One time) vs. Waldo Cortes-Acosta
  - Performance of the Night (Six times) vs. Khalil Rountree Jr., Justin Ledet, Misha Cirkunov, Ion Cuțelaba, Zhang Mingyang and Mick Parkin
  - UFC.com Awards
    - 2018: Ranked #8 Newcomer of the Year
- MMAJunkie.com
  - 2019 February Knockout of the Month vs. Justin Ledet
- European Beatdown
  - 2018 EBD Light Heavyweight Championship (One time)
- Ultimate Challenge MMA
  - 2018 UCMMA Light Heavyweight Championship (One time)

== Mixed martial arts record ==
Professional record breakdown
35 matches	24 wins	10 losses
By knockout	19	6
By submission	3	1
By decision	2	3
No contests	1	

Res.	Record	Opponent	Method	Event	Date	Round	Time	Location	Notes
Win	24–10 (1)	Waldo Cortes-Acosta	TKO (punches)	UFC Fight Night: Cortes-Acosta vs. Walker	November 7, 2026	3	2:27	Las Vegas, Nevada, United States	Fight of the Night.
Win	23–10 (1)	Mick Parkin	KO (knee)	UFC 332	October 3, 2026	1	3:35	Salt Lake City, Utah, United States	Return to Heavyweight. Performance of the Night.
Loss	22–10 (1)	Dominick Reyes	Decision (split)	UFC 327	April 11, 2026	3	5:00	Miami, Florida, United States	
Win	22–9 (1)	Zhang Mingyang	TKO (leg kicks and punches)	UFC Fight Night: Walker vs. Zhang	August 23, 2025	2	2:37	Shanghai, China	Performance of the Night.
Loss	21–9 (1)	Volkan Oezdemir	KO (punch)	UFC on ABC: Whittaker vs. Aliskerov	June 22, 2024	1	2:28	Riyadh, Saudi Arabia	
Loss	21–8 (1)	Magomed Ankalaev	KO (punches)	UFC Fight Night: Ankalaev vs. Walker 2	January 13, 2024	2	2:42	Las Vegas, Nevada, United States	
NC	21–7 (1)	Magomed Ankalaev	NC (illegal knee)	UFC 294	October 21, 2023	1	3:13	Abu Dhabi, United Arab Emirates	Accidental illegal knee rendered Walker unable to continue.
Win	21–7	Anthony Smith	Decision (unanimous)	UFC on ABC: Rozenstruik vs. Almeida	May 13, 2023	3	5:00	Charlotte, North Carolina, United States	
Win	20–7	Paul Craig	TKO (punches)	UFC 283	January 21, 2023	1	2:16	Rio de Janeiro, Brazil	
Win	19–7	Ion Cuțelaba	Submission (rear-naked choke)	UFC 279	September 10, 2022	1	4:37	Las Vegas, Nevada, United States	Performance of the Night.
Loss	18–7	Jamahal Hill	KO (punch)	UFC Fight Night: Walker vs. Hill	February 19, 2022	1	2:55	Las Vegas, Nevada, United States	
Loss	18–6	Thiago Santos	Decision (unanimous)	UFC Fight Night: Santos vs. Walker	October 2, 2021	5	5:00	Las Vegas, Nevada, United States	
Win	18–5	Ryan Spann	KO (elbows and punches)	UFC Fight Night: Covington vs. Woodley	September 19, 2020	1	2:43	Las Vegas, Nevada, United States	
Loss	17–5	Nikita Krylov	Decision (unanimous)	UFC Fight Night: Lee vs. Oliveira	March 14, 2020	3	5:00	Brasília, Brazil	
Loss	17–4	Corey Anderson	TKO (punches)	UFC 244	November 2, 2019	1	2:07	New York City, New York, United States	
Win	17–3	Misha Cirkunov	TKO (flying knee and punches)	UFC 235	March 2, 2019	1	0:38	Las Vegas, Nevada, United States	Performance of the Night.
Win	16–3	Justin Ledet	TKO (spinning backfist and punches)	UFC Fight Night: Assunção vs. Moraes 2	February 2, 2019	1	0:15	Fortaleza, Brazil	Performance of the Night.
Win	15–3	Khalil Rountree Jr.	KO (elbow)	UFC Fight Night: Magny vs. Ponzinibbio	November 17, 2018	1	1:57	Buenos Aires, Argentina	Performance of the Night.
Win	14–3	Henrique da Silva	Decision (unanimous)	Dana White's Contender Series Brazil 2	August 11, 2018	3	5:00	Las Vegas, Nevada, United States	
Win	13–3	Cheick Kone	TKO (punches)	European Beatdown 3	March 17, 2018	1	3:04	Mons, Belgium	Won the EBD Light Heavyweight Championship.
Win	12–3	Jędrzej Maćkowiak	KO (knee and punches)	Krwawy Sport 1	March 11, 2018	2	2:42	Southampton, England	Heavyweight bout.
Win	11–3	Stuart Austin	KO (knee)	Ultimate Challenge MMA 54	February 10, 2018	1	2:44	London, England	Won the UCMMA Light Heavyweight Championship.
Win	10–3	Rodrigo Jesus	TKO (punches)	Brave CF 8	August 12, 2017	1	2:18	Curitiba, Brazil	
Win	9–3	Luis Guilherme de Andrade	Submission (guillotine choke)	Katana Fight: Gold Edition	March 25, 2017	1	0:29	Colombo, Brazil	Return to Light Heavyweight.
Loss	8–3	Henrique Silva Lopes	KO (punches)	Jungle Fight 88	June 25, 2016	1	0:18	Poços de Caldas, Brazil	
Win	8–2	Fábio Vasconcelos	TKO (punches)	Imortal FC 4	May 21, 2016	1	4:10	São José dos Pinhais, Brazil	
Loss	7–2	Klidson Abreu	Submission (rear-naked choke)	Samurai FC 12	October 10, 2015	2	3:10	Curitiba, Brazil	Heavyweight debut. For the vacant Samurai FC Heavyweight Championship.
Win	7–1	Murilo Grittz	TKO (punches)	PRVT: Garuva Top Fight	August 16, 2015	1	0:56	Garuva, Brazil	
Win	6–1	Marck Polimeno	Submission (rear-naked choke)	PRVT: Afonso Pena Top Fight 3	June 28, 2015	1	0:38	São José dos Pinhais, Brazil	
Win	5–1	Ricardo Pandora	TKO (punches)	Imortal FC 1	June 13, 2015	1	3:20	São José dos Pinhais, Brazil	
Win	4–1	Andrew Flores Smith	TKO (punches)	Peru FC 21	May 28, 2015	3	0:28	Lima, Peru	
Loss	3–1	Wagner Prado	TKO (punches)	Circuito Team Nogueira MMA Beach 1	November 29, 2014	2	3:40	Rio de Janeiro, Brazil	
Win	3–0	João Vitor Lopes da Silva	TKO (punches)	Gigante Fight MMA 2	October 11, 2014	1	N/A	Rio de Janeiro, Brazil	
Win	2–0	Vitor Casanova	TKO (punches)	Ubá Fight 5	September 13, 2014	1	4:38	Ubá, Brazil	
Win	1–0	Francisco Francisco	TKO (knees and punches)	Circuito Invictus de MMA 2	December 14, 2013	1	0:49	Rio de Janeiro, Brazil	Light Heavyweight debut.

== See also ==
- List of current UFC fighters
- List of Dana White's Contender Series alumni
- List of male mixed martial artists
