= UFC 235 =

UFC mixed martial arts event in 2019

UFC 235: Jones vs. Smith
- The poster for UFC 235: Jones vs. Smith
- Promotion: Ultimate Fighting Championship
- Date: March 2, 2019
- Venue: T-Mobile Arena
- City: Paradise, Nevada
- Attendance: 14,790
- Total gate: $4,035,156.50

Event chronology
UFC Fight Night: Błachowicz vs. Santos	UFC 235: Jones vs. Smith	UFC Fight Night: Lewis vs. dos Santos

UFC 235: Jones vs. Smith was a mixed martial arts event produced by the Ultimate Fighting Championship held on March 2, 2019, at T-Mobile Arena in Paradise, Nevada, part of the Las Vegas Metropolitan Area.

== Background ==
A UFC Light Heavyweight Championship bout between two-time champion Jon Jones and challenger Anthony Smith headlined the event.

A UFC Welterweight Championship bout between current champion Tyron Woodley and The Ultimate Fighter: American Top Team vs. Blackzilians welterweight winner Kamaru Usman served as the co-headliner.

As a result of the cancellation of UFC 233, a welterweight bout between former UFC Welterweight Champion Robbie Lawler and promotional newcomer and former Bellator Welterweight World Champion Ben Askren (also former ONE Welterweight Champion) was rescheduled for this event.

A women's bantamweight bout between former UFC Women's Bantamweight Champion Holly Holm and Aspen Ladd was expected to take place at the event. However, on January 31, it was reported the matchup was scrapped due to undisclosed reasons and both fighters are expected to face new opponents in other events.

Thomas Almeida was expected to face Marlon Vera at the event. Almeida pulled out of the fight on January 31 citing an injury. He was replaced by Frankie Saenz. However, the fight was cancelled entirely on February 27 when Vera pulled out of the fight due to illness.

Former interim title challenger Ovince Saint Preux was expected to face Misha Cirkunov at the event. However, on February 11, it was announced that Saint Preux suffered an injury and was pulled from the fight. He was replaced by Johnny Walker.

Song Yadong was expected to face The Ultimate Fighter: Latin America bantamweight winner Alejandro Pérez at the event, but pulled out of the bout on January 11 due to an undisclosed reason. He was replaced by Cody Stamann.

== Results ==
Main Card
Weight class				Method	Round	Time	Notes
Light Heavyweight	Jon Jones (c)	def.	Anthony Smith	Decision (unanimous) (48–44, 48–44, 48–44)	5	5:00	(Note: For the UFC Light Heavyweight Championship. Jones was deducted two points in round 4 due to an illegal knee.)
Welterweight	Kamaru Usman	def.	Tyron Woodley (c)	Decision (unanimous) (50–44, 50–44, 50–45)	5	5:00	(Note: For the UFC Welterweight Championship.)
Welterweight	Ben Askren	def.	Robbie Lawler	Technical Submission (bulldog choke)	1	3:20
Women's Strawweight	Zhang Weili	def.	Tecia Torres	Decision (unanimous) (29–28, 30–27, 30–27)	3	5:00
Bantamweight	Pedro Munhoz	def.	Cody Garbrandt	KO (punches)	1	4:51
Preliminary Card (ESPN)
Featherweight	Zabit Magomedsharipov	def.	Jeremy Stephens	Decision (unanimous) (29–28, 29–28, 29–28)	3	5:00
Light Heavyweight	Johnny Walker	def.	Misha Cirkunov	TKO (flying knee and punches)	1	0:36
Bantamweight	Cody Stamann	def.	Alejandro Pérez	Decision (unanimous) (29–28, 29–28, 30–27)	3	5:00
Welterweight	Diego Sanchez	def.	Mickey Gall	TKO (punches)	2	4:13
Early Preliminary Card (UFC Fight Pass)
Middleweight	Edmen Shahbazyan	def.	Charles Byrd	TKO (elbows and punches)	1	0:38
Women's Bantamweight	Macy Chiasson	def.	Gina Mazany	TKO (punches)	1	1:49
Women's Strawweight	Hannah Cifers	def.	Polyana Viana	Decision (split) (29–28, 28–29, 29–28)	3	5:00

== Bonus awards ==
The following fighters received $50,000 bonuses:

- Fight of the Night: Pedro Munhoz vs. Cody Garbrandt
- Performance of the Night: Johnny Walker and Diego Sanchez

== Reported payout ==
The following is the reported payout to the fighters as reported to the Nevada State Athletic Commission. It does not include sponsor money and also does not include the UFC's traditional "fight night" bonuses. The total disclosed payroll for the event was $3,334,000.

- Jon Jones: $500,000 (no win bonus) def. Anthony Smith: $350,000
- Kamaru Usman: $350,000 (no win bonus) def. Tyron Woodley: $500,000
- Ben Askren: $350,000 (includes $150,000 win bonus) def. Robbie Lawler: $200,000
- Zhang Weili: $36,000 (includes $18,000 win bonus) def. Tecia Torres: $36,000
- Pedro Munhoz: $96,000 (includes $48,000 win bonus) def. Cody Garbrandt: $130,000
- Zabit Magomedsharipov: $110,000 (includes $55,000 win bonus) def. Jeremy Stephens: $67,000
- Johnny Walker: $90,000 (includes $45,000 win bonus) def. Misha Cirkunov: $45,000
- Cody Stamann: $66,000 (includes $33,000 win bonus) def. Alejandro Pérez: $42,000
- Diego Sanchez: $198,000 (includes $99,000 win bonus) def. Mickey Gall: $30,000
- Edmen Shahbazyan: $26,000 (includes $13,000 win bonus) def. Charles Byrd: $12,000
- Macy Chiasson: $50,000 (includes $25,000 win bonus) def. Gina Mazany: $14,000
- Hannah Cifers: $24,000 (includes $12,000 win bonus) def. Polyana Viana: $12,000

== See also ==
- List of UFC events
- 2019 in UFC
- List of current UFC fighters
