= UFC 268 =

Martial arts competition in 2021

UFC 268: Usman vs. Covington 2
- The poster for UFC 268: Usman vs. Covington 2
- Promotion: Ultimate Fighting Championship
- Date: November 6, 2021
- Venue: Madison Square Garden
- City: New York City, New York, United States
- Attendance: 20,715
- Total gate: $9,800,000
- Buyrate: 700,000(US)

Event chronology
UFC 267: Błachowicz vs. Teixeira	UFC 268: Usman vs. Covington 2	UFC Fight Night: Holloway vs. Rodríguez

UFC 268: Usman vs. Covington 2 was a mixed martial arts event produced by the Ultimate Fighting Championship that took place on November 6, 2021, at Madison Square Garden in New York City, New York, United States.

== Background ==
A UFC Welterweight Championship rematch between the current champion Kamaru Usman (also The Ultimate Fighter: American Top Team vs. Blackzilians welterweight winner) and former interim champion Colby Covington headlined the event. Serving as the event headliner, they previously met at UFC 245 in December 2019, where Usman defended his title via fifth-round technical knockout. Vicente Luque served as backup and potential replacement for this fight. At the weigh-ins, Luque weighed in at 172.2 pounds, 2.2 pounds over the welterweight title fight limit making him ineligible to compete for the title.

A UFC Women's Strawweight Championship rematch between current two-time champion Rose Namajunas and former champion Zhang Weili took place as the co-main event. They previously met at UFC 261, where Namajunas won the title via first-round knockout.

A women’s bantamweight bout between former UFC Women's Featherweight Champion Germaine de Randamie and Irene Aldana was expected to take place at the event. However, de Randamie withdrew in early September due to injury.

A middleweight bout between former Strikeforce and UFC Middleweight Champion Luke Rockhold and Sean Strickland was expected to take place at the event. However on October 11, Rockhold withdrew due to a herniated disc.

Phil Hawes and Chris Curtis were expected to meet in a middleweight bout at UFC Fight Night: Dern vs. Rodriguez a month earlier, but due to Curtis being tapped as a replacement just a day before that event, Hawes declined the matchup. They met at this event.

A featherweight contest between Melsik Baghdasaryan and T.J. Laramie was scheduled for the event. However, Laramie was forced to pull out after he was diagnosed with an MRSA infection. He was replaced by promotional newcomer Bruno Souza. At the weigh-ins, Souza weighed in at 148.4 pounds, 2.4 pounds over the featherweight non-title fight limit. The bout proceeded at a catchweight and he forfeited 20% of his purse to Baghdasaryan.

A light heavyweight fight between Aleksa Camur and John Allan was scheduled for the event. However, Camur pulled out of the bout citing an undisclosed injury and was replaced by Dustin Jacoby.

At the weigh-ins, C.J. Vergara weighed in at 127.4 pounds, 1.4 pounds over the flyweight non-title fight limit. His bout proceeded at a catchweight and he forfeited 20% of his purse to his opponent Ode' Osbourne.

== Results ==
Main card
Weight class				Method	Round	Time	Notes
Welterweight	Kamaru Usman (c)	def.	Colby Covington	Decision (unanimous) (48–47, 48–47, 49–46)	5	5:00	(Note: For the UFC Welterweight Championship.)
Women's Strawweight	Rose Namajunas (c)	def.	Zhang Weili	Decision (split) (47–48, 48–47, 49–46)	5	5:00	(Note: For the UFC Women's Strawweight Championship.)
Bantamweight	Marlon Vera	def.	Frankie Edgar	KO (front kick)	3	3:50
Featherweight	Shane Burgos	def.	Billy Quarantillo	Decision (unanimous) (29–28, 29–28, 29–28)	3	5:00
Lightweight	Justin Gaethje	def.	Michael Chandler	Decision (unanimous) (29–28, 29–28, 30–27)	3	5:00
Preliminary card (ESPNews / ESPN+)
Middleweight	Alex Pereira	def.	Andreas Michailidis	TKO (flying knee and punches)	2	0:18
Lightweight	Bobby Green	def.	Al Iaquinta	TKO (punches)	1	2:25
Middleweight	Chris Curtis	def.	Phil Hawes	KO (punches)	1	4:27
Middleweight	Nassourdine Imavov	def.	Edmen Shahbazyan	TKO (elbows)	2	4:42
Early preliminary card (ESPN+ / UFC Fight Pass)
Welterweight	Ian Machado Garry	def.	Jordan Williams	KO (punches)	1	4:59
Heavyweight	Chris Barnett	def.	Gian Villante	TKO (spinning wheel kick and punches)	2	2:23
Light Heavyweight	Dustin Jacoby	def.	John Allan	Decision (unanimous) (29–28, 29–28, 30–27)	3	5:00
Catchweight (148.4 lb)	Melsik Baghdasaryan	def.	Bruno Souza	Decision (unanimous) (29–28, 29–28, 29–28)	3	5:00
Catchweight (127.4 lb)	Ode' Osbourne	def.	C.J. Vergara	Decision (unanimous) (29–28, 29–28, 29–28)	3	5:00

== Bonus awards ==
The following fighters received $50,000 bonuses.

- Fight of the Night: Justin Gaethje vs. Michael Chandler
- Performance of the Night: Marlon Vera, Alex Pereira, Bobby Green, and Chris Barnett

== Aftermath ==
This event won the UFC Honors 2021 Event of the Year award as voted by the fans.

== See also ==
- List of UFC events
- List of current UFC fighters
- 2021 in UFC
