= Kamaru Usman =

Nigerian-American mixed martial artist (born 1987)

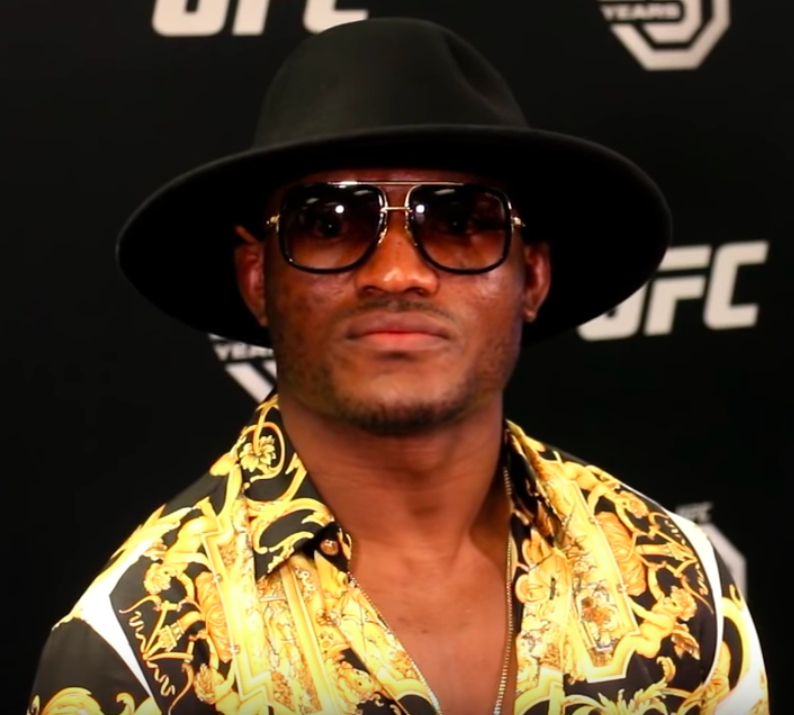
- Usman at UFC 228 press conference in 2018
- Born: Kamarudeen Usman; May 11, 1987 (age 39); Auchi, Edo, Nigeria
- Nickname: The Nigerian Nightmare
- Height: 6 ft 0 in (183 cm)
- Weight: 185 lb (84 kg; 13 st 3 lb)
- Division: Welterweight (2012–present); Middleweight (2023–present)
- Reach: 76 in (193 cm)
- Style: Wrestling
- Stance: Orthodox
- Fighting out of: Denver, Colorado, U.S.
- Team: Blackzilians (2011–2017); Kill Cliff FC (2017–2020, 2022–present); Onx Sports (2020–present)
- Trainer: Jorge Santiago (grappling); Trevor Wittman (striking)
- Rank: Black belt in Brazilian Jiu-Jitsu under Jorge Santiago
- Wrestling: NCAA Division II Wrestling
- Years active: 2010–2012 (freestyle wrestling); 2012–present (MMA)

Mixed martial arts record
- Total: 26
- Wins: 21
- By knockout: 9
- By submission: 1
- By decision: 11
- Losses: 5
- By knockout: 1
- By submission: 1
- By decision: 3

Other information
- Mixed martial arts record from Sherdog
Medal record
Men's collegiate wrestling
Representing the Nebraska–Kearney Lopers
NCAA Division II Championships
Gold medal – first place	2010 Omaha	174 lb
Silver medal – second place	2009 Houston	174 lb
Bronze medal – third place	2008 Cedar Rapids	174 lb

YouTube information
- Channel: Kamaru Usman
- Subscribers: 63 thousand
- Views: 4.2 million
- Last updated: January 16, 2026

Kamarudeen Usman (born May 11, 1987) is a Nigerian-American professional mixed martial artist, former freestyle wrestler, and graduated folkstyle wrestler. He currently competes in the Welterweight division of the Ultimate Fighting Championship (UFC), where he is a former UFC Welterweight Champion. Usman is also The Ultimate Fighter 21 tournament winner. He is considered one of the greatest welterweights of all time. He holds the records for longest winning streak in the UFC welterweight division at 15 and takedown defense percentage (97.3%). As of November 14, 2026, he is #12 in the Meta UFC welterweight rankings.

As a freestyle wrestler, Usman primarily competed at 84 kilograms (185 lb), and was a 2010 U.S. University World Team Member. Collegiately, he competed at 174 pounds (79 kg), and was the 2010 NCAA Division II national champion, a three–time NCAA Division II All-American, and a NAIA national qualifier.

== Early life ==
Usman was born in Auchi, Edo state of Nigeria. His father was a major in the Nigerian Army and his mother was a teacher. Usman had a modest upbringing during his childhood. Usman's father Muhammed Nasiru Usman, who became a pharmacist in the United States, brought his family into the country when Usman was eight years old, immigrating to Dallas, Texas. He has two brothers, Kashetu and Mohammed, the latter of whom is also a mixed martial artist and fellow The Ultimate Fighter (TUF) winner.

== Wrestling career ==
Usman started wrestling in his sophomore year at Bowie High School in Arlington, Texas. Because Usman's wrestling coach at the time had trouble pronouncing his first name Kamarudeen, he got the nickname "Marty" when he joined the team and it stuck with him during his amateur wrestling career. After compiling a 53–3 record as a senior and placing third at the Texas state championships, Usman wrestled at the senior national championships before leaving for college.

In college, Usman wrestled in Iowa at William Penn University for one year, where he was an NAIA national qualifier in 2007, but was unable to attend the tournament due to a snowstorm; half of his team and his head coach, however, left early for the tournament without him, which frustrated Usman and influenced him to leave William Penn. He later transferred to the University of Nebraska at Kearney (UNK), which previously tried to recruit him under advisement of then-UNK wrestler Tervel Dlagnev, and subsequently helped the Lopers win their first-ever team title in 2008. Usman placed top three in the nation all three years he attended UNK and was a two-time national finalist. He became the NCAA Division II national champion at 174 pounds in 2010, finishing the season with a 44–1 record and 30 straight wins.

Shortly after his folkstyle career was over, Usman turned his attention to freestyle wrestling and became a resident of the United States Olympic Training Center, with hopes of making the 2012 Olympic team. Despite making the U.S. University World Team in 2010, Usman was sidetracked by injuries and eventually abandoned his Olympic goal after failing to qualify for the 2012 U.S. Olympic Team Trials, turning his attention to mixed martial arts instead. Former National Football League (NFL) star Christian Okoye, who has the nickname "The Nigerian Nightmare" trademarked, gave his blessing for Usman to use it.

== Mixed martial arts career ==
=== Professional MMA career ===
In 2011, Usman served as the wrestling coach for Team Miller in The Ultimate Fighter season fourteen. After failing to qualify for the 2012 US Olympic Team Trials in freestyle wrestling, Usman made his professional MMA debut in November 2012. He compiled a record of 5–1, competing for several regional promotions before trying out for The Ultimate Fighter in early 2015.

=== The Ultimate Fighter ===
In February 2015, it was announced that Usman was one of the fighters selected to be on The Ultimate Fighter 21.

In his TUF debut and quarterfinal bout of the bracket, Usman faced undefeated eventual Titan FC Welterweight Champion Michael Graves. He won the fight via majority decision.

In the semifinals, Usman faced off against long-time veteran and former WSOF Welterweight Champion Steve Carl. He won the fight via unanimous decision and advanced to the finals.

In the finals, Usman faced Hayder Hassan on July 12, 2015, at The Ultimate Fighter 21 Finale. He won the bout via submission in the second round, thus winning a six-figure contract with the UFC. He was also awarded the Performance of the Night award.

=== Ultimate Fighting Championship ===
==== 2015 ====
In his official debut as a UFC athlete, Usman faced future champion Leon Edwards on December 19, 2015, at UFC on Fox 17. He won the fight by unanimous decision.

==== 2016 ====
Usman was expected to face two-time World Jiu-Jitsu Champion Sérgio Moraes on May 14, 2016, at UFC 198. However, it was announced on May 1 that Usman had pulled out of the bout for undisclosed reasons and was replaced by promotional newcomer Luan Chagas.

In his first bout of the year, Usman faced Alexander Yakovlev on July 23, 2016, at UFC on Fox 20. He won the one-sided fight via unanimous decision after out-grappling Yakovlev.

Usman faced TUF: Brazil 3 tournament winner Warlley Alves on November 19, 2016, at UFC Fight Night 100. He won the match by unanimous decision for the third-straight time.

==== 2017 ====
Usman faced former long-time KOTC Middleweight Champion Sean Strickland on April 8, 2017, at UFC 210. He once again won the fight via unanimous decision.

A rescheduled bout with a Sérgio Moraes on a seven-match unbeaten streak eventually took place on September 16, 2017, at UFC Fight Night 116. Usman won the fight via one-punch knockout in the first round.

Usman was scheduled to face Venator FC Welterweight Champion Emil Weber Meek on December 30, 2017, at UFC 219, however, Meek presented VISA problems and the pair was rescheduled for UFC Fight Night 124. Usman won the fight by unanimous decision after out-wrestling his opponent.

==== 2018 ====
Usman was expected to face Santiago Ponzinibbio on May 19, 2018, at UFC Fight Night 129. However, on April 21, Ponzinibbio was pulled from the card due to injury and replaced by ADCC Grappling World Champion and two-time UFC title challenger Demian Maia. After denying all of Maia's fifteen attempts of takedowns and out-performing his opponent on the feet, Usman won the fight via unanimous decision.

On August 18, it was announced that Usman would serve as a back-up for the UFC 228 main event match between long-time champion Tyron Woodley and undefeated challenger Darren Till.

Usman faced former UFC Lightweight Champion Rafael dos Anjos on November 30, 2018, at The Ultimate Fighter 28 Finale. He won the fight via unanimous decision. This win earned him his second Performance of the Night award.

==== 2019 ====
Riding a nine-fight winning streak in the UFC, Usman next faced UFC Welterweight Champion Tyron Woodley on March 2, 2019, in the co-main event at UFC 235. He won the one-sided fight via unanimous decision after dominating Woodley for five rounds.

Usman made his first title defense and faced long-time rival Colby Covington at UFC 245 on December 14, 2019. Despite both athletes being mostly offensive wrestlers, the fight did not include any grappling and contained high-paced offense in the striking instead. After a fight often referred to as a five-round "slugfest", Usman was able to knockdown his opponent twice before finishing him with strikes in the fifth round to be declared the winner via technical knockout, which set the record for the latest finish in UFC welterweight history. This fight earned both participants the Fight of the Night award.

==== 2020 ====
Usman was scheduled to defend his title for the second time against long-time teammate and two-time No-Gi Jiu-Jitsu World Champion Gilbert Burns on July 12, 2020 at UFC 251. Both being originally from the same camp – Sanford MMA – Usman opted to train under Trevor Wittman heading into the fight. On July 3, 2020, it was revealed that Burns tested positive for COVID-19 and he was subsequently removed from the card. On July 5, 2020, it was reported that Jorge Masvidal stepped in on short notice to replace Burns. Usman won via unanimous decision. The card reportedly generated 1.3 million pay-per-view buys in the United States, the most since UFC 229 in October 2018.

==== 2021 ====
Usman was once again scheduled to defend his title against BJJ World Champion Gilbert Burns, on December 12, 2020, at UFC 256. However, on October 5, 2020, It was reported that Usman had pulled out from the bout, citing more time needed to recover from undisclosed injuries and the bout was postponed for February 13, 2021, as the headliner for UFC 258. Usman defended his title for the third time, as he won the fight via technical knockout in the third round, surpassing the record of the former UFC Welterweight Champion Georges St-Pierre for the largest win-streak in the division with thirteen. This win earned him the Performance of the Night award.

For his fifth title bout, Usman rematched against Jorge Masvidal for the UFC Welterweight Championship on April 24, 2021, at UFC 261 in Florida. He successfully defended his title after knocking out Masvidal in the second round, becoming the first to do so in the UFC. This win earned Usman his fourth Performance of the Night bonus award.

Usman rematched Colby Covington for the UFC Welterweight Championship on November 6, 2021 at UFC 268. Usman retained his championship, being declared the winner via unanimous decision.

==== 2022 ====
Usman met Leon Edwards in a rematch of their 2015 fight, attempting to make his sixth title defense on August 20, 2022 at UFC 278. Usman entered the fight with a -425 winning favour while odd-makers saw Leon as a +315 underdog. Usman lost the fight and title via knockout late in the fifth round, marking Usman's first loss inside the UFC.

==== 2023 ====
A third fight between Usman and Edwards took place on March 18, 2023, at UFC 286 for the UFC Welterweight Championship. He lost the bout via majority decision.

Usman stepped in on 10 days notice, replacing an injured Paulo Costa, to face Khamzat Chimaev in a middleweight bout on October 21, 2023, at UFC 294, which also was Usman's middleweight MMA debut. He lost the fight via majority decision.

==== 2025 ====
After a two-year layoff, Usman returned and faced Joaquin Buckley on June 14, 2025 in the main event of UFC on ESPN 69. He won the fight via unanimous decision. This fight earned him another Fight of the Night award.

==== 2026 ====
In his return to the middleweight division, Usman faced former UFC Middleweight Champion Dricus du Plessis on July 18, 2026 in the main event at UFC Fight Night 281. He lost the fight by unanimous decision. This fight earned him a $100,000 Fight of the Night award.

== Fighting style ==
Usman began his UFC career with a wrestling-heavy style, often relying on his NCAA Division II background to dominate opponents with pressure, clinch control, and takedowns against the fence.

Over time, especially under the coaching of Trevor Wittman, Usman’s striking evolved significantly. He began fighting at range more often, developing a powerful jab and greater comfort in exchanges. His knockout wins over Gilbert Burns and Jorge Masvidal showcased this transformation, with Usman mixing clean punching mechanics with measured aggression.

Usman's fighting style emphasized control above all—whether through position, rhythm, or timing. His ability to blend phases of the fight, switching between striking, clinch work, and takedown threats, made him one of the most well-rounded welterweights in UFC history.

== Personal life ==
Born to a Muslim father and Christian mother, Usman identifies as a Muslim. His father, Muhammed Nasiru Usman, who had previous convictions in Tarrant County for theft and drunk driving, was convicted in May 2010 of offenses including health care fraud and money laundering. He was sentenced to 15 years imprisonment and ordered to pay $1,300,000 in restitution. He was released from FCI Seagoville on March 16, 2021.

Usman has a daughter who was born in 2014.

Usman has a younger brother named Mohammed who was also in The Ultimate Fighter, in the Heavyweight division, winning the UFC contract and becoming the first two brothers to do so.

Usman was a guest star in the film Black Panther: Wakanda Forever (2022), playing a naval officer. Usman appears as an MMA fighter along with fellow UFC fighter Justin Gaethje in the 2025 film The Naked Gun.

In 2024, Usman endorsed Donald Trump for President of the United States.

== Championships and accomplishments ==
=== Folkstyle wrestling ===
- National Collegiate Athletic Association
  - NCAA Division II National Championship (174 lbs, 2010)
  - NCAA Division II All-American (174 lbs, 2008, 2009, 2010)
- National Association of Intercollegiate Athletics
  - NAIA National Qualifier (165 lbs, 2007)
- University Interscholastic League
  - UIL All-State out of Bowie High School (145 lbs, 2005)
- National Wrestling Coaches Association
  - Jim Koch Division II Hall of Fame, 2022 Class

=== Mixed martial arts ===
- Ultimate Fighting Championship
  - UFC Welterweight Championship (One time)
    - Five successful title defenses
    - Third most title fight wins in UFC Welterweight division history (6)
    - Latest knockout in UFC title fight history vs. Colby Covington
    - First Nigerian-born UFC champion
  - The Ultimate Fighter 21 tournament winner
  - Fight of the Night (Three times) vs. Colby Covington 1, Joaquin Buckley and Dricus du Plessis
  - Performance of the Night (Four times) vs. Hayder Hassan, Rafael dos Anjos, Gilbert Burns, and Jorge Masvidal 2
  - Latest finish in UFC Welterweight history vs. Colby Covington
  - Most consecutive wins in UFC Welterweight history (15)
    - Third most consecutive wins in UFC History (15)
  - Tied (Belal Muhammad) for most unanimous decision wins in UFC Welterweight division history (11)
    - Tied (Rafael dos Anjos, Brad Tavares & Belal Muhammad) for second most unanimous decision wins in UFC history (11)
    - Fourth most decision wins in UFC Welterweight division history (11)
  - Tied (Vicente Luque) for fourth most wins in UFC Welterweight division history (16)
  - Second most total strikes landed in a UFC title fight (336 vs. Tyron Woodley)
  - Third most significant strikes landed in UFC Welterweight division history (1375)
  - Third most total strikes landed in UFC Welterweight division history (2506)
  - Longest average fight time in UFC Welterweight division history (18:00)
  - Sixth most total fight time in UFC Welterweight division history (5:23:57)
  - Second longest control time in UFC Welterweight division history (2:26:48) (behind Georges St-Pierre)
    - Fifth most control time in UFC history (2:13:51)
  - Fourth most top-position time in UFC Welterweight division history (1:37:26)
  - Fourth most takedowns landed in UFC Welterweight division history (63)
  - Highest takedown defense percentage in UFC Welterweight division history (97.3%)
  - Holds wins over five former UFC champions (4 undisputed) — vs. Leon Edwards, Sean Strickland, Rafael dos Anjos, Tyron Woodley and Colby Covington (interim) (x2)
  - UFC Honors Awards
    - 2021: Fan's Choice Knockout of the Year Winner vs. Jorge Masvidal 2 & President's Choice Performance of the Year Nominee vs. Jorge Masvidal 2
  - UFC.com Awards
    - 2015: Ranked #6 Newcomer of the Year
    - 2018: Ranked #10 Fighter of the Year (Tied with Corey Anderson & Thiago Santos)
    - 2019: Top 10 Fighter of the Year, Ranked #2 Fight of the Year vs. Colby Covington 1 & Ranked #8 Upset of the Year vs. Tyron Woodley
    - 2021: Fighter of the Year & Knockout of the Year vs. Jorge Masvidal 2
- MMA Junkie
  - 2019 December Fight of the Month vs. Colby Covington
  - 2021 Male Fighter of the Year
  - 2021 February Fight of the Month vs. Gilbert Burns
  - 2021 April Knockout of the Month vs. Jorge Masvidal
- World MMA Awards
  - 2021 The Charles 'Mask' Lewis Fighter of the Year
- Black Belt magazine
  - 2022 MMA Fighter of the Year
- MMA Fighting
  - 2021 Fighter of the Year
  - 2021 Knockout of the Year vs. Jorge Masvidal
- ESPN
  - 2019 Rivalry of the Year vs. Colby Covington
  - 2021 Male Fighter of the Year
  - #10 Ranked Men's MMA Fighter of the 21st Century
- MMA Mania
  - 2021 Knockout of the Year vs. Jorge Masvidal
- Bleacher Report
  - 2021 Fighter of the Year
  - 2021 Knockout of the Year vs. Jorge Masvidal at UFC 261
- Yahoo! Sports
  - 2021 Fighter of the Year
- Cageside Press
  - 2021 Male Fighter of the Year
- Lowkick MMA
  - 2021 Fighter of the Year
- CBS Sports
  - 2019 #5 Ranked UFC Fighter of the Year
  - 2019 #5 Ranked UFC Fight of the Year vs. Colby Covington
  - 2021 UFC Fighter of the Year
  - 2021 #2 Ranked UFC Knockout of the Year vs. Jorge Masvidal
- Combat Press
  - 2021 Male Fighter of the Year
- Wrestling Observer Newsletter
  - Mixed Martial Arts Most Valuable (2021)
  - Most Outstanding Fighter of the Year (2021)
- BT Sport
  - 2021 Male Fighter of the Year
- Fight Matrix
  - 2019 Male Fighter of the Year
  - 2021 Male Fighter of the Year

== Mixed martial arts record ==
Professional record breakdown
26 matches	21 wins	5 losses
By knockout	9	1
By submission	1	1
By decision	11	3

Res.	Record	Opponent	Method	Event	Date	Round	Time	Location	Notes
Loss	21–5	Dricus du Plessis	Decision (unanimous)	UFC Fight Night: du Plessis vs. Usman	July 18, 2026	5	5:00	Oklahoma City, Oklahoma, United States	Fight of the Night.
Win	21–4	Joaquin Buckley	Decision (unanimous)	UFC on ESPN: Usman vs. Buckley	June 14, 2025	5	5:00	Atlanta, Georgia, United States	Welterweight bout. Fight of the Night.
Loss	20–4	Khamzat Chimaev	Decision (majority)	UFC 294	October 21, 2023	3	5:00	Abu Dhabi, United Arab Emirates	Middleweight debut.
Loss	20–3	Leon Edwards	Decision (majority)	UFC 286	March 18, 2023	5	5:00	London, England	For the UFC Welterweight Championship. Edwards was deducted one point in round 3 due to grabbing the fence.
Loss	20–2	Leon Edwards	KO (head kick)	UFC 278	August 20, 2022	5	4:04	Salt Lake City, Utah, United States	Lost the UFC Welterweight Championship.
Win	20–1	Colby Covington	Decision (unanimous)	UFC 268	November 6, 2021	5	5:00	New York City, New York, United States	Defended the UFC Welterweight Championship.
Win	19–1	Jorge Masvidal	KO (punch)	UFC 261	April 24, 2021	2	1:02	Jacksonville, Florida, United States	Defended the UFC Welterweight Championship. Performance of the Night.
Win	18–1	Gilbert Burns	TKO (punches)	UFC 258	February 13, 2021	3	0:34	Las Vegas, Nevada, United States	Defended the UFC Welterweight Championship. Performance of the Night.
Win	17–1	Jorge Masvidal	Decision (unanimous)	UFC 251	July 12, 2020	5	5:00	Abu Dhabi, United Arab Emirates	Defended the UFC Welterweight Championship.
Win	16–1	Colby Covington	TKO (punches)	UFC 245	December 14, 2019	5	4:10	Las Vegas, Nevada, United States	Defended the UFC Welterweight Championship. Fight of the Night.
Win	15–1	Tyron Woodley	Decision (unanimous)	UFC 235	March 2, 2019	5	5:00	Las Vegas, Nevada, United States	Won the UFC Welterweight Championship.
Win	14–1	Rafael dos Anjos	Decision (unanimous)	The Ultimate Fighter: Heavy Hitters Finale	November 30, 2018	5	5:00	Las Vegas, Nevada, United States	Performance of the Night.
Win	13–1	Demian Maia	Decision (unanimous)	UFC Fight Night: Maia vs. Usman	May 19, 2018	5	5:00	Santiago, Chile	
Win	12–1	Emil Weber Meek	Decision (unanimous)	UFC Fight Night: Stephens vs. Choi	January 14, 2018	3	5:00	St. Louis, Missouri, United States	
Win	11–1	Sérgio Moraes	KO (punch)	UFC Fight Night: Rockhold vs. Branch	September 16, 2017	1	2:48	Pittsburgh, Pennsylvania, United States	
Win	10–1	Sean Strickland	Decision (unanimous)	UFC 210	April 8, 2017	3	5:00	Buffalo, New York, United States	
Win	9–1	Warlley Alves	Decision (unanimous)	UFC Fight Night: Bader vs. Nogueira 2	November 19, 2016	3	5:00	São Paulo, Brazil	
Win	8–1	Alexander Yakovlev	Decision (unanimous)	UFC on Fox: Holm vs. Shevchenko	July 23, 2016	3	5:00	Chicago, Illinois, United States	Yakovlev was deducted one point in round 1 for grabbing the cage.
Win	7–1	Leon Edwards	Decision (unanimous)	UFC on Fox: dos Anjos vs. Cowboy 2	December 19, 2015	3	5:00	Orlando, Florida, United States	
Win	6–1	Hayder Hassan	Submission (arm-triangle choke)	The Ultimate Fighter: American Top Team vs. Blackzilians Finale	July 12, 2015	2	1:19	Las Vegas, Nevada, United States	Won The Ultimate Fighter 21 Welterweight Tournament. Performance of the Night.
Win	5–1	Marcus Hicks	TKO (punches)	Legacy FC 33	July 18, 2014	2	5:00	Allen, Texas, United States	
Win	4–1	Lenny Lovoto	TKO (punches)	Legacy FC 30	April 4, 2014	3	1:04	Albuquerque, New Mexico, United States	
Win	3–1	Steven Rodriguez	TKO (punches)	Legacy FC 27	January 31, 2014	1	1:31	Houston, Texas, United States	
Win	2–1	Rashid Abdullah	TKO (punches)	Victory FC 41	December 14, 2013	1	3:49	Ralston, Nebraska, United States	Catchweight (180 lb) bout.
Loss	1–1	Jose Caceres	Submission (rear-naked choke)	CFA 11	May 24, 2013	1	3:47	Coral Gables, Florida, United States	
Win	1–0	David Glover	TKO (punches)	RFA 5	November 30, 2012	2	4:50	Kearney, Nebraska, United States	Welterweight debut.

Exhibition record breakdown		
2 matches	2 wins	0 losses
By decision	2	0

Res.	Record	Opponent	Method	Event	Date	Round	Time	Location	Notes
Win	2–0	Steve Carl	Decision (unanimous)	The Ultimate Fighter: American Top Team vs. Blackzilians	June 17, 2015 (airdate)	2	5:00	Boca Raton, Florida, United States	The Ultimate Fighter 21 semifinals round.
Win	1–0	Michael Graves	Decision (majority)	The Ultimate Fighter: American Top Team vs. Blackzilians	April 22, 2015 (airdate)	2	5:00	Boca Raton, Florida, United States	The Ultimate Fighter 21 quarterfinals round.

== Freestyle record ==
Senior Freestyle Matches
Res.	Record	Opponent	Score	Date	Event	Location
2012 US Olympic Trials Qualifier DNP at 84 kg
Loss	35–26	(United States) Evan Brown	1–3, 1–1	March 31 – April 1, 2012	2012 US Olympic Trials Qualifier	(United States) Cedar Falls, Iowa
Win	35–25	(United States) Ed Richmond	Fall	March 31 – April 1, 2012	2012 US Olympic Trials Qualifier	(United States) Cedar Falls, Iowa
Loss	34–25	(United States) Jake Herbert	2–5, 1–5	March 31 – April 1, 2012	2012 US Olympic Trials Qualifier	(United States) Cedar Falls, Iowa
2012 Dave Schultz M. International DNP at 84 kg
Loss	34–24	(India) Narsingh Yadav	1–2, 1–5	February 2–4, 2012	2012 Dave Schultz Memorial International Open	(United States) Colorado Springs, Colorado
Win	34–23	(United States) Evan Brown	1–0, 1–0	February 2–4, 2012	2012 Dave Schultz Memorial International Open	(United States) Colorado Springs, Colorado
Win	33–23	(Bulgaria) Valentin Sofiadi	2–0, 2–0	February 2–4, 2012	2012 Dave Schultz Memorial International Open	(United States) Colorado Springs, Colorado
Win	32–23	(Canada) Alex Burk	5–2, 2–1	February 2–4, 2012	2012 Dave Schultz Memorial International Open	(United States) Colorado Springs, Colorado
Loss	31–23	(United States) Deron Winn	Fall	February 2–4, 2012	2012 Dave Schultz Memorial International Open	(United States) Colorado Springs, Colorado
Win	31–22	(United States) Kurt Brenner	0–8, 6–4, 2–0	February 2–4, 2012	2012 Dave Schultz Memorial International Open	(United States) Colorado Springs, Colorado
2011 US Olympic Trials Qualifier 4th at 84 kg
Loss	30–22	(United States) Bryce Hasseman	0–1, 0–1	December 3, 2011	2011 US Olympic Trials Qualifier	(United States) Las Vegas, Nevada
Win	30–21	(United States) Travis Paulson	INJ	December 3, 2011	2011 US Olympic Trials Qualifier	(United States) Las Vegas, Nevada
Win	29–21	(United States) James Yonushonis	4–2, 2–1	December 3, 2011	2011 US Olympic Trials Qualifier	(United States) Las Vegas, Nevada
Win	28–21	(United States) Doug Umbehauer	1–1, 2–0	December 3, 2011	2011 US Olympic Trials Qualifier	(United States) Las Vegas, Nevada
Win	27–21	(United States) Kurt Brenner	1–0, 5–2	December 3, 2011	2011 US Olympic Trials Qualifier	(United States) Las Vegas, Nevada
Loss	26–21	(United States) Terry Madden	0–4, 1–4	December 3, 2011	2011 US Olympic Trials Qualifier	(United States) Las Vegas, Nevada
Win	26–20	(United States) Pat Downey	1–1, 3–3, 4–0	December 3, 2011	2011 US Olympic Trials Qualifier	(United States) Las Vegas, Nevada
2011 NYAC Holiday International Open DNP at 84 kg
Loss	25–20	(United States) Kirk Smith	1–1, 0–3	November 11–13, 2011	2011 NYAC Holiday International Open Tournament	(United States) New York City, New York
Win	25–19	(United States) Mike Tamillow	2–1, 3–0	November 11–13, 2011	2011 NYAC Holiday International Open Tournament	(United States) New York City, New York
Loss	24–19	(Puerto Rico) Jaime Espinal	0–4, 4–6	November 11–13, 2011	2011 NYAC Holiday International Open Tournament	(United States) New York City, New York
2011 Sunkist Kids International Open DNP at 84 kg
Loss	24–18	(United States) Mack Lewnes	2–2, 0–6	October 28–30, 2011	2011 Sunkist Kids International Open Tournament	(United States) Mesa, Arizona
Loss	24–17	(United States) Raymond Jordan	0–4, 1–3	October 28–30, 2011	2011 Sunkist Kids International Open Tournament	(United States) Mesa, Arizona
Win	24–16	(United States) Erich Schmidtke	3–0, 1–2, 3–1	October 28–30, 2011	2011 Sunkist Kids International Open Tournament	(United States) Mesa, Arizona
2011 NP Regionals (silver) at 96 kg
Loss	23–16	(United States) Luke Lofthouse	1–1, 4–1, 0–1	May 12–14, 2011	2011 Northern Plains Regional Championships	(United States) Waterloo, Iowa
Win	23–15	(United States) Mike Schmidt	3–3, 7–0, 7–2	May 12–14, 2011	2011 Northern Plains Regional Championships	(United States) Waterloo, Iowa
2011 US University Nationals 7th at 84 kg
Win	22–15	(United States) Kevin Bailey	TF 7–0, 6–0	April 20–23, 2011	2011 US University National Championships	(United States) Akron, Ohio
Loss	21–15	(United States) Max Thomusseit	3–1, 0–1, 0–1	April 20–23, 2011	2011 US University National Championships	(United States) Akron, Ohio
Win	21–14	(United States) Ryan Loder	6–0, 1–3, 2–1	April 20–23, 2011	2011 US University National Championships	(United States) Akron, Ohio
Win	20–14	(United States) Keith Witt	TF 6–0, 6–0	April 20–23, 2011	2011 US University National Championships	(United States) Akron, Ohio
Win	19–14	(United States) Ben Bennett	2–0, 6–0	April 20–23, 2011	2011 US University National Championships	(United States) Akron, Ohio
Loss	18–14	(United States) Nick Heflin	0–1, 1–3	April 20–23, 2011	2011 US University National Championships	(United States) Akron, Ohio
Win	18–13	(United States) Cole Shafer	6–0, 2–0	April 20–23, 2011	2011 US University National Championships	(United States) Akron, Ohio
2011 US Open DNP at 84 kg
Loss	17–13	(United States) Raymond Jordan	0–2, 0–2	April 7–10, 2011	2011 US Open National Championships	(United States) Cleveland, Ohio
Loss	17–12	(United States) Bryce Hasseman	1–1, 0–3	April 7–10, 2011	2011 US Open National Championships	(United States) Cleveland, Ohio
Win	17–11	(United States) Evan Brown	0–1, 2–1, 1–0	April 7–10, 2011	2011 US Open National Championships – Qualifier	(United States) Cleveland, Ohio
Win	16–11	(United States) Christopher Honeycutt	1–1, 2–3, 2–1	April 7–10, 2011	2011 US Open National Championships – Qualifier	(United States) Cleveland, Ohio
Win	15–11	(United States) Kaleb Young	3–2, 1–0	April 7–10, 2011	2011 US Open National Championships – Qualifier	(United States) Cleveland, Ohio
Loss	14–11	(United States) Nick Heflin	0–1, 4–1, 0–1	April 7–10, 2011	2011 US Open National Championships – Qualifier	(United States) Cleveland, Ohio
Win	14–10	(United States) Dwight Middleton	TF 6–0, 6–0	April 7–10, 2011	2011 US Open National Championships – Qualifier	(United States) Cleveland, Ohio
2011 Dave Schultz M. International DNP at 84 kg
Loss	13–10	(Puerto Rico) Jaime Espinal	Fall	February 2–5, 2011	2011 Dave Schultz Memorial International Open	(United States) Colorado Springs, Colorado
Win	13–9	(United States) James Yonushonis	TF 5–0, 8–2	February 2–5, 2011	2011 Dave Schultz Memorial International Open	(United States) Colorado Springs, Colorado
Loss	12–9	(Japan) Shinya Matsumoto	2–4, 1–4	February 2–5, 2011	2011 Dave Schultz Memorial International Open	(United States) Colorado Springs, Colorado
Win	12–8	(United States) Jake Landals	5–0, 7–0	February 2–5, 2011	2011 Dave Schultz Memorial International Open	(United States) Colorado Springs, Colorado
Win	11–8	(United States) James Reynolds	4–1, 7–0	February 2–5, 2011	2011 Dave Schultz Memorial International Open	(United States) Colorado Springs, Colorado
2010 NYAC International Open DNP at 84 kg
Loss	10–8	(United States) Raymond Jordan	Fall	November 20–21, 2010	2010 NYAC International Open Tournament	(United States) New York City, New York
Win	10–7	(United States) Jason Lapham	1–0, 3–0	November 20–21, 2010	2010 NYAC International Open Tournament	(United States) New York City, New York
Win	9–7	(United States) Robert Isley	2–1, 4–2	November 20–21, 2010	2010 NYAC International Open Tournament	(United States) New York City, New York
Loss	8–7	(United States) Keith Gavin	1–0, 1–2, 0–2	November 20–21, 2010	2010 NYAC International Open Tournament	(United States) New York City, New York
Win	8–6	(Ukraine) Vitaliy Horodnytskyy	2–0, 2–1	November 20–21, 2010	2010 NYAC International Open Tournament	(United States) New York City, New York
2010 University World Championships 8th at 84 kg
Loss	7–6	(Lithuania) Giedrius Morkis	Fall	October 30, 2010	2010 University World Championships	Torino, Italy
Loss	7–5	(Moldova) Piotr Ianulov	0–6	October 30, 2010	2010 University World Championships	Torino, Italy
Win	7–4	(Canada) Alex Burk	9–2	October 30, 2010	2010 University World Championships	Torino, Italy
2010 US University World Team Trials 5th at 74 kg
Loss	6–4	(United States) Adam Hall	2–0, 0–1, 2–4	May 28–29, 2010	2010 US University World Team Trials	(United States) Colorado Springs, Colorado
Win	6–3	(United States) Albert White	2–1, 2–0	May 28–29, 2010	2010 US University World Team Trials	(United States) Colorado Springs, Colorado
Loss	5–3	(United States) Jon Reader	0–4, 1–5	May 28–29, 2010	2010 US University World Team Trials	(United States) Colorado Springs, Colorado
Win	5–2	(United States) John Paul O`Connor	0–3, 4–3, 5–0	May 28–29, 2010	2010 US University World Team Trials	(United States) Colorado Springs, Colorado
Win	4–2	(United States) Matt Ballweg	5–1, 6–0	May 28–29, 2010	2010 US University World Team Trials	(United States) Colorado Springs, Colorado
2010 US Open DNP at 74 kg
Loss	3–2	(United States) David Bonin	1–2, 4–0, 3–3	April 22–24, 2010	2010 US Open National Championships	(United States) Cleveland, Ohio
Loss	3–1	(United States) Travis Paulson	3–1, 0–1, 0–6	April 22–24, 2010	2010 US Open National Championships	(United States) Cleveland, Ohio
Win	3–0	(United States) Derek Peperas	INJ	April 22–24, 2010	2010 US Open National Championships – Qualifier	(United States) Cleveland, Ohio
Win	2–0	(United States) David Foxen	TF 6–0, 7–0	April 22–24, 2010	2010 US Open National Championships – Qualifier	(United States) Cleveland, Ohio
Win	1–0	(United States) Michael Mitchell	3–5, 3–2, 6–0	April 22–24, 2010	2010 US Open National Championships – Qualifier	(United States) Cleveland, Ohio

== NCAA record ==
NCAA Division II Championships Matches
Res.	Record	Opponent	Score	Date	Event
2010 NCAA (DII) Championships (gold) at 174 lbs
Win	11–2	Luke Rynish	5–4	March 13, 2010	2010 NCAA Division II Wrestling Championships
Win	10–2	Christopher Barrick	6–5	March 13, 2010	2010 NCAA Division II Wrestling Championships
Win	9–2	Aaron Denson	2–0	March 13, 2010	2010 NCAA Division II Wrestling Championships
Win	8–2	Ben Becker	9–2	March 13, 2010	2010 NCAA Division II Wrestling Championships
2009 NCAA (DII) Championships (silver) at 174 lbs
Loss	7–2	Brett Hunter	2–3	March 14, 2009	2009 NCAA Division II Wrestling Championships
Win	7–1	Ross Taplin	2–0	March 14, 2009	2009 NCAA Division II Wrestling Championships
Win	6–1	Jarret Hall	4–2	March 14, 2009	2009 NCAA Division II Wrestling Championships
Win	5–1	Luke Rynish	8–5	March 14, 2009	2009 NCAA Division II Wrestling Championships
2008 NCAA (DII) Championships (bronze) at 174 lbs
Win	4–1	Josh Shields	3–2	March 15, 2008	2008 NCAA Division II Wrestling Championships
Win	3–1	Chris Gibbs	4–1	March 15, 2008	2008 NCAA Division II Wrestling Championships
Loss	2–1	Albert Miles	2–6	March 15, 2008	2008 NCAA Division II Wrestling Championships
Win	2–0	Tyler Tubbs	SV–1 7–5	March 15, 2008	2008 NCAA Division II Wrestling Championships
Win	1–0	Chris Gibbs	MD 10–0	March 15, 2008	2008 NCAA Division II Wrestling Championships

== Pay-per-view bouts ==
No.	Event	Fight	Date	Venue	City	PPV buys
1.	UFC 245	Usman vs. Covington	December 14, 2019	T-Mobile Arena	Paradise, Nevada, United States	Not Disclosed
2.	UFC 251	Usman vs. Masvidal	July 12, 2020	Flash Forum	Abu Dhabi, United Arab Emirates	1,300,000
3.	UFC 258	Usman vs. Burns	February 13, 2021	UFC Apex	Enterprise, Nevada, United States	Not Disclosed
4.	UFC 261	Usman vs. Masvidal 2	April 24, 2021	VyStar Veterans Memorial Arena	Jacksonville, Florida, United States	700,000
5.	UFC 268	Usman vs. Covington 2	November 6, 2021	Madison Square Garden	New York City, New York, United States	700,000
6.	UFC 278	Usman vs. Edwards 2	August 20, 2022	Vivint Arena	Salt Lake City, Utah, United States	Not Disclosed
7.	UFC 286	Edwards vs. Usman 3	March 18, 2023	The O2 Arena	London, England, United Kingdom	Not Disclosed
Total sales						2,700,000

== See also ==
- List of current UFC fighters
- List of male mixed martial artists

Achievements
Preceded by Tyron Woodley	12th UFC Welterweight Champion; March 2, 2019 – August 20, 2022	Succeeded by Leon Edwards
Awards
Preceded by Israel Adesanya	World MMA Fighter of the Year; 2020–21	Succeeded by Alexander Volkanovski
