= Pojuca =

Municipality of Bahia, Brazil

Coordinates: 12°25′51″S 38°19′40″W

- Municipality
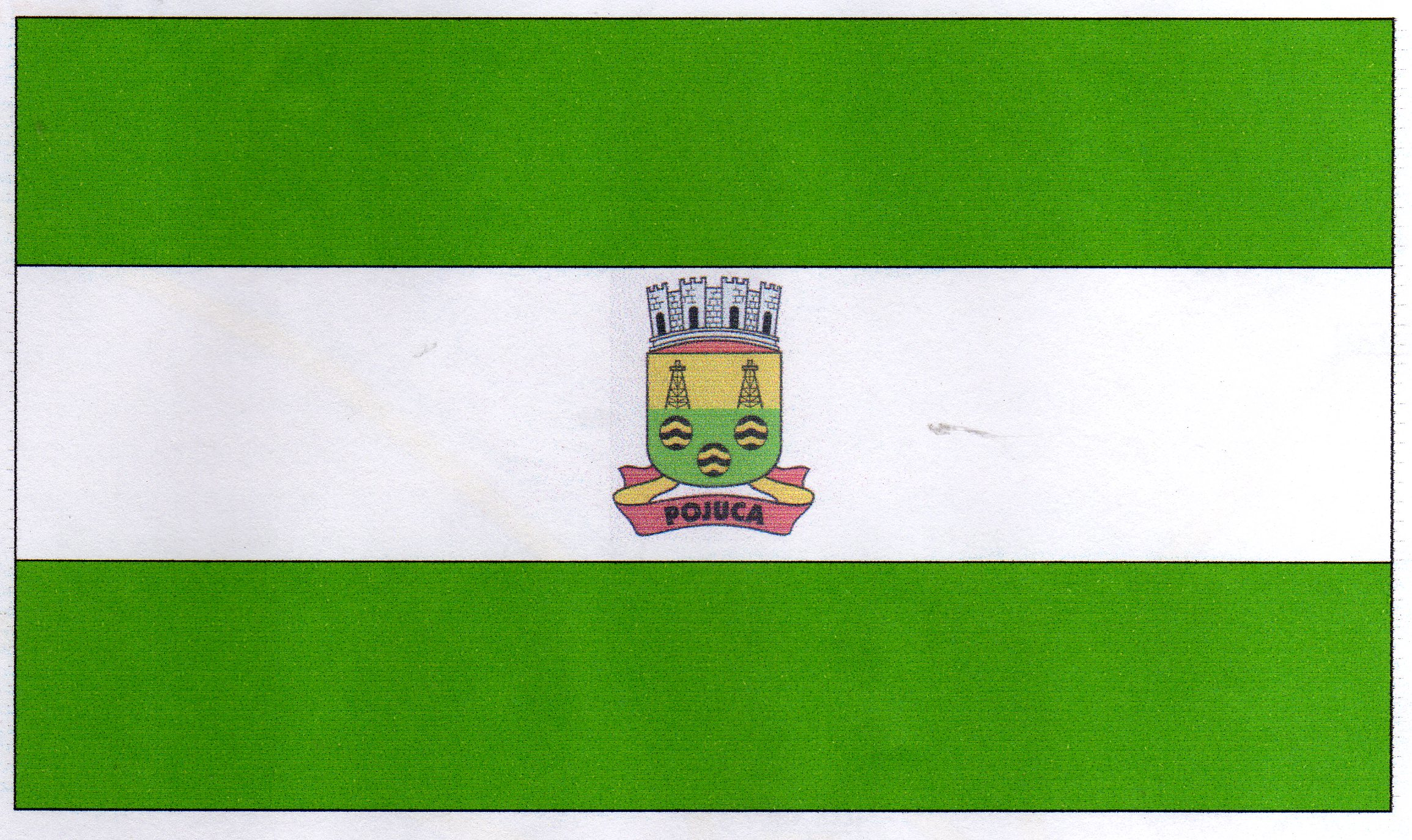
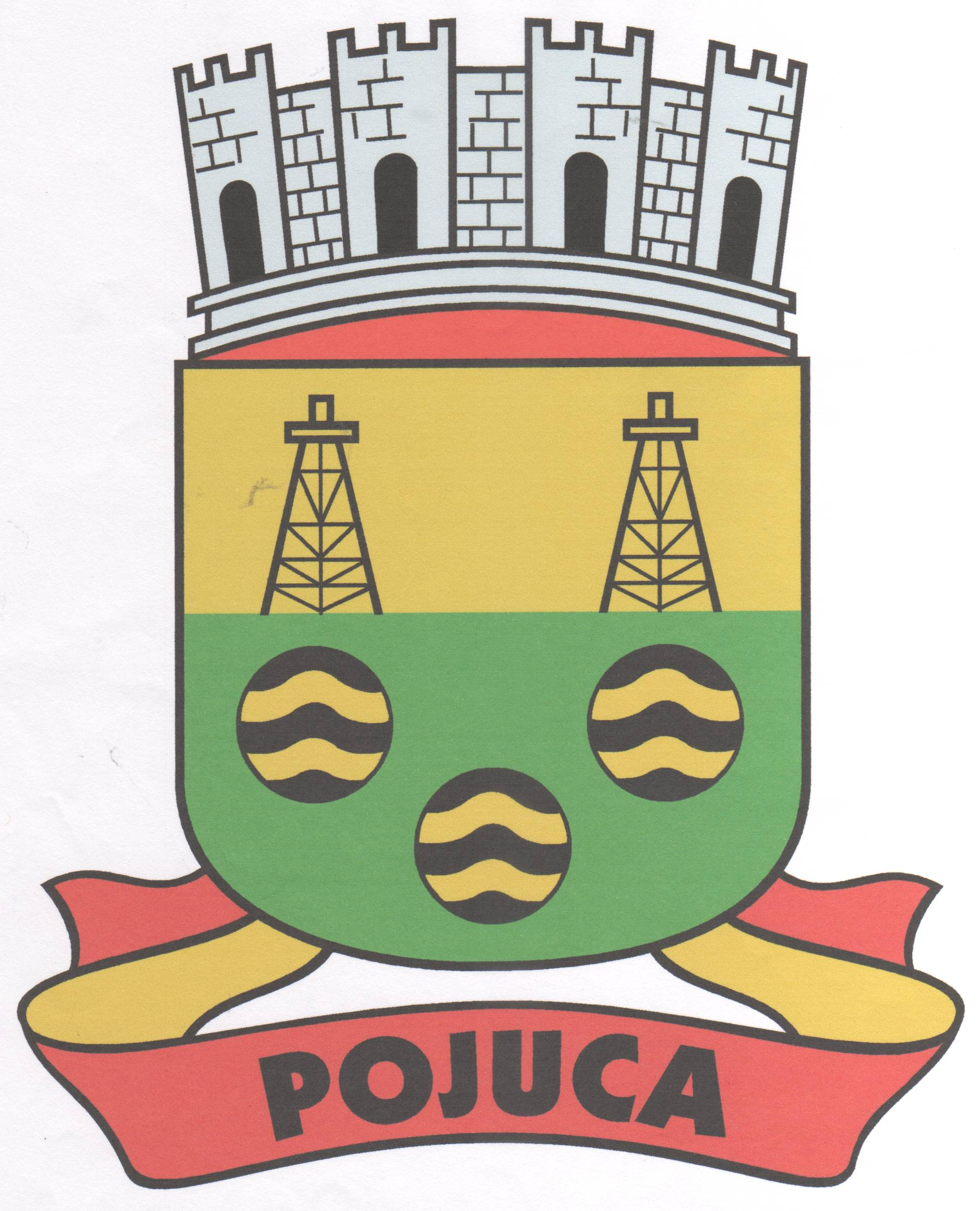
- Flag Coat of arms
- Interactive map of Pojuca
- Country: Brazil
- Region: Nordeste
- State: Bahia

Population (2020)
  - Total: 39,972
- Time zone: UTC−3 (BRT)

Pojuca is a municipality in the state of Bahia in the North-East region of Brazil.

Pojuca is the birthplace of mixed martial artist and former UFC Women's Featherweight Champion and two-time Women's Bantamweight Champion Amanda Nunes.

== Localities ==
- Miranga

== See also ==
- List of municipalities in Bahia
