= Germaine de Randamie =

Dutch kickboxer and mixed martial artist (born 1984)

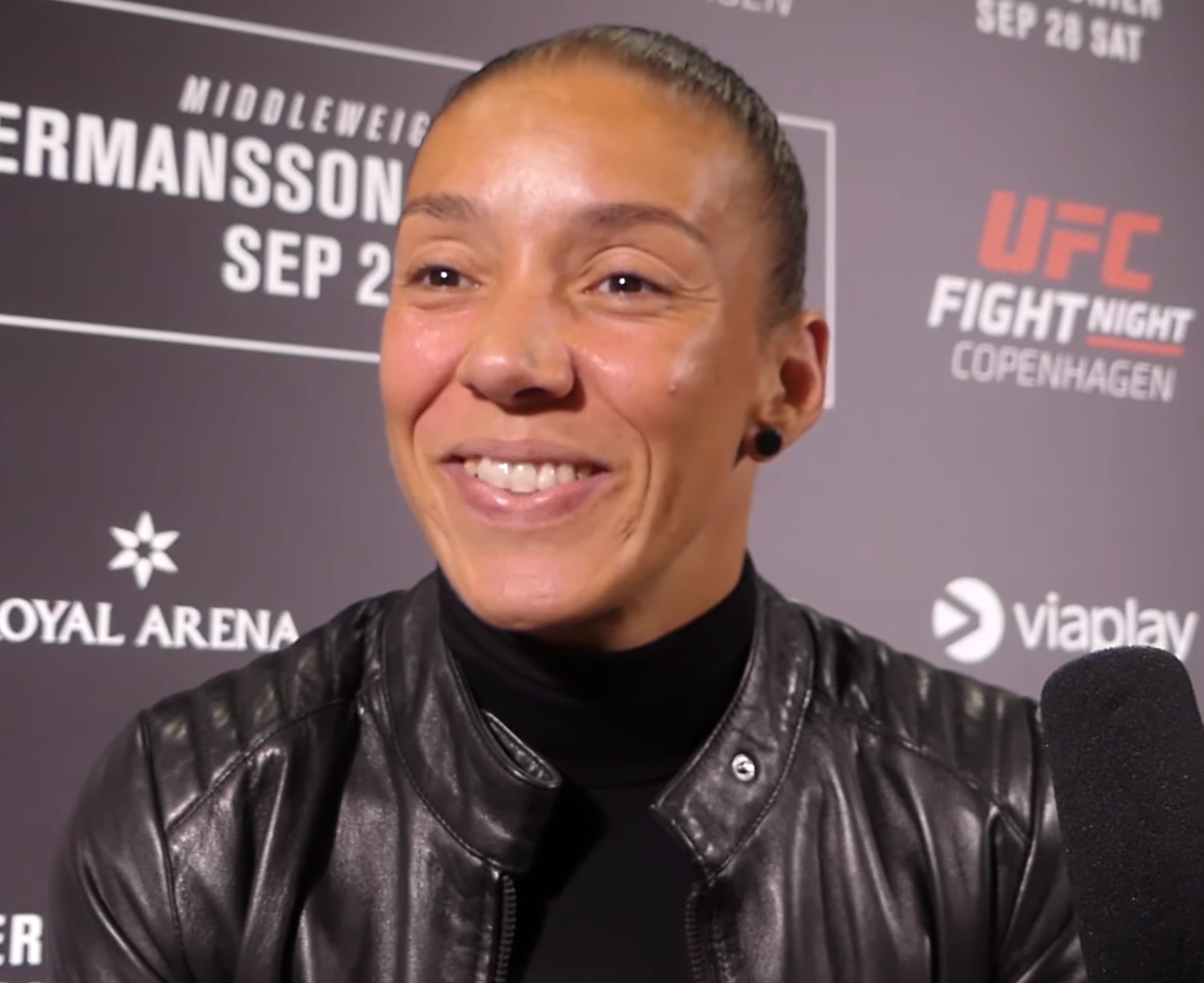
- de Randamie interviewed at UFC Copenhagen in 2019
- Born: April 24, 1984 (age 42); Utrecht, Netherlands
- Other names: The Iron Lady
- Height: 5 ft 9 in (175 cm)
- Weight: 135 lb (61 kg; 9 st 9 lb)
- Division: Bantamweight (135 lbs); Featherweight (145 lbs)
- Reach: 71 in (180 cm)
- Style: Muay Thai, Boxing
- Fighting out of: Utrecht, Netherlands
- Team: CSA Holland
- Years active: 2008–2024

Kickboxing record
- Total: 46
- Wins: 46
- By knockout: 30
- Losses: 0

Mixed martial arts record
- Total: 15
- Wins: 10
- By knockout: 4
- By submission: 1
- By decision: 5
- Losses: 5
- By knockout: 1
- By submission: 1
- By decision: 3

Other information
- Occupation: Police officer in the Netherlands
- Mixed martial arts record from Sherdog

Germaine de Randamie (born April 24, 1984) is a Dutch former mixed martial artist and former Muay Thai kickboxer. As a mixed martial artist, she most notably competed in the Women’s Bantamweight and Featherweight divisions of the Ultimate Fighting Championship (UFC) and was the inaugural UFC Women's Featherweight Champion. de Randamie formerly competed in Strikeforce. As a kickboxer, she was undefeated in 46 sanctioned bouts, and was a four-time world champion in between kickboxing and Muay Thai.

== Kickboxing ==
De Randamie competed in kickboxing with an undefeated record of 46–0 including 30 knockouts.

== Mixed martial arts career ==
=== Early MMA career ===
De Randamie made her mixed martial arts debut on December 19, 2008, at Revolution Fight Club 2. She faced Vanessa Porto and was defeated via submission (armbar) in the first round.

On September 11, 2010, de Randamie earned her first MMA win when she defeated Nikohl Johnson via unanimous decision at Playboy Fight Night 5.

=== Strikeforce ===
De Randamie debuted for Strikeforce on January 29, 2011, at Strikeforce: Diaz vs. Cyborg against Stephanie Webber. She defeated Webber via knockout in the first round.

De Randamie next faced Julia Budd in a rematch from a past Muay Thai bout at Strikeforce Challengers 16: Fodor vs. Terry on June 24, 2011. She was defeated via unanimous decision.

On August 18, 2012, de Randamie faced Hiroko Yamanaka at Strikeforce: Rousey vs. Kaufman. She won the fight via unanimous decision (30–27, 30–27, and 30–27).

=== Ultimate Fighting Championship ===
==== Women's bantamweight ====
On April 18, 2013, it was announced that de Randamie would make her Ultimate Fighting Championship debut on July 27, 2013.

De Randamie debuted against Julie Kedzie at UFC on Fox 8. Relying mostly on clinch work, Germaine won the fight via split decision (30–27, 28–29, and 29–28).

De Randamie next faced Amanda Nunes at UFC Fight Night 31 on November 6, 2013. She lost the fight via TKO in the first round.

De Randamie next faced Larissa Pacheco at UFC 185 on March 14, 2015. She won the fight via TKO in the second round.

==== Women's featherweight ====
De Randamie faced former bantamweight champion, Holly Holm, at UFC 208 for the inaugural UFC Women's Featherweight Championship on February 11, 2017. She won the fight via unanimous decision. At the end of the second and third rounds, de Randamie continued to throw punches after the horn had sounded. The first of those punches was a right hand that visibly wobbled Holm, who had already stopped fighting. The referee, however, did not take a point on either occasion, which affected the result of the fight and drew criticism from UFC president Dana White. Of the media outlets that reported on the fight, 14 of 23 media outlets scored the bout in favour of Holm. After the fight, de Randamie stated that the blows after the horn were unintentional. In contrast, Holm stated that she believed de Randamie's punches after the horn was intentional.

==== Stripping of Women's Featherweight Championship ====
In late May, de Randamie released a statement over social media that she plans to move back to the bantamweight division and rejected the fight with Cris Cyborg due to her repeated transgressions with PEDs. Her decision on not wanting to fight Cyborg drew criticism from many in the media by claiming she was avoiding Cyborg and ignoring her responsibility as a champion to fight any and all challengers. In turn, the promotion stripped her of the title on June 19, 2017. Instead, the newly signed Megan Anderson replaced her and was slated to face Cyborg for the UFC Women's Featherweight Championship at UFC 214, before Anderson herself was then replaced by Invicta Bantamweight Champion Tonya Evinger.

==== Return to bantamweight ====
De Randamie was expected to face Marion Reneau on September 2, 2017, at UFC Fight Night 115. However, de Randamie pulled out citing injury and was replaced by Talita Bernardo.

A bout against Ketlen Vieira was announced for UFC Fight Night 125 on February 3, 2018. However, the bout was soon canceled due to a hand injury sustained by de Randamie.

De Randamie faced former title challenger Raquel Pennington at UFC Fight Night 139 on November 10, 2018. She won the fight via unanimous decision.

On March 8, 2019, de Randamie signed a new 6-fight contract with the UFC.

De Randamie faced Aspen Ladd on July 13, 2019, at UFC Fight Night 155. She won the fight via technical knockout in round one.

De Randamie faced Amanda Nunes in a rematch, on December 14, 2019, at UFC 245 for the UFC Women's Bantamweight Championship. She lost the fight via unanimous decision.

De Randamie faced Julianna Peña on October 4, 2020 at UFC on ESPN: Holm vs. Aldana. De Randamie defeated Peña via guillotine choke, the first submission win in her career. This win earned her the Performance of the Night bonus.

De Randamie was next expected to face Irene Aldana at UFC 268 on November 6, 2021, in New York. However, de Randamie withdrew in early September due to injury.

After a 3-year and six-month hiatus, de Randamie returned to the octagon and faced Norma Dumont on April 6, 2024, at UFC Fight Night 240. She lost the bout by unanimous decision.

De Randamie was scheduled to face Nora Cornolle on September 28, 2024, at UFC Fight Night 243. However, de Randamie withdrew from the fight due to a broken finger and a fractured foot which led her to be replaced by Jacqueline Cavalcanti.

De Randamie was scheduled to face Jacqueline Cavalcanti on January 11, 2025 at UFC Fight Night 249. However, on October 31, 2024, De Randamie announced on her social media that she was retiring from competition.

== Championships and accomplishments ==
=== Kickboxing/Muay Thai ===
- IKCC World champion (2008)
- WIKBA world champion (2005/2006/2008)
- IMTF world champion (2005)
- WPKL World champion (2006)
- WPKL European champion (2003)
- Women's record for consecutive victories (46)

=== Mixed martial arts ===
- Ultimate Fighting Championship
  - UFC Women's Featherweight Championship (One time, inaugural)
  - Performance of the Night (Two times) vs Anna Elmose, Julianna Peña
  - Fastest knockout in UFC Women's Bantamweight division history (16 seconds, tied with Ronda Rousey)
  - UFC.com Awards
    - 2020: Ranked #10 Submission of the Year vs. Julianna Peña

== Personal life ==
De Randamie was born in Utrecht to an Afro-Surinamese father and a Dutch mother. Drag Race Holland alumn Tabitha is her older brother.

De Randamie is a police officer in the Netherlands and worked as a psychiatric nurse prior to becoming a police officer.

De Randamie knocked out Belgian celebrity Tom Waes who was 40 lbs heavier than her in a boxing match.

She currently lives in Utrecht with her girlfriend. In September 2022, de Randamie announced she was pregnant with the couple's first child. On March 20, 2023, de Randamie gave birth to their son.

== Mixed martial arts record ==
Professional record breakdown
15 matches	10 wins	5 losses
By knockout	4	1
By submission	1	1
By decision	5	3

Res.	Record	Opponent	Method	Event	Date	Round	Time	Location	Notes
Loss	10–5	Norma Dumont	Decision (unanimous)	UFC Fight Night: Allen vs. Curtis 2	April 6, 2024	3	5:00	Las Vegas, Nevada, United States	
Win	10–4	Julianna Peña	Technical Submission (guillotine choke)	UFC on ESPN: Holm vs. Aldana	October 4, 2020	3	3:25	Abu Dhabi, United Arab Emirates	Performance of the Night.
Loss	9–4	Amanda Nunes	Decision (unanimous)	UFC 245	December 14, 2019	5	5:00	Las Vegas, Nevada, United States	For the UFC Women's Bantamweight Championship.
Win	9–3	Aspen Ladd	TKO (punch)	UFC Fight Night: de Randamie vs. Ladd	July 13, 2019	1	0:16	Sacramento, California, United States	
Win	8–3	Raquel Pennington	Decision (unanimous)	UFC Fight Night: The Korean Zombie vs. Rodríguez	November 10, 2018	3	5:00	Denver, Colorado, United States	Return to Bantamweight; Pennington missed weight (138 lb).
Win	7–3	Holly Holm	Decision (unanimous)	UFC 208	February 11, 2017	5	5:00	Brooklyn, New York, United States	Won the inaugural UFC Women's Featherweight Championship. Later stripped of the title.
Win	6–3	Anna Elmose	TKO (knee to the body)	UFC Fight Night: Overeem vs. Arlovski	May 8, 2016	1	3:46	Rotterdam, Netherlands	Performance of the Night.
Win	5–3	Larissa Pacheco	TKO (punches)	UFC 185	March 14, 2015	2	2:02	Dallas, Texas, United States	
Loss	4–3	Amanda Nunes	TKO (elbows)	UFC: Fight for the Troops 3	November 6, 2013	1	3:56	Fort Campbell, Kentucky, United States	
Win	4–2	Julie Kedzie	Decision (split)	UFC on Fox: Johnson vs. Moraga	July 27, 2013	3	5:00	Seattle, Washington, United States	Return to Bantamweight.
Win	3–2	Hiroko Yamanaka	Decision (unanimous)	Strikeforce: Rousey vs. Kaufman	August 18, 2012	3	5:00	San Diego, California, United States	
Loss	2–2	Julia Budd	Decision (unanimous)	Strikeforce Challengers: Fodor vs. Terry	June 24, 2011	3	5:00	Kent, Washington, United States	Featherweight debut.
Win	2–1	Stephanie Webber	KO (knee)	Strikeforce: Diaz vs. Cyborg	January 29, 2011	1	4:25	San Jose, California, United States	
Win	1–1	Nikohl Johnson	Decision (unanimous)	Playboy Fight Night 5	September 11, 2010	3	5:00	Los Angeles, California, United States	
Loss	0–1	Vanessa Porto	Submission (armbar)	Revolution Fight Club 2	December 19, 2008	1	3:36	Miami, Florida, United States	Bantamweight debut.

== Pay-per-view bouts ==
No.	Event	Fight	Date	Venue	City	PPV Buys
1.	UFC 208	Holm vs. de Randamie	February 11, 2017	Barclays Center	Brooklyn, New York, United States	200,000

== Kickboxing record (incomplete) ==
Kickboxing record
46 Wins (30 (T)KOs, 16 decisions), 0 Losses
Date	Result	Opponent	Event	Location	Method	Round	Time	Record
May 1, 2011	Win	(Netherlands) Lena Buytendijk	The Next Generation Warriors 5	Utrecht, Netherlands	Decision	3	3:00	42–0
November 30, 2009	Win	(United States) Casey Bohrman	Slamm!! V	Paramaribo, Suriname	KO	2	N/A	41–0
June 20, 2008	Win	(England) Julie Kitchen	N/A	Montego Bay, Jamaica	Decision	3	3:00	40–0
Retained WIKBA World title; Won IKCC World title • Full Thai rules
May 3, 2008	Win	(Canada) Julia Budd	The Next Generation Warriors	Utrecht, Netherlands	TKO (punches)	1	1:57	39–0
March 2, 2008	Win	(Netherlands) Maria Verheijen	M-1 Challenge	Amsterdam, Netherlands	Points	3	3:00	38–0
November 24, 2007	Win	(Italy) Michela Mancini	N/A	Rosmalen, Netherlands	Decision	3	3:00	37–0
September 23, 2007	Win	(Venezuela) Karla Benitez	RINGS Promotion	Utrecht, Netherlands	TKO	N/A	N/A	36–0
July 1, 2007	Win	(Australia) Carly Giumelli	Next Generation Warriors 1	Utrecht, Netherlands	TKO (Low kicks)	2		35–0
May 19, 2007	Win	(Canada) Keri Scarr	Fight Sensation 2	Doetinchem, Netherlands	KO (knee)	1	N/A	34–0
March 25, 2007	Win	(Netherlands) Hatice Özyurt	Rings Holland	Utrecht, Netherlands	Decision	3	3:00	33–0
November 12, 2006	Win	(Poland) Joanna Generowicz	2H2H: Pride & Honor	Rotterdam, Netherlands	TKO	1	N/A	32–0
October 1, 2006	Win	(Switzerland) Jacqueline Fuchs	Slamm: Holland vs Thailand 2	Almere, Netherlands	TKO (retirement)	N/A	N/A	31–0
June 18, 2006	Win	(France) Lucie Bertaud	2H2H: Road to Japan	Amsterdam, Netherlands	TKO	1	N/A	30–0
June 3, 2006	Win	(Italy) Sonja Mirabelli	Gentleman Fight Night 3	Tilburg, Netherlands	KO	1	N/A	29–0
Retained WIKBA World title
March 19, 2006	Win	(Netherlands) Maria Verhijen	Slamm: Holland vs Thailand	Almere, Netherlands	Decision	3	3:00	28–0
December 17, 2005	Win	(Morocco) Chajmaa Bellakhal	Fighting Fist 2005	Arnhem, Netherlands	Decision (Unanimous)	3	3:00	27–0
November 10, 2005	Win	(United States) Angela Rivera-Parr	WCK Muay Thai	Victorville, California, United States	KO (Kick)	1	2:35	26–0
Won WIKBA & IMTF World titles
May 8, 2005	Win	(Netherlands) Denise Ris	WPKL	Amsterdam, Netherlands	KO (Knee)	2		25–0
April 9, 2005	Win	(Japan) Asako Saioka	Muay Thai Champions League 14	Amsterdam, Netherlands	Decision	5	3:00	24–0
November 14, 2004	Win	(Spain) Maria Munoz Garcia	Almere Fight Night 2004	Almere, Netherlands	Decision	3	3:00	23–0
Won WPKL World title
May 29, 2004	Win	(England) Tricia McKeary	N/A	Utrecht, Netherlands	N/A	N/A	N/A	22–0
March 27, 2004	Win	(Portugal) Dina Pedro	Muay Thai League XIII	Rotterdam, Netherlands	Decision	N/A	N/A	21–0
2003	Win	(Russia) N/A	IMTF Championships 2003	Thailand	Points	N/A	N/A	20–0
Won 2003 IMTF Championships tournament
August 23, 2003	Win	(England) Fiona Hayes	N/A	London, England	KO	N/A	N/A	19–0
Retained WPKL European title
February 2, 2003	Win	(Netherlands) Brenda Duijneveld	N/A	Amsterdam, Netherlands	Decision	3	3:00	18–0
Retained WPKL European title
November 3, 2002	Win	(Netherlands) Marjolein Hulshof	Muay Thai Hoofddorp	Hoofddorp, Netherlands	Decision	3	3:00	17–0
Won WPKL European title
April 26, 2002	Win	(Netherlands) Dagmar van Alfen	N/A	Madrid, Spain	Decision	5	3:00	16–0
2001	Win	(Netherlands) Marja Vonk	N/A	Netherlands	N/A	N/A	N/A	15–0
Won WPKL Dutch title
May 27, 2000	Win	(Netherlands) Lesly van Es	N/A	Amsterdam, Netherlands	N/A	N/A	N/A	14–0
Legend: Win Loss Draw/No contest Notes

== See also ==
- List of female mixed martial artists

Awards and achievements
New title	1st UFC Women's Featherweight Champion; February 11, 2017 – June 19, 2017	Vacant Stripped of title after refusing to fight Cristiane Justino due to her repeated drug offenses Title next held by Cristiane Justino
