= Miranga =

Rural district of the municipality of Pojuca, Bahia State, Brazil

Coordinates: 12°22′S 38°15′W

Miranga is a rural district of the municipality of Pojuca, Bahia State, Brazil. It is located 74 km northwest of the state capital Salvador, Bahia, and 22 km north of Pojuca city center.
