= Amanda Nunes =

Brazilian mixed martial artist (born 1988)

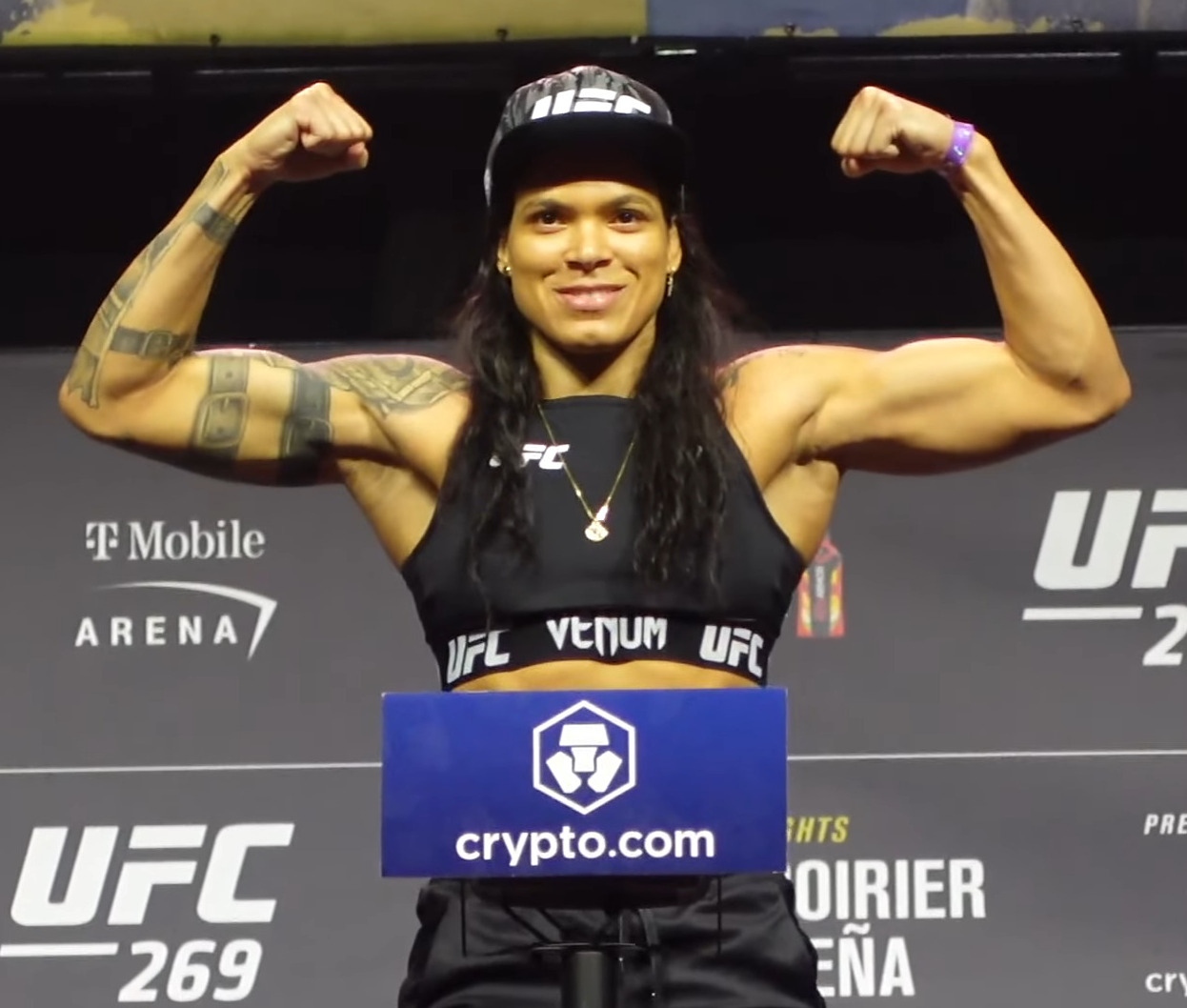
- Nunes in 2021
- Born: Amanda Lourenço Nunes; May 30, 1988 (age 38); Pojuca, Bahia, Brazil
- Other names: The Lioness
- Citizenship: Brazil; United States (since 2025)
- Height: 5 ft 8 in (173 cm)
- Weight: 135 lb (61 kg; 9 st 9 lb)
- Division: Bantamweight (2011–2023); Featherweight (2008–2011, 2018–2023)
- Reach: 175 cm (69 in)
- Fighting out of: Coral Springs, Florida, U.S.
- Team: Team Carvalho (2003–2012); AMA Fight Club (2010–2012); MMA Masters (2012–2014); American Top Team (2014–2022)
- Rank: Black belt in Brazilian Jiu-Jitsu under Daniel Valverde; Brown belt in Judo
- Years active: 2008–present (MMA)

Mixed martial arts record
- Total: 29
- Wins: 23
- By knockout: 13
- By submission: 4
- By decision: 6
- Losses: 6
- By knockout: 2
- By submission: 3
- By decision: 1

Other information
- Spouse: Nina Nunes
- Children: 2
- Mixed martial arts record from Sherdog

Amanda Lourenço Nunes (born May 30, 1988) is a Brazilian-American professional mixed martial artist. She currently competes in the women’s Bantamweight division of the Ultimate Fighting Championship (UFC), where she is the former UFC Women's Featherweight Champion and former two-time UFC Women's Bantamweight Champion. She was ranked #1 in the UFC women's pound-for-pound rankings in 2022.

Nunes is considered by many commentators and publications to be the greatest female mixed martial artist of all time. Nunes is the only woman to become a two-division UFC champion, and the third fighter to hold UFC titles in two weight classes simultaneously, after Conor McGregor and Daniel Cormier. She is also the only fighter in UFC history to defend titles in two different weight classes while actively holding both championships simultaneously.

As of November 17, 2026, she is #10 in the UFC women's pound-for-pound rankings.

== Early life ==
Nunes was born on May 30, 1988, in Pojuca, a small town outside of Salvador, Bahia, Brazil. She has two older sisters. After her parents split up when she was four, Nunes and her sisters remained with their mother. To support the family as a single parent, her mom sold hot dogs, sweets and beauty products alongside her regular job as a school administrative assistant. According to Nunes, her father initially did not support her fighting career, but has since changed course.

Nunes has described her mother as a loving but strict parent. She encouraged Amanda to get involved with sports as a way to deal with her excess energy.

Nunes initially aspired to become a professional soccer player, starting out in elementary school as a player on the local Pojuca team and later on the Salvador team. Eventually, she got the opportunity to try out for the Vitória football club, but was unable to accept due to her mother wanting her to focus on studies instead.

=== Martial arts training ===
Nunes's uncle was a Vale Tudo fighter. Her mother, who herself regularly trained boxing, cornered him during his fights. Nunes first attended capoeira classes at age five, after her school teacher complained that she was too hyperactive in class. She started learning karate at age seven.

My mother used to box, and I followed her footsteps into training. She loves fighting. My uncle used to fight Vale Tudo, and my mother even cornered him in some of his fights. She always says, ‘the first strike has to be yours. She can’t touch you before you touch her. You have to intimidate her.’

— Amanda Nunes

At the age of 16, following her sister Vanessa's invitation to a dojo, she began training in Brazilian jiu-jitsu. At this time, she also got involved with boxing. Despite being the only woman at the gym, she soon started dominating her training partners in sparring. After she had defeated all of her opposition, at age 17, she moved to Salvador to train at the Edson Carvalho academy under the tutelage of his brother, Ricardo Carvalho. There, she also started training in judo. She lived at an apartment with her sister, but because it was too far away from the gym, she accepted her coach's offer to move there. Because she was the only girl, and because the logo of the academy are two lions, her coach and other students started calling her "Leoa" (lioness in Portuguese), a nickname she still uses.

I slept on the mat, I woke up at about 4:30 am to clean the whole gym with the coach. There were some other athletes who lived in the gym as well, but there was only me as a woman. We woke up very early to leave the gym clean for the first jiu-jitsu class, which started at 6 am. I used to live there, so why not help the coach? That is also a part of fighter's life. [...] Today, when I look back, I think it was very worthwhile to go through all of this. I really liked living at the gym, because it was facing Porto da Barra, facing the sea, so I trained, took a shower, went for a walk on the shore, stayed there. It was perfect for me.

— Amanda Nunes

Nunes soon started competing in BJJ tournaments. Among her biggest accomplishments in this sport are gold medal at the Pan American Jiu-Jitsu Championship in 2008 as a blue belt, gold medal at World Jiu-Jitsu Championship in 2009 as a purple belt and becoming a world champion of the North American Grappling Association (NAGA) in the lightweight and absolute divisions in 2012. She currently holds a black belt in BJJ and a brown belt in judo.

== Mixed martial arts career ==
Nunes made her professional debut on March 8, 2008, at Prime MMA Championship 2. She faced Ana Maria and was defeated by armbar submission in the first round.

=== Strikeforce ===
Nunes had won five straight fights, all by knockout prior to making her Strikeforce debut on January 7, 2011, at Strikeforce Challengers: Woodley vs. Saffiedine in Nashville, Tennessee. She defeated Canadian Julia Budd by knockout in just 14 seconds.

Nunes was scheduled to fight Julie Kedzie at Strikeforce: Overeem vs. Werdum on June 18, 2011, in Dallas, Texas. The bout was cancelled after Nunes sustained a foot injury.

Nunes fought Alexis Davis on September 10, 2011, at Strikeforce: Barnett vs. Kharitonov. She lost the fight via TKO late in the second round. In the first round, Nunes started strongly with heavy strikes, but quickly faded. By the second round, Nunes was exhausted from the start of the round. While attempting a takedown she was instantly reversed and Davis was able to obtain full mount to finish Nunes with strikes.

Nunes signed to face Cat Zingano at Strikeforce: Melendez vs. Healy on September 29, 2012, but the event was cancelled when Gilbert Melendez, who was set to defend his title against Pat Healy, sustained a knee injury in training that forced his withdrawal from the card.

=== Invicta FC ===
Nunes was scheduled to face Milana Dudieva at Invicta FC 2: Baszler vs. McMann on July 28, 2012. Dudieva withdrew from the fight due to illness on July 9 and Nunes was then scheduled to face Leslie Smith instead. Smith also withdrew due to an injury and Nunes ultimately faced Raquel Pa'aluhi. Nunes won the fight via technical submission due to a rear-naked choke in the first round.

On January 5, 2013, Nunes returned to Invicta FC to face Sarah D'Alelio at Invicta FC 4: Esparza vs. Hyatt. Nunes lost the fight via unanimous decision.

Nunes was scheduled to face Kaitlin Young at Invicta FC 5: Penne vs. Waterson on April 5, 2013. She withdrew due to an arm injury.

=== Ultimate Fighting Championship ===
Nunes made her Octagon debut against Sheila Gaff at UFC 163 on August 3, 2013, in Brazil. She won the fight via TKO in the first round.

Nunes made her second UFC appearance when she faced Germaine de Randamie at UFC Fight Night 31 on November 6, 2013. She won the fight via TKO in the first round.

For her third fight with the promotion, Nunes was named the injury replacement for Shayna Baszler against Sarah Kaufman at The Ultimate Fighter Nations Finale. Nunes later pulled out of the bout with a dislocated thumb.

Nunes faced Cat Zingano on September 27, 2014, at UFC 178. After nearly finishing Zingano with punches in the first round, she lost the next round before being finished via TKO in the third round.

Nunes faced Shayna Baszler on March 21, 2015, at UFC Fight Night 62. She won the fight via TKO in the first round.

Nunes faced Sara McMann on August 8, 2015, at UFC Fight Night 73. She won the fight via a rear-naked choke submission in the first round, after knocking her opponent down with a three punch combination.

Nunes faced Valentina Shevchenko on March 5, 2016, at UFC 196. She won the fight by unanimous decision (29–28, 29–27, and 29–27).

==== Bantamweight and Featherweight Champion ====
After amassing a three-fight win streak, Nunes earned her first title shot in the UFC. She faced Miesha Tate for the UFC Women's Bantamweight Championship on July 9, 2016, at UFC 200. Nunes stunned Tate early on with knees and punches and then won the fight by submission (rear-naked choke) in the first round. Her victory made her the first openly gay UFC champion.

On December 30, 2016, Nunes made her first title defense against returning MMA superstar Ronda Rousey in the main event at UFC 207. Nunes won the fight via TKO due to punches 48 seconds into the first round.

For her second title defense, Nunes was scheduled to face Valentina Shevchenko in a rematch at UFC 213 on July 8, 2017. The pair originally fought at UFC 196, with Nunes winning by unanimous decision. Nunes was hospitalized the morning of the fight with chronic sinusitis and the fight was cancelled. Joanna Jędrzejczyk offered to replace Nunes, but the Nevada State Athletic Commission could not clear her on such short notice. Nunes instead fought Shevchenko at UFC 215 on September 9 in Edmonton, Alberta. Nunes won the closely contested fight by split decision. Out of 22 media outlets, 10 scored it for Nunes, 10 for Shevchenko, and 2 scored it a draw.

Nunes faced Raquel Pennington on May 12, 2018, at UFC 224. After a dominant performance, Nunes won the fight via TKO in round five. This was the first UFC event headlined by two openly gay fighters.

Nunes moved up in weight to face Cris Cyborg for the UFC Women's Featherweight Championship on December 29, 2018, at UFC 232. Nunes knocked Cyborg out in 51 seconds of the first round to become the new UFC Women's Featherweight Champion. This made her the first woman in UFC to hold championship belts in different divisions simultaneously. This win also earned her the Performance of the Night award.

Nunes returned to bantamweight to make her fourth title defense against former champion Holly Holm on July 6, 2019, at UFC 239. She won the fight via knockout in round one after dropping Holm with a head kick and following up with punches. This win earned her the Performance of the Night award.

Nunes faced Germaine de Randamie in a rematch on December 14, 2019, at UFC 245 to defend her UFC Women's Bantamweight Championship. After outgrappling her opponent in every round, she won the fight via unanimous decision (49–44, 49–46, and 49–45). This win meant Nunes had the most wins in women's title fights in the UFC, with seven such wins.

Nunes was expected to face Felicia Spencer on May 9, 2020, at then UFC 250. On April 9, Dana White, president of the UFC announced that this event was postponed The bout eventually took place on June 6, 2020, at UFC 250. Nunes won via unanimous decision (50–44, 50–44, and 50–45).

Nunes was expected to defend her featherweight title against Megan Anderson in December 2020 at UFC 256. It was announced on November 9 that Nunes pulled out due to an undisclosed injury and the bout was postponed to 2021. The pairing was rescheduled for March 6, 2021 at UFC 259. Nunes won the fight via triangle armbar in round one.

Nunes was expected to defend her bantamweight title on August 7, 2021, at UFC 265 against Julianna Peña. Nunes tested positive for COVID-19 on July 29 and the bout was cancelled. The fight was rescheduled and eventually took place at UFC 269 on December 11, 2021. After dominating the first round, Nunes was outstruck in the second round, and eventually submitted via rear-naked choke, losing her bantamweight championship in a massive upset.

On February 5, 2022, it was announced that Nunes and Julianna Peña will be the coaches for The Ultimate Fighter 30 at ESPN+ and the show featured heavyweight and women's flyweight contestants.

A rematch against Julianna Peña for the UFC Women's Bantamweight title took place on July 30, 2022, at UFC 277. Nunes recaptured the title in a 5-round dominant unanimous decision victory over Peña, and became the first person in UFC history, of either gender to become double champ twice. She also became the first fighter to win a title in the weight class below the one in which they were currently holding the title. Nunes received "Fan Bonus of the Night" awards paid in bitcoin of US$30,000 for first place for this fight.

==== Temporary retirement ====
A trilogy bout was scheduled against Julianna Peña on June 10, 2023, at UFC 289. On May 2, 2023, it was announced that Peña had suffered broken ribs during training camp and would be unable to compete. Irene Aldana agreed to replace Peña at the event. Nunes won the fight via a dominant unanimous decision, and announced her retirement from active competition during the post-fight interview.

==== Hall of Fame ====
During UFC 314's broadcast in April 2025, Nunes was announced as the next "modern wing" UFC Hall of Fame inductee during International Fight Week festivities in Las Vegas that June.

==== Comeback ====
On June 5, 2025, after spending two years in retirement, Nunes announced that she would be returning to the UFC against the winner of Kayla Harrison vs. Julianna Peña.

Nunes was scheduled to compete for the bantamweight championship against current champion Kayla Harrison on January 24, 2026 at UFC 324. However, Harrison withdrew from the bout after being diagnosed with herniated discs in her neck, which required surgery. The fight is expected to be rescheduled for a later date. The bout was reportedly linked to September 19, 2026 at UFC 331 but was once again postponed. The bout ended up taking place on November 14, 2026 at UFC 334. Nunes lost the fight via a rear-naked choke submission in the fourth round.

== Personal life ==
Nunes is the first openly lesbian UFC champion. She is married to former UFC fighter Nina Nunes (née Ansaroff), who competed in the strawweight division. She credits her UFC success to their relationship. On September 24, 2020, her wife gave birth to the couple's first child, a daughter. On November 6, 2023, Nunes announced via Instagram that she and her wife welcomed their second daughter, born on November 1, 2023.

In 2019, Nunes was featured in ESPN The Magazine's The Body Issue, including an appearance on the cover.

== Championships and accomplishments ==
- Ultimate Fighting Championship
  - UFC Hall of Fame (Modern wing, Class of 2025)
  - UFC Women's Bantamweight Championship (two times)
    - Six successful title defenses (overall)
      - Five successful title defenses (first reign)
      - One successful title defense (second reign)
    - Tied (Valentina Shevchenko) for most wins in UFC title fights amongst women (11)
    - Most wins in UFC Women's Bantamweight Championship fights (8)
    - Most bouts in UFC Women's Bantamweight Championship fights (10)
    - First woman in UFC to win two titles (bantamweight and featherweight) and to also hold them simultaneously
    - First and only UFC fighter to defend titles in two divisions while holding both titles simultaneously
    - Sixth multi-divisional champion in UFC and third to hold two titles simultaneously (after Daniel Cormier and Conor McGregor)
    - First and only fighter to retire as multi-division champion in UFC history
    - Fourth longest single UFC title reign of all time (1981 days) (behind Demetrious Johnson, Georges St-Pierre and Anderson Silva)
  - UFC Women’s Featherweight Championship (one time)
    - Two successful title defenses
    - Tied (Cris Cyborg) for most wins in UFC Women's Featherweight Championship fights (3)
    - Longest combined UFC title reign of all time (3940 days)
    - Second most combined title defenses by a woman in UFC history (8) (behind Valentina Shevchenko)
    - Tied (Anderson Silva & Valentina Shevchenko) for fourth most title fight wins in UFC history (11)
  - Performance of the Night (five times) vs. Sara McMann, Miesha Tate, Ronda Rousey, Cris Cyborg and Holly Holm
    - Tied (Ronda Rousey) for the second most Performance of the Night bonuses in UFC Women's history (5)
    - Tied (Irene Aldana) for third most Post-Fight bonuses in UFC Women's Bantamweight division history (4)
  - Second most wins in UFC Women's history (16)
  - Tied (Gillian Robertson) for most finishes in UFC Women's history (10)
  - Tied (Anthony Johnson, Charles Oliveira and Andrei Arlovski) for fifth most first-round finishes in UFC history (9)
  - Most knockouts in UFC Women's history (7)
  - Most consecutive wins in UFC Women's history (12)
  - Most knockout wins in UFC Women's Bantamweight division history (6)
  - Most finishes in UFC Women's Bantamweight division history (8)
  - Most wins in UFC Women's Bantamweight division history (13)
  - Most consecutive wins in UFC Women's Bantamweight division history (9)
  - Most knockdowns in UFC Women's Bantamweight division history (6)
    - Most knockdowns in a bout in UFC Women's Bantamweight division history (3 vs Julianna Peña 2)
  - Most takedowns in UFC Women's Bantamweight division history (34)
    - Most takedowns landed in a bout in UFC Women's Bantamweight division history (8 vs Germaine de Randamie)
  - Longest win streak against (current, former or future) UFC Champions (8)
  - Tied (Cris Cyborg) for most consecutive wins in UFC Women's Featherweight division history (3)
  - Second most bouts in UFC Women's Bantamweight division history (16)
  - Most top position time in UFC Women's Bantamweight division history (1:00:42)
  - Second most control time in UFC Women's Bantamweight division history (1:05:42)
  - Second highest striking differential in UFC Women's Bantamweight division history (1.7)
  - Third most total fight time in UFC Women's Bantamweight division history (3:12:59)
  - Fourth most significant strikes landed in UFC Women's Bantamweight division history (804)
    - Fifth most total strikes landed in UFC Women's Bantamweight division history (1161)
  - Holds wins over eight current or former UFC champions — Miesha Tate, Ronda Rousey, Valentina Shevchenko (twice), Holly Holm, Germaine de Randamie (twice), Cris Cyborg, Julianna Peña and Raquel Pennington
  - UFC.com Awards
    - 2013: Ranked #9 Import of the Year
    - 2018: Ranked #2 Fighter of the Year & Ranked #4 Knockout of the Year vs. Cris Cyborg
    - 2021: Ranked #5 Submission of the Year vs. Megan Anderson
- Yahoo Sports
  - 2010s Female MMA Fighter of the Decade
- The Athletic
  - 2010s Women's Bantamweight Fighter of the Decade
- BJPenn.com
  - 2010s #8 Ranked Fighter of the Decade
- Bloody Elbow
  - 2010s Women's Bantamweight Fighter of the Decade
- Forbes
  - 2016 UFC Fighter of the Year
- MMA Junkie
  - 2015 August Submission of the Month vs. Sara McMann
  - 2016 #6 Ranked Fighter of the Year
  - 2018 Female Fighter of the Year
  - 2019 Female Fighter of the Year
  - 2010s #6 Ranked Fighter of the Decade
- Combat Press
  - 2018 Upset of the Year vs. Cris Cyborg
  - 2018 Female Fighter of the Year
  - 2019 Female Fighter of the Year
- Cageside Press
  - 2019 Female Fighter of the Year
- MMA Weekly
  - 2018 Knockout of the Year vs. Cris Cyborg
- Equality California
  - 2016 Equality Visibility Award
- MMADNA.nl
  - 2016 Female Fighter of the Year
  - 2018 Female Fighter of the Year
- World MMA Awards
  - 2016 Female Fighter of the Year
  - 2018 Female Fighter of the Year
  - 2018 Knockout of the Year vs. Cris Cyborg at UFC 232
  - 2018 Upset of the Year vs. Cris Cyborg at UFC 232
  - 2019 Female Fighter of the Year
- Fight Matrix
  - 2016 Female Fighter of the Year
  - 2018 Female Fighter of the Year
  - 2019 Female Fighter of the Year tied with Valentina Shevchenko
- CBS Sports
  - 2016 #5 Ranked UFC Fighter of the Year
  - 2018 UFC Fighter of the Year
- theScore
  - 2016 Fighter of the Year with Cody Garbrandt
- Sports Illustrated
  - 2016 #3 Ranked Fighter of the Year
- MMA Fighting
  - 2022 First Team MMA All-Star

== Mixed martial arts record ==
Professional record breakdown
29 matches	23 wins	6 losses
By knockout	13	2
By submission	4	3
By decision	6	1

Res.	Record	Opponent	Method	Event	Date	Round	Time	Location	Notes
Loss	23–6	Kayla Harrison	Submission (rear-naked choke)	UFC 334	November 14, 2026	4	1:29	New York City, New York, United States	For the UFC Women's Bantamweight Championship.
Win	23–5	Irene Aldana	Decision (unanimous)	UFC 289	June 10, 2023	5	5:00	Vancouver, British Columbia, Canada	Defended the UFC Women's Bantamweight Championship. Vacated title on June 20, 2023.
Win	22–5	Julianna Peña	Decision (unanimous)	UFC 277	July 30, 2022	5	5:00	Dallas, Texas, United States	Won the UFC Women's Bantamweight Championship.
Loss	21–5	Julianna Peña	Submission (rear-naked choke)	UFC 269	December 11, 2021	2	3:26	Las Vegas, Nevada, United States	Lost the UFC Women's Bantamweight Championship.
Win	21–4	Megan Anderson	Submission (reverse triangle armbar)	UFC 259	March 6, 2021	1	2:03	Las Vegas, Nevada, United States	Defended the UFC Women's Featherweight Championship. Vacated title on June 20, 2023.
Win	20–4	Felicia Spencer	Decision (unanimous)	UFC 250	June 6, 2020	5	5:00	Las Vegas, Nevada, United States	Defended the UFC Women's Featherweight Championship.
Win	19–4	Germaine de Randamie	Decision (unanimous)	UFC 245	December 14, 2019	5	5:00	Las Vegas, Nevada, United States	Defended the UFC Women's Bantamweight Championship.
Win	18–4	Holly Holm	TKO (head kick and punches)	UFC 239	July 6, 2019	1	4:10	Las Vegas, Nevada, United States	Defended the UFC Women's Bantamweight Championship. Performance of the Night.
Win	17–4	Cris Cyborg	KO (punch)	UFC 232	December 29, 2018	1	0:51	Inglewood, California, United States	Won the UFC Women's Featherweight Championship. Performance of the Night.
Win	16–4	Raquel Pennington	TKO (elbows and punches)	UFC 224	May 12, 2018	5	2:36	Rio de Janeiro, Brazil	Defended the UFC Women's Bantamweight Championship.
Win	15–4	Valentina Shevchenko	Decision (split)	UFC 215	September 9, 2017	5	5:00	Edmonton, Alberta, Canada	Defended the UFC Women's Bantamweight Championship.
Win	14–4	Ronda Rousey	TKO (punches)	UFC 207	December 30, 2016	1	0:48	Las Vegas, Nevada, United States	Defended the UFC Women's Bantamweight Championship. Performance of the Night.
Win	13–4	Miesha Tate	Submission (rear-naked choke)	UFC 200	July 9, 2016	1	3:16	Las Vegas, Nevada, United States	Won the UFC Women's Bantamweight Championship. Performance of the Night.
Win	12–4	Valentina Shevchenko	Decision (unanimous)	UFC 196	March 5, 2016	3	5:00	Las Vegas, Nevada, United States	
Win	11–4	Sara McMann	Submission (rear-naked choke)	UFC Fight Night: Teixeira vs. Saint Preux	August 8, 2015	1	2:53	Nashville, Tennessee, United States	Performance of the Night.
Win	10–4	Shayna Baszler	TKO (leg kick)	UFC Fight Night: Maia vs. LaFlare	March 21, 2015	1	1:56	Rio de Janeiro, Brazil	
Loss	9–4	Cat Zingano	TKO (elbows and punches)	UFC 178	September 27, 2014	3	1:21	Las Vegas, Nevada, United States	
Win	9–3	Germaine de Randamie	TKO (elbows)	UFC: Fight for the Troops 3	November 6, 2013	1	3:56	Fort Campbell, Kentucky, United States	
Win	8–3	Sheila Gaff	TKO (punches and elbows)	UFC 163	August 3, 2013	1	2:08	Rio de Janeiro, Brazil	
Loss	7–3	Sarah D'Alelio	Decision (unanimous)	Invicta FC 4	January 5, 2013	3	5:00	Kansas City, Kansas, United States	Nunes was deducted one point due to an illegal upkick.
Win	7–2	Raquel Pa'aluhi	Technical Submission (rear-naked choke)	Invicta FC 2	July 28, 2012	1	2:24	Kansas City, Kansas, United States	
Loss	6–2	Alexis Davis	TKO (punches)	Strikeforce: Barnett vs. Kharitonov	September 10, 2011	2	4:53	Cincinnati, Ohio, United States	Bantamweight debut.
Win	6–1	Julia Budd	KO (punches)	Strikeforce Challengers: Woodley vs. Saffiedine	January 7, 2011	1	0:14	Nashville, Tennessee, United States	
Win	5–1	Ediane Gomes	TKO (punches)	Bitetti Combat 6	February 25, 2010	2	3:00	Brasília, Brazil	
Win	4–1	Vanessa Porto	TKO (corner stoppage)	Samurai Fight Combat 2	December 12, 2009	2	5:00	Curitiba, Brazil	
Win	3–1	Deise Lee Rocha	TKO (punches)	Samurai Fight Combat 1	September 12, 2009	1	1:08	Curitiba, Brazil	
Win	2–1	Ana Maria	TKO (punches)	Prime MMA Championship 3	July 1, 2008	1	0:10	Salvador, Brazil	
Win	1–1	Paty Barbosa	TKO (corner stoppage)	Demo Fight 3	May 24, 2008	1	0:11	Salvador, Brazil	
Loss	0–1	Ana Maria	Submission (armbar)	Prime MMA Championship 2	March 8, 2008	1	0:35	Salvador, Brazil	Featherweight debut.

== Pay-per-view bouts ==
No.	Event	Fight	Date	City	Venue	PPV Buys
1.	UFC 200	Tate vs. Nunes	July 9, 2016	Paradise, Nevada, United States	T-Mobile Arena	1,009,000
2.	UFC 207	Nunes vs. Rousey	December 30, 2016	Paradise, Nevada, United States	T-Mobile Arena	1,100,000
3.	UFC 215	Nunes vs. Shevchenko 2	September 9, 2017	Edmonton, Alberta, Canada	Rogers Place	100,000
4.	UFC 224	Nunes vs. Pennington	May 12, 2018	Rio de Janeiro, Brazil	Jeunesse Arena	85,000
5.	UFC 250	Nunes vs. Spencer	June 6, 2020	Enterprise, Nevada, United States	UFC Apex	85,000
6.	UFC 277	Peña vs. Nunes 2	July 30, 2022	Dallas, Texas, United States	American Airlines Center	Not Disclosed
7.	UFC 289	Nunes vs. Aldana	June 10, 2023	Vancouver, British Columbia, Canada	Rogers Arena	Not Disclosed

== See also ==
- List of current UFC fighters
- List of female mixed martial artists
- List of UFC champions
- Double champions in MMA
- UFC Hall of Fame

Achievements
Preceded by Miesha Tate	4th UFC Women's Bantamweight Champion; July 9, 2016 – December 11, 2021	Succeeded by Julianna Peña
Preceded by Julianna Peña	6th UFC Women's Bantamweight Champion; July 30, 2022 – June 20, 2023; Retired	Succeeded by Raquel Pennington
Preceded by Cris Cyborg	3rd UFC Featherweight Champion; December 29, 2018 – June 20, 2023; Retired	Title defunct
Awards
Preceded by Holly Holm	World MMA Female Fighter of the Year; 2016	Succeeded by Rose Namajunas
Preceded by Rose Namajunas	World MMA Female Fighter of the Year; 2018, 2019–20	Succeeded by Rose Namajunas
Preceded by Francis Ngannou	World MMA Knockout of the Year; 2018 vs. Cris Cyborg at UFC 232	Succeeded by Jorge Masvidal
Preceded by Rose Namajunas	World MMA Upset of the Year; 2018 vs. Cris Cyborg at UFC 232	Succeeded by Alexander Volkanovski
UFC records
New record	Only female double champion December 29, 2018 – present Bantamweight, Featherweight	Incumbent
New record	Women's longest combined pound-for-pound reign January 27, 2020 – present 1,009 days	Incumbent
