= Colby Covington =

American mixed martial artist (born 1988)

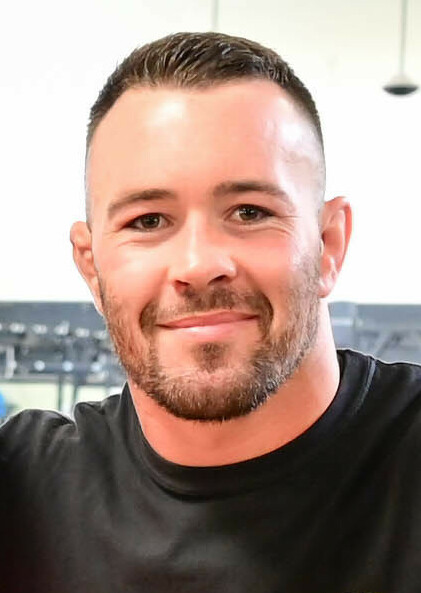
- Covington in 2022
- Born: Colby Ray Covington; February 22, 1988 (age 38); Clovis, California, U.S.
- Nickname: Chaos
- Height: 5 ft 11 in (180 cm)
- Weight: 170 lb (77 kg; 12 st 2 lb)
- Division: Welterweight
- Reach: 72 in (183 cm)
- Stance: Southpaw
- Fighting out of: Miami, Florida, U.S.
- Team: MMA Masters (2020–present) American Top Team (2011–2020)
- Rank: Black belt in Brazilian jiu-jitsu under Daniel Valverde
- Wrestling: NCAA Division I Wrestling
- Years active: 2007–2011 (Collegiate wrestling); 2012–2024 (MMA); 2026–present (wrestling)

Mixed martial arts record
- Total: 22
- Wins: 17
- By knockout: 4
- By submission: 4
- By decision: 9
- Losses: 5
- By knockout: 2
- By submission: 1
- By decision: 2

Other information
- University: Oregon State University
- Website: colbychaos.com
- Mixed martial arts record from Sherdog
Medal record
Men's submission grappling
Representing the United States
World Championships
Gold medal – first place	2013 London	77 kg (No-Gi)
Men's collegiate wrestling
Representing Iowa Central CC
NJCAA Championships
Gold medal – first place	2007 Rochester	165 lb
Representing the Oregon State Beavers
Pac-10 Championships
Gold medal – first place	2010 Davis	174 lb
Gold medal – first place	2011 Corvallis	174 lb

Colby Ray Covington (born February 22, 1988) is an American freestyle wrestler and former professional mixed martial artist who currently competes in Real American Freestyle and is the inaugural RAF Cruiserweight Crossover Champion. He formerly competed in the Welterweight division of the Ultimate Fighting Championship (UFC), where he is a former Interim UFC Welterweight Champion.

== Early life ==
Covington was born in Clovis, California, on February 22, 1988. The family moved from California to Oregon when he was eight years old. His father was a wrestler during his time at the Oregon Institute of Technology and Southern Oregon University.

== Wrestling career ==
As a wrestler at Thurston High School in Springfield, Oregon, Covington lettered all four years and won the 171 lb state championship as a senior in 2006. He committed to Arizona State University but his test scores were too low, so he went to Iowa Central Community College, where he won the 2007 165 lb national junior college wrestling title as a true freshman with a 34–0 record. His roommate at the time was future UFC champion Jon Jones.

Following his championship season at Iowa Central, Covington transferred to the wrestling program at the University of Iowa. On August 10, 2007, he was arrested for eluding police and driving under the influence, having registered a BAC of 0.255, over three times the legal limit of 0.08. He later said, "That was a real all-time low in my life, something I really wish I could take back." Due to his arrest, Covington was suspended from the Hawkeyes for a year and saw limited time the next season. He looked for a fresh start, and former Hawkeyes coach Jim Zalesky convinced Covington to transfer to Oregon State University.

During his time at OSU, Covington qualified for the NCAA tournament as a junior and as a senior, placing fifth as a senior and earning All-American honors. He also was a two-time Pac-10 Conference champion at 174-pounds. He was cited for fourth-degree assault stemming from an incident on May 23, 2010, in which he was accused of punching two men after a verbal altercation. The Benton County District Attorney's Office did not pursue charges against Covington over the incident.

Covington graduated with a bachelor's degree in sociology in 2011. After graduation, he continued to compete in wrestling and grappling, winning a gold medal at the 2013 FILA Grappling no-gi world championships.

He debuted for Real American Freestyle (RAF) at RAF 05 on January 10, 2026, defeating Luke Rockhold. The following month, he joined their sister company Real American Beer as a partner and investor.

Covington defeated Dillon Danis in the co-main event of RAF 07 on March 28, 2026. He defeated Chris Weidman in the co-main event of RAF 09 on May 30, 2026. He defeated Arman Tsarukyan in the main event of RAF 11 for the inaugural RAF Cruiserweight Crossover Championship on July 18, 2026. This fight earned him a Match of the Night award.

Covington defended his title against Belal Muhammad in the main event on September 19, 2026 at RAF 13. He won the match by technical fall in the second round.

Covington faced Raul Rosas Jr. at Hype Italy on November 3, 2026 in a submission-only grappling match, losing via a rear-naked choke submission in 43 seconds.

Covington was scheduled to defend his title against Khamzat Chimaev on November 14, 2026 at RAF Abu Dhabi. However, during fight week, Covington withdrew due to an injury and was replaced by former UFC Middleweight Champion Chris Weidman.

== Poker career ==
Outside combat sports, Covington is an active live tournament poker player, with $448,061 in earnings from 86 recorded cashes on The Hendon Mob as of June 2026. He has said he began playing online poker while on the University of Iowa wrestling team during the 2008–09 season, and his first recorded live tournament cash came in South Florida in 2012. His most notable win came in August 2022, when he took the $1,100 Pot-Limit Omaha Hi-Lo event at the Seminole Hard Rock Poker Open for $25,875, while his biggest single cash is $70,930 for 10th place in a $10,000 No-Limit Hold'em event at WSOP Paradise in December 2024. He has not won a World Series of Poker bracelet, and his best Main Event finish is 1,077th in 2024.

== Mixed martial arts career ==
=== Early career ===
After completing his collegiate wrestling career in 2011, Covington was one of a number of athletes recruited by Dan Lambert to American Top Team to improve the gym's wrestling talent. Covington soon began his professional career and compiled a record of 5–0 before signing with the UFC in the summer of 2014.

=== Ultimate Fighting Championship (2014–2026) ===
Covington made his promotional debut against Anying Wang on August 23, 2014, at UFC Fight Night 48. He won the fight by TKO via punches in the closing seconds of the first round.

Covington fought Wagner Silva on November 8, 2014, at UFC Fight Night 56. He won the fight via submission in the third round.

Covington next faced Mike Pyle on May 23, 2015, at UFC 187, replacing an injured Sean Spencer. He won the fight via unanimous decision.

Covington faced Warlley Alves on December 12, 2015, at UFC 194. He lost the fight via submission in the first round.

Covington was expected to compete against Alex Garcia on June 18, 2016, at UFC Fight Night 89. However, Garcia was pulled from the fight on June 10 for undisclosed reasons and replaced by promotional newcomer Jonathan Meunier. Covington won the fight via submission in the third round.

Covington next faced promotional newcomer Max Griffin on August 20, 2016, at UFC 202. He won the fight via TKO in the third round.

Covington's next bout was against Bryan Barberena on December 17, 2016, at UFC on Fox 22. He won the fight via unanimous decision.

Covington faced Dong Hyun Kim on June 17, 2017, at UFC Fight Night 111. He won the fight via unanimous decision.

As the final fight of his prevailing contract, Covington fought Demian Maia on October 28, 2017, at UFC Fight Night 119. He won the fight via unanimous decision.

==== Interim UFC Welterweight Champion ====
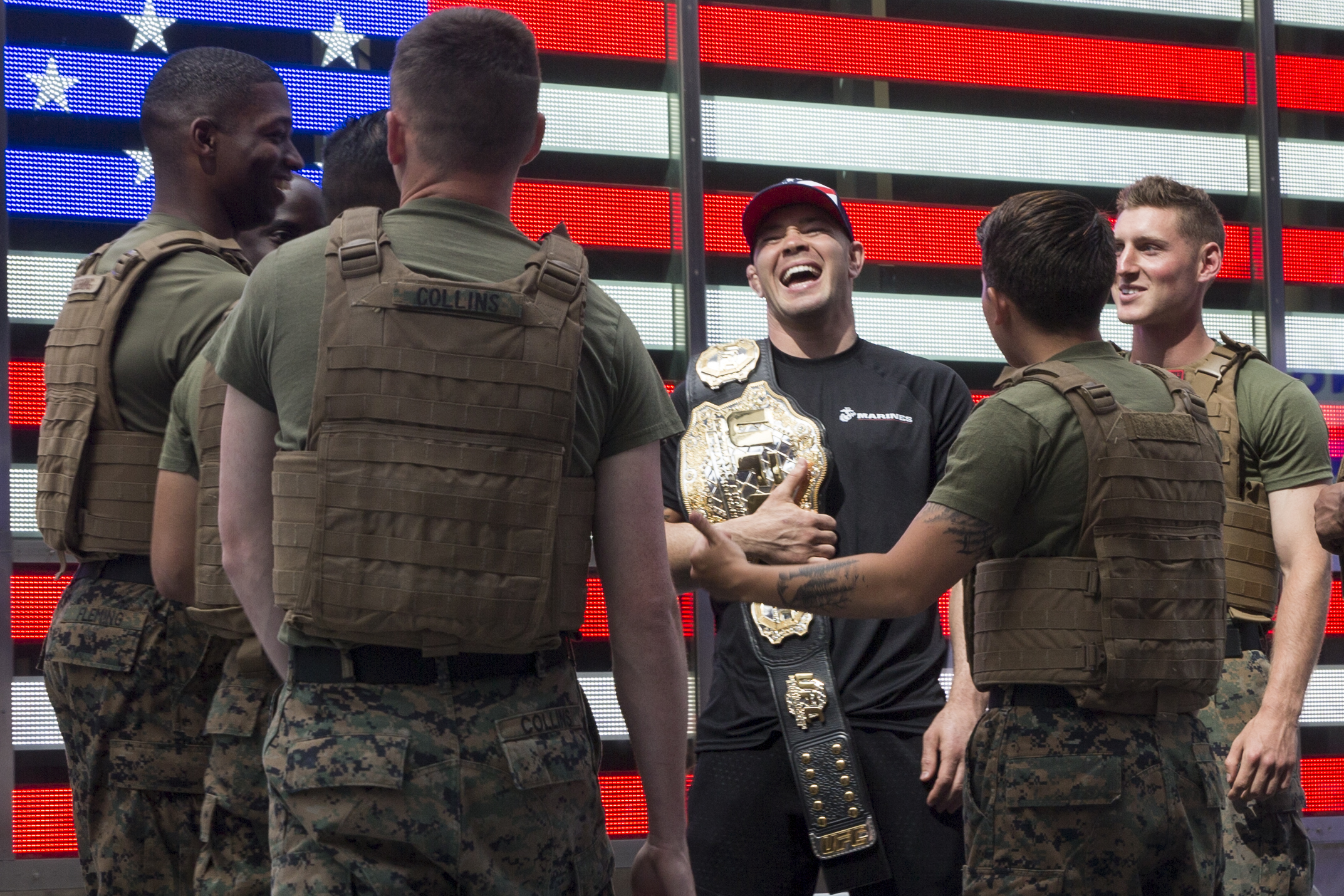
Covington with his Interim UFC Welterweight belt in 2019

Covington fought Rafael dos Anjos on June 9, 2018, at UFC 225 for the Interim UFC Welterweight Championship. He won the fight via unanimous decision.

Covington was briefly linked to a title unification bout with the then champion Tyron Woodley on September 8, 2018, at UFC 228. However, Covington was unable to compete on that date due to recent nasal surgery. As a result, UFC officials turned their attention to arranging a bout between Woodley and Darren Till to fill the headlining spot. In turn, promotional officials indicated on July 24 that Covington would be stripped of the Interim UFC Welterweight Championship, once the bout between Woodley and Till took place.

Covington returned to face Robbie Lawler in the main event of UFC on ESPN 5 on August 3, 2019. He won the fight via a lopsided unanimous decision, setting a record for the most strikes thrown in a UFC bout, with 541 strikes.

Covington faced Kamaru Usman for the UFC Welterweight Championship on December 14, 2019, at UFC 245. Covington was finished by technical knockout in the fifth round. This fight earned him his first post–fight bonus in the UFC for Fight of the Night. Going into the final round, one judge had Covington winning 39–37, another had it tied at 38–38, and the other had it 39–37 in favor of Usman.

After a long-lasting, public feud and trash talking between Covington and other American Top Team members – most notably Dustin Poirier, Jorge Masvidal and Joanna Jędrzejczyk – Covington eventually parted ways with his first mixed martial arts gym in May 2020.

Covington headlined UFC Fight Night 178 against his long-time rival Tyron Woodley on September 19, 2020. After dominating his opponent for four rounds, the bout was called as a technical knockout when Woodley suffered a rib injury.

Covington rematched Kamaru Usman for the UFC Welterweight Championship on November 6, 2021, at UFC 268. Despite a close bout, Covington lost via unanimous decision.

==== Post-championship ====
Covington faced Jorge Masvidal on March 5, 2022, at UFC 272. He won the fight via unanimous decision in dominant fashion. This fight earned him the Fight of the Night award.

Covington successfully weighed in on March 17, 2023, as the backup for the welterweight title fight at UFC 286 in London, England.

After sitting out for nearly two years, Covington returned to face Leon Edwards for the UFC Welterweight Championship on December 16, 2023 in the main event at UFC 296. Covington broke his foot in the first minute of the bout, and eventually lost via unanimous decision.

Covington stepped in as a replacement for Ian Machado Garry, to face Joaquin Buckley on December 14, 2024, at UFC on ESPN 63. Covington lost the fight by technical knockout as a result of a doctor stoppage due to a cut above his eye in the third round.

On May 19, 2026, Covington officially notified the UFC of his retirement from mixed martial arts.

== Fighting style ==
As an NCAA Division I All-American and a two-time Pac-10 champion as a collegiate wrestler, Covington heavily utilizes wrestling and grappling in mixed martial arts. He aims to take his opponents down and control them on the ground, where he looks for ground-and-pound. If unsuccessful on his initial take down attempt, he will chain it into further take down attempts, forcing his opponent to defend and tiring them out in the process. Covington is renowned for his cardio and is capable of maintaining an intense pace over five rounds.

While standing, Covington primarily fights out of a southpaw stance, and his striking arsenal features a variety of punches and kicks. He often purposely overextends on his punches to transition from striking to a takedown attempt. His stand-up game focuses on volume and forward pressure. In his win over Robbie Lawler in 2019, Covington threw 541 strikes, which was a UFC record until surpassed by Max Holloway's 746 attempted strikes in his fight against Calvin Kattar in 2021.

=== Brazilian jiu-jitsu lineage ===
Kano Jigoro → Tomita Tsunejiro → Mitsuyo Maeda → Carlos Gracie → Reyson Gracie → Osvaldo Alves → Daniel Valverde → Colby Covington

== Professional wrestling appearances ==
In August 2017, Covington began making appearances in Impact Wrestling (known at the time as Global Force Wrestling), representing American Top Team, where he got involved in the storyline with Lashley. Throughout the month, Lashley was conflicted on whether he should combine his two careers together, or quit wrestling and focus on his MMA career; he would eventually side with ATT. On August 17, at Destination X, some members of ATT were ringside to support Lashley for his match against Matt Sydal. Post-match, Covington attacked referee Brian Hebner with a rear-naked choke, which Lashley had to call off, before he and ATT left the arena. On the August 24 episode of Impact! (taped August 17), they were again at ringside to support Lashley in a twenty-man gauntlet match for the GFW Impact World Heavyweight Championship, which was eventually won by Eli Drake. On 5 November, at Bound for Glory, Covington appeared as a cornerman, as Lashley and King Mo defeated Moose and Stephan Bonnar in a six sides of steel match. In the build-up to the event, he hired Stevie Richards to be his strength and conditioning coach. The event marked Covington's final appearance with the stable.

In February 2018 and in the midst of his feud with Tyron Woodley, Covington appeared at a WrestlePro event, in conjunction with Impact. His only professional wrestling match to date saw him squash an unidentified wrestler portraying a parody of Woodley, under the ring name TyQuill Woodley.

== Public image ==
=== Political views ===
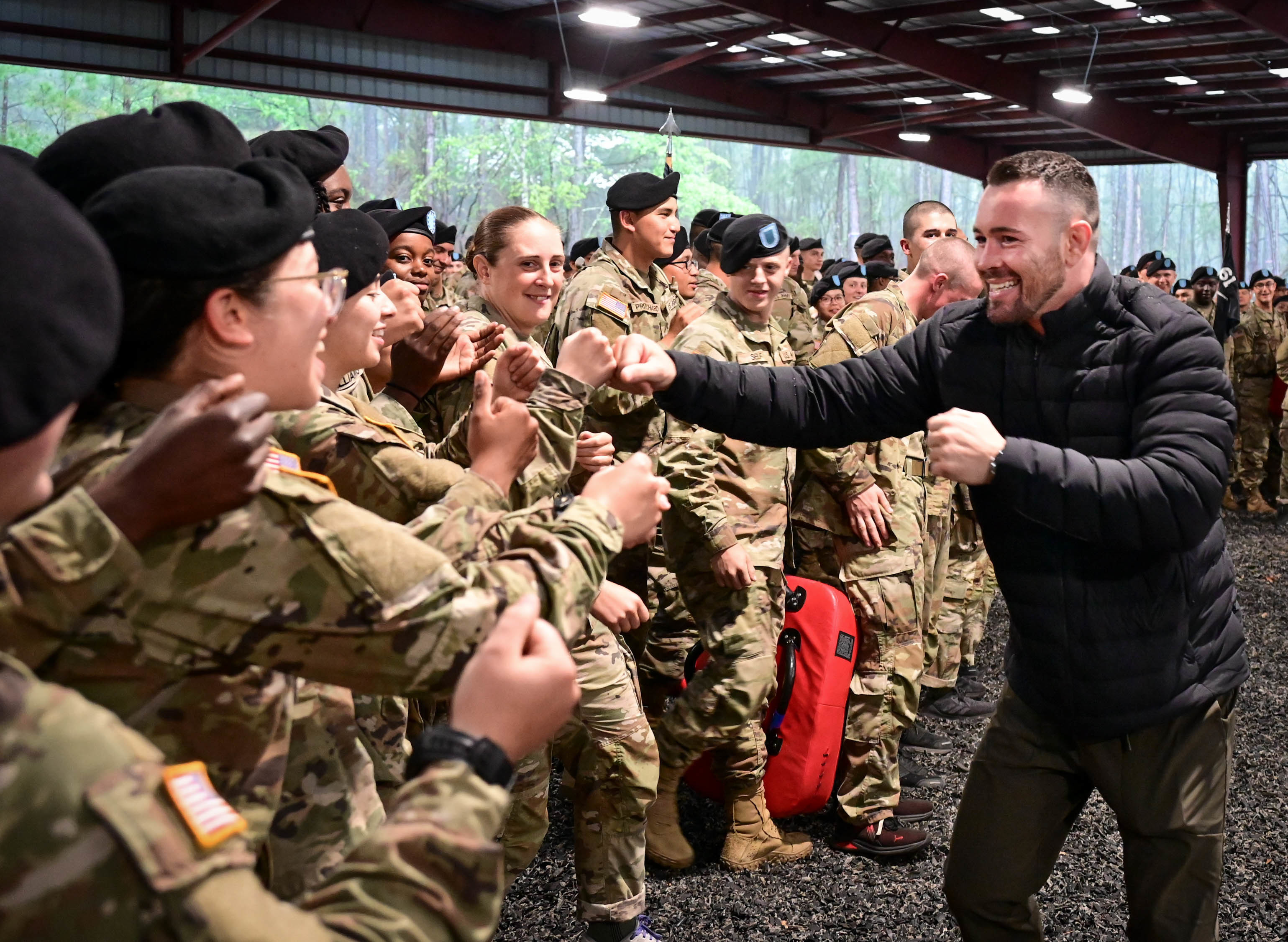
Covington with United States Army soldiers in 2022

Covington is an outspoken supporter of the Republican Party and President Donald Trump. After winning the Interim UFC Welterweight Championship, he stated he wanted to visit Trump at the White House to present him with the title, which he did on August 2, 2018. Trump phoned to congratulate Covington during his post-fight interview following his win over Tyron Woodley. Covington dedicated his win over Woodley to first responders and the military and criticized Black Lives Matter and LeBron James. Woodley had spoken about his support for the Black Lives Matter movement leading up to the fight.

=== Controversies ===
He has described himself as the "super villain" of the UFC and will often try to upset people with brazen trash talking. Following his 2017 bout with Demian Maia at São Paulo, Brazil, he called the country a "dump" and referred to the Brazilian crowd as "filthy animals" in the post-fight interview. In an interview with Candace Owens, Covington said that his "act" was a response to the UFC threatening to cut him before the Maia fight and stated the "filthy animals" speech "saved his career." Covington further embraced his villain status before his 2019 main event encounter with Robbie Lawler at UFC on ESPN 5. He used the WWE entrance theme of professional wrestler Kurt Angle—which is regularly punctuated with crowd chants of "You suck!"—as his entrance music; Angle had given Covington permission to use the theme. With two of Trump's sons, Donald Jr. and Eric cage-side for the fight, the crowd performed the "You suck!" chants during Covington's entrance.

After his win over Lawler, Covington stated; "Let's talk about the lesson we learned tonight that Robbie should have learned from his good buddy Matt Hughes. You stay off the tracks when the train is coming through, junior, doesn't matter if it's the Trump train or the Colby train, get out the way!" during his post-fight interview. This was in reference to a near-fatal accident Hughes suffered in 2017, where he was permanently damaged when his truck was struck by a train at a rail crossing. Despite being criticized by the media, Covington refused to apologize, explaining that "the guy's done some pretty crappy stuff, he's got lawsuits against his family, against his brother, I just said the truth, I'm honest. I'm a little bit brutally honest sometimes and people can't handle it."

Covington continued his trash-talking in the lead up to the Kamaru Usman fight at UFC 245. During a press conference, he said that Usman gave Glenn Robinson, Usman's long-time coach who died in 2018, "a heart attack from all those years you were ducking me," and that Robinson would be "watching from hell on Dec. 14."

In March 2021, Covington created controversy by insinuating that he had a sexual relationship with fellow UFC fighter Polyana Viana and that this was part of the reason why he turned down a fight with Leon Edwards at UFC Fight Night: Edwards vs. Muhammad. Viana herself had earlier claimed that she and Colby were "just friends" and that she already had a boyfriend when addressing rumors that the two of them were in a relationship. After Covington's comments, Viana gave the following statement through her social media: "I have never given room for any kind of comment or judgment about my personal life, but it is not for me to judge the person's attitude. I feel sorry for those who act so low to try to promote themselves. It is revolting."

In the pre-fight press conference for UFC 296, Covington stated in a heated back-and-forth with Leon Edwards: "I'm gonna take you to the seventh layer of hell ... We'll say 'what's up' to your dad while we're there." Edwards' father was murdered when he was 13. He responded by throwing a bottle at Covington. Covington drew further backlash when he stated that he did not feel apologetic about his remarks towards Edwards' late father. Dana White said during the post-fight press conference: "It bothered everybody I think ... We're in the fight game, mean things are said, one of the things that I really don't like is family ... It's just such a nasty thing to do." Covington's performance at UFC 296 also garnered additional criticism, with Dana White commenting that he looked "old and slow."

Covington came under fire in September 2024 for putting rapper Lil Pump in a rear-naked chokehold for a live-streamed video, but not letting go for over 10 seconds after the rapper tapped out. Lil Pump eventually passed out and went limp, only after which did Covington let go. However, the rapper defended Covington, clarifying that he specifically instructed Covington to not let go if he tapped.

==== Attack by Jorge Masvidal ====
On March 22, 2022, it was reported that Covington was assaulted outside of a Miami Beach Papi Steak restaurant by UFC rival Jorge Masvidal, whom Covington had defeated in a lopsided decision previously at UFC 272 a few weeks prior. Covington allegedly suffered a broken tooth from two punches to the face. Masvidal was arrested and charged with aggravated battery, and criminal mischief. On November 6, 2023, Masvidal pleaded no contest to misdemeanor battery in a plea deal that saw felony charges for aggravated battery and criminal mischief against him dropped.

== Championships and accomplishments ==
=== Folkstyle wrestling ===
- National Collegiate Athletic Association
  - NCAA Division I All-American out of Oregon State University (2011)
  - Pac-10 174 lb Conference Championship out of Oregon State University (2010, 2011)
- National Junior College Athletic Association
  - NJCAA 165 lb National Championship out of Iowa Central Community College (2007)
  - NJCAA All-American out of Iowa Central Community College (2007)
- Oregon State Activities Association
  - OSAA 171 lb State Championship out of Thurston High School (2006)
- National High School Coaches Association
  - 2006 NHSCA Senior Nationals- 3rd Place

=== Freestyle wrestling ===
- Real American Freestyle
  - RAF Cruiserweight Crossover Champion (One time, Inaugural, current)
    - One successful title defense
  - Match of the Night (One time) vs. Arman Tsarukyan
- 2006 Freestyle Junior Nationals - 4th place

=== Greco-Roman wrestling ===
- 2005 Greco-Roman Junior Nationals - 5th Place

=== Grappling ===
- FILA
  - 2013 FILA No-Gi Grappling World Championship – 1st place, 77 kg

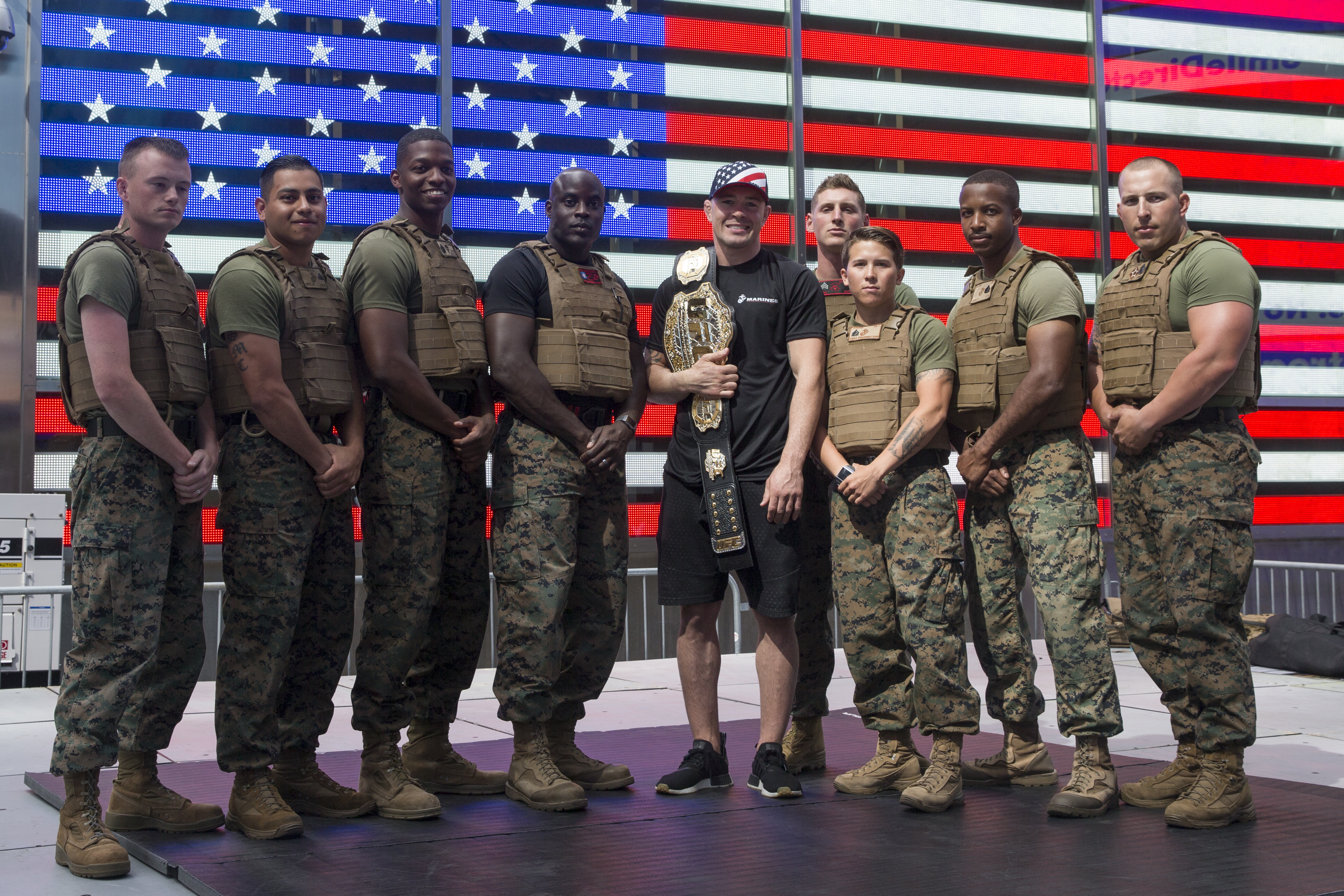
Covington with his Interim UFC Welterweight belt in 2019

=== Mixed martial arts ===
- Ultimate Fighting Championship
  - Interim UFC Welterweight Championship (One time)
  - Fight of the Night (Two times) vs. Kamaru Usman 1 and Jorge Masvidal'
  - Most significant strikes landed in a UFC Welterweight bout (179) (vs. Robbie Lawler)
    - Most significant strikes attempted in a UFC Welterweight bout (515) (vs. Robbie Lawler)
    - Most total strikes attempted in a UFC Welterweight bout (541) (vs. Robbie Lawler)
  - Second most takedowns landed in UFC Welterweight division history (70)
  - Third most control time in UFC Welterweight division history (2:05:05)
  - Fifth most total strikes landed in UFC Welterweight division history (2043)
  - UFC.com Awards
    - 2014: Ranked #5 Newcomer of the Year
    - 2019: Ranked #2 Fight of the Year vs. Kamaru Usman 1
- MMA Weekly
  - 2017 Breakout Fighter of the Year
- CBS Sports
  - 2019 #5 Ranked UFC Fight of the Year vs. Kamaru Usman at UFC 245
- ESPN
  - 2019 Rivalry of the Year vs. Kamaru Usman

== Mixed martial arts record ==
Professional record breakdown
22 matches	17 wins	5 losses
By knockout	4	2
By submission	4	1
By decision	9	2

Res.	Record	Opponent	Method	Event	Date	Round	Time	Location	Notes
Loss	17–5	Joaquin Buckley	TKO (doctor stoppage)	UFC on ESPN: Covington vs. Buckley	December 14, 2024	3	4:42	Tampa, Florida, United States	
Loss	17–4	Leon Edwards	Decision (unanimous)	UFC 296	December 16, 2023	5	5:00	Las Vegas, Nevada, United States	For the UFC Welterweight Championship.
Win	17–3	Jorge Masvidal	Decision (unanimous)	UFC 272	March 5, 2022	5	5:00	Las Vegas, Nevada, United States	Fight of the Night.
Loss	16–3	Kamaru Usman	Decision (unanimous)	UFC 268	November 6, 2021	5	5:00	New York City, New York, United States	For the UFC Welterweight Championship.
Win	16–2	Tyron Woodley	TKO (rib injury)	UFC Fight Night: Covington vs. Woodley	September 19, 2020	5	1:19	Las Vegas, Nevada, United States	
Loss	15–2	Kamaru Usman	TKO (punches)	UFC 245	December 14, 2019	5	4:10	Las Vegas, Nevada, United States	For the UFC Welterweight Championship. Fight of the Night.
Win	15–1	Robbie Lawler	Decision (unanimous)	UFC on ESPN: Covington vs. Lawler	August 3, 2019	5	5:00	Newark, New Jersey, United States	
Win	14–1	Rafael dos Anjos	Decision (unanimous)	UFC 225	June 9, 2018	5	5:00	Chicago, Illinois, United States	Won the interim UFC Welterweight Championship. Later stripped of the title due to injury.
Win	13–1	Demian Maia	Decision (unanimous)	UFC Fight Night: Brunson vs. Machida	October 28, 2017	3	5:00	São Paulo, Brazil	
Win	12–1	Kim Dong-hyun	Decision (unanimous)	UFC Fight Night: Holm vs. Correia	June 17, 2017	3	5:00	Kallang, Singapore	
Win	11–1	Bryan Barberena	Decision (unanimous)	UFC on Fox: VanZant vs. Waterson	December 17, 2016	3	5:00	Sacramento, California, United States	
Win	10–1	Max Griffin	TKO (punches)	UFC 202	August 20, 2016	3	2:18	Las Vegas, Nevada, United States	
Win	9–1	Jonathan Meunier	Submission (rear-naked choke)	UFC Fight Night: MacDonald vs. Thompson	June 18, 2016	3	0:54	Ottawa, Ontario, Canada	
Loss	8–1	Warlley Alves	Submission (guillotine choke)	UFC 194	December 12, 2015	1	1:26	Las Vegas, Nevada, United States	
Win	8–0	Mike Pyle	Decision (unanimous)	UFC 187	May 23, 2015	3	5:00	Las Vegas, Nevada, United States	
Win	7–0	Wagner Silva	Submission (rear-naked choke)	UFC Fight Night: Shogun vs. Saint Preux	November 8, 2014	3	3:26	Uberlândia, Brazil	
Win	6–0	Wang Anying	TKO (submission to punches)	UFC Fight Night: Bisping vs. Le	August 23, 2014	1	4:50	Macau, SAR, China	
Win	5–0	Jay Ellis	Submission (arm-triangle choke)	Absolute FC 21	May 16, 2014	1	2:49	Hollywood, Florida, United States	
Win	4–0	Jose Caceres	Decision (unanimous)	CFA 12	October 12, 2013	3	5:00	Coral Gables, Florida, United States	
Win	3–0	Jason Jackson	Decision (unanimous)	Fight Time 10	June 22, 2012	3	5:00	Fort Lauderdale, Florida, United States	
Win	2–0	David Hayes	Submission (arm-triangle choke)	Fight Time 9	April 27, 2012	2	1:42	Fort Lauderdale, Florida, United States	
Win	1–0	Chris Ensley	TKO (submission to knee injury)	Midtown Throwdown 3	February 11, 2012	1	1:21	Eugene, Oregon, United States	Welterweight debut.

== Pay-per-view bouts ==
No.	Event	Fight	Date	Venue	City	PPV Buys
1.	UFC 245	Usman vs. Covington	December 14, 2019	T-Mobile Arena	Las Vegas, Nevada, United States	Not Disclosed
2.	UFC 268	Usman vs. Covington 2	November 6, 2021	Madison Square Garden	New York City, New York, United States	700,000
3.	UFC 272	Covington vs. Masvidal	March 5, 2022	T-Mobile Arena	Las Vegas, Nevada, United States	Not Disclosed
4.	UFC 296	Edwards vs. Covington	December 16, 2023	T-Mobile Arena	Las Vegas, Nevada, United States	Not Disclosed

== NCAA record ==
NCAA Championships Matches
Res.	Record	Opponent	Score	Date	Event
2011 NCAA Championships 5th at 174 lbs
Win	7–4	Christopher Henrich	3–2	March 17–19, 2011	2011 NCAA Division I National Championships
Loss	6–4	Mack Lewnes	5–12	March 17–19, 2011	2011 NCAA Division I National Championships
Win	6–3	Mike Letts	6–1	March 17–19, 2011	2011 NCAA Division I National Championships
Win	5–3	Ryan Patrovich	3–2	March 17–19, 2011	2011 NCAA Division I National Championships
Loss	4–3	Chris Henrich	5–7	March 17–19, 2011	2011 NCAA Division I National Championships
Win	4–2	Jacob Swartz	8–2	March 17–19, 2011	2011 NCAA Division I National Championships
Win	3–2	Mike Dessino	MD 18–6	March 17–19, 2011	2011 NCAA Division I National Championships
2010 NCAA Championships DNP at 174 lbs
Loss	2–2	Ben Bennet	Fall	March 18–20, 2010	2010 NCAA Division I National Championships
Loss	2–1	Mack Lewnes	OT 2–4	March 18–20, 2010	2010 NCAA Division I National Championships
Win	2–0	Luke Manuel	OT 3–1	March 18–20, 2010	2010 NCAA Division I National Championships
Win	1–0	Jim Rednick	MD 10–1	March 18–20, 2010	2010 NCAA Division I National Championships

== Freestyle wrestling record ==
Freestyle matches
Res.	Record	Opponent	Score	Date	Event	Location	Notes
Win	5–0	(United States) Belal Muhammad	TF 10–0	September 19, 2026	RAF 13: Covington vs. Muhammad	(United States) Miami, Florida	Defended the RAF Cruiserweight Crossover Championship
Win	4–0	(Armenia) Arman Tsarukyan	5–2	July 18, 2026	RAF 11: Tsarukyan vs. Covington	(United States) Milwaukee, Wisconsin	Won the inaugural RAF Cruiserweight Crossover Championship
Win	3–0	(United States) Chris Weidman	5–4	May 30, 2026	RAF 09: Steveson vs. Romanov	(United States) Arlington, Texas	200 lb catchweight limit
Win	2–0	(United States) Dillon Danis	TF 14–4	March 28, 2026	RAF 07: Tsarukyan vs. Poullas 2	(United States) Tampa, Florida	200 lb catchweight limit
Win	1–0	(United States) Luke Rockhold	TF 12–0	January 10, 2026	RAF 05: Covington vs. Rockhold	(United States) Sunrise, Florida	190 lb cruiserweight limit

== See also ==
- List of male mixed martial artists

Achievements
Preceded by Carlos Condit	3rd UFC Interim Welterweight Champion; June 9, 2018 – September 8, 2018; Stripped	Vacant
