= UFC 245 =

UFC mixed martial arts event in 2019

UFC 245: Usman vs. Covington
- The poster for UFC 245: Usman vs. Covington
- Promotion: Ultimate Fighting Championship
- Date: December 14, 2019
- Venue: T-Mobile Arena
- City: Paradise, Nevada, United States
- Attendance: 16,811
- Total gate: $4,041,119.14

Event chronology
UFC on ESPN: Overeem vs. Rozenstruik	UFC 245: Usman vs. Covington	UFC Fight Night: Edgar vs. The Korean Zombie

UFC 245: Usman vs. Covington was a mixed martial arts event produced by the Ultimate Fighting Championship that took place on December 14, 2019, at T-Mobile Arena in Paradise, Nevada, part of the Las Vegas Metropolitan Area, United States.

== Background ==
A UFC Welterweight Championship bout between the current champion and The Ultimate Fighter: American Top Team vs. Blackzilians winner Kamaru Usman and former interim champion Colby Covington served as the event headliner.

A UFC Featherweight Championship bout between the current champion Max Holloway and Alexander Volkanovski took place as the co-main event.

A UFC Women's Bantamweight Championship bout between the current champion Amanda Nunes (also the current UFC Women's Featherweight Champion) and the inaugural featherweight champion Germaine de Randamie also took place at the event. The pairing previously met in November 2013 at UFC: Fight for the Troops 3, with Nunes winning the encounter via TKO in the first round.

Santiago Ponzinibbio was expected to face former welterweight champion Robbie Lawler at the event. However, Ponzinibbio pulled out of the fight on October 12 citing a staph infection. Despite having over two months before the event, promotion officials elected to remove Lawler from the card entirely instead of having him face a replacement.

Sergio Pettis was briefly linked to a bout with Kai Kara-France at the event. However, Pettis revealed in early October that he was entertaining offers from other promotions after the completion of his previous contract and did not currently have a fight lined up with the promotion. Kara-France ultimately faced Brandon Moreno.

At the weigh-ins, former UFC Women's Flyweight Championship challenger Jessica Eye failed to make weight, coming in at 131 pounds, five pounds over the flyweight non-title fight limit of 126 pounds. She was fined 30% of her fight purse, which went to her opponent Viviane Araújo and the bout proceeded at a catchweight.

== Results ==
Main Card
Weight class				Method	Round	Time	Notes
Welterweight	Kamaru Usman (c)	def.	Colby Covington	TKO (punches)	5	4:10	(Note: For the UFC Welterweight Championship.)
Featherweight	Alexander Volkanovski	def.	Max Holloway (c)	Decision (unanimous) (48–47, 48–47, 50–45)	5	5:00	(Note: For the UFC Featherweight Championship.)
Women's Bantamweight	Amanda Nunes (c)	def.	Germaine de Randamie	Decision (unanimous) (49–44, 49–46, 49–45)	5	5:00	(Note: For the UFC Women's Bantamweight Championship.)
Bantamweight	Marlon Moraes	def.	José Aldo	Decision (split) (29–28, 28–29, 29–28)	3	5:00
Bantamweight	Petr Yan	def.	Urijah Faber	KO (head kick)	3	0:43
Preliminary Card (ESPN2)
Welterweight	Geoff Neal	def.	Mike Perry	TKO (head kick and punches)	1	1:30
Women's Bantamweight	Irene Aldana	def.	Ketlen Vieira	KO (punches)	1	4:51
Middleweight	Omari Akhmedov	def.	Ian Heinisch	Decision (unanimous) (29–28, 29–28, 29–28)	3	5:00
Welterweight	Matt Brown	def.	Ben Saunders	KO (elbows and punches)	2	4:55
Early Preliminary card (UFC Fight Pass)
Featherweight	Chase Hooper	def.	Daniel Teymur	TKO (elbows and punches)	1	4:34
Flyweight	Brandon Moreno	def.	Kai Kara-France	Decision (unanimous) (29–28, 30–27, 29–28)	3	5:00
Catchweight (131 lb)	Jessica Eye	def.	Viviane Araújo	Decision (unanimous) (29–28, 29–28, 29–28)	3	5:00
Middleweight	Punahele Soriano	def.	Oskar Piechota	KO (punch)	1	3:17

== Bonus awards ==
The following fighters received $50,000 bonuses.

- Fight of the Night: Kamaru Usman vs. Colby Covington
- Performance of the Night: Petr Yan and Irene Aldana

== Reported payout ==
The following is the reported payout to the fighters as reported to the Nevada State Athletic Commission. It does not include sponsor money and also does not include the UFC's traditional "fight night" bonuses. The total disclosed payout for the event was $4,084,000.

- Kamaru Usman: $500,000 (no win bonus) def. Colby Covington: $500,000
- Alexander Volkanovski: $250,000 (no win bonus) def. Max Holloway: $350,000
- Amanda Nunes: $450,000 (includes $100,000 win bonus) def. Germaine de Randamie: $100,000
- Marlon Moraes: $220,000 (includes $110,000 win bonus) def. José Aldo: $400,000
- Petr Yan: $132,000 (includes $66,000 win bonus) def. Urijah Faber: $250,000
- Geoff Neal: $62,000 (includes $31,000 win bonus) def. Mike Perry: $90,000
- Irene Aldana: $80,000 (includes $40,000 win bonus) def. Ketlen Vieira: $33,000
- Omari Akhmedov: $110,000 (includes $55,000 win bonus) def. Ian Heinisch: $25,000
- Matt Brown: $160,000 (includes $80,000 win bonus) def. Ben Saunders: $35,000
- Chase Hooper: $48,000 (includes $24,000 win bonus) def. Daniel Teymur: $18,000
- Brandon Moreno: $62,000 (includes $31,000 win bonus) def. Kai Kara-France: $25,000
- Jessica Eye: $96,000 (includes $48,000 win bonus) def. Viviane Araújo: $45,000
- Puna Soriano: $20,000 (includes $10,000 win bonus) def. Oskar Piechota: $20,000

== See also ==
- List of UFC events
- 2019 in UFC
- List of current UFC fighters
