= Brother Oliver =

American indie rock band

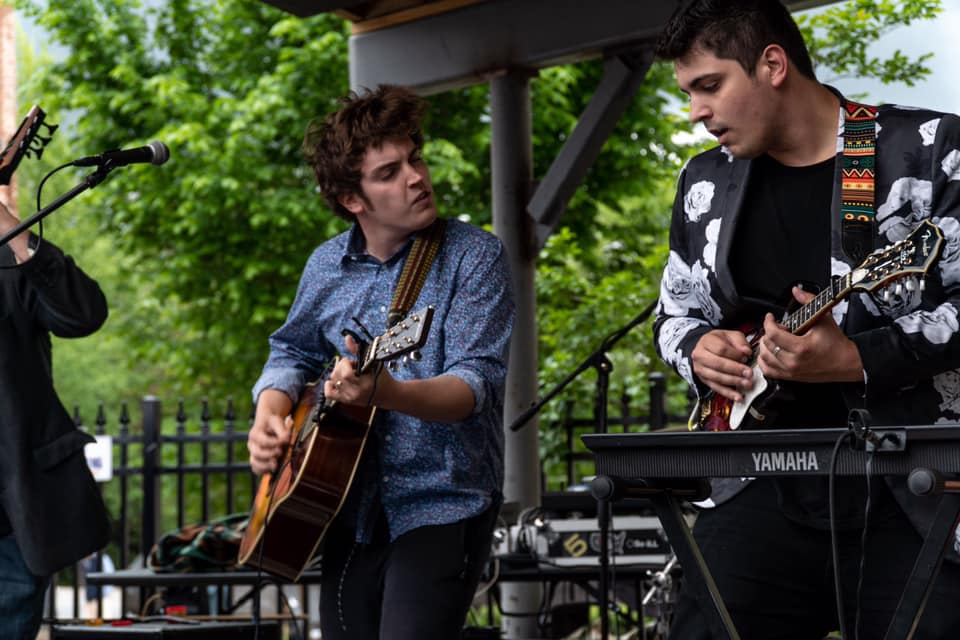

Background information
- Origin: Greenville, Michigan, USA
- Genres: Indie rock, psychedelic folk, Americana, alt country
- Years active: 2013-present
- Labels: Forthright Records
- Members: Andrew P. Oliver; Stephen Oliver; George Sweet; Ryan McCarthy
- Past members: Devin Taylor
- Website: brotheroliver.com

Brother Oliver is an American indie rock band based in Greenville, South Carolina.

== Background ==
Brother Oliver was formed in 2013 by brothers Andrew P. Oliver and Stephen Oliver in Greenville, Michigan before moving the band to Greenville, South Carolina where they currently reside.

They have released three studio albums, two EPs, and twenty singles under their label Forthright Records.

Their debut self-titled album Brother Oliver was featured by the HuffPost. The band's single "Castles" was premiered by Pop Matters in 2019. Their 2020 single "Minimum Wage" was premiered by American Songwriter.

The group has toured on bills with The Steve Miller Band, Of Montreal, Drake Bell, and Susto.

The lead singer for the band, Andrew P. Oliver, has produced music featured by the UFC.

The band's mandolin player, Stephen Oliver, is the Guinness World Record holder for the ‘longest mandolin playing marathon’ which was the subject of the feature documentary How to Break a World Record that released in 2024 on Apple TV and Prime Video.

The band's bassist, George Sweet, is a classical composer published under Excelcia Music Publishing.

== Film ==
In 2024, Brother Oliver starred the documentary How to Break a World Record which followed Stephen Oliver's attempt to break the world record for the ‘longest marathon playing mandolin’.

Lead singer Andrew P. Oliver stars in the 2025 documentary Paperweight.

== Discography ==
=== Studio albums ===
- Stubborn Fool (2014) (Forthright Records)
- Brother Oliver (2017) (Forthright Records)
- Well, Hell (2019) (Forthright Records)

=== EPs ===
- Command Shift EP (2020) (Forthright Records)
- Sped Up, Vol. 1 (2023) (Forthright Records)

=== Singles ===
- I Rely on Everything (2017) (Forthright Records)
- What Will Be Will Be (2017) (Forthright Records)
- O Come, O Come, Emmanuel (2017) (Forthright Records)
- Castles (2018) (Forthright Records)
- False Prophet (2018) Forthright Records)
- Coffee and a Cigarette (2019) (Forthright Records)
- Someday (2019) (Forthright Records)
- Blinded (2019) (Forthright Records)
- Improving Morale (2019) (Forthright Records)
- Altars (2019) (Forthright Records)
- Mad World (2019) (Forthright Records)
- While I'm Driving (2020) (Forthright Records)
- Between Two Lines (2020) (Forthright Records)
- Stars / I Dreamed a Dream (2021) (Forthright Records)
- Minimum Wage (Parlor Version) (2022) (Forthright Records)
- Blind Belief (2022) (Forthright Records)
- The Greatest Adventure (2023) (Forthright Records)
- Washed Up (2023) (Forthright Records)
- The Foggy Dew (Walkout Remix) (2024) (Forthright Records)
- Pitchforks (2024) (Forthright Records)
- Outside Looking In (2024) (Forthright Records)
- The Orchestra (2024) (Forthright Records)
- Dead Poets Society (2025) (Forthright Records)
