= Di Leo =

Di Leo is a surname of Italian origin. Notable people with the surname include:

- Fernando Di Leo (1932–2003), Italian film director and script writer
- Gregorio Di Leo (born 1983), Italian professional kickboxer
- Jeffrey R. Di Leo, American scholar

== See also ==
- Leo Di, shortform for Leonardo DiCaprio (born 1974), American actor and film producer
