= W.A.K.O. World Championships 2005 =

W.A.K.O. World Championships 2005 may refer to:

- W.A.K.O. World Championships 2005 (Agadir)
- W.A.K.O. World Championships 2005 (Szeged)
