= Men's Full-Contact at WAKO World Championships 2007 Coimbra +91 kg =

The men's super heavyweight (+91 kg/200.2 lbs) Full-Contact category at the W.A.K.O. World Championships 2007 in Coimbra was the heaviest of the male Full-Contact tournaments involving twelve fighters from three continents (Europe, Africa and North America). Each of the matches was three rounds of two minutes each and were fought under Full-Contact rules.

As there were too few men for a sixteen-man tournament, four of the contestants received byes through to the quarter-final stage. The tournament champion was Alexey Tokarev from Russia who won gold by defeating 2008 Olympic Games boxer Marko Tomasović from Croatia by unanimous decision in the final. Defeated semi finalists Jukka Saarinen from Finland and Tihamér Brunner from Hungary received bronze medals.

== Results ==
1st round
(Norway) Andreas Hoftun	D(3:0)
(Turkey) Hamza Kendircioglu
(Croatia) Marko Tomasović	D(2:1)
(South Africa) Eddie Theron
(Germany) Michael Diener
(Russia) Alexey Tokarev	D(3:0)
(Hungary) Tihamér Brunner	D(2:1)
(Italy) Giacomo Paterni

Quarter-finals
(Finland) Jukka Saarinen	D(3:0)
(Norway) Andreas Hoftun
(Azerbaijan) Hafiz Bakhshaliyev
(Croatia) Marko Tomasović	D(2:1)
(United States) Scott Lanigan
(Russia) Alexey Tokarev	D(3:0)
(Hungary) Tihamér Brunner	D(3:0)
(Poland) Michal Wszelak

Semi-finals
(Finland) Jukka Saarinen
(Croatia) Marko Tomasović	D(2:1)
(Russia) Alexey Tokarev	D(3:0)
(Hungary) Tihamér Brunner

Final
(Croatia) Marko Tomasović
(Russia) Alexey Tokarev	D(3:0)

=== Key ===
Abbreviation	Meaning
D (3:0)	Decision (Unanimous)
D (2:1)	Decision (Split)
KO	Knockout
TKO	Technical Knockout
AB	Abandonment (Injury in match)
WO	Walkover (No fight)
DQ	Disqualification

== See also ==
- List of WAKO Amateur World Championships
- List of WAKO Amateur European Championships
- List of male kickboxers
