= Men's Semi-Contact at WAKO World Championships 2007 Coimbra -69 kg =

The men's 69 kg (151.8 lbs) Semi-Contact category at the W.A.K.O. World Championships 2007 in Coimbra was the third lightest of the male Semi-Contact tournaments falling in between the welterweight and light middleweight divisions when compared to Full-Contact's weight classes. There were nineteen men from four continents (Europe, Asia, Africa and North America) taking part in the competition. Each of the matches was three rounds of two minutes each and were fought under Semi-Contact rules.

Due to the fact there were too few contestants for a tournament of thirty-two, thirteen of the men received a bye through to the second round. The tournament winner was Italian Gregorio Di Leo who won his third W.A.K.O. Semi-Contact gold medal by defeating Tamás Imre of Hungary in the final by points decision. Defeated semi finalists Pole Przemysław Ziemnicki and Greek Kostas Taboureas were rewarded for their efforts with bronze medals.

== Results ==
1st Round
(Hungary) Tamás Imre	17
(Austria) Michael Gebhart	3
(Germany) Christian Welker	19
(Bulgaria) Petar Zivkov	9
(United States) James Bonner	20
(Denmark) Michael Møller	30

2nd Round
(Switzerland) Christian Boujibar	7
(Poland) Przemysław Ziemnicki	11
(Republic of Ireland) Jay Daniels	20
(Canada) Dwaine Blair	21
(Slovenia) Aleksander Kolednik	14
(Peru) Bernardo Elias	4
(South Africa) JD Du Plessis	3
(Hungary) Tamás Imre	17
(United Kingdom) Sean McCarthy	10
(Greece) Kostas Taboureas	15
(Czech Republic) Marek Svitek	16
(Germany) Christian Welker	15
(Turkey) Mustafa Demirel	9
(Denmark) Michael Møller	19
(Russia) Stepan Botyuk	1
(Italy) Gregorio Di Leo	12

Quarter Finals
(Poland) Przemysław Ziemnicki	18
(Canada) Dwaine Blair	13
(Slovenia) Aleksander Kolednik	8
(Hungary) Tamás Imre	10
(Greece) Kostas Taboureas	7
(Czech Republic) Marek Svitek	1
(Denmark) Michael Møller	8
(Italy) Gregorio Di Leo	18

Semi Finals
(Poland) Przemysław Ziemnicki	12
(Hungary) Tamás Imre	15
(Greece) Kostas Taboureas	16
(Italy) Gregorio Di Leo	19

Final
(Hungary) Tamás Imre	?
(Italy) Gregorio Di Leo	?

=== Key ===
Abbreviation	Meaning
D (3:0)	Decision (Unanimous)
D (2:1)	Decision (Split)
KO	Knockout
TKO	Technical Knockout
AB	Abandonment (Injury in match)
WO	Walkover (No fight)
DQ	Disqualification

== See also ==
- List of WAKO Amateur World Championships
- List of WAKO Amateur European Championships
- List of male kickboxers
