= Women's Light-Contact at WAKO World Championships 2007 Belgrade -65 kg =

Kickboxing tournament

Women's Light-Contact Kickboxing at the W.A.K.O. World Championships 2007 (Belgrade)
-55 kg
-60 kg
-65 kg
-70 kg
+70 kg

The women's 65 kg (143 lbs) Light-Contact category at the W.A.K.O. World Championships 2007 in Belgrade was the third heaviest of the female Light-Contact tournaments being the equivalent of the light heavyweight division when compared to the Low-Kick and K-1 weight classes. There were fifteen women from two continents (Europe and Oceania) taking part in the competition. Each of the matches was three rounds of two minutes each and were fought under Light-Contact rules.

One woman received a bye to the quarterfinal round because the tournament only had room for sixteen participants. The tournament was won by Slovenia's Sabina Sehic who defeated Austrian 2004 I.A.K.S.A. Light-Contact world champion Nicole Trimmel in the final by split decision. Julia Göldner from Germany and Irena Kobosilova from the Czech Republic gained bronze medals.

== Results ==
1st Round
(Hungary) Marta Fenyvesi	D(3:0)
(France) Isabelle Pare
(Switzerland) Nicole Blaser
(Germany) Julia Göldner	D(3:0)
(Slovenia) Sabina Sehic	D(3:0)
(Slovakia) Dagmar Kundrikova
(Australia) Anna Rusnak
(Sweden) Jenny Andersson	D(3:0)
(Italy) Chiara Leonardi
(Croatia) Katarina Ilicic	D(3:0)
(Austria) Nicole Trimmel	D(3:0)
(United Kingdom) Louise Dixon
(Russia) Alina Abbyasova
(Czech Republic) Irena Kobosilova	D(2:1)

Quarter Finals
(Hungary) Marta Fenyvesi
(Germany) Julia Göldner	D(3:0)
(Slovenia) Sabina Sehic	D(3:0)
(Sweden) Jenny Andersson
(Croatia) Katarina Ilicic
(Austria) Nicole Trimmel	D(2:1)
(Czech Republic) Irena Kobosilova	D(2:1)
(Poland) Katarzyna Furmaniak

Semi Finals
(Germany) Julia Göldner
(Slovenia) Sabina Sehic	D(3:0)
(Austria) Nicole Trimmel	D(3:0)
(Czech Republic) Irena Kobosilova

Final
(Slovenia) Sabina Sehic	D(2:1)
(Austria) Nicole Trimmel

=== Key ===
Abbreviation	Meaning
D (3:0)	Decision (Unanimous)
D (2:1)	Decision (Split)

== See also ==
- List of WAKO Amateur World Championships
- List of WAKO Amateur European Championships
- List of female kickboxers
