= Women's Light-Contact at WAKO World Championships 2007 Belgrade -55 kg =

Kickboxing tournament

Women's Light-Contact Kickboxing at the W.A.K.O. World Championships 2007 (Belgrade)
-55 kg
-60 kg
-65 kg
-70 kg
+70 kg

The women's 55 kg (121 lbs) Light-Contact category at the W.A.K.O. World Championships 2007 in Belgrade was the lightest of the female Light-Contact tournaments falling between featherweight and lightweight when compared to Low-Kick and K-1 weight classes. There were fourteen women taking part in the competition, all based in Europe. Each of the matches was three rounds of two minutes each and were fought under Light-Contact rules.

Due to the number of fighters unsuitable for a tournament designed for sixteen, two of the contestants had byes through to the quarter-final stage. The winner of the tournament was Russia's Maria Kushtanova who won by abandonment as her Hungarian opponent Monika Molnar had to give up due to an injury in their final match. For reaching the semi-finals Swiss Petra Battig and Ukrainian Kateryna Solovey claimed bronze medals.

== Results ==
1st round
(Switzerland) Petra Battig	D(3:0)
(Slovakia) Zuzana Gregusova
(Poland) Dorota Godzina	D(3:0)
(Czech Republic) Ivana Veselkova
(France) Laszak Roxane
(Hungary) Monika Molnar	D(3:0)
(Denmark) Johanna Striim	D(3:0)
(Turkey) Figen Dikbayir
(Italy) Claudia Mattiuzzi
(Ukraine) Kateryna Solovey	D(3:0)
(Croatia) Matea Malec
(Sweden) Sara Svensson	D(3:0)

Quarter-finals
(Germany) Jessica Heymann
(Switzerland) Petra Battig	D(3:0)
(Poland) Dorota Godzina
(Hungary) Monika Molnar	D(3:0)
(Denmark) Johanna Striim
(Ukraine) Kateryna Solovey	D(3:0)
(Sweden) Sara Svensson
(Russia) Maria Kushtanova	D(3:0)

Semi-finals
(Switzerland) Petra Battig
(Hungary) Monika Molnar	D(2:1)
(Ukraine) Kateryna Solovey
(Russia) Maria Kushtanova	D(3:0)

Final
(Hungary) Monika Molnar
(Russia) Maria Kushtanova	AB

=== Key ===
Abbreviation	Meaning
D (3:0)	Decision (Unanimous)
D (2:1)	Decision (Split)
AB	Abandonment (Injury in match)

== See also ==
- List of WAKO Amateur World Championships
- List of WAKO Amateur European Championships
- List of kickboxers
