= Andrew P. Oliver =

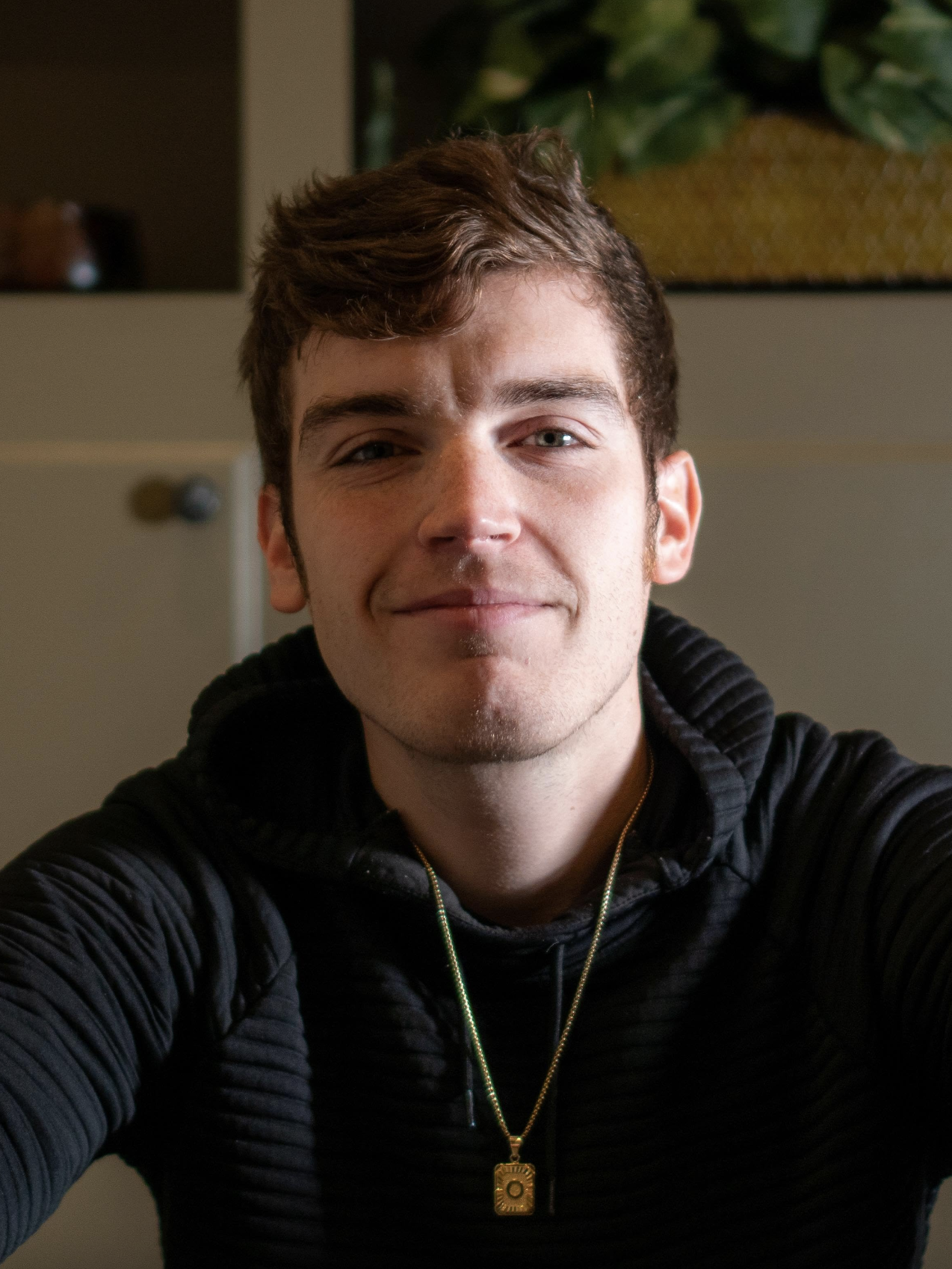
- Oliver in 2024
- Occupation(s): Music producer, filmmaker, and entrepreneur
- Years active: 2013–present
- Website: forthrightrecords.com

Andrew Philip Oliver is an American music producer, filmmaker, and entrepreneur. He was in the band Brother Oliver, the movie How To Break A World Record, and is CEO of Forthright Records. Oliver is a serial entrepreneur, founding several businesses and products including WAVS Custom and Dummiez.

== Early life ==
Oliver was raised in Greenville, Michigan. He attended Bob Jones University in Greenville, South Carolina where he studied business administration.

== Music ==
Oliver's career in music began with the formation of the band Brother Oliver, which he started with his brother Stephen Oliver in 2013. The band toured full time between 2015-2019, releasing multiple studio albums and sharing the stage with bands the Steve Miller Band and Drake Bell.

As a solo artist, Oliver released various records under his artist name Andrew P. Oliver—including The Hobbit cartoon-inspired album Glamdring and the walkout song for the UFC featherweight Westin Wilson at UFC Vegas 84 and UFC Vegas 93.

== Business ==
In 2019, Oliver created the music accessory product Dummiez and co-founded the earphone tech company WAVS Custom which he developed and launched as founder and COO until the winter of 2022 before exiting the business.

In 2022, he became full-time in his role as CEO of his label and production studio, Forthright Records.

== Film ==
Oliver was the co-director and producer of the 2024 feature documentary How to Break a World Record, in which he also starred as himself.

He stars in the reality-journalism documentary, Paperweight, alongside UFC fighters Westin Wilson and Stephen Thompson.

== Filmography ==
2012	Ridiculousness	Self	1 episode
2024	How to Break a World Record	Self	Executive producer, director
2025	Paperweight	Self	Star, director
