= Women's Light-Contact at WAKO World Championships 2007 Belgrade +70 kg =

Kickboxing tournament

Women's Light-Contact Kickboxing at the W.A.K.O. World Championships 2007 (Belgrade)
-55 kg
-60 kg
-65 kg
-70 kg
+70 kg

The women's Over 70 kg (+154 lbs) Light-Contact category at the W.A.K.O. World Championships 2007 in Belgrade was the heaviest of the female Light-Contact tournaments being the equivalent of the super heavyweight division when compared to the Low-Kick and K-1 weight classes. There were five women taking part in the competition, all based in Europe. Each of the matches was three rounds of two minutes each and were fought under Light-Contact rules.

Due to the low number of competitors unsuitable for a tournament designed for eight, two women had byes through to the semi-finals. The tournament was won by Russia's Oxana Kinakh who defeated Hungarian Barbara Kovacs in the final by split decision. Ireland's Diana Cambell and Germany's Natali John won bronze medals.

== Results ==
Quarter-finals		Semi-finals		Final
		(Hungary) Barbara Kovacs	D(2:1)
		(Germany) Natali John
				(Hungary) Barbara Kovacs
(United Kingdom) Stephanie Toal				(Russia) Oxana Kinakh	D(2:1)
(Republic of Ireland) Diana Cambell	D(2:1)	(Republic of Ireland) Diana Cambell
		(Russia) Oxana Kinakh	D(3:0)

=== Key ===
Abbreviation	Meaning
D (3:0)	Decision (Unanimous)
D (2:1)	Decision (Split)

== See also ==
- List of WAKO Amateur World Championships
- List of WAKO Amateur European Championships
- List of female kickboxers
