= American Book Review =

- Language: English
- Edited by: Jeffrey R. Di Leo

Publication details
- History: 1977–present
- Frequency: Quarterly
- Open access: No

Standard abbreviations
- ISO 4: Am. Book Rev.

Indexing
- ISSN: 0149-9408 (print); 2153-4578 (web)

Links
- Journal homepage

American Book Review is a literary journal edited at Texas A&M University-Victoria and published by the University of Nebraska Press. Its mission is to "specialize in reviews of frequently neglected published works of fiction, poetry, and literary and cultural criticism from small, regional, university, ethnic, avant-garde, and women's presses."

Originally published as a bimonthly tabloid journal, ABR announced that beginning with its 43rd volume (Winter 2022) the journal would be redesigned and published as a bound quarterly.

In addition to publishing the journal, American Book Review ran for many years the UHV/ABR Reading Series. It hosted more than a hundred and twenty speakers in Victoria, Texas. The reading series featured "nationally recognized writers on extended visits to the Victoria campus," who read from their most recent works, participated in discussion with UHV faculty and staff, and offered signed editions of their work for purchase.

== History ==
The American Book Review was founded in 1977 by Ronald Sukenick. According to the novelist Raymond Federman, in his series reading with American Book Review in 2007, Sukenick founded the American Book Review because The New York Times had stopped reviewing books by "that group labeled experimental writers", and Sukenick wanted to start a "journal where we can review books that everyone is ignoring." Federman and Sukenick both funded the beginning of American Book Review, with the "American" in the title suggesting that the journal would review books from all across American and not primarily focus on books from New York.

Originally operating out of University of Colorado at Boulder in 1987, ABR later moved to Illinois State University in 1995. In The Employment of English, Michael Bérubé writes, "When Ron Sukenick folded the University of Colorado (Boulder) branch of FC2, Normal also picked up publication of American Book Review, one of the liveliest general-purpose reader's guides for everything." Rochelle Ratner served as the publication's longtime executive editor.

In 2006, the publication then moved to the University of Houston-Victoria. In 2009, an agreement between American Book Review and Johns Hopkins University Press allowed online editions of its past issues to be available through the database ProjectMuse. Currently, the American Book Review is published and distributed by the University of Nebraska Press. The editorial staff of ABR includes Jeffrey R. Di Leo as editor-in-chief and Jake Snyder as managing editor among others.

In 2024, the American Book Review was presented with the Phoenix Award for Significant Editorial Achievement from the Council of Editors of Learned Journals.
