= W.A.K.O. European Championships 2006 (Lisbon) =

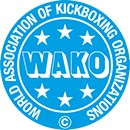
- The poster for W.A.K.O. European Championships 2006 (Lisbon)
- Promotion: W.A.K.O.
- Date: 24 October (Start); 30 October 2006 (End)
- City: Lisbon, Portugal

Event chronology
W.A.K.O. World Championships 2005 (Szeged)	W.A.K.O. European Championships 2006 (Lisbon)	W.A.K.O. European Championships 2006 (Skopje)

W.A.K.O. European Championships 2006 (Lisbon) were the joint eighteenth European kickboxing championships held by the W.A.K.O. organization (the other event would be held the next month in Skopje, Macedonia) and the second to be held in Portugal and the city of Lisbon. The event was open to amateur men and women from across Europe although a number of professional fighters such as Luis Reis would take part. All in all, it was the largest ever European championships with around 560 athletes from 31 countries taking part. One of the reasons for the higher numbers being that W.A.K.O. had merged had recently merged with the I.K.A.S. and took on many of the I.K.A.S. organization's fighters. Another reason was that some countries were allowed multiple competitors per weight division in the Full-Contact and Semi-Contact categories.

There were four styles on offer in Lisbon; Full-Contact, Semi-Contact, Musical Forms and Aero-Kickboxing. By the end of the championships Russia was once again the strongest nation across all styles, with Italy in second and Hungary in third. The event was held over seven days in Lisbon, Portugal, starting on Tuesday, 24 October and finishing on Monday, 30 October.

== Full-Contact ==
Full-Contact is a form of kickboxing where the contestants can throw punches and kicks with full power at legal targets above the waist. Victories are usually gained via a point's decision or by referee stoppage and as with most other forms of amateur kickboxing, various head and body protection must be worn. More information on Full-Contact and the rule set can be accessed at the W.A.K.O. website. Both men and women had competitions at Lisbon, with the men having twelve weight divisions ranging from 51 kg/112.2 lbs to over 91 kg/+200.2 lbs and the women seven, ranging from 48 kg/105.6 lbs to over 70 kg/+143 lbs and unlike more recent W.A.K.O. championships some countries were allowed more than one athlete per weight division.

There were several repeat winners at Lisbon with Zurab Faroyan moving up in weight to win his third gold medal in a row, Konstantin Sbytov won in Full-Contact after winning in Low-Kick at the world championships in Agadir while Valeria Calabrese and Monika Florek had won at the last world championships in Szeged. Local fighter and K-1 MAX regional winner Luis Reis was probably the most recognisable name in the category but had to make do with silver. By the end of the championships, Russia were once again the strongest nation in Full-Contact, winning nine gold, three silver and seven bronze medals.

=== Men's Full-Contact Kickboxing Medals Table ===
Event	Gold	Silver	Bronze
Light Bantamweight -51 kg	Ivan Sciolla (Italy)	Ramazan Ballioglu (Turkey)	Wojciech Peryt (Poland); Pavel Isinbaev (Russia)
Bantamweight -54 kg	Serhiy Cherkaskyy (Ukraine)	Ruslan Abbasov (Russia)	David Oltvanyi (Hungary); Andrey Samozhikov (Russia)
Featherweight -57 kg	Damian Ławniczak (Poland)	Igor Pavlenko (Ukraine)	Alexander Shamray (Russia); Remzi Ulas (Turkey)
Lightweight -60 kg	Zurab Faroyan (Russia)	Daniel Martins (France)	Sandor Kornel (Hungary); Armen Israelyan (Russia)
Light Welterweight -63.5 kg	Evgeny Mayer (Russia)	Ayoub Saidi (Denmark)	Toma Tomov (Bulgaria); Tomasz Pietraszewski (Poland)
Welterweight -67 kg	Vladimir Tarasov (Russia)	Edmond Mebenga (France)	Venelin Iankov (Bulgaria); Zsolt Nagy (Hungary)
Light Middleweight -71 kg	Konstantin Sbytov (Russia)	Luis Reis (Portugal)	Pavel Tarik (Russia); Mariusz Zietek (Poland)
Middleweight -75 kg	Markus Hakulinen (Finland)	Ricardo Fernandes (Portugal)	Manuchari Pipiya (Russia); Krasimir Apostolov (Bulgaria)
Light Heavyweight -81 kg	Murat Betsukov (Russia)	Mehmet Özer (Turkey)	Teppo Laine (Finland); Bernhard Sussitz (Austria)
Cruiserweight -86 kg	Sergey Bogdan (Russia)	Maxim Voronov (Russia)	Sérgio Gonçalves (Portugal); Bartolomiej Bocian (Portugal)
Heavyweight -91 kg	Roman Beskishkov (Russia)	Pavel Chichunov (Russia)	Milorad Gajović (Montenegro); Balazs Varga (Hungary)
Super Heavyweight +91 kg	Hamza Kendircioğlu (Turkey)	Kenan Akbulut (Germany)	Jukka Saarinen (Finland); Gabor Meiszter (Hungary)

=== Women's Full-Contact Kickboxing Medals Table ===
Event	Gold	Silver	Bronze
Bantamweight -48 kg	Valeria Calabrese (Italy)	Carina Maia (Portugal)	Heike Rings (Germany); Patrycja Kotlarz (Poland)
Featherweight -52 kg	Seda Duygu Aygun (Turkey)	Eva Maria Fernandez (Spain)	Katarzyna Czuba (Poland); Mette Solli (Norway)
Lightweight -56 kg	Lidia Andreeva (Russia)	Zsuzsanna Szuknai (Hungary)	Zuleika Turan (Turkey); Jutta Nordberg (Finland)
Middleweight -60 kg	Monika Florek (Poland)	Letizia Bitozzi (Italy)	Derya Adiguzel (Turkey); Katarina Ilicic (Croatia)
Light Heavyweight -65 kg	Chiara Mandelli (Italy)	Nicole Trimmel (Austria)	Vera Avdeeva (Russia); Carla Silva (Portugal)
Heavyweight -70 kg	Svetlana Kulakova (Russia)	Nadja Fritsche (Germany)	Natalie John (Germany); Yeliz Fındık (Turkey)
Super Heavyweight +70 kg	Adina Cocieru (Romania)	Mandalena Misir (Croatia)	Karen Dews (United Kingdom); Sabine Schnell (Germany)

== Semi-Contact ==
Semi-Contact is a form of kickboxing where the contestants are allowed to throw kicks and punches with minimal force at legal targets above the waist. Almost all matches are won via a point's decision with the fighters scored on strikes landed using skill, speed and technique with power prohibited. Despite the less physical nature of the style as with other forms of amateur kickboxing, head and body protection must be worn. More information on Semi-Contact can be found at the official W.A.K.O. website. At Lisbon the men had nine weight divisions ranging from 57 kg/125.4 lbs to over 94 kg/+206.8 lbs while the women had six, ranging from 50 kg/110 lbs to over 70 kg/154 lbs and there was also a mixed team event and unlike more recent W.A.K.O. championships some countries were allowed more than one athlete per weight division. Despite not having any household names there were a couple of repeat winners from the last world championships in Szeged, with Adriano Passoro and Gregorio Di Leo (four gold) picking up winners medals. By the end of the championships Italy beat off strong competition from Hungary to become the strongest nation in Semi-Contact, winning five golds, one silver and three silvers, while Germany won the team event.

=== Men's Semi-Contact Kickboxing Medals Table ===
Event	Gold	Silver	Bronze
-57 kg	Jason Doyle (Republic of Ireland)	Piotr Bakowski (Poland)	Dezső Debreczeni (Hungary); Maxim Aysin (Russia)
-63 kg	Adriano Passoro (Italy)	Viktor Hirsch (Hungary)	Miroslav Grgic (Croatia); Bert Hennissen (Belgium)
-69 kg	Gregorio Di Leo (Italy)	Krisztian Jaroszkievicz (Poland)	Ilija Salerno (Republic of Ireland); Christian Boujibar (Switzerland)
-74 kg	Morten Spissoy (Norway)	Harald Schimdt (Germany)	Robert McMenamy (Republic of Ireland); Nikos Memmos (Greece)
-79 kg	Zsolt Moradi (Hungary)	Roman Schläppi (Switzerland)	Dimitri Gaulis (Switzerland); Tobias Weiss (Germany)
-84 kg	Robert Knödelseder (Germany)	Owen King (United Kingdom)	Zvonimir Gribl (Croatia); Zoltan Dancso (Hungary)
-89 kg	Michel Decian (Switzerland)	Daniel Weil (Germany)	Peter Ciskos (Hungary); Marko Desa (Croatia)
-94 kg	Andrea Ongaro (Italy)	Colin O'Shaughnessy (Republic of Ireland)	Pero Gazilj (Croatia); Gunther Wenninger (Austria)
+94 kg	Marco Culiersi (Italy)	Andy Hogan (Republic of Ireland)	Özcan Çakmakçı (Turkey); Terry Hillman (United Kingdom)

=== Women's Semi-Contact Kickboxing Medals Table ===
Event	Gold	Silver	Bronze
-50 kg	Sharon Gill (United Kingdom)	Fadeeva Svetlana (Russia)	Monika Molnar (Hungary); Valentina Scorsonelli (Italy)
-55 kg	Lorraine McDermott (Republic of Ireland)	Linda Fogliano (Italy)	Maria Kushtanova (Russia); Betty Kovacs (Hungary)
-60 kg	Klara Marton (Hungary)	Emilia Szablowska (Poland)	Lisa Boardman (United Kingdom); Ida Abrahamsen (Norway)
-65 kg	Chiara Leonardi (Italy)	Melanie Moder (Germany)	Barbara Szendrei (Hungary); Vichy Praet (Belgium)
-70 kg	Ivett Pruzsinszky (Hungary)	Jemma Campbell (United Kingdom)	Joan Deegan (Republic of Ireland); Natalie Cassidy (Republic of Ireland)
+70 kg	Zsofia Minda (Hungary)	Nadja Sibila (Slovenia)	Romina Succi (Italy); Rosemarie James (United Kingdom)

=== Team Semi-Contact Kickboxing Medals Table ===
Event	Gold	Silver	Bronze
Team Semi-Contact	Germany	Hungary	Italy; Greece

== Musical Forms ==
Musical Forms is a type of non-physical competition which sees the contestants fighting against imaginary foes using Martial Arts techniques - more information on the style can be found on the W.A.K.O. website. Unlike other styles at Agadir there were no weight divisions only male and female competitions and competitors were allowed to compete in more than one category and some countries had more than one athlete in each category. The men and women at Lisbon competed in four different styles explained below:

- Hard Styles – coming from Karate and Taekwondo.
- Soft Styles – coming from Kung Fu and Wushu.
- Hard Styles with Weapons – using weapons such as Kama, Sai, Tonfa, Nunchaku, Bō, Katana.
- Soft Styles with Weapons - using weapons such as Naginata, Nunchaku, Tai Chi Chuan Sword, Whip Chain.

The most notable winner in the style was Andrey Bosak who won three golds and a silver medal across the four categories he competed in. Other winners who had also won at the last world championships in Agadir included Olga Kudinova and the highly decorated Veronica Dombrovskaya. By the end of the championships Russia dominated the style, winning five golds, seven silvers and two bronzes.

=== Men's Musical Forms Medals Table ===
Event	Gold	Silver	Bronze
Hard Styles	Kevin Cetout (France)	Andrey Bosak (Russia)	Andrey Savushkin (Russia)
Soft Styles	Andrey Bosak (Russia)	Evgeny Krylov (Russia)	Alberto Leonardi (Italy)
Hard Styles - Weapons	Andrey Bosak (Russia)	Andrey Savushkin (Russia)	Kevin Cetout (France)
Soft Styles - Weapons	Andrey Bosak (Russia)	Andrey Savushkin (Russia)	Michael Moeller (Germany)

=== Women's Musical Forms Medals Table ===
Event	Gold	Silver	Bronze
Hard Styles	Olga Kudinova (Russia)	Jessica Holmes (United Kingdom)	Maria Pekarchyk (Belarus)
Soft Styles	Veronika Dombrovskaya (Belarus)	Elena Chirkova (Russia)	Maria Pekarchyk (Belarus)
Hard Styles - Weapons	Maria Pekarchyk (Belarus)	Ekaterina Chizikova (Russia)	Anna Likhonina (Russia)
Soft Styles - Weapons	Ekaterina Chizhikova (Russia)	Elena Chirkova (Russia)	Maria Pekarchyk (Belarus)

== Aero-Kickboxing ==
Aero Kickboxing is a non-physical competition, involving participants using a mixture of aerobic and kickboxing techniques in time to specifically selected music. There are no weight divisions as with other forms of kickboxing in W.A.K.O. but there are separate male, female and team categories, with or without an aerobic step. As with Musical Forms, competitors were allowed to compete in more than one category and some countries had more than one athlete in each category. More information on Aero-Kickboxing and the rules can be found on the W.A.K.O. website. Although a fairly low profile sport, the most notable winner was Daniele De Santis who won both the men's categories as well as gaining a gold as part of the Italian team. These three gold medals helped propel Italy to the top of the leaderboard as the strongest country in Aero-Kickboxing.

=== Men's Aero-Kickboxing Medals Table ===
Event	Gold	Silver	Bronze
Aero Individual without Step	Daniele De Santis (Italy)	Cionel Burger (France)	Andreas Riem (Germany)
Aero Individual with Step	Daniele De Santis (Italy)	Cionel Burger (France)	Andreas Riem (Germany)

=== Women's Aero-Kickboxing Medals Table ===
Event	Gold	Silver	Bronze
Aero Individual without Step	Brigitta Gazdag (Hungary)	Bianca Topilatu (Slovenia)	Marina Lelic (Croatia)
Aero Individual with Step	Marina Lelic (Croatia)	Petra Kmetec (France)	Judith Fajka (Hungary)

=== Team Aero-Kickboxing Medals Table ===
Event	Gold	Silver	Bronze
Aero Individual without Step	Team Italy	Team Hungary	Team Bulgaria
Aero Individual with Step	Team Hungary	Team Croatia I	Team Croatia II

== Overall Medals Standing (Top 5) ==
Ranking	Country	Gold (gold)	Silver (silver)	Bronze (bronze)
1	Russia	14	11	11
2	Italy	11	2	4
3	Hungary	6	4	12
4	Germany	2	5	7
5	(Republic of Ireland) Ireland	2	2	4
5	Turkey	2	2	4

== See also ==
- List of WAKO Amateur European Championships
- List of WAKO Amateur World Championships
