= Women's Light-Contact at WAKO World Championships 2007 Belgrade -60 kg =

Kickboxing tournament

Women's Light-Contact Kickboxing at the W.A.K.O. World Championships 2007 (Belgrade)
-55 kg
-60 kg
-65 kg
-70 kg
+70 kg

The women's 60 kg (132 lbs) Light-Contact category at the W.A.K.O. World Championships 2007 in Belgrade was the second lightest of the female Light-Contact tournaments being the equivalent of the middleweight division when compared to the Low-Kick and K-1 weight classes. There were thirteen women taking part in the competition, all based in Europe. Each of the matches was three rounds of two minutes each and were fought under Light-Contact rules.

Due to the number of fighters unsuited for a tournament designed for sixteen, three women had byes through to the quarter-final stage. The tournament gold medalist was Hungarian Klara Marton who defeated Ireland's Julie McHale in the final by unanimous decision. Pole Monika Florek and Croatian Andrea Ivas claimed bronze medals.

== Results ==
1st round
(Sweden) Maria Persson	D(3:0)
(Slovakia) Svatava Spanikova
(Switzerland) Senqui Guzel	D(3:0)
(Germany) Katja Schatta
(Croatia) Andrea Ivas	D(3:0)
(Italy) Letizia Bitozzi
(Russia) Lilia Sharapova	D(3:0)
(Austria) Katrin Hofer
(France) Anne-Laure Gaudry
(Slovenia) Tamara Radkovic	D(3:0)

Quarter-finals
(Republic of Ireland) Julie McHale	D(3:0)
(Sweden) Maria Persson
(Poland) Monika Florek	D(3:0)
(Switzerland) Senqui Guzel
(Croatia) Andrea Ivas	D(3:0)
(Russia) Lilia Sharapova
(Slovenia) Tamara Radkovic
(Hungary) Klara Marton	D(3:0)

Semi-finals
(Republic of Ireland) Julie McHale	D(3:0)
(Poland) Monika Florek
(Croatia) Andrea Ivas
(Hungary) Klara Marton	D(3:0)

Final
(Republic of Ireland) Julie McHale
(Hungary) Klara Marton	D(2:1)

=== Key ===
Abbreviation	Meaning
D (3:0)	Decision (Unanimous)
D (2:1)	Decision (Split)

== See also ==
- List of WAKO Amateur World Championships
- List of WAKO Amateur European Championships
- List of female kickboxers
