= Jeffrey R. Di Leo =

- Born: Jeffrey R. Di Leo; Vineland, New Jersey, U.S.
- Education: Rutgers University, Indiana University
- Occupations: Author, Editor, Professor
- Writing career
- Period: Contemporary
- Genres: Essay, Theory and Criticism, Philosophy

Jeffrey R. Di Leo is a Distinguished Professor of English and Philosophy at Texas A&M University—Victoria. He is editor and founder of the critical theory journal symplokē, editor-in-chief of the American Book Review, and Executive Director of the Society for Critical Exchange and its Winter Theory Institute.

Di Leo is a former member of the Modern Language Association Delegate Assembly and a past president of the Society for Comparative Literature and the Arts.

He earned a BA in Philosophy and Economics from Rutgers University, New Brunswick, and an MA in Philosophy and an MA in Comparative Literature from Indiana University, Bloomington. He also completed a dual PhD in Philosophy and Comparative Literature at Indiana University. Di Leo has taught at Georgia Institute of Technology, the University of Houston—Victoria, and the University of Illinois at Chicago.

Born and raised in Vineland, New Jersey, Di Leo currently resides in Victoria, Texas, with his wife, Nina, and their two sons.

== Publications ==
=== Books ===
- Late Peirce: The Life and Thought of Charles S. Peirce from 1900-1914. Co-edited with Dinda L. Gorlée. (2026) ISBN 9781003567615
- A Dictionary of Philosophy by Charles S. Peirce: Volume 1, Contributions to Baldwin's Dictionary of Philosophy and Psychology. Edited with an introductory essay. (2026) ISBN 978-90-04-75122-4
- The Death Drive: Philosophy, Literature, Theory. Co-edited with Paul Allen Miller. (2026) ISBN 978-1350465671
- The is Not the End of Theory: Critical Perspectives on the Humanities in Dark Times. (2026) ISBN 978-1839999871
- Late Academe: Justice, Extinction, and the University. (2026) ISBN 978-3-032-21368-6
- Theory Across Disciplines. Edited with an introductory essay. (2025) ISBN 978-1-3504-2427-2
- Theory as World Literature. Edited with an introductory essay. (2025) ISBN 979-8-7651-0865-9
- Out of Print. (2024) ISBN 978-1-956782-61-5
- Dark Academe: Capitalism, Theory, and the Death Drive. (2024) ISBN 978-3-031-56350-8
- Left Theory and the Alt Right. Co-edited with Sophia A. McClennen. (2024) ISBN 978-1-032-54486-1
- Theory Conspiracy. Co-edited with Frida Beckman. (2024) ISBN 978-1-032-45016-2
- Contemporary Literary and Cultural Theory: An Overview. (2023) ISBN 978-1-350-36616-9
- Selling the Humanities. (2023) ISBN 978-1-68003-318-2
- Understanding Zizek, Understanding Modernism. Co-edited with Zahi Zalloua. (2023) ISBN 978-1-5013-9384-6
- The Bloomsbury Handbook of World Theory. Co-edited with Christian Moraru. (2022) ISBN 978-1-5013-6194-4
- Understanding Barthes, Understanding Modernism. Co-edited with Zahi Zalloua. (2022) ISBN 978-1-5013-6740-3
- Happiness.(2021) ISBN 978-1-032-01520-0
- Vinyl Theory. (2020) ISBN 978-1-64315-015-4
- Catastrophe and Higher Education: Neoliberalism, Theory, and the Future of the Humanities. (2020) ISBN 978-3-030-62478-1
- What's Wrong with Anti-Theory? Edited with an introductory essay. (2020) ISBN 978-1-350-23447-5
- Biotheory: Life and Death under Capitalism. Co-edited with Peter Hitchcock. (2020) ISBN 978-1-032-23886-9
- Philosophy as World Literature. Edited with an introductory essay. (2020) ISBN 978-1-5013-5187-7
- The End of American Literature: Essays from the Late Age of Print. (2019) ISBN 978-1-68003-178-2
- The Bloomsbury Handbook of Literary and Cultural Theory. (2019) ISBN 978-1-350-18361-2
- The Debt Age. Co-edited with Peter Hitchcock and Sophia McClennen. (2018) ISBN 978-1-138-56258-5
- Experimental Literature: A Collection of Statements. Co-edited with Warren Motte. (2018) ISBN 978-1-884097-20-1
- Higher Education under Late Capitalism: Identity, Conduct, and the Neoliberal Condition. (2017) ISBN 978-3-319-49857-7
- American Literature as World Literature. Edited with an introductory essay. (2017) ISBN 978-1-5013-5460-1
- Dead Theory: Derrida, Death, and the Afterlife of Theory. Edited with an introductory essay. (2016) ISBN 978-1-350-05417-2
- The New Public Intellectual: Politics, Theory, and the Public Sphere. Co-edited with Peter Hitchcock. (2016) ISBN 978-1-137-58575-2
- Corporate Humanities in Higher Education: Moving Beyond the Neoliberal Academy. (2014) ISBN 978-1-349-47342-7
- Criticism after Critique: Aesthetics, Literature, and the Political. Edited with an introductory essay. (2014) ISBN 978-1-137-42876-9
- Turning the Page: Book Culture in the Digital Age. (2014) ISBN 978-1-937875-51-0
- Capital at the Brink: Overcoming the Destructive Legacies of Neoliberalism. Co-edited with Uppinder Mehan. (2013) ISBN 978-1-60785-306-0
- Neoliberalism, Education, Terrorism: Contemporary Dialogues. Co-authored with Henry Giroux, Sophia A. McClennen, and Ken Saltman. (2013) ISBN 978-1-61205040-9
- Terror, Theory, and the Humanities. (2014) ISBN 978-1-61205-040-9
- Federman’s Fictions: Innovation, Theory, and the Holocaust. Edited with an introductory essay. (2011) ISBN 978-1-4384-3382-0
- Academe Degree Zero: Reconsidering the Politics of Higher Education.(2010) ISBN 978-1-59451-889-8
- Fiction’s Present: Situating Contemporary Narrative Innovation. Co-edited with R.M. Berry. (2008) ISBN 978-0-7914-7264-4
- From Socrates to Cinema: An Introduction to Philosophy. (2007) ISBN 978-0-07-296906-1
- If Classrooms Matter: Progressive Visions of Educational Environments. Co-edited with Walter R. Jacobs. (2004) ISBN 978-0-415-97158-4
- On Anthologies: Politics and Pedagogy. Edited with an introductory essay. (2004) ISBN 978-0-8032-6644-5
- Affiliations: Identity in Academic Culture. Edited with an introductory essay. (2003) ISBN 978-0-8032-6636-0
- Morality Matters: Race, Class and Gender in Applied Ethics. (2002) ISBN 978-0-7674-1236-0

=== Selected Articles ===
- "Adorno on Vinyl." Understanding Adorno, Understanding Modernism. Ed. Robin Goodman (Bloomsbury, 2020)
- "Self-Publishing: Transforming Ways of Writing and Reading." World Authorship: Oxford Twenty-First Century Approaches to Literature. Ed. Tobias Boes, Rebecca Braun, and Emily Spiers (Oxford, 2020)
- "Late Capitalism on Vinyl: Neoliberalism, Biopolitics, and Music." CR: The New Centennial Review. (2018)
- "Philosophy without Apologies." American Book Review. (2018)
- "Independent Presses." American Literature in Transition: 1990-2000. Ed. Stephen J. Burn (Cambridge, 2017)
- "Don't Shoot the Journal Editor." American Book Review. (2018)
- "Running with the Pack: Why Theory Needs Community."Intertexts. (2017)
- "Digital Fatigue." American Book Review. (2016)
- "Who's Afraid of Self-Publishing?" Notre Dame Review. (2016)
- "Bootleg Scholarship." American Book Review. (2016)
- "Higher Pleasure: In Defense of Academic Hedonism." The Comparatist. (2015)
- "Is Higher Ed Working Class?" Rhizomes. (2014)
- "Can Theory Save the Planet?: Critical Climate Change and the Limits of Theory."symploke. (2013)
- "Robots in the Stacks." American Book Review. (2013)
- "When University Presses Fail." Inside Higher Ed. (2012)
- "The Executor’s Dilemma." American Book Review. (2011)
- "The Cult of the Book—and Why It Must End." Chronicle of Higher Education. (2010)
- "In Praise of Tough Criticism."Chronicle of Higher Education. (2010)
- "Do Androids Dream of Anna Karenina?" American Book Review. (2010)
- "The Fate of the Book Review." Journal of Scholarly Publishing. (2009)
- "Against Anonymity." Inside Higher Ed. (2009)
- "Public Intellectuals, Inc." Inside Higher Ed. (2008)
- "Policing the Borders of Birmingham: Cultural Studies, Semiotics and the Politics of Repackaging Theory." Semiotica. (2000)
- "Text."The Oxford Encyclopedia of Aesthetics. (1998)
- "Charles Peirce’s Theory of Proper Names." Studies in the Logic of Charles Sanders Peirce. (1997)
- "Unlimited Semiosis in Literature." Southern Review. (1994)
- "Peirce’s Haecceitism." Transactions of the Charles S. Peirce Society. (1991)
