= How to Break a World Record =

- Official movie artwork
- Directed by: Andrew P. Oliver, Dan Johnson
- Produced by: Andrew P. Oliver, Dan Johnson
- Starring: Stephen Oliver, Andrew P. Oliver, Dan Johnson
- Production company: Forthright Records
- Distributed by: Freestyle Digital Media
- Release dates: October 7, 2023 (Tryon International Film Festival); June 25, 2024
- Running time: 84 Minutes
- Country: United States
- Language: English

How to Break a World Record is a 2023 American reality-style music documentary film about a band's journey to break a Guinness World Record. The film was directed by Andrew P. Oliver and Dan Johnson, and it follows Stephen Oliver as he attempts to break the world record for 'longest marathon playing mandolin'. The film was released on June 25, 2024 to streaming platforms via Freestyle Digital Media.

== Summary ==
How To Break A World Record follows Stephen Oliver, mandolin player for the band Brother Oliver, and his bandmates as they set out to break a Guinness World Record for the 'longest marathon playing mandolin'.

The characters run into unexpected challenges, most notably a rival mandolinist out of Assam, India by the name of Kuntal Raj Chakrabortty, who states that he will be attempting the world record at nearly the same time.

The movie then details the grueling attempt in which Stephen plays a mandolin for over 27 hours straight while showcasing the guidelines and rules of the Guinness World Record breaking process.

== Appearances ==
- Stephen Oliver
- Andrew P. Oliver
- Dan Johnson
- Kuntal Raj Chakrabortty

== Release ==
How to Break a World Record premiered on October 7, 2023, at the Tryon International Film Festival, and was shown at the South Carolina Underground Film Festival, the Reedy Reels Film Festival, and the South Georgia Film Festival. The movie officially released on VOD on June 25, 2024.

== Awards ==
- Audience Choice Award - 2023 Tryon International Film Festival
- Best Documentary - 2023 South Carolina Underground Film Festival
- Film of Distinction - 2024 Reedy Reels Film Festival
