= Women's Light-Contact at WAKO World Championships 2007 Belgrade -70 kg =

Kickboxing tournament

Women's Light-Contact Kickboxing at the W.A.K.O. World Championships 2007 (Belgrade)
-55 kg
-60 kg
-65 kg
-70 kg
+70 kg

The women's 70 kg (154 lbs) Light-Contact category at the W.A.K.O. World Championships 2007 in Belgrade was the second heaviest of the female Light-Contact tournaments being the equivalent of the heavyweight division when compared to the Low-Kick and K-1 weight classes. There were eight women taking part in the competition, all based in Europe. Each of the matches was three rounds of two minutes each and were fought under Light-Contact rules.

The tournament was won by Poland's Agnieszka Poltorak who defeated Swede Karin Edenius in the final by split decision. Dianna Cameron from the United Kingdom and Nikolina Juricev from Croatia claimed bronze medals.

== Results ==
Quarter Finals
(Italy) Annalista Ghilardi
(Sweden) Karin Edenius	D(3:0)
(United Kingdom) Dianna Cameron	D(2:1)
(Austria) Sandra Binz
(Poland) Agnieszka Poltorak	D(2:1)
(Russia) Anastasia Zavolokina
(Croatia) Nikolina Juricev	D(3:0)
(Germany) Katja Möhle

Semi Finals
(Sweden) Karin Edenius	D(3:0)
(United Kingdom) Dianna Cameron
(Poland) Agnieszka Poltorak	D(2:1)
(Croatia) Nikolina Juricev

Final
(Sweden) Karin Edenius
(Poland) Agnieszka Poltorak	D(2:1)

=== Key ===
Abbreviation	Meaning
D (3:0)	Decision (Unanimous)
D (2:1)	Decision (Split)

== See also ==
- List of WAKO Amateur World Championships
- List of WAKO Amateur European Championships
- List of female kickboxers
