= Dinda L. Gorlée =

Dutch semiotician and translation theorist

- Born: 1943 (age 82–83)
- Known for: Semiotranslation
- Awards: Mouton d'Or (2016)

Academic background
- Education: University of Groningen, University of Amsterdam

Academic work
- Discipline: Semiotics, translation studies
- Institutions: University of Bergen, Indiana University Bloomington, University of Helsinki
- Notable works: Semiotics and the Problem of Translation (1994)

Dinda Liesbeth Gorlée (born 1943) is a Dutch semiotician and translation theorist. She developed semiotranslation, an approach to translation based on the sign theory of Charles Sanders Peirce. Her research covers the semiotics of Peirce, the philosophy of Ludwig Wittgenstein, Roman Jakobson's typology of translation, and the vocal translation of songs, opera, and hymns. Invited by Thomas Sebeok, she worked at the Research Center for Language and Semiotic Studies at Indiana University Bloomington, and she has been a research associate at the Wittgenstein Archives of the University of Bergen since 2004. She received the 2016 Mouton d'Or, the annual best-article prize of the journal Semiotica, and has been series editor of the book series Semiotics: Signs of the Times (Brill) since 2022.

== Work ==
Gorlée's monograph Semiotics and the Problem of Translation: With Special Reference to the Semiotics of Charles S. Peirce (1994) argues that phenomena commonly called translation are forms of semiosis, and connects Peirce's theory of signs with translation theory. The semiotician Evangelos Kourdis describes the book as pioneering work for the interpretive, Peircean approach within the semiotics of translation. The book was reviewed by Elda Weizman in Target.

Her second monograph, On Translating Signs: Exploring Text and Semio-Translation (2004), continues this program. Reviewing it in Babel, Moheiddin Homeidi called it a substantial contribution to the study of signs and to Peirce scholarship. Ubaldo Stecconi reviewed the book in Target. In her 2008 doctoral dissertation at the University of Helsinki, Ritva Hartama-Heinonen adopted Gorlée's semiotranslation as her theoretical framework, examined its development, and extended it through the concept of abductive translation.

Gorlée also studies vocal translation, the translation of texts that are sung. She edited the volume Song and Significance: Virtues and Vices of Vocal Translation (2005), with essays on hymns, opera libretti, folk songs, and popular music. Reviewing it in The Journal of Specialised Translation, Lucile Desblache wrote that the volume addressed an area of translation studies that had been little explored.

In Wittgenstein in Translation: Exploring Semiotic Signatures (2012), Gorlée examines the translation of Wittgenstein's German writings and seeks to combine the semiotic methods of Wittgenstein and Peirce. In his review for the Nordic Wittgenstein Review, Horst Ruthrof notes that the book responds to the absence of a multilingual glossary for translating Wittgenstein.

Her later books extend translation into transduction, the transfer of meaning between language and other art forms. From Translation to Transduction: The Glassy Essence of Intersemiosis (2015) appeared in the Tartu Semiotics Library. From Mimetic Translation to Artistic Transduction (2023) analyzes works by Virginia Woolf, Hector Berlioz, and Bertolt Brecht.

== Education and career ==
Gorlée studied Spanish, Dutch, English, Portuguese, and Swedish languages, general linguistics, and comparative literature at the University of Groningen from 1961 to 1968. She received an M.A. summa cum laude in Spanish, English, and Portuguese linguistics and literature in 1968. In 1993 she obtained a PhD in translation studies and semiotics from the University of Amsterdam.

She taught Spanish linguistics and translation at the University of Groningen, and was senior associate professor of Spanish linguistics and philosophy of language at the University of Bergen from 1983 to 1991, where she worked at the Wittgenstein Archives. At the invitation of Thomas Sebeok, she was a research associate at the Research Center for Language and Semiotic Studies at Indiana University Bloomington from 1988 to 1992, and a visiting scholar at the Peirce Edition Project in Indianapolis. She held visiting professorships in translation studies at universities including São Paulo, Ouagadougou, Vienna, and Innsbruck, and was visiting professor of semiotics and translation theory at the University of Helsinki from 2001 to 2005. Since 2004 she has been a research associate at the Wittgenstein Archives of the University of Bergen.

Outside academia, Gorlée qualified as a sworn legal translator and court interpreter for Dutch and Spanish in 1981, and directed a legal translation agency in The Hague from 1997 to 2012.

Gorlée was the first president of the Nordic Association for Semiotic Studies (NASS), which was founded in Imatra, Finland, in 1987. She is a member of the Collegium of the International Association for Semiotic Studies (IASS). Since 2022 she has been series editor of the book series Semiotics: Signs of the Times, published by Brill Publishers.

In 2016 Gorlée received the Mouton d'Or for her article "Wittgenstein's persuasive rhetoric". The Mouton d'Or is the annual prize of Semiotica, the journal of the IASS, awarded by an independent international jury to the best article of the year.

== Selected publications ==
=== Books ===
- Semiotics and the Problem of Translation: With Special Reference to the Semiotics of Charles S. Peirce. Amsterdam: Rodopi, 1994.
- On Translating Signs: Exploring Text and Semio-Translation. Amsterdam: Rodopi, 2004.
- Song and Significance: Virtues and Vices of Vocal Translation (editor). Amsterdam: Rodopi, 2005.
- Wittgenstein in Translation: Exploring Semiotic Signatures. Berlin: De Gruyter Mouton, 2012.
- From Translation to Transduction: The Glassy Essence of Intersemiosis. Tartu: Tartu University Press, 2015.
- From Mimetic Translation to Artistic Transduction: A Semiotic Perspective on Virginia Woolf, Hector Berlioz, and Bertolt Brecht. London: Anthem Press, 2023.
- Wittgenstein & Semiotics (editor). Semiotics, Signs of the Times 2. Brill, 2025.
- Late Peirce: The Life and Thought of Charles S. Peirce from 1900–1914 (editor, with Jeffrey R. Di Leo). Routledge, 2026.

=== Articles ===
- "Wittgenstein, Translation, and Semiotics". Target 1 (1), 1989. doi:10.1075/target.1.1.06gor
- "Wittgenstein's persuasive rhetoric". Semiotica 208, 2016. doi:10.1515/sem-2015-0121
