= Marko Tomasović (boxer) =

Croatian boxer

Medal record

Men's Boxing

Representing Croatia

Mediterranean Games
Silver medal – second place	Pescara 2009	+91 kg

Marko Tomasović (born November 10, 1981) is a Croatian boxer and kickboxer, best known for qualifying for the 2008 Summer Olympics at Super heavyweight. He is 185 cm (6 ft 1 in) tall and weighs 99 kg (218 lb).

== Career ==
In 2005, Tomasović entered the W.A.K.O. World Amateur Kickboxing Championships in Szeged, Hungary where he made it to the final of the heavyweight division (91 kg/200.2 lbs) in full-contact, only to lose out on a gold medal against Denys Simkin.

As an amateur boxer in 2007, Tomasović made it to the 2007 World Championships, where he lost his first bout to David Price. He also returned to kickboxing that year with W.A.K.O. for the world championships in Coimbra, Portugal, making the final of the super heavyweight division and winning a silver medal.

At the Olympic qualifications he defeated Kurban Günebakan, got a walkover over Magomed Abdusalamov and surprisingly beat Robert Helenius 16:7, thus qualifying for Beijing. In Beijing at the Summer Olympics he ran right into Italian world champion Roberto Cammarelle and lost his debut.

== Titles ==
Professional kickboxing

- 2006 K-1 Hungary runner up
- 2006 W.A.K.O. Pro Full-Contact Rules European Champion (1 title defence)

Amateur kickboxing

- 2010 W.A.K.O. European Championships in Loutraki, Greece (gold) +91 kg (full-contact)
- 2007 W.A.K.O. World Championships in Coimbra, Portugal (silver) +91 kg (full-contact)
- 2005 W.A.K.O. World Championships in Szeged, Hungary (silver) -91 kg (full-contact)

== Fight record ==
Professional kickboxing record
Date	Result	Opponent	Event	Location	Method	Round	Time
2010-09-25	Loss	(Croatia) Marin Došen	Fight Night	Viškovo, Croatia	Decision (unanimous)	3	2:00
2010-06-12	Loss	(Spain) Damian Garcia		Palma de Mallorca, Spain	KO	4	
For W.A.K.O. Pro K-1 Rules European title +94.100 kg.
2010-03-27	Win	(Bosnia and Herzegovina) Adis Dadović	Obračun u Ringu 10	Split, Croatia	TKO	2	
2009-03-21	Win	(Serbia) Milan Dašić	K-1 ColliZion 2009 Croatia	Split, Croatia	Decision (unanimous)	3	3:00
2007-01-20	Win	(Italy) Agostino Pavesi		Milan, Italy	Decision	10	2:00
Defends W.A.K.O. Pro Full-Contact Rules European Championship -94.100 kg..
2006-08-18	Loss	(Azerbaijan) Zabit Samedov	K-1 Hungary 2006	Debrecen, Hungary	KO	1	
For K-1 Hungary 2006 tournament title.
2006-08-18	Win	(Algeria) Zinedine Hameur-Lain	K-1 Hungary 2006	Debrecen, Hungary			
2006-08-18	Win	(Hungary) Gabor Meizster	K-1 Hungary 2006	Debrecen, Hungary			
2006-04-29	Win	(Hungary) Balasz Varga	Obračun u Ringu IV	Split, Croatia	Decision (unanimous)	10	2:00
Wins W.A.K.O. Pro Full-Contact Rules European Championship -94.100 kg..
Legend: Win Loss Draw/no contest Notes

Amateur kickboxing record
Date	Result	Opponent	Event	Location	Method	Round	Time
2010-11-27	Win	(Poland) Wojciech Jastrzębski	W.A.K.O European Championships 2010, Full-Contact Final +91 kg	Loutraki, Greece	Decision (split)	3	2:00
Wins W.A.K.O. World Championship '10 Full-Contact Gold Medal +91 kg.
2010-11-25	WO	(France) Damon Jeremy	W.A.K.O European Championships 2010, Full-Contact Semi Finals +91 kg	Loutraki, Greece	WO (no fight)		
2010-11-22	Win	(Slovakia) Tomaš Možny	W.A.K.O European Championships 2010, Full-Contact Quarter Finals +91 kg	Loutraki, Greece	Decision (unanimous)	3	2:00
2010-11-25	Win	(Turkey) Kadir Yirdilim	W.A.K.O European Championships 2010, Full-Contact First Round +91 kg	Loutraki, Greece	Decision (unanimous)	3	2:00
2007-12	Loss	(Russia) Alexey Tokarev	W.A.K.O European Championships 2007, Full-Contact Final +91 kg	Coimbra, Portugal	Decision (unanimous)	3	2:00
Wins W.A.K.O. World Championship '07 Full-Contact Silver Medal +91 kg.
2007-11	Win	(Finland) Jukka Saarinen	W.A.K.O European Championships 2007, Full-Contact Semi Finals +91 kg	Coimbra, Portugal	Decision (split)	3	2:00
2007-11	Win	(Azerbaijan) Hafiz Bahshhalyev	W.A.K.O European Championships 2007, Full-Contact Quarter Finals +91 kg	Coimbra, Portugal	Decision (split)	3	2:00
2007-11	Win	(South Africa) Eddie Theron	W.A.K.O European Championships 2007, Full-Contact 1st Round +91 kg	Coimbra, Portugal	Decision (split)	3	2:00
2005-12	Loss	(Poland) Denis Simkin	W.A.K.O European Championships 2005, Full-Contact Final -91 kg	Szeged, Hungary			
Wins W.A.K.O. World Championship '05 Full-Contact Silver Medal -91 kg.
2005-12	Win	(Hungary) Balazs Varga	W.A.K.O European Championships 2005, Full-Contact Semi Finals -91 kg	Szeged, Hungary			
Legend: Win Loss Draw/no contest Notes
