= Nicole Trimmel =

Austrian kickboxer

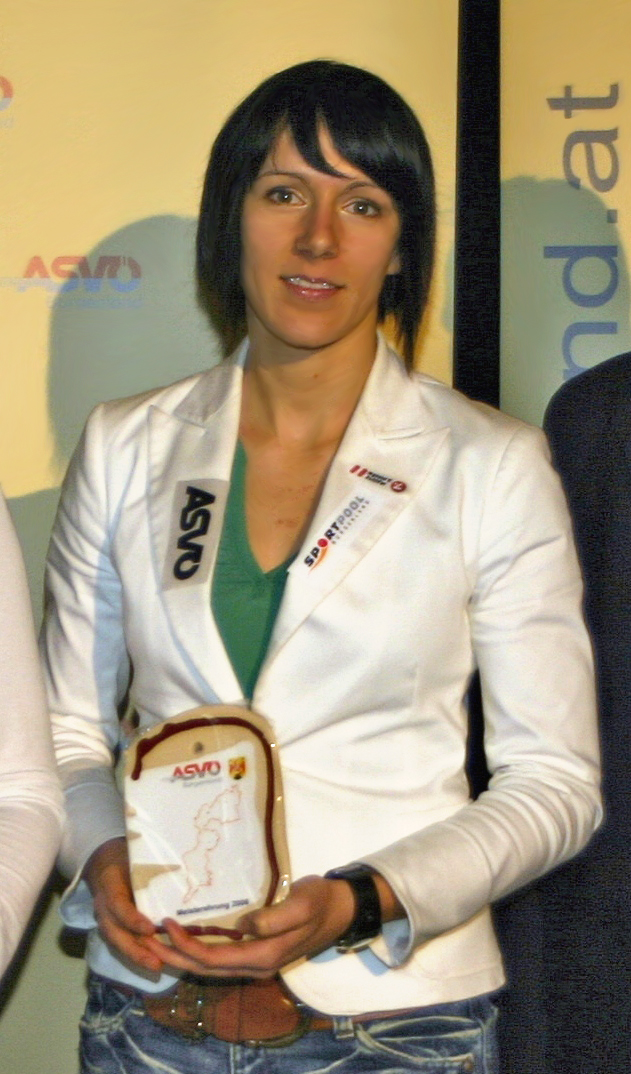
- Trimmel in 2006
- Born: Nicole Trimmel; October 13, 1982 (age 44); Vienna, Austria
- Other names: Nicoletta
- Nationality: Austrian
- Height: 1.68 m (5 ft 6 in)
- Weight: 65 kg (143 lb; 10.2 st)
- Style: Kickboxing
- Team: KBC Rohrbach

Kickboxing record
- Total: 27
- Wins: 23
- By knockout: 5
- Losses: 4
- Draws: 0
- No contests: 0

Nicole Trimmel (born October 13, 1982), is an Austrian kickboxer. She is a multiple World Champion and European Champion in Kickboxing. Since 2004 she holds the title of Austrian Champion in Kickboxing for each year. In 2004 and 2005 she was awarded Burgenland's Sportswoman of the Year. The following year, Trimmel received an Order of Merit by the Republic of Austria and by the Federal State Burgenland respectively.

== Early life and education ==
Nicole Trimmel was born in Vienna, Austria to Anita and Walter Trimmel. Her brother is Roland Trimmel. Having spent the early years of her life in Vienna the family decided to move back to Oslip, the parent's hometown, in 1986.

The fascination of martial arts took Nicole Trimmel already when being a small child. However, the path to kickboxing included a number of other sports, such as athletics and women's soccer, in which all of them she was successful. It was not until 1997, while in secondary school, that she first experienced martial arts during a self-defense course. Her enthusiasm grew quickly, but it was not until 1999 that Nicole Trimmel began her kickboxing career at KBC Rust.

== Career ==
=== Early career (1999–2003) ===
At KBC Rust coach Joachim Huber immediately recognised the talent of Nicole Trimmel for kickboxing. Thoroughly preparing her for the first national championship, she won the Austrian Youth Champion title on first attempt. Further achievements on national level followed. Consequently, in 2002 she was called up to join the Austrian national team for kickboxing. The same year she started at the IAKSA World Championships in Kickboxing in Caorle, Italy. The fight for entry into the final was accompanied by nervousness - she lost, eventually. In 2003 Trimmel changed to ASVÖ KBC Rohrbach, but remained loyal to coach Joachim Huber.

=== Breakthrough (2003–2004) ===
The breakthrough came 2003 at the IAKSA World Championships in Kickboxing in Miami, Florida, U.S. As an underdog, she managed to score two Vice-World Champion titles in juniors- and general class. Again, a number of titles at national as well as international tournaments followed.

=== Critical success (2004–present) ===
The critical success came 2004 at the IAKSA / WKA World Championships in Kickboxing in Basel, Switzerland. Nicole Trimmel made it straight to the final, where she went for World Champion in Kickboxing in discipline light contact. In addition, at the same event she scored twice as Vice-World Champion in Kickboxing in disciplines semi contact and team respectively. Ever since Trimmel has shown a strong performance at national as well as international kickboxing tournaments: in 2005 she became three-time World Champion in Kickboxing at the IAKSA World Championships in Moscow, Russia – disciplines included team, hard- and semi contact. In 2006 only the WAKO European Championships in Kickboxing took place in Lisbon, Portugal, where she made it to Vice-European Champion in Kickboxing in discipline full contact. In 2007, she went on to become a two-time Vice-World Champion in Kickboxing, in full-contact and light-contact categories respectively. Since 2004, Nicole Trimmel has held the title of Austrian Champion in Kickboxing every year. She has remained on top of the podium ever since, scoring gold and silver medals in the years following. As such, she currently holds the top spot in WAKO Pro-competitions - the highest professional level achievable in kickboxing - on a national and international level. This was further rounded off by becoming European Champion in 2010 - a first for Nicole Trimmel.

A complex knee injury kept her from competing in most competitions in 2011, however immediately after recovery she stepped to the top once more in becoming the World Champion in Kickboxing at the WAKO Kickboxing Championships in Skopje, Macedonia. That was followed some weeks later by another World Championship title in full-contact in Dublin, Ireland.

These achievements were acknowledged by the vote for Burgenland's Sportswoman of the Year in 2004 and 2005. In 2006 Trimmel received the Silver Order of Merit of the Republic of Austria, which was followed by the Golden Order of Merit of Federal State Burgenland – both, for her achievements in sports and for representing the country internationally. In a survey for ‘The Top 100 VIPs of Burgenland’ by the Austrian magazine News readers voted her on place 19 in February 2007.

== Personal life ==
=== Charitable work ===
Nicole Trimmel recently uses her popularity more publicly noticed to participate in charitable work targeted at children and youths. In 2007, she contributed as guest instructor to the Spark7 Slam Tour, an initiative to foster youths for (sports) exercise. Besides, Trimmel is developing a concept to bring the issues regarding climate change and environmental protection closer to people, in particular to children and youth.

== Achievements ==
Year	International	National
2013	W.A.K.O. World Championships in Antalya Champion (Light-Contact)	Austrian Champion (Light- and Semi-Contact)
2011	World Champion (Light- and Full-Contact)	Austrian Champion (Light- and Semi-Contact)
2010	European Champion (Light-Contact)	Austrian Champion (Light- and Semi-Contact)
2009	WAKO Pro World Champion (Full-Contact)	Austrian Champion (Light- and Full-Contact)
2008	Vice-European Champion (Light contact)	WAKO Pro Austria Champion (Full-Contact with Low-Kick); Austrian Champion (Light- and Semi-Contact)
2007	W.A.K.O. World Championships in Coimbra Vice-Champion (Full-Contact); W.A.K.O. World Championships in Belgrade Vice-Champion (Light-Contact)	Austrian Champion (Light-, Semi- and Full-Contact, Low-Kick)
2006	W.A.K.O. European Championships in Lisbon Vice-Champion (Full-Contact); W.A.K.O. European Championships in Skopje 3rd Place (Light-Contact)	Austrian Champion (Hard-, Light- and Full-Contact)
2005	World Champion (Team, Hard- and Semi contact)	Austrian Champion (Hard-, Light- and Full-Contact)
2004	World Champion (Light-Contact); Vice-World Champion (Team and Semi contact)	Austrian Champion (Semi-Contact)
2003	Vice-World Champion (Semi-Contact)	Austrian Vice-Champion (Semi-Contact)

== Awards ==
- Golden Order of Merit of Federal State Burgenland
- Silver Order of Merit of the Republic of Austria
- Burgenland's Sportswoman of the Year 2005
- Burgenland's Sportswoman of the Year 2004

== See also ==
- Kickboxing
- Martial arts
- List of Austrians
- List of female kickboxers
