= W.A.K.O. World Championships 2005 (Szeged) =

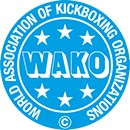
- The poster for W.A.K.O. World Championships 2005 (Szeged)
- Promotion: W.A.K.O.
- Date: 28 November (Start); 5 December 2005 (End)
- Venue: Városi Sportcsarnok
- City: Szeged, Hungary
- Attendance: 4,000

Event chronology
| W.A.K.O. World Championships 2005 (Agadir) | W.A.K.O. World Championships 2005 (Szeged) | W.A.K.O. European Championships 2006 (Lisbon) |

W.A.K.O. World Championships 2005 in Szeged were the joint fifteenth world championships held by the W.A.K.O. organization and the third ever to be held in Hungary - with the other event having been held a couple of months earlier in Agadir, Morocco. The championships in Szeged were open to amateur men and women from across the world with around 720 athletes from 48 countries across five continents taking part.

There were four styles on offer at Szeged; Full-Contact, Light-Contact, Semi-Contact and Aero-Kickboxing. The other styles (Low-Kick, Thai-Boxing and Musical Forms) were held at the Agadir event. By the end of the championships, Russia were the strongest nation overall, followed closely by hosts Hungary, with Italy in third place. The event was held at the Városi Sportcsarnok in Szeged, Hungary on Monday, 28 November to Monday, 5 December 2005 in front of a crowd of around 4,000.

== Participating nations ==
There were around 48 nations from five continents across the world participating at the 2005 W.A.K.O. World Championships in Szeged including:

- Austria
- Belgium
- Bosnia and Herzegovina
- Brazil
- Bulgaria
- Canada
- Croatia
- Cyprus
- Czech Republic
- Denmark
- Estonia
- Finland
- France
- Germany
- (United Kingdom) Great Britain
- Hungary
- Iran
- Iraq
- (Republic of Ireland) Ireland
- Israel
- Italy
- Kazakhstan
- Kenya
- Latvia
- Liechtenstein
- Mexico
- Morocco
- New Zealand
- Nepal
- Nigeria
- Norway
- Poland
- Portugal
- Romania
- Russia
- Seychelles
- Slovakia
- Slovenia
- Spain
- Syria
- Sweden
- Switzerland
- Turkey
- Ukraine
- United States

== Full-Contact ==
Full-Contact is a form of kickboxing where the contestants are allowed to throw punches and kicks at full force at legal targets above the waist. Victories are usually achieved via a point's decision or referee stoppage (e.g. KO/TKO) and as with most other forms of amateur kickboxing, all participants must wear the required head and body protection. More information on Full-Contact kickboxing and the rules can be found on the official W.A.K.O. website. Both men and women had competitions at Szegad, with the men having twelve weight divisions ranging from 51 kg/112.2 lbs to over 91 kg/+200.2 lbs and the women seven, ranging from 48 kg/105.6 lbs to over 70 kg/+143 lbs.

Despite there not being as many familiar faces taking part in the style as in the past, there were a number of double winners who had won at the last European championships in Budva, with Zurab Faroyan and Daniel Martins picking up gold medals. There were also several winners who had won at the 2003 world championships in Paris with Jere Reinikainen and Karolina Lukasik winning gold, while Igor Kulbaev did even better by picking up his third gold medal in a row at a W.A.K.O. championships having also won at Budva and Paris. Regular leaders Russia were once again the top nation in Full-Contact, winning six gold, four silver and five bronze medals in both the male and female categories.

=== Men's Full-Contact Kickboxing Medals Table ===
| Event | Gold | Silver | Bronze | |
|---|---|---|---|---|
| Light Bantamweight -51 kg | Iwan Bityutskikh (Russia) | Almhid Mntsar (Syria) | Joaquín Céspedes Salas (Spain); Amir Tnalin (Kazakhstan) | |
| Bantamweight -54 kg | Gabor Aburko (Hungary) | Igor Pavlenko (Ukraine) | Mokhmad Betmirzaev (Russia); Tomasz Makowski (Poland) | |
| Featherweight -57 kg | Zurab Faroyan (Russia) | Rkaibi Mounir (Morocco) | Nurbolat Rysmagambetov (Kazakhstan); Hosseim Azimi Zamen (Iran) | |
| Lightweight -60 kg | Daniel Martins (France) | Sandor Kornel (Hungary) | Zlatomir Dimitrov (Bulgaria); Evgeniy Khil (Russia) | |
| Light Welterweight -63.5 kg | Arild Mikarlsen (Norway) | Biagio Tralli (Italy) | Olexandr Gibert (Ukraine); Abdukhalim Bakhtiyev (Kazakhstan) | |
| Welterweight -67 kg | Jere Reinikainen (Finland) | Eldin Raonic (Bosnia and Herzegovina) | Michelle Manzoni (Italy); Pavel Tarik (Russia) | |
| Light Middleweight -71 kg | Igor Kulbaev (Russia) | Mariusz Ziętek (Poland) | Dmytro Yatskov (Ukraine); Robert Arvai (Hungary) | |
| Middleweight -75 kg | Azamat Belgibaev (Kazakhstan) | Mhiyaoui Azzeddine (Morocco) | Martin Nachev (Bulgaria); Manuchari Pipiya (Russia) | |
| Light Heavyweight -81 kg | Denis Grachev (Russia) | Mamadou Traoré (France) | David Nogode (Slovenia); Almat Serimon (Kazakhstan) | |
| Cruiserweight -86 kg | Stephen Thompson (United States) | Sergey Bodgan (Russia) | Jonathan Gromark (Sweden); Mairis Briedis (Latvia) | |
| Heavyweight -91 kg | Ninel Ianculescu (Romania) | Denys Simkin (Ukraine) | Marko Tomasović (Croatia) | Yerzhan Shegenov (Kazakhstan); Balazs Varga (Hungary) |
| Super Heavyweight +91 kg | Yuri Abramov (Russia) | Michal Wszelak (Poland) | Kenan Akbulat (Germany); Jukka Saarinen (Finland) | |

=== Women's Full-Contact Kickboxing Medals Table ===
| Event | Gold | Silver | Bronze |
|---|---|---|---|
| -48 kg | Valeria Calabrese (Italy) | Jenny Hardingz (Sweden) | Helena Kalinowski (Germany); Nawal Bouzlaf (Morocco) |
| -52 kg | Fatma Akyüz (Germany) | Anna Krivoguzova (Russia) | Maris Joeveer (Estonia); Mette Solli (Norway) |
| -56 kg | Zsuzsanna Szuknai (Hungary) | Lidia Andreeva (Russia) | Jutta Nordberg (Finland); Natalie Kalinowski (Germany) |
| -60 kg | Monika Florek (Poland) | Olga Zyk (Russia) | Valeriya Kurlyuk (Kazakhstan); Sanja Samardzic (Bosnia and Herzegovina) |
| -65 kg | Vera Avdeeva (Russia) | Anne Katas (Finland) | Chiara Mandelli (Italy); Rita Parkanyi (Hungary) |
| -70 kg | Karolina Lukasik (Poland) | Nives Radic (Croatia) | Elena Solareva (Russia); Tetyana Ivashchenko (Ukraine) |
| +70 kg | Samira El Haddad (Morocco) | Jenna Droluk (United States) | Adina Cocieru (Romania); Galina Ivanova (Russia) |

== Light-Contact ==
Light-Contact is a form of kickboxing where the contestants can aim kicks and punches thrown with moderate force at legal targets above the waist. It is less physical than Full-Contact but more so than Semi-Contact and is often seen as a transitional stage by fighters wishing to eventually move on to fully physical competition. Most fights are settled by a point's decision although stoppages can occur and like with other forms of amateur kickboxing, head and body protection must be worn. More information on Light-Contact can be found at the W.A.K.O. website. At Szeged the men had nine weight divisions ranging from 57 kg/125.4 lbs to over 94 kg/+206.8 lbs while the women had six, ranging from 50 kg/110 lbs to over 70 kg/154 lbs.

While not full of Nnticeable names there were a few stand out winners in Light-Contact with James Stewart and Tonje Sørlie winning two gold medals at the same championships (they would win in Semi-Contact as well) and regular winners Zoltan Dancso, Klara Morton and Nusa Rajher also picking up winners medals. By the end of the event Hungary were the strongest country in Light-Contact, winning four gold, four silver and two bronze medals.

=== Men's Light-Contact Kickboxing Medals Table ===
| Event | Gold | Silver | Bronze |
|---|---|---|---|
| -57 kg | Maxim Aysin (Russia) | Dezső Debreczeni (Hungary) | Bakyttay Aukenov (Kazakhstan); Przemyslaw Rekowski (Poland) |
| -63 kg | Evgeny Mayer (Russia) | Sándor Szántó (Hungary) | Bengt Karlsson (Sweden); Kostyantyn Demoretskyy (Ukraine) |
| -69 kg | Ruslan Ishmakov (Russia) | Gregory Larbi (France) | Rudolf Grega (Slovenia); Timur Hamidullin (Estonia) |
| -74 kg | Ales Zemljic (Slovenia) | Jerzy Wronski (Poland) | Mario Butschkat (Germany); Oliver Stricz (Hungary) |
| -79 kg | Zoltan Dancso (Hungary) | Christophe Touzeau (France) | Konstantin Seitov (Russia); Andrea Primitivi (Italy) |
| -84 kg | Jeno Novak (Hungary) | Mariusz Niziolek (Poland) | Fabian Fingerhut (Germany); Marat Pukhaev (Russia) |
| -89 kg | Michael Reinbold (Germany) | Gavin Williamson (United Kingdom) | Wojciech Myslinski (Poland); Tibor Wappel (Hungary) |
| -94 kg | Christian Schulz (Germany) | Agostino Pavesi (Italy) | Vladimir Celar (Croatia); Bartłomiej Bocian (Poland) |
| +94 kg | James Stewart (Canada) | Rishat Kabirov (Russia) | Merlin Gehrt (Germany); Mark Graden (United States) |

=== Women's Light-Contact Kickboxing Medals Table ===
| Event | Gold | Silver | Bronze |
|---|---|---|---|
| -50 kg | Reka Krempf (Hungary) | Alexandra Kibanova (Russia) | Heidi Williamsson (Sweden); Florence Zaaboula (France) |
| -55 kg | Tonje Sørlie (Norway) | Roxane Laszak (France) | Christina McMahon (Republic of Ireland); Żaneta Cieśla (Poland) |
| -60 kg | Klara Marton (Hungary) | Julie McHale (Republic of Ireland) | Julia Göldner (Germany); Sara Reale (Italy) |
| -65 kg | Katarzyna Furmaniak (Poland) | Marianna Hudak (Hungary) | Sabina Sehic (Slovenia); Louise Dixon (United Kingdom) |
| -70 kg | Nusa Rajher (Slovenia) | Ivett Pruzsinszky (Hungary) | Katja Moehle (Germany); Karoline Ek (Sweden) |
| +70 kg | Mieke Hink (United Kingdom) | Oxana Kinakh (Russia) | Stefanie Hildebrandt (Germany); Szabina Domokos (Croatia) |

== Semi-Contact ==
Semi-Contact is a form of kickboxing where the contestants are allowed to punch and kick one another at legal targets above the waist with minimal force being applied. Almost all matches are settled by a point's decision with the judges scoring on the basis of speed, technique and skill with power prohibited. Despite the less physical nature of the style, various head and body protection is mandatory. More information on Semi-Contact can be found at the W.A.K.O. website. As with Light-Contact the men had nine weight divisions ranging from 57 kg/125.4 lbs to over 94 kg/+206.8 lbs while the women had six, ranging from 50 kg/110 lbs to over 70 kg/154 lbs.

Although not full of glamorous names there were several notable winners in Semi-Contact with James Stewart and Tonje Sørlie winning two gold medals at the same championships (they would win in Light-Contact as well) and winners Dezső Debreczeni, Gregorio Di Leo (third gold medal in a row) and Luisa Lico also picking up medals. By the end of the championships, as with Light-Contact, Hungary were the leaders in Semi-Contact beating competition from Italy, winning three golds, three silvers and two bronze medals.

=== Men's Semi-Contact Kickboxing Medals Table ===
| Event | Gold | Silver | Bronze |
|---|---|---|---|
| -57 kg | Dezső Debreczeni (Hungary) | Maxim Aysin (Russia) | Miroslav Grgic (Croatia); Piotr Bakowski (Poland) |
| -63 kg | Adriano Passoro (Italy) | Viktor Hirsch (Hungary) | Robert Haugh (Republic of Ireland); Philippe Rossi (France) |
| -69 kg | Gregorio Di Leo (Italy) | Christian Boujibar (Switzerland) | Krisztian Jaroszkievicz (Hungary); Daniel Harrison (United Kingdom) |
| -74 kg | Alexander Lane (United States) | Jacey Cashman (United Kingdom) | Robert McMenamy (Republic of Ireland); Bjorn Baert (Belgium) |
| -79 kg | Jason Brown (Canada) | Kurt Baert (Belgium) | Neri Stella (Italy); Faton Rexhaj (Germany) |
| -84 kg | Zvonimir Gribl (Croatia) | Robert Knödelseder (Germany) | Christoph Steinlechner (Austria); Drew Neal (United Kingdom) |
| -89 kg | Peter Ciskos (Hungary) | Joseph Greenhalgh (United States) | Marko Desa (Croatia); David Heffernan (Republic of Ireland) |
| -94 kg | Pero Gazilj (Croatia) | Colin O'Shaughnessy (Republic of Ireland) | Andrea Ongaro (Italy); Mark Brown (United Kingdom) |
| +94 kg | James Stewart (Canada) | Daniel Haendel (Germany) | Marco Culiersi (Italy); Seppi Patterer (Austria) |

=== Women's Semi-Contact Kickboxing Medals Table ===
| Event | Gold | Silver | Bronze |
|---|---|---|---|
| -50 kg | Fadeeva Svetlana (Russia) | Samantha Aquilano (Italy) | Reka Krempf (Hungary); Andreja Ivas (Croatia) |
| -55 kg | Tonje Sørlie (Norway) | Betty Kovacs (Hungary) | Dorota Godzina (Poland); Galani Panagiota (Greece) |
| -60 kg | Luisa Lico (Italy) | Carolin Pitzke (Germany) | Christina Szytenchelm (Poland); Vedrana Halincic (Croatia) |
| -65 kg | Elaine Small (Republic of Ireland) | Barbara Szendrei (Hungary) | Patricia Berlingieri (Switzerland); Lisa Boardman (United Kingdom) |
| -70 kg | Natalie Cassidy (Republic of Ireland) | Ana Znaor (Croatia) | Ivett Pruzsinszky (Hungary); Adelaide Callegari (Italy) |
| +70 kg | Barbara Kovacs (Hungary) | Oxana Kinakh (Russia) | Sonya Coakley-Hanan (Republic of Ireland); Romina Succi (Italy) |

== Overall medals standing (top 5) ==
| Ranking | Country | Gold (gold) | Silver (silver) | Bronze (bronze) |
|---|---|---|---|---|
| 1 | Russia | 10 | 9 | 6 |
| 2 | Hungary | 9 | 8 | 7 |
| 3 | Italy | 4 | 3 | 9 |
| 4 | Poland | 3 | 4 | 9 |
| 5 | Germany | 3 | 3 | 10 |

== See also ==
- List of WAKO Amateur World Championships
- List of WAKO Amateur European Championships
