= Stephen Thompson (fighter) =

American mixed martial artist (born 1983)

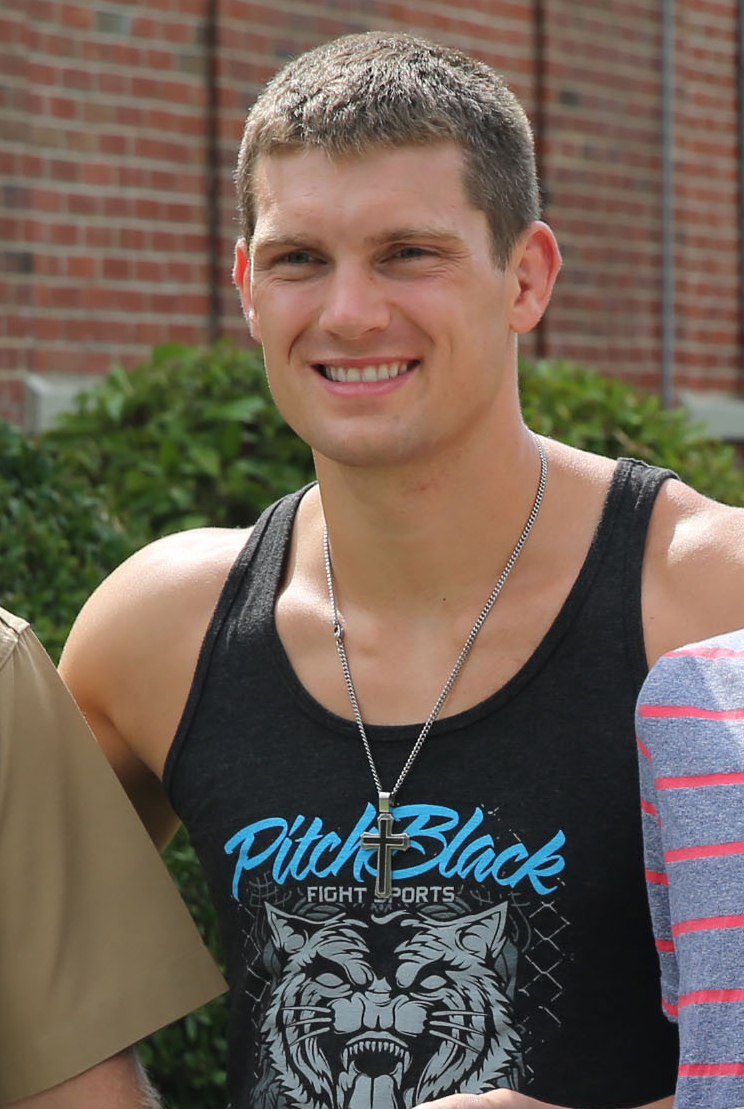
- Stephen Thompson in 2013
- Born: Stephen Randall Thompson; February 11, 1983 (age 43); Simpsonville, South Carolina, U.S.
- Nickname: Wonderboy
- Height: 6 ft 0 in (1.83 m)
- Weight: 170 lb (77 kg; 12 st 2 lb)
- Division: Welterweight
- Reach: 75 in (191 cm)
- Style: Kickboxing
- Fighting out of: Simpsonville, South Carolina, U.S.
- Team: Upstate Karate; Pitch Black MMA; Serra-Longo Fight Team
- Trainer: Ray Thompson; Carlos Machado
- Rank: 7th degree black belt in American Tetsushin-ryū Kempo; 1st degree black belt in Jujutsu; Black belt in American Kickboxing; Brown belt in Brazilian Jiu-Jitsu under Carlos Machado
- Years active: 2010–2026 (MMA)

Kickboxing record
- Total: 21
- Wins: 20
- By knockout: 10
- Losses: 0
- No contests: 1

Mixed martial arts record
- Total: 28
- Wins: 18
- By knockout: 9
- By submission: 1
- By decision: 8
- Losses: 9
- By knockout: 2
- By submission: 1
- By decision: 6
- Draws: 1

Other information
- Website: wonderboymma.com
- Mixed martial arts record from Sherdog
Medal record
Men's Full-Contact Kickboxing
Representing United States
W.A.K.O. World Amateur Championships
Gold medal – first place	2005 Szeged	-86kg

YouTube information
- Channel: Stephen Wonderboy Thompson
- Subscribers: 591 thousand
- Views: 66.8 million
- Last updated: January 17, 2026

Stephen Randall Thompson (born February 11, 1983) is an American former professional mixed martial artist and former professional kickboxer. Thompson competed in the Welterweight division of the Ultimate Fighting Championship (UFC) where he was a former two-time UFC Welterweight Championship challenger. As a full-contact kickboxer, Thompson was undefeated through 37 amateur and 21 professional matches. Thompson is regarded as one of the most accomplished strikers in the UFC.

Thompson is well known for his polite demeanor, and is often cited by other fighters as one of the most respectful fighters in the UFC.

== Early life ==
Thompson was born on February 11, 1983, in Simpsonville, South Carolina. He has two sisters and two brothers. Thompson started training at the age of three, under the guidance of his father, Ray Thompson, a former professional kickboxer and owner of Upstate Karate, a karate school in Simpsonville, South Carolina.

Thompson started competing in kickboxing and karate at the age of 15. He holds black belt ranks in Tetsushin-ryū Kempo, American Kickboxing and Jujutsu. He studies Brazilian Jiu-Jitsu under Carlos Machado who is also his brother-in-law. Thompson graduated from high school in 2001 and is the Head Instructor of the children's karate program at Upstate Karate.

== Mixed martial arts career ==
=== Early career in kickboxing ===
Thompson's father, Ray, is his trainer and manager.

As an amateur kickboxer Thompson amassed 16 titles and finished his career with a record of 37 wins, 18 by knockout and no losses.

He turned professional on May 15, 2004 against Kadir Kadri who he defeated by knockout in the fifth round.

On December 14, 2004 Thompson traveled to Montreal, Canada to face Eric Boudreau at "La renaissance du Kickboxing" event. He won the fight by technical knockout in the fifth round.

On May 21, 2005 Thompson rematched Kadir Kadri at Martial Arts May-Hem 05 in Greenville, South Carolina. He won the fight by unanimous decision.

On September 3, 2005 Thompson faced Freddie Espiricueta at the APEX – Undisputed event in Montreal, Canada. Thompson won the fight by technical knockout in the third round.

Thompson has also been featured in Martial Arts Digest magazine, Fighter magazine, and MMA Authority magazine.

Thompson has performed along with his father at the Peace Center for the Performing Arts in the “Athletes Project”, and has appeared in several TV commercials.

In 2006, Thompson joined the newly created World Combat League. He went undefeated during that year earning wins over opponents such as Antoine McRae, Armin Mrkanovic, James DeCore, Tim Williams and Carlos Tearney. He was the #1 ranked fighter in World Combat League at the end of 2006.

On January 20, 2007 Thompson fought Raymond Daniels in a highly anticipated bout. Thompson lost the bout by technical knockout due to a knee injury he suffered that left him unable to continue. However, this was later overturned into a no contest.

During his recovery Thompson chose to transition from kickboxing to professional mixed martial arts.

=== Ultimate Fighting Championship ===
==== 2012 ====
Thompson was expected to face Justin Edwards on February 4, 2012, at UFC 143, replacing an injured Mike Stumpf. However, Edwards was forced out with an injury and replaced by Dan Stittgen. Thompson won the fight via KO in the first round after landing a flush head kick. For his performance, Thompson was awarded Knockout of the Night honors.

Thompson lost to Matt Brown on April 21, 2012, at UFC 145 via unanimous decision (30–27, 29–27, and 30–27).

Thompson was expected to face Besam Yousef on November 17, 2012, at UFC 154. However, Thompson was forced out of the bout with a knee injury and replaced by Matthew Riddle.

==== 2013 ====
Thompson was expected to face Amir Sadollah on May 25, 2013, at UFC 160. However, Sadollah pulled out of the bout, citing an injury, and he was replaced by Nah-Shon Burrell. Thompson won the fight via unanimous decision.

Thompson next faced Chris Clements on September 21, 2013, at UFC 165. After dropping Clements twice, Thompson won the fight via knockout in the second round.

==== 2014 ====
Thompson faced future UFC middleweight champion Robert Whittaker on February 22, 2014, at UFC 170. Thompson won the bout via first-round technical knockout. The win also earned him his first Performance of the Night bonus award.

Thompson faced Patrick Côté on September 27, 2014, at UFC 178. Despite knocking Côté down in the third round and almost finishing the bout, Thompson ultimately won the fight via unanimous decision.

==== 2015 ====
Thompson was expected to headline against Brandon Thatch on February 14, 2015, at UFC Fight Night 60. However, Thompson pulled out of the fight on January 30, citing a rib injury, and was replaced by former UFC Lightweight Champion Benson Henderson.

Thompson faced Jake Ellenberger on July 12, 2015, at The Ultimate Fighter 21 Finale. He won the fight via KO in the first round and earned a Performance of the Night bonus.

==== 2016 ====
Thompson was expected to face Neil Magny on January 2, 2016, at UFC 195. However, Magny was tabbed as an injury replacement for Matt Brown and instead faced Kelvin Gastelum on November 21, 2015, at The Ultimate Fighter Latin America 2 Finale. In turn, Thompson was removed from the card and rebooked to face former champion Johny Hendricks on February 6, 2016, at UFC Fight Night 82. He won the bout via TKO in the first round. The win also earned Thompson his third Performance of the Night bonus award.

Thompson next faced Rory MacDonald on June 18, 2016, at UFC Fight Night 89. He won the fight via unanimous decision (50–45, 50–45, and 48–47).

Thompson fought for the UFC Welterweight Championship at UFC 205, where he faced reigning champion Tyron Woodley. The fight ended in a majority draw with two judges scoring the fight 47–47 and the third 48–47 in favor of Woodley. However, there was some confusion as the result was initially announced as a split decision victory for Woodley only to be corrected moments later when the decision of a majority draw was announced, albeit with the same result of Woodley remaining champion. Subsequently, both fighters were awarded Fight of the Night bonus awards. UFC President Dana White stated that he expected that a rematch would be next for each fighter.

==== 2017 ====
The rematch with Woodley took place on March 4, 2017, in the main event at UFC 209. Thompson lost the bout by majority decision (48–47, 47–47, and 48–47). In a sample of 19 media pundits scoring the fight, five scored it in favor of Woodley, six scored in favor of Thompson, and eight scored it a draw.

Thompson faced Jorge Masvidal on November 4, 2017 at UFC 217. He won the one-sided fight via unanimous decision (30–26, 30–27, and 30–27).

==== 2018 ====
As the first bout of his new multi-fight contract, Thompson faced Darren Till on May 27, 2018 at UFC Fight Night 130. At the weigh-ins, Till weighed in at 174.5 pounds, 3.5 pounds over the welterweight non-title fight limit of 171. After negotiating with Thompson's team, the bout proceeded at a catchweight, with the stipulation that Till could not weigh more than 188 pounds on the day of the fight. Till also forfeited 30 percent of his purse to Thompson. Thompson lost the bout via unanimous decision (48–47, 49–46, and 49–46). Conversely, 22 of 25 media outlets scored the bout in favor of Thompson.

==== 2019 ====
Thompson faced former UFC lightweight champion Anthony Pettis in the headliner of UFC Fight Night 148 on March 23, 2019. Despite outstriking Pettis for most of the bout, he lost the fight via knockout in the second round, marking the first time that Thompson had been stopped in MMA or kickboxing competition.

Thompson faced Vicente Luque on November 2, 2019 at UFC 244. He won the fight via unanimous decision. This fight earned him the Fight of the Night award.

==== 2020 ====
Thompson faced Geoff Neal on December 19, 2020 in the headliner UFC Fight Night 183. He won the fight via unanimous decision. This win earned him the Performance of the Night award.

==== 2021 ====
Thompson faced Gilbert Burns on July 10, 2021 at UFC 264 He lost the fight via unanimous decision.

As the first bout of his new six-fight contract, Thompson faced Belal Muhammad on December 18, 2021 at UFC Fight Night: Lewis vs. Daukaus. He lost via unanimous decision after ending up in bottom position on the ground for a large portion of each round.

==== 2022 ====
Thompson faced Kevin Holland on December 3, 2022, at UFC on ESPN 42, in the main event. He won the fight by technical knockout after Holland's corner stopped the fight after the fourth round. This fight earned both the Fight of the Night award.

==== 2023 ====
Thompson was scheduled to face Michel Pereira at UFC 291 on July 29, 2023. However, at the weigh-ins, Pereira weighed at 174 pounds, 3 pounds over the non-title welterweight limit. As a result, the bout was scrapped.

Thompson faced Shavkat Rakhmonov on December 16, 2023, at UFC 296. He lost the fight via a rear-naked choke submission in the second round.

==== 2024 ====
Thompson faced Joaquin Buckley on October 5, 2024 at UFC 307 in Salt Lake City, Utah. He lost the fight by knockout in the third round.

==== 2025 ====
Thompson faced Gabriel Bonfim on July 12, 2025 at UFC on ESPN 70. He lost the fight by split decision. 12 out of 14 media outlets scored the bout for Thompson.

==== 2026 ====
In his retirement fight, Thompson faced Charles Radtke on November 14, 2026 at UFC 334. He won the fight by technical knockout via a spinning wheel kick in the third round and retired from mixed martial arts competition after the fight. This fight earned him a $100,000 Performance of the Night award.

== Fighting style ==
Thompson was well known for his Kempo style of karate which he has trained in from an early age. This karate background is evident in the stance he adopts, as his feet stand far apart and he sits wide with his hands low. This style is very uncommon in MMA, with most fighters having a background in wrestling or jiu-jitsu, or striking arts like boxing, muay thai, or other styles of kickboxing. His footwork is described as "hopping back and forth", like other practitioners do such as Conor McGregor, Robert Whittaker and Zhang Weili. The benefit of this "hopping" while in neutral is that, like the low or non-existent guard, your striking and movement becomes unpredictable.

His wide, hopping karate stance allows him to cover distance and launch kicks rapidly. Analysts and fighters have praised 'Wonderboy' for his ability to keep other fighters in his range whilst staying out of theirs. The risk of being knocked out compels most fighters to keep their hands up in 'guard', but Thompson, among others such as Jiří Procházka, keeps his hands very low. The benefits of a very low guard are that your punches and elbows become very hard to predict, and one is better prepared to defend against takedowns. Thompson is more suited to keeping his hands low than other fighters who adopt more orthodox MMA stances, as he can negate the risk of being hit with a clean shot to the head through his footwork and rapid movement.

== Personal life ==
Thompson's sister is married to Carlos Machado and Thompson's brother, Tony, is married to Chris Weidman's sister.

In 2017, he signed a contract with international modeling agency IMG Models.

== Entertainment career ==
In 2022, Thompson made his acting debut as Sensei Morozov in two episodes of season 5 of the Netflix series Cobra Kai.

Thompson appears in the 2025 documentary film Paperweight.

== Championships and accomplishments ==
=== Amateur full-contact kickboxing ===
All championship information from WonderBoyMMA.com

- 1999 I.S.K.A Georgia State Middleweight Amateur Champion
- 2000 I.S.K.A Southeast Middleweight Amateur Champion
- 2000 I.K.F South East Light Middleweight Amateur Champion
- 2000 I.K.F National Amateur Tournament Middleweight Champion
- 2000 P.K.C National Light Middleweight Amateur Champion
- 2000 U.S.A.K.B.F North American Middleweight Amateur Champion
- 2001 P.K.C National Light Heavyweight Amateur Champion
- 2001 U.S.A.K.B.F Light Heavyweight Amateur World Champion
- 2001 W.P.K.A Light Heavyweight Amateur World Champion
- 2001 I.K.F National Tournament Light Heavyweight Champion
- 2002 I.K.F National Tournament Light Heavyweight Champion
- 2002 I.K.F North American Light Cruiserweight Champion
- 2003 I.K.F World Light Cruiserweight Champion
- 2003 K.I.C.K North American Cruiserweight Champion
- 2003 I.A.K.S.A Cruiserweight World Champion
- 2005 W.A.K.O World Championships Cruiserweight Champion

=== Mixed martial arts ===
- Ultimate Fighting Championship
  - Fight of the Night (Three times) vs. Tyron Woodley 1, Vicente Luque and Kevin Holland
  - Knockout of the Night (One time) vs. Dan Stittgen
  - Performance of the Night (Five times) vs. Robert Whittaker, Jake Ellenberger, Johny Hendricks, Geoff Neal and Charles Radtke
    - Tied (Matt Brown & Vicente Luque) for second most Post-Fight bonuses in UFC Welterweight division history (9) (behind Chris Lytle)
  - Tied (Jake Ellenberger & Matt Brown) for third most knockdowns landed in UFC Welterweight division history (11)
  - Fourth most significant strikes landed in UFC Welterweight division history (1360)
  - Fourth most total fight time in UFC Welterweight division history (5:32:25)
  - Tied (Robbie Lawler & Carlos Prates) for sixth most knockouts in UFC Welterweight division history (7)
  - UFC.com Awards
    - 2012: Ranked #8 Knockout of the Year vs. Dan Stittgen
    - 2015: Ranked #6 Knockout of the Year vs. Jake Ellenberger
    - 2016: Ranked #7 Fighter of the Year & Ranked #5 Fight of the Year vs. Tyron Woodley 1
    - 2022: Ranked #4 Fight of the Year vs. Kevin Holland
- MMA Junkie
  - 2022 December Fight of the Month vs. Kevin Holland
- CBS Sports
  - 2016 #10 Ranked UFC Fighter of the Year
  - 2016 #5 Ranked UFC Fight of the Year vs. Tyron Woodley

== Mixed martial arts record ==
Professional record breakdown
28 matches	18 wins	9 losses
By knockout	9	2
By submission	1	1
By decision	8	6
Draws	1	

Res.	Record	Opponent	Method	Event	Date	Round	Time	Location	Notes
Win	18–9–1	Charles Radtke	TKO (spinning wheel kick)	UFC 334	November 14, 2026	3	2:54	New York City, New York, United States	Performance of the Night.
Loss	17–9–1	Gabriel Bonfim	Decision (split)	UFC on ESPN: Lewis vs. Teixeira	July 12, 2025	3	5:00	Nashville, Tennessee, United States	
Loss	17–8–1	Joaquin Buckley	KO (punch)	UFC 307	October 5, 2024	3	2:17	Salt Lake City, Utah, United States	
Loss	17–7–1	Shavkat Rakhmonov	Submission (rear-naked choke)	UFC 296	December 16, 2023	2	4:56	Las Vegas, Nevada, United States	
Win	17–6–1	Kevin Holland	TKO (corner stoppage)	UFC on ESPN: Thompson vs. Holland	December 3, 2022	4	5:00	Orlando, Florida, United States	Fight of the Night.
Loss	16–6–1	Belal Muhammad	Decision (unanimous)	UFC Fight Night: Lewis vs. Daukaus	December 18, 2021	3	5:00	Las Vegas, Nevada, United States	
Loss	16–5–1	Gilbert Burns	Decision (unanimous)	UFC 264	July 10, 2021	3	5:00	Las Vegas, Nevada, United States	
Win	16–4–1	Geoff Neal	Decision (unanimous)	UFC Fight Night: Thompson vs. Neal	December 19, 2020	5	5:00	Las Vegas, Nevada, United States	Performance of the Night.
Win	15–4–1	Vicente Luque	Decision (unanimous)	UFC 244	November 2, 2019	3	5:00	New York City, New York, United States	Fight of the Night.
Loss	14–4–1	Anthony Pettis	KO (punches)	UFC Fight Night: Thompson vs. Pettis	March 23, 2019	2	4:55	Nashville, Tennessee, United States	
Loss	14–3–1	Darren Till	Decision (unanimous)	UFC Fight Night: Thompson vs. Till	May 27, 2018	5	5:00	Liverpool, England	Catchweight (174.5 lb) bout; Till missed weight.
Win	14–2–1	Jorge Masvidal	Decision (unanimous)	UFC 217	November 4, 2017	3	5:00	New York City, New York, United States	
Loss	13–2–1	Tyron Woodley	Decision (majority)	UFC 209	March 4, 2017	5	5:00	Las Vegas, Nevada, United States	For the UFC Welterweight Championship.
Draw	13–1–1	Tyron Woodley	Draw (majority)	UFC 205	November 12, 2016	5	5:00	New York City, New York, United States	For the UFC Welterweight Championship. Fight of the Night.
Win	13–1	Rory MacDonald	Decision (unanimous)	UFC Fight Night: MacDonald vs. Thompson	June 18, 2016	5	5:00	Ottawa, Ontario, Canada	
Win	12–1	Johny Hendricks	TKO (punches)	UFC Fight Night: Hendricks vs. Thompson	February 6, 2016	1	3:31	Las Vegas, Nevada, United States	Performance of the Night.
Win	11–1	Jake Ellenberger	KO (spinning wheel kick)	The Ultimate Fighter: American Top Team vs. Blackzilians Finale	July 12, 2015	1	4:29	Las Vegas, Nevada, United States	Performance of the Night.
Win	10–1	Patrick Côté	Decision (unanimous)	UFC 178	September 27, 2014	3	5:00	Las Vegas, Nevada, United States	
Win	9–1	Robert Whittaker	TKO (punches)	UFC 170	February 22, 2014	1	3:43	Las Vegas, Nevada, United States	Performance of the Night.
Win	8–1	Chris Clements	TKO (punches)	UFC 165	September 21, 2013	2	1:27	Toronto, Ontario, Canada	
Win	7–1	Nah-Shon Burrell	Decision (unanimous)	UFC 160	May 25, 2013	3	5:00	Las Vegas, Nevada, United States	
Loss	6–1	Matt Brown	Decision (unanimous)	UFC 145	April 21, 2012	3	5:00	Atlanta, Georgia, United States	
Win	6–0	Dan Stittgen	KO (head kick)	UFC 143	February 4, 2012	1	4:13	Las Vegas, Nevada, United States	Knockout of the Night.
Win	5–0	Patrick Mandio	Decision (unanimous)	Fight Party: Masquerade Fight Party	October 1, 2011	3	5:00	Atlanta, Georgia, United States	
Win	4–0	William Kuhn	Decision (unanimous)	Xtreme Chaos 2	July 15, 2011	3	5:00	Anderson, South Carolina, United States	
Win	3–0	Marques Worrell	Submission (rear-naked choke)	Fight Party: Greenville Kage Fighting 2	September 18, 2010	2	3:08	Greenville, South Carolina, United States	
Win	2–0	Daniel Finz	TKO (punches)	Fight Party: Xtreme Cage Fighting 2	May 22, 2010	1	3:45	Greenville, South Carolina, United States	
Win	1–0	Jeremy Joles	TKO (head kick and punches)	Fight Party: Greenville Kage Fighting	February 5, 2010	2	3:40	Greenville, South Carolina, United States	

== Pay-per-view bouts ==
No.	Event	Fight	Date	Venue	City	PPV buys
1.	UFC 209	Woodley vs. Thompson 2	March 4, 2017	T-Mobile Arena	Paradise, Nevada, United States	300,000

== Kickboxing record (incomplete) ==
Professional Kickboxing record
20 Wins (10 KOs), 0 Loss, 1 No Contest
Date	Result	Opponent	Event	Location	Method	Round	Time
2007-01-20	NC	(United States) Raymond Daniels	World Combat League	Philadelphia, Pennsylvania, USA	Knee injury	1	
originally a TKO (injury) loss for Thompson, overturned to a NC
2006-11-10	Win	(United States) Carlos Tearney	World Combat League	Miami, Florida, United States	Points	2	3:00
2006-	Win	(United States) Tim Williams	World Combat League	United States	KO (Head kick)	1	
2006-	Win	(United States) James DeCore	World Combat League	United States	KO (Head kick)	1	
2006-	Win	(United States) Armin Mrkanovic	World Combat League	United States	Points	1	3:00
2006-	Win	(United States) Antoine McRae	World Combat League	United States	TKO (Referee stoppage)	1	
2006-01-21	Win	(United States) Jose Louriero	World Combat League	Miami, Florida, United States	TKO (Referee stoppage)	1	
2006-01-21	Win	(United States) John Marzullo	World Combat League	Miami, Florida, United States	Points		
2005-09-03	Win	(United States) Freddie Espiricueta	APEX - UNDISPUTED	Montreal, Canada	TKO	3	0:47
2005-07-02	Win	(Canada) Walter Baric		Montreal, Canada	KO (Right cross)	1	
2005-05-21	Win	(United States) Kadir Kadri	Martial Arts May-Hem 05	Greenville, South Carolina, United States	Decision (Unanimous)	7	2:00
2004-12-14	Win	(Canada) Eric Boudreau	La renaissance du Kickboxing	Montreal, Canada	TKO (Right cross)	5	
2004-11-06	Win	(United States) Jason Reeves	IKF Full Contact Kickboxing	Simpsonville, South Carolina, United States	KO (Right cross)	1	
2004-05-15	Win	(United States) Kadir Kadri	IKF Full Contact Kickboxing	Simpsonville, South Carolina, United States	TKO (Left hook to the body)	5	
2002-07-19	Win	(United States) Eli Thompson	ISKA 21st Century Warriors	Atlantic City, United States	TKO	2	1:24
Legend: Win Loss Draw/No contest Notes

Amateur Kickboxing record
37 Wins (18 KOs), 0 Loss
Date	Result	Opponent	Event	Location	Method	Round	Time
2005-12-05	Win	(Russia) Sergei Bogdan	2005 WAKO World Championships, Final	Szeged, Hungary	Decision (Unanimous)	3	2:00
Wins 2005 WAKO World Championships Full Contact Cruiserweight (-86 kg) Gold Medal.
2005-12-04	Win	(Latvia) Mairis Briedis	2005 WAKO World Championships, Semi Final	Szeged, Hungary	Decision	3	2:00
2005-12-03	Win	(United Kingdom) Marlon Hunt	2005 WAKO World Championships, Quarter Final	Szeged, Hungary			
2005-12-02	Win	(Italy)	2005 WAKO World Championships, 1/8 Final	Szeged, Hungary			
2003-11-15	Win	(United States) Kevin Engle	IKF Full Contact Kickboxing	Greenville, South Carolina, United States	Decision (Unanimous)	5	2:00
Wins IKF World Full Contact Light Cruiserweight title.
2003-05-19	Win	(United States) Bill Jardine	Martial Arts May-Hem	Greenville, South Carolina, United States	Decision (Unanimous)	5	3:00
2003-01-26	Win	(Mexico) Alejandro Garcia Lopez	IKF Team World Cup	Cancun, Mexico	TKO	2	1:07
2002-11-16	Win	(United States) Bill Jardine	IKF Full Contact Kickboxing	Greenville, South Carolina, United States	TKO (Ref. Stoppage/Punches)	4	1:26
Wins IKF North American Full Contact Light Cruiserweight title.
2002-08-04	Win	(United States) John Scanlon	2002 IKF USA National Amateur Championship Tournament, Final	Davenport, Iowa, United States	KO (Head kick)	1	1:37
Wins 2002 IKF USA National Amateur Championship Full-Contact Light Heavyweight title.
2002-03-16	Win	(United States) Ruben Lopez	IKF Full Contact Kickboxing	Augusta, Georgia, United States	TKO (arm injury)	2	1:24
Wins IKF South East USA Full-Contact Light Heavyweight title.
2001-11-10	Win	(United States) Nicholas Donahue	IKF: The Fall Brawl 2001	Greenville, South Carolina, United States	KO (Axe kick + punch)	2	0:20
2001-09-09	Win	(Laos) Vilavahn Seukpanya	2001 IKF USA National Amateur Championship Tournament, Final	Olathe, Kansas, United States	TKO (Broken arm/Kick)	1	0:14
Wins 2001 IKF USA National Amateur Championship Full-Contact Light Heavyweight title.
2001-07-14	Win	(United States) Claudiu Bucur	IKF: South East Regional Selection 2001	Atlanta, Georgia, United States	KO (Head kick)	3	0:50
2001-06-16	Win	(United States) Demetrius Jones	IKF: Hot Summer Fights 2001	Valdosta, Georgia, United States	TKO (retirement)	1	2:00
2000-09-03	Win	(United States) Peyton Russell	2000 IKF USA National Amateur Championship Tournament, Final	Olathe, Kansas, United States	Decision (Unanimous)	3	2:00
Wins 2000 IKF USA National Amateur Championship Full-Contact Middleweight title.
2000-09-02	Win	(United States) Mike Mason	2000 IKF USA National Amateur Championship Tournament, Semi Final	Council Bluffs, Iowa, United States	Decision (Unanimous)	3	2:00
2000-06-24	Win	(United States) JR Barnard	IKF: Hot Summer Fights 2000	Valdosta, Georgia, United States	TKO (Referee stoppage)	3	
2000-05-06	Win	(United States) Keith Esskuchen	IKF: Spring Showdown 2000	Augusta, Georgia, United States	Disqualification		
1999-04-17	Win	(United States) James Dyson	IKF: Spring Showdown 1999	Augusta, Georgia, United States	TKO		
1999-02-06	Win	(United States) Scott Lee	IKF: Winter Wars 1999	Augusta, Georgia, United States	Decision (Unanimous)	3	2:00
Legend: Win Loss Draw/No contest Notes

== See also ==
- List of male mixed martial artists
