= Paperweight (film) =

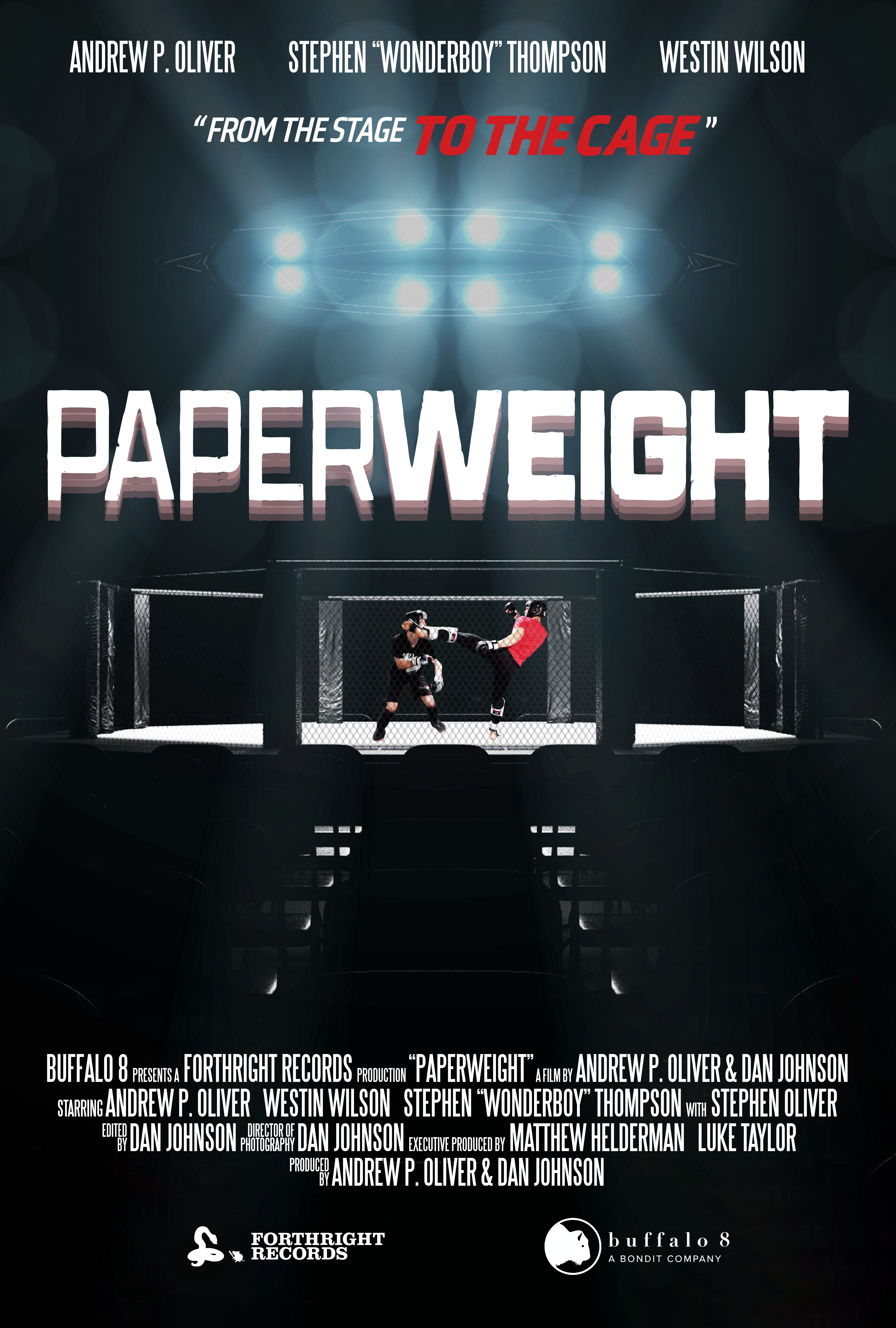
- Official movie poster
- Directed by: Andrew P. Oliver, Dan Johnson
- Produced by: Andrew P. Oliver
- Starring: Andrew P. Oliver, Westin Wilson, Stephen Thompson, Stephen J. Oliver, Joey Thompson, Dan Johnson
- Production company: Forthright Records
- Distributed by: Buffalo 8
- Release dates: March 30, 2025 (Reedy Reels); September 5, 2025
- Running time: 65 Minutes
- Country: United States
- Language: English

Paperweight is a 2025 American documentary film about a musician's journey into the world of MMA and the UFC. The film follows Andrew P. Oliver as he trains with UFC featherweight Westin Wilson to find out what it takes to be a professional fighter. It was directed by Andrew P. Oliver and Dan Johnson and executively produced by Matthew Helderman, Luke Taylor and Grady Craig.

== Summary ==
Paperweight details the real-time experience of recording artist Andrew P. Oliver as he is trained by UFC-newcomer Westin Wilson to experience the world of professional MMA from an outsider's perspective. The majority of the filming takes place at Ray Thompson's Upstate Karate in Simpsonville, SC, which is the home gym of Stephen "Wonderboy" Thompson. The film reaches its climax as Andrew P. Oliver squares off with Stephen "Wonderboy" Thompson in the octagon as his final test.

== Appearances ==
- Andrew P. Oliver
- Westin Wilson
- Stephen Thompson
- Stephen J. Oliver
- Dan Johnson
- Joey Thompson
- Josh Reynolds
- Blake Spence
- Jake Romano
- Matt Hannan

== Release ==
Paperweight was shown at the 2025 Reedy Reels Film Festival. It was released on September 5, 2025 on VOD via Buffalo 8.
