= Gregorio Di Leo =

Italian kickboxer

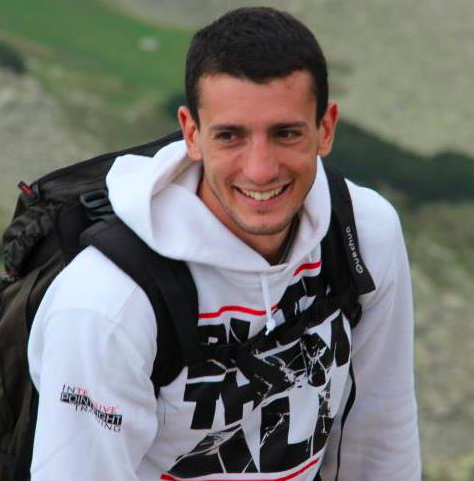
- Born: July 12, 1983 (age 43); Palermo, Italy
- Other names: Grillo
- Nationality: (Italy) Italian
- Style: Kickboxing

Other information
- Occupation: Entrepreneur, martial arts teacher, personal trainer and human resources consultant
- University: University of Padua, Master Degree in Organizational and Social Psychology
- Website: http://www.wyde.it/

Gregorio Di Leo (born July 12, 1983, in Palermo, Italy) is an entrepreneur, psychologist and professional Italian Kickboxing World Champion in Points Fighting. He is the co-founder of Wyde, a leadership school based in Milan, Italy.

== Early life and education ==
Di Leo was born on July 12, 1983, in Palermo, Italy. Di Leo holds a master's degree in Organizational and Social Psychology from the University of Padua, an executive program at Wharton Business School and Master in Sport Psychology. He is also a trained life coach from the Coaching Training Institute London.

== Professional Activity ==
Gregorio Di Leo's work in focused on improving people's lives inside and outside organizations. In 2011, he started focusing on the topic of courage, working to define the organizational conditions that foster courageous behavior and the personal meta-skills needed to do so.

From 2011 to 2017, he has served in various roles including, director of the faculty at ISTUD Foundation and Senior HR Consultant at Randstad.

In 2017, along with Jlenia Ermacora, Di Leo co-founded the Wyde leadership school, with the main goal being to design organizational development programs for companies and promote the concepts of the "Wyde Organization" (developed together with Giorgio Di Tullio).

He is a lecturer at the Tsinghua University in China and at LINK Community in Denmark.

== Semi-contact karate career ==
At the age of 11, Di Leo started his competitive karate career in Italy. From 1995 to 2011, he has competed in W.A.K.O (World Association of Kick Boxing Organizations) at the -69 kg weight division under the Semi-contact discipline:

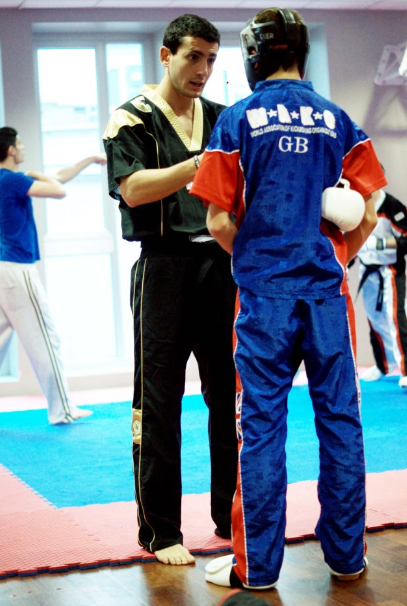

- four times World Champion
  - Paris, 2003
  - Szeged, 2005
  - Coimbra, 2007
  - Lignano, 2009
- two times European Champion
  - Maribor, 2004
  - Lisbon, 2006
- one time World Combat Games Champion
  - Beijing, 2010
- one time Wako Team World Champion
  - Dublin, 2011

Gregorio Di Leo has been one of the few European athletes capable of winning a team competition in the United States, together with Roberto Bellotti (Amerikick International, Atlantic City, 2005), and he is the only European athlete that has been able to win a race in Central America (Guatemala City, Great Maya Challenge, 2006).

Di Leo is part of the Aikya Team, established by Giampaolo Calajòi, who was himself a Kickboxing World Champion and member of Team Bestfighters, founded by Italian national coach Gianfranco Rizzi. Gregorio Di Leo is a psychologist, who graduated at the University of Padua in 2006. He is a martial arts teacher, personal trainer, and human resources consultant. During his career, he has run several seminars in Kickboxing throughout Italy, Bulgaria, South Korea, the United States, and Norway.

In 2010, Di Leo created the "Intensive Point Fight Training" method. The goal of the program is to promote a global approach to human sport performance in Kickboxing. In the same year, he took part in the inaugural SportAccord 2010 World Combat Games held in Beijing and won gold in the -74 kg category of Semi-contact Kickboxing.

Di Leo is vice-president of Aikya Team and an alumnus of Giampaolo Calajò.

== Titles ==
- 2012 W.A.K.O Irish Open (gold) -74 kg (Semi-Contact)
- 2011 W.A.K.O. World Championships in Dublin, Ireland (gold) Italian Team (Semi-Contact)
- 2011 Bristol Open Grand Champion (Semi-Contact)
- 2011 Italian Open (gold) -74 kg (Semi-Contact)
- 2011 W.A.K.O. World Cup, Rimini (gold) Italian Team (Semi-Contact)
- 2010 Sport Accord/W.A.K.O. Kickboxing at the World Combat Games in Beijing, China (gold) -74 kg (Semi-Contact)
- 2010 W.A.K.O. World Cup, Rimini (gold) Grandchampion (Semi-Contact)
- 2009 W.A.K.O. World Championships in Lignano Sabbiadoro, Italy (silver) Italian Team (Semi-Contact)
- 2009 W.A.K.O. World Championships in Lignano Sabbiadoro, Italy (gold) -74 kg (Semi-Contact)
- 2008 W.A.K.O. European Championships in Varna, Bulgaria (silver) -74 kg (Semi-Contact)
- 2007 W.A.K.O. World Championships in Coimbra, Portugal (gold) -69 kg (Semi-Contact)
- 2006 W.A.K.O. European Championships in Lisbon, Portugal (gold) -69 kg (Semi-Contact)
- 2006 Amerikick International Winner in Atlantic City, New Jersey, USA (gold) Italian Team (Semi-Contact)
- 2005 W.A.K.O. World Championships in Szeged, Hungary (gold) -69 kg (Semi-Contact)
- 2005 W.A.K.O. Golden Belt (gold) -69 kg (Semi-Contact)
- 2004 W.A.K.O. European Championships in Maribor, Slovenia (gold) -69 kg (Semi-Contact)
- 2004 W.A.K.O. Italian Open (gold) -69 kg (Semi-Contact)
- 2003 W.A.K.O. World Championships in Paris, France (gold) -69 kg (Semi-Contact)
- 2002 Irish Open in Dublin, Ireland (gold) -69 kg (Semi-Contact)
- x4 W.A.K.O. World Cup in Piacenza (gold) -69 kg (Semi-Contact)
- x3 W.A.K.O. World Cup in Piacenza (gold) Italian Team (Semi-Contact)
- x5 W.A.K.O Italian Champion (gold) -69 kg (Semi-Contact)
- W.A.K.O. European Professional Champion (gold) -69 kg (Semi-Contact)

== See also ==
- List of male kickboxers
