= Rivas (surname) =

Rivas is a surname of Spanish origin, likely derived from riba, an archaic term for the shore of a river. Notable people with the surname include:

== Government ==
- Cándido Muatetema Rivas (1960–2014), Equatorial Guinea politician
- Francisco Rivas Almada, Paraguayan politician
- Juan José González Rivas (born 1951), Spanish jurist and magistrate
- Luz Rivas (born 1974), American politician in California
- Martín Rivas Texeira (born 1969), Peruvian politician and lawyer
- Miguel Ángel Burelli Rivas (1922–2003), Venezuelan lawyer, diplomat and politician
- Olijela del Valle Rivas (1926–2024), Argentine politician
- Patricio Rivas, President of Nicaragua
- Robert A. Rivas (born 1980), American politician in California

== Sports ==
=== Boxing ===
- Adonis Rivas (born 1972), Nicaraguan boxer and former WBO Super Flyweight and Flyweight world champion
- Óscar Rivas (born 1987), Colombian boxer

=== Football (soccer) ===
- Antonio Rivas (Spanish footballer) (born 1965), Spanish football player and manager
- Avimiled Rivas (born 1984), Colombian footballer
- Daniel Rivas (born 2001), Paraguayan footballer
- David Rivas (born 1978), Spanish footballer
- Diego Rivas (footballer, born 1980), Spanish footballer
- Emanuel Rivas (born 1983), Argentine footballer
- Gelmin Rivas (born 1989), Venezuelan footballer
- Jesús Rivas (footballer) (born 2002), Mexican footballer
- Joaquín Rivas (born 1992), Salvadoran footballer
- José Alejandro Rivas (born 1998), Venezuelan footballer
- José Arturo Rivas (born 1984), Mexican footballer
- José María Rivas (1958–2016), Salvadorian footballer
- Martín Rivas (footballer, born 1977), Uruguayan footballer
- Nano Rivas (born 1980), Spanish football player and manager
- Nelson Rivas (born 1983), Colombian footballer
- Rigoberto Rivas (born 1998), Honduran footballer
- Sergio Rivas (born 1997), Mexican footballer
- Stalin Rivas (born 1971), Venezuelan footballer
- Ulíses Rivas (born 1996), Mexican footballer
- Willy Rivas (born 1985), Peruvian footballer

=== Other sports ===
- Alfonso Rivas (born 1996), Mexican-American baseball player
- Betsi Rivas (born 1986), Venezuelan weightlifter
- Claudia Rivas (born 1989), Mexican triathlete
- Diego Rivas (fighter) (born 1991), Chilean mixed martial arts fighter
- Garrett Rivas (born 1985), American football player
- Lázaro Rivas (1975–2013), Cuban wrestler
- Leo Rivas (born 1997), Venezuelan baseball player
- Llimy Rivas (born 1968), Colombian hurdler
- Pedro Rivas (basketball) (1945–2007), Panamanian basketball player
- Ramón Rivas (born 1966), Puerto Rican basketball player
- Thaimara Rivas (born 1982), Venezuelan heptathlete
- Vanessa Rivas (born 1996), Dominican swimmer
- Webster Rivas (born 1990), Dominican baseball player

== Other ==
- Antonieta Rivas Mercado (1900–1931), Mexican feminist and writer; daughter of Antonio
- Antonio Rivas Mercado (1853–1927), Mexican architect; father of Antonieta
- Carlos Rivas (disambiguation), multiple people
- Celeste Rivas Hernandez (2010–2025), American girl found dead in D4vd's car
- Diogenes Rivas (born 1942), Venezuelan composer
- Érica Rivas (born 1974), Argentine actress
- Eva Rivas (born 1987), Russian-Armenian singer
- Idubina Rivas (born 1994), Salvadorian beauty pageant winner
- Manuel Rivas (born 1957), Galician writer, poet and journalist
- Manuel Rivas, Spanish trade unionist
- María Rivas (actress) (1931–2013), Spanish actress

== See also ==
- Riva (surname)
- Rio (disambiguation)
- Ríos (disambiguation)
