= UFC Fight Night: Rodríguez vs. Penn =

UFC mixed martial arts event in 2017

- The poster for UFC Fight Night: Rodríguez vs. Penn
- Promotion: Ultimate Fighting Championship
- Date: January 15, 2017
- Venue: Talking Stick Resort Arena
- City: Phoenix, Arizona
- Attendance: 11,589
- Total gate: $913,372.75

Event chronology
UFC 207: Nunes vs. Rousey	UFC Fight Night: Rodríguez vs. Penn	UFC on Fox: Shevchenko vs. Peña

UFC Fight Night: Rodríguez vs. Penn (also known as UFC Fight Night 103) was a mixed martial arts event produced by the Ultimate Fighting Championship held on January 15, 2017, at Talking Stick Resort Arena in Phoenix, Arizona

== Background ==
This was the second event the organization hosted in Phoenix.

A featherweight bout between The Ultimate Fighter: Latin America featherweight winner Yair Rodríguez and former UFC Lightweight and Welterweight Champion B.J. Penn served as the event headliner. This was Penn's first fight in the organization in over two-and-a-half years.

Erik Koch was expected to face Anthony Rocco Martin at the event. However, Koch pulled out of the fight on December 12 citing injury and was replaced by Alex White.

Damian Grabowski was expected to face Viktor Pešta at the event. However, Grabowski was removed from the bout on December 21 for undisclosed reasons and was replaced by Alexey Oleynik.

On December 29, two bouts suffered alterations: Jussier Formiga pulled out from his bout against Sergio Pettis and Jordan Rinaldi from his bout against Devin Powell. They were replaced by former UFC Flyweight Championship challenger John Moraga and promotional newcomer Drakkar Klose, respectively.

Bryan Caraway was expected to face Jimmie Rivera at the event. However, Caraway pulled out of the bout on January 4 citing an undisclosed injury. He was replaced by Marlon Vera. Eventually, Rivera pulled from the fight as he felt going from a top-5 ranked fighter to an unranked one wouldn't make sense at that moment.

== Results ==
Main Card (Fox Sports 1)
Weight class				Method	Round	Time	Notes
Featherweight	Yair Rodríguez	def.	B.J. Penn	TKO (front kick and punches)	2	0:24
Lightweight	Joe Lauzon	def.	Marcin Held	Decision (split) (27–30, 29–28, 29–28)	3	5:00
Welterweight	Ben Saunders	def.	Court McGee	Decision (unanimous) (29–28, 29–28, 29–28)	3	5:00
Flyweight	Sergio Pettis	def.	John Moraga	Decision (unanimous) (29–28, 29–28, 30–27)	3	5:00
Preliminary Card (Fox Sports 1)
Lightweight	Drakkar Klose	def.	Devin Powell	Decision (unanimous) (30–27, 30–27, 30–27)	3	5:00
Bantamweight	Augusto Mendes	def.	Frankie Saenz	Decision (split) (28–29, 29–28, 29–28)	3	5:00
Heavyweight	Alexey Oleynik	def.	Viktor Pešta	Submission (Ezekiel choke)	1	2:57
Lightweight	Anthony Rocco Martin	def.	Alex White	Decision (unanimous) (30–27, 30–27, 30–27)	3	5:00
Preliminary Card (UFC Fight Pass)
Women's Strawweight	Nina Ansaroff	def.	Jocelyn Jones-Lybarger	Submission (rear-naked choke)	3	3:39
Heavyweight	Walt Harris	def.	Chase Sherman	KO (knee and punches)	2	2:41
Light Heavyweight	Joachim Christensen	def.	Bojan Mihajlović	TKO (punches)	3	2:05
Heavyweight	Cyril Asker	def.	Dmitry Smolyakov	TKO (punches and elbows)	1	2:41

== Bonus awards ==
The following fighters were awarded $50,000 bonuses:

- Fight of the Night: Augusto Mendes vs. Frankie Saenz
- Performance of the Night: Yair Rodríguez and Oleksiy Oliynyk

== Reported payout ==
The following is the reported payout to the fighters as reported to the Arizona Boxing & Mixed Martial Arts Commission. It does not include sponsor money and also does not include the UFC's traditional "fight night" bonuses. The total disclosed payout for the event was $841,000.

- Yair Rodríguez: $100,000 (includes $50,000 win bonus) def. B.J. Penn: $150,000
- Joe Lauzon: $116,000 (includes $58,000 win bonus) def. Marcin Held: $20,000
- Ben Saunders: $40,000 (includes $20,000 win bonus) def. Court McGee: $35,000
- Sergio Pettis: $54,000 (includes $27,000 win bonus) def. John Moraga: $28,000
- Drakkar Klose: $20,000 (includes $10,000 win bonus) def. Devin Powell: $10,000
- Augusto Mendes: $20,000 (includes $10,000 win bonus) def. Frankie Saenz: $20,000
- Oleksiy Oliynyk: $48,000 (includes $24,000 win bonus) def. Viktor Pešta: $10,000
- Tony Martin: $32,000 (includes $16,000 win bonus) def. Alex White: $14,000
- Nina Ansaroff: $20,000 (includes $10,000 win bonus) def. Jocelyn Jones-Lybarger: $10,000
- Walt Harris: $24,000 (includes $12,000 win bonus) def. Chase Sherman: $10,000
- Joachim Christensen: $20,000 (includes $10,000 win bonus) def. Bojan Mihajlović: $10,000
- Cyril Asker: $20,000 (includes $10,000 win bonus) def. Dmitrii Smoliakov: $10,000

== See also ==
- List of UFC events
- 2017 in UFC
