= Francisco Rivas =

Francisco Rivas may refer to:

- Francisco Rivas Almada (fl. 2010s), Paraguayan politician
- Francisco Rivas Lara (fl. 2010s), Guatemalan politician, minister of the interior in the cabinet of Jimmy Morales
- Francisco Rivas Vicuña (fl. 1900s), Chilean politician
