= Frankie Saenz =

American mixed martial artist

- Born: Frankie Ozuna Saenz III; August 12, 1980 (age 46); Phoenix, Arizona, United States
- Height: 5 ft 6 in (168 cm)
- Weight: 135 lb (61 kg; 9 st 9 lb)
- Division: Bantamweight; Featherweight
- Reach: 66 in (168 cm)
- Fighting out of: Scottsdale, Arizona, United States
- Team: The Lion's Den / Fight Ready MMA (2008–present)
- Rank: Blue belt in Brazilian Jiu-Jitsu
- Wrestling: NCAA Division I Wrestling
- Years active: 2009–2020

Mixed martial arts record
- Total: 19
- Wins: 12
- By knockout: 3
- By submission: 2
- By decision: 7
- Losses: 7
- By knockout: 4
- By decision: 2
- By disqualification: 1

Other information
- University: Arizona State; University of Northern Colorado
- Mixed martial arts record from Sherdog
- Last updated on: February 25, 2015

Frankie Ozuna Saenz III (born August 12, 1980) is an American mixed martial artist who competed in the bantamweight division. A professional since 2009, he made a name for himself fighting mostly in his native state, where he was King of the Cage Flyweight Champion (135 lb), World Fighting Federation Featherweight Champion and Coalition of Combat Featherweight Champion and for his time in the Ultimate Fighting Championship.

== Background ==
The son of Frank and Debbie Saenz, Frankie is of Mexican descent. Frankie had four younger sisters, of whom one committed suicide in her teens. Frankie grew up in Maryvale, Phoenix playing football from the age of seven onward, picking up wrestling at his wrestling coach father's behest in the middle school. Frankie attended Marcos de Niza High School where he was undefeated state champion wrestler in 1998 and 1999 at 133-pound division receiving All American honors in his senior year. He lettered all four of his high school years in wrestling along with two letterman years in football.

Graduating from high school in 1999 Frankie was about to attend University of Oklahoma, but due to the sister's recent suicide he wasn't ready to leave home state and was recruited to Arizona State. He went on to wrestle two years at Arizona State without much accolades and ended up transferring to University of Northern Colorado. At the time UNC had just transferred from Division II to Division I in wrestling, and after a year of wrestling the college was placed on probation which effectively ended Frankie's collegiate wrestling career. Subsequently, Frankie returned to Arizona and started coaching wrestling at Maryvale high school before beginning to train mixed martial arts in 2008.

== Mixed martial arts career ==
He won WFF Featherweight championship in 2011 at WFF 7, with a TKO win over Michael Parker. Later in the next year, he lost his belt via disqualification to Jeff Fletcher due to an illegal knee to head of grounded opponent.

=== King of the Cage ===
After winning the Coalition of Combat Championship in 2012, Saenz signed a four-fight contract with King of the Cage with a clause sign with the UFC after two fights. In his promotional debut, Saenz won KOTC Flyweight (135 lbs) championship, with a submission win over Marvin Garcia. He made his first successful title defense against Tyler Bialecki at KOTC: Boiling Point on September 28, 2013. After the fight, World Series of Fighting tried to sign Saenz, but King of the Cage did not release him because the clause in his contract applied only UFC. Saenz then defended his title for the second time against Marvin Blumer at KOTC: Radar Lock on February 22, 2014.

=== Ultimate Fighting Championship ===
After his second title defense on KOTC, Saenz signed with the UFC on August 7, 2014. He was scheduled to make his promotional debut on short notice against another newcomer, Nolan Ticman on August 16, 2014, at UFC Fight Night 47. Saenz won the fight via unanimous decision.

Saenz later was scheduled to face Aljamain Sterling on November 8, 2014, at UFC Fight Night 55, but the fight was scrapped due to Saenz being injured.

On February 22, 2015, Saenz fought Iuri Alcântara at UFC Fight Night 61. As a 7-1 underdog, Saenz defeated the #8 ranked Alcântara via unanimous decision.

Saenz faced Sirwan Kakai on August 8, 2015, at UFC Fight Night 73. He won the fight by split decision.

Saenz next faced Urijah Faber on December 12, 2015, at UFC 194. He lost the back-and-forth fight by unanimous decision.

Saenz faced Eddie Wineland on July 23, 2016, at UFC on Fox 20. He lost the fight via TKO at the 1:54 mark of the third round.

Saenz next faced Augusto Mendes on January 15, 2017, at UFC Fight Night 103. He lost the fight by split decision. Both participants were awarded Fight of the Night for their performance.

Saenz faced promotional newcomer Merab Dvalishvili at UFC Fight Night: Swanson vs. Ortega on December 9, 2017. He won the fight by split decision. 10 out of 13 media outlets scored the bout for Dvalishvili.

Saenz faced Henry Briones on May 19, 2018, at UFC Fight Night 129. He won the fight by unanimous decision.

Saenz was expected to face Song Yadong on November 23, 2018, at UFC Fight Night 141. However, it was reported on November 7, 2018, that he pulled out of the event due to injury and he was replaced by newcomer Vince Morales.

Saenz was scheduled to face Marlon Vera on March 2, 2019, at UFC 235. However, Vera pulled out of the fight on February 27 due to illness and the bout was scrapped from the event. The bout was rescheduled to UFC Fight Night 148. Saenz lost the fight via technical knockout in round one.

Saenz faced Jonathan Martinez on August 1, 2020, at UFC Fight Night: Brunson vs. Shahbazyan. At the weigh-ins, Martinez weighed in at 140.5 pounds, four and a half pounds over the bantamweight non-title fight limit. His bout proceeded at a catchweight and he was fined 30 percent of his purse, which went to Saenz. He lost this fight via TKO in the third round.

== Personal life ==
Saenz and his fiancé Lena have a daughter and a son.

== Championships and accomplishments ==
- King of the Cage
  - KOTC Flyweight Championship (One time)
- Two successful title defenses
- World Fighting Federation
  - WFF Featherweight Championship (One time)
- Coalition of Combat
  - COC Featherweight Championship (One time)
- Ultimate Fighting Championship
  - Fight of the Night (One time)

== Mixed martial arts record ==
Professional record breakdown
19 matches	12 wins	7 losses
By knockout	3	4
By submission	2	0
By decision	7	2
By disqualification	0	1

Res.	Record	Opponent	Method	Event	Date	Round	Time	Location	Notes
Loss	12–7	Jonathan Martinez	TKO (knee and punches)	UFC Fight Night: Brunson vs. Shahbazyan	August 1, 2020	3	0:57	Las Vegas, Nevada, United States	Catchweight (140.5 lb) bout; Martinez missed weight.
Loss	12–6	Marlon Vera	TKO (punches)	UFC Fight Night: Thompson vs. Pettis	March 23, 2019	1	1:25	Nashville, Tennessee, United States	
Win	12–5	Henry Briones	Decision (unanimous)	UFC Fight Night: Maia vs. Usman	May 19, 2018	3	5:00	Santiago, Chile	
Win	11–5	Merab Dvalishvili	Decision (split)	UFC Fight Night: Swanson vs. Ortega	December 9, 2017	3	5:00	Fresno, California, United States	
Loss	10–5	Augusto Mendes	Decision (split)	UFC Fight Night: Rodríguez vs. Penn	January 15, 2017	3	5:00	Phoenix, Arizona, United States	Fight of the Night.
Loss	10–4	Eddie Wineland	TKO (punches)	UFC on Fox: Holm vs. Shevchenko	July 23, 2016	3	1:54	Chicago, Illinois, United States	
Loss	10–3	Urijah Faber	Decision (unanimous)	UFC 194	December 12, 2015	3	5:00	Las Vegas, Nevada, United States	
Win	10–2	Sirwan Kakai	Decision (split)	UFC Fight Night: Teixeira vs. Saint Preux	August 8, 2015	3	5:00	Nashville, Tennessee, United States	
Win	9–2	Iuri Alcântara	Decision (unanimous)	UFC Fight Night: Bigfoot vs. Mir	February 22, 2015	3	5:00	Porto Alegre, Brazil	
Win	8–2	Nolan Ticman	Decision (unanimous)	UFC Fight Night: Bader vs. St. Preux	August 16, 2014	3	5:00	Bangor, Maine, United States	
Win	7–2	Marvin Blumer	TKO (doctor stoppage)	KOTC: Radar Lock	February 22, 2014	4	5:00	Scottsdale, Arizona, United States	Defended the KOTC Flyweight Championship.
Win	6–2	Tyler Bialecki	Submission (rear-naked choke)	KOTC: Boiling Point	September 28, 2013	1	4:53	Scottsdale, Arizona, United States	Defended the KOTC Flyweight Championship.
Win	5–2	Marvin Garcia	Submission (rear-naked choke)	KOTC: World Champions	May 25, 2013	2	4:10	Las Vegas, Nevada, United States	Bantamweight debut. Won the KOTC Flyweight Championship.
Win	4–2	Jade Porter	Decision (majority)	Coalition of Combat: Pound for Pound	September 15, 2012	3	5:00	Phoenix, Arizona, United States	Won the Coalition of Combat Featherweight Championship.
Loss	3–2	Jeff Fletcher	DQ (illegal knee)	World Fighting Federation 8	May 12, 2012	1	4:12	Scottsdale, Arizona, United States	Lost the WFF Featherweight Championship.
Loss	3–1	Cody Huard	KO (punch)	TCF: Rumble at Ranch 2	November 5, 2011	1	2:34	Phoenix, Arizona, United States	
Win	3–0	Michael Parker	TKO (punches)	World Fighting Federation 7	October 22, 2011	1	3:08	Tucson, Arizona, United States	Won the WFF Featherweight Championship.
Win	2–0	Ruben Gonzales	Decision (unanimous)	TCF: Rumble at Ranch 1	April 23, 2011	3	5:00	Phoenix, Arizona, United States	
Win	1–0	Kenneth Mendoza	TKO (punches)	World Fighting Federarion 1	October 16, 2010	1	4:26	Tucson, Arizona, United States	

== See also ==
- List of male mixed martial artists
