= UFC Fight Night: Shogun vs. Saint Preux =

UFC mixed martial arts event in 2014

- The poster for UFC Fight Night: Shogun vs. Saint Preux
- Promotion: Ultimate Fighting Championship
- Date: November 8, 2014
- Venue: Ginásio Municipal Tancredo Neves
- City: Uberlândia, Brazil
- Attendance: 5,671

Event chronology
UFC Fight Night: Rockhold vs. Bisping	UFC Fight Night: Shogun vs. Saint Preux	UFC 180: Werdum vs. Hunt

UFC Fight Night: Shogun vs. Saint Preux (also known as UFC Fight Night 56) was a mixed martial arts event held at the Ginásio Municipal Tancredo Neves in Uberlândia, Brazil, on November 8, 2014.

== Background ==
After previously holding events in Minas Gerais's largest city Belo Horizonte, the event was the first that the organization has hosted in Uberlândia.

A light heavyweight bout between Maurício Rua and Jimi Manuwa was expected to serve as event headliner. However, on October 29, it was announced that Manuwa had pulled out of the fight due to injury and Ovince Saint Preux replaced him in main event against Rua.

Rafael Cavalcante was expected to face Ovince Saint Preux at the event. However, Cavalcante pulled out of the bout citing injury and was replaced by Francimar Barroso. Subsequently, this fight was cancelled when Saint Preux was chosen as an injury replacement in the event headliner.

Dhiego Lima was originally scheduled to face Pawel Pawlak at this event. However, Pawlak was forced to pull out of the fight due to injury and was replaced by promotional newcomer Jorge de Oliveira.

A bout between Ian McCall and John Lineker was expected to be the co-main event. However, just hours after both fighters successfully made weight, it was announced that McCall had to pull out of the fight due to a viral infection and the bout was pulled from the event entirely. The bout between Dhiego Lima and Jorge de Oliveira was moved to the main card.

== Results ==
Main Card (Fox Sports 1)
Weight class				Method	Round	Time	Notes
Light Heavyweight	Ovince Saint Preux	def.	Maurício Rua	KO (punches)	1	0:34
Welterweight	Warlley Alves	def.	Alan Jouban	Decision (unanimous) (29–28, 29–28, 29–28)	3	5:00
Welterweight	Cláudio Silva	def.	Leon Edwards	Decision (split) (28–29, 29–28, 29–28)	3	5:00
Welterweight	Dhiego Lima	def.	Jorge de Oliveira	Decision (unanimous) (30–27, 30–27, 30–27)	3	5:00
Women's Strawweight	Juliana Lima	def.	Nina Ansaroff	Decision (unanimous) (29–28, 29–28, 29–28)	3	5:00
Preliminary card (Fox Sports 2)
Featherweight	Diego Rivas	def.	Rodolfo Rubio	Decision (unanimous) (30–27, 30–27, 30–27)	3	5:00
Middleweight	Caio Magalhães	def.	Trevor Smith	KO (knee and punches)	1	0:31
Lightweight	Leandro Silva	def.	Charlie Brenneman	Submission (rear-naked choke)	1	4:15
Bantamweight	Thomas Almeida	def.	Tim Gorman	Decision (unanimous) (30–27, 30–27, 29–28)	3	5:00
Preliminary card (UFC Fight Pass)
Welterweight	Colby Covington	def.	Wagner Silva	Submission (rear-naked choke)	3	3:26

== Bonus awards ==
The following fighters received $50,000 bonuses:

- Fight of the Night: Thomas Almeida vs. Tim Gorman
- Performance of the Night: Ovince Saint Preux and Leandro Silva

== See also ==
- List of UFC events
- 2014 in UFC
