= Guido Cannetti =

Argentine mixed martial artist

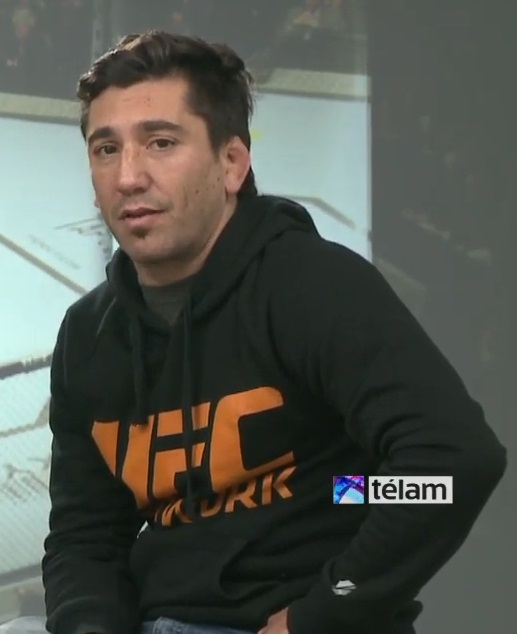
- Cannetti in 2014
- Born: Guido Martín Cannetti Álvarez; 19 December 1979 (age 46); Mar del Plata, Buenos Aires, Argentina
- Other names: El Ninja
- Height: 5 ft 6 in (1.68 m)
- Weight: 135 lb (61 kg)
- Division: Bantamweight (2013–present); Featherweight (2007–2010, 2012–2013); Lightweight (2010–2012)
- Reach: 68 in (173 cm)
- Style: Muay Thai
- Fighting out of: San Antonio de Padua, Buenos Aires, Argentina
- Team: Academia Goa (formerly); Our Town MMA (2013–present); Team Alpha Male (2015–present)
- Years active: 2007–present

Mixed martial arts record
- Total: 18
- Wins: 10
- By knockout: 4
- By submission: 4
- By decision: 2
- Losses: 8
- By knockout: 1
- By submission: 6
- By decision: 1

Other information
- Mixed martial arts record from Sherdog

Guido Martín Cannetti Álvarez (born 19 December 1979) is an Argentine mixed martial artist who competed in the Bantamweight division. He is most notable for his stint in the Ultimate Fighting Championship.

== Background ==
Growing up, Guido practised kickboxing and Muay Thai with his brother Bruno, who is also a professional mixed martial artist.

== Mixed martial arts career ==
Guido Cannetti became a professional mixed martial arts fighter in 2007. He won his MMA debut fight by submitting Santiago Terbalca in a Featherweight bout. On his second fight, he defeated Enrique Chimeyo to remain unbeaten. For his next fight, Cannetti moved up to Lightweight division in order to face Cristiano Marcello at the Bitetti Combat 8 event in Brazil. He lost the fight via first-round submission.

Cannetti returned from his loss and entered in a four-fight winning streak by defeating Benjamín Arroyo. He was expected to face up David "Escorpión" Ibérico in a Conviction MMA event to be held in Argentina. On 7 July 2012, the promotion announced that Ibérico withdrew from the fight after suffering a shoulder injury. Cannetti instead faced Jack Guzmán in a bout that marked his return to Featherweight division. He won the fight via first-round knockout. Then he defeated Bellator MMA and WEC veteran Rafael Dias in just 11 seconds in a fight that marked his return to Brazil.

Subsequently, Cannetti tried out for UFC's Latin America developmental program and was accepted into it. As a result, Cannetti moved down to Bantamweight division and begun training at the Jackson's MMA academy at UFC's expense. While in Albuquerque, he defeated Eliazar Rodriguez in a bout that closed his four-fight winning streak before trying out for The Ultimate Fighter in 2014.

=== The Ultimate Fighter: Latin America ===
In May 2014, it was revealed that Cannetti was a cast member of The Ultimate Fighter: Latin America, competing for Team Werdum.

Over the course of the show, Cannetti was defeated in the first round of tournament by Marco Beltrán via majority decision after two rounds. Ecuadorian fighter and Team Werdum teammate Marlon Vera was withdrew the tournament after a skin infection and was replaced by Guido Cannetti. Cannetti was defeated by Alejandro Pérez in semi-finals of tournament via first-round knockout.

=== Ultimate Fighting Championship ===
Cannetti made his official UFC debut on 15 November 2014, at UFC 180, facing fellow The Ultimate Fighter: Latin America castmate Henry Briones. After being knocked down, he lost the fight via second-round submission. Despite the losing effort, he earned a Fight of the Night bonus.

Cannetti next faced Hugo Viana on 1 August 2015, at UFC 190. He won the fight by unanimous decision.

Cannetti was expected to face former TUF: Latin America opponent Marco Beltrán on 5 November 2016, at The Ultimate Fighter Latin America 3 Finale. However, he was pulled from the card after he was suspended by USADA and was replaced by Joe Soto.

Cannetti was given a 10-month suspension after testing positive for multiple prohibited substances from a contaminated supplement. Cannetti tested positive for ostarine, the stanozolol metabolites 16β-hydroxystanozolol and 4β-hydroxystanozolol, as well as hydrochlorothiazide and chlorothiazide, following an out-of-competition test conducted on 5 October 2016.

Cannetti faced Kang Kyung-ho on 14 January 2018, at UFC Fight Night: Stephens vs. Choi. He lost the fight via submission in round one.

Cannetti faced Diego Rivas on 19 May 2018, at UFC Fight Night 129. He won the fight by unanimous decision.

Cannetti faced Marlon Vera on 17 November 2018, at UFC Fight Night 140. After being knocked down, he lost the fight via a rear-naked choke submission in round two.

Cannetti faced Danaa Batgerel on 7 March 2020, at UFC 248. He lost the fight via knockout in the first round.

Cannetti was scheduled to face Mario Bautista on 28 August 2021, at UFC on ESPN 30. However, Bautista tested positive for COVID-19 and was pulled from the card, and he was replaced by Mana Martinez. At the weigh-ins, Martinez weighed in at 140 pounds, four pounds over the bantamweight non-title fight limit. The bout proceeded at a catchweight and he forfeited 30% of his purse to Cannetti. Cannetti lost the fight via split decision.

Cannetti faced Kris Moutinho on 12 March 2022, at UFC Fight Night 203. He won the fight via technical knockout in round one.

Cannetti faced Randy Costa on 1 October 2022, at UFC Fight Night 211. He submitted Costa via rear-naked choke in the first round. This win earned him the Performance of the Night award.

The match between Bautista and Mario Bautista was rescheduled for UFC Fight Night 221 on 11 March 2023. He lost the fight via a rear-naked choke submission in the first round.

After his loss, it was announced that Cannetti was no longer on the UFC roster.

== Bare-knuckle boxing ==
Cannetti made his debut with Bare Knuckle Fighting Championship against Emiliano Nielli on 25 July 2026 at BKFC Fight Night 42. He won the fight by unanimous decision.

== Personal life ==
Cannetti and his wife Carolina have two sons.

Guido and his brother Bruno co-own and teach at their mixed martial arts gym Our Town MMA in Lanús, Argentina.

Guido idolized Argentine footballer Diego Maradona and said that he mourned and cried after Maradona died in November 2020.

== Championships and accomplishments ==
- Ultimate Fighting Championship
  - Fight of the Night (One time) vs. Henry Briones
  - Performance of the Night (One time) vs. Randy Costa

== Mixed martial arts record ==
Professional record breakdown
18 matches	10 wins	8 losses
By knockout	4	1
By submission	4	6
By decision	2	1

Res.	Record	Opponent	Method	Event	Date	Round	Time	Location	Notes
Loss	10–8	Marcel Adur	Submission (armbar)	Fusion FC 84	13 November 2024	2	2:13	Buenos Aires, Argentina	
Loss	10–7	Mario Bautista	Submission (rear-naked choke)	UFC Fight Night: Yan vs. Dvalishvili	11 March 2023	1	3:18	Las Vegas, Nevada, United States	
Win	10–6	Randy Costa	Submission (rear-naked choke)	UFC Fight Night: Dern vs. Yan	1 October 2022	1	1:04	Las Vegas, Nevada, United States	Performance of the Night.
Win	9–6	Kris Moutinho	TKO (punches)	UFC Fight Night: Santos vs. Ankalaev	12 March 2022	1	2:07	Las Vegas, Nevada, United States	
Loss	8–6	Leomana Martinez	Decision (split)	UFC on ESPN: Barboza vs. Chikadze	28 August 2021	3	5:00	Las Vegas, Nevada, United States	Catchweight (140 lb) bout; Martinez missed weight.
Loss	8–5	Danaa Batgerel	KO (punches)	UFC 248	7 March 2020	1	3:01	Las Vegas, Nevada, United States	
Loss	8–4	Marlon Vera	Submission (rear-naked choke)	UFC Fight Night: Magny vs. Ponzinibbio	17 November 2018	2	1:31	Buenos Aires, Argentina	
Win	8–3	Diego Rivas	Decision (unanimous)	UFC Fight Night: Maia vs. Usman	19 May 2018	3	5:00	Santiago, Chile	
Loss	7–3	Kang Kyung-ho	Submission (triangle choke)	UFC Fight Night: Stephens vs. Choi	14 January 2018	1	4:53	St. Louis, Missouri, United States	
Win	7–2	Hugo Viana	Decision (unanimous)	UFC 190	1 August 2015	3	5:00	Rio de Janeiro, Brazil	
Loss	6–2	Henry Briones	Submission (rear-naked choke)	UFC 180	15 November 2014	2	1:44	Mexico City, Mexico	Fight of the Night.
Win	6–1	Eliazar Rodriguez	Submission (rear-naked choke)	Jackson's MMA Series 11	10 August 2013	1	4:29	Albuquerque, New Mexico, United States	Return to Bantamweight.
Win	5–1	Rafael Dias	KO (punches)	Bitetti Combat 12	8 September 2012	1	0:11	Rio de Janeiro, Brazil	Featherweight debut.
Win	4–1	Jack Guzman	TKO (punches)	Conviction MMA 3	14 July 2012	1	2:46	Buenos Aires, Argentina	
Win	3–1	Benjamin Arroyo	Submission (rear-naked choke)	Contest MMA: Argentina vs. Chile	9 April 2011	1	1:49	Buenos Aires, Argentina	
Loss	2–1	Cristiano Marcello	Submission (rear-naked choke)	Bitetti Combat 8	4 December 2010	1	1:52	São Paulo, Brazil	
Win	2–0	Enrique Chimeyo	TKO (punches)	Sin Piedad: Argentina vs. México	20 August 2009	1	3:30	Buenos Aires, Argentina	
Win	1–0	Santiago Terbalca	Submission (rear-naked choke)	Real Fights 3	22 December 2007	1	0:00	Buenos Aires, Argentina	Bantamweight debut.

== Bare-knuckle boxing record ==
Professional record breakdown
1 match	1 win	0 losses
By decision	1	0

Res.	Record	Opponent	Method	Event	Date	Round	Time	Location	Notes
Win	1–0	Emiliano Nielli	Decision (unanimous)	BKFC Fight Night Uruguay: Reyno vs. Krejci	25 July 2026	5	2:00	Montevideo, Uruguay	
