= Gabriel Benítez =

Mexican mixed martial artist

- Born: 15 June 1988 (age 38); Tijuana, Baja California, Mexico
- Other names: Moggly
- Height: 5 ft 8 in (1.73 m)
- Weight: 70 kg (154 lb; 11 st 0 lb)
- Division: Featherweight; Lightweight
- Reach: 71 in (180 cm)
- Fighting out of: Tijuana, Baja California, Mexico
- Team: American Kickboxing Academy
- Years active: 2007–present

Mixed martial arts record
- Total: 35
- Wins: 23
- By knockout: 9
- By submission: 10
- By decision: 4
- Losses: 12
- By knockout: 4
- By submission: 3
- By decision: 5

Other information
- Mixed martial arts record from Sherdog

Gabriel Benítez (born June 15, 1988) is a Mexican mixed martial artist. He was a contestant on The Ultimate Fighter: Latin America 1, and competed in the Featherweight and Lightweight divisions of the Ultimate Fighting Championship (UFC). Early in his fighting career, he was a champion in Ultimate Warrior Challenge Mexico.

== Background ==
Benítez was born in Tijuana, Mexico and started training in mixed martial arts when he was 18 years old.

== Mixed martial arts career ==
=== Early career ===
Benítez started his professional MMA career in 2007, making his debut in his home country Mexico (including several fights in UWC) and he amassed a record of 16–4 prior to signing with the UFC.

=== The Ultimate Fighter: Latin America 1 ===
Benítez was selected as one of the cast members for The Ultimate Fighter: Latin America 1, UFC The Ultimate Fighter TV series, under Team Cain Velasquez in April 2014.

In elimination round, Benítez submitted Diego Rivas via rear-naked choke in round 2. Benítez next faced Leonardo Morales in the semifinals and he lost by unanimous decision.

=== Ultimate Fighting Championship ===
Benítez made his promotional debut on November 15, 2014, at UFC 180 against Humberto Brown. He won the first UFC win via guillotine choke in round 3.

He next faced Clay Collard on June 13, 2015, at UFC 188. He won via unanimous decision with 30-27 across the board.

On his third appearance for UFC fight, Benítez took on Andre Fili on November 21, 2015, at UFC Fight Night: Magny vs. Gastelum. He lost the fight via KO in round one.

On September 17, 2016, Benítez face Sam Sicilia at UFC Fight Night: Poirier vs. Johnson. He defeated Sicilia via guillotine choke in round two.

Benítez faced Enrique Barzola, the featherweight champion of “The Ultimate Fighter: Latin America 2, on May 13, 2017, at UFC 211. After three rounds fight, the judges awarded the win to Barzola with 29-28 across the score board.

Benítez faced Jason Knight on December 9, 2017, at UFC Fight Night 123. He won the fight via unanimous decision.

Benítez faced Humberto Bandenay on May 19, 2018, at UFC Fight Night 129. He won the fight via knockout due to a slam and punches just 39 seconds into the first round. This win earned him the Performance of the Night bonus.

Benítez faced Sodiq Yusuff on August 17, 2019, at UFC 241. He lost the fight via knockout in round one.

Benítez was expected to face Lerone Murphy on March 21, 2020, at UFC Fight Night: Woodley vs. Edwards. Due to the COVID-19 pandemic, the event was eventually postponed.

Benítez faced Omar Morales on May 13, 2020, at UFC Fight Night: Smith vs. Teixeira. He lost the fight via unanimous decision, in a bout that caused a stir due to a shin injury sustained by Benítez.

Benítez was scheduled to face Justin Jaynes on November 14, 2020, at UFC Fight Night: Felder vs. dos Anjos. The fight was canceled after Benítez tested positive for COVID-19. The pairing was left intact and eventually took place on December 5, 2020, at UFC on ESPN 19. He won the fight via technical knockout in the first round. This fight earned him the Performance of the Night award.

Benítez was scheduled to face Jonathan Pearce on May 1, 2021, at UFC on ESPN 23. However, weighing in over 4 pounds during weigh-in, the bout was cancelled.

Benítez faced Billy Quarantillo, replacing Herbert Burns on July 17, 2021, at UFC on ESPN 26. He lost the fight via technical knockout in round three. This win earned him the Fight of the Night award.

Benítez was scheduled to face T.J. Brown on January 15, 2022, at UFC on ESPN 32. Three days before the event, Benítez was forced to pull out and Charles Rosa replaced him with the bout now taking place at Lightweight.

Benítez faced David Onama on February 19, 2022, at UFC Fight Night: Walker vs. Hill. At weigh-ins, Benítez weighed in at 148 pounds, 2 pounds over the featherweight non-title fight limit. The bout proceeded at catchweight and he was fined 30% of his purse. Benítez lost the bout via first-round knockout.

Benítez faced Charlie Ontiveros on August 13, 2022, at UFC on ESPN 41. He won the fight via technical knockout in round one.

Benítez was scheduled to face Jim Miller on February 18, 2023, at UFC Fight Night 219. However, Benítez withdrew due to an undisclosed reason and was replaced by Alexander Hernandez.

Benítez faced Jim Miller on January 13, 2024, at UFC Fight Night 234. He lost by face crank submission in the third round.

Benítez faced Maheshate Hayisaer, replacing Anshul Jubli on April 27, 2024, at UFC on ESPN 55. He lost the fight by split decision.

On December 13, 2024, it was reported that Benítez was removed from the UFC roster, which brings to an end a 10-year stay in the promotion.

== Championships and accomplishments ==
- Ultimate Fighting Championship
  - Performance of the Night (Two times) vs. Humberto Bandenay and Justin Jaynes
  - Fight of the Night (One time) vs. Billy Quarantillo
  - UFC.com Awards
    - 2017: Ranked No. 6 Upset of the Year vs. Jason Knight
- Ultimate Warrior Challenge Mexico
  - UWC Featherweight Champion (One time)
- Xtreme Kombat
  - Xtreme Kombat Featherweight Champion (One time) vs. Antonio Ramirez
- Xtreme Fighters Latino
  - Xtreme Fighters Latino Featherweight Champion (One time) vs. Daniel Salas
- Xplode Fight Series
  - Xplode Fight Series Featherweight Champion (One time) vs. Ryan Bixler

== Mixed martial arts record ==
Professional record breakdown
35 matches	23 wins	12 losses
By knockout	9	4
By submission	10	3
By decision	4	5

Res.	Record	Opponent	Method	Event	Date	Round	Time	Location	Notes
Loss	23–12	Maheshate Hayisaer	Decision (split)	UFC on ESPN: Nicolau vs. Perez	April 27, 2024	3	5:00	Las Vegas, Nevada, United States	
Loss	23–11	Jim Miller	Submission (face crank)	UFC Fight Night: Ankalaev vs. Walker 2	January 13, 2024	3	3:25	Las Vegas, Nevada, United States	
Win	23–10	Charlie Ontiveros	TKO (punches)	UFC on ESPN: Vera vs. Cruz	August 13, 2022	1	3:35	San Diego, California, United States	Return to Lightweight.
Loss	22–10	David Onama	KO (punches)	UFC Fight Night: Walker vs. Hill	February 19, 2022	1	4:24	Las Vegas, Nevada, United States	Catchweight (148 lb) bout; Benítez missed weight.
Loss	22–9	Billy Quarantillo	TKO (punches)	UFC on ESPN: Makhachev vs. Moisés	July 17, 2021	3	3:40	Las Vegas, Nevada, United States	Return to Featherweight. Fight of the Night.
Win	22–8	Justin Jaynes	TKO (knee to the body and elbows)	UFC on ESPN: Hermansson vs. Vettori	December 5, 2020	1	4:06	Las Vegas, Nevada, United States	Performance of the Night.
Loss	21–8	Omar Morales	Decision (unanimous)	UFC Fight Night: Smith vs. Teixeira	May 13, 2020	3	5:00	Jacksonville, Florida, United States	Return to Lightweight.
Loss	21–7	Sodiq Yusuff	TKO (punches)	UFC 241	August 17, 2019	1	4:14	Anaheim, California, United States	
Win	21–6	Humberto Bandenay	KO (slam)	UFC Fight Night: Maia vs. Usman	May 19, 2018	1	0:39	Santiago, Chile	Performance of the Night.
Win	20–6	Jason Knight	Decision (unanimous)	UFC Fight Night: Swanson vs. Ortega	December 9, 2017	3	5:00	Fresno, California, United States	Knight was deducted one point in round 1 for biting Benítez's fingers.
Loss	19–6	Enrique Barzola	Decision (unanimous)	UFC 211	May 13, 2017	3	5:00	Dallas, Texas, United States	
Win	19–5	Sam Sicilia	Technical Submission (guillotine choke)	UFC Fight Night: Poirier vs. Johnson	September 17, 2016	2	1:20	Hidalgo, Texas, United States	
Loss	18–5	Andre Fili	KO (head kick and punches)	The Ultimate Fighter Latin America 2 Finale: Magny vs. Gastelum	November 21, 2015	1	3:13	Monterrey, Mexico	
Win	18–4	Clay Collard	Decision (unanimous)	UFC 188	June 13, 2015	3	5:00	Mexico City, Mexico	
Win	17–4	Humberto Brown	Technical Submission (guillotine choke)	UFC 180	November 15, 2014	3	0:30	Mexico City, Mexico	Brown was deducted one point in round 2 due to repeated hits to the groin.
Win	16–4	Angelo Sanchez	Decision (unanimous)	Orthrus Promotions: Triple A MMA 5	May 29, 2014	3	5:00	Albuquerque, New Mexico, United States	Featherweight debut.
Win	15–4	Rey Trujillo	TKO (punches)	Fresquez Productions: Havoc	December 6, 2013	2	3:25	Albuquerque, New Mexico, United States	
Loss	14–4	Richard Villa	Submission (heel hook)	Jackson's MMA Series 11	August 10, 2013	1	0:52	Albuquerque, New Mexico, United States	
Loss	14–3	Rigo Oropeza	Submission (guillotine choke)	UWC Mexico 13	March 2, 2013	1	0:19	Tijuana, Mexico	
Win	14–2	Antonio Ramirez	KO (punches)	Xtreme Kombat 17	September 21, 2012	1	1:48	Mexico City, Mexico	
Win	13–2	Ryan Bixler	TKO (punches)	Xplode Fight Series: Hunted	May 19, 2012	1	1:24	Valley Center, California, United States	
Win	12–2	Jorge Lopez	Submission (rear-naked choke)	UWC Mexico 12	March 24, 2012	2	3:12	Tijuana, Mexico	
Win	11–2	Daniel Salas	Decision (unanimous)	Xtreme Fighters Latino	May 26, 2011	5	5:00	Mexico City, Mexico	
Win	10–2	Raul Bellereza	Submission (rear-naked choke)	UWC Mexico 9	March 26, 2011	1	3:29	Tijuana, Mexico	
Win	9–2	Manuel Ramos Gallareta	Submission (kimura)	UWC Mexico 5	November 28, 2010	1	1:03	Tijuana, Mexico	
Win	8–2	Tito Castro	TKO (punches)	UWC Mexico 4	November 28, 2009	2	2:15	Tijuana, Mexico	
Win	7–2	Shawn Major	Submission (armbar)	Ultimate Challenge Mexico 12	October 3, 2009	1	0:39	Tijuana, Mexico	
Win	6–2	Shawn Major	TKO (doctor stoppage)	UWC Mexico 2	May 30, 2009	1	2:13	Tijuana, Mexico	
Win	5–2	Kyle Olsen	Submission (guillotine choke)	UWC Mexico 1	February 28, 2009	1	1:24	Tijuana, Mexico	
Loss	4–2	Yaotzin Meza	Decision (unanimous)	Noche de Gladiadores	May 24, 2008	3	3:00	Hermosillo, Mexico	
Win	4–1	Alan Mar	Submission (guillotine choke)	Ultimate Challenge Mexico 6	April 19, 2008	3	2:04	Tijuana, Mexico	
Win	3–1	Dominic Gutierrez	Submission (armbar)	Tijuana Municipal Sports Institute: No Way Out	April 19, 2008	1	2:31	Tijuana, Mexico	
Loss	2–1	Emilio Chavez	Decision (unanimous)	Cage of Fire 10	November 24, 2007	3	5:00	Mexico	
Win	2–0	Tomas Huerta	KO (punches)	Ultimate Challenge Mexico 4	November 10, 2007	1	0:00	Tijuana, Mexico	
Win	1–0	Martin Perez	Submission (armbar)	Ultimate Challenge Mexico 2	July 28, 2007	2	0:00	Tijuana, Mexico	

== See also ==
- List of male mixed martial artists
- List of Mexican UFC fighters
