= Noad Lahat =

Israeli mixed martial artist

Noad Lahat נועד להט
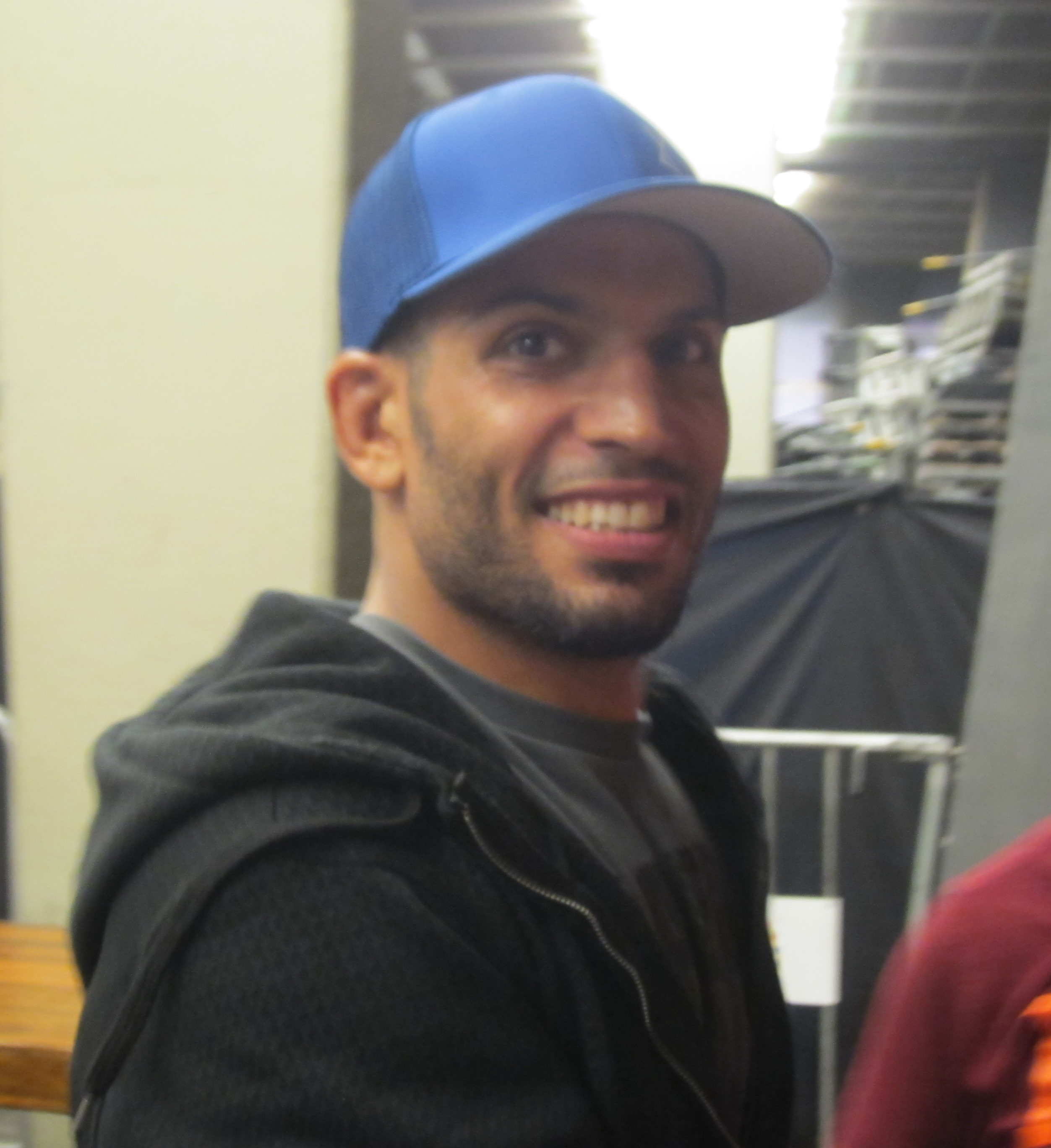
- Born: Noadya Lahat; 8 June 1984 (age 42); Petach-Tikva, Israel
- Nationality: Israeli
- Height: 5 ft 9 in (1.75 m)
- Weight: 145 lb (66 kg; 10.4 st)
- Division: Featherweight
- Reach: 69 in (175 cm)
- Fighting out of: San Jose, California
- Team: American Kickboxing Academy (2009–present) (AKA); Xtreme Couture
- Rank: Black belt in Brazilian Jiu-Jitsu; 2nd degree black belt in Judo
- Years active: 2008–present

Mixed martial arts record
- Total: 18
- Wins: 13
- By knockout: 2
- By submission: 6
- By decision: 5
- Losses: 5
- By knockout: 4
- By decision: 1

Other information
- Mixed martial arts record from Sherdog

Noadya Lahat (Hebrew: נועד להט; born June 8, 1984), also known by the nickname Neo, is an Israeli mixed martial artist who competes in the Featherweight division. A professional since 2008, he is the second Israeli to ever fight in the UFC and has competed for Bellator MMA.

== Background ==
Lahat began training in judo at age of four, eventually training with the Israeli Olympic team in his adolescent years. After a three-year stint in the Israeli Defense Forces, Lahat came back for another year of judo before finding Brazilian jiu-jitsu.

== Mixed martial arts career ==
=== Early career ===
Lahat began competing professionally in 2008, competing first as a lightweight, then as a featherweight for various regional promotions. He was able to compile an undefeated record along the way of 7–0 with six finishes before signing with the UFC in January 2014.

=== Ultimate Fighting Championship ===
Lahat made his promotional debut on March 23, 2014, against Godofredo Pepey at UFC Fight Night 38. He lost the fight via flying knee knockout in the first round.

Lahat faced Steven Siler on July 26, 2014, at UFC on Fox 12. Lahat won the fight via unanimous decision.

Lahat faced Niklas Bäckström on June 20, 2015, at UFC Fight Night 69 He won the back and forth fight by majority decision (28-28, 29–28, 29–28).

Following his military service, Lahat returned to the UFC to face Diego Rivas at UFC Fight Night: Hendricks vs. Thompson. Lahat controlled the first round, almost getting several submissions on Rivas. However, after 23 seconds in the second round he lost the fight via a flying knee knockout and was rendered unconscious for several minutes and was subsequently released from the promotion.

=== Bellator MMA ===
On June 9, 2016, it was reported that Lahat has signed a deal with Bellator MMA.

Lahat made his promotional debut against Scott Cleve at Bellator 164 on November 10, 2016. He won the fight via submission in the first round.

Lahat faced Lloyd Carter at Bellator 175 on March 31, 2017. He won the fight via submission in the second round.

Lahat faced Henry Corrales at Bellator 182 on August 25, 2017. He lost the fight by unanimous decision.

Lahat faced Jeremiah Labiano at Bellator 188 on November 16, 2017. He won via unanimous decision.

Lahat faced Bellator Bantamweight World Champion Darrion Caldwell in a non-title fight at Bellator 204 on August 17, 2018, in Sioux Falls, South Dakota. He lost the fight by knockout in the second round.

Despite defeating Brian Moore via unanimous decision at Bellator 210 on November 30, 2018, Lahat was released from the promotion.

=== Post-Bellator career ===
After parting ways with Bellator, Lahat faced Sean Soriano at UAE Warriors 18 on March 20, 2021. He lost the fight via first-round knockout.

== Mixed martial arts record ==
Professional record breakdown
18 matches	13 wins	5 losses
By knockout	2	4
By submission	6	0
By decision	5	1

Res.	Record	Opponent	Method	Event	Date	Round	Time	Location	Notes
Loss	13–5	Sean Soriano	TKO (punches)	UAE Warriors 18	March 20, 2021	1	2:01	Abu Dhabi, United Arab Emirates	
Win	13–4	Brian Moore	Decision (unanimous)	Bellator 210	November 30, 2018	3	5:00	Thackerville, Oklahoma, United States	
Loss	12–4	Darrion Caldwell	KO (punches)	Bellator 204	August 17, 2018	2	2:46	Sioux Falls, South Dakota, United States	
Win	12–3	Jeremiah Labiano	Decision (unanimous)	Bellator 188	November 16, 2017	3	5:00	Tel Aviv, Israel	
Loss	11–3	Henry Corrales	Decision (unanimous)	Bellator 182	25 August 2017	3	5:00	Verona, New York, United States	
Win	11–2	Lloyd Carter	Submission (rear-naked choke)	Bellator 175	31 March 2017	2	3:50	Rosemont, Illinois, United States	
Win	10–2	Scott Cleve	Submission (rear-naked choke)	Bellator 164	10 November 2016	1	2:26	Tel Aviv, Israel	
Loss	9–2	Diego Rivas	KO (flying knee)	UFC Fight Night: Hendricks vs. Thompson	6 February 2016	2	0:23	Las Vegas, Nevada, United States	
Win	9–1	Niklas Bäckström	Decision (majority)	UFC Fight Night: Jędrzejczyk vs. Penne	20 June 2015	3	5:00	Berlin, Germany	
Win	8–1	Steven Siler	Decision (unanimous)	UFC on Fox: Lawler vs. Brown	26 July 2014	3	5:00	San Jose, California, United States	
Loss	7–1	Godofredo Pepey	KO (flying knee)	UFC Fight Night: Shogun vs. Henderson 2	23 March 2014	1	2:39	Natal, Brazil	
Win	7–0	Shad Smith	Decision (unanimous)	BAMMA USA - Badbeat 10	9 August 2013	3	5:00	Commerce, California, United States	
Win	6–0	Rodney Rhoden	TKO (knees)	Impact MMA - Recognition	10 December 2011	2	2:31	Pleasanton, California, United States	
Win	5–0	Richard Schiller	Submission (rear-naked choke)	King of the West - Rage Against the Ropes	6 May 2010	1	2:15	Hollywood, California, United States	
Win	4–0	Pete Sabala	Submission (triangle choke)	Champion Promotions - Clash of the Gladiators 1	28 November 2009	2	2:37	Coachella, California, United States	
Win	3–0	Slava Antipenko	Submission (triangle choke)	Dog Fight 4	9 March 2009	1	2:54	Tel Aviv, Israel	
Win	2–0	Anthony Rodriguez	Submission (rear-naked choke)	All-Star Boxing - Caged in the Cannon	6 February 2009	1	1:51	Montebello, California, United States	
Win	1-0	Nikita Ivanciov	TKO (punches)	Desert Combat Challenge 7	26 July 2008	2	1:27	Tel Aviv, Israel	

== See also ==
- List of select Jewish mixed martial artists
