= UFC 180 =

UFC mixed martial arts event in 2014

UFC 180: Werdum vs. Hunt
- The poster for UFC 180: Werdum vs. Hunt
- Promotion: Ultimate Fighting Championship
- Date: November 15, 2014
- Venue: Arena Ciudad de México
- City: Mexico City, Mexico
- Attendance: 21,000
- Buyrate: 185,000

Event chronology
UFC Fight Night: Shogun vs. Saint Preux	UFC 180: Werdum vs. Hunt	UFC Fight Night: Edgar vs. Swanson

UFC 180: Werdum vs. Hunt was a mixed martial arts event held on November 15, 2014, at Arena Ciudad de México in Mexico City, Mexico.

== Background ==
The event was the first the organization hosted in Mexico and was so popular that all 21,000 tickets were sold out in 8 hours.

The event was expected to be headlined by a UFC Heavyweight Championship bout between the current champion Cain Velasquez and top contender Fabrício Werdum. However, on October 21, it was announced that Velasquez was forced to pull out of the bout due to an injured knee and was replaced by Mark Hunt. That also changed the originally planned title fight into an interim title bout.

Also featured on the card were the featherweight and bantamweight finals of the inaugural installment of The Ultimate Fighter: Latin America.

Norman Parke was expected to face Diego Sanchez at the event. However, Parke pulled out of the bout in early October citing a knee injury and was briefly replaced by Joe Lauzon. In turn, injuries to both Sanchez and Lauzon led to the pairing being scrapped altogether.

Erik Pérez was expected to face Marcus Brimage at the event. However, Pérez pulled out of the bout due to a shoulder injury. In turn, Brimage was then pulled from the card as well and was matched up with Jumabieke Tuerxun for an earlier bout at UFC Fight Night: Rockhold vs. Bisping.

Two announced bouts between The Ultimate Fighter: Latin America contestants Masio Fullen vs. Alexander Torres and Fredy Serrano vs. Bentley Syler, previously linked to this event were postponed and will be rescheduled at future events.

== Results ==
Main card
Weight class				Method	Round	Time	Notes
Heavyweight	Fabrício Werdum	def.	Mark Hunt	TKO (flying knee and punches)	2	2:27	(Note: For the interim UFC Heavyweight Championship.)
Welterweight	Kelvin Gastelum	def.	Jake Ellenberger	Submission (rear-naked choke)	1	4:46
Featherweight	Ricardo Lamas	def.	Dennis Bermudez	Submission (guillotine choke)	1	3:18
Welterweight	Augusto Montaño	def.	Chris Heatherly	TKO (knees)	1	4:50
Welterweight	Héctor Urbina	def.	Edgar García	Submission (guillotine choke)	1	3:38
Preliminary card (Fox Sports 1)
Featherweight	Yair Rodríguez	def.	Leonardo Morales	Decision (unanimous) (29–28, 29–28, 29–28)	3	5:00	(Note: The Ultimate Fighter: Latin America Featherweight Final)
Bantamweight	Alejandro Pérez	def.	José Alberto Quiñónez	Decision (unanimous) (29–26, 29–26, 28–27)	3	5:00	(Note: The Ultimate Fighter: Latin America Bantamweight Final; Quiñónez was docked two points in round 3 due to a headbutt.)
Women's Bantamweight	Jessica Eye	def.	Leslie Smith	TKO (doctor stoppage)	2	1:30
Featherweight	Gabriel Benítez	def.	Humberto Brown	Technical Submission (standing guillotine choke)	3	0:30	(Note: Brown had 1 point deducted in round 2 due to repeated hits to the groin.)
Preliminary card (UFC Fight Pass)
Bantamweight	Henry Briones	def.	Guido Cannetti	Submission (rear-naked choke)	2	1:44
Bantamweight	Marco Beltrán	def.	Marlon Vera	Decision (unanimous) (29–28, 29–28, 29–28)	3	5:00

== Bonus awards ==
The following fighters were awarded $50,000 bonuses:

- Fight of the Night: Henry Briones vs. Guido Cannetti
- Performance of the Night: Fabrício Werdum and Kelvin Gastelum

== See also ==
- List of UFC events
- 2014 in UFC
