= Henry Briones =

Mexican mixed martial artist

- Born: Jose Enrique Briones; October 22, 1980 (age 45); Tijuana, Baja California, Mexico
- Other names: Bure
- Height: 5 ft 7 in (1.70 m)
- Weight: 61 kg (134 lb; 9 st 8 lb)
- Division: Bantamweight
- Reach: 69 in (175 cm)
- Style: Boxing, BJJ
- Fighting out of: Tijuana, Baja California, Mexico
- Team: Entram Gym
- Years active: 2007–present

Mixed martial arts record
- Total: 25
- Wins: 16
- By knockout: 8
- By submission: 6
- By decision: 2
- Losses: 8
- By knockout: 1
- By submission: 2
- By decision: 5
- Draws: 1

Other information
- Mixed martial arts record from Sherdog

Jose Enrique Briones (born October 22, 1980), better known as Henry Briones, is a Mexican mixed martial artist and competed in Bantamweight division of the Ultimate Fighting Championship (UFC).

== Background ==
Briones grew up in Tijuana playing inline hockey due to the lack of ice hockey rinks in his native Mexico. For his senior year in the high school, Henry moved to live with his aunt in Tulsa, Oklahoma in pursuit of professional ice hockey career. However, his dream did not materialize and he returned to Mexico to attend law school. Compared to most of the mixed martial arts fighters, Briones started combat sport much later in life. He started training MMA when he joined Entram Gym at the age of 26.

== Mixed martial arts career ==
=== Early career ===
Briones fought primary in the Mexico circuit and amassed a record of 15-4–1 prior joining the UFC. Initially, Briones tried out for UFC's Latin America developmental program and was accepted into it.

=== The Ultimate Fighter ===
After training at Jackson's MMA for over a year at UFC's expense, he was a participant in The Ultimate Fighter: Latin America 1, an installment of the Ultimate Fighting Championship (UFC) produced reality TV series "The Ultimate Fighter" in May 2014. He faced Marlon Vera on quarter-final round and lost the fight, failing to be selected as one of the contestants of the show.

=== Ultimate Fighting Championship ===
Briones made his promotional debut on November 15, 2014, at UFC 180 in Mexico City against Guido Cannetti. He won the fight via rear-nake choke in round two. He earned a Fight of the Night bonus for his performance.

He next faced Cody Garbrandt on July 11, 2015, at UFC 189. He lost the fight via unanimous decision.

Briones was scheduled to faced Brad Pickett on February 27, 016 at UFC Fight Night: Silva vs. Bisping, but he pulled out from the fight, citing injury, and was replaced by Francisco Rivera. The match was rescheduled to UFC Fight Night: Arlovski vs. Barnett six months later on September 3, 2016, and the bout was removed where Briones for undisclosed reasons and was replaced by Iuri Alcântara.

On November 5, 2016, Brinoes took on Douglas Silva de Andrade at UFC Fight Night: Dos Anjos vs. Ferguson. A spinning back fist from Silva de Andrade sent Briones to the ground and he lost the fight on round 3.

The bout between Briones and Brad Pickett was rescheduled for the third time on March 18, 2017, at UFC Fight Night: Manuwa vs. Anderson, and yet again the bout was cancelled due to Briones withdrew from the fight one week before the event and was replaced by Marlon Vera.

Briones faced Rani Yahya on August 5, 2017, at UFC Fight Night: Pettis vs. Moreno. He lost the fight via a kimura submission in the first round.

Briones faced Frankie Saenz on May 19, 2018, at UFC Fight Night 129. He lost the fight by unanimous decision.

On November 5, 2019, it was announced that Briones had been released from the UFC following four straight losses in the promotion.

== Personal life ==
Briones' moniker "Bure" was coined by hockey fans where they saw the similarity between Briones and the Russian ice hockey player, Pavel Bure, during his high school years when Brones played hockey league in Mexico. Briones decided to keep the nickname given by fans to honour them where he spent 14 years of his life in the sport.

Briones worked in a law firm during the weekdays and worked as a bar tender during the weekends prior to fighting professionally.

== Championships and accomplishments ==
=== Mixed martial arts ===
- Cage Gladiators
  - Cage Gladiators Lightweight Champion (One time) vs. Joe Gustina
- Ultimate Fighting Championship
  - Fight of the Night (One time) vs. Guido Cannetti

== Mixed martial arts record ==
Professional record breakdown
25 matches	16 wins	8 losses
By knockout	8	1
By submission	6	2
By decision	2	5
Draws	1	

Res.	Record	Opponent	Method	Event	Date	Round	Time	Location	Notes
Loss	16–8–1	Frankie Saenz	Decision (unanimous)	UFC Fight Night: Maia vs. Usman	May 19, 2018	3	5:00	Santiago, Chile	
Loss	16–7–1	Rani Yahya	Submission (kimura)	UFC Fight Night: Pettis vs. Moreno	August 5, 2017	1	2:01	Mexico City, Mexico	
Loss	16–6–1	Douglas Silva de Andrade	TKO (spinning backfist)	The Ultimate Fighter Latin America 3 Finale: dos Anjos vs. Ferguson	November 5, 2016	3	2:33	Mexico City, Mexico	
Loss	16–5–1	Cody Garbrandt	Decision (unanimous)	UFC 189	July 11, 2015	3	5:00	Las Vegas, Nevada, United States	
Win	16–4–1	Guido Cannetti	Submission (rear-naked choke)	UFC 180	November 15, 2014	2	1:44	Mexico City, Mexico	Fight of the Night.
Draw	15–4–1	Adrian Cruz	Draw (split)	Legacy Fighting Championship 30	April 4, 2014	3	5:00	Albuquerque, New Mexico, United States	
Win	15–4	Jeff Golden	Submission (arm-triangle choke)	Total Fight Championship 3	September 1, 2012	3	0:35	Manzanillo, Mexico	
Win	14–4	Jared Carlsten	KO (punch)	MEZ Sports: Pandemonium 7	August 18, 2012	1	0:32	Inglewood, California, United States	
Win	13–4	Fernando Rodriguez	TKO (punches)	TSC 2	June 23, 2012	1	0:00	Monterrey, Mexico	
Win	12–4	Manuel Ramos Gallareta	Decision (unanimos)	UWC Mexico 12	March 24, 2012	3	5:00	Tijuana, Mexico	
Win	11–4	Ismael Vasquez Segura	TKO (punches)	UWC Mexico 11	October 1, 2011	1	3:34	Tijuana, Mexico	
Win	10–4	Eddie Mendez	TKO (punches)	Mexico Fighter 3	July 15, 2011	1	4:41	Sonora, Mexico	
Loss	9–4	Brady Harrison	Decision (split)	UWC Mexico 10	June 17, 2011	3	5:00	Tijuana, Mexico	
Win	9–3	Chris Kogel	TKO (corner stoppage)	Baja Cage Fighting 1	July 17, 2010	1	4:30	Tijuana, Mexico	
Win	8–3	Joe Gustina	Submission (rear-naked choke)	Cage Gladiators 3	May 22, 2010	2	N/A	Mexico	Won the Cage Gladiators Lightweight Championship.
Loss	7–3	Alex Soto	Decision (split)	UWC Mexico 5	February 13, 2010	3	5:00	Tijuana, Mexico	
Win	7–2	Esteban Velazco	TKO (punches)	Club Maya: Briones vs. Velasco	January 5, 2010	1	1:48	Rosarito, Mexico	
Loss	6–2	Mike de la Torre	Decision (unanimous)	Ultimate Challenge Mexico 12	October 3, 2009	5	5:00	Tijuana, Mexico	
Win	6–1	Juan Delgado	Submission (triangle choke)	UWC Mexico 3	July 18, 2009	1	3:11	Tijuana, Mexico	
Win	5–1	Hidred Oliney	Submission (triangle choke)	UWC Mexico 2	May 30, 2009	1	4:18	Tijuana, Mexico	
Loss	4–1	Bobby Green	Submission (triangle choke)	Ultimate Challenge Mexico 5	February 23, 2008	1	0:48	Tijuana, Mexico	
Win	4–0	Sipanhya Koummalasy	KO (punches)	Ultimate Challenge Mexico 3	September 29, 2007	1	0:00	Mexico	
Win	3–0	Mario Zarate	TKO (punches)	Ultimate Challenge Mexico 2	July 28, 2007	1	0:00	Tijuana, Mexico	
Win	2–0	Juan Manuel Torres	Submission (strikes)	Cage on Fire 6	April 14, 2007	2	1:59	Tijuana, Mexico	
Win	1–0	Gabriel Palmares	Decision (unanimous)	Cage on Fire 5	January 27, 2007	3	3:00	Tijuana, Mexico	

== Mixed martial arts exhibition record ==
Exhibition record breakdown		
1 match	0 wins	1 loss
By knockout	0	1

Res.	Record	Opponent	Method	Event	Date	Round	Time	Location	Notes
Loss	0–1	Marlon Vera	KO (upkick)	The Ultimate Fighter: Latin America	Sep 17, 2014 (airdate)	2	N/A	Las Vegas, Nevada, United States	The Ultimate Fighter: Latin America Elimination round.

== See also ==
- List of male mixed martial artists
- List of Mexican UFC fighters
