= Yair Rodríguez =

Mexican mixed martial artist (born 1992)

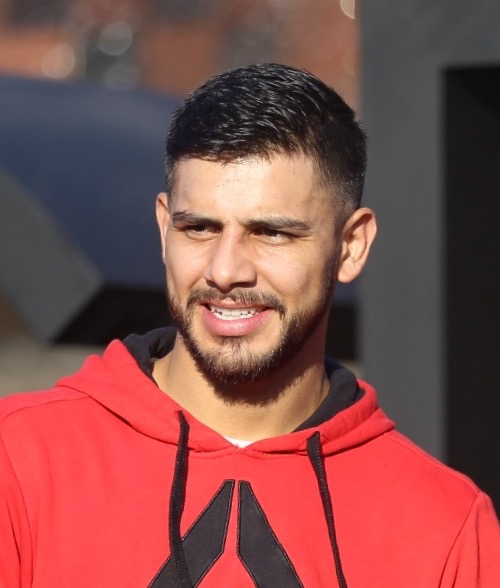
- Rodríguez in 2016
- Born: Yair Raziel Rodríguez Portillo; October 6, 1992 (age 34); Parral, Chihuahua, Mexico
- Other names: El Pantera (The Panther)
- Height: 5 ft 11 in (1.80 m)
- Weight: 145 lb (66 kg; 10 st 5 lb)
- Division: Featherweight
- Reach: 71 in (180 cm)
- Fighting out of: Parral, Chihuahua, Mexico
- Team: Huntington Beach Ultimate Training Center; Jackson Wink MMA Academy (former); Kings MMA; Valle Flow Striking (former)
- Rank: Black belt in Taekwondo
- Years active: 2011–present

Mixed martial arts record
- Total: 26
- Wins: 20
- By knockout: 8
- By submission: 5
- By decision: 7
- Losses: 5
- By knockout: 3
- By submission: 1
- By decision: 1
- No contests: 1

Other information
- Mixed martial arts record from Sherdog

Yair Raziel Rodríguez Portillo (born October 6, 1992) is a Mexican professional mixed martial artist. He currently competes in the Featherweight division of the Ultimate Fighting Championship (UFC), where he is a former Interim UFC Featherweight Champion. A professional since 2011, Rodríguez has been with the UFC since 2014 after winning The Ultimate Fighter: Latin America featherweight tournament.

== Early life ==
Yair Raziel Rodríguez Portillo was born and raised in Parral, Chihuahua, Mexico to Rigoberto Rodríguez Olivas and Norma Alicia Portillo. Rodríguez started Taekwondo at age five.

== Mixed martial arts career ==
=== Early career ===
Rodríguez made his professional mixed martial arts (MMA) debut on October 10, 2011, at Mexican Fighter Promotions 8, when he fought Jonatan Guzmán and won via unanimous decision. On March 10, 2012, he fought Carlos Ricardo at The Supreme Cage Fighting 1. He won via third round submission (triangle choke). Rodríguez then fought Luis Roberto Herrera on December 12, 2012, at Mexican Fighter Promotions 13. He lost via first-round knockout. Rodríguez next faced Édgar Juárez on February 16, 2013, at Mexican Fighter Promotions 14. He won the fight via first-round knockout. His final fight before he entered the UFC was against Angelo Durante on April 4, 2014, at NP: High Altitude Face Off 6. Rodríguez won the fight via arm-bar in round one.

=== The Ultimate Fighter ===
In May 2014, it was revealed that Rodríguez would be a cast member of The Ultimate Fighter: Latin America, competing for "Team Velasquez".

In his first fight on the show, Rodríguez defeated Humberto Brown in the quarterfinals via submission (triangle choke). In the semifinals, Rodríguez defeated Rudolfo Rubio via submission (strikes) to reach the finals.

=== Ultimate Fighting Championship ===
Rodríguez made his official UFC debut on November 15, 2014, at UFC 180, facing Leonardo Morales in The Ultimate Fighter: Latin America featherweight finals. Rodríguez defeated Morales via unanimous decision to become the tournament winner.

For his second fight with the promotion, Rodríguez faced Charles Rosa on June 13, 2015, at UFC 188. He won the fight via split decision. Rodríguez received his first Fight of the Night bonus award.

Rodríguez faced Dan Hooker on October 3, 2015, at UFC 192. He won the fight via unanimous decision.

Rodríguez faced Andre Fili on April 23, 2016, at UFC 197. He won the fight via knockout in the second round and was awarded his first Performance of the Night bonus.

Rodríguez faced Alex Caceres on August 6, 2016, at UFC Fight Night 92. He won the fight by split decision. Both participants were awarded Fight of the Night honors.

Rodríguez faced B.J. Penn on January 15, 2017, at UFC Fight Night 103. Rodríguez won the fight via TKO in the second round. Afterwards, he was awarded a Performance of the Night bonus.

Rodríguez faced Frankie Edgar on May 13, 2017, at UFC 211. He lost the fight via TKO (doctor stoppage) after the second round due to swelling on his left eye.

On May 10, 2018, it was reported that Rodríguez was released from the UFC after allegedly declining two fights. Three weeks later, Rodríguez announced that he and UFC officials worked out their differences and that he was back on the roster.

Rodríguez was expected to face Zabit Magomedsharipov on September 8, 2018, at UFC 228. However, Rodríguez pulled out of the fight on August 23 citing injury.

In late October, Rodríguez agreed to replace Frankie Edgar and fight Chan Sung Jung on November 10, 2018, at UFC Fight Night 139, after Edgar withdrew due to injury. Rodríguez won the fight by knockout via reverse elbow at 4:59 in the fifth round; the latest knockout in UFC history. However this record would later be tied by Max Holloway against Justin Gaethje at UFC 300. He was awarded the Fight of the Night and Performance of the Night awards. The knockout went on to win accolades as the knockout of the year from many media sources.

Rodríguez faced Jeremy Stephens on September 21, 2019, in the main event at UFC Fight Night 159. The bout ended in a no contest just 15 seconds into the first round after Rodríguez accidentally swatted Stephens in the left eye, rendering him unable to continue.

Rodríguez faced Stephens in a rematch on October 18, 2019, at UFC on ESPN 6. He won the fight via unanimous decision. This fight earned him the Fight of the Night award.

Rodríguez was scheduled to face Zabit Magomedsharipov on August 29, 2020, at UFC Fight Night 175. However, Rodríguez pulled out with an ankle injury.

On December 3, 2020, UFC anti-doping administrator USADA announced that Rodríguez had been suspended for 6 months, retroactive to September 8, for failing to notify USADA of his whereabouts and being unavailable for drug testing. He became eligible to resume fighting on March 8, 2021.

Rodríguez was scheduled to face Max Holloway on July 17, 2021, at UFC on ESPN 26. Rodríguez's return was delayed once more, as it was reported on June 17, 2021, that Holloway was forced to withdraw from the bout due to injury. The bout was rescheduled on November 13, 2021, at UFC Fight Night 197. Rodríguez lost the fight via unanimous decision. This fight earned him the Fight of the Night award.

Rodríguez faced Brian Ortega on July 16, 2022, at UFC on ABC 3. He won the fight via technical knockout in round one after Ortega suffered a dislocated shoulder, which rendered him unable to continue.

Rodríguez faced Josh Emmett for the Interim UFC Featherweight Championship on February 12, 2023, at UFC 284. He won the fight and title via triangle choke submission in the second round. The win earned him the Performance of the Night award.

Rodríguez faced Alexander Volkanovski in a title unification bout for the UFC Featherweight Championship on July 8, 2023, at UFC 290. He lost the fight via TKO in round three.

Rodríguez faced Brian Ortega in a rematch on February 24, 2024, at UFC Fight Night 237. He lost in the third-round via arm-triangle choke submission.

Rodríguez was reportedly scheduled to face Diego Lopes on March 29, 2025, at UFC on ESPN 64. However, Lopes later denied the fight ever happened.

Rodríguez faced former Bellator Lightweight and Featherweight champion Patrício Pitbull on April 12, 2025, at UFC 314. He won the fight by unanimous decision.

Rodríguez was scheduled to face Jean Silva in the main event on September 12, 2026, at UFC Fight Night 288. However, Rodríguez withdrew from the fight due to an injury and was replaced by Jose Delgado.

Rodríguez was scheduled to face Steve Garcia on December 12, 2026, at UFC 335. However, for undisclosed reasons, the bout was moved to serve as the headliner on January 16, 2027, at UFC Fight Night 296.

== Personal life ==
Rodríguez has one brother and one sister. He is also a cousin of Olympic boxer Misael Rodríguez.

== Championships and accomplishments ==
=== Mixed martial arts ===
- Ultimate Fighting Championship
  - UFC Interim Featherweight Champion (One time)
  - The Ultimate Fighter: Latin America Tournament Winner
  - Fight of the Night (Five times) vs. Charles Rosa, Alex Caceres, Chan Sung Jung, Jeremy Stephens and Max Holloway
  - Performance of the Night (Four times) vs. Andre Fili, B.J. Penn, Chan Sung Jung and Josh Emmett
    - Tied (Jung Chan-sung) for third most post-fight bonuses in UFC Featherweight division history (9)
  - Latest knockout in UFC history (4:59 in Round 5) vs. Chan Sung Jung
  - UFC Honors Awards
    - 2021: President's Choice Fight of the Year Nominee vs. Max Holloway
  - UFC.com Awards
    - 2015: Ranked #7 Fight of the Year vs. Charles Rosa
    - 2016: Ranked #4 Knockout of the Year vs. Andre Fili
    - 2018: Knockout of the Year & Ranked #3 Fight of the Year vs. Jung Chan-sung
    - 2019: Ranked #10 Fight of the Year vs. Jeremy Stephens 2
    - 2021: Ranked #3 Fight of the Year vs. Max Holloway
    - 2023: Ranked #7 Submission of the Year vs. Josh Emmett
- Mexican Fighters Promotions
  - FMP Featherweight Championship (One time)
- ESPN
  - 2018 Knockout of the Year vs. Jung Chan-sung at UFC Fight Night: The Korean Zombie vs. Rodríguez
- Sherdog
  - 2018 Knockout of the Year vs. Jung Chan-sung
- MMA Fighting
  - 2018 Knockout of the Year vs. Jung Chan-sung
- MMA Junkie
  - 2016 #3 Ranked Knockout of the Year vs. Andre Fili at UFC 197
  - 2018 Knockout of the Year vs. Jung Chan-sung
  - 2019 October Fight of the Month vs. Jeremy Stephens
- Combat Press
  - 2018 Knockout of the Year vs. Jung Chan-sung
- Cageside Press
  - 2018 Knockout of the Year vs. Jung Chan-sung at UFC Fight Night 139
- MMADNA.nl
  - 2018 Knockout of the Year vs. Jung Chan-sung
- Bleacher Report
  - 2018 Fight of the Year vs. Jung Chan-sung at UFC Fight Night 139
  - 2018 Knockout of the Year vs. Jung Chan-sung at UFC Fight Night 139
- CBS Sports
  - 2018 #3 Ranked UFC Fight of the Year vs. Jung Chan-sung
  - 2018 UFC Knockout of the Year vs. Jung Chan-sung
- MMA Sucka
  - 2018 Knockout of the Year vs. Jung Chan-sung at UFC Fight Night: The Korean Zombie vs. Rodríguez

== Mixed martial arts record ==
Professional record breakdown
26 matches	20 wins	5 losses
By knockout	8	3
By submission	5	1
By decision	7	1
No contests	1	

Res.	Record	Opponent	Method	Event	Date	Round	Time	Location	Notes
Win	20–5 (1)	Patrício Pitbull	Decision (unanimous)	UFC 314	April 12, 2025	3	5:00	Miami, Florida, United States	
Loss	19–5 (1)	Brian Ortega	Submission (arm-triangle choke)	UFC Fight Night: Moreno vs. Royval 2	February 24, 2024	3	0:58	Mexico City, Mexico	
Loss	19–4 (1)	Alexander Volkanovski	TKO (punches)	UFC 290	July 8, 2023	3	4:19	Las Vegas, Nevada, United States	For the UFC Featherweight Championship.
Win	19–3 (1)	Josh Emmett	Submission (triangle choke)	UFC 284	February 12, 2023	2	4:19	Perth, Australia	Won the interim UFC Featherweight Championship. Performance of the Night.
Win	18–3 (1)	Brian Ortega	TKO (shoulder injury)	UFC on ABC: Ortega vs. Rodríguez	July 16, 2022	1	4:11	Elmont, New York, United States	
Loss	17–3 (1)	Max Holloway	Decision (unanimous)	UFC Fight Night: Holloway vs. Rodríguez	November 13, 2021	5	5:00	Las Vegas, Nevada, United States	Fight of the Night.
Win	17–2 (1)	Jeremy Stephens	Decision (unanimous)	UFC on ESPN: Reyes vs. Weidman	October 18, 2019	3	5:00	Boston, Massachusetts, United States	Fight of the Night.
NC	16–2 (1)	Jeremy Stephens	NC (accidental eye poke)	UFC Fight Night: Rodríguez vs. Stephens	September 21, 2019	1	0:15	Mexico City, Mexico	Accidental eye poke rendered Stephens unable to continue.
Win	16–2	Jung Chan-sung	KO (elbow)	UFC Fight Night: The Korean Zombie vs. Rodríguez	November 10, 2018	5	4:59	Denver, Colorado, United States	Performance of the Night. Fight of the Night.
Loss	15–2	Frankie Edgar	TKO (doctor stoppage)	UFC 211	May 13, 2017	2	5:00	Dallas, Texas, United States	
Win	15–1	B.J. Penn	TKO (punches)	UFC Fight Night: Rodríguez vs. Penn	January 15, 2017	2	0:24	Phoenix, Arizona, United States	Performance of the Night.
Win	14–1	Alex Caceres	Decision (split)	UFC Fight Night: Rodríguez vs. Caceres	August 6, 2016	5	5:00	Salt Lake City, Utah, United States	Fight of the Night.
Win	13–1	Andre Fili	KO (head kick)	UFC 197	April 23, 2016	2	2:15	Las Vegas, Nevada, United States	Performance of the Night.
Win	12–1	Dan Hooker	Decision (unanimous)	UFC 192	October 3, 2015	3	5:00	Houston, Texas, United States	
Win	11–1	Charles Rosa	Decision (split)	UFC 188	June 13, 2015	3	5:00	Mexico City, Mexico	Fight of the Night.
Win	10–1	Leonardo Morales	Decision (unanimous)	UFC 180	November 15, 2014	3	5:00	Mexico City, Mexico	Return to Featherweight. Won The Ultimate Fighter: Latin America Featherweight Tournament.
Win	9–1	Angelo Duarte	Submission (armbar)	Nemesis Promotions: High Altitude Face Off 6	April 4, 2014	1	2:12,	Alamosa, Colorado, United States	
Win	8–1	Édgar Juárez	KO (flying knee)	Mexican Fighters Promotions 14	February 16, 2013	1	0:19	Ciudad Jiménez, Mexico	Lightweight debut.
Loss	7–1	Luis Roberto Herrera	KO (punches)	Mexican Fighters Promotions 13	December 20, 2012	1	1:21	Chihuahua City, Mexico	Lost the FMP Featherweight Championship.
Win	7–0	Ricardo Alcala	KO (knee)	Mexican Fighters Promotions 11	May 25, 2012	1	0:20	Chihuahua City, Mexico	Defended the FMP Featherweight Championship.
Win	6–0	Carlos Ricardo	Submission (triangle choke)	The Supreme Cage 1	March 10, 2012	3	0:50	Monterrey, Mexico	
Win	5–0	Luis Roberto Herrera	Submission (rear-naked choke)	Mexican Fighters Promotions 10	March 3, 2012	2	2:20	Hidalgo del Parral, Mexico	
Win	4–0	Edgar Balderrama	Submission (rear-naked choke)	Mexican Fighters Promotions 9	December 22, 2011	1	2:13	Chihuahua City, Mexico	
Win	3–0	Jonatan Guzmán	Decision (unanimous)	Mexican Fighters Promotions 8	September 17, 2011	5	3:00	Hidalgo del Parral, Mexico	Won the FMP Featherweight Championship.
Win	2–0	Willie Martinez	TKO (punches)	Mexican Fighters Promotions 7	July 30, 2011	3	2:22	Chihuahua City, Mexico	Featherweight debut.
Win	1–0	Luis Daniel Gonzalez	KO (flying switch kick and punches)	Mexican Fighters Promotions 5	January 29, 2011	1	1:37	Hidalgo del Parral, Mexico	Bantamweight debut.

=== Mixed martial arts exhibition record ===
Exhibition record breakdown		
2 matches	2 wins	0 losses
By knockout	1	0
By submission	1	0

Res.	Record	Opponent	Method	Event	Date	Round	Time	Location	Notes
Win	2–0	Rodolfo Rubio Perez	TKO (punches)	The Ultimate Fighter: Latin America	September 24, 2014 (airdate)	1	3:55	Las Vegas, Nevada, United States	The Ultimate Fighter: Latin America Semi-final round.
Win	1–0	Humberto Brown Morrison	Submission (triangle choke)	The Ultimate Fighter: Latin America	September 10, 2014 (airdate)	2	2:18	Las Vegas, Nevada, United States	The Ultimate Fighter: Latin America Quarterfinal round.

== Pay-per-view bouts ==
No	Event	Fight	Date	Venue	City	PPV buys
1.	UFC 290	Volkanovski vs. Rodríguez	July 8, 2023	T-Mobile Arena	Paradise, Nevada, United States	Not Disclosed

== Filmography ==
Year	Title	Role	Notes
2014	The Ultimate Fighter	Himself	Television series
2016	UFC 200 Greatest Fighters of All Time	Himself	Television mini-series
2018	El Pantera	Himself	Documentary film

== See also ==
- List of current UFC fighters
- List of Mexican UFC fighters
- List of male mixed martial artists

Awards and achievements
Vacant Title last held by Max Holloway	4th UFC Interim Featherweight Champion; February 12, 2023 – July 8, 2023	Vacant
