= UFC Fight Night: Maia vs. Usman =

UFC mixed martial arts event in 2018

- The poster for UFC Fight Night: Maia vs. Usman
- Promotion: Ultimate Fighting Championship
- Date: May 19, 2018
- Venue: Movistar Arena
- City: Santiago, Chile
- Attendance: 11,082

Event chronology
UFC 224: Nunes vs. Pennington	UFC Fight Night: Maia vs. Usman	UFC Fight Night: Thompson vs. Till

UFC Fight Night: Maia vs. Usman (also known as UFC Fight Night 129) was a mixed martial arts event produced by the Ultimate Fighting Championship that was held on May 19, 2018, at Movistar Arena in Santiago, Chile.

== Background ==
The event marked the promotion's first visit to Chile.

A welterweight bout between The Ultimate Fighter: American Top Team vs. Blackzilians welterweight winner Kamaru Usman and Santiago Ponzinibbio was expected to serve as the event headliner. However, Ponzinibbio pulled out on April 21 due to injury. He was replaced by former UFC Welterweight and Middleweight Championship challenger Demian Maia.

A flyweight bout between former UFC Flyweight Championship challenger Ray Borg and Brandon Moreno was originally expected to take place at UFC Fight Night: Cowboy vs. Medeiros. However, due to a minor injury sustained by Moreno, the pairing was postponed and rescheduled to take place at UFC 223. The bout was delayed again, after Borg had issues related to glass shards in his eye as a result of the former UFC Featherweight and Lightweight Champion Conor McGregor and crew bus melee. The pairing was scheduled again and was expected to take place at this event. However, Borg withdrew from the bout to take care of his child, who required brain surgery. He was replaced by Alexandre Pantoja.

A light heavyweight bout between former UFC Light Heavyweight Champion Maurício Rua and former title challenger Volkan Oezdemir was expected to take place at this event. However, it was reported on April 13, 2018, that Oezdemir was pulled from the event due to alleged visa issues stemming from a previous legal transgression, restricting his travel to Chile. The pairing was left intact and rescheduled for July 22, 2018, at UFC Fight Night: Volkan vs. Shogun.

== Results ==
Main card (Fox Sports 1)
Weight class				Method	Round	Time	Notes
Welterweight	Kamaru Usman	def.	Demian Maia	Decision (unanimous) (50–45, 49–46, 49–46)	5	5:00
Women's Strawweight	Tatiana Suarez	def.	Alexa Grasso	Submission (rear-naked choke)	1	2:44
Light Heavyweight	Dominick Reyes	def.	Jared Cannonier	TKO (punches)	1	2:55
Bantamweight	Guido Cannetti	def.	Diego Rivas	Decision (unanimous) (29–28, 29–28, 29–28)	3	5:00
Women's Flyweight	Andrea Lee	def.	Veronica Macedo	Decision (unanimous) (30–27, 30–27, 30–27)	3	5:00
Welterweight	Vicente Luque	def.	Chad Laprise	KO (punches)	1	4:16
Preliminary card (Fox Sports 2)
Welterweight	Michel Prazeres	def.	Zak Cummings	Decision (split) (29–28, 28–29, 29–28)	3	5:00
Flyweight	Alexandre Pantoja	def.	Brandon Moreno	Decision (unanimous) (30–26, 30–26, 29–27)	3	5:00
Women's Strawweight	Poliana Botelho	def.	Syuri Kondo	TKO (body kick and punches)	1	0:33
Featherweight	Gabriel Benítez	def.	Humberto Bandenay	KO (slam and punches)	1	0:39
Preliminary card (UFC Fight Pass)
Featherweight	Enrique Barzola	def.	Brandon Davis	Decision (unanimous) (30–27, 30–26, 30–26)	3	5:00
Bantamweight	Frankie Saenz	def.	Henry Briones	Decision (unanimous) (30–27, 30–27, 30–26)	3	5:00
Lightweight	Claudio Puelles	def.	Felipe Silva	Submission (kneebar)	3	2:23

== Bonus awards ==
The following fighters were awarded $50,000 bonuses:

- Fight of the Night: Andrea Lee vs. Veronica Macedo
- Performance of the Night: Gabriel Benítez and Claudio Puelles

== See also ==
- List of UFC events
- List of current UFC fighters
- 2018 in UFC
