= Marco Beltrán =

Mexican mixed martial artist

- Born: Marco Antonio Beltrán García; May 18, 1986 (age 40); Morelia, Michoacán, Mexico
- Other names: Psycho
- Height: 5 ft 8 in (173 cm)
- Weight: 135 lb (61 kg; 9 st 9 lb)
- Division: Flyweight; Bantamweight
- Reach: 71 in (180 cm)
- Style: Brazilian Jiu-Jitsu
- Fighting out of: Mexico City, Mexico
- Team: Valle Flow Striking
- Rank: Brown belt in Brazilian jiu-jitsu
- Years active: 2008–present

Mixed martial arts record
- Total: 30
- Wins: 19
- By knockout: 4
- By submission: 11
- By decision: 4
- Losses: 10
- By knockout: 2
- By submission: 6
- By decision: 2
- No contests: 1

Other information
- Mixed martial arts record from Sherdog

Marco Antonio Beltrán García (born May 18, 1986) is a Mexican mixed martial artist who competes mainly in the Bantamweight division. A professional mixed martial artist since 2008, Beltrán has also competed in the Ultimate Fighting Championship (UFC). He also won the LUX Bantamweight Championship, becoming its inaugural champion.

== Early life ==
Beltrán was born in Mexico City. Aged 3, he moved to Morelia, Michoacán, where he lived until begin to compete for the Ultimate Fighting Championship. During the phase of middle school, he was a practitioner of boxing. Later on his life, Marco Beltrán began his mixed martial arts training at the Top Brother México in Morelia.

== Mixed martial arts career ==
=== Early career ===
Beltrán became a professional mixed martial arts fighter in 2008. He won his MMA debut fight by submitting Christian Martínez on August 16, 2008.

After this victory, he entered in a five-fight winning streak which finished in 2012 when Beltrán was submitted by Israel Girón in the Xtreme Kombat 15 event.

On his following bout, Beltrán faced up Rodolfo Rubio. He lost the fight via first-round submission.

He lost his third fight in a row when Diego Huerto beat him by technical knockout in a World Best Gladiators event held in Ciudad Cuauhtémoc, Chihuahua. Following that fight, he tried out for The Ultimate Fighter in 2014.

=== The Ultimate Fighter: Latin America ===
In May 2014, it was revealed that Beltrán was a cast member of The Ultimate Fighter: Latin America, competing for Team Velasquez.

In his first bout on the show, Beltrán defeated Guido Cannetti via majority decision.

In the semi-finals, Beltrán was defeated by José Alberto Quiñonez via unanimous decision.

=== Ultimate Fighting Championship ===
Beltrán made his official debut against fellow castmate Marlon Vera on November 15, 2014, at UFC 180. He won the fight via unanimous decision.

Beltrán next faced Ning Guangyou on November 28, 2015, at UFC Fight Night 79. He won the fight via split decision.

Beltrán faced Reginaldo Vieira on July 7, 2016, at UFC Fight Night 90. After knocking Vieira down, Beltrán won the fight via submission in the second round.

Beltrán was expected to face former TUF: Latin America opponent Guido Cannetti on November 5, 2016, at The Ultimate Fighter Latin America 3 Finale. However, on October 29, Cannetti was pulled from the bout after USADA revealed a potential anti-doping violation from a sample taken October 15. Beltrán instead faced Joe Soto. He lost the fight via submission in the first round.

Beltrán faced promotional newcomer Deiveson Alcântara in a flyweight bout on June 3, 2017, at UFC 212. He lost the fight via TKO at the end of the second round.

Beltrán faced Matt Schnell on October 7, 2017, at UFC 216. He lost the fight by unanimous decision and was subsequently released from the promotion.

=== LUX Fight League ===
==== LUX Bantamweight Champion ====
After his stint in the UFC, Beltrán signed with LUX Fight League. He made his promotional debut against Erick Ruano Barrera for the Lux Bantamweight Championship at LUX 004 on March 15, 2019. He won the fight via fourth-round technical knockout.

Beltrán then attempted to become a two-division champion in the organization by challenging Diego Lopes at LUX 007 on November 29, 2019. However he lost the fight via first-round submission.

He was then scheduled to make his first Bantamweight title defense against David Mendoza at LUX 009 on July 17, 2020. He retained his title via fourth-round submission.

The pair was pitted against each other in a rematch for the title at LUX 014 on June 25, 2021. Beltrán again retained the title via first-round submission.

Beltrán was expected to defend his belt against Francesco Patron Manzo at LUX 017 on October 15, 2021. However, the fight was later scrapped.

Beltrán faced Rudolfo Rubio on June 17, 2022, at LUX 023. He defended his Bantamweight title and won the bout via unanimous decision.

Beltrán faced Jose Roura on December 9, 2022, at LUX 029, collecting a fourth Bantamweight title defense when he won the bout via unanimous decision.

=== Post-LUX career ===
Beltrán signed with French-based promotion Ares FC, and faced Damien Lapilus for the vacant AFC Featherweight Championship on March 9, 2023, on Ares FC 13, losing the bout in the first round via TKO stoppage.

In 2025, Beltrán announced that he is the new matchmaker of the nascent promotion Mexico Fight League.

Beltrán faced Darko Banović on December 16, 2023, at FNC 14, winning the bout via split decision.

Beltrán is booked to fight for the vacant bantamweight title at Superior Challenge 28 on May 31 in Stockholm, Sweden. He will face Superior Challenge flyweight champion Bartosz Wojcikiewicz in the main event.

== Championships and accomplishments ==
- LUX Fight League
  - LUX Bantamweight Championship (one time)
  - Longest Bantamweight Champion reign in LUX history (1455 days)
  - Longest reign in any division in LUX history (1455 days)

== Mixed martial arts record ==
Professional record breakdown
30 matches	19 wins	10 losses
By knockout	4	2
By submission	11	6
By decision	4	2
No contests	1	

Res.	Record	Opponent	Method	Event	Date	Round	Time	Location	Notes
Loss	19–10 (1)	Rogerio Ferreira Furtado	Submission (rear-naked choke)	WAR MMA 4	November 30, 2024	2	2:26	Madrid, Spain	Featherweight bout.
Loss	19–9 (1)	Daniel Requeijo	Submission (rear-naked choke)	Ansgar Fighting League 34	May 25, 2024	2	2:27	Badalona, Spain	For the vacant AFL Bantamweight Championship.
Loss	19–8 (1)	Darko Banović	Decision (split)	FNC 14	December 16, 2023	3	5:00	Sarajevo, Bosnia and Herzegovina	
NC	19–7 (1)	Damien Lapilus	NC (overturned)	Ares FC 13	March 9, 2023	1	1:38	Paris, France	For the vacant Ares FC Featherweight Championship. Originally a TKO (punches) win for Lapilus; overturned by FMMAF after he tested positive for banned substances.
Win	19–7	Jose Roura	Decision (unanimous)	LUX 029	December 9, 2022	5	5:00	Mexico City, Mexico	Defended the LUX Bantamweight Championship.
Win	18–7	Rodolfo Rubio Perez	Decision (unanimous)	LUX 023	June 17, 2022	5	5:00	Puebla, Mexico	Defended the LUX Bantamweight Championship.
Win	17–7	David Mendoza	Submission (rear-naked choke)	LUX 014	June 25, 2021	1	4:24	Monterrey, Mexico	Defended the LUX Bantamweight Championship.
Win	16–7	David Mendoza	Submission (shoulder choke)	LUX 009	July 17, 2020	4	2:01	Monterrey, Mexico	Defended the LUX Bantamweight Championship.
Loss	15–7	Diego Lopes	Submission (kneebar)	LUX 007	November 29, 2019	1	3:35	Monterrey, Mexico	For the LUX Featherweight Championship.
Win	15–6	Erick Rogelio Ruano Barrera	TKO (punches)	LUX 004	March 15, 2019	4	4:23	Mexico City, Mexico	Return to Bantamweight. Won the LUX Bantamweight Championship.
Loss	14–6	Matt Schnell	Decision (unanimous)	UFC 216	October 7, 2017	3	5:00	Las Vegas, Nevada, United States	
Loss	14–5	Deiveson Figueiredo	TKO (corner stoppage)	UFC 212	June 3, 2017	2	5:00	Rio de Janeiro, Brazil	Flyweight debut.
Loss	14–4	Joe Soto	Submission (heel hook)	The Ultimate Fighter Latin America 3 Finale: dos Anjos vs. Ferguson	November 5, 2016	1	1:37	Mexico City, Mexico	Catchweight (140 lb) bout.
Win	14–3	Reginaldo Vieira	Submission (rear-naked choke)	UFC Fight Night: dos Anjos vs. Alvarez	July 7, 2016	2	3:04	Las Vegas, Nevada, United States	
Win	13–3	Ning Guangyou	Decision (split)	UFC Fight Night: Henderson vs. Masvidal	November 28, 2015	3	5:00	Seoul, South Korea	
Win	12–3	Marlon Vera	Decision (unanimous)	UFC 180	November 15, 2014	3	5:00	Mexico City, Mexico	Return to Bantamweight.
Loss	11–3	Diego Arturo Huerto	TKO (head kick)	World Best Gladiators 1	March 29, 2014	2	N/A	Ciudad Cuauhtémoc, Mexico	For the vacant WBG Lightweight Championship.
Loss	11–2	Rodolfo Rubio Perez	Submission (heel hook)	Mexico FC 1	May 5, 2013	1	N/A	Naucalpan, Mexico	
Loss	11–1	Israel Giron	Submission (armbar)	Xtreme Kombat 15	July 21, 2012	2	4:57	Mexico City, Mexico	
Win	11–0	Ivan Pineda	Submission (rear-naked choke)	Xtreme Kombat 12	May 12, 2012	1	1:15	Mexico City, Mexico	
Win	10–0	Carlos Canada	Submission (armbar)	King Master Fighters 1	March 12, 2012	3	2:35	Uruapan, Mexico	
Win	9–0	Israel Fernandez	TKO (doctor stoppage)	Xtreme Fighters Latino 10	July 28, 2011	1	2:06	Guanajuato, Mexico	Return to Lightweight.
Win	8–0	Jorge Rodriguez	Submission	Faith FC 4	July 7, 2011	1	2:12	Mexico City, Mexico	Featherweight debut.
Win	7–0	Erik Rodriguez	Submission (rear-naked choke)	GEX: Tsunami Fights	May 19, 2011	N/A	N/A	Guadalajara, Mexico	
Win	6–0	Axel Torres	Submission (arm-triangle choke)	Xtreme Fighters Latino 9	September 2, 2010	1	3:43	Mexico City, Mexico	Return to Lightweight.
Win	5–0	Erick Manzanero	Submission (armbar)	Gracie Evolution of Combat 4	November 29, 2009	1	3:19	León, Mexico	
Win	4–0	Greg Guzman	TKO (punches)	Cage of Fire 14	November 15, 2008	1	4:22	Guadalajara, Mexico	Bantamweight debut.
Win	3–0	Josue Silva	TKO (punches)	Gracie Evolution of Combat 3	October 18, 2008	2	1:08	León, Mexico	
Win	2–0	Christian Martinez	Submission (armbar)	Gracie Evolution of Combat 1	August 16, 2008	1	3:01	León, Mexico	
Win	1–0	Jorge Lopez	Submission (rear-naked choke)	Choc Dojo MMA 1	July 26, 2008	1	1:40	Morelia, Mexico	Lightweight debut.

== See also ==
- List of male mixed martial artists
- List of Mexican UFC fighters
