= UFC Fight Night: Hendricks vs. Thompson =

UFC mixed martial arts event in 2016

- The poster for UFC Fight Night: Hendricks vs. Thompson
- Promotion: Ultimate Fighting Championship
- Date: February 6, 2016
- Venue: MGM Grand Garden Arena
- City: Las Vegas, Nevada
- Attendance: 7,422
- Total gate: $1,435,000

Event chronology
UFC on Fox: Johnson vs. Bader	UFC Fight Night: Hendricks vs. Thompson	UFC Fight Night: Cowboy vs. Cowboy

UFC Fight Night: Hendricks vs. Thompson (also known as UFC Fight Night 82) was a mixed martial arts event held on February 6, 2016, at the MGM Grand Garden Arena in Las Vegas, Nevada.

== Background ==
The event was originally billed as UFC 196 and was scheduled to be headlined by a UFC Heavyweight Championship rematch between then-current champion Fabrício Werdum and former two-time champion Cain Velasquez. A series of events eventually led to a main event shuffle: on January 24, 13 days before the event, Velasquez pulled out of the bout due to a back injury and was replaced by Stipe Miocic. On the following day, Werdum announced that he was pulling out of the event due to injury as well as he was not comfortable with the opponent change while dealing with injuries of his own.

With no viable main event options remaining, on January 26 UFC President Dana White announced the company was canceling the pay-per-view broadcast. Therefore, UFC 196 became a Fight Night card. The event aired on Fox Sports 1 and was headlined by a five-round welterweight bout between former UFC Welterweight Champion Johny Hendricks and five-time kickboxing world champion Stephen Thompson. The two were originally scheduled to meet in the co-main event.

A welterweight bout between former WEC Welterweight Champion Mike Pyle and Sean Spencer was originally booked for UFC 187. However, Spencer pulled out due to injury. The fight was later rescheduled for this event.

Mickey Gall, whose first pro bout and subsequent call-out of former WWE Champion CM Punk were featured on UFC Fight Pass' Lookin' for a Fight reality show, faced fellow newcomer Mike Jackson. With his win, Gall was able to secure the matchup with Punk, which eventually took place in September 2016 at UFC 203.

== Results ==
Main Card (Fox Sports 1)
Weight class				Method	Round	Time	Notes
Welterweight	Stephen Thompson	def.	Johny Hendricks	TKO (punches)	1	3:31
Heavyweight	Roy Nelson	def.	Jared Rosholt	Decision (unanimous) (30–27, 30–27, 29–28)	3	5:00
Light Heavyweight	Ovince Saint Preux	def.	Rafael Cavalcante	Decision (unanimous) (30–27, 30–27, 29–28)	3	5:00
Flyweight	Joseph Benavidez	def.	Zach Makovsky	Decision (unanimous) (30–27, 29–28, 29–28)	3	5:00
Light Heavyweight	Misha Cirkunov	def.	Alex Nicholson	Submission (rear-naked choke)	2	1:28
Welterweight	Mike Pyle	def.	Sean Spencer	TKO (elbows and knees)	3	4:25
Preliminary Card (Fox Sports 1)
Lightweight	Josh Burkman	def.	K. J. Noons	Decision (unanimous) (30–27, 30–27, 30–27)	3	5:00
Heavyweight	Derrick Lewis	def.	Damian Grabowski	TKO (punches)	1	2:17
Flyweight	Justin Scoggins	def.	Ray Borg	Decision (unanimous) (30–27, 30–27, 30–26)	3	5:00
Featherweight	Diego Rivas	def.	Noad Lahat	KO (flying knee)	2	0:23
Preliminary Card (UFC Fight Pass)
Welterweight	Mickey Gall	def.	Mike Jackson	Submission (rear-naked choke)	1	0:45
Featherweight	Alex White	def.	Artem Lobov	Decision (unanimous) (30–27, 30–27, 30–27)	3	5:00

== Bonus awards ==
The following fighters were awarded $50,000 bonuses:

- Fight of the Night: Mike Pyle vs. Sean Spencer
- Performance of the Night: Stephen Thompson and Diego Rivas

== Reported payout ==
The following is the reported payout to the fighters as reported to the Nevada State Athletic Commission. It does not include sponsor money and also does not include the UFC's traditional "fight night" bonuses.

- Stephen Thompson: $48,000 (includes $24,000 win bonus) def. Johny Hendricks: $100,000
- Roy Nelson: $125,000 (includes $50,000 win bonus) def. Jared Rosholt: $33,000
- Ovince Saint Preux: $102,000 (includes $51,000 win bonus) def. Rafael Cavalcante: $42,000
- Joseph Benavidez: $118,000 (includes $59,000 win bonus) def. Zach Makovsky: $19,000
- Misha Cirkunov: $24,000 (includes $12,000 win bonus) def. Alex Nicholson: $10,000
- Mike Pyle: $106,000 (includes $53,000 win bonus) def. Sean Spencer: $17,000
- Josh Burkman: $90,000 (includes $45,000 win bonus) def. K. J. Noons: $34,000
- Derrick Lewis: $50,000 (includes $25,000 win bonus) def. Damian Grabowski: $17,000
- Justin Scoggins: $34,000 (includes $17,000 win bonus) def. Ray Borg: $18,000
- Diego Rivas: $20,000 (includes $10,000 win bonus) def. Noad Lahat: $17,000
- Mickey Gall: $20,000 (includes $10,000 win bonus) def. Mike Jackson: $10,000
- Alex White: $24,000 (includes $12,000 win bonus) def. Artem Lobov: $13,000

== See also ==
- List of UFC events
- 2016 in UFC
