= UFC Fight Night: Silva vs. Bisping =

2016 mixed martial arts event

- The poster for UFC Fight Night: Silva vs. Bisping
- Promotion: Ultimate Fighting Championship
- Date: February 27, 2016
- Venue: The O_{2} Arena
- City: London, England
- Attendance: 16,734
- Total gate: $2,000,000

Event chronology
UFC Fight Night: Cowboy vs. Cowboy	UFC Fight Night: Silva vs. Bisping	UFC 196: McGregor vs. Diaz

UFC Fight Night: Silva vs. Bisping (also known as UFC Fight Night 84) was a mixed martial arts event held on February 27, 2016 at The O_{2} Arena in London, England.

== Background ==
The event was the eighth that the promotion hosted in London and the fifth held at The O_{2} Arena.

Michael Bisping was originally expected to face Gegard Mousasi at this event in a non-headliner middleweight bout. However, on 24 December, Mousasi was replaced by former UFC Middleweight Champion Anderson Silva in favour of a main event. Three days later, it was announced that Mousasi would face former title challenger Thales Leites.

Jimi Manuwa was expected to face Nikita Krylov at this event. However, on 31 December, Manuwa pulled out of the bout due to an undisclosed injury and the fight was scrapped.

Henry Briones was expected to face Brad Pickett at the event. However, Briones pulled out of the bout on 22 January and was replaced by Francisco Rivera.

Łukasz Sajewski was expected to face Teemu Packalén at the event. However 16 February, Sajewski pulled out due to an injury and was replaced by promotional newcomer Thibault Gouti.

The event tied UFC 169 and UFC Fight Night: Machida vs. Mousasi for the most decisions at a single UFC event with 10.

== Results ==
Main Card (UFC Fight Pass)
Weight class				Method	Round	Time	Notes
Middleweight	Michael Bisping	def.	Anderson Silva	Decision (unanimous) (48–47, 48–47, 48–47)	5	5:00
Middleweight	Gegard Mousasi	def.	Thales Leites	Decision (unanimous) (30–27, 29–28, 30–27)	3	5:00
Welterweight	Tom Breese	def.	Keita Nakamura	Decision (unanimous) (30–27, 30–27, 29–28)	3	5:00
Bantamweight	Brad Pickett	def.	Francisco Rivera	Decision (split) (29–28, 28–29, 29–28)	3	5:00
Preliminary Card (UFC Fight Pass)
Featherweight	Makwan Amirkhani	def.	Mike Wilkinson	Decision (unanimous) (29–28, 30–27, 29–28)	3	5:00
Bantamweight	Davey Grant	def.	Marlon Vera	Decision (unanimous) (30–26, 30–26, 30–26)	3	5:00	(Note: Vera was deducted one point in round 3 for repeatedly grabbing the inside of Grant's glove.)
Middleweight	Scott Askham	def.	Chris Dempsey	KO (punch and head kick)	1	4:45
Featherweight	Arnold Allen	def.	Yaotzin Meza	Decision (unanimous) (30–27, 30–27, 30–27)	3	5:00
Middleweight	Krzysztof Jotko	def.	Brad Scott	Decision (unanimous) (29–28, 30–27, 29–28)	3	5:00
Lightweight	Rustam Khabilov	def.	Norman Parke	Decision (unanimous) (29–28, 29–28, 29–28)	3	5:00
Heavyweight	Daniel Omielańczuk	def.	Jarjis Danho	Technical Decision (majority) (29–29, 29–28, 29–28)	3	1:31	(Note: Fight was stopped in the 3rd round after a groin strike rendered Danho unable to continue.)
Lightweight	Teemu Packalén	def.	Thibault Gouti	Submission (rear-naked choke)	1	0:24
Lightweight	David Teymur	def.	Martin Svensson	TKO (head kick and punches)	2	1:26

== Bonus awards ==
The following fighters were awarded $50,000 bonuses:

- Fight of the Night: Michael Bisping vs. Anderson Silva
- Performance of the Night: Scott Askham and Teemu Packalén

== See also ==
- List of UFC events
- 2016 in UFC
