= UFC Fight Night: Jędrzejczyk vs. Penne =

UFC mixed martial arts event in 2015

- The poster for UFC Fight Night: Jędrzejczyk vs. Penne
- Promotion: Ultimate Fighting Championship
- Date: June 20, 2015
- Venue: O_{2} World
- City: Berlin, Germany
- Attendance: 8,155

Event chronology
UFC 188: Velasquez vs. Werdum	UFC Fight Night: Jędrzejczyk vs. Penne	UFC Fight Night: Machida vs. Romero

UFC Fight Night: Jędrzejczyk vs. Penne (also known as UFC Fight Night 69) was a mixed martial arts event held on June 20, 2015, at O_{2} World in Berlin, Germany.

== Background ==
The event was expected to be headlined by a light heavyweight bout between former title challengers Alexander Gustafsson and Glover Teixeira. However, Gustafsson pulled out of the bout on May 1 due to an injury. In turn, Teixeira was removed from the card entirely and was rescheduled to face Ovince Saint Preux on August 8, 2015, at UFC Fight Night 73. Subsequently, a UFC Women's Strawweight Championship bout between current champion Joanna Jędrzejczyk and former Invicta FC Atomweight champion Jessica Penne was announced as the new event headliner.

Makwan Amirkhani was expected to face Diego Rivas at the event. However, shortly after the bout was announced, Rivas was pulled from the fight due to undisclosed reasons. Amirkhani remained on the card to face Masio Fullen.

A welterweight bout between Sérgio Moraes and Peter Sobotta was originally booked for UFC Fight Night 64. However, the bout was cancelled due to Sobotta being injured. Moraes remained on the card against a different opponent. The fight was later rescheduled for this event. On June 9, the fight was scrapped once again as Moraes pulled out for undisclosed reasons. He was replaced by promotional newcomer Steve Kennedy.

A light heavyweight bout between Nikita Krylov and Marcos Rogério de Lima was briefly linked to this event. However the pairing was moved a week later to UFC Fight Night 70.

Derek Brunson was expected to face Krzysztof Jotko at the event. However, Brunson pulled out of the fight on June 9 citing a rib injury and was briefly replaced by Uriah Hall. Three days after the booking, Hall was removed due to an alleged visa issue. In turn, Jotko was removed from the card entirely.

Mike Wilkinson was expected to face Alan Omer at the event. However, Wilkinson suffered a shoulder injury and was removed from the card. Wilkinson was replaced by promotional newcomer Arnold Allen.

== Results ==
Main Card (UFC Fight Pass)
Weight class				Method	Round	Time	Notes
Women's Strawweight	Joanna Jędrzejczyk (c)	def.	Jessica Penne	TKO (punches and knee)	3	4:22	(Note: For the UFC Women's Strawweight Championship.)
Featherweight	Tatsuya Kawajiri	def.	Dennis Siver	Decision (unanimous) (29–28, 29–28, 29–28)	3	5:00
Welterweight	Peter Sobotta	def.	Steve Kennedy	Submission (rear-naked choke)	1	2:57
Lightweight	Nick Hein	def.	Łukasz Sajewski	Decision (unanimous) (30–27, 30–27, 30–27)	3	5:00
Preliminary Card (UFC Fight Pass)
Featherweight	Makwan Amirkhani	def.	Masio Fullen	Submission (rear-naked choke)	1	1:41
Lightweight	Mairbek Taisumov	def.	Alan Patrick	TKO (head kick and punches)	2	1:30
Featherweight	Arnold Allen	def.	Alan Omer	Submission (guillotine choke)	3	1:41
Featherweight	Noad Lahat	def.	Niklas Bäckström	Decision (majority) (28–28, 29–28, 29–28)	3	5:00
Middleweight	Scott Askham	def.	Antônio dos Santos Jr.	TKO (punches and knees)	1	2:52
Lightweight	Magomed Mustafaev	def.	Piotr Hallmann	TKO (doctor stoppage)	2	3:24
Bantamweight	Taylor Lapilus	def.	Ulka Sasaki	TKO (punches)	2	1:26

== Bonus awards ==
The following fighters were awarded $50,000 bonuses:

- Fight of the Night: Joanna Jędrzejczyk vs. Jessica Penne
- Performance of the Night: Mairbek Taisumov and Arnold Allen

== See also ==
- List of UFC events
- 2015 in UFC
