= The Ultimate Fighter: Latin America =

UFC mixed martial arts television series and event in 2014

- Genre: Reality, Sports
- Created by: Frank Fertitta III, Lorenzo Fertitta, Dana White
- Starring: Dana White, Cain Velasquez, and Fabricio Werdum
- Country of origin: United States

Production
- Running time: 60 minutes

Original release
- Network: Televisa, UFC Fight Pass
- Release: August 20, 2014

The Ultimate Fighter: Latin America (also known as The Ultimate Fighter: Team Velasquez vs. Team Werdum) is an installment of the Ultimate Fighting Championship (UFC)-produced reality television series The Ultimate Fighter. It is the seventh series to be produced primarily for markets outside the United States.

The series was preceded by the launch of UFC's Latin America developmental program in late 2012, where the organization scouted for Hispanic talent. Many of the prospects that were picked from the tryouts spent the following year training in coveted camps — mainly Jackson's MMA — with all expenses paid alongside of $1,200 monthly stipend. Most of them eventually appeared in the first two seasons of the Latin America installment, Yair Rodríguez, Guido Cannetti and Marlon Vera among others.

The series was officially announced by the UFC in April 2014, shortly after Fabrício Werdum defeated Travis Browne to earn a title shot against Cain Velasquez. The coaches will be Velasquez and number-one contender Werdum and the series will culminate with their bout at UFC 180 on November 15, 2014, at Arena Ciudad de México in Mexico City. This season will feature eight featherweight and eight bantamweight competitors, four in each class representing Mexico and Latin America (not including fighters from Brazil, which has its own TUF). Filming began in May 2014 in Las Vegas, Nevada, with the series scheduled to debut in August 2014.

In May 2014, the cast of fighters participating on the show was announced. Eight fighters were chosen for both Team Velasquez and Team Werdum to represent Mexico and Latin America, respectively.

== Cast ==
=== Coaches ===
Team Velasquez

- Cain Velasquez, Head Coach
- Daniel "DC" Cormier
- Leandro Vieira
- Javier Mendez
- Luke Rockhold

Team Werdum

- Fabrício Werdum, Head Coach
- Rafael Cordeiro
- Victor Davila
- Kenny Johnson

=== Fighters ===
- Team Velasquez (Mexico)
  - Bantamweights: Enrique Briones, José Alberto Quiñónez, Alejandro Pérez, and Marco Beltrán.
  - Featherweights: Gabriel Benítez, Yair Rodríguez, Rodolfo Rubio, and Masio Fullen.
- Team Werdum (Latin America)
  - Bantamweights: Marlon Vera, Bentley Syler, Guido Cannetti, Fredy Serrano.
  - Featherweights: Alexander Torres, Diego Rivas, Leonardo Morales, Humberto Brown.

== Episodes ==
Episode 1 (August 20, 2014)

- The 16 fighters are divided in two teams: a Mexican team coached by Cain Velasquez and a Latin American team coached by Fabrício Werdum, featuring fighters from many countries of Latin America. The team is composed of Vera, from Ecuador; Syler, Bolivia; Cannetti, Argentina; Serrano and Torres, Colombia; Rivas, Chile; Morales, Nicaragua and Brown, Panama.
- Velasquez wins the toss coin and gets the first fight pick. He announces later that Mexican José Alberto Quiñónez will face Bolivia's Bentley Syler.
- José Alberto Quiñónez defeated Bentley Syler via TKO (punches) in round 1.
- The next fight is announced: Gabriel Benítez vs. Diego Rivas.

Episode 2 (August 27, 2014)

- Gabriel Benítez defeated Diego Rivas via submission (rear-naked choke) in round 2.
- On the post-fight interview, Benítez mention that he decided to use his submission moves during the fight after he heard that Marlon Vera was screaming that he did not have any ground game.
- The next fight is announced: Alejandro Pérez vs. Freddy Serrano.

Episode 3 (September 3, 2014)

- Alejandro Pérez defeated Fredy Serrano via unanimous decision after three rounds.
- Team Werdum does not accept the verdict of the judges and argues with Team Velasquez.
- The next fight is announced: Yair Rodríguez vs. Humberto Brown.

Episode 4 (September 10, 2014)

- Yair Rodríguez defeated Humberto Brown via submission (triangle) in round 2.
- The next fight is announced: Enrique Briones vs. Marlon Vera.

Episode 5 (September 17, 2014)

- Marlon Vera defeated Enrique Briones via KO (upkick) in round 2.
- Briones was dominating the fight, but Vera threw an upkick while he was lying on the floor that hit Briones' jaw, ending the fight by KO.
- The next fight is announced: Alexander Torres vs. Rodolfo Rubio.

Episode 6 (September 24, 2014)

- Rodolfo Rubio defeated Alexander Torres via submission (armbar) in round 2.
- The next fight is announced: Marco Beltrán vs. Guido Canneti.

Episode 7 (October 1, 2014)

- Marco Beltrán defeated Guido Cannetti via majority decision after two rounds.
- There are controversy around Cannetti's kick to the head while Beltrán was on the floor on round 1. Cannetti denies kicking the head of Beltrán, saying that the kick was to the body.
- However, the replay shows clearly the impact of the kick on Beltrán's head. The referee deducts one point to Cannetti.
- Team Werdum does not accept the decision of the judges.
- The next fight is announced: Masiosare Fullen vs. Leonardo Morales.

Episode 8 (October 8, 2014)

- Guido Cannetti shows his disagreement about the decision of the judges in his fight against Beltrán.
- Leonardo Morales defeated Masiosare Fullen via KO (kick) in round 2.
- The next fight is announced: Yair Rodríguez vs. Rodolfo Rubio.

Episode 9 (October 15, 2014)

- Both teams agree to bet the cleaning duties of the kitchen on the Coaches' Challenge.
- Fabrício Werdum wins the Coaches' Challenge.
- Guido Cannetti reasserts his claims that he won the fight against Beltrán
- Yair Rodríguez defeated Rodolfo Rubio via verbal submission (kicks and punches) in round 1.
- The next fight is announced: Alejandro Pérez vs. Marlon Vera.
- Marlon Vera has a skin infection and Guido Canetti will probably become his replacement.

Episode 10 (October 22, 2014)

- Cannetti confronts Marco Beltrán about the decision of the judges in their fight.
- Marlon Vera is replaced by Cannetti due skin infection.
- White promised a place at the UFC 180 to Vera.
- Vera tells Cannetti to be humble, and remembers when Cannetti promised to retire from MMA if he loses to Beltrán.
- Alejandro Pérez defeated Guido Cannetti via KO (punches) in round 1.
- Guido Cannetti left the building on ambulance, showing the effects of the KO.
- The next fight is announced: José Alberto Quiñonez against Beltrán.

Episode 11 (October 29, 2014)

- Cannetti accepted his mistakes during the fight
- José Alberto Quiñónez defeated Marco Beltrán via unanimous decision in round 3.

Episode 12 (November 5, 2014)

- White tells Marlon Vera that the UFC will pay for the operation of his daughter, who suffers from a rare neurological disorder (Moebius syndrome).
- Leonardo Morales defeated Gabriel Benítez via unanimous decision in round 3.

== Tournament Bracket ==
=== Bantamweight Bracket ===
Elimination Round
Alejandro Pérez	UD
Fredy Serrano	3
Enrique Briones	2
Marlon Vera	KO
José Alberto Quiñónez	TKO
Bentley Syler	1
Marco Beltrán	MD
Guido Cannetti	2

Semi-finals
Alejandro Pérez	KO
Guido Cannetti*	1
José Alberto Quiñónez	UD
Marco Beltrán	3

Finale
Alejandro Pérez	UD
José Alberto Quiñónez	3

* Vera had a skin infection and was replaced by Cannetti.

=== Featherweight Bracket ===
Elimination Round
Rodolfo Rubio	SUB
Alexander Torres	2
Yair Rodríguez	SUB
Humberto Brown	2
Gabriel Benítez	SUB
Diego Rivas	2
Masiosare Fullen	2
Leonardo Morales	KO

Semi-finals
Rodolfo Rubio	1
Yair Rodríguez	SUB
Gabriel Benítez	3
Leonardo Morales	UD

Finale
Yair Rodríguez	UD
Leonardo Morales	3

Legend
	Team Velasquez
	Team Werdum
UD	Unanimous Decision
SD	Split Decision
SUB	Submission
(T)KO	(Technical) Knockout

== Finale ==
The finale for the event took place on November 15, 2014, at UFC 180. The event was expected to be headlined by a UFC Heavyweight Championship bout between the current champion Cain Velasquez and top contender Fabrício Werdum. However, on October 21, it was announced that Velasquez was forced to pull out of the bout due to an injured knee and was replaced by Mark Hunt. That also changed the originally planned title fight into an interim title bout.

== See also ==
- The Ultimate Fighter
