= Carlos Rivas =

Carlos Rivas may refer to:

- Carlos Rivas (actor) (1925–2003), American actor
- Carlos Rivas (footballer, born 1953), Chilean football midfielder
- Carlos Rivas Godoy (born 1985), Canadian soccer player; son of the Chilean Carlos Rivas
- Carlos Rivas (footballer, born 1991), Colombian football winger
- Carlos Rivas (footballer, born 1994), Colombian football forward
- Carlos Rivas Quiñones (active from 2013), Puerto Rican attorney and economist
