= Marlon Vera =

Ecuadorian mixed martial artist (born 1992)

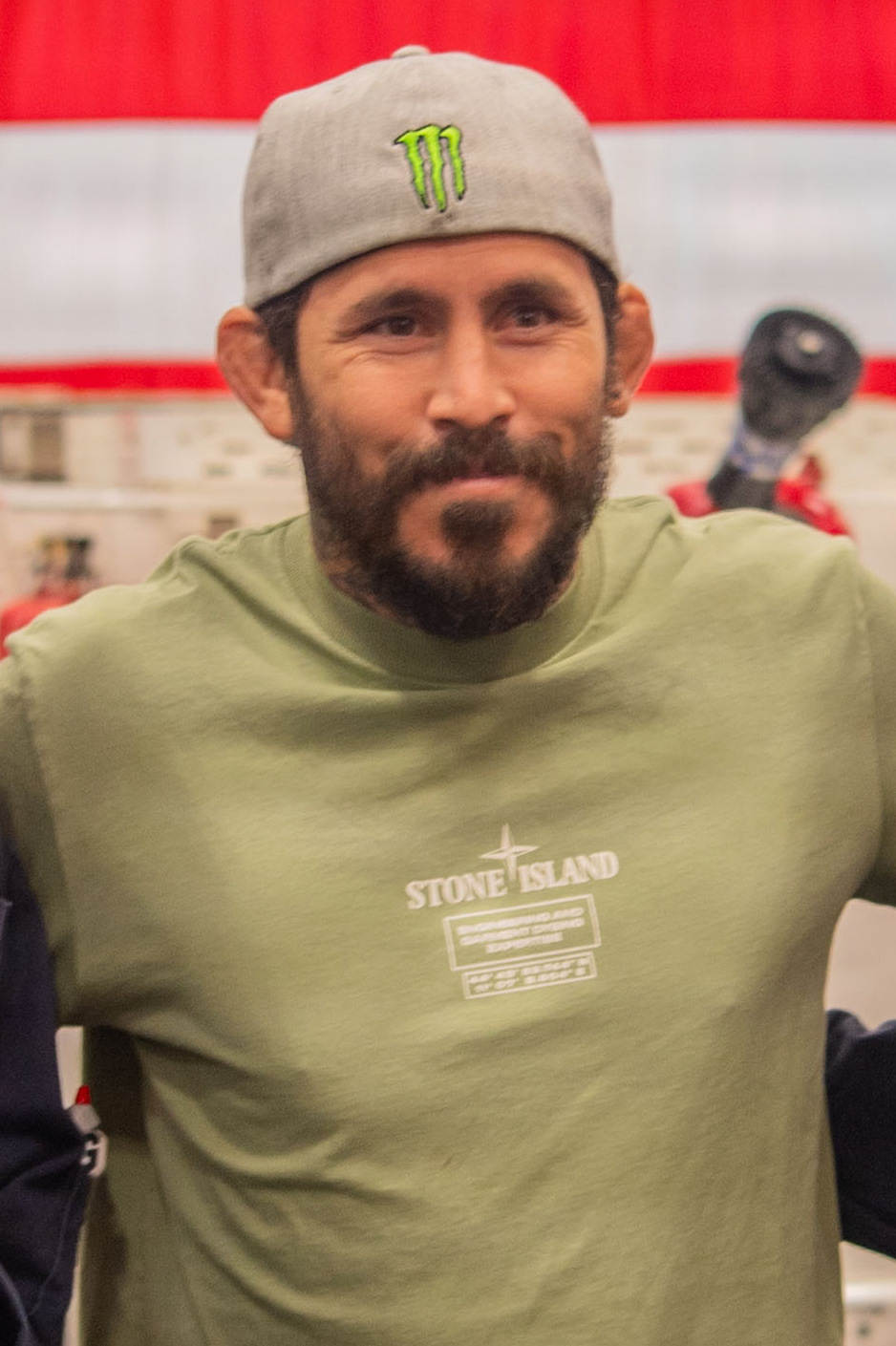
- Vera in 2026
- Born: Marlon Andrés Vera Delgado; December 2, 1992 (age 33); Chone, Manabí, Ecuador
- Nickname: Chito
- Height: 5 ft 8 in (173 cm)
- Weight: 136 lb (62 kg; 9 st 10 lb)
- Division: Bantamweight (2010–present); Featherweight (2016, 2020)
- Reach: 70 1/2 in (179 cm)
- Fighting out of: Chone, Ecuador
- Team: Team Oyama (2016–2021); RVCA Training Center (2018–2026); 10th Planet Jui Jitsu Las Vegas (2026–present)
- Trainer: Jason Parillo
- Rank: Black belt in Brazilian Jiu-Jitsu
- Years active: 2011–present

Mixed martial arts record
- Total: 37
- Wins: 24
- By knockout: 9
- By submission: 10
- By decision: 5
- Losses: 12
- By decision: 12
- Draws: 1

Other information
- Mixed martial arts record from Sherdog

Marlon Andrés Vera Delgado (born December 2, 1992), also known by his nickname “Chito Vera”, is an Ecuadorian professional mixed martial artist who currently competes in the Bantamweight division of the Ultimate Fighting Championship (UFC). Vera holds numerous records in the UFC bantamweight division including most finishes (11), most knockdowns (14), most bouts (24), most total fight time, most submission attempts (16) and is tied for most wins (14) and most knockouts (7). As of October 17, 2026, he is #14 in the Meta UFC bantamweight rankings.

== Background ==
Vera was born into a middle-class family in Chone, Ecuador. He has an older sister and brother. Causing ruckus and getting into street fights throughout his youth, Vera started training in Brazilian jiu-jitsu in his newly adopted hometown of Guayaquil at the age of 16.

== Mixed martial arts career ==
=== Early career ===
Vera began training as an amateur in 2011 and made his professional debut in February 2012. He compiled a record of 8–1–1, competing for regional promotions in Latin America before trying out for The Ultimate Fighter in 2014.

=== The Ultimate Fighter: Latin America ===
In May 2014, it was revealed that Vera was a cast member of The Ultimate Fighter: Latin America, competing for Team Werdum.

Over the course of the show, Vera first defeated Henry Briones in the quarterfinals via knockout. Subsequently, Vera was forced out of his semi-final bout with a skin infection and was replaced by Guido Cannetti.

=== Ultimate Fighting Championship ===
Vera made his official debut against fellow castmate Marco Beltrán on November 15, 2014, at UFC 180. He lost the fight via unanimous decision.

For his next bout, Vera faced Roman Salazar on August 8, 2015, at UFC Fight Night 73. He won the fight via submission in the second round. He also earned a Performance of the Night bonus.

Vera faced Davey Grant on February 27, 2016, at UFC Fight Night 84. Vera lost the fight via unanimous decision.

Vera was expected to face Ning Guangyou on August 20, 2016, at UFC 202. Subsequently, on August 9, 2016, it was revealed that Guangyou had tested positive for trace amounts of clenbuterol in relation to an out-of-competition drug test taken on May 19. Guangyou was cleared of wrongdoing after it was determined by USADA that he had possibly ingested tainted meat from China. As a result, he was not punished. The bout was rescheduled and expected to take place the following week at UFC on Fox 21. In turn, the bout was postponed again due to alleged visa issues for Guangyou, which restricted the timing of his travel. The pairing eventually took place at featherweight on November 27, 2016, at UFC Fight Night 101. He won the fight via unanimous decision.

Vera was briefly tabbed as a short notice replacement to face Jimmie Rivera on January 15, 2017. However, Rivera declined the fight and the pairing was scrapped.

Vera was an injury replacement for Henry Briones to face Brad Pickett on March 18, 2017, at UFC Fight Night 107. Due to the short notice and preparation for Vera, the bout was contested at a catchweight of 140 lbs. He won the fight via TKO in the third round for which he was awarded a Performance of the Night bonus.

Vera faced Brian Kelleher on July 22, 2017, at UFC on Fox 25. He won the fight via submission in the first round.

Vera faced John Lineker on October 28, 2017, at UFC Fight Night 119. He lost the fight via unanimous decision.

Vera faced Douglas Silva de Andrade on February 3, 2018, at UFC Fight Night 125. He lost the fight via unanimous decision.

Vera faced Wuliji Buren on August 8, 2018, at UFC 227. He won the fight via TKO in the second round.

Vera faced Guido Cannetti on November 17, 2018, at UFC Fight Night 140. He won the fight via a rear-naked choke in round two.

Vera was expected to face Thomas Almeida on March 2, 2019, at UFC 235. However Almeida pulled out of the fight on January 31, citing an injury, and was replaced by Frankie Saenz. In turn, Vera pulled out of the fight on February 27 due to illness and the bout was scrapped from the event. The bout was rescheduled to UFC Fight Night 148. Vera won the fight via technical knockout in round one.

Vera was scheduled to face Sean O'Malley on July 6, 2019, at UFC 239. However, O'Malley announced his withdraw from the bout on June 21, 2019, due a failed test for ostarine. O'Malley was replaced by newcomer Nohelin Hernandez. Vera won the fight via a rear-naked choke in round two.

Vera faced Andre Ewell on October 12, 2019, at UFC Fight Night 161. He won the fight via technical knockout. This win earned him the Performance of the Night bonus award.

Vera was scheduled to face Jimmie Rivera on February 8, 2020, at UFC 247. However, Rivera pulled out of the fight on January 23 citing an injury. In turn, promotion officials elected to remove Vera from the card.

Vera was expected to face Eddie Wineland on March 28, 2020, at UFC on ESPN: Ngannou vs. Rozenstruik. However, the event was cancelled due to the COVID-19 pandemic. Instead, Vera faced Song Yadong in a featherweight bout on May 16, 2020, at UFC on ESPN 8. He lost the fight via unanimous decision. Both participants earned the Fight of the Night award.

Vera faced Sean O'Malley on August 15, 2020, at UFC 252. Vera defeated O'Malley via first-round TKO. Vera finished O'Malley with a flurry of strikes after dropping him with a calf kick.

Vera faced José Aldo on December 19, 2020, at UFC Fight Night: Thompson vs Neal. He lost the fight via unanimous decision.

A rematch of Vera's 2016 bout with Davey Grant took place on June 19, 2021, at UFC on ESPN 25. Vera won the bout this time via unanimous decision. The bout earned both fighters the Fight of the Night award.

Vera faced Frankie Edgar on November 6, 2021, at UFC 268. Vera won the fight via front kick knockout in round three. This win earned him the Performance of the Night award.

Vera faced Rob Font on April 30, 2022, at UFC on ESPN 35. At the weigh-ins, Font weighed in at 138.5 pounds, two and half pounds over the bantamweight non-title fight limit. The bout proceeded at a catchweight with Font forfeiting 20% of his purse to Vera. Vera won the bout via unanimous decision. This fight earned him the Fight of the Night award and also Font's bonus due to his weight miss.

Vera faced Dominick Cruz on August 13, 2022, at UFC on ESPN 41. Vera won the fight via knockout in the fourth round. This win earned him the Performance of the Night award.

Vera was scheduled to face Cory Sandhagen on February 18, 2023, at UFC Fight Night 219. However, the bout was moved to UFC on ESPN 43 on March 25 for undisclosed reasons. Vera lost the fight via split decision. Though one judge scored the bout for Vera, 24 out of 24 media outlets scored the bout for Sandhagen.

Vera was scheduled to face former UFC Flyweight and Bantamweight Champion Henry Cejudo on August 19, 2023, at UFC 292. However, Cejudo withdrew in late June due to a shoulder injury, and was replaced by Pedro Munhoz. Vera won the fight by unanimous decision. 14 out of 17 media outlets scored the bout for Munhoz.

Vera faced Sean O'Malley in a rematch for the UFC Bantamweight Championship on March 9, 2024, at UFC 299. He lost the bout by unanimous decision.

Vera faced former UFC Flyweight Champion Deiveson Figueiredo on August 3, 2024, at UFC on ABC 7. He lost the fight by unanimous decision after getting knocked down for the first time in his UFC career.

Vera was scheduled to face Mario Bautista on May 3, 2025, at UFC Fight Night 256. However, for unknown reasons, the bout was moved to UFC 316 and was scheduled to take place on June 7, 2025. In turn, Vera withdrew for unknown reasons and was replaced by promotional newcomer Patchy Mix.

Vera faced Aiemann Zahabi on October 18, 2025, at UFC Fight Night 262. He lost the fight by split decision.

Vera faced David Martínez on February 28, 2026, at UFC Fight Night 268. He lost the fight by unanimous decision.

Vera was scheduled to face Charles Jourdain on July 18, 2026, at UFC Fight Night 281. However, for unknown reasons, the bout was moved to UFC 331 on September 19, 2026. Vera won the fight by technical knockout in the third round.

== Submission grappling career ==
Vera faced Jean Silva in a submission grappling match at Hype FC Brazil: São Paulo on April 8, 2026. The bout ended in a draw.

== Personal life ==
Vera is married to María Paulina Escobar. They have two daughters, born in 2011 and 2018, and a son, born in 2015. His eldest daughter has a rare neurological condition Möbius syndrome, for which Vera created a GoFundMe account. In June 2018, Vera announced that they had raised sufficient donations for a surgery, which was planned to take place in California during the summer of 2018.

In 2017, Vera signed an advertisement deal with Pepsi through which his fans will see him on billboards all across his home country.

== Championships & accomplishments ==
=== Mixed martial arts ===
- Ultimate Fighting Championship
  - Performance of the Night (Five times) vs. Roman Salazar, Brad Pickett, Andre Ewell, Frankie Edgar, and Dominick Cruz
  - Fight of the Night (Three times) vs. Song Yadong, Davey Grant, and Rob Font
    - Tied (Rob Font, Davey Grant & Song Yadong) for fourth most Post-Fight bonuses in UFC Bantamweight division history (6)
  - Most finishes in UFC Bantamweight division history (11)
  - Tied (Montel Jackson) for most knockdowns in UFC Bantamweight division history (14)
    - Tied (Edson Barboza) for fourth most knockdowns in UFC history (16)
  - Most bouts in UFC Bantamweight division history (24)
    - Most decision bouts in UFC Bantamweight division history (15)
  - Most total fight time in UFC Bantamweight division history (5:21:53)
  - Tied (Aljamain Sterling) for most wins in UFC Bantamweight division history (14)
    - Tied (Dominick Cruz & Aljamain Sterling) for most wins in UFC/WEC Bantamweight division history (14)
  - Tied (Sean O'Malley & T.J. Dillashaw) for most knockouts in UFC Bantamweight division history (7)
  - Most submission attempts in UFC Bantamweight division history (16)
  - Tied (Kyung Ho Kang, Mario Bautista & Aljamain Sterling) for third most submissions in UFC Bantamweight division history (4)
  - Fourth most significant strikes landed in UFC Bantamweight division history (1357)
    - Fourth most total strikes landed in UFC Bantamweight division history (1555)
  - First and only fighter to land three knockdowns in three separate UFC bouts (vs. Rob Font, Dominick Cruz & Charles Jourdain)
  - Holds wins over three former UFC champions — Sean O'Malley 1, Frankie Edgar and Dominick Cruz
  - UFC Honors Awards
    - 2022: President's Choice Performance of the Year Nominee vs. Rob Font
  - UFC.com Awards
    - 2020: Ranked #6 Upset of the Year vs. Sean O'Malley 1
    - 2022: Ranked #6 Fighter of the Year & Ranked #5 Knockout of the Year vs. Dominick Cruz
- ESPN
  - 2022 Most Improved Fighter of the Year
- MMA Fighting
  - 2022 First Team MMA All-Star

== Mixed martial arts record ==
Professional record breakdown
37 matches	24 wins	12 losses
By knockout	9	0
By submission	10	0
By decision	5	12
Draws	1	

Res.	Record	Opponent	Method	Event	Date	Round	Time	Location	Notes
Win	24–12–1	Charles Jourdain	TKO (submission to punch)	UFC 331	September 19, 2026	3	2:02	Los Angeles, California, United States	
Loss	23–12–1	David Martínez	Decision (unanimous)	UFC Fight Night: Moreno vs. Kavanagh	February 28, 2026	3	5:00	Mexico City, Mexico	
Loss	23–11–1	Aiemann Zahabi	Decision (split)	UFC Fight Night: de Ridder vs. Allen	October 18, 2025	3	5:00	Vancouver, British Columbia, Canada	
Loss	23–10–1	Deiveson Figueiredo	Decision (unanimous)	UFC on ABC: Sandhagen vs. Nurmagomedov	August 3, 2024	3	5:00	Abu Dhabi, United Arab Emirates	
Loss	23–9–1	Sean O'Malley	Decision (unanimous)	UFC 299	March 9, 2024	5	5:00	Miami, Florida, United States	For the UFC Bantamweight Championship.
Win	23–8–1	Pedro Munhoz	Decision (unanimous)	UFC 292	August 19, 2023	3	5:00	Boston, Massachusetts, United States	
Loss	22–8–1	Cory Sandhagen	Decision (split)	UFC on ESPN: Vera vs. Sandhagen	March 25, 2023	5	5:00	San Antonio, Texas, United States	
Win	22–7–1	Dominick Cruz	KO (head kick)	UFC on ESPN: Vera vs. Cruz	August 13, 2022	4	2:17	San Diego, California, United States	Performance of the Night.
Win	21–7–1	Rob Font	Decision (unanimous)	UFC on ESPN: Font vs. Vera	April 30, 2022	5	5:00	Las Vegas, Nevada, United States	Catchweight (138.5 lb) bout; Font missed weight. Fight of the Night.
Win	20–7–1	Frankie Edgar	KO (front kick)	UFC 268	November 6, 2021	3	3:50	New York City, New York, United States	Performance of the Night.
Win	19–7–1	Davey Grant	Decision (unanimous)	UFC on ESPN: The Korean Zombie vs. Ige	June 19, 2021	3	5:00	Las Vegas, Nevada, United States	Fight of the Night.
Loss	18–7–1	José Aldo	Decision (unanimous)	UFC Fight Night: Thompson vs. Neal	December 19, 2020	3	5:00	Las Vegas, Nevada, United States	
Win	18–6–1	Sean O'Malley	TKO (elbows and punches)	UFC 252	August 15, 2020	1	4:40	Las Vegas, Nevada, United States	
Loss	17–6–1	Song Yadong	Decision (unanimous)	UFC on ESPN: Overeem vs. Harris	May 16, 2020	3	5:00	Jacksonville, Florida, United States	Featherweight bout. Fight of the Night.
Win	17–5–1	Andre Ewell	TKO (elbows and punches)	UFC Fight Night: Joanna vs. Waterson	October 12, 2019	3	3:17	Tampa, Florida, United States	Performance of the Night.
Win	16–5–1	Nohelin Hernandez	Submission (rear-naked choke)	UFC 239	July 6, 2019	2	3:25	Las Vegas, Nevada, United States	
Win	15–5–1	Frankie Saenz	TKO (punches)	UFC Fight Night: Thompson vs. Pettis	March 23, 2019	1	1:25	Nashville, Tennessee, United States	
Win	14–5–1	Guido Cannetti	Submission (rear-naked choke)	UFC Fight Night: Magny vs. Ponzinibbio	November 17, 2018	2	1:31	Buenos Aires, Argentina	
Win	13–5–1	Wuliji Buren	TKO (body punch)	UFC 227	August 4, 2018	2	4:53	Los Angeles, California, United States	
Loss	12–5–1	Douglas Silva de Andrade	Decision (unanimous)	UFC Fight Night: Machida vs. Anders	February 3, 2018	3	5:00	Belém, Brazil	
Loss	12–4–1	John Lineker	Decision (unanimous)	UFC Fight Night: Brunson vs. Machida	October 28, 2017	3	5:00	São Paulo, Brazil	
Win	12–3–1	Brian Kelleher	Submission (armbar)	UFC on Fox: Weidman vs. Gastelum	July 22, 2017	1	2:18	Uniondale, New York, United States	
Win	11–3–1	Brad Pickett	TKO (head kick and punches)	UFC Fight Night: Manuwa vs. Anderson	March 18, 2017	3	3:50	London, England	Catchweight (140 lb) bout. Performance of the Night.
Win	10–3–1	Ning Guangyou	Decision (unanimous)	UFC Fight Night: Whittaker vs. Brunson	November 27, 2016	3	5:00	Melbourne, Australia	Featherweight bout.
Loss	9–3–1	Davey Grant	Decision (unanimous)	UFC Fight Night: Silva vs. Bisping	February 27, 2016	3	5:00	London, England	Vera was deducted a point in round 3 due to grabbing the inside of Grant's glove.
Win	9–2–1	Roman Salazar	Submission (triangle armbar)	UFC Fight Night: Teixeira vs. Saint Preux	August 8, 2015	2	2:15	Nashville, Tennessee, United States	Performance of the Night.
Loss	8–2–1	Marco Beltrán	Decision (unanimous)	UFC 180	November 15, 2014	3	5:00	Mexico City, Mexico	
Win	8–1–1	D'Juan Owens	Submission (heel hook)	Inka 24	October 23, 2013	1	1:54	Lima, Peru	
Loss	7–1–1	Bruno Leandro Lobato	Decision (unanimous)	Inka 23	August 24, 2013	3	5:00	Lima, Peru	
Draw	7–0–1	Fábio Bispo	Draw (unanimous)	Inka 22	June 29, 2013	3	5:00	Lima, Peru	
Win	7–0	Luis Roberto Herrera	Submission (rear-naked choke)	Mexican Fighters Promotions 16	May 25, 2013	1	1:50	Chihuahua City, Mexico	
Win	6–0	Joel Iglesias	KO (elbows)	300 Sparta 1	April 24, 2013	1	4:04	Lima, Peru	
Win	5–0	Javier Umana Munoz	Submission (triangle choke)	Ultimate Combat Challenge 13	January 18, 2013	2	4:44	Panama City, Panama	
Win	4–0	Alexis Patino Pinos	Submission (armbar)	Punisher Machala 4	May 26, 2012	1	4:00	Guayaquil, Ecuador	
Win	3–0	Jack Guzman	Submission (triangle choke)	Samurai FC 7	February 20, 2012	1	N/A	Quito, Ecuador	
Win	2–0	Cesar Moreno	Decision (unanimous)	Extreme FC 2	June 18, 2011	3	5:00	Santa Elena, Ecuador	
Win	1–0	Romel Orosco	Submission (armbar)	Quito Fight Club 3	July 24, 2010	2	1:12	Guayaquil, Ecuador	

== Mixed martial arts exhibition record ==
Exhibition record breakdown		
1 match	1 win	0 losses
By knockout	1	0

Res.	Record	Opponent	Method	Event	Date	Round	Time	Location	Notes
Win	1–0	Henry Briones	KO (upkick)	The Ultimate Fighter: Latin America	Sep 17, 2014 (airdate)	2	N/A	Las Vegas, Nevada, United States	The Ultimate Fighter: Latin America Elimination round. Later withdrew from tournament.

== Pay-per-view bouts ==
No	Event	Fight	Date	Venue	City	PPV buys
1.	UFC 299	O'Malley vs. Vera 2	March 9, 2024	Kaseya Center	Miami, Florida, United States	Not Disclosed

== See also ==
- List of current UFC fighters
- List of male mixed martial artists
