= Diego Rivas (fighter) =

Chilean mixed martial arts fighter

- Born: November 11, 1991 (age 34); Cholchol, Temuco, Chile
- Other names: Pitbull
- Height: 5 ft 9 in (1.75 m)
- Weight: 145 lb (66 kg; 10.4 st)
- Division: Featherweight; Bantamweight
- Reach: 69 in (175 cm)
- Team: Elemental Dojo
- Rank: Purple belt in Brazilian Jiu-Jitsu
- Years active: 2011–2019 (MMA); 2019–present (Boxing)

Professional boxing record
- Total: 2
- Wins: 2
- By knockout: 1

Mixed martial arts record
- Total: 9
- Wins: 7
- By knockout: 2
- By submission: 3
- By decision: 2
- Losses: 2
- By decision: 2

Other information
- Boxing record from BoxRec
- Mixed martial arts record from Sherdog

Diego Andrés Rivas Figueroa (born November 11, 1991) is a Chilean professional boxer and mixed martial artist. As a mixed martial artist, he competed in the bantamweight and featherweight divisions of the Ultimate Fighting Championship (UFC). He currently competes in boxing in the welterweight division.

== Mixed martial arts career ==
=== Early career ===
Before joining the UFC, Rivas amassed a record of 5–0, with all but one of his wins coming by stoppages.

=== The Ultimate Fighter: Latin America ===
Rivas was a part of the 1st season of The Ultimate Fighter: Latin America. He was a part of team Latin America who were coached by Fabrício Werdum. He was eliminated in the quarter-finals by Gabriel Benítez by rear-naked choke.

=== Ultimate Fighting Championship ===
Rivas made his promotional debut against Rodolfo Rubio on November 8, 2014, at UFC Fight Night 56. He won the fight via unanimous decision.

Rivas was briefly linked to a bout with Makwan Amirkhani on June 20, 2015, at UFC Fight Night 69. However, shortly after the bout was announced, Rivas was pulled from the fight due to undisclosed reasons and replaced by Masio Fullen.

Rivas next faced Noad Lahat on February 6, 2016, at UFC Fight Night 82. He won the fight via knockout in the second round and earned a Performance of the Night bonus.

Rivas faced José Alberto Quiñónez on August 5, 2017, at UFC Fight Night 114. He lost the fight by unanimous decision.

Rivas faced Guido Cannetti on May 19, 2018, at UFC Fight Night 129. He lost the fight by unanimous decision.

On August 14, 2018, it was announced that Rivas was released from UFC.

In 2019, Rivas decided that he wouldn't continue his MMA career, as he would focus on a boxing career instead.

== Personal life ==
After the Noad Lahat fight in early 2016, Rivas was diagnosed with testicular cancer which was successfully treated.

== Championships and accomplishments ==
=== Mixed martial arts ===
- Ultimate Fighting Championship
  - Performance of the Night (One time) vs. Noad Lahat
  - UFC.com Awards
    - 2016: Half-Year Awards: Best Knockout of the 1HY & Ranked #3 Knockout of the Year vs. Noad Lahat
- Forbes
  - 2016 UFC Knockout of the Year vs. Noad Lahat at UFC Fight Night: Hendricks vs. Thompson

== Mixed martial arts record ==
Professional record breakdown
9 matches	7 wins	2 losses
By knockout	2	0
By submission	3	0
By decision	2	2

Res.	Record	Opponent	Method	Event	Date	Round	Time	Location	Notes
Loss	7–2	Guido Cannetti	Decision (unanimous)	UFC Fight Night: Maia vs. Usman	May 19, 2018	3	5:00	Santiago, Chile	
Loss	7–1	José Alberto Quiñónez	Decision (unanimous)	UFC Fight Night: Pettis vs. Moreno	August 5, 2017	3	5:00	Mexico City, Mexico	Bantamweight debut.
Win	7–0	Noad Lahat	KO (flying knee)	UFC Fight Night: Hendricks vs. Thompson	February 6, 2016	2	0:23	Las Vegas, Nevada, United States	Performance of the Night.
Win	6–0	Rodolfo Rubio	Decision (unanimous)	UFC Fight Night: Shogun vs. Saint Preux	November 8, 2014	3	5:00	Uberlândia, Brazil	
Win	5–0	Gaston Gomez Manzur	Decision (unanimous)	Masters Fighters Championship 10	February 16, 2014	3	5:00	Valparaíso, Chile	
Win	4–0	Patricio Lagos	TKO (doctor stoppage)	Masters Fighters Championship	December 10, 2011	2	5:00	Santiago, Chile	
Win	3–0	Rodolfo Guzman	Submission (rear-naked choke)	Masters Fighters Championship	December 10, 2011	1	2:52	Santiago, Chile	
Win	2–0	Pablo Reyes	Submission (punches)	Extreme Kumite Evolution 3	October 22, 2011	1	2:01	Temuco, Chile	
Win	1–0	Jaime Barriga	Submission (guillotine choke)	Extreme Kumite Evolution 2	June 4, 2011	1	1:35	Temuco, Chile	

== Professional boxing record ==
No.	Result	Record	Opponent	Type	Round, time	Date	Location	Notes
2	Win	2-0	(Argentina) Carlos Urrutia	UD	4	13 Dec 2019	Temuco, Chile	
1	Win	1-0	(Chile) Luis Villalobos	KO	1 (4)	5 Jul 2019	Santiago, Chile	

== See also ==
- List of male mixed martial artists
