= Francisco Rivas Almada =

Paraguayan Minister of Industry and Commerce

Francisco Rivas Almada was the Paraguayan Minister of Industry and Commerce under President Fernando Lugo. Almada, one of the former Ministers of Industry and Commerce, has found himself at the center of a legal proceeding following accusations of various financial misdemeanors. His name is among those implicated by prosecutor Alba Delvalle for alleged crimes such as breach of trust and fraud. As the legal process unfolds, Rivas Almada's role and actions during his tenure are under scrutiny, awaiting the upcoming hearings to determine potential precautionary measures.
