= UFC on ESPN: Barboza vs. Gaethje =

UFC mixed martial arts event in 2019

- The poster for UFC on ESPN: Barboza vs. Gaethje
- Promotion: Ultimate Fighting Championship
- Date: March 30, 2019
- Venue: Wells Fargo Center
- City: Philadelphia, Pennsylvania
- Attendance: 11,123
- Total gate: $1,102,542.16

Event chronology
UFC Fight Night: Thompson vs. Pettis	UFC on ESPN: Barboza vs. Gaethje	UFC 236: Holloway vs. Poirier 2

UFC on ESPN: Barboza vs. Gaethje (also known as UFC on ESPN 2) was a mixed martial arts event produced by the Ultimate Fighting Championship that was held on March 30, 2019 at the Wells Fargo Center in Philadelphia, Pennsylvania.

== Background ==
This was the third UFC event in Philadelphia and the first since UFC 133 in August 2011.

A lightweight bout between Edson Barboza and former WSOF Lightweight Champion Justin Gaethje served as the event headliner.

A strawweight bout between Alexa Grasso and Marina Rodriguez was scheduled at UFC Fight Night: Assunção vs. Moraes 2. However, it was reported on December 17, that Rodriguez pulled out of the event due to a hand injury. The pairing was left intact and rescheduled for this event. In turn, it was reported that Grasso was pulled from the bout due to injury and replaced by former WSOF Women's Strawweight Champion Jessica Aguilar.

A bantamweight bout between former UFC Flyweight Championship challenger Ray Borg and Liu Pingyuan was scheduled to take place at the event. However, it was reported on March 13, that Liu was replaced by newcomer Kyler Phillips for an undisclosed reason. In turn, Phillips was removed from the card on March 25 for undisclosed reasons and replaced by Casey Kenney.

At the weigh-ins, Borg weighed in at 137.75 lb, 1.75 lb over the bantamweight non-title fight limit of 136 lb. He was fined 20% of his fight purse and his bout against Kenney proceeded at catchweight.

== Results ==
Main Card (ESPN)
Weight class				Method	Round	Time	Notes
Lightweight	Justin Gaethje	def.	Edson Barboza	KO (punch)	1	2:30
Middleweight	Jack Hermansson	def.	David Branch	Submission (guillotine choke)	1	0:49
Featherweight	Josh Emmett	def.	Michael Johnson	KO (punch)	3	4:14
Women's Strawweight	Michelle Waterson	def.	Karolina Kowalkiewicz	Decision (unanimous) (30–27, 30–27, 30–27)	3	5:00
Light Heavyweight	Paul Craig	def.	Kennedy Nzechukwu	Submission (triangle choke)	3	4:20	(Note: Nzechukwu was deducted one point in round 3 due to repeated eye pokes.)
Featherweight	Sodiq Yusuff	def.	Sheymon Moraes	Decision (unanimous) (29–27, 29–28, 29–28)	3	5:00
Preliminary Card (ESPN)
Women's Strawweight	Marina Rodriguez	def.	Jessica Aguilar	Decision (unanimous) (29–26, 29–27, 29–27)	3	5:00	(Note: Rodriguez was deducted one point in round 1 due to repeated eye pokes.)
Lightweight	Desmond Green	def.	Ross Pearson	TKO (punches)	1	2:52
Featherweight	Kevin Aguilar	def.	Enrique Barzola	Decision (unanimous) (29–28, 29–28, 29–28)	3	5:00
Middleweight	Kevin Holland	def.	Gerald Meerschaert	Decision (split) (29–28, 28–29, 30–27)	3	5:00
Early Preliminary Card (ESPN+)
Catchweight (137.75 lb)	Casey Kenney	def.	Ray Borg	Decision (unanimous) (29–28, 29–28, 30–27)	3	5:00
Women's Flyweight	Maryna Moroz	def.	Sabina Mazo	Decision (unanimous) (30–27, 29–28, 29–28)	3	5:00
Bantamweight	Alex Perez	def.	Mark De La Rosa	Decision (unanimous) (30–27, 30–27, 30–27)	3	5:00

== Bonus awards ==
The following fighters were awarded $50,000 bonuses:

- Fight of the Night: Justin Gaethje vs. Edson Barboza
- Performance of the Night: Jack Hermansson and Paul Craig

== See also ==
- List of UFC events
- 2019 in UFC
- List of current UFC fighters
