= Eric Shelton (fighter) =

American MMA fighter

- Born: Eric Maurice Shelton; February 2, 1991 (age 35); Lawton, Oklahoma, United States
- Other names: Showtime
- Height: 5 ft 6 in (1.68 m)
- Weight: 125 lb (57 kg; 8.9 st)
- Division: Bantamweight; Flyweight
- Reach: 68 in (173 cm)
- Fighting out of: East Moline, Illinois, United States
- Team: Team Spratt (2015–2018); American Top Team (2018–present); RPBJJ
- Years active: 2013–present

Professional boxing record
- Total: 1
- Wins: 1
- Losses: 0

Mixed martial arts record
- Total: 30
- Wins: 21
- By knockout: 5
- By submission: 6
- By decision: 10
- Losses: 9
- By submission: 1
- By decision: 8

Other information
- Boxing record from BoxRec
- Mixed martial arts record from Sherdog

Eric Maurice Shelton (born February 2, 1991) is an American mixed martial arts fighter competed in the Flyweight division of the Ultimate Fighting Championship. A professional competitor since 2013, he has also competed for the RFA and was a contestant on The Ultimate Fighter: Tournament of Champions.

== Mixed martial arts career ==
=== Early career ===
Shelton began his professional MMA career in July 2013, upon compiling an impressive 11–2 record during his amateur career. Over the next three-and-a-half years he fought mainly in the mid-west, amassing a record of 10–2.

=== The Ultimate Fighter ===
In July 2016, it was announced that Shelton would be a cast member of The Ultimate Fighter: Tournament of Champions. He was ranked #15 and selected by Team Benavidez.

In the first round, Shelton defeated Yoni Sherbatov via technical submission (rear-naked choke) in the second round. In the quarterfinals, he defeated Ronaldo Candido by unanimous decision. In the semifinals, Shelton lost to eventual winner Tim Elliott via unanimous decision after two rounds.

=== Ultimate Fighting Championship ===
After The Ultimate Fighter, Shelton was signed to a UFC contract. He faced Alexandre Pantoja in his debut on January 28, 2017, at UFC on Fox: Shevchenko vs. Peña. He lost the fight via split decision.

In his second fight for the promotion, Shelton faced Jarred Brooks on July 29, 2017, at UFC 214. He again lost the fight via split decision.

In his third fight for the promotion, Shelton faced Jenel Lausa on November 19, 2017, at UFC Fight Night: Werdum vs. Tybura. He won the fight via unanimous decision to earn his first UFC victory.

Shelton faced Alex Perez on February 24, 2018, at UFC on Fox: Emmett vs. Stephens. At the weigh-ins, Perez weighed in at 126.5 pounds, half a pound over the lightweight non title fight upper limit of 126 pounds. As a result, the bout proceeded at catchweight and Perez was fined 20% of his purse, which went to Shelton. Shelton lost the fight via unanimous decision.

Shelton faced Joseph Morales on November 10, 2018, at UFC Fight Night: Korean Zombie vs. Rodríguez. He won the fight via split decision.

Shelton faced Jordan Espinosa on March 23, 2019, at UFC Fight Night: Thompson vs. Pettis. He lost the fight via unanimous decision.

On May 26, 2019, it was reported that Shelton was released by the UFC.

=== Post-UFC career ===
After being released from the UFC, Shelton signed with the WXC. He made his promotional debut against Jesse Bazzi at WXC 83 on October 30, 2019. He won the fight via unanimous decision.

With the win, Shelton earned a title shot against Juancamilo Ronderos at WXC 85 on December 18, 2019. He lost the fight via split decision.

On June 6, 2020, news surfaced that Shelton had signed with ARES FC.

Shelton faced Rilley Dutro for the vacant Caged Aggression Flyweight Championship on May 8, 2021. He claimed the championship after Dutro suffered an elbow injury in the fourth round.

Shelton faced Jacob Silva on December 19, 2021, at Fury FC 55. He won the bout via unanimous decision.

Shelton faced Peter Caballero at Fury FC 67 on August 14, 2022. He would lose the fight via unanimous decision marking his second loss since leaving the UFC.

Shelton next faced Dwight Joseph in the main event of Caged Aggression 35 for the vacant Caged Aggression Bantamweight championship on 25 March 2023. He would win fight via unanimous decision.

Shelton would then main event Unified MMA 51 against Teshay Gouthro for the Unified MMA Interim Bantamweight championship on 23 June 2023. He would win the fight via split decision.

Shelton faced highly touted MMA Lab prospect Abdul Kamara at Fury FC 92 on June 16, 2024. He would win the fight via second round knockout.

Shelton would next face off against Bellator veteran Jerrell Hodge in the main event of Caged Aggression 38: Retaliation on October 12, 2024 in a defence of his Caged Aggression Bantamweight championship. He would win the fight via first round knockout.

== Championships and accomplishments ==
- Caged Aggression
  - Flyweight Champion (Two times; current)
  - Bantamweight Champion
- Unified MMA
  - Interim Bantamweight Champion

== Mixed martial arts record ==
Professional record breakdown
30 matches	21 wins	9 losses
By knockout	5	0
By submission	6	1
By decision	10	8

Res.	Record	Opponent	Method	Event	Date	Round	Time	Location	Notes
Win	21–9	Eduardo Penha	Decision (unanimous)	Fury FC 116	February 20, 2026	3	5:00	Houston, Texas, United States	
Loss	20–9	Shuya Kamikubo	Submission (rear-naked choke)	LFA 215	August 22, 2025	2	1:46	Ventura, California, United States	Catchweight (136.4 lb) bout; Shelton missed weight.
Win	20–8	Alan Olivas	Submission (rear-naked choke)	Synergy FC 17	January 4, 2025	1	4:11	Springfield, Missouri, United States	Won the inaugural Synergy FC Bantamweight Championship.
Win	19–8	Jerrell Hodge	KO (punch)	Caged Aggression 38	October 12, 2024	1	4:21	Davenport, Iowa, United States	Defended the CAMMA Bantamweight Championship.
Win	18–8	Abdul Kamara	KO (punches)	Fury FC 92	June 16, 2024	2	2:51	Houston, Texas, United States	
Win	17–8	Teshay Gouthro	Decision (split)	Unified MMA 51	June 23, 2023	5	5:00	Niagara Falls, Ontario, Canada	Won the interim Unified MMA Bantamweight Championship.
Win	16–8	Dwight Joseph	Decision (unanimous)	Caged Aggression 35	March 25, 2023	5	5:00	Davenport, Iowa, United States	Won the vacant CAMMA Bantamweight Championship.
Loss	15–8	Peter Caballero	Decision (unanimous)	Fury FC 67	August 14, 2022	3	5:00	Houston, Texas, United States	Return to Bantamweight.
Win	15–7	Jacob Silva	Decision (unanimous)	Fury FC 55	December 19, 2021	3	5:00	Houston, Texas, United States	
Win	14–7	Rilley Dutro	TKO (corner stoppage)	Caged Aggression 31	May 7, 2021	4	4:10	Davenport, Iowa, United States	Won the CAMMA Flyweight Championship.
Loss	13–7	Juancamilo Ronderos	Decision (split)	WXC 85	December 18, 2019	5	5:00	Southgate, Michigan, United States	For the WXC Flyweight Championship.
Win	13–6	Jesse Bazzi	Decision (unanimous)	WXC 83	October 30, 2019	3	5:00	Southgate, Michigan, United States	
Loss	12–6	Jordan Espinosa	Decision (unanimous)	UFC Fight Night: Thompson vs. Pettis	March 23, 2019	3	5:00	Nashville, Tennessee, United States	
Win	12–5	Joseph Morales	Decision (split)	UFC Fight Night: The Korean Zombie vs. Rodríguez	November 10, 2018	3	5:00	Denver, Colorado, United States	
Loss	11–5	Alex Perez	Decision (unanimous)	UFC on Fox: Emmett vs. Stephens	February 24, 2018	3	5:00	Orlando, Florida, United States	Catchweight (126.5 lb) bout; Perez missed weight.
Win	11–4	Jenel Lausa	Decision (unanimous)	UFC Fight Night: Werdum vs. Tybura	November 19, 2017	3	5:00	Sydney, Australia	
Loss	10–4	Jarred Brooks	Decision (split)	UFC 214	July 29, 2017	3	5:00	Anaheim, California, United States	
Loss	10–3	Alexandre Pantoja	Decision (split)	UFC on Fox: Shevchenko vs. Peña	January 28, 2017	3	5:00	Denver, Colorado, United States	
Win	10–2	Mark Sainci	Submission (triangle choke)	Caged Aggression 17	April 2, 2016	1	1:08	Davenport, Iowa, United States	Won the vacant CAMMA Flyweight Championship.
Win	9–2	Ryan Hollis	Decision (unanimous)	Cowboys Extreme Cagefighting 24	January 30, 2016	3	5:00	San Antonio, Texas, United States	Catchweight (127 lb) bout; Hollis missed weight.
Win	8–2	Gino Escamilla	Decision (unanimous)	Rocks Xtreme MMA 19	October 23, 2015	3	5:00	San Antonio, Texas, United States	
Win	7–2	Brian Hall	TKO (punches)	V3 Fights: Hall vs. Shelton	September 26, 2015	2	3:38	Memphis, Tennessee, United States	
Loss	6–2	Kevin Gray	Decision (split)	Caged Aggression 15: Day 2	March 28, 2015	5	5:00	Davenport, Iowa, United States	Lost the CAMMA Flyweight Championship.
Win	6–1	Erik Vo	Submission (rear-naked choke)	Pinnacle Combat 18	January 24, 2015	2	1:09	Dubuque, Iowa, United States	Bantamweight bout.
Win	5–1	Jose Vega	Technical Submission (guillotine choke)	Caged Aggression 14	October 10, 2014	1	0:00	Davenport, Iowa, United States	Defended the CAMMA Flyweight Championship.
Loss	4–1	Sid Bice	Decision (unanimous)	RFA 16	July 25, 2014	3	5:00	Broomfield, Colorado, United States	
Win	4–0	Chris Haney	Submission (rear-naked choke)	Xplode Fight Series: Anger	May 2, 2014	1	4:34	Davenport, Iowa, United States	Won the vacant XFS Flyweight Championship.
Win	3–0	Zachary Harvey	TKO (punches)	Caged Aggression 12	March 15, 2014	1	2:50	Davenport, Iowa, United States	Won the CAMMA Flyweight Championship.
Win	2–0	Marcel Tong Van	Submission (armbar)	Caged Aggression 11	October 12, 2013	1	1:18	Davenport, Iowa, United States	Flyweight debut.
Win	1–0	Stephen Gladhill	Decision (unanimous)	Caged Aggression 10	July 20, 2013	5	5:00	Davenport, Iowa, United States	Bantamweight debut. Won the inaugural CAMMA Bantamweight Championship.

=== Mixed martial arts exhibition record ===
Exhibition record breakdown		
3 matches	2 wins	1 loss
By submission	1	0
By decision	1	1

Res.	Record	Opponent	Method	Event	Date	Round	Time	Location	Notes
Loss	2–1	Tim Elliott	Decision (majority)	The Ultimate Fighter: Tournament of Champions	November 23, 2016	2	5:00	Las Vegas, Nevada, United States	TUF 24 Semi-final round
Win	2–0	Ronaldo Candido	Decision (unanimous)	The Ultimate Fighter: Tournament of Champions	November 16, 2016	2	5:00	Las Vegas, Nevada, United States	TUF 24 Quarter-final round
Win	1–0	Yoni Sherbatov	Submission (rear-naked choke)	The Ultimate Fighter: Tournament of Champions	September 21, 2016	2	3:40	Las Vegas, Nevada, United States	TUF 24 Round of 16

*Date given is the air date of the episode. The actual dates of the fight are not released by the UFC.

== Professional boxing record ==
1 fight	1 win	0 losses
By knockout	1	0

No.	Result	Record	Opponent	Type	Round, time	Date	Location	Notes
1	Win	1–0	(United States) Anthony Crowder	TKO	2 (4)	28 November 2020	(United States) Mississippi Valley Fairgrounds, Davenport, Iowa, US	
