= Tim Elliott =

American mixed martial artist (born 1986)

- Born: Timothy Samuel Elliott; December 24, 1986 (age 39); Arkansas City, Kansas, U.S.
- Height: 5 ft 7 in (1.70 m)
- Weight: 125 lb (57 kg; 8.9 st)
- Division: Flyweight (2009–present)
- Reach: 66 in (168 cm)
- Fighting out of: Lee's Summit, Missouri, U.S.
- Team: Grindhouse / Glory MMA and Fitness (2011–2017, 2020–2022); Xtreme Couture (2017–2020); Next Generation MMA (2022–present)
- Rank: Purple belt in Brazilian Jiu-Jitsu
- Wrestling: NCAA Division II Wrestling
- Years active: 2009–present

Mixed martial arts record
- Total: 37
- Wins: 22
- By knockout: 3
- By submission: 8
- By decision: 11
- Losses: 14
- By knockout: 1
- By submission: 6
- By decision: 7
- Draws: 1

Other information
- Spouse: Gina Mazany (div. 2023)
- Mixed martial arts record from Sherdog

Timothy Samuel Elliott (born December 24, 1986) is an American mixed martial artist who competes in the Flyweight division of the Ultimate Fighting Championship (UFC). Competing professionally since 2009, Elliott is the former Titan FC Flyweight Champion and the winner of The Ultimate Fighter: Tournament of Champions.

== Background ==
Elliott was born on December 24, 1986, in Arkansas City, Kansas. When he was in fourth grade, Elliott moved with his father to Haysville, Kansas, where he started wrestling. Elliott originally attended Campus High School where he was a state wrestling runner-up, but transferred to Wichita South High School during his junior year. Elliott then became a state champion at Wichita South his senior year in 2005.

He was on the wrestling team at Labette Community College, before transferring to the University of Central Oklahoma, earning All-American honors, placing every year during his collegiate wrestling career and becoming the NJCAA wrestling national champion in 2007. He earned a bachelor's degree in Science and General Studies.

== Mixed martial arts career ==
=== Early career ===
Elliott compiled a record of 8–2–1 in his first 11 fights before signing with the UFC, including a notable KO victory over former UFC Lightweight Champion Jens Pulver. According to Elliott, he caught the former champion with a "lucky knee," and that he owes his career to his win over Pulver. Pulver was Elliott's favorite fighter at the time, and Elliott recalls being nervous beforehand and describes knocking him out as "bittersweet."

=== Ultimate Fighting Championship ===
Elliott signed with UFC on April 17, 2012 after putting together an eight-fight win streak.

In his UFC debut, Elliott faced The Ultimate Fighter 14 winner John Dodson on May 5, 2012, at UFC on Fox 3, replacing an injured Darren Uyenoyama on six day's notice. Elliott lost the fight via unanimous decision. Elliot has since described his fight against Dodson as life-changing.

In his second fight, Elliott faced Jared Papazian on December 15, 2012, at The Ultimate Fighter: Team Carwin vs. Team Nelson Finale. He won the fight via unanimous decision (30–25, 30–25, 30–26). The fight also earned him the Fight of the Night bonus. Elliott has stated that Papazian was effectively able to get into his head before the fight to the point that Elliott didn't want to fight him, and as such he felt "robbed" of his ability to perform to the best of his ability.

For his third fight, Elliott faced Louis Gaudinot on August 31, 2013, at UFC 164. He won the fight via unanimous decision.

Elliott fought Ali Bagautinov at UFC 167 on November 16, 2013. The bout marked his first appearance on the main card of a pay-per-view event in the fight. He lost the fight via unanimous decision.

Elliott faced Joseph Benavidez on April 26, 2014, at UFC 172. He lost the fight via submission in the first round.

Elliott was expected to face Wilson Reis on August 23, 2014, at UFC Fight Night 49. However, Elliott pulled out of the bout in the days leading up to the event.

Elliott faced Zach Makovsky on February 15, 2015, at UFC Fight Night 60. He lost the fight by unanimous decision. Following the fight, he was released from the organization.

=== Titan FC ===
Elliott made his debut and faced former UFC Flyweight Iliarde Santos at Titan FC 34 for the inaugural Titan FC Flyweight Championship. He won the fight by a dominant unanimous decision and picked up the Titan FC Flyweight Championship.

For his first title defense, Elliott faced undefeated prospect and promotional newcomer Felipe Efrain at Titan FC 35 on September 19, 2015. He won the fight by submission in the second round.

Elliott next faced former UFC Bantamweight Pedro Nobre at Titan FC 37 on March 5, 2016. He won the fight by unanimous decision for his second successful title defense.

=== The Ultimate Fighter ===
On July 21, 2016, Elliott was announced as a cast member on the 24th season of The Ultimate Fighter. The winner of the show, won a chance to fight Demetrious Johnson for the UFC Flyweight Championship. Despite being ranked as the number 3 seed, Elliott was selected as the first overall pick by former opponent Joseph Benavidez.

In his first fight, Elliott faced 14th ranked 'Team Cejudo' fighter Charlie Alaniz. He submitted Aniz in the first round by bulldog choke. In the quarterfinals, Elliott faced 6th ranked 'Team Cejudo' fighter and former Caged contestant Matt Schnell. Despite being struck with a devastating groin kick in the opening moments of the bout, he was able to recover and submit Schnell in the first round by front choke. In the semifinals, Elliott faced 15th ranked 'Team Benavidez' teammate Eric Shelton. After two competitive rounds, Elliott was declared the winner by majority decision. Elliott fought 5th ranked 'Team Benavidez' teammate Hiromasa Ougikubo in the final round. Elliott won the fight by unanimous decision 30–27 to win the tournament.

=== Return to the UFC ===
As a result of winning The Ultimate Fighter 24, Elliott won the opportunity to fight flyweight champion Demetrious Johnson. He fought Johnson on December 3, 2016, at The Ultimate Fighter 24 Finale for the flyweight championship. Elliott lost the fight by unanimous decision.

Elliott faced Louis Smolka on April 15, 2017, at UFC on Fox 24. He won the fight by unanimous decision. The win earned Elliott his second Fight of the Night bonus award, and his first since returning the organization.

Elliott faced Ben Nguyen on June 10, 2017, at UFC Fight Night 110. He was submitted with a rear-naked choke in the opening minute of the first round.

Elliott was expected to face Justin Scoggins on December 16, 2017, at UFC on Fox 26. However, Scoggins pulled out of the bout in early December citing a back injury and was replaced by Pietro Menga. The bout was cancelled as Menga failed to show to the weigh in because he did not make weight. Elliott was offered the fight at catchweight at 131 pounds, which would have given him 10% of Menga's fight purse, but he declined.

After the fight against Menga was cancelled, the UFC offered Elliott a fight at UFC 219, which Elliott only accepted under the condition he fights somebody who has never missed weight and has never backed out of a fight at the last minute. Elliott fought promotional newcomer Mark De La Rosa at bantamweight. He won in the second round by submission via an anaconda choke. After the fight, he dedicated the win to his coach, Robert Follis, who died earlier in the month. For the fight, Elliott won a $50,000 Performance of the Night bonus, his first performance of the night bonus and third fight bonus in the UFC overall.

Elliott tore his ACL in June 2018. He underwent successful surgery on it on June 14. He stated at the time that he expected miss at least a year before he could fight again.

Elliott faced Deiveson Figueiredo on October 12, 2019, at UFC on ESPN+ 19. He lost the fight via submission in the first round.

Elliott faced Askar Askarov January 18, 2020 at UFC 246. He lost the fight via unanimous decision.

Elliot faced promotional newcomer Brandon Royval on May 30, 2020, at UFC on ESPN 9. He lost the fight via submission in the second round. This fight earned Elliott his third Fight of the Night award. Elliott accepted a fight against Tyson Nam at UFC on ESPN 10, but the NSAC refused to allow him to fight since they placed him on a medical suspension after his previous fight.

Elliott fought Ryan Benoit on July 16, 2020, at UFC on ESPN 13. He won the fight by unanimous decision, securing his first win since 2017. Prior to the fight, he had signed a new four-fight contract with the promotion. On August 3, 2020, it was reported that Elliott had tested positive for marijuana after the fight and is facing a suspension. Later that day, he posted to his Twitter blaming the positive test on taking the fight on short notice. Elliott was suspended four and a half months and fined 15% if his purse by the Nevada State Athletic Commission on September 3, 2020, after positive for marijuana. The suspension is retroactive to June 17, 2020, and he will be eligible to compete again on November 2, 2020.

Elliott was expected to face Jordan Espinosa on January 16, 2021, at UFC on ABC 1. However, Espinosa tested positive for COVID-19 in late December and the pairing was moved to UFC 259. Elliott won the fight via unanimous decision. During the fight, Elliott accused Espinoza of being a "woman beater" after someone sent Elliott screenshot of messages between Espinoza and an unnamed girl along with images of choke marks on a person's neck. Espinoza responded by saying, "you don't know the whole story". Police stated that Espinoza had never been convicted of domestic abuse.

Elliott was scheduled to face Su Mudaerji on June 26, 2021, at UFC Fight Night 190 However, Mudaerji had to pull out off the bout due to a knee injury that required surgery.

Elliott faced Matheus Nicolau on October 9, 2021, at UFC Fight Night 194. He lost the fight via unanimous decision.

Elliott faced Tagir Ulanbekov on March 5, 2022, at UFC 272. He won the fight via unanimous decision. 12 out of 17 media scores gave it to Ulanbekov.

Elliot was scheduled to face Amir Albazi on June 25, 2022 at UFC on ESPN 38 but pulled out due to undisclosed reasons.

Elliot was scheduled to face Allan Nascimento on June 3, 2023, at UFC on ESPN 46. However on April 28, Nascimento pulled out due to undisclosed reasons and was replaced by Victor Altamirano. He won the fight via unanimous decision.

Elliott faced Muhammad Mokaev at UFC 294 on October 21, 2023. He lost the fight via arm-triangle choke submission in the third round.

Elliott faced Su Mudaerji, replacing injured Allan Nascimento, on December 9, 2023, at UFC Fight Night 233. He won the fight via arm-triangle choke in round one. This fight earned him the Performance of the Night award.

Elliott was scheduled to face Tatsuro Taira on May 18, 2024 at UFC Fight Night 241. However, due to Elliott's undisclosed injury, the bout was scrapped.

Elliott faced former UFC Flyweight Championship challenger Kai Asakura on August 16, 2025 at UFC 319. He won the fight via a guillotine choke in round two. This win earned Elliott his third Performance of the Night award.

Elliott faced former UFC Flyweight Championship challenger Steve Erceg on May 2, 2026 at UFC Fight Night 275. He lost the fight via unanimous decision.

Elliott faced Édgar Cháirez in a 130 pound catchweight bout on September 12, 2026 at UFC Fight Night 288. He won the fight by unanimous decision.

== Fighting style ==
Elliott is regarded as an erratic and unorthodox fighter, using unconventional striking, level changes, and acrobatics to disrupt his opponent's rhythm. During his tenure on The Ultimate Fighter, coach Joseph Benavidez praised Elliott's style as awkward, unpredictable, hard to read, and "controlled chaos." As a national wrestling champion and BJJ purple belt, he is a skilled and dangerous grappler with eight submission wins. He aggressively hunts for submissions, even during scrambles and from disadvantageous positions. Elliott has stated that he used to be a more conventional ground-and-pound fighter, but that he deliberately adopted his unique style before his fight with John Dodson after being encouraged by Dana White to be exciting immediately before the fight.

== Personal life ==
He was in a relationship with fellow UFC fighter Gina Mazany. On July 28, 2020, Elliott announced on his Instagram that he and Mazany were engaged. Elliott and Mazany have since divorced. He has one daughter from a previous relationship.

== Championships and accomplishments ==
=== Mixed martial arts ===
- Ultimate Fighting Championship
  - The Ultimate Fighter: Tournament of Champions Winner
  - Fight of the Night (Three times) vs. Jared Papazian, Louis Smolka and Brandon Royval
  - Performance of the Night (Three times) vs. Mark De La Rosa, Su Mudaerji and Kai Asakura
  - Most takedowns landed in UFC Flyweight division history (63)
  - Most total strikes landed in UFC Flyweight division history (1921)
  - Second most bouts in UFC Flyweight division history (20) (behind Brandon Moreno)
  - Tied (Joseph Benavidez, Joshua Van & Kyoji Horiguchi) for most decision wins in UFC Flyweight division history (7)
  - Most decision bouts in UFC Flyweight division history (14)
  - Most unanimous decision wins in UFC Flyweight division history (7)
  - Third most total fight time in UFC Flyweight division history (4:19:05)
  - Second most control time in UFC Flyweight division history (1:13:07) (behind Demetrious Johnson)
  - Second most top position time in UFC Flyweight division history (1:03:39) (behind Demetrious Johnson)
  - Fifth most significant strikes in UFC Flyweight division history (926)
  - Third most submission attempts in UFC Flyweight division history (16)
  - UFC.com Awards
    - 2017: Ranked #6 Fight of the Year vs. Louis Smolka
- Titan FC
  - Titan FC Flyweight Championship (One time; first, former)
    - Two successful title defenses
- Combat Press
  - 2016 Comeback Fighter of the Year

== Mixed martial arts record ==
Professional record breakdown
37 matches	22 wins	14 losses
By knockout	3	1
By submission	8	6
By decision	11	7
Draws	1	

Res.	Record	Opponent	Method	Event	Date	Round	Time	Location	Notes
Win	22–14–1	Édgar Cháirez	Decision (unanimous)	UFC Fight Night: Silva vs. Delgado	September 12, 2026	3	5:00	Glendale, Arizona, United States	Catchweight (130 lb) bout.
Loss	21–14–1	Steve Erceg	Decision (unanimous)	UFC Fight Night: Della Maddalena vs. Prates	May 2, 2026	3	5:00	Perth, Australia	
Win	21–13–1	Kai Asakura	Submission (guillotine choke)	UFC 319	August 16, 2025	2	4:39	Chicago, Illinois, United States	Performance of the Night.
Win	20–13–1	Su Mudaerji	Technical Submission (arm-triangle choke)	UFC Fight Night: Song vs. Gutiérrez	December 9, 2023	1	4:02	Las Vegas, Nevada, United States	Bantamweight bout. Performance of the Night.
Loss	19–13–1	Muhammad Mokaev	Submission (arm-triangle choke)	UFC 294	October 21, 2023	3	3:03	Abu Dhabi, United Arab Emirates	
Win	19–12–1	Victor Altamirano	Decision (unanimous)	UFC on ESPN: Kara-France vs. Albazi	June 3, 2023	3	5:00	Las Vegas, Nevada, United States	
Win	18–12–1	Tagir Ulanbekov	Decision (unanimous)	UFC 272	March 5, 2022	3	5:00	Las Vegas, Nevada, United States	
Loss	17–12–1	Matheus Nicolau	Decision (unanimous)	UFC Fight Night: Dern vs. Rodriguez	October 8, 2021	3	5:00	Las Vegas, Nevada, United States	
Win	17–11–1	Jordan Espinosa	Decision (unanimous)	UFC 259	March 6, 2021	3	5:00	Las Vegas, Nevada, United States	
Win	16–11–1	Ryan Benoit	Decision (unanimous)	UFC on ESPN: Kattar vs. Ige	July 16, 2020	3	5:00	Abu Dhabi, United Arab Emirates	
Loss	15–11–1	Brandon Royval	Submission (arm-triangle choke)	UFC on ESPN: Woodley vs. Burns	May 30, 2020	2	3:18	Las Vegas, Nevada, United States	Fight of the Night.
Loss	15–10–1	Askar Askarov	Decision (unanimous)	UFC 246	January 18, 2020	3	5:00	Las Vegas, Nevada, United States	
Loss	15–9–1	Deiveson Figueiredo	Submission (guillotine choke)	UFC Fight Night: Joanna vs. Waterson	October 12, 2019	1	3:08	Tampa, Florida, United States	
Win	15–8–1	Mark De La Rosa	Submission (anaconda choke)	UFC 219	December 30, 2017	2	1:41	Las Vegas, Nevada, United States	Bantamweight bout. Performance of the Night.
Loss	14–8–1	Ben Nguyen	Submission (rear-naked choke)	UFC Fight Night: Lewis vs. Hunt	June 11, 2017	1	0:49	Auckland, New Zealand	
Win	14–7–1	Louis Smolka	Decision (unanimous)	UFC on Fox: Johnson vs. Reis	April 15, 2017	3	5:00	Kansas City, Missouri, United States	Fight of the Night.
Loss	13–7–1	Demetrious Johnson	Decision (unanimous)	The Ultimate Fighter: Tournament of Champions Finale	December 3, 2016	5	5:00	Las Vegas, Nevada, United States	For the UFC Flyweight Championship.
Win	13–6–1	Pedro Nobre	Decision (unanimous)	Titan FC 37	March 5, 2016	5	5:00	Ridgefield, Washington, United States	Defended the Titan FC Flyweight Championship.
Win	12–6–1	Felipe Efrain	Submission (guillotine choke)	Titan FC 35	September 19, 2015	2	2:30	Ridgefield, Washington, United States	Defended the Titan FC Flyweight Championship.
Win	11–6–1	Iliarde Santos	Decision (unanimous)	Titan FC 34	July 18, 2015	5	5:00	Kansas City, Missouri, United States	Won the inaugural Titan FC Flyweight Championship.
Loss	10–6–1	Zach Makovsky	Decision (unanimous)	UFC Fight Night: Henderson vs. Thatch	February 14, 2015	3	5:00	Broomfield, Colorado, United States	
Loss	10–5–1	Joseph Benavidez	Submission (guillotine choke)	UFC 172	April 26, 2014	1	4:08	Baltimore, Maryland, United States	
Loss	10–4–1	Ali Bagautinov	Decision (unanimous)	UFC 167	November 16, 2013	3	5:00	Las Vegas, Nevada, United States	
Win	10–3–1	Louis Gaudinot	Decision (unanimous)	UFC 164	August 31, 2013	3	5:00	Milwaukee, Wisconsin, United States	
Win	9–3–1	Jared Papazian	Decision (unanimous)	The Ultimate Fighter: Team Carwin vs. Team Nelson Finale	December 15, 2012	3	5:00	Las Vegas, Nevada, United States	Papazian was deducted one point in round 1 due to an illegal knee. Fight of the Night.
Loss	8–3–1	John Dodson	Decision (unanimous)	UFC on Fox: Diaz vs. Miller	May 5, 2012	3	5:00	East Rutherford, New Jersey, United States	
Win	8–2–1	Josh Rave	Technical Submission (brabo choke)	RFA 2	March 30, 2012	1	0:28	Kearney, Nebraska, United States	Flyweight debut.
Win	7–2–1	Jens Pulver	KO (knee)	RFA 1	December 16, 2011	2	2:12	Kearney, Nebraska, United States	Bantamweight bout.
Win	6–2–1	Kashif Solarin	Submission (guillotine choke)	Cowboy MMA: Caged Cowboys	May 21, 2011	1	0:57	Ponca City, Oklahoma, United States	
Win	5–2–1	John McDowell	TKO (punches)	Art of War Cage Fights 1	February 26, 2011	1	2:56	Ponca City, Oklahoma, United States	
Win	4–2–1	Victor Dominguez	Decision (unanimous)	C3 Fights 26	October 22, 2010	3	5:00	Newkirk, Oklahoma, United States	
Win	3–2–1	Cody Fuller	Submission (triangle choke)	Oklahoma FC: Bricktown Brawl 5	June 25, 2010	3	2:34	Oklahoma City, Oklahoma, United States	
Win	2–2–1	Michael Casteel	Submission (rear-naked choke)	Oklahoma FC: Bricktown Brawl 4	April 2, 2010	1	2:01	Oklahoma City, Oklahoma, United States	
Win	1–2–1	Victor Veloquio	KO (punches)	Oklahoma FC: Bricktown Brawl 3	December 11, 2009	1	0:33	Oklahoma City, Oklahoma, United States	
Loss	0–2–1	Jacky Bryant	TKO (punches)	Oklahoma FC: Bricktown Brawl 2	August 28, 2009	1	0:52	Oklahoma City, Oklahoma, United States	
Loss	0–1–1	Shane Howell	Submission (triangle choke)	Harrah Fight Night 1	June 27, 2009	3	2:25	Harrah, Oklahoma, United States	
Draw	0–0–1	Jerod Spoon	Draw (unanimous)	Oklahoma FC: Bricktown Brawl 1	May 8, 2009	3	5:00	Oklahoma City, Oklahoma, United States	

=== Mixed martial arts exhibition record ===
Exhibition record breakdown		
4 matches	4 wins	0 losses
By submission	2	0
By decision	2	0

Res.	Record	Opponent	Method	Event	Date	Round	Time	Location	Notes
Win	4–0	Hiromasa Ougikubo	Decision (unanimous)	The Ultimate Fighter: Tournament of Champions	November 30, 2016	3	5:00	Las Vegas, Nevada, United States	TUF 24 Final round
Win	3–0	Eric Shelton	Decision (majority)	The Ultimate Fighter: Tournament of Champions	November 23, 2016	2	5:00	Las Vegas, Nevada, United States	TUF 24 Semi-final round
Win	2–0	Matt Schnell	Submission (front choke)	The Ultimate Fighter: Tournament of Champions	November 16, 2016	1	3:24	Las Vegas, Nevada, United States	TUF 24 Quarter-final round
Win	1–0	Charlie Alaniz	Submission (bulldog choke)	The Ultimate Fighter: Tournament of Champions	October 12, 2016	1	1:51	Las Vegas, Nevada, United States	TUF 24 Round of 16

*Date given is the air date of the episode. The actual dates of the fight are not released by the UFC

== See also ==
- List of male mixed martial artists
