= UFC Fight Night: The Korean Zombie vs. Rodríguez =

UFC mixed martial arts event in 2018

- The poster for UFC Fight Night: The Korean Zombie vs. Rodríguez
- Promotion: Ultimate Fighting Championship
- Date: November 10, 2018
- Venue: Pepsi Center
- City: Denver, Colorado
- Attendance: 11,426
- Total gate: $946,706

Event chronology
| UFC 230: Cormier vs. Lewis | UFC Fight Night: The Korean Zombie vs. Rodríguez | UFC Fight Night: Magny vs. Ponzinibbio |

UFC Fight Night: The Korean Zombie vs. Rodríguez (also known as UFC Fight Night 139) was a mixed martial arts event produced by the Ultimate Fighting Championship that was held on November 10, 2018, at Pepsi Center in Denver, Colorado, United States.

== Background ==
The UFC celebrated its 25th anniversary at this event, given its first event took place on November 12, 1993, in Denver at the now-demolished McNichols Sports Arena. UFC officials went to a throwback theme for the event, using the original UFC logo, and non-Fox related television graphics were based on the original pay-per-view broadcast.

A featherweight bout between former UFC Lightweight Champion Frankie Edgar and former UFC Featherweight Championship challenger Chan Sung Jung was expected to serve as the event headliner. However, on October 26, it was reported that Edgar pulled out due to injury and was replaced by The Ultimate Fighter: Latin America featherweight winner Yair Rodríguez.

Ricardo Ramos was expected to face Ricky Simón at the event. However, on October 15, it was reported that Ramos pulled out due to a hand injury, and in turn, Simon was removed from the card as well.

A lightweight bout between Beneil Dariush and Chris Gruetzemacher was expected to take place at the event. However, on October 19, it was reported Gruetzemacher withdrew from the event due to undisclosed reasons and was replaced by promotional newcomer Thiago Moisés.

A women's strawweight bout between Maycee Barber and Maia Stevenson was expected to take place at the event. However, on October 20, it was reported that Stevenson pulled out from the event due to injury and was replaced by promotional newcomer Hannah Cifers.

A light heavyweight bout between Alonzo Menifield and Saparbek Safarov was expected to take place at the event. However it was reported on October 21 that Safarov pulled out from the event for undisclosed reasons and the bout was scrapped.

Jordan Espinosa was expected to face Mark De La Rosa at the event. However, on November 4, it was reported that Espinosa pulled out from the event and was replaced by Joby Sanchez.

A bout between former UFC Flyweight Championship challengers Ray Borg and Joseph Benavidez was expected to take place at the event. However, Borg pulled out on November 7 due to medical issues and the bout was cancelled.

At the weigh-ins, former UFC Women's Bantamweight Championship challenger Raquel Pennington weighed in at 138 lb, 2 pounds over the bantamweight non-title fight limit of 136 lb. She was fined 20 percent of her purse, which went to her opponent former UFC Women's Featherweight Champion Germaine de Randamie and the bout proceeded at catchweight.

== Results ==
Main Card (Fox Sports 1)
| Weight class | | | | Method | Round | Time | Notes |
|---|---|---|---|---|---|---|---|
| Featherweight | Yair Rodríguez | def. | Chan Sung Jung | KO (elbow) | 5 | 4:59 | (Note: Tied for latest finish in UFC history.) |
| Welterweight | Donald Cerrone | def. | Mike Perry | Submission (armbar) | 1 | 4:46 |
| Catchweight (138 lb) | Germaine de Randamie | def. | Raquel Pennington | Decision (unanimous) (30–27, 30–27, 30–27) | 3 | 5:00 |
| Lightweight | Beneil Dariush | def. | Thiago Moisés | Decision (unanimous) (30–25, 30–25, 30–26) | 3 | 5:00 |
| Women's Strawweight | Maycee Barber | def. | Hannah Cifers | TKO (punches) | 2 | 2:01 |
| Lightweight | Michael Trizano | def. | Luis Peña | Decision (split) (28–29, 29–28, 30–27) | 3 | 5:00 |
Preliminary Card (Fox Sports 1)
| Women's Strawweight | Ashley Yoder | def. | Amanda Cooper | Decision (split) (29–28, 27–30, 29–28) | 3 | 5:00 |
| Featherweight | Bobby Moffett | vs. | Chas Skelly | No Contest (overturned) | 2 | 2:43 | (Note: Originally a technical submission (brabo choke) win for Moffett; overturned after Skelly appealed the loss due to a controversial referee call.) |
| Lightweight | Davi Ramos | def. | John Gunther | Submission (rear-naked choke) | 1 | 1:57 |
| Lightweight | Devonte Smith | def. | Julian Erosa | KO (punches) | 1 | 0:46 |
Early Preliminary Card (UFC Fight Pass)
| Flyweight | Eric Shelton | def. | Joseph Morales | Decision (split) (29–28, 27–30, 30–27) | 3 | 5:00 |
| Bantamweight | Mark De La Rosa | def. | Joby Sanchez | Decision (split) (29–28, 28–29, 30–27) | 3 | 5:00 |

== Bonus awards ==
The following fighters were awarded $50,000 bonuses:

- Fight of the Night: Yair Rodríguez vs. Chan Sung Jung
- Performance of the Night: Yair Rodríguez and Donald Cerrone

== Aftermath ==
On June 24, 2020, it was announced that Bobby Moffett's submission win against Chas Skelly was overturned by the Colorado Office of Combative Sports after Skelly appealed the loss due to a referee call. Its stoppage was considered highly controversial at the time, as the referee waved off the fight in the midst of a submission sequence.

== See also ==
- List of UFC events
- 2018 in UFC
- List of current UFC fighters
