= Jordan Espinosa =

American mixed martial artist

- Born: Jordan Andrew Espinosa; November 8, 1989 (age 36); Meriden, Connecticut, U.S.
- Height: 5 ft 7 in (1.70 m)
- Weight: 125 lb (57 kg; 8 st 13 lb)
- Division: Flyweight (2012, 2017–present); Bantamweight (2013–2017)
- Reach: 69 in (175 cm)
- Fighting out of: Albuquerque, New Mexico, United States
- Team: ABQ Kickboxing Luttrell / YEE MMA
- Years active: 2012–present

Mixed martial arts record
- Total: 26
- Wins: 15
- By knockout: 2
- By submission: 7
- By decision: 6
- Losses: 10
- By submission: 5
- By decision: 5
- No contests: 1

Amateur record
- Total: 9
- Wins: 8
- By knockout: 1
- By submission: 2
- Losses: 1
- By submission: 1

Other information
- Mixed martial arts record from Sherdog

Jordan Andrew Espinosa (born November 8, 1989) is an American mixed martial artist competing in the flyweight division. He is most notable for his time in the Ultimate Fighting Championship.

== Background ==
Espinosa wrestled at West Mesa High School in New Mexico. He won the state championship as a sophomore, placed third as a junior, and finished second his senior year. At the national level, he was a five time Southwest nationals champion.

Espinosa attended the University of New Mexico where he received a bachelor's degree in Computer Engineering.

== Mixed martial arts career ==
=== Amateur career ===
Epinosa made his amateur debut in June 2009, beginning his career as a flyweight. His third opponent was Ronnie White, whom he defeated by TKO due to punches. In his fifth amateur fight, he faced Joby Sanchez for the Que Loco CF Bantamweight title. Espinosa lost by submission in the third round. His sixth amateur fight would beagainst Jeremy Robledo. Espinosa won a unanimous decision. Espinosa achieved victory in his next three fights as well, with submission wins over Corey Cline and Noah Gagstatter, as well as a decision victory over Aaron Arvanitis. Espinosa finished his amateur career with a 8–1 record.

=== Early career ===
Espinosa made his professional debut in 2012 at Fostoria Fight Night, where he faced Joshua Killion. Espinosa won the fight by way of brabo choke.

Prior to appearing on Dana White's Contender Series, Espinosa had amassed a 10–5 record, finishing eight of his ten wins. During this time he won the TSE Bantamweight title, with a decision win over Brett Roller, and had spent the first part of his mixed martial arts career as a bantamweight, and fought two catchweight bouts.

Espinosa faced Nick Urso in a rematch on August 22, 2017, at Dana White's Contender Series 7, after their first fight in the regional circuit ended in a no contest. He won the rematch by a technical submission via a d'arce choke. However, he was not awarded a UFC contract after this win.

Espinosa then faced C.J. Hamilton at an Alliance MMA event in March 2018 and won by split decision.

Returning to the Contender Series, he fought Riley Dutro during Dana White's Contender Series 12. Espinosa won the fight by TKO at the very end of the third round. Following the win, Espinosa was awarded a UFC contract.

=== Ultimate Fighting Championship ===
Espinosa was scheduled to make his UFC debut on November 10, 2018, at UFC Fight Night: The Korean Zombie vs. Rodríguez against Mark De La Rosa. However, prior to the fight, Epsinosa suffered a knee injury and was replaced by Joby Sanchez.

Espinosa subsequently made his debut on March 23, 2019, against Eric Shelton at UFC Fight Night: Thompson vs. Pettis. Espinosa won the fight by unanimous decision.

Espinosa's next faced Matt Schnell at UFC on ESPN: Covington vs. Lawler on August 3, 2019. He lost in the first round by triangle choke submission.

Espinosa next faced Alex Perez at UFC Fight Night: Blaydes vs. dos Santos on January 25, 2020. He lost the fight in the first round by technical submission due to an arm triangle choke.

Espinosa was scheduled to face Zhalgas Zhumagulov at a UFC in Kazakhstan on June 13, 2020. However, the event for Kazakhstan was later cancelled due to the COVID-19 pandemic and moved to a location in the United States.

Espinosa faced Mark De La Rosa at UFC on ESPN: Eye vs. Calvillo on June 13, 2020. He won the fight via unanimous decision.

Espinosa faced David Dvořák on September 19, 2020, at UFC Fight Night: Covington vs. Woodley. He lost the fight via unanimous decision.

Espinosa was expected to face Tim Elliott on January 16, 2021, at UFC on ABC 1. However, Espinosa tested positive for COVID-19 in late December and the pairing was moved to UFC 259. Espinosa lost the fight via unanimous decision.

On March 11, 2021, it was announced that Espinosa was released from the UFC.

=== Post-UFC Career ===
In his first fight since leaving the UFC, Espinosa faced Jose Zarauz at Combate Global - Reyes vs. Gomez on May 20, 2022. He would lose the fight via rear-naked choke late in the second round.

== Mixed martial arts record ==
Professional record breakdown
26 matches	15 wins	10 losses
By knockout	2	0
By submission	7	5
By decision	6	5
No contests	1	

Res.	Record	Opponent	Method	Event	Date	Round	Time	Location	Notes
Loss	15–10 (1)	Jose Zarauz	Submission (rear-naked choke)	Combate Global - Reyes vs. Gomez	May 20, 2022	2	4:19	Miami, Florida, United States	
Loss	15–9 (1)	Tim Elliott	Decision (unanimous)	UFC 259	March 6, 2021	3	5:00	Las Vegas, Nevada, United States	
Loss	15–8 (1)	David Dvořák	Decision (unanimous)	UFC Fight Night: Covington vs. Woodley	September 19, 2020	3	5:00	Las Vegas, Nevada, United States	
Win	15–7 (1)	Mark De La Rosa	Decision (unanimous)	UFC on ESPN: Eye vs. Calvillo	June 13, 2020	3	5:00	Las Vegas, Nevada, United States	Bantamweight bout.
Loss	14–7 (1)	Alex Perez	Technical Submission (arm-triangle choke)	UFC Fight Night: Blaydes vs. dos Santos	January 25, 2020	1	2:33	Raleigh, North Carolina, United States	
Loss	14–6 (1)	Matt Schnell	Submission (triangle choke)	UFC on ESPN: Covington vs. Lawler	August 3, 2019	1	1:23	Newark, New Jersey, United States	
Win	14–5 (1)	Eric Shelton	Decision (unanimous)	UFC Fight Night: Thompson vs. Pettis	March 23, 2019	3	5:00	Nashville, Tennessee, United States	
Win	13–5 (1)	Riley Dutro	TKO (punches)	Dana White's Contender Series 12	July 10, 2018	3	4:58	Las Vegas, Nevada, United States	
Win	12–5 (1)	C.J. Hamilton	Decision (split)	Alliance MMA at the Arnold Sports Festival	March 3, 2018	3	5:00	Columbus, Ohio, United States	
Win	11–5 (1)	Nick Urso	Technical Submission (D'Arce choke)	Dana White's Contender Series 7	August 22, 2017	1	1:23	Las Vegas, Nevada, United States	Return to Flyweight.
Win	10–5 (1)	Bobby Escalante	Submission (brabo choke)	Global Knockout 9	March 18, 2017	1	3:30	Jackson, California, United States	Catchweight (130 lb) bout.
Loss	9–5 (1)	Dinis Paiva	Decision (unanimous)	CES MMA 41 - Bessette vs. Croom	January 27, 2017	3	5:00	Lincoln, Rhode Island, United States	
Win	9–4 (1)	Brett Roller	Decision (unanimous)	TSE - Rocky Mountain Rubicon 3	October 29, 2016	3	5:00	Fountain, Colorado, United States	Won the TSE Bantamweight Championship.
Win	8–4 (1)	John Dirham	TKO (punches)	New League Fights - The Takeover	April 16, 2016	2	1:13	Montpelier, Ohio, United States	
NC	7–4 (1)	Nick Urso	NC (illegal strikes)	Jackson's MMA Series 17	February 13, 2016	2	2:50	Santa Fe, New Mexico, United States	Flyweight bout. Espinosa was struck in the back of head.
Win	7–4	Jordan Morales	Submission (brabo choke)	PA Cage Fight 20	February 28, 2015	1	1:35	Wilkes Barre, Pennsylvania, United States	
Win	6–4	Rafael de Freitas	Decision (unanimous)	Legacy Fighting Championship 36	October 17, 2014	3	5:00	Allen, Texas, United States	Flyweight bout; Espinosa missed weight (127.2 lb).
Win	5–4	Jeremy Pender	Decision (unanimous)	Gladiators of the Cage: The Road to Glory 7	July 19, 2014	3	5:00	Cleveland, Ohio, United States	Catchweight (130 lb) bout.
Loss	4–4	Chris Dunn	Decision (unanimous)	Turf Wars 18	May 17, 2014	3	5:00	Florence, Kentucky, United States	
Win	4–3	Robert Browning	Submission (choke)	Bluegrass Brawl 12	May 9, 2014	1	2:29	Lexington, Kentucky, United States	
Loss	3–3	Rico DiSciullo	Decision (unanimous)	CES MMA 23	April 25, 2014	3	5:00	Lincoln, Rhode Island, United States	
Loss	3–2	Dominic Mazzotta	Submission (rear-naked choke)	Gladiators of the Cage: The North Shore's Rise to Power 3	December 7, 2013	2	2:57	Pittsburgh, Pennsylvania, United States	Return to Bantamweight.
Win	3–1	Tim Sosa	Submission (brabo choke)	XFC 25: Boiling Point	September 6, 2013	1	1:36	Albuquerque, New Mexico, United States	Catchweight (126.8 lb) bout; Espinosa missed weight.
Loss	2–1	Andrew Cseh	Submission (rear-naked choke)	Rocktagon MMA 26: Veni, Vidi, Vici	May 4, 2013	1	3:49	Cleveland, Ohio, United States	Bantamweight debut.
Win	2–0	David Vigil	Submission	Dollar D Promotions: Rattler Rumble	April 14, 2012	1	0:43	La Junta, Colorado, United States	Catchweight (127 lb) bout.
Win	1–0	Joshua Killion	Submission (brabo choke)	Golden Lotus Productions: Fostoria Fight Night	March 24, 2012	1	1:33	Fostoria, Ohio, United States	Flyweight debut.

== Amateur mixed martial arts record ==
Amateur record breakdown		
6 matches	5 wins	1 loss
By knockout	1	0
By submission	2	1
By decision	2	0

Res.	Record	Opponent	Method	Event	Date	Round	Time	Location	Notes
Win	5–1	Noah Gagstatter	Submission (strikes)	Kentucky Fighting Challenge 07/30/11	30 July 2011	1	2:10	Ashland, Kentucky, United States	
Win	4–1	Aaron Arvanitis	Decision (unanimous)	NAAFS Proving Ground Series 9	16 July 2011	3	3:30	Streetsboro, Ohio, United States	
Win	3–1	Corey Cline	Submission (arm-triangle choke)	Boyz Gone Bad 3	11 June 2011	1	1:39	Ashville, Ohio, United States	
Win	2–1	Jeremy Robledo	Decision (unanimous)	Campus Cage Fights	30 April 2011	5	3:00	Alamosa, Colorado, United States	Flyweight bout.
Loss	1–1	Joby Sanchez	Submission	Que Loco Cage Fighting - Unstoppable	25 September 2010	3	?	Albuquerque, New Mexico, United States	For the Que Loco CF Bantamweight title.
Win	1–0	Ronnie White	TKO (punches)	New Mexico Cage Fighting 4/17/10	17 April 2010	1	1:00	Albuquerque, New Mexico, United States	Bantamweight debut.

== See also ==
List of male mixed martial artists
