= Hannah Cifers =

American mixed martial arts fighter (born 1992)

- Born: June 26, 1992 (age 34); Oxford, North Carolina, U.S.
- Other names: Shockwave
- Height: 5 ft 1 in (1.55 m)
- Weight: 115 lb (52 kg; 8 st 3 lb)
- Division: Strawweight
- Reach: 63 in (160 cm)
- Fighting out of: Oxford, North Carolina, U.S.
- Rank: Brown belt in Brazilian Jiu-Jitsu
- Years active: 2013–present

Mixed martial arts record
- Total: 17
- Wins: 10
- By knockout: 5
- By decision: 5
- Losses: 7
- By knockout: 2
- By submission: 4
- By decision: 1

Amateur record
- Total: 5
- Wins: 4
- By knockout: 2
- By decision: 2
- Losses: 1

Other information
- Spouse: Daniel Caster
- Mixed martial arts record from Sherdog

Hannah Cifers (born June 26, 1992) is an American mixed martial artist who competes in the strawweight division. She formerly fought in the Ultimate Fighting Championship (UFC).

== Mixed martial arts career ==
=== Early career ===
Cifers made her professional MMA debut in 2013. She fought under various promotions and amassed a record of 8–2 prior to being signed by UFC.

=== Ultimate Fighting Championship ===
Cifers made her promotional debut on November 10, 2018, replacing an injured Maia Stevenson on short notice, at UFC Fight Night: Korean Zombie vs. Rodríguez against Maycee Barber. She lost the fight via technical knockout.

On March 2, 2019, Cifers faced Polyana Viana at UFC 235. She won the fight via split decision.

Cifers faced Jodie Esquibel on August 17, 2019, at UFC 241. She won the fight via unanimous decision.

Cifers was scheduled to face Brianna Van Buren on January 25, 2020, at UFC Fight Night 166. However Van Buren was pulled from the event with undisclosed reason and she was replaced by Angela Hill. She lost the fight via technical knockout in round two.

Cifers was scheduled to face Mackenzie Dern on April 25, 2020. However, on April 9 the promotion announced that the event was postponed. The pairing eventually took place on May 30, 2020, at UFC on ESPN: Woodley vs. Burns. Cifers lost the fight via a kneebar submission in round one.

Cifers made a quick turnaround just two weeks later and faced Mariya Agapova on June 13, 2020, at UFC on ESPN: Eye vs. Calvillo, two weeks after her last contest. She lost the bout via first round submission.

Cifers faced Mallory Martin on August 29, 2020, at UFC Fight Night 175. At the weigh-ins, Cifers weighed in at 117 pounds, one pound over the strawweight non-title fight limit. The bout proceeded at catchweight and she was fined 20 percent of her purse, which went to her opponent Martin. She lost the fight via rear-naked choke in round two.

Cifers was expected to face Emily Whitmire on February 27, 2021, at UFC Fight Night 186. However, Cifers pulled out due to undisclosed reasons and was replaced by Sam Hughes.

Cifers was scheduled to face Melissa Martinez on September 10, 2022, at UFC 279. However, Cifers pulled out of the bout in June for undisclosed reasons.

After the news of her pulling out of the bout, it was announced that she was no longer on the UFC roster.

== Mixed martial arts record ==
Professional record breakdown
17 matches	10 wins	7 losses
By knockout	5	2
By submission	0	4
By decision	5	1

Res.	Record	Opponent	Method	Event	Date	Round	Time	Location	Notes
Loss	10–7	Mallory Martin	Submission (rear-naked choke)	UFC Fight Night: Smith vs. Rakić	August 29, 2020	2	1:33	Las Vegas, Nevada, United States	Return to Strawweight; Cifers missed weight (117 lb).
Loss	10–6	Mariya Agapova	Submission (rear-naked choke)	UFC on ESPN: Eye vs. Calvillo	June 13, 2020	1	2:42	Las Vegas, Nevada, United States	Flyweight debut.
Loss	10–5	Mackenzie Dern	Submission (kneebar)	UFC on ESPN: Woodley vs. Burns	May 30, 2020	1	2:36	Las Vegas, Nevada, United States	
Loss	10–4	Angela Hill	TKO (elbows and punches)	UFC Fight Night: Blaydes vs. dos Santos	January 25, 2020	2	4:26	Raleigh, North Carolina, United States	
Win	10–3	Jodie Esquibel	Decision (unanimous)	UFC 241	August 17, 2019	3	5:00	Anaheim, California, United States	
Win	9–3	Polyana Viana	Decision (split)	UFC 235	March 2, 2019	3	5:00	Las Vegas, Nevada, United States	
Loss	8–3	Maycee Barber	TKO (elbows and punches)	UFC Fight Night: Korean Zombie vs. Rodríguez	November 10, 2018	2	2:01	Denver, Colorado, United States	
Win	8–2	Kali Robbins	TKO (punches)	Next Level Fight Club 9	September 22, 2018	1	4:50	Greenville, North Carolina, United States	
Win	7–2	Celine Haga	TKO (punches)	Jackson-Wink Fight Night 3	June 2, 2018	1	1:16	Albuquerque, New Mexico, United States	
Win	6–2	Thais Souza	Decision (unanimous)	Titan FC 47	December 15, 2017	3	5:00	Fort Lauderdale, Florida, United States	
Win	5–2	Andrea Soraluz	TKO (punches)	Titan FC 46	November 17, 2017	2	0:58	Pembroke Pines, Florida, United States	
Win	4–2	Nicole Smith	KO (punches)	Next Level Fight Club 8	September 16, 2017	1	1:05	Raleigh, North Carolina, United States	
Loss	3–2	Gillian Robertson	Submission (rear-naked choke)	Next Level Fight Club 7	April 17, 2017	2	4:12	Raleigh, North Carolina, United States	
Win	3–1	Ronni Nanney	Decision (unanimous)	Fight Lab 52	December 10, 2015	3	5:00	Charlotte, North Carolina, United States	
Win	2–1	Miki Rogers	Decision (unanimous)	Fight Lab 50	September 19, 2015	3	5:00	Philadelphia, Pennsylvania, United States	Return to Strawweight.
Win	1–1	Rachel Sazoff	TKO (punches)	Dead Serious MMA / XCC: Defiant	May 9, 2014	1	1:12	Greensboro, North Carolina, United States	Atomweight debut.
Loss	0–1	Heather Jo Clark	Decision (unanimous)	XFC 26: Night of Champions	October 18, 2013	3	5:00	Nashville, Tennessee, United States	Strawweight debut.

== See also ==
- List of female mixed martial artists
