= Joseph Benavidez =

American mixed martial artist

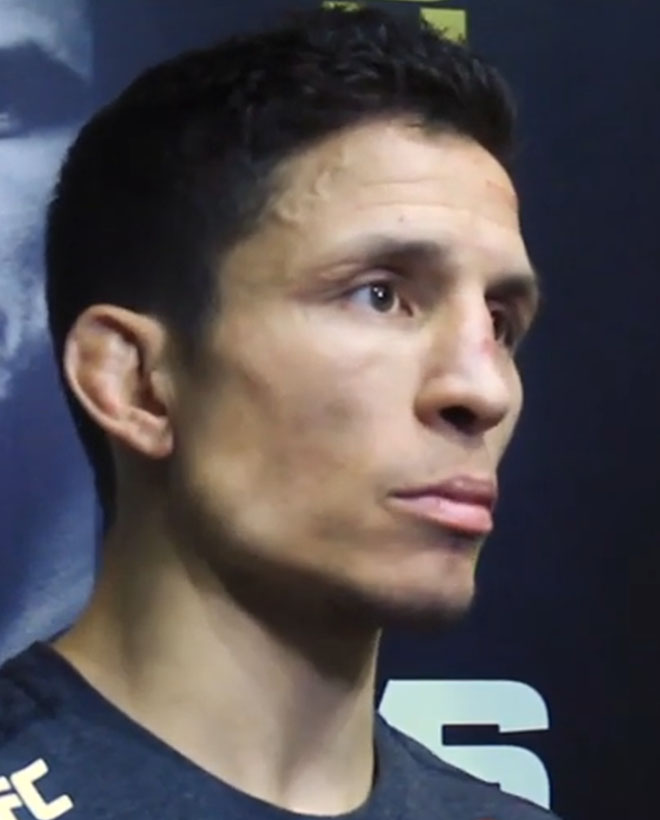
- Benavidez at UFC Fight Night 143 in New York, United States on January 20, 2019
- Born: Joseph Rolando Benavidez; July 31, 1984 (age 42); San Antonio, Texas, U.S.
- Height: 5 ft 4 in (1.63 m)
- Weight: 125 lb (57 kg; 8.9 st)
- Division: Flyweight (2012–2021); Bantamweight (2006–2011); Featherweight (2008)
- Reach: 65 in (165 cm)
- Fighting out of: Sacramento, California, U.S.
- Team: Team Alpha Male (2007–2016); Elevation Fight Team (2016); Xtreme Couture (2016–2021)
- Rank: Brown prajied in Muay Thai under Duane Ludwig
- Years active: 2006–2021

Mixed martial arts record
- Total: 36
- Wins: 28
- By knockout: 8
- By submission: 9
- By decision: 11
- Losses: 8
- By knockout: 2
- By submission: 1
- By decision: 5

Other information
- Spouse: Megan Olivi
- Mixed martial arts record from Sherdog

Joseph Rolando Benavidez (born July 31, 1984) is an American former professional mixed martial artist. He competed in the Bantamweight division in the WEC, and primarily in the Flyweight division for the Ultimate Fighting Championship (UFC).

Joseph Benavidez fought 36 MMA matches, and he won 28 of those bouts. He competed in the flyweight division and the bantamweight division. Benavidez entered five title matches between the years 2009 and 2020, but lost all five contests. He challenged for the bantamweight belt once and fought for the UFC flyweight belt four times. Benavidez never won a championship.

== Background ==
Benavidez was born on July 31, 1984, in San Antonio, Texas, and is of Mexican descent. Benavidez grew up with his single mother and two brothers. He attended Las Cruces High School, where he began training in Boxing and Wrestling. in which he became a New Mexico State champion. He continued to wrestle for one semester at William Penn University before dropping out. From college onwards Benavidez struggled with alcohol and drug abuse before becoming sober, subsequently turning his interest into mixed martial arts.

After fighting in smaller shows while working as a screen printer in Las Cruces, New Mexico, he joined up with Urijah Faber's Team Alpha Male in 2007. Benavidez has since fought in Dream, WEC and most recently the UFC. His fighting style has drawn comparisons to training partner and former WEC Featherweight Champion Urijah Faber. On April 27, 2010, the Mayor and City Council of the City of Las Cruces proclaimed April 27 as Joseph Benavidez Day in Las Cruces.

== Mixed martial arts career ==
=== Team Alpha Male ===
Before joining up with Urijah Faber, Benavidez fought in smaller shows and trained while working as a screen printer in New Mexico. Hoping to eventually make a living fighting MMA, he sought out Faber on a trip to California in January 2007. Unable to find Faber's gym, he visited one in Roseville hoping to locate him. There his fighting ability impressed the members and instructors enough (or, in Faber's words: "[he] basically beat the crap out of everyone") to refer him to Faber. This was only hours before Benavidez' flight home was due and he had to leave for the airport, unable to meet up with him.

"I had finally found him, and it was at the end of my vacation. I went to airport and my friends dropped me off; [I] was ready to go back to New Mexico and my regular life."

His flight was then canceled, giving him the chance to meet up with Faber as he had hoped. Benavidez impressed Faber enough to offer him a job at the front desk of his gym, enabling him to leave New Mexico to come train with him and his team. Benavidez then went back to New Mexico, "jammed everything into his car" and moved to California. After fighting with smaller US-based promotions, Benavidez was offered a fight with Norifumi Yamamoto by Japanese MMA-promoter Dream in July 2008 at Dream 5. The bout was canceled only days before the fight, and Benavidez was instead matched against Junya Kodo whom he defeated by guillotine choke submission.

=== World Extreme Cagefighting ===
Benavidez was then signed by US-based World Extreme Cagefighting. On December 3, 2008, he fought Danny Martinez at WEC 37 and won by unanimous decision.

Benavidez faced Jeff Curran on April 5, 2009, at WEC 40. Benavidez dominated Curran from the opening bell with superior grappling and striking, knocking the opponent down in the first round. Curran unsuccessfully attempted an armbar in the second round and a triangle choke in the third round.

Next, Benavidez faced Dominick Cruz on August 9, 2009, at WEC 42. He lost the fight by unanimous decision.

Benavidez fought Brazilian jiu-jitsu ace Rani Yahya on December 19, 2009, at WEC 45. Benavidez won via first round TKO.

Benavidez defeated former WEC Bantamweight Champion Miguel Torres on March 6, 2010, at WEC 47. He dominated the former Bantamweight Champion before opening a huge cut on Torres' forehead and submitting the bloodied Torres via guillotine choke.

=== Bantamweight title shot and beyond ===
Benavidez fought Dominick Cruz in a rematch for the WEC Bantamweight Championship on August 18, 2010, at WEC 50. Benavidez lost to Cruz for a second time via split decision.

Benavidez faced Wagnney Fabiano on November 11, 2010, replacing an injured Brian Bowles. Benavidez defeated Fabiano via second round submission. After an uneventful first round of striking between the two, Benavidez stung Fabiano with a left and pounced, submitting the 3rd degree black belt with a guillotine choke at 2:45 of the second round.

=== Ultimate Fighting Championship ===
==== 2011 ====
On October 28, 2010, World Extreme Cagefighting merged with the Ultimate Fighting Championship. As part of the merger, all WEC fighters were transferred to the UFC.

In his UFC debut, Benavidez faced Ian Loveland on March 19, 2011, at UFC 128. He won the fight via unanimous decision.

Benavidez next fought Eddie Wineland on August 14, 2011, at UFC on Versus 5. Benavidez defeated Wineland by unanimous decision (30-27, 30-27, 30-27).

==== 2012 ====
At the UFC 140 post-fight press conference, Dana White announced that Benavidez would be a participant in a four man tournament to crown the new newly created UFC Flyweight Championship. Benavidez faced Yasuhiro Urushitani on March 3, 2012, at UFC on FX 2 and won via TKO in the second round, earning Knockout of the Night honors for his performance.

Benavidez faced Demetrious Johnson on September 22, 2012, at UFC 152 for the inaugural UFC Flyweight Championship. In an incredibly closely contested fight that contained nonstop action at a frenetic pace, he lost the fight in via split decision (48-47, 47-48, 49-46).

==== 2013 ====
Benavidez faced Ian McCall on February 2, 2013, at UFC 156. He won the fight via unanimous decision.

Benavidez then faced Darren Uyenoyama on April 20, 2013, at UFC on Fox 7. He won the fight via TKO in the second round.

Benavidez faced Jussier Formiga on September 4, 2013, at UFC Fight Night 28. He won the fight by TKO in round 1 after dropping Formiga with a knee to the body and following up with punches.

A rematch with Demetrious Johnson was expected for November 30, 2013, at The Ultimate Fighter 18 Finale. However the bout was shifted to December 14, 2013, at UFC on Fox 9 after that event's headliner was postponed due to injury. Benavidez lost via knockout in the first round, the first time he has been stopped in his MMA career.

==== 2014 ====
Benavidez faced Tim Elliott on April 26, 2014, at UFC 172. Benavidez won the fight in the first round via modified guillotine choke. Elliot was forced to tap with his feet as his arms were trapped by Benavidez's legs. Benavidez has called this submission the "Joa Constrictor". The win also earned Benavidez his first Performance of the Night bonus award.

Benavidez faced Dustin Ortiz on November 22, 2014, at UFC Fight Night 57. Benavidez won the back-and-forth fight via unanimous decision.

==== 2015 ====
Benavidez faced John Moraga on May 23, 2015, at UFC 187. Benavidez won the fight via unanimous decision.

Benavidez was briefly linked to a bout against former Olympic Gold Medalist Henry Cejudo on September 5, 2015, at UFC 191. However, the fight never materialized. In turn, Benavidez faced Ali Bagautinov on October 3, 2015, at UFC 192. Benavidez won the fight via unanimous decision.

==== 2016 ====
Benavidez faced Zach Makovsky on February 6, 2016, at UFC Fight Night 82. He won the fight via unanimous decision.

In May 2016, the UFC announced that Benavidez would be one of the coaches, opposite Henry Cejudo on The Ultimate Fighter 24. The pairing faced each other on December 3, 2016, at The Ultimate Fighter 24 Finale. Benavidez won the back and forth fight via split decision.

==== 2017 ====
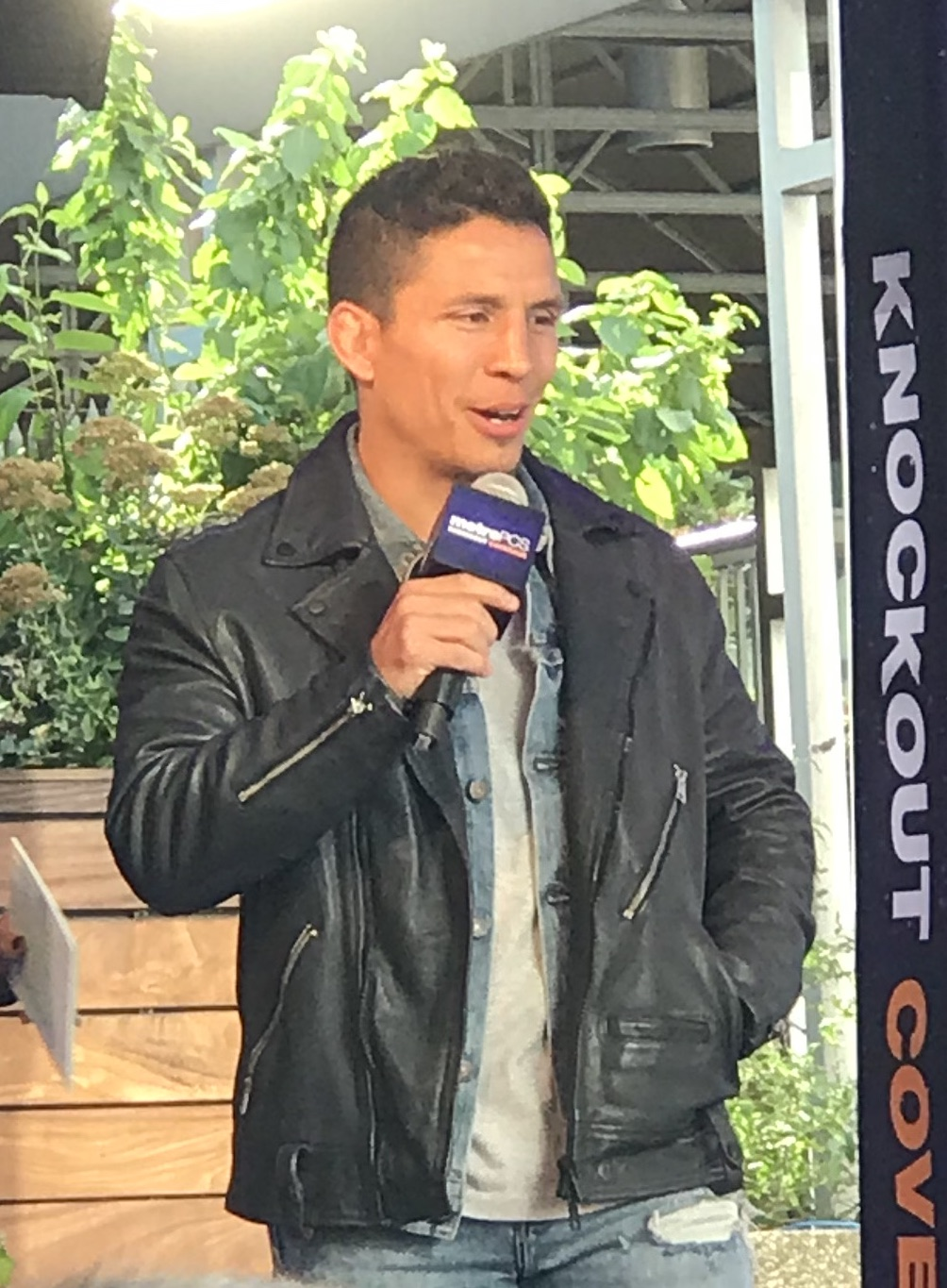
Joseph Benavidez in 2017

Benevidez was expected to face Ben Nguyen on June 11, 2017, at UFC Fight Night 110. However, Benavidez pulled out of the fight on May 10 with a knee injury and was replaced by Tim Elliott.

==== 2018 ====
Benavidez faced Sergio Pettis on June 9, 2018, at UFC 225. He lost the back and forth fight via split decision.

Benavidez was expected to face Ray Borg on November 10, 2018, at UFC Fight Night 139. However on November 7, 2018, it was reported that the bout was cancelled due to undisclosed medical issue for Borg.

Benavidez faced Alex Perez on November 30, 2018, at The Ultimate Fighter 28 Finale. He won the fight via technical knockout out in round one. This win earned him the Performance of the Night award.

==== 2019 ====
Benavidez was briefly scheduled to face Deiveson Figueiredo on January 19, 2019, at UFC Fight Night 143. However, the promotion clarified plans indicating that the pairing was off and that Benavidez would be an alternate for the headliner bout in the event that either Henry Cejudo or T.J. Dillashaw would be forced from the main event. Subsequently, Benavidez indicated that he would like to compete on the card, so while being an alternate for the headliner, a rematch with Dustin Ortiz took place at the event. Benavidez would win the fight via unanimous decision. Benavidez signed a new, four-fight contract with the UFC before the fight with Ortiz.

Benavidez faced Jussier Formiga in a rematch on June 29, 2019, at UFC on ESPN 3. He won the fight via technical knockout in the second round. This fight earned him the Performance of the Night award. After the fight, in the post-fight interview, he declared himself "Joey Two Times".

==== 2020 ====
Benavidez fought Deiveson Figueiredo for the vacant UFC Flyweight Championship at UFC Fight Night 169 on February 29, 2020. At the weigh-ins on February 28, Figueiredo missed weight, weighing in at 127.5 pounds and became ineligible to win the Flyweight championship. In addition, Figueiredo was fined 30 percent of his purse which went to Benavidez. Benavidez lost the fight by TKO in round two.

Benavidez rematched with Deiveson Figueiredo for the vacant UFC Flyweight Championship at UFC Fight Night 172 on July 19, 2020. On July 11, 2020, Figueiredo tested positive for COVID-19. According to Figueiredo's manager, the bout had yet to be officially removed and Figueiredo was administered a second COVID-19 test on July 12, 2020, where the result would be back on July 13, 2020, to determined if Figueiredo was free to fight. Figueiredo passed multiple COVID-19 tests, clearing the fight to proceed as the main event. Benavidez lost the fight via a technical submission in round one.

==== 2021 ====
Benavidez faced off against Askar Askarov on March 6, 2021, at UFC 259. At the weigh-ins, Askar weighed in at 127 pounds, one pound over the flyweight non-title fight limit. The bout proceeded at a catchweight and Askarov was fined a percentage of his individual purse, which went to Benavidez. Benavidez lost the fight via unanimous decision.

In September 2021, Benavidez announced that he was retiring from MMA.

== Personal life ==
Benavidez is married to UFC reporter Megan Olivi.

== Championships & accomplishments ==
=== Mixed martial arts ===
- Ultimate Fighting Championship
  - Knockout of the Night (One time) vs. Yasuhiro Urushitani
  - Performance of the Night (Three times) vs. Tim Elliott, Alex Perez and Jussier Formiga
  - Tied (Demetrious Johnson) for second most wins in UFC Flyweight division history (13) (behind Alexandre Pantoja)
  - Second most knockouts in UFC Flyweight division history (5) (behind Manel Kape)
  - Tied (Alexandre Pantoja) for the third most bouts in UFC Flyweight division history (19)
  - Tied (Tim Elliott, Joshua Van & Kyoji Horiguchi) for most decision wins in UFC Flyweight division history (7)
  - Fifth longest win streak in UFC Flyweight division history (6)
  - Tied (Brandon Moreno, Tatsuro Taira & Manel Kape) for fourth most finishes in UFC Flyweight division history (6)
  - UFC.com Awards
    - 2012: ranked No. 7 Fight of the Year vs. Demetrious Johnson 1
    - 2014: ranked No. 10 Submission of the Year vs. Tim Elliott
- World Extreme Cagefighting
  - Fight of the Night (One time) vs. Dominick Cruz
  - Submission of the Night (One time) vs. Miguel Torres
- Sherdog
  - 2010 All-Violence Second Team

== Mixed martial arts record ==
Professional record breakdown
36 matches	28 wins	8 losses
By knockout	8	2
By submission	9	1
By decision	11	5

Res.	Record	Opponent	Method	Event	Date	Round	Time	Location	Notes
Loss	28–8	Askar Askarov	Decision (unanimous)	UFC 259	March 6, 2021	3	5:00	Las Vegas, Nevada, United States	Catchweight (127 lb) bout; Askarov missed weight.
Loss	28–7	Deiveson Figueiredo	Technical Submission (rear-naked choke)	UFC Fight Night: Figueiredo vs. Benavidez 2	July 19, 2020	1	4:48	Abu Dhabi, United Arab Emirates	For the vacant UFC Flyweight Championship.
Loss	28–6	Deiveson Figueiredo	TKO (punches)	UFC Fight Night: Benavidez vs. Figueiredo	February 29, 2020	2	1:54	Norfolk, Virginia, United States	For the vacant UFC Flyweight Championship. Figueiredo missed weight (127.5 lb) and became ineligible to win the title.
Win	28–5	Jussier Formiga	TKO (head kick and punches)	UFC on ESPN: Ngannou vs. dos Santos	June 29, 2019	2	4:47	Minneapolis, Minnesota, United States	Performance of the Night.
Win	27–5	Dustin Ortiz	Decision (unanimous)	UFC Fight Night: Cejudo vs. Dillashaw	January 19, 2019	3	5:00	Brooklyn, New York, United States	
Win	26–5	Alex Perez	TKO (punches)	The Ultimate Fighter: Heavy Hitters Finale	November 30, 2018	1	4:21	Las Vegas, Nevada, United States	Performance of the Night.
Loss	25–5	Sergio Pettis	Decision (split)	UFC 225	June 9, 2018	3	5:00	Chicago, Illinois, United States	
Win	25–4	Henry Cejudo	Decision (split)	The Ultimate Fighter: Tournament of Champions Finale	December 3, 2016	3	5:00	Las Vegas, Nevada, United States	Cejudo was deducted one point in round 1 due to repeated low blows.
Win	24–4	Zach Makovsky	Decision (unanimous)	UFC Fight Night: Hendricks vs. Thompson	February 6, 2016	3	5:00	Las Vegas, Nevada, United States	
Win	23–4	Ali Bagautinov	Decision (unanimous)	UFC 192	October 3, 2015	3	5:00	Houston, Texas, United States	
Win	22–4	John Moraga	Decision (unanimous)	UFC 187	May 23, 2015	3	5:00	Las Vegas, Nevada, United States	
Win	21–4	Dustin Ortiz	Decision (unanimous)	UFC Fight Night: Edgar vs. Swanson	November 22, 2014	3	5:00	Austin, Texas, United States	
Win	20–4	Tim Elliott	Submission (guillotine choke)	UFC 172	April 26, 2014	1	4:08	Baltimore, Maryland, United States	Performance of the Night.
Loss	19–4	Demetrious Johnson	KO (punch)	UFC on Fox: Johnson vs. Benavidez 2	December 14, 2013	1	2:08	Sacramento, California, United States	For the UFC Flyweight Championship.
Win	19–3	Jussier Formiga	TKO (knee to the body and punches)	UFC Fight Night: Teixeira vs. Bader	September 4, 2013	1	3:07	Belo Horizonte, Brazil	
Win	18–3	Darren Uyenoyama	TKO (body punches)	UFC on Fox: Henderson vs. Melendez	April 20, 2013	2	4:50	San Jose, California, United States	
Win	17–3	Ian McCall	Decision (unanimous)	UFC 156	February 2, 2013	3	5:00	Las Vegas, Nevada, United States	
Loss	16–3	Demetrious Johnson	Decision (split)	UFC 152	September 22, 2012	5	5:00	Toronto, Ontario, Canada	For the inaugural UFC Flyweight Championship. UFC Flyweight tournament final.
Win	16–2	Yasuhiro Urushitani	TKO (punches)	UFC on FX: Alves vs. Kampmann	March 3, 2012	2	0:11	Sydney, Australia	Flyweight debut. UFC Flyweight tournament semifinal. Knockout of the Night.
Win	15–2	Eddie Wineland	Decision (unanimous)	UFC Live: Hardy vs. Lytle	August 14, 2011	3	5:00	Milwaukee, Wisconsin, United States	
Win	14–2	Ian Loveland	Decision (unanimous)	UFC 128	March 19, 2011	3	5:00	Newark, New Jersey, United States	
Win	13–2	Wagnney Fabiano	Submission (guillotine choke)	WEC 52	November 11, 2010	2	2:45	Las Vegas, Nevada, United States	
Loss	12–2	Dominick Cruz	Decision (split)	WEC 50	August 18, 2010	5	5:00	Las Vegas, Nevada, United States	For the WEC Bantamweight Championship.
Win	12–1	Miguel Torres	Submission (guillotine choke)	WEC 47	March 6, 2010	2	2:57	Columbus, Ohio, United States	Submission of the Night.
Win	11–1	Rani Yahya	TKO (punches)	WEC 45	December 19, 2009	1	1:35	Las Vegas, Nevada, United States	
Loss	10–1	Dominick Cruz	Decision (unanimous)	WEC 42	August 9, 2009	3	5:00	Las Vegas, Nevada, United States	Fight of the Night.
Win	10–0	Jeff Curran	Decision (unanimous)	WEC 40	April 5, 2009	3	5:00	Chicago, Illinois, United States	
Win	9–0	Danny Martinez	Decision (unanimous)	WEC 37	December 3, 2008	3	5:00	Las Vegas, Nevada, United States	
Win	8–0	Junya Kodo	Submission (guillotine choke)	Dream 5	July 21, 2008	1	2:42	Osaka, Japan	Catchweight (139 lb) bout.
Win	7–0	Maurice Eazel	Submission (rear-naked choke)	PFC 8: A Night of Champions	May 8, 2008	1	1:02	Lemoore, California, United States	
Win	6–0	Jason Georgianna	Submission (guillotine choke)	PFC 6: No Retreat, No Surrender	January 17, 2008	2	0:38	Lemoore, California, United States	
Win	5–0	Rocky Del Monte	Submission (triangle choke)	Independent Event	June 1, 2007	2	N/A	Lakeport, California, United States	
Win	4–0	Carlos Lovio	TKO (punches)	Bring it On: Under Destruction	April 28, 2007	1	N/A	Oxnard, California, United States	
Win	3–0	Justin Smitley	TKO (doctor stoppage)	Warrior Cup 2	April 7, 2007	3	2:18	Stockton, California, United States	
Win	2–0	Ramon Rodriguez	Submission (triangle choke)	Border Warz	October 14, 2006	2	2:33	Colorado Springs, Colorado, United States	
Win	1–0	Brandon Shelton	Submission (kimura)	Universal Fight Promotions	June 3, 2006	2	N/A	Mescalero, New Mexico, United States	

== See also ==
- List of male mixed martial artists
