= Mark De La Rosa =

American mixed martial artist

- Born: August 31, 1994 (age 32); Fort Worth, Texas, United States
- Other names: Bumblebee
- Height: 5 ft 6 in (1.68 m)
- Weight: 135.5 lb (61 kg; 9 st 10 lb)
- Division: Flyweight; Bantamweight
- Reach: 65 in (165 cm)
- Fighting out of: Fort Worth, Texas, United States
- Team: Factory X Genesis MMA
- Rank: Black belt in Brazilian Jiu-Jitsu
- Years active: 2014–present

Mixed martial arts record
- Total: 16
- Wins: 11
- By knockout: 1
- By submission: 6
- By decision: 4
- Losses: 5
- By knockout: 1
- By submission: 1
- By decision: 3

Other information
- Spouse: Montana De La Rosa
- Mixed martial arts record from Sherdog

Mark De La Rosa (born August 31, 1994) is an American mixed martial artist (MMA) who fights in the flyweight division. He competed in the Ultimate Fighting Championship (UFC).

== Background ==
De La Rosa was born in Fort Worth, Texas in the United States. He started training in jiu-jitsu at the age of 12 to lose weight and became a jiu-jitsu coach three years later before subsequently transitioning to MMA.

== Mixed martial arts career ==
=== Early career ===
De La Rosa began his professional MMA career in 2014. He was the Superior Combative Championships bantamweight champion and amassed a record of 9–1 prior to signing with the UFC.

=== Ultimate Fighting Championship ===
De La Rosa made his UFC debut on December 30, 2017, on UFC 219 against Tim Elliott. He lost the fight via a submission in round two.

De La Rosa's next fight came on July 14, 2018, at UFC Fight Night: dos Santos vs. Ivanov against Elias Garcia. He won the fight via a rear-naked choke submission in round two.

On November 10, 2018, De La Rosa faced Joby Sanchez at UFC Fight Night: The Korean Zombie vs. Rodríguez. He won the fight via unanimous decision.

De La Rosa faced Alex Perez in a bantamweight bout on March 30, 2019, at UFC on ESPN 2. He lost the fight via unanimous decision.

De La Rosa faced Kai Kara-France on August 31, 2019, at UFC Fight Night 157. He lost the fight via unanimous decision.

De La Rosa faced Raulian Paiva on February 15, 2020, at UFC Fight Night 167. He lost the fight via knockout in the second round.

De La Rosa faced Jordan Espinosa on June 13, 2020, at UFC on ESPN: Eye vs. Calvillo. He lost the fight via unanimous decision.

After his fourth straight loss, the UFC had announced that his contract had ended and he was not renewed.

== Championships and accomplishments ==
=== Mixed martial arts ===
- Superior Combative Championships
  - Superior Combative Championships Bantamweight Championship (One time) vs. Arthur Oliveira

== Personal life ==
De La Rosa is married to Montana De La Rosa, who is a UFC fighter. He is a stepfather to Montana's daughter named Zaylyn.

== Mixed martial arts record ==
Professional record breakdown
16 matches	11 wins	5 losses
By knockout	1	1
By submission	6	1
By decision	4	3

Res.	Record	Opponent	Method	Event	Date	Round	Time	Location	Notes
Loss	11–5	Jordan Espinosa	Decision (unanimous)	UFC on ESPN: Eye vs. Calvillo	June 13, 2020	3	5:00	Las Vegas, Nevada, United States	Bantamweight bout.
Loss	11–4	Raulian Paiva	KO (punches)	UFC Fight Night: Anderson vs. Błachowicz 2	February 15, 2020	2	4:42	Rio Rancho, New Mexico, United States	
Loss	11–3	Kai Kara-France	Decision (unanimous)	UFC Fight Night: Andrade vs. Zhang	August 31, 2019	3	5:00	Shenzhen, China	Return to Flyweight.
Loss	11–2	Alex Perez	Decision (unanimous)	UFC on ESPN: Barboza vs. Gaethje	March 30, 2019	3	5:00	Philadelphia, Pennsylvania, United States	
Win	11–1	Joby Sanchez	Decision (split)	UFC Fight Night: The Korean Zombie vs. Rodríguez	November 10, 2018	3	5:00	Denver, Colorado, United States	Return to Bantamweight.
Win	10–1	Elias Garcia	Submission (rear-naked choke)	UFC Fight Night: dos Santos vs. Ivanov	July 14, 2018	2	2:00	Boise, Idaho, United States	Flyweight debut.
Loss	9–1	Tim Elliott	Submission (anaconda choke)	UFC 219	December 30, 2017	2	1:41	Las Vegas, Nevada, United States	
Win	9–0	Mahatma Chit-Bala Garcia Avalos	Submission (rear-naked choke)	Combate Americas 15	June 30, 2017	3	2:36	Mexico City, Mexico	
Win	8–0	Ivan Hernandez Flores	Submission (arm-triangle choke)	Combate Americas 10	January 19, 2017	2	3:11	Mexico City, Mexico	
Win	7–0	Arthur Oliveira	Decision (unanimous)	Superior Combative Championships	April 2, 2016	5	5:00	Fort Worth, Texas, United States	Won the vacant SCC Bantamweight Championship.
Win	6–0	Kashiff Solarin	Submission (rear-naked choke)	Dominion Warrior Tri Combat	January 9, 2016	1	2:58	Dallas, Texas, United States	Won the DWFC Bantamweight Championship.
Win	5–0	Joseph Sandoval	Submission (rear-naked choke)	Xtreme Knockout 28	December 5, 2015	1	1:25	Dallas, Texas, United States	
Win	4–0	Xavier Siller	TKO (punches)	Premier Fight Series 4	June 13, 2015	2	4:22	Midland, Texas, United States	
Win	3–0	Keeton Gorton	Decision (split)	Legacy Fighting Championship 38	February 13, 2015	3	5:00	Allen, Texas, United States	
Win	2–0	Michael Brasher	Decision (unanimous)	Xtreme Knockout 23	October 18, 2014	3	3:00	Arlington, Texas, United States	
Win	1–0	Marcus Huerta	Submission (rear-naked choke)	24/7 Entertainment 17	September 6, 2014	1	1:38	Midland, Texas, United States	Bantamweight debut; De La Rosa missed weight (136.8 lbs).

== See also ==
- List of male mixed martial artists
