= Dominick Cruz =

American mixed martial artist (born 1985)

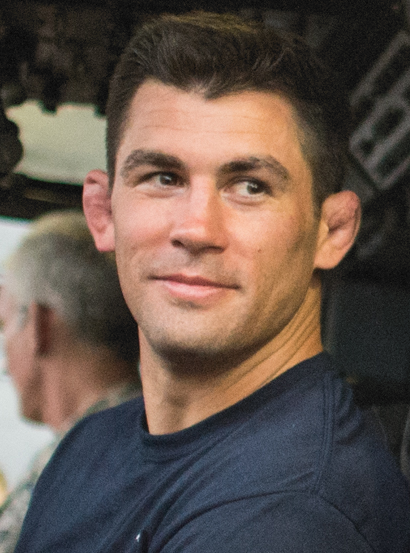
- Cruz in 2017
- Born: Dominick Rojelio Cruz; March 9, 1985 (age 41); San Diego, California, U.S.
- Nickname: The Dominator
- Height: 5 ft 8 in (1.73 m)
- Weight: 135 lb (61 kg; 9.6 st)
- Division: Bantamweight (2008–2025); Featherweight (2006–2008); Lightweight (2005–2006)
- Reach: 68 in (173 cm)
- Fighting out of: San Diego, California, U.S.
- Team: Alliance MMA (2006–2025)
- Rank: Blue belt in Brazilian Jiu-Jitsu under Lloyd Irvin
- Years active: 2005–2022

Mixed martial arts record
- Total: 28
- Wins: 24
- By knockout: 7
- By submission: 1
- By decision: 16
- Losses: 4
- By knockout: 2
- By submission: 1
- By decision: 1

Other information
- Website: dominickcruzmma.com
- Mixed martial arts record from Sherdog

Dominick Rojelio Cruz (born March 9, 1985) is an American former professional mixed martial artist, sports analyst, and color commentator. He competed in the Bantamweight division of the Ultimate Fighting Championship (UFC), where he was the inaugural and two-time Bantamweight Champion. Cruz has also competed for World Extreme Cagefighting (WEC), and was the final WEC Bantamweight Champion. He is considered to be one of the greatest bantamweight fighters of all time.

Cruz is noted for his unorthodox movement, powerful wrestling base, quick striking, and his tendency to attack from angles in a fashion unlike any other fighter on the UFC roster. He won the WEC bantamweight title in March 2010, and won the inaugural UFC Bantamweight Championship the following December. After defending the belt twice in 2011, Cruz was sidelined by injuries in 2012 and subsequently stripped of the title in 2014. On January 17, 2016, he regained the bantamweight championship with a split-decision win over T.J. Dillashaw. Numerous media outlets called this victory the greatest comeback story in MMA history.

According to Fight Matrix, Cruz is ranked as the greatest bantamweight of all time, having recorded five lineal title defenses across two championship reigns. In 2026, he was inducted into the UFC Hall of Fame.

== Early life ==
Cruz was born in San Diego, California, and is of Mexican descent. He lived with his single mother, grandmother, and brother in a trailer park in Tucson for most of his childhood. He started wrestling in seventh grade and competed all through high school out of Flowing Wells High School. After an injury that came in his senior year, he lost the opportunity of receiving a scholarship to wrestle at the University of Northern Colorado. Cruz worked as a customer service representative at Lowe's, and was studying to be a firefighter at Pima Community College before becoming a full time fighter.

== Mixed martial arts career ==
=== Early career ===
Cruz began his professional mixed martial arts (MMA) career in 2005, competing in the Rage in the Cage and Total Combat organizations. He amassed a record of 9–0 before joining World Extreme Cagefighting (WEC).

=== World Extreme Cagefighting ===
His first fight in the WEC was at featherweight at WEC 26 in a title fight against Urijah Faber in which he lost by guillotine choke in the first round. The fight would become the beginning of a longstanding cantankerous rivalry between the two.

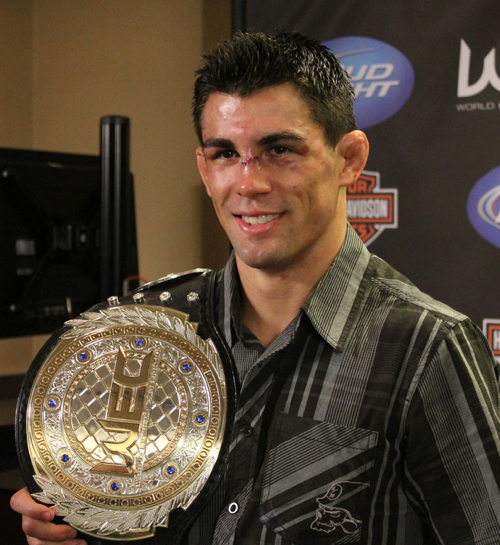
Dominick Cruz after retaining his WEC Bantamweight Championship at WEC 50 in August 2010

He would then make his debut for the WEC's 135 lb bantamweight division on June 7, 2008, at WEC 34 defeating Charlie Valencia by unanimous decision.

Cruz went on to take decision victories against Ian McCall on January 25, 2009, at WEC 38 and April 5, 2009, Ivan Lopez at WEC 40.

Cruz defeated Joseph Benavidez on August 9, 2009, at WEC 42 by unanimous decision. Both participants were awarded Fight of the Night honors.

==== WEC Bantamweight Championship ====
Riding a four-fight win streak, Cruz was presented with a title shot against the reigning WEC Bantamweight Champion Brian Bowles. The bout took place at WEC 47 on March 6, 2010. Cruz won the bout via TKO after Bowles was unable to continue after the second round after breaking his hand. Cruz became the new WEC Bantamweight Champion.

Cruz made his first title defense against Joseph Benavidez on August 18, 2010, at WEC 50. Cruz broke his left hand in the fight. The bout was a rematch of their contest at WEC 42, in which Cruz handed Benavidez his first career loss, via decision. Cruz defeated Benavidez again via split decision and retained his title.

Cruz faced Scott Jorgensen on December 14, 2010, at WEC 53 for both the WEC Bantamweight Championship and the newly created UFC Bantamweight Championship. This bout would be the final Bantamweight Championship fight under the WEC banner and would also crown the inaugural UFC Bantamweight champion, making this the only UFC title fight to take place outside of the UFC. Cruz defeated Jorgensen via unanimous decision to retain the WEC Bantamweight Championship and become the first UFC Bantamweight Champion.

=== Ultimate Fighting Championship ===
==== Bantamweight Championship ====
On October 28, 2010, World Extreme Cagefighting merged with the Ultimate Fighting Championship (UFC). As part of the merger, all WEC fighters were transferred to the UFC.

A rematch with Urijah Faber took place on July 2, 2011, at UFC 132 being the first defense of the new UFC Bantamweight title. In a closely contested fight which saw Faber drop Cruz multiple times with strikes and Cruz landing multiple leg\body kicks, knees and takedowns, Cruz defeated Faber via unanimous decision to retain his championship and avenge the only loss on his record at that time.

Cruz defeated Demetrious Johnson via unanimous decision on October 1, 2011, at UFC on Versus 6, his second UFC title defense. Cruz broke his right hand in the first round. Cruz was expected to face Urijah Faber for a third time for the UFC bantamweight championship after Faber defeated Brian Bowles at UFC 139 in a bantamweight title eliminator bout.

==== String of injuries ====
In December 2011, Cruz was selected to coach The Ultimate Fighter: Live against opposing coach Urijah Faber. The rubber match between Cruz and Faber was expected to take place on July 7, 2012, at UFC 148. However, on May 7, 2012, Cruz was forced to pull out of the bout citing a torn ACL.

On December 3, 2012, it was revealed that Cruz underwent another ACL surgery after his body rejected one from a cadaver, with an expected recovery time of six to nine months.

Cruz was scheduled to make his return on February 1, 2014, at UFC 169 in a unification bout with interim UFC Bantamweight Champion Renan Barão. However, on a January 6 episode of SportsCenter, UFC president Dana White announced that Dominick Cruz had torn his groin and vacated the UFC Bantamweight Championship; White promoted Barão to undisputed UFC Bantamweight Champion, and announced that Barão's first unified title defense would be against Urijah Faber at UFC 169.

After nearly three years away from the sport due to injuries, Cruz returned to the octagon on September 27, 2014, at UFC 178 where he faced Takeya Mizugaki. Cruz won the fight by KO in the first round by punches after getting a takedown. The win also earned Cruz his first Performance of the Night bonus award. At the post-fight press conference, Dana White confirmed that Cruz's next fight would be for the Bantamweight Championship against T.J. Dillashaw.

Subsequently, on December 22, 2014, Cruz indicated that he had torn the ACL in his other knee, which sidelined him through 2015.

==== Regaining the championship ====
After over four years since his last title fight, Cruz faced T.J. Dillashaw on January 17, 2016, at UFC Fight Night 81. He regained the title with a split-decision victory. Both participants were awarded Fight of the Night honors. Many have cited the return and victory as one of the greatest comebacks in MMA history.

To complete their trilogy, Cruz defended his title against Urijah Faber on June 4, 2016, at UFC 199. He won the fight by unanimous decision.

==== Injuries and losing the title ====
Cruz faced Cody Garbrandt on December 30, 2016, at UFC 207. After getting knocked down multiple times during the bout, Cruz lost the bout by unanimous decision. This was the first loss for Cruz in nearly 10 years. Months later, on The Joe Rogan Experience, Cruz revealed that he was plagued by plantar fascia tendinitis throughout training camp that made it difficult for him to walk at times.

Cruz was expected to face Jimmie Rivera on December 30, 2017, at UFC 219, however, on November 8, it was reported Cruz suffered a broken arm and he was forced to pull from the card.

Cruz was expected to face John Lineker on January 26, 2019 at UFC 233. It was reported on December 11, 2018 that Cruz injured his shoulder and pulled out of the fight. Subsequently, Cruz indicated that he expects to be out of competition for another year.

After more than a 3 year-layoff, Cruz replaced José Aldo and faced Henry Cejudo for the UFC Bantamweight Championship on May 9, 2020 at UFC 249. Cruz lost via TKO in the second round.

Cruz faced Casey Kenney on March 6, 2021 at UFC 259. He won the fight via split decision.

Cruz faced Pedro Munhoz on December 11, 2021 at UFC 269. He won the fight via unanimous decision despite getting knocked down twice during the opening round. The bout earned the Fight of the Night bonus award.

Cruz faced Marlon Vera on August 13, 2022 at UFC on ESPN 41. He lost the fight by knockout via a head kick in round four.

==== Retirement ====
After over a two year absence, Cruz was scheduled to face Rob Font on February 22, 2025, at UFC Fight Night 252. However, Cruz withdrew from the fight due to a shoulder injury, and announced his retirement from competition.

==== Hall of Fame ====
During UFC 324's broadcast, Cruz was announced as the next "modern wing" inductee into the UFC Hall of Fame, with the ceremony scheduled for International Fight Week in Las Vegas on July 9, 2026.

== Fighting style ==
Considered to be one of the best MMA fighters of his generation, Cruz combines constant lateral motion with precise, in-and-out striking. Known as one of the most agile fighters in MMA, he is noted for his quick footwork, head movement, and use of feints. He often attacks with combinations, step-in jabs, and single strikes thrown from all angles. In addition to his striking, Cruz has extensive training in amateur wrestling.

== Championships and accomplishments ==
- Ultimate Fighting Championship
  - UFC Hall of Fame (Modern Wing, Class of 2026)
  - UFC Bantamweight Championship (Two times; inaugural)
    - Three successful title defenses (two during first reign, one during second reign)
    - Tied (Aljamain Sterling, T.J. Dillashaw, Merab Dvalishvili) for most title defenses in UFC Bantamweight division history (3)
    - Tied (Aljamain Sterling & Renan Barao) for second most title fight wins in UFC Bantamweight division history (4)
    - Most title wins in UFC/WEC Bantamweight division history (7)
  - Fight of the Night (Four times) vs. Urijah Faber, T.J. Dillashaw, Cody Garbrandt and Pedro Munhoz.
  - Performance of the Night (One time) vs. Takeya Mizugaki
  - Longest single title reign in UFC Bantamweight division history by number of days (1,117)
  - Longest combined title reign in UFC Bantamweight division history by number of days (1,465)
  - Tied (Aljamain Sterling & Marlon Vera) for most wins in UFC/WEC Bantamweight division history (14)
  - Most takedowns landed in UFC/WEC Bantamweight division history (55)
  - UFC.com Awards
    - 2011: Import of the Year, Ranked #10 Fighter of the Year & Ranked #4 Fight of the Year vs. Urijah Faber 2
    - 2016: Ranked #4 Fighter of the Year
- World Extreme Cagefighting
  - WEC Bantamweight Championship (One time, final)
    - Two successful title defenses
  - Fight of the Night (One time) vs. Joseph Benavidez
- Total Combat
  - Total Combat Lightweight Championship (One time)
  - Total Combat Featherweight Championship (One time)
- The Athletic
  - 2010s Men's Bantamweight Fighter of the Decade
- USA Today
  - 2010 Fighter of the Year
- Fight Matrix
  - 2016 Comeback Fighter of the Year
- World MMA Awards
  - 2014 Comeback Fighter of the Year
  - 2015 Analyst of the Year
  - 2016 Analyst of the Year
  - 2017 Analyst of the Year
- CBS Sports
  - 2016 #9 Ranked UFC Fight of the Year vs. T.J. Dillashaw

== Mixed martial arts record ==
Professional record breakdown
28 matches	24 wins	4 losses
By knockout	7	2
By submission	1	1
By decision	16	1

Res.	Record	Opponent	Method	Event	Date	Round	Time	Location	Notes
Loss	24–4	Marlon Vera	KO (head kick)	UFC on ESPN: Vera vs. Cruz	August 13, 2022	4	2:17	San Diego, California, United States	
Win	24–3	Pedro Munhoz	Decision (unanimous)	UFC 269	December 11, 2021	3	5:00	Las Vegas, Nevada, United States	Fight of the Night.
Win	23–3	Casey Kenney	Decision (split)	UFC 259	March 6, 2021	3	5:00	Las Vegas, Nevada, United States	
Loss	22–3	Henry Cejudo	TKO (knee and punches)	UFC 249	May 9, 2020	2	4:58	Jacksonville, Florida, United States	For the UFC Bantamweight Championship.
Loss	22–2	Cody Garbrandt	Decision (unanimous)	UFC 207	December 30, 2016	5	5:00	Las Vegas, Nevada, United States	Lost the UFC Bantamweight Championship. Fight of the Night.
Win	22–1	Urijah Faber	Decision (unanimous)	UFC 199	June 4, 2016	5	5:00	Inglewood, California, United States	Defended the UFC Bantamweight Championship.
Win	21–1	T.J. Dillashaw	Decision (split)	UFC Fight Night: Dillashaw vs. Cruz	January 17, 2016	5	5:00	Boston, Massachusetts, United States	Won the UFC Bantamweight Championship. Fight of the Night.
Win	20–1	Takeya Mizugaki	KO (punches)	UFC 178	September 27, 2014	1	1:01	Las Vegas, Nevada, United States	Performance of the Night.
Win	19–1	Demetrious Johnson	Decision (unanimous)	UFC Live: Cruz vs. Johnson	October 1, 2011	5	5:00	Washington D.C., United States	Defended the UFC Bantamweight Championship. Cruz vacated the title on January 6, 2014 due to recurring injuries.
Win	18–1	Urijah Faber	Decision (unanimous)	UFC 132	July 2, 2011	5	5:00	Las Vegas, Nevada, United States	Defended the UFC Bantamweight Championship. Fight of the Night.
Win	17–1	Scott Jorgensen	Decision (unanimous)	WEC 53	December 16, 2010	5	5:00	Glendale, Arizona, United States	Defended the WEC Bantamweight Championship. Won the inaugural UFC Bantamweight Championship.
Win	16–1	Joseph Benavidez	Decision (split)	WEC 50	August 18, 2010	5	5:00	Las Vegas, Nevada, United States	Defended the WEC Bantamweight Championship.
Win	15–1	Brian Bowles	TKO (doctor stoppage)	WEC 47	March 6, 2010	2	5:00	Columbus, Ohio, United States	Won the WEC Bantamweight Championship.
Win	14–1	Joseph Benavidez	Decision (unanimous)	WEC 42	August 9, 2009	3	5:00	Las Vegas, Nevada, United States	Fight of the Night.
Win	13–1	Iván López	Technical Decision (unanimous)	WEC 40	April 5, 2009	3	3:24	Chicago, Illinois, United States	Lopez was unable to continue after an unintentional knee on the ground by Cruz.
Win	12–1	Ian McCall	Decision (unanimous)	WEC 38	January 25, 2009	3	5:00	San Diego, California, United States	
Win	11–1	Charlie Valencia	Decision (unanimous)	WEC 34	June 1, 2008	3	5:00	Sacramento, California, United States	Bantamweight debut.
Win	10–1	Kenneth Aimes	KO (punches)	Total Combat 27	March 22, 2008	1	N/A	Yuma, Arizona, United States	
Loss	9–1	Urijah Faber	Submission (guillotine choke)	WEC 26	March 24, 2007	1	1:38	Las Vegas, Nevada, United States	For the WEC Featherweight Championship.
Win	9–0	Shad Smith	Decision (unanimous)	Total Combat 18	November 4, 2006	3	5:00	San Diego, California, United States	Featherweight debut. Won the vacant Total Combat Featherweight Championship.
Win	8–0	Juan Miranda	Submission (rear-naked choke)	Total Combat 16	September 9, 2006	1	4:00	San Diego, California, United States	Won the vacant Total Combat Lightweight Championship.
Win	7–0	Dave Hisquierdo	Decision (split)	Total Combat 15	July 15, 2006	3	5:00	San Diego, California, United States	
Win	6–0	Michael Barney	TKO (punches)	Rage in the Cage 79	February 24, 2006	1	2:45	Tucson, Arizona, United States	
Win	5–0	Nick Hedrick	Decision (unanimous)	Rage in the Cage 75	September 30, 2005	3	2:00	Glendale, Arizona, United States	
Win	4–0	Josh Donahue	TKO (punches)	Rage in the Cage 74	September 10, 2005	2	1:09	Casa Grande, Arizona, United States	
Win	3–0	Tom Schwager	TKO (punches)	Rage in the Cage 73	August 6, 2005	1	0:56	Glendale, Arizona, United States	
Win	2–0	Rosco McClellan	TKO (punches)	Rage in the Cage 70	June 11, 2005	2	1:26	Glendale, Arizona, United States	
Win	1–0	Eddie Castro	Decision (split)	Rage in the Cage 67	January 29, 2005	3	3:00	Phoenix, Arizona, United States	

== Pay-per-view bouts ==
No.	Event	Fight	Date	Venue	City	PPV Buys
1.	UFC 132	Cruz vs. Faber 2	July 2, 2011	MGM Grand Garden Arena	Las Vegas, Nevada	350,000

== See also ==
- List of male mixed martial artists
- List of UFC champions
- List of UFC records
- List of UFC bonus award recipients
- List of UFC events

Awards and achievements
Preceded by Brian Bowles	5th WEC Bantamweight Champion; March 6, 2010 – December 16, 2010	Succeeded by Became UFC Champion
New title	1st UFC Bantamweight Champion; December 16, 2010 – January 6, 2014; Vacated	Succeeded by Renan Barão; Promoted
Preceded by T.J. Dillashaw	4th UFC Bantamweight Champion; January 17, 2016 – December 30, 2016	Succeeded by Cody Garbrandt
