= UFC 259 =

Mixed martial arts event in 2021

UFC 259: Błachowicz vs. Adesanya
- The poster for UFC 259: Błachowicz vs. Adesanya
- Promotion: Ultimate Fighting Championship
- Date: March 6, 2021
- Venue: UFC Apex
- City: Enterprise, Nevada, United States
- Attendance: None (behind closed doors)
- Buyrate: 800,000

Event chronology
UFC Fight Night: Rozenstruik vs. Gane	UFC 259: Błachowicz vs. Adesanya	UFC Fight Night: Edwards vs. Muhammad

UFC 259: Błachowicz vs. Adesanya was a mixed martial arts event produced by the Ultimate Fighting Championship that took place on March 6, 2021, at the UFC Apex facility in Enterprise, Nevada, part of the Las Vegas Metropolitan Area, United States.

== Background ==
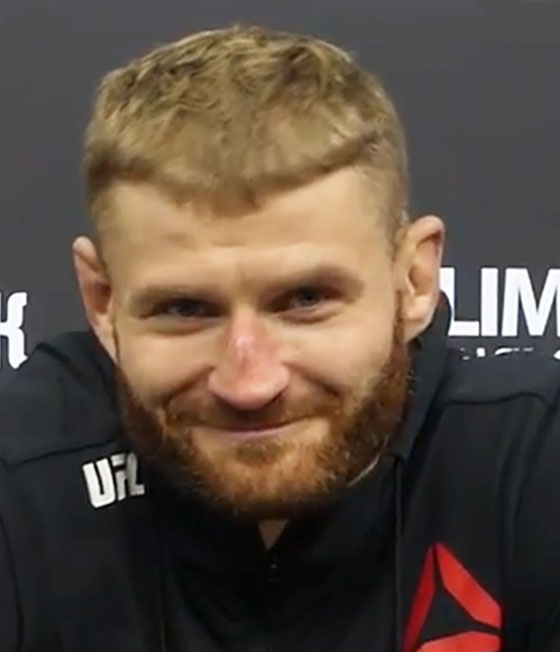
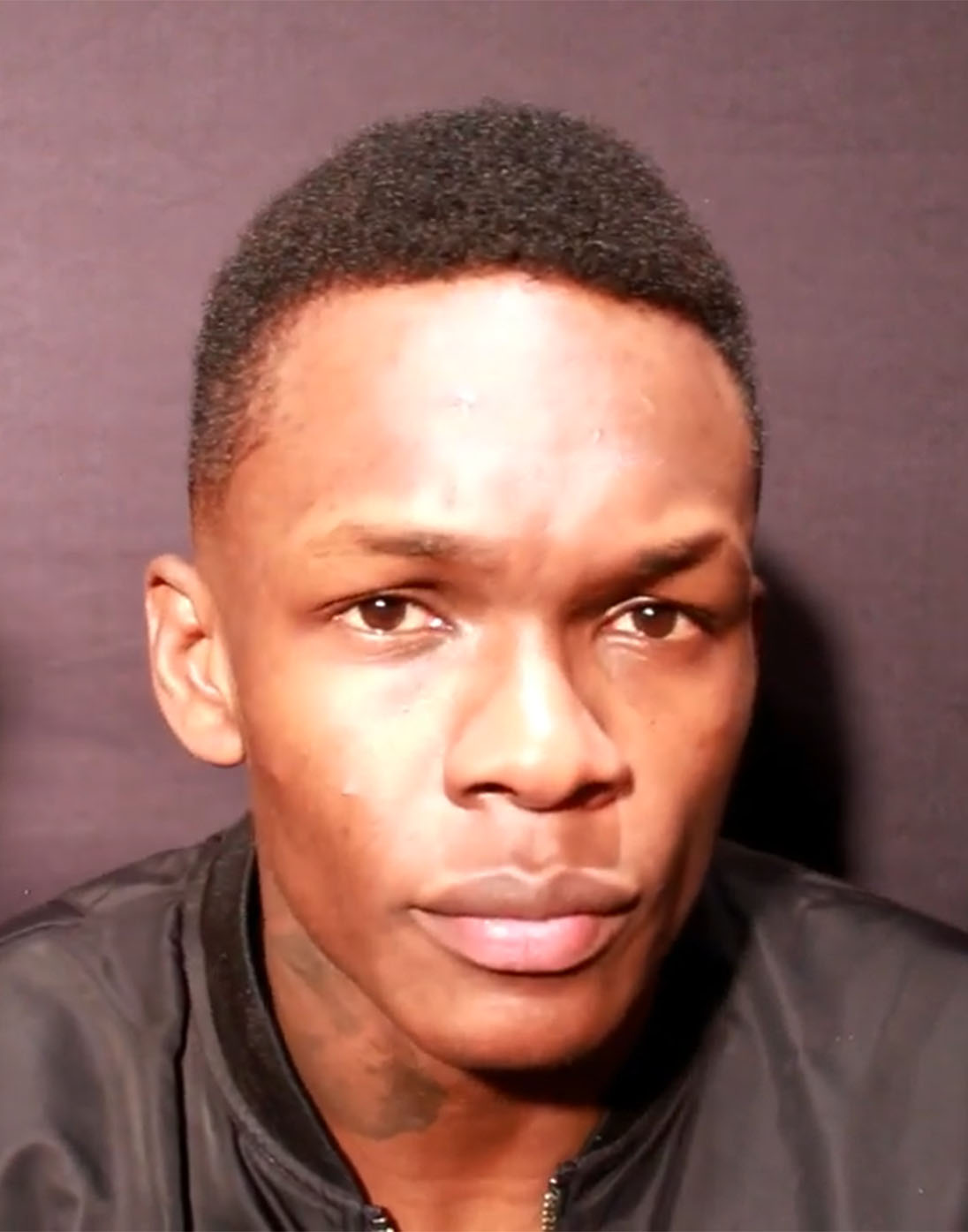
Błachowicz (left) made his first title defense. Meanwhile, then undefeated Adesanya (right) aspired to become the first fighter to hold the light heavyweight and middleweight titles simultaneously.

The event was headlined by a UFC Light Heavyweight Championship bout between then champion Jan Błachowicz (also former KSW Light Heavyweight Champion) and UFC Middleweight Champion Israel Adesanya. If successful, Adesanya would become the fourth man to be champion in two divisions simultaneously and fifth fighter overall (after Conor McGregor at UFC 205, Daniel Cormier at UFC 226, Amanda Nunes at UFC 232 and Henry Cejudo at UFC 238), as well as the eighth person overall to win a title in different divisions. This was the sixth time in UFC history that champions in different divisions fought for the same title, following UFC 94, UFC 205, UFC 226, UFC 232 and UFC Fight Night: Cejudo vs. Dillashaw. Former title challenger Glover Teixeira served as backup and a potential replacement for this fight. Adesanya did not cut weight for the fight, weighing in at 201.5 pounds, while Błachowicz weighed in at 205 pounds and expected to come in at over 220 pounds on fight night.

A UFC Women's Featherweight Championship bout between the current champion Amanda Nunes (also the current UFC Women's Bantamweight Champion) and former Invicta FC Featherweight Champion Megan Anderson served as the co-main event. The pairing was initially scheduled for UFC 256, but Nunes pulled out due to an undisclosed injury and the bout was postponed.

A UFC Bantamweight Championship bout between current champion Petr Yan and Aljamain Sterling completed the triad of title fights. They were also scheduled for UFC 256, but Yan pulled out due to visa and travel issues, leading to the postponement.

A flyweight bout between former UFC Flyweight Championship challenger Tim Elliott (also The Ultimate Fighter: Tournament of Champions flyweight winner) and Jordan Espinosa was expected to take place at UFC on ABC: Holloway vs. Kattar. However, Espinosa tested positive for COVID-19 in late December and the pairing was moved to this event.

A lightweight bout between Islam Makhachev and Drew Dober took place at this event. They were previously scheduled to meet in April 2016 at UFC on Fox: Teixeira vs. Evans, but the bout was scrapped after Makhachev failed an out-of-competition drug screening, testing positive for the banned anti-ischemic meldonium.

Randy Costa was expected to face Trevin Jones in a bantamweight bout at the event. However, on February 16, Costa withdrew due to an undisclosed injury and was replaced by Mario Bautista.

At the weigh-ins, Askar Askarov weighed in at 127 pounds, one pound over the flyweight non-title fight limit. His bout proceeded at a catchweight and he was fined a percentage of his individual purse, which went to his opponent, former flyweight title challenger Joseph Benavidez.

== Results ==
Main card
Weight class				Method	Round	Time	Notes
Light Heavyweight	Jan Błachowicz (c)	def.	Israel Adesanya	Decision (unanimous) (49–46, 49–45, 49–45)	5	5:00	(Note: For the UFC Light Heavyweight Championship.)
Women’s Featherweight	Amanda Nunes (c)	def.	Megan Anderson	Submission (triangle armbar)	1	2:03	(Note: For the UFC Women’s Featherweight Championship.)
Bantamweight	Aljamain Sterling	def.	Petr Yan (c)	DQ (illegal knee)	4	4:29	(Note: For the UFC Bantamweight Championship.)
Lightweight	Islam Makhachev	def.	Drew Dober	Submission (arm-triangle choke)	3	1:37
Light Heavyweight	Aleksandar Rakić	def.	Thiago Santos	Decision (unanimous) (29–28, 29–28, 30–27)	3	5:00
Preliminary card (ESPN / ESPN+)
Bantamweight	Dominick Cruz	def.	Casey Kenney	Decision (split) (28–29, 29–28, 30–27)	3	5:00
Bantamweight	Kyler Phillips	def.	Song Yadong	Decision (unanimous) (29–28, 29–28, 29–28)	3	5:00
Catchweight (127 lb)	Askar Askarov	def.	Joseph Benavidez	Decision (unanimous) (30–27, 30–27, 30–26)	3	5:00
Flyweight	Kai Kara-France	def.	Rogério Bontorin	KO (punches)	1	4:55
Early preliminary card (ESPN+ / UFC Fight Pass)
Flyweight	Tim Elliott	def.	Jordan Espinosa	Decision (unanimous) (30–27, 30–27, 30–25)	3	5:00
Light Heavyweight	Kennedy Nzechukwu	def.	Carlos Ulberg	KO (punches)	2	3:19
Welterweight	Sean Brady	def.	Jake Matthews	Submission (arm-triangle choke)	3	3:28
Women’s Strawweight	Amanda Lemos	def.	Lívia Renata Souza	TKO (punches)	1	3:39
Lightweight	Uroš Medić	def.	Aalon Cruz	TKO (punches)	1	1:40
Bantamweight	Trevin Jones	def.	Mario Bautista	TKO (punches)	2	0:40

== Bonus awards ==
The following fighters received $50,000 bonuses.

- Fight of the Night: Kennedy Nzechukwu vs. Carlos Ulberg
- Performance of the Night: Kai Kara-France and Uroš Medić

== See also ==
- List of UFC events
- List of current UFC fighters
- 2021 in UFC
