= UFC Fight Night: Thompson vs. Pettis =

UFC mixed martial arts event in 2019

- The poster for UFC Fight Night: Thompson vs. Pettis
- Promotion: Ultimate Fighting Championship
- Date: March 23, 2019
- Venue: Bridgestone Arena
- City: Nashville, Tennessee
- Attendance: 10,863
- Total gate: $939,095.99

Event chronology
UFC Fight Night: Till vs. Masvidal	UFC Fight Night: Thompson vs. Pettis	UFC on ESPN: Barboza vs. Gaethje

UFC Fight Night: Thompson vs. Pettis (also known as UFC Fight Night 148 or UFC on ESPN+ 6) was a mixed martial arts event produced by the Ultimate Fighting Championship that was held on March 23, 2019 at Bridgestone Arena in Nashville, Tennessee.

== Background ==
A welterweight bout between former two-time title challenger Stephen Thompson and former WEC and UFC Lightweight Champion Anthony Pettis served as the event headliner.

A bantamweight bout between Martin Day and Chris Gutiérrez was scheduled for the event. However, it was reported that Day was pulled from the bout due to injury and he was replaced by Ryan MacDonald.

Marlon Vera was expected to face Frankie Saenz in a bantamweight bout at UFC 235. However, the bout was cancelled on fight week when Vera pulled out due to illness. The bout was rescheduled and eventually took place at this event.

Nasrat Haqparast and Chris Gruetzemacher pulled out of their respective bouts, due to injury, against John Makdessi and Jesus Pinedo. In turn, Makdessi and Pinedo ended up facing each other.

At the weigh-ins, Luis Peña weighed in at 148.5 lb, 2.5 pounds over the featherweight non-title fight limit of 146 lb. He was fined 30% of his fight purse and his bout against Steven Peterson proceeded at catchweight.

== Results ==
Main Card (ESPN+)
Weight class				Method	Round	Time	Notes
Welterweight	Anthony Pettis	def.	Stephen Thompson	KO (punches)	2	4:55
Heavyweight	Curtis Blaydes	def.	Justin Willis	Decision (unanimous) (30–27, 30–26, 30–25)	3	5:00
Lightweight	John Makdessi	def.	Jesus Pinedo	Decision (unanimous) (30–27, 30–27, 29–28)	3	5:00
Flyweight	Jussier Formiga	def.	Deiveson Figueiredo	Decision (unanimous) (30–27, 29–28, 29–28)	3	5:00
Catchweight (148.5 lb)	Luis Peña	def.	Steven Peterson	Decision (unanimous) (30–27, 30–27, 30–27)	3	5:00
Women's Flyweight	Maycee Barber	def.	JJ Aldrich	TKO (knee and punches)	2	3:01
Preliminary Card (ESPN+)
Featherweight	Bryce Mitchell	def.	Bobby Moffett	Decision (unanimous) (29–28, 29–28, 29–28)	3	5:00
Bantamweight	Marlon Vera	def.	Frankie Saenz	TKO (punches)	1	1:25
Women's Flyweight	Jennifer Maia	def.	Alexis Davis	Decision (unanimous) (29–28, 29–28, 29–28)	3	5:00
Women's Strawweight	Randa Markos	def.	Angela Hill	Submission (armbar)	1	4:24
Bantamweight	Chris Gutiérrez	def.	Ryan MacDonald	Decision (unanimous) (30–27, 30–27, 30–27)	3	5:00
Flyweight	Jordan Espinosa	def.	Eric Shelton	Decision (unanimous) (29–28, 30–27, 30–27)	3	5:00

== Bonus awards ==
The following fighters were awarded $50,000 bonuses:

- Fight of the Night: Bryce Mitchell vs. Bobby Moffett
- Performance of the Night: Anthony Pettis and Randa Markos

== See also ==
- List of UFC events
- 2019 in UFC
- List of current UFC fighters
