= Raulian Paiva =

Brazilian mixed martial artist

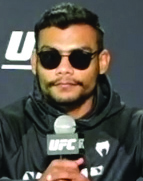
- Raulian Paiva at UFC 269
- Born: Raulian Paiva Frazão; October 17, 1995 (age 31); Santana, Amapá, Brazil
- Height: 5 ft 8 in (1.73 m)
- Weight: 56.7 kg (125 lb; 8 st 13 lb)
- Division: Flyweight (2018–2020); Bantamweight (2021–present)
- Reach: 69 1/2 in (177 cm)
- Fighting out of: Santana, Amapá, Brazil
- Team: Team Alpha Male; Ronildo Nobre Judo Club
- Rank: Black belt in Brazilian Jiu-Jitsu
- Years active: 2013–present

Mixed martial arts record
- Total: 31
- Wins: 23
- By knockout: 4
- By submission: 3
- By decision: 16
- Losses: 6
- By knockout: 2
- By submission: 1
- By decision: 3
- Draws: 2

Other information
- Mixed martial arts record from Sherdog

Raulian Paiva Frazão (born 17 October 1995) is a Brazilian mixed martial artist who competed in the Bantamweight division of the Ultimate Fighting Championship.

== Background ==
Paiva was born and raised Santana, Amapá, Brazil where he still trains. He started his MMA career at the age of 18. Paiva attended college majoring in IT, but dropped out to pursue a career in mixed martial arts.

== Mixed martial arts career ==
=== Dana White Contender Series ===
Paiva appeared on the program Dana White's Contender Series Brazil. He faced Allan Nascimento on August 11, 2018 and won the fight via split decision. With the win, Paiva was offered a UFC contract.

=== Ultimate Fighting Championship ===
Paiva made his UFC debut on February 10, 2019 at UFC 234 where he faced New Zealand fighter Kai Kara-France. He lost the fight on a split decision.

His next fight was on August 10, 2019 at UFC Fight Night: Shevchenko vs. Carmouche 2 against Rogério Bontorin. He lost the fight via technical knockout after receiving a deep gash on his eyebrow.

Paiva faced Mark De La Rosa on February 15, 2020 at UFC Fight Night 167. He won the fight via knockout in the second round.

Paiva faced Zhalgas Zhumagulov on July 11, 2020 at UFC 251. At the weigh ins, Paiva weighed in at 129 pounds, 3 pounds over the flyweight non-title limit. He was fined 20% of his purse. The bout proceeded at catchweight. He won the fight via unanimous decision.

Paiva was expected to face Amir Albazi on October 31, 2020 at UFC Fight Night: Hall vs. Silva. However, Paiva pulled out of the fight on 11 September citing a knee injury.

Paiva was scheduled to face David Dvořák on May 22, 2021 at UFC Fight Night: Font vs. Garbrandt. However, Paiva pulled out of the fight on the day before the event due to ill effects related to his weight cut. As a result, the bout was scrapped.

Paiva faced Kyler Phillips on July 24, 2021 at UFC on ESPN: Sandhagen vs. Dillashaw. Paiva won the fight via majority decision despite 14 of 16 media members scoring the bout a draw. This fight earned him the Fight of the Night award.

Paiva faced Sean O'Malley on December 11, 2021 at UFC 269. He lost the fight via first round TKO.

Paiva faced Sergey Morozov on June 25, 2022, at UFC on ESPN 38. He lost the fight via unanimous decision.

It was announced in mid January that Paiva was released by the UFC.

=== Post UFC ===
Paiva was scheduled to face fellow UFC vet Timur Valiev on October 20, 2023 at UAE Warriors 45, however Paiva missed weight and the bout was scrapped.

== Personal life ==
On 21 October 2018 Paiva and his girlfriend Tieli Alves were leaving a party in their hometown on motorcycle when they were intentionally struck by a car driven by individuals they had gotten into an argument with at the event. Paiva did not suffer any serious injuries but his girlfriend Alves suffered serious head trauma and remained in a coma for six days before dying. The alleged occupants of the car, Elber Nunes Zacheu and Johny de Souza Amoras, were later arrested by police, Zacheu was handed the sentence for 16 years both for the death of Tieli Alves, and for attempting to kill Paiva and the driver, de Souza Amoras, had been a fugitive, but was arrested a day prior to Zacheu’s trial commencing where his trial is expected to commence in 2023. In remembrance of his late girlfriend Paiva has had her name written on his mouthguard during his UFC fights.

== Championships and achievements ==
=== Mixed martial arts ===
- Ultimate Fighting Championship
  - Fight of the Night (One time) vs. Kyler Phillips
- North Extreme Championship
  - NEC Bantamweight Championship (one time; former)

== Mixed martial arts record ==
Professional record breakdown
31 matches	23 wins	6 losses
By knockout	4	2
By submission	3	1
By decision	16	3
Draws	2	

Res.	Record	Opponent	Method	Event	Date	Round	Time	Location	Notes
Draw	23–6–2	Makhmud Akimov	Draw (majority)	North-West Power Alliance: World Peace	May 7, 2025	3	5:00	Saint Petersburg, Russia	Return to Featherweight.
Loss	23–6–1	Ruslan Sariev	Decision (unanimous)	Alash Pride 101	November 1, 2024	5	5:00	Almaty, Kazakhstan	For the vacant Alash Pride Bantamweight Championship.
Win	23–5–1	Silas Lima	Decision (unanimous)	ExpoCombat 2024	September 8, 2024	5	5:00	Macapá, Brazil	Won the vacant EC Bantamweight Championship.
Win	22–5–1	Marcos Anatoly Silva Fragoso	Decision (unanimous)	Guerrero Fight Championship 2	April 13, 2024	3	5:00	Santana, Brazil	
Draw	21–5–1	Danilo da Silva Morais	Draw	Guerrero Fight Championship 1	December 22, 2023	3	5:00	Santana, Brazil	
Loss	21–5	Sergey Morozov	Decision (unanimous)	UFC on ESPN: Tsarukyan vs. Gamrot	June 25, 2022	3	5:00	Las Vegas, Nevada, United States	
Loss	21–4	Sean O'Malley	TKO (punches)	UFC 269	December 11, 2021	1	4:42	Las Vegas, Nevada, United States	
Win	21–3	Kyler Phillips	Decision (majority)	UFC on ESPN: Sandhagen vs. Dillashaw	July 24, 2021	3	5:00	Las Vegas, Nevada, United States	Return to Bantamweight. Fight of the Night.
Win	20–3	Zhalgas Zhumagulov	Decision (unanimous)	UFC 251	July 12, 2020	3	5:00	Abu Dhabi, United Arab Emirates	Catchweight (129 lb) bout; Paiva missed weight.
Win	19–3	Mark De La Rosa	KO (punches)	UFC Fight Night: Anderson vs. Błachowicz 2	February 15, 2020	2	4:42	Rio Rancho, New Mexico, United States	
Loss	18–3	Rogério Bontorin	TKO (doctor stoppage)	UFC Fight Night: Shevchenko vs. Carmouche 2	August 10, 2019	1	2:56	Montevideo, Uruguay	
Loss	18–2	Kai Kara-France	Decision (split)	UFC 234	February 10, 2019	3	5:00	Melbourne, Australia	
Win	18–1	Allan Nascimento	Decision (split)	Dana White's Contender Series Brazil 3	August 11, 2018	3	5:00	Las Vegas, Nevada, United States	Flyweight debut.
Win	17–1	Iliarde Santos	KO (punches)	Salvaterra Marajo Fight 7	November 30, 2017	1	0:58	Salvaterra, Brazil	Bantamweight bout.
Win	16–1	Lisrael Pereira Figueiredo	Submission (arm-triangle choke)	Pezão Combate: Raulian vs. Miojo	September 30, 2017	1	4:29	Macapá, Brazil	
Win	15–1	Renan Carlos dos Santos Silva	Submission (anaconda choke)	Eco Fight Championship 18	May 6, 2017	2	2:08	Macapá, Brazil	
Win	14–1	Jefte Costa Brilhante	Decision (unanimous)	W-Combat 21	April 15, 2017	3	5:00	Santana, Brazil	
Win	13–1	Adriano da Silva Santana	Decision (split)	North Extreme Cagefighting 31	December 10, 2016	3	5:00	Macapá, Brazil	Catchweight (142 lb) bout.
Win	12–1	Chrysangelo Moraes	Decision (unanimous)	North Extreme Cagefighting 27	July 9, 2016	3	5:00	Macapá, Brazil	Won the NEC Bantamweight Championship.
Win	11–1	José Silva da Silva Jr.	TKO (punches)	North Extreme Cagefighting 25	June 4, 2016	3	0:49	Oiapoque, Brazil	Bantamweight bout.
Win	10–1	Rogério Ferreira Furtado	Decision (unanimous)	North Extreme Cagefighting 23	February 13, 2016	3	5:00	Santana, Brazil	Bantamweight bout.
Win	9–1	Klebson Freitas Araújo	TKO (punches)	Iron Man Vale Tudo 29	December 19, 2015	1	1:12	Macapá, Brazil	
Win	8–1	Juvêncio Barbosa Coelho	Decision (unanimous)	Expo Fight 16	November 4, 2015	3	5:00	Macapá, Brazil	
Win	7–1	Jonas dos Santos	Decision (unanimous)	Expo Fight 16	November 4, 2015	3	5:00	Macapá, Brazil	
Loss	6–1	Luan Lacerda	Submission (anaconda choke)	Eco Fight Championship 15	October 3, 2015	3	3:50	Macapá, Brazil	
Win	6–0	Lucas Bessa	Decision (unanimous)	North Extreme Cagefighting 17	May 9, 2015	3	5:00	Santana, Brazil	Bantamweight bout.
Win	5–0	Junior de Souza Valente	Submission (kimura)	Gladiadores MMA 4: Simão vs. Roberto	December 20, 2014	2	1:46	Macapá, Brazil	
Win	4–0	Aluizio Bruno Silva dos Santos	Decision (unanimous)	W-Combat 20	September 13, 2014	3	5:00	Macapá, Brazil	
Win	3–0	Edflávio da Silva Freitas	Decision (unanimous)	North Extreme Cagefighting 14	June 14, 2014	3	5:00	Macapá, Brazil	
Win	2–0	Werllen Furtado dos Santos	Decision (unanimous)	W-Combat 19	December 21, 2013	3	5:00	Macapá, Brazil	
Win	1–0	Moisés Santos	Decision (unanimous)	ExpoFight Amapá	October 1, 2013	3	5:00	Macapá, Brazil	

== See also ==
- List of male mixed martial artists
