= The MMA Lab =

Mixed martial arts gym based in Arizona

- Est.: November 16, 2006; 19 years ago
- Founded by: Jason Beck
- Primary owners: John Crouch; Benson Henderson; Joe Ervin
- Past titleholders: Benson Henderson; Sean O'Malley
- Training facilities: Glendale, Arizona, U.S.
- Website: www.mmalab.com

The MMA Lab (also known as MMA Lab and The Lab) is a mixed martial arts (MMA) gym based in Glendale, Arizona. It has produced two UFC champions in Benson Henderson (former UFC Lightweight Champion) and Sean O'Malley (former UFC Bantamweight Champion).

== History ==
According to Bloody Elbow, MMA Lab was incorporated on November 16, 2006, with its two largest shareholders being Khonkhor Enterprises and JBeck Investments. Both were investment companies owned by Royce Gracie and Jason Beck respectively. Beck previously trained at a Gracie Academy and had expressed interest in opening his own gym in central Arizona. He later brought in his training partner and Gracie Academy instructor, John Crouch to join MMA Lab.

In early 2012, Gracie and Beck transferred their ownership interest of MMA Lab to Crouch, Benson Henderson and Joe Ervin.

In early 2015, Gracie was involved in a tax dispute with the Internal Revenue Service where it claimed Gracie and his wife fraudulently evaded paying over $1.1 million in personal income taxes from 2007 to 2012 via various means. It disallowed a 2011 Khonkhor expense deduction for $338,871 which was for MMA Lab having a net loss.

In 2018, the MMA Lab facility was upgraded to have three training rooms, a full-sized octagon and a weight room for strength and conditioning.

MMA Lab has currently produced three UFC champions: Mackenzie Dern (current UFC strawweight champion), Benson Henderson (former UFC lightweight champion) and Sean O'Malley (former UFC bantamweight champion).

== Notable fighters ==
- Benson Henderson
- Sean O'Malley
- Jared Cannonier
- The Korean Zombie
- Mackenzie Dern (formerly)
- Joe Riggs
- Mario Bautista
- Kyler Phillips
- Jamie Varner
- Efraín Escudero
- John Moraga
- Johnny Case
- Steven Siler
- Alex Caceres
- Bryan Barberena
- Rick Story

== See also ==
- List of professional MMA training camps
