= Kyler Phillips =

American mixed martial artist (born 1995)

- Born: Kyler John Phillips; June 12, 1995 (age 31); Torrance, California, U.S.
- Other names: The Matrix
- Height: 5 ft 8 in (1.73 m)
- Weight: 135 lb (61 kg; 9 st 9 lb)
- Division: Bantamweight
- Reach: 72 in (183 cm)
- Fighting out of: Glendale, Arizona, U.S.
- Team: MMA Lab
- Years active: 2016–present

Mixed martial arts record
- Total: 17
- Wins: 12
- By knockout: 5
- By submission: 2
- By decision: 5
- Losses: 5
- By decision: 5

Other information
- Mixed martial arts record from Sherdog

Kyler John Phillips (born June 12, 1995) is an American professional mixed martial artist. He currently competes in the Bantamweight division of the Ultimate Fighting Championship (UFC).

== Background ==
At the age of three, Phillip's father took him to the Gracie Academy out of Torrance, California, where he developed a lifelong love for it. At the age of 12, Phillips took part in pankration fights and had his first MMA fight at the age of 16. Phillips also wrestled at Temecula Valley High School. He is a Carlson Gracie BJJ Brown belt, and a Nikidokai black/red belt under grandmaster Hanshi Nico. Among some other accomplishments of Phillips are IBJJF jiu-jitsu world champion blue belt (2012), California State judo champion (2010), and California Southern Section CIF wrestling champion at 138 lbs (2013).

== Mixed martial arts career ==
=== Early career ===
After a 4–0 record on the regional scene, including an impressive win at LFA 13 against Jonathan Quiroz, was invited to first season of Dana White's Contender Series 4 in 2017, when he only needed 46 seconds to stop James Gray Jr. While not being offered a contract to the UFC, he was brought in to compete on The Ultimate Fighter: Undefeated.

On the show he lost a majority decision to eventual season winner Brad Katona. Then came his first official pro defeat, a split decision to Victor Henry in a 2018 bout before a head kick knockout of Emeka Ifekandu in 2019 earned him his call to the Octagon.

=== Ultimate Fighting Championship ===
Phillips made his UFC debut against Gabriel Silva on February 29, 2020, at UFC Fight Night 169. He won the bout in dominant fashion via unanimous decision. This win earned him the Fight of the Night bonus.

Phillips faced Cameron Else on October 4, 2020, at UFC on ESPN 16. He won the bout via stoppage due to elbows on the ground in the second round. This win earned him the Performance of the Night bonus.

Phillips faced Song Yadong on March 6, 2021, at UFC 259. He won the bout via unanimous decision.

Phillips was scheduled to face Raphael Assunção on July 24, 2021, at UFC on ESPN 27. However, Assunção suffered a bicep injury in late June and was replaced by Raulian Paiva. Phillips lost the fight via majority decision. This fight earned him the Fight of the Night award.

Phillips faced Marcelo Rojo on February 12, 2022, at UFC 271. He won the fight via triangle armbar submission in round three.

Phillips was scheduled to face Jack Shore on November 19, 2022, at UFC Fight Night 215. However, Shore pulled out of the fight due to a knee injury.

Phillips was scheduled to face Raphael Assunção on March 11, 2023, at UFC Fight Night 221. However, Phillips withdrew from the event for undisclosed reasons, and he was replaced by Davey Grant.

In March, it was announced that Phillips was suspended by NSAC due to testing positive for ostarine for six months effective January 22, 2023. He would be eligible to fight again on July 22, 2023.

Phillips was scheduled to face Said Nurmagomedov on August 5, 2023, at UFC on ESPN 50. However, Nurmagomedov withdrew for unknown reasons and was replaced by Raoni Barcelos. He won the bout via unanimous decision.

Phillips faced Pedro Munhoz on March 9, 2024, at UFC 299. He won the bout by unanimous decision.

Phillips faced Rob Font on October 19, 2024, at UFC Fight Night 245. He lost the fight by unanimous decision.

Phillips faced Vinicius Oliveira on July 19, 2025, at UFC 318. He lost the fight by unanimous decision.

Phillips faced Charles Jourdain on April 18, 2026, at UFC Fight Night 273. He lost the fight by unanimous decision. This fight earned him a $100,000 Fight of the Night award.

Phillips is scheduled to face Ethyn Ewing on December 12, 2026 at UFC 335.

== Championships and achievements ==
=== Mixed martial arts ===
- Ultimate Fighting Championship
  - Fight of the Night (Three times) vs. Gabriel Silva, Raulian Paiva and Charles Jourdain
  - Performance of the Night (One time) vs. Cameron Else

== Mixed martial arts record ==
Professional record breakdown
17 matches	12 wins	5 losses
By knockout	5	0
By submission	2	0
By decision	5	5

Res.	Record	Opponent	Method	Event	Date	Round	Time	Location	Notes
Loss	12–5	Charles Jourdain	Decision (unanimous)	UFC Fight Night: Burns vs. Malott	April 18, 2026	3	5:00	Winnipeg, Manitoba, Canada	Fight of the Night.
Loss	12–4	Vinicius Oliveira	Decision (unanimous)	UFC 318	July 19, 2025	3	5:00	New Orleans, Louisiana, United States	
Loss	12–3	Rob Font	Decision (unanimous)	UFC Fight Night: Hernandez vs. Pereira	October 19, 2024	3	5:00	Las Vegas, Nevada, United States	
Win	12–2	Pedro Munhoz	Decision (unanimous)	UFC 299	March 9, 2024	3	5:00	Miami, Florida, United States	
Win	11–2	Raoni Barcelos	Decision (unanimous)	UFC on ESPN: Sandhagen vs. Font	August 5, 2023	3	5:00	Nashville, Tennessee, United States	
Win	10–2	Marcelo Rojo	Submission (triangle armbar)	UFC 271	February 12, 2022	3	1:48	Houston, Texas, United States	
Loss	9–2	Raulian Paiva	Decision (majority)	UFC on ESPN: Sandhagen vs. Dillashaw	July 24, 2021	3	5:00	Las Vegas, Nevada, United States	Fight of the Night.
Win	9–1	Song Yadong	Decision (unanimous)	UFC 259	March 6, 2021	3	5:00	Las Vegas, Nevada, United States	
Win	8–1	Cameron Else	TKO (elbows)	UFC on ESPN: Holm vs. Aldana	October 4, 2020	2	0:44	Abu Dhabi, United Arab Emirates	Performance of the Night.
Win	7–1	Gabriel Silva	Decision (unanimous)	UFC Fight Night: Benavidez vs. Figueiredo	February 29, 2020	3	5:00	Norfolk, Virginia, United States	Fight of the Night.
Win	6–1	Emeka Ifekandu	KO (head kick)	LFA 59	February 1, 2019	1	2:30	Phoenix, Arizona, United States	
Loss	5–1	Victor Henry	Decision (split)	California Xtreme Fighting 15	October 20, 2018	3	5:00	Burbank, California, United States	
Win	5–0	James Gray	TKO (elbows and punches)	Dana White's Contender Series 4	August 1, 2017	1	0:46	Las Vegas, Nevada, United States	
Win	4–0	Jonathan Quiroz	Decision (unanimous)	LFA 13	June 2, 2017	3	5:00	Burbank, California, United States	
Win	3–0	George Garcia	TKO (punches)	California Xtreme Fighting 5	December 17, 2016	1	2:55	Studio City, California, United States	
Win	2–0	PJ Ste-Marie	Submission (calf slicer)	California Xtreme Fighting 4	September 10, 2016	1	4:37	Studio City, California, United States	
Win	1–0	Taylor Alfaro	TKO (punches)	California Xtreme Fighting 1	March 4, 2016	1	2:30	Studio City, California, United States	Bantamweight debut.

== Mixed martial arts exhibition record ==
Exhibition record breakdown		
1 match	0 wins	1 loss
By decision	0	1

Res.	Record	Opponent	Method	Event	Date	Round	Time	Location	Notes
Loss	0–1	Brad Katona	Decision (majority)	The Ultimate Fighter: Undefeated	Apr 25, 2018 (airdate)	2	5:00	Las Vegas, Nevada, United States	TUF 27 Quarterfinal round.

== See also ==
- List of current UFC fighters
- List of Dana White's Contender Series alumni
- List of male mixed martial artists
