= UFC on ESPN: Eye vs. Calvillo =

UFC mixed martial arts event in 2020

- The poster for UFC on ESPN: Eye vs. Calvillo
- Promotion: Ultimate Fighting Championship
- Date: June 13, 2020
- Venue: UFC Apex
- City: Enterprise, Nevada, United States
- Attendance: None (behind closed doors)

Event chronology
UFC 250: Nunes vs. Spencer	UFC on ESPN: Eye vs. Calvillo	UFC on ESPN: Blaydes vs. Volkov

UFC on ESPN: Eye vs. Calvillo (also known as UFC on ESPN 10 and UFC Vegas 2) was a mixed martial arts event produced by the Ultimate Fighting Championship that took place on June 13, 2020, at the UFC Apex facility in Enterprise, Nevada, part of the Las Vegas Metropolitan Area, United States.

== Background ==
This event was initially planned to take place at Astana Arena in Nur-Sultan, Kazakhstan and would have been the first that the promotion had contested there. However, it was announced by UFC president Dana White on April 9 that starting with UFC 249, all future events were indefinitely postponed due to the COVID-19 pandemic.

While not officially announced by the organization, the promotion was targeting a bantamweight bout between former WSOF Bantamweight Champion and UFC Bantamweight Championship challenger Marlon Moraes and Petr Yan to serve as the original event headliner. The pairing was scrapped after it was confirmed that the event would no longer take place in Kazakhstan.

Subsequently, a women's flyweight bout between former UFC Women's Flyweight Championship challenger Jessica Eye and Cynthia Calvillo served as the new event headliner for Las Vegas. The event streamed on ESPN+ and aired on ESPN.

Due to the event being relocated to the United States, some changes were made as several fighters were unable to compete due to travel restrictions related to the COVID-19 pandemic:

- A light heavyweight bout between Roman Dolidze and Khadis Ibragimov was postponed and rescheduled for July 18 at UFC Fight Night: Figueiredo vs. Benavidez 2.
- A flyweight bout between promotional newcomer Zhalgas Zhumagulov and Jordan Espinosa was initially scheduled for the event when it was targeted for Kazakhstan. However, due to travel restrictions related to COVID-19 pandemic, Zhumagulov was removed from the card after the event was moved to Las Vegas. Espinosa instead would face Mark De La Rosa in a bantamweight bout.

Additionally, the event included fighters that were pulled from other events previously cancelled, as well as the following bouts:

- A middleweight bout between Karl Roberson and Marvin Vettori (originally scheduled for UFC Fight Night: Smith vs. Teixeira, but Roberson pulled out due to issues related to his failed weight cut).
- A women's bantamweight bout between Julia Avila and Karol Rosa. The pairing was expected to meet at UFC Fight Night: Maia vs. Askren in October 2019, but Rosa pulled out due to a knee injury. They were later rescheduled for UFC Fight Night: Overeem vs. Harris and UFC Fight Night: Hermansson vs. Weidman, but both times the bout was postponed due to the COVID-19 pandemic. They were later booked for this event, but the bout was canceled for the fourth time as Rosa had visa issues. She was replaced by Gina Mazany.
- A women's flyweight bout between former KSW Women's Flyweight Champion Ariane Lipski and Luana Carolina (originally scheduled for UFC on ESPN: Overeem vs. Harris). Subsequently, the pairing was delayed a second time and was rescheduled for July 18 at UFC Fight Night: Figueiredo vs. Benavidez 2 due to travel restrictions for both fighters.

A women's flyweight bout between Melissa Gatto and Mariya Agapova was scheduled for the event, but Gatto pulled out on June 7 due to visa issues. She was replaced by Hannah Cifers.

A flyweight bout between Tyson Nam and Ryan Benoit was scheduled for the event. However, Benoit withdrew due to undisclosed reasons and was replaced by promotional newcomer Zarrukh Adashev, thus changing the contest to the bantamweight division.

A bantamweight bout between former UFC Flyweight Championship challenger Ray Borg and Merab Dvalishvili was scheduled for the event. However, Borg withdrew from the event for personal reasons and was replaced by promotional newcomer Gustavo Lopez. The bout took place at a catchweight of 140 pounds.

Before the weigh-ins, Darrick Minner was pulled from his bout with Jordan Griffin due to unspecified health issues and the bout was cancelled.

At the weigh-ins, Eye, Roberson and Adashev all missed weight for their respective bouts. Eye weighed in at 126.25 pounds, a quarter pound over the flyweight non-title fight limit. Roberson weighed in at 190.5 pounds, four and a half pounds over the middleweight non-title fight limit and Adashev weighed in at 138.5 pounds, two and a half pounds over the bantamweight non-title fight limit. Their bouts proceeded at a catchweight and they were respectively fined 25%, 30% and 20% of their individual purses, which went to their opponents Calvillo, Vettori and Nam.

== Results ==
Main card (ESPN / ESPN+)
Weight class				Method	Round	Time	Notes
Catchweight (126.25 lb)	Cynthia Calvillo	def.	Jessica Eye	Decision (unanimous) (49–46, 49–46, 48–47)	5	5:00
Catchweight (190.5 lb)	Marvin Vettori	def.	Karl Roberson	Submission (rear-naked choke)	1	4:17
Lightweight	Charles Rosa	def.	Kevin Aguilar	Decision (split) (28–29, 29–28, 29–28)	3	5:00
Featherweight	Andre Fili	def.	Charles Jourdain	Decision (split) (28–29, 29–28, 29–28)	3	5:00
Bantamweight	Jordan Espinosa	def.	Mark De La Rosa	Decision (unanimous) (30–27, 30–27, 30–26)	3	5:00
Women's Flyweight	Mariya Agapova	def.	Hannah Cifers	Submission (rear-naked choke)	1	2:42
Preliminary card (ESPN / ESPN+)
Catchweight (140 lb)	Merab Dvalishvili	def.	Gustavo Lopez	Decision (unanimous) (30–26, 30–26, 30–25)	3	5:00
Women's Bantamweight	Julia Avila	def.	Gina Mazany	TKO (punches)	1	0:22
Catchweight (138.5 lb)	Tyson Nam	def.	Zarrukh Adashev	KO (punch)	1	0:32
Welterweight	Christian Aguilera	def.	Anthony Ivy	TKO (punches)	1	0:59

== Bonus awards ==
The following fighters received $50,000 bonuses.

- Fight of the Night: No bonus awarded.
- Performance of the Night: Marvin Vettori, Mariya Agapova, Tyson Nam and Christian Aguilera

== Reported payout ==
The following is the reported payout to the fighters as reported to the Nevada State Athletic Commission (NSAC). It does not include sponsor money and also does not include the UFC's traditional "fight night" bonuses. The total disclosed payout for the event was $782,000.

- Cynthia Calvillo: $122,750 (includes $55,000 win bonus) def. Jessica Eye: $38,250 ^
- Marvin Vettori: $98,000 (includes $43,000 win bonus) def. Karl Roberson: $28,000 ^
- Charles Rosa: $68,000 (includes $34,000 win bonus) def. Kevin Aguilar: $25,000
- Andre Fili: $110,000 (includes $55,000 win bonus) def. Charles Jourdain: $16,000
- Jordan Espinosa: $24,000 (includes $12,000 win bonus) def. Mark De La Rosa: $21,000
- Mariya Agapova: $20,000 (includes $10,000 win bonus) def. Hannah Cifers: $35,000
- Merab Dvalishvili: $46,000 (includes $23,000 win bonus) def. Gustavo Lopez: $12,000
- Julia Avila: $24,000 (includes $12,000 win bonus) def. Gina Mazany: $16,000
- Tyson Nam: $30,800 (includes $14,000 win bonus) def. Zarrukh Adashev: $11,200 ^
- Christian Aguilera: $24,000 (includes $12,000 win bonus) def. Anthony Ivy: $12,000

^ Eye ($12,750), Roberson ($12,000) and Adashev ($2,800) were respectively fined 25%, 30% and 20% of their purses for failing to make the required weight limit for each of their respective fights. That money was issued to their opponents, a NSAC official confirmed.

== See also ==
- List of UFC events
- List of current UFC fighters
- 2020 in UFC
