= 2024 in LUX Fight League =

Information
- First date: February 2, 2024
- Last date: November 29, 2024

Events
- Total events: 10

Fights
- Total fights: 104
- Title fights: 12

The year 2024 was the 8th year in the history of LUX Fight League, a mixed martial arts promotion based in Mexico. In these year, LUX held 10 events.

== Events list ==
| # | Event | Date held | Venue | City |
|---|---|---|---|---|
| 1 | LUX 039 | February 2, 2024 | Teatro Explanada | Puebla, Mexico |
| 2 | LUX 040 | February 23, 2024 | Centro Citibanamex | Mexico City, Mexico |
| 3 | LUX 041 | March 15, 2024 | Showcenter Complex | Monterrey, Mexico |
| 4 | LUX 042 | April 26, 2024 | CODE Alcalde Dome | Guadalajara, Mexico |
| 5 | LUX 043 | June 28, 2024 | Gimnasio Marcelino González | Zacatecas, Mexico |
| 6 | LUX 044 | August 2, 2024 | Frontón México | Mexico City, Mexico |
| 7 | LUX 045 | August 26, 2024 | Showcenter Complex | Monterrey, Mexico |
| 8 | LUX 046 | October 11, 2024 | Expo Tampico | Tampico, Mexico |
| 9 | LUX 047 | November 1, 2024 | Frontón México | Mexico City, Mexico |
| 10 | LUX 048 | November 29, 2024 | Showcenter Complex | Monterrey, Mexico |

== LUX 039 ==
LUX 039
- Promotion: LUX Fight League
- Date: February 2, 2024
- Venue: Teatro Explanada
- City: Puebla, Mexico

Event chronology
| LUX 038 | LUX 039 | LUX 040 |

LUX 039 was a mixed martial arts event held by LUX Fight League on February 2, 2024, at the Teatro Explanada in Puebla, Mexico.

=== Background ===
A fight for the LUX Featherweight Championship between champion Edgar Delgado and Francesco Patron headlined the event.

=== Results ===
Main card
| Weight class | | | | Method | Round | Time | Notes |
|---|---|---|---|---|---|---|---|
| Flyweight | Édgar Delgado Jiménez (c) | def. | Francesco Patrón | TKO (knee injury) | 3 | 4:03 | (Note: For the LUX Featherweight Championship) |
| Catchweight | Pablo Sabori | def. | Dumar Roa | TKO (punches) | 2 | 3:32 |
| Flyweight | Axel Osuna | def. | Samuel Cortés | Decision (unanimous) | 3 | 5:00 |
| Lightweight | Alejandro Cerquera | def. | Luis Meraz | TKO (punches) | 2 | 3:31 |
| Bantamweight | Damián Fernández | def. | Alberto García | Decision (unanimous) | 3 | 5:00 |
| Flyweight | Paulino Siller | def. | Hugo Torres | Decision (unanimous) | 3 | 5:00 |
| Flyweight | Alexis León | def. | Jander Martínez | Submission (rear-naked choke) | 3 | 4:17 |
| Women's Strawweight | Dana García | def. | Daniela Meléndez | Decision (unanimous) | 3 | 5:00 |
| Bantamweight | Juan Zúñiga | def. | Antonio Hernández | TKO (punches) | 1 | 0:31 |
| Women's Strawweight | Andrea Martínez | def. | Monica Alarcón | Submission (armbar) | 2 | 0:57 |

== LUX 040 ==
LUX 040
- Promotion: LUX Fight League
- Date: February 23, 2024
- Venue: Centro Citibanamex
- City: Mexico City, Mexico

Event chronology
| LUX 039 | LUX 040 | LUX 041 |

LUX 040 was a mixed martial arts event held by LUX Fight League on February 23, 2024, at the Centro Citibanamex in Mexico City, Mexico.

=== Background ===
A welterweight bout between Raúl Zaragoza and Anuar Aburto headlined the event.

=== Results ===
Main card
| Weight class | | | | Method | Round | Time | Notes |
|---|---|---|---|---|---|---|---|
| Welterweight | Raúl Zaragoza | def. | Anuar Aburto | Decision (unanimous) | 5 | 5:00 |
| Catchweight | Mauricio Partida | def. | David Pérez | Submission (rear-naked choke) | 2 | 2:03 |
| Flyweight | Luis Iván Rodríguez | def. | Yahir Ramírez | TKO (punches) | 1 | 1:38 |
| Flyweight | Cesar Vázquez Jr. | def. | Luis Quintana | Submission (reck crank) | 2 | 1:24 |
| Welterweight | Antonio Suárez | def. | Josue Bojorge | Submission (rear-naked choke) | 1 | 4:45 |
| Catchweight | Yazmin Nájera | def. | Linda Martell | Decision (unanimous) | 3 | 5:00 |
| Featherweight | Jefferson Vargas | def. | Alejandro Gavidia | TKO (punches) | 2 | 2:14 |
| Catchweight | Damara Vargas | def. | Alejandra Orozco | Submission (rear-naked choke) | 1 | 2:21 |
| Welterweight | Martin González | def. | Fernando Márquez | TKO (punches) | 2 | 2:40 |
| Bantamweight | Abraham Nava | def. | Jefferson Chaves | Decision (unanimous) | 3 | 5:00 |
| Flyweight | Alex Muñíz | def. | Davis Knutsen | TKO (punches) | 3 | 2:26 |

== LUX 041 ==
LUX 041
- Promotion: LUX Fight League
- Date: March 15, 2024
- Venue: Showcenter Complex
- City: Monterrey, Mexico

Event chronology
| LUX 040 | LUX 041 | LUX 042 |

LUX 041 was a mixed martial arts event held by LUX Fight League on March 15, 2024, at the Showcenter Complex in Monterrey, Mexico.

=== Background ===
A fight for the LUX Flyweight Championship between champion Jorge Calvo Martin and former title challenger Kike González headlined the event.

The co-main event featured a bantamweight bout between Emilio Saavedra and Emmanuel Rivero.

=== Results ===
Main card
| Weight class | | | | Method | Round | Time | Notes |
|---|---|---|---|---|---|---|---|
| Flyweight | Jorge Calvo Martin (c) | def. | Kike González | Decision (unanimous) | 5 | 5:00 | (Note: For the LUX Flyweight Championship) |
| Bantamweight | Emilio Saavedra | def. | Emmanuel Rivero | Decision (split) | 3 | 5:00 |
| Bantamweight | Luis Rey Gallegos | def. | Eduardo Alvarado | Decision (unanimous) | 3 | 5:00 |
| Flyweight | Ivonne Caro | def. | Victoria Alba | Decision (unanimous) | 3 | 5:00 |
| Flyweight | Uriel Uribe | def. | Carlos Gómez | TKO (soccer kick) | 3 | 4:52 |
| Catchweight | Karla Pastrana | def. | Yajáira Romo | Decision (unanimous) | 3 | 5:00 |
| Catchweight | Alan Alexis Castro | def. | Alejandro Villarreal | KO (punch) | 1 | 0:21 |
| Bantamweight | Fabian López | def. | Liborio López | Submission (rear-naked choke) | 1 | 2:58 |
| Lightweight | Pedro Rubio | def. | Adrián Cortés | Submission (rear-naked choke) | 1 | 3:46 |
| Lightweight | Bryan Ulises | def. | David Hernández | Decision (unanimous) | 3 | 5:00 |
| Bantamweight | Franco Varessy | def. | Alejandro Hernández | TKO (punches) | 2 | 4:31 |

== LUX 042 ==
LUX 042
- Promotion: LUX Fight League
- Date: April 26, 2024
- Venue: CODE Alcalde Dome
- City: Guadalajara, Mexico

Event chronology
| LUX 041 | LUX 042 | LUX 043 |

LUX 042 was a mixed martial arts event held by LUX Fight League on April 26, 2024, at the CODE Alcalde Dome in Guadalajara, Mexico.

=== Background ===
A fight for the LUX Welterweight Championship between champion Alan Domínguez and former LUX Middleweight Champion Nayib López headlined the event. It was a rematch of their fight at LUX 002, where López emerged victorious.

Juan Diaz was expected to defend his LUX Bantamweight Championship against Andre Barquero. However, Barquero had to withdraw from the fight due to injury, so his place was taken by Abraham Nava.

=== Results ===
Main card
| Weight class | | | | Method | Round | Time | Notes |
|---|---|---|---|---|---|---|---|
| Welterweight | Alan Domínguez (c) | def. | Nayib López | Decision (unanimous) | 5 | 5:00 | (Note: For the LUX Welterweight Championship) |
| Bantamweight | Juan Díaz (c) | def. | Abraham Nava | Decision (unanimous) | 5 | 5:00 | (Note: For the LUX Bantamweight Championship) |
| Catchweight | Brahyam Zurcher | def. | Ángel Rodríguez | TKO (punches) | 1 | 4:34 |
| Bantamweight | José Roura | def. | Mauricio Nievas | Decision (unanimous) | 3 | 5:00 |
| Catchweight | Hugo Flores | def. | Román Córdova | Submission (armbar) | 3 | 4:59 |
| Women's Strawweight | Andrea Vázquez | def. | Leticia Baltazar | Submission (rear-naked choke) | 2 | 4:00 |
| Flyweight | Axel Osuna | def. | Ricardo Husseín | Decision (unanimous) | 3 | 5:00 |
| Featherweight | Irvin Amaya | def. | Rafael Sáenz | TKO (body kick) | 2 | 2:54 |
| Flyweight | Jesús Siller | def. | Luis Cabrera | Decision (unanimous) | 3 | 5:00 |
| Catchweight | Fernanda Larios | def. | Damara Vargas | Decision (unanimous) | 3 | 5:00 |
| Bantamweight | Sergio Barajas | def. | Daniel Luna | KO (punches) | 2 | 2:03 |

== LUX 043 ==
LUX 043
- Promotion: LUX Fight League
- Date: June 28, 2024
- Venue: Gimnasio Marcelino González
- City: Zacatecas, Mexico

Event chronology
| LUX 042 | LUX 043 | LUX 044 |

LUX 043 was a mixed martial arts event held by LUX Fight League on June 28, 2024, at the Gimnasio Marcelino González in Zacatecas, Mexico.

=== Background ===
A fight for the LUX Featherweight Championship between champion Édgar Delgado Jiménez and José Alberto Quiñónez.

The co-main event featured a lightweight bout between undefeated in LUX Alejandro Corrales and newcomer Julio Ruiz.

=== Results ===
Main card
| Weight class | | | | Method | Round | Time | Notes |
|---|---|---|---|---|---|---|---|
| Featherweight | Édgar Delgado Jiménez (c) | def. | José Alberto Quiñónez | Submission (heel hook) | 1 | 4:18 | (Note: For the LUX Featherweight Championship) |
| Lightweight | Alejandro Corrales | def. | Julio Ruíz | Submission (ninja choke) | 3 | 0:50 |
| Featherweight | Diego Baltazar | def. | Carlos Rivera | Submission (armbar) | 1 | 0:49 |
| Bantamweight | Carlos Márquez | def. | Erick Montelongo | Decision (unanimous) | 3 | 5:00 |
| Flyweight | Víctor Nuñez | def. | Alexander Bastida | TKO (body kick) | 2 | 0:07 |
| Welterweight | Irving Molina | def. | Pedro Romero | TKO (punches) | 1 | 1:13 |
| Lightweight | Fabian Albuerne | def. | Nicolás Murdoch | Submission (rear-naked choke) | 1 | 2:47 |
| Lightweight | Omar Ortíz Robles | def. | Jesús Servando | Submission (rear-naked choke) | 1 | 4:28 |
| Catchweight | Anthony Ramírez | def. | Emmanuel Barajas | Submission (rear-naked choke) | 1 | 1:34 |
| Catchweight | Rafael de la Rosa | def. | Jonathan Saucedo Castillo | TKO (punches) | 1 | 4:58 |

== LUX 044 ==
LUX 044
- Promotion: LUX Fight League
- Date: August 2, 2024
- Venue: Frontón México
- City: Mexico City, Mexico

Event chronology
| LUX 043 | LUX 044 | LUX 045 |

LUX 044 was a mixed martial arts event held by LUX Fight League on August 2, 2024, at the Frontón México in Mexico City, Mexico.

=== Background ===
In mid-2022, Sergio Cossio vacated the LUX Lightweight Championship for the second time, although this time it was because he signed with Bellator MMA. To crown a new champion, a fight between former title challenger Hugo Flores and Luis Márquez was scheduled as the main event of this event.

The co-main event featured a catchweight bout between veterans Kazula Vargas and Román Córdova. Previously, in March 2024, the two faced off at Lutador MMA Invictus' LMI 13 event, which ended in victory for Vargas.

=== Results ===
Main card
| Weight class | | | | Method | Round | Time | Notes |
|---|---|---|---|---|---|---|---|
| Lightweight | Hugo Flores | def. | Luis Márquez | Decision (unanimous) | 5 | 5:00 | (Note: For the LUX Lightweight Championship) |
| Catchweight | Kazula Vargas | def. | Román Córdova | Submission (arm triangle choke) | 1 | 4:42 |
| Flyweight | Abdi Iniestra | def. | Andrés Ramos | Decision (unanimous) | 3 | 5:00 |
| Women's Strawweight | Hannah Ramos | def. | Sara Cova | Decision (unanimous) | 3 | 5:00 |
| Welterweight | Antonio Suárez | def. | Leonel Rojas | Decision (unanimous) | 3 | 5:00 |
| Featherweight | Alejandro Cerquera | def. | Fredy Villegas | TKO (punches) | 2 | 1:57 |
| Women's Strawweight | Jazmín Navarrete | def. | Yajáira Romo | Decision (unanimous) | 3 | 5:00 |
| Catchweight | Donny Matos | def. | Victor Nuñez | Decision (unanimous) | 3 | 5:00 |
| Women's Strawweight | Andrea Martínez | def. | Ana Segura | TKO (punches) | 1 | 2:54 |
| Bantamweight | Kevin Morales | def. | Erick García | Decision (split) | 3 | 5:00 |

== LUX 045 ==
LUX 045
- Promotion: LUX Fight League
- Date: August 26, 2024
- Venue: Showcenter Complex
- City: Monterrey, Mexico

Event chronology
| LUX 044 | LUX 045 | LUX 046 |

LUX 045 was a mixed martial arts event held by LUX Fight League on August 26, 2024, at the Showcenter Complex in Monterrey, Mexico.

=== Background ===
A fight for the LUX Flyweight Championship between champion Jorge Calvo Martin and undefeated prospect Alexandro Bravo headlined the event.

The co-main event featured a bantamweight fight between undefeated Emilio Saavedra and Uriel Cossio.

=== Results ===
Main card
| Weight class | | | | Method | Round | Time | Notes |
|---|---|---|---|---|---|---|---|
| Flyweight | Jorge Calvo Martin (c) | def. | Alexandro Bravo | Submission (rear-naked choke) | 3 | 4:53 | (Note: For the LUX Flyweight Championship) |
| Bantamweight | Uriel Cossio | def. | Emilio Saavedra | Submission (kimura) | 3 | 4:02 |
| Catchweight | Kike González | def. | Humberto Duarte | Decision (unanimous) | 3 | 5:00 |
| Flyweight | Luis Cabrera | def. | Alan Alexis Castro | KO (punch) | 1 | 0:09 |
| Bantamweight | Fabian López | def. | Alex Medellín | Decision (unanimous) | 3 | 5:00 |
| Flyweight | Paulino Siller | def. | Luis Elías | Decision (unanimous) | 3 | 5:00 |
| Women's Strawweight | Karla Pastrana | def. | Karen Martínez | Decision (split) | 3 | 5:00 |
| Women's Flyweight | Victoria Alba | def. | Sandra Chimeyo | KO (punch) | 1 | 1:48 |
| Welterweight | Silvestre Sánchez | def. | Matías Gauna | KO (punch) | 1 | 3:00 |

== LUX 046 ==
LUX 046
- Promotion: LUX Fight League
- Date: October 11, 2024
- Venue: Expo Tampico
- City: Tampico, Mexico

Event chronology
| LUX 045 | LUX 046 | LUX 047 |

LUX 046 was a mixed martial arts event held by LUX Fight League on October 11, 2024, at the Expo Tampico in Tampico, Mexico.

=== Background ===
A fight for the vacant LUX Women's Strawweight Championship between Andrea Vázquez and Jazmín Navarrete was announced as the main event.

=== Results ===
Main card
| Weight class | | | | Method | Round | Time | Notes |
|---|---|---|---|---|---|---|---|
| Women's Strawweight | Andrea Vázquez | def. | Jazmín Navarrete | Decision (unanimous) | 5 | 5:00 | (Note: For the LUX Women's Strawweight Championship) |
| Bantamweight | Jesús Siller | def. | Iván Hernández Flores | Decision (unanimous) | 3 | 5:00 |
| Bantamweight | Santiago Prieto | def. | César Vázquez | Submission (triangle armbar) | 2 | 1:47 |
| Welterweight | Anuar Aburto | def. | Erick Batista | Decision (unanimous) | 3 | 5:00 |
| Featherweight | Irvin Amaya | def. | Edgar García Cabello | TKO (punches) | 1 | 0:56 |
| Welterweight | Carlos Arana | def. | Irving Molina | KO (punches) | 1 | 0:53 |
| Bantamweight | Eliel Mota | def. | Jander Martínez | Decision (unanimous) | 3 | 5:00 |
| Flyweight | Gabriel Tovar | def. | Samuel Sierra | Decision (unanimous) | 3 | 5:00 |
| Bantamweight | Sergio Barajas | def. | Diego Alemán | Decision (unanimous) | 3 | 5:00 |
| Flyweight | Omar Hernández | def. | Emmanuel Barajas | Submission (rear-naked choke) | 1 | 1:35 |

== LUX 047 ==
LUX 047
- Promotion: LUX Fight League
- Date: November 1, 2024
- Venue: Frontón México
- City: Mexico City, Mexico

Event chronology
| LUX 046 | LUX 047 | LUX 048 |

LUX 047 was a mixed martial arts event held by LUX Fight League on November 1, 2024, at the Frontón México in Mexico City, Mexico.

=== Background ===
One for the LUX Bantamweight Championship between champion Juan Díaz and José Roura headlined the event. The duel was a rematch of LUX 038, where Díaz was crowned champion. In addition, the clash between the two is the first time that the title fight has headlined the card twice.

A fight for the vacant LUX Lightweight Championship between Kazula Vargas and Alejandro Cerquera was also scheduled.

=== Results ===
Main card
| Weight class | | | | Method | Round | Time | Notes |
|---|---|---|---|---|---|---|---|
| Bantamweight | Juan Díaz (c) | def. | José Roura | TKO (doctor stoppage) | 4 | 5:00 | (Note: For the LUX Bantamweight Championship) |
| Lightweight | Kazula Vargas | def. | Alejandro Cerquera | Submission (guillotine choke) | 2 | 1:40 | (Note: For the LUX Lightweight Championship) |
| Flyweight | Abdi Iniestra | def. | Luis Cabrera | Decision (split) | 3 | 5:00 |
| Flyweight | Luis Iván Rodríguez | def. | Sergio Quintero | TKO (punches) | 1 | 3:17 |
| Catchweight | Mauricio Partida | def. | Brandon Uruchurtu | KO (Knee to the Body) | 1 | 2:21 |
| Featherweight | Jefferson Vargas | def. | Isaac Samayoa | Decision (unanimous) | 3 | 5:00 |
| Women's Strawweight | Nicole Geraldo | def. | Solangel Vera | Decision (unanimous) | 3 | 5:00 |
| Flyweight | Anthony Ramírez | def. | Luis Quintana | Submission (armbar) | 1 | 2:48 |
| Women's Flyweight | Fernanda Larios | def. | Ivonne Caro | TKO (punches and elbows) | 3 | 4:40 |
| Bantamweight | Juan Zúñiga | def. | Jairo González | TKO (elbows and punches) | 1 | 2:35 |
| Catchweight | Ariadne Uriega | def. | Dulce Vázquez | Decision (unanimous) | 3 | 5:00 |

== LUX 048 ==
LUX 048
- Promotion: LUX Fight League
- Date: November 29, 2024
- Venue: Showcenter Complex
- City: Monterrey, Mexico

Event chronology
| LUX 047 | LUX 048 | LUX 049 |

LUX 048 was a mixed martial arts event held by LUX Fight League on November 29, 2024, at the Showcenter Complex in Monterrey, Mexico.

=== Background ===
A rematch for the LUX Flyweight Championship between champion Jorge Calvo Martin and Kike González headlined the event. The two previously faced off at LUX 041, which ended with Calvo retaining his title in what was one of the bloodiest fights in modern MMA history.

The co-main event was a fight for the LUX Featherweight Championship between Édgar Delgado Jiménez and Alejandro Corrales.

=== Results ===
Main card
| Weight class | | | | Method | Round | Time | Notes |
|---|---|---|---|---|---|---|---|
| Flyweight | Jorge Calvo Martin (c) | def. | Kike González | Decision (unanimous) | 5 | 5:00 | (Note: For the LUX Featherweight Championship) |
| Featherweight | Édgar Delgado Jiménez (c) | def. | Alejandro Corrales | Submission (rear-naked choke) | 4 | 2:59 | (Note: For the LUX Flyweight Championship) |
| Featherweight | Isaac Ruelas | def. | Pedro Piña | TKO (punches) | 2 | 3:26 |
| Women's Strawweight | Hannah Ramos | def. | Karen Martínez | Submission (triangle armbar) | 1 | 1:42 |
| Bantamweight | Cesar Vázquez Jr. | def. | Uriel Uribe | Decision (unanimous) | 3 | 5:00 |
| Bantamweight | André Barquero | def. | Abraham Nava | Submission (triangle choke) | 1 | 2:13 |
| Women's Strawweight | Daniela Hernández | def. | Karla Pastrana | Decision (split) | 3 | 5:00 |
| Catchweight | Hugo Torres | def. | Luis Quintana | TKO (punches) | 2 | 3:52 |
| Women's Flyweight | Victoria Alba | def. | Susset Gomez | Decision (unanimous) | 3 | 5:00 |
| Welterweight | Silvestre Sánchez | def. | Jafeth Quiros | Submission (rear-naked choke) | 3 | 2:03 |
| Welterweight | Kevin Villarreal | def. | Eduardo García | TKO (body kick) | 2 | 3:15 |
