= 2021 in LUX Fight League =

Information
- First date: March 12, 2021
- Last date: December 10, 2021

Events
- Total events: 8

Fights
- Total fights: 91
- Title fights: 7

The year 2021 was the 5th year in the history of LUX Fight League, a mixed martial arts promotion based in Mexico. In these year, LUX held 8 events.

== Events list ==
#	Event	Date held	Venue	City
1	LUX 012	March 12, 2021	Showcenter Complex	Monterrey, Mexico
2	LUX 013	May 7, 2021	Showcenter Complex	Monterrey, Mexico
3	LUX 014	June 25, 2021	Showcenter Complex	Monterrey, Mexico
4	LUX 015	August 6, 2021	Showcenter Complex	Monterrey, Mexico
5	LUX 016	September 17, 2021	Pepsi Center WTC	Mexico City, Mexico
6	LUX 017	October 15, 2021	Showcenter Complex	Monterrey, Mexico
7	LUX 018	November 5, 2021	Forum de Mundo Imperial	Acapulco, Mexico
8	LUX 019	December 10, 2021	Pepsi Center WTC	Mexico City, Mexico

== LUX 012 ==
LUX 012
- Promotion: LUX Fight League
- Date: March 12, 2021
- Venue: Showcenter Complex
- City: Monterrey, Mexico

Event chronology
LUX 011	LUX 012	LUX 013

LUX 012 was a mixed martial arts event held by LUX Fight League on March 12, 2021, at the Showcenter Complex in Monterrey, Mexico.

=== Background ===
A fight for the LUX Featherweight Championship between champion Diego Lopes and Masio Fullen was scheduled for the main event.

Another fight scheduled for this event was the first of two semifinals in the Torneo Guerreras LUX for the women's strawweight title: Saray Orozco vs. Alejandra Orozco.

=== Results ===
Main card
Weight class				Method	Round	Time	Notes
Featherweight	Diego Lopes (c)	def.	Masio Fullen	Submission (armbar)	3	3:06	(Note: For the LUX Featherweight Championship)
Women's Strawweight	Saray Orozco	def.	Alejandra Orozco	Decision (unanimous)	3	5:00	(Note: Semifinals of the Torneo Guerreras LUX)
Lightweight	Miguel Villegas	def.	Édgar Delgado Jiménez	Decision (split)	3	5:00
Lightweight	Alex Sánchez	def.	Rubén Lozano	TKO (leg kicks)	1	3:12
Featherweight	Erik Silva	def.	Erik Radleim	Submission (keylock)	1	1:33
Bantamweight	Irvin Amaya	def.	Carlos Rivera	Decision (unanimous)	3	5:00
Catchweight	Kevin Morales	def.	José Armendariz	Decision (unanimous)	3	5:00
Catchweight	Emilio Cuéllar	def.	Luis Rey Gallegos	KO (head kick)	1	2:31
Catchweight	Esteban Negrete	def.	Hiram Furukawa	Submission (keylock)	1	3:33
Flyweight	Uriel Uribe	def.	Jaay Ramírez	TKO (punches)	1	0:27
Bantamweight	José Roura	def.	Julio Chapa	Decision (unanimous)	3	5:00
Welterweight	Pedro Romero	def.	Leonardo Blasco	DQ (illegal kick)	3	1:33
Bantamweight	Eduardo García	def.	Yair Bautista	Submission (rear-naked choke)	1	3:30

== LUX 013 ==
LUX 013
- Promotion: LUX Fight League
- Date: May 7, 2021
- Venue: Showcenter Complex
- City: Monterrey, Mexico

Event chronology
LUX 012	LUX 013	LUX 014

LUX 013 was a mixed martial arts event held by LUX Fight League on May 7, 2021, at the Showcenter Complex in Monterrey, Mexico.

=== Background ===
A fight for the LUX Flyweight Championship between champion Alessandro Costa and Jorge Calvo Martin headlined the event.

The co-main event featured a lightweight bout between Polo Reyes and Marco Antonio Elpidio.

In addition, the other semifinal of the Torneo Guerreras LUX was held to determine the women's strawweight title: Tania Torres vs. Yaneth Vidal.

=== Results ===
Main card
Weight class				Method	Round	Time	Notes
Flyweight	Alessandro Costa (c)	def.	Jorge Calvo Martin	TKO (punches)	1	2:34	(Note: For the LUX Flyweight Championship)
Lightweight	Polo Reyes	def.	Marco Antonio Elpidio	Decision (unanimous)	3	5:00
Women's Strawweight	Tania Torres	def.	Yaneth Vidal	TKO (punches)	1	1:46
Bantamweight	Eríck Rodríguez	def.	Jordi Maya	Submission (guillotine choke)	1	1:22
Lightweight	Daniel Zellhuber	def.	Martin González	TKO (punches)	1	1:12
Lightweight	Francesco Patrón	def.	Uriel Cossio	TKO (punches)	1	0:25
Women's Bantamweight	Eli Rodríguez	def.	Yessica Ortega	Decision (unanimous)	3	5:00
Lightweight	Gabriel Morales	def.	Carlos Ochoa	Decision (split)	3	5:00
Lightweight	Alan Domínguez	def.	Javier Rodríguez	TKO (knee and punches)	2	4:25
Bantamweight	Pedro Peña	def.	Alejandro Villarreal	TKO (punches)	2	3:10
Bantamweight	Héctor Ferral	def.	Mauricio Nievas	KO (punch)	1	0:27

== LUX 014 ==
LUX 014
- Promotion: LUX Fight League
- Date: June 25, 2021
- Venue: Showcenter Complex
- City: Monterrey, Mexico

Event chronology
LUX 013	LUX 014	LUX 015

LUX 014 was a mixed martial arts event held by LUX Fight League on June 25, 2021, at the Showcenter Complex in Monterrey, Mexico.

=== Background ===
A fight for the LUX Bantamweight Championship between champion Marco Beltrán and David Mendoza headlined the event. It was a rematch of their fight at LUX 009, which ended in victory for Beltrán.

The co-main event featured a flyweight bout between Luis Solorzano and Diego Ortiz.

=== Results ===
Main card
Weight class				Method	Round	Time	Notes
Bantamweight	Marco Beltrán (c)	def.	David Mendoza	Submission (rear-naked choke)	1	4:24	(Note: For the LUX Bantamweight Championship)
Flyweight	Luis Solorzano	def.	Diego Ortíz	TKO (punches)	2	2:54
Middleweight	Iván Valenzuela	def.	Esteban Negrete	Submission (guillotine choke)	1	1:25
Flyweight	Emilio Cuéllar	def.	Jaime Granados	Decision (split)	3	5:00
Bantamweight	Uriel Uribe	def.	Alexis Ramírez	Decision (unanimous)	3	5:00
Flyweight	Jorge Calvo Martin	def.	Jesús Gutiérrez	Submission (rear-naked choke)	3	2:28
Catchweight	Kevin García	def.	Carlos Márquez	Submission (rear-naked choke)	2	4:25
Women's Flyweight	Daniela Villasmil	def.	Damara Vargas	Decision (split)	3	5:00
Lightweight	Erick Garibay	def.	Irving Cardona	TKO (punches)	1	2:41
Women's Flyweight	Andrea Vázquez	def.	Hannah Ramos	Decision (majoritary)	3	5:00
Bantamweight	Luis Piñango	def.	Alejandro Guerrero	Decision (unanimous)	3	5:00

== LUX 015 ==
LUX 015
- Promotion: LUX Fight League
- Date: August 26, 2021
- Venue: Showcenter Complex
- City: Monterrey, Mexico

Event chronology
LUX 014	LUX 015	LUX 016

LUX 015 was a mixed martial arts event held by LUX Fight League on August 26, 2021, at the Showcenter Complex in Monterrey, Mexico.

=== Background ===
The final of the Torneo Guerreras LUX, which crowned the first strawweight champion between Saray Orozco and Tania Torres, was the first time that two women headlined a LUX event. Prior to the fight, Orozco was coming off a narrow unanimous decision victory at LUX 012, and Torres was coming off a TKO victory at LUX 013.

The co-main event featured a featherweight bout between Erik Silva and Daniel Vega.

=== Results ===
Main card
Weight class				Method	Round	Time	Notes
Women's Flyweight	Tania Torres	def.	Saray Orozco	Decision (majority)	5	5:00	(Note: Final of the Torneo Guerreras LUX; for the LUX Women's Strawweight Championship)
Bantamweight	Erik Silva	def.	Daniel Vega	Submission (rear-naked choke)	1	1:21
Lightweight	Marco Antonio Elpidio	def.	Jafeth Quiros	Decision (unanimous)	3	5:00
Bantamweight	Irvin Amaya	def.	Antonio Rodríguez	Decision (unanimous)	3	5:00
Bantamweight	Francesco Patrón	def.	Erik Radleim	Submission (straight armbar)	1	4:09
Featherweight	Édgar Delgado Jiménez	def.	Antonio Ramírez	Decision (unanimous)	3	5:00
Bantamweight	Luis Rey Gallegos	def.	Benjamin Méndez	TKO (punches)	3	3:02
Bantamweight	Mauricio Nievas	def.	Mario Tena	Decision (split)	3	5:00
Flyweight	Luis Iván Rodríguez	def.	Alejandro Villarreal	Submission (rear-naked choke)	3	2:32
Bantamweight	José Roura	def.	Abraham Nava	KO (punch)	3	2:36
Middleweight	Anuar Aburto	def.	Fernando Oliva	Submission (triangle choke)	1	1:28

== LUX 016 ==
LUX 016
- Promotion: LUX Fight League
- Date: September 17, 2021
- Venue: Pepsi Center WTC
- City: Mexico City, Mexico

Event chronology
LUX 015	LUX 016	LUX 017

LUX 016 was a mixed martial arts event held by LUX Fight League on September 17, 2021, at the Pepsi Center WTC in Mexico City, Mexico.

=== Background ===
A fight for the LUX Lightweight Championship between champion Sergio Cossio and Alan Domínguez headlined the event.

The co-main event featured a lightweight bout between two newcomers to LUX, Alejandro “Pato” Martínez and Gian Franco Cortéz.

=== Results ===
Main card
Weight class				Method	Round	Time	Notes
Lightweight	Sergio Cossio (c)	def.	Alan Domínguez	Submission (rear-naked choke)	1	1:25	(Note: For the LUX Lightweight Championship)
Lightweight	Alejandro Martínez	def.	Gian Franco Cortéz	Decision (unanimous)	3	5:00
Featherweight	Edgar García Cabello	def.	Allan Zúñiga	Decision (unanimous)	3	5:00
Bantamweight	César Vázquez	def.	Juan Pablo González	Decision (unanimous)	3	5:00
Flyweight	Fernando Saavedra	def.	Jesús Gutiérrez	Decision (split)	3	5:00
Bantamweight	Jaime Londoño	def.	Diego Silva	Submission (rear-naked choke)	1	3:08
Lightweight	Roger García	def.	José Armendariz	Submission (rear-naked choke)	2	1:25
Bantamweight	Santiago Prieto	def.	Erik Neftaly Martínez	Submission (heel hook)	1	1:06
Women's Bantamweight	Nicole Geraldo	def.	Brenda Arias	TKO (doctor stoppage)	2	5:00
Catchweight	Jonas Ortega	def.	Joel Gómez	Submission (guillotine choke)	1	1:26
Bantamweight	Alexis León	def.	Eduardo García	TKO (punches)	3	4:15

== LUX 017 ==
LUX 017
- Promotion: LUX Fight League
- Date: October 15, 2021
- Venue: Showcenter Complex
- City: Monterrey, Mexico

Event chronology
LUX 016	LUX 017	LUX 018

LUX 017 was a mixed martial arts event held by LUX Fight League on October 15, 2021, at the Showcenter Complex in Monterrey, Mexico.

=== Background ===
Marco Beltrán was expected to make his second title defense of the LUX Bantamweight Championship against Francesco Patrón. However, LUX announced in a statement that the fight had been canceled.

=== Results ===
Main card
Weight class				Method	Round	Time	Notes
Middleweight	Iván Valenzuela	def.	Brandon Kesler	TKO (punches)	1	1:44
Women's Flyweight	Victoria Alba	def.	Andrea Vázquez	Decision (split)	3	5:00
Bantamweight	Pedro Peña	def.	Jorge Manzano	Decision (split)	3	5:00
Bantamweight	Carlos Camargo	def.	Eduardo Rodríguez	TKO (punches)	1	1:36
Lightweight	Fabian López	def.	Marcelo Morelli	Decision (unanimous)	3	5:00
Bantamweight	Cesar Vázquez Jr.	def.	Christian Cerda	Decision (unanimous)	3	5:00
Featherweight	Efraín Montemayor	def.	Yahir Bautista	TKO (punches)	1	0:46
Bantamweight	Alexandro Bravo	def.	Juan Rebollado	Decision (unanimous)	3	5:00
Women's Flyweight	Daniela Villasmil	def.	Eli Rodríguez	Decision (split)	3	5:00
Catchweight	Emilio Saavedra	def.	Luis Ortíz	Decision (unanimous)	3	5:00
Catchweight	Álvaro Torres	def.	Luis Cervantes	Decision (unanimous)	3	5:00

== LUX 018 ==
LUX 018
- Promotion: LUX Fight League
- Date: November 5, 2021
- Venue: Forum de Mundo Imperial
- City: Acapulco, Mexico

Event chronology
LUX 017	LUX 018	LUX 019

LUX 018 was a mixed martial arts event held by LUX Fight League on November 5, 2021, at the Forum de Mundo Imperial in Acapulco, Mexico.

=== Background ===
A fight for the LUX Flyweight Championship between champion Alessandro Costa and Kike González headlined the event.

=== Results ===
Main card
Weight class				Method	Round	Time	Notes
Flyweight	Alessandro Costa (c)	def.	Kike González	TKO (punches)	3	1:37	(Note: For the LUX Flyweight Championship)
Lightweight	Fernando Martínez	def.	Polo Reyes	Submission (guillotine choke)	1	4:03
Featherweight	Edgar García Cabello	def.	Pablo Sánchez	TKO (punches)	1	1:02
Flyweight	Luis Iván Rodríguez	def.	Uriel Uribe	Submission (guillotine choke)	2	3:29
Bantamweight	Ramón Cardozo	def.	Luis Martínez	Decision (unanimous)	3	5:00
Bantamweight	Kevin García	def.	Carlos Rivera	Decision (split)	3	5:00
Lightweight	Leandro Urquiza	def.	Zayeq Herrera	Decision (unanimous)	3	5:00
Bantamweight	Mauricio Partida	def.	Luis Piñango	TKO (retirement)	1	5:00
Women's Strawweight	Laura Zamora	def.	Yaneth Vidal	Decision (unanimous)	3	5:00
Lightweight	Alejandro Gavidia	def.	Irving Cardona	Decision (unanimous)	3	5:00
Middleweight	Ramón Grano	def.	Ricardo Chávez Villaseñor	Decision (unanimous)	3	5:00

== LUX 019 ==
LUX 019
- Promotion: LUX Fight League
- Date: December 10, 2021
- Venue: Pepsi Center WTC
- City: Mexico City, Mexico

Event chronology
LUX 018	LUX 019	LUX 020

LUX 019 was a mixed martial arts event held by LUX Fight League on December 10, 2021, at the Pepsi Center WTC in Mexico City, Mexico.

=== Background ===
A fight between Iván Valenzuela and Ricardo Centeno for the inaugural LUX Middleweight Championship headlined the event.

=== Results ===
Main card
Weight class				Method	Round	Time	Notes
Middleweight	Iván Valenzuela	def.	Ricardo Centeno	TKO (punches and knees)	1	4:45	(Note: For the LUX Middleweight Championship)
Catchweight	Alejandro Martínez	def.	Édgar Delgado Jiménez	Decision (split)	3	5:00
Flyweight	Diego Ortíz	def.	Erick Rodríguez	Submission (rear-naked choke)	3	1:39
Bantamweight	David Mendoza	def.	Fredy Villegas	Decision (unanimous)	3	5:00
Bantamweight	José Roura	def.	Marcelo Morrelli	Submission (rear-naked choke)	2	2:58
Bantamweight	Erik Radleim	def.	Luis Rey Gallegos	Decision (split)	3	5:00
Women's Strawweight	Nicole Geraldo	def.	Mariana Ruíz Avila	Decision (unanimous)	3	5:00
Middleweight	Anuar Aburto	def.	Emmanuel González	TKO (punches)	1	1:36
Bantamweight	Kevin Morales	def.	Jonathan Saavedra	Submission (arm-triangle choke)	1	1:02
Lightweight	Luis Márquez	def.	Mauricio Díaz	TKO (punches)	1	4:14
Featherweight	Bryan Arreaga	def.	Jonas Ortega	Submission (arm-triangle choke)	1	3:01
