= Streamers Smash =

Mixed martial arts competition

- Company type: Private
- Industry: Mixed martial arts competition
- Founded: 2025
- Founder: Joe Mendoza
- Headquarters: Mexico City, Mexico
- Key people: Joe Mendoza (CEO & President, LUX Fight League); Diego Ruzzarín (Host); Yael Romero (Host)
- Owner: LUX Fight League
- Website: streamerssmash.com

Streamers Smash is a Mexican mixed martial arts competition created by LUX Fight League CEO Joe Mendoza. The competition consists of a single-elimination tournament featuring eight fighters who will have a streamer in their corner, competing for a coveted contract with LUX.

== History ==
In October 2024, Mexican MMA promotion LUX Fight League, together with marketing company Top Talent México, announced the creation of an event that would combine sport with the rise of streaming. On October 14, LUX CEO Joe Mendoza announced that there would be a press conference to reveal which streamers would be in the fighters' corners during the competition.

Both the first two rounds and the semifinals of the inaugural edition of the tournament were held after a regular LUX event; that is, the two rounds took place on the same date as LUX 049 (January 31) and LUX 050 (February 21), and the semifinals were held after LUX 052 (May 15).

The first final took place on August 22, 2025, during the LUX 054 card. There, Gerardo Sánchez and Zaid Varela faced off in a flyweight bout, which ended with a victory for Sánchez by unanimous decision, earning him a contract with LUX.

== Corners ==
The following streamers were selected as the eight cornerpeople who guided a fighter.

Streamer/Corner	Occupation
Vicky Palami	Content creator and Twitch streamer.
Barcagamer	Streamer and President of La Raniza FC, a team in the Kings League Mexico.
Crystal Molly	Streamer and awards host.
Daniel Borjas	Streamer and tiktoker.
Zilverk	Youtuber and streamer.
Yami Rootz	Content creator and streamer.
Ronny	Professional boxer.
El Guefe	Streamer.

== Editions ==
Year	Winner(s)	Runner(s) up	Weight division	Date	Event	Localization
2025	Gerardo Sánchez	Zaid Varela	Flyweight	August 22, 2025	LUX 054	Monterrey, Nuevo León

== List of events ==
#	Event	Date	Venue	Location	Ref.
3	Streamers Smash 3: Semifinales	May 15, 2025	CODE Alcalde Dome	Guadalajara, Jalisco, Mexico	
2	Streamers Smash 2	February 21, 2025	Showcenter Complex	Monterrey, Nuevo León, Mexico	
1	Streamers Smash 1	January 31, 2025	Frontón México	Mexico City, Mexico	
