= 2020 in LUX Fight League =

Information
- First date: February 14, 2020
- Last date: November 20, 2020

Events
- Total events: 4

Fights
- Total fights: 45
- Title fights: 3

The year 2020 was the fourth year in the history of LUX Fight League, a mixed martial arts promotion based in Mexico. In these year, LUX held 4 events.

== Events list ==
#	Event	Date held	Venue	City
1	LUX 008	February 14, 2020	Frontón México	Mexico City, Mexico
2	LUX 009	July 17, 2020	Showcenter Complex	Monterrey, Mexico
3	LUX 010	September 18, 2020	Showcenter Complex	Monterrey, Mexico
4	LUX 011	November 20, 2020	Showcenter Complex	Monterrey, Mexico

== LUX 008 ==
LUX 008
- Promotion: LUX Fight League
- Date: February 14, 2020
- Venue: Frontón México
- City: Mexico City, Mexico

Event chronology
LUX 007	LUX 008	LUX 009

LUX 008 was a mixed martial arts event held by LUX Fight League on February 14, 2020, at the Frontón México in Mexico City, Mexico.

=== Background ===
A fight between Sergio Cossio and Hugo Flores for the LUX Lightweight Championship (which was vacant after Diego Lopes' departure) was scheduled as the main event. The two had already faced each other two years earlier at LUX 003, which ended in victory for Cossio.

A featherweight bout between former UFC and Brave CF fighter Masio Fullen and Carlos Cañada was announced for the co-main event.

=== Results ===
Main card
Weight class				Method	Round	Time	Notes
Lightweight	Sergio Cossio	def.	Hugo Flores	Decision (unanimous)	5	5:00	(Note: For the LUX Lightweight Championship)
Featherweight	Masio Fullen	def.	Carlos Cañada	TKO (elbows and punches)	1	2:22
Featherweight	Daniel Vega	def.	Antonio Márquez	Submission (rear-naked choke)	1	3:30
Catchweight	Ronaldo Rodríguez	def.	Dagoberto Ferreira	TKO (elbows)	2	1:35
Lightweight	Genaro Valdez	def.	Miguel Arizmendi	TKO (punches)	1	4:47
Bantamweight	Emilio Cuéllar	def.	Alexis Ramírez	TKO (punches)	3	1:44
Bantamweight	César Vázquez	def.	Luis Rey Gallegos	Submission (guillotine choke)	3	0:32
Lightweight	Jafeth Quiros	def.	Alan Domínguez	Submission (rear-naked choke)	1	4:26
Women's Strawweight	Tania Torres	def.	Yaneth Vidal	Decision (unanimous)	3	5:00
Flyweight	Erick Rodríguez	def.	Luis Balderas	Submission (guillotine choke)	3	1:27
Welterweight	David Briones	def.	Jesús Martínez	Decision (unanimous)	3	5:00
Bantamweight	José Roura	def.	Carlos Márquez	Submission (rear-naked choke)	2	4:42

== LUX 009 ==
LUX 009
- Promotion: LUX Fight League
- Date: July 17, 2020
- Venue: Showcenter Complex
- City: Monterrey, Mexico

Event chronology
LUX 008	LUX 009	LUX 010

LUX 009 was a mixed martial arts event held by LUX Fight League on July 17, 2020, at the Showcenter Complex in Monterrey, Mexico.

=== Background ===
A fight between Marco Beltrán and David Mendoza for the LUX Bantamweight Championship was scheduled as the main event.

At this event, an eight-woman tournament called the Torneo Guerreras LUX ("LUX Warrior Tournament") was launched for the inaugural LUX Women's Strawweight Championship, with one of the fights pitting Saray Orozco against Yajáira Romo.

=== Results ===
Main card
Weight class				Method	Round	Time	Notes
Bantamweight	Marco Beltrán (c)	def.	David Mendoza	Decision (unanimous)	5	5:00	(Note: For the LUX Bantamweight Championship)
Lightweight	Genaro Valdez	def.	Edgar Díaz Guzmán	Submission (rear-naked choke)	1	2:34
Women's Strawweight	Saray Orozco	def.	Yajáira Romo	Decision (unanimous)	3	5:00	(Note: Quarterfinals of the Torneo Guerreras LUX)
Bantamweight	Luis Guerrero	def.	Luis Rey Gallegos	TKO (body kick)	1	2:40
Catchweight	Rubén Lozano	def.	Diego Rivera	TKO (punches)	1	1:06
Flyweight	Kike González	def.	Alfredo Moreno	Decision (unanimous)	3	5:00
Catchweight	Iván Valenzuela	def.	Ricardo Chávez Villaseñor	Decision (unanimous)	3	5:00
Catchweight	Luis Medrano	def.	David Briones	Decision (unanimous)	3	5:00
Catchweight	César Vázquez	def.	Adrian Vázquez	TKO (punches)	1	3:20
Catchweight	Andrés Farrera	def.	Ricardo Garza	TKO (punches)	2	3:36

== LUX 010 ==
LUX 010
- Promotion: LUX Fight League
- Date: September 18, 2020
- Venue: Showcenter Complex
- City: Monterrey, Mexico

Event chronology
LUX 009	LUX 010	LUX 011

LUX 010 was a mixed martial arts event held by LUX Fight League on September 18, 2020, at the Showcenter Complex in Monterrey, Mexico.

=== Background ===
The event marked the return of the public (albeit limited) to the venue since LUX 008 due to the COVID-19 pandemic that continued to ravage the world, and was also the first sporting event in Mexico and one of the first MMA events globally to do so.

A fight between Alessandro Costa and Luis Solorzano for the inaugural LUX Flyweight Championship was announced as the main event.

The co-main event featured Masio Fullen and Dumar Roa in the featherweight division.

In addition, three fights from the Torneo Guerreras LUX were announced for this event: Yaneth Vidal vs. Ana Guerrero, Alejandra Orozco vs. Judith Bolaños, and Laura Zamora vs. Tania Torres.

=== Results ===
Main card
Weight class				Method	Round	Time	Notes
Flyweight	Alessandro Costa	def.	Luis Solorzano	Decision (unanimous)	5	5:00	(Note: For the LUX Flyweight Championship)
Featherweight	Masio Fullen	def.	Dumar Roa	Decision (unanimous)	3	5:00
Women's Strawweight	Tania Torres	def.	Laura Zamora	Decision (unanimous)	3	5:00	(Note: Quarterfinals of the Torneo Guerreras LUX)
Lightweight	Pablo Sabori	def.	Alejandro Marroquín	TKO (punches)	3	0:30
Women's Flyweight	Alejandra Orozco	def.	Judith Bolaños	Decision (unanimous)	3	5:00	(Note: Quarterfinals of the Torneo Guerreras LUX)
Lightweight	Daniel Zellhuber	def.	Miguel Arizmendi	Submission (calf slicer)	1	4:45
Women's Strawweight	Yaneth Vidal	def.	Ana Guerrero	Decision (split)	3	5:00	(Note: Quarterfinals of the Torneo Guerreras LUX)
Featherweight	Antonio Rodríguez	def.	Gianni Vázquez	Decision (unanimous)	3	5:00
Lightweight	Francesco Patrón	def.	Benjamin Méndez	Submission (toe hold)	2	3:01
Bantamweight	Eríck Rodriguez	def.	Alejandro Armenta	Submission (rear-naked choke)	1	4:24
Bantamweight	Ramón Cardozo	def.	Carlos Mascorro	Submission (arm-triangle choke)	1	0:37
Featherweight	Pedro Piña	def.	Andrés Farrera	KO (punch)	1	1:19
Welterweight	José Armendariz	def.	Jonathan Saavedra	TKO (punches)	1	2:17

== LUX 011 ==
LUX 011
- Promotion: LUX Fight League
- Date: November 20, 2020
- Venue: Showcenter Complex
- City: Monterrey, Mexico

Event chronology
LUX 010	LUX 011	LUX 012

LUX 011 was a mixed martial arts event held by LUX Fight League on November 20, 2020, at the Showcenter Complex in Monterrey, Mexico.

=== Background ===
The main event featured a lightweight bout between Polo Reyes and Ricardo Arreola in Reyes' debut after his stint in UFC.

=== Results ===
Main card
Weight class				Method	Round	Time	Notes
Featherweight	Polo Reyes	def.	Ricardo Arreola	TKO (punches)	1	4:08
Lightweight	Pablo Sabori	vs.	Erivan Pereira	NC (doctor stoppage)	1	5:00
Featherweight	David Mendoza	def.	Jesús Ramos	Submission (arm-triangle choke)	2	2:27
Flyweight	Jorge Calvo Martin	def.	Gerardo Graniel	Submission (arm-triangle choke)	2	4:01
Bantamweight	Ramón Cardozo	def.	César Vázquez	Decision (unanimous)	3	5:00
Welterweight	Iván Valenzuela	def.	Carlos Chable	TKO (punches)	1	1:05
Flyweight	Jaime Granados	def.	Alexis Ramírez	Decision (unanimous)	3	5:00
Women's Flyweight	Silvana Gómez Juárez	def.	Diana Reyes	TKO (punches)	1	4:40
Lightweight	Alan Domínguez	def.	Jesús Martínez	TKO (punches)	1	4:51
Featherweight	Gabriel Morales	def.	Jair Pérez	KO (punch)	1	3:26
