= LUX Fight League =

Mixed martial arts promotion company

- Current season, competition or edition: 2026 in LUX Fight League
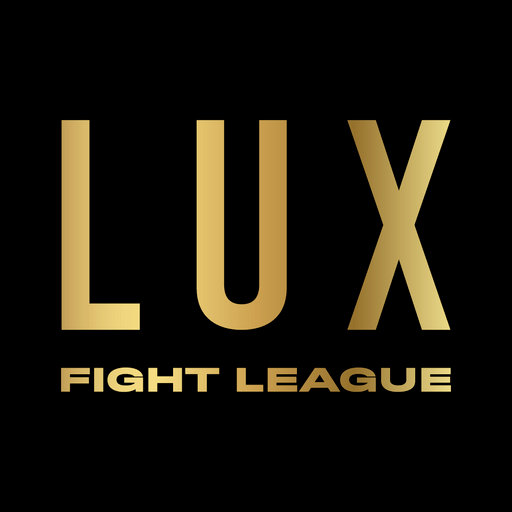
- Sport: Mixed martial arts promotion
- Founded: 21 July 2017; 9 years ago
- Founder: Joe Mendoza
- Owner: Private
- Country: Mexico
- Website: luxfightleague.com

LUX Fight League (or simply LUX) is a Mexican mixed martial arts promotion based in Mexico City, founded by Joe Mendoza. It is considered the largest MMA promotion in Mexico and one of the most important in Latin America.

== History ==
The promotion was founded on July 21, 2017 by Mexican businessman Joe Mendoza. The inaugural LUX event took place on that same date in Tampico, Tamaulipas, featuring veteran Mexican fighter Efraín Escudero, who scored a victory over Brazilian Bruno Murata.

The second LUX event was held on February 17, 2018, at the Gimnasio Olímpico Juan de la Barrera in Mexico City. Compared to the first event, which featured only four fights, this one held a total of nine.

Due to the COVID-19 pandemic that was declared in March 2020, "LUX 009" was held at the Showcenter Complex in Monterrey behind closed doors, after previously being scheduled for April 3. The next event, "LUX 010", would mark the return of the public, albeit limited to prevent virus infections, and would be the first sporting event in Mexico since the start of the pandemic to open its doors to the public.

In February 2024, Mendoza and the Ultimate Fighting Championship (UFC) closed a multinational agreement in which the UFC Fight Pass platform would broadcast LUX events from then on. The first event broadcast by the aforementioned platform was LUX 040, whose main event was between Raúl Zaragoza and Anuar Aburto in the welterweight division.

In 2025, LUX announced the creation of "Streamers Smash", a competition that brings together fighters and streamers, the winner of which obtains a contract with the promotion. The single-elimination tournament consists of eight amateur fighters who will have a streamer in their corner guiding them during the fights.

== Current champions ==
Division	Upper weight limit	Champion	Since	Title Defenses
Middleweight	84 kg (185.2 lb)	Vacant	/	-
Welterweight	77 kg (169.8 lb)	(Mexico) Martín González	February 13, 2026 (LUX 058)	0
Lightweight	71 kg (156.5 lb)	(Mexico) Alejandro Flores García	August 14, 2026 (LUX 062)	0
Featherweight	66 kg (145.5 lb)	(Mexico) Irvin Amaya	November 21, 2025 (LUX 056)	0
Bantamweight	61 kg (134.5 lb)	Vacant	/	-
Flyweight	57 kg (125.7 lb)	(Mexico) Paulino Siller	February 13, 2026 (LUX 058)	0
Women's Flyweight	57 kg (125.7 lb)	Vacant	/	-
Women's Strawweight	53 kg (116.8 lb)	(Uruguay) Melany Gómez	May 29, 2026 (LUX 061)	0

== LUX Fight League title history ==
=== Men's Middleweight Championship ===
No.	Name	Event	Date	Reign (total)	Defenses
1	(Mexico) Iván Valenzuela def. Ricardo Centeno	LUX 019; Mexico City, Mexico	Dec 10, 2021	420 days	
2	(Mexico) Nayib López	LUX 030; Monterrey, Mexico	Feb 3, 2023	71 days	
López vacated the title.

=== Men's Welterweight Championship ===
No.	Name	Event	Date	Reign (total)	Defenses
1	(Mexico) Alan Domínguez def. Antonio Suárez	LUX 036; Guadalajara, Mexico	Oct 6, 2023	? days	1. def. Nayib López at LUX 042 on Apr 26, 2024
Domínguez vacated the title.
2	(Mexico) Raúl Zaragoza def. Carlos Arana	LUX 049; Mexico City, Mexico	Jan 31, 2025	? days	
Zaragoza vacated the title.
3	(Mexico) Antonio Suárez def. Anuar Aburto	LUX 055; Guadalajara, Mexico	Sept 26, 2025	103 days	
Suárez vacated the title.
4	(Mexico) Martín González def. Alan Domínguez	LUX 058; Monterrey, Mexico	Feb 13, 2026		

=== Men's Lightweight Championship ===
No.	Name	Event	Date	Reign (total)	Defenses
1	(Chile) Ignacio Bahamondes def. Hugo Flores	LUX 004; Mexico City, Mexico	Mar 15, 2019	232 days	
Bahamondes vacated the title.
2	(Mexico) Sergio Cossio def. Hugo Flores	LUX 008; Mexico City, Mexico	Feb 14, 2020	? days	1. def. Alan Domínguez at LUX 016 on Sept 17, 2021
Cossio vacated the title.
3	(Mexico) Sergio Cossio (2) def. Édgar Delgado	LUX 022; Mexico City, Mexico	May 26, 2022	? days	1. def. Fernando Martínez at LUX 029 on Dec 9, 2022
Cossio vacated the title.
4	(Mexico) Hugo Flores def. Luis Márquez	LUX 044; Mexico City, Mexico	Aug 2, 2024	? days	
Flores vacated the title.
5	(Mexico) Kazula Vargas def. Alejandro Cerquera	LUX 047; Mexico City, Mexico	Nov 1, 2024	77 days	
—	(Mexico) Hugo Flores def. Raúl Zaragoza	LUX 052; Guadalajara, Mexico	May 16, 2025	—	
6	(Mexico) Miguel Villegas	LUX 060; Guadalajara, Mexico	Apr 24, 2026	112 days	
7	(Mexico) Alejandro Flores García	LUX 062; Monterrey, Mexico	Aug 14, 2026		

=== Men's Featherweight Championship ===
No.	Name	Event	Date	Reign (total)	Defenses
1	(Brazil) Diego Lopes def. Alejandro Solano Rodríguez	LUX 006; Monterrey, Mexico	Aug 30, 2019	732 days	1. def. Marco Beltrán at LUX 007 on Nov 29, 2019; 2. def. Masio Fullen at LUX 012 on Mar 12, 2021
Lopes vacated the title.
2	(Venezuela) Erik Silva def. Édgar Cabello	LUX 020; Cancún, Mexico	Feb 11, 2022	? days	
Silva vacated the title.
3	(Costa Rica) Édgar Delgado Jiménez def. Emmanuel Rivero	LUX 035; Monterrey, Mexico	Aug 11, 2023	581 days	1. def. Francesco Patron at LUX 039 on Feb 2, 2024; 2. def. José Alberto Quiñónez at LUX 043 on Jun 28, 2024; 3. def. Alejandro Corrales at LUX 048 on Nov 29, 2024
Delgado vacated the title.
4	(Mexico) Irvin Amaya def. Alejandro Corrales	LUX 056; Monterrey, Mexico	Nov 21, 2025		

=== Men's Bantamweight Championship ===
No.	Name	Event	Date	Reign (total)	Defenses
1	(Mexico) Marco Beltrán def. Erick Ruano Barrera	LUX 004; Mexico City, Mexico	Mar 15, 2019	1455 days	1. def. David Mendoza at LUX 009 on Jul 17, 2020; 2. def. David Mendoza at LUX 014 on Jun 25, 2021; 3. def. Rodolfo Rubio at LUX 023 on Jun 17, 2022; 4. def. José Roura at LUX 029 on Dec 9, 2022
Beltrán vacated the title.
2	(Mexico) José Roura def. Rodolfo Rubio	LUX 033; Puebla, Mexico	Jun 30, 2023	154 days	
3	(Peru) Juan Díaz	LUX 038; Monterrey, Mexico	Dec 1, 2023	693 days	1. def. José Roura at LUX 047 on Nov 1, 2024; 2. def. Uriel Cossio at LUX 050 on Feb 21, 2025
—	(Venezuela) Mauricio Partida def. Rodolfo Rubio	LUX 053; Puebla, Mexico	July 25, 2025	—	
Díaz vacated the title.
4	(Venezuela) Mauricio Partida	—	Oct 24, 2025	218	
Partida vacated the title.

=== Men's Flyweight Championship ===
No.	Name	Event	Date	Reign (total)	Defenses
1	(Brazil) Alessandro Costa def. Luis Solorzano	LUX 010; Monterrey, Mexico	Sept 18, 2020	? days	1. def. Jorge Calvo Martin at LUX 013 on May 7, 2021; 2. def. Kike González at LUX 018 on Nov 5, 2021; 3. def. Carlos Gómez at LUX 027 on Oct 14, 2022
Costa vacated the title.
2	(Costa Rica) Jorge Calvo Martin def. Luis Iván Rodríguez	LUX 031; Mexico City, Mexico	Mar 17, 2023	1068 days	1. def. Luis Solorzano at LUX 034 on Jul 21, 2023; 2. def. Kike González at LUX 041 on Mar 15, 2024; 3. def. Alexandro Bravo at LUX 045 on Aug 16, 2024; 4. def. Kike González at LUX 048 on Nov 29, 2024; 5. def. Luis Iván Rodríguez at LUX 054 on Aug 22, 2025
—	(Mexico) Luis Iván Rodríguez def. Alexandro Bravo	LUX 051; Mexico City, Mexico	Mar 28, 2025	147 days	
3	(Mexico) Paulino Siller	LUX 058; Monterrey, Mexico	Feb 13, 2026		

=== Women's Flyweight Championship ===
No.	Name	Event	Date	Reign (total)	Defenses
1	(Mexico) Victoria Alba def. Daniela Villasmil	LUX 021; Monterrey, Mexico	Mar 18, 2022	245 days	
2	(Mexico) Elí Rodríguez	LUX 028; Monterrey, Mexico	Nov 18, 2022	322 days	
3	(Colombia) Fernanda Muñoz	LUX 036; Guadalajara, Mexico	Oct 6, 2023		
Muñoz vacated the title.

=== Women's Strawweight Championship ===
No.	Name	Event	Date	Reign (total)	Defenses
1	(Mexico) Tania Torres def. Saray Orozco	LUX 015; Tijuana, Mexico	Aug 6, 2021	293 days	
Torres vacated the title.
2	(Mexico) Saray Orozco def. Diana Reyes	LUX 022; Mexico City, Mexico	May 26, 2022	737 days	1. def. Andrea Vázquez at LUX 032 on May 19, 2023
—	(Mexico) Andrea Vázquez def. Yajáira Romo	LUX 028; Monterrey, Mexico	Nov 16, 2022	—	
Orozco vacated the title.
3	(Mexico) Andrea Vázquez def. Jazmín Navarrete	LUX 046; Tampico, Mexico	Oct 11, 2024	391 days	1. def. Diana García at LUX 052 on May 16, 2025
Vázquez vacated the title.
4	(Uruguay) Melany Gómez def. Hannah Ramos	LUX 061; Mexico City, Mexico	May 29, 2026		
—	(Mexico) Karla Pastrana def. Flor Hernández	LUX 064; Monterrey, Mexico	Nov 7, 2026	—	

== List of events ==
#	Event	Date	Venue	Location
64	LUX 064	November 7, 2026	Showcenter Complex	Monterrey, Mexico
63	LUX 063	October 2, 2026	Auditorio Arteaga	Querétaro, Mexico
62	LUX 062	August 14, 2026	Showcenter Complex	Monterrey, Mexico
61	LUX 061	May 29, 2026	Estudios Azteca	Mexico City, Mexico
60	LUX 060	April 24, 2026	CODE Alcalde Dome	Guadalajara, Mexico
59	LUX 059	February 27, 2026	TBA	Mexico City, Mexico
58	LUX 058	February 13, 2026	Showcenter Complex	Monterrey, Mexico
57	LUX 057	December 5, 2025	Gimnasio Marcelino González	Zacatecas, Mexico
56	LUX 056	November 21, 2025	Showcenter Complex	Monterrey, Mexico
55	LUX 055	September 26, 2025	Complejo Deportivo de Artes Marciales	Guadalajara, Mexico
54	LUX 054	August 22, 2025	Showcenter Complex	Monterrey, Mexico
53	LUX 053	July 25, 2025	Teatro Explanada	Puebla, Mexico
52	LUX 052	May 16, 2025	CODE Alcalde Dome	Guadalajara, Mexico
51	LUX 051	March 28, 2025	Centro Citibanamex	Mexico City, Mexico
50	LUX 050	February 21, 2025	Showcenter Complex	Monterrey, Mexico
49	LUX 049	January 31, 2025	Frontón México	Mexico City, Mexico
48	LUX 048	November 29, 2024	Showcenter Complex	Monterrey, Mexico
47	LUX 047	November 1, 2024	Frontón México	Mexico City, Mexico
46	LUX 046	October 11, 2024	Expo Tampico	Tampico, Mexico
45	LUX 045	August 26, 2024	Showcenter Complex	Monterrey, Mexico
44	LUX 044	August 2, 2024	Frontón México	Mexico City, Mexico
43	LUX 043	June 28, 2024	Gimnasio Marcelino González	Zacatecas, Mexico
42	LUX 042	April 26, 2024	CODE Alcalde Dome	Guadalajara, Mexico
41	LUX 041	March 15, 2024	Showcenter Complex	Monterrey, Mexico
40	LUX 040	February 23, 2024	Centro Citibanamex	Mexico City, Mexico
39	LUX 039	February 2, 2024	Teatro Explanada	Puebla, Mexico
38	LUX 038	December 1, 2023	Showcenter Complex	Monterrey, Mexico
37	LUX 037	November 24, 2023	Gimnasio Marcelino González	Zacatecas, Mexico
36	LUX 036	October 6, 2023	CODE Alcalde Dome	Guadalajara, Mexico
35	LUX 035	August 11, 2023	Showcenter Complex	Monterrey, Mexico
34	LUX 034	July 21, 2023	Cancún Center	Cancún, Mexico
33	LUX 033	June 30, 2023	Teatro Explanada	Puebla, Mexico
32	LUX 032	May 19, 2023	CODE Alcalde Dome	Guadalajara, Mexico
31	LUX 031	March 17, 2023	Hipódromo de las Américas	Mexico City, Mexico
30	LUX 030	February 3, 2023	Showcenter Complex	Monterrey, Mexico
29	LUX 029	December 9, 2022	Frontón México	Mexico City, Mexico
28	LUX 028	November 18, 2022	Showcenter Complex	Monterrey, Mexico
27	LUX 027	October 14, 2022	Centro Expositor Puebla	Puebla, Mexico
26	LUX 026	September 2, 2022	Frontón México	Mexico City, Mexico
25	LUX 025	August 13, 2022	Showcenter Complex	Monterrey, Mexico
24	LUX 024	July 15, 2022	Zonkeys Arena	Tijuana, Mexico
23	LUX 023	June 17, 2022	Centro Expositor Puebla	Puebla, Mexico
22	LUX 022	May 26, 2022	Pepsi Center WTC	Mexico City, Mexico
21	LUX 021	March 18, 2022	Showcenter Complex	Monterrey, Mexico
20	LUX 020	February 18, 2022	Estadio Plaza de Toros Cancún	Cancún, Mexico
19	LUX 019	December 10, 2021	Pepsi Center WTC	Mexico City, Mexico
18	LUX 018	November 5, 2021	Forum de Mundo Imperial	Acapulco, Mexico
17	LUX 017	October 15, 2021	Showcenter Complex	Monterrey, Mexico
16	LUX 016	September 17, 2021	Pepsi Center WTC	Mexico City, Mexico
15	LUX 015	August 6, 2021	Showcenter Complex	Monterrey, Mexico
14	LUX 014	June 25, 2021	Showcenter Complex	Monterrey, Mexico
13	LUX 013	May 7, 2021	Showcenter Complex	Monterrey, Mexico
12	LUX 012	March 12, 2021	Showcenter Complex	Monterrey, Mexico
11	LUX 011	November 20, 2020	Showcenter Complex	Monterrey, Mexico
10	LUX 010	September 18, 2020	Showcenter Complex	Monterrey, Mexico
9	LUX 009	July 17, 2020	Showcenter Complex	Monterrey, Mexico
8	LUX 008	February 14, 2020	Frontón México	Mexico City, Mexico
7	LUX 007	November 29, 2019	Showcenter Complex	Monterrey, Mexico
6	LUX 006	August 30, 2019	Showcenter Complex	Monterrey, Mexico
5	LUX 005	July 19, 2019	Frontón México	Mexico City, Mexico
4	LUX 004	March 15, 2019	Pepsi Center WTC	Mexico City, Mexico
3	LUX 003	October 5, 2018	Pepsi Center WTC	Mexico City, Mexico
2	LUX 002	February 17, 2018	Gimnasio Olímpico Juan de la Barrera	Mexico City, Mexico
1	LUX 001	July 21, 2017	Posada Hotel	Tampico, Mexico

=== Event locations ===
- México (total: 64)
  - Monterrey, Nuevo León (25)
  - Mexico City (18)
  - Guadalajara, Jalisco (6)
  - Puebla City, Puebla (5)
  - Zacatecas City, Zacatecas (3)
  - Cancún, Quintana Roo (2)
  - Tampico, Tamaulipas (2)
  - Tijuana, Baja California (1)
  - Acapulco, Guerrero (1)
  - Querétaro, Querétaro (1)
