= 2025 in LUX Fight League =

Information
- First date: January 31, 2025
- Last date: December 5, 2025

Events
- Total events: 9

Fights
- Total fights: 93
- Title fights: 10

The year 2025 was the 9th year in the history of LUX Fight League, a mixed martial arts promotion based in Mexico. In these year, LUX held 9 events.

== Events list ==
#	Event	Date held	Venue	City
1	LUX 049	January 31, 2025	Frontón México	Mexico City, Mexico
2	LUX 050	February 21, 2025	Showcenter Complex	Monterrey, Mexico
3	LUX 051	March 28, 2025	Centro Citibanamex	Mexico City, Mexico
4	LUX 052	May 16, 2025	CODE Alcalde Dome	Guadalajara, Mexico
5	LUX 053	July 25, 2025	Teatro Explanada	Puebla, Mexico
6	LUX 054	August 22, 2025	Showcenter Complex	Monterrey, Mexico
7	LUX 055	September 26, 2025	Complejo Deportivo de Artes Marciales	Guadalajara, Mexico
8	LUX 056	November 21, 2025	Showcenter Complex	Monterrey, Mexico
9	LUX 057	December 5, 2025	Gimnasio Marcelino González	Zacatecas, Mexico

== LUX 049 ==
LUX 049
- Promotion: LUX Fight League
- Date: January 31, 2025
- Venue: Frontón México
- City: Mexico City, Mexico

Event chronology
LUX 048	LUX 049	LUX 050

LUX 049 was a mixed martial arts event held by LUX Fight League on January 31, 2025, at the Frontón México in Mexico City, Mexico.

=== Background ===
A fight for the vacant LUX Welterweight Championship between undefeated Raúl Zaragoza and Carlos Arana headlined the event.

The co-main event featured a featherweight fight between undefeated Damián Fernández and Pedro Rubio.

=== Results ===
Main card
Weight class				Method	Round	Time	Notes
Welterweight	Raúl Zaragoza	def.	Carlos Arana	TKO (punches)	3	1:45	(Note: For the LUX Welterweight Championship)
Featherweight	Damián Fernández	def.	Pedro Rubio	Decision (unanimous)	3	5:00
Welterweight	Luis Márquez	def.	David Briones	TKO (leg kick and punches)	2	1:01
Catchweight	Gerardo Aguillón	def.	Diego Baltazar	TKO (elbows)	1	4:13
Welterweight	Kevin Arreola	def.	Leonel Rojas	TKO (punches)	1	1:43
Bantamweight	Luis González	def.	Omar Ortíz Robles	Submission (rear-naked choke)	2	2:34
Bantamweight	Roberto Zambrano	def.	Yahir Ramírez	Decision (unanimous)	3	5:00
Flyweight	Omar Hernández	def.	Cesar Osorio	Submission (rear-naked choke)	2	2:03
Featherweight	Joel Peña	def.	Hugo Rubio	TKO (punches)	2	2:08
Flyweight	Ricardo Antonio Reyes	def.	Nestor Huerta	Submission (rear-naked choke)	2	4:02
Catchweight	Ariadne Uriega	def.	Jessica Solís	Decision (unanimous)	3	5:00

== LUX 050 ==
LUX 050
- Promotion: LUX Fight League
- Date: February 21, 2025
- Venue: Showcenter Complex
- City: Monterrey, Mexico

Event chronology
LUX 049	LUX 050	LUX 051

LUX 050 was a mixed martial arts event held by LUX Fight League on February 21, 2025, at the Showcenter Complex in Monterrey, Mexico.

=== Background ===
A LUX Bantamweight Championship bout between undefeated champion Juan Díaz and Uriel Cossio headlined the event.

The co-main event featured a bantamweight bout between Santiago Prieto and Emilio Saavedra.

=== Results ===
Main card
Weight class				Method	Round	Time	Notes
Bantamweight	Juan Díaz (c)	def.	Uriel Cossio	Decision (unanimous)	5	5:00	(Note: For the LUX Bantamweight Championship)
Bantamweight	Santiago Prieto	def.	Emilio Saavedra	Decision (unanimous)	3	5:00
Bantamweight	Jaime Londoño	def.	Luis Rey Gallegos	Decision (unanimous)	3	5:00
Flyweight	Kike González	def.	Daniel Nuñez	Decision (unanimous)	3	5:00
Lightweight	Bryan Ulises	def.	Kevin Arreola	TKO (knee and punches)	1	1:11
Bantamweight	Fabian López	def.	Víctor Nuñez	Decision (unanimous)	3	5:00
Bantamweight	Saúl Tijerina	def.	Alberto Pasos	Decision (unanimous)	3	5:00
Welterweight	Martín González	def.	Mario Martínez	TKO (punches)	1	3:46
Flyweight	Franco Varessy	def.	Sebastian Gaibor	Decision (unanimous)	3	5:00

== LUX 051 ==
LUX 051
- Promotion: LUX Fight League
- Date: March 28, 2025
- Venue: Centro Citibanamex
- City: Mexico City, Mexico

Event chronology
LUX 050	LUX 051	LUX 052

LUX 051 was a mixed martial arts event held by LUX Fight League on March 28, 2025, at the Centro Citibanamex in Mexico City, Mexico.

=== Background ===
A fight for the LUX Interim Flyweight Championship between Alexandro Bravo and Luis Iván Rodríguez, both former title challengers in the past, headlined the event.

Hannah Ramos and Sofia Landí were expected to face off in a flyweight fight in the co-main event, but due to complications at the weigh-in, the bout ended up being a catchweight fight.

=== Results ===
Main card
Weight class				Method	Round	Time	Notes
Flyweight	Luis Iván Rodríguez	def.	Alexandro Bravo	Submission (rear-naked choke)	1	3:50	(Note: For the LUX Flyweight Championship)
Catchweight	Hannah Ramos	def.	Sofia Landi	Decision (unanimous)	3	5:00
Flyweight	Mauricio Partida	def.	Fernando Torres	Decision (unanimous)	3	5:00
Bantamweight	André Barquero	def.	Ramfery Gutiérrez	Decision (unanimous)	3	5:00
Bantamweight	Axel Osuna	def.	Francisco Benitez	Submission (armbar)	1	3:54
Women's Strawweight	Julieta Martínez	def.	Pamela González	Decision (unanimous)	3	5:00
Featherweight	Julio Ruíz	def.	Luis Meráz	KO (head kick)	1	3:11
Featherweight	Bryan Geraldo Cruz	def.	Armando Figueroa	Decision (unanimous)	3	5:00
Catchweight	Melany Gómez	def.	Andrea Martínez	Decision (unanimous)	3	5:00
Flyweight	Cesar Escudero	def.	Ricardo Antonio Reyes	Decision (unanimous)	3	5:00

== LUX 052 ==
LUX 052
- Promotion: LUX Fight League
- Date: May 16, 2025
- Venue: CODE Alcalde Dome
- City: Guadalajara, Mexico

Event chronology
LUX 051	LUX 052	LUX 053

LUX 052 was a mixed martial arts event held by LUX Fight League on May 16, 2025, at the CODE Alcalde Dome in Guadalajara, Mexico.

=== Background ===
A fight for the LUX Interim Lightweight Championship between Raúl Zaragoza and former champion Hugo Flores headlined the event.

The co-main event featured a fight for the LUX Women's Strawweight Championship between champion Andrea Vázquez and Dana García.

Victoria Alba and Ivonne Caro were expected to face each other for the second time on May 16, 2025, at LUX 052, which was a rematch of their previous fight at LUX 041. However, the fight was canceled for unknown reasons. The two were rescheduled for LUX 054, to be held on August.

=== Results ===
Main card
Weight class				Method	Round	Time	Notes
Lightweight	Hugo Flores	def.	Raúl Zaragoza	TKO (punches)	2	2:23	(Note: For the LUX Interim Lightweight Championship)
Women's Strawweight	Andrea Vázquez (c)	def.	Dana García	TKO (retirement)	4	5:00	(Note: For the LUX Women's Strawweight Championship)
Featherweight	Irvin Amaya	def.	Isaac Ruelas	KO (punches)	1	1:32
Welterweight	Anuar Aburto	def.	Alexis Miranda	Decision (unanimous)	3	5:00
Featherweight	Alejandro Corrales	def.	Alejandro Cerquera	TKO (head kick and punches)	1	1:19
Lightweight	Bryan Ulises	def.	Ramiro Saracho	KO (knee)	1	0:45
Catchweight	Sergio Barajas	def.	Marcelo Waigandt	Submission (rear-naked choke)	1	3:24
Women's Strawweight	Ariadne Uriega	def.	Gabriela Aviña	Decision (unanimous)	3	5:00
Catchweight	Rosario Arana	def.	Ivonne Caro	Submission (armbar)	2	3:36
Flyweight	Alexis León	def.	Leman López	Decision (unanimous)	3	5:00

== LUX 053 ==
LUX 053
- Promotion: LUX Fight League
- Date: July 25, 2025
- Venue: Teatro Explanada
- City: Puebla, Mexico

Event chronology
LUX 052	LUX 053	LUX 054

LUX 053 was a mixed martial arts event held by LUX Fight League on July 25, 2025, at the Teatro Explanada in Puebla, Mexico.

=== Background ===
A fight for the LUX Interim Bantamweight Championship between former title challenger Rodolfo Rubio and undefeated Mauricio Partida headlined the event.

=== Results ===
Main card
Weight class				Method	Round	Time	Notes
Bantamweight	Mauricio Partida	def.	Rodolfo Rubio	Decision (unanimous)	5	5:00	(Note: For the LUX Interim Bantamweight Championship)
Bantamweight	Damian Fernández	def.	Kevin Morales	TKO (front kick to the body and punches)	2	3:47
Flyweight	Ricardo Hussein	def.	Yahir Ramírez	Decision (unanimous)	3	5:00
Bantamweight	Cesar Vázquez	def.	Daniel Lugo	KO (head kick)	1	2:07
Lightweight	Pedro Rubio	def.	Jonas Ortega	Decision (unanimous)	3	5:00
Flyweight	Anthony Ramírez	def.	Ulises Cenicero	Submission (arm-triangle choke)	2	4:59
Bantamweight	Luis González	def.	Ricardo Ramírez	Submission (rear-naked choke)	2	4:20
Flyweight	Luis Cabrera	def.	Samuel Cortés	Decision (unanimous)	3	5:00
Bantamweight	Salvador Cuevas	def.	Omar Hernández	Submission (rear-naked choke)	1	1:36
Flyweight	Jesús Osorno	def.	Conrado Flores	Submission (rear-naked choke)	2	2:56
Featherweight	Abraham Nava	def.	Felipe Duarte	Submission (rear-naked choke)	1	2:10

== LUX 054 ==
LUX 054
- Promotion: LUX Fight League
- Date: August 22, 2025
- Venue: Showcenter Complex
- City: Monterrey, Mexico

Event chronology
LUX 053	LUX 054	LUX 055

LUX 054 was a mixed martial arts event held by LUX Fight League on August 22, 2025, at the Showcenter Complex in Monterrey, Mexico.

=== Background ===
A fight for the LUX Flyweight Championship between champion Jorge Calvo Martin and Luis Iván Rodríguez headlined the event. It was a rematch of their fight at LUX 031, which ended with a victory for Calvo that made him the division champion. Rodríguez, meanwhile, won the interim championship at LUX 051 after defeating Alexandro Bravo in the first round.

The co-main event featured a flyweight fight between Paulino Siller and Kike González.

A rematch between Victoria Alba and Ivonne Caro was scheduled to take place at this event. However, Caro was removed from the card days before, and her place was taken by Fernanda Díaz.

=== Results ===
Main card
Weight class				Method	Round	Time	Notes
Flyweight	Jorge Calvo Martin (c)	def.	Luis Iván Rodríguez (c)	Decision (unanimous)	5	5:00	(Note: For the LUX Flyweight Championship)
Flyweight	Paulino Siller	def.	Kike González	Decision (unanimous)	3	5:00
Featherweight	Aarón Cañarte	def.	Jefferson Vargas	Decision (unanimous)	3	5:00
Bantamweight	César Vázquez	def.	Alan Castro	TKO (punches)	1	3:05
Flyweight	Denylson Martínez	def.	Franco Varessy	Decision (unanimous)	3	5:00
Flyweight	Gerardo Sánchez	def.	Zaid Varela	Decision (unanimous)	3	5:00
Women's Strawweight	Melany Gómez	def.	Karen Martínez	Decision (unanimous)	3	5:00
Catchweight	Isaac Samayoa	def.	David Mendoza	Decision (unanimous)	3	5:00
Bantamweight	Luis Elías	def.	Eliel Mota	Decision (unanimous)	3	5:00
Women's Flyweight	Victoria Alba	def.	Fernanda Díaz	Submission (rear-naked choke)	1	4:43

== LUX 055 ==
LUX 055
- Promotion: LUX Fight League
- Date: September 26, 2025
- Venue: Centro Deportivo de Artes Marciales
- City: Guadalajara, Mexico

Event chronology
LUX 054	LUX 055	LUX 056

LUX 055 was a mixed martial arts event held by LUX Fight League on September 26, 2025, at the CODE Alcalde Dome in Guadalajara, Mexico.

=== Background ===
Due to Raúl Zaragoza vacating the LUX Welterweight Championship for unknown reasons, a fight between Antonio Suárez and Anuar Aburto was scheduled for the title, which headlined the event.

The co-main event featured a featherweight fight between Julio Ruíz and Walter Zamora.

=== Results ===
Main card
Weight class				Method	Round	Time	Notes
Welterweight	Antonio Suárez	def.	Anuar Aburto	KO (punches)	3	2:08	(Note: For the LUX Welterweight Championship)
Featherweight	Julio Ruíz	def.	Walter Zamora	Decision (unanimous)	3	5:00
Flyweight	Axel Osuna	def.	Alexandro Bravo	Decision (unanimous)	3	5:00
Bantamweight	Sergio Barajas	def.	Ramfery Gutiérrez	Decision (unanimous)	3	5:00
Women's Flyweight	Fernanda Larios	def.	Sofía Landi	Decision (unanimous)	3	5:00
Women's Strawweight	Ailed Zubieta	def.	Ariadne Uriega	Submission (armbar)	2	2:25
Welterweight	Martín González	def.	Sinar Corzo	TKO (punches)	1	1:22
Bantamweight	Omar Ortíz	def.	Luis Gerardo Aguillón	Decision (unanimous)	3	5:00
Flyweight	Jorge López	def.	Leman López	Submission (rear-naked choke)	2	4:06
Bantamweight	Mauricio Orozco	def.	Rodrigo Ponce	Submission (rear-naked choke)	1	2:43
Lightweight	Ricardo Rea	def.	Juan Carlos Martínez	Submission (rear-naked choke)	1	1:20

== LUX 056 ==
LUX 056
- Promotion: LUX Fight League
- Date: November 21, 2025
- Venue: Showcenter Complex
- City: Monterrey, Mexico

Event chronology
LUX 055	LUX 056	LUX 057

LUX 056 was a mixed martial arts event held by LUX Fight League on November 21, 2025, at the Showcenter Complex in Monterrey, Mexico.

=== Background ===
In February 2025, Édgar Delgado Jiménez vacated his LUX Featherweight Championship by signing with Oktagon MMA. As a result, a fight between Irvin Amaya and Alejandro Corrales for the title was scheduled, which headlined this event.

The co-main event featured a bantamweight fight between César Vázquez and Fabián López.

The fight between Victoria Alba and Ivonne Caro, which had been canceled twice for different reasons, also took place.

=== Results ===
Main card
Weight class				Method	Round	Time	Notes
Featherweight	Irvin Amaya	def.	Alejandro Corrales	Decision (unanimous)	5	5:00	(Note: For the LUX Featherweight Championship)
Bantamweight	Fabián López	def.	César Vázquez	TKO (elbows and punches)	2	0:38
Bantamweight	Damián Fernández	def.	André Barquero	Decision (unanimous)	3	5:00
Bantamweight	Brandon González	def.	Emilio Saavedra	Submission (rear-naked choke)	3	3:36
Women's Flyweight	Victoria Alba	def.	Ivonne Caro	Decision (unanimous)	3	5:00
Catchweight	Silvestre Sánchez	def.	David Hernández	TKO (elbows and punches)	2	2:25
Bantamweight	Santiago Prieto	def.	Edgar García Cabello	TKO (elbows and punches)	1	1:22
Flyweight	Jair Landa	def.	Omar Hernández	Decision (unanimous)	3	5:00
Bantamweight	Joel Peña	def.	Néstor Huerta	Decision (unanimous)	3	5:00
Flyweight	Fernando Torres	def.	Alan Castro	Technical Submission (rear-naked choke)	2	4:00
Flyweight	Cristian García	def.	José Novelo	Submission (rear-naked choke)	3	2:54

== LUX 057 ==
LUX 057
- Promotion: LUX Fight League
- Date: December 5, 2025
- Venue: Gimnasio Marcelino González
- City: Zacatecas, Mexico

Event chronology
LUX 056	LUX 057	LUX 058

LUX 057 was a mixed martial arts event held by LUX Fight League on December 5, 2025, at the Gimnasio Marcelino González in Zacatecas, Mexico.

=== Background ===
A fight between Brahyam Zurcher and Dumar Roa was supposed to be a featherweight bout, but due to complications at the weigh-in, it was changed to a catchweight bout.

The co-main event featured a welterweight bout between Alejandro Sánchez and Martín González.

=== Results ===
Main card
Weight class				Method	Round	Time	Notes
Catchweight	Brahyam Zurcher	def.	Dumar Roa	Submission (rear-naked choke)	1	3:53	(Note: For the LUX Welterweight Championship)
Welterweight	Martín González	def.	Alejandro Sánchez	Decision (unanimous)	3	5:00
Catchweight	Víctor Nuñez	def.	Hugo Torres	KO (punches)	1	3:57
Bantamweight	Omar Ortíz Robles	def.	Ricardo Messino	Decision (unanimous)	3	5:00
Bantamweight	Gabriel Urbino	def.	Carlos Gómez	Submission (rear-naked choke)	1	3:49
Catchweight	Davíd Mendoza	def.	Marcos Covarrubias	Submission (rear-naked choke)	1	3:13
Lightweight	Daniel Reyes	def.	Jonathan Esquivel	Decision (split)	3	5:00
Lightweight	Juan Carlos Martínez	def.	José Manuel Lavenant	TKO (knee and punches)	2	1:49
Catchweight	Eliel Mota	def.	Rafael García	Decision (unanimous)	3	5:00
Flyweight	Jesús Osorno	def.	Gabriel Gómez	Submission (rear-naked choke)	1	2:10
