= 2023 in LUX Fight League =

Information
- First date: February 3, 2023
- Last date: December 1, 2023

Events
- Total events: 9

Fights
- Total fights: 98
- Title fights: 9

The year 2023 was the 7th year in the history of LUX Fight League, a mixed martial arts promotion based in Mexico. In these year, LUX held 9 events.

== Events list ==
#	Event	Date held	Venue	City
1	LUX 030	February 3, 2023	Showcenter Complex	Monterrey, Mexico
2	LUX 031	March 17, 2023	Hipódromo de las Américas	Mexico City, Mexico
3	LUX 032	May 19, 2023	CODE Alcalde Dome	Guadalajara, Mexico
4	LUX 033	June 30, 2023	Teatro Explanada	Puebla, Mexico
5	LUX 034	July 21, 2023	Cancún Center	Cancún, Mexico
6	LUX 035	August 11, 2023	Showcenter Complex	Monterrey, Mexico
7	LUX 036	October 6, 2023	CODE Alcalde Dome	Guadalajara, Mexico
8	LUX 037	November 24, 2023	Gimnasio Marcelino González	Zacatecas, Mexico
9	LUX 038	December 1, 2023	Showcenter Complex	Monterrey, Mexico

== LUX 030 ==
LUX 030
- Promotion: LUX Fight League
- Date: February 3, 2023
- Venue: Showcenter Complex
- City: Monterrey, Mexico

Event chronology
LUX 029	LUX 030	LUX 031

LUX 030 was a mixed martial arts event held by LUX Fight League on February 3, 2023, at the Showcenter Complex in Monterrey, Mexico.

=== Background ===
A fight for the LUX Middleweight Championship between champion Iván Valenzuela and Nayib López, the latter returning to LUX since his fight at LUX 002.

The co-main event featured a featherweight fight between Emmanuel Rivero and the undefeated Francesco Patrón.

=== Results ===
Main card
Weight class				Method	Round	Time	Notes
Middleweight	Nayib López	def.	Iván Valenzuela (c)	TKO (punches)	4	3:44	(Note: For the LUX Middleweight Championship)
Featherweight	Emmanuel Rivero	def.	Francesco Patrón	KO (punch)	3	1:38
Bantamweight	André Barquero	def.	César Vázquez	Submission (rear-naked choke)	2	2:15
Welterweight	Antonio Suárez	def.	Alan Domínguez	Decisioun (split)	3	5:00
Bantamweight	Juan Díaz	def.	Irvin Amaya	Decision (unanimous)	3	5:00
Bantamweight	Luis Rey Gallegos	def.	Ramón Cardozo	Decision (unanimous)	3	5:00
Featherweight	Alejandro Corrales	def.	Jefferson Vargas	Decision (unanimous)	3	5:00
Bantamweight	Damián Fernández	def.	Carlos Márquez	KO (punch)	2	4:17
Bantamweight	Eduardo García	def.	Ricardo Hurtado	TKO (punches)	1	3:14
Women's Strawweight	Susset Gómez	def.	Sherlyn Sánchez	Decision (unanimous)	3	5:00

== LUX 031 ==
LUX 031
- Promotion: LUX Fight League
- Date: March 17, 2023
- Venue: Hipódromo de las Américas
- City: Mexico City, Mexico

Event chronology
LUX 030	LUX 031	LUX 032

LUX 031 was a mixed martial arts event held by LUX Fight League on March 17, 2023, at the Hipódromo de las Américas in Mexico City, Mexico.

=== Background ===
Following Alessandro Costa's departure to sign with UFC, a fight was scheduled between Jorge Calvo Martin and Luis Iván Rodríguez for the vacant LUX Flyweight Championship.

The co-main event featured a bantamweight bout between Luis Guerrero and Juan Pablo Mendoza.

=== Results ===
Main card
Weight class				Method	Round	Time	Notes
Flyweight	Jorge Calvo Martin	def.	Luis Iván Rodríguez	Submission (rear-naked choke)	1	2:17	(Note: For the LUX Flyweight Championship)
Bantamweight	Luis Guerrero	def.	Juan Pablo Mendoza	Decision (split)	3	5:00
Bantamweight	David Mendoza	def.	Antonio Barajas	Decision (unanimous)	3	5:00
Flyweight	Cesar Vázquez Jr.	def.	Paulino Siller	Submission (triangle choke)	2	1:42
Bantamweight	Edgar García Cabello	def.	Isaac Samayoa	Decision (split)	3	5:00
Women's Flyweight	Fernanda Muñoz	def.	Daniela Villasmil	Decision (split)	3	5:00
Featherweight	Carlos Rivera	def.	Walter Reyes	Decision (unanimous)	3	5:00
Women's Strawweight	Dana García	def.	Hannah Ramos	Submission (guillotine choke)	2	2:00
Bantamweight	Alberto García	def.	Kevin Morales	Submission (heel hook)	1	1:00
Welterweight	Axel Guerra	def.	Antonio Arellano	Decision (unanimous)	3	5:00
Flyweight	Abdi Iniestra	def.	David Knutsen	Decision (unanimous)	3	5:00
Women's Strawweight	Solangel Vera	def.	Katia Torres	Submission (rear-naked choke)	1	3:17

== LUX 032 ==
LUX 032
- Promotion: LUX Fight League
- Date: May 19, 2023
- Venue: CODE Alcalde Dome
- City: Guadalajara, Mexico

Event chronology
LUX 031	LUX 032	LUX 033

LUX 032 was a mixed martial arts event held by LUX Fight League on May 19, 2023, at the CODE Alcalde Dome in Guadalajara, Mexico.

=== Background ===
The LUX Women's Strawweight Championship unification bout between champion Saray Orozco and interim champion Andrea Vázquez headlined the event.

Meanwhile, the co-main event featured a featherweight bout between Édgar Delgado Jiménez and Victor Moreno.

=== Results ===
Main card
Weight class				Method	Round	Time	Notes
Women's Strawweight	Saray Orozco (c)	def.	Andrea Vázquez (c)	Decision (unanimous)	5	5:00	(Note: For the LUX Women's Strawweight Championship)
Featherweight	Édgar Delgado Jiménez	def.	Víctor Moreno	Decision (unanimous)	3	5:00
Bantamweight	Ronaldo Rodríguez	def.	Angel Rodríguez	TKO (punches)	3	1:00
Bantamweight	Mauricio Partida	def.	Mauricio Nievas	KO (punches)	1	1:22
Welterweight	Anuar Aburto	def.	Luis Márquez	Decision (unanimous)	3	5:00
Catchweight	Luis Solorzano	def.	Alejandro Villarreal	Decision (split)	3	5:00
Bantamweight	Uriel Cossio	def.	Jaime Londoño	Decision (unanimous)	3	5:00
Catchweight	Carlos Arana	def.	Erick Garibay	Decision (unanimous)	3	5:00
Welterweight	Josue Bojorge	def.	Carlos Camargo	Decision (unanimous)	3	5:00
Catchweight	Leticia Baltazar	def.	Itzel Padilla	Decision (unanimous)	3	5:00
Catchweight	José Sándoval	def.	Erick Montelongo	Decision (split)	3	5:00

== LUX 033 ==
LUX 033
- Promotion: LUX Fight League
- Date: June 30, 2023
- Venue: Teatro Explanada
- City: Puebla, Mexico

Event chronology
LUX 032	LUX 033	LUX 034

LUX 033 was a mixed martial arts event held by LUX Fight League on June 30, 2023, at the Teatro Explanada in Puebla, Mexico.

=== Background ===
A LUX Bantamweight Championship bout for the vacant title between José Roura and Rodolfo Rubio, former title challengers in past events, headlined the event.

The co-main event featured a featherweight bout between Francesco Patrón and Luis Meraz.

=== Results ===
Main card
Weight class				Method	Round	Time	Notes
Bantamweight	José Roura	def.	Rodolfo Rubio	Decision (unanimous)	5	5:00	(Note: For the LUX Bantamweight Championship)
Featherweight	Francesco Patrón	def.	Luis Meraz	Decision (unanimous)	3	5:00
Flyweight	Alexandro Bravo	def.	Jesús Siller	Decision (unanimous)	3	5:00
Women's Flyweight	Fernanda Muñoz	def.	Luisa Fernanda Cifuentes	Decision (unanimous)	3	5:00
Welterweight	Raúl Zaragoza	def.	Jesús Wong	KO (punch)	2	2:50
Flyweight	Luis Cabrera	def.	Fernando Saavedra	KO (punch)	2	2:45
Bantamweight	Fredy Villegas	def.	Jorge Manzano	Decision (unanimous)	3	5:00
Bantamweight	Guillermo Vidañez	def.	Salvador Cuevas	TKO (head kick and punches)	1	4:54
Flyweight	Ricardo Hussein	def.	Iván Rodríguez	Decision (unanimous)	3	5:00
Bantamweight	Liborio López	def.	Alejandro Guerrero	Submission (rear-naked choke)	2	2:38
Flyweight	Samuel Cortés	def.	Ulises Ceniceros	Submission (rear-naked choke)	2	2:03

== LUX 034 ==
LUX 034
- Promotion: LUX Fight League
- Date: July 21, 2023
- Venue: Cancún Center
- City: Cancún, Mexico

Event chronology
LUX 033	LUX 034	LUX 035

LUX 034 was a mixed martial arts event held by LUX Fight League on July 21, 2023, at the Cancún Center in Cancún, Mexico.

=== Background ===
A fight for the LUX Flyweight Championship between champion Jorge Calvo and former title challenger Luis Solorzano was scheduled for this event.

The co-main event featured a bantamweight fight between Juan Díaz and Luis Guerrero.

=== Results ===
Main card
Weight class				Method	Round	Time	Notes
Flyweight	Jorge Calvo Martin (c)	def.	Luis Solorzano	Submission (rear-naked choke)	2	4:55	(Note: For the LUX Flyweight Championship)
Bantamweight	Juan Díaz	def.	Luis Guerrero	Submission (rear-naked choke)	1	1:49
Flyweight	Emilio Cuéllar	def.	David Pérez	TKO (knee and punches)	3	3:04
Welterweight	Alan Domínguez	def.	Martín González	Decision (unanimous)	3	5:00
Featherweight	Alejandro Corrales	def.	Walter Reyes	TKO (punches)	1	4:33
Women's Strawweight	Hannah Ramos	def.	Mon Batiz	Submission (armbar)	1	4:18
Bantamweight	Guillermo Torres	def.	Alberto García	TKO (punches)	2	1:00
Lightweight	Angel Rodríguez	def.	Jesús Martínez	Decision (unanimous)	3	5:00
Featherweight	Jonas Ortega	def.	Efren Hernández	Decision (unanimous)	3	5:00
Lightweight	Bryan Ulises	def.	Enrique Lara	TKO (punches)	3	2:08
Bantamweight	Juan Zúñiga	def.	Isaac Amaya	Submission (rear-naked choke)	1	1:00

== LUX 035 ==
LUX 035
- Promotion: LUX Fight League
- Date: August 11, 2023
- Venue: Showcenter Complex
- City: Monterrey, Mexico

Event chronology
LUX 034	LUX 035	LUX 036

LUX 035 was a mixed martial arts event held by LUX Fight League on August 11, 2023, at the Showcenter Complex in Monterrey, Mexico.

=== Background ===
After Erik Silva vacated the LUX Featherweight Championship to sign with UFC, the promotion announced a fight between Édgar Delgado Jiménez and Emmanuel Rivero for the vacant title, which headlined this event.

The co-main event featured a bantamweight bout between André Barquero and Irvin Amaya.

=== Results ===
Main card
Weight class				Method	Round	Time	Notes
Bantamweight	Édgar Delgado Jiménez	def.	Emmanuel Rivero	TKO (punches)	3	4:39	(Note: For the LUX Featherweight Championship)
Bantamweight	André Barquero	def.	Irvin Amaya	Submission (rear-naked choke)	1	4:07
Bantamweight	Emilio Saavedra	def.	Luis Rey Gallegos	Decision (unanimous)	3	5:00
Catchweight	Hugo Flores	def.	Leonel Rojas	Decision (unanimous)	3	5:00
Featherweight	Isaac Samayoa	def.	Alejandro Cerquera	Decision (unanimous)	3	5:00
Catchweight	Solangel Vera	def.	Jahaziel Carrillo	Submission (armbar)	1	2:14
Bantamweight	Damián Fernández	def.	Fabián López	Decision (unanimous)	3	5:00
Catchweight	Jander Martínez	def.	Jesús Pantoja	TKO (punches)	1	4:28
Bantamweight	Andrés Leal	def.	Antonio Barajas	Submission (rear-naked choke)	3	2:47
Lightweight	Arturo Hernández	def.	Alejandro Quero	TKO (elbows)	2	4:38
Featherweight	Héctor Pedroza	def.	Jairo González	Decision (unanimous)	3	5:00

== LUX 036 ==
LUX 036
- Promotion: LUX Fight League
- Date: October 6, 2023
- Venue: CODE Alcalde Dome
- City: Guadalajara, Mexico

Event chronology
LUX 035	LUX 036	LUX 037

LUX 036 was a mixed martial arts event held by LUX Fight League on October 6, 2023, at the CODE Alcalde Dome in Guadalajara, Mexico.

=== Background ===
A rematch between Alan Domínguez and Antonio Suárez for the inaugural LUX Welterweight Championship was announced as the main event of the show. The two had already faced each other at LUX 030 in February 2023, which ended in victory for Suárez.

For the co-main event, a fight for the LUX Women's Flyweight Championship between champion Eli Rodríguez and Fernanda Muñoz was scheduled.

=== Results ===
Main card
Weight class				Method	Round	Time	Notes
Welterweight	Alan Domínguez	def.	Antonio Suárez	Decision (unanimous)	5	5:00	(Note: For the LUX Welterweight Championship)
Women's Flyweight	Fernanda Muñoz	def.	Eli Rodríguez (c)	Decision (unanimous)	5	5:00	(Note: For the LUX Women's Flyweight Championship)
Welterweight	Anuar Aburto	def.	Ramón Grano	TKO (punches)	2	3:23
Catchweight	Brahyam Zurcher	def.	Carlos Tenorio	TKO (knees)	1	1:29
Bantamweight	Guillermo Torres	def.	Víctor Moreno	TKO (punches)	1	3:55
Bantamweight	Mauricio Partida	def.	Uriel Cossio	Decision (split)	3	5:00
Catchweight	Andrea Vázquez	def.	Ana Ramírez	KO (knee to the body)	2	2:45
Welterweight	Marco Pardo	def.	Josue Bojorge	KO (punch)	1	1:49
Welterweight	Carlos Camargo	def.	Lautaro Ayala	Submission (triangle choke)	1	1:41
Bantamweight	Alejandro Villarreal	def.	Kevin Morales	Submission (toe hold)	2	4:49
Flyweight	José Sándoval	def.	Alexis Aguilar	Submission (rear-naked choke)	2	3:55
Women's Flyweight	Monica Alarcón	def.	Alma Ávila	Decision (unanimous)	3	5:00

== LUX 037 ==
LUX 037
- Promotion: LUX Fight League
- Date: November 24, 2023
- Venue: Gimnasio Marcelino González
- City: Zacatecas, Mexico

Event chronology
LUX 036	LUX 037	LUX 038

LUX 037 was a mixed martial arts event held by LUX Fight League on November 24, 2023, at the Gimnasio Marcelino González in Zacatecas, Mexico.

=== Background ===
A bantamweight bout between newcomer José Alberto Quiñónez and Jonas Ortega headlined the event.

=== Results ===
Main card
Weight class				Method	Round	Time	Notes
Bantamweight	José Alberto Quiñónez	def.	Jonas Ortega	Decision (unanimous)	3	5:00
Flyweight	Luis Iván Rodríguez	def.	Victor Nuñez	Decision (unanimous)	3	5:00
Featherweight	Alejandro Corrales	def.	Carlos Rivera	Decision (unanimous)	3	5:00
Bantamweight	Mauricio Nievas	def.	César Vázquez	Decision (unanimous)	3	5:00
Catchweight	Leonel Rojas	def.	Guillermo dos Santos	TKO (punches)	2	2:17
Flyweight	Luis Quintana	def.	Luis Cabrera	Decision (unanimous)	3	5:00
Featherweight	Jefferson Vargas	def.	Eduardo Meneses	Submission (rear-naked choke)	2	4:07
Flyweight	Abdi Iniestra	def.	Cesar Osorio	Submission (armbar)	1	4:04
Lightweight	Pedro Rubio	def.	Sergio Galindo	TKO (punches)	1	0:45
Women's Strawweight	Andrea Martínez	def.	Katia Torres	Submission (arm-naked choke)	1	2:16

== LUX 038 ==
LUX 038
- Promotion: LUX Fight League
- Date: December 1, 2023
- Venue: Showcenter Complex
- City: Monterrey, Mexico

Event chronology
LUX 037	LUX 038	LUX 039

LUX 038 was a mixed martial arts event held by LUX Fight League on December 1, 2023, at the Showcenter Complex in Monterrey, Mexico.

=== Background ===
A fight for the LUX Bantamweight Championship between champion José Roura and Juan Díaz headlined the event.

=== Results ===
Main card
Weight class				Method	Round	Time	Notes
Bantamweight	Juan Díaz	def.	José Roura (c)	Decision (unanimous)	5	5:00	(Note: For the LUX Bantamweight Championship)
Flyweight	Kike González	def.	Emilio Cuéllar	KO (punch)	1	2:40
Flyweight	Alexandro Bravo	def.	David Pérez	Submission (rear-naked choke)	2	3:51
Women's Strawweight	Hannah Ramos	def.	Solangel Vera	Decision (unanimous)	3	5:00
Bantamweight	Santiago Prieto	def.	Irvin Amaya	Submission (rear-naked choke)	2	3:57
Lightweight	Luis Márquez	def.	Hugo Flores	KO (punch)	1	2:58
Featherweight	Emmanuel Rivero	def.	Edgar García Cabello	Decision (unanimous)	3	5:00
Bantamweight	Guillermo Vidañez	def.	Eliu Trujillo	TKO (punches)	2	1:34
Flyweight	Uriel Uribe	def.	Samuel Cortés	Decision (unanimous)	3	5:00
Featherweight	Daniel Luna	def.	Erick Gaitán	Submission (rear-naked choke)	1	4:10
