= 2019 in LUX Fight League =

Information
- First date: March 15, 2019
- Last date: November 29, 2019

Events
- Total events: 4

Fights
- Total fights: 54
- Title fights: 4

The year 2019 was the third year in the history of LUX Fight League, a mixed martial arts promotion based in Mexico. In these year, LUX held 4 events.

== Events list ==
| # | Event | Date held | Venue | City |
|---|---|---|---|---|
| 1 | LUX 004 | March 15, 2019 | Pepsi Center WTC | Mexico City, Mexico |
| 2 | LUX 005 | July 19, 2019 | Frontón México | Mexico City, Mexico |
| 3 | LUX 006 | August 30, 2019 | Showcenter Complex | Monterrey, Mexico |
| 4 | LUX 007 | November 29, 2019 | Showcenter Complex | Monterrey, Mexico |

== LUX 004 ==
LUX 004
- Promotion: LUX Fight League
- Date: March 15, 2019
- Venue: Pepsi Center WTC
- City: Mexico City, Mexico

Event chronology
| LUX 003 | LUX 004 | LUX 005 |

LUX 004 was a mixed martial arts event held by LUX Fight League on March 15, 2019, at the Pepsi Center WTC in Mexico City, Mexico.

=== Background ===
LUX announced that, for its fourth event, the inaugural bantamweight and lightweight champions would be crowned. The two title fights were Marco Beltrán vs. Erick Ruano Barrera for the bantamweight championship, and Ignacio Bahamondes vs. Hugo Flores for the lightweight championship.

The event also featured former UFC fighter Rony Jason, who faced his Brazilian compatriot Diego Lopes in a featherweight bout.

As in the previous event, there was another women's strawweight bout, this time between the experienced Saray Orozco and debutant Laura Zamora.

=== Results ===
Main card
| Weight class | | | | Method | Round | Time | Notes |
|---|---|---|---|---|---|---|---|
| Bantamweight | Marco Beltrán | def. | Erick Ruano Barrera | TKO (punches) | 4 | 4:23 | (Note: For the LUX Bantamweight Championship) |
| Bantamweight | Ignacio Bahamondes | def. | Hugo Flores | Decision (unanimous) | 5 | 5:00 | (Note: For the LUX Lightweight Championship) |
| Catchweight | Sergio Cossio | def. | Marcos Bernstain | Submission (guillotine choke) | 1 | 2:04 |
| Featherweight | Diego Lopes | def. | Rony Jason | Decision (unanimous) | 3 | 5:00 |
| Flyweight | Jaime Granados | def. | Alan Diosdado | Decision (unanimous) | 3 | 5:00 |
| Featherweight | David Mendoza | def. | Diego Baltazar | KO (ground & pound) | 1 | 3:26 |
| Featherweight | Miguel Villegas | def. | Aaron Garza | Submission (heel hook) | 1 | 0:51 |
| Catchweight | Saray Orozco | def. | Laura Zamora | Decision (unanimous) | 3 | 5:00 |
| Welterweight | Iván Valenzuela | def. | Juan Carlos Díaz | KO (ground & pound) | 1 | 2:45 |
| Lightweight | Junior Melo | def. | Ricardo Díaz | TKO (punches) | 1 | 1:45 |
| Catchweight | Alex González | def. | Isaac Samayoa | TKO (punches) | 2 | 3:45 |
| Featherweight | Carlos Márquez | def. | Nikolas Vargas | Decision (split) | 3 | 5:00 |
| Featherweight | Luis Rey Gallegos | def. | Álvaro Torres | Submission (von flue choke) | 2 | 2:08 |
| Featherweight | César Vázquez | def. | David Bento | TKO (punches) | 3 | 3:13 |

== LUX 005 ==
LUX 005
- Promotion: LUX Fight League
- Date: July 19, 2019
- Venue: Frontón México
- City: Mexico City, Mexico

Event chronology
| LUX 004 | LUX 005 | LUX 006 |

LUX 005 was a mixed martial arts event held by LUX Fight League on July 19, 2019, at the Frontón México in Mexico City, Mexico.

=== Background ===
A lightweight bout between Rony Jason and Edgar Díaz was announced as the main event, marking Jason's return after a year and a half away from competition in the cage.

=== Results ===
Main card
| Weight class | | | | Method | Round | Time | Notes |
|---|---|---|---|---|---|---|---|
| Lightweight | Rony Jason | def. | Edgar Díaz | TKO (punches) | 1 | 2:05 |
| Lightweight | Erivan Pereira | def. | José Ruelas Soto | Submission (rear-naked choke) | 2 | 4:35 |
| Flyweight | Jaime Granados | def. | Luis Solorzano | Decision (split) | 3 | 5:00 |
| Bantamweight | Alessandro Costa | def. | Alex González | Submission (armbar) | 1 | 1:09 |
| Women's Flyweight | Judith Bolaños | def. | Monik Romero | Decision (split) | 3 | 5:00 |
| Lightweight | Miguel Arizmendi | def. | Fabian Quintanar | Submission (heel hook) | 2 | 0:58 |
| Lightweight | Jordan Beltrán | def. | Aldo Corona | Submission (armbar) | 1 | 1:18 |
| Bantamweight | Marcos Bernstain | def. | Giovani López | Decision (unanimous) | 3 | 5:00 |
| Catchweight | Uriel Cossio | def. | Emmanuel Palafox Jr. | TKO (knees and punches) | 2 | 3:08 |
| Bantamweight | Carlos Márquez | def. | Jordi Maya | Decision (split) | 3 | 5:00 |
| Featherweight | Francesco Patrón | def. | Erick Samuel Coyoc | Submission (armbar) | 1 | 1:30 |
| Lightweight | Juan Camilo Caicedo | def. | Pablo Lemus | Decision (unanimous) | 3 | 5:00 |

== LUX 006 ==
LUX 006
- Promotion: LUX Fight League
- Date: August 30, 2019
- Venue: Showcenter Complex
- City: Monterrey, Mexico

Event chronology
| LUX 005 | LUX 006 | LUX 007 |

LUX 006 was a mixed martial arts event held by LUX Fight League on August 30, 2019, at the Showcenter Complex in Monterrey, Mexico.

=== Background ===
A fight for the LUX Featherweight Championship between Diego Lopes and Alejandro Solano Rodríguez was announced as the main event.

For the fourth consecutive time, the co-main event featured lightweight fighters, this time between Ricardo Arreola and Sergio Cossio.

=== Results ===
Main card
| Weight class | | | | Method | Round | Time | Notes |
|---|---|---|---|---|---|---|---|
| Featherweight | Diego Lopes | def. | Alejandro Solano Rodríguez | Decision (unanimous) | 5 | 5:00 | (Note: For the LUX Featherweight Championship) |
| Lightweight | Sergio Cossio | def. | Ricardo Arreola | TKO (punches) | 3 | 4:05 |
| Lightweight | David Mendoza | def. | Mario Tena | Submission (rear-naked choke) | 2 | 2:39 |
| Lightweight | Antonio Suárez | def. | Luis Medrano | Decision (unanimous) | 3 | 5:00 |
| Catchweight | Iván Valenzuela | def. | Thales Adriel | Submission (guillotine choke) | 1 | 4:11 |
| Flyweight | Rubén Lozano | def. | Axel Torres | KO (punches) | 1 | 3:44 |
| Women's Strawweight | Laura Zamora | def. | Ana Laura Ramírez | TKO (punches) | 1 | 2:31 |
| Featherweight | Miguel Villegas | def. | Oziel Rodríguez | Submission (rear-naked choke) | 1 | 2:07 |
| Featherweight | Luis Guerrero | def. | Fabian Galván | KO (head kick) | 3 | 3:45 |
| Flyweight | Jorge Calvo Martin | def. | Erick Rodríguez | Submission (rear-naked choke) | 1 | 2:04 |
| Bantamweight | Luis Rey Gallegos | def. | Roberto Villalobos | Decision (unanimous) | 3 | 5:00 |
| Bantamweight | Ramiro Jiménez | def. | Uriel Cossio | Decision (unanimous) | 3 | 5:00 |
| Lightweight | Alan Domínguez | def. | Aaron Garza | Decision (split) | 3 | 5:00 |

== LUX 007 ==
LUX 007
- Promotion: LUX Fight League
- Date: November 29, 2019
- Venue: Showcenter Complex
- City: Monterrey, Mexico

Event chronology
| LUX 006 | LUX 007 | LUX 008 |

LUX 007 was a mixed martial arts event held by LUX Fight League on November 29, 2019, at the Showcenter Complex in Monterrey, Mexico.

=== Background ===
A fight between Diego Lopes, LUX featherweight champion, and Marco Beltrán, LUX bantamweight champion, was announced for the main event; Lopes' title was on the line.

The co-main event featured a lightweight bout for the fifth time and the second time with Sergio Cossio as one of the contenders, who faced Allan Zuñiga.

=== Results ===
Main card
| Weight class | | | | Method | Round | Time | Notes |
|---|---|---|---|---|---|---|---|
| Lightweight | Diego Lopes (c) | def. | Marco Beltrán | Submission (kneebar) | 1 | 3:35 | (Note: For the LUX Lightweight Championship) |
| Lightweight | Sergio Cossio | def. | Allan Zuñiga | TKO (punches) | 3 | 1:41 |
| Lightweight | Hugo Flores | def. | José Ruelas Soto | KO (punch) | 1 | 1:43 |
| Bantamweight | David Mendoza | def. | Kevin García | Decision (unanimous) | 3 | 5:00 |
| Featherweight | Edgar Díaz Guzmán | def. | Miguel Villegas | TKO (punches) | 1 | 0:50 |
| Welterweight | Enrique Granados | def. | Iván Valenzuela | Decision (unanimous) | 3 | 5:00 |
| Flyweight | Alessandro Costa | def. | Diego Ortíz | Decision (unanimous) | 3 | 5:00 |
| Flyweight | Kike González | def. | Jaime Granados | Decision (split) | 3 | 5:00 |
| Featherweight | Erik Silva | def. | Rubén Lozano | Submission (rear-naked choke) | 1 | 3:05 |
| Flyweight | Luis Solorzano | def. | Christian Cerda | Decision (unanimous) | 3 | 5:00 |
| Women's Flyweight | Alejandra Orozco | def. | Eli Rodríguez | Decision (unanimous) | 3 | 5:00 |
| Bantamweight | Ramón Cardozo | def. | Giovanni Guerrero | Decision (unanimous) | 3 | 5:00 |
| Lightweight | Francesco Patrón | def. | Miguel López | Decision (unanimous) | 3 | 5:00 |
| Flyweight | Alan Alexis Castro | def. | Uriel Uribe | Submission (arm-triangle choke) | 1 | 0:51 |
