= 2022 in LUX Fight League =

Information
- First date: February 18, 2022
- Last date: December 9, 2022

Events
- Total events: 10

Fights
- Total fights: 106
- Title fights: 10

The year 2022 was the 6th year in the history of LUX Fight League, a mixed martial arts promotion based in Mexico. In these year, LUX held 10 events.

== Events list ==
#	Event	Date held	Venue	City
1	LUX 020	February 18, 2022	Estadio Plaza de Toros Cancún	Cancún, Mexico
2	LUX 021	March 18, 2022	Showcenter Complex	Monterrey, Mexico
3	LUX 022	May 26, 2022	Pepsi Center WTC	Mexico City, Mexico
4	LUX 023	June 17, 2022	Centro Expositor Puebla	Puebla, Mexico
5	LUX 024	July 15, 2022	Zonkeys Arena	Tijuana, Mexico
6	LUX 025	August 13, 2022	Showcenter Complex	Monterrey, Mexico
7	LUX 026	September 2, 2022	Frontón México	Mexico City, Mexico
8	LUX 027	October 14, 2022	Centro Expositor Puebla	Puebla, Mexico
9	LUX 028	November 18, 2022	Showcenter Complex	Monterrey, Mexico
10	LUX 029	December 9, 2022	Frontón México	Mexico City, Mexico

== LUX 020 ==
LUX 020
- Promotion: LUX Fight League
- Date: February 18, 2022
- Venue: Estadio Plaza de Toros Cancún
- City: Cancún, Mexico

Event chronology
LUX 019	LUX 020	LUX 021

LUX 020 was a mixed martial arts event held by LUX Fight League on February 18, 2022, at the Estadio Plaza de Toros Cancún in Cancún, Mexico.

=== Background ===
A fight for the LUX Featherweight Championship between Erik Silva and Edgar García Cabello headlined the event.

The co-main event featured a lightweight fight between Alan Domínguez and David Briones.

=== Results ===
Main card
Weight class				Method	Round	Time	Notes
Featherweight	Erik Silva	def.	Edgar García Cabello	Submission (rear-naked choke)	1	3:50	(Note: For the LUX Featherweight Championship)
Lightweight	Alan Domínguez	def.	David Briones	Decision (unanimous)	3	5:00
Flyweight	Ramón Cardozo	def.	Fernando Saavedra	TKO (elbow and punches)	2	3:08
Welterweight	Carlos Camargo	def.	Pedro Romero	TKO (head kick and punches)	1	2:55
Catchweight	Andrea Vázquez	def.	Dayerlin Colmenares	Decision (unanimous)	3	5:00
Featherweight	Rodolfo Rubio	def.	Paul Márquez Moreno	TKO	2	4:06
Lightweight	Luis Márquez	def.	Luis Pérez	Decision (unanimous)	3	5:00
Bantamweight	Mauricio Partida	def.	Libo López	TKO (punches)	1	2:27
Flyweight	Cesar Vázquez Jr.	def.	Néstor Ruíz	TKO (punches)	1	4:53
Bantamweight	Allan Ruíz	def.	Héctor Ferral	Decision (split)	3	5:00

== LUX 021 ==
LUX 021
- Promotion: LUX Fight League
- Date: March 18, 2022
- Venue: Showcenter Complex
- City: Monterrey, Mexico

Event chronology
LUX 020	LUX 021	LUX 022

LUX 021 was a mixed martial arts event held by LUX Fight League on March 18, 2022, at the Showcenter Complex in Monterrey, Mexico.

=== Background ===
A fight between Victoria Alba and Daniela Villasmil for the inaugural LUX Women's Flyweight Championship was announced as the main event.

The co-main event featured a flyweight fight between Jorge Calvo Martin and Emilio Cuéllar, with the winner earning the right to challenge Alessandro Costa for the division title.

=== Results ===
Main card
Weight class				Method	Round	Time	Notes
Women's Flyweight	Victoria Alba	def.	Daniela Villasmil	TKO (punches)	4	0:46	(Note: For the LUX Women's Flyweight Championship)
Flyweight	Jorge Calvo Martin	def.	Emilio Cuéllar	Decision (split)	3	5:00
Bantamweight	Irvin Amaya	def.	José Roura	Decision (unanimous)	3	5:00
Bantamweight	Pedro Peña	def.	Kevin Morales	Decision (unanimous)	3	5:00
Welterweight	Anuar Aburto	def.	Mario Martínez	KO (knee)	1	0:59
Bantamweight	Jorge Manzano	def.	Luis Rey Gallegos	Submission (rear-naked choke)	2	2:48
Flyweight	Luis Iván Rodríguez	def.	Alexis León	Submission	1	0:33
Flyweight	Uriel Uribe	def.	Luis Cabrera	Decision (unanimous)	3	5:00
Women's Strawweight	Yajáira Romo	def.	Leticia Baltazar	Decision (split)	3	5:00
Featherweight	Alejandro Cerquera	def.	Bryan Arteaga	Decision (unanimous)	3	5:00
Bantamweight	Carlos Rivera	def.	Luís Martínez	Submission (rear-naked choke)	1	4:43

== LUX 022 ==
LUX 022
- Promotion: LUX Fight League
- Date: May 26, 2022
- Venue: Pepsi Center WTC
- City: Mexico City, Mexico

Event chronology
LUX 021	LUX 022	LUX 023

LUX 022 was a mixed martial arts event held by LUX Fight League on May 26, 2022, at the Pepsi Center WTC in Mexico City, Mexico.

=== Background ===
In 2021, Sergio Cossio vacated the LUX Lightweight Championship due to injury. Later, it was announced that he would face Édgar Delgado Jiménez for the vacant title in the main event of this event.

A fight between Diana Reyes and Saray Orozco for the LUX Women's Strawweight Championship was also scheduled, which became vacant after the then-champion, Tania Torres, was stripped of the title.

=== Results ===
Main card
Weight class				Method	Round	Time	Notes
Lightweight	Sergio Cossio	def.	Édgar Delgado Jiménez	KO (punch)	1	4:59	(Note: For the LUX Lightweight Championship)
Women's Strawweight	Saray Orozco	def.	Diana Reyes	TKO (doctor stoppage)	3	5:00	(Note: For the LUX Women's Strawweight Championship)
Bantamweight	David Mendoza	def.	Mauricio Nievas	TKO (punches)	2	2:22
Bantamweight	Ronaldo Rodríguez	def.	César Vázquez	Decision (unanimous)	3	5:00
Welterweight	Román Cordova	def.	Adrián Oviedo	Decision (unanimous)	3	5:00
Bantamweight	Kevin García	def.	Roy Benavides	Decision (unanimous)	3	5:00
Women's Strawweight	Nicole Geraldo	def.	Sara Cova	Decision (split)	3	5:00
Featherweight	Jonas Ortega	def.	Kevin Arreola	TKO (punches)	1	0:30
Women's Strawweight	Hannah Ramos	def.	Idari Sánchez	TKO (punches)	3	3:07
Bantamweight	Liborio López	def.	Carlos Garduño	Decision (split)	3	5:00
Flyweight	Rafael Nuñez	def.	César Vázquez Jr.	DQ (illegal knee)	1	1:25

== LUX 023 ==
LUX 023
- Promotion: LUX Fight League
- Date: June 17, 2022
- Venue: Centro Expositor Puebla
- City: Puebla, Mexico

Event chronology
LUX 022	LUX 023	LUX 024

LUX 023 was a mixed martial arts event held by LUX Fight League on June 17, 2022, at the in Centro Expositor Puebla in Puebla, Mexico.

=== Background ===
A fight for the LUX Bantamweight Championship between champion Marco Beltrán and Rodolfo Rubio headlined the event. This was the second time Beltrán and Rubio had faced each other in the cage since 2013, when Rubio won at a regional event.

=== Results ===
Main card
Weight class				Method	Round	Time	Notes
Bantamweight	Marco Beltrán (c)	def.	Rodolfo Rubio	Decision (unanimous)	3	5:00	(Note: For the LUX Bantamweight Championship)
Bantamweight	José Roura	def.	Santiago Prieto	Decision (unanimous)	3	5:00
Featherweight	Francesco Patrón	def.	Allan Zúñiga	Decision (unanimous)	3	5:00
Catchweight	Antonio Suárez	def.	Carlos Arana	Decision (unanimous)	3	5:00
Women's Flyweight	Andrea Vázquez	def.	Linda Martell	TKO (punches)	2	3:28
Bantamweight	Mauricio Partida	def.	Alejandro Guerrero	TKO (punches)	1	0:19
Flyweight	Alexandro Bravo	def.	Fernando Saavedra	Decision (unanimous)	3	5:00
Featherweight	Isaac Samayoa	def.	Carlos Ochoa	TKO (punches)	2	2:19
Bantamweight	Marcelo Morrelli	def.	Jonathan Esquivel	TKO (punches)	3	3:36
Women's Strawweight	Itzel Padilla	def.	Tania Tapía	KO (head kick)	3	0:52

== LUX 024 ==
LUX 024
- Promotion: LUX Fight League
- Date: July 15, 2022
- Venue: Zonkeys Arena
- City: , Tijuana, Mexico

Event chronology
LUX 023	LUX 024	LUX 025

LUX 024 was a mixed martial arts event held by LUX Fight League on July 15, 2022, at the Zonkeys Arena in Tijuana, Mexico.

=== Background ===
A flyweight bout between Ronaldo Rodríguez and Víctor Moreno headlined the event.

=== Results ===
Main card
Weight class				Method	Round	Time	Notes
Flyweight	Ronaldo Rodríguez	def.	Víctor Moreno	Decision (split)	3	5:00
Bantamweight	Luis Guerrero	def.	Andrés Leal	TKO (punches)	2	1:30
Catchweight	Alan Domínguez	def.	Leonel Rojas	TKO (punches)	1	3:27
Catchweight	Juan Pablo González	def.	Uriel Cossio	Decision (split)	3	5:00
Catchweight	Diego Ortíz	def.	Christian Cerda	Submission (heel hook)	1	1:54
Catchweight	Alejandro Villarreal	def.	Uriel Uribe	Submission (triangle choke)	1	0:47
Catchweight	Cesar Vázquez Jr.	def.	Kevin Fregoso	Submission (triangle choke)	1	3:29
Bantamweight	Fabian López	def.	Luis Piñango	TKO (punches)	1	4:08
Welterweight	Alexis Miranda	def.	Bryan Ulises	TKO (punches)	1	2:31
Catchweight	Dana García	def.	Leticia Baltazar	Submission (rear-naked choke)	3	1:50
Featherweight	Alejandro Corrales	def.	Ernesto Gaitán	TKO (punches)	3	0:39

== LUX 025 ==
LUX 025
- Promotion: LUX Fight League
- Date: August 13, 2022
- Venue: Showcenter Complex
- City: Monterrey, Mexico

Event chronology
LUX 024	LUX 025	LUX 026

LUX 025 was a mixed martial arts event held by LUX Fight League on August 13, 2022, at the Showcenter Complex in Monterrey, Mexico.

=== Background ===
A bantamweight bout between Kevin García and Irvin Amaya headlined the event.

=== Results ===
Main card
Weight class				Method	Round	Time	Notes
Bantamweight	Kevin García	def.	Irvin Amaya	Decision (unanimous)	3	5:00
Flyweight	Luis Iván Rodríguez	def.	Victor Navarro	Submission (guillotine choke)	1	1:55
Catchweight	Mauricio Nievas	def.	Marcos Covarrubias	TKO (punches)	1	3:28
Women's Strawweight	Yajáira Romo	def.	Hannah Ramos	Decision (unanimous)	3	5:00
Bantamweight	Jaime Londoño	def.	Edson Marín	TKO (punches)	2	0:58
Bantamweight	Luis Cabrera	def.	Juan Carlos Navarro	KO (punch)	1	0:54
Featherweight	Adrián Cortez	def.	Tony Ortiz	Decision (unanimous)	3	5:00
Flyweight	Ulises Centeros	def.	Efren Tijerina	DQ (illegal knee)	1	2:13
Bantamweight	Guillermo Vidañez	def.	Erick Gaitán	TKO (punches)	1	2:43

== LUX 026 ==
LUX 026
- Promotion: LUX Fight League
- Date: September 2, 2022
- Venue: Frontón México
- City: Mexico City, Mexico

Event chronology
LUX 025	LUX 026	LUX 027

LUX 026 was a mixed martial arts event held by LUX Fight League on September 2, 2022, at the Frontón México in Mexico City, Mexico.

=== Background ===
A bantamweight bout between Rodolfo Rubio and David Mendoza headlined the event.

=== Results ===
Main card
Weight class				Method	Round	Time	Notes
Bantamweight	Rodolfo Rubio	def.	David Mendoza	Submission (armbar)	1	2:43
Bantamweight	Luis Guerrero	def.	Fredy Villegas	KO (punch)	1	4:56
Catchweight	Mauricio Partida	def.	Javier Hernández	TKO (punches)	1	3:18
Bantamweight	Abraham Nava	def.	Guillermo Torres	KO (punch)	1	0:51
Welterweight	Raúl Zaragoza	def.	Erick Garibay	Decision (unanimous)	3	5:00
Featherweight	Jefferson Vargas	def.	Jonas Ortega	Decision (unanimous)	3	5:00
Catchweight	Luis Cabrera	def.	Andrés Portocarrero	KO (body kick)	2	1:15
Catchweight	Alberto Sánchez	def.	Javier Reyes Saucedo	Decision (split)	3	5:00
Women's Strawweight	Daniela Meléndez	def.	Judith Bolaños	Submission (armbar)	1	3:45
Lightweight	Alejandro Cerquera	def.	Pedro Rubio	TKO (punches)	3	2:28

== LUX 027 ==
LUX 027
- Promotion: LUX Fight League
- Date: October 14, 2022
- Venue: Centro Expositor Puebla
- City: Puebla, Mexico

Event chronology
LUX 026	LUX 027	LUX 028

LUX 027 was a mixed martial arts event held by LUX Fight League on October 14, 2022, at the in Centro Expositor Puebla in Puebla, Mexico.

=== Background ===
A fight for the LUX Flyweight Championship between champion Alessandro Costa and Carlos Gómez headlined the event. Costa made his return to LUX after his stint on Dana White's Contender Series.

The co-main event was initially a bantamweight fight between Édgar Delgado Jiménez and Walter Reyes. However, it was changed to a catchweight fight.

=== Results ===
Main card
Weight class				Method	Round	Time	Notes
Flyweight	Alessandro Costa (c)	def.	Carlos Gómez	KO (punch)	1	0:12	(Note: For the LUX Flyweight Championship)
Catchweight	Édgar Delgado Jiménez	def.	Walter Reyes	Submission (armbar)	1	1:43
Lightweight	Carlos Camargo	def.	Luis Márquez	Decision (unanimous)	3	5:00
Bantamweight	César Vázquez	def.	Jorge Manzano	Submission (guillotine choke)	1	3:12
Welterweight	Anuar Aburto	def.	Art Hernandez	Submission (rear-naked choke)	1	3:17
Flyweight	Cesar Vázquez Jr.	def.	Yahir Ramírez	Submission (rear-naked choke)	1	4:34
Bantamweight	Uriel Cossio	def.	David Bento	KO (head kick)	1	3:07
Flyweight	Ricardo Hussein	def.	Alexis León	KO (punch)	1	4:42
Welterweight	Antonio Arellano	def.	Manuel Romero	Submission (rear-naked choke)	2	2:28
Women's Strawweight	Diana García	def.	Brenda Arias	Decision (unanimous)	3	5:00
Featherweight	Salvador Cuevas	def.	Andrey García	Submission (rear-naked choke)	1	3:03

== LUX 028 ==
LUX 028
- Promotion: LUX Fight League
- Date: November 18, 2022
- Venue: Showcenter Complex
- City: Monterrey, Mexico

Event chronology
LUX 027	LUX 028	LUX 029

LUX 028 was a mixed martial arts event held by LUX Fight League on November 18, 2022, at the Showcenter Complex in Monterrey, Mexico.

=== Background ===
A fight for the LUX Women's Flyweight Championship between champion Victoria Alba and Eli Rodríguez headlined the event.

The co-main event was a fight for the LUX Interim Women's Strawweight Championship between Andrea Vázquez and Yajáira Romo.

=== Results ===
Main card
Weight class				Method	Round	Time	Notes
Women's Flyweight	Eli Rodríguez	def.	Victoria Alba (c)	TKO (punches)	2	2:39	(Note: For the LUX Women's Flyweight Championship)
Women's Strawweight	Andrea Vázquez	def.	Yajáira Romo	Submission (guillotine choke)	4	4:40	(Note: For the LUX Women's Interim Strawweight Championship)
Featherweight	Diego Lopes	def.	Ángel Rodríguez	TKO (punches)	2	0:48
Featherweight	Juan Álvarez	def.	Ricardo Arreola	KO (punch)	3	0:22
Flyweight	Luis Iván Rodríguez	def.	Emilia Cuéllar	Decision (unanimous)	3	5:00
Bantamweight	Mauricio Nievas	def.	Kevin García	Decision (unanimous)	3	5:00
Bantamweight	Irvin Amaya	def.	Abraham Nava	Decision (unanimous)	3	5:00
Flyweight	Alexandro Bravo	def.	Alejandro Villarreal	KO (punch)	1	1:28
Bantamweight	Kevin Morales	def.	Fabian López	Decision (unanimous)	3	5:00
Flyweight	Uriel Uribe	def.	Fernando Saavedra	Decision (unanimous)	3	5:00
Women's Flyweight	Itzel Padilla	def.	Monica Alarcón	Submission (rear-naked choke)	1	1:57
Bantamweight	Juan Carlos Navarro	def.	Ricardo Garza	Decision (unanimous)	3	5:00

== LUX 029 ==
LUX 029
- Promotion: LUX Fight League
- Date: December 9, 2022
- Venue: Frontón México
- City: Mexico City, Mexico

Event chronology
LUX 028	LUX 029	LUX 030

LUX 029 was a mixed martial arts event held by LUX Fight League on December 9, 2022, at the Frontón México in Mexico City, Mexico.

=== Background ===
A fight for the LUX Lightweight Championship between champion Sergio Cossio and Fernando Martínez headlined the event.

The co-main event was a fight for the LUX Bantamweight Championship between Marco Beltrán and José Roura.

=== Results ===
Main card
Weight class				Method	Round	Time	Notes
Lightweight	Sergio Cossio (c)	def.	Fernando Martínez	TKO (doctor stoppage)	5	2:00	(Note: For the LUX Lightweight Championship)
Bantamweight	Marco Beltrán	def.	José Roura	Decision (unanimous)	5	5:00	(Note: For the LUX Bantamweight Championship)
Bantamweight	Ronaldo Rodríguez	def.	Jaime Londoño	Submission (guillotine choke)	2	2:17
Flyweight	Luis Solorzano	def.	Jesús Siller	Decision (unanimous)	3	5:00
Bantamweight	Víctor Moreno	def.	Jordi Maya	Submission (kneebar)	1	4:01
Bantamweight	Mauricio Partida	def.	Andrés Leal	Decision (unanimous)	3	5:00
Bantamweight	Santiago Prieto	def.	Liborio López	Submission (rear-naked choke)	1	2:26
Women's Strawweight	Nicole Geraldo	def.	Yaneth Vidal	Decision (unanimous)	3	5:00
Catchweight	Martín González	def.	Carlos Arana	TKO (punches)	3	2:17
Welterweight	Raúl Zaragoza	def.	Bryan Ulises	Submission (rear-naked choke)	2	3:11
Featherweight	Alejandro Quero	def.	Nicolás Murdoch	Submission (rear-naked choke)	1	1:29
