= 2026 in LUX Fight League =

Information
- First date: February 13, 2026
- Last date: TBD

The year 2026 is the 10th year in the history of the LUX Fight League, a mixed martial arts promotion based in Mexico.

== Events list ==
#	Event	Date	Venue	Location
1	LUX 058	February 13, 2026	Showcenter Complex	Monterrey, Mexico
2	LUX 059	February 27, 2026	TBA	Mexico City, Mexico
3	LUX 060	April 24, 2026	CODE Alcalde Dome	Guadalajara, Mexico
4	LUX 061	May 29, 2026	Azteca Estudios	Mexico City, Mexico
5	LUX 062	August 14, 2026	Showcenter Complex	Monterrey, Mexico
6	LUX 063	October 2, 2026	Auditorio Arteaga	Querétaro, Mexico

== LUX 058 ==
LUX 058
- Promotion: LUX Fight League
- Date: February 13, 2026
- Venue: Showcenter Complex
- City: Monterrey, Mexico

Event chronology
LUX 057	LUX 058	LUX 059

LUX 058 was a mixed martial arts event held by LUX Fight League on February 13, 2026, at the Showcenter Complex in Monterrey, Mexico.

=== Background ===
Antonio Suarez was scheduled to defend his LUX Welterweight Championship against Martin Gonzalez, but weeks before the event, it was reported that Suarez suffered an injury that left him off the card. Alan Dominguez, who had recently competed in PFL, was then scheduled as Gonzalez's new opponent to compete for the interim title.

For the co-main event, a fight for the LUX Flyweight Championship between champion Jorge Calvo and Paulino Siller was scheduled.

=== Results ===
Main card
Weight class				Method	Round	Time	Notes
Welterweight	Martín González	def.	Alan Domínguez	TKO (punches)	3	0:45	(Note: For the LUX Welterweight Championship)
Flyweight	Paulino Siller	def.	Jorge Calvo Martín (c)	Decision (unanimous)	5	5:00	(Note: For the LUX Flyweight Championship)
Bantamweight	Santiago Prieto	def.	Fabian López	Submission (anaconda choke)	1	1:46
Flyweight	Luis Elías	def.	Kike González	Decision (split)	3	5:00
Bantamweight	Luis González	def.	Luis Rey Gallegos	Submission (rear-naked choke)	1	4:48
Flyweight	Luis Cabrera	def.	Anthony Ramírez	Decision (unanimous)	3	5:00
Lightweight	Pedro Rubio	def.	Felipe Hernández	TKO (punches)	2	4:00
Catchweight (130 lb)	Jair Landa	def.	Alex Muñíz	TKO (head kick and punches)	2	1:03
Catchweight (120 lb)	Julieta Hernández	def.	Sofia Garza	Decision (unanimous)	3	5:00

== LUX 059 ==
LUX 059
- Promotion: LUX Fight League
- Date: February 27, 2026
- City: Mexico City, Mexico

Event chronology
LUX 058	LUX 059	LUX 060

LUX 059 was a mixed martial arts event held by LUX Fight League on February 27, 2026, at the TBA in Mexico City, Mexico.

=== Background ===
A flyweight bout between Cesar Vázquez Jr. and undefeated prospect Nicolás Bojaca headlined the event.

The co-main event featured a featherweight fight newcomers Alejandro Flores García and Manuel Exposito.

=== Results ===
Main card
Weight class				Method	Round	Time	Notes
Flyweight	Nicolás Bojaca	def.	Cesar Vázquez Jr.	KO (punches)	1	1:43
Featherweight	Alejandro Flores García	def.	Manuel Exposito	TKO (retirement)	1	5:00
Lightweight	Brayham Zurcher	def.	Stiven Valencia	Decision (unanimous)	3	5:00
Flyweight	Roy Benavides	def.	Axel Osuna	TKO (punches)	1	1:43
Featherweight	Alejandro Cerquera	def.	Aarón Cañarte	TKO (punches)	3	3:55
Women's Strawweight	Julieta Martínez	def.	Jéssica Zarate	TKO (punches)	3	5:00
Women's Strawweight	Karla Pastrana	def.	Nadia Vera	Decision (unanimous)	3	5:00
Catchweight (150 lb)	Javier Gil Fernández	def.	Eduardo Ramírez	Submission (rear-naked choke)	1	3:56
Bantamweight	Juán Sebastián Medina	def.	Esteban Nocelo	Submission (armbar)	1	4:36
Flyweight	Zaid Varela	def.	Cesar Bourjac	Submission (armbar)	1	0:23
Women's Strawweight	Jade Moctezuma	def.	Miroslava Cauich Manzanero	Decision (unanimous)	3	5:00

== LUX 060 ==
LUX 060
- Promotion: LUX Fight League
- Date: April 24, 2026
- Venue: CODE Alcalde Dome
- City: Guadalajara, Mexico

Event chronology
LUX 059	LUX 060	LUX 061

LUX 060 was a mixed martial arts event held by LUX Fight League on April 24, 2026, at the CODE Alcalde Dome in Guadalajara, Mexico.

=== Background ===
A fight for the LUX Lightweight Championship between champion Kazula Vargas and Miguel Villegas headlined the event.

The co-main event featured a bantamweight fight between Brandon González and undefeated Sergio Barajas.

At this event, two fights corresponding to the quarter-finals of the Torneo Guerreras LUX for the LUX Women's Strawweight Championship were also held: Daniela López against Francis Carrillo and Ainara Rocío Vergara against Alejandra Lugo.

=== Results ===
Main card
Weight class				Method	Round	Time	Notes
Lightweight	Kazula Vargas (c)	def.	Miguel Villegas	Decision (split)	5	5:00	(Note: For the LUX Lightweight Championship)
Bantamweight	Sergio Barajas	def.	Brandon González	Decision (unanimous)	3	5:00
Bantamweight	David Mendoza	def.	Jaime Londoño	TKO (punches)	2	4:49
Flyweight	Yahir Ramírez	def.	Luis Quintana	TKO (punches and elbows)	1	3:41
Lightweight	Silvestre Sánchez	def.	Irving Cardona	KO (Punch)	1	0:18
Flyweight	Jorge López Pérez	def.	Gerardo Sánchez	Submission (armbar)	2	3:08
Flyweight	Luis Hernández	def.	Ricardo Reyes	Decision (unanimous)	3	5:00
Catchweight (150 lb)	Bryan Orozco	def.	Oswaldo Castañeda	Submission (armbar)	2	3:55
Women's Strawweight	Daniela López	def.	Francis D'Sailly Carrillo	TKO (punches)	1	3:08
Women's Strawweight	Ainara Rocío Vergara	def.	Alejandra Lugo	Decision (split)	3	5:00

== LUX 061 ==
LUX 061
- Promotion: LUX Fight League
- Date: May 29, 2026
- Venue: Azteca Estudios
- City: Mexico City, Mexico

Event chronology
LUX 060	LUX 061	LUX 062

LUX 061 was a mixed martial arts event held by LUX Fight League on May 29, 2026, at the Azteca Estudios in Mexico City, Mexico.

=== Background ===
A fight for the vacant LUX Women's Strawweight Championship between Hannah Ramos and Melany Gómez headlined the event.

=== Results ===
Main card
Weight class				Method	Round	Time	Notes
Women's Strawweight	Melany Gómez	def.	Hannah Ramos	TKO (elbows and punches)	1	4:57	(Note: For the LUX Women's Strawweight Championship)
Featherweight	Alejandro Corrales	def.	Julio Ruíz	TKO (arm injury)	3	1:12
Flyweight	Abdi Iniestra	def.	Alexis León	Submission (rear-naked choke)	1	3:12
Featherweight	Uriel Cossio	def.	Armando Figuera	Submission (arm-triangle choke)	1	3:09
Flyweight	Gabriel Urbino	def.	Jesús Siller	Decision (unanimous)	3	5:00
Bantamweight	Omar Ortíz Robles	def.	Juan Zuñiga	Decision (split)	3	5:00
Bantamweight	Fernando Torres	def.	Rodrigo Maldonado	Decision (unanimous)	3	5:00
Flyweight	Emiliano Sanvicente	def.	Jesús Osorno	TKO (leg kick and elbows)	2	2:44
Catchweight (165 lb)	Diego García	def.	Bryan Vera	TKO (punches)	1	3:57
Women's Strawweight	Camila Argueta	def.	Brígida Ruíz	Submission (armbar)	2	3:26

== LUX 062 ==
LUX 062
- Promotion: LUX Fight League
- Date: August 14, 2026
- Venue: Showcenter Complex
- City: Monterrey, Mexico

Event chronology
LUX 061	LUX 062	LUX 063

LUX 062 was a mixed martial arts event held by LUX Fight League on August 14, 2026, at the Showcenter Complex in Monterrey, Mexico.

=== Background ===
A fight for the LUX Lightweight Championship between champion Miguel Villegas and Alejandro Flores García headlined the event.

The co-main event featured a bantamweight fight Santiago Prieto and David Mendoza, who had his 15th fight in LUX.

=== Results ===
Main card
Weight class				Method	Round	Time	Notes
Lightweight	Alejandro Flores García	def.	Miguel Villegas (c)	TKO (punches)	1	4:27	(Note: For the LUX Lightweight Championship)
Bantamweight	Santiago Prieto	def.	David Mendoza	Decision (unanimous)	3	5:00
Bantamweight	Luis González	def.	Gabriel Martínez	Submission (rear-naked choke)	1	2:34
Flyweight	Denylson Martínez	def.	Jorge Cobos Marin	TKO (punches)	1	0:52
Women's Strawweight	Karen Martínez	def.	Yajáira Romo	Decision (unanimous)	3	5:00
Catchweight (175 lbs)	Anuar Aburto	def.	Roman Córdova	Submission (triangle armbar)	2	3:24
Flyweight	Jair Landa	def.	Néstor Huerta	Decision (unanimous)	3	5:00
Catchweight (160 lbs)	Eliel Mota	def.	Osvaldo Pérez	TKO (punches)	2	0:09
Catchweight (150 lbs)	Néstor Martínez	def.	Abraham Nava	Decision (unanimous)	3	5:00
Women's Strawweight	Danna Cortés	def.	Ahtziri Rendón	Decision (unanimous)	3	5:00

== LUX 063 ==
LUX 063
- Promotion: LUX Fight League
- Date: October 2, 2026
- Venue: Auditorio Arteaga
- City: Querétaro, Mexico

Event chronology
LUX 062	LUX 063	LUX 064

LUX 063 was a mixed martial arts event held by LUX Fight League on October 2, 2026, at the Auditorio Arteaga in Querétaro, Mexico.

=== Background ===
A fight for the LUX Flyweight Championship between champion Paulino Siller and undefeated prospect Gabriel Urbino headlined the event.

=== Results ===
Main card
Weight class				Method	Round	Time	Notes
Lightweight	Paulino Siller (c)	def.	Gabriel Urbino	Decision (unanimous)	5	5:00	(Note: For the LUX Flyweight Championship)
Flyweight	Abdi Iniestra	def.	Anthony Ramírez	KO (elbow)	3	4:57
Featherweight	Aarón Cañarte	def.	Uriel Cossio	TKO (punches)	1	2:06
Catchweight (160 lbs)	Alejandro Cerquera	def.	Hugo Rubio	Submission (guillotine choke)	1	1:43
Flyweight	Jorge López	def.	Luis Quintana	TKO (punches)	1	3:41
Lightweight	Diego García	def.	Daniel Reyes	Technical Submission (rear-naked choke)	1	4:24
Catchweight (150 lbs)	Dan Tenoch Jaramillo	vs.	Antonio Jiménez	No Contest (accidental groin kick)	1	1:25
Catchweight (150 lbs)	Luis Gerardo Agillón	def.	David Briones	TKO (punches)	2	3:54
Catchweight (150 lbs)	Francisco Serrano	def.	Juan José Valero	KO (punches)	1	2:18
Women's Strawweight	Camila Reyes	def.	Fernanda Ceja	Submission (armbar)	1	0:00
