= Forum de Mundo Imperial =

Indoor arena in the port of Acapulco, Mexico

Coordinates: 16°46′15″N 99°46′22″W

Forum Mundo Imperial
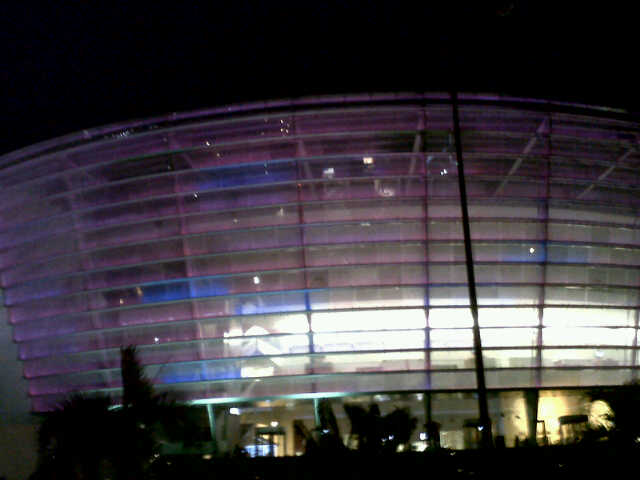
- Interactive map of Forum Mundo Imperial
- Location: Blvd. de las Naciones s/n esq. Blvd. de Barra Vieja, Zona Diamante; Acapulco, Mexico
- Owner: Grupo Autofin
- Seating type: Reserved
- Capacity: 4000
- Type: Indoor theatre

Construction
- Opened: 2008
- Cost: $300 mil.

Website
- Forum de Mundo Imperial

The Forum de Mundo Imperial is an indoor arena with a capacity of 4000 people located in the port of Acapulco.

== Design ==
The forum's design includes a facade lit by 4,000,985 LEDs capable of projecting 16.7 million color combinations, making it the largest LED installation in Latin America. The enclosure is equipped with the latest technology in sound and design and is specially shaped for optimal acoustics. It is also constructed so that the farthest seat is 35 feet away from the stage, and the closest is two meters. The forum is designed for public use, offering VIP boxes and suites as well as general seating. During its four years of operation, the forum has hosted thousands of visitors and artists such as Luis Miguel, Wisin y Yandel, Camila, Alejandro Fernandez, The Cranberries, Gloria Trevi, Paul Anka and Juan Luis Guerra. Additionally, it has hosted major events, including Premios TVyNovelas, Acafest and Premios Telehit.

== See also ==
- Acafest
