= 2018 in LUX Fight League =

Information
- First date: February 17, 2018
- Last date: October 5, 2018

Events
- Total events: 2

Fights
- Total fights: 23

The year 2018 was the second year in the history of LUX Fight League, a mixed martial arts promotion based in Mexico. In this year, LUX held 2 events, both held in Mexico City.

== Events list ==
#	Event	Date held	Venue	City
1	LUX 002	February 17, 2018	Gimnasio Olímpico Juan de la Barrera	Mexico City, Mexico
2	LUX 003	October 5, 2018	Pepsi Center WTC	Mexico City, Mexico

== LUX 002 ==
LUX 002
- Promotion: LUX Fight League
- Date: February 17, 2018
- Venue: Gimnasio Olímpico Juan de la Barrera
- City: Mexico City, Mexico

Event chronology
LUX 001	LUX 002	LUX 003

LUX 002 was a mixed martial arts event held by LUX Fight League on February 17, 2018, at the Gimnasio Olímpico Juan de la Barrera in Mexico City, Mexico.

=== Background ===
After the first event, which was very well received, LUX Fight League announced the second event for February 2018, and unlike the first, this one featured a larger number of fights.

It was announced that Sergio Cossio and Mike De La Torre, the latter of whom had a decent track record in UFC, would headline the event. Meanwhile, the co-main event featured a featherweight bout between veteran Rodolfo Rubio and rookie Luis Vallejo. There was also a women's bantamweight fight between Annely Jiménez García and Flor Sáenz, marking the first time female fighters have been included in a LUX event.

=== Results ===
Main card
Weight class				Method	Round	Time	Notes
Lightweight	Sergio Cossio	def.	Mike De La Torre	Decision (unanimous)	3	5:00
Featherweight	Luis Vallejo	def.	Rodolfo Rubio	TKO (punches)	1	0:51
Lightweight	Efraín Escudero	def.	Jorge López	Submission (rear-naked choke)	1	4:59
Bantamweight	José Luis Calvo	def.	Irvin Amaya	TKO (leg injury)	1	3:10
Catchweight	Nayib López	def.	Alan Domínguez	Decision (unanimous)	3	5:00
Featherweight	Rubén Lozano	def.	Daniel Rico	Decision (unanimous)	3	5:00
Lightweight	José Luis Verdugo	def.	Ricardo Díaz	Decision (unanimous)	3	5:00
Women's Bantamweight	Annely Jiménez García	def.	Flor Sáenz	Submission (choke)	3	2:51
Bantamweight	Roberto Villalobos	def.	Daniel Ortiz	Submission (guillotine choke)	1	4:25

== LUX 003 ==
LUX 003
- Promotion: LUX Fight League
- Date: October 5, 2018
- Venue: Pepsi Center WTC
- City: Mexico City, Mexico

Event chronology
LUX 002	LUX 003	LUX 004

LUX 003 was a mixed martial arts event held by LUX Fight League on October 5, 2018, at the Pepsi Center WTC in Mexico City, Mexico.

=== Background ===
For this event, the number of fights was increased to fourteen; it was also announced that Sergio Cossio and Hugo Flores would headline the main event.

=== Results ===
Main card
Weight class				Method	Round	Time	Notes
Lightweight	Hugo Flores	def.	Sergio Cossio	Decision (unanimous)	3	5:00
Lightweight	José Luis Verdugo	def.	Allan Marín	Decision (unanimous)	3	5:00
Catchweight	Diego Lopes	def.	Luis Guerrero	Submission (armbar)	1	1:38
Catchweight	José Luis Calvo	def.	Daniel Lezama	Decision (unanimous)	3	5:00
Bantamweight	Erick Ruano Barrera	def.	Diego Illescas	Decision (unanimous)	3	5:00
Lightweight	Ignacio Bahamondes	def.	Javier Reyes	TKO (body kick and punches)	1	2:53
Bantamweight	Alex González	def.	Roberto Villalobos	Submission (rear-naked choke)	1	1:36
Catchweight	Enrique González	def.	Luis Vallejo	Submission (guillotine choke)	1	1:08
Women's Strawweight	Paulina Vargas	def.	Fernanda Díaz	TKO (elbows)	2	4:34
Featherweight	David Mendoza	def.	Daniel Vega	TKO (punches)	1	1:15
Featherweight	Álvaro Torres	def.	Jorge Rodríguez	TKO (punches)	1	1:59
Bantamweight	Iván Valenzuela	def.	Diego Velazco	Submission (rear-naked choke)	1	1:03
Bantamweight	César Vázquez	def.	José Luis Rodríguez	TKO (body kick and punches)	2	0:40
Featherweight	Isaac Samaoya	def.	Luis Martínez	Decision (unanimous)	3	5:00
