= Showcenter Complex =

Indoor arena in San Pedro Garza García, Nuevo León, Mexico

Coordinates: 25.6489°N 100.3357°W

- Interactive map of Showcenter Complex
- Location: San Pedro Garza García, Nuevo León, Mexico
- Capacity: 4,500

Construction
- Opened: March 14, 2019

The Showcenter Complex is an indoor arena located in San Pedro Garza García, Nuevo León, Mexico. With a capacity of 4,500, it is primarily used for concerts, shows, and indoor sports.

The Showcenter Complex was opened in March 2019.

The venue was inaugurated on March 14, 2019, by architect Eudelio Mercado and would have several guests, including the municipal president Miguel Treviño de Hoyos and the businessmen and representatives of the Broadway Across America company, Jeff Daniels and Bruce Granath.

== Infrastructure ==
The Showcenter Complex has the infrastructure to host 140 events a year, attracting approximately four million attendees.

- Capacity: Up to 2,700 seated guests.
- Parking: 4,500 spaces owned by the venue, and approximately 5,000 additional spaces available.
