= Tlalnepantla (disambiguation) =

Tlalnepantla de Baz (commonly shortened to Tlalnepantla) is a municipality in the State of Mexico.

Tlalnepantla may also refer to:

- Roman Catholic Archdiocese of Tlalnepantla, State of Mexico
- Tlalnepantla Cathedral, in Tlalnepantla de Baz, Mexico
- Tlalnepantla, Morelos, a municipality in Morelos, Mexico
- Tlalnepantla railway station, operated by Ferrocarriles Suburbanos
- Tlalnepantla Region, intrastate region within the State of Mexico
- Tlalnepantla, Tamazunchale, a town in Tamazunchale, San Luis Potosí, Mexico

== See also ==
- Tlanepantla, a municipality in state of Puebla, Mexico
