= 19th federal electoral district of the State of Mexico =

Federal electoral district of Mexico

State of Mexico's 19th
- Electoral district of the Chamber of Deputies of Mexico

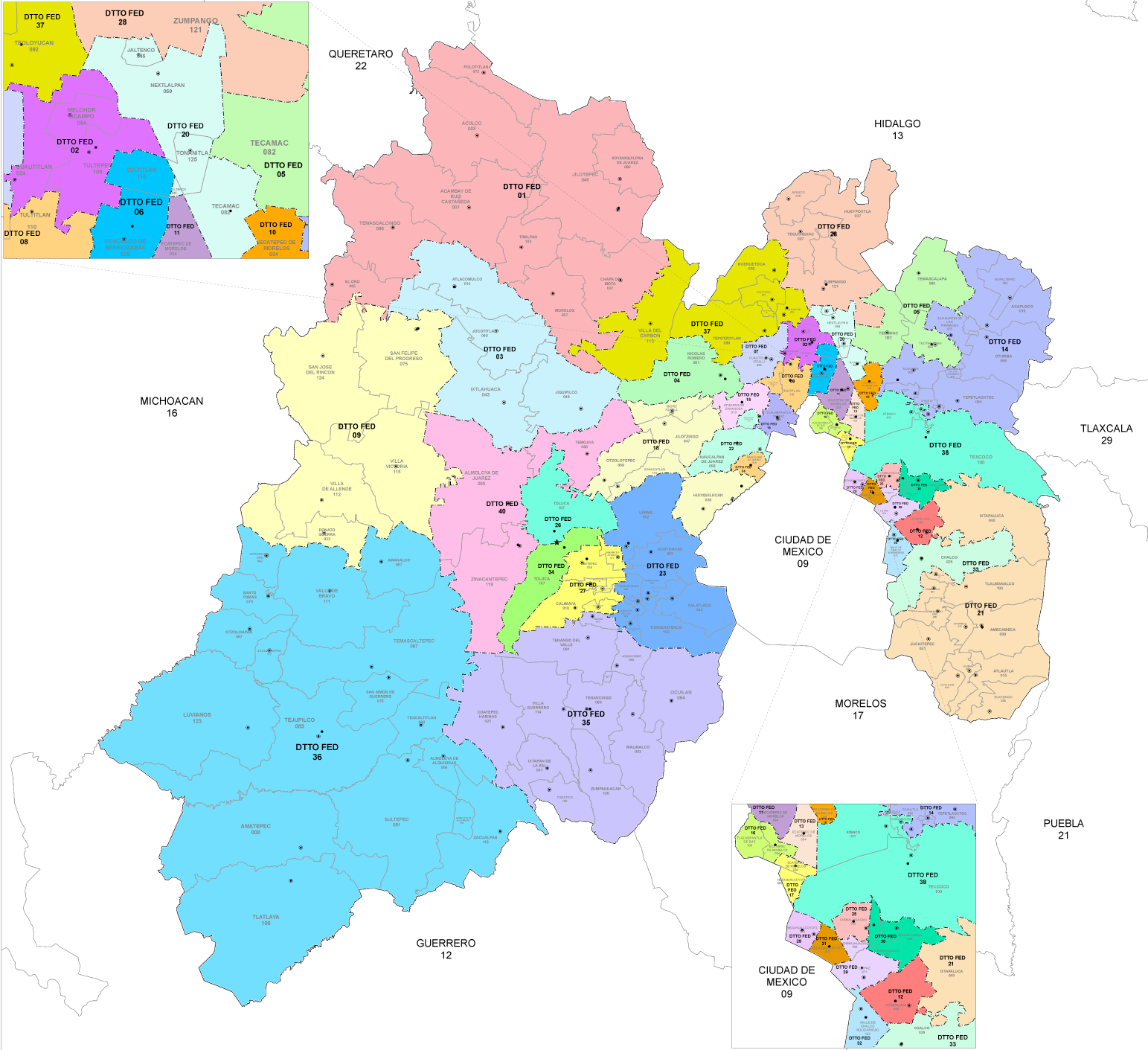
- State of Mexico's districts since 2023

Incumbent
- Member: Gabriela Valdepeñas González
- Party: ▌Morena
- Congress: 66th (2024–2027)

District
- State: State of Mexico
- Head town: Tlalnepantla
- Coordinates: 19°32′N 99°11′W
- Covers: Tlalnepantla de Baz (part)
- PR region: Fifth
- Precincts: 302
- Population: 473,825 (2020 census)

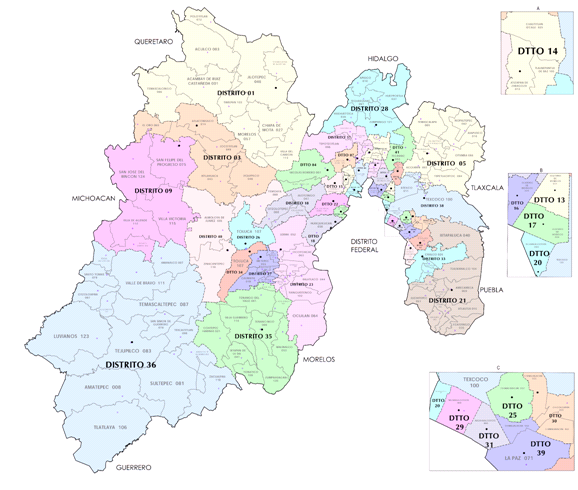
2017–2022 districting scheme

The 19th federal electoral district of the State of Mexico (Spanish: Distrito electoral federal 19 del Estado de México) is one of the 300 electoral districts into which Mexico is divided for elections to the federal Chamber of Deputies and one of 40 such districts in the State of Mexico.

It elects one deputy to the lower house of Congress for each three-year legislative session by means of the first-past-the-post system. Votes cast in the district also count towards the calculation of proportional representation ("plurinominal") deputies elected from the fifth region.

The 19th district was created by the 1977 electoral reforms, which increased the number of single-member seats in the Chamber of Deputies from 196 to 300. Under that plan, the State of Mexico's seat allocation rose from 15 to 34. The new districts were first contended in the 1979 mid-term election.

The current member for the district, elected in the 2024 general election, is Gabriela Valdepeñas González of the National Regeneration Movement (Morena).

== District territory ==
Under the 2023 districting plan adopted by the National Electoral Institute (INE), which is to be used for the 2024, 2027 and 2030 federal elections, the 19th district covers 302 electoral precincts (secciones electorales) across the bulk of one the state's 125 municipalities in the Greater Mexico City urban area:

- Tlalnepantla de Baz (Note: The municipality's eastern exclave belongs to the 16th district.)

The head town (cabecera distrital), where results from individual polling stations are gathered together and tallied, is the city of Tlalnepantla. In the 2020 census, the district reported a total population of 473,825.

== Previous districting schemes ==
Evolution of electoral district numbers
	1974	1978	1996	2005	2017	2023
State of Mexico	15	34	36	40	41	40
Chamber of Deputies	196	300				

Under the previous districting plans enacted by the INE and its predecessors, the 19th district was situated as follows:

2005–2022

The district kept the same configuration under the 2005 and 2017 districting processes. It covered the centre, south and east of the municipality of Tlalnepantla de Baz.

1996–2005

Non-contiguous southern and eastern parts of Tlalnepantla de Baz, separated by the 15th district.

1978–1996

A portion of Naucalpan de Juárez.

== Deputies returned to Congress ==
(Mexico) National parties
- Current
- PAN
- PRI
- PT
- PVEM
- MC
- Morena
- PAZ
- Somos
- Defunct or local only
- PLM
- PNR
- PRM
- PNM
- PP
- PPS
- PARM
- PFCRN
- CON
- PANAL
- PSD
- PES
- PES
- PRD

State of Mexico's 19th district
Election	Deputy	Party	Term	Legislature
1979	Humberto Lira Mora	Institutional Revolutionary Party	1979–1982	51st Congress
1982	Ernesto Andonegui Luna	Institutional Revolutionary Party	1982–1985	52nd Congress
1985	María Guadalupe Ponce Torres	Institutional Revolutionary Party	1985–1988	53rd Congress
1988	Mario Ruiz de Chávez y García	Institutional Revolutionary Party	1988–1991	54th Congress
1991	Enrique Jacob Rocha	Institutional Revolutionary Party	1991–1994	55th Congress
1994	Jorge Adolfo Cejudo Díaz	Institutional Revolutionary Party	1994–1997	56th Congress
1997	Martín Matamoros Castillo	National Action Party (Mexico)	1997–2000	57th Congress
2000	Felipe Olvera Nieto	National Action Party (Mexico)	2000–2003	58th Congress
2003	José Francisco Landero Gutiérrez	National Action Party (Mexico)	2003–2006	59th Congress
2006	Mario Enrique del Toro	Party of the Democratic Revolution	2006–2009	60th Congress
2009	Amador Monroy Estrada	Institutional Revolutionary Party	2009–2012	61st Congress
2012	Aurora Denisse Ugalde Alegría	Institutional Revolutionary Party	2012–2015	62nd Congress
2015	Pablo Básañez García	Institutional Revolutionary Party	2015–2018	63rd Congress
2018	Ulises Murguía Soto	National Regeneration Movement	2018–2021	64th Congress
2021	Krishna Karina Romero Velázquez	National Action Party (Mexico)	2021–2024	65th Congress
2024	Gabriela Valdepeñas González	National Regeneration Movement	2024–2027	66th Congress

== Presidential elections ==
State of Mexico's 19th district
Election	District won by	Party or coalition	%
2018	Andrés Manuel López Obrador	Juntos Haremos Historia	51.4558
2024	Claudia Sheinbaum Pardo	Sigamos Haciendo Historia	50.2266
