= Ronaldo Rodríguez =

Mexican mixed martial artist (born 1999)

- Born: Luis Ronaldo Rodríguez; May 7, 1999 (age 27); Jiquipilas, Chiapas, Mexico
- Other names: Lazy Boy
- Height: 5 ft 6 in (1.68 m)
- Weight: 125 lb (57 kg; 8 st 13 lb)
- Division: Flyweight; Bantamweight
- Fighting out of: Coatzacoalcos, Veracruz, Mexico
- Team: Prime Combat Academy; ADAM Coatzacoalcos
- Years active: 2017–present

Mixed martial arts record
- Total: 20
- Wins: 17
- By knockout: 7
- By submission: 5
- By decision: 4
- By disqualification: 1
- Losses: 3
- By decision: 3

Other information
- Mixed martial arts record from Sherdog

Luis Ronaldo Rodríguez (born May 7, 1999) is a Mexican professional mixed martial artist who currently competes in Flyweight and Bantamweight divisions of Ultimate Fighting Championship (UFC).

== Background ==
He was born in the municipality of Jiquipilas, in the state of Chiapas, but moved with his family to Coatzacoalcos, Veracruz, as a child. It was then that he immersed himself in karate. In interviews, Rodríguez has said that the sport kept him from joining organized crime, unlike many of his acquaintances, since the city of Coatzacoalcos was heavily influenced by crime.

To make ends meet, he started selling freezies (Note: known in Mexico as gelatina, sabalito or bolis, depending on the region.) while also working as a construction worker. With the salary earned from both jobs, Rodríguez moved to Mexico City to begin his MMA career.

== Mixed martial arts career ==
=== Early career and DWCS ===
Lazy Boy's MMA career began on March 19, 2017, with a technical knockout victory. In his next nine fights, he secured eight wins, five of which were in the Jasaji Fighting League (JFL).

He had his first fight in LUX Fight League, Mexico's leading MMA promotion, facing Dagoberto Ferreira on February 14, 2020, at LUX 008. Ronaldo emerged victorious after landing several elbow strikes.

He was given a chance for a UFC contract on Dana White's Contender Series, fighting Jerome Rivera at Dana White's Contender Series 27 on August 4, 2020. However, he lost the fight by unanimous decision.

=== LUX Fight League ===
After failing to secure a UFC contract and winning a fight at the iFF3 regional event, Rodríguez returned to LUX. He faced César Vázquez on May 26, 2022, at LUX 022 and won the fight by unanimous decision.

Rodríguez faced Víctor Moreno on July 15, 2022, at LUX 024 main event bout. He won the fight by split decision.

Rodríguez faced Jaime Londoño on December 9, 2022, at LUX 029. He won the fight by submission in the second round after locking in a rear-naked choke.

Rodríguez faced Angel Rodríguez on May 19, 2023, at LUX 032. He won the fight after a doctor's stoppage in the third round. This would be his last fight in the promotion, as he subsequently signed with the UFC.

=== Ultimate Fighting Championship ===
Rodríguez made his promotional UFC debut against Denys Bondar on February 24, 2024, at UFC Fight Night 237. He won the fight by submission in the second round with a rear-naked choke.

Rodríguez faced Ode' Osbourne on September 14, 2024, at UFC 306. He won the fight by unanimous decision.

Rodríguez faced Kevin Borjas on March 29, 2025, at UFC on ESPN 64. He lost the fight by unanimous decision. Before the fight, he weighed in at 127 pounds, one pound over the flyweight limit for non-title fights, so the bout proceeded at a catchweight, and he received a 20% penalty, which went to Borjas.

In August 2025, Rodríguez announced that he was leaving the flyweight division to change weight classes, due to his weight problems prior to the fight with Borjas months earlier.

== Personal life ==
Rodríguez has a daughter with his wife Nina Medina. The couple had been dating since they were young, when Rodríguez still lived in Coatzacoalcos, but they separated after he moved to Mexico City. In 2022, they got engaged and later moved to Las Vegas.

== Championships and accomplishments ==
- Jasaji Fighting League
  - JFL Bantamweight Championship (two times)

== Mixed martial arts record ==
Professional record breakdown
20 matches	17 wins	3 losses
By knockout	7	0
By submission	5	0
By decision	4	3
By disqualification	1	0

Res.	Record	Opponent	Method	Event	Date	Round	Time	Location	Notes
Loss	17–3	Kevin Borjas	Decision (unanimous)	UFC on ESPN: Moreno vs. Erceg	March 29, 2025	3	5:00	Mexico City, Mexico	Catchweight (127 lb) bout; Rodríguez missed weight.
Win	17–2	Ode' Osbourne	Decision (unanimous)	UFC 306	September 14, 2024	3	5:00	Las Vegas, Nevada, United States	
Win	16–2	Denys Bondar	Submission (rear-naked choke)	UFC Fight Night: Moreno vs. Royval 2	February 24, 2024	2	4:59	Mexico City, Mexico	Return to Flyweight.
Win	15–2	Angel Rodriguez	TKO (doctor stoppage)	LUX 032	May 19, 2023	3	1:00	Guadalajara, Mexico	
Win	14–2	Jaime Londoño	Submission (guillotine choke)	LUX 029	December 9, 2022	2	2:17	Mexico City, Mexico	
Win	13–2	Victor Moreno	Decision (split)	LUX 024	July 15, 2022	3	5:00	Tijuana, Mexico	
Win	12–2	César Vázquez	Decision (unanimous)	LUX 022	May 26, 2022	3	5:00	Mexico City, Mexico	
Win	11–2	Paul Márquez Moreno	TKO (punch)	iKon Fighting Federation 3	November 20, 2020	1	1:16	San Carlos Nuevo Guaymas, Mexico	Return to Bantamweight.
Loss	10–2	Jerome Rivera	Decision (unanimous)	Dana White's Contender Series 27	August 4, 2020	3	5:00	Las Vegas, Nevada, United States	Flyweight debut.
Win	10–1	Dagoberto Ferreira	TKO (punches)	LUX 008	February 14, 2020	2	1:35	Mexico City, Mexico	Catchweight (130 lb) bout.
Win	9–1	Edgar Garcia	TKO (punches)	Jasaji Fighting League: 135 Pound Grand Prix	September 28, 2019	2	0:42	Tlalnepantla de Baz, Mexico	Won the JFL MMA Bantamweight Grand Prix.
Win	8–1	Jorge Manzano	TKO (punches)	Jasaji Fighting League: 135 Pound Grand Prix	September 28, 2019	3	0:33	Tlalnepantla de Baz, Mexico	JFL MMA Bantamweight Grand Prix Semifinal.
Win	7–1	José Roura	Decision (unanimous)	Jasaji Fighting League: Fight Night 6	November 17, 2018	3	5:00	Tlalnepantla de Baz, Mexico	Won the JFL MMA Bantamweight Championship.
Win	6–1	Omar Hernandez	Submission (armbar)	Guerra en Veracruz 6	July 21, 2018	1	3:38	Veracruz, Mexico	
Win	5–1	Armando Valenzuela	Submission (rear-naked choke)	Xtreme Fighters Latino 38	June 1, 2018	1	2:38	Mexico City, Mexico	Catchweight (139 lb) bout.
Loss	4–1	Eduardo Morales	Decision (split)	Center Real Fights 28	March 24, 2018	3	5:00	Cancún, Mexico	
Win	4–0	Giovanni Guerrero	Submission (rear-naked choke)	Jasaji Fighting League 18	January 18, 2018	2	2:46	Tlalnepantla de Baz, Mexico	
Win	3–0	Caleb Moctezuma	TKO (leg kick and punches)	Warriors League 3	December 16, 2017	3	0:22	Pachuca, Mexico	
Win	2–0	Giovanni Guerrero	DQ (knee to head of grounded fighter)	Jasaji Fighting League 17	August 23, 2017	1	2:54	Tlalnepantla de Baz, Mexico	
Win	1–0	Eddy Perez	TKO (punches)	Warriors League 2	March 19, 2017	1	2:12	Pachuca, Mexico	Bantamweight debut.

== See also ==
- List of current UFC fighters
- List of Mexican UFC fighters
- List of male mixed martial artists
