= Amador Monroy Estrada =

Mexican politician

- Born: 11 April 1951 (age 75); Tlalnepantla de Baz, State of Mexico
- Occupation: Politician
- Political party: PRI

Amador Monroy Estrada (born 11 April 1951) is a Mexican politician from the Institutional Revolutionary Party (PRI).

He has been elected to the Chamber of Deputies on two occasions: in the 1991 mid-terms to represent the State of Mexico's 14th district, and in the 2009 mid-terms for the State of Mexico's 19th district.
