= José Francisco Landero =

Mexican politician

José Francisco Landero Gutiérrez
- Born: 26 April 1971 (age 55); Tlalnepantla de Baz, State of Mexico, Mexico
- Occupation: Politician
- Political party: PAN

José Francisco Javier Landero Gutiérrez (born 26 April 1971) is a Mexican politician affiliated with the National Action Party (PAN). In the 2003 mid-terms he was elected to the Chamber of Deputies to represent the State of Mexico's 19th district during the 59th session of Congress.
