= Aurora Ugalde =

Mexican politician

Aurora Denisse Ugalde
- Born: Aurora Denisse Ugalde Alegría; 17 October 1979 (age 46); Tlalnepantla de Baz, State of Mexico, Mexico
- Occupation: Politician
- Political party: PRI

Aurora Denisse Ugalde Alegría (born 17 October 1979) is a Mexican politician affiliated with the Institutional Revolutionary Party (PRI). In the 2012 general election she was elected to the Chamber of Deputies to represent the State of Mexico's 19th district during the 62nd session of Congress.
