= Instituto Thomas Jefferson =

Mexican private school

Instituto Thomas Jefferson (ITJ) is a private school in Tlalnepantla de Baz, State of Mexico, in the Mexico City metropolitan area. It serves preschool through senior high school.
