= Raciel Pérez Cruz =

Mexican politician (born 1970)

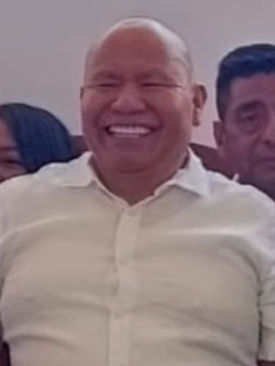
- Pérez Cruz in 2024
- Born: 22 November 1970 (age 55); State of Mexico, Mexico
- Occupation: Politician
- Political party: Morena

Raciel Pérez Cruz (born 22 November 1970) is a Mexican politician affiliated with Morena. He was a federal legislator from 2006 to 2009, elected as a member of the Party of the Democratic Revolution (PRD), and has served as the mayor of Tlalnepantla de Baz twice, from 2019 to 2021 and again since 2025.

== Early career ==
Raciel Pérez Cruz was born on 22 November 1970. He earned undergraduate and master's degrees in political science in the 1990s before working for the Secretariat of the Interior (SEGOB) from 1998 to 1999. From 1999 to 2001 and again from 2002 to 2003, he worked at the Instituto Electoral del Estado de México (IEEM), leaving to advise the municipal government of Tlalnepantla de Baz from 2001 to 2002. He also taught at several UNAM schools and the Universidad Autónoma del Estado de México (UAEMex).

After leaving the IEEM in 2003, Pérez Cruz became active in the Party of the Democratic Revolution (PRD) and represented the party in various IEEM committees in Tlalnepantla and at the state level, including as a state delegate in 2005. In the 2006 general election, he was elected to the Chamber of Deputies to represent the State of Mexico's 16th district for the PRD during the 60th session of Congress. He was a secretary on the Cooperative Promotion and Social Economy Commission and served on three other commissions in his time as a federal deputy. By 2018, he was teaching political science at the UNAM.

== Mayor of Tlalnepantla de Baz ==
In 2018, Raciel Pérez Cruz won election for mayor of Tlalnepantla de Baz as the Morena-backed candidate in the Juntos Haremos Historia coalition, with his term starting in 2019. During his first term, he called on the state legislature to close a local landfill that he claimed was at capacity. In 2020, his government proposed constructing a football stadium in the municipality as the centerpiece of a mixed-use development to be known as Punta Azul; directors of the football club Cruz Azul denied any connection to the project, even though team president Guillermo Álvarez Cuevas had previously met with Pérez Cruz to discuss possible stadium plans. He was criticized for delays in payments to families affected by a landslide on the slopes of Cerro del Chiquihuite; by late 2021, the victims had only received one of three promised payments.

In 2021, Pérez Cruz ran for reelection but lost to his opponent, Marco Antonio Rodríguez Hurtado, in a PAN–PRI–PRD coalition, Antonio Rodríguez Hurtado. The defeat was part of a setback for Morena, which lost mayorships in a number of cities in the State of Mexico to the opposition. Days before the election, his house was shot by unknown assailants, posting social media photos showing some of the 20 bullet holes in and near the front door. Pérez originally planned to resign December 6, ahead of the end of his term December 31, but opted not to do so.

The 2024 race was close and contested in court. Though Cruz was proclaimed the winner by the IEEM after a canvass, the PAN and PRD challenged the election on grounds that Pérez Cruz had falsely claimed that his opponent, Rodríguez Hurtado, had been behind the murder of a municipal official. Rafael Fuentes, a judge of the Electoral Tribunal of the Federal Judiciary (TEPJF), proposed voiding the election on the grounds that the personal attack—days before the poll, in the mandatory election silence period—had damaged the process. However, the court upheld the election, confirming Pérez Cruz as the new mayor.
