= Jasaji Fighting League =

Mixed martial arts promotion company

- Type: Private
- Industry: Mixed martial arts promotion
- Founded: 2011; 15 years ago
- Founder: Javier Alonso Sandoval
- Headquarters: Tlalnepantla de Baz, State of Mexico, Mexico

Jasaji Fighting League (JFL MMA) is a Mexican mixed martial arts promotion based in Tlalnepantla de Baz, State of Mexico.

== History ==
JFL MMA was founded in 2011 by martial artist Javier Alonso Sandoval, and the inaugural event was held on July 14 of that year at the Santa Fe Rodeo in Tlalnepantla de Baz.

In September 2016, it was confirmed that JFL and PX Sports (then PXTV) had agreed to a four-year broadcasting agreement, with broadcasts commencing with JFL 13 on 24 September of that year.

== Events ==
JFL MMA has hosted more than 90 uninterrupted events in its history, making it the promoter with the most events in the history of Mexican MMA. All events are held in the State of Mexico, the promotion's headquarters.

#	Event	Date	Venue	Location
93	JFL 57	August 15, 2026	Cortijo Miguel Ortas	Atizapán de Zaragoza, Mexico
92	JFL 56	July 18, 2026	Cortijo Miguel Ortas	Atizapán de Zaragoza, Mexico
91	JFL Fight Night 22	April 18, 2026	Cortijo Miguel Ortas	Atizapán de Zaragoza, Mexico
90	JFL 55	February 7, 2026	Cortijo Miguel Ortas	Atizapán de Zaragoza, Mexico
89	JFL 54	October 18, 2025	Cortijo Miguel Ortas	Atizapán de Zaragoza, Mexico
88	JFL Fight Night 20	September 27, 2025	Cortijo Miguel Ortas	Atizapán de Zaragoza, Mexico
87	JFL 53	July 19, 2025	Cortijo Miguel Ortas	Atizapán de Zaragoza, Mexico
86	JFL Fight Night 19	June 14, 2025	Cortijo Miguel Ortas	Atizapán de Zaragoza, Mexico
85	JFL 52	May 17, 2025	Cortijo Miguel Ortas	Atizapán de Zaragoza, Mexico
84	JFL Fight Night 18	April 19, 2025	Cortijo Miguel Ortas	Atizapán de Zaragoza, Mexico
83	JFL 51	March 22, 2025	Cortijo Miguel Ortas	Atizapán de Zaragoza, Mexico
82	JFL Fight Night 17	February 22, 2025	Cortijo Miguel Ortas	Atizapán de Zaragoza, Mexico
81	JFL Fight Night 16	December 7, 2024	Cortijo Miguel Ortas	Atizapán de Zaragoza, Mexico
80	JFL 50	November 16, 2024	Cortijo Miguel Ortas	Atizapán de Zaragoza, Mexico
79	JFL 49	October 19, 2024	Cortijo Miguel Ortas	Atizapán de Zaragoza, Mexico
78	JFL Fight Night 15	September 21, 2024	Cortijo Miguel Ortas	Atizapán de Zaragoza, Mexico
77	JFL 48	August 31, 2024	Cortijo Miguel Ortas	Atizapán de Zaragoza, Mexico
76	JFL Fight Night 14	July 20, 2024	Cortijo Miguel Ortas	Atizapán de Zaragoza, Mexico
75	JFL 47	June 15, 2024	Cortijo Miguel Ortas	Atizapán de Zaragoza, Mexico
74	JFL 46	May 18, 2024	Cortijo Miguel Ortas	Atizapán de Zaragoza, Mexico
73	JFL Fight Night 13	April 27, 2024	Cortijo Miguel Ortas	Atizapán de Zaragoza, Mexico
72	JFL 45	March 9, 2024	Cortijo Miguel Ortas	Atizapán de Zaragoza, Mexico
71	JFL Fight Night 12	February 16, 2024	Cortijo Miguel Ortas	Atizapán de Zaragoza, Mexico
70	JFL 44	January 20, 2024	Cortijo Miguel Ortas	Atizapán de Zaragoza, Mexico
69	JFL 43	December 2, 2023	Cortijo Miguel Ortas	Atizapán de Zaragoza, Mexico
68	JFL 42	October 14, 2023	Cortijo Miguel Ortas	Atizapán de Zaragoza, Mexico
67	JFL 41	September 2, 2023	Cortijo Miguel Ortas	Atizapán de Zaragoza, Mexico
66	JFL 40	July 15, 2023	Cortijo Miguel Ortas	Atizapán de Zaragoza, Mexico
65	JFL 39	June 3, 2023	Cortijo Miguel Ortas	Atizapán de Zaragoza, Mexico
64	JFL 38	April 15, 2023	Cortijo Miguel Ortas	Atizapán de Zaragoza, Mexico
63	JFL 37	March 4, 2023	Cortijo Miguel Ortas	Atizapán de Zaragoza, Mexico
62	JFL 36	January 23, 2023	Cortijo Miguel Ortas	Atizapán de Zaragoza, Mexico
61	JFL 35	November 19, 2022	Cortijo Miguel Ortas	Atizapán de Zaragoza, Mexico
60	JFL 34	October 1, 2022	Cortijo Miguel Ortas	Atizapán de Zaragoza, Mexico
59	JFL 33	August 20, 2022	Cortijo Miguel Ortas	Atizapán de Zaragoza, Mexico
58	JFL 32	July 16, 2022	Cortijo Miguel Ortas	Atizapán de Zaragoza, Mexico
57	JFL 31	May 21, 2022	Cortijo Miguel Ortas	Atizapán de Zaragoza, Mexico
56	JFL 30	March 12, 2022	Cortijo Miguel Ortas	Atizapán de Zaragoza, Mexico
55	JFL 29	January 29, 2022		State of Mexico, Mexico
54	JFL 28	November 27, 2021		State of Mexico, Mexico
53	JFL 27	October 21, 2021	Cortijo Miguel Ortas	Atizapán de Zaragoza, Mexico
52	JFL 26	August 28, 2021	Cortijo Miguel Ortas	Atizapán de Zaragoza, Mexico
51	JFL: Inter Clubes	August 14, 2021	Cortijo Miguel Ortas	Atizapán de Zaragoza, Mexico
50	JFL 25	July 21, 2021	Cortijo Miguel Ortas	Atizapán de Zaragoza, Mexico
49	JFL 24	May 29, 2021		State of Mexico, Mexico
48	JFL 23	March 27, 2021	Centro de Espéctaculo Atizapán	Atizapán de Zaragoza, Mexico
47	JFL 22	March 6, 2021	Centro de Espéctaculo Atizapán	Atizapán de Zaragoza, Mexico
46	JFL Fight Night 11	November 14, 2020	Centro de Espéctaculo Atizapán	Atizapán de Zaragoza, Mexico
45	JFL Fight Night 10	January 25, 2020	Rodeo Santa Fe	Tlalnepantla de Baz, Mexico
44	JFL Fight Night 9	November 23, 2019	Rodeo Santa Fe	Tlalnepantla de Baz, Mexico
43	JFL 135 Pound Grand Prix	September 28, 2019	Rodeo Santa Fe	Tlalnepantla de Baz, Mexico
42	JFL Grand Prix	July 20, 2019	Rodeo Santa Fe	Tlalnepantla de Baz, Mexico
41	JFL Fight Night 8	May 25, 2019	Rodeo Santa Fe	Tlalnepantla de Baz, Mexico
40	JFL Grand Prix	March 23, 2019	Rodeo Santa Fe	Tlalnepantla de Baz, Mexico
39	JFL Fight Night 7	January 26, 2019	Rodeo Santa Fe	Tlalnepantla de Baz, Mexico
38	JFL Fight Night 6	November 17, 2018	Rodeo Santa Fe	Tlalnepantla de Baz, Mexico
37	JFL 20	September 8, 2018	Rodeo Santa Fe	Tlalnepantla de Baz, Mexico
36	JFL Fight Night 5	July 31, 2018	Rodeo Santa Fe	Tlalnepantla de Baz, Mexico
35	JFL 19	May 26, 2018	Rodeo Santa Fe	Tlalnepantla de Baz, Mexico
34	JFL Fight Night 4	March 17, 2018	Rodeo Santa Fe	Tlalnepantla de Baz, Mexico
33	JFL 18	January 30, 2018	Rodeo Santa Fe	Tlalnepantla de Baz, Mexico
32	JFL Fight Night 3	October 28, 2017	Rodeo Santa Fe	Tlalnepantla de Baz, Mexico
31	JFL 17	August 23, 2017	Rodeo Santa Fe	Tlalnepantla de Baz, Mexico
30	JFL Fight Night 2	August 5, 2017	Rodeo Santa Fe	Tlalnepantla de Baz, Mexico
29	JFL 16	July 15, 2017	Rodeo Santa Fe	Tlalnepantla de Baz, Mexico
28	JFL Fight Night 1	May 27, 2017	Zircus Random Club	Tlalnepantla de Baz, Mexico
27	JFL 15	March 18, 2017	Rodeo Santa Fe	Tlalnepantla de Baz, Mexico
26	JFL 14	November 26, 2016	Rodeo Santa Fe	Tlalnepantla de Baz, Mexico
25	JFL 13	September 24, 2016	Rodeo Santa Fe	Tlalnepantla de Baz, Mexico
24	JFL 12	June 18, 2016	Rodeo Santa Fe	Tlalnepantla de Baz, Mexico
23	JFL: Inter Clubes	May 14, 2016	Gimnasio Érik Morales	Atizapán de Zaragoza, Mexico
22	JFL 11	March 19, 2016	Rodeo Santa Fe	Tlalnepantla de Baz, Mexico
21	JFL: Inter Clubes	February 27, 2016	Arena Zaragoza	Atizapán de Zaragoza, Mexico
20	JFL 10	November 28, 2015	Rodeo Santa Fe	Tlalnepantla de Baz, Mexico
19	JFL 9	September 26, 2015	Rodeo Santa Fe	Tlalnepantla de Baz, Mexico
18	JFL 8	June 27, 2015	Rodeo Santa Fe	Tlalnepantla de Baz, Mexico
17	JFL: Inter Clubes	May 30, 2015	Cortijo Miguel Ortas	Atizapán de Zaragoza, Mexico
16	JFL 7	March 28, 2015	Rodeo Santa Fe	Tlalnepantla de Baz, Mexico
15	JFL 6	August 30, 2014	Rodeo Santa Fe	Tlalnepantla de Baz, Mexico
14	JFL: Inter Clubes	June 28, 2014	Rodeo Santa Fe	Tlalnepantla de Baz, Mexico
13	JFL: Doble Campeonato	April 26, 2014	Rodeo Santa Fe	Tlalnepantla de Baz, Mexico
12	JFL: Inter Clubes	February 22, 2014	Rodeo Santa Fe	Tlalnepantla de Baz, Mexico
11	JFL: Mandril vs. Márquez	November 23, 2013	Rodeo Santa Fe	Tlalnepantla de Baz, Mexico
10	JFL: Inter Clubes	August 17, 2013	Rodeo Santa Fe	Tlalnepantla de Baz, Mexico
9	JFL 3	July 4, 2013	Rodeo Santa Fe	Tlalnepantla de Baz, Mexico
8	JFL: Inter Clubes	March 23, 2013	Rodeo Santa Fe	Tlalnepantla de Baz, Mexico
7	JFL 2	November 29, 2012	Rodeo Santa Fe	Tlalnepantla de Baz, Mexico
6	JFL: Inter Clubes	September 12, 2012	Rodeo Santa Fe	Tlalnepantla de Baz, Mexico
5	JFL: 6° Aniversario	June 29, 2012	Rodeo Santa Fe	Tlalnepantla de Baz, Mexico
4	JFL: Inter Clubes	March 31, 2012	Rodeo Santa Fe	Tlalnepantla de Baz, Mexico
3	JFL 1	December 1, 2011	Rodeo Santa Fe	Tlalnepantla de Baz, Mexico
2	JFL: Team vs. Team	November 5, 2011	Cortijo Miguel Ortas	Atizapán de Zaragoza, Mexico
1	JFL: 5° Aniversario	July 14, 2011	Rodeo Santa Fe	Tlalnepantla de Baz, Mexico
