= Mario Enrique del Toro =

Mexican politician (1966–2024)

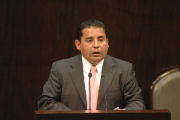
- Born: 18 August 1966; Apatzingán, Michoacán, Mexico
- Died: 7 October 2024 (aged 58)
- Occupation: Politician
- Political party: PRD

Mario Enrique del Toro (18 August 1966 – 7 October 2024) was a Mexican politician. At different times he was affiliated with the Institutional Revolutionary Party (PRI), the National Action Party (PAN) and the Party of the Democratic Revolution (PRD).

He was elected to the Congress of the State of Mexico for the PAN in 2000, but switched allegiance to the PRD during his term in office.

In the 2006 general election he was elected to the Chamber of Deputies to represent the State of Mexico's 19th district during the 60th session of Congress for the PRD.

Del Toro died on 7 October 2024.
