= Norma Ponce Orozco =

Mexican politician

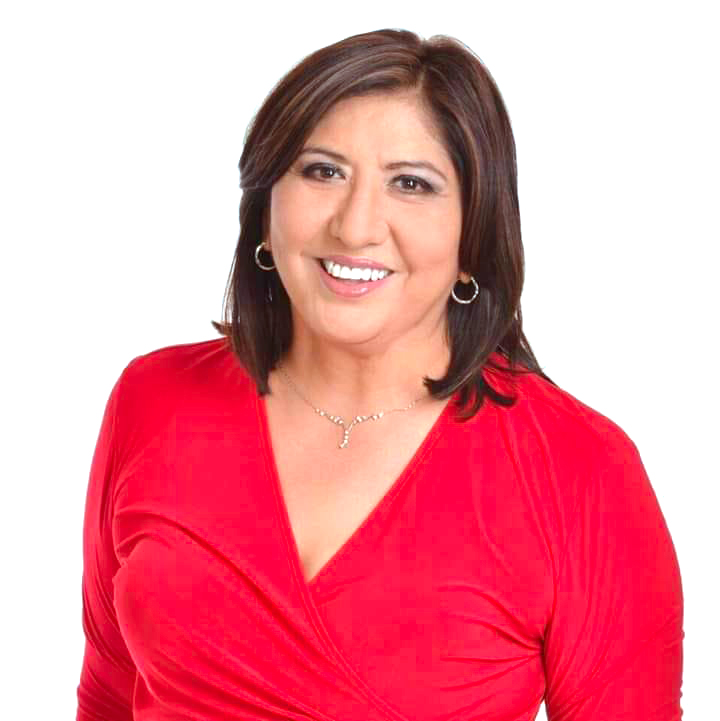
- Born: 1 October 1964 (age 61); State of Mexico, Mexico
- Occupation: Politician
- Political party: PRI

Norma Ponce Orozco (born 1 October 1964) is a Mexican politician affiliated with the Institutional Revolutionary Party (PRI). In the 2012 general election she was elected to the Chamber of Deputies to represent the State of Mexico's 16th district during the 62nd session of Congress.
