= Eduardo Pareyón Moreno =

Mexican architect and archaeologist

Eduardo Luis Pareyón Moreno (December 2, 1921 – March 15, 2000) was a Mexican architect and archaeologist. He was a pioneer researcher in several aspects of modern Mexican archaeology. He was born (and died) in Azcapotzalco, Federal District, to a family renowned for its contributions to the humanities and sciences.

== Education ==
He studied architecture at the National Autonomous University of Mexico and started a brilliant career assisting architect Mario Pani during projects as the new National Conservatory of Music (Mexico) and the Latinoamericana Tower, both in Mexico City. However, he soon get interested with archaeologic excavations, due to the rich history of the soil in many areas where he was working as architect. Another element that influenced his first studies as archaeologist was that during his childhood he spent many days exploring the old ruins of Teotihuacan, years before its reconstruction. Actually, Pareyón Moreno's father, colonel Eduardo Pareyón Azpeitia, was a friend of Manuel Gamio, whose work and personality had an impact during his first cultural development.

He returned to study at the National School of Anthropology, where he completed his master dissertation "Excavations at the archaeologic zone of Cerro del Tepalcate" (1961).

== Career ==
From 1955 to 1959 was assistant of Alfonso Caso during excavation and register works in archaeological sites in Quiotepec, Tecomavaca, Los Cues, and Cuicatlán, Oaxaca.

In 1959 was named director of the Museum of Popular Arts at Pátzcuaro, Michoacán.

Around 1960 Pareyon was exploring and mapping archaeological sites in the low basin of the Balsas River, at El Infiernillo Dam. In 1961-62 he conducted the reconstruction of the Tenayuca pyramid superposition 6, and was exploring Huejotla, Texcoco archaeological site. In 1964 the INAH assigns him the whole reconstruction of Santa Cecilia Acatitla ruins, Estado de México.

In 1970 he was named Chief of Archaeological Sites Maintenance of INAH. During the same year he moved to Palenque, with the task of developing the studies on the unknown surroundings of the site. In 1972 he conducted consolidation works at Tulum ruins, and in 1973 he developed the project for the Archaeological Museum of Tlapacoya, Estado de México. During 1975 was in charge of developing excavations and reconstructive tasks in Calixtlahuaca, and later in Tepetlaoztoc (1978), and in Ex-Convent of Churubusco (1980–81).

== Achievements ==
His most important contributions to Mexican archaeology were the recovering of the ruins of Santa Cecilia Acatitlan and the studies about the yacatas structures in the Michoacán area of Tzintzuntzan. He also initiated the archaeological works showing the mural paintings of the Cholula pyramid in Puebla.

He taught history of Mexican art and architecture during 35 years, at the National School of Anthropology and the National Academy of San Carlos, in Mexico City.

He was accepted to the Membership of the Society for American Archaeology, 1962.[2]

== Published works ==
- (1952) [with R. Pina Chan and A. Romano Pacheco] "Tlatilco: nuevo sitio preclasico del Valle de Mexico". vol. 1, nos. 3-4, pp. 9–14.
- (1957) "Exploraciones Arqueológicas en la Ciudad Vieja de Quiotepec, Oaxaca". VII Mesa Redonda Sociedad Mexicana de Antropología. Ms. (IWO).
- (1960) "Exploraciones Arqueológicas en Ciudad Vieja de Quiotepec, Oaxaca". RMEA vol. 16. (IWO).
- (1961) "Excavaciones en la zona arqueológica del Cerro del Tepalcate, San Rafael Champa, Estado de México", ENAH, Maestría en Arqueología, 141 pp.
- (1968) "Arquitectura de México; los mexicas", Revista CAM-SAM, vol. 1, no. 1; pp. 24–26.
- (1972) "Las pirámides de doble escalera". In Religión en Mesoamérica. XII Mesa Redonda, Sociedad Mexicana de Antropología, edited by Jaime Litvak King, and Noemí Castillo Tejero, pp. 117–126. Sociedad Mexicana de Antropología, Mexico City.
- (1988) "Objetos maqueados". In La Garrafa: Cuevas de La Garrafa, Chiapas: estudio y conservación de algunos objetos arqueológicos, edited by María Elena Landa et al. Gobierno del Estado de Puebla and Centro Regional de Puebla, Instituto Nacional de Antropología e Historia, Puebla; pp. 183–209.

== Notes ==
[2] "Back Matter", American Antiquity, Vol. 28, No. 3 (Jan., 1963), p. 432. Published by: Society for American Archaeology
