= José Luis Soto Oseguera =

Mexican politician

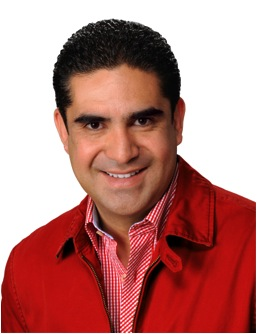
- Born: 26 September 1974 (age 51); Ecatepec de Morelos, State of Mexico, Mexico
- Occupation: Politician
- Political party: PRI

José Luis Soto Oseguera (born 26 September 1974) is a Mexican politician from the Institutional Revolutionary Party (PRI). In the 2009 mid-terms he was elected to the Chamber of Deputies to represent the State of Mexico's 16th district during the 61st session of Congress.
