= Santa Cecilia Acatitlán =

Archaeological site in Mexico

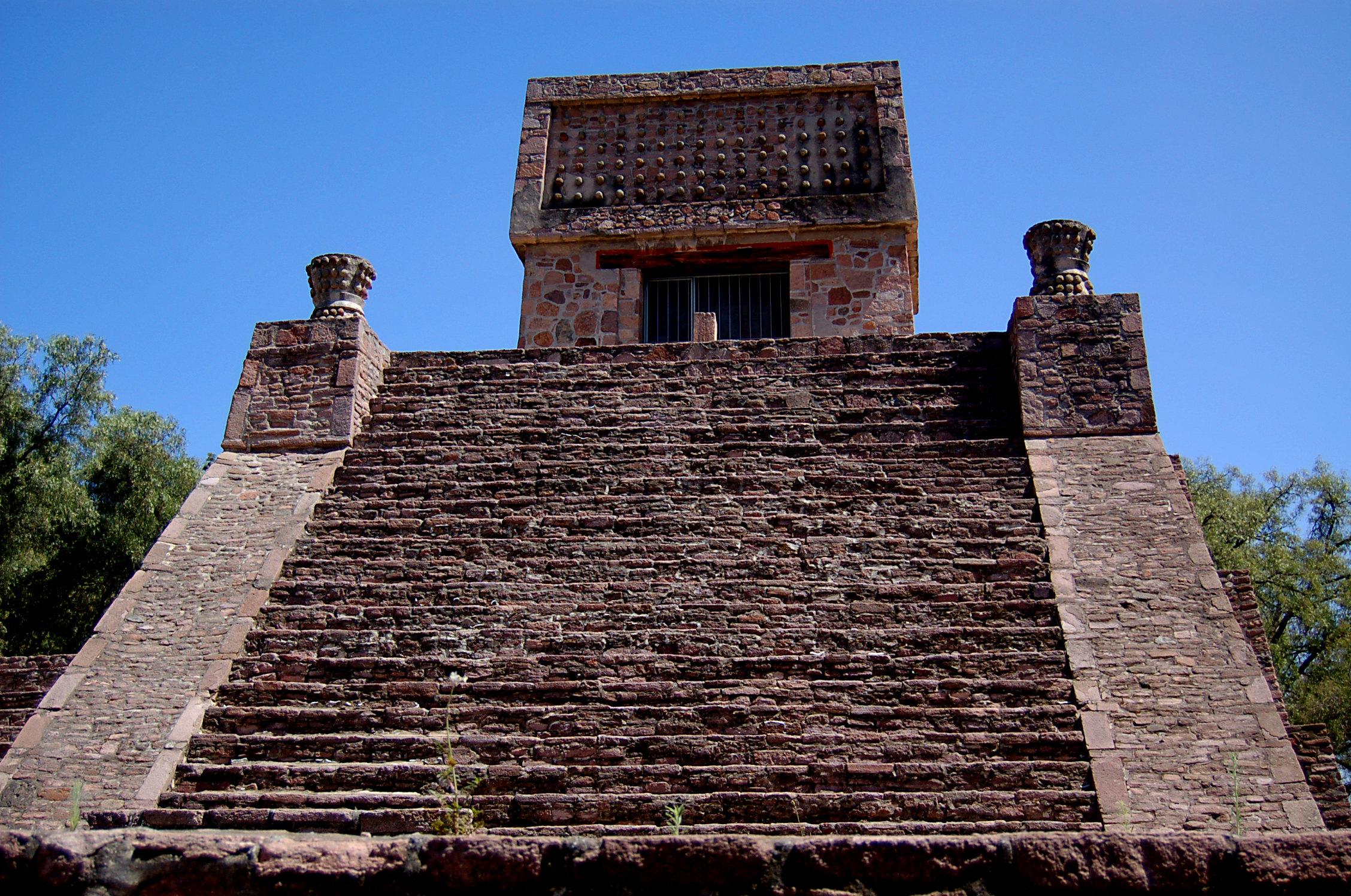
- Main staircase of the pyramid
- Interactive map of Santa Cecilia Acatitlán
- 19°33′09.30″N 99°10′24″W
- Periods: Late Postclassic
- Cultures: Chichimeca
- Location: Tlalnepantla de Baz

Santa Cecilia Acatitlán (Spanish pronunciation: [santa seˈsilja akatiˈtlan]; Nahuatl: "place among the reeds") is an archeological zone of the early Aztec (or early Toltec) culture located in the town of Santa Cecilia, in the municipality of Tlalnepantla de Baz in the State of Mexico, about 10 km (6 1/5 miles) northwest of Mexico City. In pre-Columbian times, it was located on the northwest shore of the great Lake Texcoco.

== Foundation ==
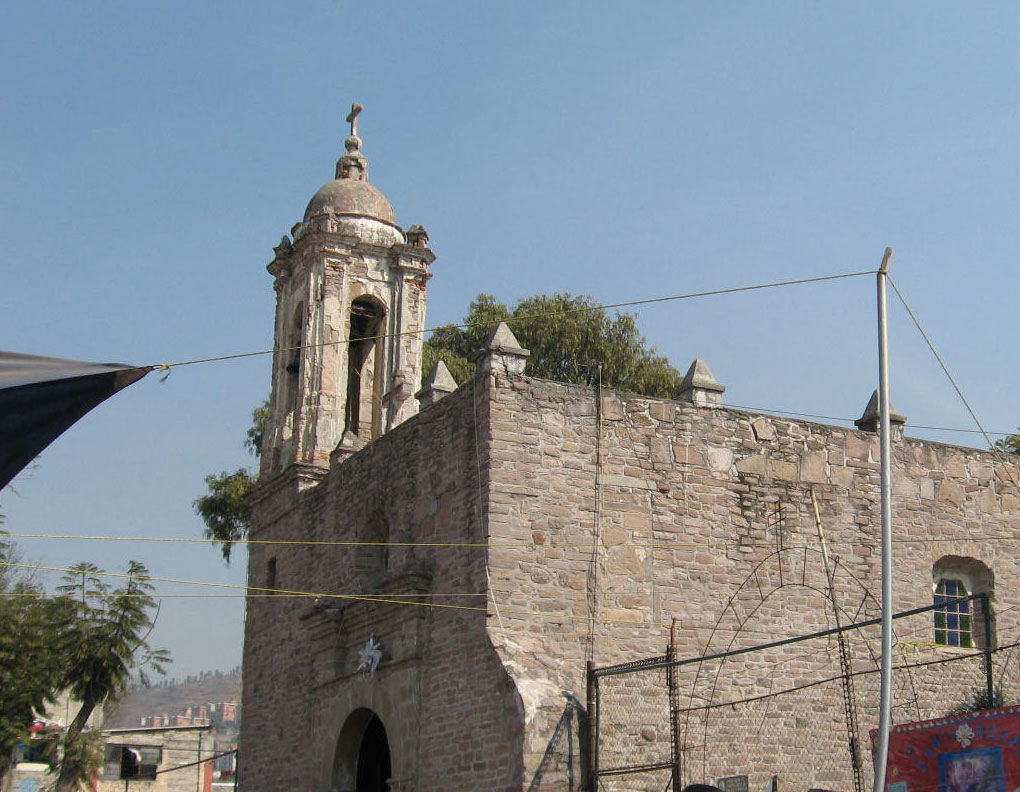
Parish of Santa Cecelia Acatitlán built partially with materials from the destroyed pyramid.

This settlement was associated with Tenayuca, the political and religious center of the time; the two sites are about 3 km (2 miles) apart. Along with Tenayuca, it was later annexed by the Mexica and became part of the lacustrine culture of the Valley of Mexico under the rule of Tenochtitlan, until the arrival of the conquistadors in 1521. After the conquest of Mexico, Acatitlan began to decline, and the city, like many other Mesoamerican structures, was dismantled, its stone forming the basis of the new city's churches, houses, and monuments.

== Archaeological site ==
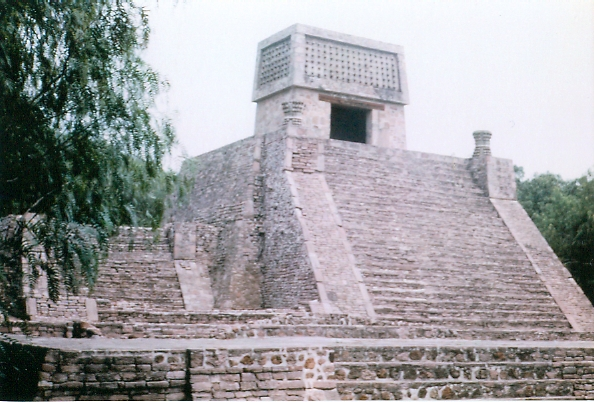
The pyramid

Only one quadrangular basement currently survives, which might have been one of the site's main structures. It consists of a large staircase leading up to a temple. Like Tenayuca, it is thought that the temple was dedicated to the worship of Huitzilopochtli and Tlaloc. The construction method was probably the characteristic one of successive structures, one on top of the other, and at least four successive time periods have been detected. Today, the inside of the pyramid is one of the best preserved interior structures. The exterior structures were removed and many of their stones were used to build the adjacent church, which dates back to the late 16th century. In 1962, the architect and archaeologist Eduardo Pareyon Moreno reconstructed and reinforced the pyramid's basement and rebuilt the temple that crowns it. Although such a reconstruction certainly does not comply with current canons of archaeology, the product is a beautifully delineated Mexica pyramid, one of the best-conserved examples of this culture.

== Museum ==
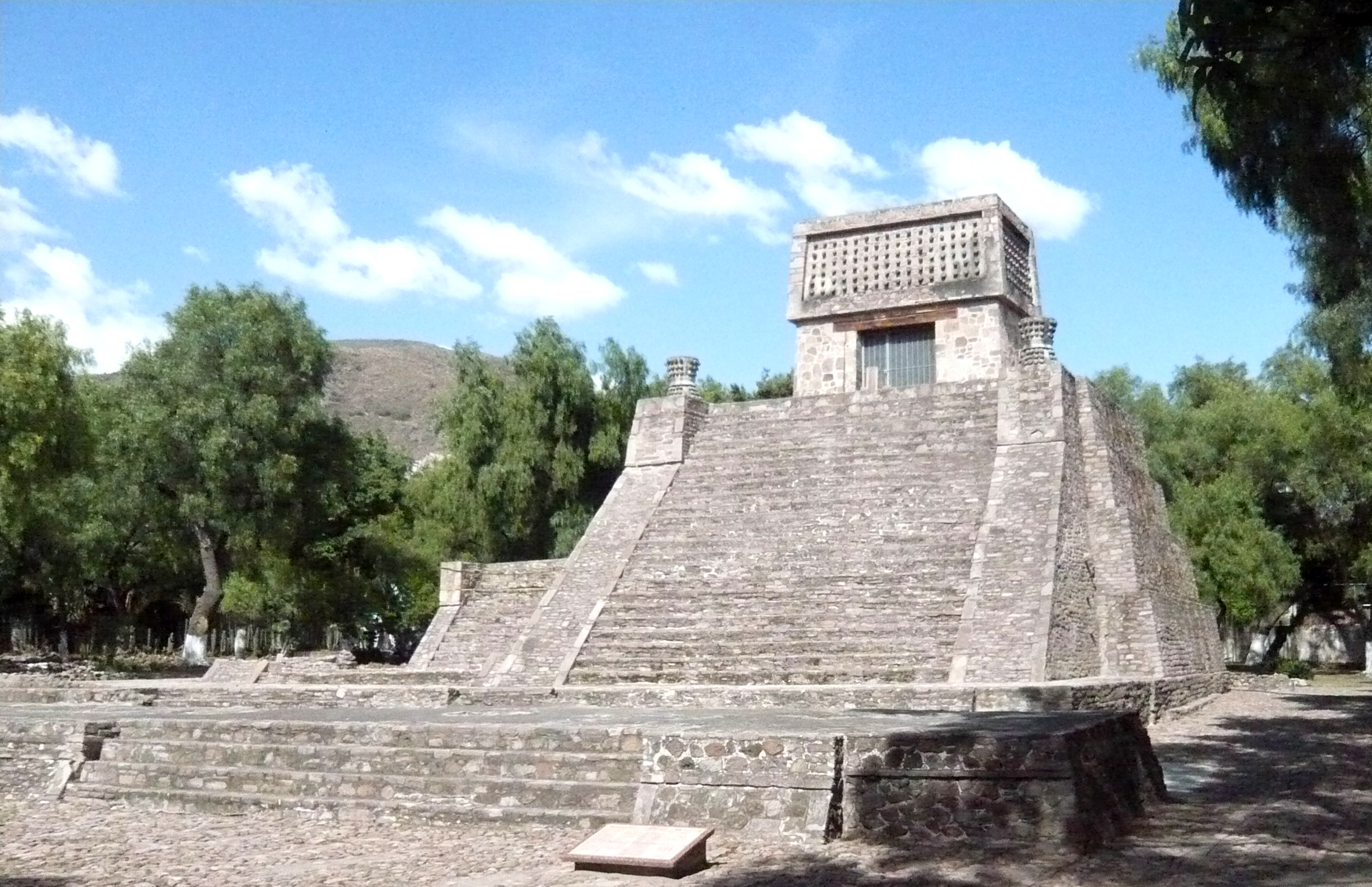
Santa Cecilia Acatitlán pyramid, looking north

Inaugurated in 1961, INAH operates an on site museum called the Eusebio Davalos Hurtado Museum of Mexica Sculpture. Eusebio Dávalos an archaeologist and the owner of the pulque hacienda which was once adjacent to the site and which now houses the museum. Dávalos dedicated part of his life to collecting the artifacts now on display. His collection includes ceramic and stone materials from this and other sites in the Mexica zone of influence. The museum also exhibits a kitchen and living room in the style of the period before the Mexican Revolution. The museum is located on Calle Circuito Pirámide in Tlalnepantla.

== See also ==
- List of Mesoamerican pyramids
