= 16th federal electoral district of the State of Mexico =

Federal electoral district of Mexico

State of Mexico's 16th
- Electoral district of the Chamber of Deputies of Mexico

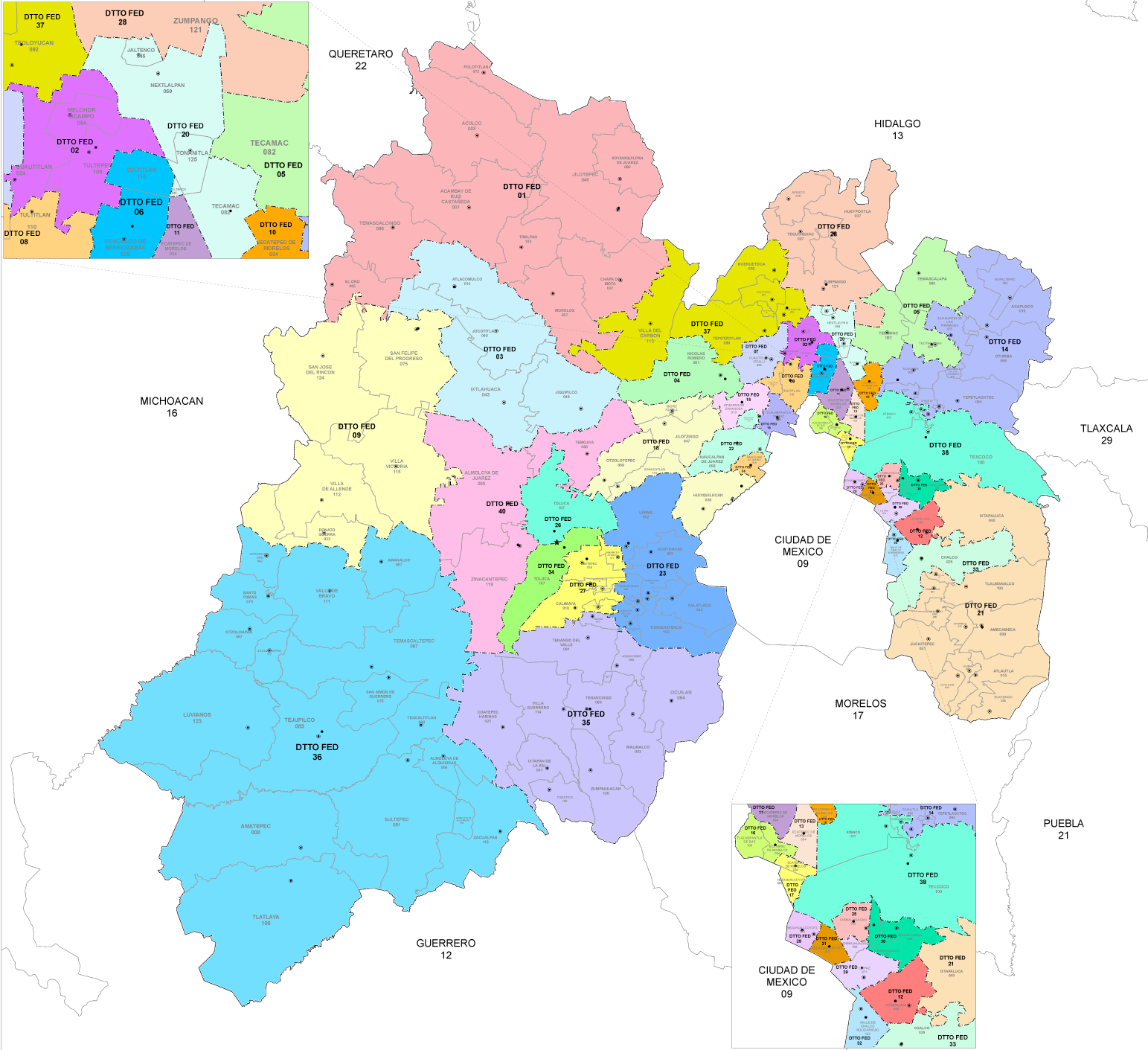
- State of Mexico's districts since 2023

Incumbent
- Member: Emilio Manzanilla Téllez
- Party: ▌Labour Party
- Congress: 66th (2024–2027)

District
- State: State of Mexico
- Head town: Ecatepec
- Coordinates: 19°37′N 99°03′W
- Covers: Ecatepec de Morelos (part), Tlalnepantla de Baz (part)
- PR region: Fifth
- Precincts: 174
- Population: 401,345 (2020 census)

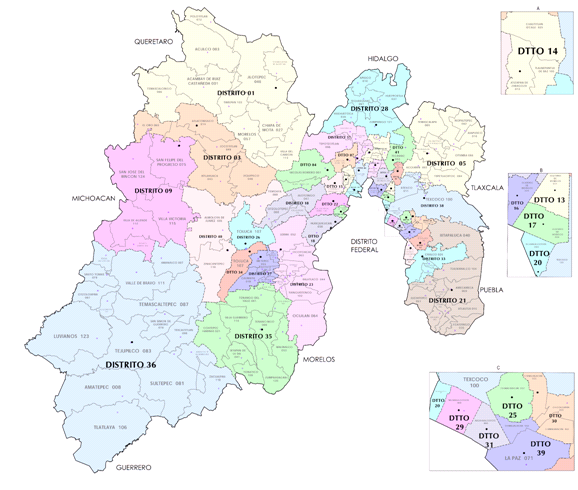
2017–2022 districting scheme

The 16th federal electoral district of the State of Mexico (Spanish: Distrito electoral federal 16 del Estado de México) is one of the 300 electoral districts into which Mexico is divided for elections to the federal Chamber of Deputies and one of 40 such districts in the State of Mexico.

It elects one deputy to the lower house of Congress for each three-year legislative session by means of the first-past-the-post system. Votes cast in the district also count towards the calculation of proportional representation ("plurinominal") deputies elected from the fifth region.

Suspended in 1930, (Note: An amendment to Article 52 of the Constitution in 1928 changed the original provision of "one deputy per 60,000 inhabitants" to "one deputy per 100,000"; as a result, the size of the Chamber of Deputies fell from 281 in the 1928 election to 171 in 1934.) the 16th district was re-created by the 1977 electoral reforms, which increased the number of single-member seats in the Chamber of Deputies from 196 to 300. Under that plan, the State of Mexico's seat allocation rose from 15 to 34. The new districts were first contended in the 1979 mid-term election.

The current member for the district, elected in the 2024 general election, is Emilio Manzanilla Téllez of the Labour Party (PT).

== District territory ==
Under the 2023 districting plan adopted by the National Electoral Institute (INE), which is to be used for the 2024, 2027 and 2030 federal elections, the 16th district is located in the Greater Mexico City urban area, covering 174 electoral precincts (secciones electorales) across portions of two of the state's 125 municipalities:

- Ecatepec de Morelos (south-western portion) and Tlalnepantla de Baz (eastern exclave). (Note: The remainder of Ecatepec is covered by the 10th, 11th, 13th and 17th districts; the remainder of Tlalnepantla is covered by the 19th district.)

The head town (cabecera distrital), where results from individual polling stations are gathered together and tallied, is the city of Ecatepec. In the 2020 census, the district reported a total population of 401,345.

== Previous districting schemes ==
Evolution of electoral district numbers
	1974	1978	1996	2005	2017	2023
State of Mexico	15	34	36	40	41	40
Chamber of Deputies	196	300				

Under the previous districting plans enacted by the INE and its predecessors, the 16th district was situated as follows:

2017–2022

Central and south-western parts of Ecatepec and Tlalnepantla's eastern exclave. The head town was at Ecatepec.

2005–2017

Western parts of Ecatepec and Tlalnepantla's eastern exclave. The head town was at Ecatepec.

1996–2005

Western parts of Ecatepec and Tlalnepantla's eastern exclave.

1978–1996

A portion of the city of Toluca, the rural part of its surrounding municipality, and the municipality of Metepec, with its head town at Toluca.

== Deputies returned to Congress ==
(Mexico) National parties
- Current
- PAN
- PRI
- PT
- PVEM
- MC
- Morena
- PAZ
- Somos
- Defunct or local only
- PLM
- PNR
- PRM
- PNM
- PP
- PPS
- PARM
- PFCRN
- CON
- PANAL
- PSD
- PES
- PES
- PRD

State of Mexico's 16th district
Election	Deputy	Party	Term	Legislature
1916	Rubén Martí		1916–1917	Constituent Congress of Querétaro
...
1979	Yolanda Sentíes Echeverría	Institutional Revolutionary Party	1979–1982	51st Congress
1982	Arturo Martínez Legorreta	Institutional Revolutionary Party	1982–1985	52nd Congress
1985	Enrique Tito González Isunza	Institutional Revolutionary Party	1985–1988	53rd Congress
1988	Alfredo Reyes Contreras	Popular Socialist Party (Mexico)	1988–1991	54th Congress
1991	Arturo Montiel Rojas	Institutional Revolutionary Party	1991–1994	55th Congress
1994	Agustín Mauro Jordán Arzate	Institutional Revolutionary Party	1994–1997	56th Congress
1997	José Janitzio Soto Elguera	Institutional Revolutionary Party	1997–2000	57th Congress
2000	Valdemar Romero Reyna	National Action Party (Mexico)	2000–2003	58th Congress
2003	Rubén Mendoza Ayala	National Action Party (Mexico)	2003–2006	59th Congress
2006	Raciel Pérez Cruz	Party of the Democratic Revolution	2006–2009	60th Congress
2009	José Luis Soto Oseguera	Institutional Revolutionary Party	2009–2012	61st Congress
2012	Norma Ponce Orozco	Institutional Revolutionary Party	2012–2015	62nd Congress
2015	María Isabel Maya Pineda	Institutional Revolutionary Party	2015–2018	63rd Congress
2018	Emilio Manzanilla Téllez	Labour Party (Mexico)	2018–2021	64th Congress
2021	Marisela Garduño Garduño	Labour Party (Mexico)	2021–2024	65th Congress
2024	Emilio Manzanilla Téllez	Labour Party (Mexico)	2024–2027	66th Congress

== Presidential elections ==
State of Mexico's 16th district
Election	District won by	Party or coalition	%
2018	Andrés Manuel López Obrador	Juntos Haremos Historia	59.8281
2024	Claudia Sheinbaum Pardo	Sigamos Haciendo Historia	67.0475
