= Tlalnepantla Region =

Region XII (Spanish: Región XII. Tlalnepantla) is an intrastate region within the State of Mexico.

== Geography ==
It is one of the 10 regions that comprise the Mexico City Metropolitan Area. It borders Mexico City to the north, and is part of the Greater Mexico City.

The region comprises two cities, both densely populated cities having very low margination, Tlalnepantla de Baz and Atizapan de Zaragoza.

=== Municipalities ===
Municipality	Area (km²) 2010	Population 2005 Census	Population 2010 Census	Population density (/km² 2010)
Tlalnepantla de Baz	83.5	683,808	664,225	7,954
Atizapan de Zaragoza	89.9	472,526	489,937	5,448
Region XII Tlalnepantla	173.4	1,156,334	1,164,162	6,654.7
