= Tlalnepantla Cathedral =

Coordinates: 19°32′16″N 99°11′38″W

Corpus Christi Cathedral
- Catedral de Corpus Christi
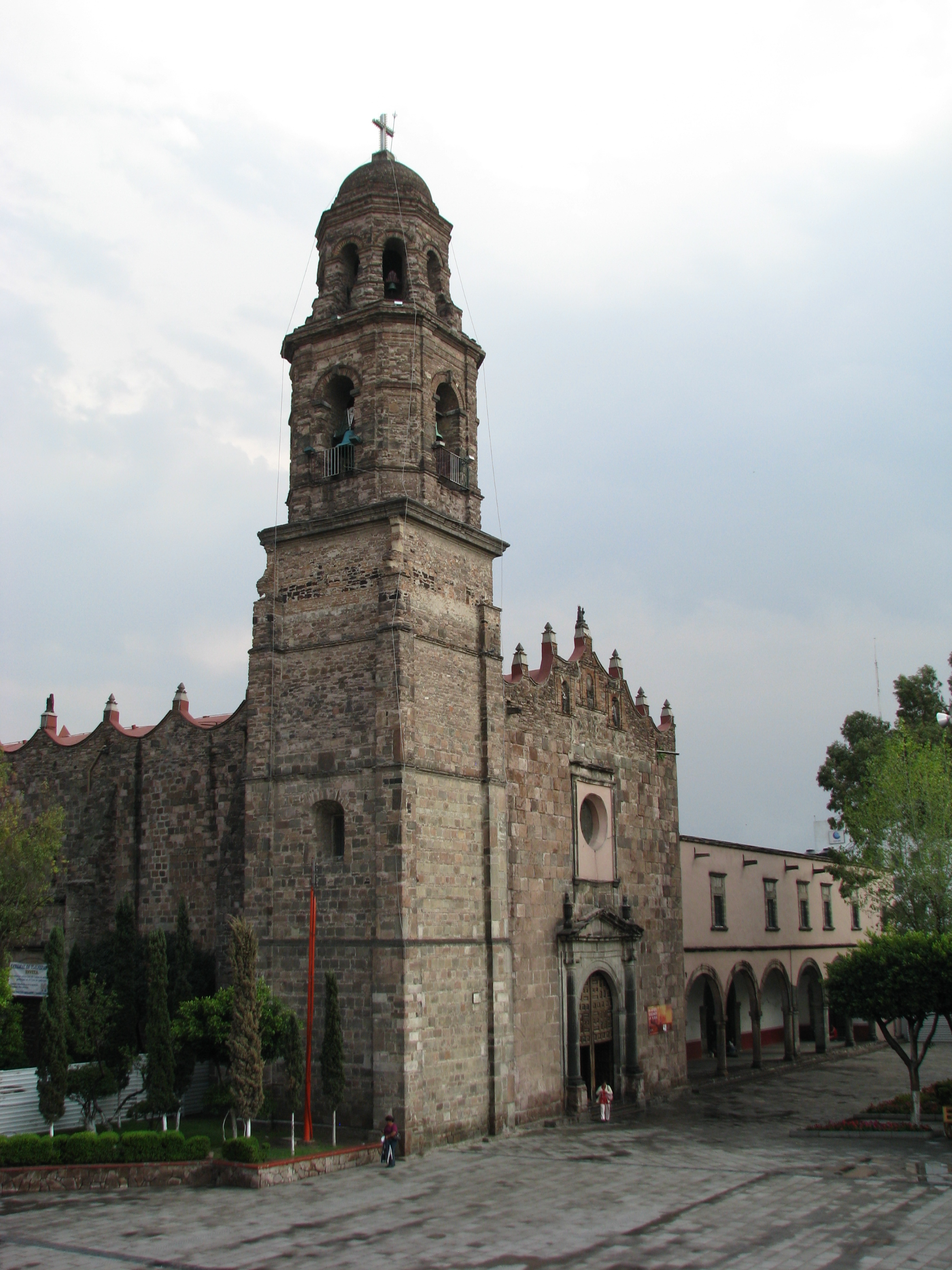
- Corpus Christi Cathedral
- Location: Tlalnepantla de Baz
- Country: Mexico
- Denomination: Roman Catholic Church

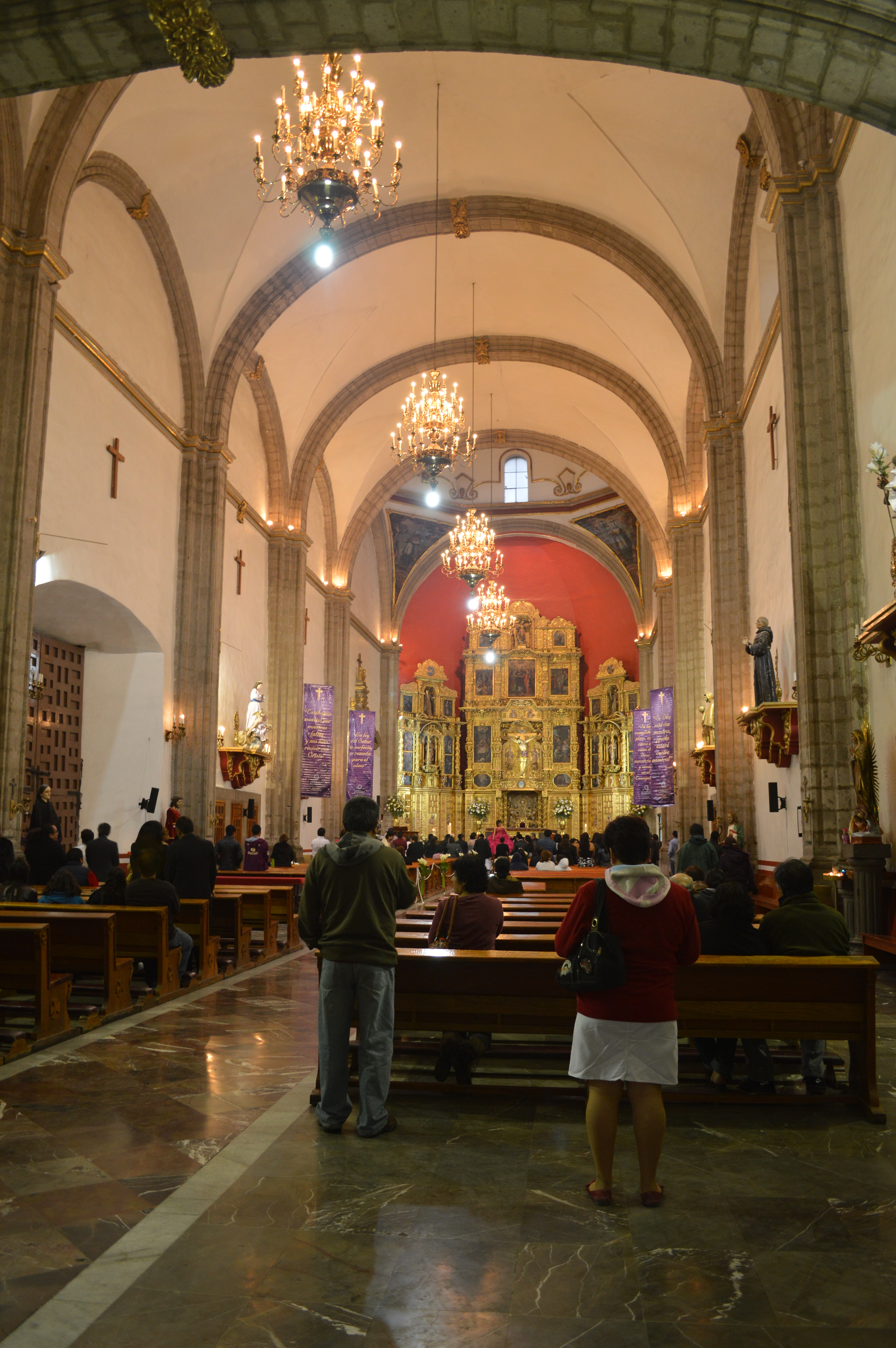
Internal view

The Corpus Christi Cathedral (Spanish: Catedral de Corpus Christi) also called Tlalnepantla Cathedral was consecrated on August 23, 1964, in Tlalnepantla de Baz, Mexico. Previously, the Convent of San Francisco was founded on the site, built by the Franciscan order in 1525. Subsequently, a flat-roofed temple with wooden beams began to be built, whose height was much lower than the current cathedral, and which was named Corpus Christi. After the fire of 1666, its structure and architecture were modified. During the earthquake in the early 20th century, the building suffered great damage, which made it necessary to carry out repairs that can be seen on the walls of the north side. Among some of the stones used for its erection, one can observe glyphs and fretwork from the indigenous and colonial periods.

== See also ==
- Roman Catholicism in Mexico
