= Tlalnepantla de Baz =

- Municipality
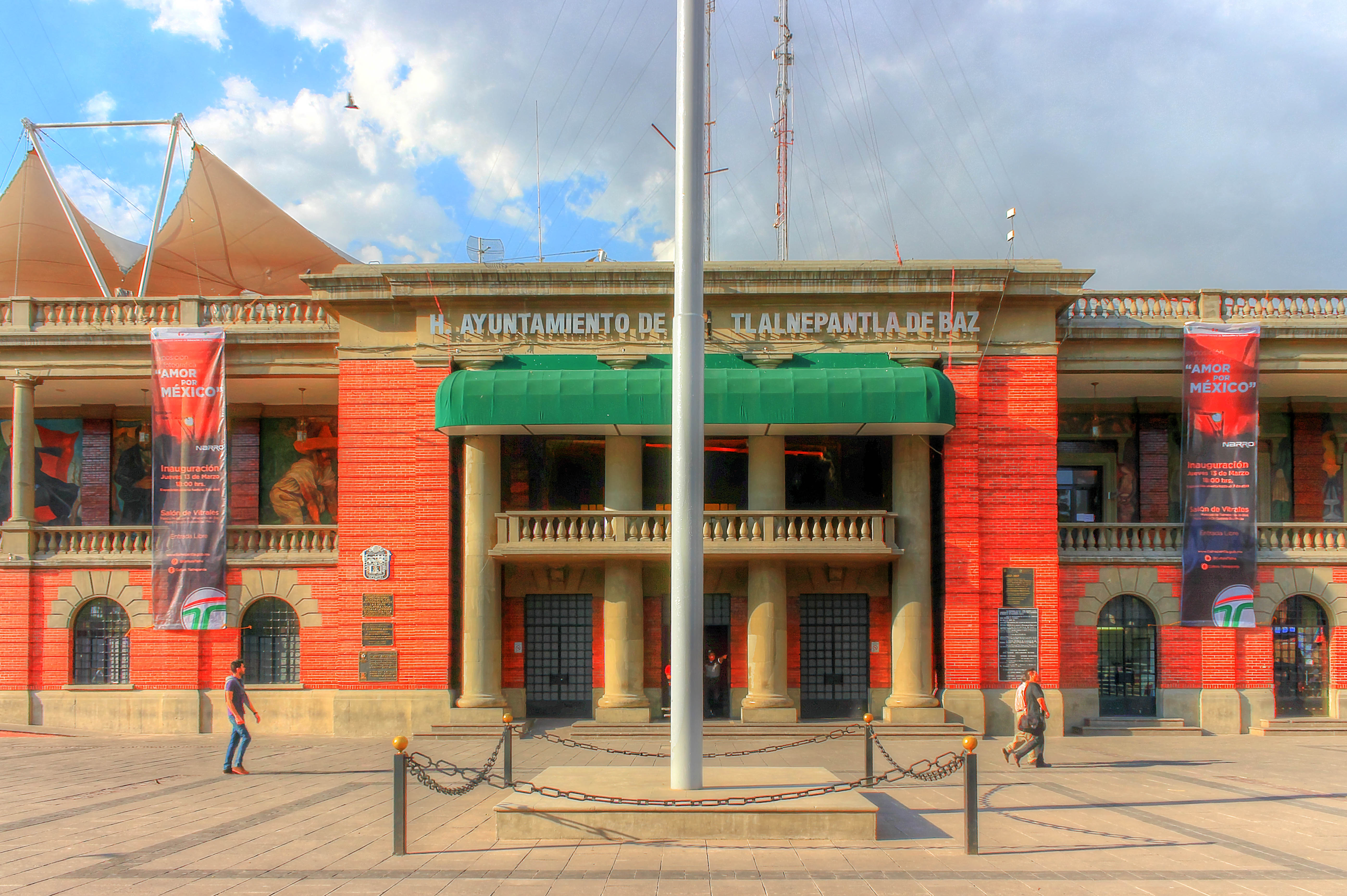
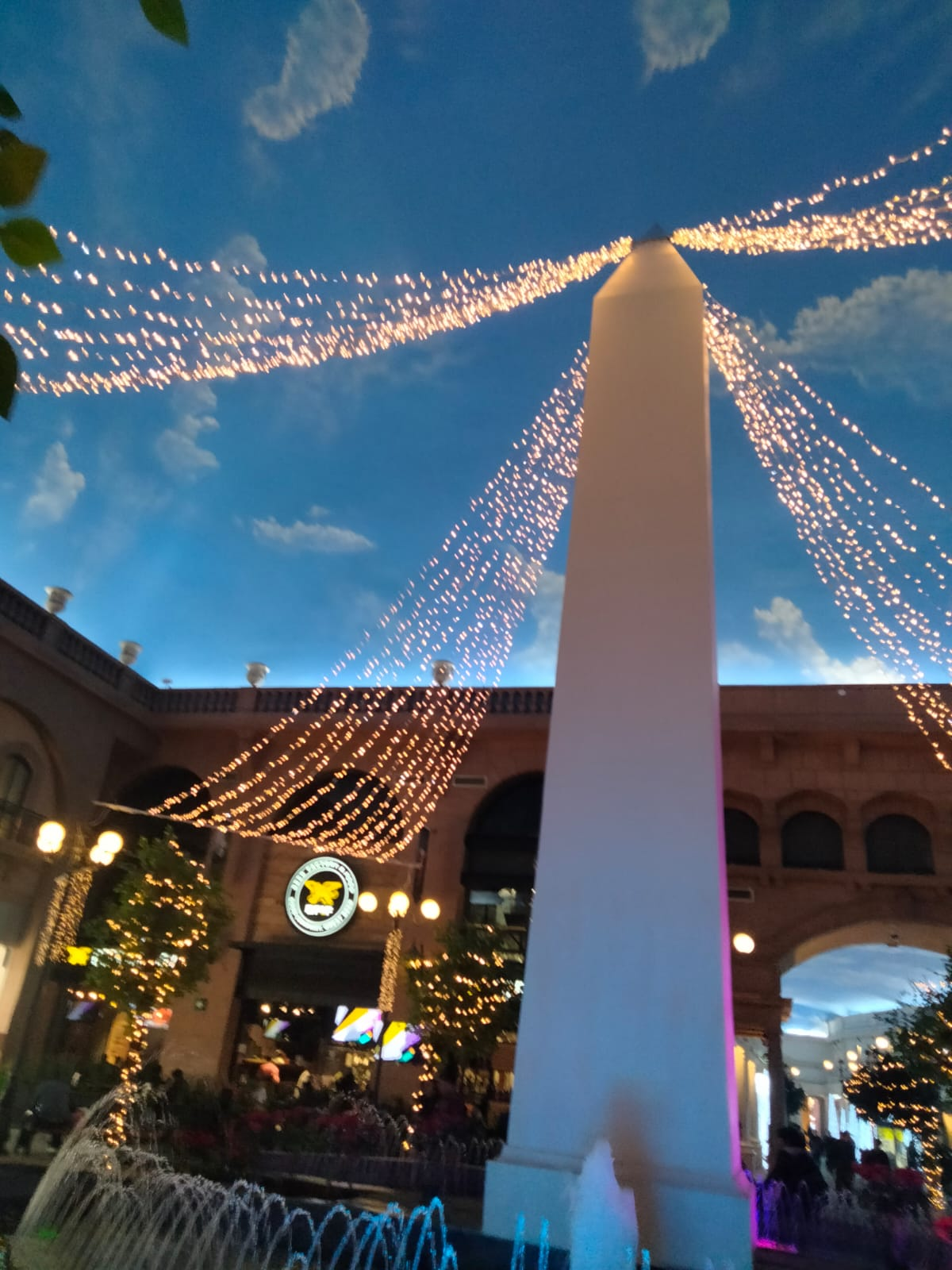
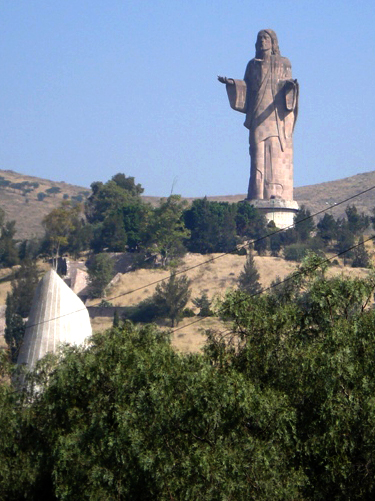
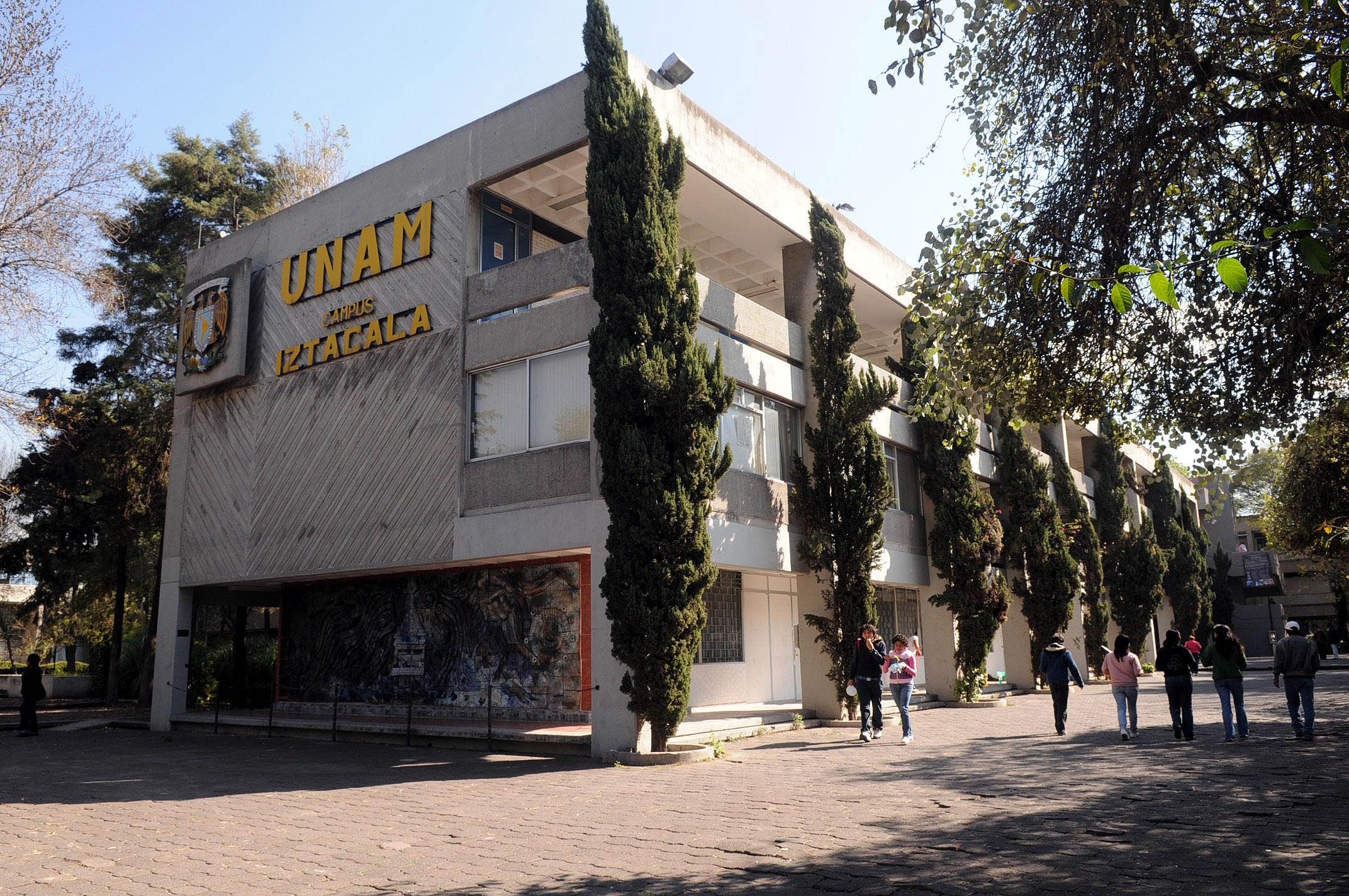
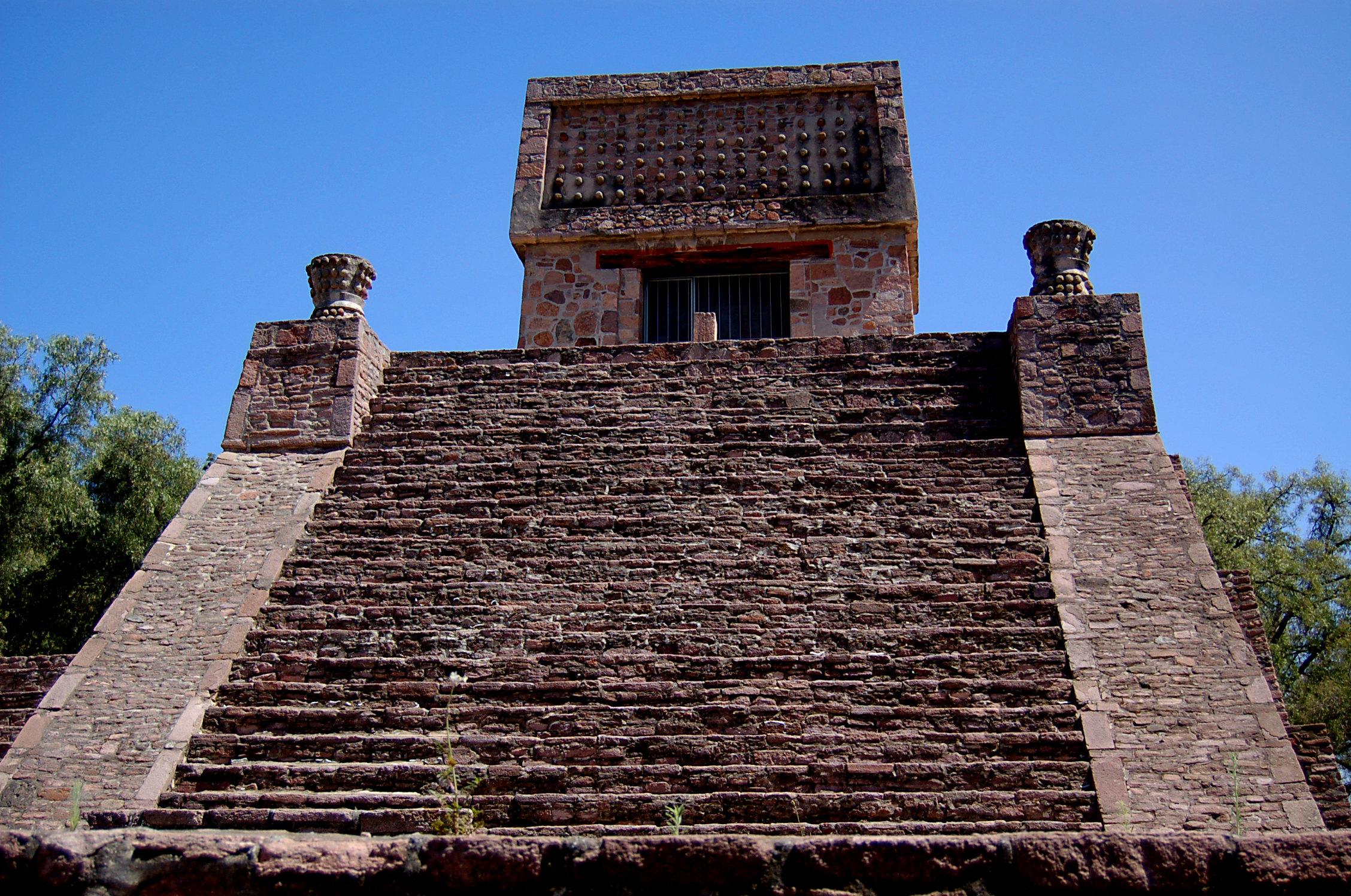
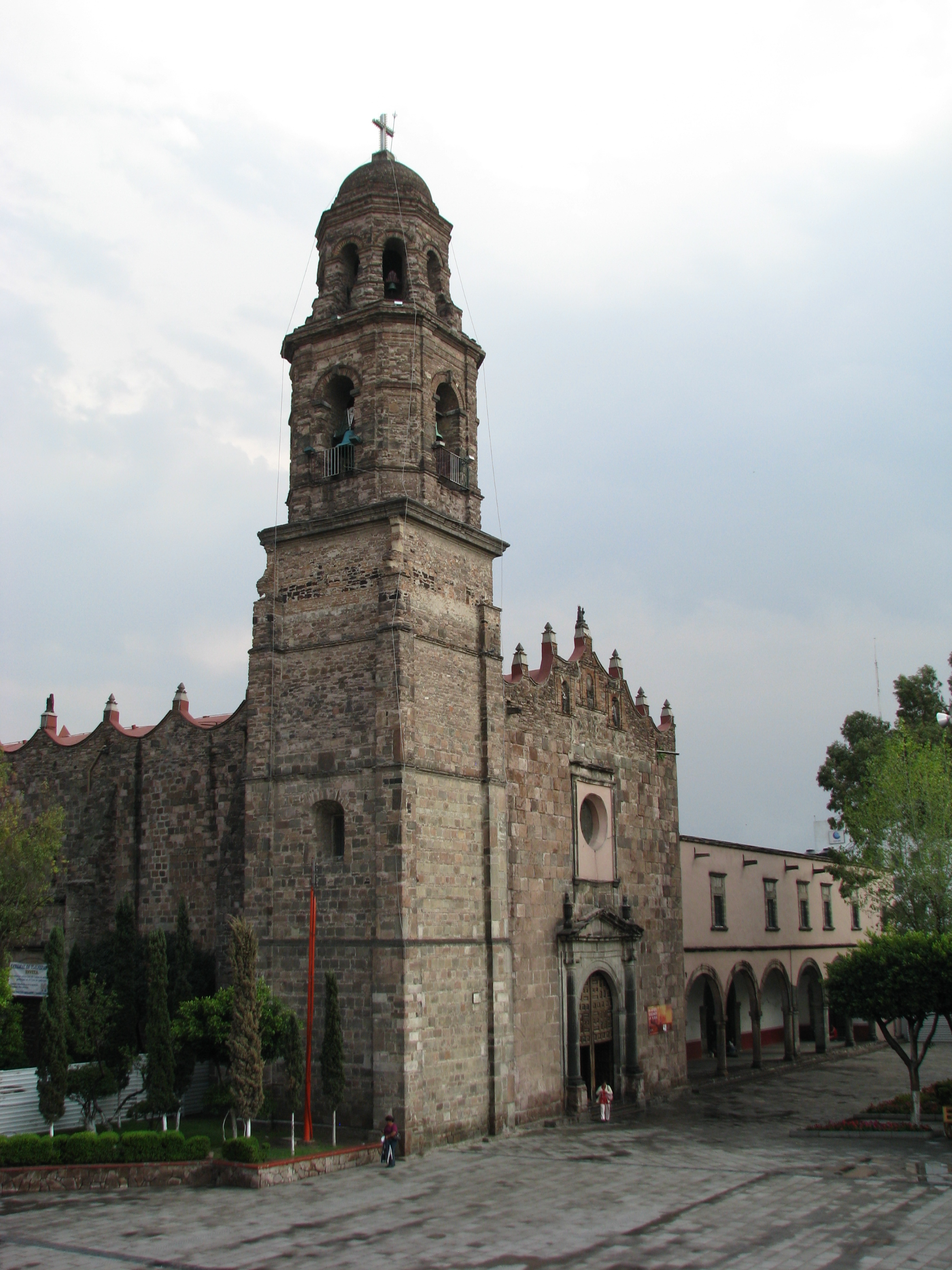
- Clockwise, from top: Municipal palace, Jardines del Recuerdo cemetery, Santa Cecilia Acatitlan, Corpus Christi Cathedral, FES Iztacala, Mundo E

- Coat of arms
- Nickname: Tlalne or Tlane
- Motto: Culture, Work and Progress
- Location of Tlalnepantla in the State of Mexico
- Coordinates: 19°32′12″N 99°11′41″W
- Country: Mexico
- State: State of Mexico
- Region: Tlalnepantla
- Metro area: Greater Mexico City
- Municipal Seat: Tlalnepantla

Government
  - Type: Ayuntamiento
  - Municipal President: Raciel Pérez Cruz

Area
  - Total: 83.48 km^{2} (32.23 sq mi)
  - Land: 77.17 km^{2} (29.80 sq mi)
  - Water: 1.10 km^{2} (0.42 sq mi)
- Elevation: 2,250 m (7,380 ft)

Population (2020)
  - Total: 672,202
  - Density: 8,711/km^{2} (22,560/sq mi)
- Time zone: UTC−06:00 (CST)
- Postal code (of seat): 54000
- Area code: 55
- Demonym: Tlalnepantlense
- Website: Official website (in Spanish)

Tlalnepantla de Baz (Otomi: Ndemhāi) is one of 125 municipalities of the state of Mexico, north of Mexico City. The municipal seat and largest city in the municipality is the city of Tlalnepantla. Tlalnepantla comes from the Náhuatl words tlalli (land) and nepantla (middle) to mean the middle land. The city was known in prior times as Tlalnepantla de Galeana and Tlalnepantla de Comonfort, to honor Hermenegildo Galeana and Ignacio Comonfort, respectively. The current addition of Baz comes from the last name of Gustavo Baz Prada, an important politician and soldier of Emiliano Zapata's army during the Mexican Revolution. After the Revolution, Baz Prada became Governor of the State of Mexico and President of the National Autonomous University of Mexico (UNAM). It is located in the northeastern part of the state of Mexico, in the Valley of Mexico north of Mexico City proper. Tlalnepantla de Baz has an exclave to the west, divided by Gustavo A. Madero. Together with Atizapán, it comprises the dense Region XII of Mexico State.

== History ==
Around the 11th century, a people called the Amaquemecan (after whom the municipality of Amecameca is named), migrated to this area following their leader Xolotl to look for a better climate and more food to sustain themselves. This same Xolotl founded the Tenayuca Oztopolco chiefdom and made the first census ever in the Americas. The Acolhuas, Tepanecas and Otomis were already established in this land so alliances were made. Despite this, the region was eventually conquered and made a tributary of the Aztec Empire. After the Spanish Conquest, the area was evangelized by the Franciscans. The founding of modern Tlalnepantla was the result of a dispute between the towns of Tenayuca and Teocalhueyacan as to which should be the site of Franciscan monastery and religious center for the area. The result was to place the monastery at the midpoint between these two towns, and hence the name (middle land). This monastery, named Corpus Christi was built in 1550. After independence, Tlalnepantla was originally part of Mexico City, but in 1825, it was recognized as a district of the State of Mexico. The municipality is divided almost entirely by Mexico City's Gustavo A. Madero delegation. During the presidency of Porfirio Díaz, Tlalnepantla began industrial development, and in the 1950s underwent a demographic explosion after being declared a city in 1948. The population as of the 2010 INEGI census was 653,410 people, representing 98.37% of municipal population.

On January 16, 1977, Tlalnepantla del Baz was the site of one of the worst railway disasters in Mexico's history when a bus driver attempted to cross a railroad ahead of an oncoming train. The driver was one of 42 people killed.

== Infrastructure ==
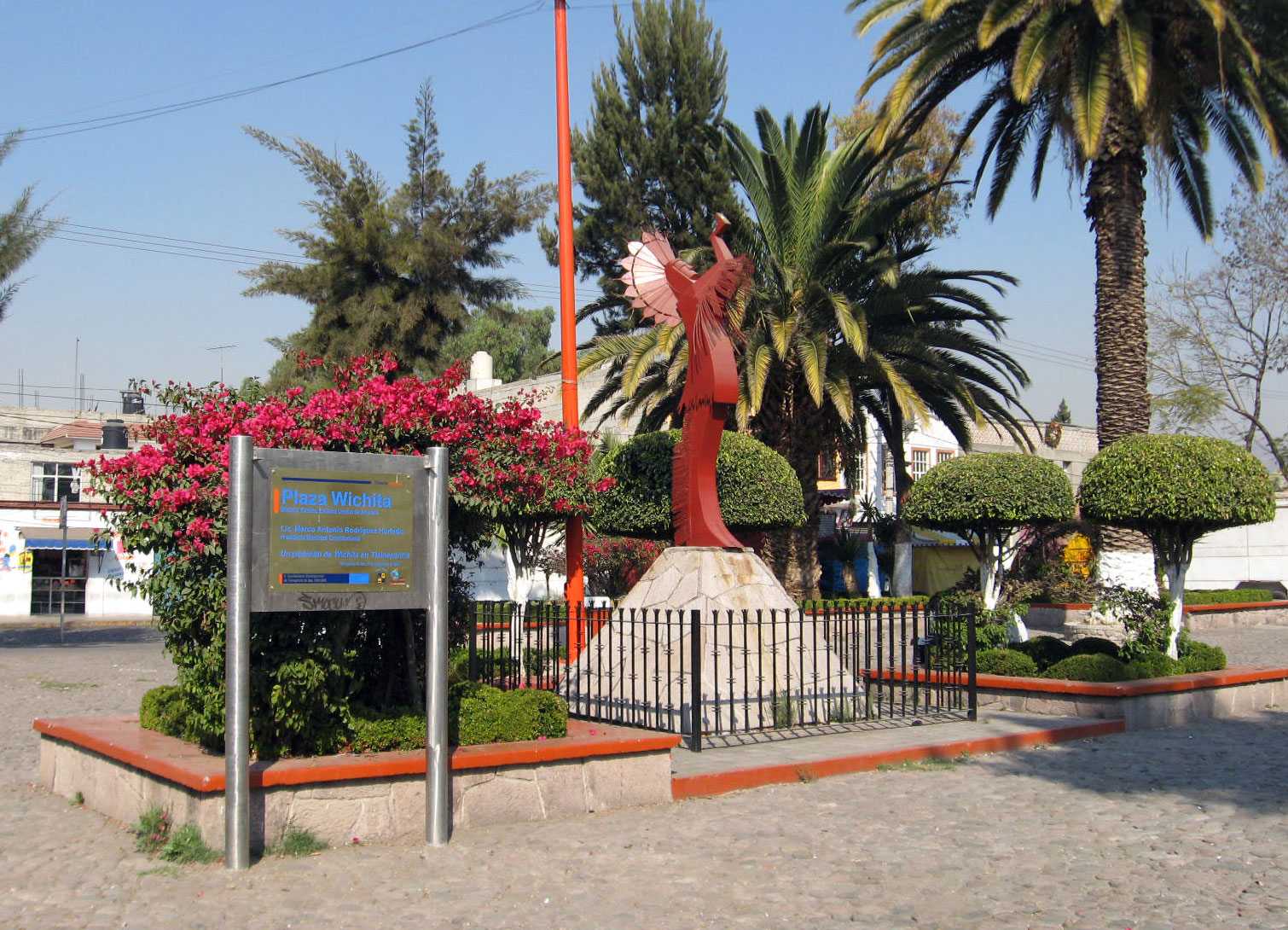
Plaza Wichita with replica of The Keeper of the Plains statue donated by Tlalnepantla's sister city Wichita, Kansas, United States.

Tlalnepantla is a large city with an important mall (Mundo E) and hotels.

The most important avenues and boulevards in Tlalnepantla City are:

- Gustavo Baz Ave.
- Mario Colin Ave.
- Adolfo Lopez Mateos Blvd.
- Presidente Juárez Ave.

As well as the Periférico and the Mexico-Querétaro Freeway with 15 lanes in Tlalnepantla. (This is a section of Mexican Federal Highway 57, part of the Pan-American Highway.)

Tlanepantla is served by the local pesero, the Mexibús system, an intercity bus network and the Tren Suburbano at Tlalnepantla and San Rafael stations. The Eastern area is served by the Mexicable service.

== Education ==
Schools located in the city include:

- UNAM, Facultad de Estudios Superiores Iztacala (FES Iztacala)
- National Autonomous University of Mexico
- Instituto Tecnológico de Tlalnepantla (ITTLA)
- Tlalnepantlas Institute of Technology
- Centro Universitario Emilio Cardenas (CUDEC)
- Escuela Bancaria y Comercial (EBC Tlalnepantla)
- Universidad Latinoamericana (ULA)
- Sistema Educativo Indoamericano (INDO)
- Centro Eleia
- Universidad Interamericana para el Desarrollo (UNID)
- Universidad de Cuautitlan Izcalli (UCI)
- Ateneo de Tlalnepantla
- Universidad ETAC (Escuela Técnica en Administración y Comercio)

Private schools:

- Instituto Thomas Jefferson

== Economy ==
There are more than 2,700 industries located here, making Tlalnepantla one of the most industrialized areas in the country, along with Naucalpan and Monterrey, ranking first in the state of Mexico. The most common industries include: food processing, bottling, tobacco products, textiles, paper products, non-metallic mineral products and metals, chemicals and petroleum products, machinery and wood products. Its industrial zone is one of the largest in the country. The area also includes more than 15,000 retail businesses, including the Mundo E Mall and several large tianguis.

== Notable sites ==
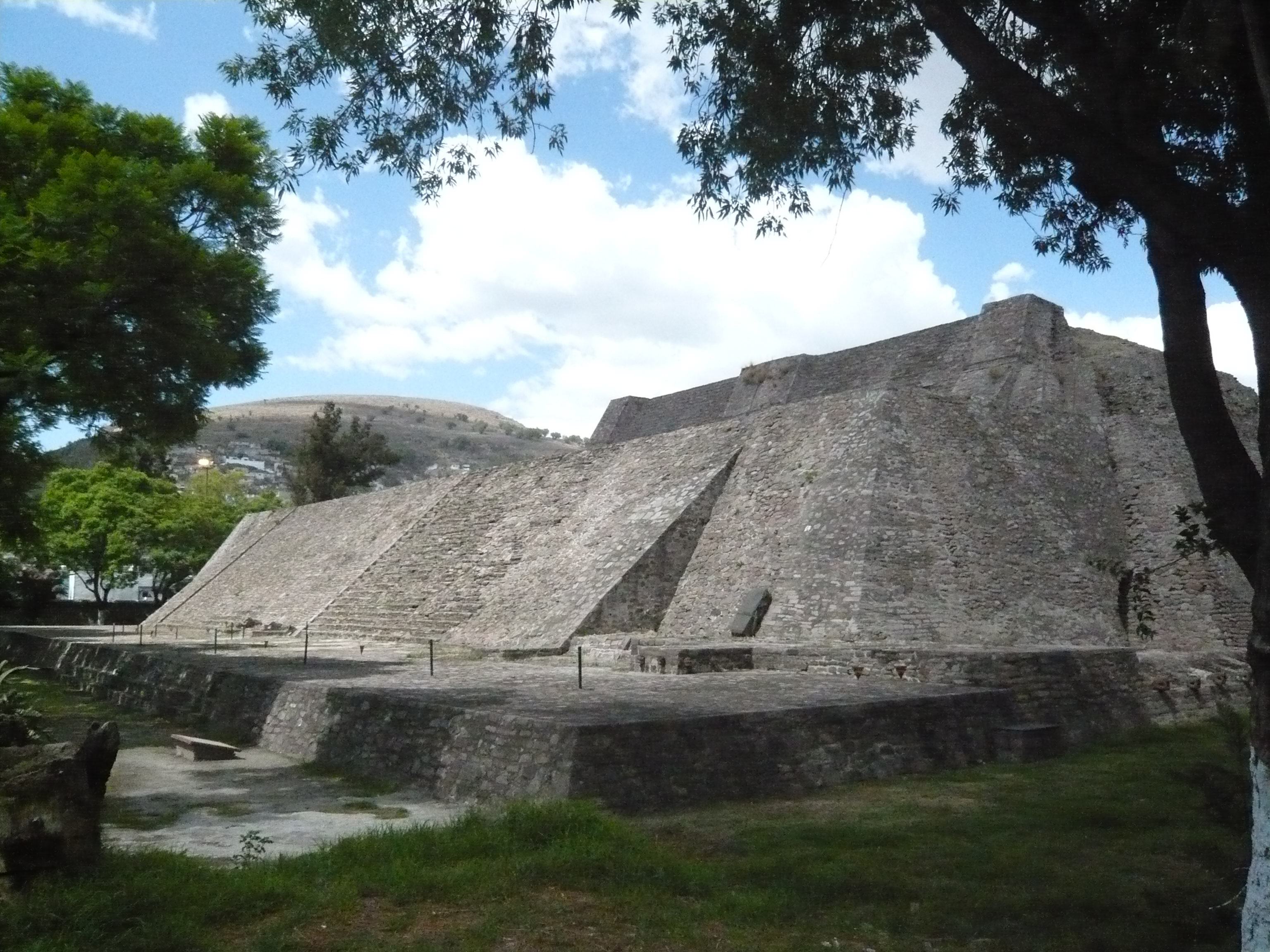
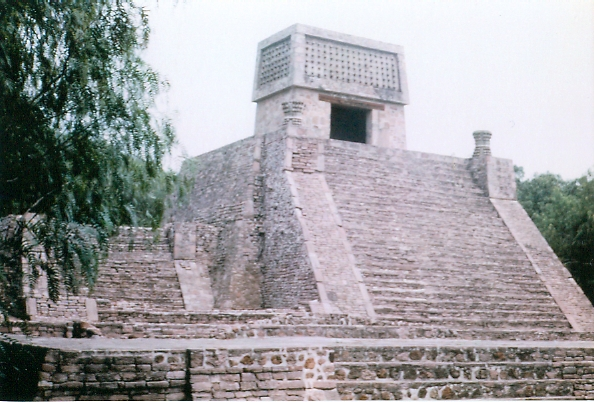
Pyramids of Tenayuca (above) and Santa Cecilia Acatitlán

The church and monastery of Corpus Christi was built by both Nahuas and Otomis of pink and gray stone. The side gate, called the Porciúncula, shows the influence of both these peoples. In 1963, the church gained cathedral status. The aqueduct that extends from Tlalnepantla to Villa de Guadalupe as well as the Caja del Agua are works that date from the colonial period. The Hacienda of Santa Mónica and the Hacienda de Emmedio are well-preserved. The Centro Cultural Sor Juana Inés de la Cruz has a collection of 130 fotografías del Tlalnepantla from the end of the 19th century to 1960 as well as other historical objects.

Two notable pyramids lie in the municipality's limits: Tenayuca and Santa Cecilia Acatitlan. The pyramid at Tenayuca is a smaller version of the Templo Mayor the Aztecs built in Tenochtitlan. It has dual staircases on the west side, each leading to two temples, at the top of the pyramid. One was dedicated to Tlaloc and the other to Huizilopochtli. Serpent sculptures surround the pyramid on three sides and are possibly of pre-Aztec origin. A small museum on the grounds holds artifacts, diagrams, and models of the site and the history that surrounds it. Another smaller pyramid is at Santa Cecilia Acatitlan, just north of Tenayuca. This one was rebuilt as the original was destroyed and some of its blocks were used to build the Santa Cecelia Parish church that is next to it. This pyramid has one staircase, one temple atop. On the plaza is the Hurtado Museum, which houses a small collection of pre-Hispanic sculpture.

== Sister cities ==
- Wichita, Kansas, United States

== Notable people ==
- Carlos Aguiar Retes, Cardinal-archbishop of Tlalnepantla, México
- Edson Álvarez, Mexican footballer
- Gustavo Baz Prada, politician, two-time governor of the State of Mexico and head of the National Autonomous University of Mexico
- Eugenia León, singer
- Pablo Barrera, professional soccer player
- Rodrigo Lopez, former Major League Baseball pitcher
