= Naciones MMA =

Mixed martial arts promotion company

- Company type: Private
- Industry: Mixed martial arts promotion
- Founded: 2020; 6 years ago
- Headquarters: Monterrey, Nuevo León, Mexico

Naciones MMA is a Mexican mixed martial arts promotion based in Monterrey, Nuevo León, founded in 2020 by Eduardo Vargas and Hector Molina.

== History ==
The promotion was founded by two veterans of the international martial arts scene, Vargas and Molina; the latter had previously worked as the owner of Combate Extremo.

The inaugural event, Naciones MMA 1, took place on March 19, 2021, in Monterrey, the organization's headquarters. The event featured nine fights.

On July 22, 2022, Naciones MMA 8 was held in Bogotá, Colombia, the first event outside of Mexico.

== List of events ==
#	Event	Date	Venue	Location
17	Naciones MMA 17: Tampico	October 14, 2023		Tampico, Mexico
16	Naciones MMA 16: Saltillo	August 26, 2023	V Complex	Saltillo, Mexico
15	Naciones MMA 15: Monterrey	June 30, 2023	Showcenter Complex	Monterrey, Mexico
14	Naciones MMA 14: Bogotá	May 27, 2023	Coliseo Arena de Sal	Monterrey, Mexico
13	Naciones MMA 13: Monterrey	April 15, 2023	Showcenter Complex	Monterrey, Mexico
12	Naciones MMA 12: Monterrey	December 8, 2022	Showcenter Complex	Monterrey, Mexico
11	Naciones MMA 11: Tijuana	November 18, 2022	Arena Caliente Casino	Tijuana, Mexico
10	Naciones MMA 10: Ecuador	October 21, 2022	Coliseo Julio César Hidalgo	Quito, Ecuador
9	Naciones MMA 9: Saltillo	August 19, 2022	Centro De Convenciones Canacintra	Saltillo, Mexico
8	Naciones MMA 8: Bogotá	July 22, 2022	Palacio de los Deportes	Bogotá, Colombia
7	Naciones MMA 7: Monterrey	June 17, 2022	Showcenter Complex	Monterrey, Mexico
6	Naciones MMA 6: Mexicali	May 20, 2022		Mexicali, Mexico
5	Naciones MMA 5: Saltillo	March 18, 2022	V Complex	Saltillo, Mexico
4	Naciones MMA 4: Monterrey	February 18, 2022	Auditorio Jacales	Monterrey, Mexico
3	Naciones MMA 3: Tijuana	January 21, 2022	Auditorio Municipal de Tijuana	Tijuana, Mexico
2	Naciones MMA 2: Monterrey	June 18, 2021	Arena Jose Sulaimán	Monterrey, Mexico
1	Naciones MMA 1: Monterrey	March 19, 2021	Arena Jose Sulaimán	Monterrey, Mexico

=== Event locations ===
- Mexico (total: 14)
  - Monterrey, Nuevo León (7)
  - Saltillo, Coahuila (3)
  - Tijuana, Baja California (2)
  - Mexicali, Baja California (1)
  - Tampico, Tamaulipas (1)
- Colombia (total: 2)
  - Bogotá D.C., Cundinamarca Department (2)
- Ecuador (total: 1)
  - Quito, Pichincha (1)
