= List of Mexican UFC fighters =

Ultimate Fighting Championship

The Ultimate Fighting Championship (UFC) is a mixed martial arts (MMA) promotion, founded in 1993 by Art Davie and Rorion Gracie. The organization was purchased from its parent company SEG in 2001 by Zuffa LLC, a promotional company owned by Las Vegas casino magnates, Lorenzo and Frank Fertitta and managed by Dana White (current president of operations). Since its inception, and through its current Zuffa management, the UFC has remained one of the more dominant MMA promotions in the world, playing host to a wide field of MMA fighters.

This list provides an up-to-date roster of all fighters that represent Mexico competing or have previously competed under the UFC promotional banner. (Note: Unless otherwise cited, all fighters listed are retrieved from ufc.com.) (Note: All names presented are in accordance with UFC.com profiles and may include common nicknames or alternative spellings rather than birth names.) Fighters are organized by weight class and within their weight class by their number of appearances inside the UFC. Fighter record and notable wins, achievements. Tournament participation and overall Mexican UFC/MMA records (Note: Unless otherwise cited, all records are retrieved from sherdog.com.)

Each fight record has four categories: wins, losses, draws, and no-contests (NC). All fight records in this article are displayed in that order, with fights resulting in a no-contest listed in parentheses.

== Welterweights (170 lb, 77 kg) ==
ISO	Name	Nickname	UFC record	MMA record	Events	Notes
MEX	Edgar García		0–4	14–5	UFC 107; The Ultimate Fighter 9 Finale; UFC 180; UFC 195	
MEX	Augusto Montaño	Dodger	1–2	15–3	UFC 180; UFC 188; UFC Fight Night 94	
MEX	Erick Montaño(es)	Perry	1–2	10–8	UFC Fight Night 78; UFC Fight Night 94; UFC Fight Night 98	The Ultimate Fighter winner (2015)
MEX	Héctor Urbina	El Toro	1–2	17–11–1	UFC 180; UFC Fight Night 78; UFC Fight Night 95	
MEX	Hector Aldana	El Charro	0–3	4–3	UFC Fight Night 132; UFC Fight Night 140; UFC Fight Night 161	

== Lightweights (155 lb, 70 kg) ==
ISO	Name	Nickname	UFC record	MMA record	Events	Notes
MEX	Efraín Escudero	Hecho en México	5–7	32–17	The Ultimate Fighter 8 Finale; UFC 103; UFC Fight Night 20; UFC 114; UFC Fight Night 22; UFC 141; UFC 145; UFC Fight Night 51; UFC Fight Night 60; UFC 188; UFC Fight Night 78; UFC 197	The Ultimate Fighter winner (2008); First Mexican man to fight in the promotion
MEX	Rafa García Jr.	Gifted	7–4	18–4	UFC Fight Night 187; UFC on ESPN 28; UFC Fight Night 198; UFC on ESPN 34; UFC 277; UFC Fight Night 216; UFC on ESPN 44; UFC Fight Night 244; UFC on ESPN 64; UFC Fight Night 259; UFC Fight Night 274	
MEX	Manuel Torres	Loco	5–2	17–4	UFC on ESPN 36; UFC on ESPN 47; UFC Fight Night 237; UFC 306; UFC on ESPN 64; UFC 323; UFC Fight Night 280	
MEX	Polo Reyes	Torito	4–4	11–9	UFC Fight Night 78; UFC 199; UFC Fight Night 98; UFC 211; UFC Fight Night 124; UFC Fight Night 145; UFC on ESPN 3; UFC Fight Night 159	
MEX	Daniel Zellhuber	Golden Boy	3–4	15–4	UFC Fight Night 210; UFC on ESPN 44; UFC Fight Night 227; UFC Fight Night 237; UFC 306; UFC 318; UFC Fight Night 268	
MEX	Álvaro Herrera	El Chango	2–2	9–7	UFC Fight Night 78; UFC Fight Night 90; UFC Fight Night 114; UFC on Fox 30	
MEX	Akbarh Arreola	El Caballero	1–3	27–11	UFC on Fox 12; UFC Fight Night 57; UFC Fight Night 62; UFC 193	
MEX	Rodrigo Vargas	Kazula	1–3	16–6	UFC Fight Night 156; UFC Fight Night 167; UFC 261; UFC Fight Night 204	
MEX	Francisco Treviño	Frank	1–2	13–3	UFC 171; UFC 188; UFC 192	
MEX	Genaro Valdez(es)	Rayadito	0–3	10–3	UFC 270; UFC on ESPN 42; UFC on ESPN 49	
MEX	Roberto Romero(es)	El Charro Negro	0–2	8–5–1	UFC 309; UFC on ESPN 66	

== Featherweights (145 lb, 65 kg) ==
ISO	Name	Nickname	UFC record	MMA record	Events	Notes
MEX	Yair Rodríguez	Pantera	11–4 (1)	20–5 (1)	UFC 180; UFC 188; UFC 192; UFC 197; UFC Fight Night 92; UFC Fight Night 103; UFC 211; UFC Fight Night 139; UFC Fight Night 159; UFC on ESPN 6; UFC Fight Night 197; UFC on ABC 3; UFC 284; UFC 290; UFC Fight Night 237; UFC 314	Former UFC Interim Featherweight Champion; The Ultimate Fighter winner (2014); Mexican fighter with the most bonus award in UFC history, with a total of 9; Latest knockout in UFC history (4:59 in Round 5)
MEX	Gabriel Benítez	Moggly	7–8	23–12	UFC 180; UFC 188; UFC Fight Night 78; UFC Fight Night 94; UFC 211; UFC Fight Night 123; UFC Fight Night 129; UFC 241; UFC Fight Night 171; UFC on ESPN 19; UFC on ESPN 26; UFC Fight Night 201; UFC on ESPN 41; UFC Fight Night 234; UFC on ESPN 55	
MEX	José Miguel Delgado		4–1	12–2	UFC Fight Night 251; UFC 317; UFC 321; UFC Fight Night 269; UFC Fight Night 281	
MEX	Fernando Padilla	El Valiente	2–2	16–6	UFC on ESPN+ 45; UFC Fight Night 227; UFC on ESPN 53; UFC on ESPN 6	
MEX	Martin Bravo	El Toro	1–3	13–4	UFC Fight Night 98; UFC Fight Night 114; The Ultimate Fighter 27 Finale; UFC Fight Night 159	The Ultimate Fighter winner (2016)
MEX	Masio Fullen(es)	Lobo	1–2	15–11	UFC 184; UFC Fight Night 69; UFC on Fox 18	
MEX	Horacio Gutiérrez(es)	The Punisher	0–2	7–3	UFC Fight Night 78; UFC Fight Night 92	
MEX	Juan Puig(es)	Fenix	0–2	11–4	The Ultimate Fighter 19 Finale; UFC Fight Night 57	
MEX	Rodolfo Rubio(es)	Fito	0–1	20–13–1	UFC Fight Night 56	
MEX	Ramiro Jiménez(es)	Cachanilla	TBA	11–0		

== Bantamweights (135 lb, 61 kg) ==
ISO	Name	Nickname	UFC record	MMA record	Events	Notes
MEX	Alejandro Pérez	Turbo	8–4–1	22–9–1	UFC 180; UFC 188; UFC Fight Night 78; UFC Fight Night 86; UFC Fight Night 94; UFC Fight Night 114; UFC Fight Night 123; UFC on FOX 29; UFC Fight Night 133; UFC 235; UFC 239; UFC Fight Night 193; UFC Fight Night 202	The Ultimate Fighter winner (2014)
MEX	Erik Pérez	Goyito	7–2	21–9	The Ultimate Fighter 15 Finale; UFC 150; UFC 155; UFC Fight Night 27; UFC 167; UFC Fight Night 42; UFC Fight Night 78; UFC 201; UFC Fight 98	Fastest knockout in UFC Bantamweight division history (17 seconds)
MEX	José Alberto Quiñónez	Teco	5–4	12–8	UFC 180; UFC Fight Night 68; UFC Fight Night 94; UFC Fight Night 114; UFC 221; UFC Fight Night 147; UFC Fight Night 159; UFC 248; UFC on ESPN 19	
MEX	Raul Rosas Jr.	Niño Problema	6–1	12–1	UFC 282; UFC 287; UFC Fight Night 227; UFC on ESPN 57; UFC 306; UFC on ESPN 64; UFC 326	Youngest fighter to win a UFC bout (18 years, 2 months); Youngest fighter to win five UFC bouts (20 years, 5 months)
MEX	Marco Beltrán	Psycho	3–3	19–10 (1)	UFC 180; UFC Fight Night 79; UFC Fight Night 90; UFC Fight 98; UFC 212; UFC 216	
MEX	Henry Briones	Bure	1–4	16–8–1	UFC 180; UFC 189; UFC Fight 98; UFC Fight Night 114; UFC Fight Night 129	
MEX	Will Campuzano		0–4	14–6	The Ultimate Fighter 12 Finale; UFC: Fight for the Troops 2; UFC 167; UFC 171	
MEX	Cristian Quiñónez	Problema	2–2	19–5	UFC Fight Night 209; UFC on ESPN 47; UFC Fight Night 237; UFC Fight Night 268	
MEX	David Martínez	Black Spartan	3–0	14–1	UFC on ESPN 64; UFC Fight Night 259; UFC Fight Night 268	
MEX	Santiago Luna	Border Boy	2–1	8–1	UFC Fight Night 259; UFC Fight Night 268; UFC Fight Night 278	
MEX	Irwin Rivera	The Beast	1–2	12–7	UFC on ESPN 8; UFC Fight Night 174; UFC Fight Night 178	
MEX	Alex Soto(es)	Extremo	0–2	8–3–1	UFC 139; UFC on Fuel TV 3	
MEX	Gianni Vázquez	Kryptonita	0–2	14–7	UFC Fight Night 266; UFC Fight Night 284	
MEX	Jessie Rosas	Tachidito	TBA	8–1		

== Flyweights (125 lb, 56 kg) ==
ISO	Name	Nickname	UFC record	MMA record	Events	Notes
MEX	Brandon Moreno	Assassin Baby	11–7–2	23–10–2	UFC Fight Night 96; The Ultimate Fighter 24 Finale; UFC Fight Night 108; UFC Fight Night 114; UFC Fight Night 129; UFC Fight Night 159; UFC 245; UFC Fight Night 170; UFC 255; UFC 256; UFC 263; UFC 270; UFC 277; UFC 283; UFC 290; UFC Fight Night 237; UFC Fight Night 246; UFC on ESPN 64; UFC 323; UFC Fight Night 268	Two time former UFC Flyweight Champion; First Mexican man UFC Champion
MEX	Édgar Cháirez	Puro Chicali	4–2 (1)	14–6 (1)	UFC 290; UFC Fight Night 227; UFC Fight Night 237; UFC 306; UFC on ESPN 64; UFC Fight Night 268; UFC Fight Night 278	
MEX	Jesús Santos Aguilar(es)		4–3	12–4	UFC Fight Night 218; UFC 290; UFC Fight Night 237; UFC 305; UFC Fight Night 251; UFC Fight Night: Lopes vs. Silva; UFC 326	
MEX	Víctor Altamirano(es)	El Magnífico	2–4	12–5	UFC Fight Night 202; UFC 278; UFC on ESPN 43; UFC on ESPN+ 46; UFC Fight Night 237; UFC on ESPN +101	
MEX	Hector Sandoval	Kid Alex	2–2	15–4	UFC 201; UFC on Fox 22; UFC Fight Night 108; UFC Fight Night 114	
MEX	Ronaldo Rodríguez	Lazy Boy	2–1	17–3	UFC Fight Night 237; UFC 306; UFC on ESPN 64	
MEX	Víctor Rodríguez(es)	Vicious	0–2	5–4	UFC Fight Night 181; UFC Fight Night 188	
MEX	Imanol Rodríguez(es)	Himan	1–0	7–0	UFC Fight Night 268	

== Women's Bantamweight (135 lb, 61 kg) ==
ISO	Name	Nickname	UFC record	MMA record	Events	Notes
MEX	Irene Aldana		8–6	15–8	UFC on Fox 22; UFC 210; UFC Fight Night 124; UFC 228; UFC 237; UFC on ESPN 4; UFC Fight Night 159; UFC 245; UFC on ESPN 16; UFC 264; UFC 279; UFC 289; UFC 296; UFC 306	Second most significant strikes landed in UFC Women's Bantamweight division history (1028)
MEX	Montserrat Rendón(es)	Montser	2–2	7–2	UFC Fight Night 228; UFC on ESPN 53; UFC Fight Night 259; UFC Fight Night: UFC Fight Night 269	
MEX	Regina Tarín(es)	Kill Bill	1–0	8–0	UFC Fight Night 268	

== Women's Flyweight (125 lb, 56 kg) ==
ISO	Name	Nickname	UFC record	MMA record	Events	Notes
MEX	Alexa Grasso		9–5–1	17–5–1	UFC Fight Night 98; UFC Fight Night 104; UFC Fight Night 114; UFC Fight Night 129; UFC 238; UFC Fight Night 159; UFC Fight Night 175; UFC 258; UFC on ESPN 33; UFC Fight Night 212; UFC 285; UFC Fight Night 227; UFC 306; UFC 315; UFC Fight Night 271	First Mexican woman UFC Champion

== Women's Strawweight (115 lb, 52 kg) ==
ISO	Name	Nickname	UFC record	MMA record	Events	Notes
MEX	Lupita Godínez	Loopy	9–6	14–6	UFC on ESPN 22; UFC Fight Night 194; UFC Fight Night 195; UFC Fight Night 198; UFC 274; UFC on ESPN 41; UFC 287; UFC Fight Night 223; UFC Fight Night 227; UFC 295; UFC on ESPN 54; UFC on ABC 7; UFC on ESPN 64; UFC 319; UFC 327	First and only woman to win four fights in a calendar year in UFC history
MEX	Yazmin Jauregui		3–2	11–2	UFC on ESPN 41; UFC on ESPN 42; UFC 290; UFC Fight Night 237; UFC 306	
MEX	Jessica Aguilar	JAG	1–4	20–10	UFC 190; UFC 211; UFC Fight Night 133; UFC Fight Night 141; UFC on ESPN 2	First Mexican woman to fight in the promotion
MEX	Montserrat Ruiz	Conejo	1–4	10–5	UFC on ESPN 21; UFC on ESPN 26; UFC on ESPN 51; UFC Fight Night 231; UFC Fight Night 263	
MEX	Melissa Martínez(es)	Super Mely	1–2	8–2	UFC 279; UFC on ESPN +102; UFC on ESPN 70	

== See also ==
- List of current UFC fighters
