= Bruce Leroy =

Bruce Leroy may refer to:

- Leroy Green, also known as Bruce Leroy, in 1985 film The Last Dragon, who is portrayed by Taimak
- Alex Caceres, also known as Bruce Leroy, UFC fighter
