= Claudio Puelles =

Peruvian mixed martial arts fighter

- Born: Claudio Puelles Martinez; April 21, 1996 (age 30); Lima, Peru
- Other names: Prince of Peru
- Height: 5 ft 11 in (1.80 m)
- Weight: 155 lb (70 kg; 11.1 st)
- Division: Lightweight; Featherweight
- Reach: 72 in (183 cm)
- Fighting out of: Molina, Peru
- Team: Pitbull Martial Arts Center; Sanford MMA (2021–present)
- Rank: Purple belt in Luta Livre
- Years active: 2013–present

Mixed martial arts record
- Total: 17
- Wins: 12
- By knockout: 2
- By submission: 7
- By decision: 3
- Losses: 5
- By knockout: 2
- By decision: 3

Other information
- Mixed martial arts record from Sherdog

Claudio Puelles Martinez (born April 21, 1996) is a Peruvian professional mixed martial artist, he currently competes in the Lightweight division of the Ultimate Fighting Championship.

== Background ==
Puelles started training Muay Thai around the age of 13, quickly picking up grappling also before transitioning to mixed martial arts in his adolescent years.

== Mixed martial arts career ==
=== Early career ===
Puelles started his professional MMA career in 2013 and fought primarily in Peru. He amassed a record of 7–1 prior to participating in The Ultimate Fighter: Latin America 3.

=== The Ultimate Fighter Latin America 3 ===
In 2016 Puelles competed on the third season of The Ultimate Fighter: Latin America 3 series under Team Chuck Liddell.

In the elimination round, Puelles defeated José David Flores via a technical knockout in the first round. In the quarterfinals, Puelles defeated Pablo Sabori via a submission. In the semifinals, he defeated Marcelo Rojo by a unanimous decision. This win earned him a spot in the finale against Martín Bravo on November 5, 2016, in Mexico City, Mexico at The Ultimate Fighter Latin America 3 Finale.

=== Ultimate Fighting Championship ===
Puelles made his official UFC debut against Martin Bravo on November 5, 2016, in Mexico City, Mexico at The Ultimate Fighter Latin America 3 Finale. He lost the fight via TKO in the second round.

On May 19, 2018, Puelles faced Felipe Silva at UFC Fight Night: Maia vs. Usman. He won the fight via a submission in round three. The submission gained him a Performance of the Night bonus award.

Puelles faced Marcos Mariano on September 21, 2019, at UFC Fight Night: Rodríguez vs. Stephens. He won the fight via unanimous decision.

Puelles faced Jordan Leavitt on June 5, 2021, at UFC Fight Night: Rozenstruik vs. Sakai. He won the bout via unanimous decision.

Puelles faced Chris Gruetzemacher on December 4, 2021, at UFC on ESPN 31. He won the fight via a kneebar in round three.

Puelles faced Clay Guida on April 23, 2022, at UFC Fight Night 205. He won the fight via a kneebar in round one. This win earned him a Performance of the Night award.

Puelles faced Dan Hooker on November 12, 2022, at UFC 281. He lost the fight via TKO in round two after being dropped by a front kick to the body, Puelles was condemned for the strategies he employed.

Puelles faced Farès Ziam on February 24, 2024, at UFC Fight Night 237. Despite having a career high of seven takedowns, Puelles only landed four significant strikes and ended up losing the bout by split decision.

Puelles faced Joaquim Silva on September 13, 2025, at UFC Fight Night 259. He lost the fight by split decision.

== Championships and accomplishments ==
- Ultimate Fighting Championship
  - Performance of the Night (Two times) vs. Felipe Silva and Clay Guida
  - Most kneebar submissions in UFC history (3)
  - UFC.com Awards
    - 2018: Ranked #8 Submission of the Year vs. Felipe Silva
    - 2022: Ranked #5 Submission of the Year vs. Clay Guida

== Mixed martial arts record ==
Professional record breakdown
17 matches	12 wins	5 losses
By knockout	2	2
By submission	7	0
By decision	3	3

Res.	Record	Opponent	Method	Event	Date	Round	Time	Location	Notes
Loss	12–5	Joaquim Silva	Decision (split)	UFC Fight Night: Lopes vs. Silva	September 13, 2025	3	5:00	San Antonio, Texas, United States	
Loss	12–4	Farès Ziam	Decision (split)	UFC Fight Night: Moreno vs. Royval 2	February 24, 2024	3	5:00	Mexico City, Mexico	
Loss	12–3	Dan Hooker	TKO (front kick to the body)	UFC 281	November 12, 2022	2	4:06	New York City, New York, United States	
Win	12–2	Clay Guida	Submission (kneebar)	UFC Fight Night: Lemos vs. Andrade	April 23, 2022	1	3:01	Las Vegas, Nevada, United States	Performance of the Night.
Win	11–2	Chris Gruetzemacher	Submission (kneebar)	UFC on ESPN: Font vs. Aldo	December 4, 2021	3	3:26	Las Vegas, Nevada, United States	
Win	10–2	Jordan Leavitt	Decision (unanimous)	UFC Fight Night: Rozenstruik vs. Sakai	June 5, 2021	3	5:00	Las Vegas, Nevada, United States	
Win	9–2	Marcos Mariano	Decision (unanimous)	UFC Fight Night: Rodríguez vs. Stephens	September 21, 2019	3	5:00	Mexico City, Mexico	
Win	8–2	Felipe Silva	Submission (kneebar)	UFC Fight Night: Maia vs. Usman	May 19, 2018	3	2:23	Santiago, Chile	Performance of the Night.
Loss	7–2	Martin Bravo	TKO (punches)	The Ultimate Fighter Latin America 3 Finale: dos Anjos vs. Ferguson	November 5, 2016	2	1:55	Mexico City, Mexico	The Ultimate Fighter: Latin America 3 Lightweight Tournament Final.
Win	7–1	Alvaro Sugasti	KO (head kick)	300 Sparta 6	April 18, 2015	1	1:24	Lima, Peru	
Win	6–1	Edimar Martins Rayol	Submission (kneebar)	Inka FC: Inka Warriors 2	October 25, 2014	1	2:36	Lima, Peru	
Loss	5–1	David Cubas	Decision (unanimous)	Inka FC: Inka Warriors 1	August 30, 2014	3	5:00	Lima, Peru	
Win	5–0	Lander Duarte Alves	Decision (unanimous)	Inka FC 25	April 16, 2014	3	5:00	Lima, Peru	
Win	4–0	Guile Calvete	Submission (rear-naked choke)	300 Sparta 5	February 16, 2014	2	N/A	Lima, Peru	
Win	3–0	Manuel Meza	TKO (cut)	300 Sparta 4	October 10, 2013	3	0:00	Lima, Peru	Featherweight bout.
Win	2–0	Renzo Mendez	Submission (arm-triangle choke)	Inka FC 23	August 24, 2013	2	0:00	Lima, Peru	
Win	1–0	Angel Alvarez	Submission (armbar)	300 Sparta 2	July 17, 2013	3	N/A	Lima, Peru	

=== Mixed martial arts exhibition record ===
Exhibition record breakdown		
3 matches	3 wins	0 losses
By knockout	1	0
By submission	1	0
By decision	1	0

Res.	Record	Opponent	Method	Event	Date	Round	Time	Location	Notes
Win	3–0	Marcelo Rojo	Decision (unanimous)	The Ultimate Fighter: Latin America 3	Jun 11, 2016	3	5:00	Buenos Aires, Argentina	The Ultimate Fighter: Latin America 3 Semi-final round.
Win	2–0	Pablo Sabori	Submission (kneebar)	The Ultimate Fighter: Latin America 3	Jun 3, 2016	1	N/A	Buenos Aires, Argentina	The Ultimate Fighter: Latin America 3 Quarterfinal round.
Win	1–0	José David Flores	TKO (punches)	The Ultimate Fighter: Latin America 3	May 20, 2016	1	N/A	Buenos Aires, Argentina	The Ultimate Fighter: Latin America 3 Elimination round.

== See also ==
- List of current UFC fighters
- List of male mixed martial artists
