= Steven Peterson =

American mixed martial artist (born 1990)

- Born: May 29, 1990 (age 36); Redondo Beach, California, United States
- Nickname: Ocho
- Height: 5 ft 9 in (1.75 m)
- Weight: 145 lb (66 kg; 10 st 5 lb)
- Division: Featherweight; Bantamweight
- Reach: 70 in (178 cm)
- Fighting out of: Plano, Texas, United States; McKinney, Texas, United States
- Team: Fortis MMA
- Rank: Brown belt in Brazilian Jiu-Jitsu; Kru Red/Yellow band in Muay Thai
- Years active: 2010–2023

Mixed martial arts record
- Total: 30
- Wins: 19
- By knockout: 5
- By submission: 8
- By decision: 6
- Losses: 11
- By knockout: 1
- By decision: 10

Other information
- Website: ochotv.net
- Mixed martial arts record from Sherdog

Steven Peterson (born May 29, 1990) is an American former professional mixed martial artist. Peterson competed in the Featherweight division, for the Ultimate Fighting Championship (UFC). A professional competitor, from 2010 to 2023, Peterson has also competed for Bellator Fighting Championships, and the Legacy Fighting Alliance.

== Mixed martial arts career ==
=== Early career ===
Peterson made his Bellator Fighting Championships debut, on September 2, 2010 at Bellator 27, against Ernest de la Cruz, winning by unanimous decision.

Peterson made his second and final appearance in Bellator, on March 23, 2012, against Chris Jones, at Bellator 62, losing by split decision. Peterson competed extensively in both Legacy FC and Legacy Fighting Alliance, winning the Legacy FC Bantamweight title, at Legacy FC 56 vs. Manny Vasquez by rear-naked choke. Peterson lost a title unification bout at LFA 1, against Leandro Higo by unanimous decision.

=== Dana White Tuesday Night Contender Series ===
Peterson competed on Dana White's Contender Series 7, for a chance at a UFC contract, on August 22, 2017, against Benito Lopez, losing by split decision.

=== Ultimate Fighting Championship ===
Peterson was expected to make his UFC debut, at UFC Fight Night 126, on February 18, 2018, against Humberto Bandenay. However, due to visa issues, for Bandenay, he was replaced by Brandon Davis. Peterson lost the fight by unanimous decision. This fight earned Peterson the Fight of the Night award.

Peterson's next bout took place, at The Ultimate Fighter: Undefeated Finale, on July 6, 2018, against Matt Bessette. Peterson won the fight by split decision.

Peterson faced Luis Peña, on March 23, 2019, at UFC Fight Night 148. At the weigh-ins, Peña weighed in at 148.5 lbs, 2.5 pounds over the featherweight non-title fight limit of 146 lbs. Peña was fined 30% of his fight purse, and the bout proceed at a catchweight. Peterson lost the fight by unanimous decision. Peterson signed a new, four-fight contract with the UFC after the fight.

Peterson faced Alex Caceres, on July 20, 2019, at UFC on ESPN 4. Peterson lost the fight by unanimous decision.

Peterson faced Martín Bravo, on September 21, 2019, at UFC on ESPN+ 17. Peterson won the fight by knockout by spinning back fist in the second round. This win earn Peterson the Performance of the Night award. Peterson said of his knockout, "I went to evade his spinning backfist and it just naturally came because I made the same step and it was right after I jabbed when he did it. The jab was the perfect setup. I was just in a flow state when I did it. Everything came natural when I landed that backfist."

Peterson was expected to face Aalon Cruz, on February 29, 2020, at UFC Fight Night 169. However, Peterson was pulled from the event, for unknown reasons, and he was replaced by promotional newcomer Spike Carlyle.

Peterson was expected to face Seung Woo Choi, on February 6, 2021, at UFC Fight Night 184. However, Peterson pulled out of the fight on January 1, due to an injury, and he was replaced by promotional newcomer Collin Anglin.

Peterson faced Chase Hooper, on June 12, 2021, at UFC 263. At the weigh-ins, Peterson weighed in at 148.5 pounds, two and a half pounds over the featherweight non-title fight limit. The bout proceeded at a catchweight, and Peterson was fined 20% of his purse, which went go to his opponent. Peterson won the fight by unanimous decision.

Peterson faced Julian Erosa, on February 5, 2022, at UFC Fight Night 200. At the weigh-ins, Peterson weighed in at 149 pounds, three pounds over the featherweight non-title fight limit. The bout proceeded at a catchweight, and Peterson was fined 30% of his purse, which went to his opponent. Peterson lost the fight by split decision. 13 out of 18 media scores gave it to Erosa. This fight earned Peterson the Fight of the Night award, but Peterson was unable to collect the bonus, due to his weight miss. As a result, Peterson's award was given to Erosa.

Peterson faced Lucas Alexander, on March 25, 2023, at UFC on ESPN 43. Peterson lost the fight by unanimous decision, and announced his retirement after his fight.

== Championships and achievements ==
- Ultimate Fighting Championship
  - Performance of the Night (One time) vs. Martín Bravo
  - Fight of the Night (Two times) vs. Brandon Davis and Julian Erosa
- MMAJunkie.com
  - 2019 September Knockout of the Month vs. Martín Bravo

== Mixed martial arts record ==
Professional record breakdown
30 matches	19 wins	11 losses
By knockout	5	1
By submission	8	0
By decision	6	10

Res.	Record	Opponent	Method	Event	Date	Round	Time	Location	Notes
Loss	19–11	Lucas Alexander	Decision (unanimous)	UFC on ESPN: Vera vs. Sandhagen	March 25, 2023	3	5:00	San Antonio, Texas, United States	
Loss	19–10	Julian Erosa	Decision (split)	UFC Fight Night: Hermansson vs. Strickland	February 5, 2022	3	5:00	Las Vegas, Nevada, United States	Catchweight (149 lb) bout; Peterson missed weight. Fight of the Night
Win	19–9	Chase Hooper	Decision (unanimous)	UFC 263	June 12, 2021	3	5:00	Glendale, Arizona, United States	Catchweight (148.5 lb) bout; Peterson missed weight.
Win	18–9	Martín Bravo	KO (spinning back fist)	UFC Fight Night: Rodríguez vs. Stephens	September 21, 2019	2	1:31	Mexico City, Mexico	Performance of the Night.
Loss	17–9	Alex Caceres	Decision (unanimous)	UFC on ESPN: dos Anjos vs. Edwards	July 20, 2019	3	5:00	San Antonio, Texas, United States	
Loss	17–8	Luis Peña	Decision (unanimous)	UFC Fight Night: Thompson vs. Pettis	March 23, 2019	3	5:00	Nashville, Tennessee, United States	Catchweight (148.5 lb) bout; Peña missed weight.
Win	17–7	Matt Bessette	Decision (split)	The Ultimate Fighter: Undefeated Finale	July 6, 2018	3	5:00	Las Vegas, Nevada, United States	
Loss	16–7	Brandon Davis	Decision (unanimous)	UFC Fight Night: Cowboy vs. Medeiros	February 18, 2018	3	5:00	Austin, Texas, United States	Fight of the Night.
Win	16–6	Dustin Winter	TKO (punches)	LFA 28	December 8, 2017	2	2:38	Dallas, Texas, United States	Return to Featherweight.
Loss	15–6	Benito Lopez	Decision (split)	Dana White's Contender Series 7	August 22, 2017	3	5:00	Las Vegas, Nevada, United States	
Win	15–5	Ryan Hollis	Submission (rear-naked choke)	LFA 16	July 14, 2017	2	1:43	Dallas, Texas, United States	Catchweight (140 lb) bout.
Loss	14–5	Leandro Higo	Decision (unanimous)	LFA 1	January 13, 2017	5	5:00	Dallas, Texas, United States	For the inaugural LFA Bantamweight Championship.
Win	14–4	Manny Vasquez	Technical Submission (rear-naked choke)	Legacy FC 56	June 24, 2016	4	3:08	Dallas, Texas, United States	Won the Legacy FC Bantamweight Championship.
Win	13–4	Irwin Rivera	Decision (unanimous)	Legacy FC 46	October 2, 2015	3	5:00	Allen, Texas, United States	
Win	12–4	Caio Machado	Submission (guillotine choke)	Legacy FC 38	February 13, 2015	1	3:55	Allen, Texas, United States	
Win	11–4	Ray Rodriguez	Decision (unanimous)	Legacy FC 33	July 18, 2014	3	5:00	Allen, Texas, United States	Featherweight bout.
Win	10–4	Ray Rodriguez	TKO	Legacy FC 28	February 21, 2014	2	n/a	Arlington, Texas, United States	Featherweight bout.
Win	9–4	Nelson Salas	TKO (punches)	Xtreme Knockout 19	August 17, 2013	4	1:58	Dallas, Texas, United States	Won the XKO Bantamweight Championship.
Loss	8–4	George Pacurariu	KO (punch)	Legacy FC 19	April 12, 2013	1	3:42	Dallas, Texas, United States	
Loss	8–3	Matt Hobar	Decision (majority)	Legacy FC 16	December 14, 2012	3	5:00	Dallas, Texas, United States	
Win	8–2	Cody Williams	Submission (omoplata)	Legacy FC 14	September 14, 2012	2	4:46	Houston, Texas, United States	Catchweight (140 lb) bout.
Win	7–2	Matt Hobar	TKO (arm injury)	Legacy FC 13	August 17, 2012	1	4:04	Dallas, Texas, United States	Return to Bantamweight.
Loss	6–2	Chris Jones	Decision (split)	Bellator 62	March 23, 2012	3	5:00	Laredo, Texas, United States	Featherweight bout.
Win	6–1	Steve Garcia	Submission (guillotine choke)	Legacy FC 8	September 16, 2011	1	1:40	Houston, Texas, United States	Bantamweight bout.
Win	5–1	Alex Russ	Submission (rear-naked choke)	Xtreme Knockout 11	July 23, 2011	1	1:57	Arlington, Texas, United States	
Win	4–1	Douglas Frey	Decision (majority)	Xtreme Knockout 10	April 9, 2011	4	1:11	Arlington, Texas, United States	
Win	3–1	Quaint Kempf	Submission (armbar)	Xtreme Knockout 9	January 29, 2011	1	0:24	Arlington, Texas, United States	
Loss	2–1	Brad Mitchell	Decision (unanimous)	Xtreme Knockout 8	October 9, 2010	3	3:00	Arlington, Texas, United States	
Win	2–0	Ernest de la Cruz	Decision (unanimous)	Bellator 27	September 2, 2010	3	3:00	San Antonio, Texas, United States	Featherweight bout.
Win	1–0	Marcus Dupar	Submission (armbar)	TCF: Puro Combate 1	August 4, 2010	3	2:26	Houston, Texas, United States	

== See also ==
- List of male mixed martial artists
