= UFC Fight Night: Moreno vs. Royval 2 =

2024 mixed martial event in Mexico

- The poster for UFC Fight Night: Moreno vs. Royval 2
- Promotion: Ultimate Fighting Championship
- Date: February 24, 2024
- Venue: Arena CDMX
- City: Mexico City, Mexico
- Attendance: 21,546
- Total gate: Not announced

Event chronology
| UFC 298: Volkanovski vs. Topuria | UFC Fight Night: Moreno vs. Royval 2 | UFC Fight Night: Rozenstruik vs. Gaziev |

UFC Fight Night: Moreno vs. Royval 2 (also known as UFC Fight Night 237 and UFC on ESPN+ 95) was a mixed martial arts event produced by the Ultimate Fighting Championship that took place on February 24, 2024, at Arena CDMX, in Mexico City, Mexico.

== Background ==
The event marked the promotion's sixth visit to Mexico City and first since UFC Fight Night: Rodríguez vs. Stephens in September 2019.

A flyweight bout between former two-time UFC Flyweight Champion Brandon Moreno and Amir Albazi was originally expected to serve as a five-round co-main event, but was elevated as the event's headliner. However, Albazi withdrew due to a neck injury and was replaced by former title challenger (also former LFA Flyweight Champion) Brandon Royval. The pair previously met at UFC 255 in November 2020 which Moreno won by first round TKO. Moreno and Albazi were later scheduled to meet in November 2024 at UFC Fight Night: Moreno vs. Albazi.

A featherweight rematch between former interim UFC Featherweight Champion (also The Ultimate Fighter: Latin America featherweight winner) Yair Rodríguez and former title challenger Brian Ortega took place in the co-main event, which marked the sixth time a non-main event and non-title bout has been scheduled for five rounds. The pairing previously met at UFC on ABC: Ortega vs. Rodríguez which Rodríguez won by first round TKO due to a shoulder injury.

A flyweight rematch between Édgar Cháirez and Daniel Lacerda took place the event. The pair had previously fought at UFC Fight Night: Grasso vs. Shevchenko 2 in September 2023, where the bout was ruled a no-contest due to premature referee stoppage. They were booked again for UFC Fight Night: Yusuff vs. Barboza two months later, but the bout was cancelled due to Lacerda suffering medical issues after the weigh-in. At the weigh ins, both fighters missed weight. Cháirez weighed in at 131 pounds and Lacerda at 127 pounds, five pounds and one pound over the flyweight non-title fight limit, respectively. Their bout proceeded at catchweight with both fighters fined a percentage of their purse.

A bantamweight bout between Raul Rosas Jr. and The Ultimate Fighter 29 bantamweight winner Ricky Turcios was expected to take place at the event. However, Rosas Jr. was forced withdraw just before the bout was expected to begin due to an illness. As a result, the bout was initially pushed back one week to UFC Fight Night: Rozenstruik vs. Gaziev before it was ultimately cancelled by the promotion.

== Results ==
Main card (ESPN+)
| Weight class | | | | Method | Round | Time | Notes |
|---|---|---|---|---|---|---|---|
| Flyweight | Brandon Royval | def. | Brandon Moreno | Decision (split) (48–47, 46–49, 48–47) | 5 | 5:00 |
| Featherweight | Brian Ortega | def. | Yair Rodríguez | Submission (arm-triangle choke) | 3 | 0:58 |
| Lightweight | Daniel Zellhuber | def. | Francisco Prado | Decision (unanimous) (29–28, 29–28, 30–27) | 3 | 5:00 |
| Women's Strawweight | Yazmin Jauregui | def. | Sam Hughes | Decision (unanimous) (30–27, 30–27, 30–27) | 3 | 5:00 |
| Lightweight | Manuel Torres | def. | Chris Duncan | Submission (rear-naked choke) | 1 | 1:46 |
Preliminary card (ESPN+)
| Bantamweight | Raoni Barcelos | def. | Cristian Quiñónez | Submission (rear-naked choke) | 3 | 2:04 |
| Flyweight | Jesús Santos Aguilar | def. | Mateus Mendonça | Decision (split) (29–28, 28–29, 29–28) | 3 | 5:00 |
| Catchweight (131 lb) | Édgar Cháirez | def. | Daniel Lacerda | Submission (triangle choke) | 1 | 2:17 |
| Lightweight | Farès Ziam | def. | Claudio Puelles | Decision (split) (28–29, 30–27, 29–28) | 3 | 5:00 |
| Flyweight | Ronaldo Rodríguez | def. | Denys Bondar | Submission (rear-naked choke) | 2 | 4:59 |
| Flyweight | Felipe dos Santos | def. | Victor Altamirano | Decision (split) (27–30, 29–28, 29–28) | 3 | 5:00 |
| Featherweight | Muhammad Naimov | def. | Erik Silva | TKO (leg injury) | 1 | 0:44 |

== Bonus awards ==
The following fighters received $50,000 bonuses.

- Fight of the Night: Daniel Zellhuber vs. Francisco Prado
- Performance of the Night: Brian Ortega and Manuel Torres

== See also ==
- 2024 in UFC
- List of current UFC fighters
- List of UFC events
