= UFC Fight Night: Pettis vs. Moreno =

UFC mixed martial arts event in 2017

- The poster for UFC Fight Night: Pettis vs. Moreno
- Promotion: Ultimate Fighting Championship
- Date: August 5, 2017
- Venue: Arena Ciudad de México
- City: Mexico City, Mexico
- Attendance: 10,172

Event chronology
UFC 214: Cormier vs Jones 2	UFC Fight Night: Pettis vs. Moreno	UFC Fight Night: Volkov vs. Struve

UFC Fight Night: Pettis vs. Moreno (also known as UFC Fight Night 114) was a mixed martial arts event produced by the Ultimate Fighting Championship held on August 5, 2017, at Arena Ciudad de México in Mexico City, Mexico.

== Background ==
A flyweight bout between Sergio Pettis and Brandon Moreno headlined the event.

Chris Gruetzemacher was expected to face The Ultimate Fighter: Latin America 3 lightweight winner Martín Bravo at the event. However, Gruetzemacher pulled out of the fight on July 18 with an injury and was replaced by promotional newcomer Humberto Bandenay.

A featherweight contest between Hacran Dias and Zabit Magomedsharipov was scheduled to take place at this event, but Magomedsharipov was moved to a fight against Nick Hein at the UFC Fight Night: Struve vs. Volkov event in Rotterdam in September. In turn, Hacran Dias was removed from the card entirely.

At the weigh-ins, Alexa Grasso came in at 119 lb, three pounds over the strawweight limit of 116 lb. As a result, she was fined 20% of her purse, which went to Randa Markos and their bout proceeded at a catchweight.

This was the last event called by longtime color commentator and former fighter Brian Stann.

== Results ==
Main Card (Fox Sports 1)
Weight class				Method	Round	Time	Notes
Flyweight	Sergio Pettis	def.	Brandon Moreno	Decision (unanimous) (49–46, 48–46, 48–46)	5	5:00
Catchweight (119 lb)	Alexa Grasso	def.	Randa Markos	Decision (split) (28–29, 29–28, 29–28)	3	5:00
Welterweight	Niko Price	def	Alan Jouban	TKO (punches)	1	1:44
Featherweight	Humberto Bandenay	def	Martín Bravo	KO (knee)	1	0:26
Middleweight	Sam Alvey	def.	Rashad Evans	Decision (split) (28–29, 29–28, 29–28)	3	5:00
Bantamweight	Alejandro Pérez	def.	Andre Soukhamthath	Decision (split) (28–29, 29–28, 29–28)	3	5:00
Preliminary Card (Fox Sports 1)
Middleweight	Jack Hermansson	def.	Brad Scott	TKO (punches)	1	3:50
Flyweight	Dustin Ortiz	def.	Hector Sandoval	KO (punches)	1	0:15
Bantamweight	Rani Yahya	def.	Henry Briones	Submission (kimura)	1	2:01
Bantamweight	José Alberto Quiñónez	def.	Diego Rivas	Decision (unanimous) (30–27, 30–27, 30–27)	3	5:00
Preliminary Card (UFC Fight Pass)
Flyweight	Joseph Morales	def.	Roberto Sanchez	Submission (rear-naked choke)	1	3:56
Lightweight	Jordan Rinaldi	def.	Álvaro Herrera	Submission (Von Flue choke)	1	2:01

== Bonus awards ==
The following fighters were awarded $50,000 bonuses:

- Fight of the Night: None awarded
- Performance of the Night: Niko Price, Humberto Bandenay, Dustin Ortiz, and Joseph Morales

== Aftermath ==
On November 1, USADA announced a finding of no-fault after Moreno failed a drug test. He tested positive for trace amounts of the banned substance clenbuterol in an in-competition test in the early hours of the event. But after an investigation, USADA determined that the positive likely came from contaminated meat, an issue well known to the anti-doping agency.

With seven first-round finishes, this event ties the record for most first-round finishes in a single UFC event.

== See also ==
- List of UFC events
- 2017 in UFC
