= Mexico City Arena =

Arena in Mexico City, Mexico

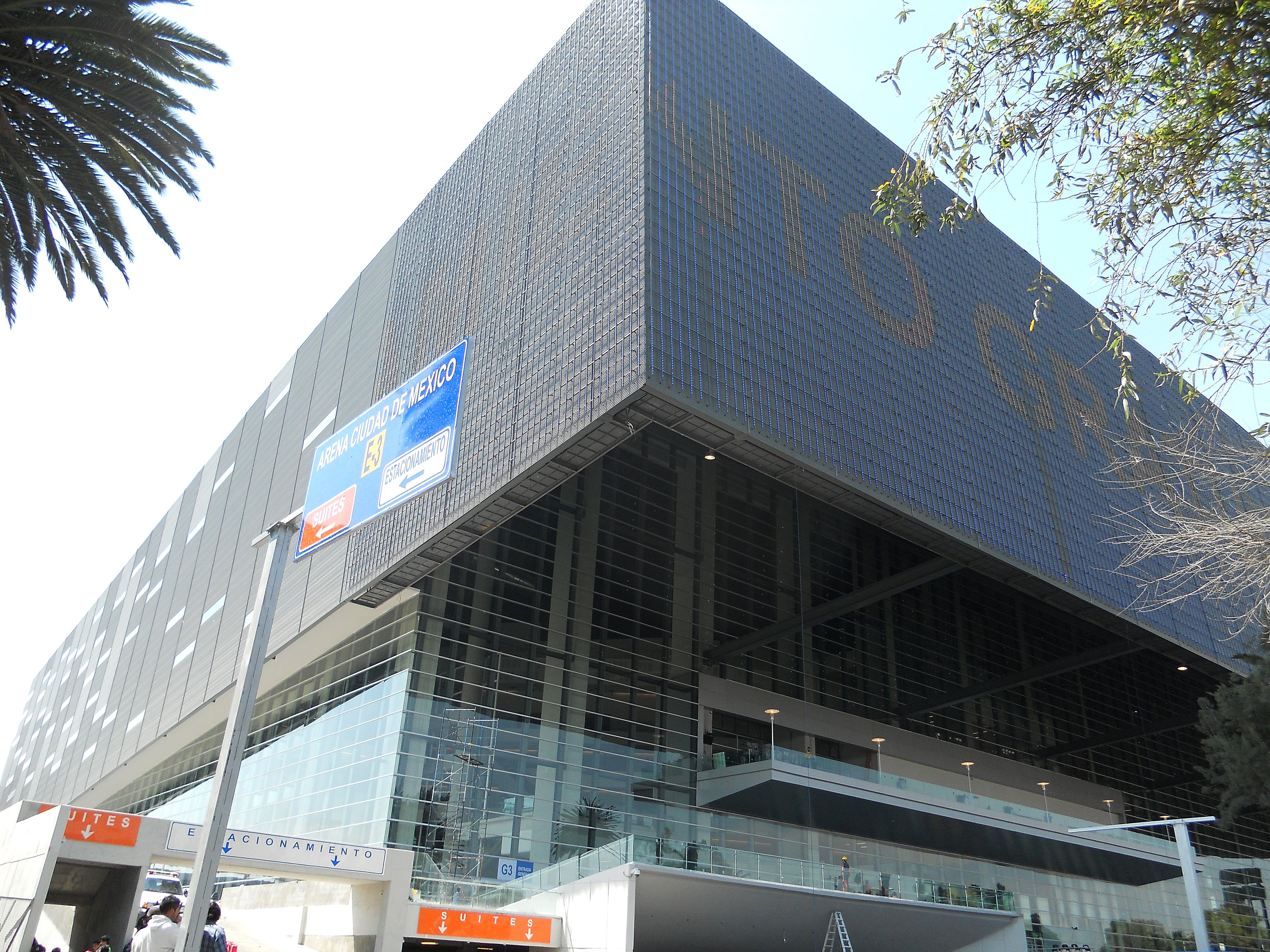
- Interactive map of Mexico City Arena
- Location: Azcapotzalco, Mexico City, Mexico
- Coordinates: 19.497908°N 99.175369°W
- Operator: Zignia Live
- Capacity: 22,300
- Public transit: At distance: Ferrería/Arena Ciudad de México; Fortuna

Construction
- Groundbreaking: March 18, 2009
- Opened: February 25, 2012
- Cost: US$300 million
- Architect: KMD Architects Mexico

Tenant
- Mexico City Capitanes (NBAGL) (2022–present)

Website
- https://arenacdmx.com/

Mexico City Arena (Spanish: Arena Ciudad de México), marketed as Arena CDMX, is an indoor arena in Azcapotzalco, Mexico City, Mexico. It hosts concerts, sports, and other events. It officially opened on February 25, 2012. The total cost of the arena was US$300 million. The arena has a maximum capacity of 22,300 spectators. It is operated by Zignia Live. It is located in Avenida de las Granjas, close to Ferrería metro station, Fortuna railway station of the Suburban Railway, and next to TecMilenio University.

== History ==
The construction began on March 18, 2009, where the Mexico City Mayor, Marcelo Ebrard, was present. The place where the Arena is located used to be the Old Ferreria Cattle Ranch many years ago. It is an 8-hectare land. KMD Architects Mexico was in charge of the design of the Arena along with AVALANZ Group. Construction companies Grupo Garza Ponce, Corey and ADIPPSA are responsible for the development. It is the most up-to-date Arena in Mexico City, the biggest and it is the first arena in the city to have its own parking lot. On November 17, 2010, there was an event that took place in the early construction of the Arena which was called '300 days'. Guillermo Salinas Pliego, head of AVALANZ, promised to finish the project in 300 days. He added "It looks difficult but, the Monterrey Arena was the same and it was finished in nine months". He also talked about the idea sent to KMD Architects for the design of the Arena. He wanted it to "be astonishing on an urban level. Like an icon of the city". The Arena was opened officially with a concert by Mexican singer Luis Miguel on February 25, 2012.

For the construction 5,000 tons of structural steel, 25,000 tons of reinforced steel and 100,000 cubic meters of concrete were used. 225,000 square meters of construction built on an 8 hectare land. The Arena is 45 meters high. It has 2 heliports, a parking lot with capacity of 5,000 cars, 124 luxury suites, 650 security cameras, 850 LCD screens and a capacity of 22,300 people depending on the event. One of the most distinctive things about the Arena are the outdoor LED screen, which has an area of 6,200 square meters, and the indoor screen in the centerhung, with an area of 700 square meters, making both of the screens one of the largest indoor and outdoor displays in the world. Also, 450 meters of digital rings can be seen inside. All of the LED displays are provided by Daktronics.

On February 24, 2012, one day before the official opening, Marcelo Ebrard unveiled the Arena's inauguration plaque. He spoke about the benefits of the Arena, one of them being the 2,500 permanent jobs and the development of Azcapotzalco. On the other hand, Guillermo Salinas mentioned that "this Arena built for the people in Mexico City will modernize the current entertainment infrastructure, because the last place built for that kind of purpose was the Palacio de los Deportes, which was built for the "1968 Summer Olympics".

The arena is frequently used by tours operated by Feld Entertainment. Shows like Disney On Ice, Ringling Brothers and Barnum & Bailey Circus (before its closure) and Monster Jam have used the arena.

Additionally, the NBA has expressed interest in having a team in México, potentially in this arena. On December 4, 2013, a regular-season game between the San Antonio Spurs and Minnesota Timberwolves scheduled at the arena was canceled when a fire from a generator malfunction filled the building with smoke. As a result, their rematch would instead be played at the Target Center. However, the NBA has held games in the arena since then, with the next games coming on January 12 and 14, 2017, with the Phoenix Suns playing against both the Dallas Mavericks and the San Antonio Spurs respectively. The Suns would lose 113–108 to the Mavericks, but win 108–105 against the Spurs. In December 2017, the Brooklyn Nets hosted the Oklahoma City Thunder and Miami Heat at the arena. On December 13, 2018, another NBA Game was held at the arena with Orlando Magic faced the Chicago Bulls Silver was complimentary of the building, and said he hoped other, similar venues would pop up in other parts of the Americas. For the 2019-20 NBA Season, the Dallas Mavericks will play host to the Detroit Pistons and the Phoenix Suns to the San Antonio Spurs.

After considerable delays for the Mexico City Capitanes joining the NBA G League properly and then playing home games in Mexico afterward due to the COVID-19 pandemic, the Capitanes would finally be allowed to play home games in Mexico properly at Mexico City Arena starting in the 2022–23 NBA G League season. While the arena would host up to 22,300 fans easily, the Capitanes are currently limited to only 8,000 total fans on a regular basis due to the smaller standing of the NBA G League.

The men's and women's basketball teams of the American colleges the University of Kansas and University of Houston will play a conference game at the arena in 2024.

== Events ==
The arena has been a frequent host of boxing, mixed martial arts and professional wrestling events. Ultimate Fighting Championships has held eight pay-per-view events at the arena. Lucha Libre AAA Worldwide has held their largest annual show, Triplemanía, at the arena since the twentieth edition in 2012. Events at the arena include:

- Mixed martial arts

- UFC 180: Werdum vs. Hunt – November 15, 2014
- UFC 188: Velasquez vs. Werdum – June 13, 2015
- The Ultimate Fighter Latin America 3 Finale: dos Anjos vs. Ferguson – November 5, 2016
- UFC Fight Night: Pettis vs. Moreno – August 5, 2017
- UFC Fight Night: Rodríguez vs. Stephens – September 21, 2019
- UFC Fight Night: Moreno vs. Royval 2 – February 24, 2024
- UFC on ESPN: Moreno vs. Erceg – March 29, 2025
- UFC Fight Night: Moreno vs. Kavanagh – February 28, 2026

- Professional wrestling

- Triplemanía XX – August 5, 2012
- Triplemanía XXI – June 16, 2013
- Triplemanía XXII – August 17, 2014
- Triplemanía XXIII – August 9, 2015
- Triplemanía XXIV – August 28, 2016
- Triplemanía XXV – August 26, 2017
- Triplemanía XXVI – August 25, 2018
- Triplemanía XXVII – August 3, 2019
- Triplemanía XXVIII – December 12, 2020 (This was the first Triplemania without an audience due to the COVID-19 pandemic.)
- Triplemanía XXIX – August 14, 2021
- Triplemanía XXX - October 15, 2022
- Triplemanía XXXI - August 12, 2023
- Triplemanía XXXII - August 17, 2024
- Triplemanía XXXIII - August 16, 2025 (This was the first Triplemania held under WWE's ownership of AAA).
- Triplemanía XXXIV - September 13, 2026 (Night 2)

WWE held SmackDown on September 11, 2026 and RAW on September 14, 2026. It will be the first time in 15 years they have held a weekly show in Mexico.

The largest attended event this far was the boxing match between Juan Manuel Márquez and Sergey Fedchenko of the World Boxing Organization light welterweight championship on April 14, 2012.

Irish pop band Westlife concert for their The Wild Dreams Tour on March 22, 2024.

The venue also hosted the Miss Universe 2024 pageant on November 16.

== Gallery ==
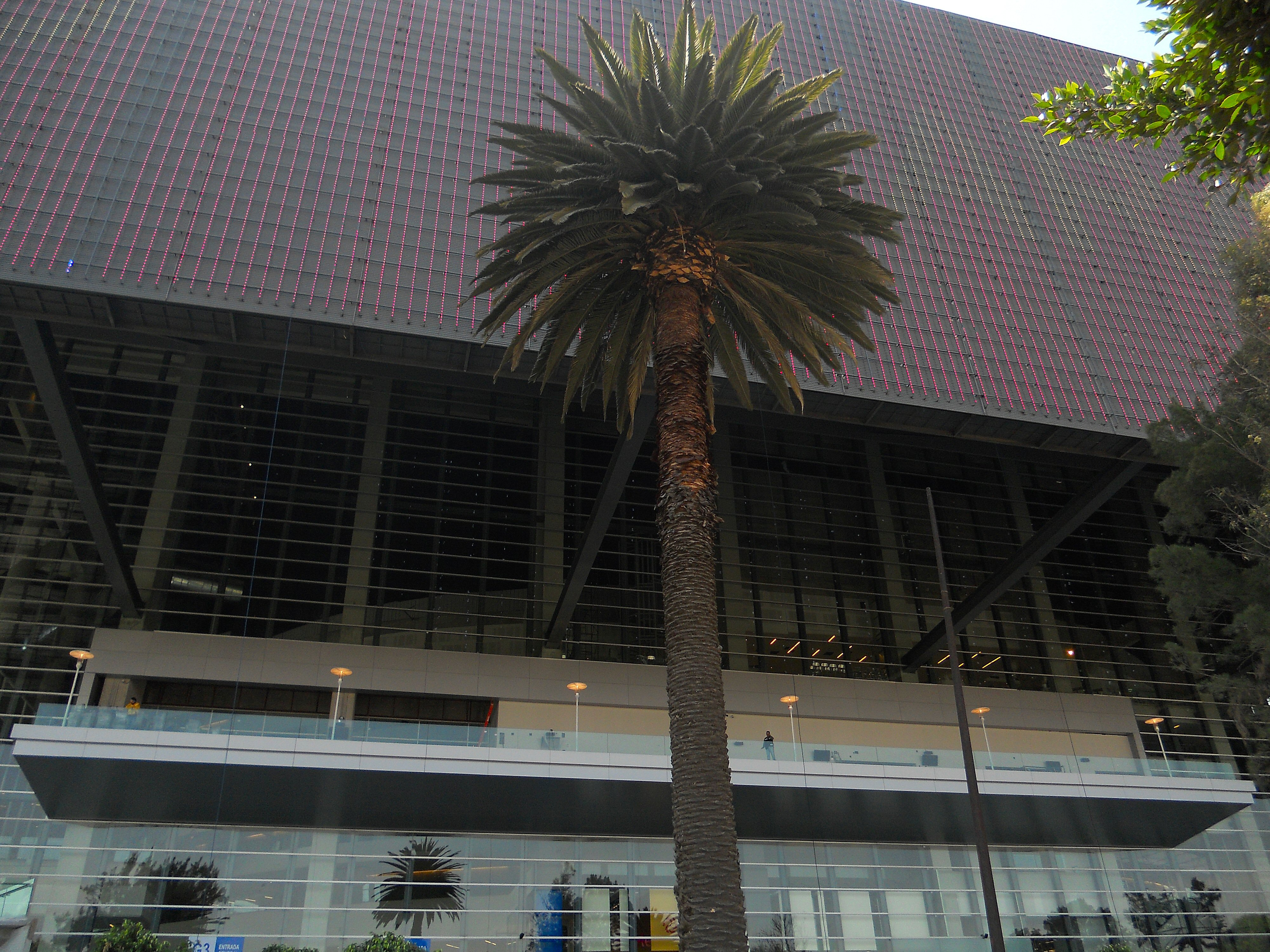
Main entrance, bar terrace and outdoor LED screen

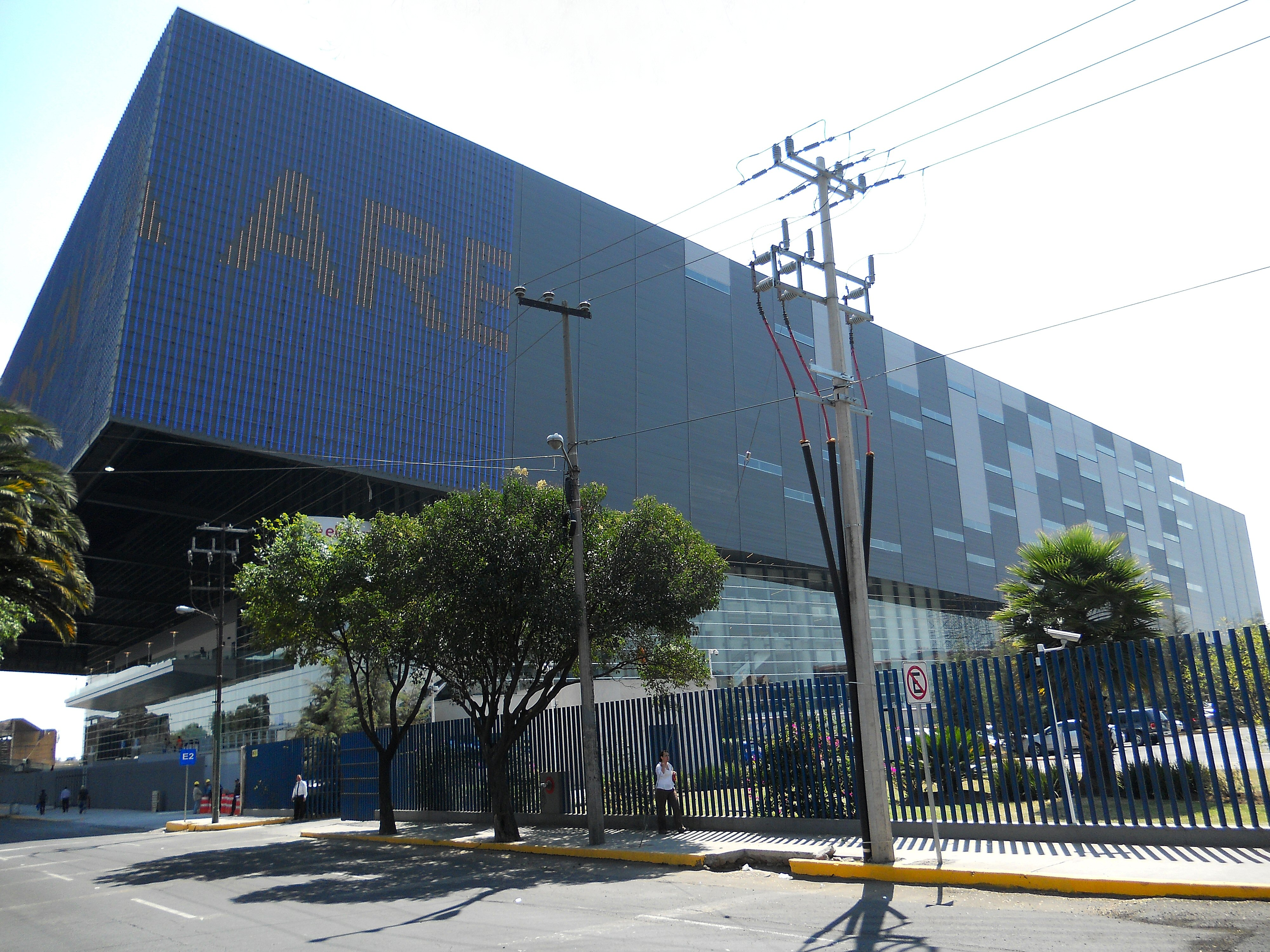
Outside view of the Arena

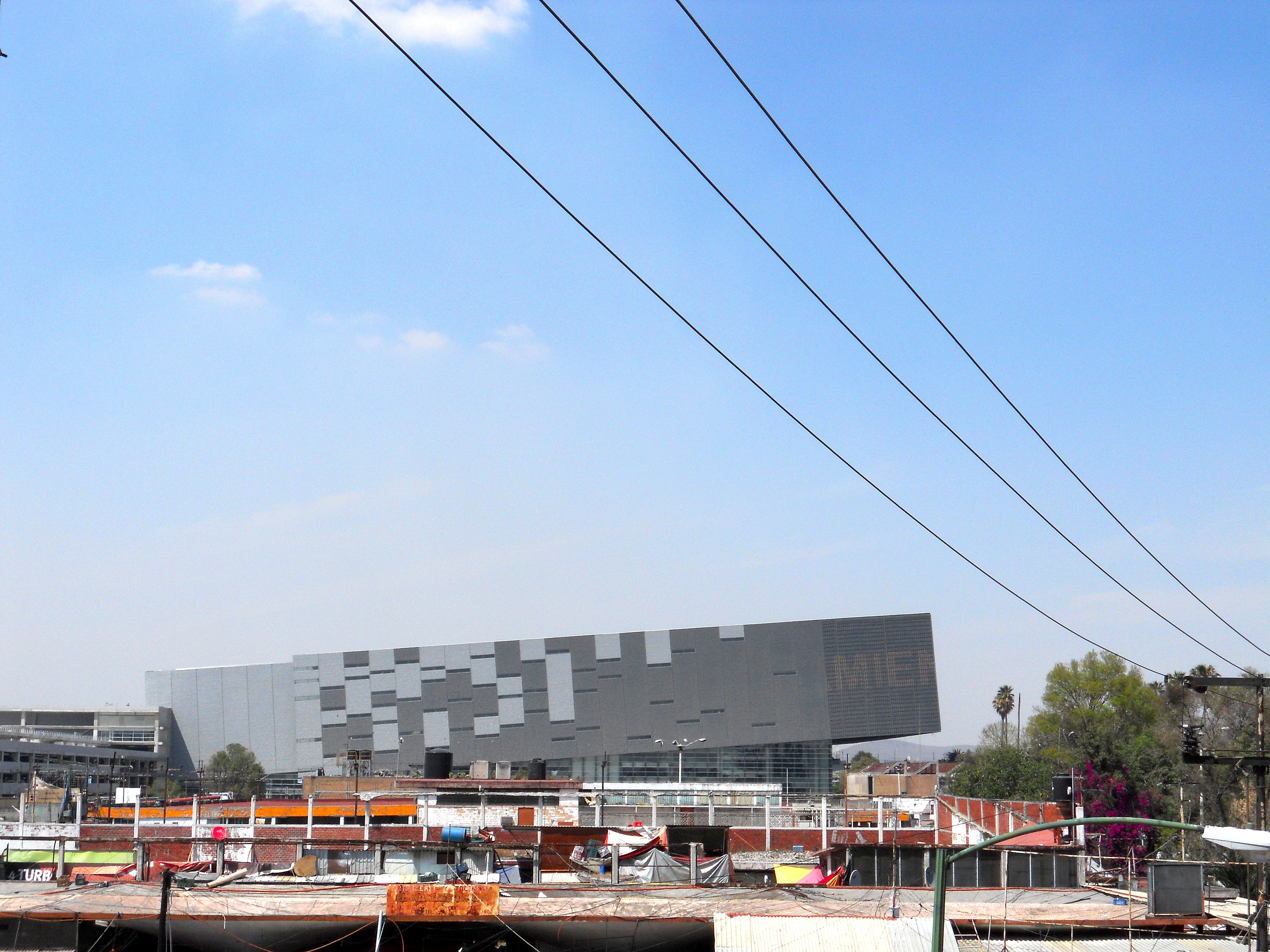
The Arena from a pedestrian bridge

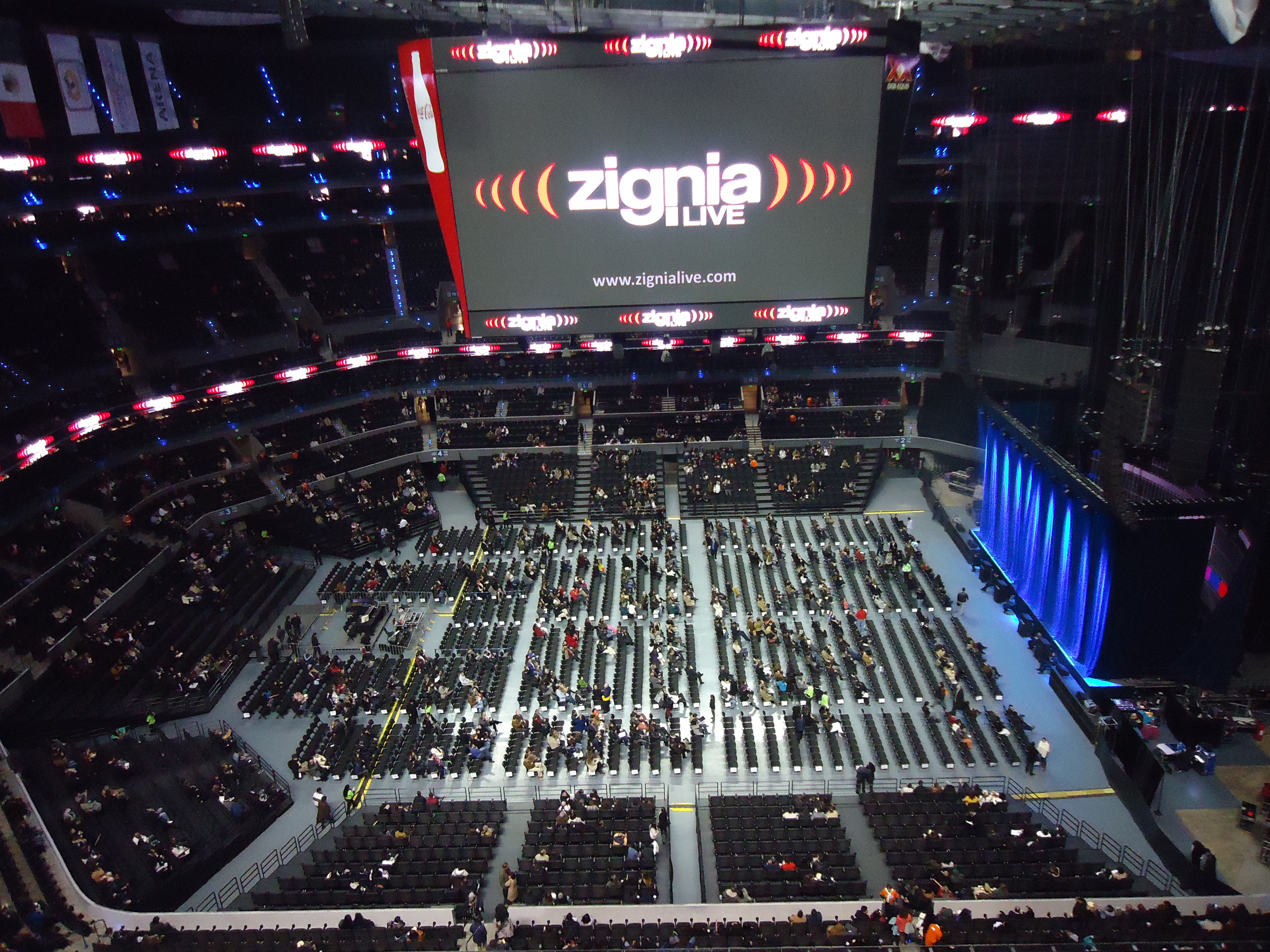
Inside view of the Arena

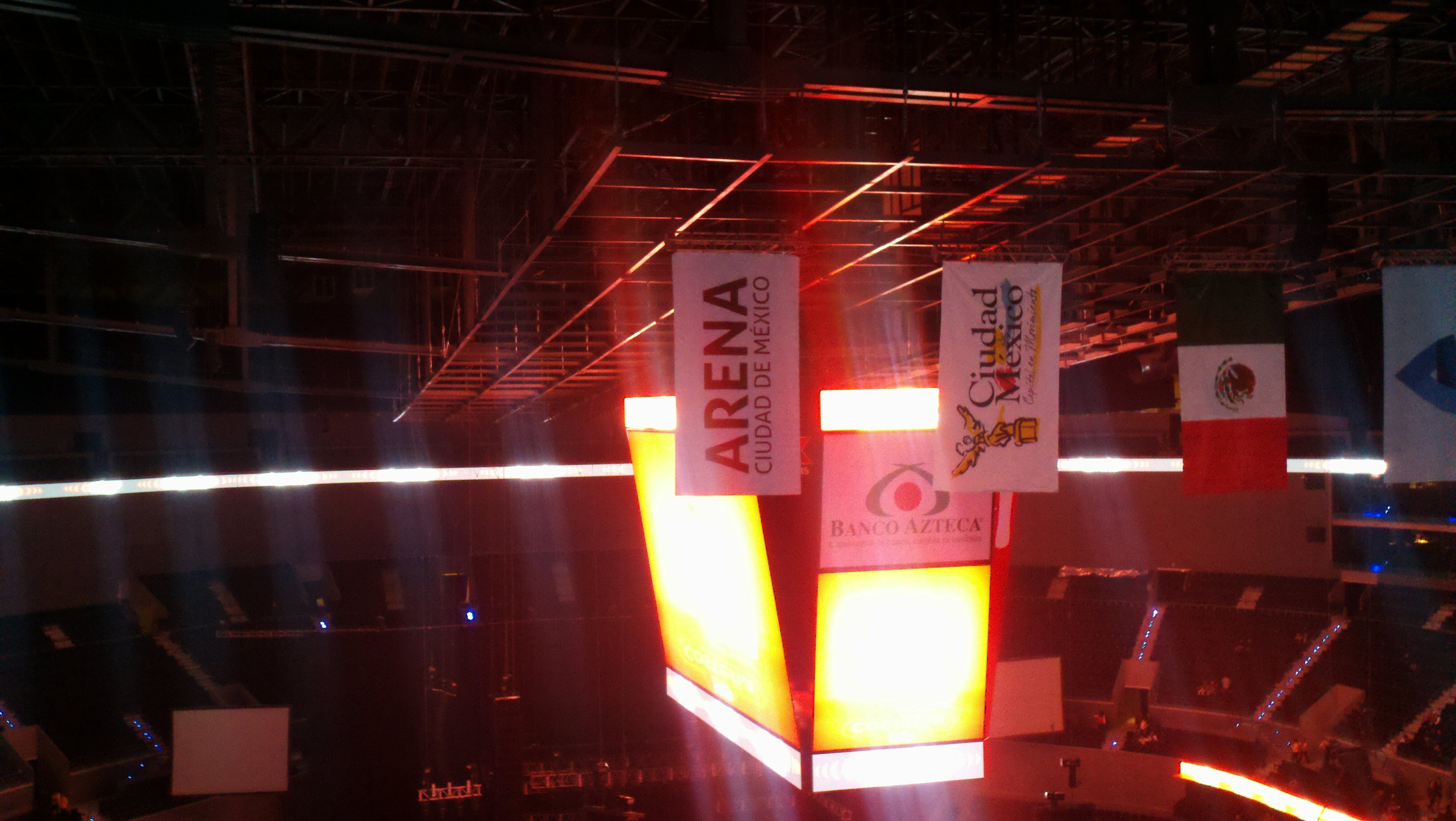
Indoor LED screen

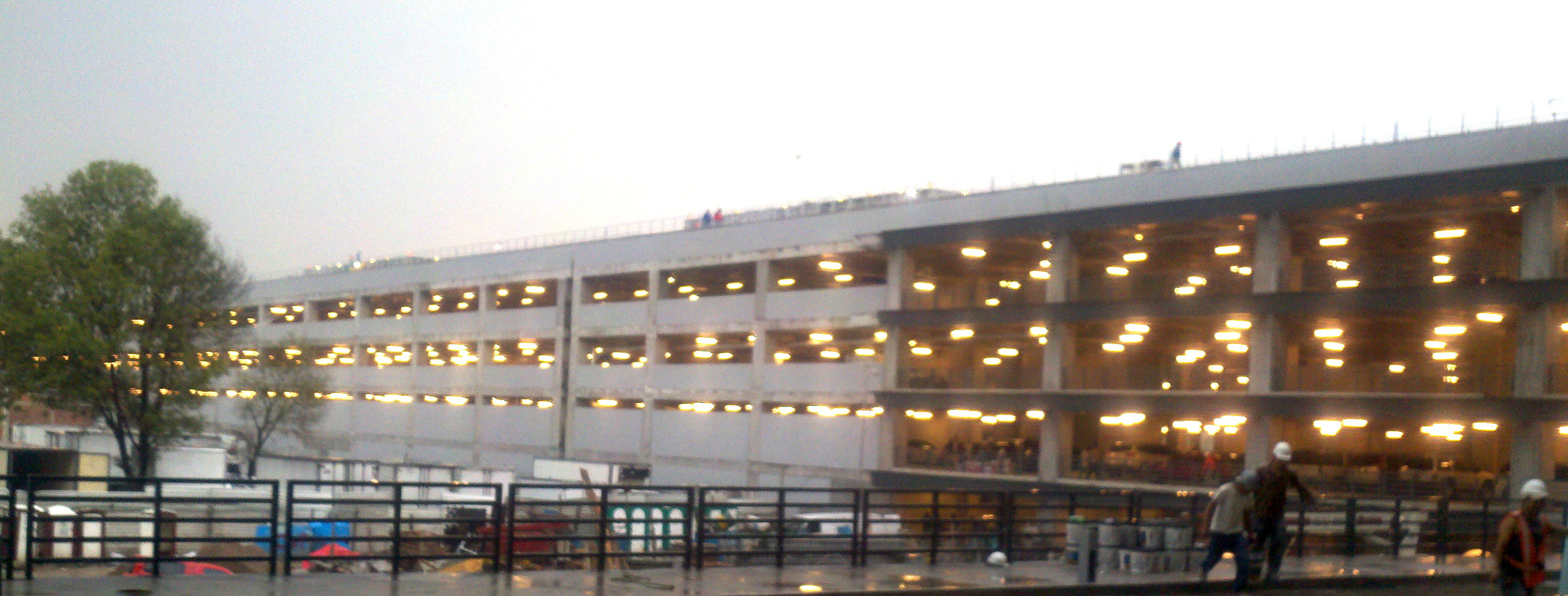
Parking lot

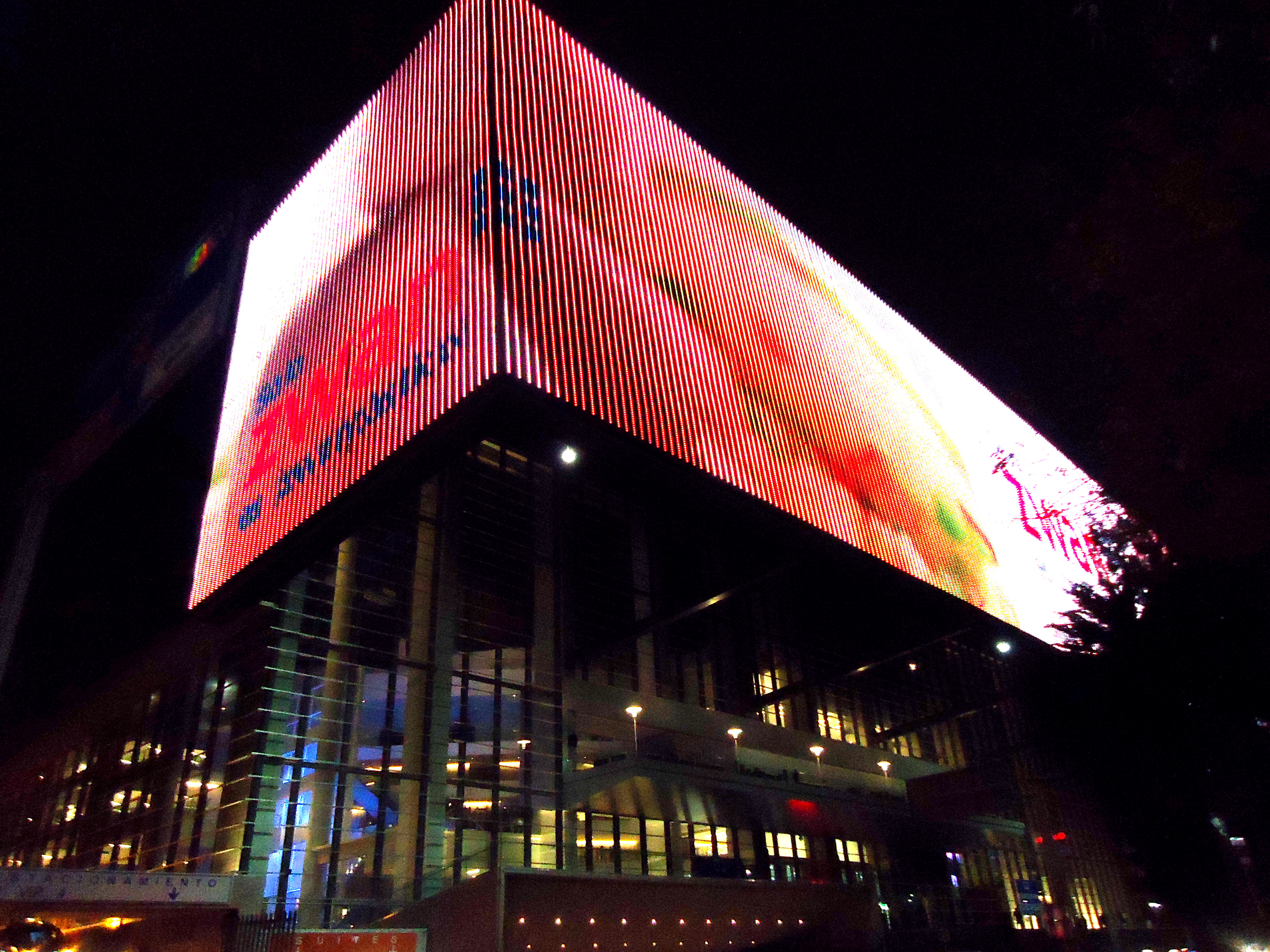
The outdoor LED screen of Mexico City Arena at night

== See also ==
Preceded by National Gymnasium (El Salvador) San Salvador	Miss Universe venue 2024	Succeeded by Impact Challenger Hall; Bangkok
