= José Alberto Quiñónez =

Mexican mixed martial artist

- Born: José Alberto Quiñónez Navarro; July 28, 1990 (age 36); Tlaltenango, Zacatecas, Mexico
- Other names: El Teco
- Height: 5 ft 8 in (1.73 m)
- Weight: 61 kg (134 lb; 9 st 8 lb)
- Division: Bantamweight
- Reach: 69 in (175 cm)
- Style: Wrestling, Boxing, BJJ
- Fighting out of: Tijuana, Baja California, Mexico
- Team: La academia “Delincuentes MMA” Alliance MMA; Entram Gym; Jackson MMA
- Trainer: Raul Arvizu
- Years active: 2014–present

Mixed martial arts record
- Total: 20
- Wins: 12
- By knockout: 3
- By submission: 2
- By decision: 7
- Losses: 8
- By knockout: 3
- By submission: 3
- By decision: 2

Other information
- Spouse: Jazmín Navarrete (m. 2024)
- Mixed martial arts record from Sherdog

José Alberto Quiñónez Navarro (born July 28, 1990) is a Mexican mixed martial artist who competes in the Bantamweight division. He was one of the cast members in The Ultimate Fighter: Latin America 1, The Ultimate Fighter UFC TV reality show in August 2014, He formerly competed in the Ultimate Fighting Championship (UFC).

== Background ==
Quiñónez was born in Tlaltenango de Sánchez Román in the state of Zacatecas, Mexico. He was interested and involved in soccer when he was young where he tried out for Estudiantes Tecos and Pachuca soccer teams. He transitioned to train in mixed martial arts when he was a teenager together with his brother Cristian, starting out in boxing and jiu jitsu and later in MMA. Quiñónez got the entrance to UFC when he was selected as one of the contestants in The Ultimate Fighter: Latin America 1, The Ultimate Fighter UFC TV reality series.

Quiñónez was a waiter prior becoming a professional MMA fighter.

== Mixed martial arts career ==
=== Early career ===
Quiñónez fought all his fights in the Mexico circuit and amassed a record of 3-1 prior joining UFC.

=== The Ultimate Fighter: Latin America 1 ===
Quiñónez was selected as one of the contestants for the Bantamweight division of The Ultimate Fighter: Latin America 1, The Ultimate Fighter UFC TV reality series, under Team Cain Velasquez in August 2014.

In elimination round, Quiñónez defeated Bentley Syler by TKO in round one. He next faced Marco Beltrán in the semifinals and won by unanimous decision. He moved on to face Alejandro Pérez on UFC 180 for the title belt.

=== Ultimate Fighting Championship ===
Quiñónez made his promotional debut on November 15, 2014, at UFC 180. He faced Alejandro Pérez in the finals for The Ultimate Fighter: Latin America 1 in Mexico City, Mexico. He was defeated by Pérez via unanimous decision with the score board of (29–26, 29–26, 28–27). This was the first fight between two Mexicans inside the UFC octagon.

He next faced Leonardo Morales on June 6, 2015, at UFC Fight Night: Boetsch vs. Henderson. He submitted Morales at 2:34 minutes into round one via rear-naked choke. After the fight, Quiñónez stated he would not want to fight another Hispanic fighters again as the promotion cut Morales from the roster after Morales lost the fight to him.

After a 15 months hiatus due to a knee injury, Quiñónez returned to face Joey Gomez on September 17, 2016, at UFC Fight Night: Poirier vs. Johnson. After three round bout, Quiñónez outpointed Gomez and the judges awarded the win to Quiñónez via unanimous decision (29–28, 30–27, 30–27).

Quiñónez faced Diego Rivas in UFC Fight Night: Pettis vs. Moreno on August 5, 2017. He won the fight by unanimous decision.

Quiñónez faced Teruto Ishihara on February 10, 2018, at UFC 221. He won the fight via unanimous decision.

Quiñónez was scheduled to face Sean O'Malley on October 6, 2018, at UFC 229. However, O'Malley was pulled from the fight on September 30 after failing a USADA drug test. In turn, promotion officials elected to remove Quiñónez from the card and he will be rescheduled for a future event.

Quiñónez faced Nathaniel Wood on 16 March 2019 at UFC Fight Night 147. He lost the fight via a rear-naked choke submission in the second round.

Quiñónez faced Carlos Huachin on September 21, 2019, at UFC on ESPN+ 17. He won the fight by unanimous decision.

Quiñónez faced Sean O'Malley on March 7, 2020, at UFC 248. He lost the fight via TKO in the first round.

Quiñónez was scheduled to face Louis Smolka on November 14, 2020, at UFC Fight Night 182. At the weigh-ins, Smolka weighed in at 139 pounds, three pounds over the bantamweight non-title fight limit. The bout will proceed at catchweight and Smolka was fined 20 percent of his purse, which will go to Quiñónez. Smolka pulled out of their fights the next day as consequence of the weigh-cut and those bouts were canceled. The bout was left intact and eventually took place at UFC on ESPN 19 on December 5, 2020. Quiñónez lost the fight via technical knockout in round two.

On March 2, 2021, it was announced that Quiñónez was released from the UFC.

=== Fight at XFC ===
Quiñónez faced Andre Soukhamthath at XFC 44 on May 28, 2021. He won the bout via unanimous decision.

=== Budo Sento Championship ===
In 2022, Quiñónez would compete again in his homeland, this time under contract with the Budo Sento Championship promotion. He was scheduled to face Javier Guzmán on December 9 of that year at BSC Vol. 12. He won the fight via TKO in the first round.

Quiñónez then faced Víctor Madrigal for the BSC Bantamweight Championship on April 21, 2023, at BSC Vol. 14. However, he failed in his bid to capture the title, losing via TKO in the first round.

=== LUX Fight League ===
In 2023, Quiñónez would make his way to LUX Fight League, where he faced Jonas Ortega on November 24 at LUX 037. He won the fight via unanimous decision.

Quiñónez faced Édgar Delgado Jiménez for the LUX Featherweight Championship on June 28, 2024, at LUX 043. He lost the fight via submission in the first round after failing to break a heel hook.

=== Return to Budo SC ===
Quiñónez returned to Budo Sento when he was scheduled to face Erik Pérez on November 28, 2025, at BSC Vol. 32 in a match for the symbolic "Legends" belt. However, he lost by unanimous decision.

== Personal life ==
Quiñónez grew up in a "tough" neighborhood, as he has declared. Although, he never liked violence, and he always stayed out of trouble. He practiced football and soccer during all his childhood, until he was a teenager, where he started training boxing. His moniker " El Teco" coined after now defunct Estudiantes Tecos football team in Mexico.

Quiñónez is currently in a relationship with Chilean MMA fighter Jazmín Navarrete.

Quiñónez distinctive mustache was the idea came from his friend and UFC fighter Yair Rodriguez, where now he has shaved it to signify a restart of his MMA career.

Quiñónez looks up to Dominick Cruz, who he trains with at Alliance MMA gym in California, where he stated he wanted to achieve the level of fighting skills and to adopt the philosophy that of Cruz's. His hobbies are reading, and hiking in nature: Exploring lakes, mountains, forests.

== Mixed martial arts record ==
Professional record breakdown
20 matches	12 wins	8 losses
By knockout	3	3
By submission	2	3
By decision	7	2

Res.	Record	Opponent	Method	Event	Date	Round	Time	Location	Notes
Loss	12–8	Erik Pérez	Decision (unanimous)	Budo Sento Championship 32	November 28, 2025	5	5:00	Monterrey, Mexico	For the vacant BSC Featherweight Championship.
Loss	12–7	Édgar Delgado Jiménez	Submission (heel hook)	LUX 043	June 28, 2024	1	4:18	Zacatecas, Mexico	For the LUX Featherweight Championship.
Win	12–6	Jonas Ortega	Decision (unanimous)	LUX 037	November 24, 2023	3	5:00	Zacatecas, Mexico	Featherweight debut.
Loss	11–6	Victor Hugo Madrigal	Submission (rear-naked choke)	Budo Sento Championship 14	April 21, 2023	1	1:22	Mexico City, Mexico	For the BSC Bantamweight Championship.
Win	11–5	Javier Guzman	TKO (punches)	Budo Sento Championship 12	December 9, 2022	1	2:55	Mexico City, Mexico	
Win	10–5	Andre Soukhamthath	Decision (unanimous)	XFC 44	May 28, 2021	3	5:00	Des Moines, Iowa, United States	
Loss	9–5	Louis Smolka	TKO (punches)	UFC on ESPN: Hermansson vs. Vettori	December 5, 2020	2	2:15	Las Vegas, Nevada, United States	
Loss	9–4	Sean O'Malley	TKO (head kick and punches)	UFC 248	March 7, 2020	1	2:02	Las Vegas, Nevada, United States	
Win	9–3	Carlos Huachin	Decision (unanimous)	UFC Fight Night: Rodríguez vs. Stephens	September 21, 2019	3	5:00	Mexico City, Mexico	
Loss	8–3	Nathaniel Wood	Submission (rear-naked choke)	UFC Fight Night: Till vs. Masvidal	March 16, 2019	2	2:46	London, England	
Win	8–2	Teruto Ishihara	Decision (unanimous)	UFC 221	February 11, 2018	3	5:00	Perth, Australia	
Win	7–2	Diego Rivas	Decision (unanimous)	UFC Fight Night: Pettis vs. Moreno	August 5, 2017	3	5:00	Mexico City, Mexico	
Win	6–2	Joey Gomez	Decision (unanimous)	UFC Fight Night: Poirier vs. Johnson	September 17, 2016	3	5:00	Hidalgo, Texas, United States	
Win	5–2	Leonardo Morales	Submission (rear-naked choke)	UFC Fight Night: Boetsch vs. Henderson	June 6, 2015	1	2:34	New Orleans, Louisiana, United States	Catchweight (137 lb) bout; Morales missed weight.
Loss	4–2	Alejandro Pérez	Decision (unanimous)	UFC 180	November 15, 2014	3	5:00	Mexico City, Mexico	The Ultimate Fighter: Latin America Bantamweight Tournament Final. Quiñónez was deducted two points in round 3 due to a headbutt.
Loss	4–1	Davi Ramos	TKO (punches)	Extreme Fight Academy: Mexico vs. Brazil	November 15, 2013	1	2:38	Tuxtla Gutierrez, Mexico	
Win	4–0	Jorge Gamboa	TKO (punches)	Combate Extremo: Teco vs. Gamboa	October 5, 2013	1	2:25	Monterrey, Mexico	
Win	3–0	Alejandro Pérez	Decision (unanimous)	Fight Club Mexico 3	August 2, 2013	3	5:00	Aguascalientes, Mexico	
Win	2–0	Daniel Langarcia	Submission (rear-naked choke)	Fight Hard Championship 3	May 11, 2013	1	N/A	Guadalajara, Mexico	
Win	1–0	Alexis Gallardo	TKO (punches)	Fight Club Mexico 2	March 16, 2013	1	1:31	Aguascalientes, Mexico	Bantamweight debut.

== Muay Thai record ==
Muay Thai record
0 Wins, 1 Losses, 0 Draw
Date	Result	Opponent	Event	Location	Method	Round	Time
2026-07-27	Loss	(Israel) Kibedy Gordon	Gordon Fight Nights 1	Tel Aviv, Israel	KO (head kick and knee)	1	0:57
Legend: Win Loss Draw/No contest Notes

== See also ==
- List of male mixed martial artists
- List of Mexican UFC fighters
