= Martin Bravo =

Mexican mixed martial artist (born 1993)

Martín Bravo
- Born: 21 September 1993 (age 33); Rosarito, Baja California, Mexico
- Other names: El Toro
- Height: 5 ft 8 in (1.73 m)
- Weight: 145.5 lb (66.0 kg; 10.39 st)
- Division: Lightweight; Featherweight; Bantamweight
- Reach: 71 1/2 in (182 cm)
- Fighting out of: Rosarito, Baja California, Mexico
- Team: Entram Gym (until 2021); Nick Diaz Academy (2021–present)
- Rank: Purple belt in Brazilian Jiu-Jitsu
- Years active: 2012–present

Mixed martial arts record
- Total: 17
- Wins: 13
- By knockout: 5
- By submission: 6
- By decision: 2
- Losses: 4
- By knockout: 3
- By decision: 1

Other information
- Mixed martial arts record from Sherdog

Martín Bravo (born 21 September 1993) is a Mexican mixed martial artist who competes in the Featherweight division of Combate Global. He has previously competed for the Ultimate Fighting Championship.

== Mixed martial arts career ==
=== Early career ===
Bravo made his professional MMA debut in April 2012 in his native Mexico. Over the next four years, he amassed an undefeated record of 10–0 with all but two of his wins coming by way of stoppage.

=== The Ultimate Fighter Latin America 3 ===
In 2016, it was announced that Bravo would compete on the third season of The Ultimate Fighter Latin America series.

In the elimination round, Bravo defeated Javier Ganin by TKO due to a knee injury in the first round. He was selected to represent Team Griffin under head coach Forrest Griffin. In the quarterfinals, Bravo defeated Ilianovich Chalo by unanimous decision. In the semifinals, he defeated Leonardo Rodríguez by unanimous decision. This win earned him a spot in the finale against fellow finalist Claudio Puelles.

=== Ultimate Fighting Championship ===
Bravo made his official UFC debut against Claudio Puelles on November 5, 2016, in Mexico City, Mexico at The Ultimate Fighter Latin America 3 Finale. He won the fight via TKO in the second round in order to be crowned the Lightweight tournament title winner.

In his second fight for the promotion, Bravo faced Humberto Bandenay on August 5, 2017, at UFC Fight Night: Pettis vs. Moreno. He lost the fight via knockout in the first round.

Bravo faced Alex Caceres on July 6, 2018, at The Ultimate Fighter 27 Finale. He lost the fight via split decision. This fight earned him the Fight of the Night award.

Bravo faced Steven Peterson on September 21, 2019, at UFC on ESPN+ 17. He lost the fight by knockout via a spinning back fist in the second round.

Bravo was released by the UFC on February 11, 2020.

=== Combate Global ===
Bravo signed a multifight deal with Combate Global and is expected to make his debut in the main event of Combate Global: Bravo vs. Whitney on September 17, 2021. He won the bout via TKO in the first round.

Bravo faced Jose Estrada on December 3, 2021, at Combate Global: Estrada vs. Bravo. He won the bout within the first round via armbar.

Bravo next faced the undefeated Jose Ferreira on June 18, 2023, at Combate Global: Gomez vs. Somers. He would lose the fight via third-round technical knockout.

== Championships and accomplishments ==
- Ultimate Fighting Championship
  - The Ultimate Fighter: Latin America 3 Lightweight Tournament Winner
  - Fight of the Night (one time) vs Alex Caceres

== Mixed martial arts record ==
Professional record breakdown
17 matches	13 wins	4 losses
By knockout	5	3
By submission	6	0
By decision	2	1

Res.	Record	Opponent	Method	Event	Date	Round	Time	Location	Notes
Loss	13–4	Jose Ferreira	TKO (punches)	Combate Global: Gomez vs Somers	June 18, 2023	3	1:58	Miami, Florida, United States	
Win	13–3	Jose Estrada	Submission (armbar)	Combate: Bravo vs. Estrada	December 3, 2021	1	1:14	Miami, Florida, United States	
Win	12–3	Andrew Whitney	TKO (punches)	Combate: Bravo vs. Whitney	September 17, 2021	1	1:09	Miami, Florida, United States	
Loss	11–3	Steven Peterson	KO (spinning back fist)	UFC Fight Night: Rodríguez vs. Stephens	September 21, 2019	2	1:31	Mexico City, Mexico	
Loss	11–2	Alex Caceres	Decision (split)	The Ultimate Fighter: Undefeated Finale	July 6, 2018	3	5:00	Las Vegas, Nevada, United States	Fight of the Night.
Loss	11–1	Humberto Bandenay	KO (knee)	UFC Fight Night: Pettis vs. Moreno	August 5, 2017	1	0:26	Mexico City, Mexico	Return to Featherweight.
Win	11–0	Claudio Puelles	TKO (punches)	The Ultimate Fighter Latin America 3 Finale: dos Anjos vs. Ferguson	November 5, 2016	2	1:55	Mexico City, Mexico	Won The Ultimate Fighter: Latin America 3 Lightweight Tournament.
Win	10–0	Dallys Moraes Gama	Decision (unanimous)	Jungle Fight 81	September 12, 2015	3	5:00	Palmas, Brazil	
Win	9–0	Fernando Moya Li	Submission (rear-naked choke)	Calvo Promotions 6	July 23, 2015	1	1:52	San José, Costa Rica	Return to Featherweight.
Win	8–0	David Suruy	Submission (rear-naked choke)	UWC EVT 14	June 27, 2015	1	2:05	Tijuana, Mexico	Bantamweight debut.
Win	7–0	Tito Castro	TKO (punches)	Xtreme Kombat 30	May 30, 2015	2	N/A	Guadalajara, Mexico	
Win	6–0	Jose Ruelas	Submission (rear-naked choke)	Pro XFC 1	February 6, 2015	3	4:32	Tijuana, Mexico	Featherweight debut.
Win	5–0	Angel Cruz	Submission (guillotine choke)	Baja Cage Fighting: Beach Fights	September 20, 2014	2	1:03	Rosarito, Mexico	
Win	4–0	Jaime Flores	TKO (corner stoppage)	UWC EVT: Duarte vs. Beristain	May 17, 2014	2	1:46	Tijuana, Mexico	
Win	3–0	Eduardo Garcia	Decision (unanimous)	UWC Mexico: New Blood 2	April 28, 2013	3	5:00	Tijuana, Mexico	
Win	2–0	Victor Borrayo	Submission (armbar)	UWC Mexico 13: Benitez vs. Oropeza	March 2, 2013	1	1:43	Tijuana, Mexico	
Win	1–0	Abrahan Gallegos	TKO (punches)	BCF 3: Battle on the Beach	April 28, 2012	1	3:57	Rosarito, Mexico	

=== Mixed martial arts exhibition record ===
Exhibition record breakdown		
3 matches	3 wins	0 losses
By knockout	1	0
By decision	2	0

Res.	Record	Opponent	Method	Event	Date	Round	Time	Location	Notes
Win	3–0	Leonardo Rodríguez	Decision (unanimous)	The Ultimate Fighter: Latin America 3	Jun 11, 2016	3	5:00	Buenos Aires, Argentina	The Ultimate Fighter: Latin America 3 Semi-final round.
Win	2–0	Ilianovich Chalo	Decision (unanimous)	The Ultimate Fighter: Latin America 3	Jun 4, 2016	2	5:00	Buenos Aires, Argentina	The Ultimate Fighter: Latin America 3 Quarterfinal round.
Win	1–0	Javier Ganin	TKO (Knee Injury)	The Ultimate Fighter: Latin America 3	May 28, 2016	1	N/A	Buenos Aires, Argentina	The Ultimate Fighter: Latin America 3 Elimination round.

== See also ==
- List of Mexican UFC fighters
- List of male mixed martial artists
