= Erik Pérez =

Mexican mixed martial arts fighter (born 1989)

- Born: Erik Gregorio Pérez Ruvalcaba; November 19, 1989 (age 37); Guadalupe, Nuevo León, Mexico
- Other names: Goyito
- Height: 5 ft 7 in (1.70 m)
- Weight: 145 lb (66 kg; 10 st 5 lb)
- Division: Bantamweight
- Reach: 68 in (170 cm)
- Stance: Orthodox
- Fighting out of: San Diego, California, U.S
- Team: Alliance MMA
- Years active: 2008–present

Mixed martial arts record
- Total: 31
- Wins: 22
- By knockout: 5
- By submission: 8
- By decision: 9
- Losses: 9
- By knockout: 1
- By submission: 2
- By decision: 6

Other information
- Notable relatives: Iván Pérez (brother); Jair Pérez (brother); Jorge Pérez (brother)
- Mixed martial arts record from Sherdog

Erik Gregorio Pérez Ruvalcaba (born November 19, 1989) is a Mexican mixed martial artist who competes in the Bantamweight division. A professional competitor since 2008, he has competed for Bellator MMA, Shark Fights, BAMMA, UFC and Combate Americas.

== Personal life ==
Erik Pérez was born in Guadalupe, Nuevo León, Mexico. He grew from a family of sportsmen; his older brother Jorge Pérez is a professional boxer, while his brothers Iván, and Jair both are fellow mixed martial artists. Érik, Iván, and Jair all three fought together in Combate Americas.

== Mixed martial arts career ==
=== Ultimate Fighting Championship ===
Upon his permanent move to United States, Erik Pérez established a full-time training camp at Jackson's MMA in Albuquerque, New Mexico.

Pérez faced John Albert on June 1, 2012, at The Ultimate Fighter 15 Finale replacing Byron Bloodworth who was removed from the bout. Pérez won the fight via controversial armbar submission as Albert did not appear to verbally submit or tap out but the fight was stopped by referee Kim Winslow.

Pérez next faced Ken Stone on August 11, 2012, at UFC 150. He won via first-round KO in 17 seconds. With this win, Pérez obtained the fastest Bantamweight knockout in UFC and WEC Bantamweight history, beating Damacio Page's 18-second KO over Marcos Galvao.

Pérez fought Byron Bloodworth on December 29, 2012, at UFC 155. He won the fight via TKO in the first round.

Pérez was expected to face Johnny Bedford on April 27, 2013, at UFC 159. However, Pérez pulled out of the bout just days before the event citing an injury and was replaced by Bryan Caraway.

Pérez faced Takeya Mizugaki on August 28, 2013, at UFC Fight Night 27 He lost the fight via split decision.

Pérez next faced Edwin Figueroa at UFC 167. He won the fight via unanimous decision.

Pérez faced Bryan Caraway on June 7, 2014, at UFC Fight Night 42. He lost the fight via rear-naked choke submission in the second round.

Pérez was expected to face Marcus Brimage on November 15, 2014, at UFC 180. However, Pérez pulled out of the bout in mid-October citing a shoulder injury.

Pérez was briefly linked to a fight with Damian Stasiak on November 21, 2015, at The Ultimate Fighter Latin America 2 Finale. However, Stasiak was removed from the bout and replaced by Taylor Lapilus. He won the fight by unanimous decision.

Pérez next faced Francisco Rivera on July 30, 2016, at UFC 201. He won the back-and-forth fight by unanimous decision.

Pérez faced Felipe Arantes on November 5, 2016, at The Ultimate Fighter Latin America 3 Finale. He was awarded a split decision victory.

Perez signed with Combate Americas on October 31, 2017, after fighting out his contract with the UFC.

=== Combate Americas ===
Following his departure from the UFC, Pérez signed a multi-fight contract with Combate Americas. On March 15, 2018, it was announced that Pérez would be fighting against top-ranked fighter in Texas, David "DJ" Fuentes. The fight took place on April 20, and Erik won the fight by knockout.

Pérez was expected to headline Combate Americas: Mexico vs. USA against John Castañeda on October 13, 2018, but the bout was postponed to a later date because Castaneda caught staph infection.

Pérez then headlined Combate Americas: Combate Monterrey on November 17, 2018, against Andres Ayala. He won the fight via rear-naked choke in the first round.

=== Bellator MMA ===
Following a two-fight stint at Combate Americas, Pérez signed a multi-fight deal with Bellator MMA.

Pérez made his promotional debut against Toby Misech at Bellator 236 on December 20, 2019. He lost the fight via knockout in the first round.

Pérez faced Josh Hill at Bellator 244 on August 21, 2020. He lost the fight by unanimous decision.

Pérez was expected to face Brian Moore at Bellator 258 on May 7, 2021. However, Moore tested positive for COVID and pulled out of the bout. He was replaced by Blaine Shutt. Pérez won the bout via unanimous decision.

Pérez was scheduled to face Brett Johns on October 16, 2021, at Bellator 268. However, on October 5, it was announced that Perez was injured and the bout was scrapped.

Pérez, replacing Jared Scoggins, was scheduled to face Cee Jay Hamilton on April 22, 2022, at Bellator 278. Pérez in turn pulled out of the bout and Hamilton was not rescheduled, instead being paid his show money, despite not weighing in or fighting.

Pérez faced Enrique Barzola on March 10, 2023, at Bellator 292. He lost the fight by unanimous decision.

=== Budo Sento Championship ===
In Budo Sento Championship, Pérez faced José Alberto Quiñónez on November 28, 2025, at BSC Vol. 32, which was his first fight in over two years. The result was a unanimous decision in his favor, also earning him the symbolic "Legends" belt.

== Championships and accomplishments ==
=== Mixed martial arts ===
- Ultimate Fighting Championship
  - Fastest knockout in UFC Bantamweight division history (0:17) (vs. Ken Stone)
  - Fourth highest takedown accuracy percentage in UFC Bantamweight division history (55.9%)
  - Sixth highest significant strike defense in UFC Bantamweight division history (66.7%)
  - Seventh fewest strikes absorbed-per-minute in UFC Bantamweight division history (2.09)
  - UFC.com Awards
    - 2012: Ranked #2 Newcomer of the Year
- Budo Sento Championship
  - Budo SC "Legend" title (one time, current)
- MMA México
  - MMA México Featherweight Championship (one time, current)

== Mixed martial arts record ==
Professional record breakdown
31 matches	22 wins	9 losses
By knockout	5	1
By submission	8	2
By decision	9	6

Res.	Record	Opponent	Method	Event	Date	Round	Time	Location	Notes
Win	22–9	Abraham Canavati	Decision (unanimous)	MMA Mexico 8	June 27, 2026	3	5:00	Monterrey, Mexico	Won the vacant MMA Mexico Featherweight Championship.
Win	21–9	José Alberto Quiñónez	Decision (unanimous)	Budo Sento Championship 32	November 28, 2025	5	5:00	Monterrey, Mexico	Won the Budo SC "Legend" Championship.
Loss	20–9	Enrique Barzola	Decision (unanimous)	Bellator 292	March 10, 2023	3	5:00	San Jose, California, United States	Featherweight debut.
Win	20–8	Blaine Shutt	Decision (unanimous)	Bellator 258	May 7, 2021	3	5:00	Uncasville, Connecticut, United States	
Loss	19–8	Josh Hill	Decision (unanimous)	Bellator 244	August 21, 2020	3	5:00	Uncasville, Connecticut, United States	
Loss	19–7	Toby Misech	KO (punches)	Bellator 235	December 20, 2019	1	0:54	Honolulu, Hawaii, United States	Catchweight (141.4 lbs) bout; Misech missed weight.
Win	19–6	Andres Ayala	Submission (rear-naked choke)	Combate Americas: Monterrey	November 17, 2018	1	3:39	Monterrey, Mexico	
Win	18–6	David Fuentes	KO (punches)	Combate Americas: Estrellas 2	April 20, 2018	3	1:22	Monterrey, Mexico	
Win	17–6	Felipe Arantes	Decision (split)	The Ultimate Fighter Latin America 3 Finale: dos Anjos vs. Ferguson	November 5, 2016	3	5:00	Mexico City, Mexico	
Win	16–6	Francisco Rivera	Decision (unanimous)	UFC 201	July 30, 2016	3	5:00	Atlanta, Georgia, United States	
Win	15–6	Taylor Lapilus	Decision (unanimous)	The Ultimate Fighter Latin America 2 Finale: Magny vs. Gastelum	November 21, 2015	3	5:00	Monterrey, Mexico	
Loss	14–6	Bryan Caraway	Submission (rear-naked choke)	UFC Fight Night: Henderson vs. Khabilov	June 7, 2014	2	1:52	Albuquerque, New Mexico, United States	
Win	14–5	Edwin Figueroa	Decision (unanimous)	UFC 167	November 16, 2013	3	5:00	Las Vegas, Nevada, United States	
Loss	13–5	Takeya Mizugaki	Decision (split)	UFC Fight Night: Condit vs. Kampmann 2	August 28, 2013	3	5:00	Indianapolis, Indiana, United States	
Win	13–4	Byron Bloodworth	TKO (punches)	UFC 155	December 29, 2012	1	3:50	Las Vegas, Nevada, United States	
Win	12–4	Ken Stone	KO (punch)	UFC 150	August 11, 2012	1	0:17	Denver, Colorado, United States	
Win	11–4	John Albert	Technical Submission (armbar)	The Ultimate Fighter: Live Finale	June 1, 2012	1	4:18	Las Vegas, Nevada, United States	
Win	10–4	Paul McVeigh	Decision (unanimous)	BAMMA 8	December 10, 2011	3	5:00	Nottingham, England	
Win	9–4	James Brum	Submission (rear-naked choke)	BAMMA 7	September 10, 2011	1	3:31	Birmingham, England	Catchweight (140 lbs) bout.
Win	8–4	Douglas Frey	Decision (unanimous)	Shark Fights 17	July 15, 2011	3	5:00	Frisco, Texas, United States	Catchweight (150 lbs) bout.
Win	7–4	Jesse Thorton	Submission (rear-naked choke)	South Texas FC 15	April 15, 2011	2	2:34	McAllen, Texas, United States	
Win	6–4	France Atala	Submission (rear-naked choke)	Triple A Promotions	March 12, 2011	1	1:53	Laredo, Texas, United States	
Loss	5–4	Jason Sampson	Decision (split)	South Texas FC 12	September 3, 2010	3	5:00	McAllen, Texas, United States	
Loss	5–3	David Fuentes	Submission (armbar)	South Texas FC 11	May 28, 2010	3	3:01	McAllen, Texas, United States	
Win	5–2	Jeremiah Castillo	Submission (armbar)	Southwest Cage Association: Duke City Fall Brawl 2	November 25, 2009	1	2:23	Albuquerque, New Mexico, United States	
Win	4–2	Fabian Jacquez	Submission (rear-naked choke)	Duke City MMA Series 2	July 25, 2009	1	0:55	Albuquerque, New Mexico, United States	
Win	3–2	Albert Martinez	TKO (punches)	South Texas FC 6	April 11, 2009	1	2:17	Odessa, Texas, United States	
Win	2–2	Sabino Becerra	Submission (triangle choke)	South Texas FC 4	November 1, 2008	1	3:29	McAllen, Texas, United States	
Win	1–2	Josh Scales	TKO (punches)	South Texas FC 3	August 2, 2008	1	1:09	McAllen, Texas, United States	
Loss	0–2	Alfredo Morales	Decision (split)	Warriors FC 1	June 28, 2008	3	3:00	Mexico City, Mexico	
Loss	0–1	Tim Snyder	Decision (split)	South Texas FC 2	May 3, 2008	3	N/A	Edinburg, Texas, United States	Bantamweight debut.

== Karate Combat record ==
Res.	Record	Opponent	Method	Event	Date	Round	Time	Location	Notes
Loss	1-1	Adam Noi	Decision (unanimous)	Karate Combat 49	September 18, 2024	3	3:00	Singapore	
Win	1-0	Eoghan Chelmiah	Decision (split)	Karate Combat 44	February 23, 2024	3	3:00	Mexico city, Mexico	

== See also ==
- List of male mixed martial artists
- List of Mexican UFC fighters
