= UFC 188 =

UFC mixed martial arts event in 2015

UFC 188: Velasquez vs. Werdum
- The poster for UFC 188: Velasquez vs. Werdum
- Promotion: Ultimate Fighting Championship
- Date: June 13, 2015
- Venue: Arena Ciudad de México
- City: Mexico City, Mexico
- Attendance: 21,036
- Buyrate: 300,000

Event chronology
UFC Fight Night: Boetsch vs. Henderson	UFC 188: Velasquez vs. Werdum	UFC Fight Night: Jędrzejczyk vs. Penne

UFC 188: Velasquez vs. Werdum was a mixed martial arts event held on June 13, 2015, at Arena Ciudad de México in Mexico City, Mexico.

== Background ==
The event was headlined by a UFC Heavyweight Championship unification bout between current champion Cain Velasquez and interim champion Fabrício Werdum. The bout was originally expected to take place at UFC 180. However, Velasquez pulled out of the bout due to a knee injury and the event was instead headlined by an interim title bout between Werdum and Mark Hunt.

A lightweight bout between Francisco Treviño and Johnny Case was originally expected to take place at UFC Fight Night: McGregor vs. Siver. However, on December 23, it was announced that Trevino had to pull out of the bout due to an injury. The fight was later rescheduled for this event.

Héctor Urbina was expected to face Albert Tumenov at the event. However, Urbina was forced to pull out of the fight due to an arm injury and was replaced by promotional newcomer Andrew Todhunter. The bout was then cancelled altogether on June 11 after Todhunter was medically disqualified from the card (and subsequently released from the promotion) after dealing with issues while cutting weight. Tumenov will receive his contracted show money.

On July 6, it was announced that Gilbert Melendez tested positive for testosterone metabolites of an exogenous origin. He denied using anything, but stated that he is "responsible for the products he uses and their implications". Melendez was suspended one year, effective from the date of his bout against Eddie Alvarez. As a result of the suspension, he was pulled from his fight against Al Iaquinta at UFC Fight Night: Mir vs. Duffee on July 15. On July 17, Augusto Montaño was announced as another fighter who tested positive for the same metabolites as Melendez. He was also suspended for a year.

== Results ==
Main Card
Weight class				Method	Round	Time	Notes
Heavyweight	Fabrício Werdum (ic)	def.	Cain Velasquez (c)	Submission (guillotine choke)	3	2:13	(Note: UFC Heavyweight Championship unification bout.)
Lightweight	Eddie Alvarez	def.	Gilbert Melendez	Decision (split) (29–28, 28–29, 29–28)	3	5:00
Middleweight	Kelvin Gastelum	def.	Nate Marquardt	TKO (corner stoppage)	2	5:00
Featherweight	Yair Rodríguez	def.	Charles Rosa	Decision (split) (28–29, 29–28, 29–28)	3	5:00
Women's Strawweight	Tecia Torres	def.	Angela Hill	Decision (unanimous) (30–27, 30–27, 29–28)	3	5:00
Preliminary Card (FX)
Flyweight	Henry Cejudo	def.	Chico Camus	Decision (unanimous) (29–28, 30–27, 30–27)	3	5:00
Lightweight	Efraín Escudero	def.	Drew Dober	Submission (standing guillotine choke)	1	0:54
Bantamweight	Patrick Williams	def.	Alejandro Pérez	Technical Submission (standing guillotine choke)	1	0:23
Lightweight	Johnny Case	def.	Francisco Treviño	Decision (unanimous) (30–27, 30–27, 30–27)	3	5:00
Preliminary Card (UFC Fight Pass)
Welterweight	Cathal Pendred	def.	Augusto Montaño	Decision (unanimous) (29–28, 29–28, 29–28)	3	5:00
Featherweight	Gabriel Benítez	def.	Clay Collard	Decision (unanimous) (30–27, 30–27, 30–27)	3	5:00

== Bonus awards ==
The following fighters were awarded $50,000 bonuses:

- Fight of the Night: Yair Rodríguez vs. Charles Rosa
- Performances of the Night: Patrick Williams and Fabrício Werdum

== See also ==
- List of UFC events
- 2015 in UFC
