= UFC Fight Night: Boetsch vs. Henderson =

UFC mixed martial arts event in 2015

- The poster for UFC Fight Night: Boetsch vs. Henderson
- Promotion: Ultimate Fighting Championship
- Date: June 6, 2015
- Venue: Smoothie King Center
- City: New Orleans, Louisiana
- Attendance: 6,231
- Total gate: $621,523

Event chronology
UFC Fight Night: Condit vs. Alves	UFC Fight Night: Boetsch vs. Henderson	UFC 188: Velasquez vs. Werdum

UFC Fight Night: Boetsch vs. Henderson (also known as UFC Fight Night 68) was a mixed martial arts event held on June 6, 2015, at the Smoothie King Center in New Orleans, Louisiana.

== Background ==
The event was expected to be headlined by a light heavyweight bout between top contenders Daniel Cormier and Ryan Bader. However on April 28, due to Jon Jones' hit-and-run incident leading up to his fight at UFC 187 against Anthony Johnson, the UFC decided to strip him of the UFC Light Heavyweight Championship and suspend him indefinitely. Jones was replaced by Cormier. In turn, a middleweight bout between Tim Boetsch and mixed martial arts legend Dan Henderson was promoted to the main event. Subsequently, Bader was pulled from the event entirely.

A bantamweight bout between Joe Soto and Anthony Birchak was originally expected to take place at UFC 177. However, on the day of weigh ins, Soto was pulled from the fight to replace Renan Barão in a UFC Bantamweight Championship bout against champion T.J. Dillashaw, as Barão had to be admitted to the hospital as a result of his attempts to cut weight. Birchak was removed from the card entirely. The fight was later rescheduled for this event.

Alan Jouban was expected to face Brian Ebersole at the event. However, Jouban pulled out of the fight in late March citing injury and was replaced by Omari Akhmedov.

Zubaira Tukhugov was expected to face Thiago Tavares at the event. However on April 25, it was announced that Tukhugov had to pull out of the fight due to an undisclosed injury. Brian Ortega was announced as his replacement on May 6.

Daniel Sarafian was expected to face Ricardo Abreu at this event. However on May 4, Sarafian was forced to withdraw from the event due to injury and was replaced by Jake Collier.

Both Yancy Medeiros and Leonardo Morales missed weight on their first attempts at the weigh-ins, coming in at 159.5 lb and 140 lb respectively. They were both given additional time to make the weight limits for their respective weight classes, but Medeiros made no attempts to cut further. Morales would miss weight again on his second attempt, coming in at 137 lb. As a result, they were both fined 20 percent of their fight purses, which went to Dustin Poirier and José Alberto Quiñónez respectively.

With seven first-round finishes, this event ties the record for most first-round finishes in a single UFC event.

== Results ==
Main Card (Fox Sports 1)
Weight class				Method	Round	Time	Notes
Middleweight	Dan Henderson	def.	Tim Boetsch	KO (punches)	1	0:28
Heavyweight	Ben Rothwell	def.	Matt Mitrione	Submission (guillotine choke)	1	1:54
Catchweight (159.5 lb)	Dustin Poirier	def.	Yancy Medeiros	TKO (body kick and punches)	1	2:38
Featherweight	Brian Ortega	def.	Thiago Tavares	TKO (punches)	3	4:10
Bantamweight	Anthony Birchak	def.	Joe Soto	KO (punches)	1	1:37
Bantamweight	Francisco Rivera	def.	Alex Caceres	KO (punches)	1	0:21
Preliminary Card (Fox Sports 1)
Heavyweight	Shawn Jordan	def.	Derrick Lewis	TKO (hook kick and punches)	2	0:48
Welterweight	Omari Akhmedov	def.	Brian Ebersole	TKO (knee injury)	1	5:00
Lightweight	Chris Wade	def.	Christos Giagos	Decision (unanimous) (29–28, 29–28, 30–27)	3	5:00
Lightweight	Joe Proctor	def.	Justin Edwards	Technical Submission (guillotine choke)	3	4:58
Preliminary Card (UFC Fight Pass)
Middleweight	Jake Collier	def.	Ricardo Abreu	Decision (split) (29–28, 28–29, 29–28)	3	5:00
Catchweight (137 lb)	José Alberto Quiñónez	def.	Leonardo Morales	Submission (rear-naked choke)	1	2:34

== Bonus awards ==
The following fighters were awarded $50,000 bonuses:

- Fight of the Night: Brian Ortega vs. Thiago Tavares
- Performance of the Night: Dustin Poirier and Shawn Jordan

== See also ==
- List of UFC events
- 2015 in UFC
