= Alex Caceres =

American mixed martial artist (born 1988)

- Born: Alex Caceres; June 20, 1988 (age 38); Miami, Florida, U.S.
- Other names: Bruce Leeroy
- Height: 5 ft 9 in (175 cm)
- Weight: 145 lb (66 kg; 10.4 st)
- Division: Bantamweight; Featherweight; Lightweight
- Reach: 73 1/2 in (187 cm)
- Stance: Southpaw
- Fighting out of: Miami, Florida, U.S.
- Team: Freedom Fighters MMA (2019–present); MMA Lab (2013–2019)
- Years active: 2008–present

Mixed martial arts record
- Total: 37
- Wins: 21
- By knockout: 4
- By submission: 7
- By decision: 10
- Losses: 15
- By knockout: 1
- By submission: 7
- By decision: 7
- No contests: 1

Other information
- Mixed martial arts record from Sherdog

Alex Caceres (born June 20, 1988) is an American professional mixed martial artist who competed in the Featherweight division of the Ultimate Fighting Championship (UFC). A professional since 2008, Caceres mostly competed in his regional circuit, before signing with the UFC to appear on The Ultimate Fighter: Team GSP vs. Team Koscheck.

== Mixed martial arts career ==
=== Background ===
Caceres comes from Miami, Florida, where he trains at Young Tigers Foundation. Caceres claims to be "inventive and creative" during the fights, often smiling during competition. Caceres also never went the distance in any of his fights prior to joining the TUF cast. Caceres' nickname, "Bruce Leeroy" stems from the character in the film The Last Dragon.

=== Early career ===
Caceres initially fought in an underground backyard street fighting organization in Miami. Caceres mostly appeared in promotions based in Florida. Amongst these was an appearance for the King of the Cage promotion at "King of the Cage: Hurricane" in February 2009. His opponent in that fight was Eric Kovarik, who was coming off multiple consecutive losses. In under two minutes, Caceres submitted his opponent with a rear naked choke.

Caceres then won his next fight against Joel Garcia in May 2009 via submission (triangle choke) early in the first round before going on a two-fight losing streak. These two losses were both by armbar, taking his record to 4-2 at that time.

In his final fight before joining The Ultimate Fighter, Caceres defeated Jahmal McLennan via TKO midway through the third round to snap his losing streak.

=== The Ultimate Fighter ===
Caceres then signed with the Ultimate Fighting Championship to appear on The Ultimate Fighter: Team GSP vs. Team Koscheck.

In the debut episode, Caceres faced Paul Barrow, who was 3-0 going into the show. Caceres, who smiled almost the entire fight, would go to defeat Barrow via submission (rear naked choke) in the first round.

In the second episode, Caceres was picked as GSP's fourth pick (eighth overall). Caceres competed in his preliminary round fight during this episode against Jeff Lentz. Prior to the fight, Lentz's cardio was called into question due to his smoking and drinking. However, Lentz went on to arguably win the first round of the fight against Caceres. Midway through the second round, Caceres locked in a triangle choke, forcing the tapout and advancing him into the quarter-finals.

In episode 8, Team GSP had to pick which team members would fight each other (considering they had 5 members in the quarter-finals). St. Pierre asked each member to pick the fighter they would prefer to fight. Both Caceres and Michael Johnson picked each other and they were scheduled to fight. Johnson defeated Caceres via unanimous decision (20-18, 20-18, 20-18) after two rounds in episode 10.

=== Ultimate Fighting Championship ===
Caceres made his official debut in March 2011 against Mackens Semerzier at UFC Fight Night: Nogueira vs. Davis. He lost the fight via submission in the first round.

Caceres was expected to face Leonard Garcia August 14, 2011, at UFC Live: Hardy vs. Lytle. However, Garcia was forced out of the bout with an injury and replaced by promotional newcomer Jimy Hettes. Caceres was submitted with a rear naked choke at 3:12 of round 2.

Caceres then dropped to the bantamweight division and faced former WEC Bantamweight champion Cole Escovedo on November 12, 2011, at UFC on Fox 1. Caceres won via unanimous decision in a bout where he showed a vastly improved striking and ground game.

Caceres faced Edwin Figueroa on February 4, 2012, at UFC 143 but lost the fight in a split decision. Caceres was docked two points by referee Herb Dean for 2 groin strikes.

Caceres next faced Damacio Page on July 11, 2012, at UFC on Fuel TV: Munoz vs. Weidman. He won the fight via submission in the second round. The finish also earned him the Submission of the Night honors.

Caceres was expected to face promotional newcomer Kang Kyung-ho on November 10, 2012, at UFC on Fuel TV 6. However, Kang was forced out of the bout with an injury and was replaced by promotional newcomer Motonobu Tezuka. Caceres defeated the UFC newcomer by split decision.

The fight with Kang was rescheduled for March 3, 2013, at UFC on Fuel TV 8. Caceres won the back-and-forth fight via split decision. On March 20, 2013, it was announced that Caceres had failed his post fight drug test, testing positive for marijuana. Caceres was subsequently suspended for six months, retroactive to March 3, 2013, and his win over Kang was changed to a No Contest.

Caceres next faced Roland Delorme on September 21, 2013, at UFC 165. He displayed good striking skills and takedown defense, winning the fight via split decision.

Caceres was expected to face Mitch Gagnon on December 7, 2013, at UFC Fight Night 33. However, the bout was scrapped during the week leading up to the event due to an alleged visa issue for Gagnon, restricting his entry to Australia.

Caceres faced Sergio Pettis on January 25, 2014, at UFC on Fox 10. He won the back-and-forth fight by rear-naked choke submission at 4:49 of the third round. The win also earned Caceres his first Fight of the Night and second Submission of the Night bonus awards.

For his tenth fight with the promotion, Caceres faced Urijah Faber at UFC 175 on July 5, 2014. He lost the fight via a rear-naked choke submission in the third round.

Caceres faced promotional newcomer Masanori Kanehara on September 20, 2014, at UFC Fight Night 52. He lost the fight via unanimous decision.

Cacares faced Francisco Rivera on June 6, 2015, at UFC Fight Night 68. He lost the fight via knockout in the first round, marking the first time he has ever been knocked out in his career.

Caceres faced Masio Fullen in a featherweight bout on January 30, 2016, at UFC on Fox 18. He won the fight via unanimous decision.

Caceres next faced Cole Miller on June 4, 2016, at UFC 199. He won the fight via unanimous decision.

Caceres faced Yair Rodríguez in the main event on August 6, 2016, at UFC Fight Night 92. He lost the fight by split decision. The fight was named Fight of the Night and both fighters were awarded a $50,000 bonus.

Caceres would next face Jason Knight on January 28, 2017, at UFC on Fox 23. He lost by submission in the second round.

Caceres faced promotional newcomer Rolando Dy on June 17, 2017, at UFC Fight Night: Holm vs. Correia. Caceres came in strong in round one, knocking Dy off his feet. A brief timeout was called by the referee in round two to check Dy's eye and the fight continued. However, the referee halted the fight at the end of round two due to a doctor's recommendation regarding Dy's eye injury. Dy was noticeably upset by the decision of the referee and Caceres was awarded the win by TKO.

The bout with Wang Guan was rescheduled and eventually took place on November 25, 2017, at UFC Fight Night: Silva vs. Gastelum Caceres lost the back-and-forth fight via split decision.

Caceres was scheduled to face Artem Lobov on April 7, 2018, at UFC 223, but the fight was cancelled due to Lobov's involvement with the Team McGregor bus melee.

Caceres faced Martin Bravo on July 6, 2018, at The Ultimate Fighter 27 Finale. He won the fight via split decision. This win earned him the Fight of the Night award.

Caceres faced promotional newcomer Kron Gracie on February 17, 2019, at UFC on ESPN 1. He lost the fight via submission due to a rear-naked choke in the first round.

Caceres faced Steven Peterson on July 20, 2019, at UFC on ESPN 4. He won the fight via unanimous decision.

Caceres faced Chase Hooper on June 6, 2020, at UFC 250. He won the bout via unanimous decision.

Caceres was scheduled to face Giga Chikadze on August 29, 2020, at UFC Fight Night 175. However, Chikadze withdrew from the bout due to tested positive for COVID-19 and he was briefly replaced by promotional newcomer Kevin Croom. Subsequently on the following day, Croom was removed and replaced by Austin Springer. At the weigh-ins, Springer weighed in at 151 pounds, five pounds over the featherweight non-title fight limit. The bout proceeded at catchweight and Springer was fined 30% of his purse which went to Caceres. Caceres won the fight by submission in the first round.

Caceres faced Kevin Croom on February 27, 2021, at UFC Fight Night: Rozenstruik vs. Gane. He won the fight via unanimous decision.

Caceres faced Seung Woo Choi on October 23, 2021, at UFC Fight Night 196. After surviving an early knockdown and illegal knee, Caceres went on to win the fight via rear-naked choke submission in round two. This win earned him Performance of the Night award.

Caceres faced Sodiq Yusuff on March 12, 2022, at UFC Fight Night 203. Caceres lost the bout via unanimous decision.

Caceres faced Julian Erosa on December 17, 2022, at UFC Fight Night 216. He won the fight via technical knockout in round one. This win earned him the Performance of the Night award.

Caceres was scheduled to face Nate Landwehr on March 25, 2023, at UFC on ESPN 43. However, Caceres withdrew due to an undisclosed reason and was replaced by Austin Lingo.

Caceres faced Daniel Pineda on June 3, 2023, at UFC on ESPN 46. He won the fight via unanimous decision. The win also earned Caceres his fourth Fight of the Night bonus award.

Caceres faced Giga Chikadze on August 26, 2023, at UFC Fight Night 225. He lost the bout via unanimous decision.

Caceres faced Sean Woodson on May 11, 2024, at UFC on ESPN 56. He lost the fight by unanimous decision. 11 out of 14 media outlets scored the fight for Caceres.

On May 19, 2025, it was reported that Caceres had signed with Dirty Boxing thus ending his career with the UFC.

== Dirty Boxing Career ==
in June 2025, Caceres debuted with Mike Perry's "Dirty Boxing Championship" promotion, facing Saidyokub Kakhramonov at Dirty Boxing Championship 2. He lost via unanimous decision.

Caceres faced Shawn West at Dirty Boxing Championship 3, winning via TKO in the second round, with one second left on the timer.

== Personal life ==
Growing up the son of a drug dealer, Caceres grew up in a less affluent neighborhood having a tough upbringing. When his father went to prison, he was molested by a rival drug dealer of his father's. These turmoils led his family to move to a more affluent suburb. He is Cuban and Dominican.

Caceres was influenced by the documentary Forks Over Knives. He is vegan. He has an interest in spirituality.

== Championships and accomplishments ==
=== Mixed martial arts ===
- Ultimate Fighting Championship
  - Fight of the Night (Four times) vs. Sergio Pettis, Yair Rodríguez, Martín Bravo and Daniel Pineda
  - Performance of the Night (Two times) vs. Seung Woo Choi and Julian Erosa
  - Submission of the Night (Two times) vs. Damacio Page and Sergio Pettis
  - Fifth most bouts in UFC Featherweight division history (20)
  - UFC.com Awards
    - 2014: Ranked #4 Upset of the Year vs. Sergio Pettis
- MMA Junkie
  - 2014 January Submission of the Month vs. Sergio Pettis
- Bleacher Report
  - 2014 #8 Ranked Fight of the Year vs. Sergio Pettis at UFC on Fox: Henderson vs. Thomson

== Mixed martial arts record ==
Professional record breakdown
37 matches	21 wins	15 losses
By knockout	4	1
By submission	7	7
By decision	10	7
No contests	1	

Res.	Record	Opponent	Method	Event	Date	Round	Time	Location	Notes
Loss	21–15 (1)	Sean Woodson	Decision (unanimous)	UFC on ESPN: Lewis vs. Nascimento	May 11, 2024	3	5:00	St. Louis, Missouri, United States	
Loss	21–14 (1)	Giga Chikadze	Decision (unanimous)	UFC Fight Night: Holloway vs. The Korean Zombie	August 26, 2023	3	5:00	Kallang, Singapore	
Win	21–13 (1)	Daniel Pineda	Decision (unanimous)	UFC on ESPN: Kara-France vs. Albazi	June 3, 2023	3	5:00	Las Vegas, Nevada, United States	Fight of the Night.
Win	20–13 (1)	Julian Erosa	TKO (head kick and punches)	UFC Fight Night: Cannonier vs. Strickland	December 17, 2022	1	3:04	Las Vegas, Nevada, United States	Performance of the Night.
Loss	19–13 (1)	Sodiq Yusuff	Decision (unanimous)	UFC Fight Night: Santos vs. Ankalaev	March 12, 2022	3	5:00	Las Vegas, Nevada, United States	
Win	19–12 (1)	Choi Seung-woo	Submission (rear-naked choke)	UFC Fight Night: Costa vs. Vettori	October 23, 2021	2	3:31	Las Vegas, Nevada, United States	Choi was deducted 1 point in round 1 for an illegal knee. Performance of the Night.
Win	18–12 (1)	Kevin Croom	Decision (unanimous)	UFC Fight Night: Rozenstruik vs. Gane	February 27, 2021	3	5:00	Las Vegas, Nevada, United States	
Win	17–12 (1)	Austin Springer	Submission (rear-naked choke)	UFC Fight Night: Smith vs. Rakić	August 29, 2020	1	3:38	Las Vegas, Nevada, United States	Catchweight (151 lb) bout; Springer missed weight.
Win	16–12 (1)	Chase Hooper	Decision (unanimous)	UFC 250	June 6, 2020	3	5:00	Las Vegas, Nevada, United States	
Win	15–12 (1)	Steven Peterson	Decision (unanimous)	UFC on ESPN: dos Anjos vs. Edwards	July 20, 2019	3	5:00	San Antonio, Texas, United States	
Loss	14–12 (1)	Kron Gracie	Submission (rear-naked choke)	UFC on ESPN: Ngannou vs. Velasquez	February 17, 2019	1	2:06	Phoenix, Arizona, United States	
Win	14–11 (1)	Martin Bravo	Decision (split)	The Ultimate Fighter: Undefeated Finale	July 6, 2018	3	5:00	Las Vegas, Nevada, United States	Fight of the Night.
Loss	13–11 (1)	Wang Guan	Decision (split)	UFC Fight Night: Bisping vs. Gastelum	November 25, 2017	3	5:00	Shanghai, China	
Win	13–10 (1)	Rolando Dy	TKO (doctor stoppage)	UFC Fight Night: Holm vs. Correia	June 17, 2017	2	5:00	Kallang, Singapore	
Loss	12–10 (1)	Jason Knight	Submission (rear-naked choke)	UFC on Fox: Shevchenko vs. Peña	January 28, 2017	2	4:21	Denver, Colorado, United States	
Loss	12–9 (1)	Yair Rodríguez	Decision (split)	UFC Fight Night: Rodríguez vs. Caceres	August 6, 2016	5	5:00	Salt Lake City, Utah, United States	Fight of the Night.
Win	12–8 (1)	Cole Miller	Decision (unanimous)	UFC 199	June 4, 2016	3	5:00	Inglewood, California, United States	
Win	11–8 (1)	Masio Fullen	Decision (unanimous)	UFC on Fox: Johnson vs. Bader	January 30, 2016	3	5:00	Newark, New Jersey, United States	Return to Featherweight.
Loss	10–8 (1)	Francisco Rivera	KO (punches)	UFC Fight Night: Boetsch vs. Henderson	June 6, 2015	1	0:21	New Orleans, Louisiana, United States	
Loss	10–7 (1)	Masanori Kanehara	Decision (unanimous)	UFC Fight Night: Hunt vs. Nelson	September 20, 2014	3	5:00	Saitama, Japan	
Loss	10–6 (1)	Urijah Faber	Submission (rear-naked choke)	UFC 175	July 5, 2014	3	1:09	Las Vegas, Nevada, United States	
Win	10–5 (1)	Sergio Pettis	Submission (rear-naked choke)	UFC on Fox: Henderson vs. Thomson	January 25, 2014	3	4:39	Chicago, Illinois, United States	Submission of the Night. Fight of the Night.
Win	9–5 (1)	Roland Delorme	Decision (split)	UFC 165	September 21, 2013	3	5:00	Toronto, Ontario, Canada	
NC	8–5 (1)	Kang Kyung-ho	NC (overturned)	UFC on Fuel TV: Silva vs. Stann	March 3, 2013	3	5:00	Saitama, Japan	Originally a split decision win for Caceres; overturned after he tested positive for marijuana.
Win	8–5	Motonobu Tezuka	Decision (split)	UFC on Fuel TV: Franklin vs. Le	November 10, 2012	3	5:00	Macau, SAR, China	
Win	7–5	Damacio Page	Submission (triangle choke)	UFC on Fuel TV: Munoz vs. Weidman	July 11, 2012	2	1:27	San Jose, California, United States	Submission of the Night.
Loss	6–5	Edwin Figueroa	Decision (split)	UFC 143	February 4, 2012	3	5:00	Las Vegas, Nevada, United States	Caceres was deducted two points for multiple kicks to the groin.
Win	6–4	Cole Escovedo	Decision (unanimous)	UFC on Fox: Velasquez vs. dos Santos	November 12, 2011	3	5:00	Anaheim, California, United States	Bantamweight debut.
Loss	5–4	Jimy Hettes	Submission (rear-naked choke)	UFC Live: Hardy vs. Lytle	August 14, 2011	2	3:12	Milwaukee, Wisconsin, United States	
Loss	5–3	Mackens Semerzier	Submission (rear-naked choke)	UFC Fight Night: Nogueira vs. Davis	March 26, 2011	1	3:18	Seattle, Washington, United States	Featherweight debut.
Win	5–2	Ketema Jahmal McLennan	TKO (punches)	G-Force Fights: Bad Blood 3	February 4, 2010	3	2:48	Miami, Florida, United States	
Loss	4–2	Matt McCook	Submission (armbar)	WFC: Battle of the Bay 8	July 10, 2009	2	3:56	Tampa, Florida, United States	
Loss	4–1	Farkhad Sharipov	Submission (armbar)	Best of the Best	June 12, 2009	3	3:01	Columbus, Georgia, United States	
Win	4–0	Joel Garcia	Submission (triangle choke)	XFN: Da Matta vs. Thorne	May 14, 2009	1	1:05	Fort Lauderdale, Florida, United States	
Win	3–0	Eric Kovarik	Submission (rear-naked choke)	KOTC: Hurricane	February 21, 2009	1	1:58	Fort Lauderdale, Florida, United States	
Win	2–0	Tulio Quintanilla	TKO (punches)	MFA: There Will Be Blood	December 3, 2008	2	4:14	Miami, Florida, United States	
Win	1–0	Eric Luke	Submission (armbar)	G-Force Fights: Bad Blood 1	November 6, 2008	2	1:45	Miami, Florida, United States	

Exhibition record breakdown		
3 matches	2 wins	1 loss
By submission	2	0
By decision	0	1

Res.	Record	Opponent	Method	Event	Date	Round	Time	Location	Notes
Loss	2–1	Michael Johnson	Decision (unanimous)	The Ultimate Fighter: Team GSP vs. Team Koscheck	November 17, 2010 (airdate)	2	5:00	Las Vegas, Nevada, United States	The Ultimate Fighter 12 Quarter-finals.
Win	2–0	Jeff Lentz	Submission (triangle choke)	The Ultimate Fighter: Team GSP vs. Team Koscheck	September 22, 2010 (airdate)	2	2:27	Las Vegas, Nevada, United States	The Ultimate Fighter 12 Preliminary bout.
Win	1–0	Paul Barrow	Submission (rear-naked choke)	The Ultimate Fighter: Team GSP vs. Team Koscheck	September 15, 2010 (airdate)	1	3:55	Las Vegas, Nevada, United States	The Ultimate Fighter 12 house entry bout.

== Submission grappling record ==
3 Matches, 1 wins 2 Loss 1 draw
Result	Rec.	Opponent	Method	Event	Date	Location
Loss	1–2–1	(England) Nathaniel Wood	Submission (rear-naked choke)	Polaris 27	23 March 2024	Newport, Wales
Loss	1–1–1	(United States) Pat Sabatini	Submission (rear-naked choke)	Fury Pro Grappling 6	30 December 2022	Philadelphia, Pennsylvania, United States
draw	1–0–1	(United States) Clay Guida	Draw	Fury Pro Grappling 5	August 27, 2022	Philadelphia, Pennsylvania, United States
Win	1–0	(United States) Eddy Torres	Submission (rear-naked choke)	Fury Pro Grappling 3	December 30, 2021	Philadelphia, Pennsylvania, United States

== Dirty Boxing Record ==
Professional record breakdown
2 matches	1 win	1 loss
By knockout	1	0
By decision	0	1

Res	Record	Opponent	Method	Event	Date	Round	Time	Location	Notes
Win	1-1	Shawn West	TKO (Body Shot to Ground and Pound)	Dirty Boxing Championship 3	29 August 2025	2	2:59	The Hangar at Regatta Harbour, Miami, Florida, USA	
Loss	0-1	Saidyokub Kakhramonov	Decision (Unanimous)	Dirty Boxing Championship 2	14 June 2025	3	3:00	The Hangar at Regatta Harbour, Miami, Florida, USA	Dirty Boxing Debut

== See also ==
- List of male mixed martial artists
