= The Ultimate Fighter: Latin America 3 =

UFC mixed martial arts television series and event in 2016

- Genre: Reality, Sports
- Created by: Frank Fertitta III, Lorenzo Fertitta, Dana White
- Starring: Dana White, Forrest Griffin, and Chuck Liddell

Production
- Running time: 60 minutes

Original release
- Network: Televisa, UFC Fight Pass
- Release: August 20, 2016

Related
- The Ultimate Fighter: Latin America 2

The Ultimate Fighter: Latin America 3 is an installment of the Ultimate Fighting Championship (UFC)-produced reality television series The Ultimate Fighter.

On May 31, 2016, the UFC announced that the 16 competitors for the season would be made up of lightweight fighters from various locations around Latin America.

The cast consisted of fighters from 9 countries: Bedoya, from Colombia, Castillo, from Nicaragua, Cárdenas and Villaseca, from Chile, Chalo, from Venezuela, Flores, from Bolivia, Puelles, from Peru, Ganin and Rojo, from Argentina, Zamora, from Costa Rica and Bravo, Martínez, Quintanar, Rodríguez, Sabori and Villegas, from Mexico.

The coaches for the season are former UFC Light Heavyweight champions Forrest Griffin and Chuck Liddell. Both retired fighters have been coaches on previous The Ultimate Fighter installments.

Filming for the season began on May 16 in Buenos Aires, Argentina.

== Cast ==
=== Teams ===
Team Griffin:

- Forrest Griffin, Head Coach

Team Liddell:

- Chuck Liddell, Head Coach

=== Fighters ===
- Team Griffin
  - (Mexico) Martín Bravo
  - (Mexico) Pablo Sabori
  - (Mexico) Miguel Villegas
  - (Argentina) Marcelo Rojo
  - (Mexico) Alejandro Martínez
  - (Nicaragua) Yasser Castillo
  - (Costa Rica) Walter Zamora
  - (Bolivia) José David Flores
- Team Liddell
  - (Peru) Claudio Puelles
  - (Venezuela) Ilianovich Chalo
  - (Mexico) Leonardo Rodríguez
  - (Argentina) Javier Ganin
  - (Colombia) John Bedoya
  - (Chile) Santiago Cárdenas
  - (Mexico) Fabian Quintanar
  - (Chile) Juan Villaseca

== Episodes ==
Episode 1:

- Pablo Sabori defeated Santiago Cardenas via submission (armbar) in round 1.

Episode 2:

- Claudio Puelles defeated Jose David Flores via TKO (punches) in round 1.
- Walter Zamora defeated John Bedoya via majority decision after 2 rounds.

Episode 3:

- Ilianovich Chalo defeated Miguel Villegas via KO (punch) in round 1.
- Marcelo Rojo defeated Juan Villaseca via submission (rear naked choke) in round 1.

Episode 4:

- Leonardo Rodriguez defeated Yasser Castillo via majority decision after 2 rounds.
- Martín Bravo defeated Javier Ganin via TKO (knee injury) in round 1.

Episode 5:

- Alejandro Martinez defeated Fabian Quintanar via split decision after 3 rounds.
- John Bedoya replaces Alejandro Martinez due to him being unable to continue as he was suffering with injuries from his fight with Quintanar.

Episode 6:

- Claudio Puelles defeated Pablo Sabori via submission (kneebar) in round 1.
- Leonardo Rodriguez defeated Walter Zamora via unanimous decision after 2 rounds.

Episode 7:

- Martín Bravo defeated Ilianovich Chalo via unanimous decision after 2 rounds.

Episode 8:

- Marcelo Rojo defeated John Bedoya via majority decision after 2 rounds.

Episode 9:

- Martín Bravo defeated Leonardo Rodriguez via unanimous decision after 3 rounds.

Episode 10:

- Claudio Puelles defeated Marcelo Rojo via unanimous decision after 3 rounds.

== Season Bracket ==
Elimination Round
John Bedoya	2
Walter Zamora	MD
Leonardo Rodríguez	MD
Yasser Castillo	2
Javier Ganin	1
Martín Bravo	TKO
Ilianovich Chalo	KO
Miguel Villegas	1
Santiago Cárdenas	1
Pablo Sabori	SUB
Claudio Puelles	TKO
José David Flores	1
Juan Villaseca	1
Marcelo Rojo	SUB
Fabian Quintanar	3
Alejandro Martínez	SD

Quarter-finals
Walter Zamora	2
Leonardo Rodríguez	UD
Martín Bravo	UD
Ilianovich Chalo	2
Pablo Sabori	1
Claudio Puelles	SUB
Marcelo Rojo	UD
John Bedoya*	2

Semi-finals
Leonardo Rodríguez	3
Martín Bravo	UD
Claudio Puelles	UD
Marcelo Rojo	3

Final
Martín Bravo	TKO
Claudio Puelles	2

* Martínez was unable to fight due to injury. Bedoya was chosen to take his spot in the quarterfinals.

Legend
	Team Liddell
	Team Griffin
UD	Unanimous Decision
MD	Majority Decision
SD	Split Decision
SUB	Submission
(T)KO	(Technical) Knock Out

== The Ultimate Fighter Latin America 3 Finale: dos Anjos vs. Ferguson ==
The Ultimate Fighter Latin America 3 Finale: dos Anjos vs. Ferguson
- The poster for The Ultimate Fighter Latin America 3 Finale: dos Anjos vs. Ferguson
- Promotion: Ultimate Fighting Championship
- Date: November 5, 2016
- Venue: Arena Ciudad de México
- City: Mexico City, Mexico
- Attendance: 11,460

Event chronology
UFC Fight Night: Lamas vs. Penn	The Ultimate Fighter Latin America 3 Finale: dos Anjos vs. Ferguson	UFC 205: Alvarez vs. McGregor

The Ultimate Fighter Latin America 3 Finale: dos Anjos vs. Ferguson (also known as UFC Fight Night 98) was a mixed martial arts event held on November 5, 2016, at Arena Ciudad de México in Mexico City, Mexico

=== Background ===
A potential lightweight title eliminator bout between former UFC Lightweight Champion Rafael dos Anjos and The Ultimate Fighter: Team Lesnar vs. Team dos Santos winner Tony Ferguson headlined the event.

The lightweight finale of The Ultimate Fighter: Latin America 3 was contested at the event.

The Ultimate Fighter: Team Jones vs. Team Sonnen middleweight winner Kelvin Gastelum was expected to face Jorge Masvidal in a welterweight bout at the event. However, on September 14, Gastelum was removed in favor of a replacement bout against former lightweight title challenger Donald Cerrone at UFC 205, one week later. Subsequently, Masvidal was removed from the card entirely rescheduled to face Jake Ellenberger the following month at The Ultimate Fighter: Tournament of Champions Finale.

As a result of the cancellation of UFC Fight Night: Lamas vs. Penn, a bout between Sam Alvey and Alex Nicholson was rescheduled for this event.

Guido Cannetti was expected to face Marco Beltrán in a rematch at the event. The pairing first met at one of The Ultimate Fighter: Latin America's tournament bouts where Beltrán won a controversial decision. However, on October 29, Cannetti was pulled from the bout after USADA revealed a potential anti-doping violation from a sample taken October 15. He was replaced by former Bellator Featherweight Champion and one time UFC Bantamweight Championship challenger Joe Soto and the bout was contested at a catchweight of 140 lb.

At the event's weigh-ins, Charles Oliveira failed to make the featherweight limit for his fight with Ricardo Lamas, coming in nine pounds over the 146 lb weight allowance. He was fined 30 percent of his earnings, and Lamas and promotion officials insisted that Oliveira not weigh more than 160 lb the day of the fight or the fight would be cancelled. Felipe Arantes also missed weight for his bout against Erik Pérez, coming in two pounds over the bantamweight weight allowance. He was fined 20 percent of his purse.

=== Results ===
Main Card (Fox Sports 1)
Weight class				Method	Round	Time	Notes
Lightweight	Tony Ferguson	def.	Rafael dos Anjos	Decision (unanimous) (48–47, 48–47, 48–47)	5	5:00
Lightweight	Diego Sanchez	def.	Marcin Held	Decision (unanimous) (29–28, 29–28, 29–27)	3	5:00
Lightweight	Ricardo Lamas	def.	Charles Oliveira	Submission (guillotine choke)	2	2:13
Lightweight	Martín Bravo	def.	Claudio Puelles	TKO (punches)	2	1:55	(Note: The Ultimate Fighter: Latin America 3 tournament final)
Lightweight	Beneil Dariush	def.	Rashid Magomedov	Decision (unanimous) (30–27, 30–27, 29–28)	3	5:00
Women's Strawweight	Alexa Grasso	def.	Heather Jo Clark	Decision (unanimous) (30–27, 30–27, 29–28)	3	5:00
Preliminary Card (Fox Sports 1)
Catchweight (138 lb)	Erik Pérez	def.	Felipe Arantes	Decision (split) (28–29, 29–28, 29–28)	3	5:00
Catchweight (140 lb)	Joe Soto	def.	Marco Beltrán	Submission (heel hook)	1	1:37
Welterweight	Max Griffin	def.	Erick Montaño	TKO (punches)	1	0:54
Bantamweight	Douglas Silva de Andrade	def.	Henry Briones	TKO (elbow and spinning back fist)	3	2:33
Preliminary Card (UFC Fight Pass)
Middleweight	Sam Alvey	def.	Alex Nicholson	Decision (unanimous) (29–28, 29–28, 29–28)	3	5:00
Lightweight	Polo Reyes	def.	Jason Novelli	Decision (split) (29–28, 28–29, 29–28)	3	5:00
Featherweight	Enrique Barzola	def.	Chris Avila	Decision (unanimous) (30–26, 30–26, 30–26)	3	5:00

=== Bonus awards ===
The following fighters were awarded $50,000 bonuses:

- Fight of the Night: Tony Ferguson vs. Rafael dos Anjos
- Performance of the Night: Ricardo Lamas and Douglas Silva de Andrade

=== Aftermath ===
On August 21, 2017, it was announced that Cannetti was given a 10-month suspension by USADA, retroactive to October 28, 2016. The provisional suspension came after testing positive for ostarine, hydrochlorothiazide and chlorothiazide. USADA conducted tests on the supplements Cannetti was taking at the time of the sample collection, and concluded that the supplements were tainted.

== See also ==
- The Ultimate Fighter
- List of UFC events
- 2016 in UFC
