= UFC Fight Night: Rodríguez vs. Stephens =

UFC mixed martial arts event in 2019

- The poster for UFC Fight Night: Rodríguez vs. Stephens
- Promotion: Ultimate Fighting Championship
- Date: September 21, 2019
- Venue: Mexico City Arena
- City: Mexico City, Mexico
- Attendance: 10,112

Event chronology
UFC Fight Night: Cowboy vs. Gaethje	UFC Fight Night: Rodríguez vs. Stephens	UFC Fight Night: Hermansson vs. Cannonier

UFC Fight Night: Rodríguez vs. Stephens (also known as UFC Fight Night 159 or UFC on ESPN+ 17) was a mixed martial arts event produced by the Ultimate Fighting Championship that took place on September 21, 2019, at Mexico City Arena in Mexico City, Mexico.

== Background ==
While not officially announced by the organization, the promotion was initially targeting a featherweight bout between former title challengers Brian Ortega and Chan Sung Jung to serve as the event headliner. However, promotion officials elected to go in another direction and a featherweight bout between The Ultimate Fighter: Latin America featherweight winner Yair Rodríguez and Jeremy Stephens served as the main event.

A women's strawweight bout between Istela Nunes and former Invicta FC Strawweight Champion Angela Hill was scheduled for the event. However, on August 12, it was reported that Nunes was removed from the card due to a failed drug test. She was replaced by Ariane Carnelossi.

Alex Perez was scheduled to face Sergio Pettis at the event. However, Perez pulled out of the bout on August 26 citing an injury. He was replaced by promotional newcomer Tyson Nam.

Marion Reneau was scheduled to face Irene Aldana at the event. However, Reneau pulled out of the bout on September 11 for undisclosed reasons. She was replaced by promotional newcomer Vanessa Melo. At the weigh-ins, Melo weighed in at 140 pounds, 4 pounds over the bantamweight non-title fight limit of 136. She was fined 30% of her purse and her bout with Aldana proceeded at a catchweight.

== Results ==
Main Card (ESPN+)
Weight class				Method	Round	Time	Notes
Featherweight	Yair Rodríguez	vs.	Jeremy Stephens	No Contest (accidental eye poke)	1	0:15	(Note: An accidental eye poke rendered Stephens unable to continue.)
Women's Strawweight	Carla Esparza	def.	Alexa Grasso	Decision (majority) (28–28, 29–28, 29–28)	3	5:00
Flyweight	Askar Askarov	vs.	Brandon Moreno	Draw (split) (28–28, 29–28, 27–30)	3	5:00
Catchweight (140 lb)	Irene Aldana	def.	Vanessa Melo	Decision (unanimous) (30–26, 30–26, 30–26)	3	5:00
Featherweight	Steven Peterson	def.	Martin Bravo	KO (spinning backfist)	2	1:31
Preliminary Card (ESPN+)
Bantamweight	José Alberto Quiñónez	def.	Carlos Huachin	Decision (unanimous) (30–27, 30–27, 30–27)	3	5:00
Featherweight	Kyle Nelson	def.	Polo Reyes	TKO (punches)	1	1:36
Women's Strawweight	Angela Hill	def.	Ariane Carnelossi	TKO (doctor stoppage)	3	1:56
Flyweight	Sergio Pettis	def.	Tyson Nam	Decision (unanimous) (30–27, 30–27, 30–27)	3	5:00
Light Heavyweight	Paul Craig	def.	Vinicius Moreira	Submission (rear-naked choke)	1	3:19
Women's Bantamweight	Bethe Correia	def.	Sijara Eubanks	Decision (unanimous) (29–28, 29–28, 29–28)	3	5:00
Lightweight	Claudio Puelles	def.	Marcos Rosa Mariano	Decision (unanimous) (30–25, 30–25, 30–25)	3	5:00

== Bonus awards ==
The following fighters received $50,000 bonuses.

- Fight of the Night: Carla Esparza vs. Alexa Grasso
- Performance of the Night: Steven Peterson and Paul Craig

== See also ==
- 2019 in UFC
- List of current UFC fighters
