= Mike Santiago =

Mike Santiago may refer to:

- Mike Santiago (American football)
- Mike Santiago (fighter)
