= Michel Prazeres =

Brazilian mixed martial arts fighter

- Born: July 25, 1981 (age 45); Belém, Pará, Brazil
- Other names: Tractor
- Height: 5 ft 6 in (1.68 m)
- Weight: 170 lb (77 kg; 12 st)
- Division: Lightweight; Welterweight
- Reach: 69 1/2 in (177 cm)
- Fighting out of: Belém, Pará, Brazil
- Team: Frankiko Team / Trator Team
- Rank: 2nd degree black belt in Brazilian Jiu-Jitsu under Ricardo de la Riva
- Years active: 2000–present

Mixed martial arts record
- Total: 34
- Wins: 27
- By knockout: 1
- By submission: 11
- By decision: 15
- Losses: 7
- By submission: 1
- By decision: 6

Other information
- Mixed martial arts record from Sherdog
- Last updated on: December 19, 2013

Michel Prazeres (born July 25, 1981) is a Brazilian mixed martial artist who fights in the Welterweight division. He most notably fought for the Ultimate Fighting Championship (UFC). Prazeres notably holds two of the four known North-South Choke finishes in the UFC.

== Mixed martial arts career ==
=== Early MMA career ===
Prazeres began training MMA at age 12 when he watched his inspiration, Bruce Lee. His MMA career began in 2000, when he won his debut fight by submission. He went on to win his first six fights straight via stoppage. Prazeres built up an undefeated record of 16–0 competing in local and regional promotions across his native Brazil before signing with the UFC in early 2013.

=== Ultimate Fighting Championship ===
Upon signing with the UFC, Prazeres made his promotional debut as a short notice injury replacement on May 18, 2013, against Paulo Thiago at UFC on FX: Belfort vs. Rockhold. Prazeres lost the fight by unanimous decision, giving him his first career loss.

Prazeres next fought Jesse Ronson on September 21, 2013, at UFC 165. He won the fight by a close split decision. It was his first fight outside of his native Brazil.

Prazeres faced Mairbek Taisumov on March 23, 2014, at UFC Fight Night 38, replacing the injured Gleison Tibau. He won the fight by dominant unanimous decision. Taisumov had multiple point deductions and the fight ended up being scored (30-25, 30-25, 30-25) in favor of Prazeres.

Prazeres faced Kevin Lee on February 14, 2015, at UFC Fight Night 60. He lost the fight by unanimous decision.

Prazeres faced Valmir Lázaro on November 21, 2015, at The Ultimate Fighter Latin America 2 Finale. He won the fight by split decision.

Prazeres was expected to face Anthony Rocco Martin on July 23, 2016, at UFC on Fox 20. However, Martin pulled out of the fight in early July citing a neck injury and was replaced by promotional newcomer J.C. Cottrell. He won the fight via unanimous decision.

Prazeres next faced Gilbert Burns on September 24, 2016, at UFC Fight Night 95. He won the fight via unanimous decision.

Prazeres faced Josh Burkman on March 11, 2017, at UFC Fight Night 106. He won the fight via submission in the first round. The win also earned Prazeres his first Performance of the Night bonus award.

Prazeres was expected to face Islam Makhachev on September 2, 2017, at UFC Fight Night 115. However, Makhachev pulled out of the fight in mid-August citing injury and was replaced by promotional newcomer Mads Burnell. At the weigh ins, Prazeres missed the lightweight limit of 156 pounds, coming in at 159 pounds. As a result his bout with Mads Burnell was changed to a catchweight and Prazeres was fined 20% of his purse. Prazeres won the fight by submission in the third round.

Prazeres faced Desmond Green on February 3, 2018, at UFC Fight Night 125. At the weigh-ins Prazeres weighed in at 161 pounds, 5 pounds over the lightweight non title fight upper limit of 156 pounds. As a result, the bout proceeded at a catchweight and Prazeres was fined 20 percent of his purse to Green. He won the fight via unanimous decision.

Prazeres faced Zak Cummings on May 19, 2018, at UFC Fight Night 129. He won the back-and-forth fight via split decision.

Prazeres faced Bartosz Fabiński on November 17, 2018, at UFC Fight Night 140. He won the fight via guillotine choke submission in the first round.

Prazeres was scheduled to face Ramazan Emeev at UFC Fight Night 145. However, on February 4, 2019, it was reported that Emeev pulled out of the fight, citing injury. He was replaced by newcomer Ismail Naurdiev. Prazeres lost the fight by unanimous decision.

On February 11, 2020, news surfaced that Prazeres tested positive for anabolic agents in two out-of-competition samples on March 9, 2019. Prazeres was handed a two-year ban, making him eligible to return to competition on March 9, 2021.

Prazeres faced Shavkat Rakhmonov on June 26, 2021, at UFC Fight Night 190. He lost the fight via a rear-naked choke in round two.

On December 14, 2021, it was announced that Prazeres had asked for his release from the UFC.

On December 23, 2021, it was announced that Prazeres had accepted a 4 year USADA ban after four different urine samples all tested positive for the banned substances clomiphene and its metabolites (desethyl-clomiphene, clomiphene M1, and clomiphene M2), oxandrolone metabolites, and the exogenous administration of testosterone and/or its precursors in four different out-of-competition tests between Aug. 27 and Nov. 2. Prazeres will be eligible to compete again on Aug. 27, 2025, four years from the date of the initial positive sample. After receiving the suspension, Prazeres briefly decided to retire from MMA, but changed his mind after discovering that USADA can’t stop him from competing in several countries, including Brazil. Prazeres blamed the positive tests on fertility treatment due to his wife having trouble conceiving.

=== Post UFC ===
In his first appearance post UFC, Prazeres faced Stefan Negucić for SBC Welterweight Championship on September 9, 2022, at Serbian Battle Championship 44. He won the bout via unanimous decision.

=== Absolute Championship Akhmat ===
Prazeres faced Abubakar Vagaev on September 2, 2023 at ACA 162 as part of the 2023 ACA Welterweight Grand Prix, losing the bout via unanimous decision.

Prazeres faced Renat Lyatifov on May 17, 2024 at ACA 175: Gordeev vs. Damkovskiy, losing the bout via unanimous decision.

== Personal life ==
Prazeres has a son.

Before his bout against Desmond Green at UFC Fight Night: Machida vs. Anders, Prazeres's brother Edson Amaral dos Prazeres was killed in an accident in Belém less than two weeks before the fight and week before that, his wife Cassia Andrade dos Prazeres had to undergo surgery a second time for curettage after suffering a miscarriage on Jan. 1st.

== Championships and accomplishments ==
- Ultimate Fighting Championship
  - Performance of the Night (One time) vs. Josh Burkman
- Serbian Battle Championship
  - SBC Welterweight Championship (One time)

== Mixed martial arts record ==
Professional record breakdown
34 matches	27 wins	7 losses
By knockout	1	0
By submission	11	1
By decision	15	6

Res.	Record	Opponent	Method	Event	Date	Round	Time	Location	Notes
Loss	27–7	Evgeniy Galochkin	Decision (unanimous)	ACA 186	May 10, 2025	3	5:00	Saint Petersburg, Russia	
Loss	27–6	Renat Lyatifov	Decision (unanimous)	ACA 175	May 17, 2024	3	5:00	Moscow, Russia	
Loss	27–5	Abubakar Vagaev	Decision (unanimous)	ACA 162	September 2, 2023	5	5:00	Krasnodar, Russia	2023 ACA Welterweight Grand Prix Quarterfinal.
Win	27–4	Stefan Negucić	Decision (unanimous)	Serbian Battle Championship 44	September 9, 2022	3	5:00	Belgrade, Serbia	Won the SBC Welterweight Championship.
Loss	26–4	Shavkat Rakhmonov	Submission (rear-naked choke)	UFC Fight Night: Gane vs. Volkov	June 26, 2021	2	2:10	Las Vegas, Nevada, United States	
Loss	26–3	Ismail Naurdiev	Decision (unanimous)	UFC Fight Night: Błachowicz vs. Santos	February 23, 2019	3	5:00	Prague, Czech Republic	
Win	26–2	Bartosz Fabiński	Submission (guillotine choke)	UFC Fight Night: Magny vs. Ponzinibbio	November 17, 2018	1	1:02	Buenos Aires, Argentina	
Win	25–2	Zak Cummings	Decision (split)	UFC Fight Night: Maia vs. Usman	May 19, 2018	3	5:00	Santiago, Chile	Return to Welterweight.
Win	24–2	Desmond Green	Decision (unanimous)	UFC Fight Night: Machida vs. Anders	February 3, 2018	3	5:00	Belém, Brazil	Catchweight (161 lb) bout; Prazeres missed weight.
Win	23–2	Mads Burnell	Submission (north-south choke)	UFC Fight Night: Volkov vs. Struve	September 2, 2017	3	1:26	Rotterdam, Netherlands	Catchweight (159 lb) bout; Prazeres missed weight.
Win	22–2	Josh Burkman	Submission (north-south choke)	UFC Fight Night: Belfort vs. Gastelum	March 11, 2017	1	1:42	Fortaleza, Brazil	Performance of the Night.
Win	21–2	Gilbert Burns	Decision (unanimous)	UFC Fight Night: Cyborg vs. Länsberg	September 24, 2016	3	5:00	Brasília, Brazil	Catchweight (158 lb) bout; Prazeres missed weight.
Win	20–2	J.C. Cottrell	Decision (unanimous)	UFC on Fox: Holm vs. Shevchenko	July 23, 2016	3	5:00	Chicago, Illinois, United States	
Win	19–2	Valmir Lázaro	Decision (split)	The Ultimate Fighter Latin America 2 Finale: Magny vs. Gastelum	November 21, 2015	3	5:00	Monterrey, Mexico	
Loss	18–2	Kevin Lee	Decision (unanimous)	UFC Fight Night: Henderson vs. Thatch	February 14, 2015	3	5:00	Broomfield, Colorado, United States	
Win	18–1	Mairbek Taisumov	Decision (unanimous)	UFC Fight Night: Shogun vs. Henderson 2	March 23, 2014	3	5:00	Natal, Brazil	Taisumov was docked 2 points: one for an illegal head kick in round 1 and another for grabbing the cage in round 2.
Win	17–1	Jesse Ronson	Decision (split)	UFC 165	September 21, 2013	3	5:00	Toronto, Ontario, Canada	Lightweight debut.
Loss	16–1	Paulo Thiago	Decision (unanimous)	UFC on FX: Belfort vs. Rockhold	May 18, 2013	3	5:00	Jaraguá do Sul, Brazil	
Win	16–0	Leandro Batata	Decision (unanimous)	Shooto Brazil 30	June 2, 2012	3	5:00	Belém, Brazil	
Win	15–0	Sérgio Leal	Submission (rear-naked choke)	Jungle Fight 37	March 31, 2012	1	1:49	São Paulo, Brazil	
Win	14–0	André Luis Lobato	Decision (unanimous)	Iron Man Championship 6	June 10, 2010	3	5:00	Belém, Brazil	
Win	13–0	Antônio Carlos Ribeiro	Submission (triangle choke)	Midway Fight	June 26, 2008	1	N/A	Belém, Brazil	
Win	12–0	Frederick Samurai	Decision (unanimous)	Mega Champion Fight 2	November 10, 2007	3	5:00	Manaus, Brazil	
Win	11–0	Valter de Menezes	Decision (unanimous)	Predador FC 5	April 21, 2007	3	5:00	São Paulo, Brazil	
Win	10–0	Gabriel Santos	Decision (unanimous)	Macapa Verdadeiro Vale Tudo	March 22, 2007	3	5:00	Macapá, Brazil	
Win	9–0	Anderson Banana	Submission (rear-naked choke)	Predador FC 4	January 25, 2007	1	N/A	São Paulo, Brazil	
Win	8–0	Edilson Florêncio	Decision (unanimous)	Midway Fight	October 5, 2006	3	5:00	Belém, Brazil	
Win	7–0	Ari dos Santos	Decision (unanimous)	Ilha Combat	July 1, 2006	3	5:00	Macapá, Brazil	
Win	6–0	Luis Neto	Submission (punches)	Iron Man Vale Tudo 7	June 11, 2005	1	4:16	Macapá, Brazil	
Win	5–0	Elias Monteiro	TKO (punches)	Super Vale Tudo Ananindeua	April 14, 2004	1	1:17	Ananindeua, Brazil	
Win	4–0	Cleber Santana	Submission (choke)	Super Vale Tudo Ananindeua	September 12, 2003	2	2:22	Ananindeua, Brazil	
Win	3–0	Rogério Gama	Submission (rear-naked choke)	Desafio de Gigantes	March 21, 2003	1	3:47	Macapá, Brazil	
Win	2–0	Sérgio de Oliveira	Submission (rear-naked choke)	Desafio de Gigantes	March 21, 2003	1	2:13	Macapá, Brazil	
Win	1–0	Sandro Lyon	Submission (rear-naked choke)	Open Fight Vale Tudo 2	October 9, 2000	1	3:58	Belém, Brazil	

== See also ==
- List of male mixed martial artists
