= Desmond Green =

American mixed martial artist

- Born: October 11, 1989 (age 37); Rochester, New York, United States
- Other names: The Predator
- Height: 5 ft 10 in (178 cm)
- Weight: 155 lb (70 kg; 11.1 st)
- Division: Featherweight; Lightweight; Welterweight
- Reach: 73 in (185 cm)
- Style: Wrestling, Boxing
- Stance: Southpaw
- Fighting out of: Lantana, Florida, United States
- Team: Tristar (formerly); Combat Club
- Wrestling: NCAA Division I Wrestling
- Years active: 2011–present

Mixed martial arts record
- Total: 33
- Wins: 25
- By knockout: 7
- By submission: 1
- By decision: 17
- Losses: 8
- By submission: 2
- By decision: 6

Other information
- University: University at Buffalo
- Notable school: Rush–Henrietta High School
- Mixed martial arts record from Sherdog

Desmond Green (born October 11, 1989) is an American mixed martial artist who competed in the lightweight division for Ultimate Fighting Championship. Green is a bare-knuckle boxer for BYB Extreme Fighting Series, where he is the current BYB Middleweight Champion and Police Gazette Diamond Belt champion.

== Background ==
Green wrestled at Rush–Henrietta High School, where he won a state championship. He later wrestled at University at Buffalo, where he worked towards a major degree in social sciences. He was removed from the wrestling team after he tested positive for marijuana. Green was a Mid-American Conference Champion and three-time Division 1 NCAA Qualifier.

Green also worked part-time at Walmart as a cashier before signing a contract with Bellator MMA.

Green has three children: two daughters named Tsajelia, Dahlia and a son named Desmond Jr.

== Mixed martial arts career ==
=== Early career ===
Green started his professional career in 2012. He fought mainly for northeastern American promotions. In the first year of his career, he amassed a record of 8 wins and 1 loss.

Early in 2013, shortly after winning the New England Fights lightweight title with his TKO victory over UFC veteran Henry Martinez, Green signed with Bellator MMA to fight in the featherweight tournament.

=== Bellator MMA ===
Green made his promotional debut against Fabrício Guerreiro on September 13, 2013, at Bellator 99 in the quarterfinal match of Bellator season nine featherweight tournament. He lost via unanimous decision.

Green faced Angelo Sanchez on October 25, 2013, at Bellator 105. He won via TKO at 1:04 of round two after the doctor stated Sanchez was unable to continue.

Green faced Mike Richman on February 28, 2014, at Bellator 110 in the quarterfinal match of Bellator season ten featherweight tournament. He won the fight via unanimous decision. In the semifinals, he faced Will Martinez at Bellator 114 on March 28, 2014. Green again won the fight via unanimous decision. Green faced Daniel Weichel in the tournament final at Bellator 119. He lost the fight via submission in the second round.

Green was released from the promotion, along with several others, on August 26, 2014.

=== Titan Fighting Championship ===
In early September 2014, it was announced that Green had signed a contract with Titan Fighting Championship. He made his debut on October 31, 2014, in the main event at Titan FC 31 against Miguel Torres. Green won the fight via knockout in the first round.

Green next faced UFC veteran Steven Siler on December 19, 2014, at Titan FC 32 for the vacant Titan FC Featherweight Championship.

For his first title defense Green faced UFC and Strikeforce veteran Kurt Holobaugh on March 20, 2015, at Titan FC 33. He was once again forced to cut his dreadlocks to make weight. After a back and forth fight, Green lost the fight via split decision.

=== Ultimate Fighting Championship ===
In February 2017, it was announced that Green had signed with the UFC.

Green made his promotional debut against Josh Emmett on April 8, 2017, at UFC 210. He won the fight by split decision.

Green faced Rustam Khabilov on September 2, 2017, at UFC Fight Night 115. He lost the fight via unanimous decision. After the bout with Khabilov, Desmond signed a new contract with the UFC.

Green faced Michel Prazeres on February 3, 2018, at UFC Fight Night 125. At the weigh-ins Prazeres weighed in at 161 pounds, 5 pounds over the lightweight non-title fight upper limit of 156 pounds. As a result, the bout proceeded at a catchweight and Prazeres was fined 20 percent of his purse, which went to Green. He lost the fight via unanimous decision.

Green faced Gleison Tibau on June 1, 2018, at UFC Fight Night 131. He won the fight by unanimous decision.

Green faced Mairbek Taisumov on September 15, 2018, at UFC Fight Night 136. At weigh-ins, Taisumov weighted five pounds over lightweight non-title fight limit of 161 and he was fined 40 percent of his purse, which went to Green. Green lost the close fight via unanimous decision.

Green faced Ross Pearson on March 30, 2019, at UFC on ESPN 2. He won the fight via technical knockout in round one.

Green faced newcomer Charles Jourdain on May 18, 2019, at UFC Fight Night: dos Anjos vs. Lee. He won the fight by unanimous decision.

In January 2020, it was reported that Green was released by the UFC.

=== Post-UFC career ===
Green made his post-UFC debut against Piankhi Zimmerman on March 19, 2022, at Gamebred Fighting Championship: Freedom Fight Night. He won the bout via first round TKO.

== Bare-knuckle boxing ==
=== BYB Extreme ===
Green made his bare knuckle boxing debut with BYB on September 11, 2021 against Jeff Chiffens.

On November 19, 2022 at BYB 13 in Tampa, he defeated three-time BKB champion Scott McHugh to capture the inaugural BYB Middleweight title and the Police Gazette Diamond Belt.

== Championships and accomplishments ==
=== Amateur wrestling ===
- National Collegiate Athletic Association
  - Mid-American Conference 149 lb: Champion out of University at Buffalo (2009–10)
  - Mid-American Conference 149 lb: Runner–up out of University at Buffalo (2008)
- New York State College Wrestling
  - New York State Intercollegiate Championships 149 lb: Runner–up out of University of Buffalo (2008)
- University at Buffalo Athletics
  - UB Open 149 lb: Champion out of University at Buffalo (2009)
  - UB Open 157 lb: 6th place out of University at Buffalo (2008)
- Cornell University Athletics
  - Body Bar Invitational 149 lb: 3rd place out of University at Buffalo (2008)
- New York State Public High School Athletic Association
  - New York State Championship 140 lb: Champion out of Rush–Henrietta High School (2007)
- Empire State Games
  - Empire State Championship 143 lb: Champion out of Rush–Henrietta High School (2007)

=== Mixed martial arts ===
- Bellator MMA
  - Bellator Season 10 Featherweight Tournament Runner-Up
- New England Fights
  - NEF Lightweight Championship (One time)
- Titan Fighting Championships
  - Titan FC Featherweight Championship (One time, first)

=== Bare-knuckle boxing ===
- BYB Extreme Fighting Series
  - BYB Middleweight Champion (One time, current)
  - Police Gazette Diamond Belt (One time, current)

== Personal life ==
=== Vehicle collision and legal problems ===
On August 18, 2018, Green was involved in a car accident in Florida when he lost control of his SUV and veered toward a tractor-trailer, resulting in a five-car crash which killed two people. Green suffered only minor injuries in the accident. Green was involved in a minor accident two weeks prior to this five-car crash accident where he was cited driving with a suspended license and no proof of insurance with a toxicology report that Green tested positive for Cannabinoid, Tetrahydrocannabinol and a blood-alcohol level of 0.14 . Subsequently, on June 26, 2019, it was reported that Green was arrested and jailed for 20 separate charges, including two second-degree felony counts of DUI manslaughter; four third-degree felony counts of DUI causing serious bodily injury; third-degree felony possession of cocaine; five misdemeanor counts of DUI property damage; and third-degree felony driving with a suspended license with jail on bonds totaling $194,000.

During his pre-trial release, Green was charged with felony driving without license on January 22, 2020. Subsequently, his release was revoked and Green was jailed, pending his court hearing on March 6, 2020.

== Bare-knuckle boxing record ==
Professional record breakdown
3 matches	3 wins	0 losses
By knockout	2	0
By decision	1	0

Res.	Record	Opponent	Method	Event	Date	Round	Time	Location	Notes
Win	3–0	Scott McHugh	TKO	BYB 13: Tampa Brawl For It All	November 19, 2022	3	1:45	Tampa, Florida, United States	Won the BYB Middleweight Championship and Police Gazette Diamond Championship.
Win	2–0	Carlos Alexandra Da Costa	Decision (unanimous)	BYB 8: Tis the Season to Brawl	December 18, 2021	5	3:00	Miami, Florida, United States	
Win	1–0	Jeff Chiffens	TKO	BYB 7: Brawl by the River	September 11, 2021	1	2:49	Miami, Florida, United States	

== Mixed martial arts record ==
Professional record breakdown
33 matches	25 wins	8 losses
By knockout	7	0
By submission	1	2
By decision	17	6

Res.	Record	Opponent	Method	Event	Date	Round	Time	Location	Notes
Win	25–8	Piankhi Zimmerman	Decision (unanimous)	Cagezilla FC 66	April 23, 2022	3	5:00	Manassas, Virginia, United States	
Win	24–8	Piankhi Zimmerman	TKO (punches)	Gamebred Fighting Championship: Freedom Fight Night	March 19, 2022	1	3:26	Miami, Florida, United States	
Win	23–8	Charles Jourdain	Decision (unanimous)	UFC Fight Night: dos Anjos vs. Lee	May 18, 2019	3	5:00	Rochester, New York, United States	
Win	22–8	Ross Pearson	TKO (punches)	UFC on ESPN: Barboza vs. Gaethje	March 30, 2019	1	2:52	Philadelphia, Pennsylvania, United States	
Loss	21–8	Mairbek Taisumov	Decision (unanimous)	UFC Fight Night: Hunt vs. Oleinik	September 15, 2018	3	5:00	Moscow, Russia	Catchweight (161 lbs) bout; Taisumov missed weight.
Win	21–7	Gleison Tibau	Decision (unanimous)	UFC Fight Night: Rivera vs. Moraes	June 1, 2018	3	5:00	Utica, New York, United States	
Loss	20–7	Michel Prazeres	Decision (unanimous)	UFC Fight Night: Machida vs. Anders	February 3, 2018	3	5:00	Belém, Brazil	Catchweight (161 lbs) bout; Prazeres missed weight.
Loss	20–6	Rustam Khabilov	Decision (unanimous)	UFC Fight Night: Volkov vs. Struve	September 2, 2017	3	5:00	Rotterdam, Netherlands	
Win	20–5	Josh Emmett	Decision (split)	UFC 210	April 8, 2017	3	5:00	Buffalo, New York, United States	
Win	19–5	Martin Brown	Decision (split)	Titan FC 42	December 2, 2016	3	5:00	Coral Gables, Florida, United States	Return to Lightweight.
Win	18–5	James Freeman	Decision (unanimous)	Titan FC 40	August 5, 2016	3	5:00	Coral Gables, Florida, United States	Welterweight debut.
Win	17–5	Desmond Hill	Decision (unanimous)	FFC 24	June 3, 2016	3	5:00	Daytona Beach, Florida, United States	Catchweight (165 lbs) bout.
Win	16–5	David Cubas	TKO (doctor stoppage)	World Fighting Championship Akhmat	March 12, 2016	1	3:48	Grozny, Russia	Return to Lightweight.
Loss	15–5	Andre Harrison	Decision (unanimous)	Titan FC 35	September 19, 2015	5	5:00	Ridgefield, Washington, United States	For the Titan FC Featherweight Championship.
Win	15–4	Vince Eazelle	KO (punch)	Titan FC 34	July 18, 2015	1	0:32	Kansas City, Missouri, United States	Catchweight (150 lbs) bout.
Loss	14–4	Kurt Holobaugh	Decision (split)	Titan FC 33	March 20, 2015	5	5:00	Mobile, Alabama, United States	Lost the Titan FC Featherweight Championship.
Win	14–3	Steven Siler	Decision (unanimous)	Titan FC 32	December 19, 2014	5	5:00	Lowell, Massachusetts, United States	Won the vacant Titan FC Featherweight Championship.
Win	13–3	Miguel Torres	KO (knee and punches)	Titan FC 31	October 31, 2014	1	0:46	Tampa, Florida, United States	
Loss	12–3	Daniel Weichel	Submission (rear-naked choke)	Bellator 119	May 9, 2014	2	2:07	Rama, Ontario, Canada	Bellator Season 10 Featherweight Tournament Final
Win	12–2	Will Martinez	Decision (unanimous)	Bellator 114	March 28, 2014	3	5:00	West Valley City, Utah, United States	Bellator Season 10 Featherweight Tournament Semifinal
Win	11–2	Mike Richman	Decision (unanimous)	Bellator 110	February 28, 2014	3	5:00	Uncasville, Connecticut, United States	Bellator Season 10 Featherweight Tournament Quarterfinal
Win	10–2	Angelo Sanchez	TKO (doctor stoppage)	Bellator 105	October 25, 2013	2	1:04	Rio Rancho, New Mexico, United States	
Loss	9–2	Fabrício Guerreiro	Decision (unanimous)	Bellator 99	September 13, 2013	3	5:00	Temecula, California, United States	Bellator Season 9 Featherweight Tournament Quarterfinal.
Win	9–1	Henry Martinez	TKO (punches)	NEF: Fight Night 7	May 18, 2013	2	1:50	Lewiston, Maine, United States	Won the vacant NEF Lightweight Championship.
Win	8–1	John Ortolani	Decision (unanimous)	CFX 22 – Winter Blast	February 23, 2013	3	5:00	Plymouth, Massachusetts, United States	
Win	7–1	Gemiyale Adkins	Decision (unanimous)	PA Cage Fight 15	February 15, 2013	3	5:00	Wilkes-Barre, Pennsylvania, United States	
Loss	6–1	Rory McDonell	Submission (gogoplata straight armbar)	Score Fighting Series 7	November 23, 2012	1	4:41	Hamilton, Ontario, Canada	Return to Lightweight.
Win	6–0	Brandon Fleming	Decision (unanimous)	NEF: Fight Night 5	November 17, 2012	3	5:00	Lewiston, Maine, United States	Catchweight (150 lbs) bout.
Win	5–0	Matt DiMarcantonio	Decision (unanimous)	Gladius Fights: Fyvie vs. Carlo-Clauss	September 22, 2012	3	5:00	Irving, New York, United States	Featherweight debut.
Win	4–0	Bruce Boyington	Submission (arm-triangle choke)	NEF: Fight Night 4	September 8, 2012	2	N/A	Lewiston, Maine, United States	
Win	3–0	Ryan Peterson	Decision (split)	CFFC 16: Williams vs. Jacoby	August 24, 2012	3	5:00	Atlantic City, New Jersey, United States	
Win	2–0	Phillip LeGrand	Decision (unanimous)	JB Sports / Live Nation: Rock Out Knock Out	June 2, 2012	3	5:00	Asbury Park, New Jersey, United States	
Win	1–0	Rob Font	Decision (unanimous)	Premier FC 8	April 1, 2012	3	5:00	Holyoke, Massachusetts, United States	

=== Mixed martial arts amateur record ===
Res.	Record	Opponent	Method	Event	Date	Round	Time	Location	Notes
Win	2–0	Nate Charles	TKO (punches)	NEF: Fight Night 1	February 11, 2012	2	2:47	Lewiston, Maine, United States	
Win	1–0	Allen Weeks	Submission (rear-naked choke)	Raging Wolf 12	December 17, 2011	1	1:29	Irving, New York, United States	
