= Felipe Silva (fighter) =

Brazilian kickboxer and mixed martial arts fighter

- Born: 5 August 1984 (age 42); Juiz de Fora, Minas Gerais, Brazil
- Height: 6 ft 0 in (1.83 m)
- Weight: 155 lb (70 kg; 11.1 st)
- Division: Lightweight
- Reach: 77 in (196 cm)
- Style: Muay Thai
- Fighting out of: Juiz de Fora, Minas Gerais, Brazil
- Team: CM System (2009–present)
- Rank: Muay Thai Prajied Black since 2006- Black Belt in BJJ- Black Belt In Luta Livre
- Years active: 2013–present

Mixed martial arts record
- Total: 15
- Wins: 10
- By knockout: 8
- By submission: 1
- By decision: 1
- Losses: 5
- By knockout: 4
- By submission: 1

Other information
- Mixed martial arts record from Sherdog

Felipe Silva (born 5 August 1984) is a Brazilian Muay Thai and Kickboxing champion and a mixed martial artist who fights under Brave CF in the lightweight division. A professional mixed martial artist since 2013, Silva has also competed in the Ultimate Fighting Championship (UFC).

== Background ==
Silva began in the combat sport of Muay Thai and he won the Brazilian Muay Thai Championship twice and Brazilian Kickboxing title three-time before transitioning to mixed martial arts.

== Mixed martial arts career ==
=== Early career ===
Silva made his professional mixed martial arts debut in March 2013. He amassed a record of 7–0, competing for various regional promotions in Brazil before signed by UFC.

=== Ultimate Fighting Championship ===
Silva made his official debut for the promotion on 27 August 2016 at UFC on Fox: Maia vs. Condit where he faced Shane Campbell. He won the fight via technical knockout in round one.

He next faced Mairbek Taisumov in September 2017 at UFC Fight Night: Struve vs. Volkov. He lost the fight via knockout in round one.

On 19 May 2018, Silva faced Claudio Puelles at UFC Fight Night: Maia vs. Usman. He lost the fight via a submission in round three.

=== Post-UFC career ===
After being released from the UFC, Silva signed a contract with Brave CF in May 2019. Silva was expected to make his promotional debut by headlining Brave CF 26 against Guram Kutateladze on 7 September 2019. However, Kutateladze withdrew from the bout due to an injury and was replaced by Dumar Roa. Silva won the fight via technical knockout in the first round.

Silva eventually faced Kutateladze in the rescheduled bout at Brave CF 29 on 15 November 2019, losing the back-and-forth fight in the first round via technical knockout.

In his third bout in the Brave CF, Silva faced Sam Patterson at Brave CF 41 on 17 September 2020. He lost fight via first-round knockout.

Silva faced Maciek Gierszewski on 1 April 2021 at Brave CF 50. At weigh-ins, Silva came in 3.1 pounds (1.4 kg) over the catchweight (161 lb) limit and was fined a percentage of his purse which will go to his opponent. He lost by KO in the first round.

== Mixed martial arts record ==
Professional record breakdown
14 matches	9 wins	5 losses
By knockout	7	4
By submission	1	1
By decision	1	0

Res.	Record	Opponent	Method	Event	Date	Round	Time	Location	Notes
Loss	9–5	Maciek Gierszewski	KO (punches)	Brave CF 50	1 April 2021	1	2:28	Arad, Bahrain	Catchweight (161 lb) bout.
Loss	9–4	Sam Patterson	KO (punch)	Brave CF 41	17 September 2020	1	2:12	Riffa, Bahrain	
Loss	9–3	Guram Kutateladze	TKO (punches)	Brave CF 29	15 November 2019	1	0:44	Isa Town, Bahrain	
Win	9–2	Dumar Roa	TKO (punches)	Brave CF 26	7 September 2019	1	N/A	Bogotá, Colombia	
Loss	8–2	Claudio Puelles	Submission (kneebar)	UFC Fight Night: Maia vs. Usman	19 May 2018	3	2:23	Santiago, Chile	
Loss	8–1	Mairbek Taisumov	KO (punch)	UFC Fight Night: Volkov vs. Struve	2 September 2017	1	1:24	Rotterdam, Netherlands	
Win	8–0	Shane Campbell	TKO (punches)	UFC on Fox 21	27 August 2016	1	1:13	Vancouver, Canada	
Win	7–0	Anton Kuivanen	TKO (punches)	Cage 35	13 May 2016	1	4:04	Helsinki, Finland	
Win	6–0	Carlos Irigoitia	Submission (armbar)	Explosion MMA 5	2 October 2015	1	0:48	Asunción, Paraguay	
Win	5–0	Allan Moziel	Decision (unanimous)	JF Fight Evolution 14	4 October 2014	3	5:00	Juiz de Fora, Brazil	
Win	4–0	Kleverson Bracin	TKO	Face the Danger 7	23 August 2014	1	N/A	Telêmaco Borba, Brazil	
Win	3–0	Johny Vieira	TKO (punches)	JF Fight Evolution 13	5 October 2013	1	3:58	Juiz de Fora, Brazil	
Win	2–0	Anildo Dias Jr.	KO (knee and punches)	Iron Fight Combat 4	7 September 2013	1	4:21	São José dos Pinhais, Brazil	
Win	1–0	Alexandre Baptista da Costa	TKO (punches)	Nitrix Champion Fight 14	9 March 2013	1	4:21	Balneário Camboriú, Brazil	

== See also ==
- List of current Brave CF fighters
- List of male mixed martial artists
