= UFC Fight Night: Hunt vs. Oleinik =

UFC mixed martial arts event in 2018

- The poster for UFC Fight Night: Hunt vs. Oleinik
- Promotion: Ultimate Fighting Championship
- Date: September 15, 2018
- Venue: Olimpiyskiy Stadium
- City: Moscow, Russia
- Attendance: 22,603
- Total gate: $1,840,000

Event chronology
UFC 228: Woodley vs. Till	UFC Fight Night: Hunt vs. Oleinik	UFC Fight Night: Santos vs. Anders

UFC Fight Night: Hunt vs. Oleinik (also known as UFC Fight Night 136) was a mixed martial arts event produced by the Ultimate Fighting Championship held on September 15, 2018 at Olimpiyskiy Stadium in Moscow, Russia.

== Background ==
The event marked the promotion's first visit to Russia, the 21st country. The UFC arranged to use half of the venue and used a modified seating configuration for the arena.

While not officially announced, the promotion was initially targeting a heavyweight bout between former UFC Heavyweight Champion Fabrício Werdum and Aleksei Oleinik to serve as the main event. However, on May 22, Werdum was flagged for a potential USADA doping violation and his status moving forward became unknown. On July 19, the promotion announced that a bout between the 2001 K-1 World Grand Prix winner and former interim title challenger Mark Hunt and Oleinik would serve as the event headliner. On September 11, USADA announced that Werdum was suspended for two years due to steroid trenbolone and its metabolite epitrenbolone.

Rustam Khabilov was expected to face Kajan Johnson at UFC Fight Night: Werdum vs. Volkov. However, Khabilov pulled out of the fight citing an injury and the bout was scrapped. The pairing was rescheduled for this event.

Douglas Silva de Andrade was briefly scheduled to face Petr Yan at the event. However, Andrade pulled out of the fight on August 9 citing a foot injury. He was replaced by promotional newcomer Jin Soo Son.

Krzysztof Jotko was expected to face promotional newcomer Adam Yandiev at the event. However, Jotko pulled out of the fight on August 16 citing injury and was replaced by Jordan Johnson.

Cláudio Silva was scheduled to face Ramazan Emeev at the event. However, Silva pulled out of the fight in early September citing a lower back injury. Emeev instead faced promotional newcomer Stefan Sekulić.

Omari Akhmedov was expected to face C. B. Dollaway at the event. However, Akhmedov pulled out of the fight in early September and was briefly replaced by promotional newcomer Artem Frolov. However, after just three days, Frolov backed out of the fight citing lingering injuries. He was replaced by promotional newcomer Khalid Murtazaliev.

At the weigh-ins, Jin Soo Son and Mairbek Taisumov both missed the required weight for their respective fights. Son weighed in at 137 pounds, 1 pound over the bantamweight non-title fight limit of 136. Meanwhile, Taisumov weighed in at 161 pounds, 5 pounds over the lightweight non-title fight limit of 156. Son was fined 20 percent of his purse, which went to his opponent Petr Yan, while Taisumov surrendered 40 percent of his purse to Desmond Green.

== Results ==
Main Card (UFC Fight Pass)
Weight class				Method	Round	Time	Notes
Heavyweight	Aleksei Oleinik	def.	Mark Hunt	Submission (rear-naked choke)	1	4:26
Light Heavyweight	Jan Błachowicz	def.	Nikita Krylov	Submission (arm-triangle choke)	2	2:41
Heavyweight	Shamil Abdurakhimov	def.	Andrei Arlovski	Decision (unanimous) (29–28, 30–27, 30–27)	3	5:00
Welterweight	Alexey Kunchenko	def.	Thiago Alves	Decision (unanimous) (30–27, 29–28, 29–28)	3	5:00
Preliminary Card (UFC Fight Pass)
Middleweight	Khalid Murtazaliev	def.	C. B. Dollaway	TKO (referee stoppage)	2	5:00
Catchweight (137 lb)	Petr Yan	def.	Jin Soo Son	Decision (unanimous) (30–27, 30–27, 29–28)	3	5:00
Lightweight	Rustam Khabilov	def.	Kajan Johnson	Decision (split) (29–28, 28–29, 29–28)	3	5:00
Catchweight (161 lb)	Mairbek Taisumov	def.	Desmond Green	Decision (unanimous) (30–27, 30–27, 30–27)	3	5:00
Light Heavyweight	Magomed Ankalaev	def.	Marcin Prachnio	KO (head kick and punches)	1	3:09
Middleweight	Jordan Johnson	def.	Adam Yandiev	Submission (arm-triangle choke)	2	0:42
Welterweight	Ramazan Emeev	def.	Stefan Sekulić	Decision (unanimous) (29–28, 30–27, 30–26)	3	5:00
Bantamweight	Merab Dvalishvili	def.	Terrion Ware	Decision (unanimous) (30–25, 30–25, 30–25)	3	5:00

== Bonus awards ==
The following fighters received $50,000 bonuses:

- Fight of the Night: Petr Yan (Jin Soo Son was unable to receive bonus money due to missing weight)
- Performance of the Night: Aleksei Oleinik, Jan Błachowicz, and Magomed Ankalaev

== See also ==
- List of UFC events
- 2018 in UFC
- List of current UFC fighters
