= Nick Hein =

German mixed martial artist and actor

- Born: April 24, 1984 (age 42); Elsdorf, West Germany
- Other names: Sergeant
- Height: 5 ft 6 in (1.68 m)
- Weight: 155 lb (70 kg; 11.1 st)
- Division: Welterweight; Lightweight; Featherweight
- Reach: 67 in (170 cm)
- Style: Judo, Boxing, BJJ
- Stance: Southpaw
- Fighting out of: Cologne, Germany
- Team: Tiger Muay Thai; Dynamix MMA
- Rank: Black belt in Judo under Karl-Heinz Bartsch; Brown belt in Brazilian Jiu-Jitsu under Björn "Gazelle" Schmiedeberg
- Years active: 2009–2019

Mixed martial arts record
- Total: 20
- Wins: 14
- By knockout: 1
- By submission: 4
- By decision: 9
- Losses: 5
- By knockout: 2
- By submission: 1
- By decision: 2
- No contests: 1

Other information
- Mixed martial arts record from Sherdog

Nick Hein (born April 24, 1984) is a German retired mixed martial artist and former police officer. Hein is the author of the book titled "Polizei am Limit".

== Background ==
Hein was born in Elsdorf and became interested in martial arts after watching a Bruce Lee movie. Instead of joining a Kung Fu class he signed up for Judo, when he was six years old, because there were no Kung Fu clubs in Elsdorf. He started boxing training in 2000 after he watched a UFC event on VHS. He attended his first MMA class in 2009 and fought his first amateur MMA competition in the same year while he was still in the Judo National team for Germany where skipped his training in Berlin for the Judo World Championship. After a failed bid for 2008 Olympics and a leg injury, Hein decided to transition to MMA.

== Judo career ==
Medal record

European U23 Championships
| Gold medal – first place | 2006 Moscow | –81 kg |

European Junior Championships
| Silver medal – second place | 2003 Sarajevo | –81 kg |

European Cadet Championships
| Bronze medal – third place | 2000 Oradea | –66 kg |

Hein started training judo when he was six years old and he was a judoka for 20 years, and in the German team for a decade. He was the U-23 European Judo champion in 2006 and German national champion in 2006 and 2007. He has won more than 35 national and international judo medals.

== Mixed martial arts career ==
=== Amateur career ===
Two years before turning professional in 2009, Hein debuted as an amateur on February 24, 2007, as he faced Ulf Fritzmann at MMA Berlin: Tournament 3. After three rounds of action, the bout was ruled a draw.

=== Ultimate Fighting Championship ===
With a 10-1 (1) record, Hein signed a contract with the UFC on March 31, 2014.

Hein made his promotional debut against Drew Dober on May 31, 2014, at UFC Fight Night: Munoz vs. Mousasi. He won the fight via unanimous decision.

Hein faced James Vick on November 22, 2014, at UFC Fight Night 57. Despite dropping Vick twice in the first round with punches, Hein lost the fight via unanimous decision.

Hein faced Łukasz Sajewski on June 20, 2015, at UFC Fight Night 69. He won the fight by unanimous decision.

Hein next faced promotional newcomer Yusuke Kasuya on September 27, 2015, at UFC Fight Night 75. He won the fight by unanimous decision.

Hein was scheduled to face Jon Tuck on May 8, 2016, at UFC Fight Night 87. However, just days before the event, Hein pulled out citing injury.

Hein next faced Tae Hyun Bang on September 3, 2016, at UFC Fight Night 93. He won the fight via unanimous decision (29-28, 30–28, 30–27).

Hein was expected to face promotional newcomer Zabit Magomedsharipov in a featherweight bout on September 2, 2017, at UFC Fight Night 115. However, Hein pulled out of the fight due to injury on 21 August from the event and replaced by Mike Santiago.

Hein faced Davi Ramos on May 12, 2018, at UFC 224. He lost the fight via rear-naked choke in the first round.

Hein faced Damir Hadžović on July 22, 2018, at UFC Fight Night 134. He lost the fight via split decision.

Hein was scheduled to face Luigi Vendramini on June 1, 2019, at UFC on ESPN+ 11. However, Vendramini pulled out of the bout in late April citing a knee injury and subsequent surgery. Hein remained on the card against Frank Camacho. He lost the fight via TKO in the second round.

On June 2, 2019, Hein announced his retirement from mixed martial arts.

== Personal life ==
Hein worked as a police officer for more than 11 years in the Federal Police in Cologne, Germany. He is known as 'Judge Dredd' by his colleagues in the police force. He also appeared in the German television show Diese Kaminskis, in which he played as an undertaker.

Hein is married to his Japanese wife, Marie Suzuki, and they have a son. His sister was married to UFC fighter Drew Dober who he fought against at UFC Fight Night: Munoz vs. Mousasi.

Hein is the author of the book titled "Polizei am Limit" - Police at the Limit" where he detailed the lack of resources and training in the Police force in Germany.

In 2016, Hein wrote an article on the 2015 New Year's Eve sexual assaults in Germany, where there were widespread reports of sexual assault across the country, with over 600 being reported in Cologne alone. A majority of the perpetrators were found to be from North Africa, primarily Morocco and Algeria, with half of the suspects arriving in Germany within the year. Hein criticized the political and legal system in Germany, feeling it did not do enough to prevent such crimes. He was invited to appear on CNN, Russia Today (RT) and other TV stations to discuss the events, where he voiced his condemnation of the attacks, but additionally voiced his belief that help should be given to refugees who needed it.

== Championships and accomplishments ==
=== Mixed martial arts ===
- Fair Fighting Championship
  - FFC Light Welterweight (161 lb) Championship (One time)
- FFA Western German Championship
  - FFA Western German Middleweight (185lbs.) Champion (2009)

=== Jiu Jitsu ===
- Choke Wars Welterweight (170lbs.) Champion (2013)
- Western German BJJ Middleweight (181lbs) Champion (2013)
- Tap or Snap Super Welterweight (176lbs.) Champion (2013)
- Tap or Snap Middleweight (187lbs.) Champion (2012)

=== Judo ===
- European Judo Under-23 Half Middleweight (179lbs.) Champion (2006)
- German Judo Under-20 Half Middleweight (179lbs.) Champion (2003)
- European Judo Cadet Lightweight (161lbs.) Champion (2000)
- German Judo Under-15 Extra Lightweight (121lbs.) Champion (1998)

== Mixed martial arts record ==
Professional record breakdown
| 20 matches | 14 wins | 5 losses |
| By knockout | 1 | 2 |
| By submission | 4 | 1 |
| By decision | 9 | 2 |
| No contests | 1 | |

| Res. | Record | Opponent | Method | Event | Date | Round | Time | Location | Notes |
|---|---|---|---|---|---|---|---|---|---|
| Loss | 14–5 (1) | Frank Camacho | TKO (punches) | UFC Fight Night: Gustafsson vs. Smith | June 1, 2019 | 2 | 4:56 | Stockholm, Sweden | |
| Loss | 14–4 (1) | Damir Hadžović | Decision (split) | UFC Fight Night: Shogun vs. Smith | July 22, 2018 | 3 | 5:00 | Hamburg, Germany | |
| Loss | 14–3 (1) | Davi Ramos | Submission (rear-naked choke) | UFC 224 | May 12, 2018 | 1 | 4:15 | Rio de Janeiro, Brazil | |
| Win | 14–2 (1) | Tae Hyun Bang | Decision (unanimous) | UFC Fight Night: Arlovski vs. Barnett | September 3, 2016 | 3 | 5:00 | Hamburg, Germany | |
| Win | 13–2 (1) | Yusuke Kasuya | Decision (unanimous) | UFC Fight Night: Barnett vs. Nelson | September 27, 2015 | 3 | 5:00 | Saitama, Japan | |
| Win | 12–2 (1) | Łukasz Sajewski | Decision (unanimous) | UFC Fight Night: Jędrzejczyk vs. Penne | June 20, 2015 | 3 | 5:00 | Berlin, Germany | |
| Loss | 11–2 (1) | James Vick | Decision (unanimous) | UFC Fight Night: Edgar vs. Swanson | November 22, 2014 | 3 | 5:00 | Austin, Texas, United States | |
| Win | 11–1 (1) | Drew Dober | Decision (unanimous) | UFC Fight Night: Munoz vs. Mousasi | May 31, 2014 | 3 | 5:00 | Berlin, Germany | Lightweight debut. |
| Win | 10–1 (1) | Michael Erdinc | Decision (unanimous) | Fair FC | February 8, 2014 | 3 | 5:00 | Herne, Germany | Won the FFC Light Welterweight (161 lbs) Championship. |
| Win | 9–1 (1) | Musa Jangubaev | TKO (punches) | Respect Fighting Championship 10 | September 28, 2013 | 2 | 3:51 | Wuppertal, Germany | |
| Win | 8–1 (1) | Tamirlan Dadaev | Decision (unanimous) | Defenders FC 2 | July 20, 2013 | 3 | 5:00 | Stuttgart, Germany | |
| Win | 7–1 (1) | Robert Pastuch | Decision (unanimous) | Respect Fighting Championship 9 | April 13, 2013 | 3 | 5:00 | Dormagen, Germany | |
| NC | 6–1 (1) | Jordan Błoch | NC (accidental cut) | Respect Fighting Championship 7 | April 21, 2012 | 1 | 1:12 | Essen, Germany | |
| Win | 6–1 | Patrick Herring | Decision (unanimous) | SFC 8: Tournament 2012 Part I | February 4, 2012 | 3 | 5:00 | Mainz, Germany | |
| Loss | 5–1 | Sebastian Risch | TKO (knees) | Respect Fighting Championship 6 | September 17, 2011 | 2 | 4:05 | Wuppertal, Germany | |
| Win | 5–0 | Kamil Lipski | Decision (unanimous) | Respect Fighting Championship 4 | September 11, 2010 | 3 | 5:00 | Herne, Germany | |
| Win | 4–0 | Kurt Verschueren | Submission (rear-naked choke) | OC: Cage Fight Night 7 | April 17, 2010 | 1 | 1:46 | Koblenz, Germany | |
| Win | 3–0 | Stefan Heber | Submission (americana) | FFA: German Championships 2010 | March 6, 2010 | 2 | 2:35 | Berlin, Germany | |
| Win | 2–0 | Milan Tomes | Submission (rear-naked choke) | Backstreet Fights 2: Rematch | December 12, 2009 | 2 | 1:03 | Cologne, Germany | |
| Win | 1–0 | Stefan Heber | Submission (rear-naked choke) | FFA: West German Championships 2009 | August 8, 2009 | 1 | 3:25 | Viersen, Germany | |

== See also ==
- List of current UFC fighters
- List of male mixed martial artists
