= UFC Fight Night: Stephens vs. Choi =

UFC mixed martial arts event in 2018

- The poster for UFC Fight Night: Stephens vs. Choi
- Promotion: Ultimate Fighting Championship
- Date: January 14, 2018
- Venue: Scottrade Center
- City: St. Louis, Missouri, U.S.
- Attendance: 10,052
- Total gate: $812,995

Event chronology
UFC 219: Cyborg vs. Holm	UFC Fight Night: Stephens vs. Choi	UFC 220: Miocic vs. Ngannou

UFC Fight Night: Stephens vs. Choi (also known as UFC Fight Night 124) was a mixed martial arts event produced by the Ultimate Fighting Championship held on January 14, 2018, at Scottrade Center in St. Louis, Missouri.

== Background ==
The event marked the promotion's first visit to St. Louis. Former Zuffa subsidiary Strikeforce previously contested three events in the city, the most recent in December 2010.

The event was headlined by a featherweight bout between Jeremy Stephens and Choi Doo-ho.

A welterweight bout between Kamaru Usman and Emil Weber Meek was originally scheduled for UFC 219. However, due to an alleged visa issue for Meek which affected his travel schedule, the pairing was delayed and then rescheduled for UFC 220. However, on the next day, it was shifted to this event.

Zak Cummings was expected to face Thiago Alves at the event. However just two days before the bout, Cummings injured himself after falling and the bout was canceled.

At the weigh-ins, Mads Burnell weighed in at 150 pounds, 4 pounds over the featherweight non-title fight upper limit of 146 pounds. As such, the bout proceeded at a catchweight and Burnell forfeited 20% of his purse to his opponent Mike Santiago . Meanwhile, Uriah Hall did not weigh in as he fainted en route to the weigh-ins and his fight against former UFC Light Heavyweight Champion and UFC 12 Heavyweight Tournament winner Vitor Belfort was canceled.

== Results ==
Main Card (Fox Sports 1)
Weight class				Method	Round	Time	Notes
Featherweight	Jeremy Stephens	def.	Choi Doo-ho	TKO (punches and elbows)	2	2:36
Women's Flyweight	Jessica-Rose Clark	def.	Paige VanZant	Decision (unanimous) (30–27, 29–28, 29–28)	3	5:00
Welterweight	Kamaru Usman	def.	Emil Weber Meek	Decision (unanimous) (30–27, 30–27, 30–27)	3	5:00
Featherweight	Darren Elkins	def.	Michael Johnson	Submission (rear-naked choke)	2	2:22
Preliminary Card (Fox Sports 1)
Lightweight	James Krause	def.	Alex White	Decision (unanimous) (29–28, 29–28, 29–28)	3	5:00
Lightweight	Polo Reyes	def.	Matt Frevola	KO (punch)	1	1:00
Women's Bantamweight	Irene Aldana	def.	Talita Bernardo	Decision (unanimous) (30–27, 30–27, 30–27)	3	5:00
Bantamweight	Kang Kyung-ho	def.	Guido Cannetti	Submission (triangle choke)	1	4:53
Preliminary Card (UFC Fight Pass)
Women's Flyweight	Jessica Eye	def.	Kalindra Faria	Decision (split) (29–28, 28–29, 29–28)	3	5:00
Women's Strawweight	JJ Aldrich	def.	Danielle Taylor	Decision (unanimous) (29–28, 29–28, 29–28)	3	5:00
Catchweight (150 lb)	Mads Burnell	def.	Mike Santiago	Decision (unanimous) (29–28, 29–28, 29–28)	3	5:00

== Bonus awards ==
The following fighters were awarded $50,000 bonuses:

- Fight of the Night: Jeremy Stephens vs. Doo Ho Choi
- Performance of the Night: Darren Elkins and Polo Reyes

== See also ==
- List of UFC events
- 2018 in UFC
- List of current UFC fighters
