= Mike Santiago (fighter) =

American mixed martial arts fighter

- Born: Mike Santiago; June 28, 1989 (age 37); Wood Dale, Illinois, United States
- Other names: Little Bully
- Nationality: American
- Height: 5 ft 10 in (1.78 m)
- Weight: 154 lb (70 kg; 11 st 0 lb)
- Division: Featherweight
- Reach: 69.0 in (175 cm)
- Stance: Orthodox
- Fighting out of: Wood Dale, Illinois, United States
- Team: Team Top Notch
- Years active: 2010-present

Mixed martial arts record
- Total: 36
- Wins: 22
- By knockout: 7
- By submission: 11
- By decision: 4
- Losses: 14
- By knockout: 3
- By submission: 9
- By decision: 2

Other information
- Mixed martial arts record from Sherdog

Michael Santiago (born July 28, 1989) is an American mixed martial artist who competed in the Featherweight division of the Ultimate Fighting Championship.

== Mixed martial arts career ==
=== Early career ===
Starting his career in 2010, Mark compiled a 20–10 record fighting for a variety of American regional promotions, most notably winning the Ring of Combat Featherweight championship, which he defended twice, and both the Lightweight and Featherweight championships at Hoosier FC, before he was given a chance to earn a UFC contract at Dana White's Contender Series.

Mike fought Mark Cherico on August 22, 2017 at Dana White's Contender Series 7 . He won the fight via TKO in the first round but did not earn a UFC contract. However a week later, he got a chance as an injury replacement.

=== Ultimate Fighting Championship ===
Santiago made his UFC debut as an injury replacement for Nick Hein against Zabit Magomedsharipov on September 2, 2017 at UFC Fight Night: Struve vs. Volkov. Santiago lost the fight via submission rear-naked choke in the second round.

His second fight came on January 14, 2018 at UFC Fight Night: Stephens vs. Choi against Mads Burnell. He lost the fight via unanimous decision.

Mike faced Dan Ige on June 9, 2018 at UFC 225. He lost the fight via TKO in the first round.

== Championships and accomplishments ==
=== Mixed martial arts ===
- Ring of Combat
  - ROC Featherweight Championship
    - Two successful defences
- Hoosier FC
  - Hoosier FC Featherweight Championship
  - Hoosier FC Lightweight Championship

== Mixed martial arts record ==
Professional record breakdown
37 matches	22 wins	15 losses
By knockout	7	4
By submission	11	7
By decision	4	4

Res.	Record	Opponent	Method	Event	Date	Round	Time	Location	Notes
Loss	22–15	Bruno Machado	Technical Submission (anaconda choke)	UAE Warriors 12	July 31, 2020	2	2:11	Abu Dhabi, United Arab Emirates	For UAEW Lightweight Championship.
Loss	22–14	Timur Nagibin	TKO (corner stoppage)	Russian Cagefighting Championship: RCC Intro 6	November 16, 2019	2	5:00	Ekaterinburg, Russia	
Win	22–13	Alonzo Martinez	Submission (guillotine choke)	Final Fight Championship 37	May 30, 2019	2	3:22	Las Vegas, Nevada, United States	Catchweight (160 lb) bout.
Loss	21–13	Dan Ige	TKO (punches)	UFC 225	June 9, 2018	1	0:50	Chicago, Illinois, United States	
Loss	21–12	Mads Burnell	Decision (unanimous)	UFC Fight Night: Stephens vs. Choi	January 14, 2018	3	5:00	St. Louis, Missouri, United States	
Loss	21–11	Zabit Magomedsharipov	Submission (rear-naked choke)	UFC Fight Night: Volkov vs. Struve	September 2, 2017	2	4:22	Rotterdam, Netherlands	
Win	21–10	Mark Cherico	KO (punches)	Dana White's Contender Series 7	August 22, 2017	1	1:59	Las Vegas, Nevada, United States	
Win	20–10	Nick Wayne	TKO (punches)	Hoosier Fight Club 33	April 15, 2017	1	2:07	Hammond, Indiana, United States	Won Hoosier FC Lightweight Championship.
Win	19–10	Bill Kamery	Submission (armbar)	Hoosier Fight Club 31	November 5, 2016	1	2:34	Hammond, Indiana, United States	Won Hoosier FC Featherweight Championship.
Win	18–10	Luis Saldaña	TKO (punches)	RFA 39	June 17, 2016	3	2:27	Hammond, Indiana, United States	
Win	17–10	Lester Caslow	Submission (guillotine choke)	Ring of Combat 54	March 4, 2016	1	0:39	Atlantic City, New Jersey, United States	Defended ROC Featherweight Championship.
Win	16-10	Jose Pacheco	Submission (arm-triangle choke)	XFO 56: Outdoor War 11	August 15, 2015	3	4:10	New Orleans, Louisiana, United States	
Win	15–10	Mervin Rodriguez	Decision (unanimous)	Ring of Combat 51	June 5, 2015	1	4:27	Bangor, Maine, United States	Defended ROC Featherweight Championship.
Win	14–10	Shelby Graham	Submission (rear-naked choke)	Xtreme Fighting Organization 55	April 25, 2015	1	2:38	Chicago, Illinois, United States	
Win	13–10	Kenny Foster	KO (punches and elbows)	Ring of Combat 50	January 23, 2015	1	1:55	Atlantic City, New Jersey, United States	For Vacant ROC Featherweight Championship. Return to Featherweight.
Win	12–10	Eric Calderon	Decision (unanimous)	American Predator Fighting Championships 17	October 11, 2014	1	1:55	Illinois, United States	
Win	11–10	Gustavo Rodriguez	TKO (punches)	XFO 52: Outdoor War 10	August 9, 2014	2	2:51	Island Lake, Illinois, United States	
Loss	10–10	Frankie Perez	Submission (rear-naked choke)	Ring of Combat 45	January 24, 2014	21	1:56	Louisville, Kentucky, United States	
Loss	10–9	Mike Medrano	Submission (guillotine choke)	CFFC 26: Sullivan vs. Martinez	August 17, 2013	1	0:31	Atlantic City, New Jersey, United States	
Loss	10–8	Phillipe Nover	Decision (Unanimous)	Ring of Combat 45	June 14, 2013	3	5:00	Fairfax, Virginia, United States	For Vacant ROC Lightweight Championship. Lightweight debut.
Win	10–7	Terry House Jr.	Decision (unanimous)	Hoosier Fight Club 15	April 6, 2013	2	2:54	Valparaiso, Indiana, United States	
Win	9–7	Dustin Phillips	Submission (rear-naked choke)	MMA Xtreme Showdown	December 1, 2012	3	5:00	Illinois, United States	Catchweight (150 lb) bout.
Loss	8–7	Deividas Taurosevicius	Submission (guillotine choke)	Ring of Combat 42	September 14, 2012	2	1:57	Atlantic City, New Jersey, United States	For ROC Featherweight Championship.
Win	8–6	Omar Vega	TKO (punches)	Maxx FC: Raise of Legends 2	June 2, 2012	1	2:51	San Juan, Puerto Rico	
Loss	7–6	Taurean Bogguess	Decision (unanimous)	Xtreme Fighting Organization 43	April 13, 2012	3	5:00	Anaheim, California, United States	
Win	7–5	Patrick Murphy	TKO (Punches)	Xtreme Gladiator Challenge: St. Patty's Day Beatdown	Mar 17, 2012	1	2:14	Cheyenne, Wyoming, United States	
Win	6–5	Andrew Osborne	TKO (Punches)	Pure MMA: The Beginning	January 22, 2012	1	3:38	Plains, Pennsylvania, United States	
Loss	5–5	Josh Shockley	Submission (rear-naked choke)	Chicago Cagefighting Championship 4	October 15, 2011	1	1:28	Villa Park, Illinois, United States	Catchweight (160 lb) bout.
Loss	5–4	Brendan Weafer	TKO (punches)	Cage Wars 8: House of Pain	July 29, 2011	1	1:16	Atlantic City, New Jersey, United States	
Win	5–3	Zach Underwood	Decision (unanimous)	NAFC: Mayhem	May 5, 2011	3	5:00	Milwaukee, Wisconsin, United States	
Loss	4–3	Eric Kriegermeier	Submission (rear-naked choke)	Chicago Cagefighting Championship	March 4, 2011	2	3:	Villa Park, Illinois, United States	
Win	4–2	Jeff Green	Submission (rear-naked xhoke)	Hoosier FC 6: New Years Nemesis	January 14, 2011	1	2:37	Valparaiso, Indiana, United States	
Win	3–2	Ramon Barber	TKO (punches)	Ruckus Entertainment 4	November 24, 2010	1	4:01	Addison, Illinois, United States	
Loss	2–1	Donavon Winters	TKO (punches)	XFO 36	August 14, 2010	2	2:12	Island Lake, Illinois, United States	
Win	2–0	Jake Murphy	Decision (split)	Xtreme Fighting Organization 35	June 5, 2010	3	5:00	Island Lake, Illinois, United States	
Win	1–0	Brian van Hoven	Decision (unanimous)	Jake the Snake Promotions: Cage Time 1	April 30, 2010	3	5:00	Atlantic City, New Jersey, United States	Featherweight debut.

== See also ==
- List of male mixed martial artists
