= Damir Hadžović =

Bosnian-Danish mixed martial artist

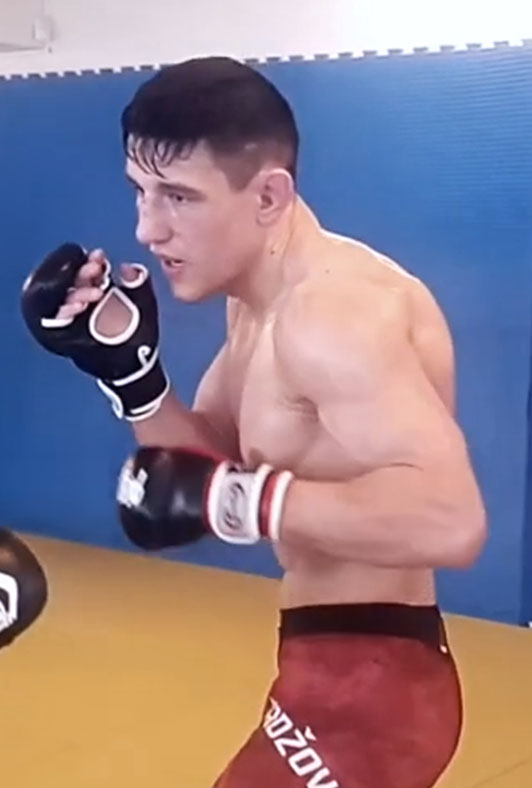
- Born: August 8, 1986 (age 40); Goražde, SR Bosnia and Herzegovina, SFR Yugoslavia
- Other names: The Bosnian Bomber
- Nationality: Danish
- Height: 5 ft 11 in (180 cm)
- Weight: 155 lb (70 kg; 11 st 1 lb)
- Division: Welterweight; Lightweight
- Reach: 70 in (178 cm)
- Fighting out of: Copenhagen, Denmark
- Team: Arte Suave Copenhagen Rumble Sports
- Teacher: Koubti
- Rank: Purple belt in Brazilian Jiu-Jitsu
- Years active: 2009–present

Mixed martial arts record
- Total: 22
- Wins: 14
- By knockout: 7
- By submission: 3
- By decision: 4
- Losses: 8
- By knockout: 2
- By submission: 1
- By decision: 5

Other information
- Occupation: MMA referee Bouncer
- Mixed martial arts record from Sherdog

Damir Hadžović (born August 8, 1986) is a Bosnian-born Danish mixed martial artist who competes in the Lightweight division of the Ultimate Fighting Championship (UFC).

== Background ==
Hadžović was born to Bosniak parents in the eastern Bosnian town of Goražde in the Socialist Federal Republic of Yugoslavia (present-day Bosnia and Herzegovina). In 1992, when he was six years old, his mother and him fled to Macedonia for a year during the Bosnian War (1992-1995). They later moved to Denmark, living in a refugee center and later were granted asylum where his dad joined them in 1996.

Unlike most MMA fighters, Hadžović was a bodybuilder prior to starting MMA. He was hooked to learn more about MMA as to find out the techniques of the sport which led him to his MMA career. Hadžović worked as a bouncer at an Irish pub in Copenhagen and as a part-time MMA referee.

== Mixed martial arts career ==
=== Early career ===
Hadžović fought in the European circuit for six years in some of the organisations such as Cage Warriors and Venator Fighting Championships, and amassed a record 10–2, with six-fight winning streak, prior joining UFC.

=== Ultimate Fighting Championship ===
Hadžović was signed by UFC in early 2016 and he was the third Danish MMA fighter to be part of the UFC roaster after Martin Kampmann and Nicolas Dalby.

Hadžović made his promotion debut on April 10, 2016, at UFC Fight Night: Rothwell vs. dos Santos against Mairbek Taisumov. He lost the fight via knockout in round one.

Hadžović was scheduled to face Yusuke Kasuya on September 10, 2016, at UFC 203. However the fight was postponed after Hadžović could not get the printed travel visa on time to travel to United States. The pairing was rescheduled at UFC Fight Night: Lamas vs. Penn. However, the promotion announced on October 6 that they had cancelled the event entirely.

One year after his first fight in the UFC, Hadžović returned to the cage and faced Marcin Held at UFC Fight Night: Gustafsson vs. Teixeira on May 28, 2017. Hadžović won via KO in round three when Held shot for a takedown and ran into Hadžović's knee. The win also earned Hadžović his first Performance of the Night bonus award.

Hadžović faced Alan Patrick on February 3, 2018, at UFC Fight Night 125. He lost the fight via unanimous decision.

Hadžović faced Nick Hein on July 22, 2018, at UFC Fight Night 134. He won the fight via split decision.

Hadžović faced Polo Reyes on February 23, 2019, at UFC Fight Night 145. He won the fight via knockout in the second round.

Hadžović faced Christos Giagos on June 1, 2019, at UFC Fight Night 153. He lost the fight via unanimous decision.

Hadžović faced Renato Moicano on March 14, 2020, at UFC Fight Night 170. He lost the fight via a submission in round one.

Hadžović was scheduled to face Nikolas Motta on May 8, 2021, at UFC on ESPN 24. However, Motta was pulled from the event, citing foot injury. In turn, Hadžović was rescheduled and was expected to face Yancy Medeiros two weeks later at UFC Fight Night: Font vs. Garbrandt. However, the bout was pulled from the card just hours before taking place due to health issues with Hadžović. The pairing was rescheduled on June 26, 2021, at UFC Fight Night 190. He won the fight via unanimous decision.

Hadžović was scheduled to face Steve Garcia on April 23, 2022, at UFC Fight Night 205. The fight was scrapped due to Hadžović's visa issues.

Hadžović faced Marc Diakiese on July 23, 2022, at UFC Fight Night 208. He lost the fight by unanimous decision.

Hadžović was scheduled to face Bolaji Oki on February 10, 2024, at UFC Fight Night 236. However, Hadžović withdrew due to visa issues and was replaced by Timothy Cuamba.

Hadžović faced Terrance McKinney on February 1, 2025 at UFC Fight Night 250. He lost the fight by technical knockout via ground-and-pound in the first round.

== Championships and accomplishments ==
=== Mixed martial arts ===
- Ultimate Fighting Championship
  - Performance of the Night (One time) vs. Marcin Held
  - UFC.com Awards
    - 2017: Ranked #9 Knockout of the Year vs. Marcin Held

== Personal life ==
His moniker "The Bosnian Bomber" was given to him by his MMA teammate as he did not have the proper striking technique but was "throwing bombs" when he started training MMA.

As Hadžović was born in Bosnia and raised in Denmark. He identifies himself as a Bosnian and a Dane, as he puts it: "I represent both countries, I love both countries, you know, Denmark is my home." "It's Bosnian hardware, Danish software." He is a Muslim.

== Mixed martial arts record ==
Professional record breakdown
22 matches	14 wins	8 losses
By knockout	7	2
By submission	3	1
By decision	4	5

Res.	Record	Opponent	Method	Event	Date	Round	Time	Location	Notes
Loss	14–8	Terrance McKinney	TKO (punches)	UFC Fight Night: Adesanya vs. Imavov	February 1, 2025	1	2:01	Riyadh, Saudi Arabia	
Loss	14–7	Marc Diakiese	Decision (unanimous)	UFC Fight Night: Blaydes vs. Aspinall	July 23, 2022	3	5:00	London, England	
Win	14–6	Yancy Medeiros	Decision (unanimous)	UFC Fight Night: Gane vs. Volkov	June 26, 2021	3	5:00	Las Vegas, Nevada, United States	
Loss	13–6	Renato Moicano	Submission (rear-naked choke)	UFC Fight Night: Lee vs. Oliveira	March 14, 2020	1	0:44	Brasília, Brazil	
Loss	13–5	Christos Giagos	Decision (unanimous)	UFC Fight Night: Gustafsson vs. Smith	June 1, 2019	3	5:00	Stockholm, Sweden	
Win	13–4	Polo Reyes	TKO (punches)	UFC Fight Night: Błachowicz vs. Santos	February 23, 2019	2	2:03	Prague, Czech Republic	
Win	12–4	Nick Hein	Decision (split)	UFC Fight Night: Shogun vs. Smith	July 22, 2018	3	5:00	Hamburg, Germany	
Loss	11–4	Alan Patrick	Decision (unanimous)	UFC Fight Night: Machida vs. Anders	February 3, 2018	3	5:00	Belém, Brazil	
Win	11–3	Marcin Held	KO (knee)	UFC Fight Night: Gustafsson vs. Teixeira	May 28, 2017	3	0:07	Stockholm, Sweden	Performance of the Night.
Loss	10–3	Mairbek Taisumov	KO (punch)	UFC Fight Night: Rothwell vs. dos Santos	April 10, 2016	1	3:44	Zagreb, Croatia	
Win	10–2	Ivan Musardo	TKO (corner stoppage)	Venator FC: Guerrieri Italiani Finals	May 30, 2015	2	5:00	Bologna, Italy	
Win	9–2	Martin Delaney	Decision (unanimous)	Cage Warriors 69	June 7, 2014	3	5:00	London, England	
Win	8–2	John Maguire	KO (knees and punches)	Cage Warriors 66	March 22, 2014	1	3:58	Ballerup, Denmark	
Win	7–2	Thibault Colleuil	Submission (armbar)	European MMA 7	November 7, 2013	1	N/A	Aarhus, Denmark	Catchweight (161 lb) bout.
Win	6–2	Nic Osei	TKO (punches)	WKN Valhalla: Battle of the Vikings	March 9, 2013	2	0:00	Aarhus, Denmark	Lightweight debut.
Win	5–2	Matej Truhan	Decision (majority)	Royal Arena 2	August 31, 2012	3	5:00	Copenhagen, Denmark	
Loss	4–2	Krzysztof Jotko	Decision (unanimous)	MMA Attack 2	April 27, 2012	3	5:00	Katowice, Poland	Welterweight bout.
Loss	4–1	Andreas Ståhl	Decision (unanimous)	Cage Fight Live 2	November 19, 2011	3	5:00	Herning, Denmark	
Win	4–0	Jaroslav Poborský	Submission (rear-naked choke)	Cage Fight Live 1	April 9, 2011	2	3:14	Herning, Denmark	
Win	3–0	Michael Hojermark	TKO (doctor stoppage)	The Zone FC 7	November 27, 2010	3	3:11	Gothenburg, Sweden	
Win	2–0	Tim Waage	Submission (D'Arce choke)	Fighter Gala 15	September 11, 2010	1	4:18	Odense, Denmark	
Win	1–0	Alaan Briefkani	TKO (leg kicks and elbows)	Fighter Gala 11	November 14, 2009	1	3:29	Odense, Denmark	

== See also ==
- List of current UFC fighters
- List of male mixed martial artists
