= Mads Burnell =

Danish mixed martial artist (born 1994)

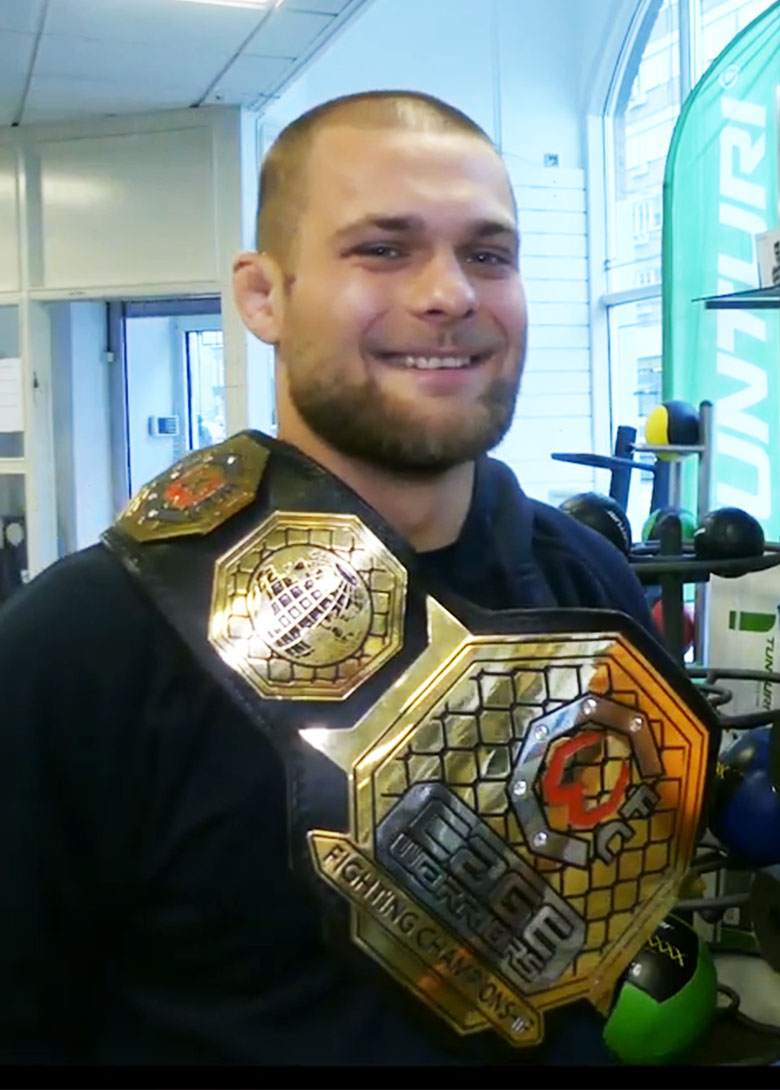
- Mads Burnell
- Born: Mads Zerahn Burnell; March 6, 1994 (age 32); Husum, Denmark
- Height: 5 ft 8 in (1.73 m)
- Weight: 66 kg (146 lb; 10 st 6 lb)
- Division: Featherweight
- Reach: 69 in (175 cm)
- Style: Brazilian jiu-jitsu
- Fighting out of: Copenhagen, Denmark
- Team: Arte Suave Copenhagen; Xtreme Couture
- Trainer: Nikolai Koubti
- Rank: 1st degree black belt in Brazilian Jiu-Jitsu under Chris Haueter
- Years active: 2013–present

Mixed martial arts record
- Total: 29
- Wins: 21
- By knockout: 1
- By submission: 10
- By decision: 10
- Losses: 8
- By knockout: 3
- By submission: 3
- By decision: 2

Other information
- Mixed martial arts record from Sherdog

Mads Burnell (born March 6, 1994) is a Danish mixed martial artist who competes in featherweight division. A Professional mixed martial artist since 2013, Burnell has competed in the Ultimate Fighting Championship (UFC), Bellator MMA, Professional Fighters League (PFL), and Cage Warriors, where he was a Featherweight champion. He was the European Championship (Brazilian jiu-jitsu) European No-Gi Champion in 2014.

== Mixed martial arts career ==
=== Early career ===
Burnell started his professional MMA career in 2013 and won his first five bouts and met his first defeat when he faced Ott Tonissaar at Octagon Athletes 2. He fought all this fights in Northern Europe and amassed a record of 8–1 prior joining UFC.

=== Ultimate Fighting Championship ===
Burnell made his promotional debut on September 2, 2017, facing Michel Prazeres, replacing Islam Makhachev at UFC Fight Night: Volkov vs. Struve." At the weigh ins, Prazeres missed the lightweight limit of 156 pounds, coming in at 159 pounds. As a result, the bout was changed to a catchweight and Prazeres was fined 20% of his purse. He lost the fight via submission due to a north–south choke in the third round.

His second fight came against Mike Santiago on January 14, 2018, at UFC Fight Night: Stephens vs. Choi. He won the fight via unanimous decision.

On May 27, 2018, Burnell faced Arnold Allen at UFC Fight Night: Thompson vs. Till. After dominating most of the fight, he was caught in a front naked choke in the third round and lost the fight.

On September 7, 2018, Burnell was released from UFC.

=== Cage Warriors ===
On September 7, 2018, news surfaced that Burnell had signed a contract with Cage Warriors. Burnell made his promotional debut against Lukasz Rajewski at Cage Warriors 99 on November 17, 2018. After weathering the early storm from Rajewski, Burnell took the fight to the ground and finished the fight via rear-naked choke in the first round.

Burnell challenged Dean Trueman for the Cage Warriors featherweight title at Cage Warriors 106 on June 29, 2019. Burnell submitted Trueman by Japanese necktie in the second round and captured the featherweight championship.

Burnell was expected to make his first title defense against Steve Aimable at Cage Warriors London on November 22, 2019. However, Aimable could not make championship weight and the fight was changed to non-title bout. Burnell won the fight via unanimous decision.

=== Bellator MMA ===
On August 4, 2020, news surfaced that Burnell had signed a contract with Bellator.

Burnell made his debut on October 10, 2020, at Bellator 248. He faced Darko Banovic and won the fight via TKO in the first round.

Burnell was scheduled to face The Ultimate Fighter: Team McGregor vs. Team Faber standout Saul Rogers on April 2, 2021, at Bellator 255. However, the bout was cancelled due to visa issues. It eventually took place on April 16, 2021, at Bellator 257. Burnell won the bout via second round rear-naked choke.

Burnell faced Emmanuel Sanchez at Bellator 263 on July 31, 2021. He won the bout via unanimous decision.

On September 22, 2021, it was announced that Burnell had signed a new, multi-fight contract with Bellator.

Burnell headlined against Ádám Borics on March 12, 2022, at Bellator 276. He lost the bout via unanimous decision.

Burnell faced Pedro Carvalho on September 23, 2022, at Bellator 285. He lost the bout via unanimous decision.

Burnell faced Justin Gonzales on April 22, 2023, at Bellator 295. He won the bout via unanimous decision.

Burnell faced Daniel Weichel on September 23, 2023, at Bellator 299. He won the fight by unanimous decision.

=== Professional Fighters League ===
==== 2024 ====
Moving up to LW, Burnell started the 2024 season with a bout against Michael Dufort on April 12, 2024, at PFL 2. He lost the fight due to a guillotine choke submission.

Burnell faced Clay Collard in the main event of PFL 5 at Jon M. Huntsman Center in Salt Lake City, UT on June 21, 2024. He won the fight via unanimous decision.

Burnell faced Elvin Espinoza on August 16, 2024, at PFL 8. He won the fight by unanimous decision.

==== 2025 ====
On February 26, 2025, the promotion officially revealed that Burnell joined the 2025 PFL Lightweight Tournament.

In the quarterfinal, Burnell faced Jay-Jay Wilson on April 18, 2025, at PFL 3. He lost the fight via technical knockout in round three.

Burnell faced Robert Watley on August 15, 2025, at PFL 9, and lost the bout via technical knockout in the third round.

== Championships and accomplishments ==
=== Mixed martial arts ===
- Cage Warriors Fighting Championship
  - CWFC Featherweight Championship (One time)
- Scottish Organisation of Mixed Martial Arts
  - SOMMA Featherweight Championship (One time)
- MMAJunkie.com
  - 2019 June Submission of the Month vs. Dean Trueman
- Nordic MMA Awards - MMAviking.com
  - 2017 Submission of the Year vs. Fernando Duarte

=== Grappling ===
- European Championship (Brazilian jiu-jitsu)
  - European No-Gi Champion 2014

== Mixed martial arts record ==
Professional record breakdown
30 matches	22 wins	8 losses
By knockout	1	3
By submission	11	3
By decision	10	2

Res.	Record	Opponent	Method	Event	Date	Round	Time	Location	Notes
Win	22–8	Westin Wilson	Submission (north-south choke)	Airtox Dominance FC 8	October 17, 2026	1	3:02	Copenhagen, Denmark	Won the inaugural ADFC Featherweight Championship.
Win	21–8	Araik Margaryan	Submission (rear-naked choke)	Airtox Dominance FC 7	August 29, 2026	2	2:28	Randers, Denmark	Return to Featherweight.
Loss	20–8	Robert Watley	TKO (elbows and punches)	PFL 9 (2025)	August 15, 2025	3	2:43	Charlotte, North Carolina, United States	
Loss	20–7	Jay-Jay Wilson	TKO (elbows and punches)	PFL 3 (2025)	April 18, 2025	3	4:42	Orlando, Florida, United States	2025 PFL Lightweight Tournament Quarterfinal.
Win	20–6	Elvin Espinoza	Decision (unanimous)	PFL 8 (2024)	August 16, 2024	3	5:00	Hollywood, Florida, United States	2024 PFL Lightweight Tournament Alternate bout.
Win	19–6	Clay Collard	Decision (unanimous)	PFL 5 (2024)	June 21, 2024	3	5:00	Salt Lake City, Utah, United States	
Loss	18–6	Michael Dufort	Submission (guillotine choke)	PFL 2 (2024)	April 12, 2024	2	1:03	Las Vegas, Nevada, United States	Return to Lightweight.
Win	18–5	Daniel Weichel	Decision (unanimous)	Bellator 299	September 23, 2023	3	5:00	Dublin, Ireland	
Win	17–5	Justin Gonzales	Decision (unanimous)	Bellator 295	April 22, 2023	3	5:00	Honolulu, Hawaii, United States	
Loss	16–5	Pedro Carvalho	Decision (unanimous)	Bellator 285	September 23, 2022	3	5:00	Dublin, Ireland	
Loss	16–4	Ádám Borics	Decision (unanimous)	Bellator 276	March 12, 2022	5	5:00	St. Louis, Missouri, United States	
Win	16–3	Emmanuel Sanchez	Decision (unanimous)	Bellator 263	July 31, 2021	3	5:00	Los Angeles, California, United States	
Win	15–3	Saul Rogers	Submission (rear-naked choke)	Bellator 257	April 16, 2021	2	4:08	Uncasville, Connecticut, United States	
Win	14–3	Darko Banovic	TKO (punches)	Bellator 248	October 10, 2020	1	3:13	Paris, France	
Win	13–3	Steve Aimable	Decision (unanimous)	Cage Warriors 111	November 22, 2019	3	5:00	London, England	Non-title bout; Aimable missed weight (145.2 lb).
Win	12–3	Dean Trueman	Submission (Japanese necktie)	Cage Warriors 106	June 29, 2019	2	3:04	London, England	Won the Cage Warriors Featherweight Championship.
Win	11–3	Ahmed Vila	Submission (Japanese necktie)	Cage Warriors 103	March 9, 2019	1	0:50	Copenhagen, Denmark	
Win	10–3	Lukasz Rajewski	Submission (rear-naked choke)	Cage Warriors 99	November 17, 2018	1	3:23	Colchester, England	
Loss	9–3	Arnold Allen	Submission (guillotine choke)	UFC Fight Night: Thompson vs. Till	May 27, 2018	3	2:41	Liverpool, England	
Win	9–2	Mike Santiago	Decision (unanimous)	UFC Fight Night: Stephens vs. Choi	January 14, 2018	3	5:00	St. Louis, Missouri, United States	Catchweight (150 lb) bout; Burnell missed weight.
Loss	8–2	Michel Prazeres	Submission (north-south choke)	UFC Fight Night: Volkov vs. Struve	September 2, 2017	3	1:26	Rotterdam, Netherlands	Lightweight bout; Prazeres missed weight (159 lb).
Win	8–1	Fernando Duarte Bagordache	Submission (Japanese necktie)	Scottish Organisation of MMA 2	November 11, 2016	1	1:21	Glasgow, Scotland	Won the vacant SOMMA Featherweight Championship.
Win	7–1	Anthony Riggio	Submission (Japanese necktie)	MMA Galla: Gonzalez vs. Djursaa	September 17, 2016	1	N/A	Odense, Denmark	Return to Featherweight.
Win	6–1	Emerik Youmbi	Decision (unanimous)	ICE FC 12	November 5, 2016	3	5:00	Newcastle, England	
Loss	5–1	Ott Tonissaar	TKO (punches)	Octagon Athletes 2	November 7, 2015	2	N/A	Toreby, Denmark	
Win	5–0	Hyram Rodriguez	Decision (unanimous)	Shooters MMA: Battle of Copenhagen 4	October 3, 2015	3	5:00	Copenhagen, Denmark	Lightweight debut.
Win	4–0	Jamie Reynolds	Submission (armbar)	Odense Fight Night 3	April 25, 2015	1	0:30	Odense, Denmark	
Win	3–0	Nasir Aoubi	Decision (unanimous)	Trophy MMA 4	August 30, 2014	3	5:00	Malmö, Sweden	
Win	2–0	Ali Selcuk Ayin	Submission (brabo choke)	European MMA 8	February 22, 2014	1	0:50	Brondby, Denmark	
Win	1–0	Aleksander Sredanovic	Submission (brabo choke)	European MMA 6	September 26, 2013	1	N/A	Brondby, Denmark	Featherweight debut.

== See also ==
- List of male mixed martial artists
