= Mairbek Taisumov =

Russian mixed martial arts fighter

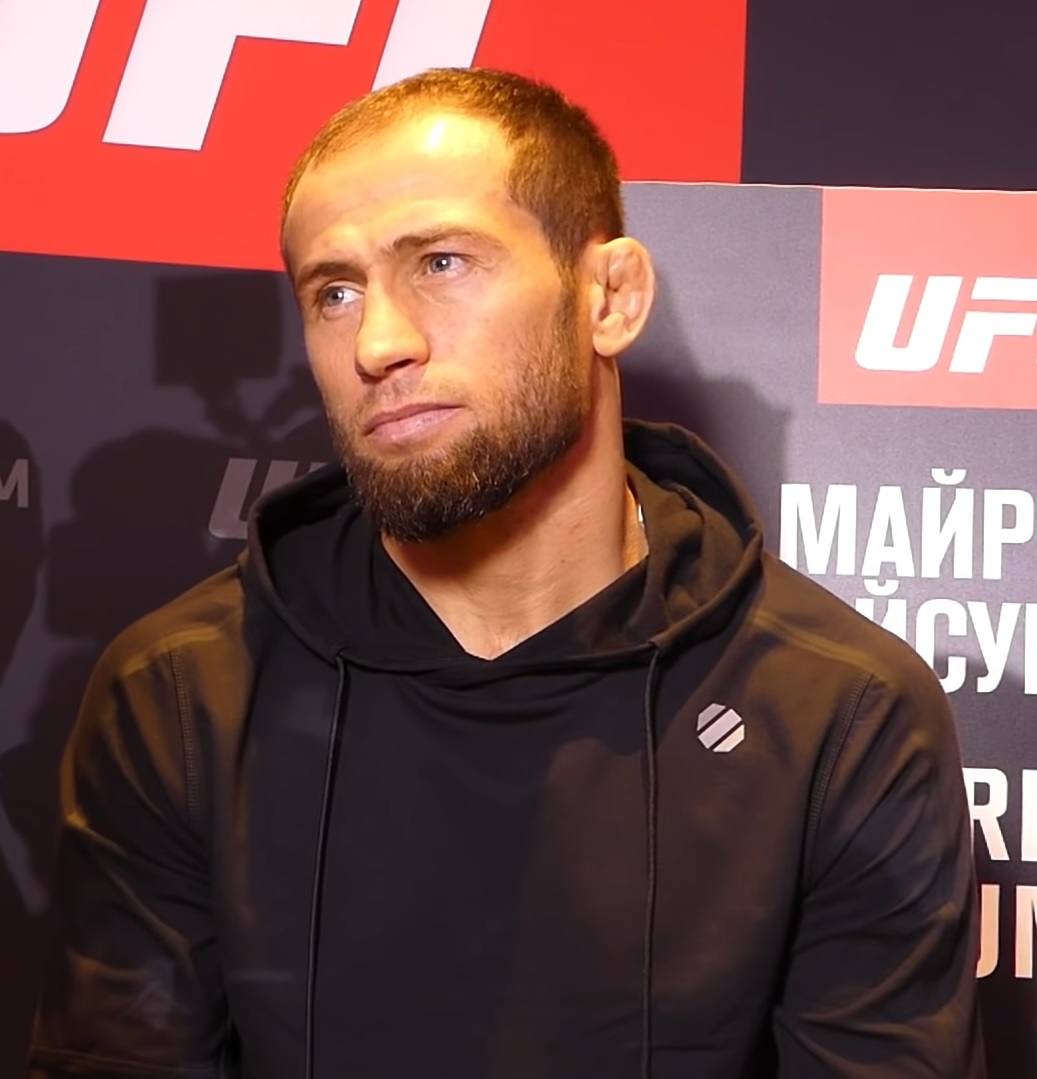
- Born: August 8, 1988 (age 38); Grozny, Checheno-Ingush ASSR, Russian SFSR, Soviet Union
- Native name: Майрбек Тайсумов
- Other names: Beckan
- Nationality: Moroccan; Austrian
- Height: 5 ft 9 in (1.75 m)
- Weight: 155 lb (70 kg; 11.1 st)
- Division: Lightweight
- Reach: 73 in (185 cm)
- Fighting out of: Vienna, Austria; Phuket, Thailand
- Team: Tiger Muay Thai; Berkut MMA
- Trainer: Muay Thai: Kru Phet; Wrestling: Zelimkhan Huseynov; MMA: Roger Huerta, George Hickman; BJJ: Alex Schild, Chris Vamos
- Years active: 2007–present

Mixed martial arts record
- Total: 33
- Wins: 27
- By knockout: 15
- By submission: 9
- By decision: 3
- Losses: 6
- By knockout: 1
- By submission: 1
- By decision: 4

Other information
- Mixed martial arts record from Sherdog

Mairbek Vakhaievich Taisumov (Russian: Майрбек Вахаевич Тайсумов; born August 8, 1988) is a Russian-born Austrian mixed martial artist. He fights in the lightweight division. A professional mixed martial artist since 2007, Taisumov has previously competed in the Ultimate Fighting Championship and M-1 Global.

== Early and personal life ==
Taisumov was born on August 8, 1988, in Grozny, the capital of the modern-day Chechen Republic of Russia. He is from the Yalkhoy (Biytro gar) teip (clan). He fights out of Vienna, Austria, and trains at MMA Vienna and Tiger Muay Thai in Phuket, Thailand. He started his sporting career as a football player before realizing fighting was his true passion and devoting his career to martial arts. He made his professional MMA debut in 2007. He is a devout Sunni Muslim. In July 2018, Taisumov got a Moroccan citizenship to aid him in getting a U.S. visa.

== Mixed martial arts career ==
=== M-1 Global ===
Taisumov spent much of his career fighting for M-1 Global. He made his M-1 Global debut against Borys Mankowski on February 5, 2010, winning via TKO in the second round.

Taisumov knocked out Julien Boussuge in the first round on May 29, 2010, at M-1 Selection 2010: Western Europe Round 3.

Taisumov submitted Serhiy Adamchuk in the first round on July 22, 2010, to win the M-1 Selection 2010: Eastern Europe Tournament.

Taisumov was poked in the eye by Artem Damkovsky in the third round of a M-1 Global Lightweight Championship bout on October 28, 2010, and lost via doctor stoppage.

Taisumov defeated M-1 veteran Yuri Ivlev by second-round TKO on March 5, 2011, at M-1 Challenge 23.

Taisumov knocked out Josh Bacallao in the first round on July 8, 2011, at M-1 Challenge 26.

Taisumov knocked out Joshua Thorpe in the second round on November 20, 2011, at M-1 Global: Fedor vs Monson.

Taisumov lost a split decision to Marat Gafurov on June 21, 2012, at M-1 Global: Fedor vs Rizzo.

Taisumov was expected to face Musa Khamanaev for the M-1 Global Lightweight Championship on November 15, 2012, at M-1 Challenge 35. The bout was cancelled for unknown reasons. Taisumov instead faced Leon Del Gaudio, whom he submitted in the first round.

Taisumov made Niko Puhakka submit to first-round leg kicks on June 8, 2013, at M-1 Challenge 40.

In his final M-1 Global bout, Taisumov submitted Artem Damkovsky in the third round of a rematch on November 30, 2013, at M-1 Challenge 44.

=== Ultimate Fighting Championship ===
Taisumov made his UFC debut against Tae Hyun Bang on January 4, 2014, at UFC Fight Night 34, winning a dominant unanimous decision.

Taisumov was expected to face UFC veteran Gleison Tibau on March 23, 2014, at UFC Fight Night 38. Tibau pulled out of the bout due to a knee injury and was replaced by Michel Prazeres, who won a dominant unanimous decision.

Taisumov beat newcomer Marcin Bandel by first-round TKO on October 4, 2014, at UFC Fight Night 53.

Taisumov was expected to face Yan Cabral on January 24, 2015, at UFC on Fox 14. Cabral pulled out of the fight due to a knee injury and was replaced by promotional newcomer Anthony Christodoulou, who Taisumov knocked out in the second round.

His contract up, Taisumov announced a new five-fight contract on Twitter on February 8, 2015.

Taisumov beat Alan Patrick by second-round TKO on June 20, 2015, at UFC Fight Night 69, earning a "Performance of the Night" bonus of $50,000.

Taisumov was expected to face Beneil Dariush on January 17, 2016, at UFC Fight Night 81. Dariush pulled out of the fight in early December citing injury and was replaced by Chris Wade. However, Taisumov was removed from the fight over reported visa issues and was replaced by Mehdi Baghdad.

Taisumov beat promotional newcomer Damir Hadžović by TKO on April 10, 2016, at UFC Fight Night 86, earning his second $50,000 "Performance of the Night" bonus.

Taisumov was expected to face Nik Lentz at UFC 203 on September 10, 2016. However, Taisumov was removed from the fight during the week before the event over reported visa issues and was replaced by promotional newcomer Michael McBride.

Taisumov was expected to face Joaquim Silva on May 28, 2017, at UFC Fight Night 109. However, Taisumov pulled out of the fight on May 16 citing a knee injury. He was replaced by Reza Madadi.

Taisumov faced UFC newcomer Felipe Silva on September 2, 2017, at UFC Fight Night: Struve vs. Volkov. He won the fight by knockout in the first round. The win earned Taisumov his third consecutive Performance of the Night bonus award.

Taisumov was expected to face Evan Dunham on April 7, 2018, at UFC 223. However, Taisumov was removed from the fight on March 9 again over reported visa issues. Dunham will now face Olivier Aubin-Mercier at the event.

Taisumov faced Desmond Green on September 15, 2018, at UFC Fight Night 136. At weigh-ins, Taisumov weighted five pounds over the lightweight non-title fight limit of 156 and was fined 40% of his purse to Green. Taisumov won the fight by unanimous decision.

On April 11, 2019, it was reported that USADA issued a six-month suspension for testing positive of stanozolol metabolites in an in-competition sample collected on September 15, 2018, at UFC Fight Night 136. USADA and World Anti-Doping Agency (WADA) determined the stanozolol metabolites were found from contaminated dietary supplements he digested. The suspension was retroactive to October 8, 2018, and he was eligible to fight again on May 8, 2019.

Taisumov faced Carlos Diego Ferreira on September 7, 2019, at UFC 242. He lost the fight by unanimous decision. The fight was the last one of his prevailing contract thus making him a free agent. Later in an interview, Taisumov told that he was entertaining offers from other promotions meanwhile holding an option to re-sign with the UFC.

== Championships and accomplishments ==
=== Mixed martial arts ===
- Ultimate Fighting Championship
  - Performance of the Night (Three times) vs. Alan Patrick, Damir Hadžović and Felipe Silva
  - Tied for fourth most consecutive knockouts in UFC history (5)

== Mixed martial arts record ==
Professional record breakdown
33 matches	27 wins	6 losses
By knockout	15	1
By submission	9	1
By decision	2	4
Unknown	1	0

Res.	Record	Opponent	Method	Event	Date	Round	Time	Location	Notes
Loss	27–6	Carlos Diego Ferreira	Decision (unanimous)	UFC 242	September 7, 2019	3	5:00	Abu Dhabi, United Arab Emirates	
Win	27–5	Desmond Green	Decision (unanimous)	UFC Fight Night: Hunt vs. Oleinik	September 15, 2018	3	5:00	Moscow, Russia	Catchweight (161 lbs) bout; Taisumov missed weight.
Win	26–5	Felipe Silva	KO (punch)	UFC Fight Night: Volkov vs. Struve	September 2, 2017	1	1:24	Rotterdam, Netherlands	Performance of the Night.
Win	25–5	Damir Hadžović	KO (punch)	UFC Fight Night: Rothwell vs. dos Santos	April 10, 2016	1	3:44	Zagreb, Croatia	Performance of the Night.
Win	24–5	Alan Patrick	TKO (head kick and punches)	UFC Fight Night: Jedrzejczyk vs. Penne	June 20, 2015	2	1:30	Berlin, Germany	Performance of the Night.
Win	23–5	Anthony Christodoulou	KO (punches)	UFC on Fox: Gustafsson vs. Johnson	January 24, 2015	2	0:38	Stockholm, Sweden	
Win	22–5	Marcin Bandel	TKO (punches)	UFC Fight Night: Nelson vs. Story	October 4, 2014	1	1:01	Stockholm, Sweden	
Loss	21–5	Michel Prazeres	Decision (unanimous)	UFC Fight Night: Shogun vs. Henderson 2	March 23, 2014	3	5:00	Natal, Brazil	Taisumov was docked 2 points: one for an illegal head kick in round 1 and another for grabbing the cage in round 2.
Win	21–4	Tae Hyun Bang	Decision (unanimous)	UFC Fight Night: Saffiedine vs. Lim	January 4, 2014	3	5:00	Marina Bay, Singapore	
Win	20–4	Artem Damkovsky	Submission (rear-naked choke)	M-1 Global - M-1 Challenge 44	November 30, 2013	3	2:25	Tula, Russia	Catchweight (163 lbs) bout.
Win	19–4	Niko Puhakka	TKO (leg kicks)	M-1 Global - M-1 Challenge 40	June 8, 2013	1	1:32	Ingushetia, Russia	
Win	18–4	Leon Del Gaudio	Submission (guillotine choke)	M-1 Challenge 35 - Emelianenko vs. Monson	November 15, 2012	1	3:45	Saint Petersburg, Russia	
Loss	17–4	Marat Gafurov	Decision (split)	M-1 Global - Fedor vs. Rizzo	June 21, 2012	3	5:00	Saint Petersburg, Russia	
Win	17–3	Luca Poclit	Submission (punches)	EMS - Middleweight Tournament Opening Round	March 24, 2012	1	1:57	Iași, Romania	
Win	16–3	Joshua Thorpe	KO (punches)	M-1 Global: Fedor vs. Monson	November 20, 2011	2	3:19	Moscow, Russia	Welterweight bout.
Win	15–3	Josh Bacallao	KO (punch)	M-1 Challenge 26: Garner vs. Bennett 2	July 8, 2011	1	2:01	Costa Mesa, California, United States	
Win	14–3	Yuri Ivlev	TKO (punches)	M-1 Challenge 23: Guram vs. Grishin	March 5, 2011	2	1:38	Moscow, Russia	
Win	13–3	Ivica Trušček	Submission (rear-naked choke)	GCF 1 - Judgement Day	December 5, 2010	1	1:19	Prague, Czech Republic	
Loss	12–3	Artem Damkovsky	TKO (doctor stoppage)	M-1 Challenge 21: Guram vs. Garner	October 28, 2010	3	2:52	Saint Petersburg, Russia	For the inaugural M-1 Global Lightweight Championship.
Win	12–2	Serhiy Adamchuk	Submission (rear-naked choke)	M-1 Selection 2010: Eastern Europe Finals	July 22, 2010	1	3:04	Moscow, Russia	Won the M-1 Selection Eastern Europe Tournament.
Win	11–2	Julien Boussuge	KO (punch)	M-1 Selection 2010: Western Europe Round 3	May 29, 2010	1	4:11	Uusimaa, Finland	
Win	10–2	Petr Cajnak	Submission (rear-naked choke)	HC 5 - Hell Cage 5	March 28, 2010	1	0:26	Prague, Czech Republic	
Win	9–2	Borys Mańkowski	TKO (punches)	M-1 Selection 2010: Western Europe Round 1	February 5, 2010	2	0:55	Hilversum, Netherlands	
Win	8–2	Markus Niskanen	TKO (punches)	Cage 11 - Battle of Nations	November 21, 2009	2	4:58	Kanta-Häme, Finland	
Win	7–2	Olivier Elizabeth	Submission (rear-naked choke)	HC 4 - Hell Cage 4	September 20, 2009	1	1:32	Prague, Czech Republic	
Win	6–2	Jarkko Latomaki	TKO (injury)	BP - Fight Night Vaasa	July 11, 2009	1	1:32	Ostrobothnia, Finland	
Loss	5–2	Vener Galiev	Decision (unanimous)	Gladiator - 2009	May 23, 2009	2	5:00	Prague, Czech Republic	
Win	5–1	David Rosmon	KO (knee)	HC 3 - Hell Cage 3	March 29, 2009	1	4:10	Prague, Czech Republic	
Loss	4–1	Ivan Buchinger	Submission (bulldog choke)	HC 2 - Hell Cage 2	October 19, 2008	2	3:12	Prague, Czech Republic	
Win	4–0	Maxim Usmaniev	Submission (armbar)	FA 3 - Fight Arena 3	June 14, 2008	1	0:00	Prague, Czech Republic	
Win	3–0	Oto Merlin	TKO (punches)	FSC 1 - Fight Stage Championship 1	June 2, 2008	0	0:00	Košice, Slovakia	
Win	2–0	Jaroslav Poborský	KO (punches)	GFF 7 - Gladiators Free Fight 7	May 8, 2008	1	1:44	Prague, Czech Republic	
Win	1–0	Vaclav Pribyl	Submission (armbar)	CF 2 - Cage Fighting 2	February 24, 2007	2	0:00	Mecklenburg-Vorpommern, Germany	

== See also ==
- List of current UFC fighters
- List of male mixed martial artists
