= PFL 5 (2024) =

Professional Fighters League MMA event in 2024

- The poster for PFL 5
- Promotion: Professional Fighters League
- Date: June 21, 2024
- Venue: Jon M. Huntsman Center
- City: Salt Lake City, Utah, United States

Event chronology
PFL 4	PFL 5	PFL 6

The PFL 5 mixed martial arts event for the 2024 season of the Professional Fighters League was held on June 21, 2024, at the Jon M. Huntsman Center in Salt Lake City, Utah, United States. This marked the fifth regular-season event of the tournament and included fights in the Lightweight and Light Heavyweight divisions.

== Background ==
This event marked the organization's first visit to Salt Lake City and Utah state.

A lightweight bout between Clay Collard and former Cage Warriors Featherweight Champion Mads Burnell headlined the event.

A light heavyweight bout between Laurynas Urbonavicius and Karl Albrektsson was scheduled for this event. However, Urbonavicius pulled out for unknown reason and was replaced by former KSW Light Heavyweight Champion Ibragim Chuzhigaev. In turn, Chuzhigaev pulled out and was replaced by The Ultimate Fighter: Team Joanna vs. Team Cláudia light heavyweight winner Andrew Sanchez. Subsequently, Sanchez stepped in to face 2022 PFL welterweight winner Sadibou Sy after Tom Breese withdrew at the last minute and the bout against Albrektsson was cancelled.

At the weigh-ins, Solomon Renfro came in at 156.4 lbs, 0.4 pounds over the lightweight limit. He was fined a percent of his purse and given a point deduction in the standings.

== Results ==
Main card (ESPN / ESPN+)
Weight class				Method	Round	Time	Notes
Lightweight	Mads Burnell	def.	Clay Collard	Decision (unanimous) (29–28, 29–28, 29–28)	3	5:00
Light Heavyweight	Impa Kasanganay	def.	Jakob Nedoh	TKO (doctor stoppage)	2	5:00
Lightweight	Bruno Miranda	def.	Patricky Pitbull	Decision (split) (29–28, 28–29, 29–28)	3	5:00
Light Heavyweight	Rob Wilkinson	def.	Josh Silveira	Decision (split) (28–29, 29–28, 29–28)	3	5:00
Light Heavyweight	Dovletdzhan Yagshimuradov	def.	Simon Biyong	Decision (unanimous) (30–27, 30–27, 30–27)	3	5:00
Light Heavyweight	Alex Polizzi	def.	Antônio Carlos Júnior	Decision (unanimous) (29–28, 29–28, 29–28)	3	5:00
Preliminary card (ESPN+)
Lightweight	Brent Primus	def.	Solomon Renfro	Submission (rear-naked choke)	3	3:21	(Note: Renfro missed weight (156.4 lb).)
Light Heavyweight	Sadibou Sy	def.	Andrew Sanchez	TKO (punches)	3	4:02
Lightweight	Gadzhi Rabadanov	def.	Elvin Espinoza	Decision (unanimous) (30–27, 30–27, 30–27)	3	5:00
Lightweight	Adam Piccolotti	def.	Michael Dufort	Decision (split) (29–28, 28–29, 29–28)	3	5:00
Lightweight	Sergio Cossio	def.	Anthony Romero	Decision (unanimous) (29–28, 29–28, 29–28)	3	5:00
Lightweight	Brayhan Zurcher	def.	Julian Ruiz	KO (punch)	2	1:26

== Standings after event ==
The PFL points system is based on results of the match. The winner of a fight receives 3 points. If the fight ends in a draw, both fighters will receive 1 point. The bonus for winning a fight in the first, second, or third round is 3 points, 2 points, and 1 point respectively. The bonus for winning in the third round requires a fight be stopped before 4:59 of the third round. No bonus point will be awarded if a fighter wins via decision. For example, if a fighter wins a fight in the first round, then the fighter will receive 6 total points. A decision win will result in three total points. If a fighter misses weight, the opponent (should they comply with weight limits) will receive 3 points due to a walkover victory, regardless of winning or losing the bout; if the non-offending fighter subsequently wins with a stoppage, all bonus points will be awarded.

=== Light heavyweight ===
Fighter	Wins	Draws	Losses	1st	2nd	3rd	Total Points (Note: The four fighters with most points advance to the playoffs)
♛ (United States) Impa Kasanganay	2	0	0	1	1	0	11
♛ (Australia) Rob Wilkinson	2	0	0	1	0	0	9
♛ (Turkmenistan) Dovletdzhan Yagshimuradov	2	0	0	1	0	0	9
♛ (United States) Josh Silveira	1	0	1	1	0	0	6
E (Brazil) Antônio Carlos Júnior	1	0	1	1	0	0	6
E (Sweden) Sadibou Sy	1	0	1	0	0	0	4
E (United States) Alex Polizzi	1	0	1	0	0	0	3
E (United States) Andrew Sanchez	0	0	1	0	0	0	0
E (United Kingdom) Tom Breese	0	0	1	0	0	0	0
E (Slovenia) Jakob Nedoh	0	0	2	0	0	0	0
E (Cameroon) Simon Biyong	0	0	2	0	0	0	0

=== Lightweight ===
Fighter	Wins	Draws	Losses	1st	2nd	3rd	Total Points (Note: The four fighters with most points advance to the playoffs)
♛ (United States) Brent Primus	2	0	0	0	1	1	9
♛ (Russia) Gadzhi Rabadanov	2	0	0	0	0	0	6
♛ (Canada) Michael Dufort	1	0	1	0	1	0	5
♛ (United States) Clay Collard	1	0	1	0	1	0	5
E (Nicaragua) Elvin Espinoza	1	0	1	0	0	1	4
E (United States) Adam Piccolotti	1	0	1	0	0	0	3
E (Denmark) Mads Burnell	1	0	1	0	0	0	3
E (Brazil) Bruno Miranda	1	0	1	0	0	0	3
E (Brazil) Patricky Pitbull	0	0	2	0	0	0	0
E (United States) Solomon Renfro	0	0	2	0	0	0	-1

== See also ==
- List of PFL events
- List of current PFL fighters
