= Guram Kutateladze (fighter) =

Georgian mixed martial artist (born 1992)

- Born: January 8, 1992 (age 34); Tbilisi, Georgia
- Other names: Georgian Viking
- Height: 5 ft 11 in (180 cm)
- Weight: 155 lb (70 kg; 11 st 1 lb)
- Division: Lightweight

Mixed martial arts record
- Total: 20
- Wins: 14
- By knockout: 8
- By submission: 1
- By decision: 5
- Losses: 6
- By knockout: 1
- By submission: 1
- By decision: 4

Other information
- Mixed martial arts record from Sherdog

Guram Kutateladze (born January 8, 1992) is a Georgian mixed martial arts fighter. He formerly competed in the Lightweight division of the Ultimate Fighting Championship (UFC). He has been competing professionally since 2010, known for participating in tournaments of the IRFA (International Ring Fight Arena) and Brave CF organizations.

== Early life ==
Kutateladze was born on 8 January 1992 in Tbilisi, Georgia. He spent his childhood and youth in his native Georgia. From a very young age, he began training in martial arts; according to his UFC profile, he says he started training when he was four years old. He received special motivation after attending his first professional MMA fight in Moscow at the age of 11.

He lived in Malmö, Sweden for some time. Later, he began training at the All-Stars Gym in Sweden. He met mixed martial arts fighter Alexander Gustafsson, as well as another UFC fighter of Chechen origin, Khamzat Chimaev, who at that time was fighting for Sweden. Over his formative years, he competed in various combat sports, including Sambo and K-1 / Muay Thai.

== Professional career ==
Kutateladze made his debut in 2010. He won his first career victory in the Georgian promotion M-1 Georgia, where he won by submission, then fought in the promotion "FFC", where he defeated Erik Flieberg by technical knockout. On March 23, 2013, he appeared in the promotion "HFC" against Jonathan Svensson, whom he defeated by knockout.

On September 21, 2018, Kutateladze fought for Brave Combat Federation against Erik Carlos Silva, where he won by unanimous decision. His last fight for Brave CF was on November 15, 2019, when he defeated Felipe Silva by knockout in the first round at the tournament.

On October 17, 2020, he beat Mateusz Gamrot in the Ultimate Fighting Championship, at UFC Fight Night: Ortega vs. Korean Zombie.

== Mixed martial arts record ==
Professional record breakdown
20 matches	14 wins	6 losses
By knockout	8	1
By submission	1	1
By decision	5	4

Res.	Record	Opponent	Method	Event	Date	Round	Time	Location	Notes
Loss	14–6	Jeremy Kennedy	Decision (unanimous)	Vault Fighting League 1	September 12, 2026	3	5:00	Dubai, United Arab Emirates	
Win	14–5	Victor Hugo	TKO (punches)	ACA 194	October 23, 2025	1	2:44	Dubai, United Arab Emirates	
Loss	13–5	Kauê Fernandes	Decision (unanimous)	UFC Fight Night: Edwards vs. Brady	March 22, 2025	3	5:00	London, England	
Win	13–4	Jordan Vucenic	Decision (unanimous)	UFC on ABC: Sandhagen vs. Nurmagomedov	August 3, 2024	3	5:00	Abu Dhabi, United Arab Emirates	
Loss	12–4	Elves Brener	TKO (punches)	UFC on ESPN: Strickland vs. Magomedov	July 1, 2023	3	3:17	Las Vegas, Nevada, United States	
Loss	12–3	Damir Ismagulov	Decision (split)	UFC on ESPN: Kattar vs. Emmett	June 18, 2022	3	5:00	Austin, Texas, United States	Originally announced as a majority decision due to a miscalculation in scores.
Win	12–2	Mateusz Gamrot	Decision (split)	UFC Fight Night: Ortega vs. The Korean Zombie	October 17, 2020	3	5:00	Abu Dhabi, United Arab Emirates	Fight of the Night.
Win	11–2	Felipe Silva	KO (punches)	Brave CF 29	November 15, 2019	1	0:44	Isa Town, Bahrain	
Win	10–2	Guilherme Cadena	TKO (punches)	Superior Challenge 18	December 1, 2018	1	3:00	Stockholm, Sweden	
Win	9–2	Erick da Silva	Decision (unanimous)	Brave CF 16	September 21, 2018	3	5:00	Abu Dhabi, United Arab Emirates	
Win	8–2	Nicolas Joannes	TKO (punches)	Superior Challenge 17	May 19, 2018	1	4:00	Stockholm, Sweden	Catchweight (151 lb) bout.
Win	7–2	Gocha Smoyan	KO (knees)	International Ring Fight Arena 10	September 17, 2016	2	3:23	Stockholm, Sweden	
Win	6–2	Arturo Chavez	Decision (unanimous)	Scandinavian Fight Nights 1	June 4, 2016	3	5:00	Stockholm, Sweden	
Win	5–2	Joachim Tollefsen	Decision (unanimous)	International Ring Fight Arena 9	September 26, 2015	3	5:00	Solna, Sweden	
Win	4–2	Zsolt Fényes	TKO (punches)	Austrian Fight Challenge 1	June 20, 2015	3	2:30	Vienna, Austria	
Loss	3–2	Paweł Kiełek	Submission (kneebar)	Fight Exclusive Night 6	March 6, 2015	1	1:15	Wrocław, Poland	Catchweight (160 lb) bout.
Loss	3–1	Oliver Enkamp	Decision (unanimous)	International Ring Fight Arena 6	April 5, 2014	3	5:00	Solna, Sweden	Catchweight (161 lb) bout.
Win	3–0	Jonathan Svensson	KO (punches)	Heroes FC 1	March 23, 2013	3	N/A	Halmstad, Sweden	
Win	2–0	Erik Friberg	TKO (punches)	Fight for Change 2	February 9, 2013	2	2:36	Oskarshamn, Sweden	Lightweight debut.
Win	1–0	Dmitriy Izoria	Submission (armbar)	Mix Fight Georgia 2010	May 15, 2010	1	N/A	Tbilisi, Georgia	Welterweight debut.

== Karate Combat record ==
Professional record breakdown
2 matches	2 wins	0 losses
By knockout	1	0
By decision	1	0

Res.	Record	Opponent	Method	Event	Date	Round	Time	Location	Notes
Win	2–0	Lucas Almeida	Decision (unanimous)	Karate Combat 61	May 2, 2026	3	3:00	Miami, Florida	Catchweight (165 lbs).
Win	1–0	Kadir Dalkiran	TKO (retirement)	Karate Combat 60	March 27, 2026	2	3:00	Yekaterinburg, Russia	Catchweight (160 lbs).

== Muay Thai record ==
Professional Muay Thai record
Date	Result	Opponent	Event	Location	Method	Round	Time
2014-09-20	Loss	(Sweden) Sanny Dahlbeck	Battle of Lund 6	Lund, Sweden	Decision (unanimous)	5	3:00
2013-10-05	Win	(United Kingdom) Sam Wilson	Battle of Lund 5	Lund, Sweden	TKO (retirement)	2	3:00
Legend: Win Loss Draw/No contest Notes

== See also ==
- List of male mixed martial artists
