= UFC Fight Night: Volkov vs. Struve =

UFC mixed martial arts event in 2017

- The poster for UFC Fight Night: Volkov vs. Struve
- Promotion: Ultimate Fighting Championship
- Date: September 2, 2017
- Venue: Rotterdam Ahoy
- City: Rotterdam, Netherlands
- Attendance: 10,224
- Total gate: $900,000

Event chronology
UFC Fight Night: Pettis vs. Moreno	UFC Fight Night: Volkov vs. Struve	UFC 215: Nunes vs. Shevchenko 2

UFC Fight Night: Volkov vs. Struve (also known as UFC Fight Night 115) was a mixed martial arts event produced by the Ultimate Fighting Championship held on September 2, 2017 at Rotterdam Ahoy in Rotterdam, Netherlands.

== Background ==
A heavyweight bout between former Bellator Heavyweight Champion Alexander Volkov and Stefan Struve headlined the event.

Promotional newcomer Abu Azaitar was expected to face Siyar Bahadurzada at the event, but pulled out in early August and was replaced by fellow newcomer Rob Wilkinson.

Also in early August, Islam Makhachev pulled out of a scheduled bout against Michel Prazeres and was replaced by another newcomer in Mads Burnell.

On August 11, Marcos Rogério de Lima was pulled from his bout against Saparbek Safarov after being flagged by the U.S. Anti-Doping Agency (USADA) for a potential anti-doping violation stemming from an out-of-competition sample collected on August 1. Subsequently, Safarov was also forced from the card with a rib injury.

Nick Hein was expected to face promotional newcomer Zabit Magomedsharipov at this event, but pulled out on August 21 due to injury. Hein was replaced by promotional newcomer Mike Santiago .

Former UFC Women's Featherweight Champion Germaine de Randamie was expected to face Marion Reneau at the event. However, de Randamie pulled out of the fight on August 25 citing injury. She was replaced by promotional newcomer Talita Bernardo.

At the weigh ins, Michel Prazeres missed the lightweight limit of 156 pounds, coming in at 159 pounds. As a result his bout with Mads Burnell was changed to a catchweight and Prazeres was fined 20% of his purse.

== Results ==
Main Card (UFC Fight Pass)
Weight class				Method	Round	Time	Notes
Heavyweight	Alexander Volkov	def.	Stefan Struve	TKO (punches)	3	3:30
Middleweight	Siyar Bahadurzada	def.	Rob Wilkinson	TKO (punches)	2	3:10
Women's Bantamweight	Marion Reneau	def.	Talita Bernardo	TKO (punches)	3	4:54
Welterweight	Leon Edwards	def.	Bryan Barberena	Decision (unanimous) (29–28, 29–28, 29–28)	3	5:00
Preliminary Card (UFC Fight Pass)
Welterweight	Darren Till	def.	Bojan Veličković	Decision (unanimous) (30–27, 30–27, 30–27)	3	5:00
Lightweight	Mairbek Taisumov	def.	Felipe Silva	KO (punch)	1	1:24
Catchweight (159 lb)	Michel Prazeres	def.	Mads Burnell	Submission (north-south choke)	3	1:26
Lightweight	Rustam Khabilov	def.	Desmond Green	Decision (unanimous) (29–28, 29–28, 30–27)	3	5:00
Light Heavyweight	Aleksandar Rakić	def.	Francimar Barroso	Decision (unanimous) (30–27, 30–27, 30–27)	3	5:00
Featherweight	Zabit Magomedsharipov	def.	Mike Santiago	Submission (rear-naked choke)	2	4:22
Light Heavyweight	Abdul-Kerim Edilov	def.	Bojan Mihajlović	TKO (punches)	2	2:32
Lightweight	Thibault Gouti	def.	Andrew Holbrook	TKO (punches)	1	4:28

== Bonus awards ==
The following fighters were awarded $50,000 bonuses:

- Fight of the Night: Alexander Volkov vs. Stefan Struve
- Performance of the Night: Mairbek Taisumov and Zabit Magomedsharipov

== See also ==
- List of UFC events
- 2017 in UFC
