= Zabit Magomedsharipov =

Russian mixed martial artist (born 1991)

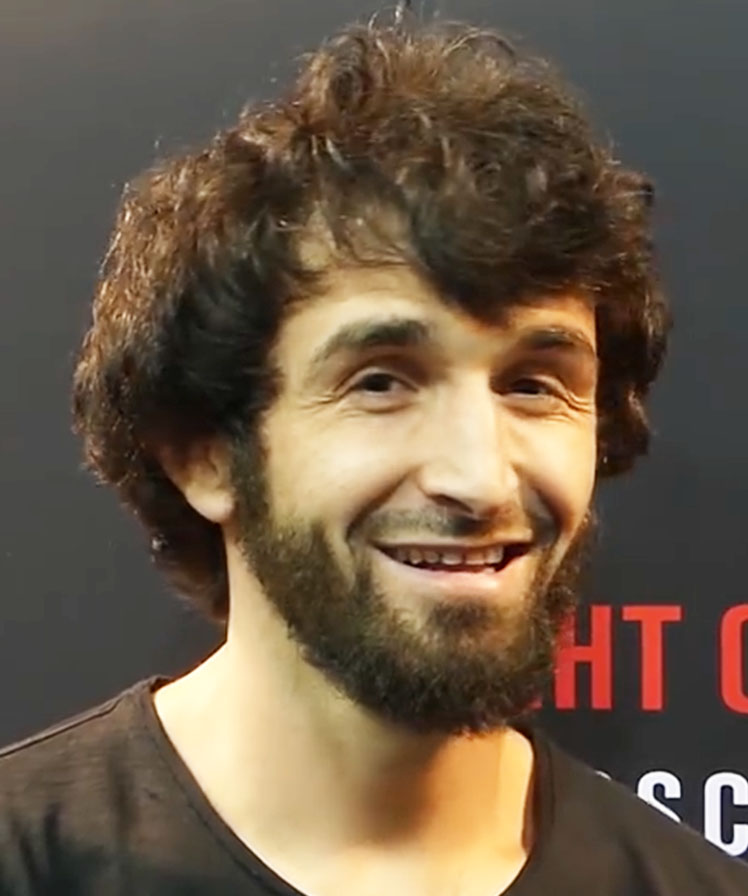
- Magomedsharipov in 2018
- Born: Zabit Akhmedovich Magomedsharipov; March 1, 1991 (age 35); Khasavyurt, Dagestan ASSR, Russian SFSR, Soviet Union
- Height: 6 ft 1 in (185 cm)
- Weight: 145 lb (66 kg; 10.4 st)
- Division: Featherweight (2014–2020); Lightweight (2012–2013)
- Reach: 73 in (185 cm)
- Style: Sanda
- Fighting out of: Khasavyurt, Dagestan, Russia; Brick Township, New Jersey, U.S.
- Team: DagFighter; Ricardo Almeida BJJ; Nick Catone MMA
- Trainer: Mansur Uchakaev; Ricardo Almeida; Nick Catone; Mark Henry
- Years active: 2012–2020

Mixed martial arts record
- Total: 19
- Wins: 18
- By knockout: 6
- By submission: 7
- By decision: 5
- Losses: 1
- By submission: 1

Other information
- Notable relatives: Khasan Magomedsharipov (brother)
- Notable school: Five Directions of the World
- Mixed martial arts record from Sherdog

Zabit Akhmedovich Magomedsharipov (Russian: Забит Ахмедович Магомедшарипов; born March 1, 1991) is a Russian former professional mixed martial artist. He competed in the Featherweight division of the Ultimate Fighting Championship (UFC) and Absolute Championship Berkut (ACB), where he was the ACB Featherweight Champion.

== Background ==
Magomedsharipov was born in Khasavyurt, Dagestan ASSR, Soviet Union, on March 1, 1991, of Akhvakh ethnicity. Zabit has a younger brother, Khasan Magomedsharipov, who is also a professional mixed martial artist. He started to train in freestyle wrestling at 11 years and then sanda. In 2003, he joined the Five Directions of the World wushu boarding school, where he lived for 10 to 12 years for education and trained martial arts three times per day, under Gusein Magomaev, the school's co-founder. In 2012, he made his professional MMA debut. In December 2019, his brother followed in his footsteps by making his professional MMA debut. Magomedsharipov became well known during a period where fighters from Dagestan earned a reputation as formidable opponents in the UFC.

== Mixed martial arts career ==
=== Early career ===
Magomedsharipov fought in a handful of different promotions early in his career, amassing a professional record of 6-1 before signing with ACB.

=== Absolute Championship Berkut ===
Magomedsharipov went 6–0 in the ACB and was featherweight champion.

=== Ultimate Fighting Championship ===
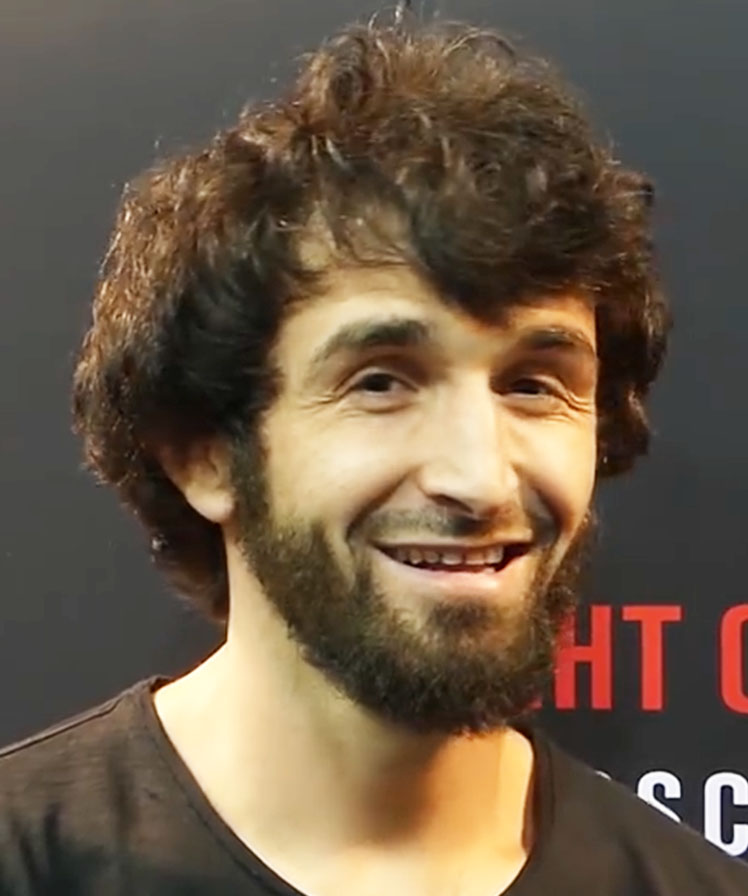
Zabit Magomedsharipov at UFC Fight Night 136 on Sep 15, 2018

Magomedsharipov signed a four-fight deal with the UFC in May 2017.

Magomedsharipov was expected to face Nick Hein on September 2, 2017, at UFC Fight Night: Struve vs. Volkov. However, Hein pulled out of the fight on August 21 and was replaced by Mike Santiago. Magomedsharipov won the fight via submission with a rear-naked choke in the second round and was awarded a Performance of the Night bonus.

Magomedsharipov faced promotional newcomer Sheymon Moraes on November 25, 2017, at UFC Fight Night: Bisping vs. Gastelum. He won the fight via submission in the third round. The win also earned Magomedsharipov his second Performance of the Night bonus award.

Magomedsharipov faced Kyle Bochniak on April 7, 2018, at UFC 223. He won the fight by unanimous decision. This win again earned him a Fight of the Night bonus. Shortly after the bout, Magomedsharipov signed a new multi-fight contract with UFC.

Magomedsharipov was expected to fight Yair Rodríguez on September 8, 2018, at UFC 228. However, Rodríguez pulled out of the fight on August 23 and was replaced by Brandon Davis. Magomedsharipov won the fight via submission in the second round with a modified kneebar.

Magomedsharipov faced Jeremy Stephens on March 2, 2019, at UFC 235. He won the fight by unanimous decision.

Magomedsharipov was expected to face Calvin Kattar on October 18, 2019, at UFC on ESPN 6. However, Magomedsharipov was removed from the card due to injury on September 13 and the pairing was rescheduled for the following month at UFC on ESPN+ 21. He won the fight via unanimous decision. This fight earned him the Fight of the Night award.

Magomedsharipov was scheduled to face Yair Rodríguez on August 29, 2020, at UFC Fight Night 175. However, Rodríguez pulled out with an ankle injury.

On April 26, 2021, Magomedsharipov was removed from the UFC official rankings due to inactivity. At the time of removal he was ranked #3. In early June 2021, it was reported that Magomedsharipov was suffering from health issues related to his immune system, which ultimately required career-threatening surgery.

In September 2021, Mark Henry announced that Magomedsharipov would be returning to the UFC soon.

In June 2022, Magomedsharipov notified the UFC that he was retiring from active competition.

He is currently coaching his younger brother, Khasan Magomedsharipov. According to his younger brother, Khasan, Zabit is interested in competing in wrestling and grappling competitions in the future.

== Championships and accomplishments ==
=== Mixed martial arts ===
- Ultimate Fighting Championship
  - Performance of the Night (Two times) vs. Mike Santiago and Sheymon Moraes
  - Fight of the Night (Two times) vs. Kyle Bochniak and Calvin Kattar
  - UFC.com Awards
    - 2017: Ranked #5 Newcomer of the Year & Ranked #10 Submission of the Year vs. Sheymon Moraes
    - 2018: Ranked #10 Fight of the Year vs. Kyle Bochniak & Ranked #3 Submission of the Year vs. Brandon Davis (Tied with Aljamain Sterling)
- Absolute Championship Berkut
  - ACB Featherweight Championship (One time)
    - One successful title defense
  - Absolute Championship Berkut Grand-Prix winner
- MMADNA.nl
  - 2017 European Newcomer of the Year.
  - 2018 Submission of the Year.
- Ariel Helwani's show
  - Submission of the Year 2018 vs. Brandon Davis
- World MMA Awards
  - 2018 Submission of the Year vs. Brandon Davis at UFC 228

=== Sanda ===
- Russian champion (4x)
- European champion
- World cup winner

== Mixed martial arts record ==
Professional record breakdown
19 matches	18 wins	1 loss
By knockout	6	0
By submission	7	1
By decision	5	0

Res.	Record	Opponent	Method	Event	Date	Round	Time	Location	Notes
Win	18–1	Calvin Kattar	Decision (unanimous)	UFC Fight Night: Magomedsharipov vs. Kattar	November 9, 2019	3	5:00	Moscow, Russia	Fight of the Night.
Win	17–1	Jeremy Stephens	Decision (unanimous)	UFC 235	March 2, 2019	3	5:00	Las Vegas, Nevada, United States	
Win	16–1	Brandon Davis	Submission (hamstring stretch)	UFC 228	September 8, 2018	2	4:36	Dallas, Texas, United States	
Win	15–1	Kyle Bochniak	Decision (unanimous)	UFC 223	April 7, 2018	3	5:00	Brooklyn, New York, United States	Fight of the Night.
Win	14–1	Sheymon Moraes	Submission (anaconda choke)	UFC Fight Night: Bisping vs. Gastelum	November 25, 2017	3	4:30	Shanghai, China	Performance of the Night.
Win	13–1	Mike Santiago	Submission (rear-naked choke)	UFC Fight Night: Volkov vs. Struve	September 2, 2017	2	4:22	Rotterdam, Netherlands	Performance of the Night.
Win	12–1	Valdines Silva	TKO (punches)	ACB 45	September 17, 2016	1	1:54	Saint Petersburg, Russia	Defended the ACB Featherweight Championship. Later vacated title.
Win	11–1	Sheikh-Magomed Arapkhanov	KO (punch)	ACB 31	March 9, 2016	1	4:19	Grozny, Russia	Won the inaugural ACB Featherweight Championship.
Win	10–1	Abdul-Rakhman Temirov	Submission (guillotine choke)	ACB 24	October 24, 2015	1	4:16	Moscow, Russia	Won the 2015 ACB Featherweight Grand Prix.
Win	9–1	Mukhamed Kokov	TKO (arm injury)	ACB 20	June 14, 2015	2	3:57	Sochi, Russia	2015 ACB Featherweight Grand Prix Semifinal.
Win	8–1	Artak Nazaryan	TKO (retirement)	ACB 15	March 21, 2015	2	4:08	Nalchik, Russia	2015 ACB Featherweight Grand Prix Quarterfinal; Magomedsharipov missed weight (149.9 lb).
Win	7–1	Orudzh Zamanov	Submission (guillotine choke)	ACB 11	November 14, 2014	2	3:46	Grozny, Russia	
Win	6–1	Sarmat Hodov	Decision (unanimous)	Oplot Challenge 88	November 16, 2013	2	1:11	Kharkov, Ukraine	Lightweight bout.
Win	5–1	Sergei Sokolov	Submission (triangle choke)	Fight Nights: Krepost Selection 1	September 20, 2013	2	2:49	Moscow, Russia	Featherweight debut.
Loss	4–1	Igor Egorov	Submission (armbar)	ProFC 47	April 14, 2013	3	1:27	Rostov-on-Don, Russia	2012 ProFC Lightweight Tournament Final.
Win	4–0	Iftikhor Arbobov	TKO (doctor stoppage)	ProFC 44	December 2, 2012	2	5:00	Chekhov, Russia	2012 ProFC Lightweight Tournament Semifinal.
Win	3–0	Abkerim Yunusov	Submission (rear-naked choke)	ProFC 42	October 13, 2012	2	2:42	Kharkiv, Ukraine	2012 ProFC Lightweight Tournament Quarterfinal.
Win	2–0	Timur Bolatov	Decision (unanimous)	Kavkaz League: Battle in Khasavyurt	July 3, 2012	2	5:00	Khasavyurt, Russia	
Win	1–0	Zhumageldy Zhetpisbayev	TKO (punches)	Grand European FC: Odesa Golden Cup 2012	May 9, 2012	3	2:45	Odesa, Ukraine	Lightweight debut.

=== Mixed martial arts amateur record ===
Professional record breakdown
1 match	0 wins	1 loss
By submission	0	1

Res.	Record	Opponent	Method	Event	Date	Round	Time	Location	Notes
Loss	0–1	Rakhman Makhazhiev	Submission (armbar)	M-1 Challenge 34	September 30, 2012	2	4:49	Moscow, Russia	

== See also ==
- List of male mixed martial artists
