= UFC Fight Night: Machida vs. Anders =

UFC mixed martial arts event in 2018

- The poster for UFC Fight Night: Machida vs. Anders
- Promotion: Ultimate Fighting Championship
- Date: February 3, 2018
- Venue: Arena Guilherme Paraense
- City: Belém, Brazil
- Attendance: 10,144

Event chronology
| UFC on Fox: Jacaré vs. Brunson 2 | UFC Fight Night: Machida vs. Anders | UFC 221: Rockhold vs. Romero |

UFC Fight Night: Machida vs. Anders (also known as UFC Fight Night 125) was a mixed martial arts event produced by the Ultimate Fighting Championship held on February 3, 2018, at Arena Guilherme Paraense in Belém, Brazil.

== Background ==
While the UFC has hosted several events in Northeast Brazil, the event marked the promotion's first visit to Pará in the country's North region.

A middleweight bout between former UFC Light Heavyweight Champion Lyoto Machida and Eryk Anders headlined this event.

Luis Henrique was scheduled to face Timothy Johnson at the event. However, Henrique was removed from the pairing in early December and was replaced by Marcelo Golm.

At the weigh-ins Michel Prazeres weighed in at 161 pounds, 5 pounds over the lightweight non title fight upper limit of 156 pounds. As a result, the bout proceeded at catchweight and Prazeres was fined 20% of his purse which went to his opponent Desmond Green. Pedro Munhoz also missed weight, 4 pounds over the bantamweight non title fight upper limit of 136 pounds. In turn, his bout against former UFC Flyweight Championship challenger and The Ultimate Fighter: Team Bisping vs. Team Miller bantamweight winner John Dodson was pulled from the card after Dodson declined to take the fight. Meanwhile, Prazeres was supposed to weigh a maximum of 173 pounds on the night of the event for the fight to proceed as scheduled, but according to Green's camp, Prazeres weighed in at 180 pounds. Despite that, Green still accepted the fight and Prazeres gave him 40% of his purse.

== Results ==
Main card (Fox Sports 1)
| Weight class | | | | Method | Round | Time | Notes |
|---|---|---|---|---|---|---|---|
| Middleweight | Lyoto Machida | def. | Eryk Anders | Decision (split) (48–47, 47–48, 49–46) | 5 | 5:00 |
| Women's Flyweight | Valentina Shevchenko | def. | Priscila Cachoeira | Submission (rear-naked choke) | 2 | 4:25 |
| Catchweight (161 lb) | Michel Prazeres | def. | Desmond Green | Decision (unanimous) (30–27, 29–28, 29–28) | 3 | 5:00 |
| Heavyweight | Timothy Johnson | def. | Marcelo Golm | Decision (unanimous) (30–27, 29–28, 29–28) | 3 | 5:00 |
| Bantamweight | Douglas Silva de Andrade | def. | Marlon Vera | Decision (unanimous) (30–27, 30–27, 30–27) | 3 | 5:00 |
| Middleweight | Thiago Santos | def. | Anthony Smith | TKO (body kick and punches) | 2 | 1:03 |
Preliminary card (Fox Sports 2)
| Welterweight | Sérgio Moraes | def. | Tim Means | Decision (split) (28–29, 29–28, 29–28) | 3 | 5:00 |
| Lightweight | Alan Patrick | def. | Damir Hadžović | Decision (unanimous) (30–25, 30–27, 30–27) | 3 | 5:00 |
| Women's Strawweight | Polyana Viana | def. | Maia Stevenson | Submission (rear-naked choke) | 1 | 3:50 |
| Bantamweight | Iuri Alcântara | def. | Joe Soto | TKO (body kick and punches) | 1 | 1:06 |
Preliminary card (UFC Fight Pass)
| Flyweight | Deiveson Figueiredo | def. | Joseph Morales | TKO (punches) | 2 | 4:34 |

== Bonus awards ==
The following fighters were awarded $50,000 bonuses:

- Fight of the Night: Thiago Santos vs. Anthony Smith
- Performance of the Night: Valentina Shevchenko and Iuri Alcântara

== See also ==
- List of UFC events
- List of current UFC fighters
- 2018 in UFC
