= We Love MMA =

together Promotion GmbH
- Type: Private
- Industry: Mixed martial arts promotion
- Founded: 2010
- Headquarters: Germany
- Key people: Marcus Wortmeier

We Love MMA is a mixed martial arts event series in Germany organized by together Promotion GmbH. Since 2010, the organization has held 48 events.

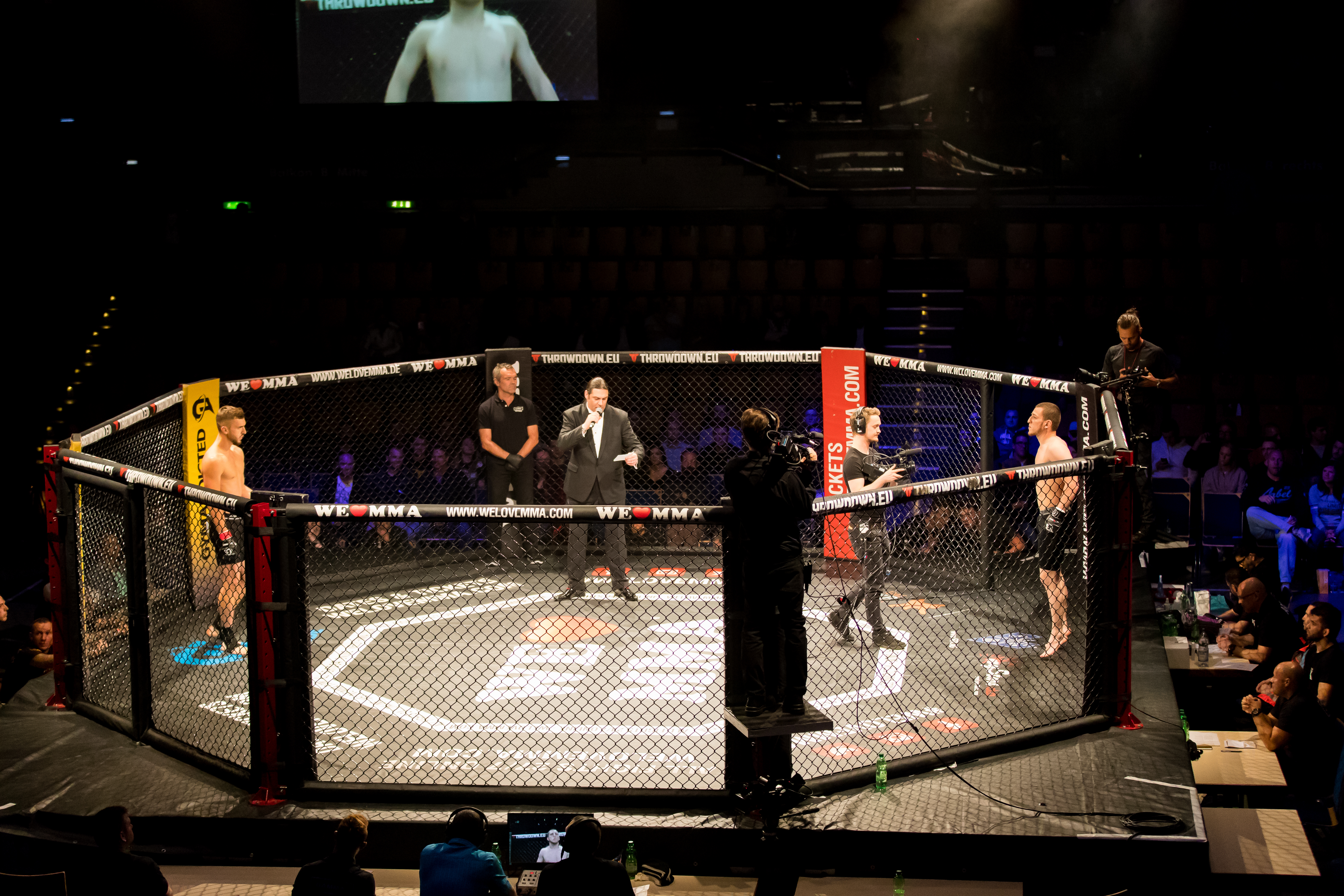
Fighters, referee, and announcer before an MMA fight

== History ==
We Love MMA was founded by Marcus Wortmeier (organizer) and Frank Burczinsky (matchmaker) The event series started in co-operation with the now-defunct German Free Fight Association (FFA). For that reason Sherdog still lists FFA and We Love MMA together in their fight database, counting 63 events and more than 500 matches. The first six We Love MMA events were all held between 2010 and 2013 in Berlin’s Universal Hall. 2014 saw the first events taking place outside Berlin, in Oberhausen, Hamburg, and Stuttgart. After six meetings in Germany in 2015, the series expanded to Austria (Vienna) and Switzerland (Basel) in 2016. Regular venues include arenas in Ludwigshafen, Dresden, Hanover and Munich. In 2019, We Love MMA premiered at the Castello in Dusseldorf and in the Saarlandhalle in Saarbrücken. There have been 48 events so far, with more planned for 2019 and already for 2020.

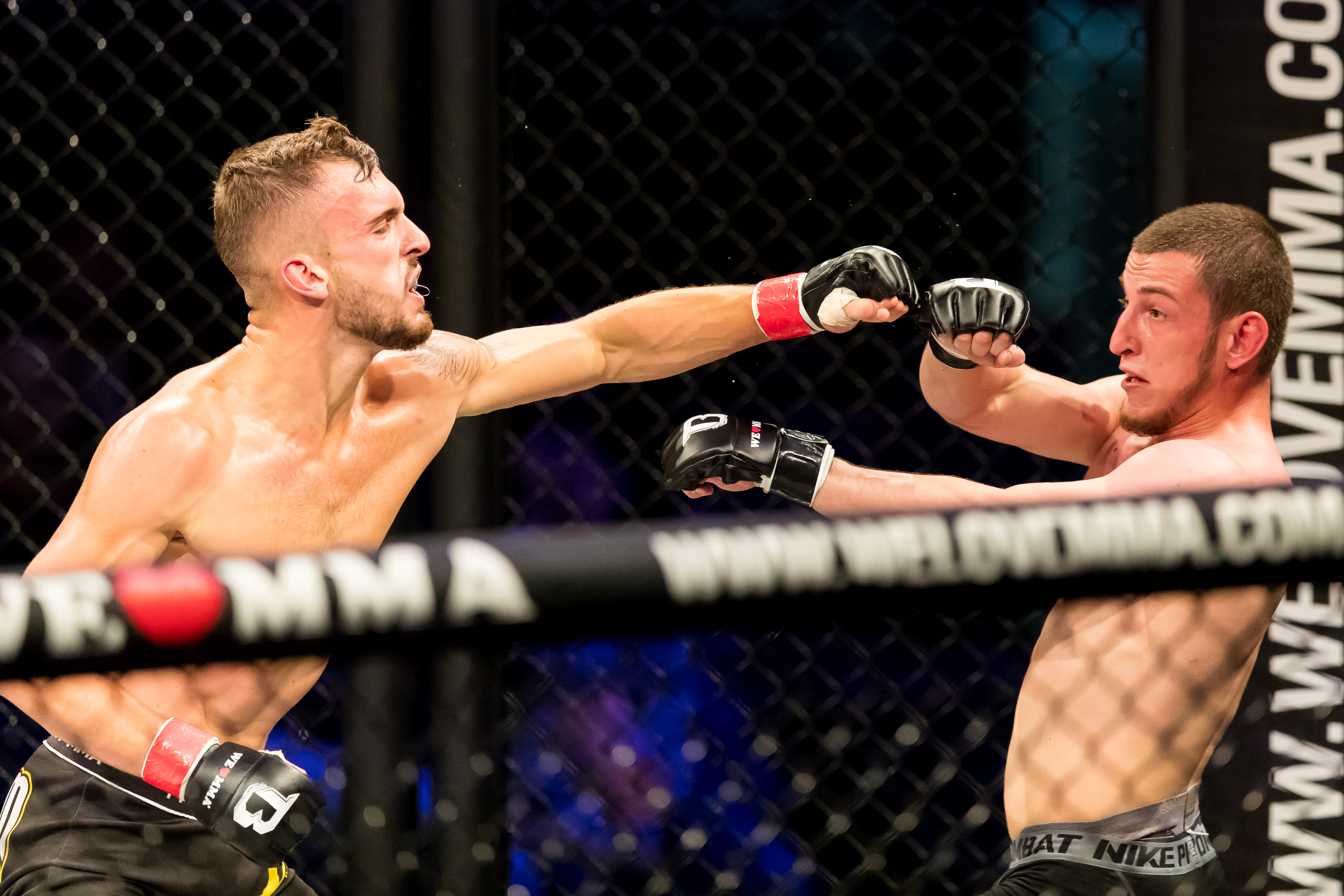
Two fighters during a bout

== Rules and weight divisions ==
We Love MMA events are regulated by the Grappling and Mixed Martial Arts Association e.V. (GAMMA²). The rules are aligned with the Unified Rules of Mixed Martial Arts, which are also used by the Ultimate Fighting Championship (UFC). Fights normally consist of two 5-minute rounds.

The series features both fights between male and female fighters.

The first men's title fight in the middleweight class was between Dustin Stoltzfus and Mario Wittmann, with Dustin Stoltzfus emerging victorious to become the first We Love MMA champion. The current welterweight champion is Adrian Zeitner, while Kam Gairbekov is holding the lightweight title

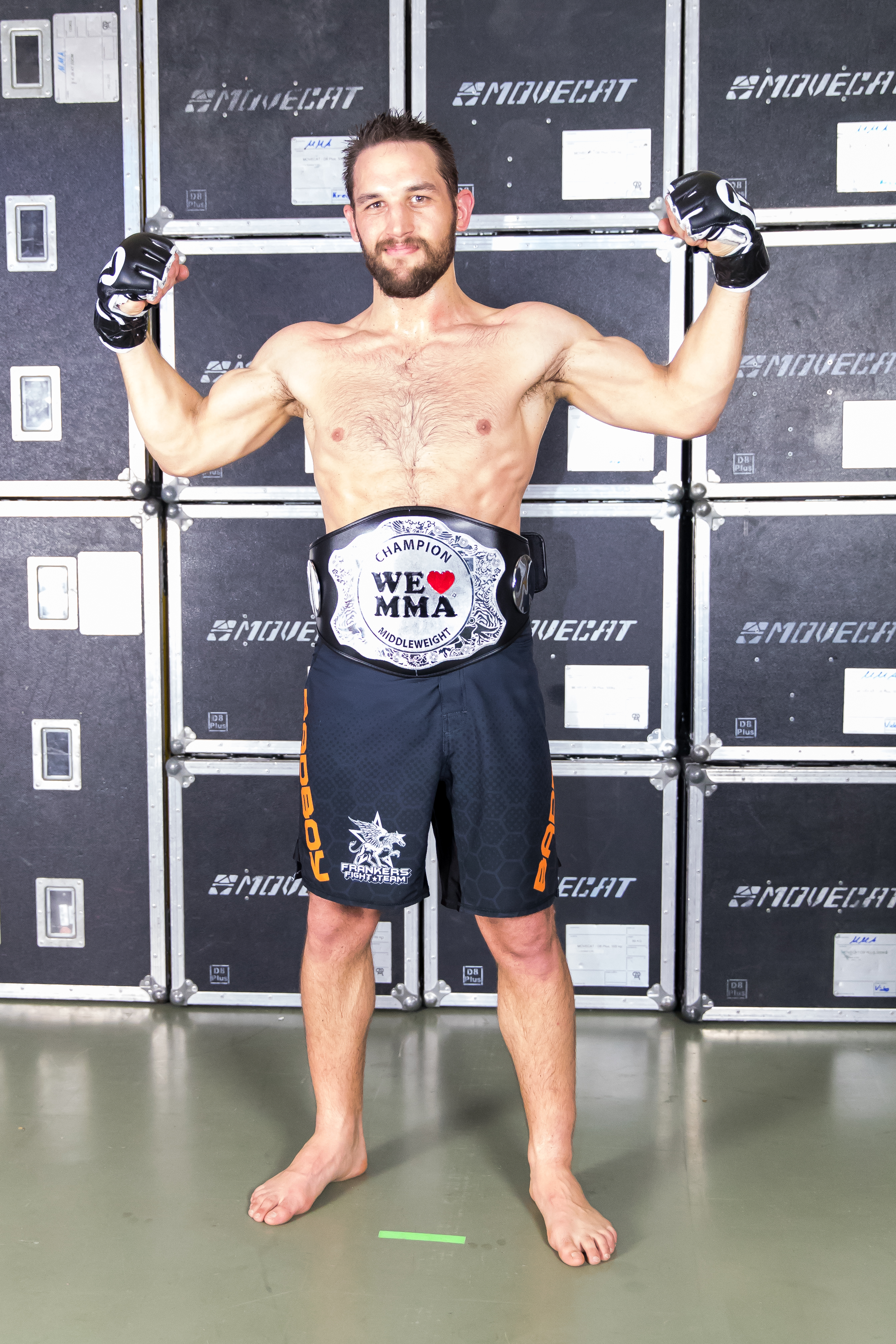
Dustin Stoltzfus wins the middleweight title in Ludwigshafen (April 2017)

== Live stream and archive ==
Since 2017 We Love MMA has provided a live stream with German and English commentators, which is hosted worldwide on various platforms (including German tabloid newspaper Bild's website) and TV channels as well as the We Love MMA website. The archive now contains over 450 videos.
