= UFC Fight Night: Magny vs. Ponzinibbio =

UFC mixed martial arts event in 2018

- The poster for UFC Fight Night: Magny vs. Ponzinibbio
- Promotion: Ultimate Fighting Championship
- Date: November 17, 2018
- Venue: Estadio Mary Terán de Weiss
- City: Buenos Aires, Argentina
- Attendance: 10,245

Event chronology
UFC Fight Night: The Korean Zombie vs. Rodríguez	UFC Fight Night: Magny vs. Ponzinibbio	UFC Fight Night: Blaydes vs. Ngannou 2

UFC Fight Night: Magny vs. Ponzinibbio (also known as UFC Fight Night 140) was a mixed martial arts event produced by the Ultimate Fighting Championship that was held on November 17, 2018 at Estadio Mary Terán de Weiss in Buenos Aires, Argentina.

== Background ==
The event marked the promotion's first visit to Argentina, the 22nd country.

A welterweight bout between Neil Magny and Santiago Ponzinibbio headlined the event.

Veronica Macedo was expected to face Maryna Moroz at the event. However, Macedo pulled out of the fight due to an injury and was replaced by KSW Women's Flyweight Champion and promotional newcomer Ariane Lipski. In turn, Moroz pulled out due to injury on October 30 and as a result the bout was cancelled.

Claudio Puelles was scheduled to face Devin Powell at the event. However, Puelles pulled out of the bout in mid-October with an undisclosed injury and was replaced by promotional newcomer Jesus Pinedo.

A middleweight bout between Jared Cannonier and Alessio Di Chirico was scheduled to the event. However, on October 20, it was reported that Cannonier would meet former WSOF Middleweight and Light Heavyweight Champion David Branch at UFC 230 instead. Initially, it was not sure if a replacement will be sought from the UFC. Ultimately, Di Chirico was pulled from the card.

The Ultimate Fighter: Latin America 2 lightweight winner Enrique Barzola was expected to face Nad Narimani at the event. However, on October 26, it was reported that Barzola pulled out of the bout due to an arm injury and was replaced by promotional newcomer Sergio Giglio. In turn on November 8, it was reported that Giglio was forced out due to injury and was replaced by fellow newcomer Anderson dos Santos.

Tom Breese was expected to face The Ultimate Fighter: Brazil middleweight winner Cezar Ferreira at the event. However, on November 9, it was announced that he pulled out of the event due to injury and was replaced by promotional newcomer Ian Heinisch.

At the weigh-ins, Cynthia Calvillo weighed in at 118 lb, 2 pounds over the strawweight non-title fight limit of 116 lb. She was fined 20 percent of her purse, which went to her opponent Poliana Botelho and the bout proceeded at catchweight.

== Results ==
Main Card (Fox Sports 1)
Weight class				Method	Round	Time	Notes
Welterweight	Santiago Ponzinibbio	def.	Neil Magny	KO (punch)	4	2:36
Featherweight	Ricardo Lamas	def.	Darren Elkins	TKO (elbows and punches)	3	4:09
Light Heavyweight	Johnny Walker	def.	Khalil Rountree Jr.	KO (elbow)	1	1:57
Middleweight	Ian Heinisch	def.	Cezar Ferreira	Decision (unanimous) (30–27, 29–28, 29–28)	3	5:00
Bantamweight	Marlon Vera	def.	Guido Cannetti	Submission (rear-naked choke)	2	1:31
Catchweight (118 lb)	Cynthia Calvillo	def.	Poliana Botelho	Submission (rear-naked choke)	1	4:48
Preliminary Card (Fox Sports 1)
Welterweight	Michel Prazeres	def.	Bartosz Fabiński	Submission (guillotine choke)	1	1:02
Flyweight	Alexandre Pantoja	def.	Ulka Sasaki	Submission (rear-naked choke)	1	2:18
Featherweight	Austin Arnett	def.	Humberto Bandenay	Decision (unanimous) (29–28, 29–27, 29–27)	3	5:00
Welterweight	Laureano Staropoli	def.	Hector Aldana	Decision (unanimous) (30–27, 30–27, 30–27)	3	5:00
Early Preliminary Card (UFC Fight Pass)
Lightweight	Jesus Pinedo	def.	Devin Powell	Decision (unanimous) (29–28, 30–27, 30–27)	3	5:00
Featherweight	Nad Narimani	def.	Anderson dos Santos	Decision (unanimous) (30–27, 30–27, 30–27)	3	5:00

== Bonus awards ==
The following fighters were awarded $50,000 bonuses:

- Fight of the Night: Laureano Staropoli vs. Hector Aldana
- Performance of the Night: Santiago Ponzinibbio and Johnny Walker

== See also ==
- List of UFC events
- 2018 in UFC
- List of current UFC fighters
