= Devin Powell =

American mixed martial arts fighter

- Born: Devin Powell; March 1, 1988 (age 38); Somersworth, New Hampshire, United States
- Height: 6 ft 0 in (183 cm)
- Weight: 155 lb (70 kg; 11 st 1 lb)
- Division: Lightweight
- Reach: 74 in (188 cm)
- Fighting out of: South Berwick, Maine, United States
- Team: Seacoast BJJ and MMA (formerly); The Shop MMA (until 2014); Port City BJJ; Nostos MMA (2014–present)
- Rank: 1st degree black belt in Brazilian Jiu-Jitsu under Jay Mansfield and James Deluca
- Years active: 2010–2020

Mixed martial arts record
- Total: 15
- Wins: 10
- By knockout: 3
- By submission: 4
- By decision: 3
- Losses: 5
- By decision: 5

Other information
- Mixed martial arts record from Sherdog

Devin Powell (born March 1, 1988) is an American retired mixed martial arts fighter who competed in the Lightweight division of the Ultimate Fighting Championship and Bellator MMA.

== Background ==
A once-aspiring professional guitarist who played in a rock band in his teens, Powell graduated from Marshwood High School in South Berwick in 2006. He attended college for a year before dropping out, and taking a clerical job at the National Passport Center in Portsmouth, New Hampshire. Seeking a creative outlet, Powell began attending an MMA gym in town and started participating in jiu-jitsu tournaments, where he found some success.

== Mixed martial arts career ==
=== Early career ===
Powell had his first amateur fight in 2010, losing by split decision. In a little over a year, Powell won his next three amateur fights. When he fought his first professional bout in 2012, he was ranked #1 among amateur lightweight MMA fighters in the Northeastern United States.

In May 2014, Powell took over The Shop MMA academy in Somersworth, New Hampshire when its owners decided to call it quits. Powell revamped the facility, founding Nostos MMA, a small family-friendly MMA gym which is owned by Powell and managed by his wife Carol Linn Hawkins.

In 2016, Powell went on a rapid win streak of four wins in six months. In February, he defeated Jeff Anderson by unanimous decision at Combat Zone 57. In April, despite hurting his back during the fight, Powell finished Jesse Erickson by first-round TKO to win the New England Fights professional lightweight championship. In June, he debuted on World Series of Fighting, winning a split decision over Tom Marcellino.

While taking a break from training and spending some time recuperating from lingering injuries in the days after a winning the Marcellino fight, Powell was asked in mid-July to step in on short notice to fight in New England Fights' upcoming event Dana White: Looking for a Fight on August 6 in Bangor, Maine. UFC president Dana White would be attending this event, scouting talent to sign to his promotion. The event would also be filmed and promoted through White's reality web series of the same name. Powell, the reigning NEF MMA Professional Lightweight Champion, agreed to rematch Jon Lemke in a three-round non-title fight at a catchweight of 160 pounds.

At Looking for a Fight, Powell pressed the action for most of the fight, using kicks to keep Lemke at range. Despite getting caught with a punch at one point that resulted in a visibly broken nose, Powell continued to press the action. Powell dropped Lemke with an uppercut and immediately took his back for a rear naked choke submission in the first round. During the fight, Powell tore his LCL.

=== Ultimate Fighting Championship ===
A few days after his performance in Bangor, Powell was signed to a non-guaranteed four-fight contract with the UFC. In November he was booked to fight at UFC Fight Night: Rodríguez vs. Penn on January 15, 2017. Powell's original opponent was Jordan Rinaldi, but Rinaldi pulled out just before Christmas due to an injury. The UFC quickly signed newcomer Drakkar Klose to his own four-fight contract to replace Rinaldi on short notice. In their fight, Klose defeated Powell decisively, with all three judges scoring the fight 30-27 for Klose.

Powell faced Darrell Horcher on June 25, 2017 at UFC Fight Night 112. He lost the fight via split decision.

Powell faced Álvaro Herrera on July 28, 2018 at UFC on Fox 30. He won the fight via knockout due to kicks to the body in the first round.

Powell was expected to face Claudio Puelles on November 17, 2018 at UFC Fight Night 140. However, it was reported that Puelles pulled out from the event due to injury and he was replaced by newcomer Jesus Pinedo. He lost the fight via unanimous decision and was subsequently released from the promotion.

=== Bellator MMA ===
Powell made his debut for Bellator MMA at Bellator 232 on October 26, 2019, against Marcus Surin. He won the fight by technical submission after his opponent appeared to be unconscious at the end of the second round.

He made his sophomore appearance against Manny Muro at Bellator 252 on November 12, 2020. He lost the fight via unanimous decision and subsequently retired after the loss.

== Personal life ==
Powell has a daughter, Clementine Carol linn Powells step daughter (born 2012).

== Mixed martial arts record ==
Professional record breakdown
15 matches	10 wins	5 losses
By knockout	3	0
By submission	4	0
By decision	3	5

Res.	Record	Opponent	Method	Event	Date	Round	Time	Location	Notes
Loss	10–5	Manny Muro	Decision (unanimous)	Bellator 252	November 12, 2020	3	5:00	Uncasville, Connecticut, United States	
Win	10–4	Marcus Surin	Technical Submission (mounted guillotine)	Bellator 232	October 26, 2019	2	5:00	Uncasville, Connecticut, United States	
Loss	9–4	Jesus Pinedo	Decision (unanimous)	UFC Fight Night: Magny vs. Ponzinibbio	November 17, 2018	3	5:00	Buenos Aires, Argentina	
Win	9–3	Álvaro Herrera	TKO (body kicks and punches)	UFC on Fox: Alvarez vs. Poirier 2	July 28, 2018	1	1:52	Calgary, Alberta, Canada	
Loss	8–3	Darrell Horcher	Decision (split)	UFC Fight Night: Chiesa vs. Lee	June 25, 2017	3	5:00	Oklahoma City, Oklahoma, United States	
Loss	8–2	Drakkar Klose	Decision (unanimous)	UFC Fight Night: Rodríguez vs. Penn	January 15, 2017	3	5:00	Phoenix, Arizona, United States	
Win	8–1	Jonathan Lemke	Submission (rear-naked choke)	NEF: Lookin' for a Fight	August 5, 2016	1	3:50	Bangor, Maine, United States	Catchweight (160 lbs) bout.
Win	7–1	Tom Marcellino	Decision (split)	WSOF 31	June 17, 2016	3	5:00	Mashantucket, Connecticut, United States	
Win	6–1	Jesse Erickson	TKO (punches)	NEF 22: All Roads Lead Here	April 23, 2016	1	4:00	Lewiston, Maine, United States	Won the vacant NEF MMA Professional Lightweight Championship.
Win	5–1	Jeff Anderson	Decision (unanimous)	CZ 57: Clash of the Titans	February 5, 2016	3	5:00	Salem, New Hampshire, United States	
Win	4–1	Scott Jurgen	TKO (elbows)	T2T: Toe 2 Toe Fights 2	May 9, 2015	1	1:40	Portland, Maine, United States	
Win	3–1	Jonathan Lemke	Submission (guillotine choke)	NEF: Fight Night 13	May 10, 2014	1	0:24	Lewiston, Maine, United States	
Loss	2–1	Bruce Boyington	Decision (unanimous)	Coliseum To The Cage: Ruckus	December 6, 2013	3	5:00	Derry, New Hampshire, United States	
Win	2–0	Andy Robertson	Technical Submission (triangle choke)	Cage Titans 9: Live Free and Fight Hard	July 21, 2012	1	0:37	Dover, New Hampshire, United States	
Win	1–0	Anthony Loycano	Decision (unanimous)	CZ 41: Cage Rage at The Rock	April 27, 2012	3	5:00	Salem, New Hampshire, United States	Lightweight debut.
