= Laureano Staropoli =

Argentinian mixed martial arts fighter

- Born: 27 February 1993 (age 33); La Plata, Buenos Aires, Argentina
- Other names: El Matador
- Height: 6 ft 1 in (1.85 m)
- Weight: 171 lb (78 kg; 12 st 3 lb)
- Division: Middleweight; Welterweight
- Reach: 71 1/2 in (182 cm)
- Fighting out of: La Plata, Argentina
- Team: Chute Boxe Diego Lima (2018–present)
- Years active: 2013–present

Mixed martial arts record
- Total: 22
- Wins: 15
- By knockout: 9
- By submission: 2
- By decision: 4
- Losses: 7
- By knockout: 1
- By submission: 1
- By decision: 5

Other information
- Mixed martial arts record from Sherdog

Laureano Staropoli (born 27 February 1993) is an Argentine mixed martial artist (MMA) who currently competes in the Welterweight division. He has previously competed for the Ultimate Fighting Championship (UFC).

== Background ==
Staropoli begun training Taekwondo at the age of eight. After seeing Randy Couture fight, he started training mixed martial arts at the age of 17.

== Mixed martial arts career ==
=== Early career ===
Staropoli started his professional MMA career in 2013 and fought mainly in South America. He amassed a record of 7-1 prior joining UFC.

=== Ultimate Fighting Championship ===
Staropoli made his UFC debut on 17 November 2018 at UFC Fight Night: Magny vs. Ponzinibbio against Hector Aldana. He won the fight via unanimous decision.

Staropoli faced Thiago Alves at UFC 237 on 11 May 2019. He won the fight via unanimous decision.

Staropoli was scheduled to face Alexey Kunchenko on 10 August 2019 in Montevideo, Uruguay. However, it was announced on 29 July 2019 that Staropoli was forced to pull out of the fight due to a broken nose and was replaced by Gilbert Burns. Kunchenko lost the fight via unanimous decision.

Staropoli faced Muslim Salikhov on 26 October 2019 at UFC on ESPN+ 20. He lost the fight via unanimous decision.

Staropoli faced Tim Means on 8 August 2020 at UFC Fight Night 174. At the weigh-ins, Staropoli weighed in at 174.5 pounds, three and a half pounds over the welterweight non-title fight limit. The bout proceeded at a catchweight and Stropoli was fined 20% of his purse, which went to Means. He lost the fight via unanimous decision.

Laureano, replacing injured Alessio Di Chirico, faced Roman Dolidze on 5 June 2021 at UFC Fight Night: Rozenstruik vs. Sakai. He lost the bout via unanimous decision.

Laureano was scheduled to face Jamie Pickett on 9 October 2021 at UFC Fight Night: Dern vs. Rodriguez. However, after one of Pickett's coaches tested positive for COVID-19, the bout was moved to 23 October at UFC Fight Night: Costa vs. Vettori. Laureano lost the fight via unanimous decision.

On 2 November 2021, it was announced that Staropoli was no longer on the UFC roster.

=== Post UFC ===
Laureano made his first appearance post-UFC release on 16 April 2022 at Ares FC 5 against Carl Booth. He won the bout via unanimous decision.

Laureano faced Leonardo Damiani on 3 November 2022 at Ares FC 9, winning the bout via unanimous decision.

Laureano faced Mickaël Lebout on April. 7, 2023 at Ares FC 14, winning the bout via knockout in round two and becoming the AFC Interim Welterweight Champion.

=== Professional Fighters League ===
Staropoli made his PFL debut against Baba Boundjoi Nadjombe at PFL Europe 3 on 30 September 2023, defeating him via corner stoppage after the 2nd round.

Staropoli faced Murad Ramazanov on 19 April 2024 at PFL 3 (2024). At weigh-ins, Staropoli came in at 175.2 lbs, 4.2 pounds over the limit for welterweight. He was fined 20% of his purse and given a point deduction in the standings. He lost the fight via a rear-naked choke submission in the first round.

Staropoli was expected to face former interim Bellator Welterweight Champion Logan Storley on 28 June 2024 at PFL 6, but he withdrew for unknown reasons.

== Personal life ==
Staropoli was a police officer before being signed by UFC.

== Championships and accomplishments ==
- Ultimate Fighting Championship
  - Fight of the Night (One Time) vs. Hector Aldana

== Mixed martial arts record ==
Professional record breakdown
22 matches	15 wins	7 losses
By knockout	9	1
By submission	2	1
By decision	4	5

Res.	Record	Opponent	Method	Event	Date	Round	Time	Location	Notes
Win	15–7	Jakub Bahník	KO (spinning back elbow)	FNC 32	20 June 2026	2	2:15	Osijek, Croatia	Knockout of the Night. Fight of the Night.
Win	14–7	Wahed Nazhand	KO (spinning wheel kick)	FNC 30	9 May 2026	1	1:56	Zadar, Croatia	Knockout of the Night.
Loss	13–7	Abdoul Abdouraguimov	Decision (unanimous)	PFL Europe 4 (2024)	14 December 2024	3	5:00	Décines-Charpieu, France	
Loss	13–6	Murad Ramazanov	Submission (rear-naked choke)	PFL 3 (2024)	19 April 2024	1	4:06	Chicago, Illinois, United States	Catchweight (175.2 lb) bout; Staropoli missed weight.
Win	13–5	Baba Boundjou Nadjombe	TKO (corner stoppage)	PFL Europe 3 (2023)	30 September 2023	2	5:00	Paris, France	Catchweight (180 lb) bout.
Win	12–5	Mickaël Lebout	KO (punches)	Ares FC 14	7 April 2023	2	0:43	Paris, France	Won the interim Ares FC Welterweight Championship. Performance of the Night. Fight of the Night.
Win	11–5	Leonardo Damiani	Decision (unanimous)	Ares FC 9	3 November 2022	3	5:00	Paris, France	Fight of the Night.
Win	10–5	Carl Booth	Decision (unanimous)	Ares FC 5	16 April 2022	3	5:00	Paris, France	Return to Welterweight. Performance of the Night.
Loss	9–5	Jamie Pickett	Decision (unanimous)	UFC Fight Night: Costa vs. Vettori	23 October 2021	3	5:00	Las Vegas, Nevada, United States	
Loss	9–4	Roman Dolidze	Decision (unanimous)	UFC Fight Night: Rozenstruik vs. Sakai	5 June 2021	3	5:00	Las Vegas, Nevada, United States	Return to Middleweight.
Loss	9–3	Tim Means	Decision (unanimous)	UFC Fight Night: Lewis vs. Oleinik	8 August 2020	3	5:00	Las Vegas, Nevada, United States	Catchweight (174.5 lb) bout; Staropoli missed weight.
Loss	9–2	Muslim Salikhov	Decision (unanimous)	UFC Fight Night: Maia vs. Askren	26 October 2019	3	5:00	Kallang, Singapore	
Win	9–1	Thiago Alves	Decision (unanimous)	UFC 237	11 May 2019	3	5:00	Rio de Janeiro, Brazil	
Win	8–1	Hector Aldana	Decision (unanimous)	UFC Fight Night: Magny vs. Ponzinibbio	17 November 2018	3	5:00	Buenos Aires, Argentina	Fight of the Night.
Win	7–1	Carlos Alberto Bazan Rojas	TKO (punches)	Combate Cotas MMA 3	10 June 2017	2	3:00	Santa Cruz de la Sierra, Bolivia	
Win	6–1	Sebastian Delgadillo	TKO (punches)	Combate Cotas MMA 2	11 June 2016	1	3:45	Santa Cruz de la Sierra, Bolivia	Return to Welterweight.
Win	5–1	Sebastian Muñoz	KO (punches)	Espartaco MMA 2	21 October 2015	1	3:30	Buenos Aires, Argentina	
Win	4–1	Sebastian Muñoz	Submission (kimura)	Ultimatum MMA: 2K9 Unlimited	20 September 2015	2	3:00	Buenos Aires, Argentina	
Win	3–1	Ezequiel Miranda	TKO (punches)	Punishers 5	17 May 2015	1	1:00	Buenos Aires, Argentina	Return to Middleweight.
Loss	2–1	Alejandro Ezequiel Coslovsky	TKO (punches)	Punishers 4	21 September 2013	1	3:48	Buenos Aires, Argentina	Welterweight debut.
Win	2–0	Adrian Mazza Miranda	TKO (punches)	La Plata Fight Club	17 August 2013	1	0:48	Buenos Aires, Argentina	
Win	1–0	William Castro	Submission (armbar)	Tavares Combat 7	27 July 2013	2	4:16	Buenos Aires, Argentina	Middleweight debut.

== See also ==
- List of male mixed martial artists
