= Humberto Bandenay =

Peruvian MMA fighter

- Born: September 4, 1994 (age 32); Lima, Peru
- Height: 5 ft 11 in (1.80 m)
- Weight: 145 lb (66 kg; 10 st 5 lb)
- Division: Featherweight
- Reach: 71.5 in (182 cm)
- Fighting out of: Lima, Peru
- Team: Dogo Training Center
- Years active: 2013–present

Mixed martial arts record
- Total: 39
- Wins: 27
- By knockout: 9
- By submission: 12
- By decision: 6
- Losses: 10
- By knockout: 3
- By submission: 4
- By decision: 3
- No contests: 2

Amateur record
- Total: 1
- Wins: 1

Other information
- Mixed martial arts record from Sherdog

Humberto Bandenay (born September 4, 1994) is a Peruvian mixed martial artist (MMA) who is best known for competing in the Featherweight division in the UFC.

== Mixed martial arts career ==
=== Early career ===
Bandenay started his professional MMA career in 2012 and amassed a record of 13–4 before signing with the UFC.

=== Ultimate Fighting Championship ===
Bandenay made his UFC debut on August 5, 2017, against Martín Bravo at UFC Fight Night: Pettis vs. Moreno. He won the fight via knockout in round one. This win earned him the Performance of the Night award.

Bandenay was scheduled to face Steven Peterson on February 18, 2018, at UFC Fight Night 126. However, due to visa issues, Bandenay was pulled from the bout and replaced by Brandon Davis.

On May 19, 2018, Bandenay faced Gabriel Benítez at UFC Fight Night: Maia vs. Usman. He lost the fight via knockout in round one.

Bandenay faced Austin Arnett on November 17, 2018, at UFC Fight Night 140. He lost the fight via unanimous decision.

Bandenay faced Luiz Eduardo Garagorri on August 10, 2019, at UFC on ESPN+ 14. He lost the fight via unanimous decision. Bandenay was released by the UFC in October 2019.

=== Post-UFC career ===
After his release from the UFC, Bandenay returned to the Fusion FC. He faced Bruno Conti at Fusion FC 41 on November 13, 2019, winning the bout via technical knockout in the second round.

==== Copa Combate 2019 ====
On December 16, 2019, news surfaced that Bandenay would be joining Combate Americas' eight-man lightweight tournament that took place on December 20, 2019. In the quarterfinals, Bandenay faced Hugo Prada in a one-round bout. Bandenay won the fight via unanimous decision and advanced to the semifinals.

In the semifinals, Bandenay faced Jose Luis Verdugo. Bandenay knocked Verdugo down in the second round and finished the bout via technical knockout by way of ground-and-pound, advancing to the final.

In the final Bandenay faced Erick Gonzalez. Bandenay won the back-and-forth fight via unanimous decision, claiming the Copa Combate tournament prize of $100,000.

==== Title shot ====
The Copa Combate tournament win aligned Bandenay to challenge Rafa García for the Combate Americas' Lightweight title. The bout took place on February 21, 2020. Bandenay lost the fight via unanimous decision.

=== Professional Fighters League ===
Bandenay made his PFL debut against Kim Sang-won on May 2, 2026, at PFL Sioux Falls. He lost the fight via technical knockout in round two.

== Mixed martial arts record ==
Professional record breakdown
39 matches	27 wins	10 losses
By knockout	9	3
By submission	12	4
By decision	6	3
No contests	2	

Res.	Record	Opponent	Method	Event	Date	Round	Time	Location	Notes
Loss	27–10 (1)	Kim Sang-won	TKO (elbows)	PFL Sioux Falls: Storley vs. Zendeli	May 2, 2026	2	2:56	Sioux Falls, South Dakota, United States	
Win	27–9 (1)	Amin Gasimov	TKO (knee to the body and punches)	559 Fights 122	March 8, 2026	3	4:34	Porterville, California, United States	For the vacant 559 Fights Featherweight Championship. Bandenay missed weight (148.6 lb) and was ineligible for the title.
Win	26–9 (1)	Ernie Juarez	TKO (head kick)	Urijah Faber's A1 Combat 30	October 4, 2025	1	2:45	Santa Ynez, California, United States	Return to Featherweight.
Win	25–9 (1)	Erick Sánchez	Technical Submission (triangle choke)	Urijah Faber's A1 Combat 29	August 1, 2025	3	2:30	Wheatland, California, United States	Catchweight (150 lb) bout.
Loss	24–9 (1)	Alvaro Andres Guerrero	TKO (punches)	Fusion FC 85	December 19, 2024	2	4:49	Lima, Peru	For the Fusion FC Lightweight Championship.
Win	24–8 (1)	Ronaldo Nogueira	Submission (rear-naked choke)	Fusion FC 80	August 28, 2024	1	4:06	Lima, Peru	
Win	23–8 (1)	Naif Tadeu Correa Jr.	TKO (punches)	Fusion FC 76	May 23, 2024	2	3:55	Lima, Peru	
NC	21–8 (2)	Luann Sardinha	NC (illegal elbow)	Fusion FC 72	February 22, 2024	1	5:00	Lima, Peru	Featherweight bout. Accidental illegal elbow rendered Bandenay unable to continue.
Win	21–8 (1)	Welinton Benvenutti	Submission (triangle choke)	Fusion FC 70	November 14, 2023	1	3:53	Lima, Peru	
Win	20–8 (1)	Sebastian Piedrahita	Submission (rear-naked choke)	Naciones MMA 8	July 22, 2022	3	1:00	Bogotá, Colombia	
Win	20–8 (1)	Daniel Luigy Bastidas	Submission (rear-naked choke)	WCC 05	April 22, 2022	2	2:07	Lima, Peru	
Win	19–8 (1)	Lian Pantaleon	Decision (unanimous)	WCC 04	February 18, 2022	3	5:00	Chiclayo, Peru	Won the vacant WCC Featherweight Championship.
Loss	18–8 (1)	Rafa García	Decision (unanimous)	Combate 55: Mexicali	February 21, 2020	3	5:00	Mexicali, Mexico	For the Combate Americas Lightweight Championship.
Win	18–7 (1)	Erick Gonzalez	Decision (unanimous)	Combate 53: Copa Combate 2019	December 20, 2019	3	5:00	Lima, Peru	Won the 2019 Copa Combate Lightweight Tournament.
Win	17–7 (1)	Jose Luis Verdugo	TKO (punches)	Combate 53: Copa Combate 2019	December 20, 2019	2	1:14	Lima, Peru	2019 Copa Combate Lightweight Tournament Semifinal.
Win	16–7 (1)	Hugo Hernando Prada	Decision (unanimous)	Combate 53: Copa Combate 2019	December 20, 2019	1	5:00	Lima, Peru	2019 Copa Combate Lightweight Tournament Quarterfinal.
Win	15–7 (1)	Bruno Conti	TKO (punches)	Fusion FC 41	November 13, 2019	2	3:59	Lima, Peru	Lightweight debut.
Loss	14–7 (1)	Luiz Eduardo Garagorri	Decision (unanimous)	UFC Fight Night: Shevchenko vs. Carmouche 2	August 10, 2019	3	5:00	Montevideo, Uruguay	
Loss	14–6 (1)	Austin Arnett	Decision (unanimous)	UFC Fight Night: Magny vs. Ponzinibbio	November 17, 2018	3	5:00	Buenos Aires, Argentina	
Loss	14–5 (1)	Gabriel Benítez	KO (slam)	UFC Fight Night: Maia vs. Usman	May 19, 2018	1	0:39	Santiago, Chile	
Win	14–4 (1)	Martin Bravo	KO (knee)	UFC Fight Night: Pettis vs. Moreno	August 5, 2017	1	0:25	Mexico City, Mexico	Performance of the Night.
Win	13–4 (1)	Salim Mukhidinov	Submission (armbar)	KOTC: Groundbreaking	May 6, 2017	1	2:40	San Jacinto, California, United States	
Win	12–4 (1)	Vicente Vargas	Submission (rear-naked choke)	Fusion FC 25	February 22, 2017	3	2:40	Lima, Peru	Won the interim Fusion FC Featherweight Championship.
Win	11–4 (1)	Alonso Santos Verona	Submission (armbar)	Redemption Fighters 2	November 24, 2016	1	4:42	Lima, Peru	Won the vacant RDF Featherweight Championship.
Win	10–4 (1)	Henry Moya	TKO (doctor stoppage)	Fusion FC 21	July 20, 2016	2	2:6	Lima, Peru	
Win	9–4 (1)	Sergio Hortig	KO (head kick)	Fusion FC 20	May 4, 2016	2	0:28	Lima, Peru	
Loss	8–4 (1)	Arturo Chavez	Submission (rear-naked choke)	Fusion FC 19	February 26, 2016	2	2:41	Lima, Peru	Lost the Fusion FC Featherweight Championship.
Win	8–3 (1)	Jose Zarauz	TKO (punches)	Fusion FC 18	December 16, 2015	1	2:24	Lima, Peru	Won the Fusion FC Featherweight Championship.
Loss	7–3 (1)	Alonso Santos Verona	Submission (choke)	Fusion FC 16	September 30, 2015	1	4:50	Lima, Peru	For the interim Fusion FC Featherweight Championship.
Win	7–2 (1)	Luis Marlon Gonzales	Decision (split)	Fusion FC 15	July 15, 2015	3	5:00	Lima, Peru	
NC	6–2 (1)	Luis Marlon Gonzales	No Contest	Fusion FC 13	February 25, 2015	3	N/A	Lima, Peru	
Win	6–2	Manuel Meza	Submission (triangle choke)	Trujillo FC 2	November 28, 2014	3	4:24	Trujillo, Peru	
Win	5–2	Alonso Santos Verona	Submission (rear-naked choke)	Fusion FC 11	October 22, 2014	1	NA	Lima, Peru	
Win	4–2	Jesus Pinedo	Decision (split)	Inka FC 26	May 24, 2014	3	5:00	Lima, Peru	
Loss	3–2	Enrique Barzola	Submission (rear-naked choke)	Inka FC 25	April 16, 2014	2	N/A	Lima, Peru	Featherweight debut.
Loss	3–1	Bruno Pereira da Silva	Submission (heel hook)	Inka FC 24	October 23, 2013	1	1:30	Lima, Peru	For the Inka FC Bantamweight Championship.
Win	3–0	Juan Manuel Inurritegui	Decision (unanimous)	Inka FC 22	June 29, 2013	3	5:00	Lima, Peru	
Win	2–0	Luis Chang Guibert	TKO (punches)	300 Sparta 1	April 24, 2013	1	0:00	Lima, Peru	
Win	1–0	Renzo Mendez	Submission (triangle choke)	Inka FC 20	February 27, 2013	1	0:00	Lima, Peru	Bantamweight debut.

== See also ==
- List of male mixed martial artists
