= Darrell Horcher =

American mixed martial artist (born 1987)

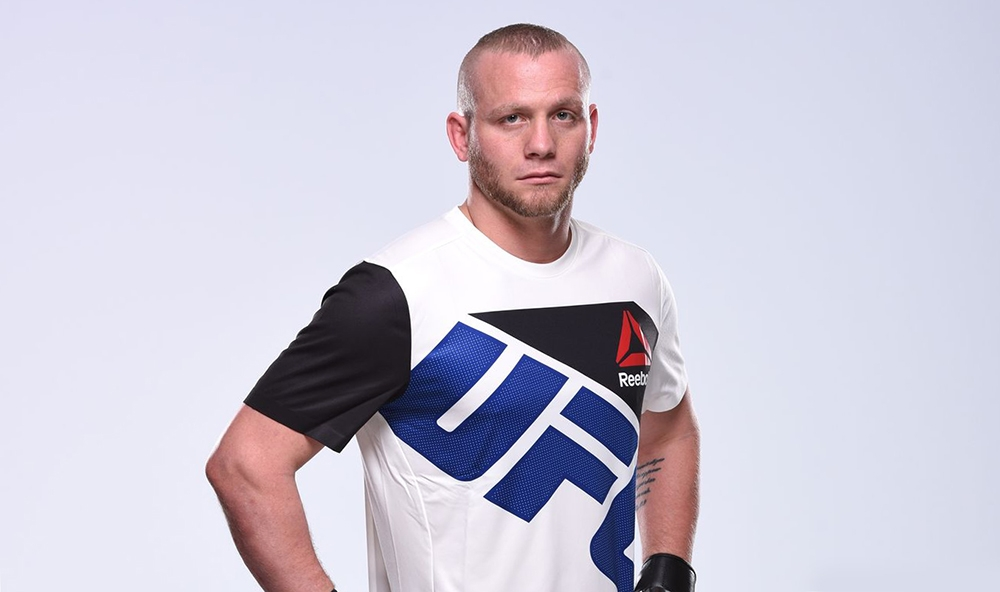
- Horcher in 2016
- Born: Darrell Joseph Horcher; July 28, 1987 (age 39); Chicago, Illinois, U.S.
- Other names: The Saint
- Height: 5 ft 10 in (1.78 m)
- Weight: 155 lb (70 kg; 11.1 st)
- Division: Lightweight
- Reach: 72 in (183 cm)
- Stance: Southpaw
- Fighting out of: Shermans Dale, Pennsylvania, U.S.
- Team: Bulldog MMA
- Rank: Purple belt in Brazilian jiu-jitsu
- Years active: 2010–present

Mixed martial arts record
- Total: 22
- Wins: 14
- By knockout: 7
- By submission: 1
- By decision: 6
- Losses: 8
- By knockout: 4
- By submission: 1
- By decision: 3

Other information
- Mixed martial arts record from Sherdog

Darrell Joseph Horcher (born July 28, 1987) is an American mixed martial artist who competes in the Lightweight division. A professional since 2010, he formerly competed for the UFC, Bellator and the Cage Fury Fighting Championships, where he was the Lightweight Champion.

== Early life and education ==
Born in Chicago and raised in Shermans Dale, Pennsylvania, Horcher began wrestling during his freshman year at West Perry High School, where he graduated in 2005. He later transitioned to mixed martial arts.

== Mixed martial arts career ==
=== Early career ===
Horcher compiled an amateur record of 4–1 before turning professional in September 2010, Horcher fought all of his earlier fights in Pennsylvania-based promotions. With a record of 5–0, he signed with Bellator in 2012.

=== Bellator MMA ===
Horcher made his Bellator debut against then-undefeated E. J. Brooks in a Bellator season seven lightweight tournament reserve bout on October 19, 2012 at Bellator 77. Despite coming in as an underdog, Horcher won the fight via knockout in just 21 seconds into first round.

Horcher then faced Chris Liguori at Bellator 83 on December 7, 2012. Horcher won the fight via unanimous decision.

Horcher was handed his first professional loss via unanimous decision to former TUF 8 contestant Phillipe Nover at Bellator 95.

=== Cage Fury Fighting Championships ===
After his stint in Bellator, Horcher was expected to face Mike Bannon at CFFC 25 on June 22, 2013. However, the bout was cancelled for unknown reasons.

Horcher faced Mike Medrano at CFFC 30: Sterling vs. Roberts on November 2, 2013. He won the fight via unanimous decision.

Horcher faced Gabriel Miglioli at CFFC 35: Heckman vs. Makashvili on April 26, 2014. He won the fight via unanimous decision.

Horcher was expected to face Gil de Freitas at CES 25 on August 8, 2014. However, the fight was cancelled for unknown reasons.

Horcher faced Alex Ricci at CFFC 40: Horcher vs. Ricci on August 23, 2014. He won the fight via unanimous decision.

Horcher faced Jordan Stiner for the vacant CFFC lightweight championship at CFFC 45: Stiner vs. Horcher on February 7, 2015. He won the fight via TKO in the third round.

=== Ultimate Fighting Championship ===
Horcher was tabbed as a short notice replacement to face Khabib Nurmagomedov on April 16, 2016 at UFC on Fox 19. The contest took place at a catchweight of 160 lbs. He lost the fight via second-round TKO.

Horcher faced Devin Powell on June 25, 2017 at UFC Fight Night 112. He won the fight via split decision.

Horcher faced Scott Holtzman on December 9, 2017 at UFC Fight Night 123. He lost the fight by unanimous decision.

Horcher faced promotional newcomer Roosevelt Roberts on November 30, 2018 at The Ultimate Fighter 28 Finale. He lost the fight via a guillotine choke in round one.

Horcher was released by UFC in December 2019.

=== Post UFC ===
After the release, Horcher returned to CFFC and was expected to face Vadim Ogar at CFFC 88 on November 18, 2020. However, the bout was rescheduled to CFFC 90 on December 17, 2020. In turn, the bout was postponed to take place a day later on December 18, 2020 at CFFC 91. Horcher won the fight via first-minute knockout.

Horcher, as a replacement for Natan Schulte, faced Olivier Aubin-Mercier on August 13, 2021 at PFL 7. At weigh-ins, Horcher weighed in at 159.25 pounds, missing weight by 3.25 pounds. The bout proceeded at catchweight and he was fined 20% of his purse, which went to his opponent Aubin-Mercier. Horcher lost the bout via unanimous decision.

Horcher was scheduled to face Akhmed Aliev at Eagle FC 46 on March 11, 2022. The day of the event, the bout was postponed to Eagle FC 47 set for May 20, 2022. Horcher lost the fight via first-minute knockout. He lost the bout via knockout 30 seconds into the bout.

Horcher faced fellow UFC veteran Shane Campbell at Unified MMA 54 for the promotions super lightweight title on December 15, 2023. He lost the fight via second round knockout.

== Championships and accomplishments ==
=== Mixed martial arts ===
- Cage Fury Fighting Championships
  - CFFC Lightweight Championship (one time; former)
    - One successful title defense
- Complete Devastation MMA
  - CDMMA lightweight championship (one time; former)

== Mixed martial arts record ==
Professional record breakdown
22 matches	14 wins	8 losses
By knockout	7	4
By submission	1	1
By decision	6	3

Res.	Record	Opponent	Method	Event	Date	Round	Time	Location	Notes
Loss	14–8	Luis Palomino	TKO (punches and elbows)	Gamebred Bareknuckle MMA 10	May 1, 2026	3	4:44	Miami, Florida, United States	Gamebred FC Lightweight Grand Prix Round of 16.
Loss	14–7	Shane Campbell	KO (head kick and knee)	Unified MMA 54	December 15, 2023	2	2:19	Enoch, Alberta, Canada	For the Unified MMA Super Lightweight Championship.
Loss	14–6	Akhmed Aliev	KO (punches)	Eagle FC 47	May 20, 2022	1	0:30	Miami, Florida, United States	
Loss	14–5	Olivier Aubin-Mercier	Decision (unanimous)	PFL 7 (2021)	August 13, 2021	3	5:00	Hollywood, Florida, United States	Catchweight (159.25 lb) bout; Horcher missed weight.
Win	14–4	Vadim Ogar	TKO (punches)	Cage Fury FC 91	December 18, 2020	1	0:29	Lancaster, Pennsylvania, United States	
Loss	13–4	Roosevelt Roberts	Submission (guillotine choke)	The Ultimate Fighter: Heavy Hitters Finale	November 30, 2018	1	4:50	Las Vegas, Nevada, United States	
Loss	13–3	Scott Holtzman	Decision (unanimous)	UFC Fight Night: Swanson vs. Ortega	December 9, 2017	3	5:00	Fresno, California, United States	
Win	13–2	Devin Powell	Decision (split)	UFC Fight Night: Chiesa vs. Lee	June 25, 2017	3	5:00	Oklahoma City, Oklahoma, United States	
Loss	12–2	Khabib Nurmagomedov	TKO (punches)	UFC on Fox: Teixeira vs. Evans	April 16, 2016	2	3:38	Tampa, Florida, United States	Catchweight (160 lb) bout.
Win	12–1	Stephen Regman	TKO (punches)	Cage Fury FC 52	October 31, 2015	3	3:23	Atlantic City, New Jersey, United States	Defended the Cage Fury FC Lightweight Championship.
Win	11–1	Jordan Stiner	TKO (head kick and punches)	Cage Fury FC 45	February 7, 2015	3	3:45	Atlantic City, New Jersey, United States	Won the vacant Cage Fury FC Lightweight Championship.
Win	10–1	Alex Ricci	Decision (unanimous)	Cage Fury FC 40	August 23, 2014	3	5:00	King of Prussia, Pennsylvania, United States	
Win	9–1	Gabriel Miglioli	Decision (unanimous)	Cage Fury FC 35	April 26, 2014	3	5:00	Atlantic City, New Jersey, United States	
Win	8–1	Mike Medrano	Decision (unanimous)	Cage Fury FC 30	November 2, 2013	3	5:00	King of Prussia, Pennsylvania, United States	
Loss	7–1	Phillipe Nover	Decision (unanimous)	Bellator 95	April 4, 2013	3	5:00	Atlantic City, New Jersey, United States	
Win	7–0	Chris Liguori	Decision (unanimous)	Bellator 83	December 7, 2012	3	5:00	Atlantic City, New Jersey, United States	
Win	6–0	E. J. Brooks	KO (punch)	Bellator 77	October 19, 2012	1	0:21	Reading, Pennsylvania, United States	Bellator Season Seven Lightweight Tournament Reserve bout.
Win	5–0	George Sheppard	KO (punches)	Complete Devastation MMA 5	July 14, 2012	2	2:36	Altoona, Pennsylvania, United States	Won the vacant CDMMA Lightweight Championship.
Win	4–0	Jon Washington	Decision (unanimous)	Pennsylvania FC 6	November 19, 2011	3	5:00	Harrisburg, Pennsylvania, United States	
Win	3–0	Terrell Hobbs	Submission (kimura)	Pennsylvania FC 5	March 25, 2011	2	3:34	Harrisburg, Pennsylvania, United States	
Win	2–0	William Metts	TKO (punches)	PAFC 4	November 20, 2010	1	4:40	Harrisburg, Pennsylvania, United States	
Win	1–0	Steve Franklin	TKO (punches)	Fight Night in the Cage 1	September 10, 2010	1	0:48	Lancaster, Pennsylvania, United States	Lightweight debut.
