= Álvaro Herrera =

Mexican mixed martial arts fighter

- Born: Álvaro Herrera Mendoza; May 14, 1990 (age 36); Guadalajara, Jalisco, Mexico
- Other names: El Chango; Sport Billy
- Height: 6 ft 0 in (1.83 m)
- Weight: 70.5 kg (155 lb; 11 st 1 lb)
- Division: Welterweight; Lightweight
- Reach: 74 in (188 cm)
- Fighting out of: Guadalajara, Jalisco, Mexico
- Team: UAG MMA; Jackson Wink MMA (formerly); Lobo Gym (2020–present)
- Years active: 2008–present

Mixed martial arts record
- Total: 15
- Wins: 9
- By knockout: 5
- By submission: 3
- By decision: 1
- Losses: 6
- By knockout: 3
- By submission: 3

Other information
- Occupation: University student and Professional MMA fighter
- Mixed martial arts record from Sherdog

Álvaro Herrera Mendoza (born May 14, 1990) is a Mexican mixed martial artist competing in the Lightweight division. A professional competitor since 2008, he competed in the Ultimate Fighting Championship and was also a contestant on The Ultimate Fighter: Latin America 2.

== Background ==
Herrera was born in Guadalajara, Jalisco, Mexico. He earned a degree in bio-pharmaceutical chemistry at university. He fought primary in Mexico prior he was selected to be one of the cast members in The Ultimate Fighter: Latin America 2, UFC The Ultimate Fighter TV series, and later signed by UFC.

== Mixed martial arts career ==
=== Early career ===
Herrera began his professional mixed martial arts career in 2008. While on the regional circuit in South America, he competed primarily in his home country of Mexico. He amassed a record of 8–3 prior to trying out for UFC's Latin America developmental program and was accepted into it.

=== The Ultimate Fighter: Latin America 2 ===
After training at Jackson's MMA at UFC's expense, Herrera was selected as one of the cast members for The Ultimate Fighter: Latin America 2, UFC The Ultimate Fighter TV series, under Team Efraín Escudero in April 2015.

In the elimination round, Herrera lost the fight to Hector Aldana by unanimous decision.

=== Ultimate Fighting Championship ===
Herrera made his promotional debut on November 21, 2015, at The Ultimate Fighter Latin America 2 Finale in Monterrey, Nuevo Leon, Mexico. He faced Vernon Ramos and defeated Ramos via KO in round one.

He next faced Vicente Luque on July 7, 2016, at UFC Fight Night: dos Anjos vs. Alvarez. He lost the fight in round two via Brabo choke.

Herrera was expected to face Alex Ricci at UFC Fight Night: Lewis vs. Browne. However, Herrera pulled out of the fight in mid-January citing injury and was replaced by Paul Felder.

Herrera faced Jordan Rinaldi on August 5, 2017, at UFC Fight Night: Pettis vs. Moreno in a lightweight bout. He lost the fight via submission in the first round.

Herrera faced Devin Powell on July 28, 2018, at UFC on Fox 30. He lost the fight via knockout due to kicks to the body in the first round.

=== Post-UFC career ===
After parting ways with the UFC, Herrera signed with Combate Americas and made his promotional debut against Ignacio Capella at Combate 32 on March 8, 2019. He lost the fight via first-round knockout.

== Championships and accomplishments ==
=== Mixed martial arts ===
- Black Fighting Championship'
  - Black Fighting Championship Welterweight Champion (One time) vs. Jorge Campos Negrete
- Black jaguar Fights
  - Black jaguar Fights Welterweight Champion (One time) vs. Gabriel Alamilla

== Personal life ==
Herrera is a student at the university studying bio-pharmaceutical chemistry.

== Mixed martial arts record ==
Professional record breakdown
16 matches	9 wins	7 losses
By knockout	5	4
By submission	3	3
By disqualification	1	0

Res.	Record	Opponent	Method	Event	Date	Round	Time	Location	Notes
Loss	9–7	Ignacio Capella	TKO (punches)	Combate 32: Mexico vs. Spain	March 8, 2019	1	2:59	Guadalajara, Jalisco, Mexico	
Loss	9–6	Devin Powell	TKO (body kicks and punches)	UFC on Fox: Alvarez vs. Poirier 2	July 28, 2018	1	1:52	Calgary, Alberta, Canada	
Loss	9–5	Jordan Rinaldi	Submission (Von Flue choke)	UFC Fight Night: Pettis vs. Moreno	August 5, 2017	1	2:01	Mexico City, Mexico	Lightweight debut.
Loss	9–4	Vicente Luque	Submission (D'Arce choke)	UFC Fight Night: dos Anjos vs. Alvarez	July 7, 2016	2	3:52	Las Vegas, Nevada, United States	
Win	9–3	Vernon Ramos	KO (punches)	The Ultimate Fighter Latin America 2 Finale: Magny vs. Gastelum	November 21, 2015	1	0:30	Monterrey, Mexico	
Win	8–3	Jorge Campos Negrete	Submission (guillotine choke)	Black Fighting Championships 6	August 30, 2012	1	3:15	Jalisco, Mexico	Won the Black Fighting Welterweight Championship.
Loss	7–3	Gabriel Toussaint	TKO (doctor stoppage)	Mazatlan Extreme Fighting	October 15, 2011	2	5:00	Mazatlan, Mexico	
Win	7–2	Gabriel Alamilla	Submission (guillotine choke)	Black Jaguar Fights	September 3, 2011	2	3:20	Cancun, Mexico	Won the Black Jaguar Fights Welterweight Championship.
Win	6–2	Jorge Campos Negrete	TKO (punches)	GEX Cage Tournament: Old Jack's Fight Night - Payback	June 15, 2011	2	2:54	Jalisco, Mexico	
Win	5–2	Elias Diaz	DQ	GEX Cage Tournament: Old Jack's Fight Night VIP 4	September 29, 2010	0	0:00	Jalisco, Mexico	
Loss	4–2	Jimmer Hernandez	KO (punch)	Supreme Kombat Challenge 3	September 3, 2010	1	0:04	Jalisco, Mexico	
Win	4–1	David Gonzalez Guerra	Submission (triangle armbar)	GEX Cage Tournament 5	June 3, 2010	2	1:58	Jalisco, Mexico	
Win	3–1	Álvaro Laguna	KO (punches)	Calle 2 Fight Night	March 28, 2010	1	1:47	Jalisco, Mexico	
Win	2–1	Houston Ortega	KO (punches)	Black Fighting Championships 5	March 19, 2009	1	2:02	Jalisco, Mexico	
Loss	1–1	David Gonzalez Guerra	Submission (rear-naked hoke)	GEX Cage Tournament: Gladiadores Extremos	February 2, 2009	1	2:40	Jalisco, Mexico	
Win	1–0	Houston Ortega	TKO (punches)	Black Fighting Championships 4	November 26, 2008	2	1:16	Jalisco, Mexico	

== See also ==
- List of current UFC fighters
- List of Mexican UFC fighters
- List of male mixed martial artists
