= Bartosz Fabiński =

Polish mixed martial arts fighter

- Born: April 26, 1986 (age 40); Warsaw, Poland
- Other names: The Butcher
- Nationality: Polish
- Height: 6 ft 0 in (1.83 m)
- Weight: 185 lb (84 kg; 13.2 st)
- Division: Welterweight, Middleweight
- Fighting out of: Warsaw, Poland
- Team: Berkut WCA Fight Team
- Trainer: Robert Jocz (MMA); Robert Złotkowski (Kickboxing)
- Rank: Brown belt in Judo under Wojciech Borowiak
- Years active: 2011–present

Mixed martial arts record
- Total: 22
- Wins: 16
- By knockout: 8
- By decision: 8
- Losses: 6
- By knockout: 1
- By submission: 4
- By decision: 1

Other information
- Mixed martial arts record from Sherdog

Bartosz Fabiński (born 26 April 1986) is a Polish mixed martial artist who fights in the Middleweight division of Konfrontacja Sztuk Walki (KSW). He has formerly competed in the Ultimate Fighting Championship (UFC).

== Background ==
Fabiński was born in Warsaw, Poland. He began training in judo when he was seven years old. He took an interest in fighting in 2010 after joining the Nastula Team, the MMA gym of former Olympic gold medalist Paweł Nastula.

== Mixed martial arts career ==
Fabiński made his MMA debut in November 2011 and by 2014 had compiled a record of 11–2 fighting all but one of his fights in Poland, winning the PLMMA Middleweight Champion and Oktagon MMA 4-Man Middleweight Tournament Champion.

=== Ultimate Fighting Championship ===
Fabiński made his promotional debut against Garreth McLellan at UFC Fight Night 64, replacing Krzysztof Jotko who had suffered a broken arm. He won the bout via unanimous decision.

Fabiński was then scheduled to face Hector Urbina at The Ultimate Fighter Latin America 2 Finale. He won the bout via unanimous decision.

Fabiński was expected to face Nicolas Dalby at UFC Fight Night 86, but was removed from the card for undisclosed reasons.

After 2 1/2 years away due to injury, Fabiński was then scheduled to return against Emil Weber Meek at UFC Fight Night 134. Despite getting rocked in the third round, he won the bout via unanimous decision.

Fabiński faced Michel Prazeres at UFC Fight Night 140. He lost the fight via a guillotine choke in the first round.

Fabiński was expected to face promotional newcomer Sergey Khandozhko on June 1, 2019, at UFC Fight Night: Gustafsson vs. Smith, but pulled out due to injury.

Fabiński was scheduled to face Shavkat Rakhmonov on March 21, 2020, at UFC Fight Night: Woodley vs. Edwards. Due to COVID-19 pandemic the bout was moved to Cage Warriors 113 and he was scheduled to face Darren Stewart instead. Fabiński won the fight via unanimous decision.

Fabiński faced André Muniz on September 5, 2020, at UFC Fight Night 176. He lost the fight via an armbar in round one.

Fabiński faced Gerald Meerschaert on April 17, 2021, at UFC on ESPN 22. He lost the fight via technical submission in round one.

After the loss he was released by UFC. Fabiński holds the all-time UFC record for Control Time Percentage with 79.1%.

=== KSW ===
Signing with Konfrontacja Sztuk Walki, Fabiński faced Laïd Zerhouni on January 20, 2024 at KSW 90: Wrzosek vs. Vitasović, getting knocked out in 12 seconds.

== Mixed martial arts record ==
Professional record breakdown
22 matches	16 wins	6 losses
By knockout	8	1
By submission	0	4
By decision	8	1

Res.	Record	Opponent	Method	Event	Date	Round	Time	Location	Notes
Loss	16–6	Laïd Zerhouni	KO (punches)	KSW 90: Wrzosek vs. Vitasović	January 20, 2024	1	0:12	Warsaw, Poland	
Win	16–5	Kacper Karski	Decision (unanimous)	Strife 4	October 7, 2023	3	5:00	Rzeszów, Poland	
Loss	15–5	Gerald Meerschaert	Technical Submission (guillotine choke)	UFC on ESPN: Whittaker vs. Gastelum	April 17, 2021	1	2:00	Las Vegas, Nevada, United States	
Loss	15–4	André Muniz	Submission (armbar)	UFC Fight Night: Overeem vs. Sakai	September 5, 2020	1	2:42	Las Vegas, Nevada, United States	
Win	15–3	Darren Stewart	Decision (unanimous)	Cage Warriors 113	March 20, 2020	3	5:00	Manchester, England	Return to Middleweight.
Loss	14–3	Michel Prazeres	Submission (guillotine choke)	UFC Fight Night: Magny vs. Ponzinibbio	November 17, 2018	1	1:02	Buenos Aires, Argentina	
Win	14–2	Emil Weber Meek	Decision (unanimous)	UFC Fight Night: Shogun vs. Smith	July 22, 2018	3	5:00	Hamburg, Germany	
Win	13–2	Héctor Urbina	Decision (unanimous)	UFC Fight Night: Magny vs. Gastelum	November 21, 2015	3	5:00	Monterrey, Mexico	
Win	12–2	Garreth McLellan	Decision (unanimous)	UFC Fight Night: Gonzaga vs. Cro Cop 2	April 11, 2015	3	5:00	Kraków, Poland	Middleweight bout.
Win	11–2	Alik Tseiko	Decision (split)	MMA Raju 14	October 18, 2014	3	5:00	Tartu, Estonia	Welterweight debut.
Win	10–2	Alexey Repalov	TKO (doctor stoppage)	Fighters Arena 9	Jun 8, 2014	1	1:54	Józefów, Poland	Catchweight (190 lb) bout.
Win	9–2	Gregor Herb	Decision (unanimous)	WAM: Fabiński vs. Herb	May 9, 2014	3	5:00	Warsaw, Poland	
Win	8–2	Michał Szuliński	TKO (elbows)	PLMMA 29: Extra	March 15, 2014	1	4:10	Legionowo, Poland	Won the PLMMA Middleweight Championship.
Loss	7–2	Wendres Carlos da Silva	Decision (unanimous)	Pro MMA Challenge 1: Drwal vs. Heleno	March 1, 2014	3	5:00	Wrocław, Poland	
Win	7–1	Antoni Chmielewski	TKO (doctor stoppage)	PLMMA 26 Extra: Legionowo	December 28, 2013	1	5:00	Legionowo, Poland	
Win	6–1	Dominik Chmiel	TKO (punches)	Gladiator World Fight 2	December 8, 2013	1	0:00	Brodnica, Poland	
Win	5–1	Adam Kowalski	TKO (punches)	BOC (PL): Battle of Champions	October 5, 2013	1	4:21	Zamość, Poland	
Loss	4–1	Marcin Bandel	Submission (heel hook)	FA 4: Chlewicki vs. Nobrega	November 24, 2012	1	1:10	Włocławek, Poland	
Win	4–0	Adam Biega	TKO (corner stoppage)	Oktagon MMA 1	May 26, 2012	1	1:57	Sanok, Poland	
Win	3–0	Bartlomiej Butryn	TKO (punches)	Oktagon MMA 1	May 26, 2012	1	2:18	Sanok, Poland	
Win	2–0	Marcin Mateusz Kurylczyk	Decision (unanimous)	SFT: MMA Fight Night Diva SPA	May 19, 2012	2	5:00	Kołobrzeg, Poland	
Win	1–0	Robert Białoszewski	TKO (punches)	FC: Battle of Warsaw	November 18, 2011	1	0:20	Warsaw, Poland	Middleweight debut.
