= Austin Arnett =

American mixed martial arts fighter

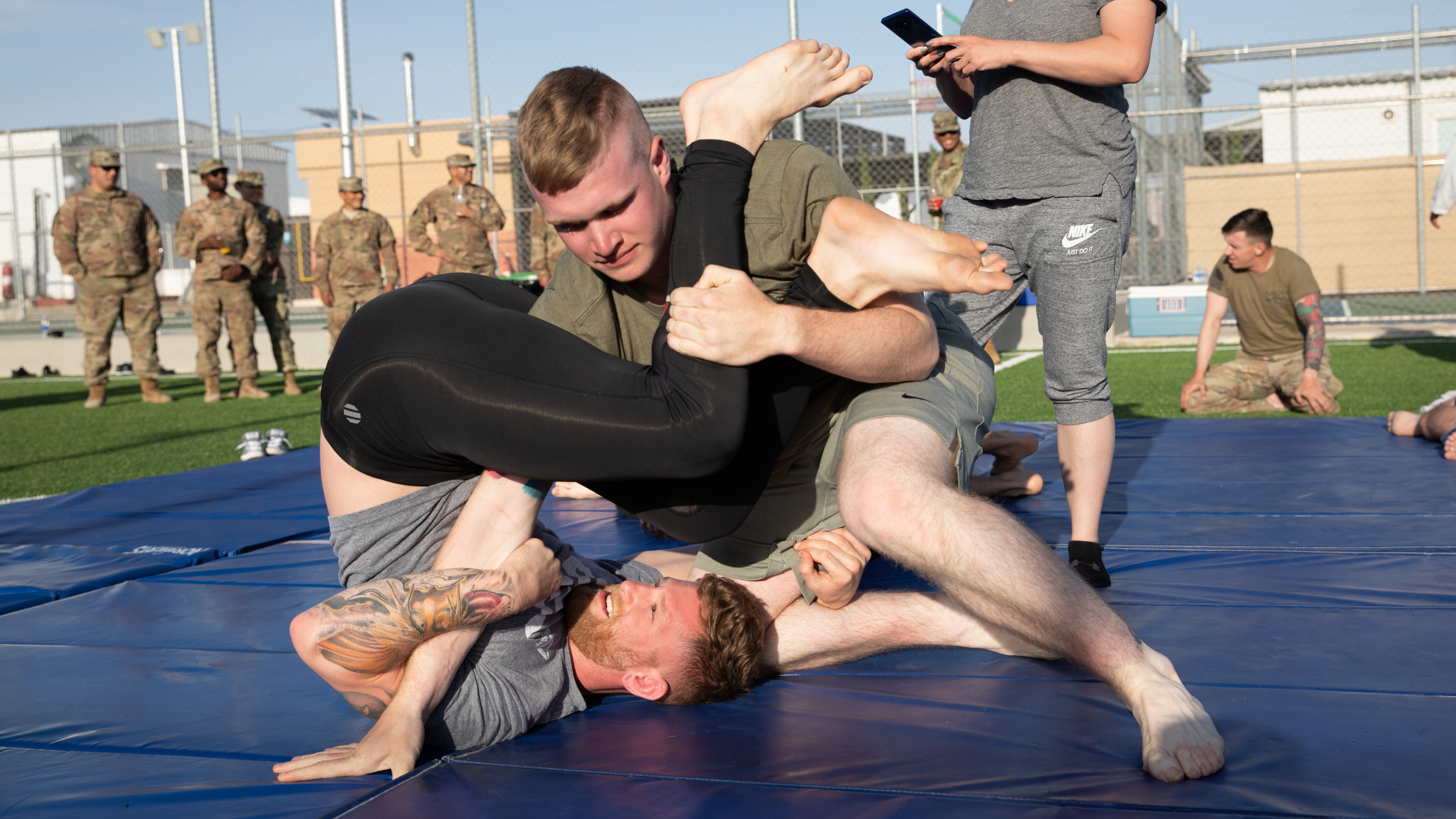
- Arnett (bottom) grapples a National Guardsman at the Joint Training Center in Jordan in 2019
- Born: Austin Marlow Arnett; October 22, 1991 (age 35); Lewiston, Idaho, United States
- Other names: The Golden Boy
- Height: 6 ft 0 in (1.83 m)
- Weight: 145 lb (66 kg; 10 st 5 lb)
- Division: Featherweight; Lightweight
- Reach: 72 in (183 cm)
- Fighting out of: Clarkston, Washington United States
- Team: Martial Arts America and Sik-Jitsu Fighting Systems
- Trainer: Striking - Frank Arnett and Rick Little
- Years active: 2012–present

Professional boxing record
- Total: 1
- Wins: 1
- By knockout: 1
- Losses: 0

Mixed martial arts record
- Total: 26
- Wins: 19
- By knockout: 8
- By submission: 7
- By decision: 4
- Losses: 7
- By knockout: 1
- By submission: 1
- By decision: 5

Other information
- Boxing record from BoxRec
- Mixed martial arts record from Sherdog

Austin Marlow Arnett (born October 22, 1991) is a mixed martial artist (MMA) who currently competes in the Featherweight division of CES MMA. A professional mixed martial artist since 2012, Arnett also competed in the UFC.

== Background ==
Arnett was born in Lewiston, Idaho. He started training in his father Frank Arnett's karate school at a young age. After buying many Gracie Jiu Jitsu DVD's and attending seminars, he was able to develop his ground game to go along with his karate background. He transitioned to MMA at the age of 13 when his father opened up an MMA gym and completed his first amateur MMA bout two years later.

== Mixed martial arts career ==
=== Early career ===
Arnett started his professional MMA career in 2012 and fought primarily on the regional circuit of the Pacific Northwest United States. He amassed a record of 15–3 before signed by UFC.

=== Dana White's Tuesday Night Contention Series ===
Arnett faced Brandon Davis on August 1, 2017, at Dana White's Contender Series 4. He lost the fight via unanimous decision.

=== Ultimate Fighting Championship ===
Arnett made his promotional debut on January 27, 2018, against Cory Sandhagen at UFC on Fox 27. He lost the fight via technical knockout in round two.

Arnett faced Hakeem Dawodu on July 28, 2018, at UFC on Fox 30. He lost the fight via unanimous decision.

Arnett faced Humberto Bandenay on November 17, 2018, at UFC Fight Night: Magny vs. Ponzinibbio. He won the fight via unanimous decision.

Arnett faced Shane Young on February 10, 2019, at UFC 234. He lost the fight via unanimous decision.

On July 7, 2019, it was reported that Arnett was released by the UFC.

=== Post-UFC career ===
After the release, Arnett was scheduled to challenge Rolando Dy for the UAE Warriors Featherweight Championship at UAE Warriors 8 on October 19, 2019. However, Arnett withdrew from the bout and was replaced by Do Gyeom Lee.

He made his promotional debut against Elias Boudegzdame at UAE Warriors 10 on January 31, 2020. He lost the fight via unanimous decision.

Arnett was scheduled to face Dinis Paiva in a featherweight bout at CES MMA 61 on April 24, 2020. However, the event was postponed indefinitely due to the COVID-19 pandemic.

Arnett faced Daniel Vega in a catchweight bout at UAE Warriors 18 on March 20, 2021. He won the fight via third-round knockout.

Arnett is now again scheduled to challenge for the UAE Warriors Featherweight Championship against Do Gyeom Lee at UAE Warriors 24 on October 29, 2021.

== Mixed martial arts record ==
Professional record breakdown
26 matches	19 wins	7 losses
By knockout	8	1
By submission	7	1
By decision	4	5

Res.	Record	Opponent	Method	Event	Date	Round	Time	Location	Notes
Win	19–7	Solo Hatley Jr.	Submission (rear-naked choke)	Front Street Fights 30	January 31, 2025	2	3:27	Boise, Idaho, United States	
Win	18–7	Nathan Stolen	Submission (rear-naked choke)	Front Street Fights 24	August 6, 2022	4	1:26	Boise, Idaho, United States	Return to Lightweight. Won the FSF Lightweight Championship.
Win	17–7	Daniel Vega	KO (punches)	UAE Warriors 18	March 20, 2021	3	2:40	Abu Dhabi, United Arab Emirates	Catchweight (150 lb) bout.
Loss	16–7	Elias Boudegzdame	Decision (unanimous)	UAE Warriors 10	January 31, 2020	3	5:00	Abu Dhabi, United Arab Emirates	
Loss	16–6	Shane Young	Decision (unanimous)	UFC 234	February 10, 2019	3	5:00	Melbourne, Australia	
Win	16–5	Humberto Bandenay	Decision (unanimous)	UFC Fight Night: Magny vs. Ponzinibbio	November 17, 2018	3	5:00	Buenos Aires, Argentina	
Loss	15–5	Hakeem Dawodu	Decision (unanimous)	UFC on Fox: Alvarez vs. Poirier 2	July 28, 2018	3	5:00	Calgary, Alberta, Canada	
Loss	15–4	Cory Sandhagen	TKO (punches)	UFC on Fox: Jacaré vs. Brunson 2	January 27, 2018	2	3:48	Charlotte, North Carolina, United States	
Loss	15–3	Brandon Davis	Decision (unanimous)	Dana White's Contender Series 4	August 1, 2017	3	5:00	Las Vegas, Nevada, United States	Return to Featherweight.
Win	15–2	Jake Jokela	Submission (triangle choke)	ExciteFight: Conquest of the Cage	June 10, 2017	2	1:08	Airway Heights, Washington, United States	
Win	14–2	Chris Dempsey	TKO (punches)	Thunder & Lightning: Pro-Am MMA	April 1, 2017	1	3:09	Lewiston, Idaho, United States	
Win	13–2	Jerome Jones	Submission (rear-naked choke)	Conquest of the Cage 24	November 11, 2016	1	4:49	Airway Heights, Washington, United States	
Win	12–2	Charon Spain	Submission (rear-naked choke)	Thunder & Lightning: Pro-Am MMA	August 12, 2016	2	3:54	Lewiston, Idaho, United States	
Win	11–2	Dave Burrow	Decision (unanimous)	Titan FC 37	March 4, 2016	3	5:00	Ridgefield, Washington, United States	
Win	10–2	Matt Coble	Decision (unanimous)	ExciteFight: Supreme MMA Showdown	January 22, 2016	3	5:00	Tulalip, Washington, United States	Won the vacant COGA Lightweight Championship.
Win	9–2	Nathan Thompson	KO (punch)	Conquest of the Cage 21	November 6, 2015	1	1:02	Airway Heights, Washington, United States	
Win	8–2	Joseph Cleveland	TKO (punches)	KOTC: Bad Reputation	August 20, 2015	1	1:10	Worley, Idaho, United States	Catchweight (150 lb) bout.
Win	7–2	Steve Wing	TKO (submission to punches)	ExciteFight: Mission Mayhem Fight Night	July 11, 2015	1	0:41	Pendleton, Oregon, United States	
Win	6–2	Josh Solis	Submission (guillotine choke)	ExciteFight: March Mayhem	March 27, 2015	1	0:15	Pendleton, Oregon, United States	Lightweight debut.
Win	5–2	Tony Reyes	Decision (unanimous)	Conquest of the Cage 17	August 22, 2014	3	5:00	Pendleton, Oregon, United States	
Win	4–2	Donald Gouge	TKO (punches)	Conquest of the Cage 16	May 30, 2014	1	1:38	Airway Heights, Washington, United States	
Win	3–2	Chris Ensley	KO (punch)	Thunder & Lightning: Combat in the Cage 19	January 18, 2014	1	1:50	Lewiston, Idaho, United States	
Loss	2–2	Clinton Teeples	Submission (guillotine choke)	Conquest of the Cage 14	November 20, 2013	1	1:13	Airway Heights, Washington, United States	
Win	2–1	Daniel Atnip	Submission (guillotine choke)	Conquest of the Cage 13	July 13, 2012	1	N/A	Airway Heights, Washington, United States	
Loss	1–1	Eduardo Torres	Decision (unanimous)	CageSport 22	December 1, 2012	3	5:00	Fife, Washington, United States	
Win	1–0	John Martinez	TKO (punches)	Thunder & Lightning: Rumble on the River	August 11, 2012	1	2:44	Lewiston, Idaho, United States	Featherweight debut.

== Championships and accomplishments ==
- Front Street Fights
  - FSF Lightweight Championship (One time; current)

== Professional boxing record ==
1 fight	1 win	0 losses
By knockout	1	0

No.	Result	Record	Opponent	Type	Round, time	Date	Location	Notes
1	Win	1–0	(United States) Daryl Gardner	TKO	1 (4)	15 Oct 2016	(United States) Clear Water Casino, Lapwai, Idaho, US	

== See also ==
- List of male mixed martial artists
