= Polo Reyes =

Mexican mixed martial artist

- Born: November 7, 1984 (age 42); Mexicali, Baja California, Mexico
- Other names: El Toro, Torito
- Height: 5 ft 11 in (1.80 m)
- Weight: 70 kg (154 lb; 11 st 0 lb)
- Division: Welterweight; Lightweight; Featherweight
- Reach: 71 in (180 cm)
- Fighting out of: Tepic, Nayarit, Mexico
- Team: Entram Gym
- Rank: Purple belt in Brazilian jiu-jitsu
- Years active: 2009–present

Mixed martial arts record
- Total: 20
- Wins: 11
- By knockout: 8
- By submission: 1
- By decision: 2
- Losses: 9
- By knockout: 6
- By submission: 3

Other information
- Mixed martial arts record from Sherdog

Marco Polo Reyes is a Mexican mixed martial artist who competed in the UFC. A professional since 2009, he was also a contestant on The Ultimate Fighter: Latin America 2.

== Background ==
Reyes was born on November 7, 1984, in Mexicali, Baja California, Mexico. Prior to become a fighter, Reyes was a carpenter. He started self-defense classes which led him into MMA training and later in competition. He was the Mexico national champion and held two regional titles in this homeland.

== Mixed martial arts career ==
=== Early career ===
Reyes was attached to various promotions in Mexico from 2009 to 2014 with a MMA record of 4–3–0 period before joining The Ultimate Fighter: Latin America 2 competition.

=== The Ultimate Fighter: Latin America ===
In 2015, Reyes joined The Ultimate Fighter: Latin America 2 under team Efraín Escudero. On episode 7, Reyes faced Christihian Soto from Nicaragua in a lightweight fight, winning via TKO due to punches in the second round. On episode 10, Reyes faced Horacio Gutiérrez from Mexico in the semi-final round. He was defeated via TKO due to punches in the first round.

=== Ultimate Fighting Championship ===
Reyes faced Cesar Arzamendia on the preliminary card on UFC Fight Night 78 on November 21, 2015. He starched Arzmaendia with a win via one punch knock-out in the first round.

On June 4, 2016, Reyes was up against Dong Hyun Ma on June 4, 2016, at UFC 199. Reyes knocked out Kim in the third round. Both participants were awarded Fight of the Night honors.

Reyes faced Jason Novelli on November 5, 2016, at UFC Fight Night 98 and nabbed split decision win with the scores card of 29–28, 28–29 and 29–28.

Reyes next faced James Vick on May 13, 2017, at UFC 211. He lost the fight via TKO in the first round.

Reyes faced Matt Frevola on January 14, 2018, at UFC Fight Night: Stephens vs. Choi. He won by knockout one minute into the fight. He was awarded Performance of the Night.

Reyes received a suspension from USADA for six months for tested positive for banned substance ostarine from an out-of-competition drug test conducted on March 8, 2018, resulted from contaminated supplement.

Reyes faced Damir Hadžović on February 23, 2019, at UFC Fight Night 145. He lost the fight via knockout in the second round.

Reyes faced Drew Dober on June 29, 2019, at UFC on ESPN 3. He lost the fight via technical knockout in the first round.

Reyes faced Kyle Nelson on September 21, 2019, at UFC on ESPN+ 17. He lost the fight via TKO in the first round.

Reyes was released by the UFC on February 11, 2020.

=== LUX Fight League ===
As the first fight after the release, Reyes signed to LUX Fight League and faced Ricardo Arreola at LUX 011 on November 20, 2020. He won the fight via first-round knockout.

He faced Marco Elpidio at LUX 013 on May 7, 2021. He won the bout via unanimous decision.

Reyes then faced Fernando Martinez at LUX 018 on November 5, 2021. He lost the fight via first-round submission.

== Championships and accomplishments ==
- Ultimate Fighting Championship
  - Fight of the Night (One time) vs. Dong Hyun Ma
  - Performance of the Night (Two times) vs. Cesar Arzamendia and Matt Frevola
  - Sixth shortest average fight time in UFC Lightweight division history (6:03)
  - Second most knockdowns-per-fifteen minutes in UFC Lightweight division history (1.77)
  - UFC.com Awards
    - 2016: Ranked #7 Fight of the Year vs. Kim Dong-hyun

== Mixed martial arts record ==
Professional record breakdown
20 matches	11 wins	9 losses
By knockout	8	6
By submission	1	3
By decision	2	0

Res.	Record	Opponent	Method	Event	Date	Round	Time	Location	Notes
Win	11–9	Allan Zuñiga	TKO (punches)	Supreme Fight Night 6	August 23, 2024	1	3:43	Guadalajara, Mexico	
Loss	10–9	Adam Assenza	TKO (punches)	BTC 20: Night of Champions II	June 17, 2023	3	1:31	Burlington, Ontario, Canada	For the vacant BTC Lightweight Championship.
Loss	10–8	Fernando Martinez	Submission (guillotine choke)	LUX 018	November 5, 2021	1	4:03	Acapulco, Mexico	
Win	10–7	Marco Elpidio	Decision (unanimous)	LUX 013	May 7, 2021	3	5:00	San Pedro Garza García, Mexico	
Win	9–7	Ricardo Arreola	TKO (punches)	LUX 011	November 20, 2020	1	4:08	Monterrey, Mexico	Return to Lightweight.
Loss	8–7	Kyle Nelson	TKO (punches)	UFC Fight Night: Rodríguez vs. Stephens	September 21, 2019	1	1:36	Mexico City, Mexico	Featherweight debut.
Loss	8–6	Drew Dober	TKO (punches)	UFC on ESPN: Ngannou vs. dos Santos	June 29, 2019	1	1:07	Minneapolis, Minnesota, United States	
Loss	8–5	Damir Hadžović	TKO (punches)	UFC Fight Night: Błachowicz vs. Santos	February 23, 2019	2	2:03	Prague, Czech Republic	
Win	8–4	Matt Frevola	KO (punches)	UFC Fight Night: Stephens vs. Choi	January 14, 2018	1	1:00	St. Louis, Missouri, United States	Performance of the Night.
Loss	7–4	James Vick	TKO (punches)	UFC 211	May 13, 2017	1	2:39	Dallas, Texas, United States	
Win	7–3	Jason Novelli	Decision (split)	The Ultimate Fighter Latin America 3 Finale: dos Anjos vs. Ferguson	November 5, 2016	3	5:00	Mexico City, Mexico	
Win	6–3	Ma Dong-hyun	KO (punches)	UFC 199	June 4, 2016	3	1:52	Inglewood, California, United States	Fight of the Night.
Win	5–3	Cesar Arzamendia	KO (punch)	The Ultimate Fighter Latin America 2 Finale: Magny vs. Gastelum	November 21, 2015	1	3:42	Monterrey, Mexico	Performance of the Night.
Win	4–3	José Luis Medrano	Submission (triangle choke)	World Fighters Championship 13	November 29, 2014	2	2:05	Monterrey, Mexico	Lightweight debut. Won the WFC Mexico Lightweight Championship.
Loss	3–3	Erick Montaño	Submission (rear-naked choke)	Xtreme Kombat 25	August 30, 2014	1	N/A	Naucalpan de Juárez, Mexico	
Loss	3–2	Randall Wallace	TKO (punches)	Argos MMA Fighting	September 14, 2013	1	2:58	Jalisco, Mexico	
Loss	3–1	Ran Weathers	Submission (rear-naked choke)	Duelo De Giagantes: Round 2	June 8, 2013	1	1:27	Zumpango, Mexico	
Win	3–0	Mike Prokop	TKO (punches)	Duelo De Giagantes: Round 1	June 2, 2013	2	4:27	Mexico City, Mexico	
Win	2–0	Jaime Tyson	TKO (punches)	Black Fighting Championships 6	October 30, 2012	1	N/A	Jalisco, Mexico	
Win	1–0	Alejandro Aguilar	TKO (punches)	Inevitable Fight Night	August 30, 2012	1	N/A	Jalisco, Mexico	

== See also ==
- List of current UFC fighters
- List of Mexican UFC fighters
- List of male mixed martial artists
