= UFC on Fox: Jacaré vs. Brunson 2 =

UFC mixed martial arts event in 2018

- The poster for UFC on Fox: Jacaré vs. Brunson 2
- Promotion: Ultimate Fighting Championship
- Date: January 27, 2018
- Venue: Spectrum Center
- City: Charlotte, North Carolina, U.S
- Attendance: 10,249
- Total gate: $944,202

Event chronology
UFC 220: Miocic vs. Ngannou	UFC on Fox: Jacaré vs. Brunson 2	UFC Fight Night: Machida vs. Anders

UFC on Fox: Jacaré vs. Brunson 2 (also known as UFC on Fox 27) was a mixed martial arts event produced by the Ultimate Fighting Championship held on January 27, 2018, at Spectrum Center in Charlotte, North Carolina, United States.

== Background ==
The event marked the promotion's fourth visit to Charlotte, and first since UFC Fight Night: Florian vs. Gomi in March 2010.

A middleweight rematch between former Strikeforce Middleweight Champion Ronaldo Souza and Derek Brunson served as the event headliner. The pairing met previously in August 2012 under the Strikeforce banner with Souza winning the fight via knockout in the first round.

Ilir Latifi was expected to face former interim UFC Light Heavyweight Championship challenger Ovince Saint Preux at the event. However, on January 16, Latifi pulled out due to injury and the bout was scrapped. The pairing was then rescheduled for UFC on Fox: Emmett vs. Stephens.

== Results ==
Main Card (Fox)
Weight class				Method	Round	Time	Notes
Middleweight	Ronaldo Souza	def.	Derek Brunson	KO (head kick and punches)	1	3:50
Featherweight	Andre Fili	def.	Dennis Bermudez	Decision (split) (29–28, 27–30, 29–28)	3	5:00
Lightweight	Gregor Gillespie	def.	Jordan Rinaldi	TKO (punches)	1	4:46
Welterweight	Drew Dober	def.	Frank Camacho	Decision (unanimous) (29–28, 29–28, 30–27)	3	5:00
Preliminary Card (Fox Sports 1)
Lightweight	Bobby Green	def.	Erik Koch	Decision (unanimous) (29–28, 29–28, 29–28)	3	5:00
Featherweight	Mirsad Bektić	def.	Godofredo Pepey	TKO (body punch)	1	2:47
Women's Flyweight	Katlyn Chookagian	def.	Mara Romero Borella	Decision (unanimous) (29–28, 29–28, 30–27)	3	5:00
Women's Strawweight	Randa Markos	def.	Juliana Lima	Decision (unanimous) (30–27, 30–27, 30–27)	3	5:00
Women's Flyweight	Ji Yeon Kim	def.	Justine Kish	Decision (split) (29–28, 28–29, 30–27)	3	5:00
Lightweight	Vinc Pichel	def.	Joaquim Silva	Decision (unanimous) (29–28, 29–28, 29–28)	3	5:00
Preliminary Card (UFC Fight Pass)
Welterweight	Niko Price	def.	George Sullivan	Submission (rear-naked choke)	2	4:21
Featherweight	Cory Sandhagen	def.	Austin Arnett	TKO (punches)	2	3:48

== Bonus awards ==
The following fighters were awarded $50,000 bonuses:

- Fight of the Night: Drew Dober vs. Frank Camacho
- Performance of the Night: Ronaldo Souza and Mirsad Bektić

== See also ==
- List of UFC events
- 2018 in UFC
- List of current UFC fighters
