= Hector Aldana =

Mexican mixed martial arts fighter

- Born: August 17, 1988 (age 38); Mexico
- Other names: El Charro
- Height: 5 ft 11 in (1.80 m)
- Weight: 170 lb (77 kg; 12 st 2 lb)
- Division: Welterweight
- Reach: 72 in (183 cm)
- Fighting out of: Mexicali, Baja California, Mexico
- Team: Torture Athletics
- Years active: 2011–present

Mixed martial arts record
- Total: 8
- Wins: 5
- By knockout: 2
- By submission: 2
- By decision: 1
- Losses: 3
- By knockout: 2
- By decision: 1

Other information
- Mixed martial arts record from Sherdog

Hector Aldana (born August 17, 1988) is a Mexican mixed martial artist who competed in the Welterweight division of the Ultimate Fighting Championship (UFC).

== Mixed martial arts career ==
=== Early career ===
Aldana compiled a professional mixed martial arts record of 4–0 by fighting solely within the Mexicali regional MMA circuit before signing for UFC in June 2018.

=== The Ultimate Fighter ===
Aldana was selected as one of the cast members for The Ultimate Fighter: Latin America 2, UFC The Ultimate Fighter TV series, under Team Efrain Escudero in April 2015.

In the elimination round, Aldana won the fight against Álvaro Herrera by unanimous decision.

In the semi-finals, Aldana lost the fight to Enrique Marín via submission with a rear-naked choke in the first round.

=== Ultimate Fighting Championship ===
Aldana made his UFC debut against Kenan Song on June 23, 2018, at UFC Fight Night: Cowboy vs. Edwards. He lost the fight via TKO in the second round.

Aldana then faced Laureano Staropoli on November 17, 2018, at UFC Fight Night: Magny vs. Ponzinibbio. He lost the fight via unanimous decision. This fight earned him the Fight of the Night bonus award.

Aldana then faced Miguel Baeza on October 12, 2019, at UFC Fight Night: Joanna vs. Waterson. He lost the fight via TKO in the first round.

Aldana was released by the UFC in February 2020.

== Championships and accomplishments ==
- Ultimate Fighting Championship
  - Fight of the Night (One Time) vs. Laureano Staropoli

== Mixed martial arts record ==
Professional record breakdown
8 matches	5 wins	3 losses
By knockout	2	2
By submission	2	0
By decision	1	1

Res.	Record	Opponent	Method	Event	Date	Round	Time	Location	Notes
Win	5–3	Jorge Arturo Salazar	Submission (keylock)	Cage Gladiators Championship 1	September 30, 2023	2	2:58	Mexicali, Baja California, Mexico	
Loss	4–3	Miguel Baeza	TKO (leg kick and elbows)	UFC Fight Night: Joanna vs. Waterson	October 12, 2019	2	2:32	Tampa, Florida, United States	
Loss	4–2	Laureano Staropoli	Decision (unanimous)	UFC Fight Night: Magny vs. Ponzinibbio	November 17, 2018	3	5:00	Buenos Aires, Argentina	Fight of the Night.
Loss	4–1	Song Kenan	TKO (punches)	UFC Fight Night: Cowboy vs. Edwards	June 23, 2018	2	4:42	Kallang, Singapore	
Win	4–0	Ivest Samayoa	TKO (punches)	Fights Factory – Sabori vs. Enriquez	November 16, 2013	3	1:30	Mexicali, Baja California, Mexico	
Win	3–0	Ivan Castillo	TKO (punches)	CG – Cage Gladiator 8	March 16, 2013	1	3:49	Mexicali, Baja California, Mexico	
Win	2–0	Cesar Carrasco	Decision (unanimous)	LAW 5 - Payback	August 18, 2012	3	5:00	Mexicali, Baja California, Mexico	
Win	1–0	Jorge Arturo Salazar	Submission (rear-naked choke)	LAW 1 - Heatwave	July 16, 2011	1	1:37	Mexicali, Baja California, Mexico	Welterweight debut

=== Mixed martial arts exhibition record ===
Exhibition record breakdown		
2 matches	1 win	1 loss
By submission	0	1
By decision	1	0

Res.	Record	Opponent	Method	Event	Date	Round	Time	Location	Notes
Loss	1–1	Enrique Marín	Submission (rear-naked choke)	The Ultimate Fighter: Latin America 2	May 4, 2015	1	1:02	Las Vegas, Nevada, United States	Semifinal round.
Win	1–0	Álvaro Herrera	Decision (unanimous)	The Ultimate Fighter: Latin America 2	April 10, 2015	2	5:00	Las Vegas, Nevada, United States	Elimination round.

== See also ==
- List of Mexican UFC fighters
- List of male mixed martial artists
