= Dong Hyun Ma =

Korean mixed martial arts fighter

Ma Dong-hyun
- Born: Kim Dong-hyun; September 9, 1988 (age 38); Busan, South Korea
- Native name: 김동현 金東炫
- Other names: Maestro (마에스트로)
- Nationality: South Korean
- Height: 5 ft 11 in (1.80 m)
- Weight: 155 lb (70 kg; 11 st 1 lb)
- Division: Lightweight
- Reach: 70 in (178 cm)
- Style: Judo, Boxing, Taekwondo
- Fighting out of: Busan, South Korea
- Team: Busan Team M.A.D.
- Rank: 1st degree black belt in Judo
- Years active: 2007–present

Mixed martial arts record
- Total: 30
- Wins: 16
- By knockout: 6
- By submission: 6
- By decision: 4
- Losses: 11
- By knockout: 4
- By submission: 2
- By decision: 5
- Draws: 3

Other information
- Mixed martial arts record from Sherdog

Kim Dong-hyun (Korean: 김동현, 金東炫; born September 9, 1988), anglicized as Dong Hyun Kim, also known as "The Maestro", is a South Korean mixed martial artist who most recently competed in the UFC's lightweight division. At the turn of 2019, he began to use the ring name Ma Dong-hyun (마동현; anglicized as Dong Hyun Ma; "Ma" as in "Maestro") to better distinguish himself from fellow South Korean mixed martial artist "Stun Gun" Kim Dong-hyun.

== Mixed martial arts career ==
=== Early career ===
Ma began his professional MMA career in March 2007. Over the next eight years, he split his time between his native South Korea and Japan while fighting for promotions such as Spirit FC, Road FC and Deep. During this time he amassed a record of 13 wins, 6 losses and 3 draws.

=== Ultimate Fighting Championship ===
In his UFC debut, Ma replaced Hyun Gyu Lim against Dominique Steele on November 28, 2015, at UFC Fight Night: Henderson vs. Masvidal. He lost the fight via knockout due to a slam in the third round.

In his second bout for the promotion, Ma faced Polo Reyes on June 4, 2016, at UFC 199. He lost the back-and-forth fight via knockout in the third round. Despite the loss, Ma was awarded his first Fight of the Night bonus award.

In his third fight for the promotion, Ma faced Brendan O'Reilly on December 3, 2016, at The Ultimate Fighter: Tournament of Champions Finale. Ma won the fight by unanimous decision to earn his first UFC victory.

In his highest profile UFC fight to date, Ma faced Takanori Gomi on September 23, 2017, at UFC Fight Night: Saint Preux vs. Okami. He won the fight via TKO in the first round.

Ma faced Damien Brown on February 11, 2018, at UFC 221. He won the fight by split decision.

Ma faced Devonte Smith on February 10, 2019, at UFC 234. He lost the fight via technical knockout in round one.

Ma faced Scott Holtzman on August 3, 2019, at UFC on ESPN 5. At the weigh-ins, Ma weighed in at 158 lbs, 2 pounds over the lightweight non-title fight limit of 156 lbs. He was fined 20% of his fight purse to Holtzman, and the bout proceeded at catchweight. He lost the fight via TKO due to a doctor stoppage between the second and third round as the swelling on Ma's right eye rendered him unable to continue.

Ma faced Omar Morales on December 21, 2019, at UFC on ESPN+ 23. He lost the fight by unanimous decision.

On March 19, 2020, news revealed that Ma and the UFC had parted ways.

== Championships and accomplishments ==
- Top FC
  - Top FC Lightweight Tournament 2015 winner
- Ultimate Fighting Championship
  - Fight of the Night (One time) vs. Polo Reyes
  - UFC.com Awards
    - 2016: Ranked #7 Fight of the Year vs. Polo Reyes

== Mixed martial arts record ==
Professional record breakdown
30 matches	16 wins	11 losses
By knockout	6	4
By submission	6	2
By decision	4	5
Draws	3	

Res.	Record	Opponent	Method	Event	Date	Round	Time	Location	Notes
Loss	16–11–3	Omar Morales	Decision (unanimous)	UFC Fight Night: Edgar vs. The Korean Zombie	December 21, 2019	3	5:00	Busan, South Korea	
Loss	16–10–3	Scott Holtzman	TKO (doctor stoppage)	UFC on ESPN: Covington vs. Lawler	August 3, 2019	2	5:00	Newark, New Jersey, United States	Catchweight (158 lbs) bout; Ma missed weight.
Loss	16–9–3	Devonte Smith	TKO (punches)	UFC 234	February 10, 2019	1	3:53	Melbourne, Australia	
Win	16–8–3	Damien Brown	Decision (split)	UFC 221	February 11, 2018	3	5:00	Perth, Australia	
Win	15–8–3	Takanori Gomi	TKO (punches)	UFC Fight Night: Saint Preux vs. Okami	September 23, 2017	1	1:30	Saitama, Japan	
Win	14–8–3	Brendan O'Reilly	Decision (unanimous)	The Ultimate Fighter: Tournament of Champions Finale	December 3, 2016	3	5:00	Las Vegas, Nevada, United States	
Loss	13–8–3	Polo Reyes	KO (punches)	UFC 199	June 4, 2016	3	1:52	Inglewood, California, United States	Fight of the Night.
Loss	13–7–3	Dominique Steele	KO (slam)	UFC Fight Night: Henderson vs. Masvidal	November 28, 2015	3	0:27	Seoul, South Korea	Welterweight bout.
Win	13–6–3	Jung Min Kang	Submission (rear-naked choke)	Top FC 8: Heart of a Champion	April 15, 2015	1	4:07	Seoul, South Korea	Won the Top FC Lightweight Tournament.
Win	12–6–3	Toshikatsu Harada	TKO (punches)	Top FC 6: Unbreakable Dream	April 5, 2015	1	4:51	Seoul, South Korea	Top FC Lightweight Tournament Semifinal.
Loss	11–6–3	Kuniyoshi Hironaka	Technical Submission (arm-triangle choke)	Vale Tudo Japan - VTJ 6th	October 4, 2014	2	2:23	Seoul, South Korea	Lightweight debut.
Win	11–5–3	Suk-Young Lee	KO (punch)	Sun FC 2	June 28, 2014	1	0:45	Busan, South Korea	Catchweight (176 lbs) bout.
Win	10–5–3	Rekson Rekson	TKO (punches)	King of Fight 4	May 17, 2014	1	0:10	Jinju, South Korea	Catchweight (165 lbs) bout.
Win	9–5–3	In Ho Cha	Submission (cattle catch neck crank)	Road FC 3: Explosion	July 24, 2011	1	3:25	Seoul, South Korea	Catchweight (176 lbs) bout.
Win	8–5–3	Yuta Nakamura	TKO (doctor stoppage)	Gladiator 18	May 22, 2011	2	2:15	Fukuoka, Japan	
Win	7–5–3	Yong Jae Lee	Submission (rear-naked choke)	KF-1: MMA World Competition	April 30, 2011	3	5:00	Seoul, South Korea	
Loss	6–5–3	Yoshitomo Watanabe	Decision (unanimous)	Deep 49: Impact	August 27, 2010	2	5:00	Tokyo, Japan	
Loss	6–4–3	Shigetoshi Iwase	Decision (unanimous)	Deep 48: Impact	July 3, 2010	2	5:00	Tokyo, Japan	
Win	6–3–3	Hiromu Nagado	Submission (rear-naked choke)	KOF: The Beginning of Legend	April 24, 2010	1	4:38	Seoul, South Korea	
Loss	5–3–3	Hidetaka Monma	Decision (unanimous)	Deep: Fan Thanksgiving Festival 2	November 20, 2009	2	5:00	Seoul, South Korea	Welterweight debut.
Draw	5–2–3	Vaughn Anderson	Draw	AOW 14: Ground Zero	September 26, 2009	2	5:00	Seoul, South Korea	
Win	5–2–2	Lubomir Guedjev	TKO (doctor stoppage)	AOW 13: Rising Force	July 18, 2009	1	4:38	Seoul, South Korea	
Draw	4–2–2	Sang Il	Draw	Spirit MC 18: The Champion	August 31, 2008	2	5:00	Seoul, South Korea	
Loss	4–2–1	Ho Jin Kim	Decision (majority)	Spirit MC 17: All In	June 29, 2008	2	5:00	Seoul, South Korea	
Win	4–1–1	Hoo Sun Lee	Submission (guillotine choke)	Spirit MC 16: Clash of Pride	April 27, 2008	2	1:31	Seoul, South Korea	
Draw	3–1–1	Jung Hwan Cha	Draw	Spirit MC 15: Come Back Home	March 1, 2008	3	5:00	Seoul, South Korea	
Loss	3–1	Yoon Young Kim	Submission (armbar)	Spirit MC Interleague 6: The Road	June 17, 2007	1	2:29	Seoul, South Korea	
Win	3–0	Ki Chool Jung	Decision (unanimous)	Spirit MC Interleague 5	March 11, 2007	2	5:00	Seoul, South Korea	Won the Spirit MC Middleweight Tournament.
Win	2–0	Dae Gun Kim	Submission (triangle choke)	Spirit MC Interleague 5	March 11, 2007	1	2:45	Seoul, South Korea	Spirit MC Middleweight Tournament Semifinal.
Win	1–0	Myeon Kwang Min	Decision (unanimous)	Spirit MC Interleague 5	March 11, 2007	2	5:00	Seoul, South Korea	Spirit MC Middleweight Tournament Quarterfinal.

== See also ==
- List of current UFC fighters
- List of male mixed martial artists
