= UFC on Fox: Alvarez vs. Poirier 2 =

UFC mixed martial arts event in 2018

- The poster for UFC on Fox: Alvarez vs. Poirier 2
- Promotion: Ultimate Fighting Championship
- Date: July 28, 2018
- Venue: Scotiabank Saddledome
- City: Calgary, Alberta, Canada
- Attendance: 10,603
- Total gate: $1.300,000

Event chronology
UFC Fight Night: Shogun vs. Smith	UFC on Fox: Alvarez vs. Poirier 2	UFC 227: Dillashaw vs. Garbrandt 2

UFC on Fox: Alvarez vs. Poirier 2 (also known as UFC on Fox 30) was a mixed martial arts event produced by the Ultimate Fighting Championship held on July 28, 2018 at the Scotiabank Saddledome in Calgary, Alberta, Canada.

== Background ==
The event was the second that the promotion had contested in Calgary, following UFC 149 in July 2012.

A lightweight rematch between former two-time Bellator Lightweight Champion and former UFC Lightweight Champion Eddie Alvarez and Dustin Poirier was the main event of the card. Their first bout at UFC 211 in May 2017 was ruled a no contest after Alvarez hit a downed Poirier with illegal knees in the second round.

A light heavyweight bout between Gadzhimurad Antigulov and Ion Cuțelaba was previously scheduled for UFC 217. However, Antigulov pulled out of the fight due to injury and the bout was scrapped. The matchup eventually happened at this event.

== Results ==
Main card (Fox)
Weight class				Method	Round	Time	Notes
Lightweight	Dustin Poirier	def.	Eddie Alvarez	TKO (punches)	2	4:05
Featherweight	José Aldo	def.	Jeremy Stephens	TKO (punches)	1	4:19
Women's Strawweight	Joanna Jędrzejczyk	def.	Tecia Torres	Decision (unanimous) (30–27, 30–27, 30–27)	3	5:00
Lightweight	Alexander Hernandez	def.	Olivier Aubin-Mercier	Decision (unanimous) (30–27, 29–28, 29–28)	3	5:00
Preliminary card (Fox)
Welterweight	Jordan Mein	def.	Alex Morono	Decision (unanimous) (29–28, 29–28, 29–28)	3	5:00
Featherweight	Hakeem Dawodu	def.	Austin Arnett	Decision (unanimous) (30–27, 30–27, 30–27)	3	5:00
Lightweight	Islam Makhachev	def.	Kajan Johnson	Submission (armbar)	1	4:43
Light Heavyweight	Ion Cuțelaba	def.	Gadzhimurad Antigulov	TKO (punches and elbows)	1	4:25
Preliminary card (UFC Fight Pass)
Lightweight	John Makdessi	def.	Ross Pearson	Decision (unanimous) (30–26, 29–27, 29–28)	3	5:00
Women's Flyweight	Katlyn Chookagian	def.	Alexis Davis	Decision (unanimous) (29–28, 29–28, 30–27)	3	5:00
Flyweight	Dustin Ortiz	def.	Matheus Nicolau	KO (head kick and punches)	1	3:49
Women's Strawweight	Nina Ansaroff	def.	Randa Markos	Decision (unanimous) (29–28, 29–28, 29–28)	3	5:00
Lightweight	Devin Powell	def.	Álvaro Herrera	KO (body kicks and punches)	1	1:52

== Bonus awards ==
The following fighters received $50,000 bonuses:

- Fight of the Night: John Makdessi vs. Ross Pearson
- Performance of the Night: Dustin Poirier and José Aldo

== See also ==
- List of UFC events
- 2018 in UFC
- List of current UFC fighters
