= The Ultimate Fighter: Latin America 2 =

UFC mixed martial arts television series and event in 2015

- Genre: Reality, Sports
- Created by: Frank Fertitta III, Lorenzo Fertitta, Dana White
- Starring: Dana White, Efraín Escudero, and Kelvin Gastelum

Production
- Running time: 60 minutes

Original release
- Network: Televisa, UFC Fight Pass
- Release: August 26 – November 11, 2015

The Ultimate Fighter: Latin America 2 was an installment of the Ultimate Fighting Championship (UFC)-produced reality television series The Ultimate Fighter. It was the ninth international series and the second to feature mainly Latin American fighters.

On October 29, 2014, it was announced that the coaches for the season would be Kelvin Gastelum and Efraín Escudero. As the coaches compete in two separate weight classes, they are not expected to face each other at the end of the season.

The UFC held open tryouts for the show on March 29, 2015. The casting call was for Lightweight and Welterweight fighters who are at least 21 years old and have a minimum of two wins in three professional fights. The cast was announced on April 22, 2015.

The cast consisted of fighters from 9 countries: Arzamendia, from Paraguay; Barzola and Olano, from Peru; Meza and Ramos, from Panama; Ortega, from Chile; Soto, from Nicaragua; Fernández, from Honduras; Marín, from Spain; Medinilla, from Argentina and Gutiérrez, Polo Reyes, Salas, Aldana, Herrera and Montaño, from Mexico.

== Cast ==
=== Teams ===
Boxing Coach Wil Beech

Team Gastelum

- Kelvin Gastelum, Head Coach
- Victor Davila, Jiu Jitsu Coach
- Terrell Hunsinger Jr.
- Brian Beaumont

Team Escudero

- Efraín Escudero, Head Coach
- Augusto Mendes, Jiu Jitsu Coach
- John Crouch, Jiu Jitsu Coach
- Shaine Jaime, Wrestling Coach
- Jarret Aki, Strength and Conditioning Coach
- Benson Henderson
- Yaotzin Meza
- Wil Beech Boxing Muay Thai Coach

=== Fighters ===
- Team Gastelum
  - Welterweights: Erick Montaño, Enrique Marín, Hector Aldana, and Wilmer Fernandez
  - Lightweights: Cesar Arzamendia, Danny Salas, Jonathan Ortega, and Christhian Soto
- Team Escudero
  - Welterweights: Kevin Medinilla, Marco Olano, Álvaro Herrera, and Vernon Ramos
  - Lightweights: Horacio Gutiérrez, Enrique Barzola, Polo Reyes, and Oliver Meza

== Episodes ==
Episode 1: (August 26, 2015)

- Unlike the first season from Latin America, the second does not feature region versus region, but instead, Gastelum and Escudero were able to evaluate all the fighters on the show and then select their eight-man teams for the competition this year.
- Gastelum and Escudero go through their selections with the rest of their coaching staffs to begin picking the teams. Since Escudero won the coin toss, he was allowed to decide whether he would get the first fighter or choose the first fight. Escudero opts to make the first selection and he went with Kevin Medinilla. Gastelum opted for Cesar Arzamendia and the choices went back and forth for 16 selections overall until all the welterweights and lightweights had been broken up into two teams.
- Once the teams are selected, Gastelum is allowed to make his selection for the first fight and he goes with his No. 1 pick at welterweight, Cesar Arzamendia, against the final pick for Team Escudero, Oliver Meza.
- The fighters get a surprise when they get a visit by former Ultimate Fighter champion Forrest Griffin.
- Cesar Arzamendia defeated Oliver Meza via first-round TKO (punches).
- Gastelum announces the first welterweight fight: Erick Montaño vs. Marco Olano.

Episode 2: (September 2, 2015)

- Team Escudero member Horacio Gutiérrez suffered a sprained ankle during a training session, limiting his ability to practice.
- To mask his injury from the other team, Gutiérrez and his roommates decided to move his bed from the top bunk down to the floor so he could sleep there instead of being forced to jump or climb up on a sprained ankle. In turn, Gutiérrez kept his foot packed in ice hidden underneath the blankets in hopes of keeping his injury a secret. Whether Team Gastelum found out about the injury or Gutiérrez was already targeted, he found out later in the episode that the ankle would be tested.
- The first welterweight fight of the season was contested between Erick Montaño and Marco Olano. The fight came to an abrupt halt midway through the first round as Olano suffered a fractured arm while landing awkwardly after being taken down by Montaño.
- Erick Montaño defeated Marco Olano via first-round TKO (arm injury).
- Gastelum announces the next lightweight fight: Danny Salas vs. Horacio Gutiérrez.

Episode 3: (September 9, 2015)

- Marco Olano's injury was on the mind of Horacio Gutiérrez after he suffered an ankle injury and then got picked to compete next. Word of his injury had leaked out and he was selected to fight in just a few days. Gutiérrez refused to let an ankle injury knock him out of the fight or the competition although even he admitted it was impossible not to think about his ailment as the bout with Salas drew near.
- Gutiérrez's coach, Efrain Escudero brought in former Strikeforce women's bantamweight champion fighter Miesha Tate to help with his training while also assisting the rest of the team with some drills.
- Marco Olano returns from the hospital with his arm in a sling but is not expected to suffer any permanent damage from the injury. He promises to stay at the house and continue to cheer on Team Escudero from the sidelines despite being eliminated from the competition.
- Horacio Gutiérrez defeated Danny Salas via decision (majority) after three rounds.
- Escudero announces the next welterweight fight: Kevin Medinilla vs. Enrique Marín.

Episode 4: (September 16, 2015)

- Fighters from Team Gastelum were upset that Team Escudero had paid up on their bet from a couple of weeks ago. Leading into the fight between Erick Montaño and Marco Olano, Team Escudero and Team Gastelum wagered that the losing side in the bout would be forced to take their mattresses and pillows out to the tennis courts and sleep out under the stars for a night.
- Team Escudero opts to offer one more bet – double or nothing – and the losing team would be forced to clean the entire house, from top to bottom, while wearing bunny ears. Team Gastelum accepts.
- Enrique Marín defeated Kevin Medinilla via decision (majority) after two rounds.
- Gastelum announces the next lightweight fight: Jonathan Ortega vs. Enrique Barzola.

Episode 5: (September 23, 2015)

- The fighters are paid a visit by former Mexican national soccer coach Miguel “El Piojo” Herrera, and most of the fighters are enthralled when he arrives. Herrera invites the fighters from Team Gastelum and Team Escudero to another competition, playing soccer.
- The losing side will have to wash the winning team's van that they use to travel from the house to the gym and do it while wearing a thong. Team Gastelum wins the game after a spirited match 2 – 1.
- Team Escudero carries out their bet and washed the vans, but they decided to do so while clothed. When one of the fighters from Team Gastelum decides to try to make them pay up to the letter of the law, Escudero answers back by carrying the hose into the house and turning the car wash into a water and food fight.
- Enrique Barzola defeated Jonathan Ortega via decision (unanimous) after three rounds.
- Escudero announces the next welterweight fight: Álvaro Herrera vs. Hector Aldana.

Episode 6: (September 30, 2015)

- To get his team ready for the battle ahead, Escudero decides to unveil a new conditioning program that punishes the fighters' bodies to get them ready with superior cardio and conditioning.
- Back at the house, the fighters were paid a visit from Mexican actress Martha Higareda who showed up out of nowhere to spend some time with them for a day. The guys were immediately scrambling to pick things up off the floor to make a good impression on the beautiful actress.
- After the fighters showed Higareda a few of their moves, she offered them a night out on the town with her in Las Vegas. The fighters had been locked up for about four weeks, so they were thrilled, making a night out at a hibachi grill eating some food and having a few drinks being the perfect refresher.
- Hector Aldana defeated Álvaro Herrera via decision (unanimous) after two rounds.
- Gastelum announces the next lightweight fight: Christihian Soto vs. Marco Polo Reyes.

Episode 7: (October 7, 2015)

- Following the previous loss, the fighters from Team Escudero are convinced that their coach is over training them in the lead up to the competition as the fighters are still struggling with their conditioning after a few brutal weeks of training. They decide to talk to coach Escudero about the training regimen that feels a lot more like breaking them down right now than building them back up again.
- The fighters get a break and go to a local gym in Las Vegas, where they meet up with Dana White and Montserrat Oliver, who helps introduce this season's coach's challenge. As Escudero and Gastelum step into the gym, White informs the coaches that they will be sumo wrestling with bloated outfits and a simple game where Escudero and Gastelum will battle each other with the winner declared after scoring five points. Despite the weight disparity, Escudero holds his own against Gastelum as the two of them volley back and forth throughout the match. Finally, with the score tied, Escudero is able to trip up Gastelum and send him to the mat and outside the ring to end the match. Team Escudero finally wins a team competition after losing the two previous games this season and everybody on the team will get $1,500 as a prize while the coach leaves with an extra $10,000 to celebrate.
- Polo Reyes defeated Christihian Soto via TKO (punches) in the second round.
- Escudero announces the next welterweight fight: Vernon Ramos vs. Wilmer Fernandez.

Episode 8: (October 14, 2015)

- Panama's Vernon Ramos grew up around violence and in 2012, he lost his father under mysterious circumstances. His father was a big fight fan who wore a UFC hat around the house as he supported his son's dreams to make it to the big show one day. Ramos recalled that his father gave him a big hug and told the young man that from now on he needed to take care of his mother. He asked his father where he was going and he just said “for a walk.” Ramos' father opened the door and closed it behind him and that was the last time he ever saw him again. Rumors followed that he was murdered, and has yet to be solved. Ramos carries his father's hat with him at all times as he competes in The Ultimate Fighter.
- Ramos' opponent this week is Team Gastelum fighter Wilmer Fernandez, who endured the death of his mother to liver cancer just three days before he left to do The Ultimate Fighter. Much like Ramos, Fernandez is competing in this tournament for a chance at a better life and as a way to honor his fallen parent.
- Vernon Ramos defeated Wilmer Fernandez via decision (unanimous) after three rounds.
- The semifinal match-ups are hand-picked by Dana White:

Welterweight fights: Enrique Marín vs. Hector Aldana, and Erick Montaño vs. Vernon Ramos.
Lightweight fights: Cesar Arzamendia vs. Enrique Barzola, and Horacio Gutiérrez vs. Polo Reyes.

- White announces the next welterweight fight: Enrique Marín vs. Hector Aldana.

Episode 9: (October 21, 2015)

- Team Escudero decided to use their down time to get a few more pranks going, and the setup was rather elaborate as they targeted the coaches, including head coach Efrain Escudero. The plot involved putting on a “play” for the coaches at the house, but the fighters opted to make this a much more realistic portrayal of a famous battle when they surprised Escudero and his assistants with a full-on assault, including buckets of ice water and water balloons. For the second time this season, The Ultimate Fighter house got doused in water as the fighters and coaches from Team Escudero chased each other around with balloons and buckets.
- Following the water fight at the house, it was time for Enrique Marín and Hector Aldana to get ready for the fight as the two roommates set friendship aside to face off in the Octagon. Marín stated in the lead up to the fight that he felt like he was the better, more technical of the two but he still needed to be composed or risk getting drawn into a brawl with his Mexican opponent.
- Enrique Marín defeated Hector Aldana via submission (rear-naked choke) in the first round.
- White announces the next lightweight fight: Horacio Gutiérrez vs. Polo Reyes.

Episode 10: (October 28, 2015)

- As this week's fighters, (Team Escudero teammates) Horacio Gutiérrez and Marco Polo Reyes got into the final hours of training before weighing in and facing off, Ultimate Fighter season one winner Diego Sanchez paid a visit to the gym to meet the competitors from Team Escudero and walk them through a few training techniques. Sanchez is a legend from the first season of the show and he's faced a who's who list of fighters during a UFC career that's spanned the last decade, and this was his chance to give back to the next generation of Ultimate Fighters. Several of the fighters on the show weren't even in high school by the time Sanchez was wrapping up his Ultimate Fighter title, so it was a real treat for them to train with an iconic figure of the mixed martial arts scene.
- After the visit from Sanchez, the fighters also got the chance to escape the house this week and ride dune buggies all over the desert in Las Vegas. The trip to the desert was the perfect escape for everyone to unwind, although it was clear that both Gutiérrez and Reyes were more focused on what was going down between the two of them in just a matter of hours.
- Horacio Gutiérrez defeated Polo Reyes via TKO (punches) in the first round.
- White announces the final welterweight semifinal: Erick Montaño vs. Vernon Ramos.

Episode 11: (November 4, 2015)

- The monotony of living in the house with no contact with the outside world has started to make more than a few of the fighters a little stir crazy, and it's impossible for those feelings not to affect both Montaño and Ramos as they get ready for their fight this week. In past seasons, some of the competitors who are the last to perform on the show find that it's tough to get great training or even accessible training partners to help them push the pace for weight cuts and last minute touches before a fight.
- Former Ultimate Fighter season one winner Diego Sanchez returned, this time lending his support to Team Gastelum. Sanchez was a welcome addition to the training sessions for Escudero's squad and it's the same for Gastelum, as the veteran UFC fighter helped pass along a few tips both inside and outside the cage for the young group of hopefuls that look to join him in the Octagon one day.
- Erick Montaño defeated Vernon Ramos via submission (rear-naked choke) in the first round.
- White announces the final lightweight semifinal: Cesar Arzamendia vs. Enrique Barzola.

Episode 12: (November 11, 2015)

- Former lightweight champion Benson Henderson stopped by for a day of training at the request of his teammate Efrain Escudero. Henderson is not only one of the best fighters in the world while competing at both 155 and 170 pounds, but he's become a real team leader at his home gym in Arizona, the MMA Lab. Henderson brought some of those leadership skills to Team Escudero this week while sparring with some of the guys as well. At one point, Henderson was doing some mat work with Álvaro Herrera and he tagged him with a body shot while sparring on the ground. It wasn't the hardest punch in the world and Henderson wasn't going full strength, but the short shot stunned Herrera and left him moaning on the mat, unable to get up for a few minutes. He recovered and continued training, but Henderson's shot showed just how effective a punch to the body can be when it's perfectly placed, no matter how hard it's thrown. Henderson reminded the fighters that learning in the gym is never easy, but those hard lessons will prepare them for the war ahead when they actually step into the Octagon.
- It was an emotional goodbye for several of the fighters, including Wilmer Fernandez, who was brought to tears as he says a heartfelt goodbye to a group of guys he considers family now. The same can be said for Arzamendia, who thanks everyone for their help getting him ready and for the friendship they've all forged over the last six weeks. Finally, it's Kelvin Gastelum's turn, as the head coach even turns on the waterworks as he prepares his last fighter for battle this season before saying farewell to everybody. The emotional outpouring continues back at the house as well when Escudero and his staff bring over a last dinner for everyone on their team to share. It's filled with a few more laughs than the goodbye meeting at Team Gastelum, but in the end, the sentiment is the same as these eight fighters went from strangers to brothers while living and training together for the last month and a half.
- Enrique Barzola defeated Cesar Arzamendia via submission (punch to body) in the first round.

== Tournament Bracket ==
=== Lightweight Bracket ===
Elimination Round
Cesar Arzamendia	TKO
Oliver Meza	1
Jonathan Ortega	3
Enrique Barzola	UD
Danny Salas	3
Horacio Gutiérrez	MD
Christhian Soto	2
Marco Polo Reyes	TKO

Semi-finals
Cesar Arzamendia	1
Enrique Barzola	SUB
Horacio Gutiérrez	TKO
Marco Polo Reyes	1

Finale
Enrique Barzola	UD
Horacio Gutiérrez	3

=== Welterweight Bracket ===
Elimination Round
Enrique Marín	MD
Kevin Medinilla	2
Hector Aldana	UD
Álvaro Herrera	2
Erick Montaño	TKO
Marco Olano	1
Wilmer Fernández	3
Vernon Ramos	UD

Semi-finals
Enrique Marín	SUB
Hector Aldana	1
Erick Montaño	SUB
Vernon Ramos	1

Finale
Enrique Marín	3
Erick Montaño	SD

Legend
	Team Gastelum
	Team Escudero
UD	Unanimous Decision
MD	Majority Decision
SD	Split Decision
SUB	Submission
(T)KO	(Technical) Knock Out

== The Ultimate Fighter Latin America 2 Finale: Magny vs. Gastelum ==
The Ultimate Fighter Latin America 2 Finale: Magny vs. Gastelum
- The poster for The Ultimate Fighter Latin America 2 Finale: Magny vs. Gastelum
- Promotion: Ultimate Fighting Championship
- Date: November 21, 2015
- Venue: Arena Monterrey
- City: Monterrey, Mexico
- Attendance: 10,410

Event chronology
UFC 193: Rousey vs. Holm	The Ultimate Fighter Latin America 2 Finale: Magny vs. Gastelum	UFC Fight Night: Henderson vs. Masvidal

The Ultimate Fighter Latin America 2 Finale: Magny vs. Gastelum (also known as UFC Fight Night 78) was a mixed martial arts event held on November 21, 2015, at the Arena Monterrey in Monterrey, Mexico.

=== Background ===
The lightweight and welterweight finals of The Ultimate Fighter: Latin America 2 took place at the event.

A welterweight bout between Matt Brown and Kelvin Gastelum was expected to serve as the event headliner. However, on November 2, Brown withdrew from the fight due to an ankle injury suffered in training. He was replaced by Neil Magny

Damian Stasiak was expected to face Erik Pérez at this event. However, Stasiak was removed from the bout and was replaced by Taylor Lapilus.

=== Results ===
Main Card (Fox Sports 1)
Weight class				Method	Round	Time	Notes
Welterweight	Neil Magny	def.	Kelvin Gastelum	Decision (split) (47–48, 48–47, 48–47)	5	5:00
Featherweight	Ricardo Lamas	def.	Diego Sanchez	Decision (unanimous) (30–27, 30–27, 30–27)	3	5:00
Flyweight	Henry Cejudo	def.	Jussier Formiga	Decision (split) (30–27, 28–29, 30–27)	3	5:00
Welterweight	Erick Montaño	def.	Enrique Marín	Decision (split) (28–29, 29–28, 29–28)	3	5:00	(Note: The Ultimate Fighter: Latin America 2 Welterweight Final)
Lightweight	Enrique Barzola	def.	Horacio Gutiérrez	Decision (unanimous) (30–27, 30–27, 30–26)	3	5:00	(Note: The Ultimate Fighter: Latin America 2 Lightweight Final)
Lightweight	Leandro Silva	def.	Efraín Escudero	Decision (unanimous) (29–28, 29–28, 29–28)	3	5:00
Preliminary Card (Fox Sports 1)
Bantamweight	Erik Pérez	def.	Taylor Lapilus	Decision (unanimous) (29–28, 29–28, 29–28)	3	5:00
Welterweight	Bartosz Fabiński	def.	Héctor Urbina	Decision (unanimous) (29–28, 30–27, 30–27)	3	5:00
Bantamweight	Alejandro Pérez	def.	Scott Jorgensen	TKO (ankle injury)	2	4:26
Featherweight	Andre Fili	def.	Gabriel Benítez	KO (head kick and punches)	1	3:13
Preliminary Card (UFC Fight Pass)
Welterweight	Álvaro Herrera	def.	Vernon Ramos	TKO (punches)	1	0:30
Lightweight	Polo Reyes	def.	Cesar Arzamendia	KO (punch)	1	3:42
Lightweight	Michel Prazeres	def.	Valmir Lázaro	Decision (split) (29–28, 28–29, 29–28)	3	5:00

=== Bonus awards ===
The following fighters were awarded $50,000 bonuses:

- Fight of the Night: Neil Magny vs. Kelvin Gastelum
- Performance of the Night: Andre Fili and Polo Reyes

== See also ==
- The Ultimate Fighter
- List of UFC events
- 2015 in UFC
