= Jordan Rinaldi =

American MMA fighter (born 1987)

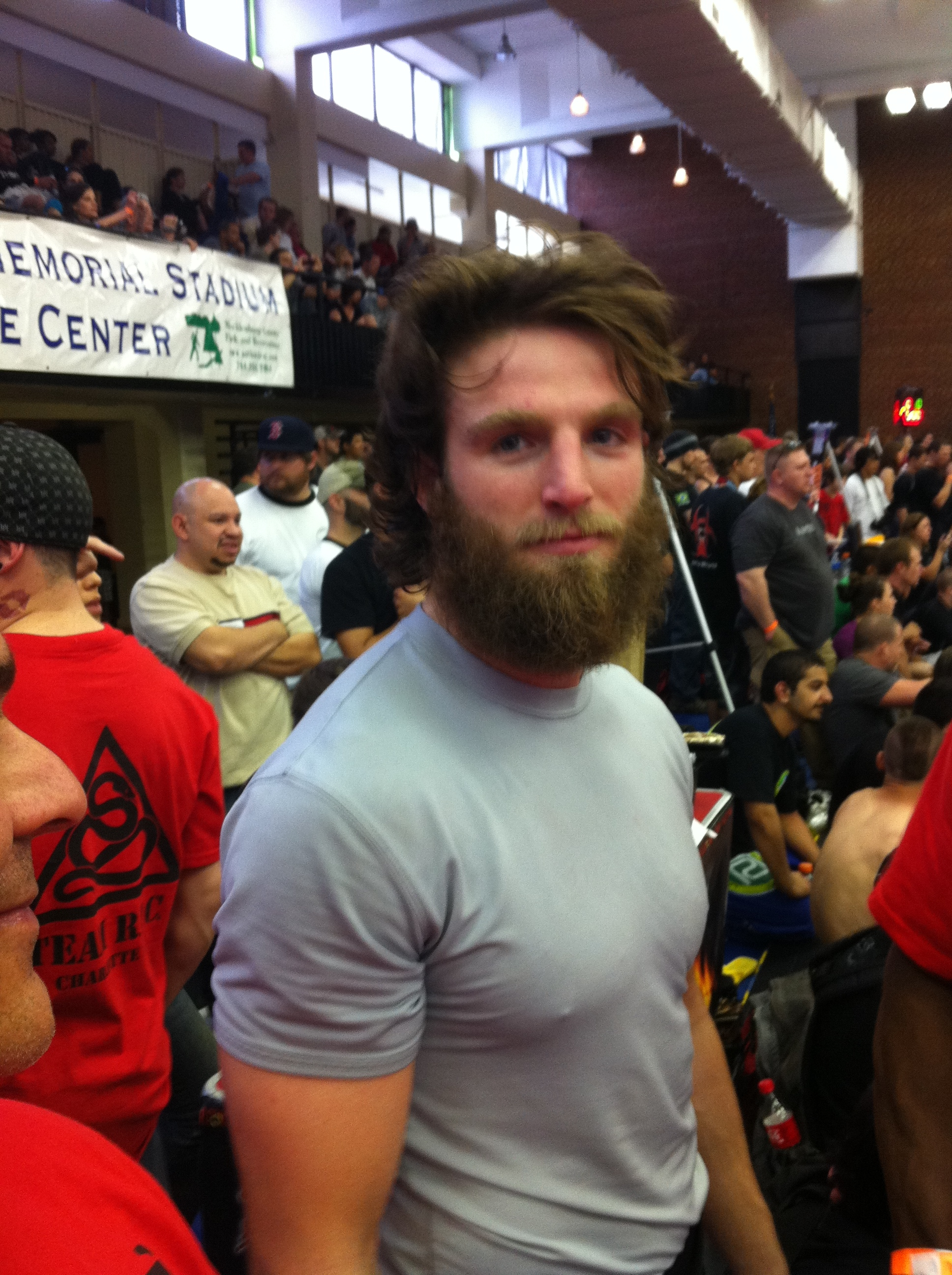
- Rinaldi in 2011
- Born: Jordan Lucas Rinaldi; September 25, 1987 (age 39); Olean, New York, U.S.
- Other names: All Day
- Nationality: American
- Height: 5 ft 10 in (1.78 m)
- Weight: 155.0 lb (70.3 kg; 11.07 st)
- Division: Welterweight; Lightweight; Featherweight
- Reach: 72 in (183 cm)
- Fighting out of: Las Vegas, Nevada, U.S.
- Team: One Kick's Gym; Sergio Penha BJJ; Team R.O.C
- Teacher: Sergio Penha - BJJ
- Rank: Black belt in Brazilian Jiu-Jitsu under Roan Carneiro
- Years active: 2010–2019

Mixed martial arts record
- Total: 21
- Wins: 14
- By knockout: 1
- By submission: 8
- By decision: 5
- Losses: 7
- By knockout: 2
- By submission: 1
- By decision: 4

Other information
- Occupation: Professional MMA fighter Car Inspector
- University: University of North Carolina at Charlotte
- Mixed martial arts record from Sherdog

Jordan Rinaldi (born September 25, 1987) is an American mixed martial artist. He was the welterweight Complete Devastation champion. Rinaldi competed in featherweight division of the Ultimate Fighting Championship (UFC).

== Background ==
Rinaldi was born in Olean, New York. His family would later move to Charlotte, North Carolina, where Rinaldi grew up with his two older brothers and three stepsisters. He graduated from David W. Butler High School in nearby Matthews, North Carolina. Even though he played baseball and football at a young age, as a late bloomer with only a 93-pound body weight frame, he followed his brother and started wrestling during his freshman year in high school. Rinaldi attended the University of North Carolina at Charlotte after high school and worked at a car wash station part-time. His coworker at the car wash, who was a BJJ practitioner, introduced him to BJJ and since then he has transitioned from wrestling to MMA.

== Mixed martial arts career ==
=== Early career ===
Rinaldi fought in a number of promotions including World Series of Fighting (WSOF) and Resurrection Fighting Alliance (RFA) during his early MMA career. He picked up eight stoppages in 12 professional career wins since his 2010 debut, noticeably held wins over former UFC veterans Dennis Bermudez, Diego Saraiva and Clay Harvison. He held a 5 fight winning streak prior to signing with the UFC. Rinaldi competed for the featherweight title for Resurrection Fighting Alliance (now known as Legacy Fighting Alliance) in 2012 and lost the fight to Jared Downing. He was the former Welterweight champion for Complete Devastation promotion where he submitted Tenyeh Dixon who missed the welterweight upper limit of 22 lbs on that fight.

=== The Ultimate Fighter ===
Rinaldi was one of the contestants for the UFC TV MMA fighting competition, The Ultimate Fighter 15 (TUF 15) also known as The Ultimate Fighter: Live in 2012. He faced Joe Proctor during the entry round and lost the fight via submission on round 1 and failed to be accepted into the TUF house.

=== Ultimate Fighting Championship ===
Rinaldi made his promotional debut as a short notice replacement, filling in for Carlos Diego Ferreira who was pulled out from the fight due to a potential USADA violation, against Abel Trujillo on May 29, 2017, at UFC Fight Night: Almeida vs. Garbrandt. He lost the fight via unanimous decision.

Rinaldi next faced Álvaro Herrera on August 5, 2017, at UFC Fight Night: Pettis vs. Moreno. He won this fight via submission (Von Flue choke) in round one. The submission victory was Rinaldi's first in the UFC. He is also the fourth fighter in UFC history to have defeated an opponent with a Von Flue Choke submission.

Rinaldi faced Gregor Gillespie on January 27, 2018, at UFC on Fox: Jacaré vs. Brunson 2. He lost the fight via TKO in the first round.

Rinaldi faced Jason Knight on November 3, 2018, at UFC 230. He won the fight via unanimous decision.

Rinaldi faced Arnold Allen on March 16, 2019, at UFC Fight Night 147. He lost the fight by unanimous decision.

On May 16, 2019, it was reported that Rinaldi was released by the UFC.

== Championships and accomplishments ==
=== Mixed martial arts ===
- Complete Devastation
  - Complete Devastation Welterweight Champion (One time) vs. Tenyeh Dixon

== Personal life ==
Rinaldi works as a corporate financial analyst and he earned his BS in Accounting and BSBA in Finance degrees from University of North Carolina at Charlotte.

== Mixed martial arts record ==
Professional record breakdown
21 matches	14 wins	7 losses
By knockout	1	2
By submission	8	1
By decision	5	4

Res.	Record	Opponent	Method	Event	Date	Round	Time	Location	Notes
Loss	14–7	Arnold Allen	Decision (unanimous)	UFC Fight Night: Till vs. Masvidal	March 16, 2019	3	5:00	London, England	
Win	14–6	Jason Knight	Decision (unanimous)	UFC 230	November 3, 2018	3	5:00	New York City, New York, United States	Return to Featherweight.
Loss	13–6	Gregor Gillespie	TKO (punches)	UFC on Fox: Jacaré vs. Brunson 2	January 27, 2018	1	4:46	Charlotte, North Carolina, United States	
Win	13–5	Álvaro Herrera	Submission (Von Flue choke)	UFC Fight Night: Pettis vs. Moreno	August 5, 2017	1	2:00	Mexico City, Mexico	
Loss	12–5	Abel Trujillo	Decision (unanimous)	UFC Fight Night: Almeida vs. Garbrandt	May 29, 2016	3	5:00	Las Vegas, Nevada, United States	
Win	12–4	Lashawn Alcocks	Submission (armbar)	Fight Lab 52	October 16, 2015	2	4:14	Charlotte, North Carolina, United States	
Win	11–4	Clay Harvison	Submission (rear-naked choke)	Legacy FC 47	October 16, 2015	2	4:31	Atlanta, Georgia, United States	
Win	10–4	Diego Saraiva	Decision (unanimous)	National Fighting Championship 75	June 27, 2015	3	5:00	Duluth, Georgia, United States	Featherweight bout.
Win	9–4	Soslan Abanokov	Submission (inverted triangle keylock)	WSOF 17	January 17, 2015	3	3:02	Las Vegas, Nevada, United States	Featherweight bout.
Win	8–4	Joe Elmore	Decision (unanimous)	US Freedom Fighting Championship 21	November 6, 2014	3	5:00	Morganton, North Carolina United States	
Loss	7–4	James Moontasri	KO (punch)	Resurrection Fighting Alliance 15	June 6, 2014	2	1:14	Culver City, California, United States	Catchweight (160 lbs) bout.
Win	7–3	Mike Stevens	TKO (punches)	Rings of Dreams: Fight Night 14	May 17, 2014	1	1:19	Winston-Salem, North Carolina, United States	Return to Lightweight.
Loss	6–3	Ronnie Rogers	Decision (split)	US Freedom Fighting Championship 15	December 6, 2013	3	5:00	Charlotte, North Carolina, United States	
Loss	6–2	Brian Ortega	Submission (triangle choke)	Resurrection Fighting Alliance 9	August 16, 2013	3	2:29	Los Angeles, California, United States	
Loss	6–1	Jared Downing	Decision (unanimous)	Resurrection Fighting Alliance 5	November 30, 2012	5	5:00	Kearney, Nebraska, United States	Featherweight debut. For the RFA Featherweight Championship.
Win	6–0	Mark Dickman	Decision (unanimous)	Resurrection Fighting Alliance 3	June 30, 2012	3	5:00	Kearney, Nebraska, United States	Catchweight (160 lbs) bout.
Win	5–0	Tenyeh Dixon	Submission (armbar)	Complete Devastation 2	November 12, 2011	2	4:6	Altoona Pennsylvania United States	Won the Complete Devastation Welterweight Championship.
Win	4–0	Dennis Bermudez	Submission (rear-naked choke)	PA Fighting Championships 4	November 20, 2010	1	2:13	Harrisburg, Pennsylvania, United States	
Win	3–0	Carlos Pena	Submission	Top Combat Championship 3	October 23, 2010	1	3:24	San Juan, Puerto Rico	
Win	2–0	Biff Walizer	Submission (rear-naked choke)	Premier Cage Fighting 3	September 18, 2010	1	2:42	Hamburg, Pennsylvania, United States	
Win	1–0	Joey Carroll	Decision (split)	Fight Lab Promotions: Epicentre Cage Fights 3	May 7, 2010	3	5:00	Charlotte, North Carolina, United States	

== See also ==
- List of current UFC fighters
- List of male mixed martial artists
