= BTC 9: Rampage =

- Promotion: BTC Fight Promotions
- Date: February 29, 2020
- Venue: The Kitchener Memorial Auditorium
- City: Kitchener, Ontario, Canada

BTC 9: Rampage is a mixed martial arts event produced by the BTC Fight Promotions that took place on February 29, 2020 at The Kitchener Memorial Auditorium (The Aud) in Kitchener, Ontario.

== Background ==
The card was headlined by former UFC fighter Jesse Ronson and "Dana White: Lookin' for a Fight" alum Troy Lamson.

The co-main event featured former BTC Lightweight champion Adam Assenza taking on UFC veteran Cody Pfister.

The fight card was originally set to be the promotional debut of Kitchener fighter Pat Pytlik.

== Fight card ==
Main card
Weight class				Method	Round	Time	Notes
Catchweight (160 lbs)	Jesse Ronson	def.	Troy Lamson	Submission (Rear-Naked Choke)	1	4:16
Lightweight	Adam Assenza	def.	Cody Pfister	Decision (Split)	3	5:00
Bantamweight	Mateo Vogel	def.	Serhiy Sidey	Decision (Unanimous)	3	5:00
Lightweight	Vladimir Kazbekov	def.	Eric Wilson	Decision (Unanimous)	3	5:00
Lightweight	Xavier Nash	def.	Kris Allard	Decision (Unanimous)	3	5:00
Preliminary Card
Welterweight	Kyran Cameron	def.	Rafael Palomeque	Submission (D'Arce Choke)	1	2:03
Super Lightweight	Zach Junkin	def.	Jamie Flick	KO (Punch)	1	0:26
Featherweight	Seth Connor	def.	Luke Hogg	Submission (D'Arce Choke)	1	2:22
