= Neace Robinson =

American singer and internet personality

- Origin: Louisiana, U.S.
- Genres: R&B, gospel
- Occupations: Singer; songwriter
- Years active: 2018–present

Neace Robinson, also known as the Funeral Stud, is an American singer and songwriter from Louisiana. She gained widespread attention in November 2025 when a video of her performing her 2018 song "I Wished That Heaven Had a Phone" at a balloon release ceremony in Jeanerette, Louisiana, went viral on TikTok.

== Background ==
Robinson wrote "I Wished That Heaven Had a Phone" after experiencing several losses, including the deaths of her mother, sister, and grandmother. She released it on December 2, 2018. Prior to going viral, Robinson was known locally in Louisiana for performing the song at funerals and memorial services, with a signature call-and-response where attendees release balloons on the line "1, 2, 1, 2, 3, release 'em".

== Career ==
On November 2, 2025, Robinson posted a video of a funeral performance to TikTok, which accumulated over 31.5 million views. The sound was used in over 78,000 TikTok posts, with the "1, 2, 3, release 'em" ad lib becoming a popular meme format—often used in videos joking about teachers releasing students for holiday break or issuing final grades. Billboard characterized the song as "R&B and gospel-infused" and called it "easily the most-consumed song of her recording career."

Robinson was in Texas when her nieces and nephews informed her of her sudden fame, texting her: "Tee Tee, you famous." The nickname "Funeral Stud" emerged from social media posts about the trend.

In December 2025, The Shade Room released an exclusive music video for the song. Robinson subsequently received record deal offers from multiple labels and reported interest from rapper Lil Baby. She announced plans for a national tour and an album titled Old Versus New.

In February 2026, it was announced that Robinson would be performing at Keith Lee's Familee Day in New Orleans, Louisiana, in May 2026.
