= Keith Lee =

Keith Lee may refer to:

- Keith Lee (American football) (born 1957), American football player
- Keith Lee (basketball) (born 1962), American basketball player
- Keith Lee (wrestler) (born 1984), American professional wrestler
- Keith-Lee Castle (born 1968), English actor
- Keith Lee (food critic) (born 1996), American food critic and mixed martial artist

== See also ==
- Keighley, a market town in West Yorkshire, England
