= UFC Fight Night: Henderson vs. Thatch =

UFC mixed martial arts event in 2015

- The poster for UFC Fight Night: Henderson vs. Thatch
- Promotion: Ultimate Fighting Championship
- Date: February 14, 2015
- Venue: 1stBank Center
- City: Broomfield, Colorado
- Attendance: 5,807
- Total gate: $382,875

Event chronology
UFC 183: Silva vs. Diaz	UFC Fight Night: Henderson vs. Thatch	UFC Fight Night: Bigfoot vs. Mir

UFC Fight Night: Henderson vs. Thatch (also known as UFC Fight Night 60) was a mixed martial arts event held on February 14, 2015, at the 1stBank Center in Broomfield, Colorado.

== Background ==
The event was the third that the UFC has hosted at the venue.

A welterweight bout between Matt Brown and Tarec Saffiedine was expected to serve as the event headliner. However, on January 1, the UFC announced that Saffiedine had pulled out of the bout, citing a groin injury he sustained in training. On January 13, Brown was pulled from the event in favor of a matchup with former UFC Welterweight champion Johny Hendricks at UFC 185. Subsequently, a welterweight bout between Stephen Thompson and Brandon Thatch was promoted to the main event. In turn, Thompson pulled out of the fight on January 30, citing a rib injury. After UFC 183, it was announced that former WEC & UFC Lightweight champion Benson Henderson agreed to step up as a replacement.

Jake Lindsey was scheduled to face James Moontasri at the event. However, on January 26, Lindsey pulled out of the bout citing injury and was replaced by promotional newcomer Cody Pfister.

Thiago Tavares was expected to face Nik Lentz at the event. However, in late January, Tavares pulled out of the bout citing injury and was replaced five days later by promotional newcomer Levan Makashvili. Subsequently, the pairing was scrapped just prior to the weigh-ins as Lentz was stricken with flu-like symptoms.

Both Patrick Walsh and James Moontasri missed weight on their first attempts at the weigh ins, coming in at 191.5 lb and 158 lb respectively. They were both given additional time to make the weight limits for their respective weight classes, but made no attempts to cut further. Instead, they were both fined 20 percent of their fight purses, which went to Dan Kelly and Cody Pfister respectively.

== Results ==
Main Card (Fox Sports 1)
Weight class				Method	Round	Time	Notes
Welterweight	Benson Henderson	def.	Brandon Thatch	Submission (rear-naked choke)	4	3:58
Featherweight	Max Holloway	def.	Cole Miller	Decision (unanimous) (29–28, 29–28, 30–27)	3	5:00
Welterweight	Neil Magny	def.	Kiichi Kunimoto	Submission (rear-naked choke)	3	1:22
Catchweight (191.5 lb)	Dan Kelly	def.	Patrick Walsh	Decision (unanimous) (29–28, 29–28, 30–27)	3	5:00
Lightweight	Kevin Lee	def.	Michel Prazeres	Decision (unanimous) (30–27, 29–28, 30–27)	3	5:00
Flyweight	Ray Borg	def.	Chris Kelades	Submission (kimura)	3	2:56
Preliminary Card (Fox Sports 1)
Lightweight	Efraín Escudero	def.	Rodrigo de Lima	Decision (unanimous) (30–27, 30–27, 30–27)	3	5:00
Featherweight	Chas Skelly	def.	Jim Alers	TKO (punches and knee)	2	4:59
Flyweight	Zach Makovsky	def.	Tim Elliott	Decision (unanimous) (29–28, 29–28, 29–28)	3	5:00
Catchweight (158 lb)	James Moontasri	def.	Cody Pfister	Submission (rear-naked choke)	2	1:49

== Bonus awards ==
The following fighters were awarded $50,000 bonuses:

- Fight of the Night: Benson Henderson vs. Brandon Thatch
- Performance of the Night: Neil Magny and Ray Borg

== See also ==
- List of UFC events
- 2015 in UFC
