= Kevin Lee =

American mixed martial artist (born 1992)

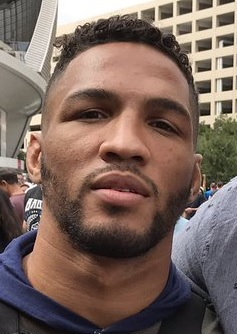
- Kevin Lee in 2018
- Born: Kevin Jeese Lee Jr. September 4, 1992 (age 34); Grand Rapids, Michigan, U.S.
- Nickname: The Motown Phenom
- Height: 5 ft 9 in (175 cm)
- Weight: 155 lb (70 kg; 11 st 1 lb)
- Division: Welterweight (2019, 2021–2023); Lightweight (2012–2018, 2019–2020, 2025-present); Super lightweight (2022)
- Reach: 77 in (196 cm)
- Stance: Orthodox
- Fighting out of: Las Vegas, Nevada, U.S.
- Team: Xtreme Couture (2012–2019); Tristar Gym (2019–present)
- Trainer: Dewey Cooper (2012–2023); Firas Zahabi (2019–2023)
- Rank: blue belt in Brazilian jiu-jitsu
- Wrestling: NCWA Wrestling
- Years active: 2012–2023, 2024-present

Mixed martial arts record
- Total: 29
- Wins: 20
- By knockout: 3
- By submission: 9
- By decision: 8
- Losses: 9
- By knockout: 2
- By submission: 4
- By decision: 3

Other information
- Website: kevinleemma.com
- Mixed martial arts record from Sherdog

Kevin Jeese Lee Jr. (born September 4, 1992) is an American professional mixed martial artist. He is currently signed to the Professional Fighters League (PFL), where he competes in the Lightweight division. He formerly competed in the Ultimate Fighting Championship (UFC) where he fought in the Lightweight and Welterweight divisions. He also once competed in Eagle Fighting Championship (EFC) as a Super Lightweight. In October 2017, he headlined the UFC 216 pay-per-view and competed for the interim UFC Lightweight Championship.

== Background ==
Lee was born in Grand Rapids, Michigan, on September 4, 1992, and raised in Detroit, Michigan. Lee has a sister and two younger brothers, one of whom is Keith, also a professional mixed martial artist previously signed to Bellator who trained with Kevin previously at Xtreme Couture and is currently with Tristar.

He competed in basketball growing up and began wrestling during his junior year at Southfield High School. Lee continued his wrestling career at Grand Valley State University, where he was a national tournament qualifier and went 37–0 as a sophomore. However, with two years left of wrestling eligibility at the school, Lee dropped out to focus on a career in mixed martial arts.

== Mixed martial arts career ==
=== 2014 ===
Lee made his promotional debut against Al Iaquinta on February 1, 2014, at UFC 169. He lost the fight via unanimous decision. After the loss, Lee moved from his native Michigan to Las Vegas, searching for improvements to his game.

At The Ultimate Fighter 19 Finale on July 6, 2014, Lee got his first win for the promotion when he defeated Jesse Ronson by split decision.

Lee faced Jon Tuck at UFC 178 on September 27, 2014. Lee won the fight via unanimous decision.

=== 2015 ===
Lee faced Michel Prazeres on February 14, 2015, at UFC Fight Night 60. Lee won the fight by unanimous decision.

Lee next faced James Moontasri on July 15, 2015, at UFC Fight Night 71. Lee won the fight via first round submission.

Lee faced Leonardo Santos on December 12, 2015, at UFC 194. Lee lost the fight via TKO in the first round.

=== 2016 ===
Lee next faced Efraín Escudero on April 23, 2016, at UFC 197. Lee won the fight via unanimous decision.

Lee next faced Jake Matthews on July 8, 2016, at The Ultimate Fighter 23 Finale. Lee won the fight via TKO in the first round.

Lee faced Magomed Mustafaev at UFC Fight Night 99 on November 19, 2016. He won the fight via submission in the second round. The win earned Lee his first Performance of the Night bonus award.

=== 2017 ===
Lee faced Francisco Trinaldo on March 11, 2017, at UFC Fight Night 106. After a back-and-forth first round, Lee won the fight via submission in the second round.

Lee faced Michael Chiesa on June 25, 2017, at UFC Fight Night 112. He won the fight via submission at the end of the first round. The win also earned Lee his second Performance of the Night bonus award. Chiesa appealed to the Oklahoma State Athletic Commission to overturn the defeat, claiming referee Mario Yamasaki erred both in stopping the fight despite no tapout nor loss of consciousness and in allowing Lee to use illegal downward elbows, which cut his head.

Lee fought Tony Ferguson on October 7, 2017, at UFC 216 for the interim UFC Lightweight Championship. Despite starting off strong, Lee lost the fight by submission in the third round.

=== 2018 ===
Lee fought Edson Barboza on April 21, 2018, at UFC Fight Night 128. At the weigh-ins, Lee weighed in at 157 pounds, one pound over the lightweight non-title fight upper limit of 156 pounds. As a result, the bout proceeded at catchweight and Lee was fined 20% of his purse which went to Barboza. Lee was rocked badly by a spinning heel kick, and was nearly finished by Barboza in the third round, but rallied back and defeated Barboza via TKO after the ringside doctor stopped the bout due to a cut suffered by Barboza in round five.

Lee faced Al Iaquinta in a rematch on December 15, 2018, at UFC on Fox 31. He lost the fight via unanimous decision.

=== 2019 ===
Lee moved up to welterweight to face Rafael dos Anjos in the main event of UFC on ESPN+ 10 on May 18, 2019. He lost the fight via an arm triangle submission in the fourth round.

In September 2019, Lee announced he would be returning to the lightweight division.

Lee faced undefeated prospect Gregor Gillespie on November 2, 2019, at UFC 244. Lee won the fight via knockout in the first round. This win earned him the Performance of the Night award.

=== 2020 ===
Lee faced Charles Oliveira on March 14, 2020, as the main event at UFC Fight Night 170. At the weigh-ins, Lee weighed in at 158.5 lbs, 2.5 lbs over the lightweight non-title fight limit of 156 pounds. Lee was fined 20% of his purse and his bout with Oliveira was expected to proceed as scheduled at a catchweight. Lee lost the fight via submission with a guillotine choke in the third round.

=== 2021 ===
Lee was scheduled to face Sean Brady on July 10, 2021, at UFC 264. However, Lee withdrew due to injury and the bout was rescheduled to UFC on ESPN 30 on August 28, 2021. Subsequently, the bout was yet again canceled after Brady withdrew due to a foot infection. Brady was replaced by Daniel Rodriguez on August 28, 2021, at UFC on ESPN 30. On his return to welterweight, Lee lost the fight via unanimous decision. Subsequently, Lee tested positive for Adderall and was suspended for six months, making him eligible to return into competition on February 28, 2022. In an interview, Lee stated that he thought the drug would be out of his system soon enough, which is why he didn't apply for therapeutic-use exemption regarding his medication for recently diagnosed ADHD.

On November 30, 2021, it was announced that Lee was released from the UFC.

=== Eagle Fighting Championship ===
On December 15, 2021, it was announced that Lee signed a four-fight contract with Eagle FC.

Lee made his debut against Diego Sanchez in a 165 lbs bout on March 11, 2022, at Eagle FC 46. He won the fight via unanimous decision.

=== Return to UFC ===
In early-February 2023, it was reported that Lee had re-signed with the UFC.

Lee made his promotional return against Rinat Fakhretdinov on July 1, 2023 at UFC on ESPN 48. He lost the fight via technical submission due to a guillotine choke within the opening minute.

On July 11, 2023, Lee announced that he was retiring from MMA. He expressed grievance with his MMA career by saying "it kind of sucks being famous but not being rich".

=== Return to MMA ===
Lee made his return to mixed martial arts on September 28, 2024, at Lights Out Championship 17 against Thiago Oliveira in a welterweight bout. He won the fight via a rear-naked choke submission in the first round.

Lee was scheduled to make his bare-knuckle debut against Saul Almeida on November 15, 2024 at Gamebred Bareknuckle MMA 8. However, the fight was ultimately canceled without explanation.

==== Global Fight League ====
On December 11, 2024, it was announced that Lee was signed by Global Fight League. However, in April 2025, it was reported that all GFL events were cancelled indefinitely.

==== Professional Fighters League ====
Stepping in as a replacement for Jay-Jay Wilson, Lee faced Gadzhi Rabadanov in the 2025 PFL Lightweight Tournament Semifinal on June 20, 2025, at PFL 6. He lost the fight via TKO in the first round.

== Professional grappling career ==
Lee was scheduled to face Chad Mendes at ADXC 5 on August 3, 2024. He withdrew from the match on short notice and was replaced by Diego Brandão.

== Personal life ==
Lee converted to Islam in October 2021. He has a son (born 2022). Lee endorsed Bernie Sanders in the 2020 presidential election, speaking at a rally for Sanders in Las Vegas in December 2019.

== Championships and accomplishments ==
- Total Warrior Combat
  - TWC Lightweight Championship (One time)
- Ultimate Fighting Championship
  - Performance of the Night (Three times) vs. Magomed Mustafaev, Michael Chiesa, and Gregor Gillespie
  - UFC.com Awards
    - 2019: Ranked #5 Knockout of the Year vs. Gregor Gillespie

== Mixed martial arts record ==
Professional record breakdown
29 matches	20 wins	9 losses
By knockout	3	2
By submission	9	4
By decision	8	3

Res.	Record	Opponent	Method	Event	Date	Round	Time	Location	Notes
Loss	20–9	Gadzhi Rabadanov	TKO (punches)	PFL 6 (2025)	June 20, 2025	1	2:37	Wichita, Kansas, United States	Return to Lightweight. 2025 PFL Lightweight Tournament Semifinal.
Win	20–8	Thiago Oliveira	Submission (rear-naked choke)	Lights Out Championship 17	September 28, 2024	1	1:58	Wayne, Michigan, United States	
Loss	19–8	Rinat Fakhretdinov	Technical Submission (guillotine choke)	UFC on ESPN: Strickland vs. Magomedov	July 1, 2023	1	0:55	Las Vegas, Nevada, United States	
Win	19–7	Diego Sanchez	Decision (unanimous)	Eagle FC 46	March 11, 2022	3	5:00	Miami, Florida, United States	Super Lightweight (165 lb) bout.
Loss	18–7	Daniel Rodriguez	Decision (unanimous)	UFC on ESPN: Barboza vs. Chikadze	August 28, 2021	3	5:00	Las Vegas, Nevada, United States	Return to Welterweight. Lee tested positive for adderall.
Loss	18–6	Charles Oliveira	Submission (guillotine choke)	UFC Fight Night: Lee vs. Oliveira	March 14, 2020	3	0:28	Brasília, Brazil	Catchweight (158.5 lb) bout; Lee missed weight.
Win	18–5	Gregor Gillespie	KO (head kick)	UFC 244	November 2, 2019	1	2:47	New York City, New York, United States	Return to Lightweight. Performance of the Night.
Loss	17–5	Rafael dos Anjos	Submission (arm-triangle choke)	UFC Fight Night: dos Anjos vs. Lee	May 18, 2019	4	3:47	Rochester, New York, United States	Welterweight debut.
Loss	17–4	Al Iaquinta	Decision (unanimous)	UFC on Fox: Lee vs. Iaquinta 2	December 15, 2018	5	5:00	Milwaukee, Wisconsin, United States	
Win	17–3	Edson Barboza	TKO (doctor stoppage)	UFC Fight Night: Barboza vs. Lee	April 21, 2018	5	2:18	Atlantic City, New Jersey, United States	Catchweight (157 lb) bout; Lee missed weight.
Loss	16–3	Tony Ferguson	Submission (triangle choke)	UFC 216	October 7, 2017	3	4:02	Las Vegas, Nevada, United States	For the interim UFC Lightweight Championship.
Win	16–2	Michael Chiesa	Technical Submission (rear-naked choke)	UFC Fight Night: Chiesa vs. Lee	June 25, 2017	1	4:37	Oklahoma City, Oklahoma, United States	Performance of the Night.
Win	15–2	Francisco Trinaldo	Submission (rear-naked choke)	UFC Fight Night: Belfort vs. Gastelum	March 11, 2017	2	3:12	Fortaleza, Brazil	
Win	14–2	Magomed Mustafaev	Technical Submission (rear-naked choke)	UFC Fight Night: Mousasi vs. Hall 2	November 19, 2016	2	4:31	Belfast, Northern Ireland	Performance of the Night.
Win	13–2	Jake Matthews	TKO (punches)	The Ultimate Fighter: Team Joanna vs. Team Cláudia Finale	July 8, 2016	1	4:06	Las Vegas, Nevada, United States	
Win	12–2	Efraín Escudero	Decision (unanimous)	UFC 197	April 23, 2016	3	5:00	Las Vegas, Nevada, United States	
Loss	11–2	Leonardo Santos	TKO (punches)	UFC 194	December 12, 2015	1	3:26	Las Vegas, Nevada, United States	
Win	11–1	James Moontasri	Submission (rear-naked choke)	UFC Fight Night: Mir vs. Duffee	July 15, 2015	1	2:56	San Diego, California, United States	
Win	10–1	Michel Prazeres	Decision (unanimous)	UFC Fight Night: Henderson vs. Thatch	February 14, 2015	3	5:00	Broomfield, Colorado, United States	
Win	9–1	Jon Tuck	Decision (unanimous)	UFC 178	September 27, 2014	3	5:00	Las Vegas, Nevada, United States	Tuck was deducted one point in round 2 due to a groin kick.
Win	8–1	Jesse Ronson	Decision (split)	The Ultimate Fighter: Team Edgar vs. Team Penn Finale	July 6, 2014	3	5:00	Las Vegas, Nevada, United States	
Loss	7–1	Al Iaquinta	Decision (unanimous)	UFC 169	February 1, 2014	3	5:00	Newark, New Jersey, United States	
Win	7–0	Eric Moon	Submission (guillotine choke)	Total Warrior Combat 20	November 16, 2013	1	1:24	Lansing, Michigan, United States	Won the TWC Lightweight Championship.
Win	6–0	Travis Gervais	Submission (armbar)	Canadian FC 8	September 13, 2013	1	0:46	Winnipeg, Manitoba, Canada	Catchweight (160 lb) bout.
Win	5–0	Joseph Lile	Submission (rear-naked choke)	Midwest Fight Series 5	July 19, 2013	3	1:29	Indianapolis, Indiana, United States	Catchweight (157 lb) bout; Lee missed weight.
Win	4–0	Kyle Prepolec	Submission (guillotine choke)	Michiana Fight League 29	April 13, 2013	2	2:17	South Bend, Indiana, United States	Catchweight (158 lb) bout; both fighters missed weight.
Win	3–0	J. P. Reese	Decision (unanimous)	Impact Fight League 51	November 17, 2012	3	5:00	Auburn Hills, Michigan, United States	
Win	2–0	Mansour Barnaoui	Decision (unanimous)	Instinct MMA: Instinct Fighting 4	June 29, 2012	3	5:00	Montreal, Quebec, Canada	
Win	1–0	Levis Labrie	Decision (unanimous)	Instinct MMA: Instinct Fighting 3	March 31, 2012	3	5:00	Sherbrooke, Quebec, Canada	Lightweight debut.

== Pay-per-view bouts ==
No	Event	Fight	Date	Venue	City	PPV buys
1.	UFC 216	Ferguson vs. Lee	October 7, 2017	T-Mobile Arena	Paradise, Nevada, United States	200,000

== See also ==
- List of male mixed martial artists
