= Gregor Gillespie =

American mixed martial artist (born 1987)

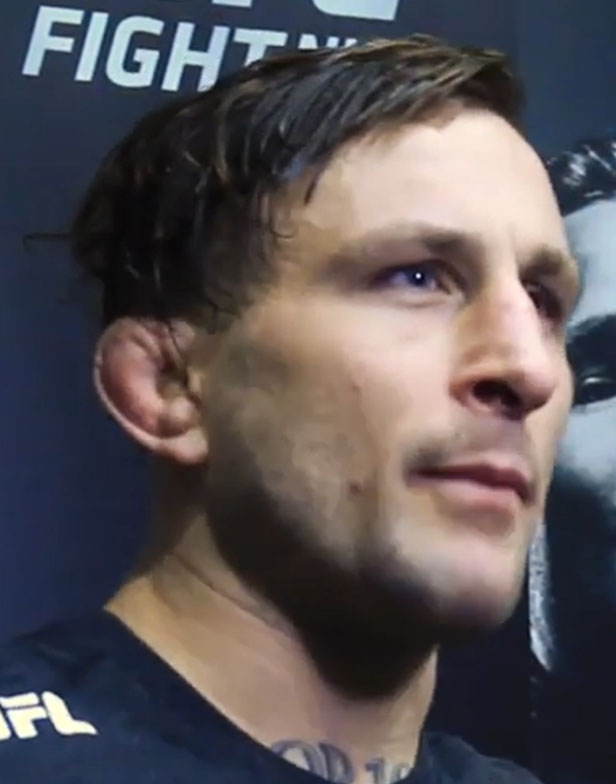
- Gregor Gillespie at UFC Fight Night 143
- Born: November 13, 1987 (age 38); Webster, New York, U.S.
- Other names: The Gift
- Height: 5 ft 7 in (1.70 m)
- Weight: 155 lb (70 kg; 11.1 st)
- Division: Lightweight
- Reach: 71 in (180 cm)
- Style: Wrestling
- Stance: Orthodox
- Fighting out of: Long Island, New York, U.S.
- Team: Long Island MMA; Bellmore Kickboxing Academy
- Rank: Blue belt in Brazilian Jiu-Jitsu under Joe Scarola and Carlos Rosado
- Wrestling: NCAA Division I Wrestling
- Years active: 2012–present

Mixed martial arts record
- Total: 15
- Wins: 14
- By knockout: 7
- By submission: 5
- By decision: 2
- Losses: 1
- By knockout: 1

Other information
- Mixed martial arts record from Sherdog

Gregor Gillespie (born November 13, 1987) is a former American professional mixed martial artist and graduated collegiate wrestler who competed in the lightweight division of the Ultimate Fighting Championship (UFC). A professional since 2012, he formerly competed for Ring of Combat where he was the Lightweight Champion.

As a folkstyle wrestler, Gillespie was the 2007 NCAA Division I National Champion at 149 pounds, a four–time NCAA Division I All–American and a three–time EWL and PSAC conference champion for the Edinboro Fighting Scots. He also competed briefly in freestyle wrestling.

== Background ==
Born and raised in Webster, New York, Gillespie attended Webster Schroeder High School where he was a standout in wrestling, winning two NYSPHSAA state titles.

He continued wrestling for Edinboro University, where he was a four-time NCAA Division I All-American and won a national championship in 2007. He was the first true freshman All-American in school history, and also holds the school record for most career wins (152), most wins as a freshman (40), and highest winning percentage (.917).

Gillespie graduated from Edinboro with a bachelor's degree in individualized studies and a concentration in psychology. He was an assistant coach at Hofstra University and as a side gig, taught private lessons to an MMA fighter. Despite having vowed never to fight, he started studying MMA and quit his job in order to pursue a full-time career in the sport.

== Mixed martial arts ==
=== Early career ===
In 2012, Gillespie was scheduled to make his mixed martial arts debut but suffered a broken arm during a sparring session which caused serious health issues and infections, pushing his debut over to January 2014. After compiling an undefeated 7–0 record with six finishes on the regional scene in New Jersey, Gillespie signed a contract with the Ultimate Fighting Championship.

=== Ultimate Fighting Championship ===
Gillespie made his promotional debut against Glaico Franca on September 24, 2016, at UFC Fight Night 95. He won the fight via unanimous decision.

Gillespie next faced Andrew Holbrook on April 8, 2017, at UFC 210. He won the fight via knockout in the first round and was awarded a Performance of the Night bonus.

Gillespie faced Jason Gonzalez on September 16, 2017, at UFC Fight Night 116. He won the back-and-forth fight via submission in the second round. The win also earned Gillespie his first Fight of the Night bonus award.

Gillespie faced Jordan Rinaldi on January 27, 2018, at UFC on Fox: Jacaré vs. Brunson 2. He won the fight via technical knock out.

Gillespie faced Vinc Pichel on June 1, 2018, at UFC Fight Night 131. Gillespie won via arm-triangle choke in the second round. This win earned him Performance of the Night award.

Gillespie faced Yancy Medeiros on January 19, 2019, at UFC Fight Night: Cejudo vs. Dillashaw. He won the fight via TKO in the second round.

Gillespie faced Kevin Lee on November 2, 2019, at UFC 244. He lost the fight via knockout in round one, marking his first professional defeat.

Gillespie was expected to face Brad Riddell on March 20, 2021, at UFC on ESPN 21. However, the bout was cancelled due to COVID-19 protocols in the day of the event. Instead, Gillespie faced No-Gi Jiu Jitsu World medalist Carlos Diego Ferreira on May 8, 2021, at UFC on ESPN 24. At the weigh–ins, Ferreira weighed in at 160.5 pounds, four and a half pounds over the lightweight non-title fight limit and was fined 30% of his purse, which went to Gillespie. After a back-and-forth first round, where Gillespie appeared to fatigue, he was able to keep composure and rallied, winning the fight via TKO in round two. This fight earned him the Fight of the Night award.

In May 2022, it was reported that Gillespie was removed from UFC roster. After the report, Gillespie posted on social media that he had wanted to fight above the rankings and that many bouts failed to come together.

== Championships and accomplishments ==
=== Mixed martial arts ===
- Ring of Combat
  - ROC Regional Lightweight Championship (One time)
- Ultimate Fighting Championship
  - Fight of the Night (Two times) vs. Jason Gonzalez and Carlos Diego Ferreira
  - Performance of the Night (Two times) vs. Andrew Holbrook and Vinc Pichel

=== Folkstyle wrestling ===
- National Collegiate Athletic Association
  - NCAA Division I 149 lbs - 7th place out of Edinboro University (2006)
  - NCAA Division I 149 lbs - 1st place out of Edinboro University (2007)
  - NCAA Division I 157 lbs - 5th place out of Edinboro University (2008)
  - NCAA Division I 157 lbs - 4th place out of Edinboro University (2009)

== Mixed martial arts record ==
Professional record breakdown
15 matches	14 wins	1 loss
By knockout	7	1
By submission	5	0
By decision	2	0

Res.	Record	Opponent	Method	Event	Date	Round	Time	Location	Notes
Win	14–1	Carlos Diego Ferreira	TKO (elbows and punches)	UFC on ESPN: Rodriguez vs. Waterson	May 8, 2021	2	4:51	Las Vegas, Nevada, United States	Catchweight (160.5 lb) bout; Ferreira missed weight. Fight of the Night.
Loss	13–1	Kevin Lee	KO (head kick)	UFC 244	November 2, 2019	1	2:47	New York City, New York, United States	
Win	13–0	Yancy Medeiros	TKO (punches)	UFC Fight Night: Cejudo vs. Dillashaw	January 19, 2019	2	4:59	Brooklyn, New York, United States	
Win	12–0	Vinc Pichel	Submission (arm-triangle choke)	UFC Fight Night: Rivera vs. Moraes	June 1, 2018	2	4:06	Utica, New York, United States	Performance of the Night.
Win	11–0	Jordan Rinaldi	TKO (punches)	UFC on Fox: Jacaré vs. Brunson 2	January 27, 2018	1	4:46	Charlotte, North Carolina, United States	
Win	10–0	Jason Gonzalez	Submission (arm-triangle choke)	UFC Fight Night: Rockhold vs. Branch	September 16, 2017	2	2:10	Pittsburgh, Pennsylvania, United States	Fight of the Night.
Win	9–0	Andrew Holbrook	KO (punches)	UFC 210	April 8, 2017	1	0:21	Buffalo, New York, United States	Performance of the Night.
Win	8–0	Glaico França	Decision (unanimous)	UFC Fight Night: Cyborg vs. Lansberg	September 24, 2016	3	5:00	Brasília, Brazil	
Win	7–0	Sidney Outlaw	Decision (split)	Ring of Combat 55	June 3, 2016	3	5:00	Atlantic City, New Jersey, United States	Defended the ROC Regional Lightweight Championship.
Win	6–0	Jose Mariscal	TKO (punches)	Ring of Combat 54	March 4, 2016	1	4:09	Atlantic City, New Jersey, United States	Defended the ROC Regional Lightweight Championship.
Win	5–0	George Sheppard	Submission (arm-triangle choke)	Ring of Combat 51	June 5, 2015	1	3:45	Atlantic City, New Jersey, United States	Won the vacant ROC Regional Lightweight Championship.
Win	4–0	Justin Stewart	TKO (punches)	Ring of Combat 50	January 23, 2015	1	2:51	Atlantic City, New Jersey, United States	
Win	3–0	Justin Harrington	Submission (arm-triangle choke)	Ring of Combat 49	September 19, 2014	1	3:21	Atlantic City, New Jersey, United States	
Win	2–0	Brandon Priest	Submission (rear-naked choke)	Ring of Combat 48	May 16, 2014	2	2:37	Atlantic City, New Jersey, United States	
Win	1–0	Kenny Gaudreau	TKO (punches)	Ring of Combat 47	January 24, 2014	1	1:48	Atlantic City, New Jersey, United States	Lightweight debut.

== NCAA record ==
NCAA Championships Matches
Res.	Record	Opponent	Score	Date	Event
2009 NCAA Championships 4th at 157 lbs
Loss	19–6	Jordan Leen	0–4	March 19–21, 2009	2009 NCAA Division I Wrestling Championships
Win	19–5	Michael Chandler	MD 10–2	March 19–21, 2009	2009 NCAA Division I Wrestling Championships
Loss	18–5	Jordan Burroughs	MD 4–12	March 19–21, 2009	2009 NCAA Division I Wrestling Championships
Win	18–4	J.P O’Connor	1–0	March 19–21, 2009	2009 NCAA Division I Wrestling Championships
Win	17–4	Jason Welch	3–2	March 19–21, 2009	2009 NCAA Division I Wrestling Championships
Win	16–4	Shane Smith	TF 16–0	March 19–21, 2009	2009 NCAA Division I Wrestling Championships
2008 NCAA Championships 5th at 157 lbs
Win	15–4	Josh Zupancic	TF 15–0	March 20–22, 2008	2008 NCAA Division I Wrestling Championships
Loss	14–4	Dan Vallimont	1–2	March 20–22, 2008	2008 NCAA Division I Wrestling Championships
Win	14–3	Cyler Sanderson	Fall	March 20–22, 2008	2008 NCAA Division I Wrestling Championships
Win	13–3	Matt Kocher	1–0	March 20–22, 2008	2008 NCAA Division I Wrestling Championships
Loss	12–3	Jordan Leen	6–8	March 20–22, 2008	2008 NCAA Division I Wrestling Championships
Win	12–2	Jason Johnstone	6–0	March 20–22, 2008	2008 NCAA Division I Wrestling Championships
Win	11–2	Spencer Maley	TF 17–0	March 20–22, 2008	2008 NCAA Division I Wrestling Championships
2007 NCAA Championships (gold) at 149 lbs
Win	10–2	Josh Churella	SV 3–1	March 15–17, 2007	2007 NCAA Division I Wrestling Championships
Win	9–2	Dustin Schlatter	3–2	March 15–17, 2007	2007 NCAA Division I Wrestling Championships
Win	8–2	Jordan Leen	6–2	March 15–17, 2007	2007 NCAA Division I Wrestling Championships
Win	7–2	Dan Vallimont	MD 10–2	March 15–17, 2007	2007 NCAA Division I Wrestling Championships
Win	6–2	Sam Alvarenga	9–5	March 15–17, 2007	2007 NCAA Division I Wrestling Championships
2006 NCAA Championships 7th at 149 lbs
Win	5–2	Mark DiSalvo	Fall	March 16–18, 2006	2006 NCAA Division I Wrestling Championships
Loss	4–2	Jon Masa	4–11	March 16–18, 2006	2006 NCAA Division I Wrestling Championships
Win	3–1	Patrick Simpson	8–1	March 16–18, 2006	2006 NCAA Division I Wrestling Championships
Loss	2–1	Ty Eustice	4–2	March 16–18, 2006	2006 NCAA Division I Wrestling Championships
Win	2–0	Keith Dickey	Fall	March 16–18, 2006	2006 NCAA Division I Wrestling Championships
Win	1–0	Trevor Chinn	Fall	March 16–18, 2006	2006 NCAA Division I Wrestling Championships

=== Stats ===
Season	Year	School	Placement	Weigh Class	Record	Win
2009	Senior	Edinboro University of Pennsylvania	4th	157	41–3	93.18%
2008	Junior	Edinboro University of Pennsylvania	5th	157	37–4	90.24%
2007	Sophomore	Edinboro University of Pennsylvania	1st	149	34–2	94.44%
2006	Freshman	Edinboro University of Pennsylvania	7th	149	40–4	90.91%
Career					152–13	92.12%

== See also ==
- List of male mixed martial artists
