= Andrew Holbrook =

American mixed martial arts fighter

- Born: February 6, 1986 (age 40); Adrian, Michigan, United States
- Height: 5 ft 11 in (1.80 m)
- Weight: 70 kg (154 lb; 11 st 0 lb)
- Division: Lightweight
- Reach: 70 in (178 cm)
- Style: Wrestling, Boxing, BJJ
- Fighting out of: Indianapolis, Indiana, United States
- Team: Indy Boxing & Grappling
- Teacher: Pat McPherson
- Rank: Blue belt in Brazilian Jiu-Jitsu
- Years active: 2010–present

Mixed martial arts record
- Total: 15
- Wins: 12
- By knockout: 1
- By submission: 9
- By decision: 2
- Losses: 3
- By knockout: 3

Other information
- Mixed martial arts record from Sherdog

Andrew Holbrook (born February 6, 1986) is an American mixed martial artist and the former Colosseum Combat lightweight champion. He competed in the Lightweight division of the Ultimate Fighting Championship.

== Background ==
Holbrook started wrestling and running track when he was in middle school in Adrian, Michigan. He believes that the mental toughness served an important factor in fighting which he was well-trained in this department by his middle school wrestling coach Jim Waters. He started training MMA after he had his hands in a few fights. Besides training at IBG in Indiana, he also has trained at Tiger Muay Thai in Phuket Island, Thailand.

== Mixed martial arts career ==
=== Early career ===
Holbrook fought in various regional MMA promotions, primarily in Indiana such as Absolute Cage Fighting, Midwest Fight Series, Colosseum Combat and Michiana Fight League prior to joining the UFC. He stepped in to replace an injured Joe Lile Jr. against Tyler Combs at the Colosseum Combat 32 lightweight title bout and won the fight via TKO and became Colosseum Combat lightweight champion.

=== Ultimate Fighting Championship ===
Holbrook amassed an undefeated record of 11 wins, 10 stoppages with nine of them by submission, prior to signing with the Ultimate Fighting Championship.

Holbrook made his promotional debut on short notice, as he was tabbed as an injury replacement for Erik Koch against Ramsey Nijem on July 25, 2015 at UFC on Fox: Dillashaw vs. Barão 2. Holbrook won the fight via split decision.

Holbrook was scheduled to face Sage Northcutt on January 30, 2016 at UFC on Fox 18. However, he was forced to pull out of the fight due to a foot injury and was replaced by Bryan Barberena.

Holbrook faced Joaquim Silva on July 8, 2016 at The Ultimate Fighter 23 Finale. He lost the fight via knockout in round one.

Holbrook next faced Jake Matthews on November 27, 2016 at UFC Fight Night: Whittaker vs. Brunson. He won the fight via split decision. He said in his post fight interview “[Beating Matthews] felt good. I was expecting to be an underdog, going into somebody’s home town. It was kind of nice, and everybody enjoyed the fight I think."

At UFC 210, Holbrook faced Gregor Gillespie on April 8, 2017. He lost the fight via knockout 21 seconds into the first round.

Holbrook faced Thibault Gouti on September 2, 2017 at UFC Fight Night 115. He lost the fight via TKO in the first round.

On June 21, 2019, it was reported that Holbrook was released from the UFC.

== Championships and accomplishments ==
=== Mixed martial arts ===
- Ultimate Fighting Championship
  - UFC.com Awards
    - 2016: Ranked #9 Upset of the Year vs. Jake Matthews
- Colosseum Combat Fighting
  - Lightweight Champion (One time) vs. Tyler Combs

== Mixed martial arts record ==
Professional record breakdown
15 matches	12 wins	3 losses
By knockout	1	3
By submission	9	0
By decision	2	0

Res.	Record	Opponent	Method	Event	Date	Round	Time	Location	Notes
Loss	12–3	Thibault Gouti	TKO (punches)	UFC Fight Night: Volkov vs. Struve	September 2, 2017	1	4:28	Rotterdam, Netherlands	
Loss	12–2	Gregor Gillespie	KO (punches)	UFC 210	April 8, 2017	1	0:21	Buffalo, New York, United States	
Win	12–1	Jake Matthews	Decision (split)	UFC Fight Night: Whittaker vs. Brunson	November 27, 2016	3	5:00	Melbourne, Australia	
Loss	11–1	Joaquim Silva	KO (punches)	The Ultimate Fighter: Team Joanna vs. Team Cláudia Finale	July 8, 2016	1	0:34	Las Vegas, Nevada, United States	
Win	11–0	Ramsey Nijem	Decision (split)	UFC on Fox: Dillashaw vs. Barao 2	July 25, 2015	3	5:00	Chicago Illinois, United States	
Win	10–0	Tyler Combs	TKO (punches)	Colosseum Combat 32	May 9, 2015	1	4:31	Kokomo, Indiana, United States	Won the Colosseum Lightweight Championship.
Win	9–0	Ramico Blackmon	Submission (guillotine choke)	Michiana Fight League 37	March 28, 2015	1	4:58	South Bend, Indiana, United States	
Win	8–0	Ian Rammel	Submission (brabo choke)	Midwest Fighting Series 12	January 30, 2015	1	1:33	Indianapolis, Indiana, United States	
Win	7–0	Jacob Clark	Submission (Guillotine Choke)	Midwest Fighting Series 10	August 15, 2014	1	1:18	Indianapolis, Indiana, United States	
Win	6–0	Gino DiGiulio	Submission (punches)	Midwest Fighting Series 9	April 4, 2014	2	2:23	Indianapolis, Indiana, United States	
Win	5–0	Daniel Head	Submission (guillotine choke)	Colosseum Combat 27	November 23, 2013	1	1:58	Kokomo, Indiana, United States	
Win	4–0	Andrew Huffman	Submission (armbar)	Midwest Fighting Series 6	October 11, 2013	1	3:14	Indianapolis, Indiana, United States	
Win	3–0	Ryan McIntosh	Submission (punches)	Midwest Fighting Series 5	July 19, 2013	1	2:05	Indianapolis, Indiana, United States	
Win	2–0	Brandon Priest	Submission (choke)	Midwest Fighting Series 4	May 10, 2013	1	4:12	Indianapolis, Indiana, United States	
Win	1–0	Joel Miller	Submission (rear-naked choke)	Absolute Cage Fighting 2	November 17, 2012	1	3:09	Indianapolis, Indiana, United States	

== See also ==
- List of current UFC fighters
- List of male mixed martial artists
