= UFC 210 =

UFC mixed martial arts event in 2017

UFC 210: Cormier vs Johnson 2
- The poster for UFC 210: Cormier vs Johnson 2
- Promotion: Ultimate Fighting Championship
- Date: April 8, 2017
- Venue: KeyBank Center
- City: Buffalo, New York
- Attendance: 17,110
- Total gate: $2,000,000
- Buyrate: 300,000

Event chronology
UFC Fight Night: Manuwa vs. Anderson	UFC 210: Cormier vs Johnson 2	UFC on Fox: Johnson vs. Reis

UFC 210: Cormier vs. Johnson 2 was a mixed martial arts event produced by the Ultimate Fighting Championship held on April 8, 2017, at the KeyBank Center in Buffalo, New York.

== Background ==
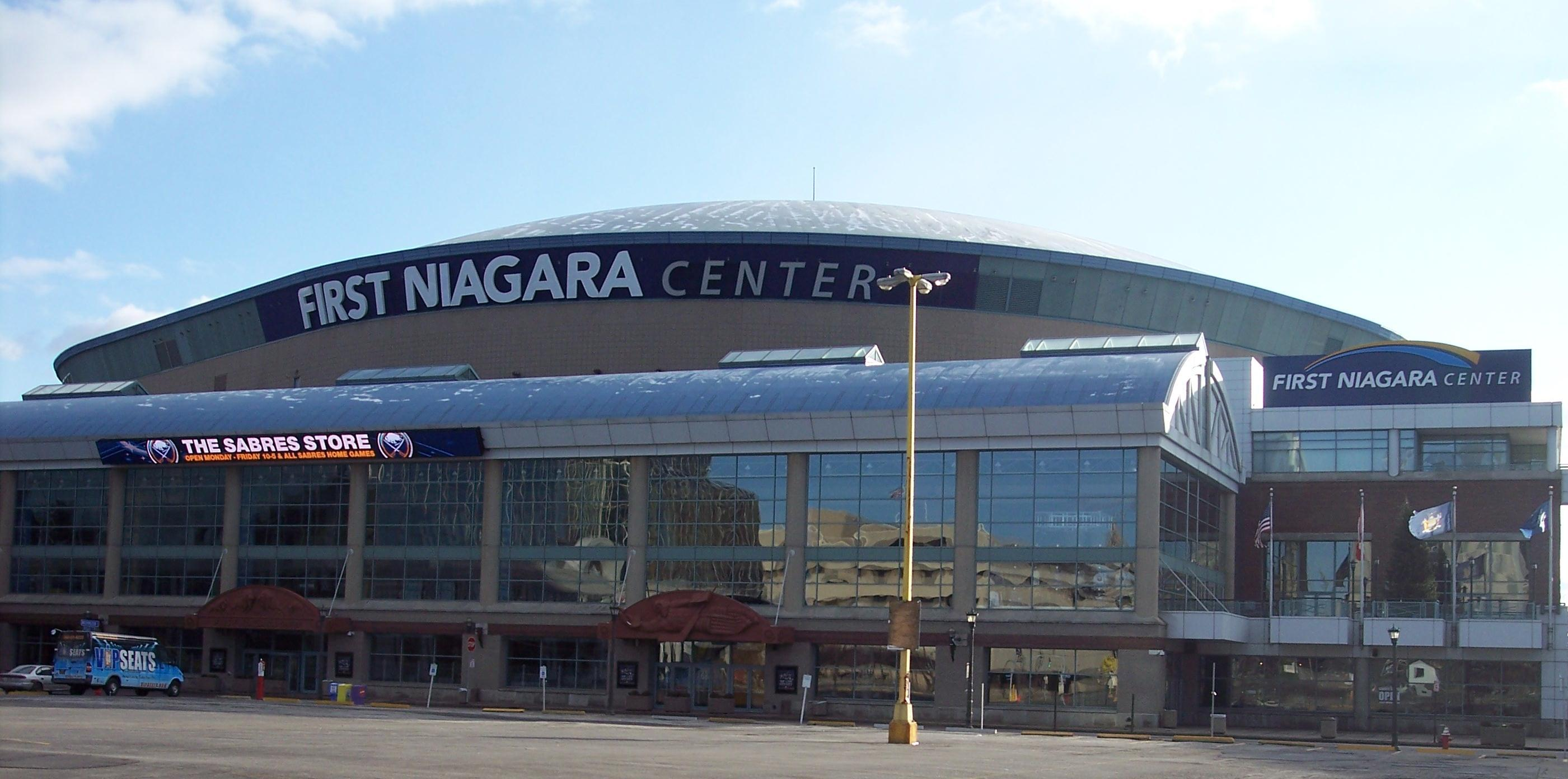
KeyBank Center marked the UFC's first return to Buffalo in almost 22 years.

The event was the second that the UFC has hosted in Buffalo, the first being UFC 7 in 1995. It was the first to be held in Buffalo since the state of New York lifted its ban on professional mixed martial arts in early 2016.

A UFC Light Heavyweight Championship rematch between current champion Daniel Cormier and Anthony Johnson headlined the event. The pairing met previously in May 2015 at UFC 187 with Cormier winning the fight (and the vacant title) via submission in the third round. This rematch was originally scheduled to take place at UFC 206, but Cormier pulled out due to an injury and the bout was scrapped.

Controversy arose at the weigh-in as Cormier, who had initially weighed in 1.2 pounds over the 205-pound limit, minutes later weighed in at exactly 205 pounds. Video appeared to show Cormier supporting himself on a towel held by a teammate, though New York State Athletic Commission (NYSAC) officials denied such allegations. After this fight, Johnson announced his retirement from the UFC and combat sports, effective immediately.

Promotional newcomer Pearl Gonzalez was expected to face Cynthia Calvillo at the event. She was ruled out of the contest on the day of the weigh ins after New York State Athletic Commission officials confirmed that she could not fight in the state because of her breast implants, which are banned among combat-sports competitors. Later the decision was reversed and the fight was allowed to go on as scheduled.

During the main card broadcast, it was announced that former WEC Featherweight Champion and UFC Bantamweight Championship title challenger Urijah Faber would be inducted into the Modern Era wing of the UFC Hall of Fame in this year's ceremony, which took place on July 6 in the midst of the UFC's annual International Fight Week festivities.

== Results ==
Main Card
Weight class				Method	Round	Time	Notes
Light Heavyweight	Daniel Cormier (c)	def.	Anthony Johnson	Submission (rear-naked choke)	2	3:37	(Note: For the UFC Light Heavyweight Championship.)
Middleweight	Gegard Mousasi	def.	Chris Weidman	TKO (knees)	2	3:13
Women's Strawweight	Cynthia Calvillo	def.	Pearl Gonzalez	Submission (rear-naked choke)	3	3:45
Welterweight	Thiago Alves	def.	Patrick Côté	Decision (unanimous) (30–27, 30–27, 30–27)	3	5:00
Lightweight	Charles Oliveira	def.	Will Brooks	Submission (rear-naked choke)	1	2:30
Preliminary Card (Fox Sports 1)
Featherweight	Myles Jury	def.	Mike De La Torre	TKO (elbows and punches)	1	3:30
Welterweight	Kamaru Usman	def.	Sean Strickland	Decision (unanimous) (30–27, 30–26, 30–26)	3	5:00
Featherweight	Shane Burgos	def.	Charles Rosa	TKO (punches)	3	1:59
Light Heavyweight	Patrick Cummins	def.	Jan Błachowicz	Decision (majority) (29–28, 29–28, 28–28)	3	5:00
Preliminary Card (UFC Fight Pass)
Lightweight	Gregor Gillespie	def.	Andrew Holbrook	KO (punches)	1	0:21
Lightweight	Desmond Green	def.	Josh Emmett	Decision (split) (28–29, 29–28, 30–27)	3	5:00
Women's Bantamweight	Katlyn Chookagian	def.	Irene Aldana	Decision (split) (28–29, 29–28, 29–28)	3	5:00
Flyweight	Magomed Bibulatov	def.	Jenel Lausa	Decision (unanimous) (29–26, 29–26, 29–26)	3	5:00	(Note: Bibulatov was deducted one point in round 2 due to a groin strike.)

== Bonus awards ==
The following fighters were awarded $50,000 bonuses:

- Fight of the Night: Shane Burgos vs. Charles Rosa
- Performance of the Night: Charles Oliveira and Gregor Gillespie

== Aftermath ==
The NYSAC issued a two-month suspension for Oliveira for hopping over the cage after defeating Brooks.

On April 13, Johnson's team officially filed an appeal with the NYSAC over the controversial weigh-in of Cormier. In their appeal, they took grievance with the fact that no representative from the NYSAC questioned Cormier over the baffling notion of him losing 1.2 pounds in a matter of minutes. Johnson's team then called for Cormier to address the issue under oath, and if his testimony does not provide a satisfactory explanation, for Cormier to be fined 20 percent of his fight purse and stripped of his UFC light heavyweight title for failing to make weight. Johnson has stated that he does not want Cormier to be stripped of his title but instead be fined 20%. On June 2, the NYSAC denied Johnson's appeal.

At the UFC 2022 Hall of Fame Induction Ceremony, Cormier admitted that he "may have grabbed the towel" during the weigh-in, which is believed by many analysts to be a confession.

== See also ==
- 2017 in UFC
- List of UFC events
- Mixed martial arts in New York
