= Super lightweight (MMA) =

MMA weight class

The super lightweight (or light welterweight) division in MMA sits between the lightweight division and the welterweight division. It was approved by the Association of Boxing Commissions on July 26, 2017. The upper limit was set at 165 lb (74.8 kg).

Some UFC fighters, including Ben Askren, Kevin Lee, Dustin Poirier, Bobby Green and Conor McGregor, have expressed interest in competing in a new UFC 165 lb division. However UFC president Dana White stated that there would never be a 165-pound division in the UFC.

Regional mixed martial arts promotion King of the Cage has implemented a 165-pound weight class and championship, though they refer to their 165-pound weight class as Light Welterweight and have moved their Welterweight division up from 170 pounds to 175 pounds.

Eagle Fighting Championship has introduced a 165-pound weight class at Eagle 46 where in the main event, Diego Sanchez and Kevin Lee had their Eagle FC debuts in this division. They refer to their 165-pound weight class as Super Lightweight and moved their Welterweight division from 170 pounds to 175 pounds.
