= Diego Sanchez =

American mixed martial artist (born 1981)

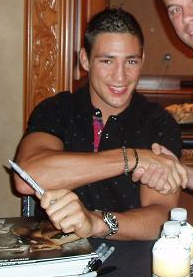
- Diego Sanchez in 2009
- Born: December 31, 1981 (age 44); Albuquerque, New Mexico, U.S.
- Nickname: The Nightmare
- Height: 5 ft 10 in (178 cm)
- Weight: 170 lb (77 kg; 12 st 2 lb)
- Division: Featherweight (2015); Lightweight (2009, 2013–2017); Super lightweight (2022); Welterweight (2002–2008, 2010–2012, 2017–present); Middleweight (2005)
- Reach: 72 in (183 cm)
- Stance: Southpaw
- Fighting out of: Albuquerque, New Mexico, U.S.
- Team: Jackson Wink MMA Academy (2002–2007, 2010–2019)
- Rank: Black belt in Gaidojutsu; Black belt in Brazilian Jiu-Jitsu under Roberto Tussa
- Years active: 2002–present

Mixed martial arts record
- Total: 44
- Wins: 30
- By knockout: 10
- By submission: 6
- By decision: 13
- By disqualification: 1
- Losses: 14
- By knockout: 4
- By decision: 10

Other information
- University
- Notable school: Del Norte High School
- Mixed martial arts record from Sherdog

Diego Sanchez (born December 31, 1981) is an American professional mixed martial artist. A professional competitor since 2002, Sanchez is most known for his time in the Ultimate Fighting Championship (UFC), where he won the Middleweight tournament of The Ultimate Fighter 1, and later challenged for the UFC Lightweight Championship in 2009. He has also formerly competed for King of the Cage, where he was the Welterweight Champion.

Sanchez has been involved in three Wrestling Observer Newsletter "Fight of the Year" bouts, tied for the most of any fighter in mixed martial arts; his first was against Karo Parisyan at UFC Fight Night 6, and then again against Clay Guida at The Ultimate Fighter 9 Finale (which culminated into a title shot against then-UFC Lightweight Champion B.J. Penn, where the two headlined UFC 107), and finally against Gilbert Melendez at UFC 166.

Sanchez is one of two fighters to have competed in four different weight classes in the UFC: Middleweight, Welterweight, Lightweight, and Featherweight; the other being Kenny Florian.

== Background ==
Sanchez was born to a Mexican American family on December 31, 1981. He was raised in Albuquerque, New Mexico, where he still resides. Albuquerque is also the location of his training camp.

Sanchez was a high school state champion in wrestling as a senior before he started training mixed martial arts while working for UPS. Sanchez eventually joined Jackson's Submission Fighting, still while working for UPS, managing the time between work and training.

== Mixed martial arts career ==
=== Early career ===
Sanchez made his MMA debut in 2002 in the promotion Ring of Fire, despite having injured his heel the night before. Sanchez mostly went for takedowns, while his opponent, who was a more developed striker, bloodied the young Sanchez. However, Sanchez continued to use his wrestling expertise, landed another takedown in the second round, taking his opponent's back, then sinking in a rear-naked choke, causing his opponent to tap. This made Sanchez the winner by submission, who then earned $600 for the bout. He then went on to compile an undefeated 11-0 record before becoming a contestant on The Ultimate Fighter.

=== The Ultimate Fighter ===
Sanchez was chosen as a participant in the first season of the reality show, The Ultimate Fighter. Presented as a young, focused middleweight who only had one goal, to become a UFC champion. He won a contract with the UFC after defeating fellow finalist Kenny Florian via TKO, becoming the middleweight winner for the first season of the show. On the show, Sanchez was known for being the "odd-ball" of the group, practicing yoga at odd moments and trying to extract "energy" from a lightning storm, and was also a self-proclaimed "Zen master".

=== Ultimate Fighting Championship ===
==== Welterweight ====
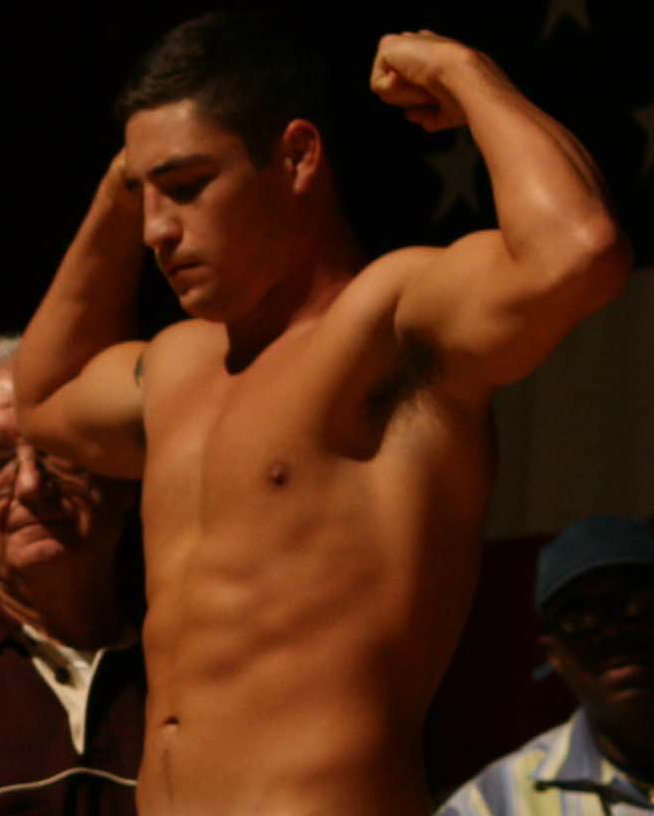
Sanchez during the weigh-ins before a fight

Sanchez made his post-TUF debut defeating journeyman Brian Gassaway by submission due to strikes at UFC 54 on August 20, 2005.

Sanchez next defeated Nick Diaz via unanimous decision at The Ultimate Fighter 2 Finale on November 5, 2005.

Sanchez won a unanimous decision over John Alessio on May 27, 2006, at UFC 60.

Sanchez continued his undefeated streak with a unanimous decision victory over judo specialist Karo Parisyan at UFC Fight Night 6 on August 17, 2006. This fight earned him the Fight of the Night award.

Sanchez faced Joe Riggs on December 13, 2006, in the main event of UFC Fight Night 7. Sanchez landed a right hook that knocked Riggs down, followed by a running knee that knocked Riggs out at 1:45 of the first round. Sanchez subsequently tested positive for the agents found in marijuana and was sentenced to a three-month suspension.

Sanchez was then cleared to fight Josh Koscheck at UFC 69. At the weigh-ins for the event, Sanchez shoved Koscheck while they stared each other down. Sanchez ended up losing a unanimous decision to Koscheck, ending his undefeated run, in a fight that was virtually all stand up. Koscheck managed to keep Sanchez at bay with superior hand speed and footwork until the bout timed out, to take the win 30–27 on all three judges' cards. Several weeks after the fight, Dana White announced that Sanchez was sick on the eve of the fight and almost had to retire when a test came back indicating he had Hepatitis C. Doctors eventually concluded the test results were not correct, but could not diagnose his sickness, so the fight went ahead as planned. The day after the fight Sanchez had a hole in his thigh the "size of a coffee cup" and was diagnosed with a staph infection.

In his next bout, Sanchez lost his second straight fight by split decision to Jon Fitch at UFC 76 on September 22, 2007, before rebounding against David Bielkheden at UFC 82 with a submission win in the first round due to strikes. Following the win, Sanchez stopped Luigi Fioravanti via TKO due to strikes at 4:07 of the third round at The Ultimate Fighter 7 Finale. After pulling out of a fight with Thiago Alves due to an injury, Sanchez announced he would be moving to the lightweight division.

==== Lightweight division and UFC Lightweight title shot ====
He made his lightweight debut in his next fight on February 21, 2009, at UFC 95 against Joe Stevenson. Training for the bout Sanchez worked with professional boxers Joey Gilbert and Lupe Aquino, Brazilian grappling experts Xande and Saulo Ribeiro and wrestling coach Bob Anderson. Although Stevenson pressed the action throughout the bout, Sanchez landed the better strikes and won by unanimous decision. Both fighters earned a Fight of the Night bonus award. Diego credits Tony Robbins for giving him mental preparation for this latest fight, and was seen entering the bout chanting "Yes!" repeatedly. This would go on to inspire the "Yes!" chant, popularized by professional wrestler, Daniel Bryan.

On June 20, 2009, Sanchez won a split-decision victory against Clay Guida at the finale of The Ultimate Fighter: United States vs. United Kingdom Finale. Sanchez won Fight of the Night honors, his second such award in a row. Opening up with a seemingly endless barrage of jabs and right uppercuts for the first minute he shook Guida, in the first round Sanchez also connected with a head kick that floored his opponent. Sanchez maintained a superior standup through the first round and the rest of the fight, though Guida rallied and made a contest of the next two rounds in a closely contested match. The fight went on to win "Fight of the Year" by several MMA magazines and the UFC.

At UFC 107 on December 12, 2009, Sanchez fought and lost to B.J. Penn for the UFC Lightweight Championship. Early in the first round, Penn landed a right hand that dropped Sanchez, followed by flurry of punches that almost prompted referee Herb Dean to stop the fight. Although Sanchez was able to recover enough to stay in the bout, he was outclassed in the following four rounds that saw Penn dominate with superior stand up, whilst all 27 takedown attempts made by Sanchez were negated by Penn's superior defense. Early in the fifth round, Penn landed a head kick that caused a large cut to be opened up on the forehead of Sanchez. Herb Dean called the action to a halt for doctor's advice and the fight ended at 2:37 by TKO, marking the first time Sanchez has been stopped in a fight. This also marked only the second fight in UFC history to end in the fifth round. At the post-fight press conference, UFC President Dana White was quoted saying Sanchez was "about as busted up as I've ever seen a guy." Sanchez had his bottom lip completely split open, with his left eye swollen shut and a large cut above his left eyebrow.

==== Return to Welterweight ====
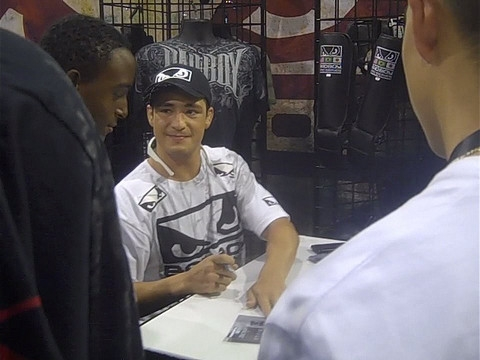
Sanchez at the UFC 100 Fan Expo event in Las Vegas in 2009

Sanchez returned to the welterweight division and faced John Hathaway on May 29, 2010, at UFC 114. In the first round of the fight, Hathaway caught Sanchez with a knee to the head as Sanchez attempted a takedown. Hathaway then dominated with ground and pound while all of Sanchez's takedown attempts were negated by Hathaway's strength. The rest of the fight saw Hathaway utilize his superior striking reach, giving him the unanimous decision (30–27, 30–27, 30–26), handing Sanchez his second consecutive loss.

Sanchez rejoined Jackson's Submission Fighting for his next fight with Paulo Thiago on October 23, 2010, at UFC 121. In this fight, Sanchez utilized his wrestling to control and punish Thiago in the second and third rounds. He also picked up Thiago and slammed him to the mat while screaming, Sanchez won the bout via unanimous decision. This win earned him the Fight of the Night award.

Sanchez defeated Martin Kampmann by a unanimous decision on March 3, 2011, at UFC Live: Sanchez vs. Kampmann in a bout that earned Fight of the Night honors. In the bout, Kampmann dropped Sanchez in the first round, and continued to get the better in the exchanges but Sanchez continuously pressured Kampmann into the cage to force wild exchanges in the second and third rounds. By the end of the fight, both men were bloodied up especially Sanchez, whose face was a bloody mess. Sanchez won the fight via unanimous decision. The bout earned both fighters the Fight of the Night award.

Sanchez was expected to face former two-time UFC Welterweight Champion and UFC Hall of Famer Matt Hughes on September 24, 2011, at UFC 135. However, Sanchez had to withdraw from the bout due to a broken hand and was replaced by Josh Koscheck.

A bout between Sanchez and Jake Ellenberger was briefly linked to UFC 141. However, a lingering hand injury kept Sanchez out of action until February 2012.

The Ellenberger/Sanchez bout took place on February 15, 2012, at UFC on Fuel TV 1 Ellenberger defeated Sanchez via unanimous decision in a bout that earned both fighters Fight of the Night honors.

==== Return to Lightweight ====
Sanchez then returned to lightweight and faced Takanori Gomi on March 2, 2013, at UFC on Fuel TV 8. Sanchez failed to make the 156 lb weight limit at the weigh ins, weighing at 158 lbs. He was fined 20 percent of his earnings and the bout was contested at a catchweight of 158 lb. Sanchez defeated Gomi via controversial split decision. 12 of 12 media outlets scored the bout in favor of Gomi.

Sanchez faced Gilbert Melendez on October 19, 2013, at UFC 166. He lost the fight via unanimous decision. The bout earned Sanchez his seventh Fight of the Night bonus award.

Sanchez faced Myles Jury on March 15, 2014, at UFC 171. He lost the fight via unanimous decision.

Sanchez faced Ross Pearson on June 7, 2014, at UFC Fight Night 42. Sanchez was outstruck in every round, even getting knocked down in the second, but was awarded the win via controversial split decision. 14 of 14 media outlets scored the bout in favor of Pearson, 13 with scores of 30-27. UFC president Dana White indicated that the organization will informally treat the bout as a win for Pearson and that he would be compensated with a $30,000 win bonus.

Sanchez was expected to face Norman Parke at UFC 180. However, Parke pulled out of the bout in early October citing a knee injury and was replaced by Joe Lauzon. However, on October 23, it was announced that injuries to both Sanchez and Lauzon led to the pairing being scrapped altogether.

In January 2015, Sanchez had surgery to repair his collarbone that was broken in training.

==== Stint in featherweight division ====
After a lengthy hiatus, Sanchez returned to make his debut in the Featherweight division. He faced Ricardo Lamas on November 21, 2015, at The Ultimate Fighter Latin America 2 Finale. He lost the fight by unanimous decision.

==== Second return to lightweight ====
After the one fight stint at featherweight, Sanchez returned to the lightweight division and faced Jim Miller on March 5, 2016, at UFC 196. He won the fight by unanimous decision.

Sanchez faced longtime peer Joe Lauzon on July 9, 2016, at UFC 200. He lost the fight via TKO in the first round, resulting in his first TKO loss. The only previous TKO loss Sanchez had is when B.J. Penn stopped him with a head kick at UFC 107.

Sanchez fought promotional newcomer Marcin Held on November 5, 2016, at The Ultimate Fighter Latin America 3 Finale. Sanchez won the fight via unanimous decision.

Sanchez next faced Al Iaquinta on April 22, 2017 at UFC Fight Night 108. He lost the fight via knockout in the first round.

==== Second return to Welterweight ====
Sanchez faced Matt Brown in a welterweight bout on November 11, 2017 at UFC Fight Night: Poirier vs. Pettis. He lost the fight via knockout in round one.

At the "JacksonWink MMA Fight Night 2" exhibition event on December 1, 2017, Sanchez faced Isaac "The Shermanator" Marquez, a man who was born with Down syndrome who dreamed of one day competing in a real mixed martial arts bout. Sanchez helped train Marquez who dedicated the fight to his late mother who died from dementia. "Most Down syndrome adults don't live past 45." Sanchez said ahead of the bout. "Isaac is 32, and I just wanted to see this young man be healthy. Exercise and martial arts are one of the most healthy things you can do." In a friendly spirited match, Marquez defeated Sanchez with a first-round submission armbar win and received a huge ovation when Sanchez tapped out.

Sanchez faced Craig White on September 8, 2018 at UFC 228. He won the fight by unanimous decision.

Six months later, Sanchez faced Mickey Gall on March 2, 2019 at UFC 235. Sanchez won the fight via second round TKO. This marked Sanchez's first stoppage victory since 2008, while also earning him his first Performance of the Night bonus award.

As the final fight of his prevailing contract with the UFC, Sanchez faced Michael Chiesa on July 6, 2019 at UFC 239. He lost the fight via unanimous decision.

On May 28, 2019, it was announced that the fight between Sanchez and Clay Guida at The Ultimate Fighter 9 Finale, where Sanchez defeat Guida by split decision, on June 20, 2009, will be honored to enter the UFC Hall of Fame during the international fight July 2019.

Sanchez was suspended for three months by USADA after testing positive for Ostarine and S-23, the family of selective androgen receptor modulators (SARMs), where the prohibited substance was found from a tainted supplement. The suspension retroactive from October 26, 2019, and he was eligible to fight again on January 26, 2020.

As the first bout of his new five-fight contract, Sanchez returned to the octagon when he faced Michel Pereira at UFC Fight Night 167 on February 15, 2020 in Rio Rancho, New Mexico. After being dominated through the bout, he eventually won the fight via disqualification after Pereira landed an illegal knee on the ground in the third round, which rendered Sanchez unable to continue.

Sanchez faced Jake Matthews on September 27, 2020 at UFC 253. He lost the fight via unanimous decision.

Sanchez was scheduled to face Donald Cerrone on May 8, 2021 at UFC on ESPN 24. However, Sanchez was removed from the fight on April 28 for undisclosed reasons and he was replaced by Alex Morono. Despite not fighting, Sanchez claims the organization paid him his guaranteed purse, win money and sponsorship money.

Sanchez posted a few videos on his Instagram account showing disagreements that his trainer, Joshua Fabia had with the commentary team, where Fabia believed that the organization was attempting to slight Sanchez with its coverage. Among his claims were that the UFC was aiming cameras at him to catch him and Sanchez in bad situations, or otherwise expose Fabia's unorthodox coaching style. Fabia's infamous training sessions have been widely covered since Sanchez started working with him, including Fabia chasing his fighters around with a knife. After the release of these videos, Sanchez was released from the UFC.

On May 20, 2021, Sanchez announced that he had parted ways with Fabia.

=== Eagle Fighting Championship ===
As the first bout of his three-fight contract, Sanchez made his debut against Kevin Lee in a 165 lbs bout on March 11, 2022 at Eagle FC 46. Sanchez hurt Lee's lead leg early in the fight with leg kicks, but would be overwhelmed by Lee's wrestling for a majority of the fight, losing by unanimous decision.

== Other combat sports ==
=== Submission grappling ===
Sanchez was scheduled to participate in a four-man grappling tournament organized by Grapplers Quest at the UFC Fan Expo in Toronto, between April 29 and 30 of 2011. In the first round, he defeated Andrew McInnes by submission via kneebar. Sanchez lost to Ryan Hall by points in the final round.

Sanchez was scheduled to face Jake Ellenberger at Submission Underground 8. Ellenberger won via fastest escape time.

Sanchez was booked to compete against fellow MMA veteran Jake Shields in a grappling match at High Rollerz 4. Sanchez lost the superfight.

=== Bare Knuckle Fighting Championship ===
Sanchez signed with Bare Knuckle Fighting Championship in November 2022. After being medically cleared to compete by the New Mexico Athletic Commission, he faced former WBA super welterweight champion Austin Trout at BKFC: KnuckleMania 3 on February 17, 2023. Sanchez lost the bout via TKO in the 4th round due to doctor stoppage.

=== Boxing ===
Sanchez was scheduled to face John Makdessi in his boxing debut on April 12, 2025 at ICS Mania 1. However the entire card was canceled due to contractual obligations.

== Personal life ==
Sanchez was previously married to Bernadette, with whom he has a daughter. He has been married to Theresa, the widow of Johnny Tapia, since 2024.

On July 18, 2025, Sanchez was arrested on gun charges in Albuquerque, New Mexico after allegedly firing a round from a moving vehicle as his friend drove past a traffic collision. Police officers who responded to the accident scene heard the shot and pursued the vehicle, conducted a traffic stop, and placed Sanchez under arrest. He was booked into the Bernalillo County jail on charges of shooting at or from a motor vehicle, a fourth-degree felony, and negligent use of a deadly weapon, a misdemeanor.

== Championships and accomplishments ==
=== Mixed martial arts ===
- Ultimate Fighting Championship
  - UFC Hall of Fame (Fight wing, Class of 2019) vs. Clay Guida at The Ultimate Fighter: United States vs. United Kingdom Finale
  - The Ultimate Fighter 1 Middleweight Tournament Winner
  - Fight of the Night (Seven times) vs. Karo Parisyan, Joe Stevenson, Clay Guida, Paulo Thiago, Martin Kampmann, Jake Ellenberger, Gilbert Melendez
    - Tied (Jim Miller, Joe Lauzon & Max Holloway) for seventh most Fight of the Night bonuses in UFC history (7)
  - Performance of the Night (One time) vs. Mickey Gall
  - Tied for third most wins by decision in UFC history (12)
  - First The Ultimate Fighter Tournament Winner in UFC History
  - Tied (Jim Miller) for third most decision bouts in UFC history (21)
  - UFC.com Awards
    - 2005: Ranked #5 Fight of the Year vs. Nick Diaz
    - 2006: Fight of the Year vs. Karo Parisyan & Ranked #9 Knockout of the Year vs. Joe Riggs
    - 2009: Fight of the Year vs. Clay Guida
    - 2010: Ranked #9 Fight of the Year vs. Paulo Thiago
    - 2011: Ranked #7 Fight of the Year vs. Martin Kampmann
    - 2013: Ranked #4 Fight of the Year vs. Gilbert Melendez
- King of the Cage
  - KOTC Welterweight Championship (One time)

- Wrestling Observer Newsletter
  - 2006 Fight of the Year vs. Karo Parisyan on August 17
  - 2009 Fight of the Year vs. Clay Guida on June 20
  - 2013 Fight of the Year vs. Gilbert Melendez on October 19
- World MMA Awards
  - 2009 Fight of the Year vs. Clay Guida at The Ultimate Fighter: United States vs. United Kingdom Finale
- Bloody Elbow
  - 2009 Fight of the Year vs. Clay Guida at The Ultimate Fighter: United States vs. United Kingdom Finale
- Inside MMA
  - 2009 Bazzie Award for Fight of the Year vs. Clay Guida on June 20
  - 2013 Bazzie Award for Fight of the Year vs. Gilbert Melendez on October 19
- Bleacher Report
  - 2013 Fight of the Year vs. Gilbert Melendez on October 19
- MixedMartialArts.com
  - 2009 Fight of the Year vs. Clay Guida
- New Mexico Boxing
  - 2005 Fighter of the Year
  - 2006 Fighter of the Year
  - 2010 Fighter of the Year

=== Submission grappling ===
- Grapplers Quest
  - Grapplers Quest Hall of Fame
  - Seven-Time Grapplers Quest Champion

=== Amateur wrestling ===
- New Mexico Activities Association
  - NMAA High School Wrestling State Champion

== Mixed martial arts record ==
Professional record breakdown
44 matches	30 wins	14 losses
By knockout	10	4
By submission	6	0
By decision	13	10
By disqualification	1	0

Res.	Record	Opponent	Method	Event	Date	Round	Time	Location	Notes
Loss	30–14	Kevin Lee	Decision (unanimous)	Eagle FC 46	March 11, 2022	3	5:00	Miami, Florida, United States	Super Lightweight (165 lb) debut.
Loss	30–13	Jake Matthews	Decision (unanimous)	UFC 253	September 27, 2020	3	5:00	Abu Dhabi, United Arab Emirates	
Win	30–12	Michel Pereira	DQ (illegal knee)	UFC Fight Night: Anderson vs. Błachowicz 2	February 15, 2020	3	3:09	Rio Rancho, New Mexico, United States	
Loss	29–12	Michael Chiesa	Decision (unanimous)	UFC 239	July 6, 2019	3	5:00	Las Vegas, Nevada, United States	
Win	29–11	Mickey Gall	TKO (punches)	UFC 235	March 2, 2019	2	4:13	Las Vegas, Nevada, United States	Performance of the Night.
Win	28–11	Craig White	Decision (unanimous)	UFC 228	September 8, 2018	3	5:00	Dallas, Texas, United States	
Loss	27–11	Matt Brown	KO (elbow)	UFC Fight Night: Poirier vs. Pettis	November 11, 2017	1	3:44	Norfolk, Virginia, United States	Return to Welterweight.
Loss	27–10	Al Iaquinta	KO (punches)	UFC Fight Night: Swanson vs. Lobov	April 22, 2017	1	1:38	Nashville, Tennessee, United States	
Win	27–9	Marcin Held	Decision (unanimous)	The Ultimate Fighter Latin America 3 Finale: dos Anjos vs. Ferguson	November 5, 2016	3	5:00	Mexico City, Mexico	
Loss	26–9	Joe Lauzon	TKO (punches)	UFC 200	July 9, 2016	1	1:26	Las Vegas, Nevada, United States	
Win	26–8	Jim Miller	Decision (unanimous)	UFC 196	March 5, 2016	3	5:00	Las Vegas, Nevada, United States	Return to Lightweight.
Loss	25–8	Ricardo Lamas	Decision (unanimous)	The Ultimate Fighter Latin America 2 Finale: Magny vs. Gastelum	November 21, 2015	3	5:00	Monterrey, Mexico	Featherweight debut.
Win	25–7	Ross Pearson	Decision (split)	UFC Fight Night: Henderson vs. Khabilov	June 7, 2014	3	5:00	Albuquerque, New Mexico, United States	
Loss	24–7	Myles Jury	Decision (unanimous)	UFC 171	March 14, 2014	3	5:00	Dallas, Texas, United States	
Loss	24–6	Gilbert Melendez	Decision (unanimous)	UFC 166	October 19, 2013	3	5:00	Houston, Texas, United States	Fight of the Night.
Win	24–5	Takanori Gomi	Decision (split)	UFC on Fuel TV: Silva vs. Stann	March 3, 2013	3	5:00	Saitama, Japan	Return to Lightweight; Sanchez missed weight (158 lb).
Loss	23–5	Jake Ellenberger	Decision (unanimous)	UFC on Fuel TV: Sanchez vs. Ellenberger	February 15, 2012	3	5:00	Omaha, Nebraska, United States	Fight of the Night.
Win	23–4	Martin Kampmann	Decision (unanimous)	UFC Live: Sanchez vs. Kampmann	March 3, 2011	3	5:00	Louisville, Kentucky, United States	Fight of the Night.
Win	22–4	Paulo Thiago	Decision (unanimous)	UFC 121	October 23, 2010	3	5:00	Anaheim, California, United States	Fight of the Night.
Loss	21–4	John Hathaway	Decision (unanimous)	UFC 114	May 29, 2010	3	5:00	Las Vegas, Nevada, United States	Return to Welterweight.
Loss	21–3	B.J. Penn	TKO (doctor stoppage)	UFC 107	December 12, 2009	5	2:37	Memphis, Tennessee, United States	For the UFC Lightweight Championship.
Win	21–2	Clay Guida	Decision (split)	The Ultimate Fighter: United States vs. United Kingdom Finale	June 20, 2009	3	5:00	Las Vegas, Nevada, United States	Fight of the Night. Fight of the Year.
Win	20–2	Joe Stevenson	Decision (unanimous)	UFC 95	February 21, 2009	3	5:00	London, England	Lightweight debut. Fight of the Night.
Win	19–2	Luigi Fioravanti	TKO (knee and punches)	The Ultimate Fighter: Team Rampage vs. Team Forrest Finale	June 21, 2008	3	4:07	Las Vegas, Nevada, United States	
Win	18–2	David Bielkheden	TKO (submission to punches)	UFC 82	March 1, 2008	1	4:43	Columbus, Ohio, United States	
Loss	17–2	Jon Fitch	Decision (split)	UFC 76	September 22, 2007	3	5:00	Anaheim, California, United States	
Loss	17–1	Josh Koscheck	Decision (unanimous)	UFC 69	April 7, 2007	3	5:00	Houston, Texas, United States	
Win	17–0	Joe Riggs	KO (knee)	UFC Fight Night: Sanchez vs. Riggs	December 13, 2006	1	1:45	San Diego, California, United States	Sanchez tested positive for marijuana.
Win	16–0	Karo Parisyan	Decision (unanimous)	UFC Fight Night: Sanchez vs. Parisyan	August 17, 2006	3	5:00	Las Vegas, Nevada, United States	Fight of the Night. Fight of the Year.
Win	15–0	John Alessio	Decision (unanimous)	UFC 60	May 27, 2006	3	5:00	Los Angeles, California, United States	
Win	14–0	Nick Diaz	Decision (unanimous)	The Ultimate Fighter 2 Finale	November 5, 2005	3	5:00	Las Vegas, Nevada, United States	
Win	13–0	Brian Gassaway	TKO (submission to punches)	UFC 54	August 20, 2005	2	1:56	Las Vegas, Nevada, United States	Return to Welterweight.
Win	12–0	Kenny Florian	TKO (punches)	The Ultimate Fighter 1 Finale	April 9, 2005	1	2:49	Las Vegas, Nevada, United States	Won The Ultimate Fighter 1 Middleweight Tournament.
Win	11–0	Jorge Santiago	Decision (unanimous)	KOTC 37: Unfinished Business	June 12, 2004	3	5:00	San Jacinto, California, United States	Won the vacant KOTC Welterweight Championship.
Win	10–0	Ray Elbe	TKO (submission to punches)	KOTC 36: Albuquerque	May 15, 2004	1	1:07	Albuquerque, New Mexico, United States	
Win	9–0	Travis Beachler	TKO (punches)	Pride of Albuquerque	April 10, 2004	1	0:35	Albuquerque, New Mexico, United States	
Win	8–0	Cruz Chacon	Submission (rear-naked choke)	KOTC 35: Acoma	February 28, 2004	1	0:41	Acoma, New Mexico, United States	
Win	7–0	John Cronk	Submission (kimura)	KOTC 26: Gladiator Challenge	August 3, 2003	2	1:30	Las Cruces, New Mexico, United States	
Win	6–0	Rene Kronvold	Submission (armbar)	KOTC 24: Mayhem	June 14, 2003	1	3:39	Albuquerque, New Mexico, United States	
Win	5–0	Mike Guymon	Submission (armbar)	KOTC 23: Sin City	May 16, 2003	1	4:57	Las Vegas, Nevada, United States	
Win	4–0	Jake Short	TKO (punches)	KOTC 21: Invasion	February 21, 2003	1	2:34	Albuquerque, New Mexico, United States	Welterweight debut.
Win	3–0	Shannon Ritch	Submission (rear-naked choke)	KOTC 20: Crossroads	December 15, 2002	1	0:59	Bernalillo, New Mexico, United States	Middleweight bout.
Win	2–0	Jesus Sanchez	KO (punches)	Aztec Challenge 1	September 6, 2002	2	2:33	Ciudad Juárez, Mexico	
Win	1–0	Michael Johnson	Submission (rear-naked choke)	Ring of Fire 5	June 21, 2002	1	3:45	Denver, Colorado, United States	

== Mixed martial arts exhibition record ==
Exhibition record breakdown		
3 matches	3 wins	0 losses
By submission	2	0
By decision	1	0

Res.	Record	Opponent	Method	Event	Date	Round	Time	Location	Notes
Win	3–0	Josh Koscheck	Split Decision	The Ultimate Fighter 1	March 28, 2005 (airdate)	3	5:00	Las Vegas, Nevada	The Ultimate Fighter 1 Semi-final round.
Win	2–0	Josh Rafferty	Submission (rear-naked choke)	The Ultimate Fighter 1	March 7, 2005 (airdate)	1	1:48	Las Vegas, Nevada	The Ultimate Fighter 1 Quarterfinal round.
Win	1–0	Alex Karalexis	Submission (rear-naked choke)	The Ultimate Fighter 1	February 7, 2005 (airdate)	1	1:47	Las Vegas, Nevada	

== Bare-knuckle boxing record ==
Professional record breakdown
1 match	0 wins	1 loss
By knockout	0	1

Res.	Record	Opponent	Method	Event	Date	Round	Time	Location	Notes
Loss	0–1	Austin Trout	TKO (doctor stoppage)	BKFC KnuckleMania 3	February 17, 2023	4	1:44	Albuquerque, New Mexico, United States	

== See also ==
- List of male mixed martial artists
