= James Moontasri =

American mixed martial arts fighter

- Born: April 10, 1988 (age 38); Frankfurt, Germany
- Other names: Moonwalker
- Nationality: American
- Height: 5 ft 10 in (1.78 m)
- Weight: 170 lb (77 kg; 12 st)
- Division: Lightweight; Welterweight
- Reach: 71 in (180 cm)
- Style: Tae Kwon Do-Muay Thai-Brazilian Jiu Jitsu
- Fighting out of: Los Angeles, California, United States
- Team: Blackhouse
- Rank: 5th dan black belt in Taekwondo; Black belt in Muay Thai; Brown belt in Brazilian Jiu-Jitsu
- Years active: 2008; 2011-2018

Mixed martial arts record
- Total: 14
- Wins: 9
- By knockout: 4
- By submission: 3
- By decision: 2
- Losses: 5
- By submission: 1
- By decision: 4

Other information
- Mixed martial arts record from Sherdog

James Moontasri (Thai: เจมส์ มูลทาศรี; born April 10, 1988) is an American retired mixed martial artist who competed in the Light and Welterweight divisions. Moontasri competed in RFA and the UFC. James was also a silver medalist at the 2007 Pan American Games in Tae Kwon Do, 2007 USA Tae Kwon Do Male Athlete of the Year, and 2x USA Tae Kwon Do National Champion.

== Early life ==
Moontasri was born in Frankfurt, Germany to a Korean-American mother and a Thai-American military father.

== Mixed martial arts career ==
=== Resurrection Fighting Alliance ===
With a 4–1 mixed martial arts record, Moontasri made his RFA debut on August 16, 2013, facing R.J. Clifford at RFA 9: Munhoz vs. Curran. He won the bout via third round TKO. In his next fight, he faced Rick Reger at RFA 12: Ortega vs. Koch on January 24, 2014, submitting Reger via a rear-naked choke in the second round.

For his third appearance with the promotion, Moontasri faced Jordan Rinaldi at RFA 15: Casey vs. Sanchez on June 6, 2014. He won the bout via second round KO, and just a couple weeks later, it was announced that Moontasri had signed with the UFC.

=== Ultimate Fighting Championship ===
After his win over Rinaldi, Moontasri was picked up by the UFC and faced fellow promotional newcomer Joe Ellenberger at UFC Fight Night: Swanson vs. Stephens on June 28, 2014. Despite hurting Ellenberger in the first round, he would rally in the second and third rounds and Moontasri lost via split decision. 8 of 11 media outlets scored the bout for Moontasri, while 3 scored a draw.

He was then scheduled to face Jake Lindsey at UFC Fight Night: Henderson vs. Thatch on February 14, 2015. However, Lindsey pulled out of the bout because of an injury and was replaced by promotional newcomer Cody Pfister. Moontasri was dominate in the fight, finishing Pfister with a rear-naked choke in the second round.

Moontasri faced Kevin Lee on July 15, 2015 at UFC Fight Night 71. He lost the fight via submission in the first round.

Moontasri was expected to face Brendan O'Reilly in a welterweight bout on November 15, 2015 at UFC 193, filling in for an injured William Macário. Subsequently, O'Reilly pulled out of the fight in the week leading up to the event citing injury and was replaced by promotional newcomer Anton Zafir. He won the fight via TKO in the first round.

Moontasri next faced Alex Oliveira on July 23, 2016 at UFC on Fox 20. He lost the one-sided fight via unanimous decision.

Moontasri was expected to face Alex Morono on October 15, 2016 at UFC Fight Night 97. However, the promotion announced on October 6 that they had cancelled the event entirely. In turn, the pairing was quickly rescheduled and eventually took place on December 17, 2016 at UFC on Fox 22. Moontasri lost the fight by unanimous decision.

== Mixed martial arts record ==
Professional record breakdown
14 matches	9 wins	5 losses
By knockout	4	0
By submission	3	1
By decision	2	4

Res.	Record	Opponent	Method	Event	Date	Round	Time	Location	Notes
Loss	9–5	Alex Morono	Decision (unanimous)	UFC on Fox: VanZant vs. Waterson	December 17, 2016	3	5:00	Sacramento, California, United States	
Loss	9–4	Alex Oliveira	Decision (unanimous)	UFC on Fox: Holm vs. Shevchenko	July 23, 2016	3	5:00	Chicago, Illinois, United States	
Win	9–3	Anton Zafir	TKO (spinning back kick and spinning back fist)	UFC 193	November 15, 2015	1	4:36	Melbourne, Australia	Welterweight debut.
Loss	8–3	Kevin Lee	Submission (rear-naked choke)	UFC Fight Night: Mir vs. Duffee	July 15, 2015	1	2:56	San Diego, California, United States	
Win	8–2	Cody Pfister	Submission (rear-naked choke)	UFC Fight Night: Henderson vs. Thatch	February 14, 2015	2	1:49	Broomfield, Colorado, United States	Catchweight (158 lbs) bout; Moontasri missed weight.
Loss	7–2	Joe Ellenberger	Decision (split)	UFC Fight Night: Swanson vs. Stephens	June 28, 2014	3	5:00	San Antonio, Texas, United States	
Win	7–1	Jordan Rinaldi	KO (punch)	RFA 15: Casey vs. Sanchez	June 6, 2014	2	1:14	Culver City, California, United States	Catchweight (160 lbs) bout; Moontasri missed weight.
Win	6–1	Rick Reger	Technical Submission (rear-naked choke)	RFA 12: Ortega vs. Koch	January 24, 2014	2	0:28	Los Angeles, California, United States	
Win	5–1	R.J. Clifford	TKO (punches)	RFA 9: Munhoz vs. Curran	August 16, 2013	3	2:40	Los Angeles, California, United States	
Loss	4–1	Darren Smith	Decision (split)	FCOC: Fight Club OC	June 6, 2013	3	5:00	Costa Mesa, California, United States	
Win	4–0	Joshua Aveles	Decision (unanimous)	RITC: Respect in the Cage	August 25, 2012	3	5:00	Pomona, California, United States	
Win	3–0	Joshua Aveles	Decision (unanimous)	RITC: Respect in the Cage	November 19, 2011	3	5:00	Pomona, California, United States	
Win	2–0	Tim Lindsay	KO (punch)	Gladiator Challenge: Hostile	April 22, 2011	1	0:56	San Jacinto, California, United States	
Win	1–0	Jade Delong	Submission (verbal)	GC 83: Savage	August 29, 2008	2	0:37	San Bernardino, California, United States	

== See also ==
- List of current UFC fighters
- List of male mixed martial artists
