= Jason Gonzalez (fighter) =

American mixed martial arts (MMA) fighter

- Born: Jason Gonzalez; 28 February 1990 (age 36); Torrance, California
- Other names: Nicoyas
- Nationality: American
- Height: 6 ft 2 in (1.88 m)
- Weight: 155 lb (70 kg; 11.1 st)
- Division: Lightweight
- Reach: 74 in (188 cm)
- Fighting out of: Rancho Cucamonga, California
- Team: Millennia MMA Gym
- Years active: 2011-present

Mixed martial arts record
- Total: 16
- Wins: 11
- By knockout: 4
- By submission: 7
- Losses: 5
- By knockout: 2
- By submission: 3

Other information
- Mixed martial arts record from Sherdog

Jason Gonzalez (born February 28, 1990, in Torrance, California) is an American professional mixed martial artist who formerly competed in the lightweight division of the Ultimate Fighting Championship.

== Mixed martial arts career ==
=== Early career ===
Gonzalez began his professional MMA career in 2011. Fighting mainly in his native California, Gonzalez amassed a record of 10 wins against 2 losses over the first five years of his career.

=== The Ultimate Fighter ===
In 2015 Gonzalez was selected as one of the fighters on The Ultimate Fighter: Team McGregor vs. Team Faber as a member of Team Faber. In the opening round he faced Tim Welch and won via TKO in the second round. In the first elimination round he faced Abner Lloveras and lost the bout by unanimous decision.

=== Ultimate Fighting Championship ===
Gonzalez made his official UFC debut at UFC 203 on September 10, 2016. He faced Drew Dober and lost the bout via knockout in the first round.

In his second fight for the promotion, Gonzalez faced J.C. Cottrell at UFC on Fox: Shevchenko vs. Peña on January 28, 2017. He won via a D'arce choke submission in the first round to earn his first UFC win.

In his third fight for the promotion, Gonzalez faced Gregor Gillespie on September 16, 2017, at UFC Fight Night 116. He lost the back-and-forth fight via submission in the second round. Despite the loss, Gonzalez was awarded his first Fight of the Night bonus award.

Gonzalez faced Jim Miller on April 27, 2019, at UFC Fight Night: Jacaré vs. Hermansson. He lost the fight via a rear-naked choke submission in the first round.

Gonzalez was released by UFC in December 2019.

== Championships and accomplishments ==
- Ultimate Fighting Championship
  - Fight of the Night (One time) vs. Gregor Gillespie

== Mixed martial arts record ==
Professional record breakdown
16 matches	11 wins	5 losses
By knockout	4	2
By submission	7	3

Res.	Record	Opponent	Method	Event	Date	Round	Time	Location	Notes
Loss	11–5	Jim Miller	Submission (rear-naked choke)	UFC Fight Night: Jacaré vs. Hermansson	April 27, 2019	1	2:12	Sunrise, Florida, United States	
Loss	11–4	Gregor Gillespie	Submission (arm-triangle choke)	UFC Fight Night: Rockhold vs. Branch	September 16, 2017	2	2:11	Pittsburgh, Pennsylvania, United States	Fight of the Night.
Win	11–3	J.C. Cottrell	Submission (D'arce choke)	UFC on Fox: Shevchenko vs. Peña	January 28, 2017	1	3:54	Denver, Colorado, United States	
Loss	10–3	Drew Dober	KO (punches)	UFC 203	September 10, 2016	1	1:45	Cleveland, Ohio, United States	
Win	10–2	Chris Padilla	TKO (punches)	RFA 38: Moisés vs. Emmers	June 3, 2016	3	5:00	Costa Mesa, California, United States	
Win	9–2	Jessie Glass	Submission (rear-naked choke)	Gladiator Challenge: California State Championship Series	February 28, 2015	1	1:36	San Jacinto, California, United States	
Win	8–2	Chad McEwen	KO (punch)	Gladiator Challenge: Holiday Beatings	December 20, 2015	1	0:50	El Cajon, California, United States	
Win	7–2	Jake Albinio	Submission (triangle choke)	Gladiator Challenge: Season's Beatings	November 22, 2015	1	2:21	Rancho Mirage, California, United States	
Win	6–2	Chad McEwen	Submission (armbar)	Gladiator Challenge: Glove Up	October 4, 2014	1	2:38	San Jacinto, California, United States	
Win	5–2	Shane Johnson	Submission (triangle choke)	WFC 10: Fury of Heat	August 17, 2013	1	2:17	Laughlin, Nevada, United States	Catchweight bout (159 lbs); Gonzalez missed weight.
Loss	4–2	Dionisio Ramirez	KO	Xplode Fight Series: Summer Fight Night 3	June 21, 2013	1	1:42	Twentynine Palms, California, United States	
Win	4–1	Christos Giagos	Submission (D'arce choke)	Respect in the Cage	May 19, 2012	2	4:14	Pomona, California, United States	
Loss	3–1	Shane Lees	Submission (armbar)	CWC: Operation Fight Night	April 14, 2012	1	3:33	Fort Hood, Texas, United States	
Win	3–0	Dominic Clark	KO (punch)	Respect in the Cage	January 21, 2012	2	0:28	Pomona, California, United States	
Win	2–0	Kerry Lattimer	Submission (rear-naked choke)	Xtreme Warfare: Inauguration	September 3, 2011	1	3:47	Layton, Utah, United States	
Win	1–0	Chris Camacho	TKO (doctor stoppage)	KOTC: Next Generation	June 30, 2011	3	0:33	Highland, California, United States	
