= Cody Pfister =

American mixed martial arts fighter

- Born: July 12, 1990 (age 36); Amarillo, Texas, United States
- Other names: The Fist
- Height: 5 ft 11 in (1.80 m)
- Weight: 155 lb (70 kg; 11.1 st)
- Division: Lightweight
- Reach: 73 in (185 cm)
- Fighting out of: Amarillo, Texas, United States
- Team: Pfister MMA
- Rank: Orange-stripe red belt in Kung Fu; Purple belt in Jiu-jitsu under Filemon Teixeira
- Years active: 2009–present

Mixed martial arts record
- Total: 29
- Wins: 17
- By knockout: 4
- By submission: 7
- By decision: 6
- Losses: 11
- By knockout: 2
- By submission: 5
- By decision: 4
- Draws: 1

Other information
- Mixed martial arts record from Sherdog

Cody Pfister (born August 7, 1990) is an American mixed martial artist who competes in the Lightweight division. A professional competitor since 2009, he has competed for the UFC, Bellator, Shark Fights, King of the Cage, and the Resurrection Fighting Alliance.

== Mixed martial arts career ==
=== Ultimate Fighting Championship ===
After an unsuccessful bid to get on The Ultimate Fighter: Live and an 11–3–1 run on the regional circuit, Pfister signed with the UFC in 2015.

Pfister faced James Moontasri at UFC Fight Night: Henderson vs. Thatch on February 14, 2015, replacing Jake Lindsey. Pfister lost the fight by submission in the second round.

Pfister then faced Yosdenis Cedeno at UFC 189 on July 11, 2015. He won the fight by unanimous decision.

Pfister faced Sage Northcutt on December 10, 2015, at UFC Fight Night 80. Despite winning the first round, Pfister lost by submission via guillotine choke in the second.

Pfister next faced Scott Holtzman on July 13, 2016, at UFC Fight Night 91. He lost the fight via unanimous decision and was subsequently released from the promotion.

=== Bellator MMA ===
Pfister made his promotional debut for Bellator against Jonathan Gary at Bellator 174 on March 3, 2017. He won the fight via submission in the first round, and in his post-fight interview, announced his retirement from MMA. However he has promised to return in his own promotion, Fist Fight Night.

=== Regional circuit ===
Despite announcing his retirement, Pfister faced Charles Bennett at Fist Fight Night 2 on September 30, 2017. He won the fight via first-round submission.

He then faced Wu Haotian at Kunlun Fight MMA 16 on October 28, 2017. He won the fight via unanimous decision.

Next he faced Kyle Prepolec at BTC 5 on March 9, 2019. He lost the fight via unanimous decision.

He then faced Adam Assenza at BTC 9 on February 29, 2020. He lost the fight via split decision.

Pfister was next scheduled to face Tom Shoaff at Rage in the Cage 78 on January 30, 2021. However, Shoaff withdrew from the bout and was replaced with Sterling Lenz. Pfister won the fight via first-minute submission.

Pfister was then scheduled to face Trey Ogden at FAC 7 on March 5, 2021. However, Pfister withdrew from the bout and was replaced with Darius Estell.

Pfister faced Don Shainis for the FAC Lightweight Championship on May 6, 2022, at FAC 13. He lost the bout via TKO stoppage in the first round.

== Mixed martial arts record ==
Professional record breakdown
30 matches	17 wins	12 losses
By knockout	4	2
By submission	7	5
By decision	6	5
Draws	1	
No contests	0	

Res.	Record	Opponent	Method	Event	Date	Round	Time	Location	Notes
Loss	17–12–1	Cam Teague	TKO (punches)	Island Fights 95	March 28, 2026	1	3:56	Mobile, Alabama, United States	For the vacant Island Fights Featherweight Championship.
Win	17–11–1	Tyson Southern	Submission (rear-naked choke)	Storm FC 1	November 8, 2025	1	1:47	Altus, Oklahoma, United States	Catchweight (160 lb) bout.
Loss	16–11–1	Michael Stack	Decision (split)	Peak Fighting 44	May 10, 2025	3	5:00	Amarillo, Texas, United States	For the Peak Fighting Featherweight Championship.
Loss	16–10–1	Chance Beck	Submission (armbar)	Peak Fighting 34	March 16, 2024	1	2:32	Amarillo, Texas, United States	Return to Featherweight. For the Peak Fighting Featherweight Championship.
Loss	16–9–1	Don Shainis	TKO (punches)	FAC 13	May 6, 2022	1	2:55	Independence, Missouri, United States	For the FAC Lightweight Championship.
Win	16–8–1	Sterling Lenz	Submission (rear-naked choke)	Rage in the Cage: OKC 78	January 30, 2021	1	0:50	Lawton, Oklahoma, United States	
Loss	15–8–1	Adam Assenza	Decision (split)	BTC 9	February 29, 2020	3	5:00	Kitchener, Ontario, Canada	
Loss	15–7–1	Kyle Prepolec	Decision (unanimous)	BTC 5	March 9, 2019	3	5:00	Windsor, Ontario, Canada	
Win	15–6–1	Wu Haotian	Decision (unanimous)	Kunlun Fight MMA 16 / Australian FC 21	October 28, 2017	3	5:00	Melbourne, Australia	
Win	14–6–1	Charles Bennett	Submission (rear-naked choke)	Fist Fight League: Fight Night 2	September 30, 2017	1	2:36	Amarillo, Texas, United States	Won the vacant FFL Lightweight Championship.
Win	13–6–1	Jonathan Gary	Submission (rear-naked choke)	Bellator 174	March 3, 2017	1	4:04	Thackerville, Oklahoma, United States	
Loss	12–6–1	Scott Holtzman	Decision (unanimous)	UFC Fight Night: McDonald vs. Lineker	July 13, 2016	3	5:00	Sioux Falls, South Dakota, United States	
Loss	12–5–1	Sage Northcutt	Submission (guillotine choke)	UFC Fight Night: Namajunas vs. VanZant	December 10, 2015	2	0:41	Las Vegas, Nevada, United States	
Win	12–4–1	Yosdenis Cedeno	Decision (unanimous)	UFC 189	July 11, 2015	3	5:00	Las Vegas, Nevada, United States	
Loss	11–4–1	James Moontasri	Submission (rear-naked choke)	UFC Fight Night: Henderson vs. Thatch	February 14, 2015	2	1:49	Broomfield, Colorado, United States	Catchweight (158 lb) bout; Moontasri missed weight.
Win	11–3–1	Brett Glass	Submission (rear-naked choke)	Top Alliance Combat 3	September 6, 2014	1	2:50	McDonough, Georgia, United States	Return to Lightweight. Won the inaugural TAC Lightweight Championship.
Win	10–3–1	Ed Cline Jr.	TKO (punches)	Xtreme Fighting League: Fight Night 15	November 8, 2013	1	1:18	Tulsa, Oklahoma, United States	Defended the XFL Welterweight Championship.
Win	9–3–1	Mitchell Hale	Decision (unanimous)	Xtreme Fighting League: Vengeance	June 28, 2013	5	5:00	Grant, Oklahoma, United States	Defended the XFL Welterweight Championship.
Win	8–3–1	Codale Ford	Decision (unanimous)	Xtreme Fighting League: Fight Night 12	April 12, 2013	5	3:00	Tulsa, Oklahoma, United States	Won the vacant XFL Welterweight Championship.
Draw	7–3–1	Ed Cline Jr.	Draw (majority)	Xtreme Fighting League: Fight Night 11	February 1, 2013	5	3:00	Tulsa, Oklahoma, United States	Welterweight debut. For the vacant XFL Welterweight Championship.
Win	7–3	Isaias Martinez	TKO (punches)	Shark Fights 21	November 11, 2011	1	4:09	Lubbock, Texas, United States	Lightweight debut.
Win	6–3	Brian Castillo	Submission (rear-naked choke)	Martinez Brothers Production: Sun City Battle 2	October 1, 2011	1	2:13	El Paso, Texas, United States	
Win	5–3	James Gabriel	Submission (rear-naked choke)	Revolution Cage Warrior Challenge: Throwdown Showdown 11	September 17, 2011	1	0:47	Liberal, Kansas, United States	
Loss	4–3	Tim Means	Submission (rear-naked choke)	KOTC: Kingpin	August 27, 2011	1	2:15	Lubbock, Texas, United States	For the KOTC Light Welterweight Championship.
Loss	4–2	Derek Campos	Submission (rear-naked choke)	Undisputed MMA 1	June 18, 2011	1	2:55	Amarillo, Texas, United States	
Loss	4–1	Anselmo Luna	Decision (unanimous)	24/7 Entertainment 1	April 8, 2011	3	3:00	Midland, Texas, United States	
Win	4–0	Mitchell Hale	Decision (split)	Shark Fights 12	June 26, 2010	3	5:00	Amarillo, Texas United States	
Win	3–0	Gino Davila	Decision (unanimous)	Shark Fights 10	April 24, 2010	3	3:00	Lubbock, Texas, United States	
Win	2–0	Severo Padilla	TKO (punches)	Shark Fights 9	March 20, 2010	1	2:52	Amarillo, Texas, United States	
Win	1–0	Jeremy Hinojosa	KO (punches)	Shark Fights 8	February 5, 2010	1	0:49	Lubbock, Texas, United States	Featherweight debut.

=== Amateur mixed martial arts record ===
Res.	Record	Opponent	Method	Event	Date	Round	Time	Location	Notes
Win	1–0	Brenton Taylor	Decision (unanimous)	XFL: Collision Course	March 6, 2009	3	2:00	Tulsa, Oklahoma, United States	

== See also ==
- List of current UFC fighters
- List of male mixed martial artists
