= Keith Lee (food critic) =

American mixed martial artist (born 1996)

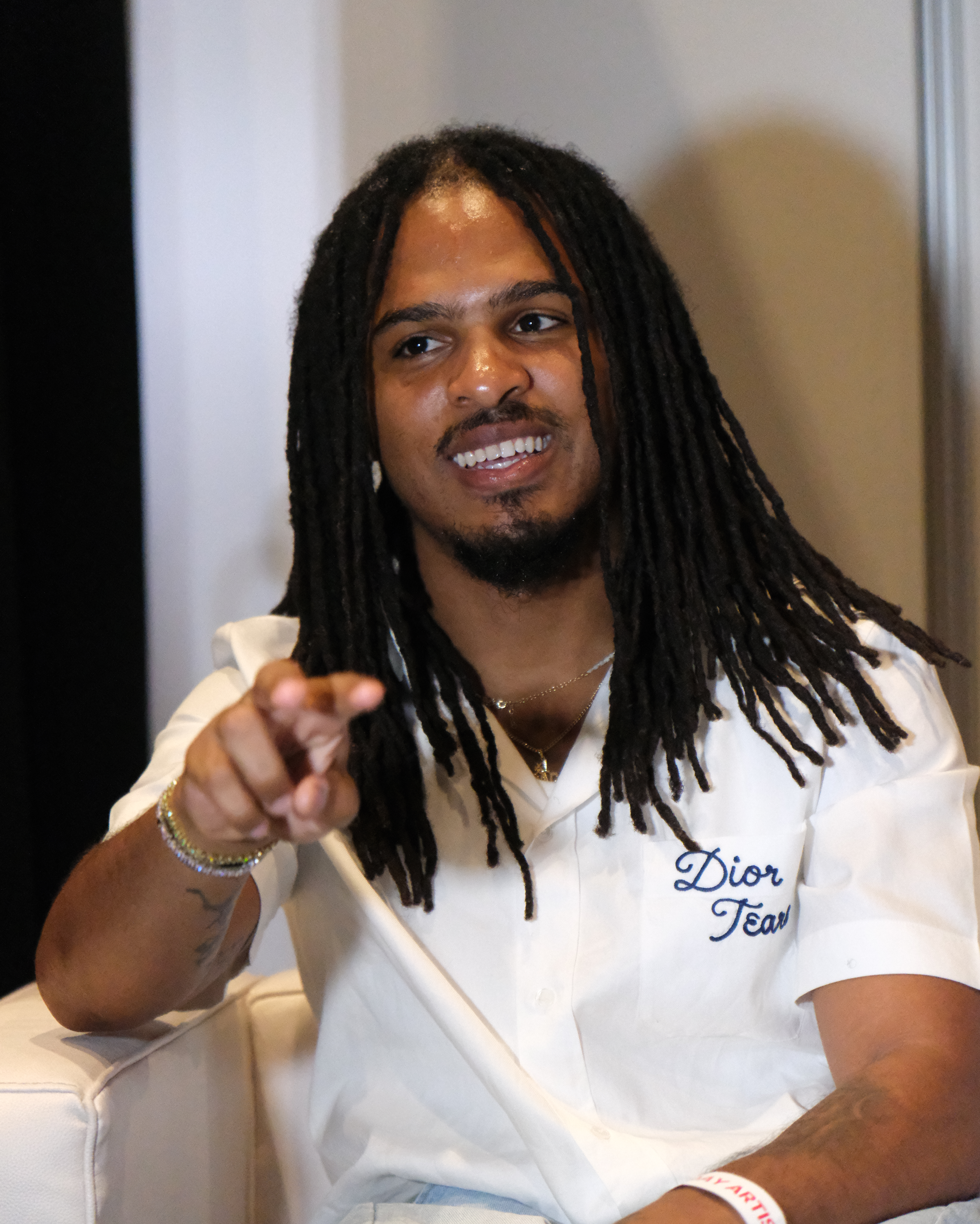
- Keith Lee at Essence Festival of Culture 2025
- Born: October 4, 1996 (age 30); Detroit, Michigan, U.S.
- Spouse: Ronni Lee
- Children: 3
- Relatives: Kevin Lee (brother)
- Martial arts career
- Height: 5 ft 11 in (180 cm)
- Weight: 145 lb (66 kg; 10 st 5 lb)
- Division: Bantamweight; Featherweight
- Reach: 70 1/2 in (179 cm)
- Fighting out of: Las Vegas, Nevada, U.S.
- Team: Xtreme Couture
- Years active: 2017–present (MMA)

Mixed martial arts record
- Total: 13
- Wins: 8
- By knockout: 3
- By submission: 1
- By decision: 4
- Losses: 5
- By submission: 1
- By decision: 4

Other information
- Mixed martial arts record from Sherdog

TikTok information
- Page: Keith Lee
- Followers: 17 million
- Last updated: May 10, 2025

Keith Lee (born October 4, 1996) is an American social media personality, food critic, and mixed martial artist.

Aside from his martial arts career, Lee is the founder of the Familee Day festival (stylized as "FamiLee"), which is planned to be held annually but debuting in 2026. The first year will feature Kirk Franklin, Mannie Fresh, Tobe Nwigwe, Andra Day, and many others.

== Mixed martial arts career ==
Lee’s mixed martial arts career turned professional in 2017. He fought under the nickname "Killa". Lee made his Bellator debut in 2018 and at his promotional debut he picked up a decision over Shawn Bunch at Bellator 239. He lost his contract with Bellator in 2021, after which he began pursuing his social media food reviews more heavily, though as of January 2023 he still planned to continue his MMA career in a more limited capacity.

== Social media career ==
Keith Lee gained prominence as a Las Vegas based food taster on TikTok. Lee began using TikTok in November 2020, mainly posting cooking videos and family content. He began posting restaurant reviews in 2021. Lee's videos follow a consistent formula, where he describes his experience ordering the food and rates each item on a scale from one to ten.

As of April 2024, he had 16.1 million followers and his food reviews had gained over 721.9 million likes. Lee says he began making TikToks to help combat his anxiety with public speaking.

Lee has traveled to cities such as Atlanta, Houston and New York to review local restaurants, giving preference to Black-owned and family-owned restaurants. He frequently has family members place takeout orders on his behalf in order to avoid preferential treatment from restaurant owners.

In 2024, Lee selected Toronto as the first international stop of his food tour. He praised the cultural food diversity and customer service in the Canadian city.

Lee was included on the 2024 Forbes 30 Under 30 list under the category Food & Drink because of his TikTok food reviews.

In 2026, Lee hosted the first annual Familee Day Festival in New Orleans, a food and music festival presented in partnership with Live Nation Urban and Morrow Hospitality, featuring performances from Kirk Franklin, Andra Day, Tobi Nwigwe, and Gracie's Corner. Over 20,000 people attended this event at the UNO Lakefront Festival Grounds.

== Personal life ==
Lee has three siblings, including his brother, fellow mixed martial artist Kevin Lee. Lee and his wife Ronni, who has been featured on Lee's TikTok account, have two daughters. In March 2025, Lee revealed that he and his wife were expecting their third child. In August 2025, they announced that they would be having a son.

== Mixed martial arts record ==
Professional record breakdown
13 matches	8 wins	5 losses
By knockout	3	0
By submission	1	1
By decision	4	4

Res.	Record	Opponent	Method	Event	Date	Round	Time	Location	Notes
Win	8–5	Jeremiah Labiano	Decision (split)	Urijah Faber's A1 Combat 5	September 3, 2022	3	5:00	Sacramento, California, United States	
Loss	7–5	Jornel Lugo	Technical Submission (rear-naked choke)	Bellator 265	August 20, 2021	1	5:00	Sioux Falls, South Dakota, United States	
Loss	7–4	Raufeon Stots	Decision (unanimous)	Bellator 253	November 19, 2020	3	5:00	Uncasville, Connecticut, United States	
Win	7–3	Vinicius Zani	Decision (unanimous)	Bellator 245	September 11, 2020	3	5:00	Uncasville, Connecticut, United States	
Win	6–3	Shawn Bunch	Decision (unanimous)	Bellator 239	February 21, 2020	3	5:00	Thackerville, Oklahoma, United States	
Win	5–3	Leonardo Alves Carvalho	Submission (rear-naked choke)	Global Legion FC 13	December 13, 2019	2	2:37	Miramar, Florida, United States	
Win	4–3	Chris Johnson	Decision (unanimous)	Final Fight Championship 38	June 20, 2019	3	5:00	Las Vegas, Nevada, United States	
Loss	3–3	Jeremy Pacatiw	Decision (split)	Brave CF 14	August 18, 2018	3	5:00	Tangier, Morocco	
Loss	3–2	John Sweeney	Decision (split)	864 Fighting Championship: Fight 3	March 24, 2018	3	5:00	Greenville, South Carolina, United States	
Win	3–1	Shawn Mack	TKO (punches)	KnockOut Promotions 59	December 16, 2017	1	4:09	Grand Rapids, Michigan, United States	
Win	2–1	Eric Daigneault	TKO (real etirement)	TKO 40 - Denouement	September 8, 2017	1	5:00	Saint-Roch-de-l'Achigan, Quebec, Canada	
Win	1–1	Alex Slicer	TKO (elbows and punches)	TKO 39 - Ultimatum	June 16, 2017	2	1:24	Saint-Roch-de-l'Achigan, Quebec, Canada	
Loss	0–1	Tony Laramie	Decision (unanimous)	TKO 37 - Rivals	January 13, 2017	3	5:00	Montreal, Canada	

== Filmography ==
Television
Year	Title	Role	Notes
2026	Keith Lee: All In The Familee	Himself/host	Tubi original series

== Awards and nominations ==
Year	Organization	Award	Nominated work	Result	Ref.
2025	TikTok Awards	Creator of the Year	Himself	Won	
2026	NAACP Image Awards	Outstanding Digital Content Creator – Fitness/Wellness/Food	Himself	Won	
